= Liverpool Wavertree by-election =

Liverpool Wavertree by-election may refer to one of two parliamentary by-elections held for the British House of Commons constituency of Liverpool Wavertree:

- 1931 Liverpool Wavertree by-election
- 1935 Liverpool Wavertree by-election

== See also ==
- Liverpool Wavertree (UK Parliament constituency)
