= Squatting in Scotland =

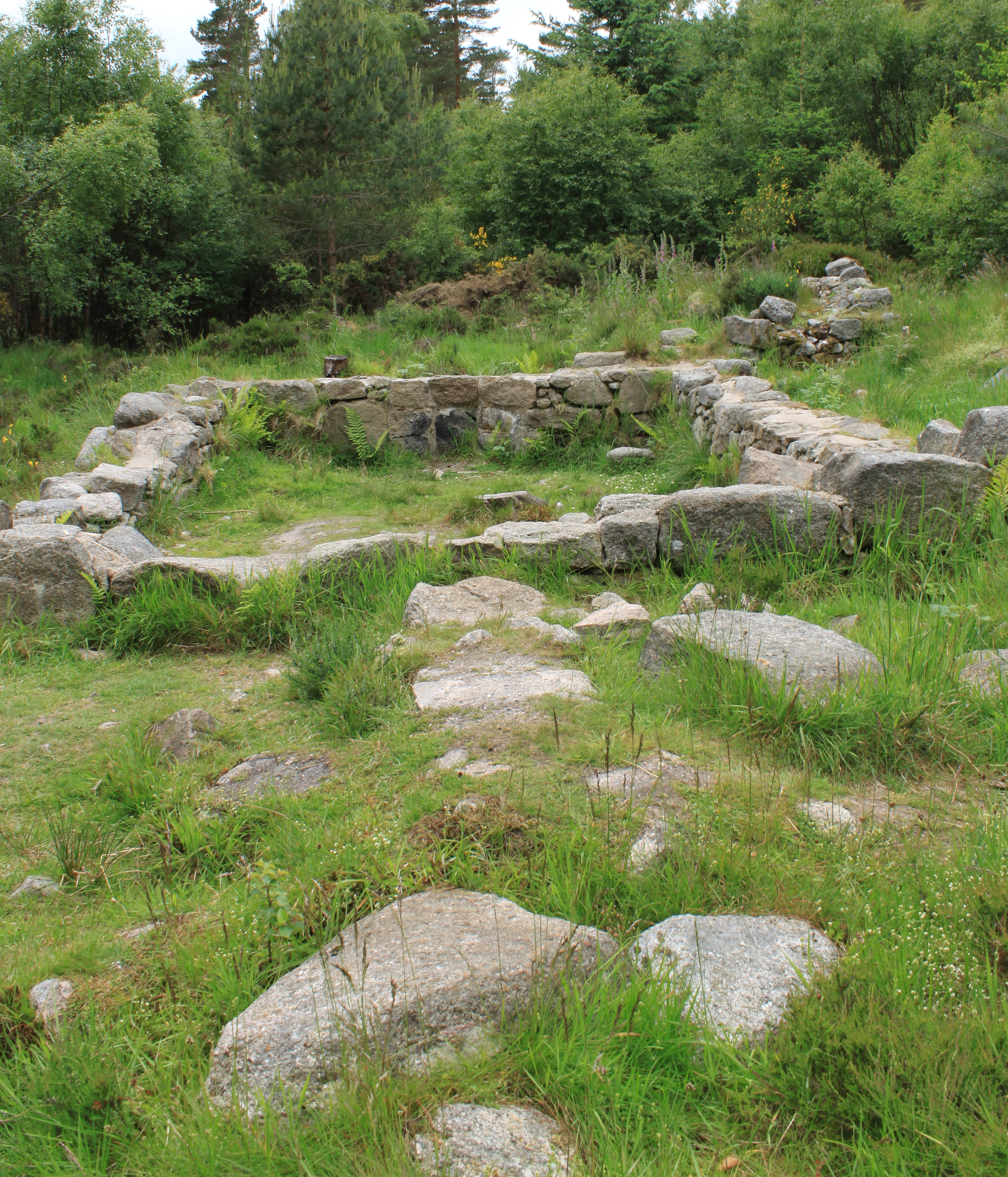
Ruins of The Colony in the Bennachie hills

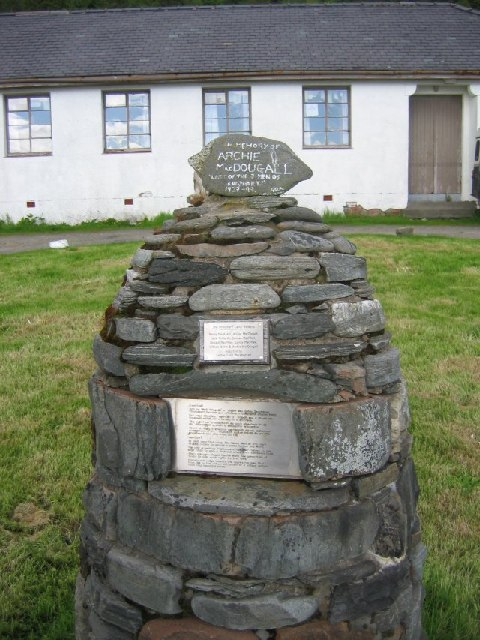
A memorial to the Seven Men of Knoydart at Inverie on the Knoydart peninsula.

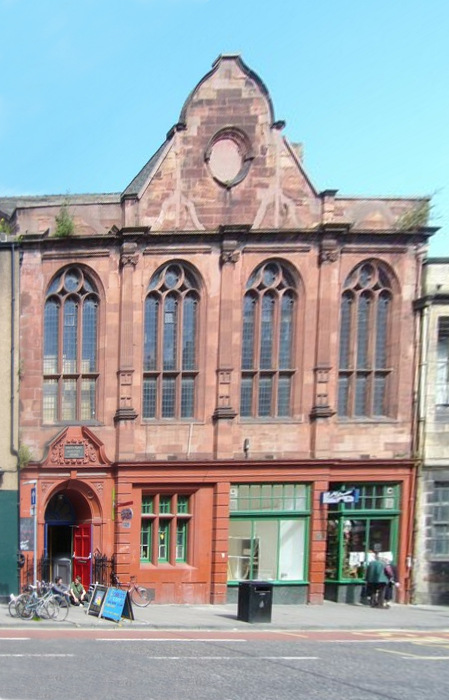
The Forest Café pictured in 2009 at its Bristo Place site. After it was evicted, the building was squatted in 2011.

Squatting in Scotland is criminalised by the Trespass Act 1865. Following the Highland Clearances, land raids occurred across rural Scotland in the late nineteenth and early twentieth centuries, for example in Vatersay and Knoydart. More recently there have been land occupations as both road protests and as part of the Occupy movement. Baile Hoose was occupied during the 2021 United Nations Climate Change Conference in Glasgow.

== History ==
A 1960 article in the Agricultural History Review noted instances of Iron Age squatting. Squatting was criminalised in 1865 by the Trespass Act. The number of cases which come to court are small: between 2007 and 2011, the average number of prosecutions was 13; between 2005 and 2010, there were 26 convictions. Adverse possession does not exist in Scots law, but a similar concept is positive prescription, which only applies to land. In order for positive prescription to be successful the applicant must firstly hold a deed in either the Register of Sasines or a title in the Land Registry, and secondly must have had possession of the land for a time of ten years, meeting various conditions. According to author and politician Andy Wightman, Scotland has seen four waves of squatting in which powerful interests stole land from the Scottish people. He names these as feudalism, the reformation, the division of the commonties and the foundation of the royal burghs.

Following the Highland Clearances, land raids occurred across rural Scotland in the late nineteenth and early twentieth centuries. Irish land reform proponent Michael Davitt was enthusiastically received when he did speaking tours in 1882 and 1887. The Vatersay Raiders lived in bad conditions on the islands of Barra and Mingulay so they decided to occupy land on Vatersay. The absentee landlord Emily Gordon Cathcart took them to court and they received two-month prison sentences in 1908. After an uproar they were released and Cathcart paid their travel home. Eventually the state purchased the island and it was divided up into crofts by the Congested Districts Board. The Seven Men of Knoydart carried out a land raid as late as 1948 as part of a publicity campaign for land reform on the Knoydart peninsula. The Colony was a squatted commontie in the Bennachie hills for 100 years starting in the 1830s. In 1946, a squatters movement rose up similar to the one in England and Wales in places such as Edinburgh, Glasgow, Peterhead and Wigtown. Derelict army camps were squatted as well the ex German consulate in Glasgow. The 1865 Trespass Act was used to prosecute squatters.

== Recent events ==
Two squat actions were carried out as road protests. The Pollok Free State unsuccessfully fought plans to extend the M77 motorway through Pollok Country Park, whilst a camp at Bilston contested the construction of a bypass. In 2011, the former site of the Forest Café was briefly occupied by 100 people protesting against the lack of community spaces in Edinburgh.

As part of the 2011 Occupy movement, land was squatted by Occupy Glasgow and Occupy Edinburgh. During the 2021 United Nations Climate Change Conference in Glasgow, commonly known as COP26, the derelict Hamish Allan Centre at Centre Street in Tradeston was occupied. The former shelter was renamed Baile Hoose and offered alternative accommodation for attendees of the conference, supported by the COP26 Coalition. Patrick Harvie, Minister for Zero Carbon Buildings, Active Travel and Tenants' Rights, endorsed the occupation whilst Glasgow City Council said the building was unsafe. The council went to court as the owner of the building and a sheriff principal granted a possession order. After four weeks, the activists left the building peacefully.

== See also ==
- Homelessness in Scotland
