= Holly Lodge Girls' College =

Community school in Liverpool, England

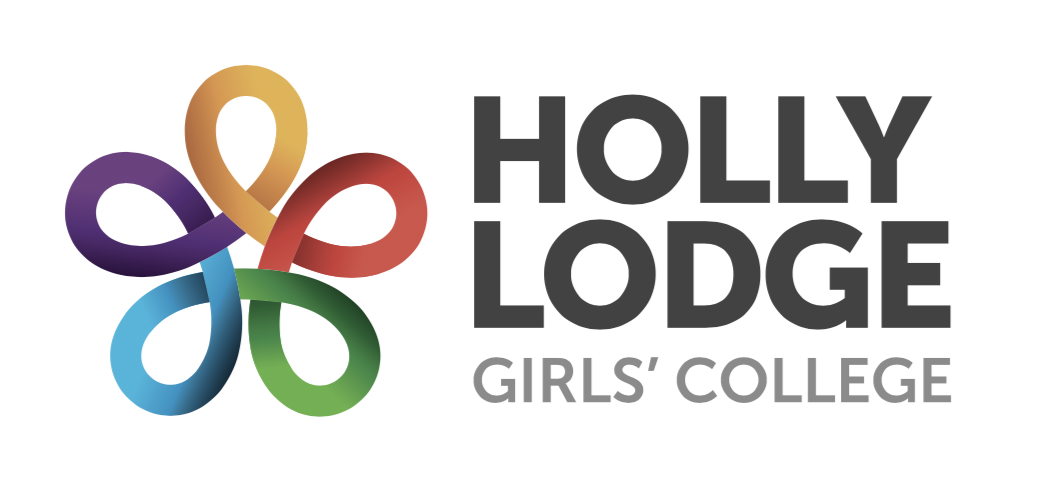

Location
- 140 Mill Lane, West Derby; Liverpool, Merseyside, L12 7LE; England; 53.428780°N 2.9161039°W

Information
- Other name: Holly Lodge
- Former name: Holly Lodge Girls' School
- Type: Community school
- Established: 1922
- Local authority: Liverpool City Council
- Department for Education URN: 104688 Tables
- Ofsted: Reports
- Head teacher: Andy Keen
- Gender: Girls
- Age range: 11–18
- Enrolment: 956 (2024)
- Capacity: 1,529
- Website: www.hollylodge.liverpool.sch.uk

Holly Lodge Girls' College (simply referred to as Holly Lodge and formerly Holly Lodge High School for Girls) is an 11–18 girls, community secondary school and sixth form in West Derby, Liverpool, Merseyside, England. It was established in 1922.

== History ==
Holly Lodge Girls' College was established in 1922 where it was built as Holly Lodge Girls' School on Queens Drive. The school was evacuated to Denbigh during the Second World War, and was a centre for children to sit the eleven-plus in the 1940s and 1950s. In the 1970s, the school became Holly Lodge Comprehensive School, with the addition of the site at Bankfield, following the closure of Bankfield Secondary Modern School.

In 1977, there was a row over school catchment areas, with parents protesting that their daughters had not been offered places at the school. A local resident said that the problem with children not being offered places at Holly Lodge happened every year. In 1980, the head said that the A-level pass rate was 66% and the sixth form was open access.

In 1984, the city council, then controlled by Militant, proposed closing the school or merging it with West Derby Boys' School. This was part of a "controversial schools reorganisation programme". Keith Joseph, Secretary of State for Education, intervened and said the school must stay open. Joseph is described as having "saved" the school. The capacity of the school was reduced, however. The following year parents said that the council was trying to make it appear that the school was under capacity.

In 1994, the school made an animated video promoting non-smoking, which was used nationally. In 1997, the school was part of a pilot scheme of after-school clubs to help children with homework. In the 1990s, the school was said to have "an art department with a national reputation for excellence". The school ran adult education classes, also open to pupils aged 16+, with a nude model.

In 2002, the director of art at the school received the BT and Tate Modern art-in-education award. This was for work with the Foundation for Art and Creative Technology. The school donated its archives to Liverpool Record Office and its photographs to Liverpool Central Library for public viewing in 2014.

It was originally in the Stoneycroft area of the city, but a new building was constructed in West Derby in 2015 to replace the older Victorian and 1930s buildings.

== Curriculum ==
Holly Lodge Girls' College offers GCSEs, BTECs and NVQs as programmes of study for pupils, while students in the sixth form have the option to study from a range of A-levels and further BTECs.

== Inspections ==
As of 2023, the school's most recent inspection by Ofsted was in 2019, with a judgement of Good.

== Headteachers ==
The first principal was Agnes Drummond, who was still in post in 1945.

In 1976, the headteacher was Winifred Chisholm.

In 1996, Susan Jowett was appointed as headteacher.

== Notable alumni ==
- Paula Barker, MP for Liverpool Wavertree since 2019.
- Ivy Lilian McClelland, scholar of Spanish
- Christine Tremarco, actress
- Emma Williams, gymnast

== See also ==
- Holly Lodge High School, Smethwick
