= Cain baronets =

Extinct baronetcy in the Baronetage of the United Kingdom

The Cain Baronetcy, of Wargrave in the County of Berkshire, was a title in the Baronetage of the United Kingdom. It was created on 29 January 1920 for Sir William Ernest Cain. He was the third son of Robert Cain, founder of the brewery firm of Robert Cain & Sons, and the elder brother of Charles Alexander Nall-Cain, 1st Baron Brocket. The title became extinct on the death of his son, the second baronet, in 1969.

== Cain baronets, of Wargrave (1920) ==
- Sir William Ernest Cain, Kt., 1st Baronet (1864–1924)
- Sir Ernest Cain, 2nd Baronet (1891–1969)

== See also ==
- Baron Brocket
