= 1931 Liverpool Wavertree by-election =

UK parliamentary by-election

The 1931 Liverpool Wavertree by-election was a parliamentary by-election held in England for the UK House of Commons constituency of Liverpool Wavertree on 23 June 1931. It was won by the Conservative Party candidate Ronald Nall-Cain.

== Vacancy ==
The seat had become vacant when the sitting Conservative Member of Parliament (MP), John Tinne had resigned his seat on 3 June 1931. Tinne had held the seat since the 1924 general election.

== Candidates ==
The Conservative candidate was Ronald Nall-Cain, a wealthy barrister and a Hertfordshire County Councillor, while the Labour Party selected S.L. Treleaven. Neither candidate had previously stood for Parliament.

== Result ==
The Liberal candidate had won nearly 30% of the vote at the 1929 general election, but the party did not contest the by-election. Most of the Liberal vote went to the Conservatives, and on a reduced turnout Nall-Cain held the seat with a massively increased majority.

Nall-Cain was re-elected at the general election in October 1931, and held the seat until the death in late 1934 of his father Charles, whom he succeeded as Baron Brocket, triggering another by-election.

Liverpool Wavertree by-election, 1931
Party	Candidate	Votes	%	±%
Conservative	Ronald Nall-Cain	18,687	65.0	+25.0
Labour	S. L. Treleaven	10,042	35.0	+2.8
Majority		8,645	30.0	+22.2
Turnout		28,729	51.7	−26.4
Conservative hold		Swing	+11.2	

== Previous result ==
General election 1929: Liverpool Wavertree
Party	Candidate	Votes	%	±%
Conservative	John Tinne	16,880	40.0	−7.4
Labour	S. L. Treleaven	13,585	32.2	−2.8
Liberal	H. R. Rathbone	11,723	27.8	+10.2
Majority		3,295	7.8	−4.6
Turnout		42,188	78.1	−2.2
Conservative hold		Swing	−2.3	

== See also ==
- Liverpool Wavertree (UK Parliament constituency)
- 1935 Liverpool Wavertree by-election
- List of United Kingdom by-elections

== Sources ==
- Craig, F. W. S. (1983) [1969]. British parliamentary election results 1918-1949 (3rd ed.). Chichester: Parliamentary Research Services. ISBN 0-900178-06-X.
- Leigh Rayment's Historical List of MPs
