= 1935 Liverpool Wavertree by-election =

UK parliamentary by-election

The 1935 Liverpool Wavertree by-election was a by-election held in England for the UK House of Commons constituency of Liverpool Wavertree on 6 February 1935. It was won by the Labour Party candidate Joseph Cleary.

== Vacancy ==
The seat had become vacant when the sitting Conservative Member of Parliament (MP), Ronald Nall-Cain had succeeded to the peerage as Baron Brocket. He had held the seat since a by-election in 1931.

== Electoral history ==
General election October 1931: Liverpool Wavertree
Party	Candidate	Votes	%	±%
Conservative	Ronald Nall-Cain	33,476	77.9	+12.9
Labour	C. G. Clark	9,504	22.1	−12.9
Majority		23,972	55.8	+25.8
Turnout		42,980	75.2	−3.9
Conservative hold		Swing	+12.9	

== Candidates ==
The Conservative candidate was James Platt, but Randolph Churchill (son of the future Prime Minister Winston Churchill) stood as an "independent Conservative". The Labour Party candidate was 32-year-old Joseph Cleary, a local magistrate.

The Liberal Party selected 49-year-old Liverpool solicitor, Tudor Artro Morris as their candidate. Morris had contested Wallasey for the Liberals at the 1922 and 1923 general elections. He was educated at the Liverpool Institute and Liverpool University.

== Result ==
With the Conservative vote split between the official candidate and the independent Churchill, the result was a victory for the Labour candidate, Joseph Jackson Cleary, who took the seat on a swing of 30%.

Liverpool Wavertree by-election, 1935
Party	Candidate	Votes	%	±%
Labour	Joseph Cleary	15,611	35.3	+13.2
Conservative	James Platt	13,711	31.2	−46.7
Ind. Conservative	Randolph Churchill	10,575	23.9	New
Liberal	Tudor Artro Morris	4,208	9.5	New
Majority		1,840	4.1	N/A
Turnout		44,165	72.3	−2.9
Labour gain from Conservative		Swing	−30.0	

== Aftermath ==
Cleary was unseated at the 1935 general election by the Conservative Peter Shaw, who held the seat until he stood down at the 1945 general election.

== See also ==
- Liverpool Wavertree (UK Parliament constituency)
- 1931 Liverpool Wavertree by-election
- List of United Kingdom by-elections
- United Kingdom by-election records

== Sources ==
- Craig, F. W. S. (1983) [1969]. British parliamentary election results 1918-1949 (3rd ed.). Chichester: Parliamentary Research Services. ISBN 0-900178-06-X.
- Leigh Rayment's Historical List of MPs
