= Paula Barker =

British Labour politician

Paula Barker MP
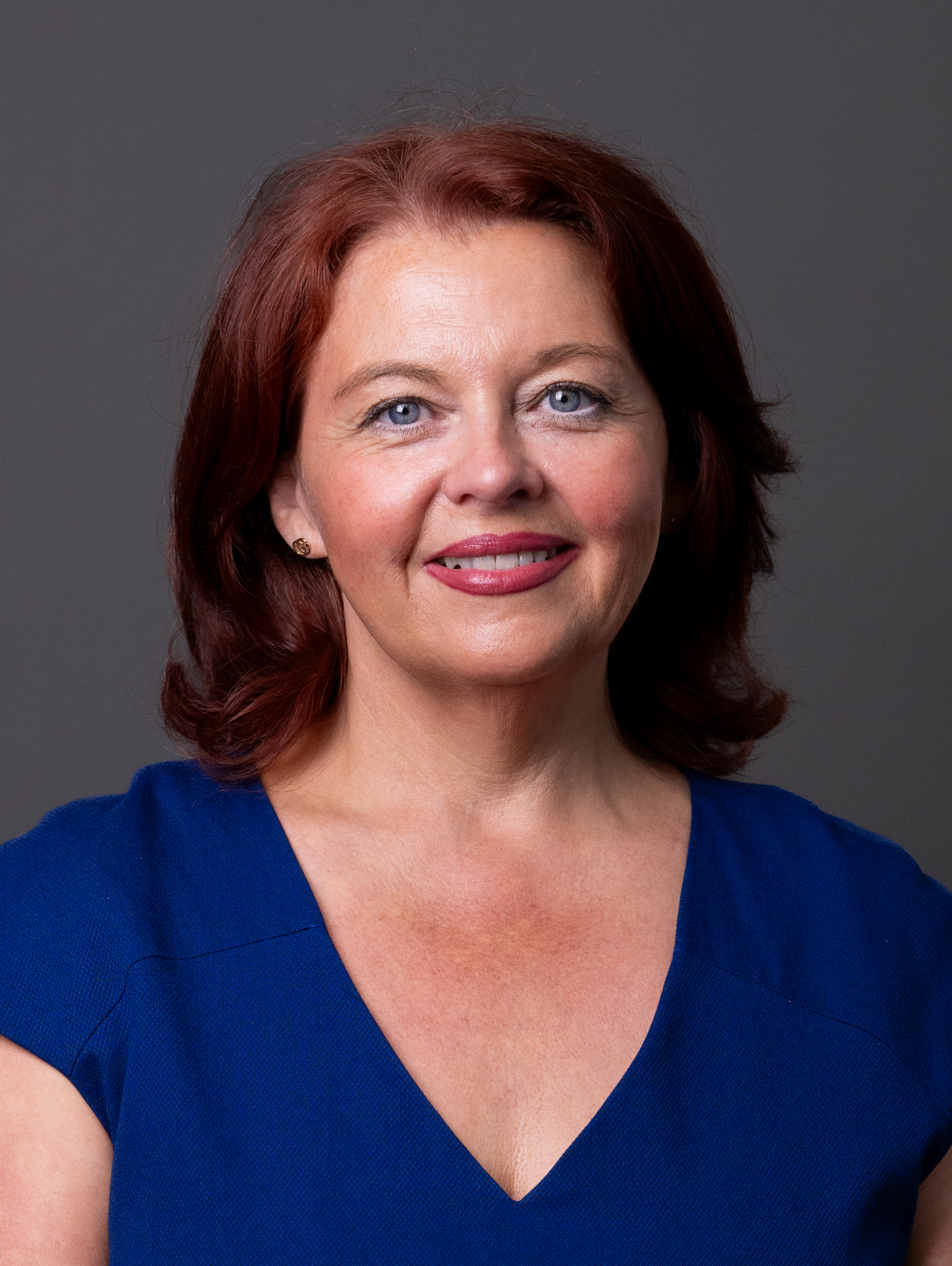
- Official portrait, 2026

Member of Parliament for Liverpool Wavertree
- Incumbent
- Assumed office 12 December 2019
- Preceded by: Luciana Berger
- Majority: 16,304 (41.0%)
Shadow portfolios
Shadow Minister for Devolution and English Regions
In office September 2023 – 15 November 2023
Leader	Keir Starmer
Preceded by	Alex Norris
Succeeded by	Jim McMahon
Shadow Minister for Homelessness and Rough Sleeping
In office 28 October 2022 – September 2023
Leader	Keir Starmer
Preceded by	Sarah Owen
Succeeded by	Mike Amesbury

Personal details
- Born: 9 May 1972 (age 54) Liverpool, England
- Party: Labour
- Children: 2
- Website: Official website

Paula Barker (born 9 May 1972) is a British Labour Party politician who has served as the Member of Parliament (MP) for Liverpool Wavertree since 2019. She served as the Shadow Minister for Devolution and the English Regions from September 2023 to November 2023.

Before her election, Barker worked as a local government officer in the North West. She was also the Unison North West Regional Convenor, as well as the leader of her local government branch in Halton, Cheshire.

== Early life and education ==
Paula Barker was born on 9 May 1972 at Sefton General Hospital in Wavertree, Liverpool. Her father died two weeks before her second birthday, leaving her mother to raise her as a single parent. Barker attended Holly Lodge Girls' High School in West Derby, Liverpool.

== Early career ==
Barker was employed in local government for almost 30 years. She moved from Liverpool City Council for a promotion at neighbouring Knowsley Council to work in Customer Services, where she spent around four years. In 2001, she joined Halton Borough Council, where she progressively became more active in her trade union, UNISON. She held the position of Halton Branch Secretary for UNISON and in May 2015 became its North West Regional Convenor, taking over from Angela Rayner, who resigned her position to serve as MP for Ashton-under-Lyne, which she won in the 2015 parliamentary election.

== Parliamentary career ==
=== 2019–2024 ===
At the 2019 general election, Barker was elected to Parliament as MP for Liverpool Wavertree with 72.2% of the vote and a majority of 27,085. Barker made her maiden speech on 4 February 2020, becoming one of the first of the new MPs from the 2019 general election to do so. In it, she outlined the rich diversity of the Liverpool Wavertree constituency and said that local representatives, rather than the Secretary of State for Housing, Communities and Local Government, know what is best for their constituencies.

As an opposition MP, Barker called upon the Conservative Government to enact meaningful reform of the social care market. She also sponsored the Private Members Bill put forward by Mike Amesbury, Labour MP for Weaver Vale, on proposed changes to the law regarding school uniforms.

Barker served as a member of the Justice Select Committee between May 2020 and July 2021 and is currently a Member of Home Affairs Select Committee. She became PPS to Shadow Defence Minister John Healey in March 2022.

In February 2022, Barker was re-selected as the Labour candidate for the new Liverpool Wavertree constituency to stand at the 2024 general election.

She was appointed Shadow Minister for Homelessness and Rough Sleeping on 28 October 2022. In the 2023 British shadow cabinet reshuffle, she was appointed Shadow Minister for Devolution and the English Regions.

She is a member of Labour Friends of Palestine and the Middle East. On 15 November 2023, she resigned from the frontbench to vote for a SNP motion demanding a ceasefire in Gaza.

In May 2024, PoliticsHome reported that Barker had left the Socialist Campaign Group of Labour MPs.

=== 2024 to date ===
Barker was re-elected to Parliament as MP for Liverpool Wavertree at the 2024 general election with a decreased vote share of 58% and a decreased majority of 16,304.

In October 2024 she was appointed to the Parliamentary Committee on Standards as well as the Parliamentary Committee on Privileges and serves as Vice Chair of both. She also remains Co-Chair of the all-party parliamentary group for ending homelessness and rough sleeping.

Barker was a candidate for the 2025 Labour Party deputy leadership election, but pulled out after not achieving the required backing of 80 MPs.

== Personal life ==
Barker is married with two sons.

Parliament of the United Kingdom
Preceded by Luciana Berger	Member of Parliament for Liverpool Wavertree; 2019–present	Incumbent
