= Nathan Raw =

British politician (1866–1940)

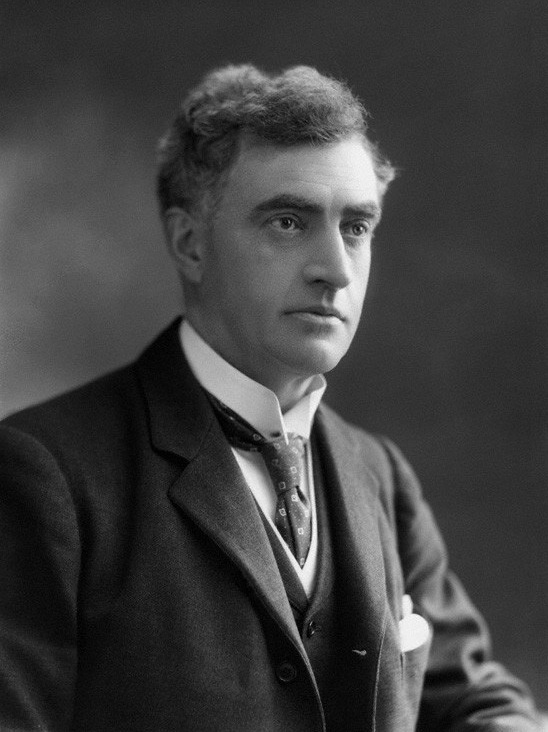
Nathan Raw in 1919

Lieutenant-Colonel Nathan Raw CMG MP FRSE (2 August 1866 – 28 August 1940) was a British Conservative Party politician and physician well known for his work on tuberculosis and also in the field of medical psychology.

Raw was president of the Medico-Psychological Association and president of the Tuberculosis Society of Great Britain.

In 1915, he coined the term trench nephritis.

== Personal life ==
Raw began his education at the Royal Grammar School, Newcastle upon Tyne, and received his medical qualification (M. B.) from Durham University in 1888. The same year he received his certificate in Psychological Medicine from Westminster Hospital, London. During his time at college he received many prizes and in 1892 Received a Gaskell Gold Medal for his work in Psychological medicine. He received his M.D in 1891 form Durham University while working as the Senior Medical Officer at Bolton Infirmary.

He married Annie Louisa Strong in 1897.

He died in London on 28 August 1940.

== Physician ==
Raw began as the senior resident surgical assistant to the Royal Infirmary, Newcastle upon Tyne in January 1886 and by June was chosen as the senior resident medical assistant. In 1887, he was elected resident clinical officer and pathologist to the Durham County Asylum. By 1889, he held the position of assistant medical officer for the Kent County Asylum and was elected as a member to the Medico-Psychological Association. In the same year he became the assistant medical-superintendent at Portsmouth Lunatic Asylum and held the position until at least January 1891. Raw stayed in Bolton until March 1893 when he became the medical-superintendent and pathologist at Dundee Royal Infirmary. In 1897, Raw was one of 58 applicants for the role of medical superintendent at the recently refurbished Mill Road Infirmary and he was appointed to the position in August 1897. Mill Road Infirmary was the largest Poor Law hospital in Liverpool and the recipient of the West Derby Union patients. In 1922, Raw became the Lord Chancellor's visitor in lunacy after the retirement of Dr. James Crichton-Browne. He held the position until his retirement in 1938 after which he was replaced by Dr. Albert Edward Evans.

In his later years he had a general consulting practice in London and presided over three professional organisations: the Royal Medico-Psychological Association, the Hunterian Society, and the Tuberculosis Association. He was the President of the Royal Medico-Psychological Society (1929–30) and for 14 years Chairman of its Parliamentary Committee.

He was also fellow for the Royal Society Edinburgh, the Royal Meteorological Society, member of the Medical Psychological and British Medical Associations as well as the British Member of International Committee for Prevention of Consumption.

== Focus of research ==
Raw was most famous for his study on tuberculosis and the tuberculin ‘R’ and a great deal of that expertise came due his position at Mill Road Infirmary. During his Mill Road years he continued to publish on epilepsy, infections and their treatment, gynaecology, aneurisms, arsenic poisonings and the epidemic that was going on in Liverpool and Manchester at the beginning of the 20th century, as well as one paper on mental disease.

== Military service ==
During the First World War Raw served as lieutenant-colonel and commanding officer of the last 1st Western General Hospital, Lancashire, and also as commanding officer and senior physician of the Liverpool Hospital of the B.E.F. in France. Raw served with the Royal Army Medical Corps He was appointed a Companion of the Order of St Michael and St George in the 1918 New Year Honours.

== Member of Parliament ==
At the general election in December 1918, Raw was elected as the Member of Parliament (MP) for Liverpool Wavertree. He did not stand again at the 1922 general election.

Parliament of the United Kingdom
New constituency	Member of Parliament for Liverpool Wavertree; 1918 – 1922	Succeeded by Sir Harold Smith
