= Scream! If You Want to Get Off =

British television program

- Genre: Game show
- Presented by: Lord Brocket
- Starring: Nigel Marven
- Country of origin: United Kingdom
- Original language: English

Production
- Production location: South Africa

Original release
- Network: ITV; ITV2
- Release: 1 January – 12 March 2005

Scream! If You Want to Get Off is a British television programme, first broadcast on Saturday nights on ITV in January 2005.

The show, presented by 'toff' The 3rd Baron Brocket, was set in South Africa. There were two teams, a red team, and a blue team who compete, not just against each other, but against wildlife expert Nigel Marven. One person from each team, and Nigel Marven had to compete in challenges, similar to TV's Fear Factor and the Bushtucker Trials from I'm a Celebrity... Get Me Out of Here!. The winner would receive £50,000. Nigel Marven was competing for charity. However, the show failed to captivate viewers and the show only attracted around 3.5-4.5 million viewers, poor for primetime on Saturday. After just three transmissions the show was axed completely from ITV. The remaining episodes were aired on Sunday mornings on ITV2.

== See also ==
- List of television shows notable for negative reception
