= Charles Nall-Cain, 3rd Baron Brocket =

British baron and television presenter (born 1952)

The Right Honourable The Lord Brocket
- Born: 12 February 1952 (age 74)
- Education: Eton College
- Occupations: British peer, television star, business owner
- Television: I'm a Celebrity... Get Me Out of Here! Scream! If You Want to Get Off; Bad Lads Army; Can't Pay? We'll Take It Away!
- Criminal charge: Insurance fraud
- Criminal penalty: Five years imprisonment
- Criminal status: Time served
- Spouses: Isabell Maria Lorenzo (m. 1982; div. 1994) Harriet Victoria Warren (m. 2006)
- Children: 5
- Relatives: Ronald Nall-Cain, 2nd Baron Brocket (grandfather)

Charles Ronald George Nall-Cain, 3rd Baron Brocket (born 12 February 1952), also known as Charlie Brocket, is a British peer, business owner and television presenter.

== Biography ==
Brocket is the son of Ronald Nall-Cain and Elizabeth Trotter. His father died when he was nine years old. At fifteen, he became the 3rd Baron Brocket following the death of his grandfather, Arthur Nall-Cain, 2nd Baron Brocket, also inheriting Brocket Hall in Hertfordshire. He retains ownership of the estate through a trust, established following his conviction for insurance fraud in the 1990s. The property was leased to German hotelier Dieter Klostermann in 1996, and later operated by Chinese businessman Yu Songbo from 2016. After financial difficulties, the operating company was sold out of administration in 2020 to Brocket Hall (Holding) Limited.

Lord Brocket is an Old Etonian and served in the 14th/20th King's Hussars as a Lieutenant in Germany. He became known as a playboy and, in the 1980s and early 1990s, for his collection of classic cars, once owning forty-two Ferraris. He was convicted of insurance fraud in 1996 and sentenced to five years in prison, of which he served two and a half years.

In 2004, he was a contestant on the third series of I'm a Celebrity... Get Me Out of Here!. Finishing in fourth place. His autobiography, Call Me Charlie, was published in hardback in 2004.

Brocket hosted the ITV game show Scream! If You Want to Get Off, and presented Privates Exposed, a behind-the-scenes programme for Lads Army, on ITV2.

In 2007, he launched his own Brocket Hall Foods range of groceries.

In 2017, Brocket was featured in an episode of Can't Pay? We'll Take It Away! (Series 5, Episode 15).

On 29 August 2025, Brocket was arrested on suspicion of rape and charged the following day with two counts of rape and one count of sexual assault by penetration, relating to alleged incidents in London and East Sussex. He appeared at Westminster Magistrates’ Court, where he was granted bail with conditions, including GPS-monitored exclusion from the M25 area. He was initially due to appear at Isleworth Crown Court on 26 September 2025. Given the backlog of cases, his trial is now set for 1 November 2027, with a pre-trial review on 7 October 2027.

== Marriage and family history ==
In 1982, he married former Vogue model Isabell Maria Lorenzo. They have three children including Antalya Stephanie Lauren Nall-Cain, who married Prince Frederick Alexander of Prussia, a descendant of Queen Victoria. Brocket and Lorenzo divorced in 1994.

In 2006 he married Harriet Victoria Warren, with whom he is reported to have two daughters.

Coat of arms of Charles Nall-Cain, 3rd Baron Brocket
Notes Granted 29 October 1928 by Sir Nevile Rodwell Wilkinson, Ulster King of Arms. Crest On wreaths of the colours 1st a cat saliant guardant Erminois holding between the paws a dexter hand couped Gules (Cain) 2nd a bee Proper between two roses Gules barbed seeded stalked and leaved Proper (Nall). Escutcheon Quarterly 1st & 4th Argent three salmon haurient Gules in chief an oak tree eradicated Proper (Cain) 2nd & 3rd Argent a bee Proper between three roses Gules (Nall). Supporters Two cats guardant Erminois Motto Felis Demucta Mitis

Peerage of the United Kingdom
Preceded by Arthur Nall-Cain	Baron Brocket; 1967–present	Incumbent; Heir apparent: Alexander Nall-Cain
