= John Tilney =

Sir John Dudley Robert Tarleton Tilney, TD (19 December 1907 – 26 April 1994) was a British Conservative politician. He was member of parliament (MP) for Liverpool Wavertree from 1950 until his retirement at the February 1974 general election. He was Under-Secretary of State for Commonwealth Relations from 1962 to 1964.

He was the great-grandson of the founder of RJ Tilney & Co. John Tilney was educated at Eton College. He was persuaded by John Brocklebank, the co-head of RJ Tilney & Co to begin with the firm in October 1928 before he had finished his degree course at Magdalen College, Oxford. He became a member of the Stock Exchange in December 1932 and was admitted to the partnership in April 1933.

== Personal life ==
He was the second husband of Dame Guinevere Hunter Tilney, Lady Tilney, DBE (née Grant; 8 September 1916 – died 4 April 1997), whose affiliations included:

- Vice-president, National Council of Women of Great Britain (1958–61)
- President, National Council of Women of Great Britain (1968–70)
- UK Representative on United Nations Commission on Status of Women (1970–73)

Parliament of the United Kingdom
Preceded by Victor Raikes	Member of Parliament for Liverpool Wavertree; 1950–February 1974	Succeeded by Anthony Steen
