= Joseph Cleary =

British Labour Party politician

Sir Joseph Cleary J.P.

Lord Mayor of Liverpool
- In office 1949–1950
- Preceded by: Walter Thomas Lancashire
- Succeeded by: Harry Dixon Longbottom

Member of Parliament for Liverpool Wavertree
- In office 6 February 1935 – 25 October 1935
- Preceded by: Ronald Nall-Cain
- Succeeded by: Peter Stapleton Shaw

Personal details
- Born: 26 October 1902
- Died: 9 February 1993 (aged 90)
- Party: Labour

Sir Joseph Jackson Cleary, JP (26 October 1902 – 9 February 1993) was a British Labour Party politician.

== Early life ==
Joseph Cleary was born in the West Derby district of Liverpool 26 October 1902 . He was educated at Holy Trinity School, Anfield and at Skerry's College, Liverpool.

== Career ==
Cleary was appointed a Liverpool justice of the peace in 1927. A member of the Labour Party, he contested the 1929 East Toxteth by-election and fought the seat again at the general election later that year, performing creditably in a safe Conservative seat. In the 1931 general election Cleary fought the West Derby division of Liverpool. This was a terrible year for Labour and his Conservative opponent trounced him by over 23,000 votes. He was the councillor for Garston ward from 1927 to 1941.

In 1934, Liverpool Wavertree's Conservative Member of Parliament (MP) Ronald Nall-Cain succeeded to the peerage, and Cleary was selected as the Labour candidate for the resulting by-election on 6 February 1935. With the Conservative vote split by the presence of Winston Churchill's son Randolph as an independent Conservative candidate, Cleary won the seat with the largest swing ever recorded between the Conservative and Labour parties. At 30% (from Conservative to Labour) it remains unsurpassed to this day.

Cleary's victory was to last just 281 days, making him one of the shortest-serving MPs of the 20th century. At the general election in November 1935, he lost by almost 8,000 votes in a straight fight with the Conservatives.

== Later life ==
Cleary was made an Alderman of Liverpool in 1941 and leader of the Labour group from 1935 to 1948. He undertook lecture-tours to British Forces in the Middle East in 1945. Later that year he married Ethel McColl. He was Lord Mayor of Liverpool 1949–50.

Twenty years after losing his seat in the House of Commons, he re-entered the fray to contest Liverpool Walton in the 1955 general election. This is the longest gap recorded of any former MP in trying to return to Parliament. He was unsuccessful, but did obtain a small swing against the national trend.

He was knighted in the 1965 Queen's Birthday Honours List and made a Freeman of the City of Liverpool in 1970. Cleary served as a director of the Mersey Docks and Harbour Board until 1970.

He died in Garston on 9 February 1993, aged 90.

Sir Joseph Cleary enjoyed one of the longest post-service lifespans of any former MP, at 57 years and 87 days. This record was broken in October 2002 by Horace Trevor-Cox.

== See also ==
List of United Kingdom MPs with the shortest service

- UK by-election records

== Notes and references ==
Parliament of the United Kingdom
Preceded by Ronald Nall-Cain	Member of Parliament for Liverpool Wavertree; February 1935–November 1935	Succeeded by Peter Shaw
