= John Tinné =

British politician

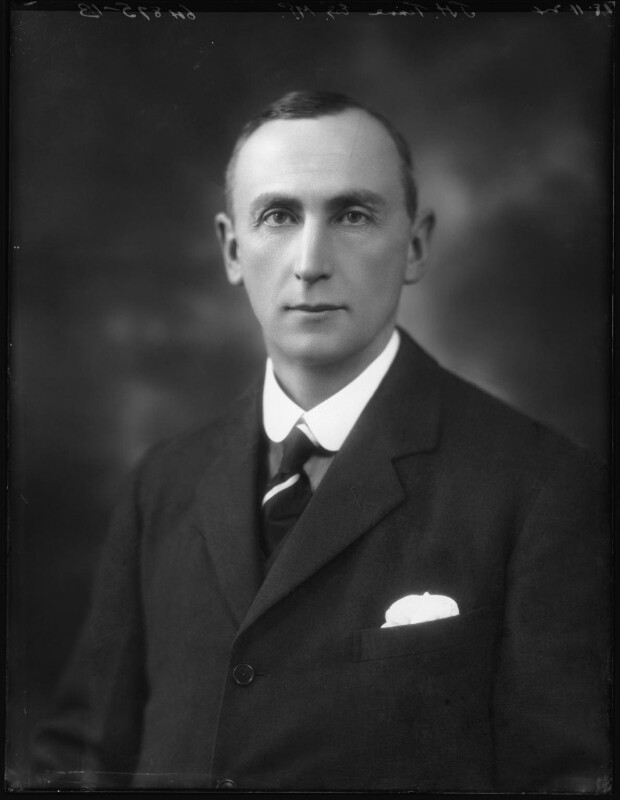
Tinné in 1924

John Abraham Tinné (1877–1933), sometimes spelt Tinne, was a British politician. He was elected as a Conservative Member of Parliament at the 1924 general election, representing Liverpool Wavertree. He resigned in 1931 through appointment as Steward of the Chiltern Hundreds.

Tinné was a partner in the long-established firm of Sandbach, Tinne & Company that had been founded by one of his ancestors.

Parliament of the United Kingdom
Preceded by Hugh Rathbone	Member of Parliament for Liverpool Wavertree; 1924 – 1931	Succeeded by Ronald Nall-Cain
