= Arthur Nall-Cain, 2nd Baron Brocket =

British politician (1904-1967)

The Right Honourable The Lord Brocket KStJ
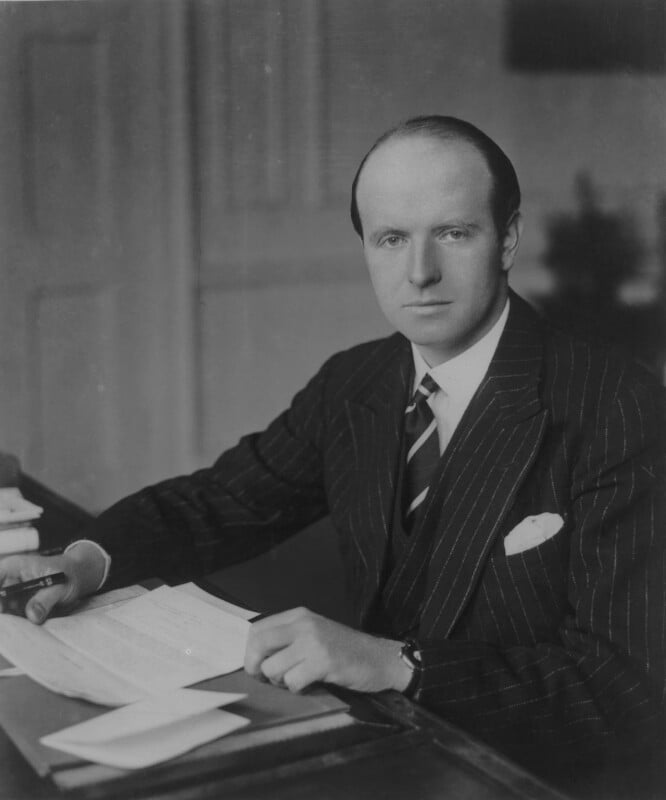
- Brocket in the 1930s

Member of Parliament for Liverpool Wavertree
- In office 23 June 1931 – 1934
- Preceded by: John Tinné
- Succeeded by: Joseph Cleary

Personal details
- Born: Arthur Ronald Nall Nall-Cain; 4 August 1904
- Died: 24 March 1967 (aged 62)
- Party: Conservative; British People's Party
- Spouse: Angela Beatrix Pennyman
- Children: 3
- Parent: Charles Nall-Cain, 1st Baron Brocket (father)
- Relatives: Charles Nall-Cain, 3rd Baron Brocket (grandson); Christopher Taylour, 7th Marquess of Headfort (grandson)
- Education: Eton College; Oxford University

Arthur Ronald Nall Nall-Cain, 2nd Baron Brocket KStJ (4 August 1904 – 24 March 1967) was a prominent British Nazi sympathiser and Conservative Party politician in the United Kingdom.

== Early life ==
He was born into a millionaire brewing family on 4 August 1904. His father, Charles Nall-Cain, was created a baronet in 1921 and Baron Brocket of Brocket Hall in 1933. After his death a year later, Arthur succeeded to his titles.

Nall-Cain was educated at Eton College and Oxford University, where he captained the golf team. He became a barrister and a Hertfordshire County Councillor.

== Political career ==
He was elected as Conservative Member of Parliament (MP) for Liverpool Wavertree at a by-election in 1931, and was a close associate of Neville Chamberlain. After his father died, Nall-Cain was required to leave the House of Commons as he was elevated to the House of Lords.

== Nazi sympathiser ==
Brocket became known in society as a Nazi sympathiser. He became a committed member of the Anglo-German Fellowship, and his homes were used for entertaining supporters of Germany. Brocket, who considered Minister for Foreign Affairs Joachim von Ribbentrop a close personal friend, was so enamoured with Nazi Germany, he attended Hitler's 50th birthday celebration in Berlin in 1939. According to Neville Chamberlain, Foreign Secretary, the Earl of Halifax used Brocket as a conduit to convey the views of the British government to the leading German Nazis.

At the outbreak of World War II in September 1939, Brocket continued to work for an understanding between Britain and Germany. He urged a negotiated peace settlement and tried to arrange talks with Hitler. He had contact with Hermann Göring through the Swedish ornithologist Bengt Berg. Brocket also worked closely with the historian Arthur Bryant, who shared his far right views, to bring the negotiations to the attention of the UK Foreign Office. However, Brocket was informed that the proposal to grant Germany control over Poland and Czechoslovakia was not acceptable to the British government. Brocket was interned at the outbreak of war and his properties sequestrated by the War Office.

== Landowner ==
In the 1930s, Brocket bought Inverie House and the Knoydart estate in Lochaber, Scotland. He would eventually own 13,000 acres (53 km^{2}) in England and 62,000 in Scotland. As an absentee landlord, he only used the Knoydart estate for shooting and fishing while opposing the rights of crofters and dismissing and evicting workers. At the outbreak of war, the house and estate was taken over by the British Army when Brocket was interned; it was used to train commandos and SOE agents. After the war, the British government returned ownership of the estate to Brocket. He ordered that anything which might have been used or touched by SOE agents removed from Inverie House; all the cutlery, crockery and toilets were dumped in the sea at the mouth of Loch Nevis.

In 1948, some returning Highland soldiers, who would become known as Seven Men of Knoydart, decided to take a stand against Brocket and the way he managed his estate. The group claimed portions of the Knoydart estate in a land raid. But after Brocket took legal action to get them evicted, the group agreed to vacate the land as a good faith action for court. However, once they left they were dispossessed and they lost the case. Shortly afterwards Brocket sold the Knoydart estate. In 1949, he bought the Carton House estate in Ireland.

== Personal life ==
Brocket inherited Brocket Hall in Hertfordshire, and bought Bramshill House in Hampshire in 1936. In 1927, Brocket married Angela Beatrix Pennyman, younger daughter of Rev. Preb. William Geoffrey Pennyman of Ormesby Hall in Yorkshire. Together, they were the parents of:

- Ronald Charles Manus Nall-Cain (1928–1961), eldest son and heir apparent, who pre-deceased his father, having in 1950 married Elizabeth Mary Stallard, a daughter of R.J. Stallard of Bake House, Petersfield, Hampshire.
- David Lawrence Robert Nall-Cain (born 1930), 2nd son, who inherited Carton House from his father. He married Katherine Elizabeth Palmer, a daughter of William Matthew Palmer, Viscount Wolmer (1912-1942), eldest son and heir apparent of Roundell Palmer, 3rd Earl of Selborne (1887–1971). In 1977 he sold Carton to the Mallaghan family.
- Elizabeth Angela Veronica Rose Nall-Cain (born 1938), wife of Thomas Taylour, 6th Marquess of Headfort.

=== Descendants ===
Through his eldest son, he was a grandfather to convicted fraudster Charles Ronald George Nall-Cain, 3rd Baron Brocket (b. 1952), of Brocket Hall, and great-grandfather of Princess Antalya of Prussia (daughter of the 3rd Lord Brocket), and through his daughter grandfather to Christopher Taylour, 7th Marquess of Headfort.

Coat of arms of Arthur Nall-Cain, 2nd Baron Brocket
Notes Granted 29 October 1928 by Sir Nevile Rodwell Wilkinson, Ulster King of Arms. Crest On wreaths of the colours 1st a cat saliant guardant Erminois holding between the paws a dexter hand couped Gules (Cain) 2nd a bee Proper between two roses Gules barbed seeded stalked and leaved Proper (Nall). Escutcheon Quarterly 1st & 4th Argent three salmon haurient Gules in chief an oak tree eradicated Proper (Cain) 2nd & 3rd Argent a bee Proper between three roses Gules (Nall). Supporters Two cats guardant Erminois Motto Felis Demucta Mitis

== Death ==
Nall-Cain died on 24 March 1967 and was succeeded by his grandson, Charles.

Parliament of the United Kingdom
Preceded by John Tinné	Member of Parliament for Liverpool Wavertree; 1931–1934	Succeeded by Joseph Cleary
Peerage of the United Kingdom
Preceded by Charles Nall-Cain	Baron Brocket; 1934–1967	Succeeded by Charles Nall-Cain
