= Baile Hoose =

Squat in Glasgow, Scotland

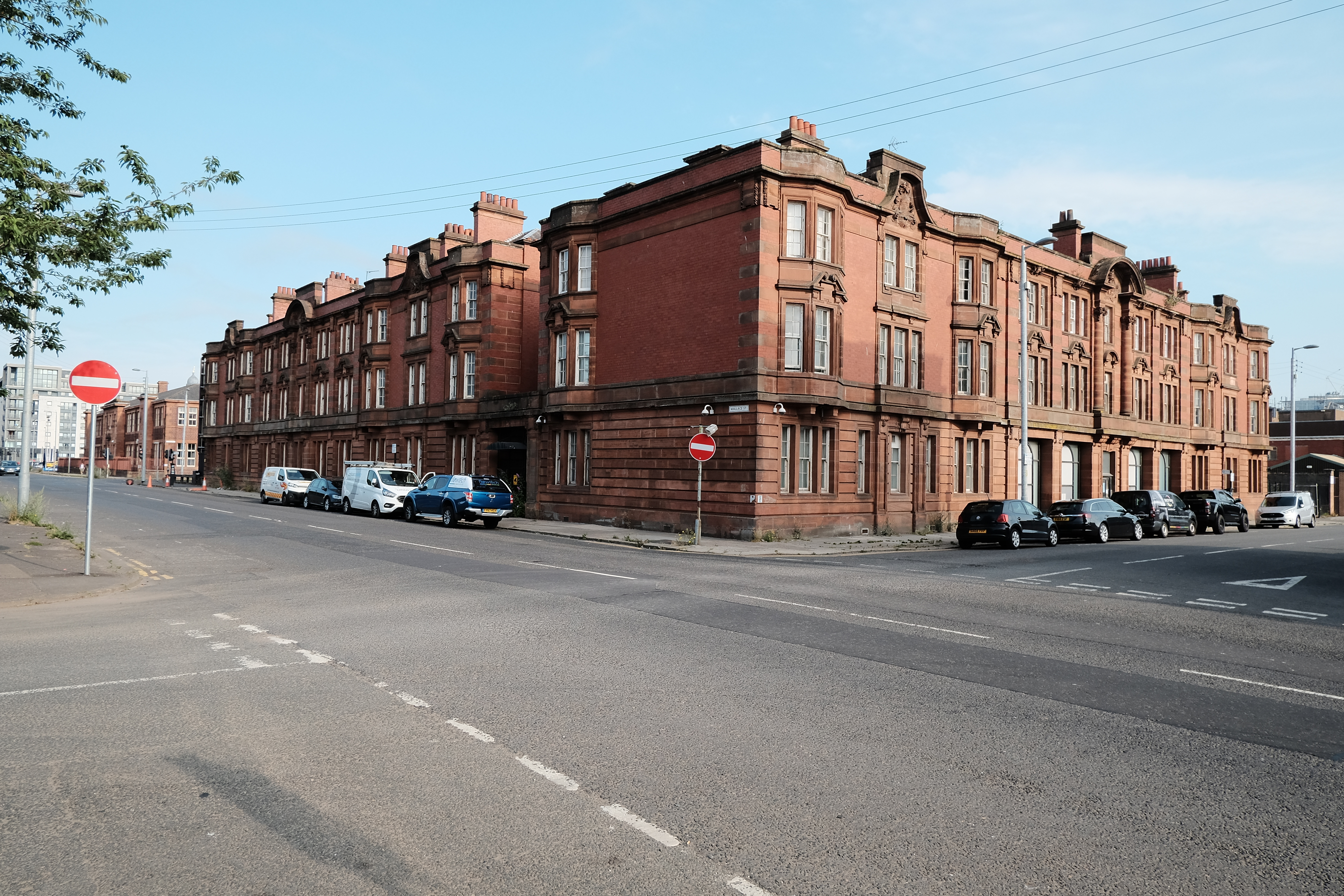
190 Centre Street, Glasgow

Baile Hoose was a squat in Glasgow, Scotland during and briefly after the 2021 COP26. Concerns grew before the conference that there were not enough accommodation spaces to house the 25,000 delegates, so housing activists occupied a former housing shelter and offered food and place to sleep. The action was supported by Members of the Scottish Parliament (MSPs) but not Glasgow City Council, which took legal action to regain possession of the building.

== Background ==
COP26 took place at the SEC Centre in Glasgow, Scotland between 31 October to 13 November 2021. In the preceding months, concerns grew that there were not enough accommodation spaces for all delegates, with 15,000 hotel rooms available for 25,000 visitors. In early September 1,783 still needed a place to stay and later in the month indigenous elders from Minga Indígena warned Members of the Scottish Parliament (MSPs) that they knew of 100 representatives still lacking accommodation.

== Occupation ==
In early November, housing activists announced that they had squatted the former Hamish Allan Centre at 180 Centre Street in Tradeston, Glasgow, as a means to provide free places to stay for anyone attending the conference. The centre is owned by Glasgow City Council and had been a shelter for homeless people and asylum seekers before being closed at the beginning of the Covid-19 pandemic. The occupation was supported by MSPs Patrick Harvie, Paul Sweeney and Mercedes Villalba.

The squatters intended to use the building to house people during COP26 and then relinquish it. They called the occupation Baile Hoose. On 8 November, they claimed that police officers from London and Wales had broken into the building at 3am and threatened people, before being calmed by liaison officers from Police Scotland. Glasgow City Council commented that it had already asked the squatters to leave the building since it was concerned about the water supply and the presence of asbestos. Police Scotland later denied that a raid had taken place. A report on policing at COP26 copublished by the Article 111 Trust and the Network for Police Monitoring confirmed CCTV footage existed of senior officers from London and Wales breaking in to the building.

== Eviction ==
Following the end of COP26, the activists decided to maintain occupation of Baile Hoose in order to provide a housing shelter for people in Glasgow. The council maintained the building was not suitable and took the squatters to court. The squatters crowdfunded their legal defence and requested for an adjournment, but on 24 November, the sheriff ruled in favour of eviction.
