= Hugh Rathbone =

British merchant and politician

Hugh Reynolds Rathbone (4 April 1862 – 19 January 1940) was a British merchant and politician, who sat as a member of parliament (MP) and was a member of the noted Rathbone family of Liverpool.

The eldest son of Richard Reynolds Rathbone and Frances Susannah (née Roberts), he was educated at Eton College and Trinity College, Cambridge, obtaining his B.A. in 1884 and his M.A. in 1888.

In October 1888, he married Emily Evelyn Rathbone (1865–1953), his cousin, the daughter of William Rathbone VI. They had four children:

- Hannah Mary ("Nancy", later Warr 1889–1995)
- Richard Reynolds (1891–1962)
- Edward Reynolds ("Teddy" 1892–1913)
- Hugo Ponsonby (1895–1969)

He was a grain merchant, becoming a partner of the Liverpool firm of Ross T. Smyth and Co. in 1889, until his retirement in 1924. He served as a member of the Royal Commission on Wheat Supplies during the First World War, involved in the purchase and distribution of large supplies of grain for the use of Great Britain and the Allies. He represented the Liverpool Corn Trade Association on the Mersey Docks and Harbour Board, 1905–1933.

He was closely involved with the University of Liverpool. On the founding of the university in 1903 he became its first treasurer, was president of the council from 1918 to 1924, and in 1920 was elected pro-chancellor. He made many gifts to the university, including parts of the family Liverpool estate, Greenbank, to provide student accommodation.

As an active Liberal, he elected as member of parliament (MP) for Liverpool Wavertree at the 1923 general election, but was heavily defeated at the 1924 election. He stood again in 1929 general election, increasing his vote but repeating the third place which he had achieved in 1924. He and his wife Emily founded the Liberal Party Garmoyle Institute in Smithdown Road, Liverpool.

He was president of Manchester College, Oxford (now named Harris Manchester College) from 1925 to 1928.

He died on 19 January 1940, aged 77.

Parliament of the United Kingdom
Preceded by Sir Harold Smith	Member of Parliament for Liverpool Wavertree; 1923 – 1924	Succeeded by John Tinné
