= Trespass (Scotland) Act 1865 =

Act of the Parliament of the United Kingdom

Trespass (Scotland) Act 1865 (Note: Section 1.)
- Act of Parliament
- Parliament of the United Kingdom
- Long title: An Act to provide for the better Prevention of Trespass in Scotland.
- Citation: 28 & 29 Vict. c. 56
- Territorial extent: United Kingdom

Dates
- Royal assent: 29 June 1865
- Commencement: 29 June 1865 (Note: The Acts of Parliament (Commencement) Act 1793.)
Other legislation
Amended by	Sheriff Courts (Scotland) Act 1971; Criminal Justice Act 1982; Roads (Scotland) Act 1984; Land Reform (Scotland) Act 2003; Criminal Justice (Scotland) Act 2016

Status: Amended

Text of statute as originally enacted

Revised text of statute as amended

Text of the Trespass (Scotland) Act 1865 as in force today (including any amendments) within the United Kingdom, from legislation.gov.uk.

The Trespass (Scotland) Act 1865 (28 & 29 Vict. c. 56) is an act of the Parliament of the United Kingdom.

The act creates a criminal offence of trespass in Scotland in certain circumstances and applies a penalty which has been amended by the Criminal Justice Act 1982 to that of a fine not exceeding Level 1 on the standard scale for violation. As of 2011, this was £200.

The act applies to a wide variety of private property, although only to lodging, squatting and encampment on such property. Between 2005 and 2010, there were 26 convictions.

== Subsequent developments ==
In section 3 of the act, the words from " turnpike " to " other " were repealed by section 1(1) of, and part VI of schedule 1 to, the Statute Law (Repeals) Act 1973, which came into force on 18 July 1973.

Subsequent legislation, such as the Land Reform (Scotland) Act 2003, has created more general rights of access and encampment on private land in certain circumstances, with specific exclusions.
