= Luciana Berger =

British Labour politician

The Right Honourable The Baroness Berger
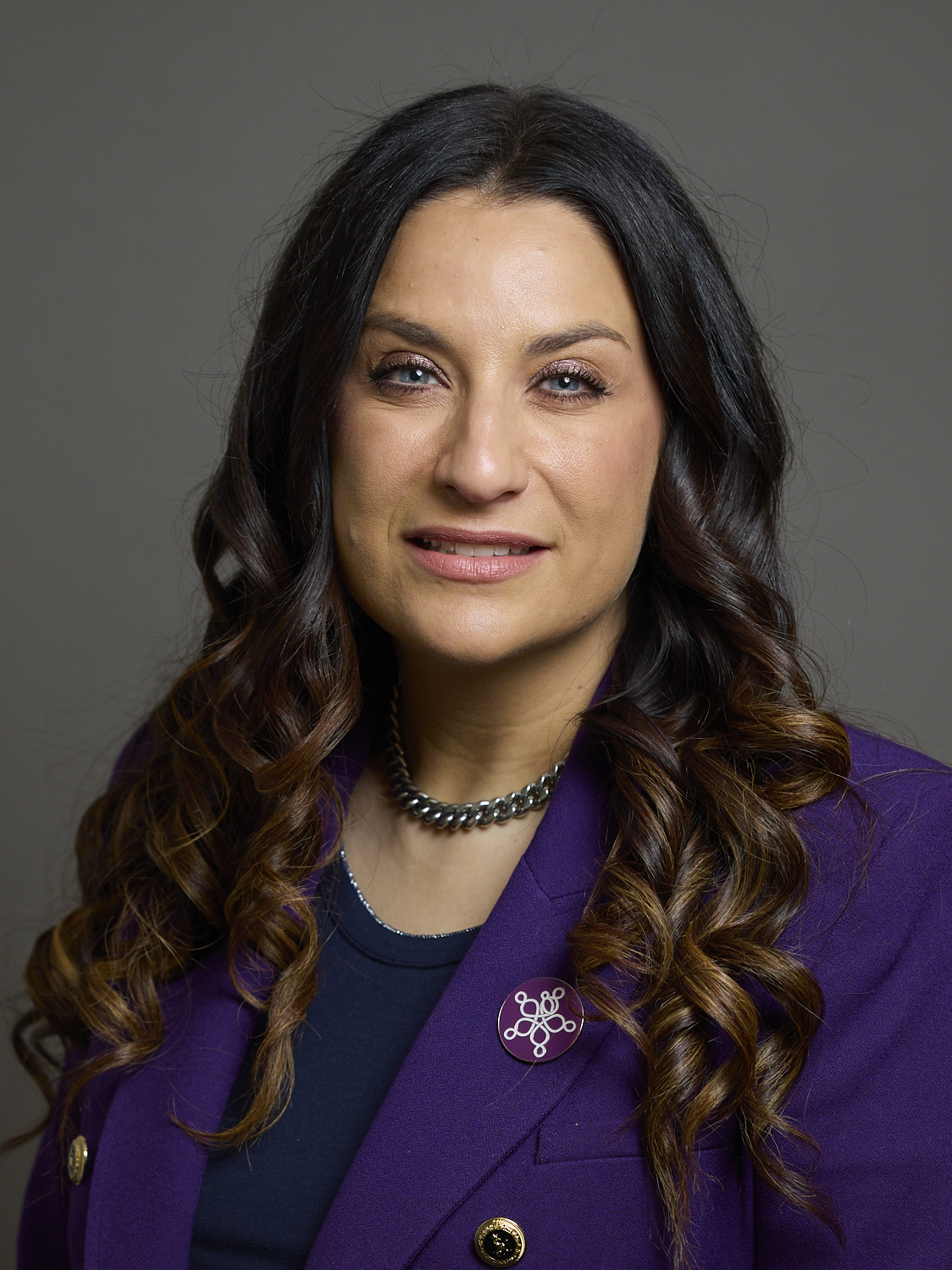
- Official portrait, 2025

Member of Parliament for Liverpool Wavertree
- In office 6 May 2010 – 6 November 2019
- Preceded by: Jane Kennedy
- Succeeded by: Paula Barker
Shadow portfolios
2015–2016	Mental Health (Note: Attending shadow cabinet)
2013–2015	Public Health
2010–2013	Climate Change

Member of the House of Lords
- Lord Temporal
- Life peerage 6 February 2025

Personal details
- Born: Luciana Clare Berger; 13 May 1981 (age 45) London, England
- Party: Labour Co-op (before 2019, 2023–present)
- Other political affiliations: Parliamentary affiliation: The Independents (2019); Party membership: Independent (2019); Change UK (2019); Liberal Democrats (2019–2023)
- Spouse: Alistair Goldsmith (m. 2015)
- Relatives: Manny Shinwell (great-uncle)
- Education: University of Birmingham (BA); Birkbeck, University of London (MSc)
- Other offices: October–December 2019: Liberal Democrat Spokesperson for Health, Wellbeing and Social Care; March–June 2019: Change UK Spokesperson for Home Affairs, Health, Digital and Culture

Luciana Clare Berger, Baroness Berger (/ˈbɜːrdʒər/; born 13 May 1981) is a British politician who served as Member of Parliament for Liverpool Wavertree from 2010 to 2019, and a Member of the House of Lords since 2025. A member of the Labour and Co-operative parties, she was a founding member of The Independent Group, later Change UK, before joining the Liberal Democrats; Berger rejoined Labour in 2023.

Born in London, Berger attained degrees at the University of Birmingham and Birkbeck, University of London. She served as a National Executive Committee member of the National Union of Students, but resigned to protest against what she considered the committee's apathy towards antisemitism. Berger also joined Labour and served as director of Labour Friends of Israel. Selected as Labour candidate for Liverpool Wavertree—her selection attracted criticism for its centrally imposed all-women shortlist—she was then elected to Parliament in the 2010 general election.

As an MP, Berger joined the Official Opposition frontbench under Ed Miliband's Labour leadership; first as Shadow Minister for Climate Change from 2010 to 2013 and later as Shadow Minister for Public Health from 2013 to 2015. As a backbencher, she campaigned against dangerous dogs and their owners, food poverty and loopholes allowing companies to avoid their health and safety responsibilities. She was re-elected in the 2015 and 2017 general elections.

Following Jeremy Corbyn's election as Labour leader in September 2015, Berger was appointed to the Shadow Cabinet as the first Shadow Minister for Mental Health. However, she was critical of Corbyn and resigned in June 2016. In February 2019, members of her local party briefly proposed motions of no confidence in her for "continually" criticising Corbyn. Later that month, she joined other former Labour and Conservative MPs in forming Change UK, but left this group in June 2019 to sit as an Independent MP, before joining the Liberal Democrats in September 2019. She stood unsuccessfully for Finchley and Golders Green in the 2019 general election. In February 2023, Berger rejoined the Labour Party. Keir Starmer tweeted that he was delighted that she accepted his invitation to rejoin the party.

== Early life ==
Berger was born in London and raised in Wembley, north-west London. She is a great-niece of trade union official and Labour MP Manny Shinwell, who rose to be a Minister in the Ramsay MacDonald government and in the Attlee government, as Secretary of State for War in the latter.

Her father, Howard, is an ex-solicitor who runs a home-furnishings shop. Her mother, Antonia, is an interior designer and children's book writer. According to Berger, her family was more culturally Jewish than religiously so. She said of her Jewish heritage: "I went to the synagogue a lot, and I was part of a strong community. One of its values, ‘Tikkun olam’, literally means 'repairing the world', and it instilled strong values in me at quite young age." She has described that throughout her upbringing the Labour Party was "part of [her] DNA," and her "family's heritage."

== Education ==
Berger was educated at Haberdashers' School for Girls, a private school in Elstree, Hertfordshire. Berger subsequently gained a degree in commerce with Spanish from the University of Birmingham in 2004. She was named the University of Birmingham 2012 Alumna of the Year. She spent a year studying at ICADE in Madrid, Spain. Berger then completed a master's degree (MSc) on a part-time basis in government, politics and policy at Birkbeck, University of London.

Berger was a National Executive Committee member of the National Union of Students, Britain's main student representative organisation, serving as an elected member for two years. She co-convened the NUS Anti-Racism/Anti-Fascism Campaign.

In April 2005, Berger resigned from the committee along with two other committee members, saying "While I accuse no one of antisemitism, this year NUS has been a bystander to Jew-hatred". A later independent inquiry later cleared the NUS of failing to tackle antisemitism, but criticised the union for not having rigorous complaints procedures in place, and for "lack of proactive response to allegations of anti-semitism". The report recommended that the union apologise. The report was also critical of Berger, for—following complaints from Jewish students that the union was tolerating antisemitism—attending a meeting with the head of the School of Oriental and African Studies, inasmuch as the report suggested that given that she was a national executive member Berger should not have attended the meeting (which it said was implicitly critical of the union), and instead should have sought to support the union in addressing the problem first.

== Early career ==
Berger began her career with the management consultant Accenture in its government strategy Unit from 2005 to 2006, advising the UK Treasury and other parts of the UK government as to how to be more effective and efficient. She then worked for the National Health Service (NHS) Confederation as government and parliamentary manager, campaigning for the NHS within the government from 2006 to 2007. She also ran a non-profit campaigning and education organisation working with democratic socialists and trade unions for peace and security in the Middle East.

Berger was the director of Labour Friends of Israel from 2007 to 2010, and stepped down before the 2010 general election to stand in Liverpool. She was a committee member of the London Jewish Forum, an organisation dedicated to the promotion of Jewish life in London, and stepped down when she was elected to parliament in 2010.

== Parliamentary career ==
=== Selection as parliamentary candidate ===
Berger was selected as prospective parliamentary candidate (PPC) in early 2010 by the Liverpool Wavertree party. There was criticism of the Labour National Executive Committee's imposition of an all-women shortlist (AWS) on the local party, and the Labour leadership was accused of parachuting Berger in as a candidate.

During the selection process, Berger lived for a month at the home of Jane Kennedy, then the sitting Labour MP, whose partner was Labour official Peter Dowling, who ran the selection process. The completed ballot papers were returned to Kennedy's home address. Kennedy said that she and Dowling had acted properly. Berger beat her nearest rival by a ratio of two votes to one.

=== Backbencher ===
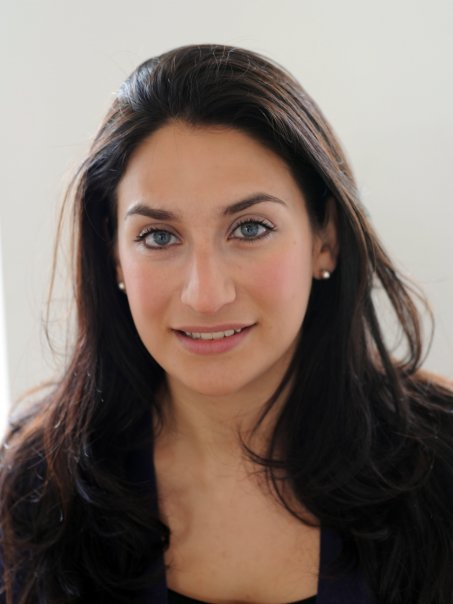
Berger in 2011

Berger was elected at the 2010 general election with 53.1% of the vote.

Beginning in 2010, she campaigned against dangerous dogs and their owners. Reacting to the killings of a number of children by dangerous dogs and the attacks leading to injuries of 5,000 postmen and women a year, she proposed allowing police to take action on private property, produce dog control notices, and instigate compulsory micro-chipping, so that dogs and their owners can be traced more easily.

On 31 October 2010, Berger appeared in a BBC Radio 5 Live show which also featured among others Kelvin MacKenzie, the former editor of The Sun. MacKenzie was editor at the time when the paper's coverage of the Hillsborough disaster led to vilification of MacKenzie. Berger responded to criticism on her Twitter feed, writing: "Was there for the MP bit with Amber Rudd, wasn't told before who the other guests were".

In March 2011, Berger launched a campaign to Save BBC Radio Merseyside, in response to proposals by the BBC to consider reducing locally produced content on their local radio network to cover only the breakfast and drivetime periods and syndicating Five Live during the daytime.

Berger was a member of Labour Friends of Israel. In September 2011, The Jewish Chronicle reported she had been criticised by the Jewish community in Liverpool and supporters of Israel for not using her position to defend Israel, and asserted that the reason was for the sake of career advancement. After 16 months in parliament, she had not mentioned Israel in any of her parliamentary interventions.

Berger spoke in support of allowing MPs to tweet in the House of Commons, during a debate on 13 October 2011. She said moves to effectively ban the use of Twitter were "anti-democratic, regressive and bemusing to the public," and that "It's a very useful way to connect with communities we were elected to serve."

Berger campaigned against food poverty, which she described as a "national scandal". In 2012, she produced and directed a film, Breadline Britain, dealing with food poverty. She was the first MP to secure a parliamentary debate on food banks, and brought the issue back to parliament more than 16 times.

Berger raised the issue in 2012, and subsequently raised the issue of loopholes allowing companies to avoid their health and safety responsibilities. She argued that parliament has a responsibility to close those loopholes.

In 2015, Berger applied for selection as Labour Party candidate for the position of Metro Mayor of the Liverpool City Region, but on 10 August 2016 failed to be selected. She was the only woman campaigning to be a Labour candidate for the newly created metro mayor position.

Soon after her election victory in 2010, Berger was elected to the Business, Innovation and Skills Committee and the Finance and Services Committee, but left the roles when she was appointed a junior shadow minister in October of that year. Returning to the backbenches in 2016, she served on the House of Commons' Health Committee, later the Health and Social Care Committee, from October 2016 to May 2017 and from September 2017 to November 2019.

=== Antisemitic abuse ===
Berger described receiving a 'torrent of anti-Semitic abuse' beginning from her selection as prospective parliamentary candidate and election as an MP.

In January 2013, Merseyside music promoter Philip Hayes was convicted of a racially aggravated public order offence and fined £120 after making a series of antisemitic remarks about Jews to Berger at the Liverpool Music Awards.

In October 2014, Garron Helm, a member of the neo-Nazi National Action youth group, was imprisoned for four weeks after he sent an antisemitic tweet to Berger in August 2014. He served two weeks before being released. Following the conviction, it was reported similar messages to her were being posted on Twitter. According to Berger in December 2014, "[a]t the height of the abuse, the police said I was the subject of 2,500 hate messages in the space of three days" using the same hashtag. She had to take security measures where she lived in Liverpool, and also at her London home. She has accused Twitter of insufficient action to counter the problem. In her view, the site "could start by proactively banning racist words which aren't allowed to be printed in newspapers or broadcast on TV that could never be used in a positive way".

During the 2015 general election campaign, UK Independence Party prospective parliamentary candidate for West Lancashire, Jack Sen tweeted at Berger, "Protect child benefits? If you had it your way you'd send the £ to Poland/Israel". UKIP suspended Sen from the party for the antisemitic tweet to Berger, as well as other similar comments.

Joshua Bonehill-Paine, a supporter of the aforementioned Garron Helm and a self-described far-right antisemite, was convicted of racially aggravated harassment of Berger in December 2016. He was sentenced to two years in prison.

In February 2017, John Nimmo was sentenced to 27 months in prison after pleading guilty to nine charges, including sending Berger death threats and antisemitic messages signed "your friend the Nazi".

After Berger asked Jeremy Corbyn's office in March 2018 why in 2012 he had queried the removal by a local council of an allegedly antisemitic mural by Mear One, she received further online abuse which she stated came from left-wing individuals. She has noted the "volume and toxicity of stuff that come[s] from the left for daring to speak out, for daring to address this" and that "people believe there is a place for anti-Semitism on the left". She also noted the antisemitic abuse she had received from Twitter accounts with the hashtag 'JC4PM', a hashtag promoting support for Jeremy Corbyn in his prime ministerial campaign.

In July 2018, Jack Coulson, a teenager obsessed with neo-Nazism and who allegedly had told an acquaintance that he was going to kill Berger, was jailed for eight-and-a-half months for possessing a document for terrorist purposes. He had a past conviction for making a pipe bomb.

=== Shadow Climate Change Minister and Shadow Health Minister ===
As Shadow Minister for Climate Change for three years, Berger was critical of the Conservative government's actions on the environmental agenda. She focused in particular on the Green Investment Bank and the Green Deal, writing in the environment section of The Guardian about the need for a pro-environmental-business agenda. In the run-up to the 2011 budget, Berger also contributed an article to the Labour blog Left Foot Forward, challenging the Chancellor of the Exchequer to meet "three Climate Change tests" in order for the government to reach the Prime Minister's aim of being the "Greenest Government ever".

In June 2011, Berger secured an amendment to the Energy Bill, the Green Deal apprenticeship programme. The amendment states that the Secretary of State would report to parliament on proposals for an apprenticeships scheme within the Green Deal. She later criticised the Green Deal, saying in The Independent: "Because of sky-high interest rates, hidden charges and penalty payments, the reality for most people will be that the Green Deal ends up costing them more than they save".

On 8 October 2013, Berger was appointed Shadow Minister for Public Health following a frontbench reshuffle. She had previously signed parliamentary motions in support of NHS funding for homeopathy. A Labour Party spokesman said: "Luciana fully supports the scientific evidence on the use of homeopathy. These old petitions will have no impact on her work as a shadow Health minister".

In the 2015 general election, Berger was returned with an increased majority of 69.3%. Following the election of Jeremy Corbyn as Labour Party Leader in September 2015, Berger was appointed to the Shadow Cabinet as the newly established Shadow Minister for Mental Health. The position did not have an identical counterpart in the then-current Conservative government. She resigned from the post on 27 June 2016 in the mass resignation of shadow ministers from the Labour frontbench over concerns about Corbyn's leadership.

=== Re-election in 2017 and no confidence motions ===
In the 2017 general election, Berger was returned with an increased majority of 79.6%. Following the election, she was appointed parliamentary chair of the Jewish Labour Movement, a post she held until leaving the parliamentary party in February 2019.

On 7 February 2019, Berger's Liverpool Wavertree constituency announced that two motions of no confidence in her had been submitted by local members, both condemning her for "continually" criticising the Labour Party leader. Both motions were withdrawn. While both motions referred to Berger's attacks on the party leadership, John McDonnell suggested that speculation that Berger was considering co-founding a breakaway party was a factor. Louise Ellman, another Liverpool Jewish Labour MP, claimed that the motive had been antisemitic. Labour's deputy leader, Tom Watson, defended Berger in the Commons, saying she had "our solidarity, our support, as she battles the bullying and hatred from members of her own local party. They bring disgrace to the party I love." Former Labour Prime Minister Tony Blair called Berger's treatment "shameful", and said: "The fact that someone like Luciana Berger – who is a smart, capable, active member of parliament doing her best for her constituents – the fact that she should even be subject to a no-confidence motion with this type of allegation swirling around is shameful for the Labour party."

=== The Independent Group and The Independents ===
On 18 February 2019, Berger and six other MPs – Chuka Umunna, Chris Leslie, Angela Smith, Mike Gapes, Gavin Shuker and Ann Coffey – resigned from the Labour Party in protest at Jeremy Corbyn's leadership to form The Independent Group, later Change UK. In Berger's resignation speech, she described the Labour Party as being "institutionally anti-Semitic" and said she was "ashamed to remain in the Labour Party". The group cited disagreements over the handling of Brexit and antisemitism within the party as reasons for leaving. They subsequently gained four additional members, bringing their ranks to eleven in total: adding Labour's Joan Ryan but also the Conservatives' Anna Soubry, Heidi Allen and Sarah Wollaston.

In June 2019, she left Change UK to sit as an independent MP. In July 2019, Berger was a founding member of a grouping of MPs called The Independents.

=== Liberal Democrats ===
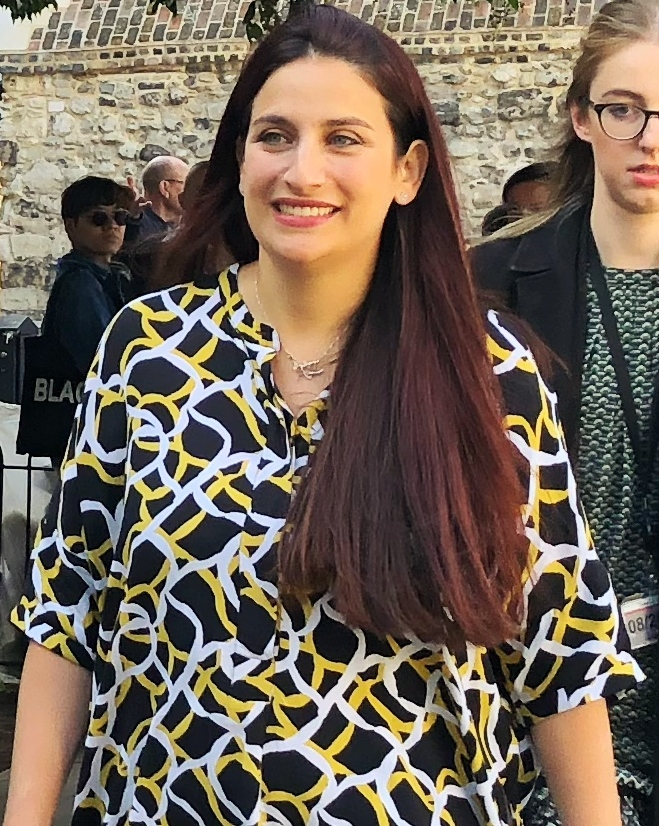
Berger following press conference announcing her membership of the Liberal Democrats

In July 2019, a spokesman for Berger said she had "no intention" of joining the Liberal Democrats. However, just two months later, she joined the Liberal Democrats and cited their anti-Brexit platform as her primary reason for doing so. In December of that year, she said the antisemitism complaints which had prompted her to leave the Labour Party were still unresolved within the party. When Jo Swinson was elected new Liberal Democrat leader in 2019, Berger was appointed the party's spokesperson for health, wellbeing and social care.

Berger was selected as the Liberal Democrat candidate for the Greater London constituency of Finchley and Golders Green at the 2019 general election. She made the decision to stand in the constituency because of its high Jewish population and the high proportion of its electorate who had voted to remain in the EU; she also claimed she had more of an affinity towards living in London and she would be raising her children there, rather than in Liverpool. She received 31.9% of the votes cast and finished second to the Conservative candidate Mike Freer, who received 43.8% and consequently won with a majority of 11.9%.

== Post-political career ==
On 1 July 2020, Berger became managing director of Advocacy and Public Affairs at public relations company Edelman UK, specialising in health, food and drink, climate change and energy policy.

In an interview for Jewish News in June 2021, Berger shared that she had "absolutely no regrets" in her decision to leave the Labour Party, and hinted at a possible future return to frontline politics.

On 10 October 2022, Berger was appointed as the CEO of iNHouse, a PR and lobbying firm based in Westminster.

In February 2023, Berger rejoined the Labour Party. Keir Starmer tweeted that he was delighted that she accepted his invitation to rejoin the party.

In December 2024, it was announced that Berger would be made a Life Peer as part of the 2024 Political Peerages. She was created Baroness Berger, of Barnhill in the London Borough of Brent on 6 February 2025.

== Personal life and awards ==
Berger married Liverpool music manager Alistair Goldsmith at the city's Princes Road Synagogue in June 2015. The couple's first child, a daughter, Amelie, was born in March 2017 and their second child, a son, Zion, in March 2019. She observes the main Jewish holidays.

As a student activist and new Labour MP, Berger was romantically linked to Tony Blair's son Euan and with Chuka Umunna, later also a member of Labour, Change UK and the Liberal Democrats. She denied that she had been involved in a relationship with Blair, but confirmed that she was once romantically involved with Umunna. She was the girlfriend of ex-Labour MP and MEP Siôn Simon in 2010.

Berger was shortlisted for the Grassroot Diplomat Initiative Award in 2015 for her campaign against food poverty, in which she had produced a film to highlight the growing concerns of some of her constituents reliant on food banks.

Berger became a vice president of the Jewish Leadership Council in June 2019.

== Notes ==
Parliament of the United Kingdom
Preceded by Jane Kennedy	Member of Parliament for Liverpool Wavertree; 2010–2019	Succeeded by Paula Barker
Political offices
Preceded by Emily Thornberry	Shadow Minister for Climate Change; 2010–2013	Succeeded by Julie Elliott
Preceded by Diane Abbott	Shadow Minister for Public Health; 2013–2015	Succeeded by Andrew Gwynne
New office	Shadow Minister for Mental Health; 2015–2016	Succeeded by Barbara Keeley
Party political offices
Preceded by Vince Cable	Liberal Democrat Spokesperson for Health, Wellbeing and Social Care; 2019	Succeeded by Munira Wilson
