= Sir William Cain, 1st Baronet =

English brewer and philanthropist

Sir William Cain Bt JP
- Born: William Ernest Cain; 7 May 1864
- Died: 5 May 1924 (aged 59)
- Occupations: Brewer, philanthropist

Sir William Ernest Cain, 1st Baronet, JP (7 May 1864 – 5 May 1924) was an English brewer and philanthropist.

Cain was the son of Robert Cain, who had founded a large brewing empire, Robert Cain & Sons Ltd. He was educated at Winwick Priory. The family firm was taken over as joint managing directors by William Cain and his brother, Charles Nall-Cain, who continued to develop the business.

During the First World War, Cain donated his old home, Wilton Manor at West Kirby, to the government as a convalescent hospital for officers and paid for its conversion and equipment. He also donated money to many other war charities. For these services, he was knighted in 1917 and created a baronet in the 1920 New Year Honours.

Cain married Florence Roberts in 1886. They had a son and a daughter. He died in 1924 at the age of 59 and was succeeded in the baronetcy by his only son, Ernest.

== Footnotes ==
Baronetage of the United Kingdom
New creation	Baronet (of Wargrave); 1920–1924	Succeeded by Ernest Cain
