= Trench nephritis =

- Other names: Trench kidney
- Specialty: Nephrology; Military medicine
- Symptoms: Albuminuria, high blood pressure, swelling, casts in urine, difficulty breathing and bronchitis.
- Risk factors: Trench warfare
- Prognosis: Low mortality, long recovery, frequent relapses

Trench nephritis, also known as war nephritis, is a kidney infection, first recognised by medical officers as a new disease during the early part of the First World War and distinguished from the then-understood acute nephritis by also having bronchitis and frequent relapses. Trench nephritis was the major kidney problem of the war. The cause was not established at the time, treatments were ineffective, and the condition led to 35,000 British and 2,000 American casualties.

The term trench nephritis was coined by Nathan Raw and was first reported in the British Medical Journal in 1915 as affecting soldiers of the British Expeditionary Force in Flanders. Soldiers presented with sudden-onset albuminuria, casts in urine, high blood pressure, swelling of legs or face, headache, sore throat and difficulty breathing and bronchitis. Pathology suggested an underlying inflammation of the small blood vessels of the kidneys.

Later evidence showed that trench nephritis may have been due to hantavirus, carried by rodents.

== Background ==
Before the First World War, kidney diseases had been described in medical textbooks by physicians including Sir William Osler in 1909 and Marcus Seymour Pembrey in 1913. In November 1914, in the early months of the First World War, there were four million men living in 4,000 miles (6,400 km) of trenches, with which three diseases came to be closely associated: trench fever, trench foot, and trench nephritis.

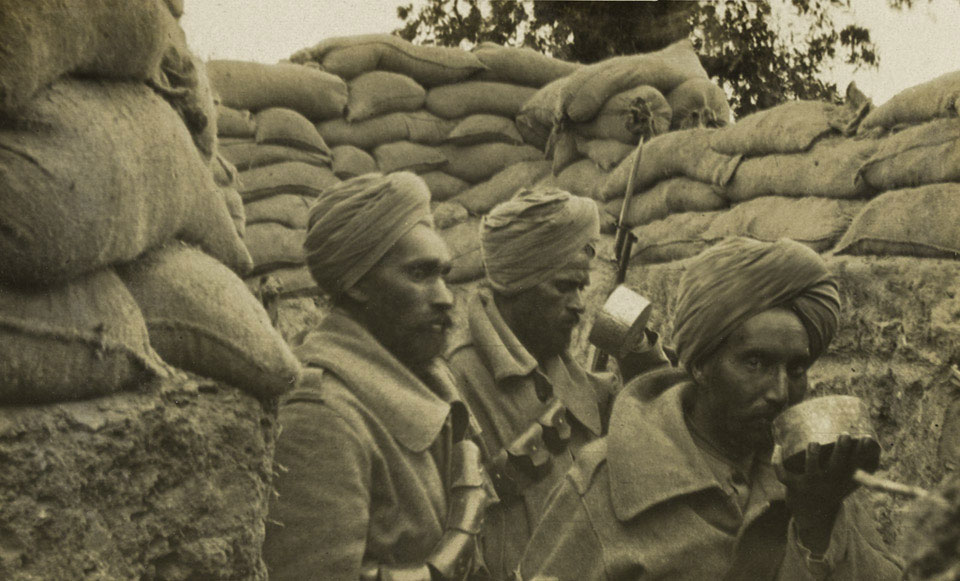
Indian soldiers in trenches, Gallipoli (1915)

British soldier in trenches, Somme (1916)

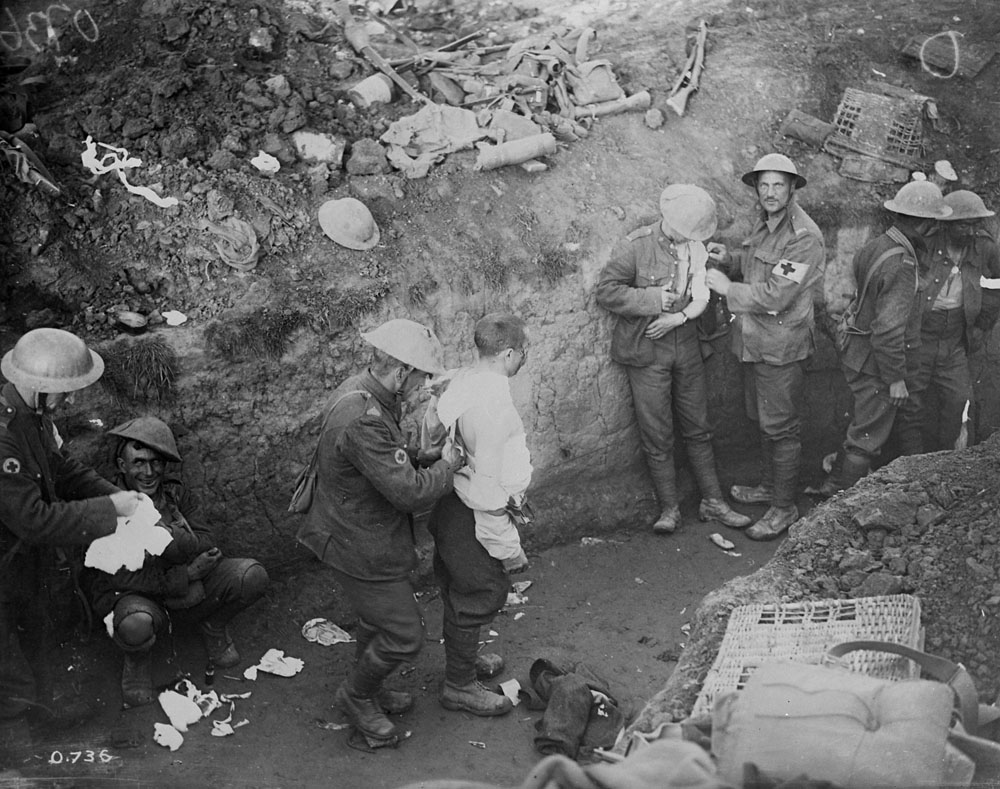
Canadian soldiers in trenches, Somme (1916)

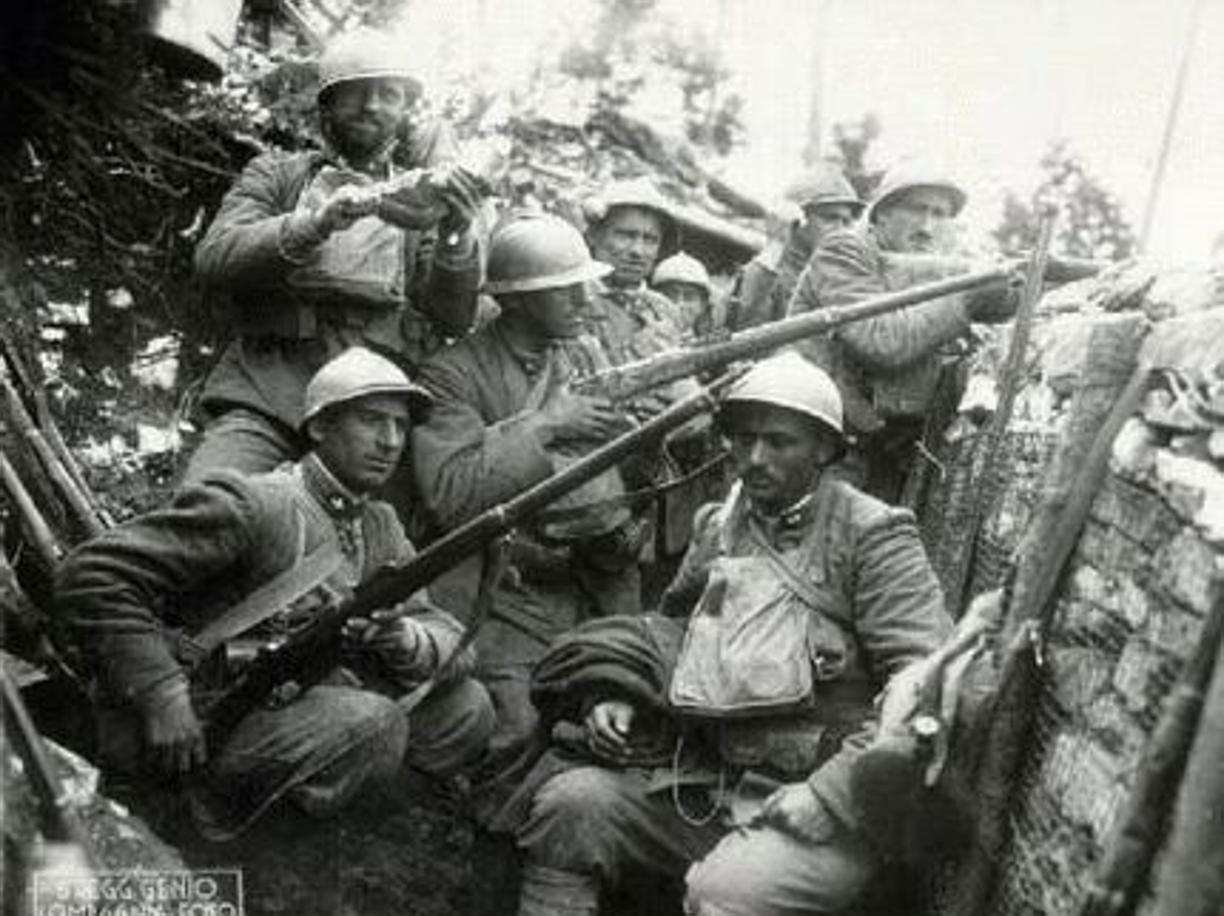
Italian soldiers in trenches (1918)

== First World War ==
Trench nephritis, a term coined by Nathan Raw, was first reported in soldiers of the British Expeditionary Force in Flanders in the British Medical Journal (BMJ) in 1915. The article included a list of possible causes, including influenza, metal poisoning, toxins as a result of constipation, or a type of beriberi. There was a wide spectrum of opinion on the origin of the condition. Some believed it was a result of scarlet fever. Thomas Oliver wrote authoritatively in the BMJ that exposure was a cause. The Germans had reported that the disease occurred in a particular division of their army among those soldiers who slept on pavement rather than those who slept on wooden boards. Thereafter, the Medical Research Council began to investigate the new disease at St Bartholomew's Hospital, and the findings were discussed during the Royal Society of Medicine meeting in February 1916, with Osler as one of the four key speakers. At the time, consensus held with some uncertainty that the then understood acute nephritis was due to toxins, not infection. That this was not the case with the newly found nephritis was debated in several medical journals. Further clarity on an infectious cause was clouded by the finding that some cases did occur in men who had not been in the trenches, urine and blood cultures did not show any infection, and the disease did not appear to spread to areas near the trenches.

Affected soldiers presented with sudden onset of albuminuria, high blood pressure, swelling of legs or face, headache, sore throat and difficulty breathing and bronchitis. Casts were seen in the urine. It was distinguished from acute nephritis by its prolonged course and subsequent frequent relapses. Pathology revealed narrowing of small blood vessels in the kidneys, capillary thrombi, and a proliferation of cells affecting the capillary lumen, suggesting an underlying inflammation of blood vessels.

The cause was not established during the war and therefore preventative measures were not implemented. Trench nephritis was ineffectively treated in the same way that acute nephritis had been treated before the war. Research into the condition was stopped in 1918.

== Epidemiology ==
Along with other trench diseases including trench foot and trench fever, trench nephritis contributed to 25% of the British Expeditionary Force's triage bed occupancy and was the major kidney problem of the First World War. The condition led to 35,000 British and 2,000 American casualties, with deaths numbering in the hundreds. The mortality rate of the condition was low, and men took a long time to recover.

== Significance ==
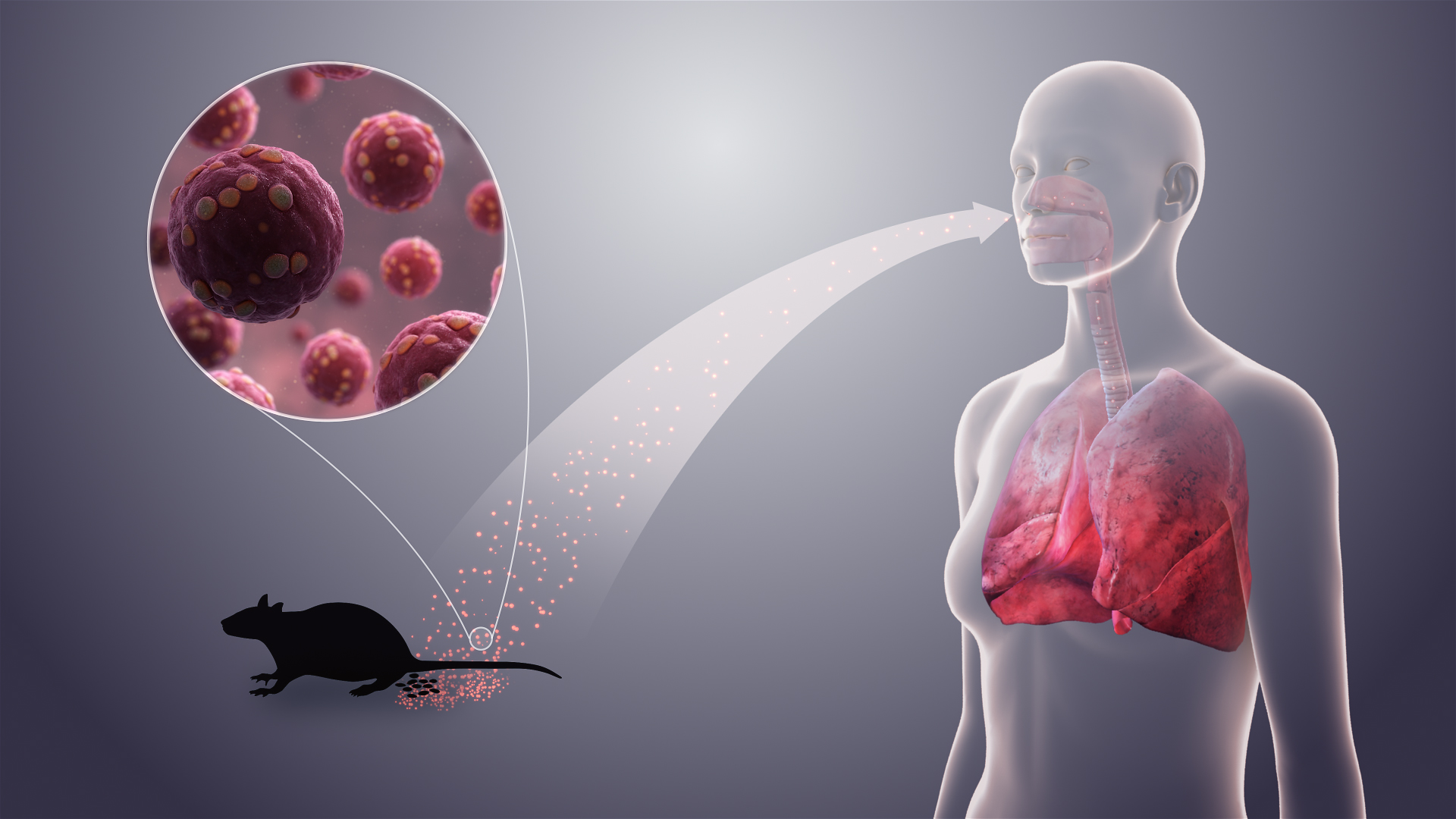
Hantavirus transmission

Trench warfare was significant in subsequent wars including the Second World War, the Falklands War and the Gulf War. Of the trench diseases, trench foot made a reappearance in the British Army during the Falklands War in 1982. Trench fever has also been detected during peacetime in homeless alcoholic people and people with HIV. There has since been evidence that a rise in kidney disease during the American Civil War and the occurrence of First World War trench nephritis may have been due to the rodent-spread hantavirus. A similar kidney disease was reported in epidemic proportions in 1934 in Sweden.

== Bibliography ==
- Atenstaedt, Robert (2011). The Medical Response to the Trench Diseases in World War One. Cambridge Scholars Publishing. ISBN 978-1-4438-3063-8.
