= Land raid =

Form of political protest in Scotland

A land raid was a form of political protest in rural Scotland, primarily in the Highlands.

== History ==
A land raid was a form of political protest in rural Scotland, primarily in the Highlands. Land raiders threatened to seize, or seized, land which they claimed had been unfairly taken from them or their forebears. Landowners, and the law, regarded the protests as a form of squatting. Land raids were particularly common in the Hebrides, but some of the most prominent cases occurred on the mainland, for example in Wester Ross and in Sutherland. Examples include Coll, Lewis (1888) and the Raasay Raiders (1921).

In 1906, landless men from the island of Barra crossed to Vatersay. The latter was a fertile island run as a single farm but its owner Lady Emily Gordon Cathcart had only visited once in 54 years. After the cottars refused to leave, Cathcart took ten of them to court in 1908. The judge said the owner had neglected her duties, but still sentenced the men to two months in prison. In 1909, the Congested Districts Board bought the island and broke it up into 58 crofts.

The Seven Men of Knoydart were returning servicemen who made an unsuccessful raid on land belonging to Nazi sympathiser Lord Brocket in 1948.

== See also ==
- Land reform in Scotland
