= Seven Men of Knoydart =

Group of land raiders

The Seven Men of Knoydart was the name given, by the press in 1948, to a group of land raiders who tried to appropriate land at Knoydart in Scotland. The name evoked the memory of the Seven Men of Moidart, the seven Jacobites who accompanied the Young Pretender on his voyage to Scotland in 1745. The land owner Lord Brocket succeeded in evicting the men despite widespread support. It was the last land raid in Scotland.

== Land raid ==
At the end of the 18th-century, a population of around 1,000 eked out a living on the Knoydart peninsula, through a mixture of crofting and fishing. By 1948, Knoydart was owned by Lord Brocket, who was controversial for his fascist activities before and during World War II. He was known as a Nazi sympathiser, and became a committed member of the Anglo-German Fellowship, using his estates to entertain supporters of Nazi Germany.

On 9 November, the seven men, Henry MacAskill, Archie MacDonald, Archie MacDougall, Jack MacHardy, Duncan McPhail, Sandy Macphee and William Quinnall, with assistance from Father Colin Macpherson, made the land raid invoking the Land Settlement Act, which permitted returning servicemen to take over land which was under-used and farm it as their own. As veterans of the Second World War, they had been fighting to defend Britain against the fascist regimes in Germany and elsewhere. The seven men marked out 65 acres (26 hectares) of arable land and 10,000 acres (4,000 hectares) of hill land upon which to settle.

The raid followed a pattern set by the Highland Land League some seventy years before, and was inspired by similar land raids at the end of the Great War, on Raasay and the Long Isle, when returning soldiers drew public attention to the misuse and mismanagement of land.

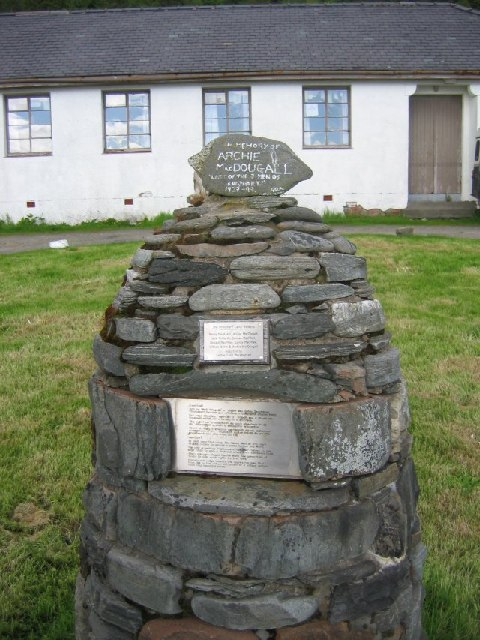
Seven Men of Knoydart memorial cairn

Although the raiders had public opinion on their side, Lord Brocket succeeded in obtaining a court order to remove them. The case was heard and rejected by a Court of Enquiry called by the government early in 1949. An appeal by the men to the Secretary of State for Scotland also failed. It was the last land raid in Scotland.

A cairn commemorating the land raid was erected at Inverie in 1991, by the Knoydart Land Raid Commemoration Committee. The plaque reads:

Justice!
In 1948 near this cairn the Seven Men of Knoydart staked claims to secure a place to live and work.
For over a century Highlanders had been forced to use land raids to gain a foothold where their forebears lived. Their struggle should inspire each new generation of Scots to gain such rights by just laws.
History will judge harshly the oppressive laws that have led to the virtual extinction of a unique culture from this beautiful place.

== Legacy ==
In 1984 Philip Rhodes, a Surrey property dealer, acquired the estate. He began selling off sections, bringing an end to the reign of absentee landlords in Knoydart. The last 17,000 acres (6,900 hectares) were bought by the jute manufacturing company Titaghur, and when the company went into receivership the land was acquired by the Knoydart Foundation in a community buyout.
