= Ivy Lilian McClelland =

Ivy McClelland
- Born: 18 May 1908; Liverpool, England
- Died: 2 April 2006 (aged 97)
- Employer: University of Glasgow

Ivy Lilian McClelland (18 May 1908 – 2 April 2006) was a British Hispanist at the University of Glasgow.

== Life ==
McClelland was born in Liverpool, England in 1908. She was appointed in 1930 as an assistant lecturer in Spanish at the University of Glasgow. During the second world war she led the Spanish department at the university as Professor William Atkinson was working for the Foreign Office in Oxford. In 1970 she published "Spanish Drama of Pathos: 1750-1808. High tragedy".

She retired in 1973. In 1981 a lecture was established in her name at her university and in 1989 she was awarded what some thought was a belated doctorate of letters. Geoffrey Ribbans of Liverpool University wrote that he thought that she had been overlooked too long because of her gender.

The ownership of the title Bulletin of Hispanic Studies was a matter of dispute between Glasgow and Liverpool University. As a result the bulletin was very short of funds. McClelland was amongst three white knights who found £30,000 to save the journal.

In 1995 a research chair was also created in her name. In 1997 she was made an honorary professor. This promotion normally lasted for five years but the university extended it to ten years. Geoeffrey Ribbans commented that he thought that her professorship had been delivered 50 years too late.

McClelland outlived her family and never married. She rode horses and wrote amusing nonsense rhymes about animals.

== Works ==
- Antología castellana, Liverpool 1935
- The origins of the romantic movement in Spain. A survey of aesthetic uncertainties in the age of reason, Liverpool 1937, New York 1975
- Tirso de Molina. Studies in dramatic realism, Liverpool 1948
- Benito Jerónimo Feijóo, New York 1969
- Spanish drama of pathos 1750-1808, 2 Bde., Liverpool 1970 (spanisch: Pathos dramático en el teatro español de 1750 a 1808, 2 Bde., Liverpool 1998)
- Ignacio de Luzán, New York 1973
- Diego de Torres Villarroel, Boston 1976
- Benito Jerónimo Feijoo, Obras. Selección, Madrid 1985
- Ideological hesitancy in Spain 1700-1750, Liverpool 1991
