= Baron Brocket =

Barony in the Peerage of the United Kingdom

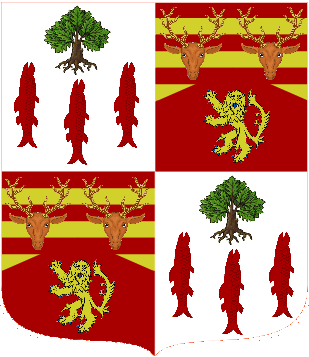
Escutcheon of Baron Brocket

Baron Brocket, of Brocket Hall in the County of Hertford, is a title in the Peerage of the United Kingdom. It was created on 19 January 1933 for the businessman Sir Charles Nall-Cain, 1st Baronet. He was chairman of the brewing firm of Robert Cain & Sons (later Walker Cain Ltd), which had been founded by his father Robert Cain. Before his elevation to the peerage, Nall-Cain had been created a baronet, of the Node, in 1921. His son, the second Baron, represented Wavertree in the House of Commons as a Conservative. As of 2017 the titles are held by the latter's grandson, the third Baron, who succeeded in 1967.

Another member of the family was William Ernest Cain, elder brother of the first Baron Brocket. He was created a baronet, of Wargrave in the County of Berkshire, in 1920. This title became extinct in 1969.

The barons' Latin motto is Felis demulcta mitis (A stroked cat is gentle).

The family seat is Brocket Hall, near Hatfield, Hertfordshire. The family also previously owned Bramshill Park, near Bramshill, Hampshire and Carton House, County Kildare, Ireland.

== Barons Brocket (1933–) ==
- Charles Alexander Nall-Cain, 1st Baron Brocket (1866–1934)
  - Arthur Ronald Nall Nall-Cain, 2nd Baron Brocket (1904–1967)
    - Hon. Ronald Charles Manus Nall-Cain (1928–1961)
      - Charles Ronald George Nall-Cain, 3rd Baron Brocket (1952–)
        - (1) Hon. Alexander Christopher Charles Nall-Cain (1984–)
        - (2) Hon. William Thomas Anthony Nall-Cain (1990–)
      - (3) Hon. Richard Philip Christopher Nall-Cain (1953–)
        - Sam Christopher Nall-Cain (1987–1987)
      - (4) Hon. David Michael Anthony Nall-Cain (1955–)
    - Hon. David Lawrence Robert Nall-Cain (1930–2004)
      - (5) James Alexander Nall-Cain (1961–)
        - (6) Andrew David Bremner Nall-Cain (1995–)

The heir apparent is the present holder's eldest son, the Hon. Alexander Christopher Charles Nall-Cain (born 1984).

The heir apparent's heir presumptive is the present holder's second son, the Hon. William Thomas Anthony Nall-Cain (born 1990).

The daughter of the 3rd Lord Brocket, Hon. Antalya (b.1987), married (27 September 2020) Prince Frederick Alexander of Prussia (b.1984), great-great-grandson of Kaiser Wilhelm II and, of course, descendant of Queen Victoria.

== Arms ==
Coat of arms of Baron Brocket
Notes Granted 29 October 1928 by Sir Nevile Rodwell Wilkinson, Ulster King of Arms. Crest On wreaths of the colours 1st a cat saliant guardant Erminois holding between the paws a dexter hand couped Gules (Cain) 2nd a bee Proper between two roses Gules barbed seeded stalked and leaved Proper (Nall). Escutcheon Quarterly 1st & 4th Argent three salmon haurient Gules in chief an oak tree eradicated Proper (Cain) 2nd & 3rd Argent a bee Proper between three roses Gules (Nall). Supporters Two cats guardant Erminois Motto Felis Demucta Mitis

== See also ==
- Cain baronets, of Wargrave
