= The Colony (Bennachie) =

Former squatter settlement on Bennachie, Scotland

Coordinates: 57.295°N 2.502°W

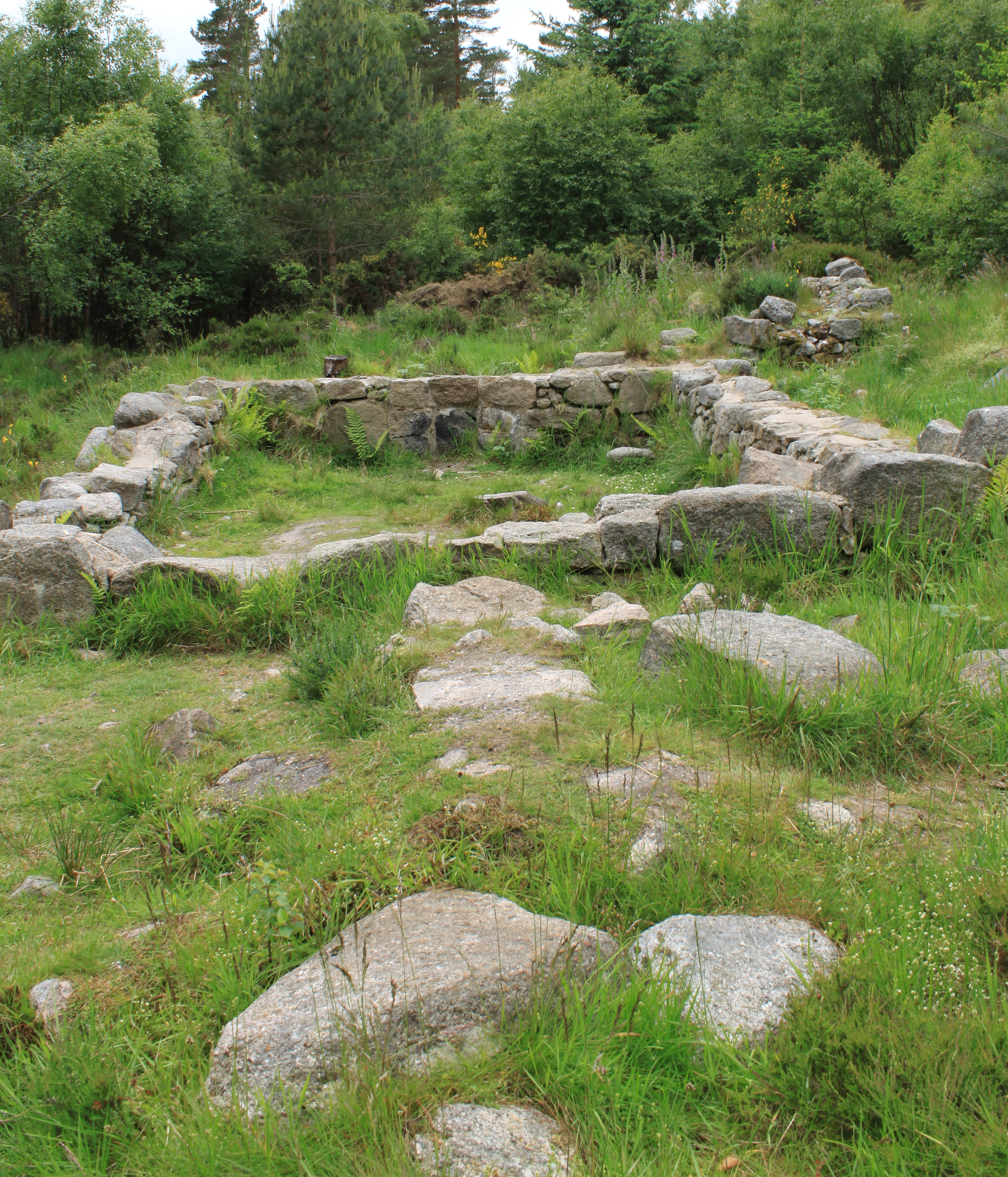
Ruins of Bennachie Colony

The Colony was a squatters' community on commonty, or common land, on one side of Bennachie, a range of hills near Aberdeen, Scotland.

== History ==
From the beginning of the nineteenth century common land in the parishes of Chapel of Garioch and Oyne on the east side of Bennachie became home to a community of squatters. This settlement was known locally as the Colony. Various estimates have been made of when the colony began with some citing 1825 but according to Fagen the first documentary evidence is from 1831. A small number of families led a crofting life supplementing it by doing skilled work, such as dyking, quarrying and knitting.

Two stones were landmarks within the colony: the Boddach Stone and the Gouk Stone. Only the latter remains.

In 1859, eight neighbouring landlords took possession of sections of Bennachie as part of their estates. This action, recognised in law from 5 March 1859, has become known as the Division of the Commonty. As a result, the population on the side of the hill began to decline. Most of the crofts were built on land claimed by Col. Charles Leslie of Balquhain and Fetternear. His son, Charles Stephen Leslie, was responsible for evicting some of the residents in 1878.

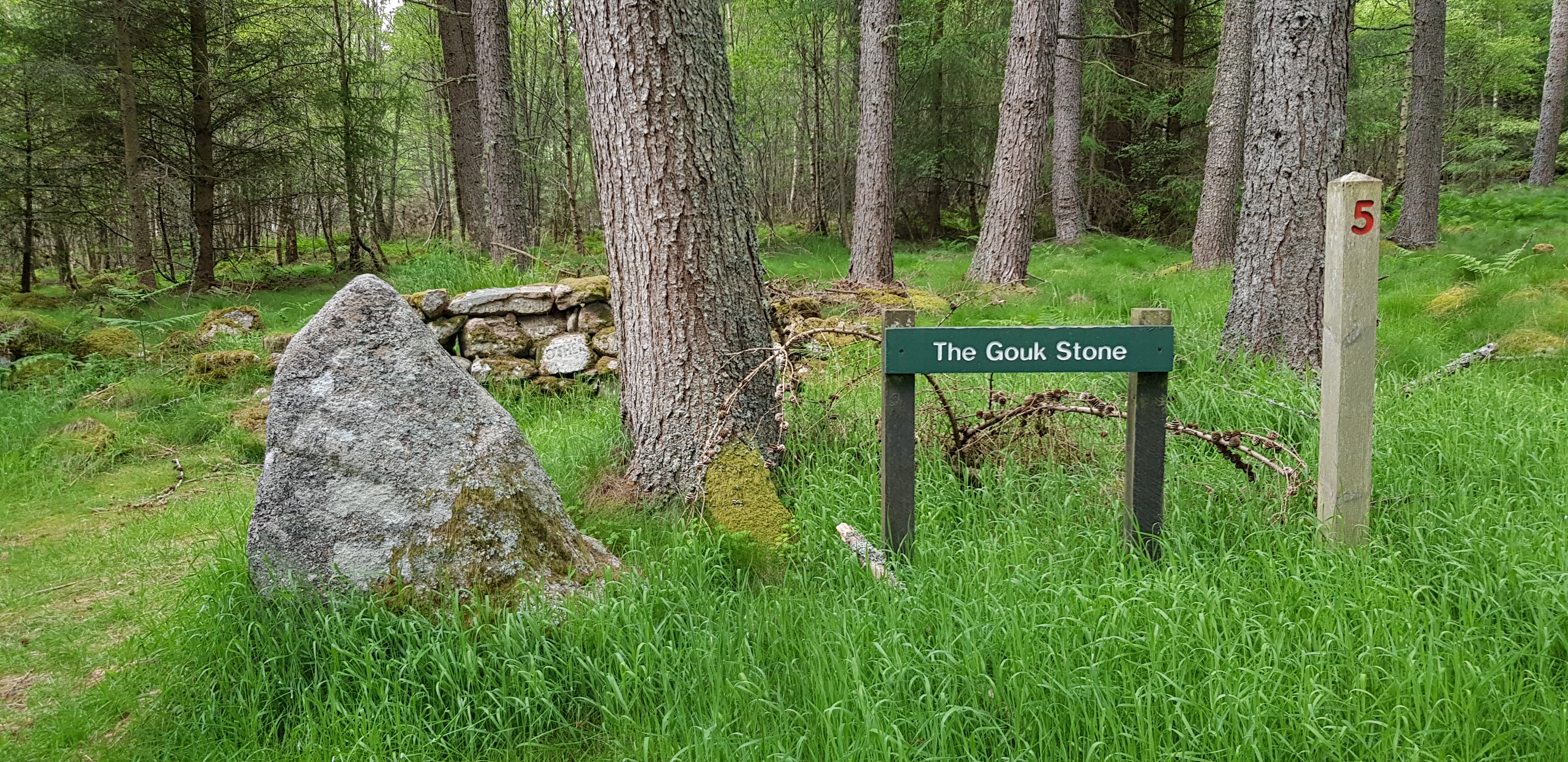
The Gouk Stone, Bennachie

The last of the colonists, George Esson, lived on the hill until his death in May 1939. Esson was a drystone dyker. While working on the Dunecht Estate, repairing old dykes and creating new ones, he would lodge with a Mrs Cooper at Dunecht, then walk the twenty miles back to the colony at weekends.

Visitors to Bennachie can explore the Colony, including the remains of a croft which was excavated as part of the Fetternear Research Project in 1999.

== Demographics ==
The size of the colony varied over time. The following table summarises census data extracted from Fagen's text.

Population of Bennachie Colony 1841-1881
| Year | Houses | Male | Female | Total Population |
|---|---|---|---|---|
| 1841 | 4 | 9 | 10 | 19 |
| 1851 | 10 | 32 | 24 | 56 |
| 1861 | 10 | 21 | 21 | 42 |
| 1871 | 8 | 16 | 18 | 34 |
| 1881 | 1 | 2 | 1 | 3 |
