= Peter Stapleton Shaw =

British Conservative Party politician

Major Peter Stapleton Shaw OBE (6 July 1888 – 3 August 1953) was a British Conservative Party politician.

He was elected to the House of Commons at the general election in 1935, as Member of Parliament (MP) for Liverpool Wavertree. He did not contest the 1945 general election.

Parliament of the United Kingdom
Preceded by Joseph Cleary	Member of Parliament for Liverpool Wavertree; 1935 – 1945	Succeeded by Victor Raikes
