= Charles Nall-Cain, 1st Baron Brocket =

British businessman and philanthropist (1866 – 1934)

Charles Alexander Nall-Cain, 1st Baron Brocket (29 May 1866 – 21 November 1934), born Charles Alexander Cain, was a British businessman and philanthropist.

Brocket was the fourth son of Robert Cain, founder of the brewing firm of Robert Cain & Sons, and his wife Anne, née Newall. The family was originally of Irish descent. He served as chairman of the family firm, which became Walker Cain Ltd after its merger with Walkers of Warrington in 1911. His brother, Sir William Cain, 1st Baronet, was also heavily involved in the business. Apart from his business career Brocket was also a Deputy Lieutenant and High Sheriff of Hertfordshire (1925) and a Justice of the Peace for the county and was involved in charitable causes. He was created a Baronet in the 1921 Birthday Honours for his philanthropic works, and on 19 January 1933 he was raised to the peerage as Baron Brocket, of Brocket Hall in the County of Hertford.

Lord Brocket married, firstly, Florence Nall, daughter of William Nall. In 1921 he assumed by deed poll his wife's maiden surname of Nall in addition to that of Cain. After his first wife's death in 1927 he married, secondly, Anne Page Croft, daughter of Richard Benyon Croft. Lord Brocket died in November 1934, aged 68, and was succeeded in his titles by his son from his first marriage, Ronald Nall-Cain.

Coat of arms of Charles Nall-Cain, 1st Baron Brocket
Notes Granted 29 October 1928 by Sir Nevile Rodwell Wilkinson, Ulster King of Arms. Crest On wreaths of the colours 1st a cat saliant guardant Erminois holding between the paws a dexter hand couped Gules (Cain) 2nd a bee Proper between two roses Gules barbed seeded stalked and leaved Proper (Nall). Escutcheon Quarterly 1st & 4th Argent three salmon haurient Gules in chief an oak tree eradicated Proper (Cain) 2nd & 3rd Argent a bee Proper between three roses Gules (Nall). Supporters Two cats guardant Erminois Motto Felis Demucta Mitis

== Footnotes ==
Peerage of the United Kingdom
New creation	Baron Brocket; 1933–1934	Succeeded by Ronald Nall-Cain
Baronetage of the United Kingdom
New creation	Baronet (of The Node); 1921–1934	Succeeded by Ronald Nall-Cain
