= Liverpool Wavertree =

UK Parliament constituency (1918–1983, 1997 onwards)

- Borough constituency for the House of Commons
- Interactive map of boundaries since 2024
- Location within North West England
- County: Merseyside
- Electorate: 71,067 (March 2020)
- Major settlements: Aigburth, Childwall, Edge Hill, Mossley Hill, Sefton Park, St Michael's, Wavertree

Current constituency
- Created: 1997
- Member of Parliament: Paula Barker (Labour)
- Seats: One
- Created from: Liverpool Broadgreen, Liverpool Mossley Hill

1918–1983
- Seats: One
- Type of constituency: Borough constituency
- Created from: Liverpool East Toxteth and Liverpool Walton
- Replaced by: Liverpool Broadgreen, Liverpool Mossley Hill and Liverpool Garston

Liverpool Wavertree is a borough constituency of the Parliament of the United Kingdom. It was re-established in 1997 and every election since has been won by a Labour Party candidate. It has been represented by Paula Barker since 2019.

An earlier version of the constituency existed between 1918 and 1983, but lay further to the south-east, and was a predominantly Conservative seat.

== Constituency profile ==
Liverpool Wavertree is an urban and suburban constituency in Merseyside. It covers neighbourhoods lying south-east of Liverpool city centre, including Wavertree, Kensington, Edge Hill, Childwall, St Michael's Hamlet, Mossley Hill and Aigburth. Liverpool is a large port city with a history of slave trading and importation of goods for Lancashire's industry. The city underwent economic decline in the 1970s as the docks and manufacturing industries declined in importance, but has experienced regeneration in the 21st century. The Liverpool Wavertree constituency has average levels of wealth; there is high deprivation in the north of the constituency around Wavertree and Kensington, which have dense terraced housing, whilst Childwall and Aigburth are generally affluent. The constituency has a large student population; Kensington and Edge Hill lie adjacent to the University of Liverpool, and Childwall is the location of Liverpool Hope University which has around 5,000 students. The average house price in the constituency is lower than the national average but similar to the rest of North West England.

In general, residents of Liverpool Wavertree are young and well-educated. Few are married and the rate of homeownership is low. Household income is average and a high proportion of residents work in the health, education and finance sectors. The child poverty rate is high, and a high percentage of residents claim unemployment benefits. White people made up 78% of the population at the 2021 census, with Asians being the largest ethnic minority group at 7%. At the local city council, most of the constituency is represented by Liberal Democrats, with some Labour Party councillors elected in the areas closer to the city centre and Green Party representatives elected around St Michael's Hamlet. Voters in Liverpool Wavertree strongly supported remaining in the European Union in the 2016 referendum; an estimated 68% voted to remain compared to the nationwide figure of 48%.

== Boundaries ==
=== Historic ===
1918–1950: The County Borough of Liverpool wards of Allerton, Childwall and Little Woolton, Garston, Much Woolton, Wavertree, and Wavertree West.

1950–1955: The County Borough of Liverpool wards of Old Swan, Wavertree, and Wavertree West.

1955–1983: The County Borough of Liverpool wards of Broadgreen, Childwall, Church, and Old Swan.

1997–2010: The City of Liverpool wards of Broadgreen, Childwall, Church, Kensington, Old Swan, and Picton.

2010–2024: The City of Liverpool wards of Childwall, Church, Kensington and Fairfield, Old Swan, Picton, and Wavertree.

=== Current ===
Further to the 2023 review of Westminster constituencies which came into effect for the 2024 general election, the constituency was defined as being composed of the following wards of the City of Liverpool as they existed on 1 December 2020:

- Childwall; Greenbank; Kensington and Fairfield; Mossley Hill; Picton; St. Michael's; Wavertree.

The constituency was subject to significant change, with addition of the (former) wards of Greenbank, Mossley Hill and St Michael's wards from Liverpool Riverside, partly offset by the transfer of the Church ward to Liverpool Garston and the Old Swan ward to Liverpool West Derby.

Liverpool was subject to a comprehensive local government boundary review which came into effect in May 2023. As a result, the new constituency boundaries do not align with the revised ward boundaries. The constituency now comprises the following wards or part wards of the City of Liverpool from the 2024 general election:

- Aigburth; Arundel; Canning (small part); Childwall (most); Church (most); Edge Hill (nearly all); Everton East (small part); Festival Gardens (part); Gateacre (very small part); Greenbank Park; Kensington & Fairfield (most); Mossley Hill (most); Old Swan West (very small part); Penny Lane (part); Princes Park (small part); Sefton Park; Smithdown; St Michaels; Wavertree Garden Suburbs; Wavertree Village.

The constituency is one of five covering the city of Liverpool, and covers localities such as Wavertree, Broadgreen, Childwall, Edge Hill, Kensington, Fairfield, Mossley Hill, Aigburth and St Michael's Hamlet.

== History ==
The present Liverpool Wavertree constituency dates from 1997. It contained parts of the former constituencies of Liverpool Broadgreen and Liverpool Mossley Hill. It was held by Jane Kennedy of the Labour Party from 1997 to 2010, who was also the former MP for Liverpool Broadgreen. At the 2005 general election, the Labour lead over the Liberal Democrats was cut from 38 points to 15 points. At the 2010 general election, Jane Kennedy retired, and Luciana Berger was selected as the official Labour candidate, which caused some friction in the local CLP, especially due to her close connection with Kennedy.

An earlier Liverpool Wavertree constituency existed until 1983; this was further to the south-east in the city and was predominantly a Conservative seat, occasionally with large majorities. It had been created in 1918, but a declining population in the 1970s caused it to be split between Liverpool Garston, the newly formed Liverpool Broadgreen and Liverpool Mossley Hill constituencies. While the Conservatives have fared badly in the new Wavertree constituency (polling under 7% at the 2005 general election), a direct comparison must take into account the differing boundaries since the 1997 recreation: with more inner-city areas than its previous incarnation, the seat is home to constituents on a lower income than the average in the North West and who are traditionally less sympathetic to Conservative policies. The 2015 general election result made the seat the seventh-safest of Labour's 232 seats by percentage of majority.

At the 2010 general election, the Liberal Democrats' targeting of the seat led to a high turnout; however, it was comfortably retained by Labour with a 2.1% swing away from the Liberal Democrats. The unexpected turnout led, unusually, to one polling station running out of ballot papers.

== Members of Parliament ==
Election	Member	Party
1918	Nathan Raw	Coalition Conservative
1922	Sir Harold Smith	Unionist
1923	Hugh Rathbone	Liberal
1924	John Tinné	Unionist
1931 by-election	Ronald Nall-Cain	Conservative
1935 by-election	Joseph Cleary	Labour
1935	Peter Stapleton Shaw	Conservative
1945	Victor Raikes	Conservative
1950	John Tilney	Conservative
Feb 1974	Anthony Steen	Conservative
1983	Constituency abolished	
1997	Jane Kennedy	Labour
2010	Luciana Berger	Labour Co-op
Feb 2019	Luciana Berger	Change UK
Jun 2019	Luciana Berger	Independent
Jul 2019	Luciana Berger	The Independents
Sep 2019	Luciana Berger	Liberal Democrats
2019	Paula Barker	Labour

== Elections ==
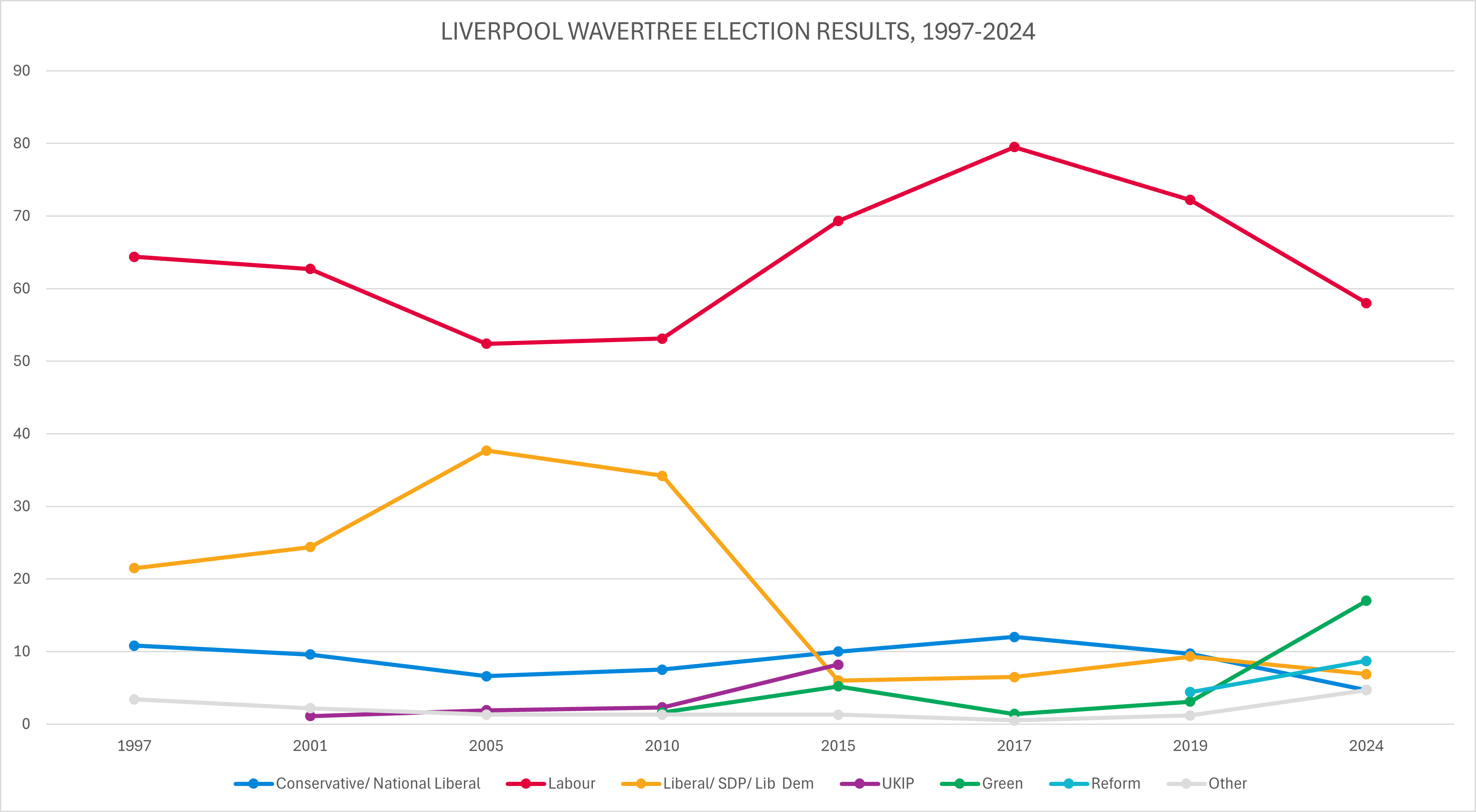
Election results 1983–2024

=== Elections in the 2020s ===
General election 2024: Liverpool Wavertree
Party	Candidate	Votes	%	±%
Labour	Paula Barker	23,077	58.0	−13.6
Green	Tom Crone	6,773	17.0	+10.8
Reform	Adam Heatherington	3,454	8.7	+5.0
Liberal Democrats	Rob McAlister-Bell	2,759	6.9	−1.1
Conservative	Charlotte Eagar	1,887	4.7	−4.9
Independent	Ann San	1,191	3.0	N/A
Independent	Mohamed El Ghady	566	1.4	N/A
Independent	Joe Owens	108	0.3	N/A
Majority		16,304	41.0	−21.5
Turnout		39,815	56.0	−12.4
Registered electors		70,581		
Labour hold		Swing	-12.2	

=== Elections in the 2010s ===
General election 2019: Liverpool Wavertree
Party	Candidate	Votes	%	±%
Labour	Paula Barker	31,310	72.2	−7.3
Conservative	Catherine Mulhern	4,225	9.7	−2.3
Liberal Democrats	Richard Kemp	4,055	9.3	+2.8
Brexit Party	Adam Heatherington	1,921	4.4	New
Green	Kay Inckle	1,365	3.1	+1.7
Liberal	Mick Coyne	501	1.2	New
Majority		27,085	62.5	−5.0
Turnout		43,377	68.4	−1.7
Labour hold		Swing	−2.2	

General election 2017: Liverpool Wavertree
Party	Candidate	Votes	%	±%
Labour Co-op	Luciana Berger	34,717	79.5	+10.2
Conservative	Denise Haddad	5,251	12.0	+2.0
Liberal Democrats	Richard Kemp	2,858	6.5	+0.5
Green	Ted Grant	598	1.4	−3.8
Independent	Adam Heatherington	216	0.5	New
Majority		29,466	67.5	+8.2
Turnout		43,640	70.1	+3.7
Labour Co-op hold		Swing	+4.1	

General election 2015: Liverpool Wavertree
Party	Candidate	Votes	%	±%
Labour Co-op	Luciana Berger	28,401	69.3	+16.2
Conservative	James Pearson	4,098	10.0	+2.5
UKIP	Adam Heatherington	3,375	8.2	+5.9
Liberal Democrats	Leo Evans	2,454	6.0	−28.2
Green	Peter Cranie	2,140	5.2	+3.6
TUSC	David Walsh	362	0.9	New
Independent	Niamh McCarthy	144	0.4	New
Majority		24,303	59.3	+40.4
Turnout		40,974	66.4	+5.8
Labour Co-op hold		Swing	+6.9	

General election 2010: Liverpool Wavertree
Party	Candidate	Votes	%	±%
Labour Co-op	Luciana Berger	20,132	53.1	+0.7
Liberal Democrats	Colin Eldridge	12,965	34.2	−3.5
Conservative	Andrew Garnett	2,830	7.5	+1.0
UKIP	Neil Miney	890	2.3	+0.4
Green	Rebecca Lawson	598	1.6	New
Socialist Labour	Kim Singleton	200	0.5	−0.2
BNP	Steven McEllenborough	150	0.4	New
Independent	Franke Dunne	149	0.4	New
Majority		7,167	18.9	+4.2
Turnout		37,914	60.6	+12.8
Labour Co-op hold		Swing	+2.1	

=== Elections in the 2000s ===
General election 2005: Liverpool Wavertree
Party	Candidate	Votes	%	±%
Labour	Jane Kennedy	18,441	52.4	−10.3
Liberal Democrats	Colin Eldridge	13,268	37.7	+13.3
Conservative	Jason Steen	2,331	6.6	−3.0
UKIP	Mark Bill	660	1.9	+0.8
Socialist Labour	Gary Theys	244	0.7	−0.4
Democratic Socialist Alliance	Paul Filby	227	0.6	−0.5
Majority		5,173	14.7	−23.6
Turnout		35,171	50.8	+6.5
Labour hold		Swing	−11.8	

General election 2001: Liverpool Wavertree
Party	Candidate	Votes	%	±%
Labour	Jane Kennedy	20,155	62.7	−1.7
Liberal Democrats	Christopher Newby	7,836	24.4	+2.9
Conservative	Geoffrey Allen	3,091	9.6	−1.2
Socialist Labour	Michael Lane	359	1.1	New
Socialist Alliance	Mark O'Brien	349	1.1	New
UKIP	Neil Miney	348	1.1	New
Majority		12,319	38.3	−4.6
Turnout		32,138	44.3	−18.4
Labour hold		Swing	−2.3	

=== Elections in the 1990s ===
General election 1997: Liverpool Wavertree
Party	Candidate	Votes	%	±%
Labour	Jane Kennedy	29,592	64.4	+23.1
Liberal Democrats	Richard Kemp	9,891	21.5	−13.2
Conservative	Kit Malthouse	4,944	10.8	−1.7
Referendum	Peter A. Worthington	576	1.3	New
Liberal	Keith McCullough	391	0.9	New
ProLife Alliance	Racheal A. Kingsley	346	0.8	New
Workers Revolutionary	Carole Corkhill	178	0.4	New
Majority		19,701	42.9	
Turnout		45,918	62.7	
Labour win (new seat)				

=== Elections in the 1970s ===
General election 1979: Liverpool Wavertree
Party	Candidate	Votes	%	±%
Conservative	Anthony Steen	21,770	50.3	+4.5
Labour Co-op	Roy Morris	14,828	34.2	−5.0
Liberal	C. W. Roberts	6,705	15.5	+0.5
Majority		6,942	15.9	+9.2
Turnout		43,303	73.4	+4.1
Conservative hold		Swing	+4.8	

General election October 1974: Liverpool Wavertree
Party	Candidate	Votes	%	±%
Conservative	Anthony Steen	18,971	45.9	+2.8
Labour Co-op	Roy Morris	16,216	39.2	+8.1
Liberal	Anthony Limont	6,193	15.0	−10.9
Majority		2,755	6.7	
Turnout		41,380	69.3	−5.5
Conservative hold		Swing	−5.5	

General election February 1974: Liverpool Wavertree
Party	Candidate	Votes	%	±%
Conservative	Anthony Steen	19,027	43.0	
Labour	Ian Levin	13,752	31.1	
Liberal	Cyril Carr	11,450	25.9	
Majority		5,275	11.9	
Turnout		44,229	74.8	
Conservative hold		Swing		

General election 1970: Liverpool Wavertree
Party	Candidate	Votes	%	±%
Conservative	John Tilney	19,127	46.6	−2.0
Liberal	Cyril Carr	11,650	28.4	+11.3
Labour	Gordon Woodburn	10,253	25.0	−9.3
Majority		7,477	18.2	+3.9
Turnout		41,030	69.2	−0.9
Conservative hold		Swing		

=== Elections in the 1960s ===
General election 1966: Liverpool Wavertree
Party	Candidate	Votes	%	±%
Conservative	John Tilney	19,179	48.58	
Labour	Robert Ashcroft	13,529	34.27	
Liberal	Cyril Carr	6,771	17.15	
Majority		5,650	14.31	
Turnout		39,479	70.97	
Conservative hold		Swing		

General election 1964: Liverpool Wavertree
Party	Candidate	Votes	%	±%
Conservative	John Tilney	20,598	49.45	
Labour	Stanley Thorne	12,338	29.62	
Liberal	Cyril Carr	8,719	20.93	
Majority		8,260	19.83	
Turnout		41,655	73.74	
Conservative hold		Swing		

=== Elections in the 1950s ===
General election 1959: Liverpool Wavertree
Party	Candidate	Votes	%	±%
Conservative	John Tilney	26,624	63.12	
Labour	Milicent Aspin	10,392	24.64	
Liberal	Tom Stuttard Rothwell	5,161	12.24	New
Majority		16,232	38.48	
Turnout		42,177	75.75	
Conservative hold		Swing		

General election 1955: Liverpool Wavertree
Party	Candidate	Votes	%	±%
Conservative	John Tilney	28,172	69.18	
Labour	Milicent Aspin	12,552	30.82	
Majority		15,620	38.36	
Turnout		40,724	70.84	
Conservative hold		Swing		

General election 1951: Liverpool Wavertree
Party	Candidate	Votes	%	±%
Conservative	John Tilney	28,179	58.85	
Labour	William Hamling	19,702	41.15	
Majority		8,477	17.70	
Turnout		47,881	78.32	
Conservative hold		Swing		

General election 1950: Liverpool Wavertree
Party	Candidate	Votes	%	±%
Conservative	John Tilney	26,164	52.08	
Labour	William Hamling	18,559	36.94	
Liberal	Thomas John Vernon Parry	5,512	10.97	
Majority		7,605	15.14	
Turnout		50,235	82.42	
Conservative hold		Swing		

=== Elections in the 1940s ===
General election 1945: Liverpool Wavertree
Party	Candidate	Votes	%	±%
Conservative	Victor Raikes	25,470	48.2	−10.3
Labour	Derek Maurice Van Abbé	20,249	38.4	−3.1
Liberal	Leslie Hall Storey	7,063	13.4	New
Majority		5,221	9.8	−7.2
Turnout		52,782	73.1	−0.1
Conservative hold		Swing	−3.6	

A general election was planned for 1939–1940 but was postponed because of war. By the end of 1939, the following candidates had been selected;

- Conservative: Peter Stapleton Shaw
- Labour: Clifford Kenyon
- Liberal: Nelia Muspratt

=== Elections in the 1930s ===
General election 1935: Liverpool Wavertree
Party	Candidate	Votes	%	±%
Conservative	Peter Stapleton Shaw	26,915	58.5	−19.4
Labour	Joseph Cleary	19,068	41.5	+19.4
Majority		7,847	17.0	N/A
Turnout		45,983	73.2	−2.0
Conservative hold		Swing	−10.6	

1935 Liverpool Wavertree by-election
Party	Candidate	Votes	%	±%
Labour	Joseph Cleary	15,611	35.3	+13.2
Conservative	James Platt	13,711	31.2	−46.7
Ind. Conservative	Randolph Churchill	10,575	23.9	New
Liberal	Tudor Artro Morris	4,208	9.5	New
Majority		1,840	4.1	N/A
Turnout		44,165	72.3	−2.9
Labour gain from Conservative		Swing	−30.0	

General election 1931: Liverpool Wavertree
Party	Candidate	Votes	%	±%
Conservative	Ronald Nall-Cain	33,476	77.9	+12.9
Labour	Colin Clark	9,504	22.1	−12.9
Majority		23,972	55.8	+25.8
Turnout		42,980	75.2	−3.9
Conservative hold		Swing	+12.9	

1931 Liverpool Wavertree by-election
Party	Candidate	Votes	%	±%
Conservative	Ronald Nall-Cain	18,687	65.0	+25.0
Labour	Samuel Lewis Treleaven	10,042	35.0	+2.8
Majority		8,645	30.0	+22.2
Turnout		28,729	51.7	−26.4
Conservative hold		Swing	+11.2	

=== Elections in the 1920s ===
General election 1929: Liverpool Wavertree
Party	Candidate	Votes	%	±%
Unionist	John Tinné	16,880	40.0	−7.4
Labour	Samuel Lewis Treleaven	13,585	32.2	−2.8
Liberal	Hugh Rathbone	11,723	27.8	+10.2
Majority		3,295	7.8	−4.6
Turnout		42,188	78.1	−2.2
Registered electors		53,989		
Unionist hold		Swing	−2.3	

General election 1924: Liverpool Wavertree
Party	Candidate	Votes	%	±%
Unionist	John Tinné	14,063	47.4	+12.7
Labour	William Robinson	10,383	35.0	+7.0
Liberal	Hugh Rathbone	5,206	17.6	−19.7
Majority		3,680	12.4	N/A
Turnout		29,652	80.3	+8.4
Registered electors		36,936		
Unionist gain from Liberal		Swing	+16.2	

General election 1923: Liverpool Wavertree
Party	Candidate	Votes	%	±%
Liberal	Hugh Rathbone	9,349	37.3	New
Unionist	Harold Smith	8,700	34.7	−26.9
Labour	James Vint Laughland	7,025	28.0	−10.4
Majority		649	2.6	N/A
Turnout		25,074	71.9	+2.4
Registered electors		34,869		
Liberal gain from Unionist		Swing		

General election 1922: Liverpool Wavertree
Party	Candidate	Votes	%	±%
Unionist	Harold Smith	14,372	61.6	+1.7
Labour	James Vint Laughland	8,941	38.4	+11.4
Majority		5,431	23.2	−9.7
Turnout		23,313	69.5	+9.0
Registered electors		33,558		
Unionist hold		Swing	−4.9	

=== Elections in the 1910s ===
General election 1918: Liverpool Wavertree
Party		Candidate	Votes	%	±%
C	Unionist	Nathan Raw	11,326	59.9	
	Labour	Charles Wilson	5,103	27.0	
	Liberal	Alfred Allen Booth	2,484	13.1	
Majority			6,223	32.9	
Turnout			18,913	60.5	
Registered electors			31,262		
	Unionist win (new seat)				
C indicates candidate endorsed by the coalition government.

== See also ==
- List of parliamentary constituencies in Merseyside
