= Gilbert Greenall =

Gilbert Greenall may refer to:

- Sir Gilbert Greenall, 1st Baronet (1806–1894), Conservative Member of Parliament and businessman
- Gilbert Greenall, 1st Baron Daresbury (1867–1938), businessman, son of the above
- Gilbert Greenall (humanitarian advisor), adviser to both the UK government and United Nations on humanitarian emergencies
