= Edmund Hornby =

Edmund Hornby may refer to:

- Edmund Hornby (politician) (1773–1857), British politician
- Edmund George Hornby (1799–1865), his son, British politician
- Sir Edmund Grimani Hornby (1825–1896), British judge in Turkey and China
- Edmund Phipps-Hornby (1857–1947), British general and recipient of Victoria Cross
