= Alison Garland =

British politician and suffragist

Alison Garland

Alison Vickers Garland (10 April 1862 – 26 September 1939), was a suffragist and British Liberal Party politician.

== Background ==
Garland was born in Birkenhead in 1862. She was the second daughter of Alfred Stephen Garland, master silversmith and Isabella Priestley of Grovefield, Birkenhead.

== Political career ==
Garland was involved in various political groups. She was a member of the executive committee of the Union of Practical Suffragists in 1897. In 1899, she was elected as the president of the Devon Union of the Women's Liberal Associations. Also in 1899, she was the delegate from the British Indian Parliamentary Committee that was sent to the Indian National Congress in Lucknow.

She rose to prominence in the Liberal Party, firstly as President of Tavistock Women's Liberal Association. In 1904 she became a member of the executive of the Women's National Liberal Federation. She was also an active member of the National Union of Women's Suffrage Societies, the leading mass organisation campaigning for Votes for Women. In 1908 she joined the Women's Liberals Forward Suffrage Union, a successor organisation to the Union of Practical Suffragists. In 1911, she was part of this group that met with Liberal Government leaders H. H. Asquith and David Lloyd George to discuss the introduction of Votes for Women. Despite her prominence in the Liberal Party and in the Suffrage movement, she never secured a candidacy in Tavistock or any promising constituency for a Liberal candidate. She was Liberal candidate for the Portsmouth South Division of Hampshire at the 1918 General Election. She had the support of Liberal Party Leader H. H. Asquith but not that of the Coalition Prime Minister David Lloyd George who endorsed her Unionist opponent;

General Election 1918: Portsmouth South
Party	Candidate	Votes	%	±%
Unionist	Herbert Robin Cayzer	15,842	68.3	n/a
Liberal	Miss Alison Vickers Garland	4,283	18.5	n/a
Labour	J. Lacey	3,070	13.2	n/a
Majority		11,559	49.8	n/a
Turnout				n/a
Unionist win				

She was Liberal candidate for the Dartford Division of Kent at the 1922 General Election. Again, she lacked the support of Lloyd George, whose candidate gained the seat;

General Election 1922: Dartford
Party	Candidate	Votes	%	±%
National Liberal	George William Symonds Jarrett	16,662	49.6	n/a
Labour	John Edmund Mills	14,744	43.9	+6.3
Liberal	Miss Alison Vickers Garland	2,175	6.5	−10.3
Majority		1,918	5.7	
Turnout			71.2	
National Liberal hold		Swing	n/a	

She did not contest either the 1923 or 1924 General Elections. In July 1924, at the women's international housing congress at Caxton Hall, she identified a lack of tradesmen as a factor in the housing shortage in Britain. Early in 1929 she was approached by Barrow Liberal Association to be their prospective parliamentary candidate but declined. She was instead Liberal candidate for the unpromising Warrington Division of Lancashire at the 1929 General Election;

General Election 1929: Warrington
Party	Candidate	Votes	%	±%
Labour	Charles Dukes	21,610	50.6	
Unionist	Noel Barre Goldie	18,025	42.2	
Liberal	Miss Alison Vickers Garland	3,070	7.2	
Majority		3,585	8.4	
Turnout				
Labour gain from Unionist		Swing		

She did not stand for parliament again. However, she continued to speak for the Liberal Party around the country. She was President of the Women's National Liberal Federation from 1934-36. On 11 May 1937 she was awarded the OBE for political and public services.
