= Gilbert Greenall (humanitarian advisor) =

Dr The Honourable Gilbert Greenall CBE DL
- Born: 16 August 1954 (age 72); London, UK
- Education: Eton College
- Occupations: Government and UN adviser
- Spouse: Melissa Greenall (m. 2021, current)
- Children: 4

Gilbert Greenall, CBE DL (born 16 August 1954) is a British physician, a senior adviser to both the British government and the United Nations on humanitarian emergencies and on the welfare of civilians during and after conflict. He also serves as Vice Lord-Lieutenant of Worcestershire.

Greenall is the second son of the 3rd Baron Daresbury. His elder brother is Peter Greenall, 4th Baron Daresbury.

Greenall has worked on 37 humanitarian emergencies, of which 18 were conflict-related, given evidence to the Defence Select Committee of the House of Commons on Afghanistan and spoken at the Royal Society of Medicine on emergency healthcare and the welfare of civilians during armed conflicts.

Greenall has been adviser to British military commanders in Northern Iraq, Bosnia, East Timor, Sierra Leone, and Macedonia, and to the commander of UNIFIL in Southern Lebanon, and the deputy commanders in both Iraq and Afghanistan.

Following a presentation to the Defence Academy in 2003, Greenall wrote an article for the British Army Review entitled "Winning the Peace: Post Conflict Recovery in the 21st Century".

After Eton and Sandhurst, Greenall served a short service commission in the Life Guards for four years before going to business school at Fontainebleu in France, where he obtained a bilingual English/French MBA. He qualified as a Bachelor of Medicine (MB) & Bachelor of Surgery (ChB) from Bristol University, and spent ten years on and off as a senior house officer at Cheltenham General Hospital while beginning his humanitarian career as a volunteer in the jungles of Cambodia.

From the final days of the Khmer Rouge to the chaos of Baghdad in 2016, Greenall describes his involvement in human catastrophe in his memoir Combat Civilian (2019).

Greenall was appointed a Commander of the Order of the British Empire in 1993, awarded an honorary doctorate in Medicine by the University of Bristol in 2006, and served as High Sheriff of Herefordshire in 2009–10.

In April 2023 Greenall was appointed Vice Lord-Lieutenant of Worcestershire.

He was appointed Honorary Colonel Birmingham University Officers′ Training Corps on 1 December 2024.
