= Thomas Claughton =

Thomas Claughton may refer to:

- Thomas Claughton (MP) (1773–1842), Member of Parliament for Newton 1818–1825
- Thomas Legh Claughton (1808–1892), British academic, poet and clergyman, son of the above
