= Edward Greenall, 2nd Baron Daresbury =

British peer

Edward Greenall, 2nd Baron Daresbury (12 October 1902 – 15 February 1990) was a British business man, landowner, and member of the House of Lords from 1938 until his death.

Greenall was the son of Gilbert Greenall, 1st Baron Daresbury, a baronet who was raised to the peerage in 1927, and his wife Frances Eliza, a daughter of Captain Edward Wynne Griffith. He was educated at Wixenford School and Eton College and in 1921 was commissioned into the Life Guards. In 1934 he became Joint Master of the Belvoir Hunt with Lt.-Colonel Colman.

Daresbury was a dog breeder as well as a master of foxhounds. The family's wealth came from the Greenall's brewery, established by an ancestor, Thomas Greenall, in 1762.

Greenall married Margaret Ada, a daughter of C. J. Crawford of Wayside, St Andrews, and they had three sons and one daughter. Having succeeded his father in 1938, by the end of his life in 1990 Daresbury was living at Altavilla, Askeaton, County Limerick, Ireland.

== Arms ==
Coat of arms of Edward Greenall, 2nd Baron Daresbury
Crest Between two wings Or a pomme surmounted by a bugle horn as in the arms. Escutcheon Quarterly 1st & 4th Or on a bend nebuly Vert three bugle horns stringed of the field (Greenall) 2nd & 3rd Argent five pallets Sable the centre pallet charged with an Ermine spot of the field. Supporters Dexter a bull Proper sinister a bay mare mane and tail Sable charged on the shoulder with a sprig of two oak leaves Or. Motto Alta Peto Badge A rose Gules and two ears of wheat leaved and slipped in saltire Proper enfiled with a baron’s coronet Or.

== Notes ==
Peerage of the United Kingdom
Preceded by Gilbert Greenall	Baron Daresbury; 1938–1990	Succeeded by Edward Gilbert Greenall
Baronetage of the United Kingdom
Preceded by Gilbert Greenall	Baronet (of Walton Hall); 1938–1990	Succeeded by Edward Gilbert Greenall
