= Harold Smith (British politician) =

British politician

Sir Harold Smith
- Born: April 18, 1876
- Died: September 10, 1924 (aged 48)

Sir Harold Smith (18 April 1876 – 10 September 1924) was a Conservative Party politician in the United Kingdom, perhaps better known for having been the brother of F. E. Smith than for his own comparatively modest parliamentary career.

== Parliamentary career ==
Smith unsuccessfully contested the West Riding of Yorkshire constituency of Huddersfield at the January 1910 general election, but at the December 1910 general election, Smith was elected as the Member of Parliament (MP) for Warrington in Lancashire. His victory over the sitting Liberal Party MP Arthur Crosfield was a narrow one, but at the post-war general election in December 1918, Smith received the coalition coupon and was re-elected with a large majority. He was knighted in the 1921 New Year Honours.

At the 1922 general election, he did not stand again in Warrington, where he was succeeded as MP by another Conservative, Alec Cunningham-Reid who had been a flying ace in World War I. Smith stood instead in Liverpool Wavertree, a safe Conservative seat which returned him to the House of Commons with a large majority. However, at the December 1923 general election, he lost the seat with a massive swing to the Liberal Party candidate Hugh Rathbone.

== Personal life ==
Smith married Beatrice Furneaux, the sister of Margaret Furneaux, his brother FE's wife, in London in September 1914. The couple had one child, Harold Anthony Warrington Smith, (known as Anthony), who later died at the age of 26 on 4 August 1944 when his jeep ran over a mine during the Battle of Florence. Harold Smith died of cancer on 10 April 1924, aged 48.

Parliament of the United Kingdom
Preceded by Arthur Crosfield	Member of Parliament for Warrington; December 1910 – 1922	Succeeded by Alec Cunningham-Reid
Preceded by Nathan Raw	Member of Parliament for Liverpool Wavertree; 1922 – 1923	Succeeded by Hugh Rathbone
