= Baron Daresbury =

Barony in the Peerage of the United Kingdom

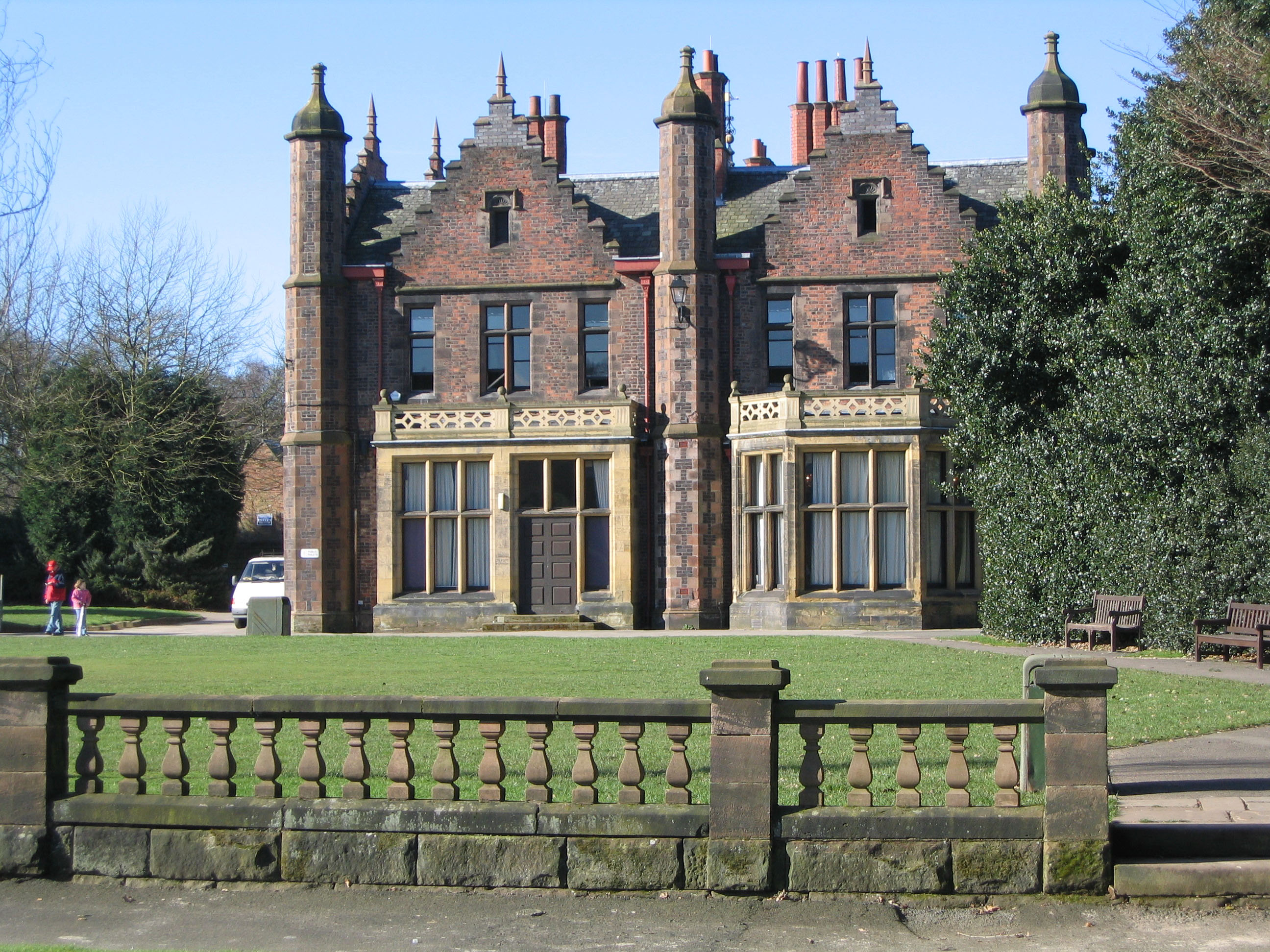
Walton Hall, the former seat of the Greenall family.

Baron Daresbury, of Walton in the County of Chester, is a title in the Peerage of the United Kingdom. It was created on 21 June 1927 for Sir Gilbert Greenall, 2nd Baronet by King George V. The Baronetcy, of Walton Hall in the County of Chester, was created in the Baronetage of the United Kingdom on 22 February 1876 for his father Gilbert Greenall, who was head of the family brewing business (later Greenall's and now the De Vere Group) and also represented Warrington in the House of Commons as a Conservative. As of 2015 the titles are held by the first Baron's great-grandson, the fourth Baron, who succeeded his father in 1996. The former seat of the Greenall family was Walton Hall near Warrington, Cheshire. However, the house was sold in 1941. The fourth Lord Daresbury was based at Hall Lane Farm on the Daresbury estate, home of the Creamfields music festival.

== Greenall baronets, of Walton Hall (1876) ==
- Sir Gilbert Greenall, 1st Baronet (1806–1894)
- Sir Gilbert Greenall, 2nd Baronet (1867–1938) (created Baron Daresbury in 1927)

== Barons Daresbury (1927) ==
- Gilbert Greenall, 1st Baron Daresbury (1867–1938)
- Edward Greenall, 2nd Baron Daresbury (1902–1990)
- Edward Gilbert Greenall, 3rd Baron Daresbury (1928–1996)
- Peter Gilbert Greenall, 4th Baron Daresbury (born 1953)

The heir apparent is the present holder's son, the Hon. Thomas Edward Greenall (born 1984)

== Arms ==
Coat of arms of Baron Daresbury
Crest Between two wings Or a pomme surmounted by a bugle horn as in the arms. Escutcheon Quarterly 1st & 4th Or on a bend nebuly Vert three bugle horns stringed of the field (Greenall) 2nd & 3rd Argent five pallets Sable the centre pallet charged with an Ermine spot of the field. Supporters Dexter a bull Proper sinister a bay mare mane and tail Sable charged on the shoulder with a sprig of two oak leaves Or. Motto Alta Peto Badge A rose Gules and two ears of wheat leaved and slipped in saltire Proper enfiled with a baron’s coronet Or.

Baronetage of the United Kingdom
Preceded by Leslie baronets	Greenall baronets of Walton Hall; 22 February 1876	Succeeded by Hardy baronets
