= Arthur Crosfield =

Sir Arthur Crosfield Bt GBE

Sir Arthur Henry Crosfield, 1st Baronet (5 April 1865 – 22 September 1938) was a Liberal Member of Parliament (MP) for Warrington from 1906 to December 1910.

== Background ==
In 1907 he married Domini Elliadi who was also active in Liberal politics.

== Political career ==
He was elected during the 1906 Liberal landslide gaining Warrington from the Conservative Robert Pierpont. He was re-elected in January 1910 but defeated by the Conservative Harold Smith in December 1910. He was created a baronet, of Highgate in the County of Middlesex, on 24 June 1915. He was interested in the Balkans, and wrote The Settlement of the Near East, published in 1922.

== Business career ==
From his parents, he inherited the business of Joseph Crosfield and Sons, soap and candle manufacturers. He sold the company in 1911, bought Parkfield, an elegant 18th-century house in Highgate, north London, on the proceeds and rebuilt and enlarged it over the next seven years as Witanhurst ("Parliament on the Hill"), being the largest house in London after Buckingham Palace.

He was a keen golfer and won many championships, including the French Open Amateur Championship. Crosfield was also chairman of the National Playing Fields Association, for which he was appointed a Knight Grand Cross of the Order of the British Empire (GBE) in 1929. He served as a School Governor for Highgate School from 1929 to 1930.

Crosfield lost a fortune in a failed Greek mining venture in the mid-1930s, and was killed shortly thereafter when he fell out of the window of a railway sleeper car near Toulon in southern France.

Parliament of the United Kingdom
Preceded by Robert Pierpont	Member of Parliament for Warrington; 1906 – December 1910	Succeeded by Harold Smith
Baronetage of the United Kingdom
New creation	Baronet (of Highgate); 1915–1938	Extinct
