= Wixenford School =

Coordinates: 51.400°N 0.826°W

Location
- Wokingham; England

Information
- Type: Private preparatory school
- Established: 1869
- Founder: Richard Cowley Powles
- Closed: 1934
- Gender: Boys
- Age: 7 to 13 or 14
- Old boys: Old Wixenfordians

Wixenford School, also known as Wixenford Preparatory School and Wixenford-Eversley, was a private preparatory school for boys near Wokingham, England, founded in 1869. A feeder school for Eton, after it closed in 1934 its former buildings were taken over by the present-day Ludgrove School.

== History ==
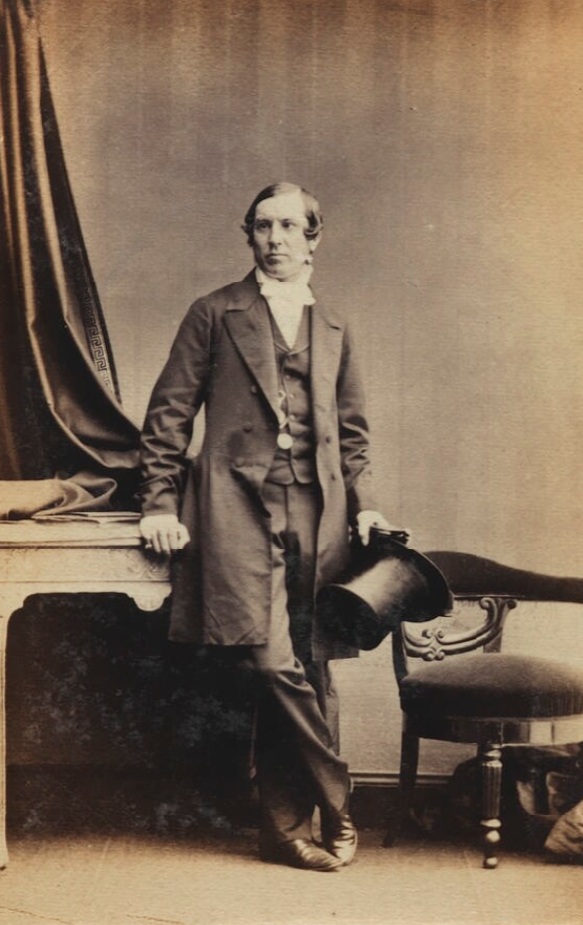
Richard Cowley Powles in 1861

The school was founded in 1869 at Wixenford House, Eversley, Hampshire, by its first head master, Richard Cowley Powles (1819–1901), a Church of England clergyman, and has been described as "successful and fashionable". Among the school's first intake of boys, in May 1869, was George Nathaniel Curzon, a future Viceroy of India.

Before being attached to the school, "Wixenford" was the name of its first home, a new country house built for Powles at Eversley in 1868–69. Powles, who in his youth had been a fellow of Exeter College, Oxford, had previously operated a school at Blackheath, and he came to Eversley to be near his lifelong friend Charles Kingsley. After Kingsley's death in 1875, Powles became less active in the school and retired as headmaster in 1879. He moved to Chichester in 1881, where he became a prebendary of the cathedral. One of his boys at Wixenford, Albert Baillie, writing in the 1950s, recalled Powles as "a genuine educator and a remarkable man" and noted that he had worn his hair "neatly brushed up into two horns above his ears".

Powles was succeeded in 1879 by Ernest Penrose Arnold, a graduate of Balliol College, Oxford, the son of Charles Thomas Arnold (1817–1878) who taught at Rugby School. E. P. Arnold remained as head master of the school until 1903. At six feet, five inches, in height, Arnold has been described by Rupert Croft-Cooke as "a kindly but rather frightening bearded man". Wixenford was still small, as most such schools were at the time, and a school photograph of the early 1880s shows thirty-nine boys, plus Arnold and five other masters.

The school moved to Luckley Park, Wokingham, Berkshire, in 1887. Throughout its history, it had a close connection with Eton, to which many boys progressed at about the age of thirteen. A few boys stayed longer, and at least one, Peter Anson, was almost fifteen when he left the school in the summer of 1904.

In 1903, Arnold was succeeded as headmaster by Philip Howard Morton (1857–1925), who had been a Cambridge cricketer, and in 1910 Country Life magazine noted that he kept a private golf course at the school and that his boys played golf "vigorously" in the Easter term. In 1910, Morton was joined by two joint headmasters, who came in as business partners, Harold Wallis and Ernest Garnett, forming a triumvirate. By 1920, Morton had retired and had been replaced by Charles Mansfield, but Wallis and Garnett remained. By 1924, Mansfield was acting as the sole headmaster, with the other two men as partners. In September 1931 Garnett withdrew from the partnership.

Amid the Great Depression of the 1930s, Wixenford suffered a decline in numbers and finally closed in 1934. The last headmaster, Charles Mansfield, had been elected as Mayor of Wokingham for the year. He took holy orders and in October 1934 was instituted as Vicar of Dunsford in Devon, standing down early as mayor to take up his new post.

With the school's demise, its former buildings presented an opportunity for another fashionable prep school, Ludgrove, until then based at Cockfosters, which moved onto the site in 1937. In 1942, an article in The Sphere, recalling the Edwardian era, noted "the conventional three rungs to Parnassus, Wixenford, Eton and Oxford (or what you will)".

While retaining its existing school name, Ludgrove kept "Wixenford" as the name of its new premises, and was still so using it in 1988.

The original Wixenford House, in which the school was begun, is now the home of St Neot's Preparatory School.

== Old Wixenfordians ==
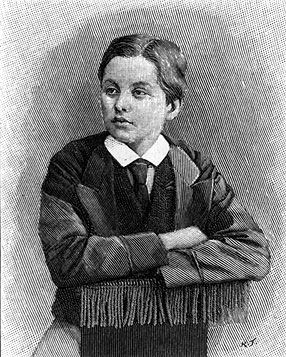
George Nathaniel Curzon in the 1870s

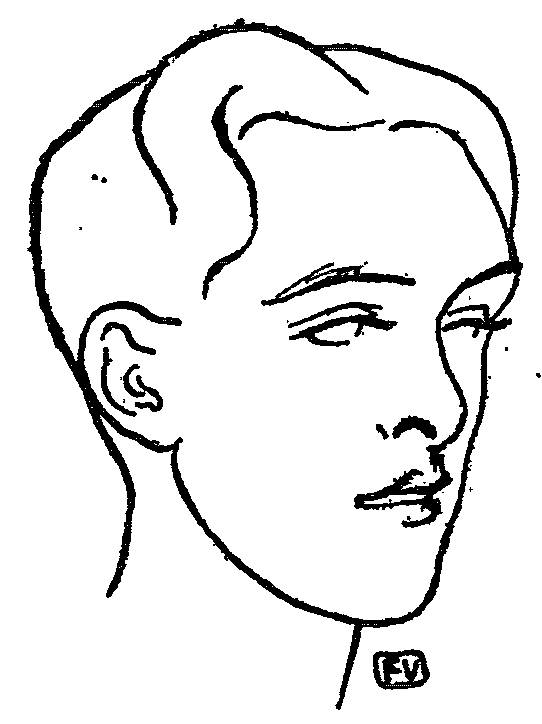
Lord Alfred Douglas by Félix Vallotton

Old boys of the school are called Old Wixenfordians. The following, in chronological order, are among the most notable.

- George Nathaniel Curzon, 1st Marquess Curzon of Kedleston (1859–1925), Viceroy of India and British Foreign Secretary
- Thomas Gibson-Carmichael, 1st Baron Carmichael (1859–1926), Liberal politician and colonial administrator
- Sir Wilfrid Lawson, 3rd Baronet, of Brayton (1862–1937), Liberal member of parliament
- Cyril Maude (1862–1951), actor-manager
- Albert Victor Baillie (1864–1955), Dean of Windsor
- Gilbert Greenall, 1st Baron Daresbury (1867–1938), brewer, landowner, peer, and master of foxhounds
- Lord Alfred Douglas, or "Bosie" (1870–1945), poet and translator, intimate friend of Oscar Wilde
- Frederick Pethick-Lawrence, 1st Baron Pethick-Lawrence (1871–1961), Labour politician, Secretary of State for India
- R. C. Trevelyan (1872–1951), poet
- Hugh Law (1872–1943), Irish politician
- Nugent Hicks (1872–1942), Bishop of Lincoln
- Sir Walter Wilson Greg (1875–1959), Shakespeare scholar
- George Macaulay Trevelyan (1876–1962), historian
- Arnold Wienholt (1877–1940), Australian politician
- Edmund Parker, 4th Earl of Morley (1877–1951), soldier and landowner
- Sir Howard Kennard (1878–1955), British diplomat
- William Leveson-Gower, 4th Earl Granville (1880–1953), admiral
- Sir Stewart Gore-Browne (1883–1967), settler and politician in Northern Rhodesia
- Ralph Glyn, 1st Baron Glyn (1884–1960), soldier and Conservative politician
- Peter Anson (1889–1975), monk, writer, and artist
- Duff Cooper (1890–1954), Conservative politician and diplomat
- Edward Greenall, 2nd Baron Daresbury, brewer, landowner, and peer
- William Howard, 8th Earl of Wicklow (1902–1978), clergyman, writer and translator
- Sir Edmund Bacon, 13th Baronet, KG (1903–1982), landowner and Lord Lieutenant of Norfolk
- Kenneth Clark (1903–1983), art historian
- Prince Charles, Count of Flanders (1903–1983)
- Alfred Duggan (1903–1964), historical novelist
- Hubert Duggan (1904–1943), Conservative politician
- James Stern (1904–1993), Anglo-Irish writer
- Sir Harold Acton (1904–1994), historian
- Edward Ward, 7th Viscount Bangor (1905–1993), BBC war correspondent and author
- David Herbert (1908–1995), socialite, memoirist and interior decorator
- Sir Frederick Warner (1918–1995), diplomat
- Sir Guy Millard (1917–2013), British Ambassador
- William Whitelaw, (1918–1999), Home Secretary
- Henry Paget, 7th Marquess of Anglesey (1922–2013), author and peer
