= 1932 St Marylebone by-election =

UK Parliamentary by-election

The 1932 St Marylebone by-election was held on 28 April 1932. The by-election was held due to the elevation to the peerage of the incumbent Conservative MP, Rennell Rodd. It was won by the Conservative candidate Alec Cunningham-Reid.

St Marylebone by-election, 1932
Party	Candidate	Votes	%	±%
Conservative	Alec Cunningham-Reid	11,677	52.3	−34.4
Ind. Conservative	Basil Phillott Blackett	10,664	47.7	New
Majority		1,013	4.6	−68.8
Turnout		22,341	30.8	−32.7
Conservative hold		Swing		
