= Sir Gilbert Greenall, 1st Baronet =

British businessman and politician (1806–94)

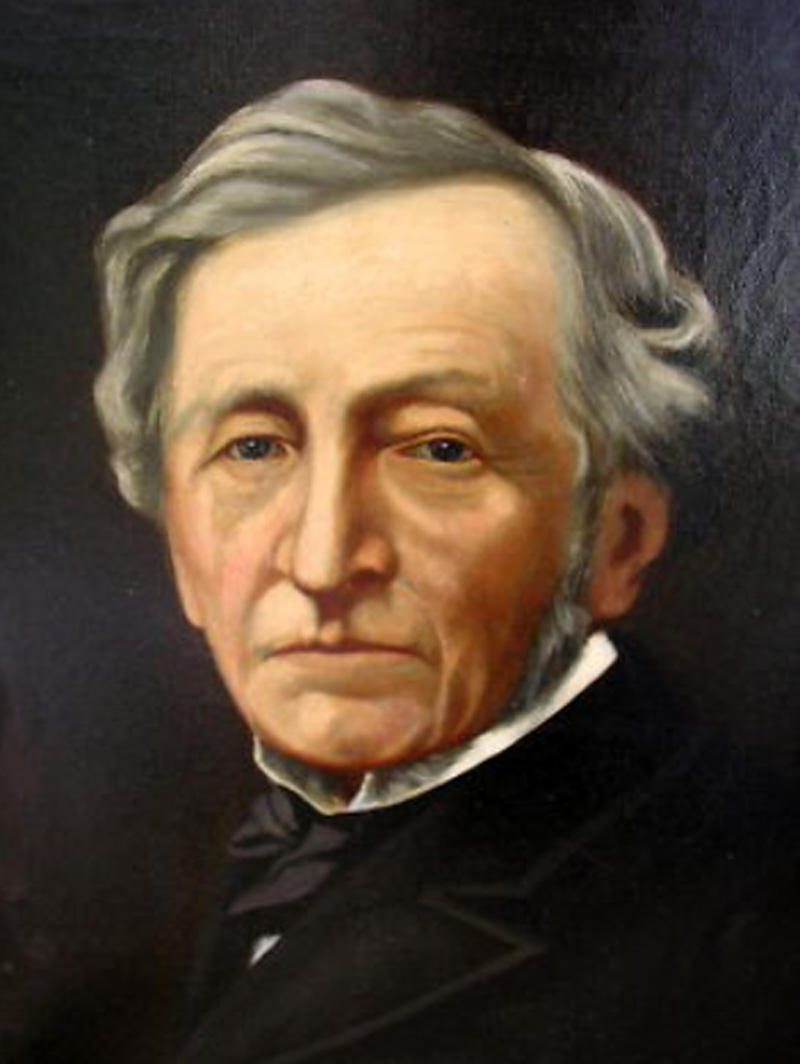
Gilbert Greenall, c.1870

Sir Gilbert Greenall, 1st Baronet, DL, JP (11 May 1806 – 10 July 1894) was a British businessman and Conservative politician who sat in the House of Commons between 1847 and 1892.

== Life ==
Greenall was the sixth and youngest son of Edward Greenall of Walton Hall, Cheshire. His grandfather was Thomas Greenall, who had established a brewery in St Helens in 1762, on which the family wealth was based. Greenall assumed control of the family brewery business and also had interests in the St Helens Canal and Railway Company and in Parr, Lyons and Greenall Bank, based in Warrington. He was and a J.P. for Lancashire and Cheshire.

In 1847 Greenall was elected as Member of Parliament (MP) for Warrington, a seat he held until 1868, when he was unseated through an error of the Mayor's poll-clerk. In 1873 he was appointed High Sheriff of Cheshire and in 1874, he was reelected MP for Warrington. In 1876 he was created a Baronet, of Walton Hall in the County of Chester. He lost his seat at Warrington in 1880, but was re-elected in 1885 and remained until he retired at the 1892 general election.

Greenall married, firstly, Mary, daughter of David Claughton, in 1836. After her death in 1861 he married, secondly, Susannah, daughter of John Lovis Rapp. He died in July 1894, aged 88, and was succeeded in the baronetcy by his only son from his first marriage, Gilbert, who was created Baron Daresbury in 1927. Susannah, Lady Greenall, died in 1896.

== Coat of arms ==
Greenall's coat of arms has a shield of Or on a bend nebuly Vert three bugle horns stringed of the first and crest and mantle Upon a torse Or and vert, Upon a pomeis a bugle horn stringed Or between a vol of the last, the mantling vert doubled Or.

== Notes ==
Parliament of the United Kingdom
| Preceded by John Ireland Blackburne | Member of Parliament for Warrington; 1847–1868 | Succeeded by Peter Rylands |
| Preceded by Peter Rylands | Member of Parliament for Warrington; 1874–1880 | Succeeded by John Gordon McMinnies |
| Preceded by John Gordon McMinnies | Member of Parliament for Warrington; 1885–1892 | Succeeded by Robert Pierpont |
Honorary titles
| Preceded by Egerton Leigh | High Sheriff of Cheshire; 1873 | Succeeded by Edward Watkin |
Baronetage of the United Kingdom
| New title | Baronet (of Walton Hall); 1876–1894 | Succeeded by Gilbert Greenall |
