= 1963 St Marylebone by-election =

UK Parliamentary by-election

The 1963 St Marylebone by-election of 5 December 1963 was held after Conservative Member of Parliament (MP) Wavell Wakefield became a hereditary peer. Though there was a large swing against the government, the seat was retained for the Conservatives by Quintin Hogg, who had renounced his peerage in order to re-enter the House of Commons, in the hope of being chosen as party leader following the resignation of Harold Macmillan, and thereby becoming Prime Minister. Hogg went on to hold the seat in the 1966 and 1970 general elections. Like his predecessor, Hogg would leave the seat on being given a peerage; in this case a life peerage.

Forty years previously, the constituency had been represented by Hogg's father, Douglas Hogg.

== Result ==
St Marylebone by-election, 1963
Party	Candidate	Votes	%	±%
Conservative	Quintin Hogg	12,495	54.97	−9.53
Labour	Peter Plouviez	7,219	31.76	+8.19
Liberal	Michael Wheeler	3,016	13.27	+1.34
Majority		5,276	23.21	−17.70
Turnout		22,730		
Conservative hold		Swing		
