= Thomas Legh (died 1857) =

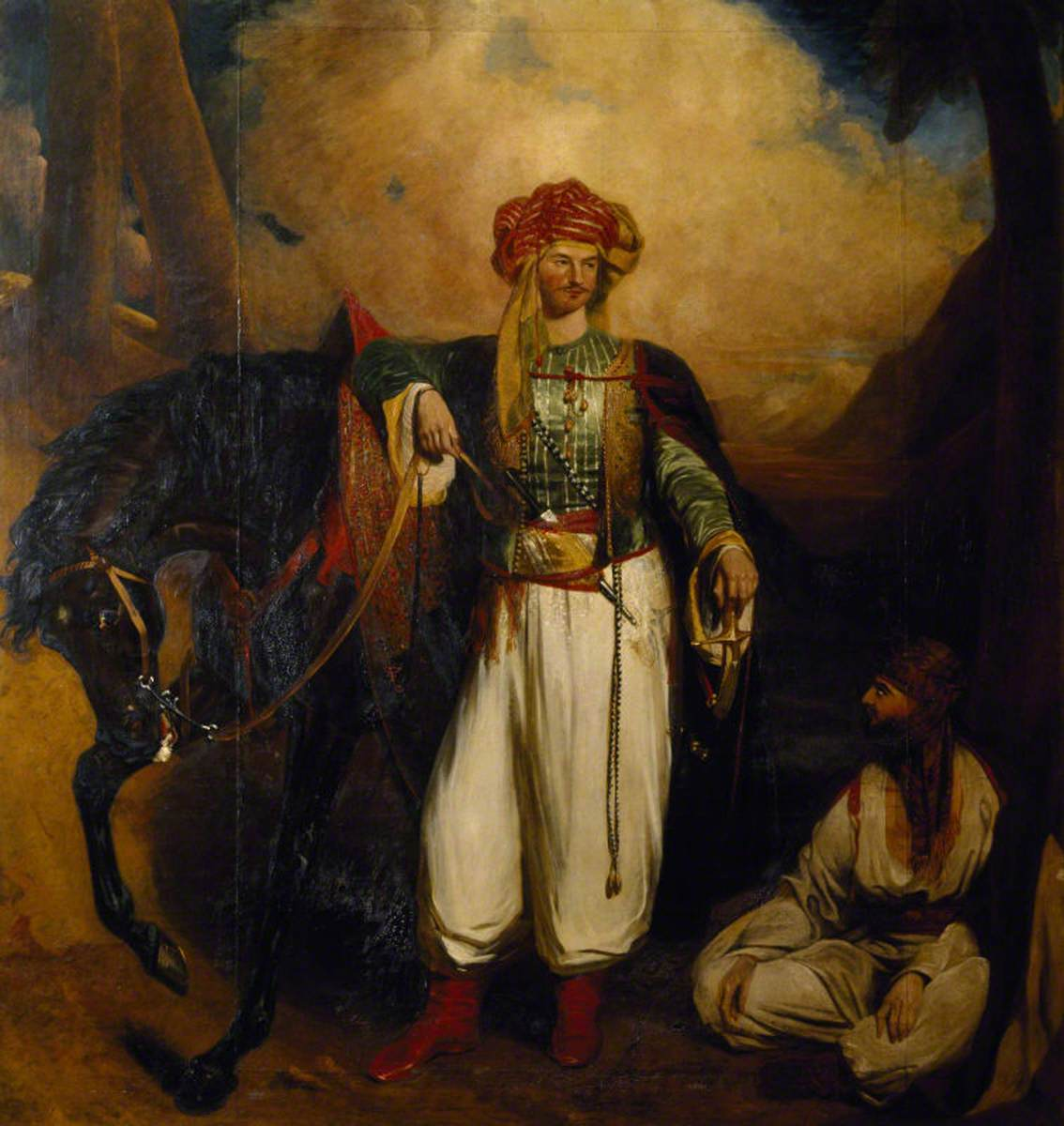
William Bradley (1801–1857) – Thomas Legh (1792–1857) – 499989 – National Trust

Thomas Legh FRS (c. 1793 – 8 May 1857) was a politician in England.

Born about 1793 he was the oldest illegitimate son and heir of Thomas Peter Legh. He was educated at Brasenose College, Oxford.

Thomas Legh travelled after leaving Oxford, he was in Egypt in 1812 and 1813 and published an account of his journey in 1816.

He was Member of Parliament (MP) for the rotten borough of Newton in Lancashire from 16 April 1814 (presumably this was the date he came of age), until the borough was disenfranchised at the 1832 general election.

He married twice, firstly on 14 January 1828 to Ellen Turner (who had previously been abducted at the age of 15). They had one son who predeceased his father and one daughter. Ellen died in childbirth in 1831. His second marriage on 3 October 1843 was to Maud Lowther; they had no children.

In 1830 he was one of the initial proprietors of the Wigan Branch Railway.

Thomas Legh made his nephew, William John Legh, his successor. William later became Baron Newton. Thomas Legh died on 8 May 1857.

== Notes ==
Parliament of the United Kingdom
Preceded by Peter Heron; John Ireland Blackburne	Member of Parliament for Newton; 1814 – 1832; With: John Ireland Blackburne to 1818; Thomas Claughton 1818–1825; Robert Townsend-Farquhar 1825–1826; Thomas Alcock 1826–1830; Thomas Houldsworth 1830–1832	Constituency abolished
