= Horace Farquhar, 1st Earl Farquhar =

British financier, courtier and Conservative politician

The Right Honourable The Earl Farquhar GCB GCVO PC DL
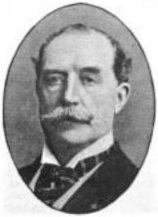
- In The Sketch, 4 March 1896

Lord Steward of the Household
- In office 9 June 1915 – 19 October 1922
- Monarch: George V
- Prime Minister: H. H. Asquith; David Lloyd George
- Preceded by: The Earl of Chesterfield
- Succeeded by: The Earl of Shaftesbury

Personal details
- Born: 19 May 1844 Goldings, near Hertford, Hertfordshire
- Died: 30 August 1923 (aged 79) Grosvenor Square, Mayfair, London
- Party: Conservative
- Spouse: Emily Packe (d. 1922)

Horace Brand Farquhar, 1st Earl Farquhar, GCB, GCVO, PC, DL (19 May 1844 – 30 August 1923) was a British financier, courtier, Conservative politician, and rogue.

== Background ==
Townsend-Farquhar was born at Goldings near Hertford, the fifth of six sons of Sir Minto Townsend-Farquhar, 2nd Baronet, by his wife Erica Mackay, the only (but illegitimate) daughter of Eric Mackay, 7th Lord Reay. He later adopted the surname of Farquhar only. From 14 August 1877, when Sir Robert Townsend-Farquhar, 6th Baronet, his elder brother, succeeded as sixth baronet, to his death he was heir presumptive to the baronetcy.

== Business career and marriage ==
The Farquhar family, though distinguished, were not rich, and Farquhar began his career as a clerk in a government office. However, he soon joined Forbes, Forbes and Co., a company involved in the trade with India, of which he rose to become manager. The Forbeses were family friends of the Farquhars, and introduced Farquhar to the circle of the Prince of Wales. Farquhar later left Forbes's to become a partner and large shareholder in Sir Samuel Scott, Bart. and Co., a private bank. At this time he befriended the immensely wealthy Lord Macduff, who succeeded as sixth Earl Fife in 1879, and with whom he may have had a sexual relationship. Farquhar persuaded him to sell much of his Scottish estates and invest the proceeds in Scott's bank. It was through Fife's influence that Farquhar became a member of the board of the British South Africa Company, despite the presence of a huge conflict of interests as Farquhar was also chairman and a substantial shareholder in the Exploration Company, supported by the Rothschilds which was seeking mining rights in land controlled by the BSAC. Farquhar, along with several others connected with the BSAC, was later obliged to resign after the Jameson Raid. By this time he had made for himself a considerable name in the City; he oversaw the merger of Scott's with Parrs Banking Company and joined the board of Parrs in 1894. On 5 January 1895 he married Emilie, daughter of Lieutenant-Colonel Henry Packe, Grenadier Guards, of Hurleston in Northamptonshire and Twyford Hall in Norfolk, and widow since 1883 of Sir Edward Henry Scott, 5th Baronet, of the banking family. This marriage brought him a fortune and a London home in Grosvenor Square. They had no children; Lady Farquhar died on 6 April 1922.

== Political career ==
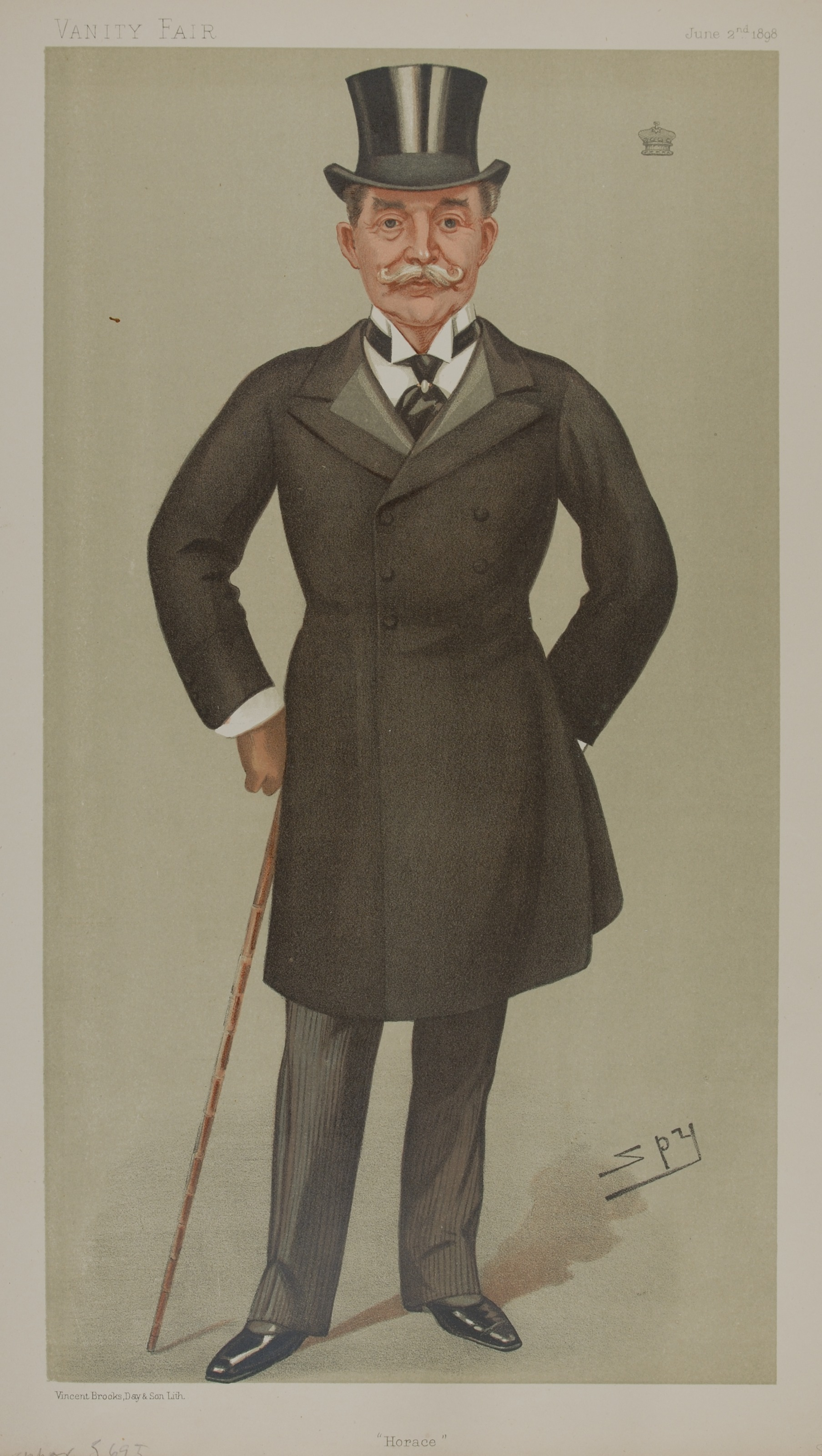
"Horace". Lord Farquhar as caricatured by Spy (Leslie Ward) in Vanity Fair, June 1898

In 1889, on the formation of the London County Council, Farquhar was elected to represent Marylebone on behalf of the Municipal Reform Party. He represented East Marylebone from 1899 until 1901, and West Marylebone from March to July 1901. On 25 October 1892 he was created a baronet, of Cavendish Square in the Parish of St Marylebone in the County of London, though he had hoped for a peerage. He also served as president of the London Municipal Society from 1894 until 1901. In the general election of 1895 he was elected as a Liberal Unionist Member of Parliament for Marylebone West, and sat until he was raised to the peerage as Baron Farquhar, of St Marylebone in the County of London, on 20 January 1898. His stepson Sir Samuel Scott was elected in his place. On 22 January 1901 Queen Victoria died, and was succeeded by Farquhar's friend, now Edward VII. Farquhar was appointed Master of the Household to the new monarch, a post he held until 1907. He then served as an extra Lord in Waiting to the King until the latter's death in 1910, and in the same capacity to his successor George V, until he was made Lord Steward of the Household in the coalition government of 1915. He remained in this post until the Conservatives brought an end to the coalition in 1922, being created Viscount Farquhar, of Saint Marylebone in the County of London, on 21 June 1917 and Earl Farquhar on 30 November 1922 in the Dissolution Honours List.

In addition to his baronetcy and peerages, Lord Farquhar was made a Knight Commander of the Royal Victorian Order on 28 May 1901, a Knight Grand Cross of the Royal Victorian Order on 9 November 1902, a Privy Counsellor on 2 November 1907, and a Knight Grand Cross of the Order of the Bath in 1922, as well as being a Grand Officer of the Legion of Honour. He was a Deputy Lieutenant and Justice of the Peace for Middlesex, and a member of the Marlborough and Turf Clubs.

In early 1923 he was sacked as Treasurer of the Conservative and Unionist Party by the leader Bonar Law. Farquhar had refused to pay some of the election expenses for the 1922 election, claiming that the money had been donated to the late coalition rather than to the Party. It seemed that he had given large sums of the money to the coalition leader David Lloyd George, whose trading in honours had prompted the Conservative rebellion.

== Death and character ==
Lord Farquhar died at his London home, 7 Grosvenor Square, on 30 August 1923, and was buried at Bromley Hill cemetery in Kent on 11 September following. He had no children, and all his titles became extinct. In his will he left many large legacies to his friends, including members of the Royal Family, but although his estate was assessed for probate at £400,000 the entire sum was taken up by debts, leaving nothing and revealing that Farquhar had been an undisclosed bankrupt.

Lord Farquhar's success in business as well as society has been attributed not only to his shrewdness with making money, but also to his ability to use his "physical charms" to get ahead. He was very generous with his hospitality at his London house and at Castle Rising, his country place in Norfolk, but nevertheless, and perhaps because of the wealth and honours he accumulated, he remained an unpopular figure.

Burke's Peerage describes him as "a cavalier financier and conduit for subscriptions to party political funds (both Conservative and Lloyd George Liberal) by aspirates to titles; as the full extent of his irregular business dealings became apparent after his death he was considered lucky to have escaped prosecution for fraud while alive."

Parliament of the United Kingdom
Preceded by Sir Frederick Seager Hunt	Member of Parliament for Marylebone West; 1895 – 1898	Succeeded by Sir Samuel Scott, Bt
Court offices
Preceded by Lord Edward Pelham-Clinton	Master of the Household; 1901–1907	Succeeded by Sir Charles Frederick
Political offices
Preceded by The Earl of Chesterfield	Lord Steward of the Household; 1915–1922	Succeeded by The Earl of Shaftesbury
Party political offices
New post	Treasurer of the Conservative and Unionist Party; 1911–1923	Succeeded by The Viscount Younger of Leckie
Peerage of the United Kingdom
New creation	Earl Farquhar; 1922–1923	Extinct
New creation	Viscount Farquhar; 1917–1923	Extinct
New creation	Baron Farquhar; 1898–1923	Extinct
Baronetage of the United Kingdom
New creation	Baronet (of White Lodge); 1892–1923	Extinct
Preceded by Muir baronets	Farquhar baronets of White Lodge; 25 October 1892	Succeeded by Hamilton baronets
