= Frederick Seager Hunt =

British politician and distiller

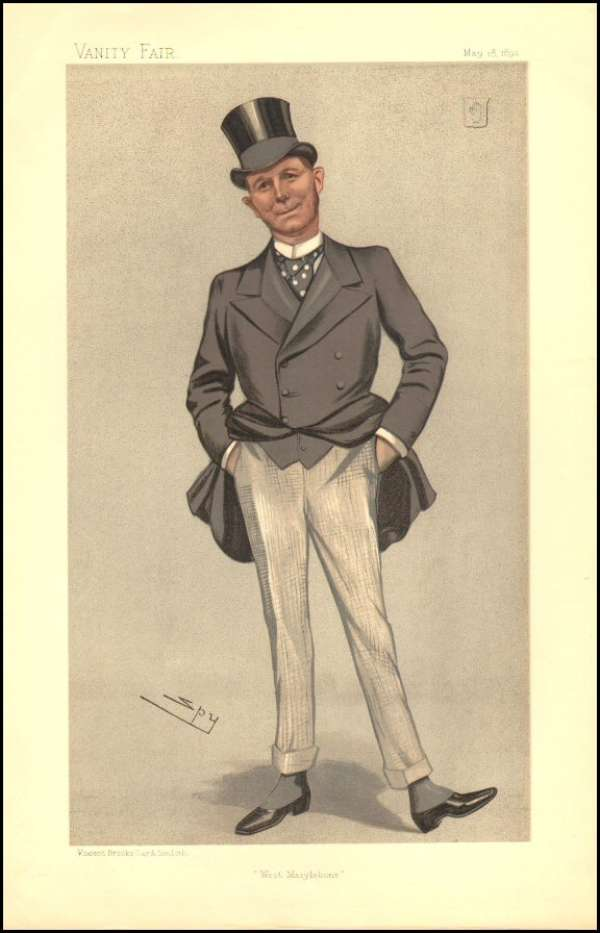
Caricature of Sir Frederick Seager Hunt drawn by Leslie Ward, appearing in Vanity Fair in May 1893.

Sir Frederick Seager Hunt, 1st Baronet (27 April 1838 – 21 January 1904) was a British Conservative Party politician, and a prominent distiller.

== Background and education ==
Hunt was born in Chippenham, Wiltshire, the second son of James Edward Hunt and Eliza Seager, eldest daughter of the distiller James Lys Seager. He attended school at St Peter's College, Westminster.

== Business career ==
Seager Evans and Co. was founded by Hunt's Grandfather James Lys Seager and William Evans. In 1864 Hunt became a partner, and in 1872 the prior partnership with Richard and Christopher Wilson was dissolved, leaving just Frederick and James as partners in the business. James Lys Seager died a year later, making Frederick the sole proprietor from then on. During the time Hunt was involved with the company, the distillery was sited at Millbank in London, although it later moved to Deptford, in the 1920s. Their most famous product was Seagers Gin.

== Political career ==
Hunt was elected at the 1885 general election as Member of Parliament (MP) for Marylebone West. He was re-elected in 1886 and 1892, but at the 1895 general election he stood instead in Maidstone, where he was returned unopposed. He resigned his seat in 1898 by becoming Steward of the Manor of Northstead. He was created a Baronet, of Cromwell Road in the parish of Saint Mary Abbots, Kensington, in the County of London, on 13 October 1892.

Hunt baronets
- Escutcheon of the Hunt Baronets of Cromwell Road
- Creation date: 1892
- Status: extinct
- Extinction date: 1904

== Sources ==
- National Archives Records for Seager Evans and Co. Ltd.
- 1841 Census, National Archives
- Vanity Fair, May 1893

Parliament of the United Kingdom
New constituency	Member of Parliament for Marylebone West; 1885 – 1895	Succeeded by Sir Horace Farquhar, Bt
Preceded by Fiennes Cornwallis	Member of Parliament for Maidstone; 1895 – 1898	Succeeded by Fiennes Cornwallis
Baronetage of the United Kingdom
New creation	Baronet (of Cromwell Road); 1892–1904	Extinct
Preceded by Jaffray baronets	Hunt baronets of Cromwell Road; 13 October 1892	Succeeded by Levy-Lawson baronets
