= Edward Porter (Labour politician) =

Edward Porter (28 July 1880 – 31 August 1960) was a British Labour Party politician and socialite.

Porter was elected at the 1945 general election as Member of Parliament (MP) for Warrington in Lancashire. The Constituency had changed hands between Labour and the Conservatives in the 1920s, but had been held since 1931 by the Conservative Noel Goldie. Porter won the seat with 63% of the votes, but sat in the House of Commons only until the 1950 general election, when he did not stand again.

Parliament of the United Kingdom
Preceded by Noel Goldie	Member of Parliament for Warrington; 1945 – 1950	Succeeded by Hyacinth Morgan
