= Dalton Hall, Cumbria =

Country House in Northern England

Coordinates: 54.1753°N 2.7112°W

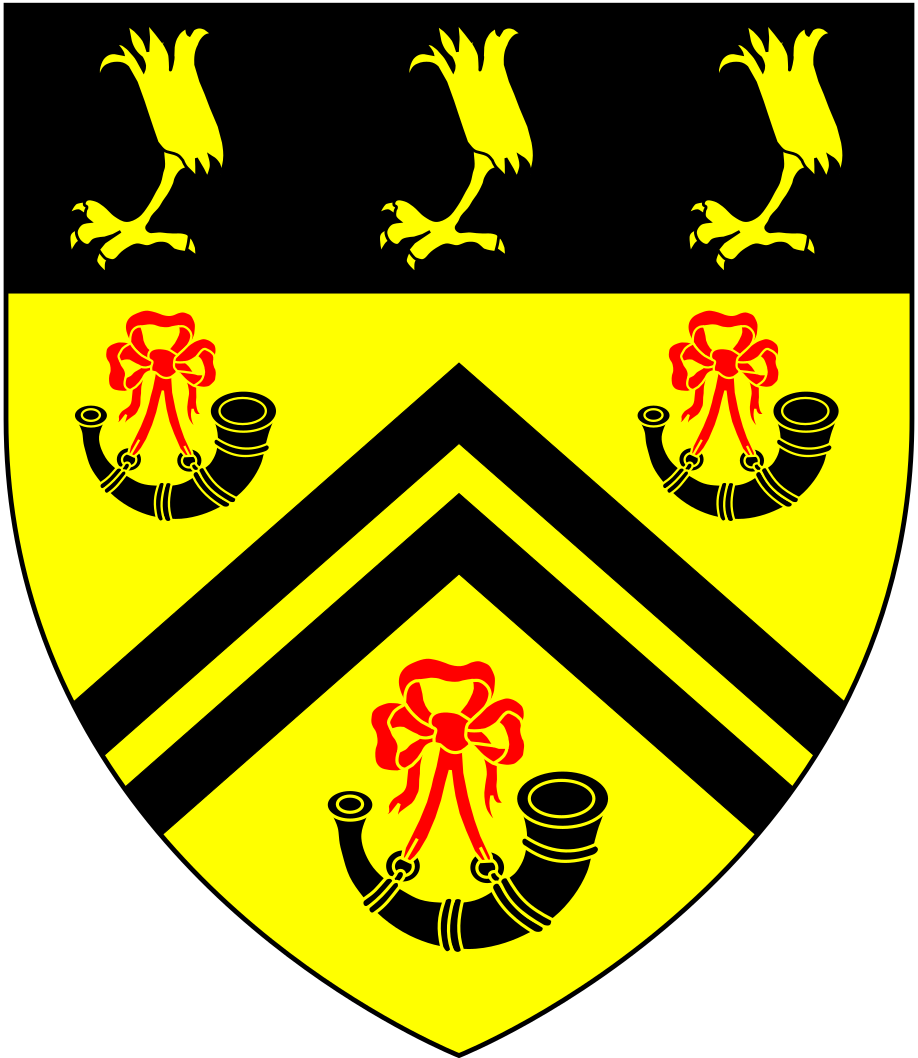
Arms of Hornby of Dalton Hall: Or, two chevronels between three bugle-horns sable stringed gules on a chief of the second as many eagle's legs erased of the first

Dalton Hall is a country house near Burton-in-Kendal in northern England. The hall lies within the county palatine of Lancaster, while Burton lies in the historic county of Westmorland. Both have formed part of Cumbria since 1974.

The hall has been in the ownership of the Hornby family since the late 18th century. Major additions were made to the large Georgian mansion in 1859–60 by Edmund Geoffrey Stanley Hornby (1839-1923), a Deputy Lieutenant for Lancashire, son and heir of Edmund Hornby (1773-1857), MP, to the designs of the Lancaster architect Edward Graham Paley. The building was demolished in 1968 and replaced in 1968–72 by a much smaller new house designed by Clough Williams-Ellis, his last commission. Pevsner described it as "a stately doll's house" which "sits inside the ghost of its predecessor". The outbuildings have been converted to serve a number of commercial purposes, including rental cottages, a self-storage facility, and the Dalton Hall Business Centre.

== Estate ==
In 2018 the Dalton Estate included three farms:

- Coat Green Farm – a tenanted mixed dairy farm.
- Dalton Old Hall – a tenanted mixed beef and sheep farm.
- Russell Farm – a tenanted farm.

In addition the estate owns the following 18 dwellings:

- Bell House – 4 bedroom detached house
- Crow Trees – 3 bedroom detached cottage
- Burton Lodge – 2 bedroom gate lodge
- Dalton Lodge – 2 bedroom gate lodge
- 3 Forestry Houses – 3 bedroom 1950's semi-detached
- 4 Forestry Houses – 3 bedroom 1950's semi-detached
- Home Farm – 3 bedroom house – AVAILABLE TO LET
- Keeper's Cottage – 3 bedroom detached cottage c/w barn
- 1 Park View 3 bedroom attached cottage
- 2 Park View – 4 bedroom attached cottage
- 1 Woodside Cottages – 3 bedroom 1960's semi-detached
- 2 Woodside Cottages – 3 bedroom 1960's semi-detached
- Old Post Office Flat, Kirkby Stephen – 2 bedroom apartment

== Hornby family ==
prominent members of the Hornby family include:

- Edmund Hornby (1773-1857), MP, whose mother was a daughter of James Smith-Stanley, Lord Strange (1716–1771), (son and heir apparent of Edward Stanley, 11th Earl of Derby (1689-1776) of Knowsley Hall in Lancashire) and a sister of Edward Smith-Stanley, 12th Earl of Derby (1752-1834). He himself married his first cousin Lady Charlotte Stanley (d.1805), a daughter of the 12th Earl of Derby. Edmund Hornby's nephew was thus Edward Smith-Stanley, 14th Earl of Derby (1799-1869), thrice Prime Minister of the United Kingdom (1852, 1858–9, 1866-8).
- Admiral Sir Phipps Hornby (1785-1867), younger brother of Edmund Hornby (1773-1857).

== See also ==
- List of non-ecclesiastical works by E. G. Paley
- List of works by Clough Williams-Ellis
