= 1970 St Marylebone by-election =

UK parliamentary by-election

| ← June 1970 | 22 October 1970 | Feb. 1974 → |

Constituency of St Marylebone (UK Parliament constituency)
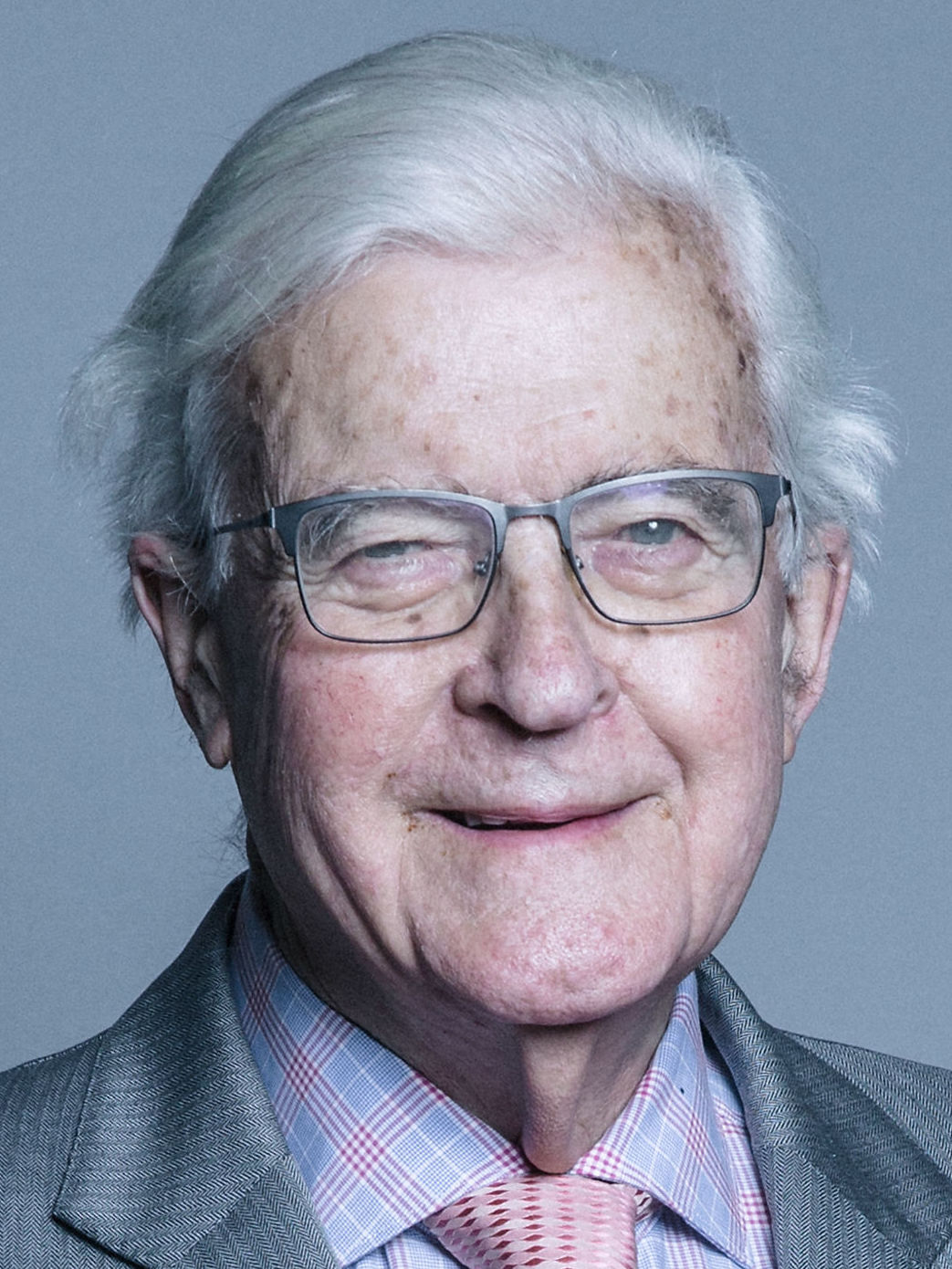
| | First party | Second party | Third party |
|---|---|---|---|
| | | Lab | Lib |
| Candidate | Kenneth Baker | Keith Morrell | Michael Vann |
| Party | Conservative | Labour | Liberal |
| Popular vote | 10,684 | 4,542 | 1,038 |
| Percentage | 63.49% | 26.99% | 6.19% |
| Swing | ▲1.40% | ▼2.32% | ▼2.41% |
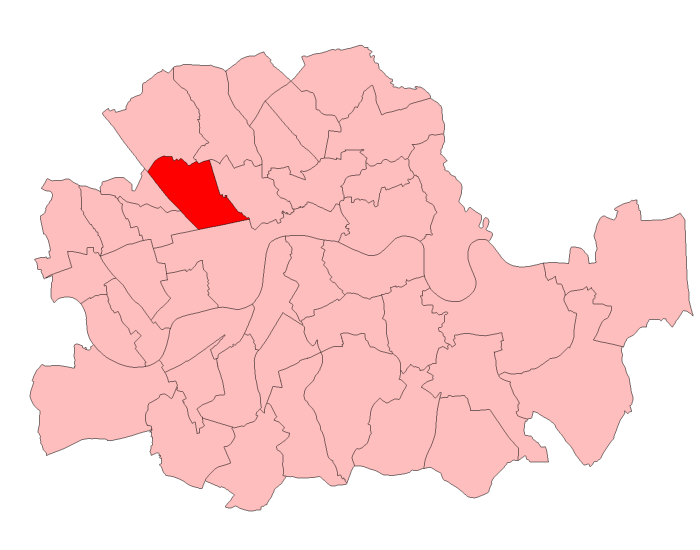
- A map of parliamentary constituencies within the County of London at the time of the by-election, with St Marylebone highlighted in red.
MP before election
Quintin Hogg
Conservative
Subsequent MP
Kenneth Baker
Conservative

The 1970 St Marylebone by-election of 22 October 1970 was held after Conservative Member of Parliament (MP) Quintin Hogg became a life peer. The seat was retained for the Conservatives by Kenneth Baker, who had lost his previous seat of Acton at the general election four months earlier; Baker would go on to represent the Mole Valley seat in Surrey and become a long-serving Cabinet minister.

== Result ==
St Marylebone by-Election, 1970
| Party | Candidate | Votes | % | ±% |
|---|---|---|---|---|
| Conservative | Kenneth Baker | 10,684 | 63.49 | +1.40 |
| Labour | Keith Morrell | 4,542 | 26.99 | −2.32 |
| Liberal | Michael Vann | 1,038 | 6.19 | −2.41 |
| National Front | Malcolm Skeggs | 401 | 2.38 | New |
| Fourth World Group | John Papworth | 163 | 0.97 | New |
| Majority | | 6,142 | 36.50 | +3.7 |
| Turnout | | 16,828 | | |
| Conservative hold | | Swing | | |
