= Robert Pierpoint (British politician) =

British politician

Pierpoint in 1895.

Robert Pierpoint (8 June 1845 – 22 January 1932) was a British lawyer and politician. He was member of parliament for Warrington from 1892 to 1906.

The eldest son of Benjamin Pierpoint, Robert Pierpoint was born at Warrington in 1845. He was educated at Eton College and Christ Church, Oxford, graduating from the university in 1869 and being awarded an MA in 1871. He was called to the bar at the Inner Temple in London and later became a justice of the peace.

He married Marie Eugénie, a widow, at the old Church of the Annunciation, Bryanston street on 17 December 1902.

Parliament of the United Kingdom
Preceded by Sir Gilbert Greenall, 1st Baronet	Member of Parliament for Warrington; 1892–1906	Succeeded by Sir Arthur Crosfield, 1st Baronet
