= Philip Morton (cricketer) =

English cricketer and schoolmaster

Personal information
- Full name: Philip Howard Morton
- Born: 20 June 1857; Tatterford, Norfolk, England
- Died: 13 May 1925 (aged 67); Bournemouth, England
- Batting: Right-handed
- Bowling: Right-arm fast

Domestic team information
- Years: Team
- 1878–1880: Cambridge University
- 1880–1882: Gentlemen
- 1884: Surrey
- Source: CricketArchive

Philip Howard Morton (20 June 1857 – 13 May 1925) was an English cricketer and schoolmaster.

He played for Cambridge, the Gentlemen, Surrey, and Norfolk. In the heyday of his teaching career, he was head master of the fashionable prep school Wixenford from 1903 to 1918.

== Life ==
The second son of the Rev. E. H. Morton, and the younger brother of another first-class cricketer, C. H. Morton, the young Morton was educated at Rossall School and Trinity College, Cambridge. A right-arm fast bowler, he was a member of the famous Cambridge University team of 1878 which included A. P. Lucas, Alfred Lyttelton and his brother Edward, and A. G. Steel.

After Cambridge, Morton played for Surrey and the Gentlemen of England, and he retired from first-class cricket in 1886. He also played for Norfolk.

His career was as a schoolmaster, and he taught at Elstree School from 1880 to 1889, then was Head Master of Bracewell Hall, Skipton, from 1889 to 1896, of Scaitcliffe School, Englefield Green, from 1896 to 1903, and finally of Wixenford School, Wokingham, from 1903 to 1918.

He died on 15 May 1925 at Bournemouth, after an operation.
