= Noel Goldie =

British judge and Conservative Party politician

Sir Noel Goldie
- Born: Noel Barré Goldie; 26 December 1882; Liverpool, England
- Died: 4 June 1964 (aged 81); Folkestone, Kent, England
- Education: Rugby School; Trinity College, Cambridge
- Occupations: Judge and politician
- Known for: Recorder of Manchester
- Political party: Conservative

Sir Noel Barré Goldie KC (26 December 1882 – 4 June 1964) was a British judge and Conservative Party politician.

He was educated at Rugby School and Trinity College, Cambridge, qualifying Bachelor of Law in 1905.

== Judicial career ==
He worked in chambers until the outbreak of the First World War, when he fought in Belgium and France as a Staff Captain in the Royal Artillery. He resumed his career after the war and took silk in 1928. He was made a Bencher in 1935 and a Reader in 1958.

The following year he was appointed Recorder of Burnley, a position he held until he was appointed Recorder of Manchester in 1935, a position he filled until 1956.

== Parliamentary career ==
At the 1929 general election, Goldie stood as the Conservative candidate for the borough of Warrington in Lancashire, defending the seat vacated by Alec Cunningham-Reid, who was standing instead in Southampton. However, in a three-way contest, Goldie was defeated by Charles Dukes, the borough's former Labour Party MP who regained the seat with over 50% of the votes.

At the next general election, in 1931, the governing Labour Party was split, and its leader Ramsay MacDonald (Prime Minister since 1929) having broken with his party to form a First National Government 1931 with Conservative support. Labour lost most of its seats, including Warrington, where Goldie took 56.2% of the votes in a two-contest with Dukes.

Goldie was returned again to the House of Commons at the 1935 general election, and held the seat until his defeat in the Labour landslide at the 1945 general election. He was the last Conservative MP for the Warrington constituency, which thereafter returned Labour MPs until its abolition in 1983.

He was knighted in the King's Birthday Honours in June 1945.

Parliament of the United Kingdom
Preceded by Charles Dukes	Member of Parliament for Warrington; 1931 – 1945	Succeeded by Edward Porter
