= Cyril Moses Picciotto =

Cyril Moses Picciotto KC (1888 – 9 February 1940), was a British barrister, writer and Liberal Party politician active in Jewish affairs.

== Background ==
Picciotto was born in London, the eldest son of James Picciotto, a Syrian Jew, and Mary Benoliel. He was educated at St Paul's School, London and Trinity College, Cambridge. He was awarded the Members’ Prize for Latin Essay in 1909, a First Class Classical Tripos in 1910, a First Class Law Tripos in 1911 and a Whewell Scholar in 1912. In 1915 he married Elaine Elizabeth Solomon. They had two sons.

== Professional career ==
Picciotto was called to the Bar by the Inner Temple in 1913. He worked on the North Eastern Circuit. He was in the Military Department of the India Office from 1915 to 1919. He was Referee, under Widows’ Orphans’ and Old Age Contributory Pensions Acts from 1930 to 1932. He became a King's Council in 1938.

As a writer, his publications included;

- Via Mystica (Essays), 1912
- The Relation of International Law to the Law of England and the United States, 1914
- St Paul's School, 1939
- The Legal Position of the Jews in England as shown in the Plea Rolls of the Jewish Exchequer (in Transactions of the Jewish Historical Society of England)

== Jewish affairs ==
He was a member of the Council of the Jewish Historical Society of England. In 1939 he was appointed to the Spanish and Portuguese Congregation's representative on the Board of Deputies. He was Chairman of the London Area Council for Combating Anti-Semitism.

== Political career ==
Picciotto was Liberal candidate for the St Marylebone division at the 1929 General Election. He finished third. He did not stand for parliament again.

=== Electoral record ===
General Election 1929: St Marylebone
Party	Candidate	Votes	%	±%
Unionist	Rennell Rodd	26,247	61.4	+5.3
Labour	David Amyas Ross	10,960	25.7	−3.7
Liberal	Cyril Picciotto	5,520	12.9	−1.6
Majority		15,287	35.7	+9.0
Turnout			57.3	+14.2
Unionist hold		Swing	+4.5	
