= John Ireland Blackburne (1783–1874) =

British politician

John Ireland Blackburne (26 May 1783 – 27 January 1874) was a British Conservative politician.

Born at Hale Hall, Lancashire, he was the son of John Blackburne, lord of the manor of Hale and Member of Parliament for Lancashire, and his wife Anne née Robard of Shepton Mallet, Somerset. He was descended from two old Lancashire families, the Irelands and the Blackburnes.

He was elected to the House of Commons in 1807, sitting as MP for Newton until 1818. He subsequently became involved in the politics of the town of Warrington, helping to establish the Warrington Operative Conservative Association. Such associations were established in the north west of England in order to enlist the support of working class men against the emerging Radical and Chartist movements.

He returned to Parliament at the 1835 general election when he won the parliamentary borough of Warrington from the Liberal Party. He sat as the town's MP until he retired in 1847. He was a strong defender of the established church, and was opposed to the endowment of Roman Catholic priests and the appropriation of church property for secular purposes. He also supported the improvement of working conditions, in particular the Factories Act 1847.

Blackburne married his cousin, Anne Bamford. Their son, also named John Ireland Blackburne, was also a member of parliament from 1875 – 1885.

Parliament of the United Kingdom
Preceded by Peter Heron; Thomas Brooke	Member of Parliament for Newton; 1807–1818; With: Peter Heron 1806–1814; Thomas Legh 1814–1818	Succeeded by Thomas Legh; Thomas Claughton
Preceded by William Edmund George Hornby	Member of Parliament for Warrington; 1835–1847	Succeeded by Gilbert Greenall
