= St Marylebone (UK Parliament constituency) =

Parliamentary constituency in the United Kingdom, 1918-1983

- Former borough constituency for the House of Commons

1918–1983
- Seats: one
- Created from: Marylebone East and Marylebone West
- Replaced by: Westminster North and City of London and Westminster South

St Marylebone was a parliamentary constituency centred on the Marylebone district of Central London. It returned one Member of Parliament (MP) to the House of Commons of the Parliament of the United Kingdom.

It was created for the 1918 general election, and abolished for the 1983 general election.

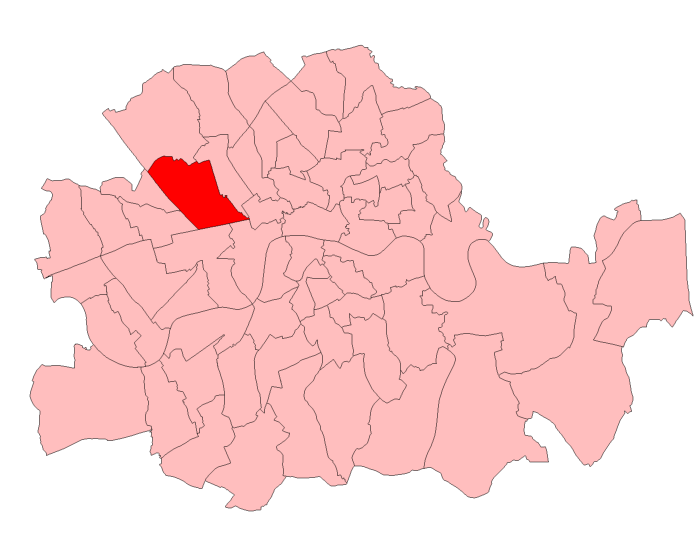
St Marylebone in London 1918–1950

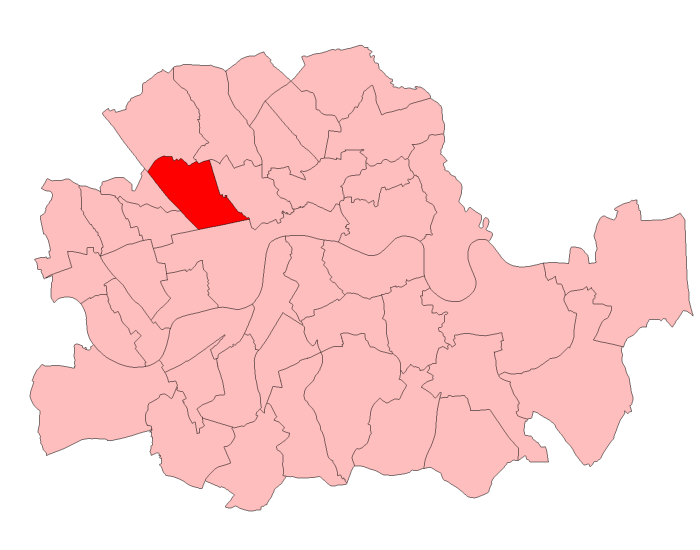
St Marylebone in London 1950–1974

== Boundaries ==

=== Statutory description ===
Final approximate outline of this seat. Click for surrounding seats. (Colouring: Feb 1974 results)

1918–1950: The Metropolitan Borough of St Marylebone wards of Bryanston Square, Cavendish, Church Street, Dorset Square and Regent's Park, Hamilton Terrace, Langham, Park Crescent, Portman, and St John's Wood Terrace.

1950–1974: The Metropolitan Borough of St Marylebone wards of Bell Street, Bryanston Square, Cavendish Square, Church Street, Dorset Square, Hamilton Terrace, Lord's, Park Crescent, Portman Square, and St John's Wood Terrace.

1974–1983: The City of Westminster wards of Baker Street, Cavendish, Church Street, Lord's, and Regent's Park.

=== No substantive change ===
As shown by the maps, inset, there was no change in substance to the outer ward boundaries of this constituency during its lifetime.

== Members of Parliament ==
Year	Member	Party
1918	Sir Samuel Scott	Unionist
1922	Sir Douglas Hogg	Unionist
1928	Sir Rennell Rodd	Unionist
1932	Alec Cunningham-Reid	Conservative
1945	Sir Wavell Wakefield	Conservative
1963	Quintin Hogg	Conservative
1970	Kenneth Baker	Conservative
1983	constituency abolished	

== Elections ==
=== Elections in the 1910s ===
General election 1918: St Marylebone
Party		Candidate	Votes	%	±%
C	Unionist	Samuel Scott	Unopposed		
	Unionist win (new seat)				
C indicates candidate endorsed by the coalition government.

=== Elections in the 1920s ===
General election 1922: St Marylebone
Party	Candidate	Votes	%	±%
Unionist	Douglas Hogg	Unopposed		
Unionist hold				

General election 1923: St Marylebone
Party	Candidate	Votes	%	±%
Unionist	Douglas Hogg	16,763	66.6	N/A
Labour	James Jonas Dodd	8,424	33.4	New
Majority		8,339	33.2	N/A
Turnout		25,187	52.5	N/A
Unionist hold		Swing	N/A	

General election 1924: St Marylebone
Party	Candidate	Votes	%	±%
Unionist	Douglas Hogg	24,359	73.5	+6.9
Labour	George Edward Elmer	8,782	26.5	−6.9
Majority		8,339	47.0	+13.8
Turnout		33,141	65.5	+13.0
Unionist hold		Swing	+6.9	

1928 St Marylebone by-election
Party	Candidate	Votes	%	±%
Unionist	Rennell Rodd	12,859	56.1	−17.4
Labour	David Amyas Ross	6,721	29.4	+2.9
Liberal	Basil Murray	3,318	14.5	New
Majority		6,138	26.7	−20.3
Turnout		22,898	43.1	−22.4
Unionist hold		Swing	-10.1	

General election 1929: St Marylebone
Party	Candidate	Votes	%	±%
Unionist	Rennell Rodd	26,247	61.4	−12.1
Labour	David Amyas Ross	10,960	25.7	−0.8
Liberal	Cyril Picciotto	5,520	12.9	N/A
Majority		15,287	35.7	−11.3
Turnout		42,727	57.3	−8.2
Unionist hold		Swing	-4.5	

=== Elections in the 1930s ===
General election 1931: St Marylebone
Party	Candidate	Votes	%	±%
Conservative	Rennell Rodd	39,976	86.7	+25.3
Labour	Ernest Whitfield	6,147	13.3	−12.4
Majority		33,829	73.4	+36.7
Turnout		46,123	63.5	+6.2
Conservative hold		Swing	+18.3	

1932 St Marylebone by-election
Party	Candidate	Votes	%	±%
Conservative	Alec Cunningham-Reid	11,677	52.3	−34.4
Ind. Conservative	Basil Blackett	10,664	47.7	New
Majority		1,013	4.6	−68.8
Turnout		22,341	30.8	−32.7
Conservative hold		Swing		

General election 1935: St Marylebone
Party	Candidate	Votes	%	±%
Conservative	Alec Cunningham-Reid	31,183	79.6	−7.1
Labour	Elizabeth Jacobs	8,008	20.4	New
Majority		23,175	59.2	−14.2
Turnout		39,271	57.9	−5.6
Conservative hold		Swing		

=== Elections in the 1940s ===
General Election 1939–40

Another General Election was required to take place before the end of 1940. The political parties had been making preparations for an election to take place and by the Autumn of 1939, the following candidates had been selected;

- Conservative: Alec Cunningham-Reid
- Labour: Elizabeth Jacobs

General election 1945: St Marylebone
Party	Candidate	Votes	%	±%
Conservative	Wavell Wakefield	15,891	47.9	−31.7
Labour	Elizabeth Jacobs	10,740	32.4	+12.0
Ind. Conservative	Alec Cunningham-Reid	3,824	11.5	New
Liberal	Thomas Lodge	2,711	8.2	New
Majority		5,151	15.5	−43.7
Turnout		33,166	68.3	+10.4
Conservative hold		Swing		

=== Elections in the 1950s ===
General election 1950: St Marylebone
Party	Candidate	Votes	%	±%
Conservative	Wavell Wakefield	26,310	60.7	+12.8
Labour	John Silkin	12,890	29.7	−2.7
Liberal	Bjorn Guy	4,149	9.6	+1.4
Majority		13,420	31.0	N/A
Turnout		43,349	75.2	+6.9
Conservative hold		Swing		

General election 1951: St Marylebone
Party	Candidate	Votes	%	±%
Conservative	Wavell Wakefield	28,783	67.3	+6.6
Labour	William Balfour	13,964	32.7	+3.0
Majority		14,819	34.6	+3.6
Turnout		42,747	70.3	−4.9
Conservative hold		Swing	+1.8	

General election 1955: St Marylebone
Party	Candidate	Votes	%	±%
Conservative	Wavell Wakefield	26,302	70.7	+3.4
Labour	Ivan Michael Yates	10,903	29.3	−3.4
Majority		15,399	41.4	+6.8
Turnout		37,205	64.5	−5.8
Conservative hold		Swing	+3.4	

General election 1959: St Marylebone
Party	Candidate	Votes	%	±%
Conservative	Wavell Wakefield	23,278	64.5	−6.2
Labour	Benjamin Hooberman	8,507	23.6	−5.7
Liberal	Edwin Michael Wheeler	4,304	11.9	New
Majority		14,771	40.9	−0.5
Turnout		36,089	65.5	+1.0
Conservative hold		Swing	-0.2	

=== Elections in the 1960s ===
1963 St Marylebone by-election
Party	Candidate	Votes	%	±%
Conservative	Quintin Hogg	12,495	54.97	−9.53
Labour	Peter William Plouviez	7,219	31.76	+8.19
Liberal	Edwin Michael Wheeler	3,016	13.27	+1.34
Majority		5,276	23.21	−17.7
Turnout		22,730		
Conservative hold		Swing		

General election 1964: St Marylebone
Party	Candidate	Votes	%	±%
Conservative	Quintin Hogg	18,117	56.23	
Labour	Peter William Plouviez	9,324	28.94	
Liberal	Arthur William R. Capel	4,776	14.82	
Majority		8,793	27.29	
Turnout		32,217	64.43	
Conservative hold		Swing		

General election 1966: St Marylebone
Party	Candidate	Votes	%	±%
Conservative	Quintin Hogg	17,443	56.67	
Labour	Cyril Cooper	9,382	30.48	
Liberal	Arthur William R. Capel	3,258	10.58	
Anti Common Market	Christopher Newman Frere-Smith	445	1.45	New
Independent	Evan Jeremy Miller	252	0.82	New
Majority		8,061	26.19	
Turnout		30,780	65.08	
Conservative hold		Swing		

=== Elections in the 1970s ===
General election 1970: St Marylebone
Party	Candidate	Votes	%	±%
Conservative	Quintin Hogg	17,639	62.1	+4.4
Labour	Keith W. Morrell	8,325	29.3	−1.2
Liberal	Michael B.J. Vann	2,443	8.6	−2.0
Majority		9,314	32.8	+6.6
Turnout		28,407	59.6	−5.5
Conservative hold		Swing		

1970 St Marylebone by-election
Party	Candidate	Votes	%	±%
Conservative	Kenneth Baker	10,684	63.49	+1.40
Labour	Keith W. Morrell	4,542	26.99	−2.32
Liberal	Michael B.J. Vann	1,038	6.19	−2.41
National Front	Malcolm Skeggs	401	2.38	New
Fourth World Group	John Papworth	163	0.97	New
Majority		6,142	36.50	+3.7
Turnout		16,828		
Conservative hold		Swing		

General election February 1974: St Marylebone
Party	Candidate	Votes	%	±%
Conservative	Kenneth Baker	15,683	54.6	−7.5
Labour	J Merriton	6,996	24.3	−5.0
Liberal	Bernard Silver	5,599	19.5	+10.9
Independent Powellite	W Davies	470	1.6	New
Majority		8,717	30.3	−2.3
Turnout		28,748	66.1	+6.5
Conservative hold		Swing		

General election October 1974: St Marylebone
Party	Candidate	Votes	%	±%
Conservative	Kenneth Baker	13,660	54.9	+0.3
Labour	Patricia Moberly	7,157	28.8	+4.5
Liberal	Bernard Silver	4,067	16.3	−3.2
Majority		6,503	26.1	−4.2
Turnout		24,884	57.1	−9.0
Conservative hold		Swing	-2.1	

General election 1979: St Marylebone
Party	Candidate	Votes	%	±%
Conservative	Kenneth Baker	14,899	59.9	+5.0
Labour	Joseph Hegarty	6,586	26.5	−2.3
Liberal	Edward Mann	2,459	9.9	−6.4
Ecology	Jonathon Porritt	691	2.8	New
National Front	Charles Elrick	239	1.0	New
Majority		8,313	33.4	+7.3
Turnout		24,874		
Conservative hold		Swing		
