= Hunt baronets =

Set index for Hunt baronets

There have been two baronetcies created for persons with the surname Hunt, one in the Baronetage of Ireland and one in the Baronetage of the United Kingdom. Both creations are extinct.

- Hunt, later de Vere baronets, of Curragh (1784): see De Vere baronets
- Hunt baronets of Cromwell Road (1892): see Sir Frederick Seager Hunt, 1st Baronet (1838–1904)
