= Sir Samuel Scott, 6th Baronet =

British politician (1873–1943)

Sir Samuel Edward Scott, 6th Baronet (25 October 1873 – 21 February 1943) was a British Conservative Party politician.

== Political career ==
He was elected unopposed as Member of Parliament (MP) for the Marylebone West at a by-election in February 1898 after his predecessor (and stepfather) Sir Horace Farquhar was elevated to the peerage as Baron Farquhar. He held the seat for over 20 years until the constituency was abolished at the 1918 general election.

He was then elected unopposed as the Coalition Conservative MP for the new St Marylebone constituency. He retired from politics at the 1922 general election.

In April 1901 he was appointed an Assistant Private Secretary (unpaid) to Lord Stanley, Financial Secretary to the War Office.

== Military career ==
Scott was a Lieutenant in the Royal Horse Guards. He resigned from his commission, and was appointed a second-lieutenant in the West Kent Yeomanry (Queen's Own) on 24 February 1897. Following the outbreak of the Second Boer War, he volunteered for active service with the Imperial Yeomanry, and was on 10 February 1900 appointed a lieutenant in the 11th Battalion. While seconded, he was promoted to a lieutenant in the West Kent Yeomanry on 2 August 1902.

Parliament of the United Kingdom
Preceded by Sir Horace Farquhar	Member of Parliament for Marylebone West; 1898 – 1918	Constituency abolished
New constituency	Member of Parliament for St Marylebone; 1918 – 1922	Succeeded by Sir Douglas Hogg
Preceded by William Wentworth-Fitzwilliam	Baby of the House; February–July 1898	Succeeded by Arthur Hill
Baronetage of the United Kingdom
Preceded by Edward Henry Scott	Baronet (of Lytchet Minster); 1883–1943	Succeeded by Robert Claude Scott
