= Marylebone West =

Parliamentary constituency in the United Kingdom, 1885–1918

- Former borough constituency for the House of Commons
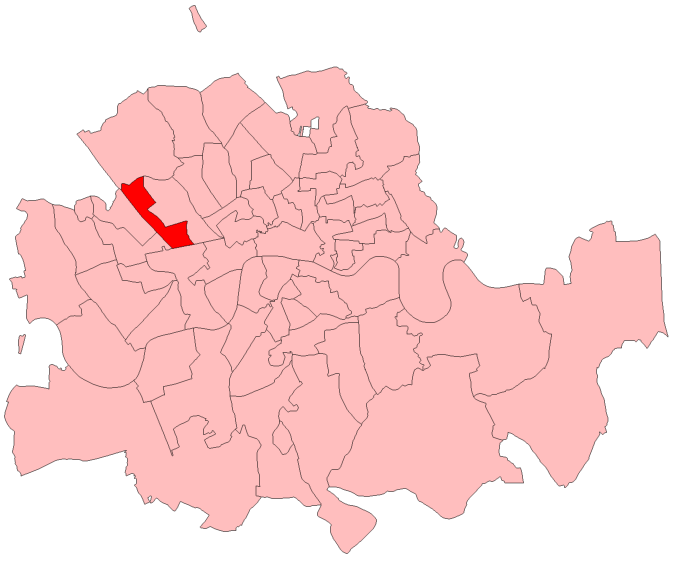
- Marylebone West in London

1885–1918
- Seats: one
- Created from: Marylebone
- Replaced by: St Marylebone

Marylebone West was a borough constituency located in the Metropolitan Borough of St Marylebone, in London. It returned one Member of Parliament (MP) to the House of Commons of the Parliament of the United Kingdom, elected by the first past the post voting system.

The constituency was created under the Redistribution of Seats Act 1885, and was formerly part of the two-seat Marylebone constituency. It was abolished for the 1918 general election.

== Boundaries ==
The previous Parliamentary borough of Marylebone was split up in the boundary review of 1884–85. The new Parliamentary borough consisted of the parish of St Marylebone, and therefore had identical boundaries to the St Marylebone Vestry which was the main institution of local government. The Commissioners divided the parish into two Divisions, each of which contained four of the parishes' eight wards. Marylebone West division was defined as containing the Bryanston, Hamilton Terrace, New Church Street, and Portman wards. The population in 1881 was 83,871.

== Members of Parliament ==
Year	Member	Party
1885	Frederick Hunt	Conservative
1895	Sir Horace Farquhar	Liberal Unionist
1898	Sir Samuel Scott	Conservative
1918	constituency abolished	

== Election results ==
=== Elections in the 1880s ===
General election 1885: Marylebone West
Party	Candidate	Votes	%	±%
Conservative	Frederick Seager Hunt	3,093	56.3	
Independent Liberal	Henry Seymour Trower	1,595	29.1	
Liberal	Henry Edmund Knight	701	12.8	
Independent	Joseph Diggle	101	1.8	
Majority		1,498	27.2	
Turnout		5,490	72.6	
Registered electors		7,566		
Conservative win (new seat)				

Diggle stood in order to test the eligibility of Church of England clergyman to stand as candidates, but if he had won he would have been disqualified from sitting in the Commons.

General election 1886: Marylebone West
Party	Candidate	Votes	%	±%
Conservative	Frederick Seager Hunt	3,064	61.2	+4.9
Liberal	Henry Seymour Trower	1,942	38.8	+26.0
Majority		1,122	22.4	−4.8
Turnout		5,006	66.2	−6.4
Registered electors		7,566		
Conservative hold		Swing	-10.6	

=== Elections in the 1890s ===
General election 1892: Marylebone West
Party	Candidate	Votes	%	±%
Conservative	Frederick Seager Hunt	2,913	54.1	−7.1
Liberal	John Charles Foulger	2,476	45.9	+7.1
Majority		437	8.2	−14.2
Turnout		5,389	66.9	+0.7
Registered electors		8,052		
Conservative hold		Swing	-7.1	

Straus

General election 1895: Marylebone West
Party	Candidate	Votes	%	±%
Liberal Unionist	Horace Townsend-Farquhar	3,734	62.2	+8.1
Liberal	Bertram Straus	2,273	37.8	−8.1
Majority		1,461	24.4	+16.2
Turnout		6,007	69.9	+3.0
Registered electors		8,593		
Liberal Unionist hold		Swing	+8.1	

Townsend-Farquhar was elevated to the peerage.

1898 Marylebone West by-election
Party	Candidate	Votes	%	±%
Conservative	Samuel Scott	Unopposed		
Conservative hold				

=== Elections in the 1900s ===
General election 1900: Marylebone West
Party	Candidate	Votes	%	±%
Conservative	Samuel Scott	3,487	69.5	+7.3
Liberal	William Hastings Sands	1,532	30.5	−7.3
Majority		1,955	39.0	+14.6
Turnout		5,019	57.1	−12.8
Registered electors		8,792		
Conservative hold		Swing	+7.3	

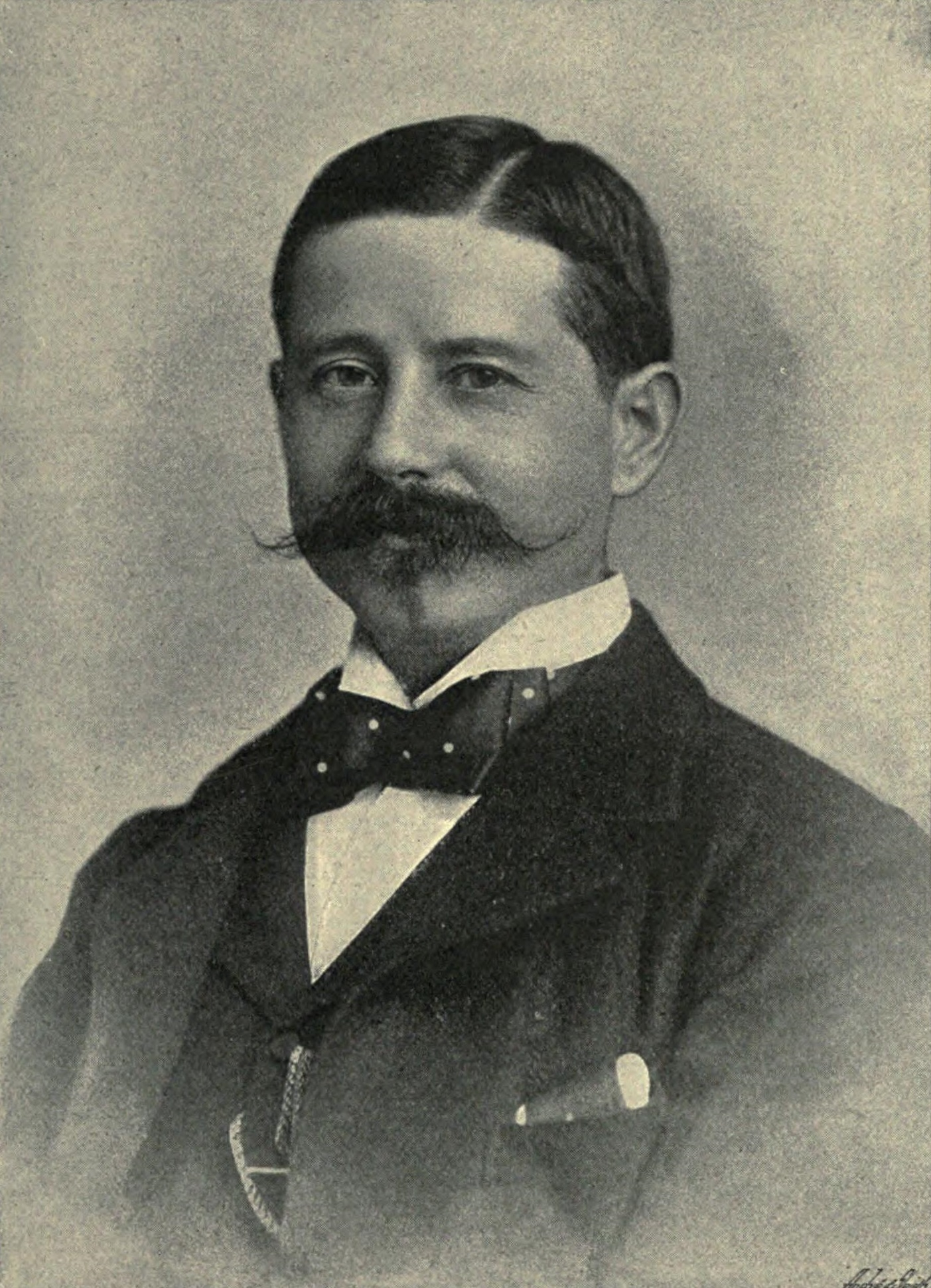
Johnston

General election 1906: Marylebone West
Party	Candidate	Votes	%	±%
Conservative	Samuel Scott	3,446	55.3	−14.2
Liberal	Henry Hamilton Johnston	2,791	44.7	+14.2
Majority		655	10.6	−28.4
Turnout		6,237	74.6	+17.5
Registered electors		8,365		
Conservative hold		Swing	-14.2	

=== Elections in the 1910s ===
General election January 1910: Marylebone West
Party	Candidate	Votes	%	±%
Conservative	Samuel Scott	4,451	64.3	+9.0
Liberal	Donald Alexander Forbes	2,474	35.7	−9.0
Majority		1,977	28.6	+18.0
Turnout		6,925	80.7	+6.1
Conservative hold		Swing	+9.0	

General election December 1910: Marylebone West
Party	Candidate	Votes	%	±%
Conservative	Samuel Scott	3,929	67.1	+2.8
Liberal	Arthur Hewett Spokes	1,926	32.9	−2.8
Majority		2,003	34.2	+5.6
Turnout		5,855	68.3	−12.4
Conservative hold		Swing	+2.8	

General Election 1914–15:

Another General Election was required to take place before the end of 1915. The political parties had been making preparations for an election to take place and by July 1914, the following candidates had been selected;

- Unionist: Samuel Scott
- Liberal:
