= Alec Cunningham-Reid =

British flying ace and politician (1895–1977)

Captain Alec Cunningham-Reid DFC
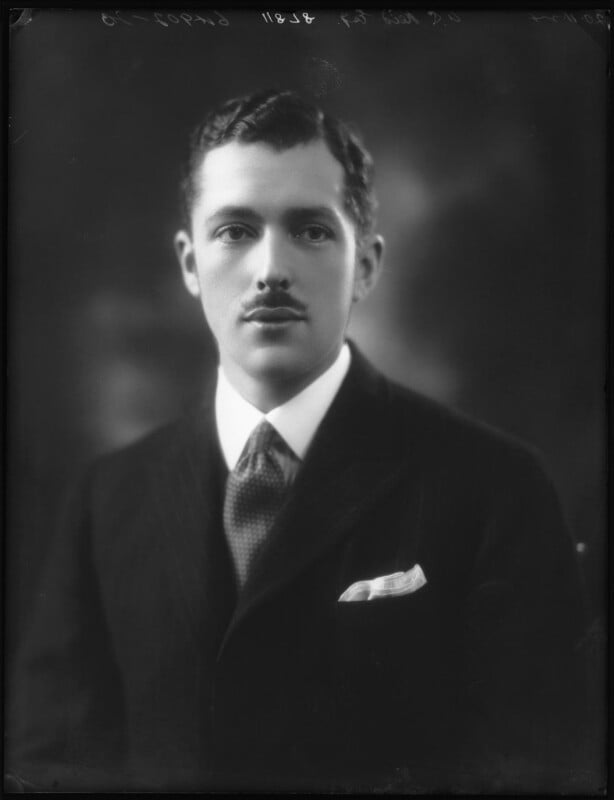
- Cunningham-Reid in 1924

Member of Parliament for St Marylebone
- In office 28 April 1932 – 5 July 1945
- Preceded by: Sir Rennell Rodd, Bt
- Succeeded by: Wavell Wakefield

Member of Parliament for Warrington
- In office 29 October 1924 – 30 May 1929
- Preceded by: Charles Dukes
- Succeeded by: Charles Dukes
- In office 15 November 1922 – 6 December 1923
- Preceded by: Sir Harold Smith
- Succeeded by: Charles Dukes

Personal details
- Born: 20 April 1895 Wayland, Norfolk, England
- Died: 26 March 1977 (aged 81) Valbonne, France
- Party: Conservative
- Spouses: Ruth Mary Clarisse Ashley (m. 1927; div. 1940); Angela Williams (m. 1944; div. 1949)
- Children: 3

Military service
- Allegiance: United Kingdom
- Branch/service: British Army; Royal Air Force
- Rank: Captain
- Unit: Royal Engineers; No. 85 Squadron RAF
- Battles/wars: First World War
- Awards: Distinguished Flying Cross

Captain Alec Stratford Cunningham-Reid DFC (20 April 1895 – 26 March 1977), known in his early life as Alec Stratford Reid, was a British First World War flying ace credited with seven aerial victories. After the war, he entered politics as a Conservative, serving as a Member of Parliament (MP) for periods between 1922 and 1945.

== Early life ==
Cunningham-Reid was born in Wayland, Norfolk.

He joined the Royal Engineers during the First World War and was commissioned as a second lieutenant, transferring to the Royal Flying Corps. In August 1918, he was awarded the Distinguished Flying Cross, the citation reading:

Lt. Alec Cunningham Reid (formerly R. E.).
When engaging a column of infantry at a very low altitude, this officer saw a hostile balloon on the ground. This he attacked and burnt. On the two following days he shot down two aeroplanes, and a few days later destroyed a third.

— Citation as published in the supplement to the London Gazette, 3 August 1918 (30827/9203)

== Political career ==
At the 1922 general election, Cunningham-Reid stood as the Conservative candidate in Warrington, a Conservative-held borough constituency in Lancashire where the sitting member Sir Harold Smith was retiring. He won the seat with a comfortable majority in a two-way contest with the Labour Party candidate. However, at the next general election, in 1923, the addition of a Liberal Party candidate saw him lose to Labour's Charles Dukes.

The Liberals in Warrington did not field a candidate at the 1924 general election, and Reid was returned to the House of Commons for the next five years. At the 1929 election he did not stand in Warrington, but instead sought election in Southampton. This was a two-seat constituency, where both the sitting members were Conservatives not seeking re-election. Having returned only Conservatives since 1922, this might have been regarded as safer Conservative territory than Warrington, but Labour won both seats.

Cunningham-Reid's next chance to return to the Commons came in 1932, when the Conservative member Sir Rennell Rodd resigned from Parliament. This caused a by-election in his inner London constituency of St Marylebone, where Cunningham-Reid was adopted as the candidate of the St Marylebone Conservative and Constitutional Union, which was the official Conservative and Unionist organisation in the area. However, a number of local Conservatives who opposed his adoption left to form the rival St Marylebone Conservative Association and nominated their own candidate, Sir B. P Blackett. It was customary for the Conservative Party leader (then Stanley Baldwin) to send a letter of support to the party's candidate, but both Blackett and Cunningham-Reid each claimed to be the official Conservative nominee, and Baldwin did not endorse either of them. No other candidates were nominated, so the election became a two-way contest between the rival Conservatives. In the event, Cunningham-Reid won the seat with a slender majority of 1,013 (4.6% of the votes), and held it for a further thirteen years. At the 1935 general election he was returned as the sole Conservative candidate with a huge majority over his Labour opponent.

In 1943 the St Marylebone Conservative and Constitutional Union was disaffiliated from the National Union of Conservative and Unionist Associations in favour of the rival St Marylebone Conservative Association, which had remained in existence since the 1932 split. At the 1945 general election, Cunningham-Reid retained the support of the Conservative and Constitutional Union, but was opposed by Wavell Wakefield, a former captain of the England national rugby union team, who received the Conservative Association's endorsement. Without official party support, Cunningham-Reid fared poorly, finishing third with only 11% of the votes. Wavell won the seat with a comfortable majority over the second-placed Labour candidate.

=== In Parliament ===
On 28 July 1943, Cunningham-Reid was involved in an exchange of blows in the lobby of the House of Commons with fellow Conservative MP Oliver Locker-Lampson. Cunningham-Reid's description of the incident was that after a verbal dispute,

He [Locker-Lampson] ran whirling his arms around his head and struck me in the chest. I retaliated by hitting him on the head. He went down on his knees. I helped him up and by that time other members had gotten between us

— The Evening Independent, 29 July 1943

The following day, both MPs made a formal apology in the House of Commons. On 30 July Cunningham-Reid made a personal statement in which he explained to the House that the matter had arisen after Locker-Lampson had accused him of leaving London during the Blitz, whereas he claimed to have departed on a 14-week trip before the Blitz started. The incident became front-page news in Britain, and was reported in several major American newspapers — including the Los Angeles Times, which ran the story under the headline "England Grins as Members of Commons Trade Punches".

== Personal life ==
Cunningham-Reid was married twice. His first marriage, on 12 May 1927, was to The Hon. Ruth Mary Clarisse Ashley. The couple, described by The Cincinnati Enquirer as "England's wealthiest girl and handsomest man", had two children. On their honeymoon, she insisted that they share her wealth because "no decent woman likes to have a man live with her in charity", but when the couple divorced in 1940, he sued for half of her $400,000 annual income.

In 1944 Cunningham-Reid married, secondly, Angela Williams; they divorced in about 1949. During the Second World War he conducted an affair with the American heiress Doris Duke.

== Death ==
Cunningham-Reid died in Valbonne, France, on 26 March 1977.

Parliament of the United Kingdom
Preceded by Sir Harold Smith	Member of Parliament for Warrington; 1922–1923	Succeeded by Charles Dukes
Preceded by Charles Dukes	Member of Parliament for Warrington; 1924–1929	Succeeded by Charles Dukes
Preceded by Sir Rennell Rodd, Bt	Member of Parliament for St Marylebone; 1932–1945	Succeeded by Wavell Wakefield
