= Warrington (constituency) =

Parliamentary constituency in the United Kingdom, 1832–1983

- Former borough constituency for the House of Commons
- Warrington in Lancashire, showing boundaries used from 1974–1983

1832–1983
- Seats: One
- Created from: Lancashire
- Replaced by: Warrington North and Warrington South

Warrington was a parliamentary constituency in the United Kingdom. From 1832 to 1983 it returned one Member of Parliament (MP) to the House of Commons of the Parliament of the United Kingdom.

== History ==
The Warrington constituency covered the central part of the town of Warrington in Lancashire and surrounding area.

In 1983 it was abolished and replaced by Warrington North and Warrington South constituencies.

== Boundaries ==
The Parliamentary Borough of Warrington was defined by the Parliamentary Boundaries Act 1832 as comprising:

The respective Townships of Warrington and Latchford; and also those two detached portions of the township of Thelwall which lie between the boundary of the township of Latchford and the River Mersey

It was this area that was incorporated as a Municipal Borough in 1847. The boundaries were unchanged until 1918 when the constituency was redefined as being identical with the area of the County Borough of Warrington. The constituency boundaries were widened to reflect those of the County Borough in 1950, at the same time it was renamed as Warrington Borough Constituency.

== Members of Parliament ==
Year	Member	Party
1832	Edmund George Hornby	Whig
1835	John Ireland Blackburne	Conservative
1847	Gilbert Greenall	Conservative
1868	Peter Rylands	Liberal
1874	Gilbert Greenall	Conservative
1880	John Gordon McMinnies	Liberal
1885	Sir Gilbert Greenall	Conservative
1892	Robert Pierpont	Conservative
1906	Arthur Crosfield	Liberal
1910	Harold Smith	Conservative
1922	Alec Cunningham-Reid	Conservative
1923	Charles Dukes	Labour
1924	Alec Cunningham-Reid	Conservative
1929	Charles Dukes	Labour
1931	Noel Goldie	Conservative
1945	Edward Porter	Labour
1950	Hyacinth Morgan	Labour
1955	Edith Summerskill	Labour
1961	Thomas Williams	Labour
1981	Doug Hoyle	Labour
1983	constituency abolished	

== Election results ==
=== Elections in the 1830s ===
General election 1832: Warrington
Party	Candidate	Votes	%
Whig	Edmund George Hornby	203	53.6
Tory	John Ireland Blackburne	176	46.4
Majority		27	7.2
Turnout		379	83.1
Registered electors		456	
Whig win (new seat)			

General election 1835: Warrington
Party	Candidate	Votes	%	±%
Conservative	John Ireland Blackburne	148	53.2	▲6.8
Radical	Charles Hindley	130	46.8	▼6.8
Majority		18	6.4	N/A
Turnout		278	49.9	▼33.2
Registered electors		557		
Conservative gain from Whig		Swing	▲3.0	

General election 1837: Warrington
Party	Candidate	Votes	%	±%
Conservative	John Ireland Blackburne	278	52.3	▼0.9
Whig	Edward Davies Davenport	254	47.7	▲0.9
Majority		24	4.6	▼1.8
Turnout		532	83.8	▲33.9
Registered electors		635		
Conservative hold		Swing	▼0.9	

=== Elections in the 1840s ===
General election 1841: Warrington
Party	Candidate	Votes	%	±%
Conservative	John Ireland Blackburne	Unopposed		
Registered electors		633		
Conservative hold				

General election 1847: Warrington
Party	Candidate	Votes	%	±%
Conservative	Gilbert Greenall	327	52.3	N/A
Whig	William Allcard	298	47.7	New
Majority		29	4.6	N/A
Turnout		625	89.4	N/A
Registered electors		699		
Conservative hold		Swing	N/A	

=== Elections in the 1850s ===
General election 1852: Warrington
Party	Candidate	Votes	%	±%
Conservative	Gilbert Greenall	Unopposed		
Registered electors		701		
Conservative hold				

General election 1857: Warrington
Party	Candidate	Votes	%	±%
Conservative	Gilbert Greenall	Unopposed		
Registered electors		720		
Conservative hold				

General election 1859: Warrington
Party	Candidate	Votes	%	±%
Conservative	Gilbert Greenall	Unopposed		
Registered electors		723		
Conservative hold				

=== Elections in the 1860s ===
General election 1865: Warrington
Party	Candidate	Votes	%	±%
Conservative	Gilbert Greenall	Unopposed		
Registered electors		768		
Conservative hold				

General election 1868: Warrington
Party	Candidate	Votes	%	±%
Liberal	Peter Rylands	1,984	50.3	New
Conservative	Gilbert Greenall	1,957	49.7	N/A
Majority		27	0.6	N/A
Turnout		3,941	88.2	N/A
Registered electors		4,470		
Liberal gain from Conservative		Swing	N/A	

=== Elections in the 1870s ===
General election 1874: Warrington
Party	Candidate	Votes	%	±%
Conservative	Gilbert Greenall	2,381	52.0	▲2.3
Liberal	Peter Rylands	2,201	48.0	▼2.3
Majority		180	4.0	N/A
Turnout		4,582	91.2	▲3.0
Registered electors		5,022		
Conservative gain from Liberal		Swing		

=== Elections in the 1880s ===
General election 1880: Warrington
Party	Candidate	Votes	%	±%
Liberal	John Gordon McMinnies	3,002	54.8	▲6.8
Conservative	Gilbert Greenall	2,473	45.2	▼6.8
Majority		529	9.6	N/A
Turnout		5,475	92.5	▲1.3
Registered electors		5,919		
Liberal gain from Conservative		Swing	▲4.6	

General election 1885: Warrington
Party	Candidate	Votes	%	±%
Conservative	Gilbert Greenall	4,010	55.4	▲10.2
Liberal	William Crosfield	3,234	44.6	▼10.2
Majority		776	10.8	N/A
Turnout		7,244	93.7	▲1.2
Registered electors		7,730		
Conservative hold		Swing	▲8.5	

General election 1886: Warrington
Party	Candidate	Votes	%	±%
Conservative	Gilbert Greenall	3,717	53.6	▼1.8
Liberal	John Crosfield	3,216	46.4	▲1.8
Majority		501	7.2	▼3.6
Turnout		6,933	89.7	▼4.0
Registered electors		7,730		
Conservative hold		Swing	▼6.0	

=== Elections in the 1890s ===
Pierpoint

General election 1892: Warrington
Party	Candidate	Votes	%	±%
Conservative	Robert Pierpont	3,843	54.1	▲0.5
Liberal	Arthur Houston	3,258	45.9	▼0.5
Majority		585	8.2	▲1.0
Turnout		7,101	89.8	▲0.1
Registered electors		7,906		
Conservative hold		Swing	▲1.2	

General election 1895: Warrington
Party	Candidate	Votes	%	±%
Conservative	Robert Pierpont	4,001	54.6	▲0.5
Liberal	Percival Brown Scott	3,326	45.4	▼0.5
Majority		675	9.2	▲1.0
Turnout		7,327	86.7	▼3.1
Registered electors		8,449		
Conservative hold		Swing	▲0.5	

=== Elections in the 1900s ===
General election 1900: Warrington
Party	Candidate	Votes	%	±%
Conservative	Robert Pierpont	4,468	57.5	▲2.9
Liberal	Arthur Crosfield	3,303	42.5	▼2.9
Majority		1,165	15.0	▲5.8
Turnout		7,771	83.0	▼3.7
Registered electors		9,360		
Conservative hold		Swing	▲1.7	

Crosfield

General election 1906: Warrington
Party	Candidate	Votes	%	±%
Liberal	Arthur Crosfield	5,599	57.7	▲15.2
Conservative	Robert Pierpont	4,099	42.3	▼15.2
Majority		1,500	15.4	N/A
Turnout		9,698	93.6	▲10.6
Registered electors		10,365		
Liberal gain from Conservative		Swing	▲9.1	

=== Elections in the 1910s ===
General election January 1910: Warrington
Party	Candidate	Votes	%	±%
Liberal	Arthur Crosfield	5,256	50.7	▼7.0
Conservative	Robert Pierpont	5,103	49.3	▲7.0
Majority		153	1.4	▼14.0
Turnout		10,359	95.8	▲2.2
Registered electors		10,814		
Liberal hold		Swing	▼11.1	

General election December 1910: Warrington
Party	Candidate	Votes	%	±%
Conservative	Harold Smith	5,162	51.2	▲1.9
Liberal	Arthur Crosfield	4,916	48.8	▼1.9
Majority		246	2.4	N/A
Turnout		10,078	93.2	▼2.6
Registered electors		10,814		
Conservative gain from Liberal		Swing	▲4.5	

General Election 1914–15:

Another General Election was required to take place before the end of 1915. The political parties had been making preparations for an election to take place and by July 1914, the following candidates had been selected;

- Unionist: Harold Smith
- Liberal:

General election 1918: Warrington
Party		Candidate	Votes	%	±%
C	Unionist	Harold Smith	10,403	43.7	▼7.5
	Liberal	Peter Peacock	8,011	33.7	▼15.1
	Labour	Isaac Brassington	5,377	22.6	New
Majority			2,392	10.0	▲7.6
Turnout			23,791	70.2	▼23.0
	Unionist hold		Swing	▼4.7	
C indicates candidate endorsed by the coalition government.

=== Elections in the 1920s ===
General election 1922: Warrington
Party	Candidate	Votes	%	±%
Unionist	Alec Cunningham-Reid	15,394	53.1	▲9.4
Labour	James Gregory	13,570	46.9	▲24.3
Majority		1,824	6.2	▼3.8
Turnout		28,964	84.7	▲14.5
Unionist hold		Swing	▲8.5	

General election 1923: Warrington
Party	Candidate	Votes	%	±%
Labour	Charles Dukes	12,984	43.6	▼3.3
Unionist	Alec Cunningham-Reid	12,314	41.3	▼11.8
Liberal	John Francis Crowley	4511	15.1	New
Majority		670	2.3	N/A
Turnout		29,809	86.1	▲1.4
Labour gain from Unionist		Swing	▼6.4	

General election 1924: Warrington
Party	Candidate	Votes	%	±%
Unionist	Alec Cunningham-Reid	16,788	52.4	▲11.1
Labour	Charles Dukes	15,251	47.6	▲4.0
Majority		1,537	4.8	N/A
Turnout		32,039	91.0	▲4.9
Unionist gain from Labour		Swing	▲11.5	

Garland

General election 1929: Warrington
Party	Candidate	Votes	%	±%
Labour	Charles Dukes	21,610	50.6	▲3.0
Unionist	Noel Goldie	18,025	42.2	▼10.2
Liberal	Alison Garland	3,070	7.2	New
Majority		3,585	8.4	N/A
Turnout		42,705	89.3	▼1.7
Labour gain from Unionist		Swing	▲3.5	

=== Elections in the 1930s ===
General election 1931: Warrington
Party	Candidate	Votes	%	±%
Conservative	Noel Goldie	24,400	56.2	▲14.0
Labour	Charles Dukes	19,055	43.9	▼6.7
Majority		5,345	12.4	N/A
Turnout		43,455	72.4	▼16.9
Conservative gain from Labour		Swing	▲12.1	

General election 1935: Warrington
Party	Candidate	Votes	%	±%
Conservative	Noel Goldie	21,324	50.7	▼5.5
Labour	Edward Porter	20,720	49.3	▲5.4
Majority		604	1.4	▼11.0
Turnout		42,044	84.8	▲12.4
Conservative hold		Swing	▲9.7	

=== Elections in the 1940s ===
General election 1945: Warrington
Party	Candidate	Votes	%	±%
Labour	Edward Porter	22,265	62.9	▲13.6
Conservative	Noel Goldie	13,110	37.1	▼13.6
Majority		9,155	25.8	N/A
Turnout		35,375	73.8	▼11.0
Labour gain from Conservative		Swing	▲13.6	

=== Elections in the 1950s ===
General election 1950: Warrington
Party	Candidate	Votes	%	±%
Labour	Hyacinth Morgan	26,482	56.8	▼6.1
Conservative	Francis Leslie Neep	17,730	38.0	▲0.9
Liberal	James Campbell Park	1,899	4.1	New
Communist	James Joseph Grady	496	1.1	New
Majority		8,752	18.8	▼7.0
Turnout		46,607	86.0	▲12.2
Labour hold		Swing	▼9.9	

General election 1951: Warrington
Party	Candidate	Votes	%	±%
Labour	Hyacinth Morgan	26,225	57.8	▲1.0
Conservative	F Joan Crowther	17,623	38.8	▲0.8
Liberal	James Campbell Park	1,537	3.4	▼0.7
Majority		8,602	19.0	▲0.2
Turnout		45,385	82.8	▼3.2
Labour hold		Swing	▲3.1	

General election 1955: Warrington
Party	Candidate	Votes	%	±%
Labour	Edith Summerskill	22,721	57.1	▼0.7
Conservative	Herbert Davies	17,075	42.9	▲4.1
Majority		5,646	14.2	▼4.8
Turnout		39,796	73.9	▼8.9
Labour hold		Swing	▼0.9	

General election 1959: Warrington
Party	Candidate	Votes	%	±%
Labour	Edith Summerskill	22,890	56.3	▼0.8
Conservative	Frank O Stansfield	17,791	43.7	▲0.8
Majority		5,099	12.5	▼1.7
Turnout		40,681	73.9	0.0
Labour hold		Swing	▼0.8	

=== Elections in the 1960s ===
1961 Warrington by-election
Party	Candidate	Votes	%	±%
Labour Co-op	Thomas Williams	16,149	55.8	▼0.5
Conservative	Beata Brookes	9,149	32.1	▼11.6
Liberal	Frank Tetlow	3,623	12.5	New
Majority		7,000	23.8	▲11.3
Turnout		28,921	56.7	▼20.2
Labour Co-op hold		Swing	▼0.6	

General election 1964: Warrington
Party	Candidate	Votes	%	±%
Labour Co-op	Thomas Williams	20,551	57.1	▲0.8
Conservative	William A Lowe	11,297	31.4	▼12.3
Liberal	Michael Ford Pitts	4,119	11.5	N/A
Majority		9,254	25.7	▲13.2
Turnout		35,967	71.4	▼2.5
Labour Co-op hold		Swing	▲0.9	

General election 1966: Warrington
Party	Candidate	Votes	%	±%
Labour Co-op	Thomas Williams	21,930	64.7	▲7.6
Conservative	W Peter Adshead	8,918	26.3	▼5.1
Liberal	Edward J Woods	3,070	9.1	▼2.4
Majority		13,012	38.4	▲12.7
Turnout		33,918	68.9	▼2.5
Labour Co-op hold		Swing	▲4.5	

=== Elections in the 1970s ===
General election 1970: Warrington
Party	Candidate	Votes	%	±%
Labour Co-op	Thomas Williams	20,970	64.3	▼0.4
Conservative	Alfred B Gooch	11,647	35.7	▲9.4
Majority		9,323	28.6	▼9.8
Turnout		32,617	65.2	▼3.7
Labour Co-op hold		Swing	▼4.0	

General election February 1974: Warrington
Party	Candidate	Votes	%	±%
Labour Co-op	Thomas Williams	19,550	57.2	▼7.1
Conservative	JW Hayton	8,444	24.7	▼11.0
Liberal	FJ Deakin	6,187	18.1	New
Majority		11,106	32.5	▲3.9
Turnout		34,181	73.9	▼8.7
Labour Co-op hold		Swing	▼3.8	

General election October 1974: Warrington
Party	Candidate	Votes	%	±%
Labour Co-op	Thomas Williams	19,882	62.8	▲5.6
Conservative	JW Hayton	7,621	24.1	▼0.6
Liberal	FJ Deakin	4,158	13.1	▼5.0
Majority		12,261	38.7	▲6.2
Turnout		31,661	68.0	▼5.9
Labour Co-op hold		Swing	▲6.4	

General election 1979: Warrington
Party	Candidate	Votes	%	±%
Labour Co-op	Thomas Williams	19,306	61.6	▼1.2
Conservative	G Povey	9,032	28.8	▲4.7
Liberal	Iain Brodie Browne	2,883	9.1	▼4.0
Social Democratic	C Campbell	144	0.5	New
Majority		10,274	32.8	▼5.9
Turnout		31,365	71.3	▲3.3
Labour Co-op hold		Swing	▼3.4	

=== Elections in the 1980s ===
1981 Warrington by-election
Party	Candidate	Votes	%	±%
Labour	Doug Hoyle	14,280	48.4	▼13.2
SDP	Roy Jenkins	12,521	42.4	▲33.3
Conservative	Stanley Sorrell	2,102	7.1	▼21.7
Ecology	Neil Chantrell	219	0.8	New
United Democratic Labour Party	Daniel Hussey	149	0.5	New
Citizen's Band Radio Party	Iain Leslie	111	0.4	New
Independent Labour	John Fleming	53	0.2	New
Social Democratic	Donald Kean	38	0.1	▼0.4
Democratic Monarchist	Bill Boaks	14	0.1	New
English Democratic Party	Harry Wise	11	0.0	New
More Prosperous Britain	Tom Keen	10	0.0	New
Majority		1,759	6.0	▼26.8
Turnout		29,508	67.0	▼4.3
Labour hold		Swing	▼7.2	

== Sources ==
- Craig, F. W. S. (1989) [1977]. British parliamentary election results 1832–1885 (2nd ed.). Chichester: Parliamentary Research Services. p. 319. ISBN 0-900178-26-4.
- Craig, F. W. S. (1989) [1974]. British parliamentary election results 1885–1918 (2nd ed.). Chichester: Parliamentary Research Services. p. 202. ISBN 0-900178-27-2.
- Craig, F. W. S. (1983) [1969]. British parliamentary election results 1918–1949 (3rd ed.). Chichester: Parliamentary Research Services. p. 267. ISBN 0-900178-06-X.
- Leigh Rayment's Historical List of MPs – Constituencies beginning with "W" (part 1)
