= Edmund Hornby (politician) =

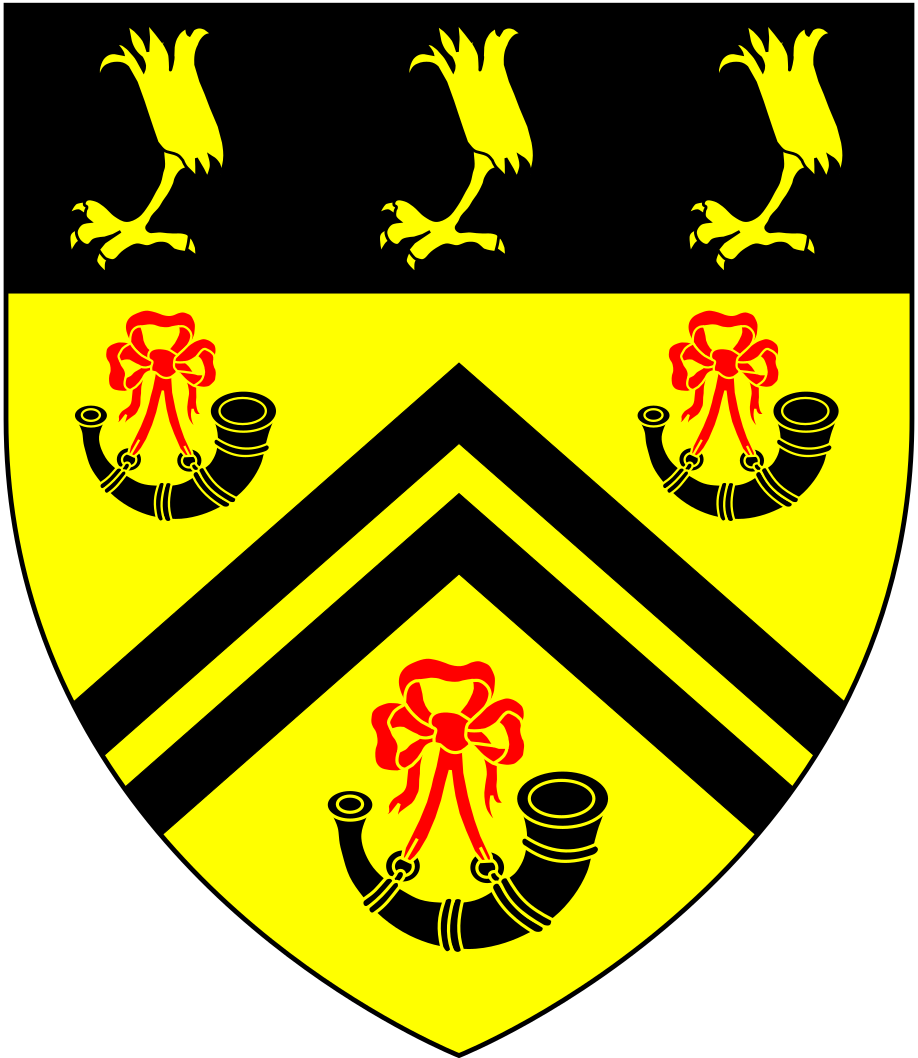
Arms of Hornby: Or, two chevronels between three bugle-horns sable stringed gules on a chief of the second as many eagle's legs erased of the first

Edmund Hornby (1773–1857) of Dalton Hall near Burton, Westmorland, was a Member of Parliament for Preston, Lancashire, from 1812 to 1826. He was a nephew and son-in-law of Edward Smith-Stanley, 13th Earl of Derby (1775–1851).

== Origins ==
He was the eldest son and heir of Rev. Geoffrey Hornby (1750–1812), of Scale Hall, near Lancaster in Lancashire, High Sheriff of Lancashire in 1774 and a Deputy Lieutenant of Lancashire, Colonel of a regiment of Lancashire militia, by his wife Lucy Smith-Stanley (d.1833) a daughter of James Smith-Stanley, Lord Strange (1716–1771), (son and heir apparent of Edward Stanley, 11th Earl of Derby (1689–1776) of Knowsley Hall in Lancashire) and a sister of Edward Smith-Stanley, 12th Earl of Derby (1752–1834). Edmund's sister Charlotte Margaret Hornby (d.1817) married her first cousin Edward Smith-Stanley, 13th Earl of Derby (1775–1851), KG, and was the mother of Edward Smith-Stanley, 14th Earl of Derby (1799–1869), thrice Prime Minister of the United Kingdom (1852, 1858–9, 1866–8), thus Edmund's nephew. One of Edmund's younger brothers was Admiral Sir Phipps Hornby (1785–1867).

== Marriage and children ==
He married his first cousin Lady Charlotte Stanley (d.1805), a daughter of Edward Smith-Stanley, 12th Earl of Derby (1752–1834), by whom he had issue including:

- Edmund George Hornby (1799–1865) of Dalton Hall, eldest son and heir, a Member of Parliament for Warrington and Constable of Lancaster Castle.
