= Gilbert Greenall, 1st Baron Daresbury =

British Baron (1867–1938)

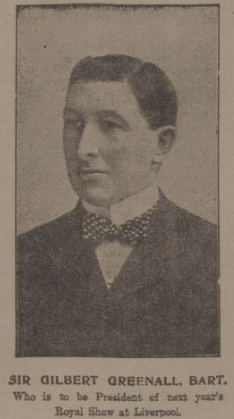
Sir Gilbert Greenall, Bart., circa. 1909.

Gilbert Greenall, 1st Baron Daresbury, CVO, JP, DL (30 March 1867 – 24 October 1938), known as Sir Gilbert Greenall, 2nd Baronet, from 1894 to 1927, was a British brewer, business man, landowner, peer, and master of foxhounds.

Greenall was the son of Sir Gilbert Greenall, 1st Baronet. The family's wealth was based on the brewing business established by Greenall's great-grandfather Thomas Greenall in 1762 (which later became the Greenall's Group). His father also had large interests in canals and banking.

Greenall was educated at Wixenford School and Eton College. He succeeded his father in the baronetcy in 1894.

In the late 1890s, Greenall sought the position of Master of the Cheshire Foxhounds, but was turned down, as he was deemed to be "not quite a gentleman". However, he was taken on as Master by the Belvoir Hunt and served for sixteen years.

Greenall served as High Sheriff of Cheshire for the year 1907 and was appointed as a deputy lieutenant the same year. He was appointed a Commander of the Royal Victorian Order (CVO) in 1911. In the 1927 Birthday Honours he was raised to the peerage as Baron Daresbury, of Walton in the County of Chester.

Lord Daresbury married Frances Eliza, daughter of Captain Edward Wynne Griffith, in 1900. He died in October 1938, aged 71, and was succeeded in his titles by his son Edward. Lady Daresbury died in 1953.

== Arms ==
Coat of arms of Gilbert Greenall, 1st Baron Daresbury
Crest Between two wings Or a pomme surmounted by a bugle horn as in the arms. Escutcheon Quarterly 1st & 4th Or on a bend nebuly Vert three bugle horns stringed of the field (Greenall) 2nd & 3rd Argent five pallets Sable the centre pallet charged with an Ermine spot of the field. Supporters Dexter a bull Proper sinister a bay mare mane and tail Sable charged on the shoulder with a sprig of two oak leaves Or. Motto Alta Peto Badge A rose Gules and two ears of wheat leaved and slipped in saltire Proper enfiled with a baron’s coronet Or.

== Sources ==
- Kidd, Charles, Williamson, David (editors). Debrett's Peerage and Baronetage (1990 edition). New York: St Martin's Press, 1990.
- Leigh Rayment's Peerage Pages

Honorary titles
Preceded by William Watson	High Sheriff of Cheshire; 1907	Succeeded by Sir William Pollitt
Peerage of the United Kingdom
New creation	Baron Daresbury; 1927–1938	Succeeded by Edward Greenall
Baronetage of the United Kingdom
Preceded by Gilbert Greenall	Baronet (of Walton Hall); 1894–1938	Succeeded by Edward Greenall
