= Charles Dukes, 1st Baron Dukeston =

British trade unionist and Labour Party politician

Charles Dukes, 1st Baron Dukeston CBE (28 October 1881 – 14 May 1948) was a British trade unionist and Labour Party politician.

Born in Stourbridge, Dukes left school at the age of eleven, taking up work as an errand boy. When his family moved to Warrington, he joined working in a forge. He subsequently had a number of casual jobs throughout north west England, including working on the Manchester Ship Canal.

In 1909 his career as a trade union official began when he was elected secretary of the Warrington branch of the National Union of Gasworkers. He was a founding member of the British Socialist Party, and was elected to the party's national executive in 1914. During the First World War he was a conscientious objector, serving some time in prison. He became a district secretary in what had become the National Union of General Workers. From 1934 to 1946, Dukes was General Secretary of the National Union of General and Municipal Workers. From 1946 to 1947 he was President of the Trades Union Congress. In 1947 he was appointed a director of the Bank of England.

Although Charles Dukes had no biological children, he mentored two of his sister Annie's children, Jack and Reginald Cooper, and raised them in what is now known as the GMB Union.

Jack Cooper later followed in his Uncle's footsteps and became a Labour MP and also a General Secretary of the GMB Union (Jack Cooper, Baron Cooper of Stockton Heath)

== Parliamentary career ==
At the 1923 general election, Dukes was elected as the Member of Parliament (MP) for Warrington in Lancashire, narrowly defeating the sitting Conservative MP Alec Cunningham-Reid. When the First Labour Government fell in 1924, Dukes lost his seat in the resulting 1924 general election, unseated by his predecessor Cunningham-Reid.

However, at the 1929 general election, when Cunningham-Reid abandoned Warrington and stood unsuccessfully in Southampton, Dukes was returned again to the House of Commons. When Labour split in 1931 over the handling of budgetary response to the Great Depression, Dukes was defeated in the subsequent general election, and did not stand for election to the House of Commons again.

In 1942 he was made a Commander of the Order of the British Empire and in 1946 was appointed an adviser to the Paris Peace Conference.

Dukes was the first British representative on the new United Nations Commission on Human Rights, advised by his alternate member, Geoffrey Masterman Wilson. In 1947, they worked together on the British input into the drafting of the Universal Declaration on Human Rights.

Dukes was ennobled in 1947 as Baron Dukeston, of Warrington in the County Palatine of Lancaster, giving him a seat in the House of Lords. He proved to be an active Labour Party peer. He died the following year in a London hospital, aged 66, without an heir, and the peerage became extinct. He was buried in Chesham Bois, Buckinghamshire, close to his home in Amersham.

Parliament of the United Kingdom
Preceded by Alec Cunningham-Reid	Member of Parliament for Warrington; 1923 – 1924	Succeeded by Alec Cunningham-Reid
Preceded by Alec Cunningham-Reid	Member of Parliament for Warrington; 1929 – 1931	Succeeded by Noel Goldie
Trade union offices
Preceded by Walter Wood	Leeds District Secretary of the National Union of General and Municipal Workers; 1924–1925	Succeeded by J. D. S. Highman
Preceded by Fleming Eccles	Lancashire District Secretary of the National Union of General and Municipal Workers; 1925–1934	Succeeded by Arthur Seabury
Preceded by John Beard and Frank Wolstencroft	Trades Union Congress representative to the American Federation of Labour; 1932; With: Bill Holmes	Succeeded by Joe Hall and Jimmy Rowan
Preceded by Peter Tevenan	President of the International Federation of Employees in Public Services; 1932–1937	Succeeded by Mark Hewitson
Preceded by Will Thorne	General Secretary of the National Union of General and Municipal Workers; 1934–1946	Succeeded by Tom Williamson
Preceded by George Hicks	Chairman of the Trades Councils' Joint Consultative Committee; 1937 – 1938	Succeeded by John Marchbank
Preceded by Ebby Edwards	President of the Trades Union Congress; 1946–1947	Succeeded by George Walker Thomson
Peerage of the United Kingdom
New creation	Baron Dukeston; 1947–1948	Extinct
