= Edmund George Hornby =

Edmund George Hornby (1799–1865) was a British politician who was MP for Warrington between 1832 and 1835. He was the son of Edmund Hornby.

Hornby drafted the Order in Council following a mission to supervise the disbursement of a British loan to the Ottoman Empire, went on to serve as the first supreme judge in Constantinople between 1857 and 1865.
