= John Gordon McMinnies =

English Liberal politician (1817–1890)

John Gordon McMinnies (17 May 1817 – 1 February 1890) was an English cotton manufacturer and Liberal politician who sat in the House of Commons from 1880 to 1885.

McMinnies was the son of John McMinnies of Lancaster. He was a senior partner in the firm of William Bashall and Co, cotton manufacturers. He was an alderman of Warrington and a J.P.

At the 1880 general election McMinnies was elected Member of Parliament for Warrington. He held the seat until 1885.

McMinnies died at the age of 72 .
