= Peter Greenall, 4th Baron Daresbury =

British aristocrat

The Right Honourable The Lord Daresbury DL

Member of the House of Lords
- Lord Temporal
- as a hereditary peer 9 September 1996 – 11 November 1999
- Preceded by: The 3rd Baron Daresbury
- Succeeded by: Seat abolished (Note: Pursuant to the House of Lords Act 1999.)

Personal details
- Born: Peter Gilbert Greenall; 8 July 1953 (age 73) Marylebone, London, England
- Party: Conservative
- Spouse: Clare Alison Weatherby
- Children: 4
- Education: Magdalene College, Cambridge; London Business School
- Profession: Businessman

Peter Gilbert Greenall, 4th Baron Daresbury (born 8 July 1953), is a British aristocrat and businessman associated primarily with horseracing, notably as the chairman of Aintree Racecourse from 1989 to 2014.

== Life and career ==
Greenall was born on 8 July 1953 in Marylebone, London, the eldest son of Edward Greenall, 3rd Baron Daresbury. He was schooled at Eton College before attending Magdalene College, Cambridge, and later the London Business School. From 1982 he was a director, and from 1992 to 1997 managing director, of the family business, Greenall's, as it evolved from a diversified brewery into De Vere. He was chief executive from 1997 and chairman from 2000, and left in 2006 when the company was sold.

Upon the death of his father on 9 September 1996, Greenall succeeded to the peerage as the 4th Baron Daresbury, and 5th Baronet Greenall, of Walton, Chester. He therefore became a member of the House of Lords, the upper chamber of the British Parliament, sitting as a hereditary peer. Lord Daresbury was removed from the House with the passage and commencement of the House of Lords Act 1999, which removed the right of all but ninety-two hereditary peers to sit; Daresbury was not one of the remaining minority.

A keen horseracing enthusiast, and himself a rider, Daresbury was appointed to the chairmanship of Aintree, home of the Grand National, Britain's richest horserace, in 1989 at the age of 35. Under his stewardship prize money for the race rose from £118,000 to £1,000,000. All four of his sons have been jockeys. He retired in 2014.

The Lord Daresbury Stand at Aintree is named in his honour.

He is a Deputy Lieutenant of County of Cheshire.

== Arms ==
Coat of arms of Peter Greenall, 4th Baron Daresbury
Crest Between two wings Or a pomme surmounted by a bugle horn as in the arms. Escutcheon Quarterly 1st & 4th Or on a bend nebuly Vert three bugle horns stringed of the field (Greenall) 2nd & 3rd Argent five pallets Sable the centre pallet charged with an Ermine spot of the field. Supporters Dexter a bull Proper sinister a bay mare mane and tail Sable charged on the shoulder with a sprig of two oak leaves Or. Motto Alta Peto Badge A rose Gules and two ears of wheat leaved and slipped in saltire Proper enfiled with a baron’s coronet Or.

== Notes ==
Peerage of the United Kingdom
Preceded by Edward Greenall	Baron Daresbury; 1996–present Member of the House of Lords (1996–1999)	Incumbent; Heir apparent: Hon. Thomas Greenall
Baronetage of the United Kingdom
Preceded by Edward Greenall	Baronet of Walton Hall; 1996–present	Incumbent; Heir apparent: Hon. Thomas Greenall
