= Thomas Claughton (MP) =

English politician (1773–1842)

Thomas Claughton (c. August 1773 – 8 March 1842) was a politician in England.

He was member of parliament (MP) for the rotten borough of Newton in Lancashire from 1818 until 1825. His sons Thomas Legh Claughton and Piers Claughton became bishops in the Anglican Church (Thomas of Rochester then St Albans; Piers of St Helena then Colombo) while his grandson Gilbert Claughton (son of Thomas) was created a baronet in 1912.

Parliament of the United Kingdom
Preceded by John Ireland Blackburne; Thomas Legh	Member of Parliament for Newton; 1818–1825; With: Thomas Legh	Succeeded by Robert Townsend-Farquhar; Thomas Legh
