= Co-operative Party election results =

UK political party election results

This article lists the Co-operative Party's election results in UK parliamentary elections.

== Summary of general election performance ==
Year	Number of Candidates	Total votes	Average votes per candidate	% UK vote	Change (percentage points)	Saved deposits	Number of MPs
1918	10	57,785	5,779	0.6	N/A	10	1
1922	11	126,406	11,491	0.9	+0.3	11	4
1923	10	107,792	10,779	0.8	−0.1	10	6
1924	10	128,827	12,883	0.8	0.0	10	5
1929	12	208,762	17,397	1.0	+0.2	12	9
1931	18	246,198	13,678	1.2	+0.2	18	1
1935	20	347,728	17,386	1.7	+0.5	19	9
1945	34	635,335	18,686	2.6	+0.9	34	23
1950	33	719,756	21,811	2.5	−0.1	33	18
1951	38	845,509	22,250	2.9	+0.4	38	16
1955	39	829,175	21,261	3.1	+0.2		19
1959	30	675,199	22,507	2.4	-0.5	30	16
1964	27	566,220	20,971	2.0	−0.4	27	19
1966	24	507,372	21,140	1.9	−0.1	24	18
1970	28	537,253	19,188	1.9	0.0		17
1974 Feb	25	518,981	20,759	1.7	-0.2	25	16
1974 Oct	22	465,592	21,163	1.6	-0.1		16
1979	25	485,115	19,405	1.6	0.0	16	17
1983	17	299,080	17,593	1.0	−0.6	16	8
1987	20	334,132	16,707	1.0	0.0	20	10
1992	27	495,702	18,359	1.5	+0.5	27	14
1997	26	654,203	25,162	2.1	+0.6	26	26
2001	30	601,197	20,040	2.3	+0.2	30	30
2005	32	584,700	18,272	2.1	−0.2	29	29
2010	43	776,358	18,505	2.9	+0.8	43	28
2015	42	873,399	20,795	2.8	−0.1	42	24
2017	52	1,350,007	25,962	4.2	+1.4	52	38
2019	50	1,025,882	19,729	3.2	−1.0	50	26
2024	44	805,340	18,303	2.8	−0.4	44	43

== Election results ==
=== By-elections, 1910–1918 ===
Election	Candidate	Votes	%	Position
January 1918 Prestwich by-election	Henry May	2,832	24.9	2

=== 1918 general election ===
Constituency	Candidate	Votes	%	Position
Birmingham King's Norton	Tom Hackett	4,917	35.8	2
Birmingham Sparkbrook	Frank Spires	3,014	15.5	2
Bradford South	William Hirst	8,291	30.9	2
Clackmannan and Eastern Stirlingshire	Henry May	5,753	32.8	2
Kettering	A. E. Waterson	10,299	45.7	1
Kilmarnock	Peter Malcolm	6,652	32.9	2
Leeds Central	Joseph Smith	2,146	13.2	3
Mossley	William Henry Brown	5,227	24.4	2
Paisley	John McLaren Biggar	7,436	33.5	2
Sheffield Hillsborough	Arthur Lockwood	4,050	26.6	2

=== By-elections, 1918–1922 ===
Election	Candidate	Votes	%	Position
1920 Paisley by-election	John McLaren Biggar	11,902	39.1	2
1920 Stockport by-election	Samuel Perry	14,434	16.2	4
1922 Nottingham East by-election	A. H. Jones	5,431	27.3	2

Jones stood as a joint Co-operative – Labour Party candidate.

=== 1922 general election ===
Constituency	Candidate	Votes	%	Position
Birmingham King's Norton	Eleanor Barton	7,017	32.8	2
Birmingham Sparkbrook	Ernest Walter Hampton	6,310	23.4	3
Bradford South	William Hirst	12,353	35.3	2
East Ham South	Alfred Barnes	10,566	48.1	1
Glasgow Tradeston	Thomas Henderson	14,190	55.7	1
Kettering	A. E. Waterson	14,204	48.8	2
Manchester Moss Side	Thomas William Mercer	4,641	19.9	3
Paisley	John McLaren Biggar	14,689	49.5	2
Sheffield Hillsborough	A. V. Alexander	15,130	56.2	1
Stockport	Samuel Perry	17,059	16.7	3
Tottenham North	Robert Morrison	10,250	44.2	1

=== 1923 general election ===
Constituency	Candidate	Votes	%	Position
Birmingham King's Norton	Eleanor Barton	6,743	30.7	2
Bradford South	William Hirst	11,543	34.9	2
East Ham South	Alfred Barnes	11,402	49.2	1
Glasgow Partick	Andrew Young	8,397	44.0	1
Glasgow Tradeston	Thomas Henderson	12,787	60.1	1
Kettering	Samuel Perry	12,718	43.6	1
Leeds North East	Frank Fountain	8,574	31.3	2
Paisley	John McLaren Biggar	7,977	27.4	2
Sheffield Hillsborough	A. V. Alexander	15,087	55.7	1
Tottenham North	Robert Morrison	12,696	49.7	1

=== 1924 general election ===
Constituency	Candidate	Votes	%	Position
Birmingham Deritend	Fred Longden	12,760	48.5	2
Bradford South	William Hirst	13,919	39.0	1
East Ham South	Alfred Barnes	13,644	51.9	1
Glasgow Partick	Andrew Young	9,612	42.2	2
Glasgow Tradeston	Thomas Henderson	14,067	56.0	1
Kettering	Samuel Perry	14,801	49.6	2
Leeds North East	Edna Penny	8,894	31.6	2
Mossley	Thomas William Mercer	10,767	34.3	2
Sheffield Hillsborough	A. V. Alexander	16,573	56.9	1
Tottenham North	Robert Morrison	13,800	51.0	1

=== 1929 general election ===
Constituency	Candidate	Votes	%	Position
Barkston Ash	George Saville Woods	18,321	47.7	2
Birmingham Deritend	Fred Longden	16,932	50.7	1
Bradford South	William Hirst	23,251	48.9	1
East Ham South	Alfred Barnes	18,956	54.3	1
Glasgow Tradeston	Thomas Henderson	17,864	58.7	1
Greenock	William Leonard	9,697	28.2	2
Hammersmith South	Daniel Chater	12,630	43.8	1
Kettering	Samuel Perry	18,253	43.8	1
Mossley	Herbert Gibson	19,296	46.0	1
Nottingham Central	Eleanor Barton	11,573	33.2	2
Sheffield Hillsborough	A. V. Alexander	20,941	57.3	1
Tottenham North	Robert Morrison	20,884	54.0	1

Candidates stood jointly with the Labour Party.

=== By-election, 1929–1931 ===
Election	Candidate	Votes	%	Position
Nottingham Central by-election, 1930	Alfred Waterson	7,923	28.8	2
Glasgow St Rollox by-election, 1931	William Leonard	10,044	45.2	1

Candidates stood jointly with the Labour Party.

=== 1931 general election ===
Constituency	Candidate	Votes	%	Position
Barkston Ash	George Saville Woods	14,585	34.3	2
Birmingham Deritend	Fred Longden	11,163	34.0	2
Bradford South	William Hirst	15,994	33.6	2
Brighton	Rosalind Moore	12,878	07.3	4
East Ham South	Alfred Barnes	15,737	46.2	2
East Renfrewshire	James Strain	12,477	26.7	2
Edmonton	Frank Broad	14,250	43.2	2
Finsbury	Thomas Williams	10,133	36.9	2
Glasgow St Rollox	William Leonard	13,545	44.7	1
Glasgow Tradeston	Thomas Henderson	13,579	47.4	2
Hammersmith South	Daniel Chater	8,390	28.5	2
Kettering	Samuel Perry	17,095	39.8	2
Mossley	Herbert Gibson	15,587	33.5	2
Nottingham Central	Alfred Waterson	7,532	22.6	2
Sheffield Hillsborough	A. V. Alexander	17,319	42.1	2
Tottenham North	Robert Morrison	17,651	44.3	2
Twickenham	Percy Holman	13,763	26.0	2
Woolwich West	Joseph Reeves	14,520	35.4	2

Candidates stood jointly with the Labour Party.

=== By-elections, 1931–1935 ===
Election	Candidate	Votes	%	Position
Twickenham by-election, 1932	Percy Holman	16,881	43.8	2
Manchester Rusholme by-election, 1933	George Woods	11,005	40.1	2
Twickenham by-election, 1934	Percy Holman	19,890	43.9	2
Dumfriesshire by-election, 1935	John Downie	10,697	39.7	2

Candidates stood jointly with the Labour Party.

=== 1935 general election ===
Constituency	Candidate	Votes	%	Position
Barkston Ash	F. Smithson	16,525	39.1	2
Bethnal Green North East	Daniel Chater	11,581	63.5	1
Birmingham Deritend	Fred Longden	10,144	40.5	2
Bradford South	William Hirst	17,121	41.5	2
Deptford	Walter Henry Green	27,021	57.3	1
Dumfriesshire	John Downie	11,685	34.6	2
East Ham South	Alfred Barnes	18,949	59.3	1
East Renfrewshire	J. Barr	21,475	34.0	2
Edmonton	Frank Broad	21,940	55.2	1
Finsbury	George Saville Woods	13,408	55.8	1
Glasgow St Rollox	William Leonard	16,708	61.6	1
Glasgow Tradeston	Thomas Henderson	12,253	47.1	1
Greenwich	Joseph Reeves	20,436	47.6	2
Kettering	J. R. Sadler	21,042	47.9	2
Mossley	Herbert Gibson	22,399	47.7	2
Nottingham Central	William Allitt	10,193	35.3	2
Paddington North	Caroline Ganley	9,925	34.4	2
Sheffield Hillsborough	A. V. Alexander	21,025	54.3	1
Tottenham North	Robert Morrison	21,075	57.2	1
Twickenham	Percy Holman	22,823	37.8	2

Candidates stood jointly with the Labour Party.

=== 1945 general election ===
Constituency	Candidate	Votes	%	Position
Battersea South	Caroline Ganley	19,275	61.5	1
Bethnal Green North East	Daniel Chater	7,696	59.9	1
Bethnal Green South West	Percy Holman	6,669	57.4	1
Birmingham Deritend	Fred Longden	9,749	65.3	1
Birmingham Duddeston	Edith Agnes Wills	10,745	65.0	1
Bradford South	Meredith Titterington	24,394	52.5	1
Bristol North	Will Coldrick	22,819	57.8	1
Dartford	Norman Dodds	36,665	68.4	1
Dumfriesshire	David Dunwoodie	12,388	35.7	2
Ealing West	James Hindle Hudson	29,115	60.3	1
East Fife	Samuel McLaren	10,920	30.6	2
East Ham North	Percy Daines	18,373	70.2	1
East Ham South	Alfred Barnes	19,168	74.0	1
East Renfrewshire	Daniel McArthur	36,634	46.4	2
Glasgow Partick	George Younger	12,998	48.4	2
Glasgow St Rollox	William Leonard	14,520	62.9	1
Glasgow Springburn	John Forman	21,698	65.0	1
Glasgow Tradeston	John Rankin	13,153	59.7	1
Hammersmith South	William Thomas Adams	12,502	58.0	1
Howdenshire	Tom Neville	11,161	29.2	2
Ilford North	Mabel Ridealgh	18,833	42.8	1
Lewes	Albert Oram	18,511	36.3	2
Liverpool West Derby	Dick Lewis	18,370	45.7	2
Mossley	George Woods	27,435	47.5	1
Newcastle-upon-Tyne North	W. Henry Shackleton	10,228	29.8	2
Nottingham South	Norman Smith	15,316	50.5	1
Peterborough	Stanley Tiffany	22,056	50.7	1
Sheffield Hillsborough	A. V. Alexander	24,959	63.4	1
Tottenham North	Robert Morrison	25,360	71.8	1
Uxbridge	Frank Beswick	25,190	43.7	1
Wallasey	Thomas Findley	9,879	23.0	3
Wolverhampton Bilston	Will Nally	31,493	67.0	1
Wood Green	Walter Armstrong Vant	23,544	34.7	2
Worcester	John Evans	13,519	42.9	2

Candidates stood jointly with the Labour Party.

=== By-election, 1945–1950 ===
Constituency	Candidate	Votes	%	Position
Howdenshire by-election, 1947	Tom Neville	9,298	25.5	2
Hammersmith South by-election, 1949	Thomas Williams	15,223	52.8	1

=== 1950 general election ===
Constituency	Candidate	Votes	%	Position
Banbury	Cyril Rawlett Fenton	19,408	39.5	2
Battersea South	Caroline Ganley	16,142	46.3	1
Bethnal Green	Percy Holman	20,519	63.1	1
Billericay	Albert Oram	19,437	41.3	2
Bilston	Will Nally	29,919	62.6	1
Birmingham Small Heath	Fred Longden	31,985	62.8	1
Bridgwater	Norman Carr	16,053	36.1	2
Bristol North East	Will Coldrick	20,456	49.4	1
Dartford	Norman Dodds	38,128	56.4	1
Dover	Will Owen	24,995	46.7	2
Droylsden	George Woods	25,238	48.7	1
Ealing North	James Hindle Hudson	24,157	47.6	1
East Fife	Samuel McLaren	10,694	26.5	2
East Ham North	Percy Daines	20,497	57.1	1
East Ham South	Alfred Barnes	23,002	62.1	1
Edinburgh West	C. Morgan	14,377	32.0	2
Glasgow Scotstoun	William Bargh	19,055	46.0	2
Glasgow Springburn	John Forman	25,603	59.7	1
Glasgow Tradeston	John Rankin	26,598	62.9	1
Glasgow Woodside	William Leonard	15,966	45.6	2
Hammersmith South	Thomas Williams	18,825	51.8	1
Ilford North	Mabel Ridealgh	21,385	37.3	2
Nottingham South	Norman Smith	18,806	48.0	1
Peterborough	Stanley Tiffany	22,671	45.7	2
Reigate	Charles Garnsworthy	13,931	32.5	2
Sheffield Hillsborough	George Darling	28,295	58.7	1
Southend West	Eric Hutchison	15,345	25.9	2
Tottenham	Frederick Messer	30,901	56.9	1
Uxbridge	Frank Beswick	20,139	48.1	1
Wembley North	Bernard Lewis	14,987	34.7	2
Winchester	Louis Frederick Cornillie	23,955	43.2	2
Wood Green	William Irving	28,480	52.4	1
Worcester	John Evans	19,807	40.6	2

Candidates stood jointly with the Labour Party.

=== By-elections, 1950–1951 ===
Election	Candidate	Votes	%	Position
1950 Glasgow Scotstoun by-election	William Bargh	17,175	47.3	2

=== 1951 general election ===
Constituency	Candidate	Votes	%	Position
Barnet	Cyril Fenton	22,375	35.9	2
Battersea South	Caroline Ganley	17,237	49.3	2
Bebington	Edward W. Harby	22,190	38.7	2
Berwick-upon-Tweed	Thomas Jones	11,069	33.1	2
Bethnal Green	Percy Holman	22,162	69.7	1
Billericay	Brian Ralph Clapham	20,613	43.4	2
Bilston	Will Nally	31,381	61.9	1
Birmingham Small Heath	Fred Longden	31,079	63.4	1
Bridgwater	Norman Carr	19,656	43.7	1
Bristol North East	Will Coldrick	21,910	53.0	1
Cardiff North	John Evans	22,600	43.5	2
Chertsey	Dennis Gordon	14,849	38.7	1
Dartford	Norman Dodds	40,094	59.1	1
Dover	Will Owen	24,995	46.7	2
Ealing North	James Hindle Hudson	25,698	50.1	1
East Ham North	Percy Daines	21,444	60.4	1
East Ham South	Alfred Barnes	23,704	64.9	1
Glasgow Springburn	John Forman	27,749	62.4	1
Glasgow Tradeston	John Rankin	29,966	63.1	1
Glasgow Woodside	Richard McCutcheon	16,210	46.6	2
Hammersmith South	Thomas Williams	19,273	54.6	1
Hertford	Richard Marsh	23,708	43.7	2
Ilford North	Mabel Ridealgh	21,865	38.0	2
Leicester South East	Ewart Taylor	16,225	40.5	2
Liverpool Toxteth	William Lawn	19,620	45.8	2
Merton and Morden	Arthur Palmer	22,086	45.5	2
Middlesbrough West	David Dunwoodie	22,525	47.8	2
Nottingham South	Norman Smith	19,844	50.6	1
Putney	Eric Hutchison	23,489	44.2	2
Reigate	Charles Garnsworthy	14,287	33.1	2
Ruislip-Northwood	Thomas Parker	14,491	36.4	2
St Ives	Arthur Maddison	11,216	31.8	2
Sheffield Hillsborough	George Darling	28,274	59.0	1
Sudbury and Woodbridge	Dick Lewis	21,310	43.9	2
Tottenham	Frederick Messer	33,312	62.4	1
Uxbridge	Frank Beswick	21,249	49.1	1
Wembley North	Bernard Lewis	15,394	35.7	2
Wood Green	William Irving	30,360	55.8	1

=== By-elections, 1951–1955 ===
Election	Candidate	Votes	%	Position
1952 Birmingham Small Heath by-election	William Wheeldon	19,491	67.0	1
1953 Stoke-on-Trent North by-election	Harriet Slater	23,103	75.5	1
1954 Liverpool West Derby by-election	Cyril Fenton	18,650	46.9	2
1954 Morpeth by-election	Will Owen	23,491	71.3	1

=== 1955 general election ===
Constituency	Candidate	Votes	%	Position
Barons Court	Thomas Williams	20,748	50.2	1
Bath	Thomas W. Richardson	17,646	37.4	2
Bethnal Green	Percy Holman	27,205	69.3	1
Billericay	Brian Ralph Clapham	20,121	45.3	2
Bilston	Robert Edwards	26,490	57.6	1
Birmingham Small Heath	William Wheeldon	22,444	60.8	1
Bradford West	M. Ferguson	19,147	46.2	2
Bristol North East	Will Coldrick	22,740	46.5	1
Burton	Ewart Taylor	21,546	46.8	2
Chigwell	Douglas Clark	17,628	47.5	2
Cleveland	Arthur Palmer	27,649	50.2	1
Colchester	Norman Thomas	19,898	44.5	2
Dartford	Sydney Irving	25,928	54.4	1
Ealing North	James Hindle Hudson	22,794	46.0	2
East Ham North	Percy Daines	17,961	59.1	1
East Ham South	Albert Oram	19,808	64.1	1
East Hertfordshire	William Hilton	20,418	43.1	2
Erith and Crayford	Norman Dodds	24,957	60.4	1
Glasgow Govan	John Rankin	24,818	62.0	1
Glasgow Scotstoun	Howell James	18,226	49.4	2
Glasgow Springburn	John Forman	16,131	57.5	1
Liverpool Toxteth	William Lawn	16,037	43.8	2
Liverpool West Derby	Cyril Fenton	18,540	46.7	2
Middlesbrough West	Rita Smythe	18,134	41.6	2
Morpeth	Will Owen	25,452	70.6	1
Nottingham South	Norman Smith	22,092	43.1	2
Putney	Bernard Bagnari	21,774	42.9	2
Reigate	Charles Garnsworthy	16,903	38.3	2
Romford	Ron Ledger	27,326	52.5	1
Sheffield Hillsborough	George Darling	23,438	58.8	1
South East Essex	Edward Harby	13,841	40.3	2
Stoke-on-Trent North	Harriet Slater	29,473	66.9	1
Sudbury and Woodbridge	Dick Lewis	17,995	38.3	2
Tottenham	Frederick Messer	26,363	60.0	1
Uxbridge	Frank Beswick	22,244	51.0	1
Wembley South	Eric Hutchison	15,596	41.4	2
West Renfrewshire	Dickson Mabon	17,243	44.8	2
Wolverhampton South West	Lewis Burgess	16,898	40.0	2
Wood Green	Joyce Butler	25,523	53.9	1

=== By-elections 1955–1959 ===
Election	Candidate	Votes	%	Position
1955 Greenock by-election	Dickson Mabon	19,698	53.7	1
1957 Wednesbury by-election	John Stonehouse	22,235	62.2	1

=== 1959 general election ===
Constituency	Candidate	Votes	%	Position
Barons Court	Thomas Williams	17,745	46.5	2
Battersea South	Geoffrey William Rhodes	12,451	42.3	2
Bethnal Green	Percy Holman	24,228	63.6	1
Billericay	Rita Smythe	24,402	38.8	2
Bilston	Robert Edwards	27,068	53.5	1
Birmingham Small Heath	William Wheeldon	19,213	57.4	1
Bristol North East	Will Coldrick	21,574	42.4	2
Cleveland	Arthur Palmer	28,790	48.6	2
Dartford	Sydney Irving	25,323	45.8	1
Ealing North	William Hilton	23,036	45.8	2
East Ham South	Albert Oram	18,230	61.5	1
Epping	Donald Ford	27,114	38.4	2
Erith and Crayford	Norman Dodds	24,523	56.7	1
Glasgow Govan	John Rankin	23,139	60.4	1
Glasgow Springburn	John Forman	16,297	58.8	1
Greenock	Dickson Mabon	19,320	50.6	1
Hendon North	Cecil Genese	16,566	38.5	2
Henley	Arthur Ledger	15,014	32.9	2
Liverpool Kirkdale	Thomas Hockton	19,669	46.7	2
Luton	Cyril Fenton	22,134	44.9	2
Manchester Wythenshawe	Alf Morris	27,625	48.9	2
Mitcham	Eric Smythe	23,845	41.5	2
Morpeth	Will Owen	27,435	71.9	1
Romford	Ron Ledger	25,558	43.5	1
Sheffield Hillsborough	George Darling	21,888	56.5	1
Stoke-on-Trent North	Harriet Slater	29,336	64.0	1
Uxbridge	Frank Beswick	20,970	43.6	2
Wednesbury	John Stonehouse	24,157	52.1	1
Willesden West	Laurence Pavitt	25,680	57.2	1
Wood Green	Joyce Butler	22,869	51.3	1

=== By-elections, 1959–1964 ===
Election	Candidate	Votes	%	Position
1961 Warrington by-election	Thomas Williams	16,149	55.8	1

=== 1964 general election ===
Constituency	Candidate	Votes	%	Position
Bethnal Green	Percy Holman	19,914	64.6	1
Billericay	Rita Smythe	33,755	42.3	2
Bilston	Robert Edwards	27,986	53.1	1
Birmingham Yardley	Ioan Evans	22,788	50.2	1
Bradford West	Norman Haseldine	17,974	46.0	2
Bristol Central	Arthur Palmer	16,207	54.5	1
Croydon North East	Donald Storer	16,099	37.8	2
Dartford	Sydney Irving	27,371	46.5	1
Eastbourne	Joan Baker	12,034	22.3	3
East Ham South	Albert Oram	17,069	66.0	1
Erith and Crayford	Norman Dodds	22,806	53.1	1
Glasgow Govan	John Rankin	20,326	65.0	1
Greenock	Dickson Mabon	19,627	55.1	1
Henley	Arthur Ledger	16,614	32.8	2
Manchester Wythenshawe	Alf Morris	26,870	47.7	1
Morpeth	Will Owen	25,223	74.4	1
Newcastle upon Tyne East	Geoffrey Rhodes	21,200	52.0	1
Romford	Ron Ledger	27,143	47.5	1
Rutland and Stamford	Victor Butler	15,704	46.6	2
Sheffield Hillsborough	George Darling	22,071	62.4	1
South Angus	Dick Douglas	7,590	22.6	2
Stoke-on-Trent North	Harriet Slater	27,584	64.7	1
Warrington	Thomas Williams	20,551	57.1	1
Wednesbury	John Stonehouse	23,473	53.7	1
Weston-super-Mare	Jessie Stephen	12,248	23.9	2
Willesden West	Laurence Pavitt	23,862	62.8	1
Wood Green	Joyce Butler	22,131	56.6	1

=== 1966 general election ===
Constituency	Candidate	Votes	%	Position
Bethnal Green	William Hilton	20,178	69.7	1
Bilston	Robert Edwards	29,794	56.9	1
Birmingham Yardley	Ioan Evans	25,568	56.3	1
Bradford West	Norman Haseldine	18,170	52.0	1
Bridlington	John Tomlinson	11,939	29.7	1
Bristol Central	Arthur Palmer	15,399	58.9	1
Dartford	Sydney Irving	29,547	49.8	1
East Ham South	Albert Oram	17,543	69.9	1
Edinburgh West	Dick Douglas	20,073	39.0	2
Enfield West	Ted Graham	10,518	27.4	2
Glasgow Govan	John Rankin	18,533	67.8	1
Greenock	Dickson Mabon	18,988	57.1	1
Hexham	James Lamb	16,105	37.1	2
Manchester Wythenshawe	Alf Morris	27,485	53.1	1
Morpeth	Will Owen	25,223	74.4	1
Newcastle upon Tyne East	Geoffrey Rhodes	22,408	59.8	1
Romford	Ron Ledger	31,221	57.4	1
Rutland and Stamford	Victor Butler	15,704	46.6	2
Sheffield Hillsborough	George Darling	22,799	67.9	1
Warrington	Thomas Williams	21,930	64.7	1
Wednesbury	John Stonehouse	26,041	58.9	1
Weston-super-Mare	Melvyn Butcher	15,340	28.8	2
Willesden West	Laurence Pavitt	24,944	68.5	1
Wood Green	Joyce Butler	21,922	60.8	1

=== 1970 general election ===
Constituency	Candidate	Votes	%	Position
Ayr	James Craigen	17,770	42.1	2
Barnet	Joan Baker	18,166	35.4	2
Berwick-on-Tweed	Bob Wareing	8,413	27.4	2
Bethnal Green	William Hilton	15,483	64.2	1
Bexley	John Cartwright	19,017	37.2	2
Bilston	Robert Edwards	27,240	50.9	1
Birmingham Yardley	Ioan Evans	21,707	49.9	2
Bradford West	Norman Haseldine	18,936	48.0	2
Bristol Central	Arthur Palmer	12,375	51.4	1
Clackmannan and East Stirlingshire	Dick Douglas	23,729	50.7	1
Dartford	Sydney Irving	19,803	42.0	1
East Ham South	Albert Oram	13,638	61.9	1
East Hertfordshire	Mike Thomas	23,601	34.3	2
Enfield West	Herbert King	9,896	26.2	2
Farnworth	John Roper	29,392	58.5	1
Glasgow Govan	John Rankin	13,443	60.1	1
Greenock	Dickson Mabon	19,334	53.7	1
Ilford North	Christopher William Sewell	16,563	32.3	2
Manchester Wythenshawe	Alf Morris	30,260	55.3	1
Newcastle-upon-Tyne East	Geoffrey Rhodes	20,780	58.4	1
Portsmouth Langstone	Roger Kenward	26,492	32.9	2
Sheffield Hillsborough	George Darling	18,775	62.1	1
Southgate	Robert Brian Bastin	9,389	24.8	2
Warrington	Thomas Williams	20,970	64.3	1
Wednesbury	John Stonehouse	23,998	53.8	1
Weston-super-Mare	Sarah Palmer	14,473	24.8	2
Willesden West	Laurence Pavitt	24,944	68.5	1
Wood Green	Joyce Butler	18,666	57.1	1

=== February 1974 general election ===
Constituency	Candidate	Votes	%	Position
Aberdare	Ioan Evans	23,805	59.5	1
Beeston	Antony Gardner	23,943	38.3	2
Bexleyheath	John Cartwright	14,675	34.3	2
Brent South	Laurence Pavitt	22,975	53.0	1
Bristol North East	Arthur Palmer	18,625	47.4	1
Clackmannan and Eastern Stirlingshire	Dick Douglas	18,679	36.4	2
Dartford	Sydney Irving	19,803	42.0	1
Edmonton	Ted Graham	20,837	45.3	1
Farnworth	John Roper	28,068	49.8	1
Glasgow Maryhill	James Craigen	20,303	56.6	1
Greenock and Port Glasgow	Dickson Mabon	20,565	48.3	1
Harlow	Stan Newens	25,814	49.5	1
Lewes	James Little	10,875	18.9	3
Manchester Wythenshawe	Alf Morris	26,900	55.7	1
Newcastle upon Tyne East	Geoffrey Rhodes	20,439	58.8	1
Northwich	S. G. Benyon	13,485	30.9	2
Rochester and Chatham	Roger Kenward	23,483	37.4	2
Stroud	Bill Maddocks	17,148	29.2	2
Thornaby	Ian Wrigglesworth	21,503	43.8	1
Walsall North	John Stonehouse	32,458	63.6	1
Warrington	Thomas Williams	19,550	57.2	1
Welwyn and Hatfield	Christopher Sewell	21,166	37.4	2
Weston-super-Mare	Roy Morris	13,542	20.0	3
Wolverhampton South East	Bob Edwards	21,746	54.9	1
Wood Green	Joyce Butler	18,594	50.6	1

=== October 1974 general election ===
Constituency	Candidate	Votes	%	Position
Aberdare	Ioan Evans	24,197	63.3	1
Ayr	Robin Stewart	14,268	34.6	2
Beeston	Antony Gardner	24,974	41.8	2
Brent South	Laurence Pavitt	21,611	57.7	1
Bristol North East	Arthur Palmer	19,647	53.1	1
Clackmannan and Eastern Stirlingshire	Dick Douglas	18,657	36.4	2
Dartford	Sydney Irving	20,817	47.6	1
Edinburgh Pentlands	George Foulkes	12,826	30.9	2
Edmonton	Ted Graham	20,229	49.1	1
Farnworth	John Roper	28,184	53.5	1
Glasgow Maryhill	James Craigen	19,589	57.6	1
Greenock and Port Glasgow	Dickson Mabon	21,279	48.2	1
Harlow	Stan Newens	24,961	52.7	1
Lewes	James Little	11,857	22.3	3
Liverpool Wavertree	Roy Morris	16,216	39.2	2
Manchester Wythenshawe	Alf Morris	26,448	59.1	1
Stroud	Bill Maddocks	17,352	31.1	2
Thornaby	Ian Wrigglesworth	22,130	49.1	1
Walsall North	John Stonehouse	28,340	59.5	1
Warrington	Thomas Williams	19,882	62.8	1
Weston-super-Mare	Peter Owen	14,057	22.1	3
Wolverhampton South East	Bob Edwards	21,466	58.7	1
Wood Green	Joyce Butler	16,605	51.3	1

=== By-elections, 1974–1979 ===
Election	Candidate	Votes	%	Position
1978 Lambeth Central by-election	John Tilley	10,311	49.4	1

=== 1979 general election ===
Constituency	Candidate	Votes	%	Position
Aberdare	Ioan Evans	26,716	71.6	1
Altrincham and Sale	Garth Pratt	14,643	25.3	2
Brent South	Laurence Pavitt	24,178	59.4	1
Bristol North East	Arthur Palmer	19,337	51.6	1
Cardiff North West	Peter Owen	11,663	33.2	2
Dartford	Sydney Irving	19,803	42.9	2
Dunfermline	Dick Douglas	22,803	44.3	1
East Hertfordshire	I. J. Evans	20,139	26.9	2
Edmonton	Ted Graham	20,713	47.1	1
Farnworth	John Roper	27,965	50.1	1
Glasgow Maryhill	James Craigen	22,602	66.2	1
Greenock and Port Glasgow	Dickson Mabon	24,071	53.0	1
Harlow	Stan Newens	22,698	42.7	1
Huddersfield East	Barry Sheerman	19,040	47.5	1
Lambeth Central	John Tilley	15,101	54.7	1
Liverpool Wavertree	Roy Morris	14,828	34.2	2
Manchester Wythenshawe	Alf Morris	26,860	59.1	1
Newcastle upon Tyne East	Mike Thomas	18,257	55.1	1
St Albans	Ronald Greaves	13,638	23.1	3
South Ayrshire	George Foulkes	14,271	35.2	1
Thornaby	Ian Wrigglesworth	23,597	51.1	1
Totnes	John Duffin	7,668	11.4	3
Warrington	Thomas Williams	19,306	61.6	1
Weston-super-Mare	Alan Taylor	14,420	20.2	3
Wolverhampton South East	Bob Edwards	20,798	55.7	1

=== By-elections, 1979–1983 ===
Election	Candidate	Votes	%	Position
1983 Darlington by-election	Ossie O'Brien	20,544	39.5	1

=== 1983 general election ===
Constituency	Candidate	Votes	%	Position
Brent South	Laurence Pavitt	21,259	53.3	1
Bristol North West	Sarah Palmer	18,290	32.6	2
Carrick, Cumnock and Doon Valley	George Foulkes	21,394	51.5	1
Cynon Valley	Ioan Evans	20,668	56.0	1
Darlington	Ossie O'Brien	18,996	37.8	2
Dunfermline West	Dick Douglas	12,998	36.0	1
Edmonton	Ted Graham	17,775	39.8	2
Glasgow Maryhill	James Craigen	18,724	55.2	1
Harlow	Stan Newens	18,250	34.2	2
Huddersfield	Barry Sheerman	20,051	41.4	1
Loughborough	Mike Jones	12,876	23.4	2
Manchester Wythenshawe	Alf Morris	23,172	54.6	1
North Warwickshire	John Tomlinson	19,867	37.1	2
Nottingham East	Martyn Sloman	16,177	37.1	2
Richmond (Yorks)	Barbara Hawkins	4,997	09.7	3
Wallasey	James Robertson	16,146	32.5	2
Wolverhampton South East	Bob Edwards	17,440	44.7	1

=== 1987 general election ===
Constituency	Candidate	Votes	%	Position
Bolton West	Guy Harkin	20,186	36.1	2
Cardiff South and Penarth	Alun Michael	20,956	46.7	1
Carrick, Cumnock and Doon Valley	George Foulkes	25,669	60.1	1
Darlington	Ossie O'Brien	22,170	41.6	2
Dumbarton	John McFall	19,778	43.0	1
Dunfermline West	Dick Douglas	18,493	47.1	1
Ellesmere Port and Neston	Helen Jones	23,811	41.2	2
Glasgow Rutherglen	Tommy McAvoy	24,790	56.0	1
Harlow	Stan Newens	20,140	36.6	2
Hertford and Stortford	Patricia Sumner	7,494	12.8	3
Huddersfield	Barry Sheerman	23,019	45.9	1
Kirkcaldy	Lewis Moonie	20,281	49.6	1
Loughborough	Christopher Wrigley	14,283	24.5	2
Manchester Wythenshawe	Alf Morris	23,881	56.8	1
Portsmouth North	David Miles	12,016	20.0	3
St Albans	Tony McWalter	6,922	11.5	3
Southend West	Angela Smith	3,899	07.6	3
Weston-super-Mare	Paul Loach	6,584	11.4	3
Wolverhampton South East	Dennis Turner	19,760	48.9	1

=== By-elections, 1987–1992 ===
Election	Candidate	Votes	%	Position
Paisley South	Gordon McMaster	12,485	46.1	1

=== 1992 general election ===
Constituency	Candidate	Votes	%	Position
Bristol North West	Doug Naysmith	25,309	42.3	1
Canterbury	Fred Whitemore	8,936	15.2	3
Cardiff Central	Jon Owen Jones	18,014	42.0	1
Cardiff South and Penarth	Alun Michael	26,383	55.5	1
Carrick, Cumnock and Doon Valley	George Foulkes	25,142	59.1	1
Dumbarton	John McFall	19,255	43.6	1
Ealing North	Martin Stears	18,932	37.8	2
Edinburgh Pentlands	Mark Lazarowicz	13,838	31.1	2
Edmonton	Andy Love	21,483	45.0	2
Feltham and Heston	Alan Keen	27,660	46.1	1
Glasgow Govan	Ian Davidson	17,051	49.0	1
Glasgow Rutherglen	Tommy McAvoy	21,962	55.4	1
Grantham	Steven Taggart	17,606	26.6	2
Huddersfield	Barry Sheerman	23,832	48.7	1
Ilford South	Mike Gapes	19,418	45.4	1
Kettering	Phil Hope	17,961	32.1	2
Kirkcaldy	Lewis Moonie	17,887	46.0	1
Manchester Wythenshawe	Alf Morris	22,591	60.5	1
Meriden	Nick Stephens	18,763	30.9	2
New Forest	M. J. Shutler	4,989	08.2	3
Paisley South	Gordon McMaster	18,202	50.7	1
Plymouth Drake	Peter Telford	15,062	38.6	2
South East Cornwall	Linda Gilroy	5,536	09.2	3
Southwark and Bermondsey	Richard Balfe	11,614	30.8	2
Wantage	Vivian Woodell	10,955	19.4	2
Wolverhampton North East	Ken Purchase	24,106	49.3	1
Wolverhampton South East	Dennis Turner	23,215	56.7	1

=== By-elections, 1992–1997 ===
Election	Candidate	Votes	%	Position
1995 Islwyn by-election	Don Touhig	16,030	69.2	1

=== 1997 general election ===
Constituency	Candidate	Votes	%	Position
Basildon	Angela Smith	29,646	55.8	1
Brighton Pavilion	David Lepper	26,737	54.6	1
Bristol North West	Doug Naysmith	27,575	49.9	1
Cardiff Central	Jon Owen Jones	18,464	43.7	1
Cardiff South and Penarth	Alun Michael	22,647	53.4	1
Carrick, Cumnock and Doon Valley	George Foulkes	29,398	59.8	1
Corby	Phil Hope	29,888	55.4	1
Dumbarton	John McFall	20,470	49.6	1
Edmonton	Andy Love	27,029	60.3	1
Feltham and Heston	Alan Keen	27,836	59.7	1
Glasgow Pollok	Ian Davidson	19,653	59.9	1
Glasgow Rutherglen	Tommy McAvoy	20,430	57.5	1
Hemel Hempstead	Tony McWalter	25,175	45.7	1
Heywood and Middleton	Jim Dobbin	29,179	57.7	1
Huddersfield	Barry Sheerman	25,171	56.5	1
Ilford South	Mike Gapes	29,273	58.5	1
Islwyn	Don Touhig	26,995	74.2	1
Kirkcaldy	Lewis Moonie	18,730	53.6	1
Liverpool Riverside	Louise Ellman	26,858	70.4	1
Loughborough	Andy Reed	25,448	48.6	1
North West Leicestershire	David Taylor	29,332	56.4	1
Paisley South	Gordon McMaster	21,482	57.5	1
Plymouth Sutton	Linda Gilroy	23,881	50.1	1
Stroud	David Drew	26,170	42.7	1
Wolverhampton North East	Ken Purchase	24,534	59.2	1
Wolverhampton South East	Dennis Turner	22,202	63.7	1

=== By-elections, 1997–2001 ===
Election	Candidate	Votes	%	Position
2000 Preston by-election	Mark Hendrick	9,765	45.7	1
2000 West Bromwich West by-election	Adrian Bailey	9,460	50.6	1

=== 2001 general election ===
Constituency	Candidate	Votes	%	Position
Basildon	Angela Smith	21,551	52.7	1
Brighton Pavilion	David Lepper	19,846	48.7	1
Bristol North West	Doug Naysmith	24,236	52.1	1
Cardiff Central	Jon Owen Jones	13,451	38.6	1
Cardiff South and Penarth	Alun Michael	20,094	56.2	1
Carrick, Cumnock and Doon Valley	George Foulkes	22,174	55.3	1
Corby	Phil Hope	23,283	49.3	1
Dumbarton	John McFall	16,151	47.5	1
Edinburgh North and Leith	Mark Lazarowicz	15,271	45.9	1
Edmonton	Andy Love	20,481	58.9	1
Feltham and Heston	Alan Keen	21,406	59.2	1
Glasgow Pollok	Ian Davidson	15,497	61.3	1
Glasgow Rutherglen	Tommy McAvoy	16,760	57.4	1
Harrow West	Gareth Thomas	23,142	49.6	1
Hemel Hempstead	Tony McWalter	21,389	46.6	1
Heywood and Middleton	Jim Dobbin	22,377	57.7	1
Huddersfield	Barry Sheerman	18,840	53.2	1
Ilford South	Mike Gapes	24,619	59.6	1
Islwyn	Don Touhig	19,505	61.5	1
Kirkcaldy	Lewis Moonie	15,227	54.1	1
Liverpool Riverside	Louise Ellman	18,201	71.4	1
Loughborough	Andy Reed	22,016	49.7	1
North West Leicestershire	David Taylor	23,431	52.1	1
Plymouth Sutton	Linda Gilroy	19,827	50.7	1
Preston	Mark Hendrick	20,540	57.0	1
Sheffield Heeley	Meg Munn	19,452	57.0	1
Stroud	David Drew	25,685	46.6	1
West Bromwich West	Adrian Bailey	19,352	60.8	1
Wolverhampton North East	Ken Purchase	18,984	60.3	1
Wolverhampton South East	Dennis Turner	18,409	67.4	1

=== 2005 general election ===
Constituency	Candidate	Votes	%	Position
Basildon	Angela Smith	18,720	43.4	1
Brighton Pavilion	David Lepper	15,427	35.4	1
Bristol North West	Doug Naysmith	22,192	46.7	1
Cardiff Central	Jon Owen Jones	12,398	34.3	2
Cardiff South and Penarth	Alun Michael	17,447	47.3	1
Corby	Phil Hope	20,913	43.1	1
Edinburgh North and Leith	Mark Lazarowicz	14,597	34.2	1
Edmonton	Andy Love	18,456	53.2	1
Feltham and Heston	Alan Keen	17,741	47.6	1
Glasgow South West	Ian Davidson	18,653	60.2	1
Hackney South and Shoreditch	Meg Hillier	17,048	52.9	1
Halifax	Linda Riordan	16,579	41.8	1
Harrow West	Gareth Thomas	20,298	42.5	1
Hemel Hempstead	Tony McWalter	18,501	39.3	2
Heywood and Middleton	Jim Dobbin	19,438	49.8	1
Huddersfield	Barry Sheerman	16,341	46.8	1
Ilford South	Mike Gapes	20,856	48.9	1
Islwyn	Don Touhig	19,687	63.8	1
Liverpool Riverside	Louise Ellman	17,951	57.6	1
Loughborough	Andy Reed	19,098	41.4	1
Normanton	Ed Balls	19,161	51.2	1
North West Leicestershire	David Taylor	21,449	45.5	1
Plymouth Sutton	Linda Gilroy	15,497	40.6	1
Portsmouth North	Sarah McCarthy-Fry	15,412	40.9	21
Preston	Mark Hendrick	17,210	50.5	1
Rutherglen and Hamilton West	Tommy McAvoy	24,054	55.6	1
Sheffield Heeley	Meg Munn	18,405	54.0	1
Stratford upon Avon	Rachel Blackmore	10,145	28.3	2
Stroud	David Drew	22,527	39.6	1
West Bromwich	Adrian Bailey	18,951	54.3	1
West Dunbartonshire	John McFall	21,600	51.9	1
Wolverhampton North East	Ken Purchase	17,948	54.5	1

=== 2010 general election ===
Constituency	Candidate	Votes	%	Position
Barrow and Furness	John Woodcock	21,226	48.1	1
Bermondsey and Old Southwark	Val Shawcross	13,060	29.2	2
Brighton Kemptown	Simon Burgess	14,889	34.9	2
Cardiff South and Penarth	Alun Michael	17,262	38.9	1
Corby	Phil Hope	20,935	38.6	2
Croydon Central	Gerry Ryan	16,688	33.6	2
Dumfriesshire, Clydesdale and Tweeddale	Claudia Beamish	13,263	28.9	2
Edinburgh North and Leith	Mark Lazarowicz	17,740	37.5	1
Edmonton	Andy Love	21,665	53.7	1
Feltham and Heston	Alan Keen	21,174	43.6	1
Glasgow South West	Ian Davidson	19,863	62.5	1
Gravesham	Kathryn Smith	13,644	28.8	2
Hackney South and Shoreditch	Meg Hillier	23,888	55.7	1
Halifax	Linda Riordan	16,278	37.4	1
Harrow West	Gareth Thomas	20,111	43.6	1
Heywood and Middleton	Jim Dobbin	18,499	40.1	1
Huddersfield	Barry Sheerman	15,725	38.8	1
Ilford South	Mike Gapes	25,311	49.4	1
Islwyn	Chris Evans	17,069	49.2	1
Kilmarnock and Loudon	Cathy Jamieson	24,460	52.5	1
Liverpool Riverside	Louise Ellman	22,998	59.3	1
Liverpool Wavertree	Luciana Berger	20,132	53.1	1
Liverpool West Derby	Stephen Twigg	22,953	64.1	1
Loughborough	Andy Reed	18,227	34.5	2
Luton South	Gavin Shuker	14,725	34.9	1
Milton Keynes North	Andrew Pakes	14,458	26.8	2
Morley and Outwood	Ed Balls	18,365	37.6	1
Norwich North	John Cook	13,379	31.4	2
Nottingham East	Chris Leslie	15,022	45.4	1
Plymouth Sutton and Devonport	Linda Gilroy	13,901	31.7	2
Portsmouth North	Sarah McCarthy-Fry	12,244	27.8	2
Preston	Mark Hendrick	15,668	48.2	1
Rutherglen and Hamilton West	Tom Greatrex	28,566	60.8	1
Sheffield Heeley	Meg Munn	17,409	42.6	1
South Basildon and East Thurrock	Angela Smith	13,852	31.0	2
Stalybridge and Hyde	Jonathan Reynolds	16,189	39.6	1
Stevenage	Sharon Taylor	14,913	33.4	2
Stroud	David Drew	22,380	38.6	2
Swansea West	Geraint Davies	12,335	34.7	1
Walthamstow	Stella Creasy	21,252	51.8	1
West Bromwich West	Adrian Bailey	16,263	45.0	1
West Dunbartonshire	Gemma Doyle	25,905	61.3	1
The Wrekin	Paul Kalinauckas	12,472	27.1	2

=== By-elections, 2010–2015 ===
Election	Candidate	Votes	%	Position
2011 Leicester South by-election	Jon Ashworth	19,771	57.8	1
2011 Feltham and Heston by-election	Seema Malhotra	12,639	54.4	1
2012 Cardiff South and Penarth by-election	Stephen Doughty	9,193	47.3	1
2012 Corby by-election	Andy Sawford	17,267	48.4	1
2012 Manchester Central by-election	Lucy Powell	11,507	69.1	1
2012 Croydon North by-election	Steve Reed	15,898	64.7	1

=== 2015 general election ===
Constituency	Candidate	Votes	%	Position
Aberdeen North	Richard Baker	11,397	25.9	2
Barrow and Furness	John Woodcock	18,320	42.3	1
Cardiff South and Penarth	Stephen Doughty	19,966	42.8	1
Corby	Andy Sawford	21,611	38.5	2
Croydon North	Steve Reed	33,513	62.6	1
Edinburgh North and Leith	Mark Lazarowicz	18,145	31.3	2
Edmonton	Kate Osamor	25,388	61.4	1
Feltham and Heston	Seema Malhotra	25,845	52.3	1
Glasgow South West	Ian Davidson	13,438	32.8	2
Glenrothes	Melanie Ward	14,562	30.6	2
Hackney South and Shoreditch	Meg Hillier	30,633	64.4	1
Harrow West	Gareth Thomas	21,885	46.9	1
Hastings and Rye	Sarah Owen	17,890	35.1	2
Huddersfield	Barry Sheerman	18,186	44.9	1
Ilford South	Mike Gapes	33,232	64.0	1
Islwyn	Chris Evans	17,336	49.0	1
Kilmarnock and Loudoun	Cathy Jamieson	16,362	30.4	2
Kirkcaldy and Cowdenbeath	Kenny Selbie	17,654	33.4	2
Leicester South	Jon Ashworth	27,493	59.8	1
Liverpool Riverside	Louise Ellman	29,835	67.4	1
Liverpool Wavertree	Luciana Berger	28,401	69.3	1
Liverpool West Derby	Stephen Twigg	30,842	75.2	1
Luton South	Gavin Shuker	18,660	44.2	1
Manchester Central	Lucy Powell	27,772	61.3	1
Milton Keynes South	Andrew Pakes	18,929	32.1	2
Morley and Outwood	Ed Balls	18,354	38.0	2
North West Leicestershire	Jamie McMahon	14,132	27.4	2
Nottingham East	Chris Leslie	19,208	54.6	1
Plymouth Sutton and Devonport	Luke Pollard	17,597	36.7	2
Preston	Mark Hendrick	18,755	56.0	1
Redcar	Anna Turley	17,946	43.9	1
Rutherglen and Hamilton West	Tom Greatrex	20,304	35.2	2
Southampton Itchen	Rowenna Davis	16,340	36.5	2
Stalybridge and Hyde	Jonathan Reynolds	18,447	45.0	1
Stevenage	Sharon Taylor	16,336	34.2	2
Stockton South	Louise Baldock	19,175	37.0	2
Stroud	David Drew	22,947	37.7	2
Swansea West	Geraint Davies	14,967	42.6	1
Walthamstow	Stella Creasy	28,779	68.9	1
West Bromwich West	Adrian Bailey	16,578	47.3	1
West Dunbartonshire	Gemma Doyle	16,027	31.3	2
York Central	Rachael Maskell	20,212	42.4	1

=== By-elections, 2015–2017 ===
Election	Candidate	Votes	%	Position
2015 Oldham West and Royton by-election	Jim McMahon	17,209	62.1	1
2016 Batley and Spen by-election	Tracy Brabin	17,506	85.8	1
2017 Stoke-on-Trent Central by-election	Gareth Snell	7,853	37.1	1

=== 2017 general election ===
Constituency	Candidate	Votes	%	Position
Barrow and Furness	John Woodcock	22,592	47.5	1
Batley and Spen	Tracy Brabin	29,844	55.5	1
Berwickshire, Roxburgh and Selkirk	Ian Davidson	4,519	8.6	3
Birmingham Edgbaston	Preet Gill	24,124	55.3	1
Brighton Kemptown	Lloyd Russell-Moyle	28,703	58.3	1
Cardiff South and Penarth	Stephen Doughty	30,182	59.5	1
Croydon North	Steve Reed	44,213	74.2	1
Dunfermline and West Fife	Cara Hilton	17,277	33.9	2
Edinburgh North and Leith	Gordon Munro	17,618	31.1	2
Edmonton	Kate Osamor	31,221	71.5	1
Feltham and Heston	Seema Malhotra	32,462	61.2	1
Glasgow North East	Paul Sweeney	13,637	42.9	1
Glasgow South West	Matt Kerr	14,326	40.5	2
Hackney South and Shoreditch	Meg Hillier	43,974	79.4	1
Harrow West	Gareth Thomas	30,640	60.8	1
Hexham	Stephen Powers	15,760	34.1	2
Huddersfield	Barry Sheerman	26,470	60.4	1
Ilford South	Mike Gapes	43,724	75.8	1
Islwyn	Chris Evans	21,238	58.8	1
Leeds North West	Alex Sobel	20,416	44.1	1
Leicester South	Jon Ashworth	37,157	73.6	1
Leigh	Jo Platt	26,347	56.2	1
Liverpool Riverside	Louise Ellman	40,599	84.5	1
Liverpool Wavertree	Luciana Berger	34,717	79.5	1
Liverpool West Derby	Stephen Twigg	37,371	82.8	1
Luton South	Gavin Shuker	28,804	62.4	1
Manchester Central	Lucy Powell	38,490	77.4	1
Morley and Outwood	Neil Dawson	24,446	46.7	2
Neath	Christina Rees	21,713	56.7	1
Nottingham East	Chris Leslie	28,102	71.5	1
Nottingham North	Alex Norris	23,067	60.2	1
Oldham West and Royton	Jim McMahon	29,846	65.2	1
Oxford East	Anneliese Dodds	35,118	65.2	1
Plymouth Sutton and Devonport	Luke Pollard	27,283	53.3	1
Preston	Mark Hendrick	24,210	68.0	1
Pudsey	Ian MacCargo	25,219	46.7	2
Redcar	Anna Turley	23,623	55.5	1
Rutherglen and Hamilton West	Gerard Killen	19,101	37.5	1
South Swindon	Sarah Church	22,345	43.5	2
South West Devon	Philippa Davey	15,818	29.9	2
Stalybridge and Hyde	Jonathan Reynolds	24,277	57.2	1
Stevenage	Sharon Taylor	21,414	43.4	2
Stoke-on-Trent Central	Gareth Snell	17,083	51.5	1
Stone	Sam Hale	14,119	28.2	2
Stroud	David Drew	29,994	47.0	1
Swansea West	Geraint Davies	22,278	59.8	1
Swindon South	Sarah Church	22,345	43.5	2
Torridge and West Devon	Vince Barry	12,926	21.7	2
Walthamstow	Stella Creasy	38,793	80.6	1
Wantage	Rachel Eden	17,079	26.9	2
West Bromwich West	Adrian Bailey	18,789	52.1	1
York Central	Rachael Maskell	34,594	65.2	1

=== 2019 general election ===
Constituency	Candidate	Votes	%	Position
Batley and Spen	Tracy Brabin	22,594	42.7	1
Birmingham Edgbaston	Preet Gill	21,217	50.1	1
Blyth Valley	Susan Dungworth	16,728	40.9	2
Brighton Kemptown	Lloyd Russell-Moyle	25,033	51.6	1
Cardiff South and Penarth	Stephen Doughty	27,382	54.1	1
Croydon North	Steve Reed	36,495	65.6	1
Dunfermline and West Fife	Cara Hilton	13,028	24.4	2
Ealing North	James Murray	28,036	56.5	1
Edinburgh North and Leith	Gordon Munro	13,117	22.1	2
Edmonton	Kate Osamor	26,217	65.0	1
Feltham and Heston	Seema Malhotra	24,876	52.0	1
Forest of Dean	Di Martin	14,811	28.6	2
Glasgow North East	Paul Sweeney	13,363	39.2	2
Glasgow South	Johann Lamont	13,824	29.1	2
Glasgow South West	Matt Kerr	12,743	34.6	2
Gloucester	Fran Boait	18,882	35.1	2
Great Yarmouth	Mike Smith-Clare	10,930	25.1	2
Hackney South and Shoreditch	Meg Hillier	39,884	73.3	1
Harrow West	Gareth Thomas	25,132	52.4	1
Huddersfield	Barry Sheerman	20,509	49.0	1
Islwyn	Chris Evans	15,356	44.7	1
Leeds North West	Alex Sobel	23,971	48.6	1
Leicester South	Jon Ashworth	33,606	67.0	1
Leigh	Jo Platt	19,301	41.1	2
Manchester Central	Lucy Powell	36,823	70.4	1
Neath	Christina Rees	15,920	43.3	1
North Warwickshire	Claire Breeze	12,293	26.8	2
Nottingham North	Alex Norris	17,337	49.1	1
Oldham West and Royton	Jim McMahon	24,579	55.3	1
Oxford East	Anneliese Dodds	28,135	57.0	1
Penrith and The Border	Sarah Williams	10,356	21.7	2
Plymouth Moor View	Charlotte Holloway	13,934	31.5	2
Plymouth Sutton and Devonport	Luke Pollard	25,461	47.9	1
Poole	Sue Aitkenhead	10,483	20.7	2
Preston	Mark Hendrick	20,870	61.8	1
Reading West	Rachel Eden	20,276	40.2	2
Redcar	Anna Turley	15,284	37.4	2
Rutherglen and Hamilton West	Gerard Killen	18,545	34.5	2
Solihull	Nick Stephens	11,036	19.9	2
South Swindon	Sarah Church	19,911	39.2	2
Stalybridge and Hyde	Jonathan Reynolds	19,025	44.7	1
Stoke-on-Trent Central	Gareth Snell	13,887	43.3	2
Stroud	David Drew	27,742	42.1	2
Swansea West	Geraint Davies	18,493	51.6	1
Tamworth	Chris Bain	10,908	23.7	2
Vauxhall	Florence Eshalomi	31,615	56.1	1
Walthamstow	Stella Creasy	36,784	76.1	1
Witney	Rosa Bolger	8,770	14.3	3
Wrexham	Mary Wimbury	13,068	39.0	2
York Central	Rachael Maskell	27,312	55.2	1

=== By-elections, 2019–2024 ===
Election	Candidate	Votes	%	Position
2022 Wakefield by-election	Simon Lightwood	13,166	47.9	1

=== 2024 general election ===
Constituency	Candidate	Votes	%	Position
Bathgate and Linlithgow	Kirsteen Sullivan	19,774	46.9	1
Birmingham Edgbaston	Preet Gill	16,599	44.1	1
Burnley	Oliver Ryan	12,598	31.6	1
Caerphilly	Chris Evans	14,538	37.9	1
Cardiff South and Penarth	Stephen Doughty	17,428	44.2	1
Ceredigion Preseli	Jackie Jones	5,386	11.6	3
Cities of London and Westminster	Rachel Blake	15,302	38.8	1
Cramlington and Killingworth	Emma Foody	22,274	48.9	1
Derby South	Baggy Shanker	14,503	38.6	1
Doncaster Central	Sally Jameson	17,515	46.0	1
Ealing North	James Murray	20,663	47.6	1
Edmonton and Winchmore Hill	Kate Osamor	20,520	49.7	1
Feltham and Heston	Seema Malhotra	16,139	41.3	1
Gorton and Denton	Andrew Gwynne	18,555	50.5	1
Hackney South and Shoreditch	Meg Hillier	24,724	59.0	1
Halifax	Kate Dearden	14,135	35.0	1
Harlow	Chris Vince	16,313	37.5	1
Harrow West	Gareth Thomas	19,833	43.7	1
Hastings and Rye	Helena Dollimore	19,134	41.4	1
Ipswich	Jack Abbott	19,099	43.2	1
Leeds Central and Headingley	Alex Sobel	15,853	50.0	1
Leigh and Atherton	Jo Platt	19,971	48.3	1
Lothian East	Douglas Alexander	23,555	48.8	1
Manchester Central	Lucy Powell	20,184	50.6	1
Midlothian	Kirsty McNeill	21,480	48.5	1
Norwich North	Alice Macdonald	20,794	45.3	1
Nottingham North and Kimberley	Alex Norris	16,480	46.8	1
Oldham West, Chadderton and Royton	Jim McMahon	13,232	34.1	1
Oxford East	Anneliese Dodds	19,541	49.2	1
Peckham	Miatta Fahnbulleh	22,813	58.5	1
Peterborough	Andrew Pakes	13,418	31.9	1
Plymouth Sutton and Devonport	Luke Pollard	20,795	49.2	1
Preston	Mark Hendrick	14,006	34.9	1
Redcar	Anna Turley	15,663	40.9	1
Rochdale	Paul Waugh	13,027	32.7	1
Stalybridge and Hyde	Jonathan Reynolds	16,320	43.7	1
Stoke-on-Trent Central	Gareth Snell	14,950	42.2	1
Streatham and Croydon North	Steve Reed	23,232	51.9	1
Truro and Falmouth	Jayne Kirkham	20,783	41.2	1
Vauxhall and Camberwell Green	Florence Eshalomi	21,528	57.0	1
Wakefield and Rothwell	Simon Lightwood	17,773	43.6	1
Walthamstow	Stella Creasy	27,172	59.2	1
Warrington South	Sarah Hall	23,201	46.5	1
York Central	Rachael Maskell	24,537	56.3	1

=== By-elections, 2024–present ===
Election	Candidate	Votes	%	Position
2026 Makerfield by-election	Andy Burnham	24,927	54.8	1
