= Robert Taylor (Morpeth MP) =

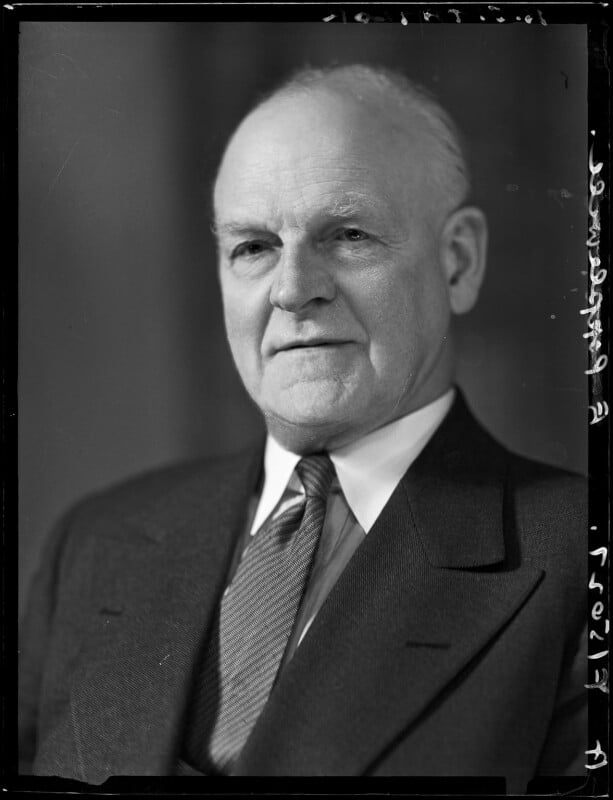
- Taylor in 1952

Member of Parliament
- In office 14 November 1935 – 19 July 1954
- Preceded by: Godfrey Nicholson
- Succeeded by: Will Owen
- Constituency: Morpeth
Government Positions
Lord of the Treasury
In office
1945 - 1951
Deputy Chief Whip
In office
1946 - 1951

Personal details
- Born: 1881 Blyth, Northumberland, United Kingdom
- Died: 19 July 1954 (aged 72–73)
- Party: Labour

Robert John Taylor (1881 – 19 July 1954) was a British Labour Party politician.

Born in Blyth, Northumberland, Taylor became a coal miner and then a checkweighman. He became active in the Labour Party, serving on Blyth Council from 1935 until 1938, and also on Northumberland County Council.

He was elected at the 1935 general election as Member of Parliament (MP) for the Morpeth constituency in Northumberland, and held the seat until his death in 1954, aged 73.

In Clement Attlee's post-war Labour Government, he was a Lord of the Treasury from 1945 to 1951, serving as Deputy Chief Whip from 1946. After Labour's defeat at the 1951 general election, he was appointed in 1952 as a Privy Counsellor.

Parliament of the United Kingdom
| Preceded by Godfrey Nicholson | Member of Parliament for Morpeth; 1935–1954 | Succeeded by Will Owen |
