= Will Owen (politician) =

British politician (1901–1981)

William James Owen (18 February 1901 – 3 April 1981) was a British miner and Labour Party politician, whose career as a Member of Parliament was ended by his trial under the Official Secrets Act 1911 for giving secrets to Czechoslovak intelligence. Although found not guilty, it was claimed by intelligence historian Christopher Andrew in The Defence of the Realm that "he was almost certainly guilty as charged".

== Miner ==
Owen was born in Bedwellty, Monmouthshire and went to Blaina Boys' Central School, which he left at the age of 13 to go to work in the local coal mines. However he was determined to better himself and in 1920 left work to study at the London Labour College. When his course ended he returned to Blaina to become a Tutor Organiser for the National Council of Labour Colleges, arranging for other local miners to attend further education courses.

== Co-operative official ==
Already involved in Labour Party politics, in 1923 Owen was elected to Blaina District Council, on which he served for four years. In 1930 he moved to Leicester and became Secretary of the Leicester branch of the Independent Labour Party; he was elected to Leicester City Council in 1932. He then worked in the Co-operative movement, in the Education and Management section in Leicester, and from 1938 in the Education Office of Burslem Co-operative north of Stoke-on-Trent.

== Political advancement ==
In 1940, Owen moved to London to work in the London Co-operative, followed four years later by a transfer to Bristol. The nationalisation of the mines in 1948 led him to a job in the Community Office of the National Coal Board from 1948. He had further connections with the Co-operative movement. At this stage, Owen was the unsuccessful Labour candidate for Dover in the 1950 and 1951 general elections.

== Parliamentary career ==
Owen was chosen as Labour and Co-operative Party candidate for Morpeth at a by-election in 1954. This was a safe seat, and Owen was duly elected. He remained a backbencher throughout his time at Westminster, although he did introduce a Private Members' Bill to regulate driving tests in 1966. Owen was allied with the left and wanted the British government to distance itself from the United States over the Vietnam War. For many years, he served on the Estimates Committee, which gave him access to some secret information about government projects.

== Secrets trial ==
A senior Czechoslovak intelligence officer, Josef Frolik, defected to the United States in 1969. He immediately named several British Labour MPs as having been friendly with Czechoslovak intelligence, including Owen. On 15 January 1970 Owen was arrested at his home in Carshalton, and charged with communicating information useful to an enemy. Bail was refused and Owen was held in custody until his trial at the Central Criminal Court (Old Bailey) in April 1970. Owen resigned his seat on 2 April by means of the Stewardship of the Manor of Northstead.

At trial, it was established that Owen had received cash from Robert Husak, an intelligence officer at the Czechoslovak Embassy; he admitted receiving a regular envelope each month which sometimes contained £10, and sometimes £20 (Owen's bank account details showed that the real figure must have been much higher). In return, Owen discussed political developments, but he denied ever passing on secret information, and the prosecution were unable to find any secret documents in his home. On 6 May, Owen was found not guilty on all charges.

== Later life ==
Owen was partially rehabilitated as Chairman of Carshalton and Wallington Constituency Labour Party from 1974. However, Frolik's memoirs (written in 1975) portrayed him as a major agent. He gives Owen's codename as "Lee".

'Lee' was interested solely in the five hundred pounds a month retainer which we gave him .. In spite of the obvious danger, he was always demanding free holidays in Czechoslovakia so that he might save the expense of having to pay for the vacation himself. He even went as far as pocketing as many cigars as possible whenever he came to the Embassy for a party.

== Sources ==
- Leigh Rayment's Peerage Pages
- M. Stenton and S. Lees Who's Who of British MPs Vol. IV (Harvester Press, 1981)
- Stephen Dorril and Robin Ramsay Smear: Wilson and the Secret State (4th Estate, 1991)
- Josef Frolik The Frolik Defection (Corgi, 1976)

Parliament of the United Kingdom
Preceded by Robert Taylor	Member of Parliament for Morpeth; 1954–1970	Succeeded by George Grant
