= Eveline Hill =

British catering business manager and Conservative Party politician

Eveline Hill JP
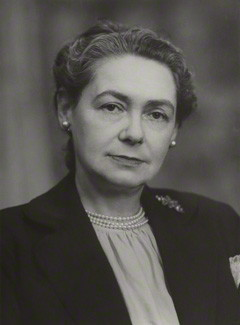

Member of Parliament for Manchester Wythenshawe
- In office 23 February 1950 – 25 September 1964
- Prime Minister: Clement Attlee
- Preceded by: New constituency
- Succeeded by: Alf Morris

Personal details
- Born: Eveline Ridyard; 16 April 1898 Manchester
- Died: 22 September 1973 (aged 75)
- Party: Conservative
- Spouse: John Stanley Hill (m. 1922; died 1947)
- Children: John, Betty and Faye

Eveline Hill, JP (née Ridyard; 16 April 1898 – 22 September 1973) was a British catering business manager and Conservative Party politician. She served for fourteen years as the Member of Parliament (MP) for Manchester Wythenshawe.

== Family ==
Hill was born to a rising middle-class family in Manchester, where her parents, Richard and Mary Ridyard, ran a catering business. They were not wealthy enough to send her to public school, and on leaving state secondary school in Manchester, she joined the family business. In 1922 she married John Stanley Hill, and as usual for married women in those times, gave up work to look after the home. They had a son, John, and two daughters, Betty and Faye. John married Joyce Lee and had two children John and Caroline. Caroline has three children Jennifer, Christopher and Daniel. Betty went on to have two children Alex Angus and Richard William Smith who married Anne Hinds in 1986 and had 3 children Benjamin, Hannah and Joshua.

== Community activities ==
On the death of her father, Hill and her brother took joint control of the family firm. She also became involved in the Conservative Party and in 1936 was elected to Manchester City Council from Didsbury ward. On the council she specialised in health issues, and was chair of the Health Committee and of the South Manchester Hospital Management Committee. In addition to her council work she was County Borough organiser for the Women's Voluntary Service (WVS) for Manchester from 1943, and a Justice of the Peace from 1945. She chaired the local Poppy Fund. She was widowed in 1947.

== Parliament ==
At the 1950 general election, Hill was elected as Conservative Member of Parliament for Manchester Wythenshawe, a newly created constituency at the southern end of Manchester which included her ward. Her maiden speech was on the subject of housebuilding, which she urged be maintained in order to prevent illnesses associated with poor housing.

== Women's issues ==
In November 1950 Hill won a spot in the ballot for Private Member's Bills, and introduced the Deserted Wives Bill which proposed to allow courts to award tenancy of a house and ownership of the chattels within it to a wife who had been deserted by her husband. However, she was unable to find the votes to force a vote on its merits and the Bill fell. In 1952 Hill, together with three other backbench women Conservative MPs, wrote to The Times to urge Conservative Associations to adopt more women candidates.

Hill broke the Conservative whip to oppose changes in the Manchester constituency boundaries in 1954, and found herself in a slightly less favourable position at the 1955 general election; she was re-elected by 2,822 votes. She became chairman of the Conservative backbench committee on Health and Social Security, and in 1958 supported government proposals to increase National Health Service charges, arguing that people who made contributions were putting something away for a rainy day in the traditional manner.

== Rebelliousness ==
In 1961 Hill supported the reintroduction of corporal punishment. She also rebelled the next year over a Bill setting up a training council for Health visitors, to increase the council's power to make grants. Reacting to the 1963 budget, she hoped that husbands would pass on to their wives some of their allowances which had been increased. She also joined the rebellion over the abolition of resale price maintenance in 1964.

== Defeat ==
Having held a marginal seat for two elections, Hill's position was made more difficult by the growth of council housing in the constituency in the early 1960s. At the 1964 general election, she was defeated by a wide margin of 4,777 votes. Hill had retained her seat on Manchester City Council throughout her time in Parliament, but retired in 1966; the Council appointed her as an honorary Alderman in honour of her years of service.

Parliament of the United Kingdom
| New constituency | Member of Parliament for Manchester Wythenshawe; 1950–1964 | Succeeded by Alf Morris |
