= Percy Holman =

British politician

Percy Holman (5 April 1891 – 9 June 1978) was a British Labour and Co-operative politician.

Holman was educated at Mill Hill School and the London School of Economics. As e conscientious objector, he served in World War I with the Friends' Ambulance Unit and Red Cross in France, 1915–18. He took up a career as a paper merchant.

Holman was a councillor on Middlesex County Council 1928-31 and Teddington Urban District Council 1928–34. He stood as a candidate in Twickenham four times, at the 1931 general election, by-elections in 1932 and 1934 and the 1935 general election, without success. He was elected Member of Parliament for South West Bethnal Green in 1945 and for the redrawn Bethnal Green in 1950, serving until 1966.

== Family ==
On 10 May 1918, he married Dorothy Mary Anderson (an Australian) who was a Labour member of the London County Council for twenty years. They had two daughters and a son.

Parliament of the United Kingdom
Preceded by Sir Percy Harris	Member of Parliament for Bethnal Green South West; 1945–1950	Constituency abolished
New constituency	Member of Parliament for Bethnal Green; 1950–1966	Succeeded by William Hilton
