= Roy Douglas (academic) =

British author (1924–2020)

Roy Ian Douglas (December 1924 – 11 December 2020) was a British author, academic and political activist.

Douglas was educated at Rutlish School in Morden, and joined the Liberal Party when he was sixteen. He studied at King's College London, and while there served as chair of its Liberal Association. He later served as president, and then as chair, of the National League of Young Liberals, and completed a doctorate at the University of Edinburgh. In 1953 he was a Liberal candidate for East ward in the Bethnal Green Metropolitan Borough Council elections. He became a barrister in 1956 with Gray's Inn.

He stood for the Liberal Party at numerous Parliamentary elections: in Merton and Morden in 1950, Bethnal Green in 1951 and 1955, and Gainsborough in 1959 and 1964. By this time, he was serving on the council of the Liberal Party. In the run-up to the 1975 United Kingdom European Communities membership referendum, Douglas chaired the Liberal "No to the Common Market" Campaign.

Douglas later became a lecturer in biology at the University of Surrey. He wrote numerous books, including Surrey: The Rise of a Modern University and The History of the Liberal Party 1895-1970.

He died in December 2020, shortly before his 96th birthday.
