= Jack Bailey (co-operator) =

Welsh co-operative activist and politician

Sir Jack Bailey
- Born: John Bailey; 1 January 1898; Miskin, Mountain Ash, Glamorgan, Wales
- Died: 18 January 1969 (aged 71); Enfield, London, England
- Education: Ruskin College, Oxford
- Occupations: Politician; Co-operator
- Spouse: Anne Glaser (m. 1926)
- Children: 3

Sir John Bailey (1 January 1898 – 18 January 1969) was a Welsh co-operative activist and politician.

Born in Miskin, near Mountain Ash, Bailey attended the Gwyn Ivor School until he was twelve, then worked for a cobbler before becoming a coal miner. However, in 1915 he suffered an accident which prevented him from working underground, and in 1917 he enlisted in the South Wales Borderers.

In 1919, Bailey returned to mining, becoming more involved with the South Wales Miners' Federation, who funded him to complete a correspondence course with Ruskin College and then to attend the Central Labour College. He also joined the Independent Labour Party, and in 1922, while studying in London, he unsuccessfully stood for the party in Kensington. The following year, he returned to Mountain Ash, and was elected to the local council.

Bailey took a job in 1925 as political secretary for the Co-operative Party in Bradford, and during this period was twice elected to Bradford City Council. He then moved back to London as the party's national organiser, and in 1942 was appointed as its general secretary. In the role, he led calls for the Labour Party government to promote co-operative ownership. In 1955, his textbook, The British Co-operative Movement, was published.

Bailey retired as general secretary in 1962, but remained involved with the movement, serving on a committee set up to consider the merger of local co-operatives, and chairing the Co-operative Congress in 1964. He received a knighthood in the 1965 New Year Honours.

Party political offices
| Preceded by Samuel Perry | General Secretary of the Co-operative Party; 1942 – 1962 | Succeeded by Harold Campbell |
