= Harold Campbell (co-operator) =

Harold Campbell (28 February 1913 – 14 January 2002) was a British co-operative activist.

Born in Enfield, Middlesex, Campbell joined the British Federation of Young Co-operators. He was a conscientious objector during the Second World War, working as an agricultural labourer. After the war he became involved with the Co-operative Party, soon becoming assistant general secretary, then in 1962 was appointed general secretary.

In 1967 Campbell stood down as general secretary to take up a post managing a housing trust. However, he remained chair of Co-operative Planning and the Co-Ownership Development Society.

Campbell retired in 1985 and moved to Portugal with friends; the group later returned to the UK.

Party political offices
Preceded by Jack Bailey	General Secretary of the Co-operative Party; 1962 – 1967	Succeeded by Ted Graham
