= 1954 Morpeth by-election =

UK Parliamentary by-election

The 1954 Morpeth by-election was held on 4 November 1954. The by-election was triggered by the death on 19 July of the incumbent Labour MP, Robert Taylor. The by-election was won by the Labour candidate Will Owen.

Morpeth by-election, 1954
Party	Candidate	Votes	%	±%
Labour Co-op	Will Owen	23,491	71.27	−0.61
Conservative	William Elliott	9,469	28.73	+0.61
Majority		14,022	42.54	−1.22
Turnout		32,960		
Labour Co-op hold		Swing		
