= William Hilton (British politician) =

British politician (1926–1999)

William "Bill" Samuel Hilton (21 March 1926 – 12 June 1999) was a British Labour and Co-operative politician and trade unionist who later went on to become director general of the Federation of Master Builders.

== Early life ==
Hilton was born in Woolley Colliery, near Wakefield, Yorkshire, in 1926. His father was a master painter who moved to Saltcoats in Ayrshire, Scotland to find work. Hilton was educated at Ardrossan Academy and retained a Scottish accent for the rest of his life.

He initially worked as a railway fireman, becoming active with the National Union of Railwaymen. His involvement in Labour politics saw him become agent to David Kirkwood, an Independent Labour Party member of parliament and militant "Red Clydesider".

When Kirkwood retired from parliament in 1951, Hilton became national organiser of the Association of Building Technicians, subsequently taking up the post of research officer with the National Federation of Building Trades Operatives in 1953. In 1954 he was the author of Building by Direct Labour: A National Survey.

== Parliament ==
He first contested a parliamentary election in 1955, standing unsuccessfully at East Hertfordshire, a safe Conservative seat. At the next election in 1959 he contested the more marginal seat of Ealing North, but again failed to be elected.

He finally entered the Commons at the 1966 general election, succeeding Percy Holman as Member of Parliament for the safe Labour seat of Bethnal Green. In the same year, he published his second book Foes to tyranny: a history of the Amalgamated Union of Building Trade Workers.

He became parliamentary private secretary to Bob Mellish, Minister of State for Public Buildings and Works. In 1968, his third book, Industrial Relations in Construction, brought him to the attention of the Federation of Master Builders, the trade association of small and medium-sized building contractors. He resigned from the Government in 1969 over the introduction of Selective Employment Tax. In 1969, he became director of the federation. He held his seat at the 1970 general election, but found himself on the opposition benches when the Conservatives won a parliamentary majority. Following a serious illness in 1971 Hilton became disillusioned with politics, and decided to dedicate himself to his work with the builders federation. When it became clear that his constituency was to be abolished due to boundary changes, he announced he would not be seeking re-election elsewhere. Accordingly, he left parliament at the next election in February 1974.

== After parliament ==
As national director of the Federation of Master Builders, Hilton was responsible for introducing an industry-wide warranty scheme against defective workmanship, helped create the Building and Allied Trades Joint Industrial Council and, following accession to the European Economic Community, worked to form the European Builders Confederation. He became director general of the federation in 1987, holding the position until his retirement in 1991. He wrote an autobiographical account of his experiences in the railway and building industries, The Plug Dropper, in 1986 and an account of his childhood, The Wee Spartans, in 1998.

Hilton was twice married. In 1948 he married Nan Aitken Orr with whom he had three sons. The couple were divorced in 1985, and he married Betty Penfold in 1986. Hilton died in Chipstead, Surrey in June 1999. His final book, Speakers are Born?, a guide to public speaking, was published posthumously.

Parliament of the United Kingdom
Preceded by Percy Holman	Member of Parliament for Bethnal Green; 1966–Feb 1974	Constituency abolished
