= Manchester Wythenshawe =

Parliamentary constituency in the United Kingdom, 1950–1997

Coordinates: 53.397°N 2.269°W

- Former borough constituency for the House of Commons
- Manchester Wythenshawe in Greater Manchester, showing boundaries used from 1983–1997
- County: Greater Manchester

1950–1997
- Seats: One
- Created from: Manchester Withington
- Replaced by: Wythenshawe and Sale East,

Manchester Wythenshawe was a parliamentary constituency centred on the Wythenshawe suburb of Manchester. It returned one Member of Parliament (MP) to the House of Commons of the Parliament of the United Kingdom.

The constituency was created for the 1950 general election, and abolished for the 1997 general election. It was then replaced by the new Wythenshawe and Sale East constituency which joined it with the eastern half of Sale from the Trafford Metropolitan Borough.

== Boundaries ==
Manchester Wythenshawe in Lancashire, boundaries used 1974–1983

1950–1955: The County Borough of Manchester wards of Didsbury and Wythenshawe.

1955–1974: The County Borough of Manchester wards of Baguley, Benchill, Didsbury, Northenden, and Woodhouse Park.

1974–1983: The County Borough of Manchester wards of Baguley, Benchill, Northenden, and Woodhouse Park.

1983–1997: The City of Manchester wards of Baguley, Benchill, Brooklands, Northenden, Sharston, and Woodhouse Park.

== Members of Parliament ==
Election	Member	Party
1950	Eveline Hill	Conservative
1964	Alf Morris	Labour
1997	constituency abolished: see Wythenshawe and Sale East	

== Elections ==
=== Elections in the 1950s ===
General election 1950: Manchester Wythenshawe
Party	Candidate	Votes	%	±%
Conservative	Eveline Hill	22,775	49.3	
Labour	Charles W Bridges	17,191	37.2	
Liberal	Eric Noble	5,607	12.2	
Communist	Frances Dean	588	1.3	
Majority		5,584	12.1	
Turnout		46,161	84.2	
Conservative hold		Swing		

General election 1951: Manchester Wythenshawe
Party	Candidate	Votes	%	±%
Conservative	Eveline Hill	28,611	56.5	+7.2
Labour	Lewis L Hanbidge	22,055	43.5	+6.3
Majority		6,556	13.0	+0.9
Turnout		50,666	81.1	−3.1
Conservative hold		Swing		

General election 1955: Manchester Wythenshawe
Party	Candidate	Votes	%	±%
Conservative	Eveline Hill	26,200	52.8	−3.7
Labour	Norman Atkinson	23,378	47.2	+3.7
Majority		2,882	5.6	−7.4
Turnout		49,578	76.3	−4.8
Conservative hold		Swing		

General election 1959: Manchester Wythenshawe
Party	Candidate	Votes	%	±%
Conservative	Eveline Hill	28,934	51.2	−1.6
Labour Co-op	Alf Morris	27,625	48.9	+1.7
Majority		1,309	2.3	−3.3
Turnout		56,559	80.9	+4.6
Conservative hold		Swing		

=== Elections in the 1960s ===
General election 1964: Manchester Wythenshawe
Party	Candidate	Votes	%	±%
Labour Co-op	Alf Morris	26,870	47.7	−1.2
Conservative	Eveline Hill	22,093	39.2	−12.0
Liberal	Thomas N Armstrong	7,336	13.0	New
Majority		4,777	8.5	N/A
Turnout		56,299	79.6	−1.3
Labour Co-op gain from Conservative		Swing		

General election 1966: Manchester Wythenshawe
Party	Candidate	Votes	%	±%
Labour Co-op	Alf Morris	27,485	53.1	+5.4
Conservative	Frank Lofthouse	18,548	35.8	−3.4
Liberal	Thomas N Armstrong	5,717	11.1	−1.9
Majority		8,937	17.3	+8.8
Turnout		51,750	74.8	−4.8
Labour Co-op hold		Swing		

=== Elections in the 1970s ===
General election 1970: Manchester Wythenshawe
Party	Candidate	Votes	%	±%
Labour Co-op	Alf Morris	30,260	55.3	+2.2
Conservative	Henry Donald Moore	24,505	44.8	+9.0
Majority		5,755	10.5	−6.8
Turnout		54,765	70.2	−4.6
Labour Co-op hold		Swing		

General election February 1974: Manchester Wythenshawe
Party	Candidate	Votes	%	±%
Labour Co-op	Alf Morris	26,900	55.7	+2.4
Conservative	Joyce Hill	14,462	30.0	−14.8
Liberal	Anthony Blonde	6,905	14.3	New
Majority		12,438	25.7	+15.2
Turnout		48,267	75.0	+4.8
Labour Co-op hold		Swing		

General election October 1974: Manchester Wythenshawe
Party	Candidate	Votes	%	±%
Labour Co-op	Alf Morris	26,448	59.1	+3.4
Conservative	Joyce Hill	12,269	27.4	−2.6
Liberal	RN Scott	6,071	13.6	−0.7
Majority		14,179	31.7	+6.0
Turnout		44,788	68.8	−6.2
Labour Co-op hold		Swing		

General election 1979: Manchester Wythenshawe
Party	Candidate	Votes	%	±%
Labour Co-op	Alf Morris	26,860	59.1	0.0
Conservative	David Sumberg	14,747	32.4	+5.0
Liberal	Lee Griffiths	3,853	8.5	−5.1
Majority		12,113	26.7	−5.0
Turnout		45,460	75.0	+6.2
Labour Co-op hold		Swing		

=== Elections in the 1980s ===
General election 1983: Manchester Wythenshawe
Party	Candidate	Votes	%	±%
Labour Co-op	Alf Morris	23,172	54.6	
Conservative	Joan Jacobs	12,488	29.4	
Liberal	David J. Sandiford	6,766	16.0	
Majority		10,684	25.2	
Turnout		42,426	69.6	
Labour Co-op hold		Swing		

General election 1987: Manchester Wythenshawe
Party	Candidate	Votes	%	±%
Labour Co-op	Alf Morris	23,881	56.8	+2.2
Conservative	David Sparrow	12,026	28.6	−0.8
SDP	Joan Butterworth	5,921	14.1	−1.9
Red Front	Susan Connelly	216	0.5	New
Majority		11,855	28.2	+3.0
Turnout		42,044	72.1	+2.5
Labour Co-op hold		Swing		

=== Elections in the 1990s ===
General election 1992: Manchester Wythenshawe
Party	Candidate	Votes	%	±%
Labour Co-op	Alf Morris	22,591	60.5	+3.7
Conservative	Kevin A. McKenna	10,595	28.4	−0.2
Liberal Democrats	Stephen Fenn	3,633	9.7	−4.4
Green	Guy N. Otten	362	1.0	New
Natural Law	Elspeth Martin	133	0.4	New
Majority		11,996	32.1	+3.9
Turnout		37,314	69.7	−2.4
Labour Co-op hold		Swing	+2.0	
