= T. W. Mercer =

British co-operator and journalist (1884–1947)

- Born: Thomas William Mercer; 20 July 1884; Nutfield, Surrey, England
- Died: 3 March 1947 (aged 62)
- Movement: Co-operative

Thomas William Mercer (20 July 1884 – 3 March 1947) was an English labour and co-operative movement official and journalist.

Born in Nutfield, Surrey, Mercer worked in a grocery from the age of twelve, then later undertook an apprenticeship as a grocer in Croydon. On completing the apprenticeship, he found work with the Reigate Industrial Society, a local co-operative, rising to become a manager before moving to run the Epsom Co-operative Society, then on to Plymouth, where he ran the local co-operative's education department. While there, he acted as election agent to William Thomas Gay, who stood unsuccessfully in Plymouth Sutton at the 1918 UK general election, and a by-election in 1919.

Later in 1919, Mercer began working at the newly established Co-operative College in Manchester. He stood as a Labour Co-operative candidate in Manchester Moss Side at the 1922 UK general election, and Mossley at the 1924 UK general election, but was not elected. Instead, he became editor of the Co-operative Review, and spent the rest of his working life as a journalist on the Co-operative News and Reynolds News. He was also being active in both the National Amalgamated Union of Shop Assistants, Warehousemen and Clerks and the Amalgamated Union of Co-operative Employees.

In his spare time, Mercer wrote Towards a Co-operative Commonwealth, and served on the committee of the Workers Educational Association.
