= Bethnal Green (UK Parliament constituency) =

Parliamentary constituency in the United Kingdom, 1950–1974

- Former borough constituency for the House of Commons

1950–February 1974
- Seats: one
- Created from: Bethnal Green North East, Bethnal Green South West and Hackney South
- Replaced by: Bethnal Green and Bow

Bethnal Green was a parliamentary constituency in the Bethnal Green area of the East End of London, which returned one Member of Parliament (MP) to the House of Commons of the Parliament of the United Kingdom from 1950 until it was abolished for the February 1974 general election.

It was then partly replaced by the new Bethnal Green and Bow constituency.

== Boundaries ==
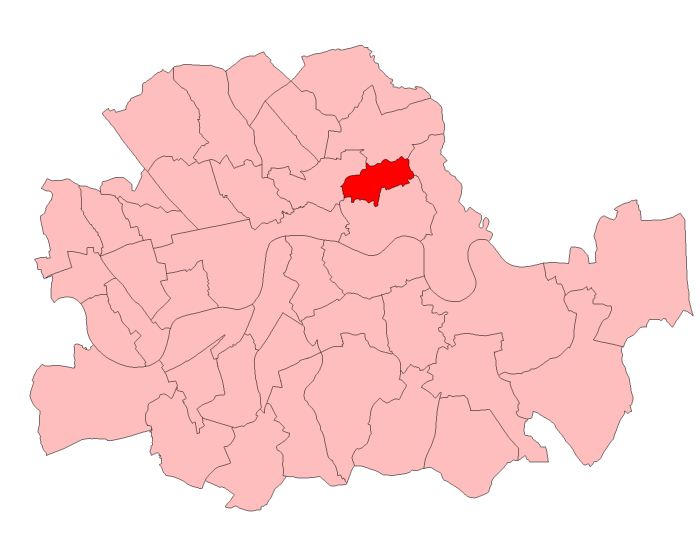
Bethnal Green in the County of London 1950-55

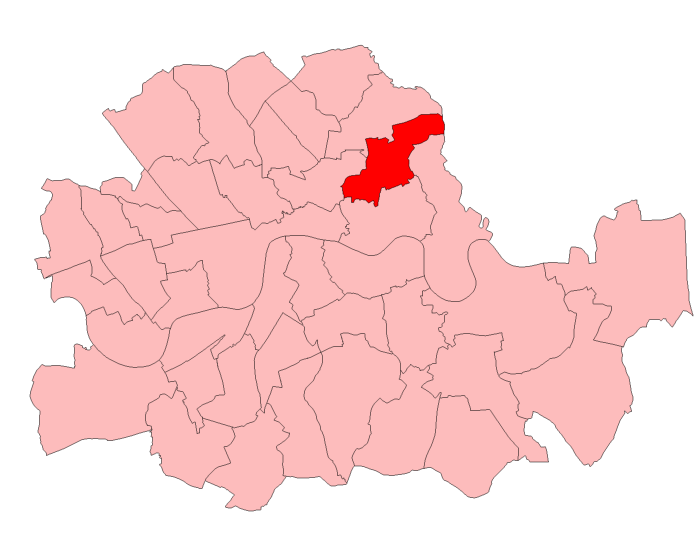
Bethnal Green in the County of London 1955-74

This area had been part of the County of London since 1889, having previously been part of the historic county of Middlesex.

The constituency, when created in 1950, comprised the whole of the Metropolitan Borough of Bethnal Green in the County of London. In 1955 part of the Metropolitan Borough of Hackney was added to the seat. The wards involved were Triangle, Victoria and Wick.

In 1965 Bethnal Green became part of the London Borough of Tower Hamlets in Greater London. Hackney was expanded to form the London Borough of Hackney.

== Members of Parliament ==
Election	Member	Party
1950	Percy Holman	Labour Co-op
1966	William Hilton	Labour
Feb 1974	constituency abolished: see Bethnal Green and Bow	

== Elections ==
=== Elections in the 1950s ===
General election 1950: Bethnal Green
Party	Candidate	Votes	%	±%
Labour Co-op	Percy Holman	20,519	63.3	
Liberal	Percy Harris	9,715	30.0	
Conservative	Dorothy E. Welfare	1,582	4.9	
Communist	Jeffrey J. Mildwater	610	1.9	
Majority		10,804	33.3	
Turnout		32,426	76.9	
Registered electors		42,172		
Labour Co-op win (new seat)				

General election 1951: Bethnal Green
Party	Candidate	Votes	%	±%
Labour Co-op	Percy Holman	22,162	69.75	+6.35
Liberal	Roy Douglas	6,567	20.67	−9.33
Conservative	Lawrence Goodman	3,046	9.59	+4.69
Majority		15,595	49.08	+15.78
Turnout		31,775	75.96	−0.94
Registered electors		41,830		
Labour Co-op hold		Swing	+7.84	

General election 1955: Bethnal Green
Party	Candidate	Votes	%	±%
Labour Co-op	Percy Holman	27,205	69.31	−0.44
Conservative	John W Millbourne	6,504	16.57	+6.98
Liberal	Roy Douglas	5,541	14.12	−6.55
Majority		20,701	52.74	+3.66
Turnout		39,250	63.91	−12.05
Registered electors		61,410		
Labour Co-op hold		Swing	-3.71	

General election 1959: Bethnal Green
Party	Candidate	Votes	%	±%
Labour Co-op	Percy Holman	24,228	63.68	−5.63
Conservative	P Ralph Roney	7,412	19.48	+2.91
Liberal	Joseph Hart	5,508	14.48	+0.36
Socialist (GB)	Jack L Read	899	2.36	New
Majority		16,816	44.20	−8.54
Turnout		38,047	66.03	+2.12
Registered electors		57,617		
Labour Co-op hold		Swing	-4.27	

=== Elections in the 1960s ===
General election 1964: Bethnal Green
Party	Candidate	Votes	%	±%
Labour Co-op	Percy Holman	19,914	64.65	+0.97
Conservative	Stephen Stout-Kerr	5,593	18.16	−1.32
Liberal	Tudor Gates	5,296	17.19	+2.71
Majority		14,321	46.49	+2.29
Turnout		30,803	59.34	−6.69
Registered electors		51,906		
Labour Co-op hold		Swing	+1.15	

General election 1966: Bethnal Green
Party	Candidate	Votes	%	±%
Labour	William Hilton	20,178	69.71	+5.06
Conservative	Oswald S Henriques	4,925	17.02	−1.14
Liberal	Tudor Gates	3,841	13.27	−3.92
Majority		15,253	52.69	+6.20
Turnout		28,944	57.68	−1.66
Registered electors		50,180		
Labour hold		Swing	+3.1	

=== Elections in the 1970s ===
General election 1970: Bethnal Green
Party	Candidate	Votes	%	±%
Labour	William Hilton	15,483	64.24	−5.47
Conservative	Oswald S Henriques	5,587	23.18	+6.16
Liberal	Oliver Smedley	3,030	12.57	−0.70
Majority		9,905	41.06	−11.64
Turnout		24,100	50.39	−7.39
Registered electors		50,180		
Labour hold		Swing	-5.82	

== Bibliography ==
- Boundaries of Parliamentary Constituencies 1885-1972, compiled and edited by F.W.S. Craig (Parliamentary Reference Publications 1972)
- Leigh Rayment's Historical List of MPs – Constituencies beginning with "B" (part 3)
