= Alf Morris =

British Labour Co-operative politician and disability rights campaigner

The Right Honourable The Lord Morris of Manchester AO QSO PC
- Alf Morris (1965)

Parliamentary Under-Secretary of State for Disablement
- In office 11 March 1974 – 4 May 1979
- Prime Minister: Harold Wilson; James Callaghan
- Preceded by: Office established
- Succeeded by: Reg Prentice (as Minister of State)

Member of the House of Lords
- Lord Temporal
- Life peerage 6 October 1997 – 12 August 2012

Member of Parliament for Manchester Wythenshawe
- In office 15 October 1964 – 8 April 1997
- Preceded by: Eveline Hill
- Succeeded by: Constituency abolished

Personal details
- Born: Alfred Morris; 23 March 1928 Manchester, England
- Died: 12 August 2012 (aged 84)
- Party: Labour and Co-operative
- Spouse: Irene Jones (m. 1950)
- Children: 4
- Relatives: Charles Morris (brother); Estelle Morris (niece)

Alfred Morris, Baron Morris of Manchester, AO, QSO, PC (23 March 1928 – 12 August 2012) was a British Labour Co-operative politician and disability rights campaigner.

== Political career ==
Morris served as Member of Parliament for Manchester Wythenshawe from 1964 until 1997, having previously unsuccessfully fought the, then, safe Conservative seat of Liverpool Garston in 1951 and the Wythenshawe seat in 1959. He served as Parliamentary Private Secretary to Fred Peart, the Agriculture Minister. Morris campaigned against British entry to the Common Market and in May 1967 Prime Minister Harold Wilson sacked him, and six others, for abstaining in a Commons vote on the issue. Fred Peart did not appoint a replacement and Morris continued to work for him, albeit unofficially. In 1968, Peart became Leader of the Commons and reappointed Morris as his Parliamentary Private Secretary.

In 1970 Morris successfully introduced the Chronically Sick and Disabled Persons Act, which was the first in the world to recognise and give rights to people with disabilities. In 1974 he became the first Minister for the Disabled anywhere in the world. In 1991 he introduced a Civil Rights (Disabled Persons) Bill and he led campaigns on Gulf War Syndrome.

He was created a life peer as Lord Morris of Manchester, of Manchester in the County of Greater Manchester, in 1997. He was a life member of the GMB Union, the general trade union of the United Kingdom. He served as President of the 1995 Co-operative Congress. He was president of the Haemophilia Society from 1999 to 2012.

== Background ==
Morris (one of the eight children of George Henry Morris and his wife Jessie Murphy) was raised in poor circumstances in Ancoats, Manchester.

In 1935, the family left Ancoats and moved to a new housing estate in Newton Heath. He was educated at Brookdale Park School Newton Heath along with Harold Evans, who, as editor of The Sunday Times, wrote a leader saying that: "As time ticked away to the 1970 general election, Alf Morris's Bill was the only piece of legislation worth saving." He received evening school tuition. He worked from the age of 14 as a clerk in the local Wilson's Brewery.

Morris, whose father lost an eye and a leg and was gassed while serving in the First World War, and then suffered a long decline in health and eventual death arising from his injuries, became a campaigner on behalf of those with disabilities. After his father's death, Morris's mother was not entitled to a war widow's pension. Forty years later, Morris himself put the matter right by changing the law affecting armed forces pensions when he became the UK and the World's first Minister for the Disabled.

Morris did his national service in the army, mainly in the Middle East, from 1946 to 1948. He then studied at Ruskin College, Oxford (1949–1950), St Catherine's College, Oxford (BA modern history 1953) and the Department of Education, Manchester University.

Morris worked as a Manchester schoolteacher and university extension lecturer in social history (1954–1956) and as an Industrial relations officer to the Electrical Supply Industry (1956–1964).

== Family ==
He married Irene Jones in 1950. They had two sons and two daughters.

His brother Charles Morris and his niece Estelle Morris have also served as Labour MPs; Estelle also served as a peer alongside him from 2005.

Lord Morris died in hospital on Sunday 12 August 2012 after a short illness, aged 84.

== Awards and honours ==
- 1971 Field Marshel Lord Harding Award for distinguished service to the disabled
- 1972 Louis Braille Memorial Award for outstanding service to the blind
- 1979 Member of the Privy Council of the United Kingdom
- 1989 Companion of the Queen's Service Order for public services, 1989 New Year Honours, New Zealand
- 1991 Honorary Officer of the Order of Australia
- 1997 University of Salford honorary doctorate
- 1997 Life Peer
- 1998 University of Manchester honorary doctorate
- 2000 Named, with Chrissie Maher and Tim Berners-Lee, "Information Pioneers of the Century" by the UK's National Information Forum.
- 2005 MENCAP Lifetime achievement award
- 2009 Honorary Fellowship of the Royal College of Physicians and Surgeons of Glasgow and of the Royal College of Physicians

Coat of arms of Alf Morris
| Crest A koala sejant erect guardant Gules gorged with a plain collar attached thereto a chain reflexed over the back Or. Escutcheon Gules on a pile reversed throughout Argent a pile reversed throughout Gules thereon three bees volant in pale Or. Supporters On either side a kiwi Argent legged and gorged with a plain collar Or and holding in the beak also Or a rose Gules barbed seeded slipped and leaved Or. Motto Humanity Badge A Cockatoo wings elevated and addorsed Azure beaked legged crested and within a circle of ten Mullets Or |

== Publications ==
- The Growth of Parliamentary Scrutiny by Committee (Oxford, Pergamon P., 1970).
- Needs before Means: an exposition of the underlying purposes of the Chronically Sick and Disabled Persons Act, 1970 (Manchester, Co-operative Union, 1971).
- No Feet to Drag: report on the disabled (London, Sidgwick and Jackson, 1972).
- Alf Morris: People's Parliamentarian – Scenes from the Life of Lord Morris of Manchester (London, National Information Forum, 2007).

== Archives ==
- Catalogue of the papers of Alfred Morris at London School of Economics Archives

== See also ==
Chronically Sick and Disabled Persons Act 1970 – Act of the Parliament of the United Kingdom

Parliament of the United Kingdom
| Preceded by Eveline Hill | Member of Parliament for Manchester Wythenshawe; 1964–1997 | Constituency abolished |
Political offices
| New title First Minister for the Disabled in the world | Minister of State for Social Security (Minister for the Disabled) | Succeeded by Reg Prentice |
