= Co-operative Party =

British political party, in an electoral pact with the Labour Party

- General Secretary: Jim Robbins
- Chair of the NEC: Jim McMahon
- Founded: 17 October 1917 (in Swansea)
- Headquarters: 83 Crampton Street; London SE17 3BQ
- Youth wing: Co-operative Party Youth
- Membership (2025): 13,020
- Ideology: Co-operatism; Social democracy; Mutualism
- Political position: Centre-left to left-wing
- Affiliate party: Labour Party (Labour and Co-operative Party)
- Colours: Purple
- House of Commons: 43 / 650
- House of Lords: 15 / 796
- Scottish Parliament: 7 / 129
- Senedd: 5 / 96
- Local Government: 1,400 / 19,698
- London Assembly: 10 / 25
- PCCs and PFCCs: 14 / 37
- Directly elected mayors: 13 / 27

Website
- party.coop

The Co-operative Party (Welsh: Y Blaid Gydweithredol) is a centre-left to left-wing political party in the United Kingdom, supporting co-operative values and principles. The party currently has an electoral pact with the Labour Party. Established in 1917, the Co-operative Party was founded by co-operative societies to campaign politically for the fairer treatment of co-operative enterprise and to elect co-operators to Parliament. The party's roots lie in the Parliamentary Committee of the Co-operative Union established in 1881. The current Prime Minister of the United Kingdom Andy Burnham is a Labour and Co-operative MP.

Since 1927, the Co-operative Party has had an electoral pact with the Labour Party, with the parties agreeing not to stand candidates against each other. Candidates selected by members of both parties contest elections using the description "Labour and Co-operative Party". The Co-operative Party is a legally separate entity from the Labour Party, and is registered as a political party with the Electoral Commission. Co-operative Party members are not permitted to be members of any other political party in the UK apart from the Labour Party or Northern Ireland's Social Democratic and Labour Party (SDLP).

As of June 2026, the Co-operative Party was the fourth-largest party in the House of Commons, with 44 members of parliament (MP). As all of its MPs sit with the Parliamentary Labour Party, this distinction is seldom made. The Co-operative Party also has representatives in the House of Lords, the Scottish Parliament, the Senedd, the London Assembly and some local government authorities. In keeping with its co-operative values and principles, the Co-operative Party does not have a leader. Instead Jim Robbins is its General Secretary, Preet Kaur Gill chairs the Co-operative Party Parliamentary Group, and Jim McMahon chairs the National Executive Committee.

== History ==
The Co‑operative Party was formed in 1917, after being approved in May of that year by the Congress of the British co-operative movement, held in Swansea. Since an electoral pact was established in 1927, the party has stood joint candidates with the Labour Party. In 1938, the Co‑operative Party adopted a written constitution that formalised its link with the Labour Party. Co‑operative Party candidates first stood in elections under the 'Labour Co‑operative' banner in 1946.

Sam Perry was the first national secretary of the party, serving from 1917 until 1942. In that capacity, he spoke at many meetings across the country. He was the Labour and Co‑operative MP for Kettering in 1923–1924 and 1929–1931, and was the father of the British tennis and table tennis champion Fred Perry.

In its formative years, the Co‑operative Party was almost exclusively concerned with the trading and commercial problems of the co‑operative movement. Since the 1930s, it has widened its emphasis, using influence gained through strong links with the political and commercial left to spread what it sees as the co‑operative ethos and moral principles. The party now seeks recognition for co‑operative enterprises and the 'social economy', and support for co‑operatives and co‑operation across Europe and the developing world. The party stands for a sustainable economy and society, and a culture of citizenship and socially responsible business, as represented by the practice of retail and industrial co‑operatives.

=== Joint Parliamentary Committee ===
The Joint Parliamentary Committee was set up in 1881 by The Co-operative Union. It was primarily a watchdog on parliamentary activities. Issues and legislation could be raised in the House of Commons only by lobbying sympathetic – usually Labour – MPs. As it was somewhat unsatisfactory to have to lobby MPs on each individual issue, motions were passed at the Co-operative Union Annual Congress urging direct parliamentary representation. However, for much of this early period societies would not commit funds.

=== First World War and early years ===
At the start of the First World War, the many retail societies in the co‑operative movement grew in both membership and trade; this was due, in part, to their very public anti‑profiteering stance. When conscription was introduced and food and fuel supplies were restricted, these societies began to suffer. The movement was under‑represented on the various governmental distribution committees and tribunals. Co‑operatives received minimal supplies, and even management were often drafted, whereas business opponents were able to have even clerks declared vital for the war effort. Societies were also required to pay excess profits tax, although their co‑operative nature meant that they made no profits. A motion was tabled at the 1917 Congress, held in Swansea, by the Joint Parliamentary Committee and 104 retail societies, calling for direct representation at national and local government levels. The motion was passed by 1,979 votes to 201.

At first, Co-operative Party candidates still stood separately from Labour in local elections. The Co-op Party's Congress Reports listed the local authority candidates and their successes, listing them as (a) Co-operative, (b) Co-operative-Labour, or (c) Labour. Before 1946, there was no requirement that Co-operative Party candidates had also to be members of the Labour Party. The Co-operative Party presented itself as the representative of the members of its affiliated Co-operative Societies. Hence the Party claimed more than 11 million members in each of the six years 1962–67. At times, the Party presented itself as non-political. In his 1932 election address, High Wycombe's first-elected Co-operative Party councillor Tom Collings wrote, "The Chesham and Wycombe Co-operative Society, as one of the largest ratepayers in the town, claims the right of DIRECT REPRESENTATION ON THE COUNCIL. ... Our Co-operative Party is not affiliated to any Political Party, but like the [Co-operative] Society itself, is composed of members having divers political views."

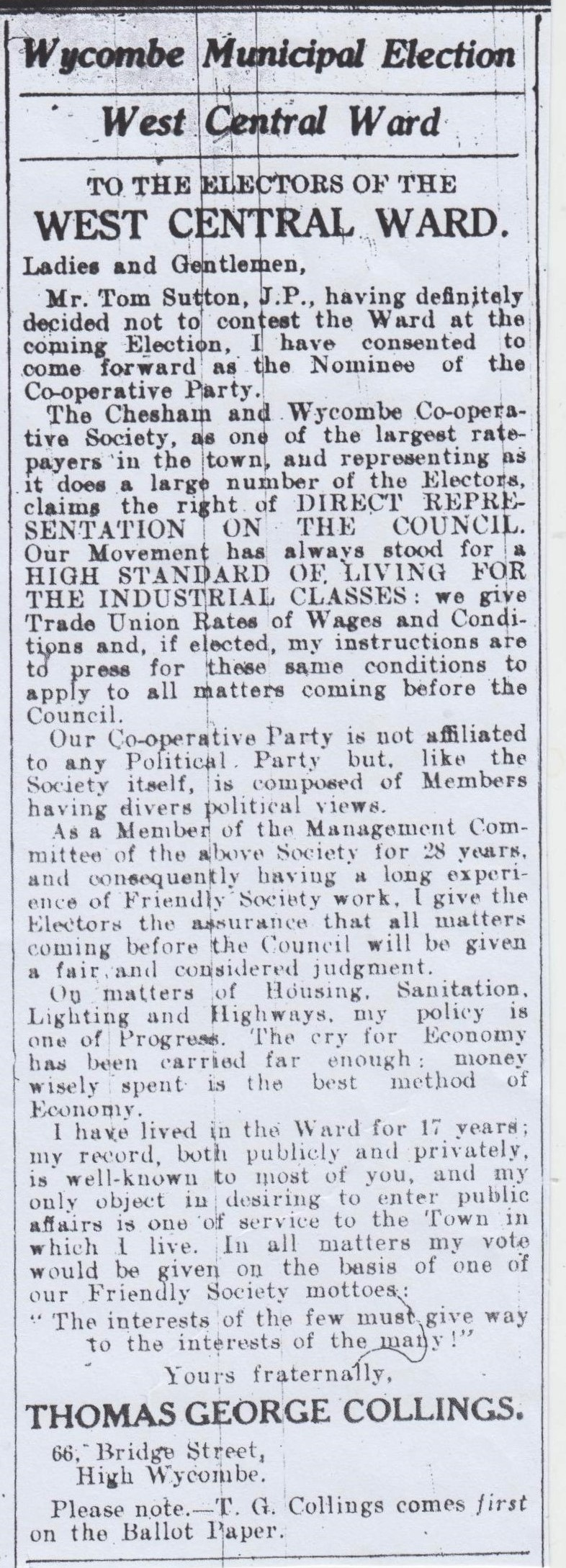
October 1932 election address of Tom Collings – High Wycombe Borough Council

=== Central Co-operative Parliamentary Representation Committee ===
An Emergency Political Conference was held on 18 October 1917. As a result, the Central Co-operative Parliamentary Representation Committee was formed in 1917, with the objective of putting co-operators into the House of Commons. This was soon renamed the Co-operative Party. The first national secretary was Samuel Perry, later a Member of Parliament and the father of Fred Perry. At first, the party put forward its own candidates. The first was H. J. May, later Secretary of the International Co-operative Alliance, who was unsuccessful at the January 1918 Prestwich by-election. Ten then stood in the 1918 general election. One candidate met with success, Alfred Waterson, who became a Member of Parliament for the Kettering seat. Waterson took the Labour whip in Parliament. In 1919, 151 Co-operative Party councillors were elected at local level. Waterson retired from Parliament in 1922, but four new Co-operative MPs were elected that same year, including A. V. Alexander, all of whom took the Labour whip. Six were elected in 1923 and five in 1924.

In the early years, Co-operative Party and Labour Party candidates stood against one another for election on at least one occasion, at Paisley in 1923, where a candidate nominated by the local Labour Party won enough votes to deny victory to J. M. Biggar of the Co-operative Party. Since the Cheltenham Agreement was made in 1927 the party has had an electoral agreement with the Labour Party, which allows for a limited number of Labour Co-operative candidates. This means that the parties involved do not oppose each other. The agreement has been amended several times, most recently in 2003, which was made in the name of the Co-operative Party rather than the Co-operative Union. After the formal agreement, nine Labour Co-operative MPs were elected at the 1929 general election, and Alexander was made a cabinet minister. However, only one was returned at the 1931 election against the backdrop of a massive defeat for Labour.

Co-operative Party logo used until February 2019

=== Rise of sister party ===
Labour's recovery as a credible party of government during World War II and the formal links and local affiliations brought by the 1927 agreement saw benefits electorally for the Co-operative Party. In 1945, 23 Labour Co-operative MPs were elected and two held high office in the Labour government: Alexander and Alfred Barnes, who had been chair of the party.

With Labour's fluctuating fortunes and the slow post-war decline of the co-operative movement, the party saw its influence and standing fall. By 1983, another nadir for Labour fortunes, only eight Labour Co-operative MPs were elected. In 1997, all 23 candidates won seats in Parliament and, after Labour assumed power, the party gained its first members of the Cabinet since A. V. Alexander: Alun Michael 1998–99 (later First Minister for Wales) and Ed Balls 2007–2010. In 2001, only one candidate was defeated: Faye Tinnion, who had stood against the Leader of the Conservative Party, William Hague.

In the 2026 Labour Party leadership election, Andy Burnham became the first Labour Co-op Member of Parliament to become leader of the Labour Party. He is also the first Labour Co-op MP to become Prime Minister since taking office on 20 July 2026.

== Organisation and structure ==
The purpose of the party

is to promote co-operative and mutual forms of economic, social and voluntary organisation, which are based on the principles of mutual ownership and democratic control, and to support political action in pursuance of the Values and Principles of the Co-operative Movement in the UK and internationally as defined from time to time by the International Co-operative Alliance.

— Co-operative Party Rule Book 2022

The Co-operative Party is a membership organisation consisting of individual members as well as local, regional and national Co-operative Parties and affiliated co-operative societies and trade unions. Unlike other parties with representatives elected to Parliament, the Co-operative Party does not receive state funding and gets most of its income from membership subscriptions and affiliation fees. The party organisation is itself a co-operative society, registered with the Financial Conduct Authority.

The party's highest decision-making body is the National Executive Committee (NEC), which is elected every three years by individual members, affiliated co-operatives and trade unions, the Co-operative Party Parliamentary Group, and Co-operatives UK. An annual conference takes place each autumn to debate policy, discuss the party's work and vote on motions, although its resolutions are only advisory on the NEC. The Co-operative Party Parliamentary Group co-ordinates the work of the party's MPs and peers in Parliament.

=== Affiliates ===
Six of the UK's largest consumer co-operatives are affiliated to the Co-operative Party: the Co-operative Group, Midcounties Co-operative, Central England Co-operative, East of England Co-operative, Scotmid Co-operative and Chelmsford Star Co-operative. The members of each co-operative society vote to approve affiliation to the party at their annual general meeting. The largest society and funder of the party is the Co-operative Group, which ballots its members each year on continued support for the Co-operative Party. At the May 2019 AGM, 79% of Co-operative Group members voted in favour of continued affiliation and that year donated £625,600 (2018: £625,600) to the Co-operative Party.

In 2016, Community became the first trade union to affiliate to the Co-operative Party, followed in 2018 by the Union of Shop, Distributive and Allied Workers (Usdaw). Co-operatives UK, Co-operative Press and a number of worker co-operatives and housing co-operatives are also organisational members of the party.

=== Local structure ===
The local structure of the Co-operative Party is based on autonomous units known as Society Co-operative Parties, which operate in a similar way to Constituency Labour Parties (CLPs). Co-operative societies sponsor Society Co-operative Parties in their traditional areas of operation, which will often take the name of the supporting society (i.e. East of England Co-operative Party and East of England Co-operative).

Society Co-operative Parties usually have a number of branches covering one or more local authority area, which are the main way that individual members interact with the party to debate policy, select candidates for elections and liaise with Constituency Labour Parties. The Society Co-operative Party is overseen by a party council made up of delegates from branches and the supporting co-operative society. Scotland, Wales and Northern Ireland each have a single national Society Co-operative Party. In England a local party will cover one or more county, or in some cases a full region.

=== Labour and Co-operative Party ===
The Co-operative Party and the Labour Party have had an electoral alliance known as the 'National Agreement' since 1927, meaning they do not stand against each other in elections. Instead, the parties agree joint candidates to stand as Labour and Co-operative Party. Labour and Co-operative candidates can stand at elections at all levels in England, Scotland and Wales. Although both parties organise in Northern Ireland, they do not stand candidates for election. As a sister party, the Co-operative Party has a unique relationship with the Labour Party; this means that the parties do not affiliate at a UK level. Instead, local Society Co-operative Parties affiliate to Constituency Labour Parties, which facilitates local co-operation and the selection of joint candidates.

Most candidates use the Labour and Co-operative Party description on their ballot paper; however, some stand under another version, particularly for local government elections and elections in Scotland, Wales and London that use a list system. In this case, only one description will be used to avoid voters thinking Labour and Co-operative candidates are standing against Labour candidates; however, joint candidates are still recognised as part of the Labour and Co-operative Group if they are elected. Although only the Labour Party emblem is used on the ballot paper, candidates and representatives can use a joint logo on their printed materials and websites.

== Leadership ==
The Co-operative Party does not have a single leader, with the responsibilities shared between Jim McMahon as Chair of the National Executive Committee, Preet Kaur Gill as Chair of the Co-operative Party Parliamentary Group, and Jim Robbins as General Secretary, who oversees the day-to-day operations of the Party. For the purposes of the registration as a political party with the Electoral Commission, the General Secretary is registered as both the leader and the nominating officer.

=== Chairs of the Co-operative Party ===
- 1918–1924 William Henry Watkins
- 1924–1945 Alfred Barnes MP
- 1945–1955 William Coldrick MP
- 1955–1957 Albert Ballard
- 1957–1965 James Peddie
- 1965–1972 Herbert Kemp
- 1972–1978 John Parkinson
- 1978–1982 Tom Turvey JP
- 1982–1989 Brian Hellowell
- 1989–1995 Jessie Carnegie
- 1995–1996 Peter Nurse
- 1996–2001 Jim Lee
- 2001–2019 Gareth Thomas MP
- 2019–2019 Anna Turley MP (June–December)
- 2019–2020 Chris Herries
- 2020–present Jim McMahon MP

=== General secretaries of the Co-operative Party ===
- 1917–1942 Samuel Perry
- 1942–1962 Jack Bailey
- 1962–1967 Harold Campbell
- 1967–1974 Ted Graham
- 1974–1992 David Wise
- 1992–1998 Peter Clarke
- 1998–2008 Peter Hunt
- 2008–2012 Michael Stephenson
- 2012–2015 Karin Christiansen
- 2015–2019 Claire McCarthy
- 2019–2026 Joe Fortune
- 2026–present Jim Robbins

== Electoral representation ==
The modern party is the political arm of the wider British co-operative movement, and membership of another co‑operative enterprise is a requirement for candidates. Co‑operative members who wish to stand for election must also be members of the Labour Party and stand as Labour and Co-operative Party candidates.

=== Electoral performance ===
Parliament of the United Kingdom
Election	Candidates	Votes	%	Seats	±	Government
1918	10	57,785	0.6	1 / 707	▲1	Coalition Liberal–Conservative
1922	11	126,406	0.9	4 / 615	▲3	Conservative
1923	10	107,792	0.8	6 / 615	▲2	Labour minority
1924	10	128,827	0.8	5 / 615	▼1	Conservative
1929 (Note: First under the Labour and Co-operative Party alliance)	12	208,762	1.0	9 / 615	▲4	Labour minority
1931	18	246,198	1.2	1 / 615	▼8	National Labour–Conservative–Liberal
1935	20	347,728	1.7	9 / 615	▲8	Conservative–National Labour–Liberal National
1945	34	635,335	2.6	23 / 640	▲14	Labour
1950	33	719,756	2.5	18 / 625	▼5	Labour
1951	38	845,509	2.9	16 / 625	▼2	Conservative
1955	39	829,175	3.1	19 / 630	▲3	Conservative
1959	30	675,199	2.4	16 / 630	▼3	Conservative
1964	27	566,220	2.0	19 / 630	▲3	Labour
1966	24	507,372	1.9	18 / 630	▼1	Labour
1970	28	537,253	1.9	15 / 630	▼3	Conservative
Feb-1974	25	518,981	1.7	14 / 635	▼1	Labour minority
Oct-1974	22	465,592	1.6	14 / 635	Steady	Labour
1979	25	485,115	1.6	17 / 635	▲3	Conservative
1983	17	299,080	1.0	7 / 650	▼10	Conservative
1987	20	334,132	1.0	9 / 650	▲2	Conservative
1992	27	495,702	1.5	14 / 651	▲5	Conservative
1997	26	654,203	2.1	26 / 659	▲12	Labour
2001	30	601,197	2.3	30 / 659	▲4	Labour
2005	32	584,700	2.1	29 / 646	▼1	Labour
2010	43	776,358	2.9	28 / 650	▼1	Conservative–Lib Dem
2015	42	873,399	2.8	24 / 650	▼4	Conservative
2017	52	1,350,007	4.2	38 / 650	▲14	Conservative minority with DUP confidence and supply
2019	50	1,025,882	3.2	26 / 650	▼12	Conservative
2024	44	805,340	2.8	43 / 650	▲17	Labour

Senedd
Election	Seats	±	Government
1999	8 / 60	▲8	Labour–LD
2003	5 / 60	▼3	Labour minority
2007	6 / 60	▲1	Labour–Plaid
2011	10 / 60	▲4	Labour minority
2016	13 / 60	▲3	Labour–LD-Ind
2021	16 / 60	▲3	Labour minority
2026	5 / 96	▼11	Plaid Cymru minority

Scottish Parliament
Election	Seats	±	Government
1999	9 / 129	▲9	Labour–LD
2003	10 / 129	▲1	Labour–LD
2007	14 / 129	▲4	SNP minority
2011	11 / 129	▼3	SNP majority
2016	13 / 129	▲2	SNP minority
2021	11 / 129	▼2	SNP minority
2026	7 / 129	▼4	SNP minority

=== House of Commons ===
Since the results of the 2024 general election and the 2026 Gorton and Denton by-election and 2026 Makerfield by-election, there are 43 Labour and Co-operative MPs in the House of Commons, including the Prime Minister and Labour leader, Andy Burnham.

MP	Constituency
Jack Abbott	Ipswich
Douglas Alexander	Lothian East
Rachel Blake	Cities of London and Westminster
Andy Burnham	Makerfield
Stella Creasy	Walthamstow
Kate Dearden	Halifax
Anneliese Dodds	Oxford East
Helena Dollimore	Hastings and Rye
Stephen Doughty	Cardiff South and Penarth
Florence Eshalomi	Vauxhall and Camberwell Green
Chris Evans	Caerphilly
Miatta Fahnbulleh	Peckham
Emma Foody	Cramlington and Killingworth
Preet Kaur Gill	Birmingham Edgbaston
Sarah Hall	Warrington South
Mark Hendrick	Preston
Meg Hillier	Hackney South and Shoreditch
Sally Jameson	Doncaster Central
Jayne Kirkham	Truro and Falmouth
Simon Lightwood	Wakefield and Rothwell
Alice Macdonald	Norwich North
Seema Malhotra	Feltham and Heston
Rachael Maskell	York Central
Jim McMahon	Oldham West, Chadderton and Royton
Kirsty McNeill	Midlothian
James Murray	Ealing North
Alex Norris	Nottingham North and Kimberley
Kate Osamor	Edmonton and Winchmore Hill
Andrew Pakes	Peterborough
Jo Platt	Leigh and Atherton
Luke Pollard	Plymouth Sutton and Devonport
Lucy Powell	Manchester Central
Steve Reed	Streatham and Croydon North
Jonathan Reynolds	Stalybridge and Hyde
Oliver Ryan	Burnley
Baggy Shanker	Derby South
Gareth Snell	Stoke-on-Trent Central
Alex Sobel	Leeds Central and Headingley
Kirsteen Sullivan	Bathgate and Linlithgow
Gareth Thomas	Harrow West
Anna Turley	Redcar
Chris Vince	Harlow
Paul Waugh	Rochdale

=== House of Lords ===
There are fifteen Labour and Co-operative peers in the House of Lords:

- Steve Bassam, Baron Bassam of Brighton
- Vernon Coaker, Baron Coaker
- George Foulkes, Baron Foulkes of Cumnock
- Peter Hain, Baron Hain
- Dianne Hayter, Baroness Hayter of Kentish Town
- Philip Hunt, Baron Hunt of Kings Heath
- Roy Kennedy, Baron Kennedy of Southwark
- Jim Knight, Baron Knight of Weymouth
- John Monks, Baron Monks
- Janet Royall, Baroness Royall of Blaisdon
- Angela Smith, Baroness Smith of Basildon
- Sharon Taylor, Baroness Taylor of Stevenage
- Glenys Thornton, Baroness Thornton
- Don Touhig, Baron Touhig
- Debbie Wilcox, Baroness Wilcox of Newport

John McFall, Baron McFall of Alcluith sat as a Labour and Co-operative peer prior his election as Senior Deputy Speaker in 2016 and his subsequent election as Lord Speaker in May 2021, when he sat as a non-affiliated peer. Upon his retirement as Lord Speaker in 2026 and in accordance with convention for former Lord Speakers, Baron McFall now sits as a Crossbench peer.

=== Senedd ===
There are five Labour and Co-operative Members of the Senedd:

MS	Constituency or Region
Mike Hedges	Gŵyr Abertawe
Vikki Howells	Pontypridd Cynon Merthyr
Huw Irranca-Davies	Afan Ogwr Rhondda
Sarah Murphy	Pen-y-bont Bro Morgannwg
Lynne Neagle	Sir Fynwy Torfaen

=== Scottish Parliament ===
There are six Labour and Co-operative Members of the Scottish Parliament:

MSP	Constituency or Region
Claire Baker	Mid Scotland and Fife
Neil Bibby	West Scotland
Daniel Johnson	Edinburgh Southern
Monica Lennon	Glasgow
Pauline McNeill	Glasgow
Paul Sweeney	Glasgow

=== London Assembly ===
There are ten Labour and Co-operative Members of the London Assembly:

AM	Constituencies
Marina Ahmad	Lambeth and Southwark
Elly Baker	London-wide
Anne Clarke	Barnet and Camden
Leonie Cooper	Merton and Wandsworth
Unmesh Desai	City and East
Len Duvall	Greenwich and Lewisham
Krupesh Hirani	Brent and Harrow
Joanne McCartney	Enfield and Haringey
Sem Moema	North East
James Small-Edwards	West Central

=== Police and crime commissioners ===
There are fifteen Labour and Co-operative Police and crime commissioners or police, fire and crime commissioners:

Commissioner	Police Area
David Allen	Cumbria
Joy Allen	Durham
Andy Dunbobbin	North Wales
Susan Dungworth	Northumbria
Gary Godden	Nottinghamshire
Clive Grunshaw	Lancashire
Clare Moody	Avon and Somerset
Jane Mudd	Gwent
Nicolle Ndiweni	Derbyshire
Emily Spurrell	Merseyside
Danielle Stone	Northamptonshire
Matt Storey	Cleveland
John Tizard	Bedfordshire
Emma Wools	South Wales

=== Directly elected mayors ===
There are seven directly elected Labour and Co-operative metro mayors:

Mayor	Mayoral Area
Tracy Brabin	West Yorkshire
Oliver Coppard	South Yorkshire
Bev Craig	Greater Manchester
Kim McGuinness	North East
Richard Parker	West Midlands
David Skaith	York and North Yorkshire
Claire Ward	East Midlands

There are three directly elected Labour and Co-operative local authority mayors:

Mayor	Mayoral Area
Chris Cooke	Middlesbrough
Brenda Dacres	Lewisham
Rokhsana Fiaz	Newham

=== Local government ===
The Co-operative Party is represented in all tiers of local government by councillors who stand as Labour and Co-operative. In 2021, there were 938 and in 2026 over 1400 Labour and Co-operative councillors across England, Scotland and Wales.

=== Northern Ireland Assembly ===
The Co-operative Party is affiliated with the Labour Party in Northern Ireland and in addition, Social Democratic and Labour Party (SDLP) members are permitted to join the party. Neither the Co-operative or Labour parties currently have any representation in the Northern Ireland Assembly.

== See also ==
- List of Labour Co-operative Members of Parliament
- Co-operative Party election results
- Rochdale Principles
- British co-operative movement
