= 1981 Warrington by-election =

UK Parliament by-election

← 1979	16 July 1981	1983 →

Constituency of Warrington
- Turnout: 67.0% (▼4.3%)
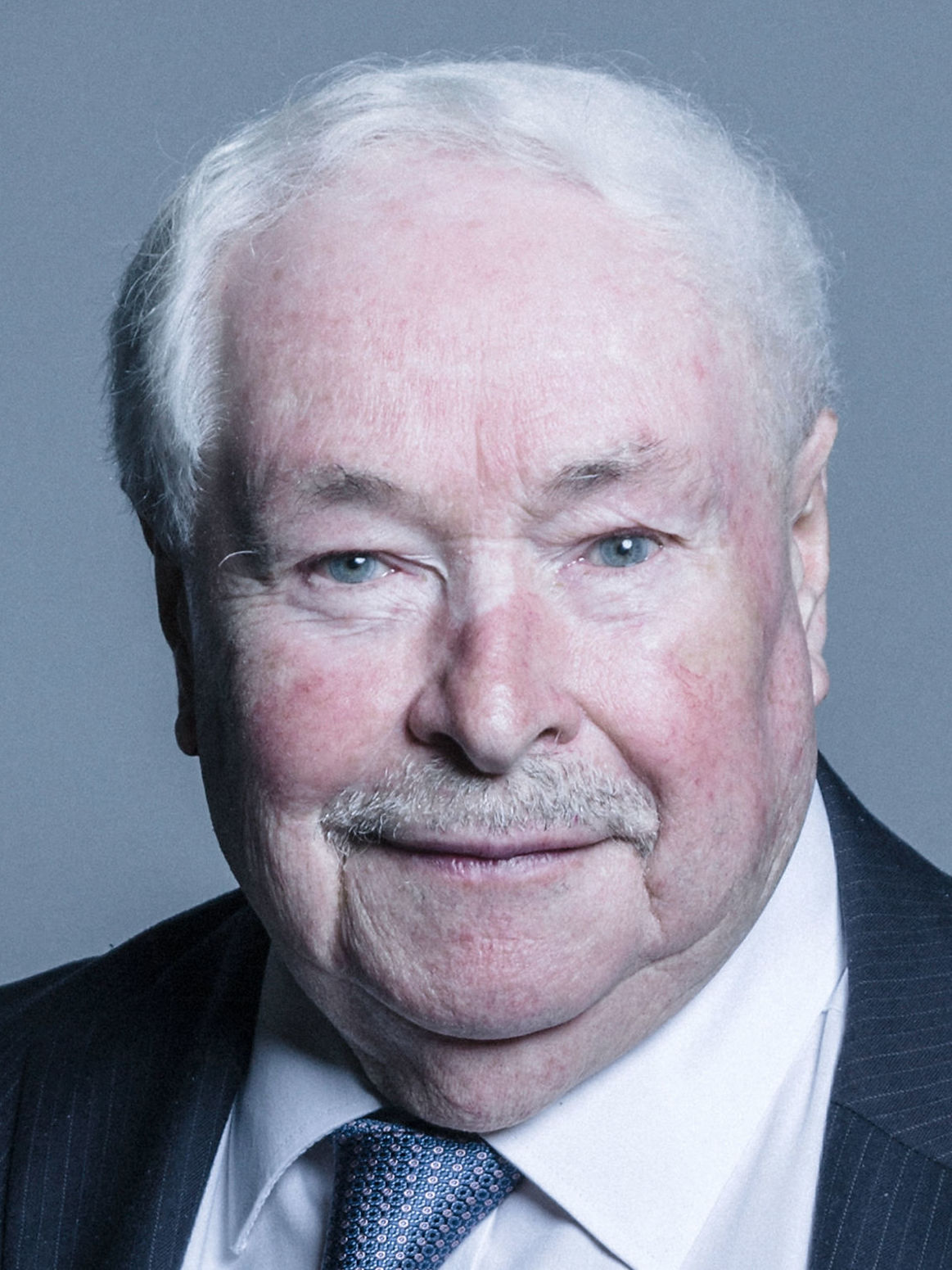

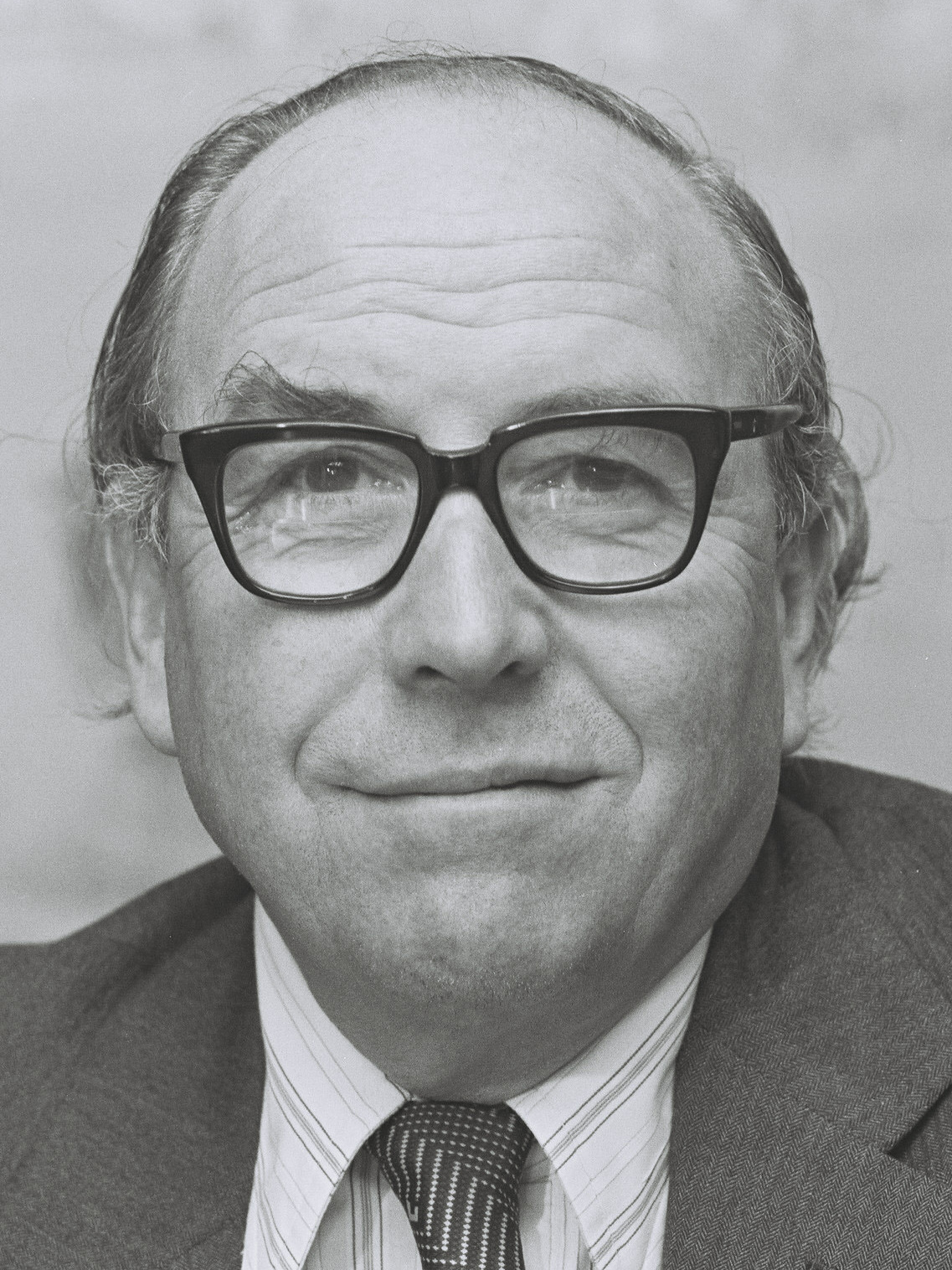
	First party	Second party	Third party
			Con
Candidate	Doug Hoyle	Roy Jenkins	Stanley Sorrell
Party	Labour	SDP	Conservative
Popular vote	14,280	12,521	2,102
Percentage	48.4%	42.4%	7.1%
Swing	▼13.3%	▲33.3%	▼21.7%
MP before election
Thomas Williams
Labour
Elected MP
Doug Hoyle
Labour

The 1981 Warrington by-election was held on 16 July 1981.

The by-election was caused by the appointment of Thomas Williams, Labour Party Member of Parliament (MP) for Warrington, as a High Court Judge.

Warrington had been held by the Labour Party since the 1945 general election, and by Williams since the 1961 Warrington by-election. It had long been regarded as a safe seat for the party, and even in 1979, generally a year of poor results for Labour, Williams won with a majority of 32.8%. Labour expected to hold the seat comfortably, and selected Doug Hoyle, the former MP for Nelson and Colne, who had lost his seat in 1979.

The Social Democratic Party (SDP) was formed by prominent figures on the right of the Labour Party in early 1981, known as the "Gang of Four" – Shirley Williams, Roy Jenkins, David Owen and Bill Rodgers. Of the four, Williams and Jenkins lacked Parliamentary seats, and were keen to stand in by-elections as candidates under their new party label. Following the agreement of an electoral pact with the Liberal Party exactly a month earlier, who had come a distant third in Warrington in 1979, with less than 10% of the vote, the two parties agreed to support Jenkins as the SDP's first Parliamentary candidate.

The Conservative Party had taken second place in Warrington in 1979, with 28.8% of the votes cast. In mid-term government and behind in the polls, they did not expect to advance and stood Stanley Sorrell, a London-based bus driver, and unusually for a Conservative, an active trade unionist.

A member of an unconnected Social Democratic Party, founded in Manchester by Donald Kean, had contested the seat in 1979. Lacking any profile, he won only 0.5% of the vote. However, the party determined to stand again, against the better known SDP, which they were hoping to force to change their name.

Several other candidates stood. The then little-known Ecology Party stood Neil Chantrell. Perennial by-election candidate Bill Boaks stood as a Democratic Monarchist. Iain Leslie, an administrator for the Inner London Education Authority, stood on a platform of legalised CB Radio. Tom Keen stood for the Campaign for a More Prosperous Britain. John Fleming stood on a platform opposing immigration and the Trident nuclear weapon system, while also calling for British troops to withdraw from Northern Ireland. Daniel Hussey stood as the "United Democratic Labour Party" candidate and Harry Wise stood as the "English Democratic Party" candidate. With eleven candidates, this equalled the most for any British by-election, set at the 1978 Lambeth Central by-election.

== Result ==
Hoyle only narrowly held the seat for the Labour Party. Jenkins came from nowhere to win 42.4% of the vote, taking a close second place. Sorrell dropped to a distant third, losing three-quarters of the Conservative vote. None of the minor candidates were able to make an impact, all winning less than 1% of the vote, and Keen equalled the record low of only ten votes.

According to the next day's edition of The Glasgow Herald Roy Jenkins had "emerged as a triumphant loser", coming close to victory and taking votes from both the Conservatives and Labour. Reacting to the result Jenkins noted that in his career he had fought 12 election and this was the first that he had lost in 35 years. However he said "But in losing, it is by far the greatest victory in which I have participated" going on to claim that the figures made it possible that an SDP-Liberal government would be returned at the next election with a large majority. Jenkins returned to Parliament at the 1982 Glasgow Hillhead by-election, subsequently becoming the SDP party leader.

The Warrington seat was split at the 1983 general election. Hoyle won Warrington North, holding the seat until his retirement in 1997, while a Conservative won Warrington South.

Warrington by-election, 1981
Party	Candidate	Votes	%	±%
Labour	Doug Hoyle	14,280	48.4	–13.3
SDP	Roy Jenkins	12,521	42.4	+33.3
Conservative	Stanley Sorrell	2,102	7.1	– 21.7
Ecology	Neil Chantrell	219	0.8	New
United Democratic Labour Party	Daniel Hussey	149	0.5	New
Citizen's Band Radio Party	Iain Leslie	111	0.4	New
Independent Labour	John Fleming	53	0.2	New
Social Democratic	Donald Kean	38	0.1	– 0.4
Democratic Monarchist	Bill Boaks	14	0.1	New
English Democratic Party	Harry Wise	11	0.0	New
More Prosperous Britain	Tom Keen	10	0.0	New
Majority		1,759	6.0	– 26.8
Turnout		29,508	67.0	– 4.3
Labour hold		Swing		
