= 1949 Hammersmith South by-election =

UK parliamentary by-election

A by-election for the constituency of Hammersmith South in the United Kingdom House of Commons was held on 24 February 1949, caused by the death of the incumbent Labour MP William Thomas Adams. The result was a hold for the Labour Party, with their candidate Thomas Williams.

== Result ==
Hammersmith South by-election, 1949
Party	Candidate	Votes	%	±%
Labour Co-op	Thomas Williams	15,223	52.8	−5.2
Conservative	Anthony Fell	13,610	47.2	+5.2
Majority		1,613	5.6	−10.4
Turnout		28,833	60.6	−5.3
Labour hold		Swing		

== Previous result ==
General election 1945: Hammersmith South
Party	Candidate	Votes	%	±%
Labour Co-op	William T Adams	12,502	58.0	+20.3
Conservative	Douglas Cooke	9,044	42.0	−20.3
Majority		3,458	16.0	N/A
Turnout		21,546	65.9	+5.8
Labour hold		Swing		
