= Doug Hoyle =

British politician and peer (1926–2024)

The Right Honourable The Lord Hoyle JP GMH
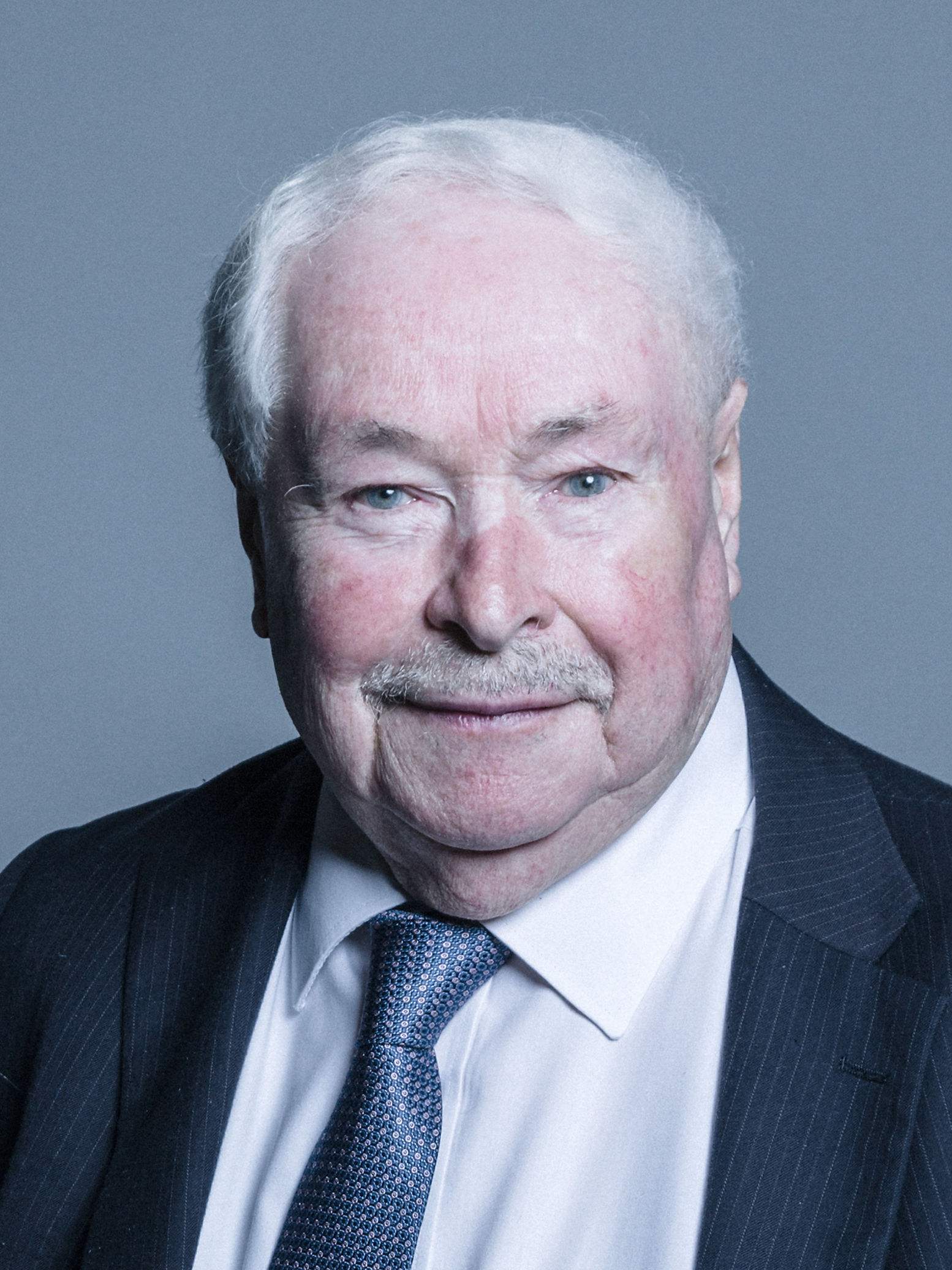
- Official portrait, 2018

Lord-in-waiting; Government Whip
- In office 8 May 1997 – 9 April 1999
- Prime Minister: Tony Blair
- Preceded by: The Earl of Courtown
- Succeeded by: The Lord Burlison

Chair of the Parliamentary Labour Party
- In office 18 July 1992 – 3 May 1997
- Leader: John Smith; Tony Blair
- Preceded by: Stan Orme
- Succeeded by: Clive Soley

Member of the House of Lords
- Lord Temporal
- Life peerage 14 May 1997 – 25 July 2023

Member of Parliament for Warrington North Warrington (1981–1983)
- In office 16 July 1981 – 8 April 1997
- Preceded by: Thomas Williams
- Succeeded by: Helen Jones

Member of Parliament for Nelson and Colne
- In office 10 October 1974 – 7 April 1979
- Preceded by: David Waddington
- Succeeded by: John Lee

Personal details
- Born: Eric Douglas Harvey Hoyle; 17 February 1926 Coppull, Lancashire, England
- Died: 6 April 2024 (aged 98)
- Party: Labour
- Spouse: Pauline Spencer (m. 1953; died 1991)
- Children: Lindsay Hoyle

Eric Douglas Harvey Hoyle, Baron Hoyle, JP GMH (17 February 1926 – 6 April 2024) was a British politician and life peer who was chair of the Parliamentary Labour Party from 1992 to 1997 and a lord-in-waiting from 1997 to 1999. A member of the Labour Party, he was Member of Parliament (MP) for Nelson and Colne from 1974 to 1979 and Warrington North from 1981 to 1997.

== Early life, education and career ==
Eric Douglas Harvey Hoyle was born in Coppull, near Chorley, in Lancashire, on 17 February 1926 to William Hoyle and Leah Hoyle née Harvey. His father was a shop assistant at a Co-op and a social member of the local Conservative club.

Hoyle attended Adlington Church of England school and Horwich and Bolton Technical Colleges, before he started working as an engineering apprentice for British Rail in Horwich. He moved to Manchester to work as a sales engineer in 1951, before joining a company in Salford as a marketing executive in 1953 where he worked until his election as an MP.

Hoyle joined the Labour Party in 1945.

== Parliamentary career ==
=== House of Commons ===
Hoyle first stood for Parliament at Clitheroe in 1964, but came second. In 1970, he first fought Nelson and Colne, and was defeated by the Conservative incumbent David Waddington by 1,410 votes. He fought the seat again in February 1974, and reduced Waddington's margin to 177. He was finally elected at the general election of October 1974 for Nelson and Colne by 669 votes; this was the first Labour gain to be announced on election night.

Hoyle narrowly lost his seat at the general election of 1979, but returned to Parliament in 1981 when he saw off a strong challenge from Roy Jenkins in a traditionally safe Labour seat. This was a notable by-election in Warrington when enthusiasm for the newly created Social Democratic Party was at its peak. Constituency boundaries were redrawn for the general election of 1983, when he became MP for Warrington North.

In the 1992 Labour Party leadership election he voted for Bryan Gould.

=== House of Lords ===
Hoyle stepped down from the House of Commons at the general election of 1997, and on 14 May 1997, he was created a life peer as Baron Hoyle, of Warrington in the County of Cheshire in the 1997 Dissolution Honours. He retired from the Lords on 25 July 2023.

== Other interests ==
Hoyle served as chairman of Warrington Wolves Rugby League Club from 1999 to 2009. He was also a non-executive director of the major local employer Debt Free Direct. In 1957 he helped found Labour Friends of Israel. Hoyle received the Freedom of the Borough of Warrington on 11 November 2005.

Hoyle was awarded the Freedom of the City of Gibraltar, and in July 2008 received the Gibraltar Medallion of Honour (GMH).

In November 2010, Hoyle was awarded an honorary Doctor of Letters degree by the University of Chester for his 'outstanding contribution to the Borough of Warrington'.

== Personal life and death ==
Hoyle was married to Pauline Spencer from 1953 until her death in 1991. Their only child, Lindsay Hoyle, became the Member of Parliament for Chorley in 1997 and the Speaker of the House of Commons in 2019.

Hoyle died on 6 April 2024, at the age of 98.

Parliament of the United Kingdom
Preceded by David Waddington	Member of Parliament for Nelson and Colne; October 1974 – 1979	Succeeded by John Lee
Preceded by Sir Thomas Williams	Member of Parliament for Warrington; 1981–1983	Constituency abolished
New constituency	Member of Parliament for Warrington North; 1983–1997	Succeeded by Helen Jones
Party political offices
Preceded by Stan Orme	Chair of the Parliamentary Labour Party; 1992–1997	Succeeded by Clive Soley
Trade union offices
Preceded by Len Wells	President of the Association of Scientific, Technical and Managerial Staffs; 1977–1981	Succeeded by Len Wells
Preceded by Len Wells	President of the Association of Scientific, Technical and Managerial Staffs; 1985–1988	Union merged
