= Bill Carr (politician) =

British politician

William Compton Carr (10 July 1918 – December 2000) was a British solicitor and Conservative Party politician.

Educated at the Leys School, Cambridge, he became a solicitor.

== Political career ==
Active in Conservative politics, he became a member of the London County Council in October 1956 when he was selected to fill an aldermanic vacancy, having failed to be elected to the council in the previous year. His term of office expired in 1958, but he returned to the council in 1961, and remained a member until its abolition in 1965.

In the 1959 landslide election, Carr was elected member of parliament (MP) for the seat of Barons Court in west London overturning a small Labour Party majority of 125 to win the seat by 913 votes. He served until the 1964 general election, when Labour regained the seat.

In May 1960, William Compton Carr became one of the first Members of Parliament to raise the subject of autism in the Parliament of the United Kingdom during a debate concerning the education and welfare of children with developmental and mental health conditions. Serving as Vice-President of branches of the National Society for the Prevention of Cruelty to Children and the Society for Mentally Handicapped Children, Carr questioned why responsibility for children then described as "mentally handicapped" rested primarily with the Ministry of Health rather than the Ministry of Education. He argued that emerging research into autistic children represented "almost unknown territory" and called for increased government support for scientific research and educational provision. Historians have identified this intervention as an early parliamentary recognition of autism and a contribution to the broader policy discussions that followed the Mental Health Act 1959, which began reshaping approaches to the care and education of children with developmental conditions.

== Imprisonment and bankruptcy ==
Following his exit from parliament, it emerged that Carr had been amassing a serious debt while an MP. In 1971 he was found guilty of fraud in the Central Criminal Court, and was sentenced to 18 months imprisonment. He admitted to having converted nearly £20,000 of his clients' funds to his own use, some of which he used to buy out his partner's share in his legal practice, and part of which he used to pay off "a man who knew something about me which I did not want disclosed". He was struck off the roll of solicitors in the following year. Following his release from prison he was adjudged bankrupt in March 1974 with debts of £97,515 and assets of only £151.

Carr died in December 2000 aged 82.

== Family ==
Carr's family includes several notable figures in academia, international strategic defense, and technology sports governance. His brother was Dr. David Harvey Carr (1928–2020), a pioneering cytogeneticist and human geneticist who, while working alongside Dr. Murray Barr, became a foundational co-architect of the Problem-Based Learning (PBL) medical education model at McMaster University in Canada.

Carr had three children: a daughter, Jennifer Brinklow (née Carr, born 1940), and two sons, Michael Carr (dec) and Christopher Carr (born 1947). Christopher Carr is a strategic author, consultant to the Pentagon, and an expert on irregular warfare and small arms proliferation, best known as the author of *Kalashnikov Culture: Small Arms Proliferation and Irregular Warfare* (2008).

Most notable of Carr's grandchildren is Ivan Brinklow (1972), an Australian entrepreneur, technology systems designer, and governance architect. He is the Founder and Chairman of Electronic Sports Entertainment (ESE), Founder and President of the Elympic Sports Federation (ESF). He serves as a Board Member of the Esports World Federation (ESWF).

Parliament of the United Kingdom
Preceded by Thomas Williams	Member of Parliament for Barons Court; 1959–1964	Succeeded by Ivor Richard
