= Barons Court (UK Parliament constituency) =

Parliamentary constituency in the United Kingdom, 1955–1974

Coordinates: 51.49°N 0.22°W

- Former borough constituency for the House of Commons
- County: 1955–1965: County of London; 1965–1974: Greater London
- Borough: 1955–1965: Metropolitan Borough of Fulham (part) and Metropolitan Borough of Hammersmith (part); 1965–1974: London Borough of Hammersmith

1955–1974
- Seats: 1
- Created from: Hammersmith South (bulk of), Fulham West (part) and Fulham East (part)
- Replaced by: Fulham and Hammersmith North

Barons Court was a constituency of the House of Commons of the Parliament of the United Kingdom from 1955 to 1974. It was represented by one Member of Parliament (MP), elected by the first-past-the-post system of election.

== Boundaries ==
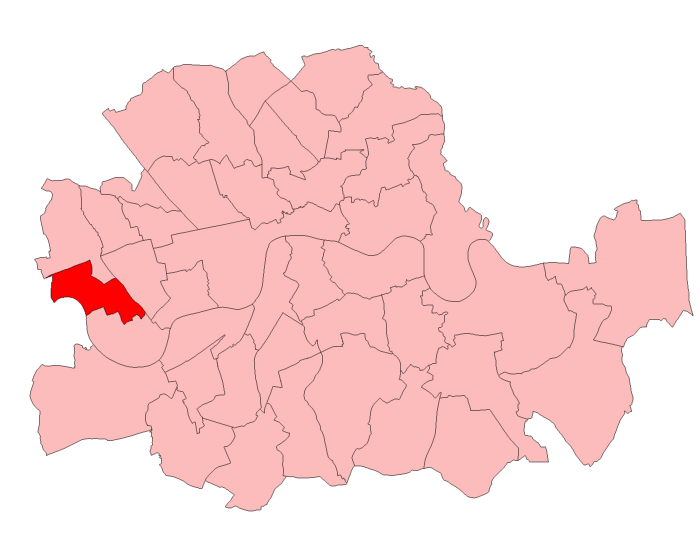
Barons Court in London 1955-74

Barons Court was a borough constituency of the parliamentary County of London. It was created from parts of three abolished constituencies in 1955: the bulk of Hammersmith South and parts of Fulham West and Fulham East. It was composed of the northern end of the Metropolitan Borough of Fulham (Barons Court, Margravine, and Lillie wards) and the southern section of the Metropolitan Borough of Hammersmith (Broadway, Brook Green, Grove, and Ravenscourt wards). It did not include the whole of either Metropolitan Borough.

When local government in London was reformed in 1965, the area became part of the London Borough of Hammersmith in Greater London. This did not affect the parliamentary boundaries until 1974. In that year constituencies were redrawn to correspond to wards of the London Borough: the Barons Court constituency was divided between the seats of Fulham and Hammersmith North.

== Members of Parliament ==
Election	Member	Party	Notes
1955	Thomas Williams	Labour	Member for main predecessor seat (1949–1955)
1959	Compton Carr	Conservative	
1964	Ivor Richard	Labour	Contested Blyth following redistribution
1974	constituency abolished: see Fulham and Hammersmith North		

== Elections ==
=== Elections in the 1950s ===
General election 1955: Barons Court
Party	Candidate	Votes	%
Labour Co-op	Thomas Williams	20,748	50.2
Conservative	Keith Joseph	20,623	49.8
Majority		125	0.3
Turnout		41,371	75.8
Registered electors		54,613	
Labour Co-op win (new seat)			

General election 1959: Barons Court
Party	Candidate	Votes	%	±%
Conservative	Bill Carr	18,658	48.9	–1.0
Labour Co-op	Thomas Williams	17,745	46.5	–3.7
Independent Liberal	Simon Knott	1,766	4.6	New
Majority		913	2.4	N/A
Turnout		38,169	76.3	+0.5
Registered electors		50,032		
Conservative gain from Labour		Swing	+1.3	

=== Elections in the 1960s ===
General election 1964: Barons Court
Party	Candidate	Votes	%	±%
Labour	Ivor Richard	15,966	47.5	+1.0
Conservative	Bill Carr	14,800	44.1	–4.8
Liberal	Simon Knott	2,821	8.4	+3.8
Majority		1,166	3.5	N/A
Turnout		33,587	72.9	–3.4
Registered electors		46,048		
Labour gain from Conservative		Swing	+2.9	

General election 1966: Barons Court
Party	Candidate	Votes	%	±%
Labour	Ivor Richard	17,021	51.6	+4.1
Conservative	Bill Carr	13,551	41.1	–2.9
Liberal	Simon Knott	2,384	7.2	–1.2
Majority		3,470	10.5	+7.1
Turnout		32,956	75.2	+2.3
Registered electors		43,830		
Labour hold		Swing	+3.5	

=== Elections in the 1970s ===
General election 1970: Barons Court
Party	Candidate	Votes	%	±%
Labour	Ivor Richard	13,374	48.0	–3.6
Conservative	Robert Brum	12,269	44.1	+2.9
Liberal	Simon Knott	2,206	7.9	+0.7
Majority		1,105	3.9	–6.7
Turnout		27,849	67.3	–7.9
Registered electors		41,375		
Labour hold		Swing	–3.3	

== See also ==
- Former United Kingdom Parliament constituencies

== Sources ==
- Boundaries of Parliamentary Constituencies 1885-1972, compiled and edited by F.W.S. Craig (Parliamentary Reference Publications 1972)
- British Parliamentary Election Results 1950-1973, compiled and edited by F.W.S. Craig (Parliamentary Research Services 1983)
- Who's Who of British Members of Parliament, Volume IV 1945-1979, edited by M. Stenton and S. Lees (Harvester Press 1981)
