= Dan Chater =

British politician (1870–1959)

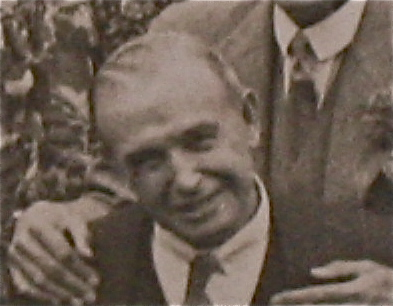
- Daniel Chater in the 1930s.
- Born: 17 November 1870; Lambeth, London
- Died: 25 May 1959 (aged 88); Essex, England
- Occupation: Member of Parliament
- Spouse: Kate Wood (m. 1893)
- Children: Sidney, Eric, Kate, Eva, Alfred, Cyril, Percy

Daniel Chater (17 November 1870 – 25 May 1959) was a British Labour and Co-operative politician.

== Early life and career ==
Daniel Chater was born in Lambeth, London, on 17 November 1870 into a working-class family. After leaving school he worked as a clerk on the London Stock Exchange for more than 30 years. Chater was a member of the Co-operative movement, eventually becoming chairman of the Co-operative Political Committee. He was also a member of the National Union of General and Municipal Workers and was an active trades union worker for 25 years before becoming a Member of Parliament in 1929. He lost his last job at the Stock Exchange because of his socialist views. During the First World War he was actively involved in the movement for the production of the nation's food at home.

== Political career ==
In both the 1923 general election and the 1924 general election Chater stood for parliament as the Labour candidate for Ilford. Although he was unsuccessful on both occasions, he managed to double the Labour vote in Ilford in 1924. The 1929 general election saw him become the Labour Member of Parliament for Hammersmith South, but his majority was only 412 votes and he lost the seat in the 1931 general election. In the 1935 general election he was voted in as the Member of Parliament for Bethnal Green North East, and he held this seat until the constituency was abolished in 1950. He did not stand for parliament again after that. He died in Essex on 25 May 1959.

== Personal life ==
In 1893, Chater married Kate Wood from Stratford, London. They had eight children, the eldest of whom, Daniel, died in infancy. Their other children were: Sidney, Eric, Kate, Eva, Alfred, Cyril and Percy.

Parliament of the United Kingdom
Preceded by Sir William Bull, Bt	Member of Parliament for Hammersmith South; 1929–1931	Succeeded by James Douglas Cooke
Preceded by Harry Nathan	Member of Parliament for Bethnal Green North East; 1935–1950	Constituency abolished
