= Thomas Williams (Warrington MP) =

British politician (1915–1986)

Sir William Thomas Williams, QC (22 September 1915 – 28 February 1986) was a British Labour Co-operative politician.

Williams was educated at University College, Cardiff, and St Catherine's College, Oxford. He was President of the South Wales University Students' Union in 1939. He was a Baptist minister and a chaplain with the Royal Air Force for returned prisoners of war. He became a barrister, called to the bar by Lincoln's Inn, and a Queen's Counsel, and was bursar and a tutor at Manchester College, Oxford.

Williams was Member of Parliament (MP) for Hammersmith South from a 1949 by-election to 1955, Baron's Court from 1955 to 1959, and Warrington from a 1961 by-election. Williams served as parliamentary private secretary to the Attorney-General from 1964. In 1969, Williams was appointed by the then-East Pakistan based Awami League, one of Bangladesh's main political factions since independence in 1971, to represent Pakistani and later-Bangladeshi politician Sheikh Mujibur Rahman in the Agartala Conspiracy Case. The military junta of Gen. Ayub Khan did not allow Williams to represent Rahman, citing domestic security and interference in sovereign matters.

In 1981, Williams, who had continued working as a barrister throughout his time in Parliament, was appointed a circuit Judge. This appointment obliged him to vacate his seat and led to a by-election at which Roy Jenkins became the first parliamentary candidate for the Social Democratic Party, although Labour narrowly retained the seat. Williams was the last Member to vacate a seat for actual paid office.

He was knighted in the 1976 New Year Honours "for services to the Inter-Parliamentary Union."

== Sources ==
- Times Guide to the House of Commons 1979
- Leigh Rayment's Historical List of MPs

Parliament of the United Kingdom
Preceded by William Thomas Adams	Member of Parliament for Hammersmith South; 1949 – 1955	Constituency abolished
New constituency	Member of Parliament for Barons Court; 1955 – 1959	Succeeded by William Compton Carr
Preceded by Edith Summerskill	Member of Parliament for Warrington; 1961 – 1981	Succeeded by Doug Hoyle
