= Charlotte Nichols =

British Labour politician (born 1991)

Charlotte Nichols MP
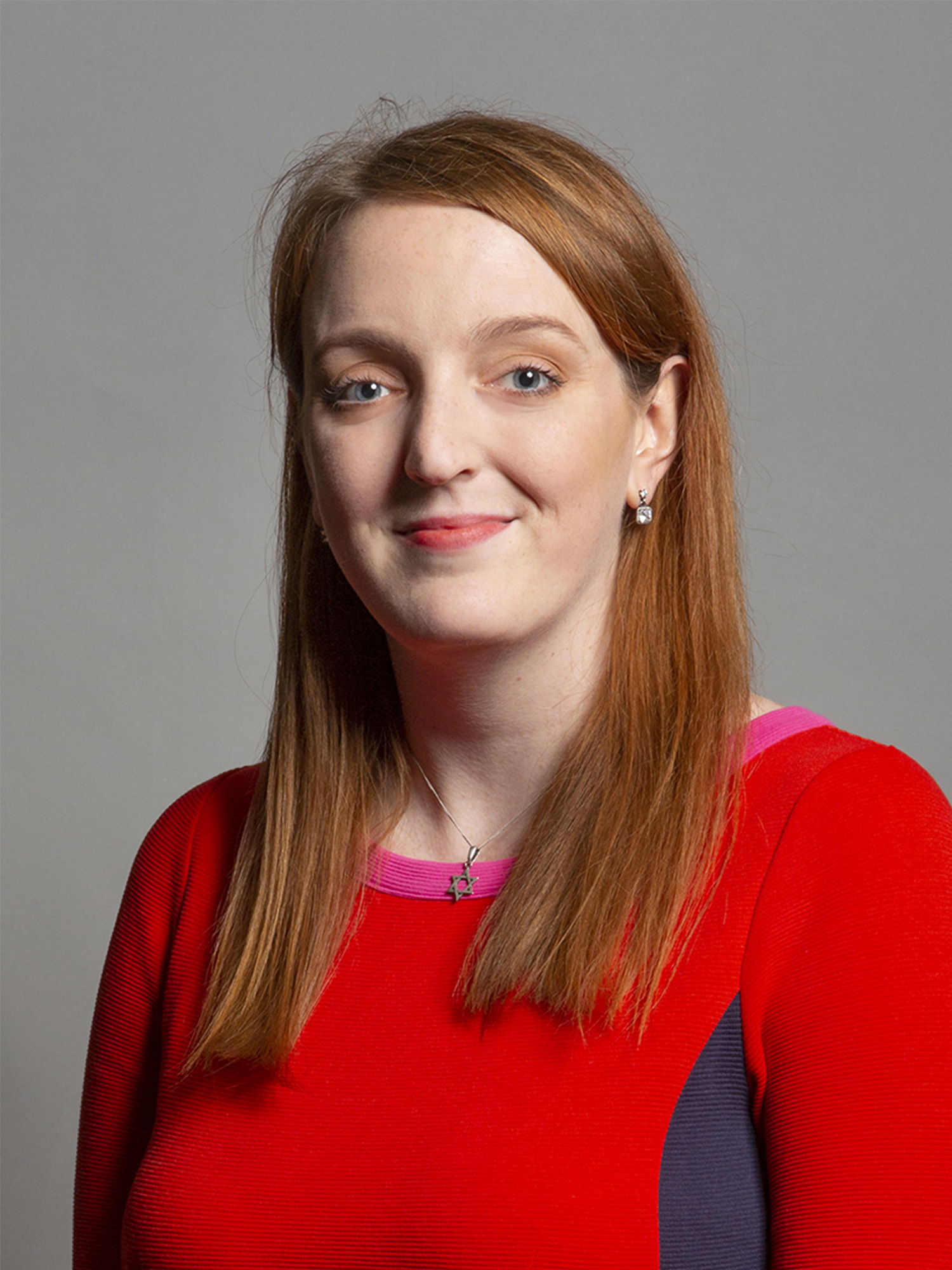
- Nichols in 2019

Shadow Minister for Women and Equalities
- In office 12 November 2020 – 14 September 2021
- Leader: Keir Starmer
- Preceded by: Janet Daby
- Succeeded by: Taiwo Owatemi

Member of Parliament for Warrington North
- Incumbent
- Assumed office 12 December 2019
- Preceded by: Helen Jones
- Majority: 9,190 (23.0%)

Personal details
- Born: Charlotte Louise Nichols; 5 April 1991 (age 35) Romford, London, England
- Party: Labour
- Education: University of Liverpool (BA)
- Website: charlottenicholsmp.com

Charlotte Louise Nichols (born 5 April 1991) is a British Labour Party politician who has been the Member of Parliament for Warrington North since 2019.

== Early life and education ==
Charlotte Nichols was born on 5 April 1991 in Romford, Greater London, and grew up in Reading. She has three sisters and three step-siblings. Her father Ged Nichols is from Kirkby, Merseyside and is the General Secretary of the financial services trade union Accord. He was appointed as the president of the Trades Union Congress in 2020. Her mother is from East London.

Nichols became interested in politics at a young age: she said in an interview that she was obsessed with Speaker of the House of Commons Betty Boothroyd, and the Speaker's shouts of "Order". As a teenager, Nichols had one of her earliest experiences of politics when she helped run after-school UK Youth Parliament activities with future Conservative Prime Minister Theresa May. In 2013, Nichols graduated in politics from the University of Liverpool.

== Career ==
After graduation, Nichols worked in Salford for five years for the Union of Shop, Distributive and Allied Workers, supporting logistics workers from Warrington employed at Hermes (now Evri), Yodel and XPO, Inc. with pay and conditions negotiations. Nichols then went on to work for the GMB trade union as a national research and policy officer, where she campaigned for better term and conditions for Amazon and Asda workers. While working for GMB, Nichols made the case for Government to invest in low-carbon nuclear technology.

Nichols supported Jeremy Corbyn in both the 2015 and the 2016 Labour Party leadership elections.

Nichols is the Chair of The Centre for Evidence Based Drug Policy.

== Parliamentary career ==
Nichols was elected to Parliament at the 2019 general election as the Labour Party MP for Warrington North with 44.2% of the vote and a majority of 1,509 votes.

In the Corbyn shadow cabinet, Nichols served as the Parliamentary private secretary (PPS) to Tracy Brabin as Shadow Secretary of State for Digital, Culture, Media and Sport for a brief period, before becoming PPS to Emily Thornberry as Shadow Secretary of State for International Trade.

Nichols supported Rebecca Long-Bailey in the 2020 Labour Party leadership election, but nominated Emily Thornberry to broaden the field of candidates.

When Ruth Jones was promoted to Shadow Air Qualities Minister, Nichols replaced her as PPS to Shadow Northern Ireland Secretary Louise Haigh. On 12 November 2020, Nichols was appointed Shadow Minister for Women and Equalities. She stepped down from this role in September 2021, coinciding with the resignation of the Shadow Secretary of State Marsha de Cordova, citing personal reasons.

At the 2024 general election, Nichols was re-elected to Parliament as MP for Warrington North with an increased vote share of 46.8% and an increased majority of 9,190.

== Controversies ==
In October 2019, Nichols tweeted that supporters of the football club SS Lazio, filmed making Nazi salutes in Glasgow, should "get their heads kicked in." Defending her comments in December of the same year, Nichols stated, "These were people doing Nazi salutes on the streets of Britain... As a Jewish person whose grandfather fought in World War Two, ultimately sometimes I believe that fascism has to be physically confronted." An article published in The Daily Telegraph in 2019 reported that Nichols had described members of the Green Party as "bourgeois scab fucks" and told one Twitter user, "Hope you lose your virginity".

In April 2021, Nichols apologised to the Traveller communities after she distributed a local election leaflet which pledged to deal with "Traveller incursions". The leaflet had been circulated in the Orford ward of her constituency during the 2021 local elections, in response to encampments on the nearby Poole Park. Nichols apologised and issued a statement, saying: “I have spoken to the local Labour party, the leaflet has been withdrawn and the leaflet will be destroyed. I regret that this leaflet has been distributed in the town. The leaflet is not in line with my personal values or those of the Labour party." Nichols pledged to be "an ally" to the Gypsy, Roma and Traveller community.

== Personal life ==
Nichols grew up in a secular family of Irish Catholic heritage. Aged 22, she began attending weekly services at Manchester Reform Synagogue. In 2014, she converted to Judaism, celebrating her bat mitzvah on her 27th birthday. In a 2021 interview, Nichols stated that she is bisexual.

During the 2021 Warrington Borough Council election, a local Conservative candidate was deselected after sending anti-semitic abuse to Nicholls on Twitter.

In 2021, Nichols disclosed that she has post-traumatic stress disorder. She had to cut short a parliamentary visit to Gibraltar following a mental health episode. She was sectioned after being allegedly raped, with the accused being acquitted at crown court. That same year, she had been identified as one of the top five backbench MPs receiving abusive and toxic tweets, according to a BBC investigation. Nichols has spoken publicly about the threats of violence and abusive messages she has received.

Parliament of the United Kingdom
Preceded by Helen Jones	Member of Parliament for Warrington North; 2019–present	Incumbent
