= Hammersmith South =

Parliamentary constituency in the United Kingdom, 1918–1955

- Former borough constituency for the House of Commons
- County: County of London

1918–1955
- Seats: One
- Created from: Hammersmith
- Replaced by: Barons Court

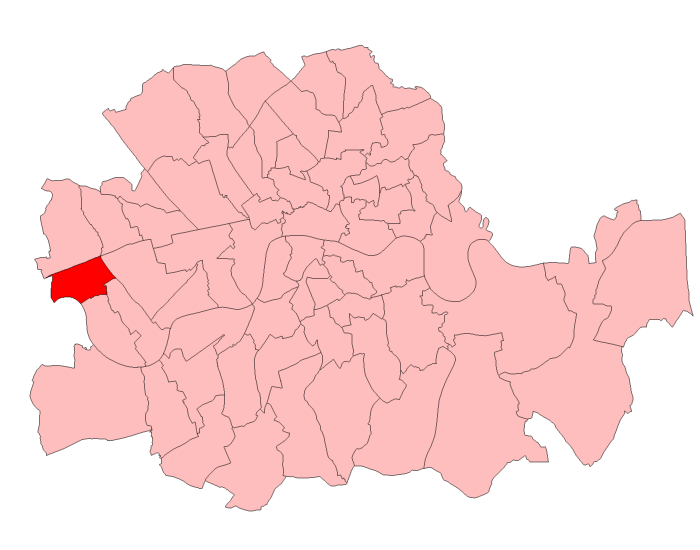
Hammersmith South in the Parliamentary County of London 1918-50

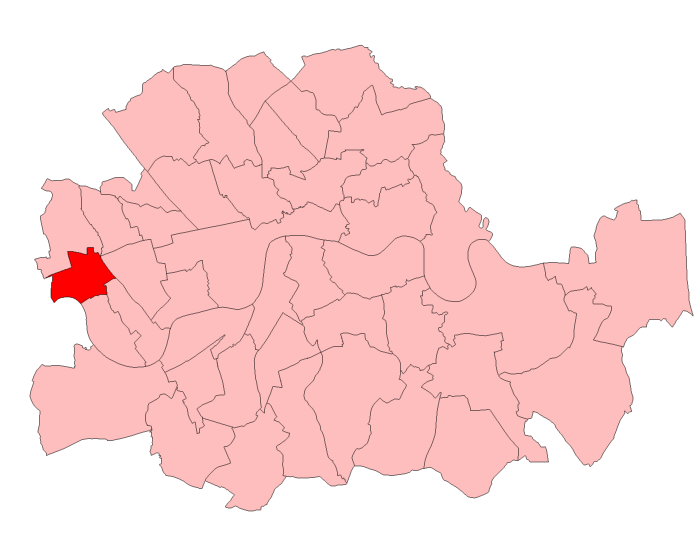
Hammersmith South in the Parliamentary County of London 1950-55

A map showing the wards of Hammersmith Metropolitan Borough as they appeared in 1916.

Hammersmith South was a borough constituency in the Metropolitan Borough of Hammersmith in west London. It returned one Member of Parliament (MP) to the House of Commons of the Parliament of the United Kingdom, elected by the first-past-the-post system.

The constituency was created when the Hammersmith constituency was divided for the 1918 general election. It was abolished for the 1955 general election.

== Boundaries ==
1918–1950: The Metropolitan Borough of Hammersmith wards numbers one, two and three.

1950–1955: The Metropolitan Borough of Hammersmith wards of Addison, Broadway, Brook Green, Grove, Olympia, Ravenscourt, and St Stephen's.

== Members of Parliament ==
Election	Member	Party
1918	William Bull	Conservative
1929	Daniel Chater	Labour
1931	James Cooke	Conservative
1945	William Adams	Labour
1949 by-election	Thomas Williams	Labour
1955	constituency abolished: see Barons Court	

== Election results ==
=== Elections in the 1910s ===
General election 1918: Hammersmith South
Party		Candidate	Votes	%	±%
C	Unionist	William Bull	8,592	65.6	
	Liberal	Thomas Atholl Robertson	2,555	19.5	
	Labour	John Thomas Westcott	1,958	14.9	
Majority			6,037	46.1	
Turnout			13,105	46.8	
Registered electors			27,996		
	Unionist win (new seat)				
C indicates candidate endorsed by the coalition government.

=== Elections in the 1920s ===
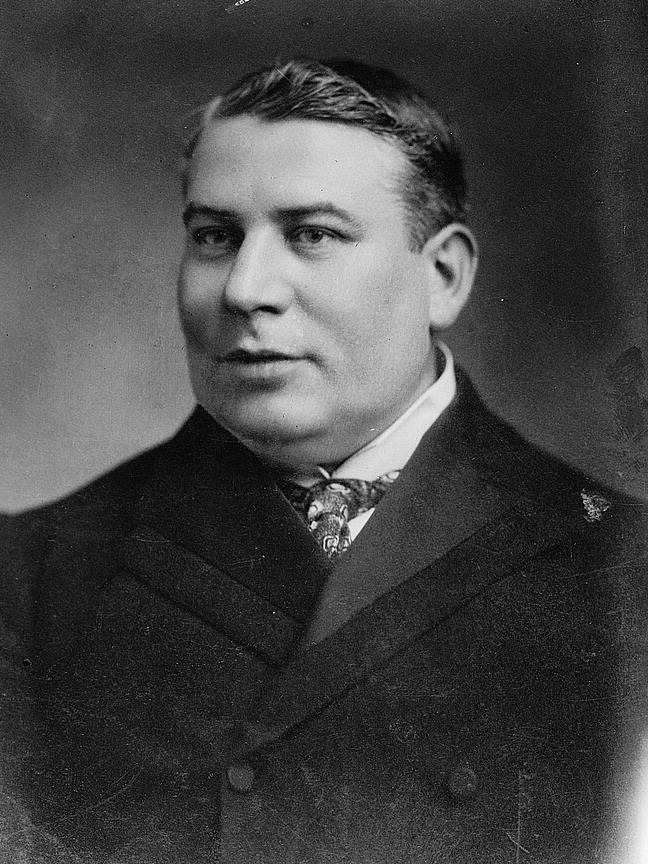
William Bull

General election 1922: Hammersmith South
Party	Candidate	Votes	%	±%
Unionist	William Bull	10,877	63.0	−2.6
Labour	Wyndham Albery	6,397	37.0	+22.1
Majority		4,480	26.0	−20.1
Turnout		17,274	56.4	+9.6
Registered electors		30,618		
Unionist hold		Swing	−12.4	

General election 1923: Hammersmith South
Party	Candidate	Votes	%	±%
Unionist	William Bull	8,184	43.4	−19.6
Labour	Wyndham Albery	6,974	36.9	−0.1
Liberal	Ernest Devan Wetton	3,723	19.7	New
Majority		1,210	6.5	−19.5
Turnout		18,881	61.1	+4.7
Registered electors		30,879		
Unionist hold		Swing	−9.8	

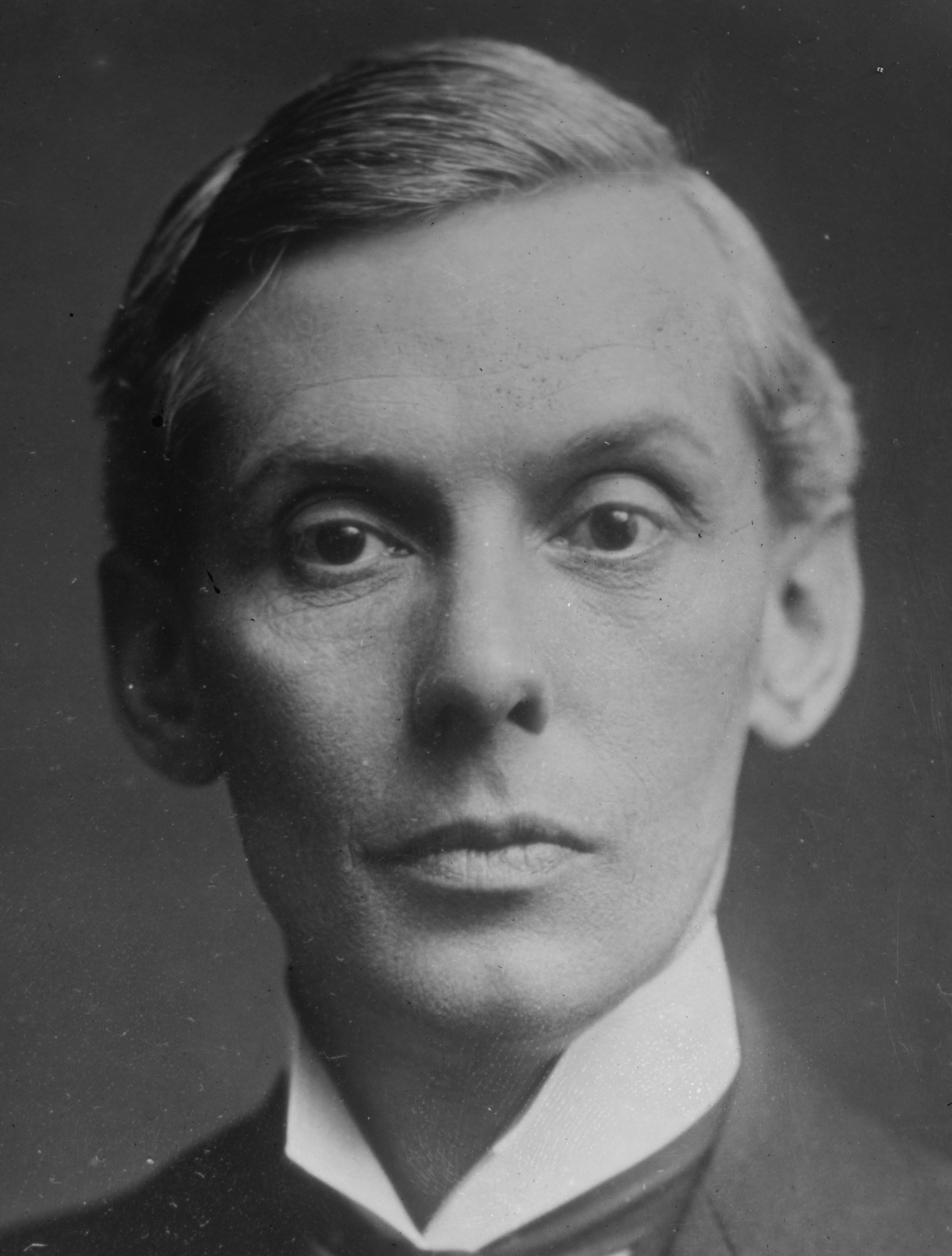
Christopher Addison

General election 1924: Hammersmith South
Party	Candidate	Votes	%	±%
Unionist	William Bull	12,679	55.4	+12.0
Labour	Christopher Addison	8,804	38.5	+1.6
Liberal	Ernest Devan Wetton	1,393	6.1	−13.6
Majority		3,875	16.9	+10.4
Turnout		22,876	72.3	+11.2
Registered electors		31,633		
Unionist hold		Swing	+5.2	

General election 1929: Hammersmith South
Party	Candidate	Votes	%	±%
Labour Co-op	Daniel Chater	12,630	43.8	+5.3
Unionist	John Ferguson	12,218	42.4	−13.0
Liberal	J J Davies	3,976	13.8	+7.7
Majority		412	1.4	N/A
Turnout		28,824	67.3	−5.0
Registered electors		42,841		
Labour Co-op gain from Unionist		Swing	+9.2	

=== Elections in the 1930s ===
General election 1931: Hammersmith South
Party	Candidate	Votes	%	±%
Conservative	Douglas Cooke	21,018	71.5	+29.1
Labour Co-op	Daniel Chater	8,390	28.5	−15.3
Majority		12,628	43.0	N/A
Turnout		29,408	68.0	+0.7
Conservative gain from Labour Co-op		Swing	+20.8	

General election 1935: Hammersmith South
Party	Candidate	Votes	%	±%
Conservative	Douglas Cooke	15,377	62.3	−9.2
Labour Co-op	William Adams	9,309	37.7	+9.2
Majority		6,068	24.6	−18.4
Turnout		24,686	60.1	−7.9
Conservative hold		Swing		

=== Elections in the 1940s ===
General election 1945: Hammersmith South
Party	Candidate	Votes	%	±%
Labour Co-op	William Adams	12,502	58.0	+20.3
Conservative	Douglas Cooke	9,044	42.0	−20.3
Majority		3,458	16.0	N/A
Turnout		21,546	65.9	+5.8
Labour Co-op gain from Conservative		Swing		

1949 Hammersmith South by-election
Party	Candidate	Votes	%	±%
Labour Co-op	Thomas Williams	15,223	52.8	−5.2
Conservative	Anthony Fell	13,610	47.2	+5.2
Majority		1,613	5.6	−10.4
Turnout		28,833	60.6	−5.3
Labour Co-op hold		Swing		

=== Elections in the 1950s ===
General election 1950: Hammersmith South
Party	Candidate	Votes	%	±%
Labour Co-op	Thomas Williams	18,825	51.8	+1.8
Conservative	Anthony Fell	16,161	44.4	+2.4
Liberal	John Stanton Ritter	1,400	3.8	New
Majority		2,664	7.4	−8.6
Turnout		36,386		
Labour Co-op hold		Swing		

General election 1951: Hammersmith South
Party	Candidate	Votes	%	±%
Labour Co-op	Thomas Williams	19,273	54.6	+2.8
Conservative	Robert N E Hinton	16,038	45.4	+1.0
Majority		3,235	9.2	+1.8
Turnout		35,311	80.2	
Labour Co-op hold		Swing	+0.9	
