= William Thomas Adams =

British politician

William Thomas Adams (10 September 1884 – 9 January 1949) was a British Labour Co-operative politician in London who served as a Member of Parliament (MP) for the last four years of his life.

== Life ==
He was the son of John Adams, from Oxted in Surrey, and his wife Annie Mary Otway. He was educated at a London Board School, the Central Street School in Finsbury. He became a clerk, and was married in 1908 to Florence Nightingale. He was elected as a member of Hammersmith Metropolitan Borough Council in 1934, became an alderman in 1938, and was Leader of the Council from 1944 to 1945.

He was elected at the 1945 general election as the Member of Parliament (MP) for Hammersmith South, having contested the seat unsuccessfully in 1935. During his time in the Commons, he never made a Maiden Speech. He died in office four years later, aged 64.

Parliament of the United Kingdom
Preceded by James Douglas Cooke	Member of Parliament for Hammersmith South; 1945 – 1949	Succeeded by Thomas Williams
