= Ivor Richard =

British politician (1932–2018)

The Right Honourable The Lord Richard PC QC
- Official portrait, 1980

Leader of the House of Lords; Lord Keeper of the Privy Seal
- In office 2 May 1997 – 27 July 1998
- Prime Minister: Tony Blair
- Preceded by: The Viscount Cranborne
- Succeeded by: The Baroness Jay of Paddington

Leader of the Opposition in the House of Lords; Shadow Leader of the House of Lords
- In office 18 July 1992 – 2 May 1997
- Leader: John Smith; Margaret Beckett (acting); Tony Blair
- Preceded by: The Lord Cledwyn of Penrhos
- Succeeded by: The Viscount Cranborne

European Commissioner for Employment and Social Affairs
- In office 6 January 1981 – 5 January 1985
- President: Gaston Thorn
- Preceded by: Henk Vredeling
- Succeeded by: Peter Sutherland

British Ambassador to the United Nations
- In office 2 June 1974 – 21 December 1979
- Prime Minister: Harold Wilson; James Callaghan; Margaret Thatcher
- Preceded by: Donald Maitland
- Succeeded by: Anthony Parsons

Parliamentary Under-Secretary of State for the Army
- In office 13 October 1969 – 19 June 1970
- Prime Minister: Harold Wilson
- Preceded by: James Boyden
- Succeeded by: Ian Gilmour

Member of the House of Lords
- Lord Temporal
- Life peerage 14 May 1990 – 18 March 2018

Member of Parliament for Barons Court
- In office 15 October 1964 – 8 February 1974
- Preceded by: Bill Carr
- Succeeded by: Constituency abolished

Personal details
- Born: Ivor Seward Richard; 30 May 1932 Cardiff, Wales
- Died: 18 March 2018 (aged 85) Lambeth, London, England
- Party: Labour
- Spouses: Geraldine Moore (m. 1956, divorced) Alison Imrie (m. 1962; div. 1983) Janet Jones (m. 1989)
- Children: 4
- Education: St Michael's School, Llanelli; Cheltenham College
- Alma mater: Pembroke College, Oxford

Ivor Seward Richard, Baron Richard, PC, QC (30 May 1932 – 18 March 2018) was a British Labour politician who served as a member of Parliament (MP) from 1964 until 1974. He was also a member of the European Commission and latterly sat as a life peer in the House of Lords.

== Education ==
Born in Cardiff, Wales, Ivor Richard was educated at St. Michael's School, an independent school in Llanelli, Carmarthenshire, followed by Cheltenham College, an independent school in Cheltenham, Gloucestershire, and Pembroke College at the University of Oxford.

== Political career ==
=== 1959–1974 ===
Lord Richard had been an active member of the Labour Party and the Fabian Society since University and stood for Parliament in Kensington South in the general election of 1959. This was one of the most prosperous constituencies in the whole country, and he came third, but it was intended as no more than an opportunity to try his campaigning skills. For the 1964 election, Richard was adopted as candidate for Baron's Court, a highly marginal constituency between Hammersmith and Fulham. Baron's Court had seen knife-edge contests before, and the presence of the BBC television centre nearby ensured good media coverage.

Richard won the seat by just over 1,000 votes. In Parliament he served briefly as an assistant to Denis Healey as Secretary of State for Defence and was appointed as Minister for the Army in 1969. He was lucky to keep his seat despite the swing to the Conservatives in the 1970 election, and he became an opposition spokesman on telecommunications. He lost this job when he voted in favour of joining the European Communities (Common Market) in 1971, but was swiftly reappointed as a Foreign Affairs spokesman.

However, the Baron's Court seat was too small to survive the redistribution that took effect in 1974. Richard found it difficult to find a new seat, as pro-Europeanism was not popular within the Labour Party. He was eventually chosen at the last minute to fight Blyth against the sitting Labour MP who had been deselected in a row over his allegations of the corruption of the local Labour Party. With no background in the area and a popular opponent, Richard was defeated convincingly.

=== 1974–1985 ===
The incoming Labour Government appointed him in June 1974 as the UK Permanent Representative to the UN, where he served for five years. Richard played a role in trying to bring together the sides in the Middle East and Rhodesia conflicts. He became a figure of controversy after the then US Ambassador, Daniel Patrick Moynihan, criticised the UN for passing a resolution stating that Zionism was a form of racism, and Richard denounced him for behaving "like the Wyatt Earp of international politics."

Richard presided as chairman over the Geneva Conference on Rhodesia from 28 October to 14 December 1976. The conference was called to implement the terms of Henry Kissinger's agreement with Prime Minister Ian Smith of Rhodesia from the previous month on the creation of an interim government to preside. At the same time, a new majority-rule constitution was written. But the various African nationalists from Rhodesia refused to recognise the agreement and no progress was made during the six weeks of the conference. Smith was scathing in his treatment of Richard in his memoirs, citing Richard's "lack of integrity and courage" in failing to hold to the terms of the Kissinger agreement.

The incoming Conservative government in 1979 replaced Richard within months. However, in 1980 he was chosen by the Labour Party to take one of the posts on the European Commission (replacing Roy Jenkins). It was known that he was the Labour Party's third choice for the position: former Treasury Minister Joel Barnett had rejected an invitation, and the Conservative government had vetoed former Defence Secretary Fred Mulley. Richard took responsibility for Employment, Social Policy, Education and Training.

=== After 1985 ===
Richard returned to Wales in 1985 and was appointed Chairman of World Trade Centre Wales Ltd., which tried to attract international investors for Welsh business. He unsuccessfully sought the Labour nomination for Cardiff West losing to Rhodri Morgan. In 1990, his name was included on a list of Labour Party 'Working Peers', and was created a life peer on 14 May 1990 taking the title Baron Richard, of Ammanford in the County of Dyfed and became an opposition spokesman in the House of Lords. His barrister's style led to his appointment as Leader of the Labour Peers from 1992, which brought with it appointment to the Privy Council. Richard led Labour in the Lords during their final spell in their near 20-year opposition before the landslide victory in 1997. Richard attempted to step up the Labour attack and in late 1993 pioneered an unprecedented (for the House of Lords) Motion of No Confidence in the Government, although he acknowledged it was a symbolic gesture and would not bring down the government, due to the primacy of the House of Commons.

When Labour won the 1997 election, Richard became Lord Privy Seal and Leader of the House of Lords. With Labour policy favouring a reform of the House starting with removing the hereditary peers, Richard began work on the new composition of the House but was shocked when he was suddenly removed at the first reshuffle in July 1998 to be replaced by Baroness Jay of Paddington. His thoughts on the reform of the House were published in Unfinished Business in 1999, and Richard became a critical friend of the Government.

Lord Richard latterly served as chairman of the parliamentary Joint Committee on the Draft House of Lords Reform Bill.

== Death ==
Lord Richard died in Lambeth, London, in March 2018 at the age of 85.

== Richard Commission ==
The Coalition Government in the National Assembly for Wales invited Richard to chair a commission on the future powers of the Assembly from 2002. The report was published on 31 March 2004 and recommended that the Assembly have full primary legislative powers in devolved areas from 2011, a recommendation that was controversial with Wales' Labour MPs.

Parliament of the United Kingdom
Preceded by Bill Carr	Member of Parliament for Barons Court; 1964–1974	Constituency abolished
Political offices
Preceded by Roy Jenkins	British European Commissioner; 1981–1985; Served alongside: Christopher Tugendhat	Succeeded by Stanley Clinton-Davis
Preceded by Christopher Tugendhat	British European Commissioner; 1981–1985; Served alongside: Christopher Tugendhat	Succeeded by The Lord Cockfield
Preceded by Henk Vredeling	European Commissioner for Employment and Social Affairs; 1981–1985	Succeeded by Peter Sutherland
Preceded by The Lord Cledwyn of Penrhos	Leader of the Opposition in the House of Lords; 1992–1997	Succeeded by The Viscount Cranborne
Preceded by The Viscount Cranborne	Leader of the House of Lords; 1997–1998	Succeeded by The Baroness Jay of Paddington
Preceded by The Viscount Cranborne	Lord Privy Seal; 1997–1998	Succeeded by The Baroness Jay of Paddington
Party political offices
Preceded by The Lord Cledwyn of Penrhos	Leader of the Labour Party in the House of Lords; 1992–1998	Succeeded by The Baroness Jay of Paddington
Diplomatic posts
Preceded by Donald Maitland	British Ambassador to the United Nations; 1974–1979	Succeeded by Anthony Parsons
