= Helen Jones =

British Labour politician (born 1954)

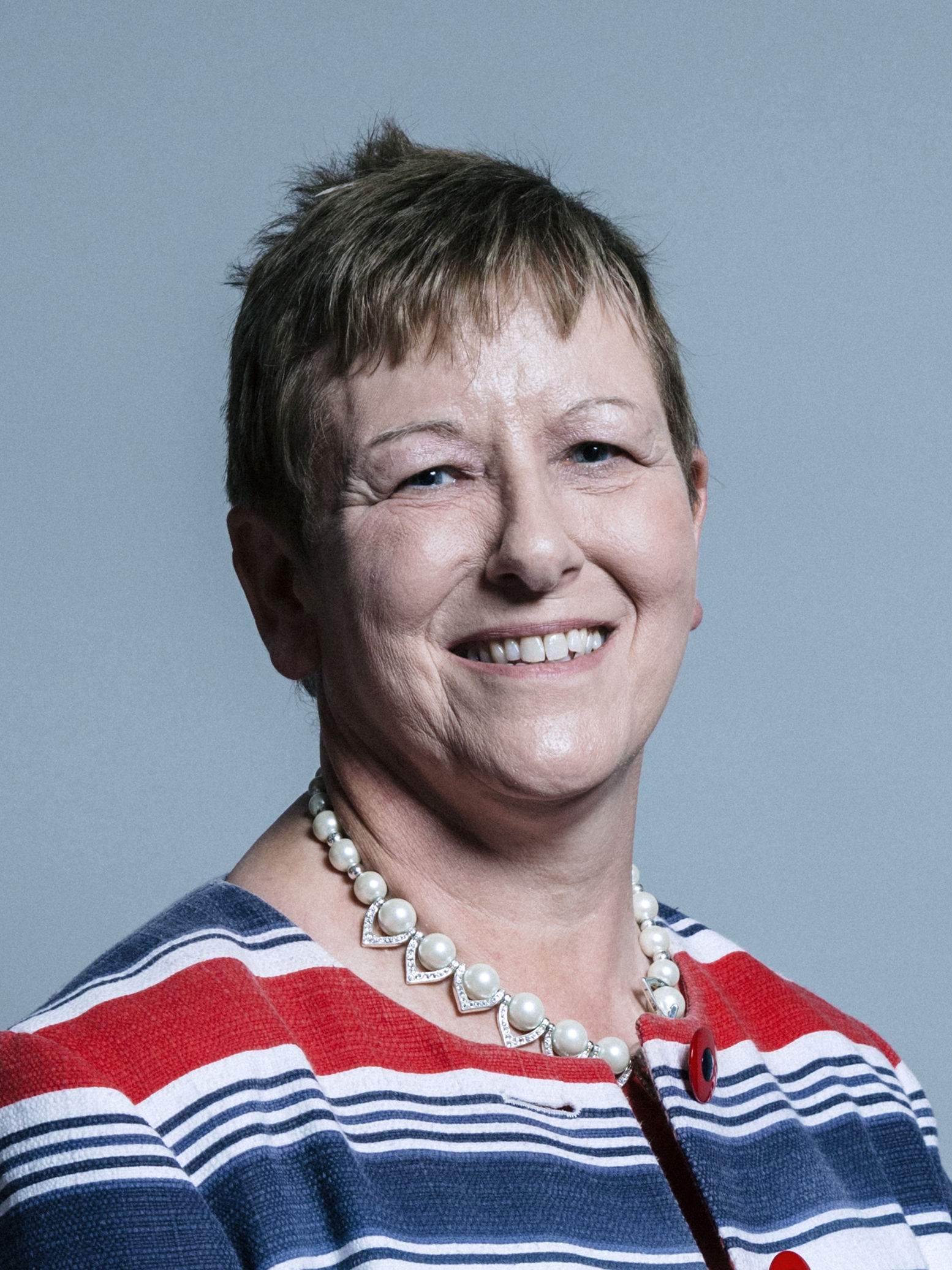
- Official portrait, 2017

Chairman of the Petitions Committee
- In office 17 June 2015 – 5 November 2019
- Prime Minister: David Cameron; Theresa May; Boris Johnson
- Preceded by: Committee Established
- Succeeded by: Catherine McKinnell

Vice-Chamberlain of the Household
- In office 9 June 2009 – 11 May 2010
- Prime Minister: Gordon Brown
- Preceded by: Claire Ward
- Succeeded by: Mark Francois

Member of Parliament for Warrington North
- In office 1 May 1997 – 6 November 2019
- Preceded by: Doug Hoyle
- Succeeded by: Charlotte Nichols

Personal details
- Born: 24 December 1954 (age 71) Chester, Cheshire, England
- Party: Labour
- Spouse: Michael Vobe
- Education: University College London, University of Liverpool
- Profession: Politician

Helen Mary Jones (born 24 December 1954) is a British Labour politician who was the Member of Parliament (MP) for Warrington North from 1997 to 2019.

Jones has served as Shadow Minister for Communities and Local Government and Shadow Home Office Minister.

== Early life ==
Jones was born and brought up in Chester, the daughter of Robert Edward Jones and Mary Scanlan.

She was educated at St Werburgh's Primary School and Ursuline Convent in Chester. She graduated with a BA from University College London and a MEd from the University of Liverpool and holds qualifications from the former Chester College and Manchester Metropolitan University.

Jones has been employed as an English teacher, a solicitor, a development officer with the mental health charity MIND and a justice and peace officer with the Roman Catholic Archdiocese of Liverpool.

She served on Chester City Council from 1984 to 1991. She was unsuccessful in contesting the Lancashire Central constituency at the 1984 European Parliament election and North Shropshire and Ellesmere Port and Neston at the 1983 and 1987 general elections respectively.

== Parliamentary career ==
In 1997, Jones was selected as the Labour Party candidate for the 'safe' Labour seat of Warrington North and won the seat with 62.1% of the vote in the general election that year.

Jones served as a member of the House of Commons select committees on Catering (1997–98), Public Administration (1998–2000) and Education and Employment (1999–2001 and 2003–). She also served on the Standing Orders Committee (1999–) and the Unopposed Bills (Panel) (1999–). She was a member of Labour Party backbench committees on Home Affairs (2002–), Education and Employment (1997–2001), Health (1997–2001) and International Development (1997–2001). She served on the all-party groups on Child Abduction (1999–2002) and CAFOD (2003–).

In 2007, Andrew Roth, writing for The Guardian, described her as an: "intelligent, battle hardened leftwing solicitor built into the Labour machine". From June 2007 to October 2008, she served as Parliamentary Private Secretary to Dawn Primarolo MP, Minister of State for Health. In the cabinet reshuffle of October 2008, Jones was promoted to a junior Government role in the position of Assistant Government Whip and was Vice-Chamberlain of the Household from 2009 to 2010. In Opposition in the next Parliament, she became Shadow Minister for Communities and Local Government and was subsequently appointed Shadow Home Office Minister by Ed Miliband in an October 2013 reshuffle.

She stepped down from the frontbench in July 2014, stating a desire to focus on community matters and speak freely on matters such as fracking and HS2 In June 2015, she was elected to the chairmanship of the Business, Innovation and Skills Select Committee and the chairmanship of the Petitions Select Committee.

She supported Owen Smith in the failed attempt to replace Jeremy Corbyn in the 2016 Labour leadership election. She is a member of Labour Friends of Israel. Her book, "How to be a Government Whip", about her time in the Whip's Office, was published by Biteback Publishing in 2016.

On 30 October 2019, shortly after the passage of a bill for an early general election, she announced she would not be running in the coming election, after 22 years spent representing the Warrington North Constituency.

=== Constituency issues ===
In November 2003, Jones accused her local ambulance service of being a "shambles" and criticised delays in answering 999 calls.

In early 2007, Jones criticised Scottish Power Manweb for continuing to send bills to a deceased relative's home. She said in the Commons that "Scottish Power Manweb's policy is a blatant attempt to obtain money for electricity which has not been used."

Jones has engaged in a fierce war of words with Warrington Borough Council on numerous occasions, notably in 2007 when she obtained emails that revealed the council's Chief Executive had explored the possibility of legal action against her following an Adjournment Debate in the Commons (where Jones had accused the council of failing to answer her letters on concerns raised by Warrington North constituents). Jones condemned the council's threat as a "waste of time and money", reminding them that any comments made in the House enjoy legal protection. She claimed that the council's threat to sue her for defamation "raised questions about the competence" of council officers. Jones responded to the threat in the Liverpool Daily Post by stating: "Maybe they think it will shut me up – but it won't. I will continue to speak up for my constituents."

In 2007, Jones also made local headlines when she posed with a cardboard cut out of the council's Chief Executive in protest at her alleged failure to tackle important community issues, including anti-social behaviour in the Orford area. She accused the council of "showing disrespect" to people in the north of the town and told the Warrington Guardian at the time that: "Our Chief Executive appears to have gone missing."

In April 2016, a councillor called for dramatic improvements to the 'poisonous' relationship between Jones and Labour party councillors.

In May and June 2019, Jones attracted criticism from local councillors who had resigned from the Labour Party.

== Personal life ==
Jones employed her husband as her parliamentary assistant.

Parliament of the United Kingdom
Preceded by Doug Hoyle	Member of Parliament for Warrington North; 1997–2019	Succeeded by Charlotte Nichols
Political offices
Preceded by Claire Ward	Vice-Chamberlain of the Household; 2009–2010	Succeeded by Mark Francois
