= St Michael's School, Llanelli =

St Michael's School
- Ysgol Mihangel Sant
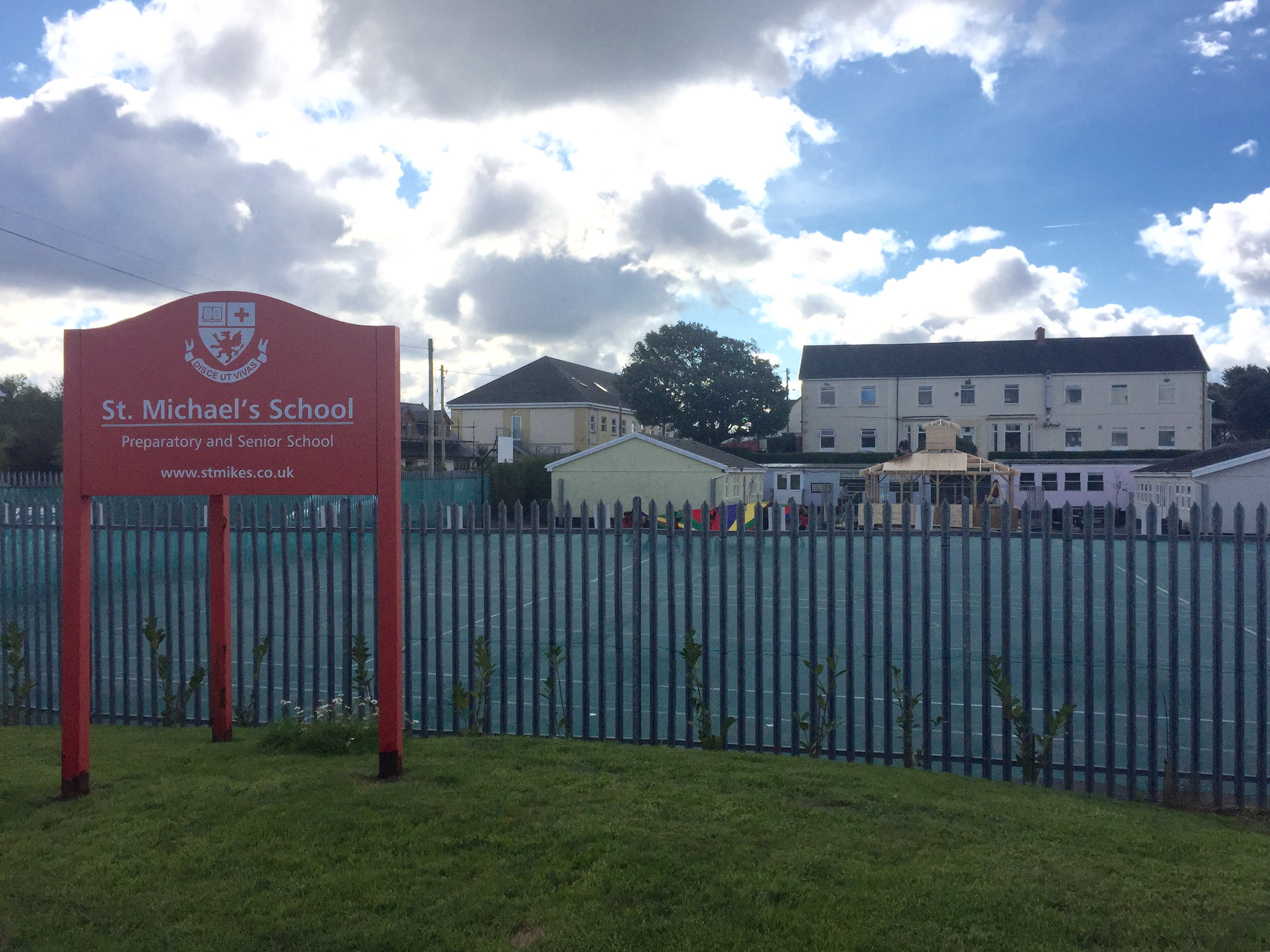

Location
- Bryn; Llanelli, Carmarthenshire, SA14 9TU; Wales
- Coordinates: 51°41′06″N 4°06′31″W

Information
- Other name: St Mikes
- Type: Private day and boarding
- Motto: Disce ut vivas (Learn, that you may live)
- Established: 1923
- Founder: Percy Rees
- Local authority: Carmarthenshire
- Headmaster: Benson Ferrari
- Gender: Mixed
- Age: 3 to 18
- Enrolment: 450
- Campus size: 13.73 acres
- Houses: Merlin, Caradog
- Colours: Red & Green
- Accreditation: ISA, BSA & BAISIS
- Website: http://www.stmikes.co.uk

St. Michael's School (Welsh: Ysgol Mihangel Sant) is a private day and boarding school for pupils aged from 3 to 18 years old in Llanelli, Wales.

The school is divided into four sections, comprising the Pre-Preparatory School, Preparatory School, Senior School and Sixth Form. The current head teacher is Benson Ferrari.

== History ==
The school was founded in 1923 by brothers Bill and Percy Rees and has been situated in the east Llanelli village of Bryn since 1928. Upon retirement of the Rees' brothers, former head boy Mr Vaughan-Evans was appointed Headmaster in 1962.

The school's main building, St. David's House, dates back to the 19th century and was originally a large house belonging to a local industrialist. The school's Pre-Preparatory School is housed in a converted former public house, The Royal Oak, which was purchased by the school in 2012

== Ownership ==
The school was acquired in 2019 by Chinese company Bright Scholar, as part of a £150m purchase of colleges in the UK. Bright Scholar is also the largest operator of international and bilingual schools in China. The deal for St Michael's, along with Bosworth Independent College, specifically cost the company a sum of £38m.

== Results ==
The school offers GCSE and A-Level qualifications, with 60.9% of all A-Level entries graded A* or A in 2018, winning the Sunday Times 2018 Welsh Independent Secondary School of the Year award. In 2020, the school won the Sunday Times 2021 Welsh Independent Secondary School of the Decade award.

== Incidents ==
In 2012 the school appeared in national headlines after accusations arose that education officers at Cognita UK, a rival education company, had posed as parents at St Michael's in order to obtain commercial information. Cognita at the time operated nearby Ffynone House School in Swansea but denied all of the allegations.

== Notable former pupils ==
Notable former pupils of St Michaels' include:

- Robert Buckland MP, politician, former Lord Chancellor
- Cerys Matthews, singer
- Kirsty Williams AM, politician, Minister for Education and Skills for Wales
- Ivor Richard, politician and diplomat, British Ambassador to the United Nations
- John Geoffrey Jones, British judge
- Siân Gwenllian AM, politician
- Non Evans MBE, Welsh international rugby player also represented Wales in judo and weightlifting at the Commonwealth games.

St Michael's alumna and singer Cerys Matthews has acknowledged in interviews that her career benefited from attending St. Michael's, because "through the public school system, you've had so many leg ups", and avoids playing music by privately educated acts on her 6 Music show. She is subsequently an advocate for state educated acts in the music industry.
