= John Geoffrey Jones =

British judge (1928–2014)

His Honour Judge John Geoffrey Jones Hon.LL.D.
- Jones in 1975
- Born: John Geoffrey Ramon Owen Jones; 14 September 1928; Burry Port, Wales
- Died: 14 June 2014 (aged 85); Leicester, England
- Citizenship: United Kingdom
- Education: St Michael's School, Llanelli
- Alma mater: St David's College, Lampeter; University College London
- Occupations: Judge; barrister
- Spouse: Sheila Gregory (m. 1954; died 2014)
- Children: 3
- Relatives: Mervyn Johns (uncle); Glynis Johns (cousin)

His Honour Judge John Geoffrey Ramon Owen Jones (14 September 1928 – 14 June 2014) was a British judge.

== Early life and education ==
Jones was born in Burry Port, Carmarthenshire, on 14 September 1928. He was the eldest of three sons of Wyndham Christopher Jones, the director of an electrical firm, and Lilias Rosalind Christina Johns. Through his mother, Jones was a nephew of the actor Mervyn Johns and a cousin of actress Glynis Johns.

Jones was first educated at St Michael's School, a private boarding school in Llanelli where he was head boy. He read law at St David's College, Lampeter and University College London, gaining an LL.B. in 1955 and LL.M in 1985.

== Career ==
Jones was called to the Bar at Gray's Inn in 1956. From 1956 to 1967, he was a pupil of His Honour Richard Geraint Rees and the Right Honourable Sir John Dexter Stocker.

Jones practised law in Leicester from 1958 to 1970 and in London from 1970 to 1975. On 14 January 1975, he was sworn in by the Lord Chancellor as a circuit judge, assigned to the Midland and Oxford circuit and sitting at the Central Criminal Court. As a Deputy High Court Judge, Jones presided over the county courts of Leicester, Lincoln and Nottingham. It was said that under "His Honour Judge Jones, [the court] actively encourages the co-operation of solicitors." He was a member of the Bar Council from 1970 to 1972.

From 1985 to 2000, Jones was president of the Mental Health Review Tribunal for the West Midlands. He was chairman of the Mental Health Review Tribunal for Wales from 1996 to 1999 and president from 1999 to 2000.

== Views ==
Jones' views on child psychopathy – as it relates to criminal deeds – were not to distinguish them from similar deeds committed by adults. Barring those aged 10 or younger (whom Jones said are "irrebuttably presumed not to be capable of criminal intent") and between 10 and 14 years old (where "there is only a rebuttable presumption that they are not so capable"), he believed that children are innocent only through a lack of comprehension of the wickedness of their deeds. To Jones, this was an insight into the psychopathy of adults: "An adult who does evil acts is either one who is still a child and cannot understand the evil nature of his acts, an adult who has become disinhibited, or one who has never become inhibited."

My own present, unresolved thoughts are that 'evil' is within the realm of theologians and moral philosophers. Doctors, judges and lawyers would do well to concern themselves with bad deeds and bad health, that is deeds, which society has determined as criminal. If the perpetrators of bad deeds are not sick, they should be punished according to law. If they are sick, they should be treated.

— John Geoffrey Jones
Herschel Prins' Psychopaths: An Introduction

Jones' diagnoses relied on the social contract theory, which he called "an aspect of the instinct for self-preservation." He believed all humans to be innately self-centred, inflicting their wills on the Universe as an "inner compulsion." Without the tacit arrangement of a social contract, humans would be uninhibited; with it, they recognise the mutual benefits of society and are inhibited by virtue.

Jones saw the committer of bad deeds as the impervious person: that "rare person whose intuition is stunted and who misses out on instruction grows up uninhibited, so continues bad deeds." A disinhibited person who once had inhibitions will also commit bad deeds; Jones resolved that they too are in need of treatment. Those who aren't in need of treatment, and guilty, are those who exercise their free will and become disinhibited by conviction. Jones charged the psychiatrist, rather than the court, with diagnosing mental health.

Jones believed strongly in fair sentencing for criminals without mental health problems. In the case of the mentally ill, he believed the welfare system was inept.

== Personal life ==
On 17 July 1954, Jones married Sheila Gregory in Kensington, London. They had three sons.

He died on 14 June 2014 in Leicester, England.

== Honours ==
=== Scholastic ===
==== University degrees ====
Location	Date	School	Degree
England	1955	University College London	Bachelor of Laws (LL.B.)
England	1985	University College London	Master of Laws (LL.M.)

==== Honorary degrees ====
Location	Date	School	Degree
England	1996	De Montfort University	Legum Doctor (LL.D.)

==== Honorary fellowships ====
Location	Date	School	Notes
England	1989	Leicester Polytechnic	Honorary Senior Academic Fellow
