= 1961 Warrington by-election =

UK Parliamentary by-election

The 1961 Warrington by-election was held on 20 April 1961 when the incumbent Labour MP, Dr Edith Summerskill became a Life Peer. The seat was retained by the Labour candidate Thomas Williams.

== Candidates ==
The local Liberals selected 39 year old insurance official Frank Tetlow. He was born in September 1921 and educated at King's School, Macclesfield. He was a member of the Liberal Party Council. He had been elected to Cheshire County Council and Bredbury and Romiley Urban District Council. At the 1959 general election he had been Liberal candidate for Knutsford.

== Result ==
Warrington by-election, 1961
| Party | Candidate | Votes | % | ±% |
|---|---|---|---|---|
| Labour | Thomas Williams | 16,149 | 55.84 | −0.46 |
| Conservative | Beata Brookes | 9,149 | 32.08 | −11.62 |
| Liberal | Frank R Tetlow | 3,623 | 12.53 | +12.53 |
| Majority | | 7,000 | 23.76 | +11.26 |
| Turnout | | 28,921 | 56.7 | −20.2 |
| Labour hold | | Swing | -0.6 | |
