= Warrington North =

UK Parliament constituency (since 1983)

Coordinates: 53°24′N 2°34′W

- County constituency for the House of Commons
- Interactive map of boundaries since 2024
- Location within North West England
- County: Cheshire
- Electorate: 72,350 (March 2020)
- Major settlements: Birchwood, Glazebrook, Padgate

Current constituency
- Created: 1983
- Member of Parliament: Charlotte Nichols (Labour)
- Seats: One
- Created from: Warrington, Newton

Warrington North is a parliamentary constituency represented in the House of Commons of the Parliament of the United Kingdom since 2019 by Charlotte Nichols of the Labour Party. It elects one Member of Parliament (MP) by the first past the post system of election.

== Constituency profile ==
Clegge Street, Warrington

Warrington North is a constituency in Cheshire (although traditionally in Lancashire) in North West England. It covers the northern and eastern suburbs of Warrington (Westbrook, Orford, Bruche, Padgate and Woolston) and the outlying towns and villages of Birchwood, Culcheth and Burtonwood.

Warrington is a large town located between Liverpool and Manchester, around 15 miles (24 km) from both cities. It is a historic market town which grew rapidly during the Industrial Revolution as a centre for steelmaking, textile manufacturing and brewing. Many of the neighbourhoods in this constituency, including the town of Birchwood, were built during the 1970s after Warrington was designated a new town. Many people were rehoused here after slum clearances in Liverpool and Manchester. This constituency has average levels of wealth overall; much of Orford and Birchwood are highly deprived whilst Woolston and the outlying villages are affluent. House prices across the constituency are generally similar to the rest of North West England but lower than the UK average.

Residents of Warrington North have a similar age profile to the country as a whole, albeit with a below-average proportion of young adults. They have average levels of income, homeownership and child poverty. Residents have below-average levels of education and a high proportion work in the retail, technology and construction sectors. The percentage of residents claiming unemployment benefits is below-average. White people made up 95% of the population at the 2021 census.

At the local borough council, almost all seats in this constituency are represented by the Labour Party. Voters in Warrington North strongly supported leaving the European Union in the 2016 referendum; an estimated 60% voted in favour of Brexit compared to the UK-wide figure of 52%.

== Creation ==
The constituency was created for the 1983 general election following the major reorganisation of local authorities under the Local Government Act 1972, which came into effect on 1 April 1974. It comprised parts of the abolished constituencies of Newton and Warrington.

== Boundaries ==
1983–1997: The Borough of Warrington wards of Bewsey, Burtonwood, Croft, Culcheth and Glazebury, Fairfield, Howley, Hulme, Longford, Orford, Poulton-with-Fearnhead North, Poulton-with-Fearnhead South, Rixton and Woolston, Whitecross, and Winwick.

Comprised the majority of the abolished Warrington constituency, together with parts of Newton, including Poulton, Winwick and Woolston.

1997–2010: The Borough of Warrington wards of Bewsey, Burtonwood, Culcheth, Glazebury and Croft, Fairfield, Hulme, Locking Stumps, Gorse Covert and Risley, Oakwood, Orford, Poplars, Poulton North, Poulton South, Rixton and Woolston, Longbarn, and Winwick.

Under the Fourth Periodic Review of constituencies, the number of constituencies in Cheshire was increased from 10 to 11 and parts of Warrington South were now included in the newly created constituency of Weaver Vale. To compensate for this loss, the town centre area was transferred from the constituency to Warrington South.

2010–present: The Borough of Warrington wards of Birchwood, Burtonwood and Winwick, Culcheth, Glazebury and Croft, Fairfield and Howley, Orford, Poplars and Hulme, Poulton North, Poulton South, Rixton and Woolston, and Westbrook.

The boundaries introduced at the 2010 general election, following the Fifth Periodic Review, resulted in only minor changes due to revision of ward boundaries.

Subject to a minor adjustment due to ward boundary changes in the Borough of Warrington, the 2023 review of Westminster constituencies, which was based on the ward structure in place at 1 December 2020, left the boundaries unchanged.

== Political history ==
Its first member of Parliament was Doug Hoyle, (Note: Hoyle was awarded a life peerage in 1997, becoming Lord Hoyle (of Warrington)) who had first won the Warrington seat in a by-election in 1981, beating Roy Jenkins, the leader of the then-new Social Democratic Party, in its first election. Hoyle stood down at the 1997 general election and was replaced by Helen Jones, who held the seat from then until the 2019 general election, when she chose to stand down. The seat was then held for Labour by Charlotte Nichols, albeit with a significantly reduced majority.

Although 2010 saw a 6.6% swing from the Labour Party to the Conservative Party, all of its majorities until 2019 were not thought marginal and therefore Warrington North was until then considered a safe seat for the Labour Party, who have selected all of the winning candidates for MP since the constituency's creation.

== Members of Parliament ==
Election	Member	Party
1983	Doug Hoyle	Labour
1997	Helen Jones	Labour
2019	Charlotte Nichols	Labour

== Elections ==
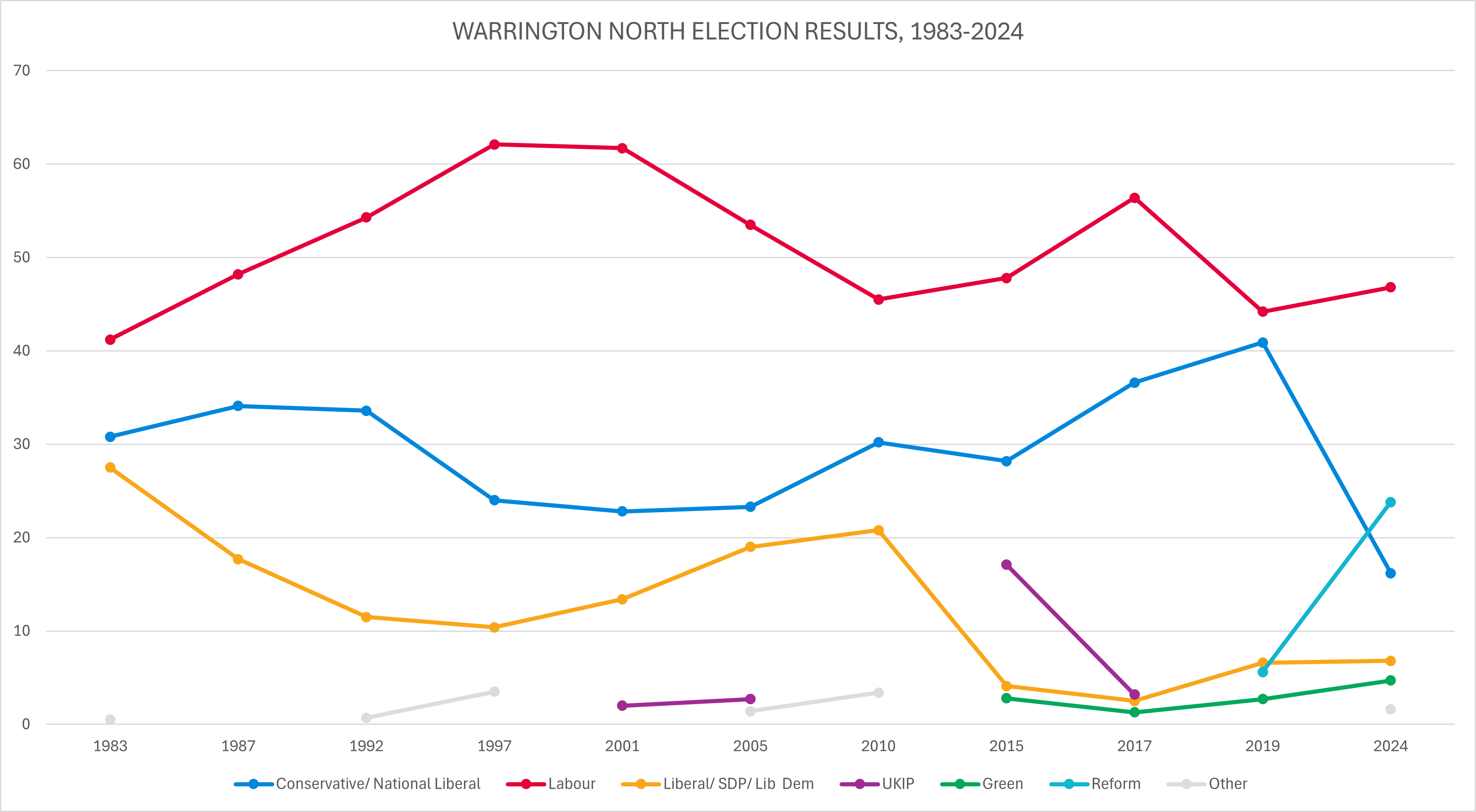
Election results 1950-2024

=== Elections in the 2020s ===
General election 2024: Warrington North
Party	Candidate	Votes	%	±%
Labour	Charlotte Nichols	18,730	46.8	+2.6
Reform	Trevor Nicholls	9,540	23.8	+18.2
Conservative	Yasmin Al-Atroshi	6,486	16.2	−24.7
Liberal Democrats	David Crowther	2,737	6.8	+0.2
Green	Hannah Spencer	1,889	4.7	+2.0
Independent	Maddison Wheeldon	659	1.6	N/A
Majority		9,190	23.0	+19.7
Turnout		40,041	57.3	−7.3
Labour hold		Swing	−7.8	

=== Elections in the 2010s ===
General election 2019: Warrington North
Party	Candidate	Votes	%	±%
Labour	Charlotte Nichols	20,611	44.2	−12.2
Conservative	Wendy Maisey	19,102	40.9	+4.3
Liberal Democrats	David Crowther	3,071	6.6	+4.1
Brexit Party	Elizabeth Babade	2,626	5.6	N/A
Green	Lyndsay McAteer	1,257	2.7	+1.4
Majority		1,509	3.3	−16.5
Turnout		46,667	64.6	−2.8
Labour hold		Swing	−10.4	

General election 2017: Warrington North
Party	Candidate	Votes	%	±%
Labour	Helen Jones	27,356	56.4	+8.6
Conservative	Val Allen	17,774	36.6	+8.4
UKIP	James Ashington	1,561	3.2	−13.9
Liberal Democrats	Stefan Krizanac	1,207	2.5	−1.6
Green	Lyndsay McAteer	619	1.3	−1.5
Majority		9,582	19.8	+0.2
Turnout		48,517	67.4	+4.9
Labour hold		Swing	+5.5	

General election 2015: Warrington North
Party	Candidate	Votes	%	±%
Labour	Helen Jones	21,720	47.8	+2.3
Conservative	Richard Short	12,797	28.2	−2.0
UKIP	Trevor Nicholls	7,757	17.1	N/A
Liberal Democrats	Stefan Krizanac	1,881	4.1	−16.7
Green	Sarah Hayes	1,264	2.8	N/A
Majority		8,923	19.6	+4.3
Turnout		45,419	62.5	+0.8
Labour hold		Swing	+4.8	

General election 2010: Warrington North
Party	Candidate	Votes	%	±%
Labour	Helen Jones	20,135	45.5	−7.3
Conservative	Paul Campbell	13,364	30.2	+5.9
Liberal Democrats	Dave Eccles	9,196	20.8	+2.1
Independent	Albert Scott	1,516	3.4	N/A
Majority		6,771	15.3	−13.2
Turnout		44,211	61.7	+6.4
Labour hold		Swing	−7.8	

=== Elections in the 2000s ===
General election 2005: Warrington North
Party	Candidate	Votes	%	±%
Labour	Helen Jones	21,632	53.5	−8.2
Conservative	Andrew Ferryman	9,428	23.3	+0.5
Liberal Democrats	Peter Walker	7,699	19.0	+5.6
UKIP	John Kirkham	1,086	2.7	+0.7
Community Action	Mike Hughes	573	1.4	N/A
Majority		12,204	30.2	−8.7
Turnout		40,418	55.1	+1.4
Labour hold		Swing	−4.3	

General election 2001: Warrington North
Party	Candidate	Votes	%	±%
Labour	Helen Jones	24,026	61.7	−0.4
Conservative	James Usher	8,870	22.8	−1.2
Liberal Democrats	Roy Smith	5,232	13.4	+3.0
UKIP	John Kirkham	782	2.0	N/A
Majority		15,156	38.9	+0.8
Turnout		38,910	53.7	−16.7
Labour hold		Swing	−4.1	

=== Elections in the 1990s ===
General election 1997: Warrington North
Party	Candidate	Votes	%	±%
Labour	Helen Jones	31,827	62.1	+7.8
Conservative	Ray Lacey	12,300	24.0	−9.6
Liberal Democrats	Ian Greenhalgh	5,308	10.4	−1.1
Referendum	Arthur Smith	1,816	3.5	N/A
Majority		19,527	38.1	+17.4
Turnout		51,251	70.4	−6.9
Labour hold		Swing	−7.0	

General election 1992: Warrington North
Party	Candidate	Votes	%	±%
Labour	Doug Hoyle	33,019	54.3	+6.1
Conservative	Colin Daniels	20,397	33.6	−0.5
Liberal Democrats	Ian Greenhalgh	6,965	11.5	−6.2
Natural Law	Brian Davis	400	0.7	N/A
Majority		12,622	20.7	+6.6
Turnout		60,781	77.3	+2.1
Labour hold		Swing	+6.6	

=== Elections in the 1980s ===
General election 1987: Warrington North
Party	Candidate	Votes	%	±%
Labour	Doug Hoyle	27,422	48.2	+7.0
Conservative	Laurence Jones	19,409	34.1	+3.3
SDP	Colin Bithell	10,046	17.7	−9.8
Majority		8,013	14.1	+3.7
Turnout		56,877	75.2	+2.6
Labour hold		Swing		

General election 1983: Warrington North
Party	Candidate	Votes	%	±%
Labour	Doug Hoyle	20,873	41.2	
Conservative	Stuart Sexton	15,596	30.8	
SDP	David Harrison	13,951	27.5	
BNP	Ian Sloan	267	0.5	
Majority		5,277	10.4	
Turnout		50,687	72.6	
Labour win (new seat)				

== See also ==
- List of parliamentary constituencies in Cheshire
- History of parliamentary constituencies and boundaries in Cheshire
