= Douglas Cooke =

English politician

Sir James Douglas Cooke, FRCS (1879 – 13 July 1949) was a Conservative politician from England. He served as the British Conservative politician for Hammersmith South In 1931, he became a member of Parliament, where he remained until 1945. He was knighted in the King's Birthday Honours list in 1945.

== Personal background ==
James Douglas Cooke was born in 1879 in Melbourne, Australia, the eldest son of John Cooke, a pastoralist who had lived in New Zealand. In 1907, Cooke married Elsie Muriel. Together, they had one son and three daughters. Elsie was the daughter of General James Burston and the sister of Major General Samuel Burston of Melbourne. Cooke lived in London until his death in 1949.

== Professional background ==
Cooke was educated at Melbourne University, where he qualified in medicine and surgery, receiving his Bachelor of Medicine in 1901, and Bachelor of Surgery a year later.

After immigrating to England, he joined the Royal College of Physicians in London in 1903, became a Member of the Royal College of Surgeons on 12 Nov 1903, and a Fellow on 1 June 1905. He served in the First World War in the Royal Army Medical Corps. He also ran a medical practice in Stanmore, Middlesex.

== Political career ==
Prior to becoming an MP he had unsuccessfully contested the Peckham division of Camberwell, at the 1929 general election. At the 1931 general election he contested Hammersmith South for the Conservatives. This was a seat the party had lost to Labour in 1929 by just over 400 votes. Cooke defeated the incumbent Dan Chater by 12,638 votes to regain the seat for his party. He retained it in 1935 with a reduced majority of 6,068, defeating local councillor W T Adams.
