= Rutherford (name) =

The surname Rutherford, also Rutherfurd, is a Scottish and Northern English habitational surname deriving from a place in the Scottish borders region near Roxburgh. It is also a given name.

== Origin ==
Rutherford is a Scottish border clan name. The name comes from a place-name in Roxburghshire on the south bank of the river Tweed, midway between Melrose and Kelso. A village there, then called Rothersfurth, was burnt and razed by an English army in 1545 and has disappeared from the map.

The origin of the Rutherford name is thought to have been the Old English "rother" meaning “cattle” and "ford", “a river crossing.”

Or according to another theory, the name can be traced back to the West Flemish name Ruddervoorde, a community now part of Oostkamp.

Another theory of the origin of the name states that a man by the name Ruther carried an ancient king of Scots over the River Tweed. Eventually, a descendant of the king gave land to the family that carried his forefather over the river and when surnames were adopted, Rutherford came into being.

== Surname ==
Notable people with the surname include:

- Adam Rutherford, British geneticist, author, and broadcaster
- Alexander Cameron Rutherford, Canadian politician, first Premier of Alberta (1905–1910)
- Ann Rutherford (1917–2012), Canadian-American actress, best known as Polly Benedict of Andy Hardy film series
- Anna Rutherford (1932–2001), Australian-born academic and publisher
- Blake Rutherford (born 1997), American baseball player
- Boyd Rutherford (born 1957), Lieutenant Governor of the U.S. state of Maryland
- Carl Rutherford (1929–2006), American Piedmont blues musician
- Clancy Rudeforth, former Australian rules footballer
- Daniel Rutherford, a Scottish chemist and physician who is most famous for the discovery of nitrogen
- Daniel Edwin Rutherford, Scottish mathematician
- Don Rutherford (1937–2016), English international rugby union player
- Ernest Rutherford, 1st Baron Rutherford of Nelson, known as the "father of nuclear physics"
- Frances Rutherford (1912–2006), New Zealand artist and occupational therapist
- Friend Smith Rutherford (1820–1864), United States Army office and lawyer
- Gilbert Rutherford, American politician
- Geo Rutherford, American artist and TikToker
- Greg Rutherford (born 1986), British athlete (specifically long jumper)
- Griffith Rutherford (1721–1805) American Revolutionary War General
- Hamish Rutherford, (born 1989) New Zealand cricketer
- Jack Rutherford (cricketer), Australian Test cricketer
- Jack Rutherford (footballer, born 1892) (1892–1930), English footballer for Brighton & Hove Albion, Bristol Rovers and Gillingham
- Jack Rutherford (footballer, born 1908), English footballer for Gillingham and Watford
- James Rutherford (disambiguation), several people
- Jason Rutherford, professional baseball coach and scout
- Jesse Rutherford (singer), actor and lead singer of the band The Neighbourhood
- Jim Rutherford, former NHL goaltender and current president of hockey operations for the Vancouver Canucks.
- Joe Rutherford, an Aston Villa F.C. goalkeeper of the mid-20th-century
- John Rutherford (disambiguation), multiple people
- Joseph Franklin Rutherford, also known as "Judge Rutherford", 2nd president of the Watch Tower Society corporation
- Kathleen Rutherford (1896–1975), Scottish-born physician, philanthropist, humanitarian aid worker and peace campaigner, practising in England.
- Kelly Rutherford, American actress, most famous for her role as Lily van der Woodsen in the CW teen drama Gossip Girl
- Ken Rutherford (cricketer), New Zealand batsman and captain
- Margaret Rutherford, British actress
- Mike Rutherford (born 1950), English musician famous for being the bassist and guitarist of the rock band Genesis
- Mildred Lewis Rutherford (1851–1928), American White suprematist
- Monica Rutherford (1944–2024), English artistic gymnast
- Rachel Rutherford, New York City Ballet soloist
- Richard Rutherford (born 1956), British classical scholar
- Rosemary Rutherford (1912–1972), English artist
- Samuel Rutherford (c. 1600–1661), Scottish theologian, minister and political theorist
- Samuel Rutherford (Georgia politician) (1870–1932), American politician, businessman, jurist and lawyer
- Samuel Wilson Rutherford (1866–1952), African American pioneer in insurance
- Sherfane Rutherford (born 1998), Guyanese and West Indies cricketer
- Skip Rutherford (born 1950), academic administrator
- Theodora Fonteneau Rutherford (1904-after 1982), American accountant, clubwoman, and college instructor
- Walter Rutherford (1857–1913), Scottish golfer (Olympic silver medallist)
- Walter Rutherford (footballer) (1891–1944), Scottish footballer with Kilmarnock, Ayr United, Johnstone
- William Rutherford (disambiguation), several people
- Zara Rutherford (born 2003), Belgian-British aviator

== Given name ==
Notable people with the given name include:

- Rutherford H. Adkins (1924–1998), World War II pilot with the Tuskegee Airmen
- Rutherford Alcock (1809–1897), British diplomatic representative
- Rutherford Aris (1929–2005), chemical engineer, control theorist, mathematician, professor
- Rutherford Boyd (1882–1951), American sculptor, painter and illustrator
- Rutherford Cravens, American actor
- Rutherford Decker (1904–1972), American politician
- Rutherford John Gettens (1900–1974), chemist and conservation scientist
- Rutherford Guthrie (1899–1990), Australian politician
- Rutherford B. Hayes (1822–1893), 19th president of the United States (1877–1881)
  - Rutherford P. Hayes (1858–1927), American librarian; son of the president
- Rutherford Irones (1877–1948), American physician and politician
- Rutherford Latham (born 1954), Spanish equestrian
- Rutherford George Montgomery (1894–1985), American writer of children's books
- Rutherford Page (1887–1912), early American aviator who died in an airplane crash
- Rutherford Platt (1894–1975), American nature writer, photographer, and advertising executive
- Rutherford "Rud" Rennie (1897–1956), newspaperman and sportswriter
- Rutherford Ness Robertson (1913–2001), Australian botanist and biologist
- Rutherford Waddell (1850–1932), New Zealand Presbyterian minister, social reformer and writer
- Rutherford Lester Whiting (1930–2014), Canadian politician

== See also ==
- Edward Rutherfurd, nom de plume of Francis Edward Wintle, author of historical fiction
