= Fonteneau =

Fonteneau is a surname. Notable people with the name include:

- Jean Fonteneau (1484–1544), Portuguese navigator, explorer and corsair
- Louis Fonteneau (1907–1989), French sports administrator
- Pascale Fonteneau (born 1963), French-born journalist and novelist in Belgium
- Theodora Fonteneau Rutherford (1904–1993), African-American accountant, clubwoman, college instructor
