= John Rutherford =

John Rutherford may refer to:

== Sports ==
- Jock Rutherford (1884–1963), English footballer
- John Rutherford (footballer) (1907–unknown), English footballer
- John Rutherford (rugby union) (born 1955), Scottish international rugby player
- John Rutherford (Australian cricketer) (1929-2022), Australian cricketer, sometimes known as Jack Rutherford
- John Rutherford (Hampshire cricketer) (1890–1943), English cricketer
- John Rutherford (Cambridge University cricketer) (1935-2013), English cricketer
- Johnny Rutherford (born 1938), retired U.S. automobile racer
- Johnny Rutherford (baseball) (1925–2016), Major League Baseball pitcher

== Others ==
- John Rutherford (physician) (1695–1779), Scottish professor father of Daniel Rutherford
- Sir John Rutherford, 1st Baronet (1854–1932), British Conservative politician, MP for Darwen 1895–1922
- Hugo Rutherford (John Hugo Rutherford, 1887–1942), British Conservative politician, MP for Edge Hill, 1931–1935
- John Rutherford (Conservative politician) (1904–1957), British Conservative politician, MP for Edmonton, 1931–1935
- John Rutherford (Florida politician) (born 1952), U.S. representative for Florida's 4th congressional district
- John D. Rutherford (born 1941), fellow at The Queen's College, Oxford, and a translator of Don Quixote
- John Gunion Rutherford (1857–1923), Canadian veterinarian, civil servant, and politician

== See also ==
- John P. Rutherfoord (born 1942), American particle physicist and professor
- John Rutherfoord (1792–1866), governor of Virginia
- John Rutherfoord (judge) (1861–1942), Virginia state legislator and judge
- John Rutherfurd (1760–1840), U.S. senator from New Jersey
- Jack Rutherford (disambiguation)
