= James Rutherford =

James Rutherford may refer to:

- James Rutherford (Arkansas politician) (1825–1914), member of the Arkansas Senate
- James Rutherford (Australian pioneer) (1827–1911), transit pioneer in Australia
- James Todd Rutherford (born 1970), American politician; state representative for South Carolina
- James Rutherford (New Zealand politician) (1825–1883), New Zealand politician
- James W. Rutherford (1925–2010), American politician; mayor of Flint, Michigan
- James Rutherford (baritone) (born 1972), British bass baritone
- James Rutherford (historian) (1906–1963), New Zealand historian at the University of Auckland
- Jim Rutherford (born 1949), Canadian ice hockey goaltender and executive
- Jim Rutherford (baseball) (1886–1956), Major League Baseball center fielder
- Jim Rutherford (footballer) (1894–1924), English football full-back
- Jim Rutherford (rugby league) (1913–1964), Australian rugby league player
- James Rankin Rutherford (1882–1967), Scottish politician
- James Rutherford (Canadian politician) (1875–1939), member of the Canadian House of Commons
- Skip Rutherford (James Luin Rutherford III, born 1950), American non-profit executive and academic administrator
- J. T. Rutherford (1921–2006), American politician from Texas
- James Rutherford (MP) (died 1747), Scottish politician

== See also ==
- F. James Rutherford (1924–2021), American scientist
