= Evan Durbin =

British economist and politician (1906–1948)

Evan Durbin MP
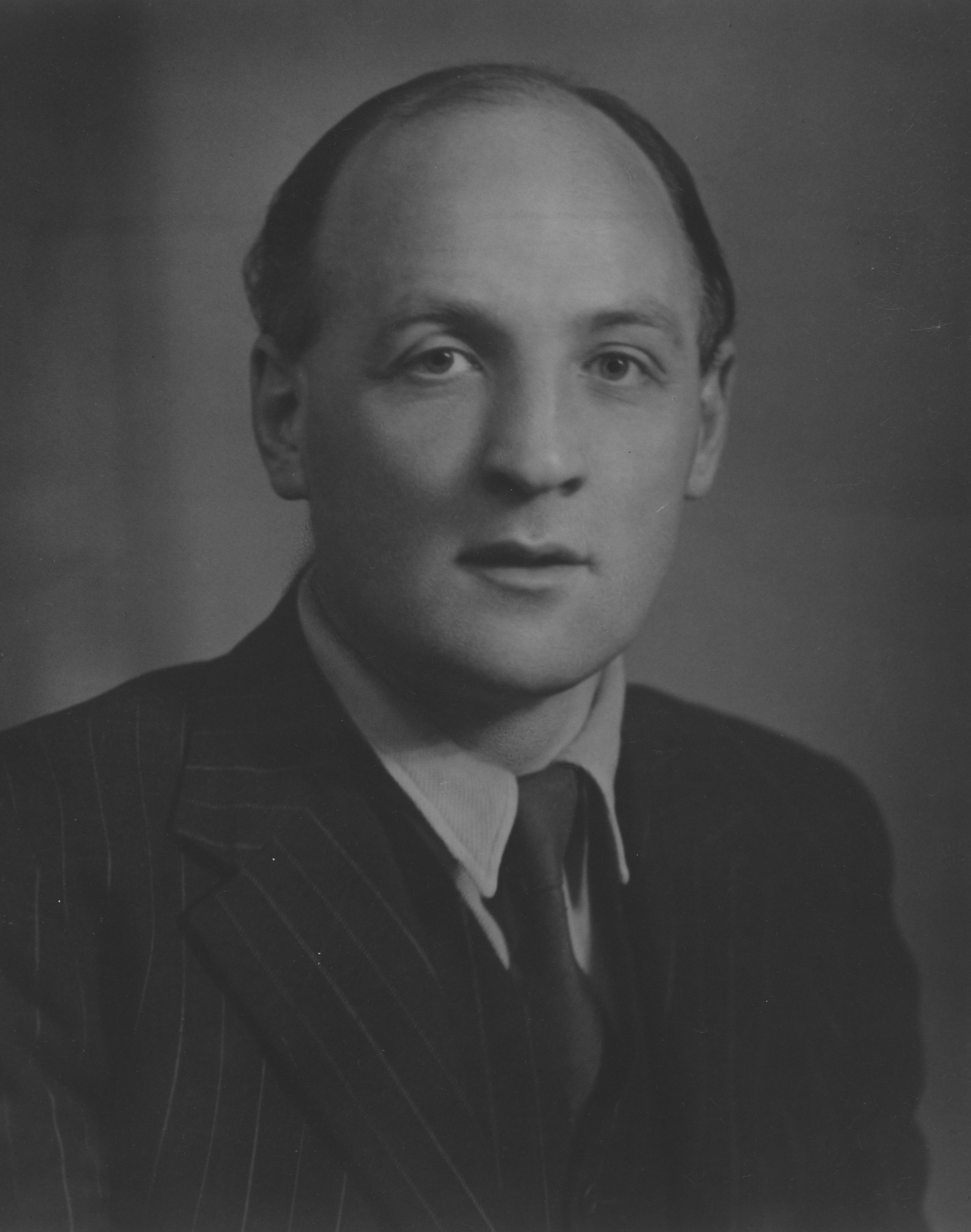
- Durbin, c. 1930s
- Born: 1 March 1906; Bideford
- Died: 3 September 1948 (aged 42); Crackington Haven

Academic background
- Education: New College, Oxford; Taunton School; Hele's School, Exeter
- Influences: Lionel Robbins; Reginald Bassett; G. D. H. Cole; R. H. Tawney; James Meade; John Bowlby; Solly Zuckerman

Academic work
- Discipline: Macroeconomics
- School or tradition: Market socialism
- Institutions: London School of Economics

Evan Frank Mottram Durbin (1 March 1906 – 3 September 1948) was a British economist and Labour Party politician, whose writings combined a belief in central economic planning with a conviction that the price mechanism of markets was indispensable.

Durbin was an influential thinker on economic policy within the Labour Party. Historian David Kynaston described Durbin as "the Labour Party's most interesting thinker of the 1940s and arguably of the twentieth century".

== Early life ==
Durbin was born in 1906, the son of a Baptist minister. He was educated at Plympton and Exmouth Elementary Schools; Hele's School, Exeter; Taunton School; and New College, Oxford. At Oxford he studied zoology, followed by PPE, and became one of what Ben Pimlott described as 'the "Cole group" of distinguished young socialists'. He befriended Hugh Gaitskell (later, leader of the Labour Party 1955–63) during the 1926 United Kingdom general strike, when he undertook public speaking tasks on behalf of the strikers in and around Oxford, and Gaitskell acted as his driver. In 1929, he was awarded a Ricardo scholarship to study economics at University College, London, where Gaitskell was already on the teaching staff and their friendship, which lasted until Durbin's death, cemented itself.

== Economic career ==
In autumn 1930 he was appointed to a lectureship in economics at the London School of Economics (LSE), where he remained until 1940. Lecturer and Senior Lecturer in Economics, London School of Economics, 1930–1945.

== Political career ==
Politically, Durbin defined himself as a 'militant Moderate'. He believed that capitalism needed to be gradually reformed in order to take advantage of its economic growth to construct a socialist system, partially reversing the party's left-wing shift during the Great Depression and Ramsay MacDonald's departure from the party to form the National Government.

In 1931 he was the unsuccessful Labour Parliamentary candidate for East Grinstead, where Gaitskell spoke for him, addressing a meeting which included 'rowdy but good-natured Tory opposition', and in 1935 he stood for Gillingham, Kent, where, in his selection speech, Durbin famously prioritised the preservation of political democracy over the pursuit of both socialism and peace.

In early 1939 he joined with Douglas Jay and Hugh Gaitskell in urging the Labour Party leadership to agree to the government's proposal for military conscription, so long as there was a quid pro quo in the form of '"conscription of wealth" (a wealth tax). Instead, the Labour Party refused to support conscription at all. Once war was declared, Durbin was temporarily seconded to the Economic Section of the War Cabinet Secretariat, with other notable economists such as Lionel Robbins and the young Harold Wilson, 1940–1942 (during which time he penned The Politics of Democratic Socialism, described by Professor David Marquand as consummating "[t]he marriage between Keynesianism and Fabianism"); and then was temporary Personal Assistant to Clement Attlee, Deputy Prime Minister, 1942–1945.

Durbin was elected Labour MP for Edmonton in 1945, and was amongst those invited to Hugh Dalton's "Young Victors' Dinner", held at St Ermin's Hotel, off Victoria Street SW1. As other guests included George Brown, Richard Crossman, John Freeman, Hugh Gaitskell, Harold Wilson and Woodrow Wyatt, it is fairly clear that Durbin was regarded as a man of the future. He was Dalton's Parliamentary Private Secretary from 1945–47, and started a ministerial career as Parliamentary Secretary, Ministry of Works, 1947–1948.

On 3 September 1948 Durbin drowned while rescuing one of his daughters from the sea at Strangles Beach, south of Bude, on the coast of Cornwall.

== Legacy ==
Writing in The Times after Durbin's death, Hugh Gaitskell paid tribute to Durbin's 'clarity of purpose' and 'well defined set of moral values and social ideals'. Gaitskell wrote that Durbin 'insisted in applying the process of reasoning unflinchingly and with complete intellectual integrity to all human problems' – including a consistent opposition to the dictatorship of Stalin, for 'he would not sentimentalise about tyranny, which seemed to him equally odious everywhere'. Gaitskell noted in his diary: "There is ... nobody else in my life whom I can consult on the most fundamental issues, knowing that I shall get the guidance I want".

Despite his early death, Durbin continued to influence Labour Party thinking throughout the 1950s, particularly Gaitskell (who became party leader in 1955) and Labour revisionist Anthony Crosland.

Durbin was also an influence on the founders of the Social Democratic Party (SDP) in 1981. For the SDP, Durbin's writing provided a model for a successful fight against the left within the Labour Party.

== Publications ==
- Purchasing Power and Trade Depression: a critique of under-consumption theories (Jonathan Cape, London and Toronto, 1933)
- Socialist Credit Policy (Victor Gollancz, London, 1934)
- The Problem of Credit Policy (Chapman and Hall, London, 1935)
- (Editor) War and Democracy: essays on the causes and prevention of war (Kegan Paul and Co, London, 1938)
- How to Pay for the War (G Routledge and Sons, London, 1939)
- Personal Aggressiveness and War (Kegan Paul and Co, London, 1939)
- The Politics of Democratic Socialism (G. Routledge and Sons, London, 1940)
- What Have we to Defend? A brief critical examination of the British social tradition (G. Routledge and Sons, London, 1942)
- Problems of Economic Planning (Routledge and Kegan Paul, London, 1949)

== Sources ==
- Ellis, Catherine (2004). "Durbin, Evan Frank Mottram (1906–1948)". Oxford Dictionary of National Biography (online ed.). Oxford University Press. doi:10.1093/ref:odnb/39462. (Subscription, Wikipedia Library access or UK public library membership required.)
- Times Guide to the House of Commons, 1945

Parliament of the United Kingdom
Preceded by Frank Broad	Member of Parliament for Edmonton; 1945–1948	Succeeded by Austen Albu
