= Retherford =

Retherford is a surname. Notable people with the surname include:

- Robert Retherford (1912–1981), American physicist
- Wes Retherford (born 1984), American politician
- Zain Retherford (born 1995), American wrestler

== See also ==
- Rutherford (name)
