= Jack Rutherford =

Jack Rutherford may refer to:

- Jack Rutherford (cricketer) (1929–2022), Australian cricketer
- Jack Rutherford (footballer, born 1892) (1892–1930), English footballer for Brighton & Hove Albion, Bristol Rovers and Gillingham
- Jack Rutherford (footballer, born 1908), English footballer for Gillingham and Watford
- Jack Rutherford (actor) (1893–1982), British film and television actor
- Jock Rutherford (1884–1963), English footballer sometimes known as Jack or Jackie

== See also ==
- John Rutherford (disambiguation)
