= Austen Albu =

British politician

- Albu in 1950

Minister of State for Economic Affairs
- In office 27 January 1965 – 7 January 1967
- Prime Minister: Harold Wilson
- Preceded by: Anthony Crosland
- Succeeded by: Thomas Urwin

Member of Parliament for Edmonton
- In office 13 November 1948 – 8 February 1974
- Preceded by: Evan Durbin
- Succeeded by: Ted Graham

Personal details
- Born: 21 September 1903
- Died: 23 November 1994 (aged 91)
- Party: Labour (until 1981); SDP (1981-88)
- Spouse: Marie Jahoda

Austen Harry Albu (21 September 1903 – 23 November 1994) was a British Labour Member of Parliament for Edmonton for 25 years.

== Personal life ==
Albu was born in London in 1903 to Ferdinand and Beatrice Albu. He was educated at Tonbridge School, Kent, and the City and Guilds College.

He married his first wife, Rose Marks, in 1929. They had two sons before her death in 1956. In 1958, he married the Anglo-Austrian social psychologist Marie Jahoda.

== Career ==
During the 1930s and early 1940s, Albu worked at Aladdin Industries in Greenford. In the later 1940s, he was Deputy President of the Governmental Sub-Commission of the British Control Commission in Germany during the Allied occupation following World War II, where he advocated the establishment of a centrally planned economy for the country, thus favouring the social democratic approach. Returning to Britain in 1947, he was the Deputy Director of the British Institute of Management for a short period until his election to parliament.

Albu first won his Edmonton seat at a by-election in 1948, and held it until his retirement at the February 1974 general election. From 1965 to 1967, he was the Minister of State for Economic Affairs. He later joined the Social Democratic Party (SDP).

He was a Fellow of Imperial College of Science and Technology. He was also a writer of several essays, the most cited being Socialism and the study of man. He is also attributed as one of the authors of New Fabian Essays (1952).

Parliament of the United Kingdom
Preceded by Evan Durbin	Member of Parliament for Edmonton; 1948 – Feb. 1974	Succeeded by Ted Graham
Political offices
Preceded by Anthony Crosland	Minister of State for Economic Affairs; 1965–1967	Succeeded by Thomas Urwin
Party political offices
Preceded by John Parker	Chairman of the Fabian Society; 1953–1954	Succeeded by Harold Wilson
