= Frank Broad =

United Kingdom politician (1874-1956)

Frank Broad JP
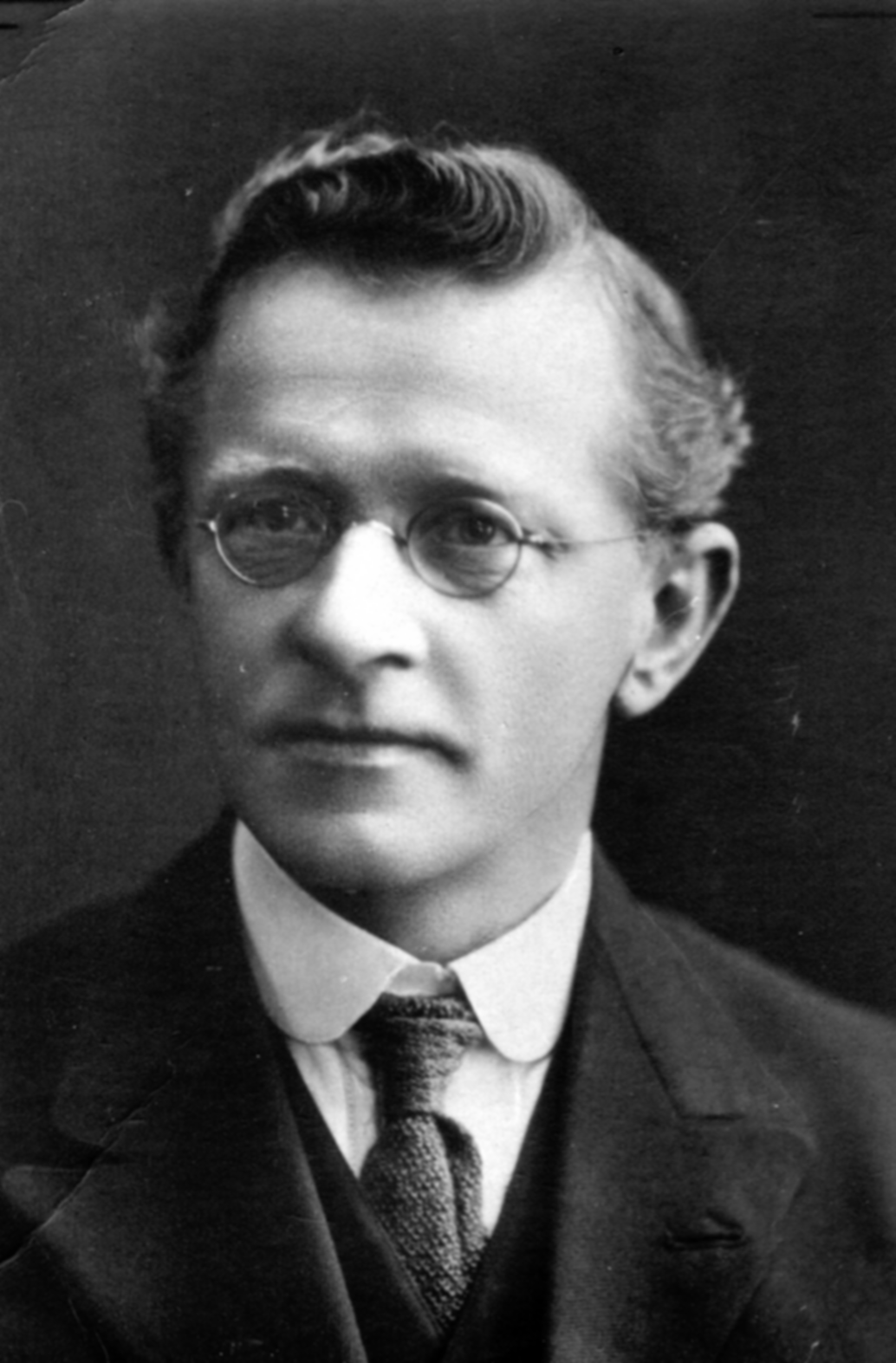
- Broad c. 1922

Member of Parliament for Edmonton
- In office 15 November 1922 – 27 October 1931
- Preceded by: Sir Alfred Warren
- Succeeded by: John Chalmers

Member of Parliament for Edmonton
- In office 14 November 1935 – 5 July 1945
- Preceded by: John Chalmers
- Succeeded by: Evan Durbin

Personal details
- Born: Francis Alfred Broad; 1874 Hammersmith, London
- Died: 3 January 1956 (aged 81–82) Edmonton, London
- Party: Independent Labour Party
- Other political affiliations: Co-operative Party, Amalgamated Engineering Union
- Spouse: Eliza Macer
- Children: William Cyril, Herbert Frank and Sidney Thomas
- Occupation: Scientific Instrument Maker

Francis Alfred Broad JP (1874 – 3 January 1956) was a Labour politician in the United Kingdom who served as Member of Parliament (MP) for the Municipal Borough of Edmonton during the years 1922–1931 and 1935–1945.

One of the founder members (Note: A printed union membership card suggests F. A Broad, by trade a[n] Electrical Instrument Maker, was member number 33 of the South London number 5 branch of the Scientific Instrument Makers' Trades Society and was elected on 26 September 1893. It is signed by Broad, the president J Holmes and the secretary H J Carter) of the Amalgamated Instrument Makers Trade Society, (Note: We are following the source here. However, the archives of the Amalgamated Instrument Makers Society indicate that the society was formed in 1887 as the "Scientific Instrument Makers' Trade Society") Broad was president when, in 1920, the union joined the Amalgamated Engineering Union (AEU). He remained a member of the AEU until his death, stating in the commons in 1931 that "... I have never been a paid officer of that union but I have 40 years membership in it". He joined the Independent Labour Party in 1893.

In July 1923, on the subject of birth control, Broad "... asked the Minister of Health whether his Department will raise any objection to birth control information being given at infant welfare centres to married women who desire it by voluntary workers attached to the centres, or otherwise to their being informed, on request, where such information can be obtained?". Mr Chamberlain replied that his "... view is that such information as is referred to should not be given at infant welfare centres, but that women for whom it appears to be needed on medical grounds should be referred to a private doctor or a hospital". In May 1924, Broad led a delegation of the birth control movement to the then health minister, Clydesdale MP John Wheatley. The delegates included H. G. Wells, the Hon. Mrs Bertrand (Dora) Russell, Dr Frances Huxley, and others. Wheatley dodged the issue with the pronouncement "A clear distinction must be drawn between allowing access to knowledge, and actually distributing knowledge".

Broad produced two papers. A memorandum on birth control: presented on 9 May 1924 to the Workers Birth Control Group, and The organised worker: problems of Trade union structure and policy; a report by the Industrial Policy Committee published by the Independent Labour Party (Great Britain). Broad was part of the Empire Parliamentary Association 1926 delegation to Australia chaired by the Marquis of Salisbury. At the civic reception in the Sydney Millions Club on the day of arrival, 17 September 1926, Broad said "A country like Australia is capable of absorbing a great number of people and the problem must be precipitated in a proper spirit of understanding".

He was made a justice of the peace in 1933. Broad announced in 1944 that he did not intend to stand as a parliamentary candidate again, saying, "The world is rather cluttered up with older men". He retired from politics in 1945. He was awarded the freedom of Edmonton in September 1946.

He was for a time a governor of The Latymer School and a board member of the North Middlesex Hospital in Edmonton; the same hospital where he died from a short illness on 3 January 1956. Broad House, Fore Street, Edmonton, London, is a permanent memorial. It was opened in 1954 by Clement Attlee. Broad was survived by his wife since 1900, Eliza Broad née Macer and three sons.

Parliament of the United Kingdom
Preceded by Sir Alfred Warren	Member of Parliament for Edmonton; 1921–1931	Succeeded by John Chalmers
Preceded by John Chalmers	Member of Parliament for Edmonton; 1935–1945	Succeeded by Evan Durbin
