= Albert Feebery =

English footballer

Personal information
- Full name: Albert Feebery
- Date of birth: 9 April 1889
- Place of birth: Hucknall, England
- Date of death: 1964 (aged 74–75)
- Height: 5 ft 10 in (1.78 m)
- Position: Left half

Senior career*
Years	Team	Apps	(Gls)
- Hucknall
1910–1911	Nottingham Forest	0	(0)
1911–1914	Coventry City		
1914–1924	Crystal Palace (Note: Figures include appearances and goals for Football League matches only)	91	(7)
1924–192?	Folkestone		
- * Club domestic league appearances and goals

Albert Feebery (9 April 1889 – 1964) was an English professional footballer who played as a left half. He made 91 appearances in the Football League for Crystal Palace. He also played in the Southern League for Coventry City and Folkestone.

== Life and career ==
Feebery was born in Hucknall, Nottinghamshire, in 1889. He came from a footballing family: two brothers, Jack and Alf, also played in the Football League, and three others played at lesser levels. Feebery began his career with local club Hucknall, and was on the books of Nottingham Forest without playing for their league team, before signing for Southern League club Coventry City in 1911. After three years, during which he switched from left half to centre half, he moved on to another Southern League club, Crystal Palace. He played two seasons in the Southern League for Palace either side of the First World War, and another three after their election to the Football League, and captained the team for some of that time. In 1924, the 35-year-old Feebery returned to the Southern League with Folkestone. By December 1925, he was working as a milkman in Penge. Feebery died in 1964.
