= 1948 Edmonton by-election =

UK parliamentary by-election

A by-election for the constituency of Edmonton in the United Kingdom House of Commons was held on 13 November 1948, caused by the death of the incumbent Labour MP Evan Durbin. The result was a hold for the Labour Party, with their candidate Austen Albu winning with a significantly reduced majority of 3,327.

== Result ==
Edmonton by-election, 1948
Party	Candidate	Votes	%	±%
Labour	Austen Albu	26,164	53.4	−14.8
Conservative	Edwin P. Hubbard	22,837	46.6	+17.6
Majority		3,327	6.8	−32.4
Turnout		49,001	62.7	−6.3
Registered electors		78,204		
Labour hold		Swing		

== Previous result ==
General election 1945: Edmonton
Party	Candidate	Votes	%	±%
Labour	Evan Durbin	33,163	68.2	+13.01
Conservative	Geoffrey Sparrow	14,094	29.0	−15.81
Independent Progressive	JA Ward	1,382	2.8	New
Majority		19,069	39.2	+28.82
Turnout		48,639	69.0	+4.51
Registered electors		70,470		
Labour hold		Swing		
