= Alfred Warren =

British politician

Sir Alfred Warren OBE (6 February 1856 - 1 August 1927) was a Conservative Party politician who served as borough councillor and mayor of Poplar, and then as a Member of Parliament.

Alfred Harman Warren was born in Poplar on 6 February 1856 and educated at the local Wesleyan School. He was a member of Poplar Borough Council, serving as Mayor of Poplar from 1913 to 1918.

In the June 1918 King's Birthday Honours Alfred Warren was both knighted and made an Officer of the Order of the British Empire (OBE). The London Gazette entries for these two honours summarise the extent of his activities in support of the war effort during the First World War:

- For the knighthood: "For public and local services. Mayor of Poplar for the last five years. Responsible, at the invitation of the Army Council, for raising the 239th Troop, Royal Engineers. Inaugurated and raised the 1/6th London Regiment, Poplar Volunteer Battalion, and provided the equipment and upkeep. Chairman of the Local Tribunal. Chairman of the Local War Savings Committee. Founded a voluntary fund for alleviating distress caused by air raids. Chairman and Treasurer of the War Hospital Supply Depot."
- For the OBE: "Chairman of Local Tribunal, National Relief Fund and Belgian Refugees' Committee, Poplar."

At the 1918 General Election Sir Alfred was elected to Parliament as member for Edmonton in Middlesex, standing as a Conservative supporter of David Lloyd George's coalition Government. He stood again at the general election of 1922, but was defeated by the Labour Party candidate, Frank Broad.

Active in the Manchester Unity of Oddfellows, he served as its Grand Master, and was also president of the National Conference of Friendly Societies.

Sir Alfred Harman Warren died on 1 August 1927 at the age of 71.

Civic offices
Preceded by Edwin John Aldrick	Mayor of Poplar; 1913–1918	Succeeded by William Henry Lax
