= Edmonton (constituency) =

Parliamentary constituency in the United Kingdom, 1918–2024

Coordinates: 51.628°N 0.055°W

- Borough constituency for the House of Commons
- Boundary of Edmonton in Greater London
- County: Greater London
- Electorate: 64,356 (December 2010)
- Major settlements: Bush Hill Park, Edmonton and Ponders End

Current constituency
- Created: 1918
- Member of Parliament: None
- Seats: One
- Created from: Enfield

Edmonton was a constituency (Note: A borough constituency (for the purposes of election expenses and type of returning officer)) in Greater London, created in 1918 and represented in the House of Commons of the UK Parliament by Kate Osamor from 2015 until its abolition for the 2024 general election, who was elected for the Labour and Co-operative party; she briefly lost the Labour whip between January and May 2024. (Note: As with all constituencies, the constituency elects one Member of Parliament (MP) by the first past the post system of election at least every five years.)

Further to the completion of the 2023 Periodic Review of Westminster constituencies, the bulk of the seat was incorporated into the new constituency of Edmonton and Winchmore Hill. Ponders End was moved back to Enfield North.

== History ==
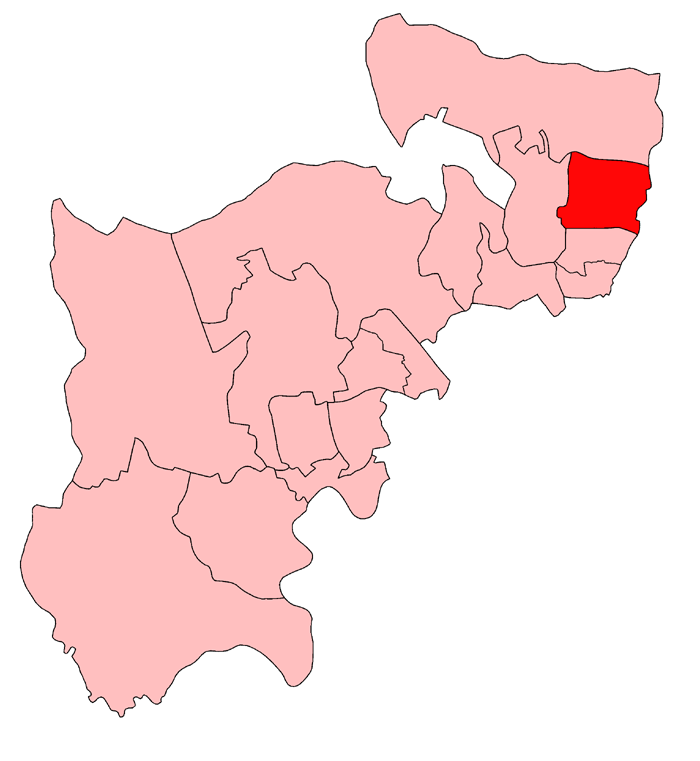
Edmonton in Middlesex 1918–50

The seat dates back to 1918 at which time it was at an extremity of the largely urbanised London postal district outside of the County of London (1889–1965). It was a railway commuter town core outweighed by businesses beside the River Lea engaged in manufacturing, storage, distribution, and construction industries, among others. Population and housing were significantly less before the middle of the 19th century.

The seat was won by successive Labour party candidates since 1935 until narrowly gained by a Conservative at the 1983 United Kingdom general election. The latter's majority increased in 1987 then reduced to a marginal majority in 1992. After 1997 a trend of increased Labour majorities developed. Osamor's majority of 2015, 37.3%, made it the 43rd-safest Labour seat in ranking in 2015. Likewise, save for a Conservative-leaning ward, Bush Hill Park, Edmonton's other wards usually elect Labour Party councillors since 1997.

== Boundaries ==
Map of boundaries 2010-2024

1918–1950: The Urban District of Edmonton.

1950–1974: The Municipal Borough of Edmonton.

1974–1983: The London Borough of Enfield wards of Angel Road, Bush Hill South, Church Street, Craig Park, Jubilee, New Park, Pymmes, St Alphege, St Peter's, and Silver Street.

1983–2010: The London Borough of Enfield wards of Angel Road, Craig Park, Huxley, Jubilee, Latymer, Raglan, St Alphege, St Mark's, St Peter's, Village, and Weir Hall.

2010–2024: The London Borough of Enfield wards of Bush Hill Park, Edmonton Green, Haselbury, Jubilee, Lower Edmonton, Ponders End, and Upper Edmonton.

=== 2007 boundary review ===
Following its review of parliamentary representation in North London, the Boundary Commission for England made some changes to Edmonton for the 2010 general election. Ponders End ward was transferred from the constituency of Enfield North to Edmonton. Part of Southbury ward was transferred to Enfield North. Parts of Grange ward, Palmers Green ward, and Bowes ward were transferred from Edmonton to Enfield, Southgate. Part of Bush Hill Park ward and a tiny part of Upper Edmonton ward were transferred from Enfield, Southgate to Edmonton.

== Members of Parliament ==
Year	Member	Party
1918	Alfred Warren	Conservative
1922	Frank Broad	Labour
1931	John Rutherford	Conservative
1935	Frank Broad	Labour Co-op
1945	Evan Durbin	Labour
1948	Austen Albu	Labour
1974	Ted Graham	Labour Co-op
1983	Ian Twinn	Conservative
1997	Andy Love	Labour Co-op
2015	Kate Osamor	Labour Co-op

== Election results ==
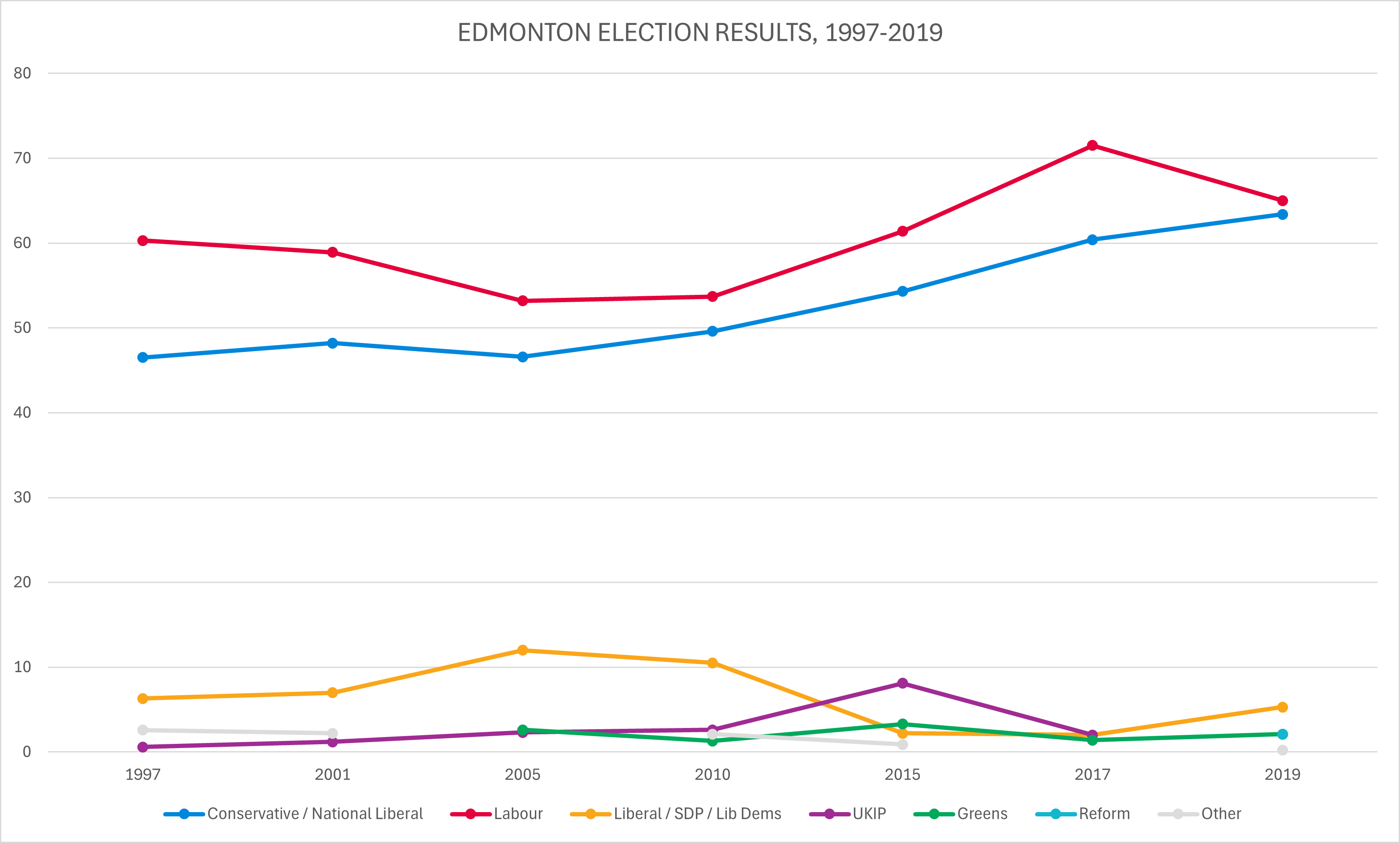
Election results 1997-2019

=== Elections in the 2010s ===
General election 2019: Edmonton
Party	Candidate	Votes	%	±%
Labour Co-op	Kate Osamor	26,217	65.0	−6.5
Conservative	James Hockney	10,202	25.3	+2.2
Liberal Democrats	David Schmitz	2,145	5.3	+3.3
Green	Benjamin Maydon	862	2.1	+0.7
Brexit Party	Sauchin Sehgal	840	2.1	New
Independent	Sabriye Warsame	75	0.2	New
Majority		16,015	39.7	−8.7
Turnout		40,341	61.5	−4.9
Registered electors		65,568		
Labour Co-op hold		Swing	-4.3	

General election 2017: Edmonton
Party	Candidate	Votes	%	±%
Labour Co-op	Kate Osamor	31,221	71.5	+10.1
Conservative	Gonul Daniels	10,106	23.1	−1.0
UKIP	Nigel Sussman	860	2.0	−6.1
Liberal Democrats	David Schmitz	858	2.0	−0.2
Green	Benjamin Gill	633	1.4	−1.9
Majority		21,115	48.4	+11.1
Turnout		43,676	66.4	+3.8
Registered electors		65,777		
Labour Co-op hold		Swing	+5.5	

General election 2015: Edmonton
Party	Candidate	Votes	%	±%
Labour Co-op	Kate Osamor	25,388	61.4	+7.7
Conservative	Gonul Daniels	9,969	24.1	−5.7
UKIP	Neville Watson	3,366	8.1	+5.5
Green	Douglas Coker	1,358	3.3	+2.0
Liberal Democrats	David Schmitz	897	2.2	−8.3
TUSC	Lewis Peacock	360	0.9	New
Majority		15,419	37.3	+13.4
Turnout		41,338	62.6	−0.6
Registered electors		66,016		
Labour Co-op hold		Swing	+7.7	

General election 2010: Edmonton
Party	Candidate	Votes	%	±%
Labour Co-op	Andy Love	21,665	53.7	−2.3
Conservative	Andrew Charalambous	12,052	29.8	+2.3
Liberal Democrats	Iarla Kilbane-Dawe	4,252	10.5	−1.5
UKIP	Roy Freshwater	1,036	2.6	+0.3
Green	Jack Johnson	516	1.3	−1.0
Reform 2000	Erol Basarik	379	0.9	New
Christian	Clive Morrison	350	0.9	New
Independent	David McLean	127	0.3	New
Majority		9,613	23.9	−4.6
Turnout		40,377	63.2	+5.7
Registered electors		63,904		
Labour Co-op hold		Swing	−2.3	

=== Elections in the 2000s ===
General election 2005: Edmonton
Party	Candidate	Votes	%	±%
Labour Co-op	Andy Love	18,456	53.2	−5.7
Conservative	Lionel Zetter	10,381	29.9	−0.9
Liberal Democrats	Iarla Kilbane-Dawe	4,162	12.0	+5.0
Green	Nina Armstrong	889	2.6	New
UKIP	Gwyneth Rolph	815	2.3	+1.1
Majority		8,075	23.3	−4.8
Turnout		34,703	59.1	+2.8
Registered electors		59,050		
Labour Co-op hold		Swing	−2.4	

General election 2001: Edmonton
Party	Candidate	Votes	%	±%
Labour Co-op	Andy Love	20,481	58.9	−1.4
Conservative	David Burrowes	10,709	30.8	+0.6
Liberal Democrats	Douglas Taylor	2,438	7.0	+0.7
UKIP	Gwyneth Rolph	406	1.2	+0.6
Reform 2000	Erol Basarik	344	1.0	New
Socialist Alliance	Howard Medwell	296	0.9	New
Independent	Ram Saxena	100	0.3	New
Majority		9,772	28.1	−2.0
Turnout		34,774	56.3	−14.0
Registered electors		61,788		
Labour Co-op hold		Swing	−1.0	

=== Elections in the 1990s ===
General election 1997: Edmonton
Party	Candidate	Votes	%	±%
Labour Co-op	Andy Love	27,029	60.3	+15.2
Conservative	Ian Twinn	13,557	30.2	−16.0
Liberal Democrats	Andrew Wiseman	2,847	6.3	−1.9
Referendum	James Wright	708	1.6	New
BNP	Bruce Cowd	437	1.0	New
UKIP	Penelope Weald	260	0.6	New
Majority		13,472	30.1	N/A
Turnout		44,838	70.3	−5.4
Registered electors		63,793		
Labour Co-op gain from Conservative		Swing	+15.6	

General election 1992: Edmonton
Party	Candidate	Votes	%	±%
Conservative	Ian Twinn	22,076	46.3	−4.9
Labour Co-op	Andy Love	21,483	45.0	+9.0
Liberal Democrats	Elwyn V. Jones	3,940	8.3	−4.5
Natural Law	Elizabeth Solley	207	0.4	New
Majority		593	1.3	−13.7
Turnout		47,706	75.6	+3.1
Registered electors		63,052		
Conservative hold		Swing	-7.0	

=== Elections in the 1980s ===
General election 1987: Edmonton
Party	Candidate	Votes	%	±%
Conservative	Ian Twinn	24,556	51.2	+8.7
Labour	Brian Grayston	17,270	36.0	−3.8
SDP	Michael Lawson	6,115	12.8	−4.0
Majority		7,286	15.2	+12.5
Turnout		47,941	72.5	+3.6
Registered electors		66,080		
Conservative hold		Swing	+6.2	

General election 1983: Edmonton
Party	Candidate	Votes	%	±%
Conservative	Ian Twinn	18,968	42.5	−0.1
Labour Co-op	Ted Graham	17,775	39.8	−7.3
Liberal	Laurence Brass	7,523	16.9	+9.4
BNP	David J. Bruce	372	0.8	−2.0
Majority		1,193	2.7	N/A
Turnout		44,638	68.9	−5.7
Registered electors		64,809		
Conservative gain from Labour Co-op		Swing	+3.6	

=== Elections in the 1970s ===
General election 1979: Edmonton
Party	Candidate	Votes	%	±%
Labour Co-op	Ted Graham	20,713	47.14	−1.93
Conservative	John Attwood	18,733	42.64	+10.13
Liberal	William Wintle	3,726	7.46	−6.36
National Front	David J. Bruce	1,213	2.76	−1.84
Majority		1,980	4.50	−12.06
Turnout		44,385	74.64	+7.58
Registered electors		58,860		
Labour Co-op hold		Swing		

General election October 1974: Edmonton
Party	Candidate	Votes	%	±%
Labour Co-op	Ted Graham	20,229	49.07	+3.77
Conservative	J. Attwood	13,401	32.51	−0.35
Liberal	John Danny	5,699	13.82	−3.98
National Front	D.J. Bruce	1,895	4.60	+0.76
Majority		6,828	16.56	+4.12
Turnout		41,224	67.06	−8.37
Registered electors		61,476		
Labour Co-op hold		Swing		

General election February 1974: Edmonton
Party	Candidate	Votes	%	±%
Labour Co-op	Ted Graham	20,837	45.30	−3.76
Conservative	J. Gordon	15,114	32.86	−11.10
Liberal	Patricia Greenwood	8,186	17.80	+10.81
National Front	David J. Bruce	1,765	3.84	New
Independent	L.R. Pittard	98	0.21	New
Majority		5,723	12.44	+7.34
Turnout		46,000	75.43	+8.99
Registered electors		60,985		
Labour Co-op hold		Swing		

General election 1970: Edmonton
Party	Candidate	Votes	%	±%
Labour	Austen Albu	20,626	49.06	−9.50
Conservative	Edwin P. Hubbard	18,481	43.96	+2.52
Liberal	Graham Longley	2,937	6.99	New
Majority		2,145	5.10	−12.02
Turnout		42,044	66.44	+5.73
Registered electors		63,277		
Labour hold		Swing		

=== Elections in the 1960s ===
General election 1966: Edmonton
Party	Candidate	Votes	%	±%
Labour	Austen Albu	26,422	58.56	+9.36
Conservative	Edwin P. Hubbard	18,697	41.44	+2.59
Majority		7,725	17.12	+6.77
Turnout		45,109	72.17	−4.81
Registered electors		62,520		
Labour hold		Swing		

General election 1964: Edmonton
Party	Candidate	Votes	%	±%
Labour	Austen Albu	24,373	49.20	−1.25
Conservative	Ross McWhirter	19,245	38.85	−10.70
Liberal	Denis Coberman	5,917	11.95	New
Majority		5,128	10.35	+9.45
Turnout		49,535	76.98	+1.13
Registered electors		64,348		
Labour hold		Swing		

=== Elections in the 1950s ===
General election 1959: Edmonton
Party	Candidate	Votes	%	±%
Labour	Austen Albu	25,958	50.45	−6.14
Conservative	William H. Bishop	25,497	49.55	+6.14
Majority		461	0.90	−12.28
Turnout		51,095	75.85	+1.38
Registered electors		67,837		
Labour hold		Swing		

General election 1955: Edmonton
Party	Candidate	Votes	%	±%
Labour	Austen Albu	30,232	56.59	−1.84
Conservative	Elsie S. Olsen	23,194	43.41	+1.84
Majority		7,038	13.18	−3.68
Turnout		53,426	74.47	−8.06
Registered electors		71,739		
Labour hold		Swing		

General election 1951: Edmonton
Party	Candidate	Votes	%	±%
Labour	Austen Albu	36,023	58.43	+3.36
Conservative	Elsie S. Olsen	25,631	41.57	+4.67
Majority		10,392	16.86	−1.38
Turnout		61,654	82.53	−1.97
Registered electors		74,707		
Labour hold		Swing		

General election 1950: Edmonton
Party	Candidate	Votes	%	±%
Labour	Austen Albu	34,897	55.07	−13.13
Conservative	Edwin P. Hubbard	23,325	36.81	−2.19
Liberal	George E. Thornton	5,143	8.12	New
Majority		11,572	18.26	−20.94
Turnout		63,365	84.50	+15.5
Registered electors		74,988		
Labour hold		Swing		

=== Elections in the 1940s ===
1948 Edmonton by-election
Party	Candidate	Votes	%	±%
Labour	Austen Albu	26,164	53.4	−14.8
Conservative	Edwin P. Hubbard	22,837	46.6	+17.6
Majority		3,327	6.8	−32.4
Turnout		49,001	62.7	−6.3
Registered electors		78,204		
Labour hold		Swing		

General election 1945: Edmonton
Party	Candidate	Votes	%	±%
Labour	Evan Durbin	33,163	68.2	+13.01
Conservative	Geoffrey Sparrow	14,094	29.0	−15.81
Independent Progressive	JA Ward	1,382	2.8	New
Majority		19,069	39.2	+28.82
Turnout		48,639	69.0	+4.51
Registered electors		70,470		
Labour hold		Swing		

=== Elections in the 1930s ===
General election 1935: Edmonton
Party	Candidate	Votes	%	±%
Labour Co-op	Frank Broad	21,940	55.19	+11.99
Conservative	John Rutherford	17,813	44.81	−11.99
Majority		4,127	10.38	N/A
Turnout		39,753	64.49	−5.71
Registered electors		61,640		
Labour Co-op gain from Conservative		Swing		

General election 1931: Edmonton
Party	Candidate	Votes	%	±%
Conservative	John Chalmers	18,774	56.8	+16.1
Labour Co-op	Frank Broad	14,250	43.2	−16.1
Majority		4,524	13.6	N/A
Turnout		33,024	70.2	+0.7
Registered electors		47,044		
Conservative gain from Labour		Swing	+16.1	

=== Elections in the 1920s ===
General election 1929: Edmonton
Party	Candidate	Votes	%	±%
Labour	Frank Broad	17,555	59.3	+6.2
Unionist	George Jarrett	12,044	40.7	−6.2
Majority		5,511	18.6	+12.4
Turnout		29,599	69.5	−1.1
Registered electors		42,586		
Labour hold		Swing	+6.2	

General election 1924: Edmonton
Party	Candidate	Votes	%	±%
Labour	Frank Broad	11,614	53.1	−11.3
Unionist	George Jarrett	10,278	46.9	+11.3
Majority		1,336	6.2	−22.6
Turnout		21,892	70.6	+15.8
Registered electors		31,020		
Labour hold		Swing	-11.3	

General election 1923: Edmonton
Party	Candidate	Votes	%	±%
Labour	Frank Broad	10,735	64.4	+19.3
Unionist	Robert Skirving Brown	5,943	35.6	−0.4
Majority		4,792	28.8	+19.7
Turnout		16,678	54.8	−8.0
Registered electors		30,423		
Labour hold		Swing	+9.9	

General election 1922: Edmonton
Party	Candidate	Votes	%	±%
Labour	Frank Broad	8,407	45.1	+19.4
Unionist	Alfred Warren	6,698	36.0	−13.4
Liberal	Edmund Thomas Rhymer	3,522	18.9	+3.8
Majority		1,709	9.1	N/A
Turnout		18,627	62.8	+14.6
Registered electors		29,662		
Labour gain from Unionist		Swing	+16.4	

=== Elections in the 1910s ===
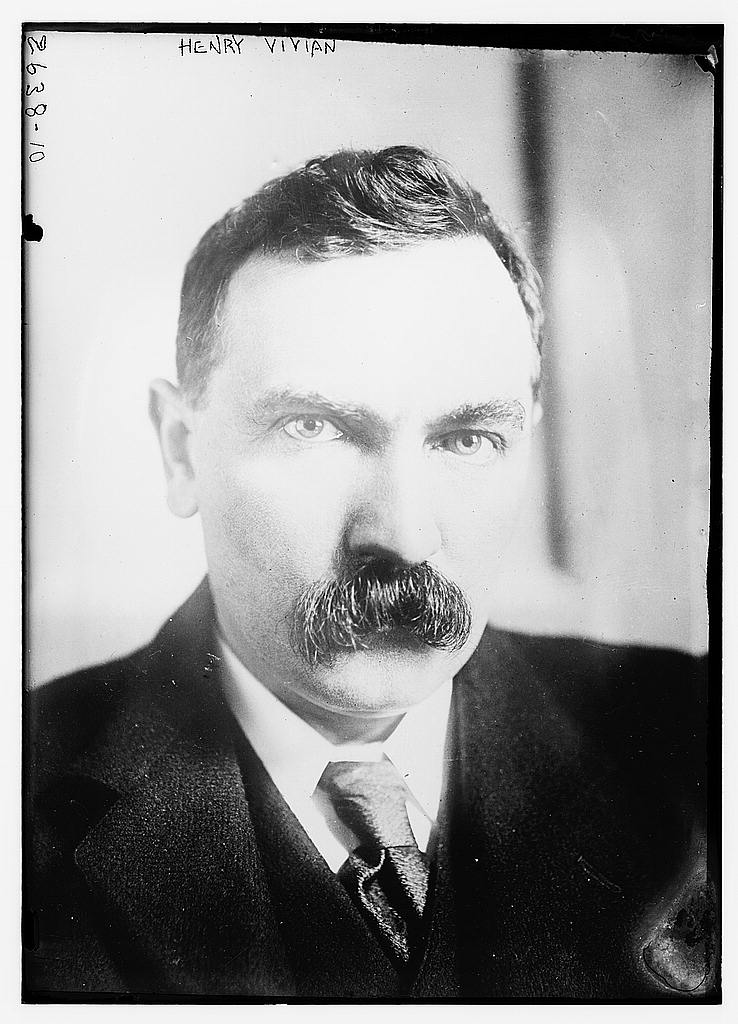
Vivian

General election 1918: Edmonton
Party		Candidate	Votes	%
C	Unionist	Alfred Warren	6,891	49.4
	Labour	Frank Broad	3,575	25.7
	Liberal	Henry Harvey Vivian	2,245	16.1
	Edmonton Pro-Ally & Labour	Henry Barrass	1,223	8.8
Majority			3,316	23.7
Turnout			13,934	48.2
Registered electors			28,930	
	Unionist win (new seat)			

== See also ==
- List of parliamentary constituencies in London
