= Ted Graham, Baron Graham of Edmonton =

British politician (1925–2020)

The Right Honourable The Lord Graham of Edmonton PC
- Portrait by Nick Sinclair, 1992

Opposition Chief Whip of the House of Lords
- In office 5 July 1990 – 2 May 1997
- Leader: Neil Kinnock; John Smith; Margaret Beckett (acting); Tony Blair
- Preceded by: The Lord Ponsonby of Shulbrede
- Succeeded by: The Lord Strathclyde

Lord Commissioner of the Treasury
- In office 14 April 1976 – 4 May 1979
- Prime Minister: James Callaghan
- Preceded by: James Dunn
- Succeeded by: John MacGregor

Member of the House of Lords
- Lord Temporal
- Life peerage 12 September 1983 – 21 March 2020

Member of Parliament for Edmonton
- In office 28 February 1974 – 13 May 1983
- Preceded by: Austen Albu
- Succeeded by: Ian Twinn

Personal details
- Born: Thomas Edward Graham; 26 March 1925 Newcastle upon Tyne, England
- Died: 20 March 2020 (aged 94) Knebworth, England
- Party: Labour and Co-operative
- Spouse: Margaret Golding (m. 1950; died 2005)
- Children: 2
- Relatives: Miriam Stoppard (cousin); Ed Stoppard (cousin); Oona King (cousin)

Thomas Edward Graham, Baron Graham of Edmonton, PC (26 March 1925 – 20 March 2020) was a British Labour and Co-operative politician. He was the Member of Parliament for Edmonton from 1974 to 1983, and became a life peer in 1983.

== Background ==
Thomas Edward Graham was born in Newcastle. During the Second World War he saw active service in the British Army and was seriously injured by enemy fire.

== Political career ==
Graham was educated at the Co-operative College and held several positions in the co-operative movement from 1939, becoming National Secretary for the Co-operative Party. He was a councillor on Enfield Borough Council from 1961, joining the new London Borough of Enfield in 1964 and is a former leader of the London Borough of Enfield.

In 1966, Graham contested Enfield West at that year's general election. He was Member of Parliament for Edmonton from February 1974, serving as a Parliamentary Private Secretary at the Department of Prices and Consumer Protection from 1974 to 1976, then as a government whip from 1976 to 1979, with the title of Lord Commissioner of the Treasury. He was an opposition spokesman on the environment from 1980 to 1983, when he lost his seat in the House of Commons to Ian Twinn as part of Labour's landslide election defeat of that year.

On 12 September 1983, after losing his seat, Graham was created a life peer as Baron Graham of Edmonton, of Edmonton in Greater London. He was Labour Chief Whip 1990–97. He was chairman of the Co-operative Council, and served as President of the 1987 Co-operative Congress. Graham was President of the Institute of Meat and Patron of the Ancient Order of Foresters and of the Edmonton Constituency Labour Party.

On 18 December 1986, Graham was the only Peer in the House of Lords to speak against Lord Halsbury's Local Government Act 1986 (Amendment) Bill, which sought to prohibit the "promotion of homosexuality" by local authorities. This bill subsequently became law as Section 28 of the Local Government Act 1988, when it was reintroduced by David Wilshire in the Commons.

== Personal life ==
Graham married Margaret Golding in 1950. The couple had two sons. His wife was diagnosed with myotonic dystrophy, a condition that both their sons would inherit; she died in 2005 and their sons shortly thereafter.

Graham was a first cousin of Dr. Miriam Stoppard, Lady Hogg, a physician, and her son, actor Ed Stoppard, Miriam's son, as well as politician Oona King, Lady Hogg's's niece. He was a supporter of Humanists UK and lived in Loughton, Essex.

He died at a care home in Knebworth on 20 March 2020, six days before his 95th birthday.

Parliament of the United Kingdom
Preceded by Austen Albu	Member of Parliament for Edmonton; 1974–1983	Succeeded by Ian Twinn
Political offices
Preceded by The Lord Ponsonby of Shulbrede	Opposition Chief Whip in the House of Lords; 1990–1997	Succeeded by The Lord Strathclyde
Party political offices
Preceded by Harold Campbell	General Secretary of the Co-operative Party; 1967 – 1974	Succeeded by David Wise
Preceded by The Lord Ponsonby of Shulbrede	Labour Chief Whip of the House of Lords; 1990–1997	Succeeded by The Lord Carter
