= Alf Feebery =

English footballer

Personal information
- Full name: Alfred Feebery
- Date of birth: 10 September 1909
- Place of birth: Hucknall, England
- Date of death: 23 December 1989 (aged 80)
- Height: 5 ft 9 1/2 in (1.77 m)
- Position: Left back

Senior career*
Years	Team	Apps	(Gls)
- Hucknall Congregationalists
1928–1939	Notts County	221	(1)
1929	→ Newark (loan)		
1939–19??	Bristol Rovers	0	(0)
- * Club domestic league appearances and goals

Alfred Feebery (10 September 1909 – 23 December 1989) was an English professional footballer who played as a left back. He made 221 appearances in the Football League for Notts County. He also played on loan at Midland League club Newark and appeared three times for Bristol Rovers in the abandoned 1939–40 Football League season.

Feebery was born in Hucknall, Nottinghamshire, in 1909. He came from a footballing family: two brothers, Jack and Albert, also played in the Football League, and three others played at lesser levels. He was living in Hucknall at the time of his death, in 1989 at the age of 80.
