= Jim Rutherford (footballer) =

English footballer

Personal information
- Full name: James Rutherford
- Date of birth: 1894
- Place of birth: Bedlington, England
- Date of death: 1924 (aged 29–30)
- Place of death: United States
- Position: Full back

Senior career*
Years	Team	Apps	(Gls)
1919–1920	Ashington		
1920–1922	Brighton & Hove Albion	26	(0)
- * Club domestic league appearances and goals

James Rutherford (1894–1924) was an English professional footballer who played as a full back in the Football League for Brighton & Hove Albion.

== Life and career ==
Rutherford was born in Bedlington, Northumberland, in 1894. He played for Ashington of the Northern Alliance before turning professional with Brighton & Hove Albion of the newly formed Football League Third Division. His older brother Jack was already on Brighton's books, and the pair played in the same team in 15 competitive matches. After losing his place to new signing Jack Feebery in 1921, Rutherford spent the 1921–22 season in the reserves and left the club in September 1922. He moved to the United States where he died in 1924.
