= Jack Feebery =

English footballer (1888–1960)

Personal information
- Full name: John Henry Feebery
- Date of birth: 10 May 1888
- Place of birth: Hucknall, England
- Date of death: 1960 (aged 71)
- Place of death: Nottingham, England
- Positions: Full back; half back

Senior career*
Years	Team	Apps	(Gls)
- Hucknall
19??–1908	Bulwell White Star		
1908–1920	Bolton Wanderers	180	(16)
1920–1921	Exeter City	42	(2)
1921–1924	Brighton & Hove Albion	62	(3)
1924–19??	Mid Rhondda United		
- * Club domestic league appearances and goals

John Henry Feebery (10 May 1888 – 1960) was an English professional footballer who played as a full back or half back. He made nearly 300 appearances in the Football League for Bolton Wanderers, Exeter City and Brighton & Hove Albion.

== Life and career ==
Feebery was born in Hucknall, Nottinghamshire, in 1888. He came from a footballing family: two brothers, Albert and Alf, also played in the Football League, and three others played at lesser levels. Feebery began his career with local clubs Hucknall and Bulwell White Star before signing for First Division club Bolton Wanderers in 1908, initially on amateur forms. He turned professional ahead of the 1909–10 season, and made his senior debut in September against Woolwich Arsenal in a 3–0 win; the Nottingham Evening Post wrote that they played so well that the same team was picked for the next match, "including Feebery, the Bulwell White Star half-back." He remained a regular in the side, playing his final match for the club in a 2–1 defeat at home to Chelsea on 7 February 1920. He made 160 league appearances for Wanderers – all but the 1910–11 season were in the top flight – and scored 16 goals; he had a powerful shot, and was the team's regular free-kick and penalty-taker.

He moved on to Exeter City, about to embark on their maiden season in the newly formed Third Division South. He was ever-present through the campaign, but left the club at the end of it in unusual circumstances. His name was inadvertently left off the retained list, Brighton & Hove Albion's manager Charlie Webb spotted the omission, and promptly signed him before Exeter's officials could fix their mistake. Webb appointed Feebery captain, and he was again ever-present through his first season with his new club. He stayed with Brighton for two more years, taking his appearance count to 67 in all competitions, before leaving on a free transfer to Mid Rhondda United of the Southern League.

Feebery died in Nottingham in early 1960 at the age of 71.
