= James Rutherford (Arkansas politician) =

American politician (1825–1914)

Member of the Arkansas Senate from the 6th district
- In office January 13, 1879 – January 8, 1883
- Preceded by: L. H. Sims
- Succeeded by: B. F. Williamson
- Constituency: Independence and Stone counties

Delegate to 1874 Arkansas Constitutional Convention
- In office July 14, 1874 – September 7, 1874 Serving with James W. Butler
- Constituency: Independence County

Personal details
- Born: July 7, 1825 Rutherfordton, North Carolina
- Died: February 6, 1914 (aged 88) Batesville, Arkansas
- Party: Whig; Democratic
- Spouse: Mariah Louisa Hynson (m. 1862)
- Children: 6
- Relatives: Skip Rutherford (great- great- grandson)
- Occupation: Farmer

Military service
- Allegiance: Confederate States
- Service: Confederate States Army
- Years of service: 1862–1865
- Rank: Lieutenant Colonel
- Unit: 7th Arkansas Infantry; 46th Arkansas Infantry (Mounted)
- Wars: American Civil War

James A. Rutherford (July 7, 1825 – February 6, 1914) was a prominent settler of Independence County, Arkansas. Rutherford served in the Confederate States Army during the American Civil War. During the Reconstruction era, Rutherford served in the Arkansas Senate and at the 1874 Arkansas Constitutional Convention.

== Early life ==
James Rutherford was born on July 7, 1825, to Walter Blythe Rutherford Sr. and Sarah (née McTyre) Rutherford in Rutherfordton, North Carolina. The family had lived in the area since before the American Revolution and it was named for American Revolutionary War General Griffith Rutherford, a distant relative. He relocated to Independence County, Arkansas on property claimed from an uncle's debtor in 1849. His parents followed the next year and his father became a pastor in the Presbyterian church at Batesville, Arkansas. Rutherford was elected Independence County justice of the peace at age 25 after one year in the area, and served four years.

== Civil War ==
Rutherford initially opposed Arkansas secession from the United States. But following entry to the Confederate States of America, Rutherford enlisted in the Confederate States Army. He began as first lieutenant in the 7th Arkansas Infantry within Company E, the "Pike Guards", of Independence County, commanded by Captain John H. Dye. He succeeded Dye in command at Bowling Green, Kentucky, in 1862, and received a battlefield promotion to lieutenant colonel during the Battle of Shiloh.

Rutherford resigned from the 7th on July 1, 1862, and returned to Arkansas, where he became captain and quartermaster in the 46th Arkansas Infantry (Mounted), also serving as provost marshal. He was captured at Grand Glaise, Arkansas on January 27, 1864, and imprisoned in Little Rock until Major General Frederick Steele ordered his release on July 14, 1864. Rutherford surrendered with General M. Jeff Thompson on May 11, 1865, and was paroled at Jacksonport, Arkansas on June 5, 1865.

== Reconstruction era ==
Rutherford returned to his farm and became one of the largest landowners in the area, owning three farms operated by sharecroppers and a livestock operation. He was elected as a delegate to the 1874 Arkansas Constitutional Convention, which re-wrote the Constitution of Arkansas. He contributed to the creation of the Sulphur Rock School District.

Rutherford was elected to a four-year term in the Arkansas Senate representing the 6th district (Independence and Stone counties) in the 22nd and 23rd Arkansas General Assembly. In 1880, Rutherford chaired the finance committee and a special committee on revenue, which sought to repudiate the Holford Bonds by excluding them from the reports of the Arkansas State Auditor and the Arkansas State Treasurer.
