= Pascale Fonteneau =

French-born Belgian journalist and novelist

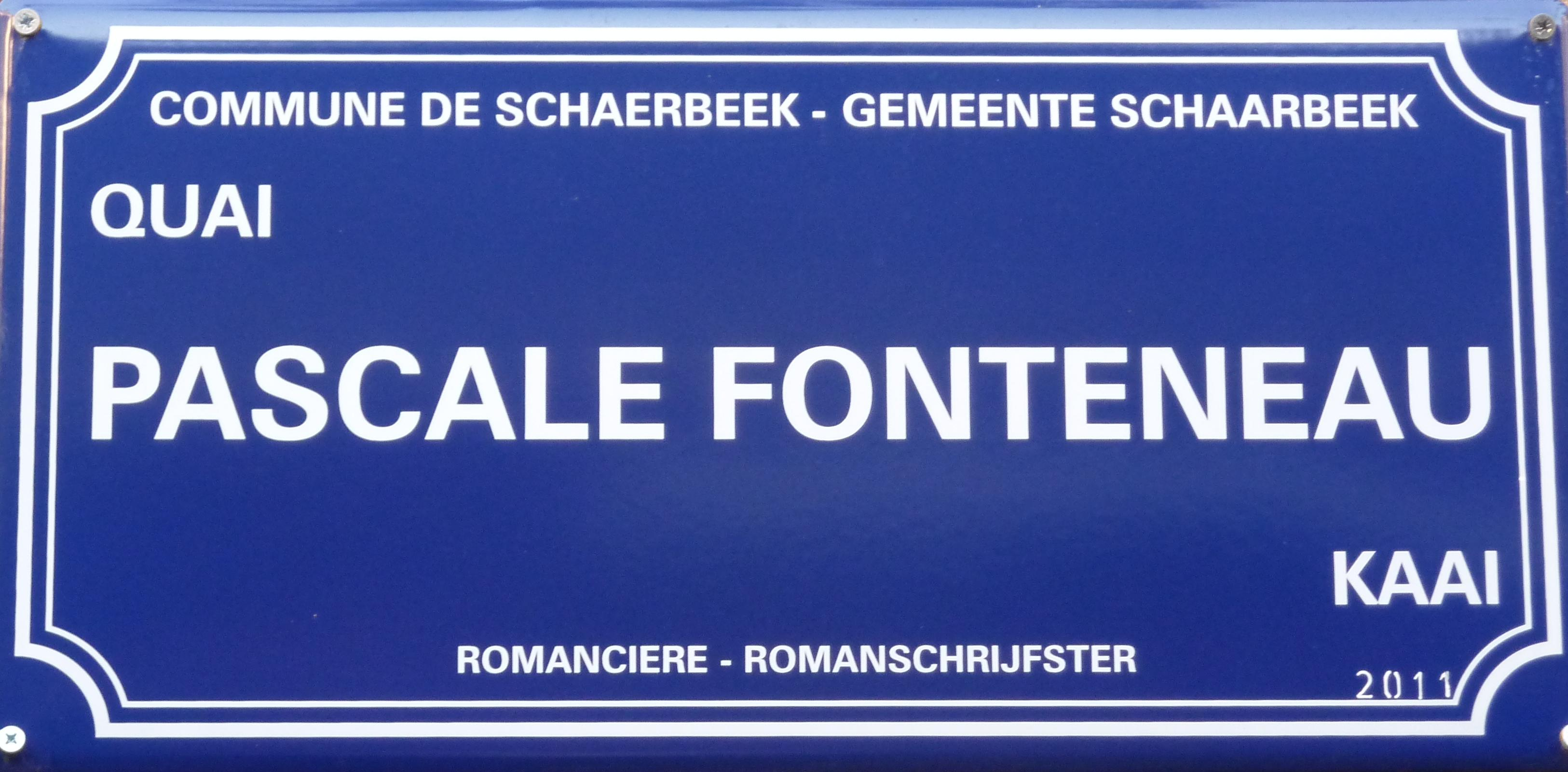

Pascale Fonteneau (born April 29, 1963) is a French-born journalist and novelist in Belgium.

The daughter of a French father and a German mother, she was born in Fougères in Brittany, was educated at the Université libre de Bruxelles and lives in Brussels.

She was one of the founding members of Passa Porta, the international house of literature in Brussels. Fonteneau has been employed in the organization of various festivals and in the management of cultural projects.

Fonteneau was one of the first female authors to be included in the Série noire crime fiction series.

== Selected works ==
=== Novels ===
- Confidences sur l’escalier Série noire (1992), also translated into Swedish and Japanese
- États de lame Série noire (1993)
- Les Fils perdus de Sylvie Derjike Série noire (1995), also translated into German
- Otto (1997)
- La Puissance du désordre (1997)
- La Vanité des pions Série noire (2000)
- TGV, Le Grand Miroir (2003)
- Crois-moi (2005)
- Jour de gloire (2006)
- Contretemps (2005)
- 1275 ares (2008)
- Propriétés privées (2010)
- L’affaire Verschuren (2019)

=== Short story collections ===
- Curieux sentiments (2000)
- Du debut à la fin (2002)
- De long en large (2006)
