= John P. Rutherfoord =

American physicist and professor

- Born: John Penn Rutherfoord; 1942 (age 83–84)
- Education: Union College; Cornell University
- Awards: US ATLAS Lifetime Achievement award; High Energy and Particle Physics Prize of the European Physical Society; Regents' Professor of Physics; Galileo Circle Dean's Award
- Scientific career
- Fields: High energy particles and fields
- Workplaces: Cornell Synchrotron Lab; Tufts University; University of Washington; University of Arizona
- Thesis: Neutral Pion Photoproduction in the Backward Direction
- Doctoral advisor: Eugene C. Loh, John William Dewire

John P. Rutherfoord (born 1942) is an American experimental particle physicist and Regents Professor at the University of Arizona. He is a known leader in ATLAS projects, having received the US ATLAS Lifetime Achievement award, as well as the High Energy and Particle Physics Prize of the European Physical Society.

== Early life and education ==
The son of John Penn Rutherfoord and Ann Elizabeth Rutherfoord (née Kincanon), John P. Rutherfoord, born in Ohio in 1942, married Robin Hinckley in Santa Clara, California, in 1975.

Rutherfoord completed a Bachelor of Science degree in physics in 1964 at Union College, in Schenectady, New York. In 1968 he earned a Ph.D. at Cornell University in physics, with his dissertation, Neutral Pion Photoproduction in the Backward Direction, advised by Eugene C. Loh and John William Dewire.

== Career ==
Rutherfoord's first post-grad work was at the Cornell Synchrotron Lab. After a year in a post-doc position at Tufts University as a research assistant, he joined the faculty there until 1976. He was subsequently hired as a research faculty member at the University of Washington and then as teaching faculty until 1988.

Rutherfoord's initial research interests in pion photoproduction in the 1970s included polarization phenomena, as well as large-angle Compton scattering. He served as deputy spokesperson for Fermilab experiments in the mid-1980s. Joining the DØ experiment, he then worked on liquid argon calorimetry and also participated in the EMPACT (Electrons Muons Partons with Air Core Toroids) and EMPACT/TEXAS collaborations. As a charter member of the GEM collaboration, he focused on a high luminosity detector using liquid argon calorimetry.

In 1988 Rutherfoord started an experimental particle physics group at the University of Arizona. His group "played a foundational role in the ATLAS experiment ("A Toroidal LHC ApparatuS") through leadership in detector design, construction, and long-term operations." In 1990 he chaired the nominating committee of the Superconducting Super Collider Users Executive Committee. He has also served on the Physics Advisory Committee and the Fermilab Users Executive Committee.

Rutherfoord has been recognized for his national leadership in high energy physics projects, such as ATLAS: "Rutherfoord led the design and construction of the ATLAS forward calorimeter and continues to support its performance through the development of correction techniques required for the high-intensity environment of future LHC runs. In addition to technical leadership, he has served as Chair of the US ATLAS Institutional Board, contributing to governance at the national level."

== Honors and awards ==
- US ATLAS Lifetime Achievement award (2023) for leading the design and development of the ATLAS Forward Calorimeter at CERN, with the citation, "John Rutherfoord has been recognized for the US ATLAS Lifetime Achievement Award due to his seminal contributions to the design and construction of the ATLAS forward calorimeter, as well as his leadership roles in US ATLAS (including serving as IB Chair) and in the ATLAS liquid argon community."
- High Energy and Particle Physics Prize of the European Physical Society (2019) "The European Physical Society has awarded its 2019 High Energy and Particle Physics Prize to the scientists involved in the discovery of the top quark, and the initial measurements of its properties... John Rutherfoord...[was] part of the DØ experiment collaboration..."
- Regents' Professor of Physics (2019) "John Rutherfoord was the principal architect of the Arizona design of the forward calorimeter, a key component of the ATLAS calorimeter system, which measures the energies of the particles coming out of these collisions. Such measurements led to the discovery of the Higgs boson, one of the most celebrated accomplishments in high-energy particle physics in recent years."
- Galileo Circle Dean's Award (2013) "[Rutherfoord] was a recipient of the first Galileo Circle Dean's Award in 2013." The award is given to distinguished faculty, "whose support is vital to the continued excellence of the University of Arizona's College of Science... who have demonstrated deep interdisciplinary understanding and a strong ability to inspire."

== Selected publications ==
- ATLAS Collaboration (2012-09-17). "Observation of a new particle in the search for the Standard Model Higgs boson with the ATLAS detector at the LHC". Physics Letters B. 716 (1). doi:10.1016/j.phy. ISSN 0370-2693. Archived from the original on 2024-12-09.
- Glatte, A.; et al. (2012). "Liquid argon calorimeter performance at high rates". Nuclear Instruments and Methods in Physics Research Section A: Accelerators, Spectrometers, Detectors and Associated Equipment. 669: 47–65. doi:10.1016/j.physletb.2012.08.020. ISSN 0168-9002.
- Archambault, J.P.; et al. (2013). "Performance of the ATLAS liquid argon forward calorimeter in beam tests". Journal of Instrumentation. 8 (published May 2013). doi:10.1088/1748-0221/8/05/P05006.
- Artamonov, A; et al. (2008-02-21). "The ATLAS Forward Calorimeter". Journal of Instrumentation. 3 (02): P02010–P02010. doi:10.1088/1748-0221/3/02/P02010. ISSN 1748-0221.
- Rutherfoord, John P. (2001). "Signal Degradation due to Charge Buildup in Noble Liquid Ionization Calorimeters" (PDF). cds.cern.
