= William Rutherford =

William Rutherford may refer to:

- Bill Rutherford, British professor of biochemistry
- Bill Rutherford (footballer), Scottish footballer
- Bill Rutherford (politician), Oregon politician
- William Gunion Rutherford (1853–1907), Scottish scholar
- William Rutherford (mathematician) (1798–1871), English mathematician
- William Rutherford (physiologist) (1839–1899), British physiologist
- Sir William Rutherford, 1st Baronet (1853–1927), British politician, MP for West Derby and Edge Hill
- Willie Rutherford (1945–2010), Australian football player

== See also ==
- William Gordon Rutherfurd (1765–1818), British naval officer
- William Rutherford Mead (1846–1928), American architect
