= Reginald Bassett =

English historian and Professor of Political Science

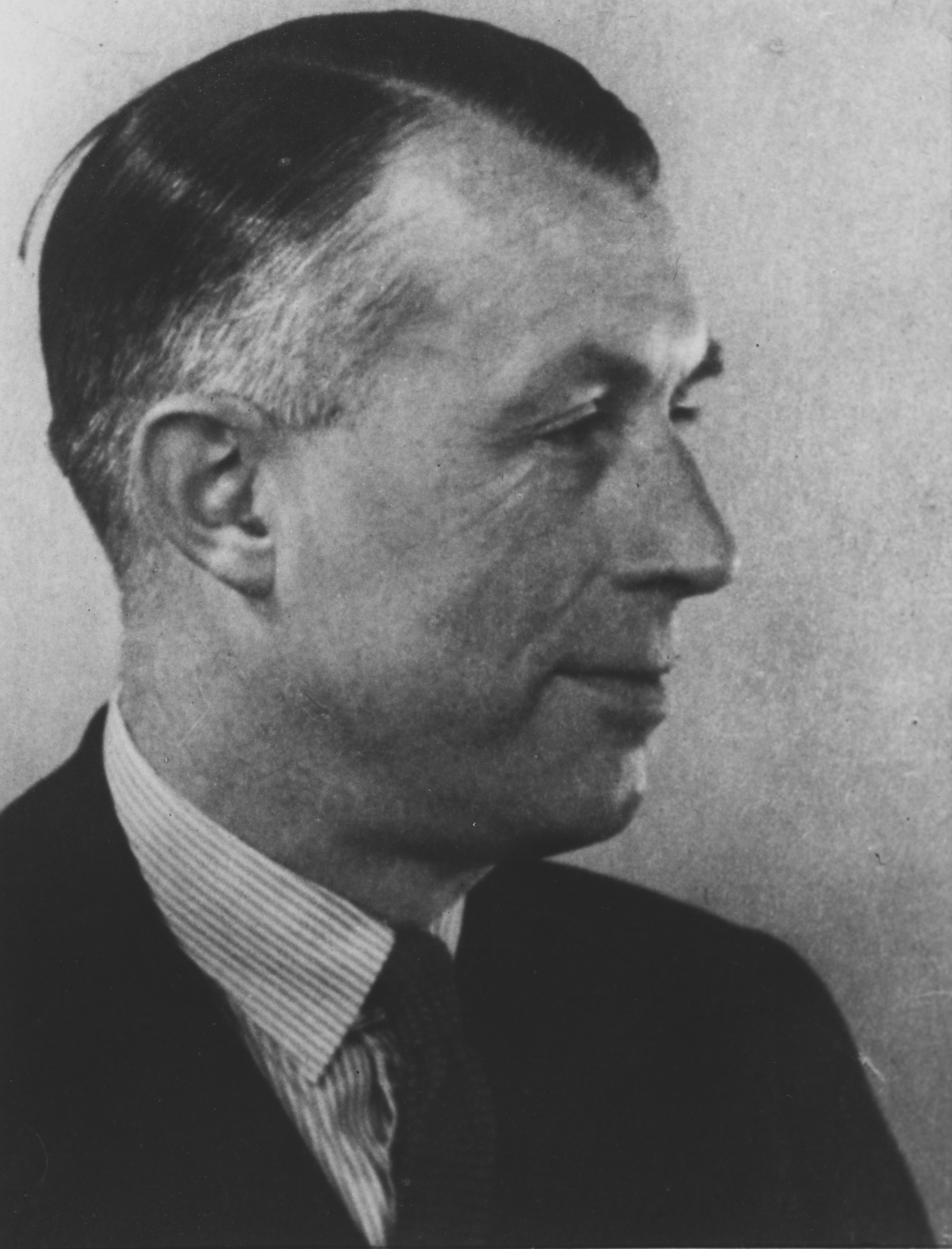
Reginald Bassett in 1950

Reginald Bassett (25 June 1901 – 9 July 1962) was an English historian and Professor of Political Science at the London School of Economics.

== Career ==
Having left school to become a solicitor's clerk, at the age of 25 Bassett won a scholarship to study for a diploma at Ruskin College, Oxford, and from there proceeded to New College, Oxford. He was a lecturer under the Extra-Mural Studies Delegacy of the University of Oxford, lecturing mainly in Sussex. From 1945–50 he was a tutor at the London School of Economics for a course designed for students from trade unions. He was lecturer in political science from 1950 to 1953, Reader in Political Science from 1953 to 1961, and Professor of Political Science from 1961 to 1962.

Bassett was a member of the Independent Labour Party. In 1931 he supported Ramsay MacDonald's decision to a form the National Government with the Conservatives and the Liberals. He later published a detailed history of the crisis of 1931, challenging the left-wing interpretation of it as a plot.

His famous 1948 article on Stanley Baldwin's "confession" of November 1936 challenged the view of Winston Churchill, who claimed in his history of the Second World War that Baldwin had admitted that an election fought on rearmament in 1935 would have been lost. Bassett proved that Baldwin was instead talking about 1933/34 when the public mood favoured disarmament, as revealed by the East Fulham by-election.

== Works ==
- The Essentials of Parliamentary Democracy (1935).
- Democracy and Foreign Policy (1952).
- Nineteen Thirty-one: Political Crisis (1958).
