= John Rutherford (Conservative politician) =

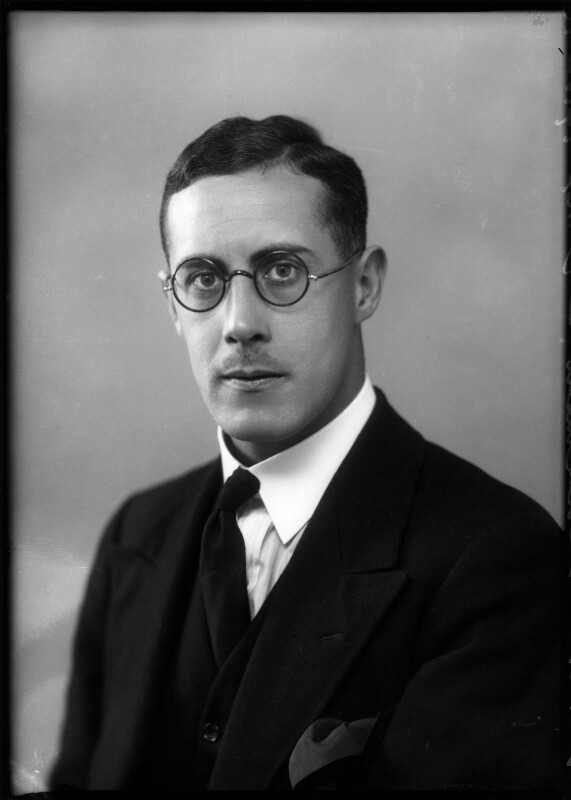
Rutherford in 1931

John Rutherford Rutherford (1904–1957) was a barrister and Conservative MP for Edmonton in London.

He was the son of Sir John Rutherford, 1st Baronet.

He was elected in the National Government landslide of 1931. He changed his surname to Rutherford in 1933, a condition for inheriting the estate of his grand-uncle, Sir John Rutherford, a brewer and race-horse owner. He lost his seat in 1935.

== Notes ==
Parliament of the United Kingdom
Preceded by Frank Broad	Member of Parliament for Edmonton; 1931–1935	Succeeded by Frank Broad
