= Theodora Fonteneau Rutherford =

African-American accountant, clubwoman and college instructor (1904–1993)

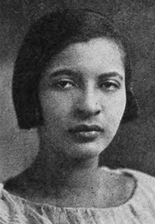
- Theodora Fonteneau Rutherford, from a 1924 publication.
- Born: Theodora Velma Fonteneau; January 28, 1904; Jeanerette, Louisiana, US
- Died: August 15, 1993 (aged 89)
- Occupation: accountant

Theodora Velma Fonteneau Rutherford (January 28, 1904 – August 15, 1993) was an African-American accountant, clubwoman, and college instructor. In 1960 she became the first black CPA qualified in West Virginia.

== Early life ==
Theodora Velma Fonteneau was born in Jeanerette, Louisiana, and raised in Houston, Texas. Her mother was a teacher, and her father owned a restaurant. In 1919 she was "Goddess of Liberty" in an Emancipation Day celebration parade in Houston.

== Education ==
She attended Howard University, graduating summa cum laude in 1923, at the top of her class i the School of Commerce and Finance. The following year, she was the first black student to earn a master's degree in accounting at Columbia University. Her thesis title was "An accounting system for a small school or college".

Fonteneau was unable to qualify as a Certified Public Accountant (CPA) after school, because she could not meet New York's experience requirement; no firm would hire a black woman accountant, even with Fonteneau's academic credentials. When there was a rule change in 1959, she became the first black CPA in West Virginia. and the first black woman member of the West Virginia Society of Public Accountants.

== Career ==
Fonteneau worked addressing envelopes in New York City while she was a graduate student. She moved to West Virginia in 1925, and built the business program at West Virginia Collegiate Institute (now West Virginia State University). Because her husband also worked for the school, she was forced by nepotism rules to leave her job during their marriage, from 1933 to 1957. She returned to teaching in widowhood. She retired from college teaching in 1973.

Rutherford helped establish the West Virginia Collegiate Credit Union, was the credit union's first treasurer, and later served on the board of directors of the West Virginia Credit Union League. She was president of the West Virginia Consumer Association and served on the boards of the Community Banking and Savings Company. She taught community classes in tax preparation. In 1963, she won a Ford Foundation fellowship, to pursue doctoral studies at Indiana University. After she retired, she ran an accounting firm, specializing in taxes. "Most older people have encouraged young black women to go into teaching, but I certainly would encourage them to go into accounting if they are capable," she told an interviewer in 1977.

Rutherford was active in the Alpha Kappa Alpha (ΑΚΑ) sorority. She was a charter member and first president of the ΑΚΑ graduate chapter at Charleston, West Virginia when it was founded in 1929. She was also active in the League of Women Voters and the Girl Scouts, and ran a summer camp for girls on the Coal River in the 1930s.

In 1983, Rutherford was honored by Howard University for her lifetime of achievement, with fellow alumni Debbie Allen, Wayman Smith III, James E. Bowman, Gloria Twine Chisum, and Robert E. L. Perkins.

== Personal life ==
Theodora Fonteneau married Charles Robert Rutherford, who also worked at West Virginia State University. She was widowed when Charles died by suicide in 1956. Her only child, Rosalie (1932–1976), was disabled in an accident as a young woman; Theodora Rutherford raised her granddaughter, Elvira Morgan (1958-1976).

== Legacy ==
The Black Business Students Association at Columbia University awards a Theodora Fonteneau Rutherford Scholarship, named for Rutherford as the business school's first black graduate.
