= John Rutherford (Australian cricketer) =

Australian cricketer (1929–2022)

Personal information
- Full name: John Walter Rutherford
- Born: 25 September 1929; Bruce Rock, Western Australia
- Died: 21 April 2022 (aged 92)
- Nickname: Pythagoras
- Batting: Right-handed
- Bowling: Right-arm leg break
- Role: Opening batsman

International information
- National side: Australia
- Only Test (cap 204): 26 October 1956 v India

Domestic team information
- Years: Team
- 1952/53–1960/61: Western Australia

Career statistics
Competition	Test	First-class
Matches	1	67
Runs scored	30	3,367
Batting average	30.00	31.76
100s/50s	0/0	6/15
Top score	30	167
Balls bowled	36	3,353
Wickets	1	29
Bowling average	15.00	45.27
5 wickets in innings	0	0
10 wickets in match	0	0
Best bowling	1/11	3/12
Catches/stumpings	0/–	53/–
- Source: ESPNcricinfo, 26 April 2022

John Walter Rutherford (25 September 1929 – 19 April 2022) was an Australian cricketer who played in one Test match in 1956. Although Ernest Bromley was the first Western Australian to play Test cricket, Rutherford was the first player from the Western Australia cricket team to be picked for a senior cricket tour and the first to win a Test cap for Australia whilst playing for his native state.

== Biography ==
Rutherford was born in Bruce Rock, Western Australia, and had his secondary education at Northam High School. A science and mathematics graduate from the University of Western Australia, Rutherford was a right-handed opening batsman, inclined to be defensive, and an occasional leg-break bowler who played for Western Australia from the 1952–53 season. Until 1956–57, Western Australia played the other Sheffield Shield state cricket teams only once a season, so Rutherford's record of five first-class centuries in his first four seasons was notable enough to win him selection for the 1956 Australian tour to England. In a damp summer, though, he scored 640 runs at an average of fewer than 23 runs per innings. Against MCC at Lord's, he scored a 98 and shared a second wicket partnership of 282 with Neil Harvey, who scored 225. When the team was announced for the first Test, however, the Australians reverted to the first-choice opening pair of Colin McDonald and Jim Burke.

On the way back to Australia from England, the team stopped in Pakistan for one Test match and in India for three games: in the second Indian match at Bombay (Mumbai), Rutherford won his solitary Test cap, replacing McDonald. He scored 30 and also took the wicket of Vijay Manjrekar, but McDonald returned for the third match and Rutherford never played Test cricket again.

Rutherford played state cricket for three more seasons, but after top-scoring in the match and achieving his career-best bowling performance for Western Australia against the 1958–59 MCC touring side, he was not selected for the Tests that season and retired at the end of it. He played as a professional with Rishton in the Lancashire League in 1959, scoring 831 runs and taking 52 wickets. In 1960 he signed for Lincolnshire club Ross Group as a professional and coach and in a game on the 5th June 1960 he scored 201 not out and took 9 for 51, catching the 10th wickets of the game. He reappeared in first-class cricket in 1960–61, when he captained the state team to victory over the visiting West Indians, but he suffered a stroke attack during the match and never played first-class cricket again.

Rutherford died on 19 April 2022, at the age of 92.
