= Parliamentary constituencies in Merseyside =

The ceremonial county of Merseyside, created in 1974, is divided into 16 parliamentary constituencies (sub-classified into 11 of borough type and five of county status affecting the level of expenses permitted and status of returning officer). Three seats cross the county boundary - two are shared with Cheshire and one with Lancashire.

The area, centred on its largest city of Liverpool, has since that year elected a majority of Labour Party MPs moreover since 1997 at least 13 of 15 seats have been held or won by the party at each general election, with the party winning all seats for the first time in 2024. The two other largest parties nationally in England (Conservatives and Liberal Democrats) have to date won intermittently in the two larger seats within the four in the Wirral, the peninsula facing Liverpool, and, until 2024, had alternately represented the seat centred on the coastal strip in and around the leisure resort of Southport; it had not previously sided with the Labour Party since it was created in 1885. The bulk of seats especially towards the east and the centre of Liverpool have not sided with the Conservative Party since that party actively supported the National Labour Organisation (1931–1947).

== Constituencies ==
† Conservative ¥ Green ‡ Labour ¤ Reform UK

Constituency (Note: BC denotes borough constituency, CC denotes county constituency.)	Electorate	Majority (Note: The majority is the number of votes the winning candidate receives more than their nearest rival.)	Member of Parliament	Nearest opposition	Map
Birkenhead BC	78,091	13,798	Alison McGovern‡	Jo Bird¥	
Bootle BC	73,037	21,983	Peter Dowd‡	Darren Burns¤	
Ellesmere Port and Bromborough BC (Note: Cross-county constituency with Cheshire)	70,799	16,908	Justin Madders‡	Michael Aldred¤	
Knowsley BC	71,964	18,319	Anneliese Midgley‡	Alexander Hitchmough¤	
Liverpool Garston BC	69,282	20,104	Maria Eagle‡	Kiera Hubbard¤	
Liverpool Riverside BC	71,380	14,793	Kim Johnson‡	Chris Coughlan¥	
Liverpool Walton BC	69,317	20,245	Dan Carden‡	Joe Doran¤	
Liverpool Wavertree BC	70,581	16,304	Paula Barker‡	Tom Crone¥	
Liverpool West Derby BC	69,934	20,423	Ian Byrne‡	Jack Boyd¤	
Sefton Central CC	74,282	18,282	Bill Esterson‡	Marcus Bleasdale†	
Southport CC (Note: Cross-county constituency with Lancashire)	73,641	5,789	Patrick Hurley‡	Damien Moore†	
St Helens North CC	75,483	12,169	David Baines‡	Malcolm Webster¤	
St Helens South and Whiston BC	71,569	11,945	Marie Rimmer‡	Raymond Peters¤	
Wallasey BC	74,082	17,996	Angela Eagle‡	David Burgess-Joyce¤	
Widnes and Halewood CC (Note: Cross-county constituency with Cheshire)	70,161	16,425	Derek Twigg‡	Jake Fraser¤	
Wirral West CC	72,838	9,998	Matthew Patrick‡	Jenny Johnson†	

== Boundary changes ==
=== 2024 ===
See 2023 review of Westminster constituencies for further details.

For the 2023 review of Westminster constituencies, which redrew the constituency map ahead of the 2024 United Kingdom general election, the Boundary Commission for England opted to combine Merseyside with Cheshire as a sub-region of the North West Region, with the creation of two cross-county boundary constituencies of Ellesmere Port and Bromborough, and Widnes and Halewood, which avoids the need for a constituency which spans the River Mersey. As a consequence, Garston and Halewood was abolished and Liverpool Garston re-established, and Wirral South was abolished, with its contents being redistributed to Birkenhead, Ellesmere Port and Bromborough, and Wirral West. Four wards in the Lancashire borough of West Lancashire were included in Southport.

Name (2010–2024)	Boundaries 2010-2024	Name (2024–present)	Boundaries 2024–present
1. Birkenhead BC; 2. Bootle BC; 3. Garston and Halewood BC; 4. Knowsley BC; 5. Liverpool, Riverside BC; 6. Liverpool, Walton BC; 7. Liverpool, Wavertree BC; 8. Liverpool, West Derby BC; 9. Sefton Central CC; 10. Southport BC; 11. St Helens North BC; 12. St Helens South and Whiston BC; 13. Wallasey BC; 14. Wirral South CC; 15. Wirral West CC	Parliamentary constituencies in Merseyside (2010–2024)	1. Birkenhead BC; 2. Bootle BC; 3. Ellesmere Port and Bromborough BC; 4. Knowsley BC; 5. Liverpool Garston BC; 6. Liverpool Riverside BC; 7. Liverpool Walton BC; 8. Liverpool Wavertree BC; 9. Liverpool West Derby BC; 10. Sefton Central CC; 11. Southport CC; 12. St Helens North CC; 13. St Helens South and Whiston BC; 14. Wallasey BC; 15. Widnes and Halewood CC; 16. Wirral West CC	Parliamentary constituencies in Merseyside (2024-present)

The following constituencies resulted from the boundary review:

Containing electoral wards from Knowsley

- Knowsley
- Liverpool West Derby (part)
- St Helens South and Whiston (part)
- Widnes and Halewood (part also in Cheshire West and Chester)

Containing electoral wards from Liverpool

- Liverpool Garston
- Liverpool Riverside
- Liverpool Walton (part)
- Liverpool Wavertree
- Liverpool West Derby (part)

Containing electoral wards from St Helens

- St Helens North
- St Helens South and Whiston (part)

Containing electoral wards from Sefton

- Bootle
- Liverpool Walton (part)
- Sefton Central
- Southport (part also in West Lancashire)

Containing electoral wards from Wirral

- Birkenhead
- Ellesmere Port and Bromborough (part also in Cheshire West and Chester)
- Wallasey
- Wirral West

=== 2010 ===
Under the fifth periodic review of Westminster constituencies, the Boundary Commission for England decided to reduce the number of seats in Merseyside from 16 to 15, leading to significant changes. The two Knowsley seats were abolished, with a single Knowsley constituency created. Parts of Knowsley North and Sefton East were added to the new constituency of Sefton Central, which replaced Crosby, and parts of Knowsley South were added to the new constituency of Garston and Halewood, which replaced Liverpool, Garston.

Name (1997–2010)	Boundaries 1997-2010	Name (2010–2024)	Boundaries 2010–2024
1. Birkenhead BC; 2. Bootle BC; 3. Crosby BC; 4. Knowsley North and Sefton East CC; 5. Knowsley South CC; 6. Liverpool, Garston BC; 7. Liverpool, Riverside BC; 8. Liverpool, Walton BC; 9. Liverpool, Wavertree BC; 10. Liverpool, West Derby BC; 11. St Helens North BC; 12. St Helens South BC; 13. Southport BC; 14. Wallasey BC; 15. Wirral South CC; 16. Wirral West CC	Parliamentary constituencies in Merseyside (1997–2010)	1. Birkenhead BC; 2. Bootle BC; 3. Garston and Halewood BC; 4. Knowsley BC; 5. Liverpool, Riverside BC; 6. Liverpool, Walton BC; 7. Liverpool, Wavertree BC; 8. Liverpool, West Derby BC; 9. Sefton Central CC; 10. Southport BC; 11. St Helens North BC; 12. St Helens South and Whiston BC; 13. Wallasey BC; 14. Wirral South CC; 15. Wirral West CC	Parliamentary constituencies in Merseyside (2010–2024)

== Results history ==
Primary data source: House of Commons research briefing - General election results from 1918 to 2019

=== 2024 ===
The number of votes cast for each political party who fielded candidates in constituencies comprising Merseyside in the 2024 general election were as follows: (Note: Merseyside has three cross-county constituencies. Southport as an electorate predominantly within Merseyside, and so included within the below vote shares. Ellesmere Port and Bromsborough and Widnes and Halewood have majority electorates within Cheshire, and are hence excluded from the vote share)

Party	Votes	%	Change from 2019	Seats	Change from 2019
Labour	324,457	56.8%	▼8.4%	16	▲2
Reform	80,961	14.2%	▲9.5	0	0
Conservative	60,903	10.7%	▼9.5%	0	▼1
Greens	54,871	9.6%	▲6.9%	0	0
Liberal Democrats	31,982	5.6%	0	0	0
Others	17,681	3.1%	▲1.5	0	0
Total	570,855	100.0		16	

=== Percentage votes ===
Election year	1983	1987	1992	1997	2001	2005	2010	2015	2017	2019	2024
Labour	39.9	47.4	51.4	61.9	58.7	53.8	52.3	61.7	71.2	65.2	56.8
Reform	-	-	-	-	-	-	-	-	-	4.7	14.2
Conservative	35.0	28.9	29.0	19.7	20.1	19.4	21.1	18.1	21.4	20.2	10.7
Green Party	-	*	*	*	*	*	0.3	3.6	1.5	2.7	9.6
Liberal Democrat^{1}	23.7	23.3	16.9	14.4	17.8	22.9	20.8	5.5	4.3	5.6	5.6
UKIP	-	-	-	*	*	*	3.2	10.3	1.1	*	*
Other	1.4	0.3	2.7	3.9	3.4	3.9	2.2	0.8	0.5	1.6	3.1

^{1}1983 & 1987 - SDP–Liberal Alliance

* Included in Other

=== Seats ===
Election year	1983	1987	1992	1997	2001	2005	2010	2015	2017	2019	2024
Labour	11	11	12	15	15	15	13	14	14	14	16
Conservative	5	4	4	0	0	0	1	0	1	1	0
Liberal Democrat^{1}	1	2	1	1	1	1	1	1	0	0	0
Total	17	17	17	16	16	16	15	15	15	15	16

^{1}1983 & 1987 - SDP–Liberal Alliance

=== Maps ===
==== 1983 to 2019 ====
1983

1987

1992

1997

2001

2005

2010

2015

2017

2019

==== 2024 to present (including three cross-county constituencies) ====
2024

== Historic representation by party ==
A cell marked → (with a different colour background to the preceding cell) indicates that the previous MP continued to sit under a new party name.

=== 1983 to 2010 ===
Conservative Independent Labour Liberal Liberal Democrats

Constituency	1983	86	1987	88	90	90	91	1992	97	1997	2001	2005	07
Liverpool Mossley Hill	Alton			→									
Birkenhead	Field												
Bootle	Roberts				Carr	Benton							
Crosby	Thornton									Curtis-Thomas			
Knowsley N / Knowsley N & Sefton E (1997)	Kilroy-Silk	Howarth											
Knowsley South	Hughes				O'Hara								
Liverpool Garston	Loyden									M. Eagle			
Liverpool Broadgreen / Liverpool Wavertree (1997)	Fields							Kennedy					
Liverpool Riverside	Parry									Ellman			
Liverpool Walton	Heffer						Kilfoyle						
Liverpool West Derby	Wareing												→
Southport	Percival		Fearn	→				Banks		Fearn	Pugh		
St Helens North	Evans									Watts			
St Helens South	Bermingham										Woodward		
Wallasey	Chalker							A. Eagle					
Wirral South	Porter								Chapman				
Wirral West	Hunt									Hesford			

=== 2010 to present ===
Birkenhead Social Justice Change UK Conservative Independent Labour Liberal Democrats

Constituency	2010	2015	2017	18	19	19	2019	22	2024
Birkenhead	Field			→		→	Whitley		McGovern
Bootle	Benton	Dowd							
Knowsley	Howarth								Midgley
Garston & Halewood^{1} / Liverpool Garston (2024)	M. Eagle								
Liverpool Riverside	Ellman					→	Johnson		
Liverpool Walton	Rotheram		Carden						
Liverpool Wavertree	Berger				→	→	Barker		
Liverpool West Derby	Twigg						Byrne		
St Helens North	Watts	McGinn						→	Baines
St Helens South & Whiston	Woodward	Rimmer							
Sefton Central	Esterson								
Southport^{2}	Pugh		Moore						Hurley
Wallasey	A. Eagle								
Wirral South^{1}	McGovern								N/A
Wirral West	McVey	Greenwood							Patrick

^{1}parts transferred in 2024 to seats which lie mostly in Cheshire

^{2}contains some areas of Lancashire

== See also ==
- List of parliamentary constituencies in the North West (region)
- List of United Kingdom Parliament constituencies
