= List of MPs who stood down at the 2024 United Kingdom general election =

MPs standing down at the 2024 UK general election

This is a list of members of Parliament (MPs) who held seats at the end of the 58th Parliament of the United Kingdom and did not stand for re-election in the 2024 general election. A total of 132 Members of Parliament did not stand for re-election, including a record number of Conservative MPs. This includes MPs who were deselected by their party who subsequently chose not to seek nomination either in a different constituency, or with a different party.

Four MPs — Nadine Dorries, Nigel Adams, Chris Skidmore (all Conservative) and Chris Pincher (independent, elected as Conservative) — announced their intention not to stand again, but later resigned from Parliament before the election, and are not included in the figures below.

Five further MPs – Conservatives Andy Carter, Chris Clarkson, Kieran Mullan and Douglas Ross and Independent Julian Knight (Note: Elected as Conservative.) – initially announced their intention to stand down, before changing their minds. Carter stood in his existing constituency of Warrington South while the others stood in different constituencies. All except Mullan were subsequently defeated.

There were no vacant seats at the dissolution of the 2019–2024 Parliament. The deadline for nominations of candidates was at 16:00 BST on 7 June 2024.

Number of MPs standing down by party affiliation
Party	MPs standing down	
Party	Elected (Note: Party affiliation of retiring MPs at the time of the 2019 general election.)	Final
Conservative	80	75
Labour	35	33
SNP	10	9
Sinn Féin	3	3
Plaid Cymru	2	1
Green	1	1
DUP	1	0
Independent (Note: Elected: 4 as Conservative; 4 as Labour; 1 as Plaid Cymru; 1 as DUP.)	0	10
Total	132	

Members of Parliament not standing for re-election
MP	Seat	First elected	Party	Date announced
Alex Cunningham	Stockton North	2010	Labour	25 November 2021
Margaret Hodge	Barking	1994	Labour	2 December 2021
Barry Sheerman	Huddersfield	1979 (Note: Originally elected as the MP for Huddersfield East.)	Labour	4 December 2021
Harriet Harman	Camberwell and Peckham	1982 (Note: Originally elected as the MP for Peckham in the 1982 by-election.)	Labour	7 December 2021
Alan Whitehead	Southampton Test	1997	Labour	14 January 2022
Charles Walker	Broxbourne	2005	Conservative	1 February 2022
Ben Bradshaw	Exeter	1997	Labour	3 February 2022
Wayne David	Caerphilly	2001	Labour	11 February 2022
Paul Blomfield	Sheffield Central	2010	Labour	21 February 2022
Rosie Winterton	Doncaster Central	1997	Labour	27 February 2022
Margaret Beckett	Derby South	1974 (Note: Originally elected as the MP for Lincoln in the October 1974 general election but lost her seat in the 1979 general election; elected for Derby South at the 1983 general election.)	Labour	25 March 2022
Crispin Blunt	Reigate	1997	Independent	1 May 2022
Mike Penning	Hemel Hempstead	2005	Conservative	17 May 2022
Adam Afriyie	Windsor	2005	Conservative	22 July 2022
Jon Cruddas	Dagenham and Rainham	2001	Labour	28 July 2022
Colleen Fletcher	Coventry North East	2015	Labour	5 September 2022
Andrew Percy	Brigg and Goole	2010	Conservative	8 November 2022
Hywel Williams	Arfon	2001	Plaid Cymru	11 November 2022
Chloe Smith	Norwich North	2009	Conservative	22 November 2022
William Wragg	Hazel Grove	2015	Independent	22 November 2022
Gary Streeter	South West Devon	1992 (Note: Originally elected as the MP for Plymouth Sutton.)	Conservative	25 November 2022
Dehenna Davison	Bishop Auckland	2019	Conservative	25 November 2022
Sajid Javid	Bromsgrove	2010	Conservative	2 December 2022
Mark Pawsey	Rugby	2010	Conservative	5 December 2022
Matt Hancock	West Suffolk	2010	Conservative	7 December 2022
George Eustice	Camborne and Redruth	2010	Conservative	18 January 2023
Edward Timpson	Eddisbury	2008 (Note: Originally elected as the MP for Crewe and Nantwich in the 2008 by-election but lost his seat in the 2017 general election; elected for Eddisbury at the 2019 general election.)	Conservative	1 February 2023
Jo Gideon	Stoke-on-Trent Central	2019	Conservative	9 February 2023
Paul Beresford	Mole Valley	1992 (Note: Originally elected as the MP for Croydon Central.)	Conservative	13 February 2023
Stephen McPartland	Stevenage	2010	Conservative	13 February 2023
Robin Walker	Worcester	2010	Conservative	3 March 2023
Graham Brady	Altrincham and Sale West	1997	Conservative	7 March 2023
Pauline Latham	Mid Derbyshire	2010	Conservative	9 March 2023
Gordon Henderson	Sittingbourne and Sheppey	2010	Conservative	17 March 2023
Craig Whittaker	Calder Valley	2010	Conservative	21 March 2023
Nicola Richards	West Bromwich East	2019	Conservative	28 March 2023
Henry Smith	Crawley	2010	Conservative	31 March 2023
John Howell	Henley	2008	Conservative	11 April 2023
Robert Goodwill	Scarborough and Whitby	2005	Conservative	13 April 2023
Jonathan Djanogly	Huntingdon	2001	Conservative	21 April 2023
Matthew Offord	Hendon	2010	Conservative	2 May 2023
Conor McGinn	St Helens North	2015	Independent (Note: Elected as Labour.)	5 May 2023
Alister Jack	Dumfries and Galloway	2017	Conservative	17 May 2023
Richard Bacon	South Norfolk	2001	Conservative	19 May 2023
Dominic Raab	Esher and Walton	2010	Conservative	22 May 2023
Philip Dunne	Ludlow	2005	Conservative	22 May 2023
Margaret Greenwood	Wirral West	2015	Labour	23 May 2023
George Howarth	Knowsley	1986 (Note: Originally elected as the MP for Knowsley North in the 1986 by-election.)	Labour	5 June 2023
Ian Blackford	Ross, Skye and Lochaber	2015	SNP	6 June 2023
Caroline Lucas	Brighton Pavilion	2010	Green Party	8 June 2023
Will Quince	Colchester	2015	Conservative	9 June 2023
Royston Smith	Southampton Itchen	2015	Conservative	9 June 2023
Bill Cash	Stone	1984 (Note: Originally elected as the MP for Stafford in a by-election in 1984.)	Conservative	10 June 2023
Lucy Allan	Telford	2015	Independent	15 June 2023
Peter Grant	Glenrothes	2015	SNP	21 June 2023
Angela Crawley	Lanark and Hamilton East	2015	SNP	23 June 2023
Steve Brine	Winchester	2010	Conservative	23 June 2023
Douglas Chapman	Dunfermline and West Fife	2015	SNP	26 June 2023
Greg Knight	East Yorkshire	1983 (Note: Originally elected as the MP for Derby North in the 1983 general election but lost his seat in the 1997 general election; elected for East Yorkshire at the 2001 general election.)	Conservative	27 June 2023
Stewart Hosie	Dundee East	2005	SNP	28 June 2023
Mhairi Black	Paisley and Renfrewshire South	2015	SNP	4 July 2023
John McNally	Falkirk	2015	SNP	10 July 2023
Ben Wallace	Wyre and Preston North	2005 (Note: Originally elected as the MP for Lancaster and Wyre.)	Conservative	15 July 2023
Philippa Whitford	Central Ayrshire	2015	SNP	18 July 2023
Trudy Harrison	Copeland	2017	Conservative	24 July 2023
Stephen Hammond	Wimbledon	2005	Conservative	14 September 2023
David Jones	Clwyd West	2005	Conservative	20 September 2023
Alok Sharma	Reading West	2010	Conservative	26 September 2023
Chris Grayling	Epsom and Ewell	2001	Conservative	6 October 2023
Lisa Cameron	East Kilbride, Strathaven and Lesmahagow	2015	Conservative (Note: Elected as SNP.)	17 October 2023
Jamie Wallis	Bridgend	2019	Conservative	22 October 2023
John Baron	Basildon and Billericay	2001 (Note: Originally elected as the MP for Billericay.)	Conservative	25 October 2023
Patrick Grady	Glasgow North	2015	SNP	7 November 2023
Nick Gibb	Bognor Regis and Littlehampton	1997	Conservative	13 November 2023
Bob Stewart	Beckenham	2010	Conservative	18 November 2023
James Duddridge	Rochford and Southend East	2005	Conservative	20 November 2023
Nick Brown	Newcastle upon Tyne East	1983	Independent	12 December 2023
Karen Buck	Westminster North	1997 (Note: Originally elected as the MP for Regent's Park and Kensington North.)	Labour	19 January 2024
Oliver Heald	North East Hertfordshire	1992 (Note: Originally elected as the MP for North Hertfordshire.)	Conservative	22 January 2024
Mike Freer	Finchley and Golders Green	2010	Conservative	31 January 2024
Christina Rees	Neath	2015	Labour	1 February 2024
Bob Neill	Bromley and Chislehurst	2006	Conservative	1 February 2024
Kwasi Kwarteng	Spelthorne	2010	Conservative	6 February 2024
Nickie Aiken	Cities of London and Westminster	2019	Conservative	7 February 2024
Tracey Crouch	Chatham and Aylesford	2010	Conservative	12 February 2024
Francie Molloy	Mid Ulster	2013	Sinn Féin	13 February 2024
Mickey Brady	Newry and Armagh	2015	Sinn Féin	19 February 2024
Ian Mearns	Gateshead	2010	Labour	21 February 2024
Paul Scully	Sutton and Cheam	2015	Conservative	4 March 2024
Theresa May	Maidenhead	1997	Conservative	8 March 2024
Brandon Lewis	Great Yarmouth	2010	Conservative	14 March 2024
James Heappey	Wells	2015	Conservative	15 March 2024
Robert Halfon	Harlow	2010	Conservative	26 March 2024
Tim Loughton	East Worthing and Shoreham	1997	Conservative	13 April 2024
Mark Menzies	Fylde	2010	Independent	21 April 2024
Dan Poulter	Central Suffolk and North Ipswich	2010	Labour	27 April 2024
Natalie Elphicke	Dover	2019	Labour	8 May 2024
Nadhim Zahawi	Stratford-on-Avon	2010	Conservative	9 May 2024
Chris Heaton-Harris	Daventry	2010	Conservative	18 May 2024
Jeffrey Donaldson	Lagan Valley	1997	Independent (Note: Elected as DUP.)	22 May 2024
Holly Lynch	Halifax	2015	Labour	22 May 2024
Yvonne Fovargue	Makerfield	2010	Labour	22 May 2024
James Grundy	Leigh	2019	Conservative	22 May 2024
Jo Churchill	Bury St Edmunds	2015	Conservative	23 May 2024
Eleanor Laing	Epping Forest	1997	Conservative	23 May 2024
Michelle Gildernew	Fermanagh and South Tyrone	2001 (Note: Originally elected in 2001 but lost her seat in the 2015 general election; elected for the same constituency at the 2017 general election.)	Sinn Féin	23 May 2024
Huw Merriman	Bexhill and Battle	2015	Conservative	23 May 2024
Kevan Jones	North Durham	2001	Labour	23 May 2024
Michael Ellis	Northampton North	2010	Conservative	23 May 2024
John Redwood	Wokingham	1987	Conservative	24 May 2024
Craig Mackinlay	South Thanet	2015	Conservative	24 May 2024
Greg Clark	Tunbridge Wells	2005	Conservative	24 May 2024
David Evennett	Bexleyheath and Crayford	1983 (Note: Originally elected as the MP for Erith and Crayford in the 1983 general election, but lost his seat in the 1997 general election; elected for Bexleyheath and Crayford at the 2005 general election.)	Conservative	24 May 2024
Michael Gove	Surrey Heath	2005	Conservative	24 May 2024
Andrea Leadsom	South Northamptonshire	2010	Conservative	24 May 2024
Barbara Keeley	Worsley and Eccles South	2005	Labour	27 May 2024
John Spellar	Warley	1982 (Note: Originally elected as the MP for Birmingham Northfield in the 1982 by-election, but lost his seat in the 1983 general election; elected for Warley West at the 1992 general election. Spellar became MP for the successor constituency of Warley at the 1997 general election.)	Labour	27 May 2024
Virendra Sharma	Ealing Southall	2007	Labour	27 May 2024
Kevin Brennan	Cardiff West	2001	Labour	27 May 2024
John Cryer	Leyton and Wanstead	1997 (Note: Originally elected as the MP for Hornchurch in the 1997 general election, but lost his seat in the 2005 general election; elected for Leyton and Wanstead at the 2010 general election.)	Labour	27 May 2024
Julie Elliott	Sunderland Central	2010	Labour	28 May 2024
Lyn Brown	West Ham	2005	Labour	28 May 2024
Jonathan Edwards	Carmarthen East and Dinefwr	2010	Independent (Note: Elected as Plaid Cymru.)	28 May 2024
Geraint Davies	Swansea West	1997 (Note: Originally elected as the MP for Croydon Central in the 1997 general election, but lost his seat in the 2005 general election; elected for Swansea West at the 2010 general election.)	Independent	28 May 2024
Steve McCabe	Birmingham Selly Oak	1997	Labour	28 May 2024
Lloyd Russell-Moyle	Brighton Kemptown	2017	Independent	29 May 2024 (Note: Deselected.)
Mark Logan	Bolton North East	2019	Conservative (Note: Logan simultaneously announced his defection to the Labour Party, but remained a Conservative at dissolution and therefore never sat as a Labour MP.)	30 May 2024
Aaron Bell	Newcastle-under-Lyme	2019	Conservative	31 May 2024
Mick Whitley	Birkenhead	2019	Labour	31 May 2024
David Duguid	Banff and Buchan	2017	Conservative	5 June 2024
Sam Tarry	Ilford South	2019	Labour	7 June 2024
Beth Winter	Cynon Valley	2019	Labour	7 June 2024
