= Knowsley =

Knowsley can refer to:

== United Kingdom ==
=== Administrative divisions ===
- Knowsley (UK Parliament constituency), current parliamentary constituency
- Knowsley North and Sefton East (UK Parliament constituency), former parliamentary constituency (1997–2010)
- Knowsley North (UK Parliament constituency), former parliamentary constituency (1983–1997)
- Knowsley South (UK Parliament constituency), former parliamentary constituency (1983–2010)
- Metropolitan Borough of Knowsley, local government district

=== Other uses ===
- Knowsley, Merseyside, a large village and civil parish on the outskirts of Liverpool, within the Metropolitan Borough of Knowsley
- Knowsley Community College, a further education college based over three sites in the Metropolitan Borough of Knowsley
- Knowsley Hall, a stately home in the Metropolitan Borough of Knowsley
  - Knowsley Safari Park, a wildlife park near Prescot, situated around Knowsley Hall
- Knowsley Road, former home stadium of St Helens RFC (rugby league), in Eccleston, St Helens, Merseyside

== Other countries ==
- Knowsley, Victoria, Australia, a locality in the City of Greater Bendigo

== See also ==
- Knowles (disambiguation)
