= 1986 Knowsley North by-election =

UK by-election

- 13 November 1986

Constituency of Knowsley North
- Turnout: 57.3% (▼12.2%)
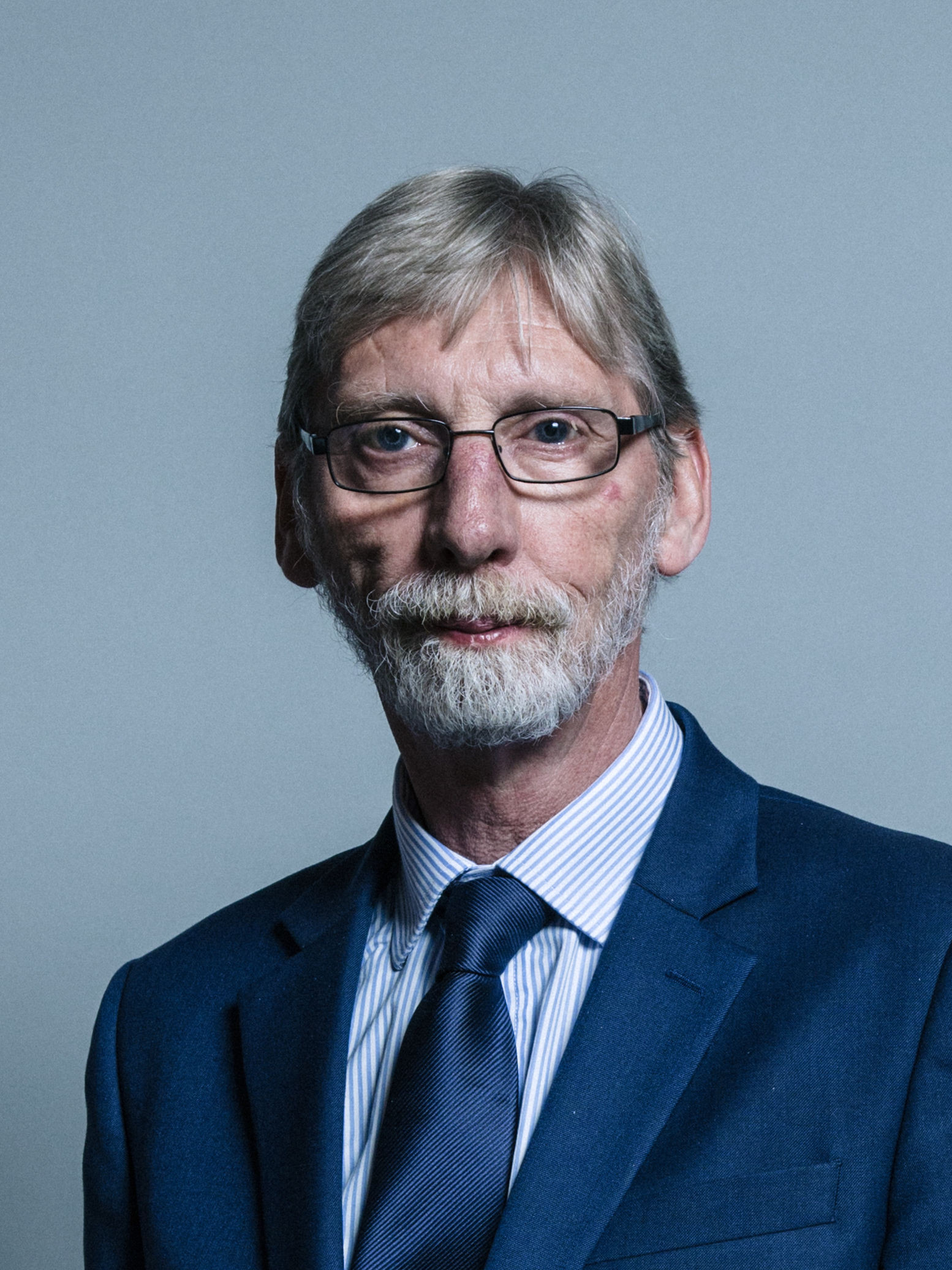

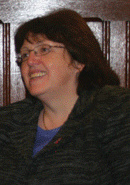
	First party	Second party	Third party
			Con
Candidate	George Howarth	Rosie Cooper	Roger Brown
Party	Labour	Liberal	Conservative
Popular vote	17,403	10,679	1,960
Percentage	56.3%	34.6%	6.3%
Swing	▼8.2%	▲19.8%	▼13.8%
MP before election
Robert Kilroy-Silk
Labour
Subsequent MP
George Howarth
Labour

The 1986 Knowsley North by-election was a parliamentary by-election held on 13 November 1986 for the British House of Commons constituency of Knowsley North.

The Labour Party retained the seat with just over half of the votes, while the SDP–Liberal Alliance surged to achieve more than a third of the vote. The constituency had some of the highest levels of unemployment in the United Kingdom.

There was a 14% swing from Labour to the Alliance, continuing a trend in by-elections, with the local Militant tendency harming the Labour vote in by-elections on Merseyside (see especially Liverpool Walton).

== Previous MP ==
The seat had become vacant on 1 October 1986. The constituency's Labour Member of Parliament (MP), Robert Kilroy-Silk, resigned his seat to pursue a media career. He did this by being appointed Steward of the Manor of Northstead, a notional office of profit under the Crown, which is used to permit MPs to vacate their seats.

Kilroy-Silk had been an MP since the February 1974 general election, originally sitting for Ormskirk. That seat disappeared in a redistribution, and he moved to the new constituency of Knowsley North in 1983.

He returned to politics in 2004, becoming a Member of the European Parliament (MEP) for the East Midlands, initially representing the United Kingdom Independence Party.

== Candidates ==
Six candidates were nominated. The list below is set out in descending order of the number of votes received at the by-election.

1. Representing the Labour Party was George Howarth. He was Chief Executive of the Wales Trades Union Congress Centre in Cardiff, and had been deputy leader of Knowsley Metropolitan Borough Council from 1982 to 1983.

He has been a Labour Member of Parliament since the 1986 by-election, originally for Knowsley North until 1997, then for its replacement Knowsley North and Sefton East, and since 2010 for Knowsley.

2. The Liberal Party candidate, representing the SDP–Liberal Alliance, was Rosie Cooper. She had been a member of Liverpool City Council since 1973, and worked as a junior executive at Littlewoods. Cooper had contested the seat of Liverpool Garston at the 1983 general election. She represented West Lancashire from 2005 to 2022, having joined the Labour Party in 1999.

3. The Conservative candidate was Roger Brown, a barrister born in 1951. He was a member of Bury Metropolitan Borough Council from 1982 until 1986.

4. David Hallsworth stood for election as a candidate of the Revolutionary Communist Party led by Frank Furedi.

5. George Weiss, a frequent election candidate, was an independent using the ballot paper label "Rainbow Alliance Captain Rainbows Universal Party".

6. Robert Cory was an independent candidate.

== Result ==
1986 by-election: Knowsley North
Party	Candidate	Votes	%	±%
Labour	George Howarth	17,403	56.3	−8.2
Alliance (Liberal)	Rosie Cooper	10,679	34.6	+19.8 ^{a}
Conservative	Roger Brown	1,960	6.3	−13.8
Revolutionary Communist	David Hallsworth	664	2.1	N/A
Rainbow Dream Ticket	George Weiss	111	0.4	New
Independent	Robert Cory	88	0.3	New
Majority		6,724	21.7	−22.7
Turnout		30,905	57.3	−12.2
Labour hold		Swing	-14.0	
Registered electors		53,921		

Note ^{a} Change is calculated from the SDP candidate who represented the SDP–Liberal Alliance at the 1983 general election.

== See also ==
- Lists of United Kingdom by-elections
- United Kingdom by-election records

== Sources ==
- Britain Votes/Europe Votes By-Election Supplement 1983-, compiled and edited by F.W.S. Craig (Parliamentary Research Services 1985)
