= Rishi Sunak as Leader of the Conservative Party =

Leader of the Conservative Party from 2022 to 2024

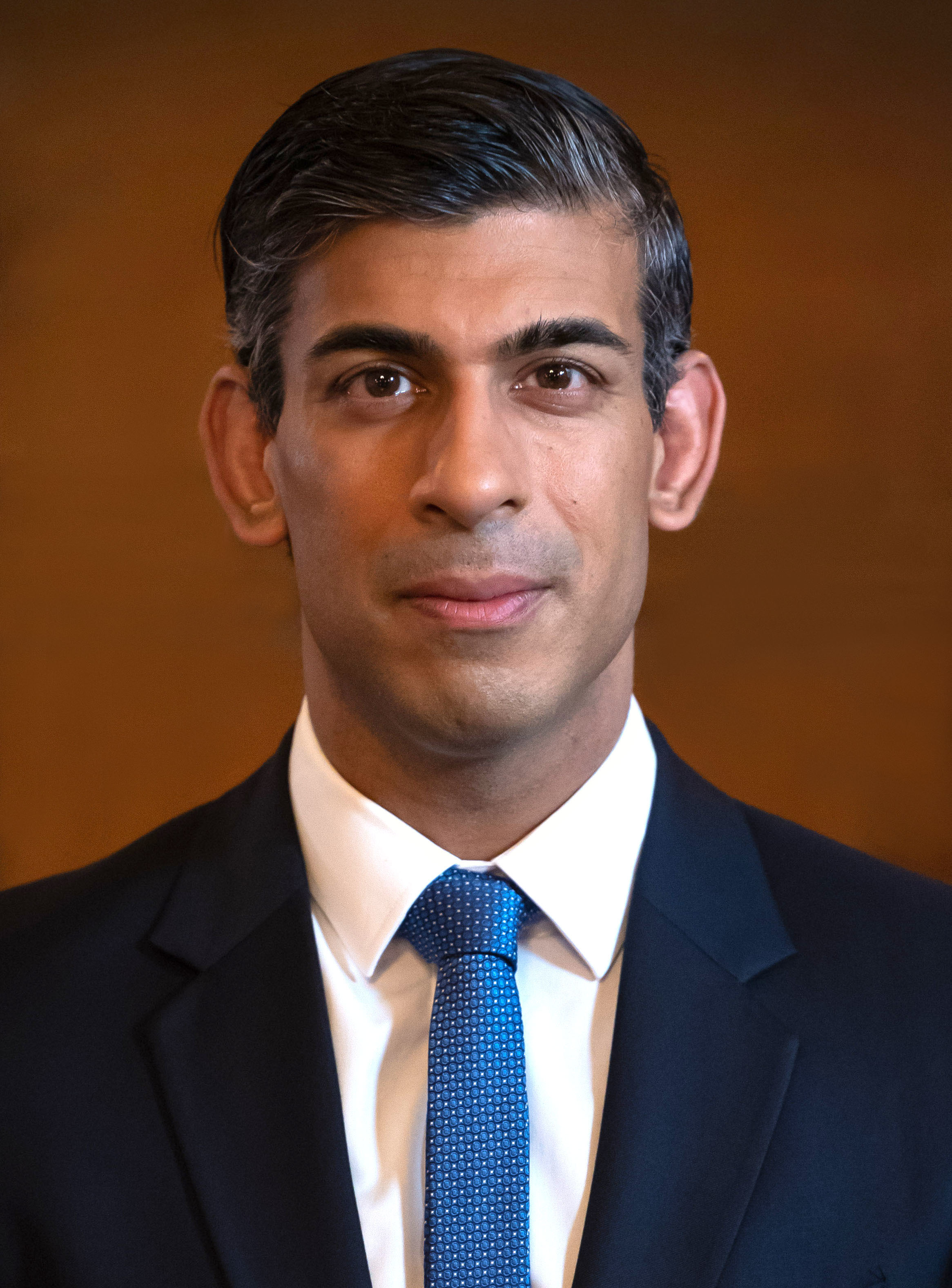
- Official portrait, 2022
- Rishi Sunak as Leader of the Conservative Party; 25 October 2022 – 2 November 2024
- Cabinet: Sunak ministry (2022-2024); Sunak shadow cabinet (2024)
- Party: Conservative
- Election: Leadership; 2022; General; 2024 (defeated)
- Appointed by: Charles III (Note: Only as prime minister and leader of the opposition)

Rishi Sunak was elected as Leader of the Conservative Party in October 2022, following Liz Truss's resignation amid the political crisis surrounding her government.

== Term as Prime Minister (2022–2024) ==
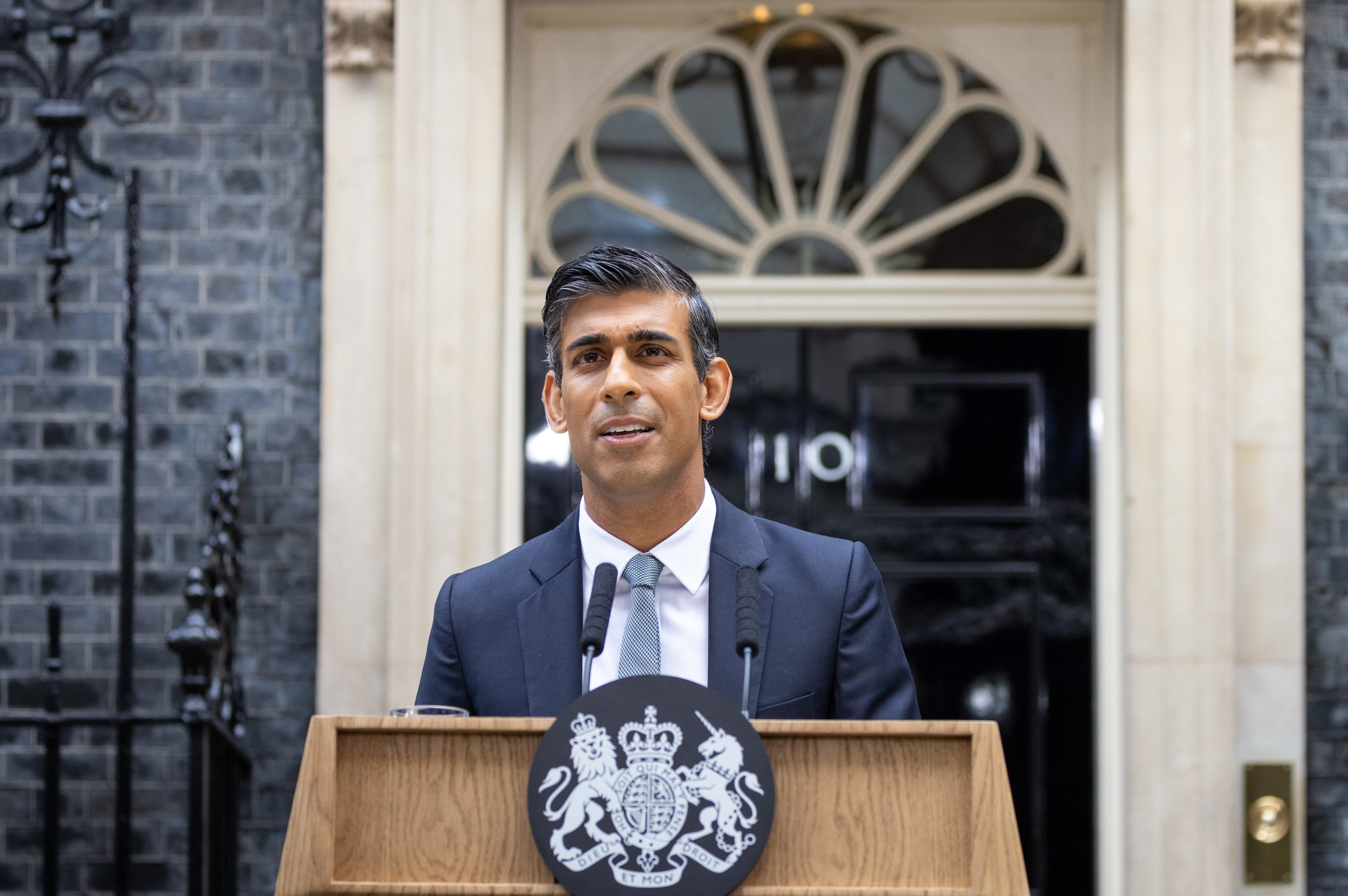
Sunak delivering his first speech as Prime Minister, 25 October 2022

As the leader of the majority party in the House of Commons, Sunak was appointed as prime minister by Charles III on 25 October 2022, becoming the first British Asian to take the office. At 42, Sunak became the youngest prime minister since Robert Jenkinson, 2nd Earl of Liverpool, in 1812. In his first speech as prime minister, Sunak said that Truss "was not wrong" to want to improve growth and that he "admired her restlessness to create change", and added that "some mistakes were made", and that he was elected as party leader, and prime minister, in part to fix them. He said, "I will place economic stability and confidence at the heart of this government's agenda.

=== Cabinet ===
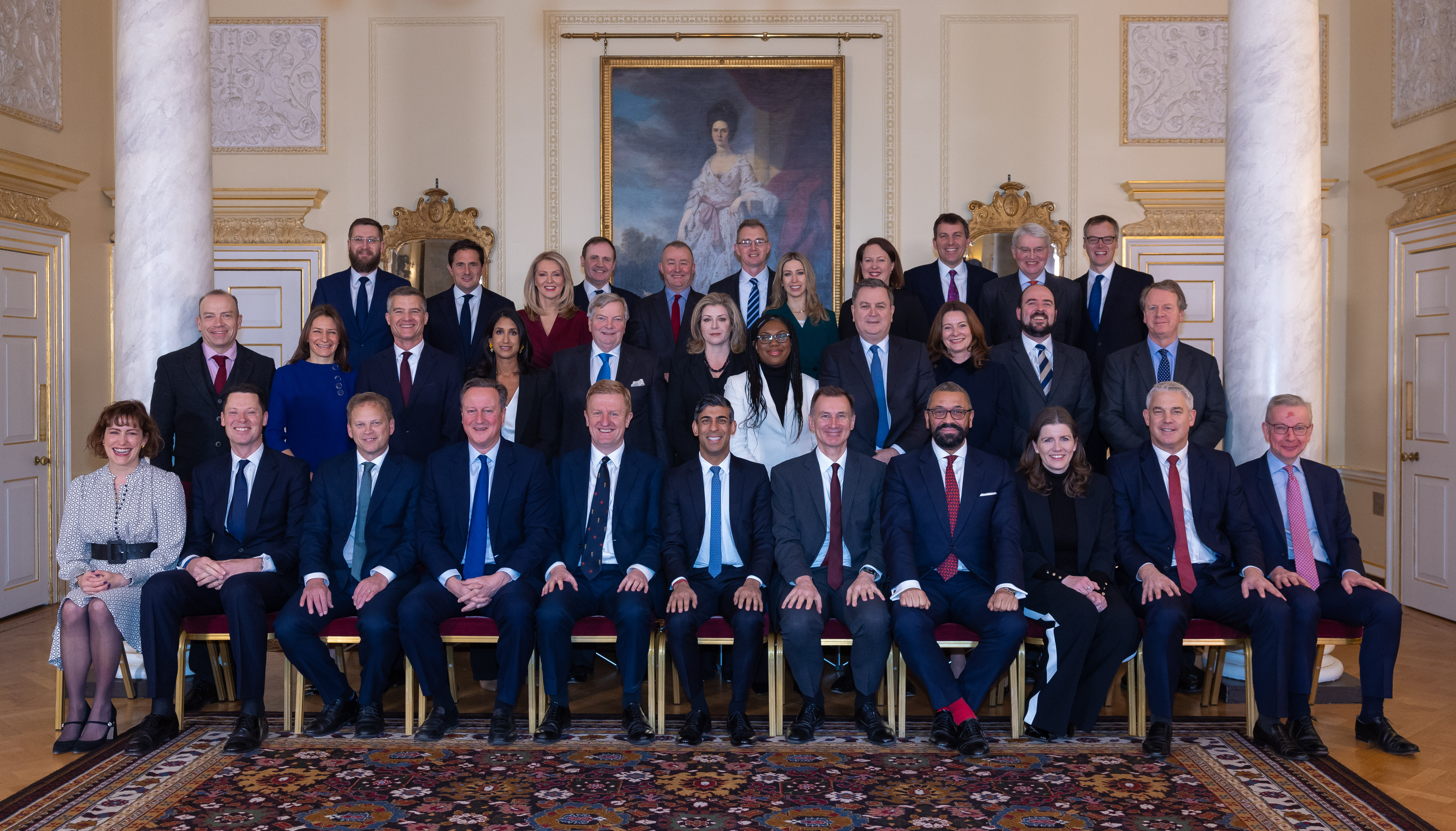
Sunak with his Cabinet, 9 January 2024

Sunak selected his cabinet ministers after his appointment as prime minister. Jeremy Hunt was appointed Chancellor of the Exchequer, and Dominic Raab was also re-appointed as deputy prime minister and Justice Secretary, he later resigned from these roles in April 2023 and was replaced by Oliver Dowden. James Cleverly was appointed Foreign Secretary with Suella Braverman as Home Secretary. Ben Wallace was appointed Secretary of State for Defence. Michael Gove was appointed Levelling Up Secretary, Grant Shapps was appointed as Secretary of State for Business, Energy and Industrial Strategy, and Penny Mordaunt became Leader of the House of Commons and Lord President of the council. Other key appointments included Simon Hart as Parliamentary Secretary to the Treasury and Chief Whip of the House of Commons, Nadhim Zahawi as Chairman of the Conservative Party, Oliver Dowden as Chancellor of the Duchy of Lancaster, Thérèse Coffey as Environment Secretary, Mel Stride as Work and Pensions Secretary and Mark Harper as Transport Secretary.

==== Reshuffles ====
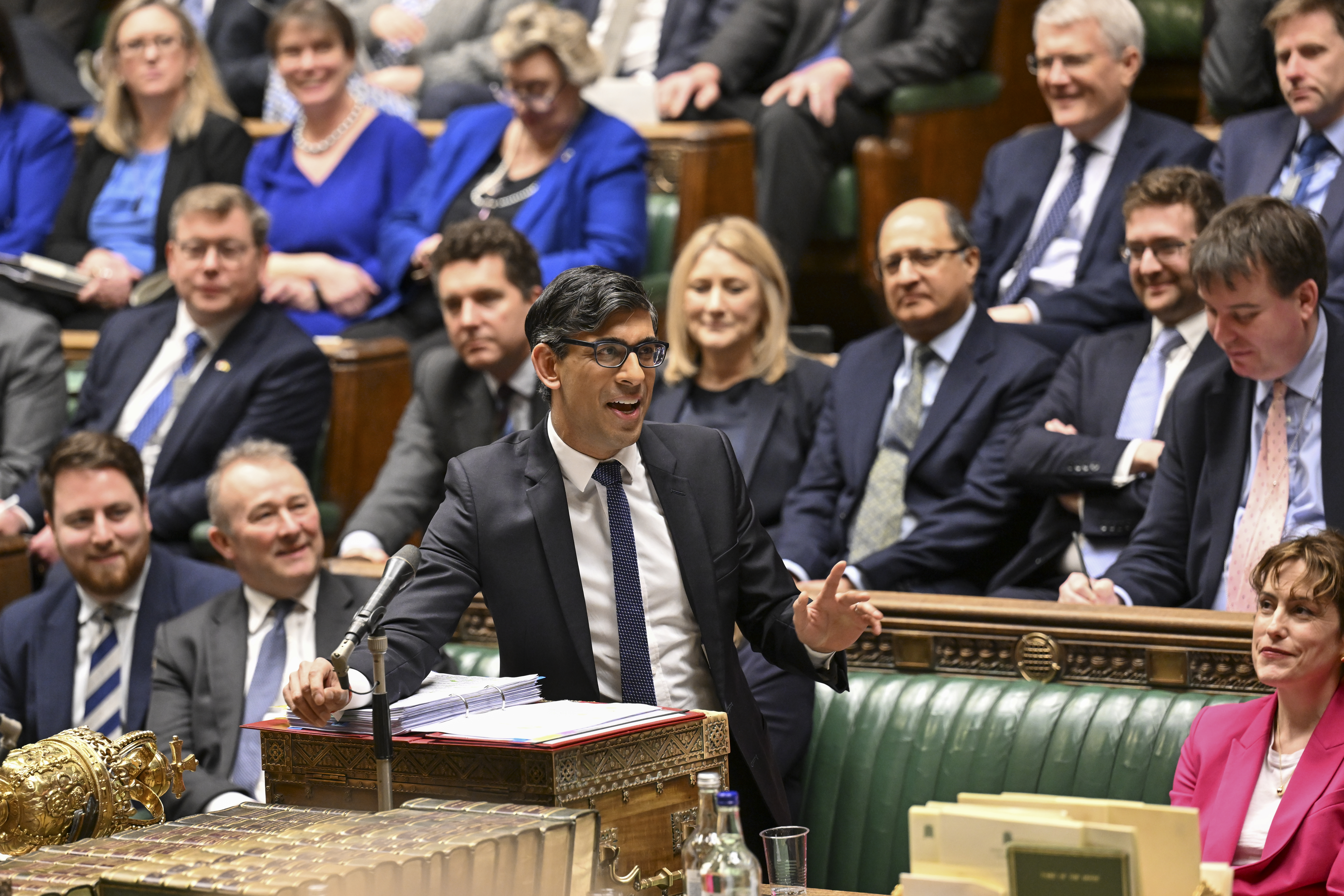
Sunak speaking during Prime Minister's Questions, 7 February 2024

Sunak's first cabinet reshuffle in February 2023 saw a significant restructuring of government departments. New departments included those for Business and Trade, Energy Security and Net Zero, and Science, Innovation and Technology. The Department for International Trade and the Department for Business, Energy and Industrial Strategy were split and merged into other departments. Ministers who joined the cabinet in the first reshuffle included Greg Hands took over as chairman from Zahawi, though later resigned and replaced by Richard Holden. Lucy Frazer became Secretary of State for Culture, Media and Sport taking over from Donelan. Rachel Maclean left the backbenches and joined the Department for Levelling Up, Housing and Communities. Sunak's last cabinet reshuffle in November 2023 saw the return of former prime minister David Cameron to government following a seven-year absence from frontline politics, replacing James Cleverly as foreign secretary. It also saw the departures of Braverman and Coffey from government and Hands from the cabinet, and the appointment of Laura Trott as Chief Secretary to the Treasury.

=== Foreign policy ===
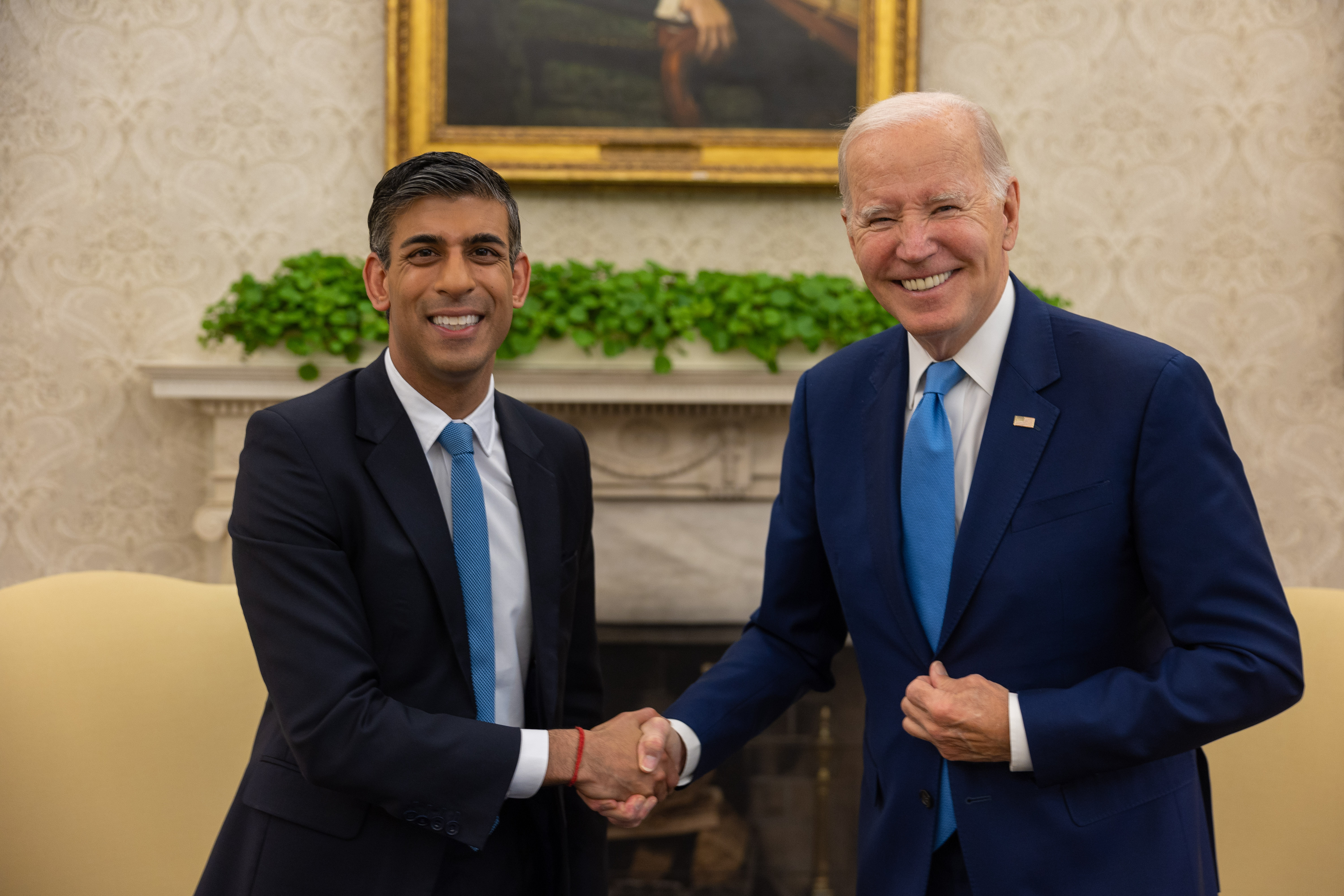
Sunak with US President Joe Biden at the White House, 8 June 2023

In February 2023, Sunak negotiated a proposed agreement with the EU on Northern Ireland's trading arrangements which was published as the Windsor Framework. On 27 February, Sunak delivered a statement to the House of Commons, saying that the proposed agreement "protects Northern Ireland's place in our Union. On 22 March, the date of the parliamentary vote, 22 Conservative MPs and six DUP MPs voted against the government legislation. The vote ultimately passed by 515 votes to 29.

==== Immigration ====
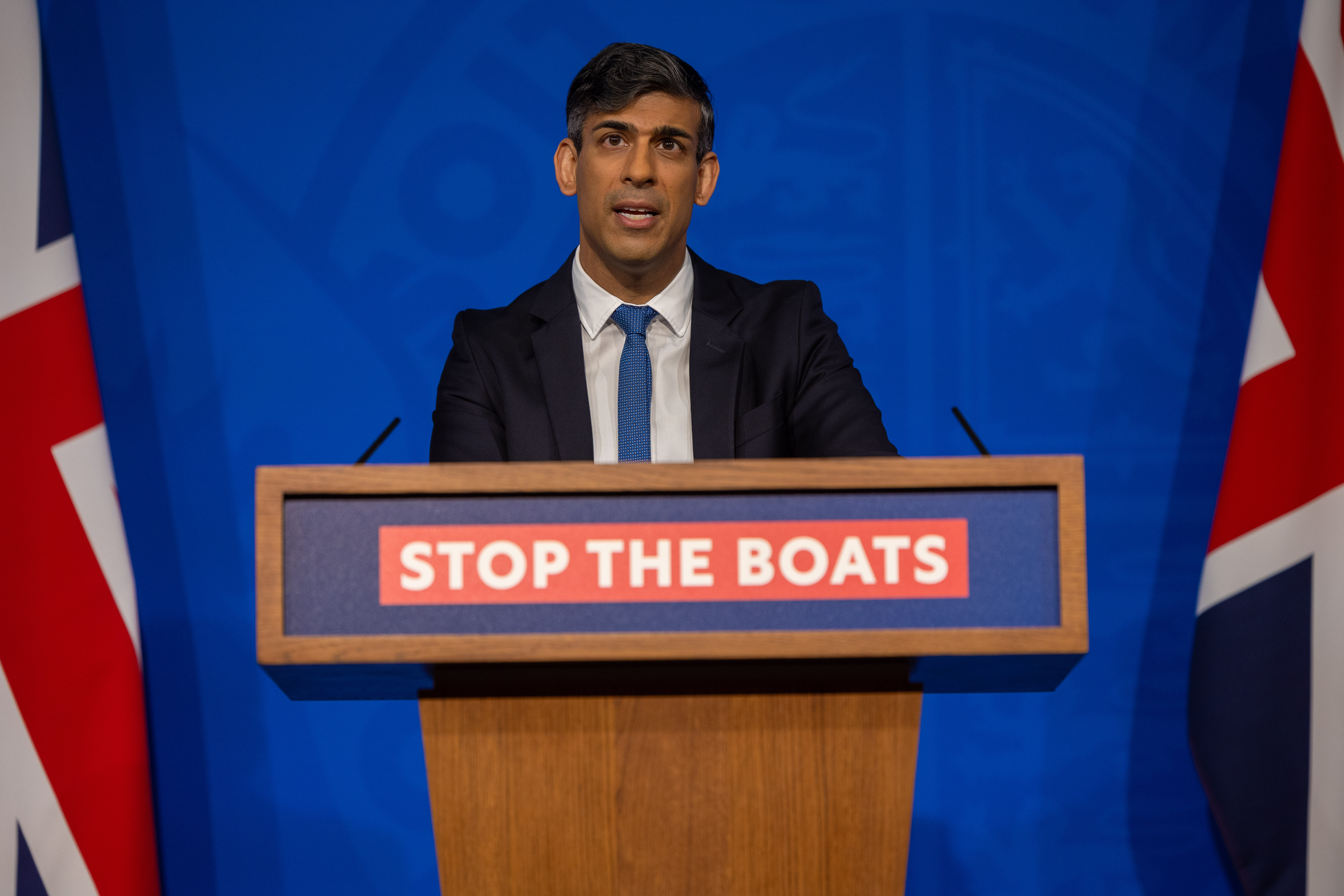
Sunak holds a press conference on the Rwanda asylum plan, 22 April 2024.

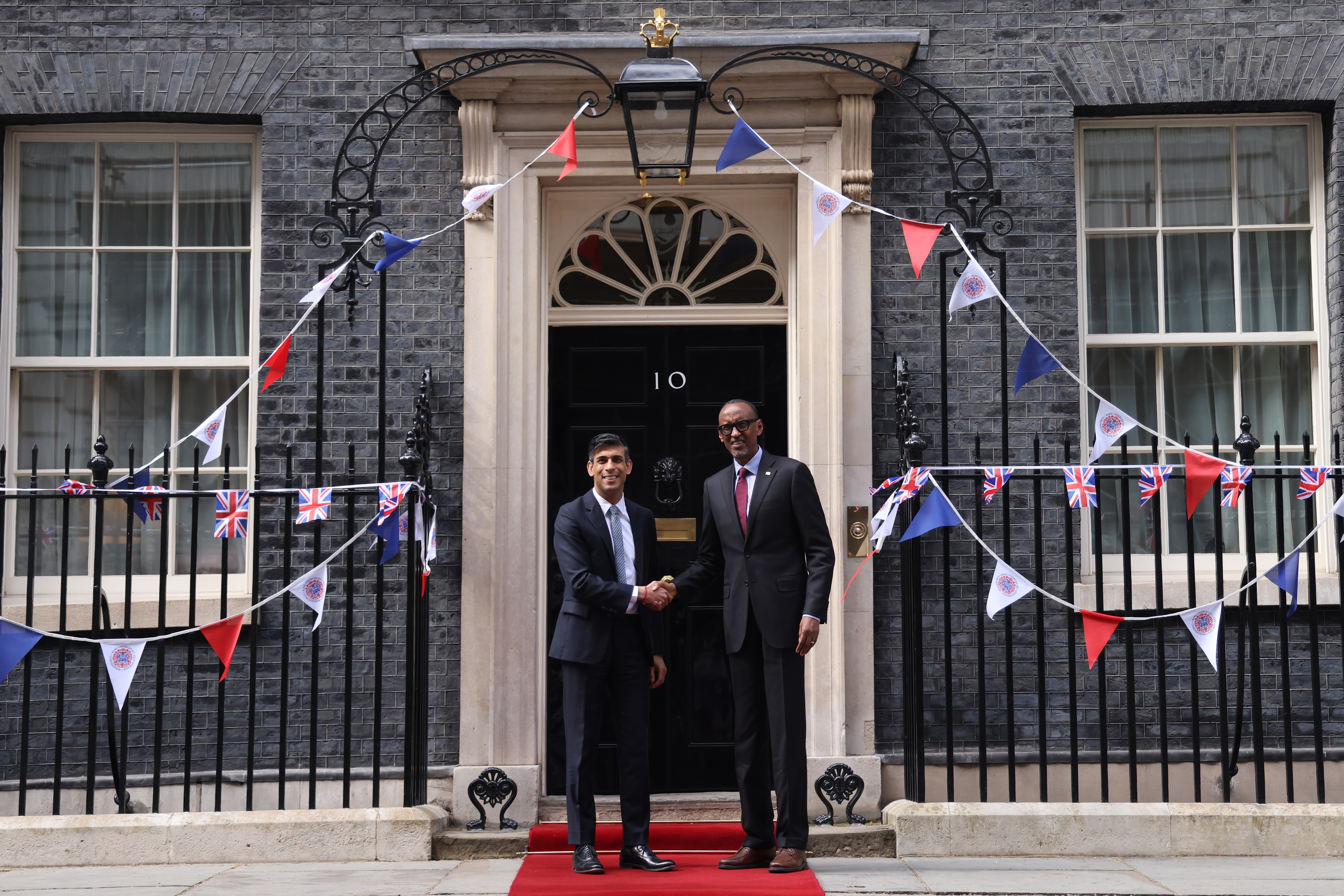
Sunak meeting Rwandan president Paul Kagame in Downing Street

In 2019 the Conservative Party and Boris Johnson pledged to reduce net migration below 250,000 per year, but Sunak said in 2023 that the priority was not to reduce legal immigration but to stop illegal immigration. Nearly 30,000 undocumented migrants crossed the Channel in small boats to the UK in 2023. Long-term net migration to the United Kingdom (the number of people immigrating minus the number emigrating) reached a record high of 764,000 in 2022, with legal immigration at 1.26 million and emigration at 493,000. Of the 1,218,000 legal migrants coming to the UK in 2023, only 10% were EU Nationals.

Sunak continued the Rwanda asylum plan to have asylum seekers and illegal immigrants sent to Rwanda for processing. After the plan was blocked by the UK's Court of Appeal in June 2023 due to concerns over international law and the possibility of refoulement (persecution of those sent to Rwanda), Sunak vowed to appeal against the verdict to the Supreme Court.

On 15 November 2023, the Supreme Court upheld the ruling and declared the plan unlawful. In response, Sunak sent Cleverly to Rwanda to negotiate a treaty with Rwanda focused on preventing refoulement which must now be ratified by the British and Rwandan Parliaments. The government also introduced the Safety of Rwanda (Asylum and Immigration) Bill, emergency legislation giving ministers the power to disapply sections of the Human Rights Act 1998 and certain aspects of international law in order to allow them to declare Rwanda a safe country according to UK law. The bill was criticised by many on the right of the party for not going far enough, resulting in the resignation of the minister for immigration, Robert Jenrick.

On 12 December 2023 Sunak secured a government majority of 44 for the Safety of Rwanda Bill, despite the opposition of all other parties and abstentions from members of the European Research Group.

==== Russia and Ukraine ====
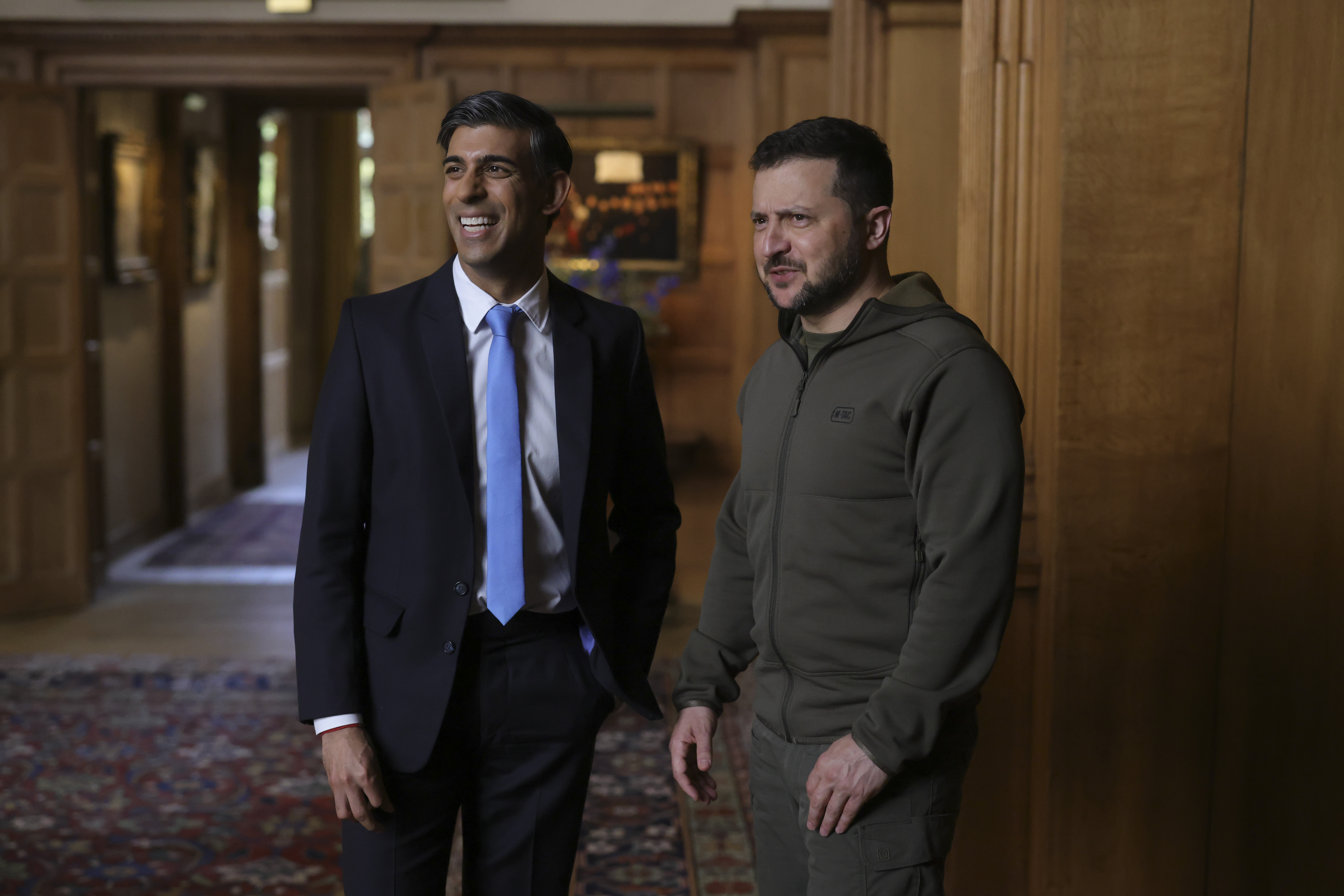
Sunak with Ukrainian President Volodymyr Zelenskyy at Chequers, May 2023

Following the 15 November missile explosion in Poland, Sunak met US President Joe Biden and delivered a speech about it. Sunak later met Ukrainian President Volodymyr Zelenskyy, and pledged to give Ukraine £50 million in aid. After meeting Zelenskyy, Sunak said: "I am proud of how the UK stood with Ukraine from the very beginning. And I am here today to say the UK and our allies will continue to stand with Ukraine, as it fights to end this barbarous war and deliver a just peace."

Sunak visited Ukraine on 12 January 2024 to sign a new U.K.-Ukraine Agreement on Security Cooperation with Zelenskyy promising £2.5 billion in military aid to Ukraine, including long-range missiles, artillery ammunition, air defence and maritime security, in addition to £200 million to be spent on military drones, making the UK the largest deliverer of drones to Ukraine out of any nation according to Downing Street.

==== Israel and Palestine ====
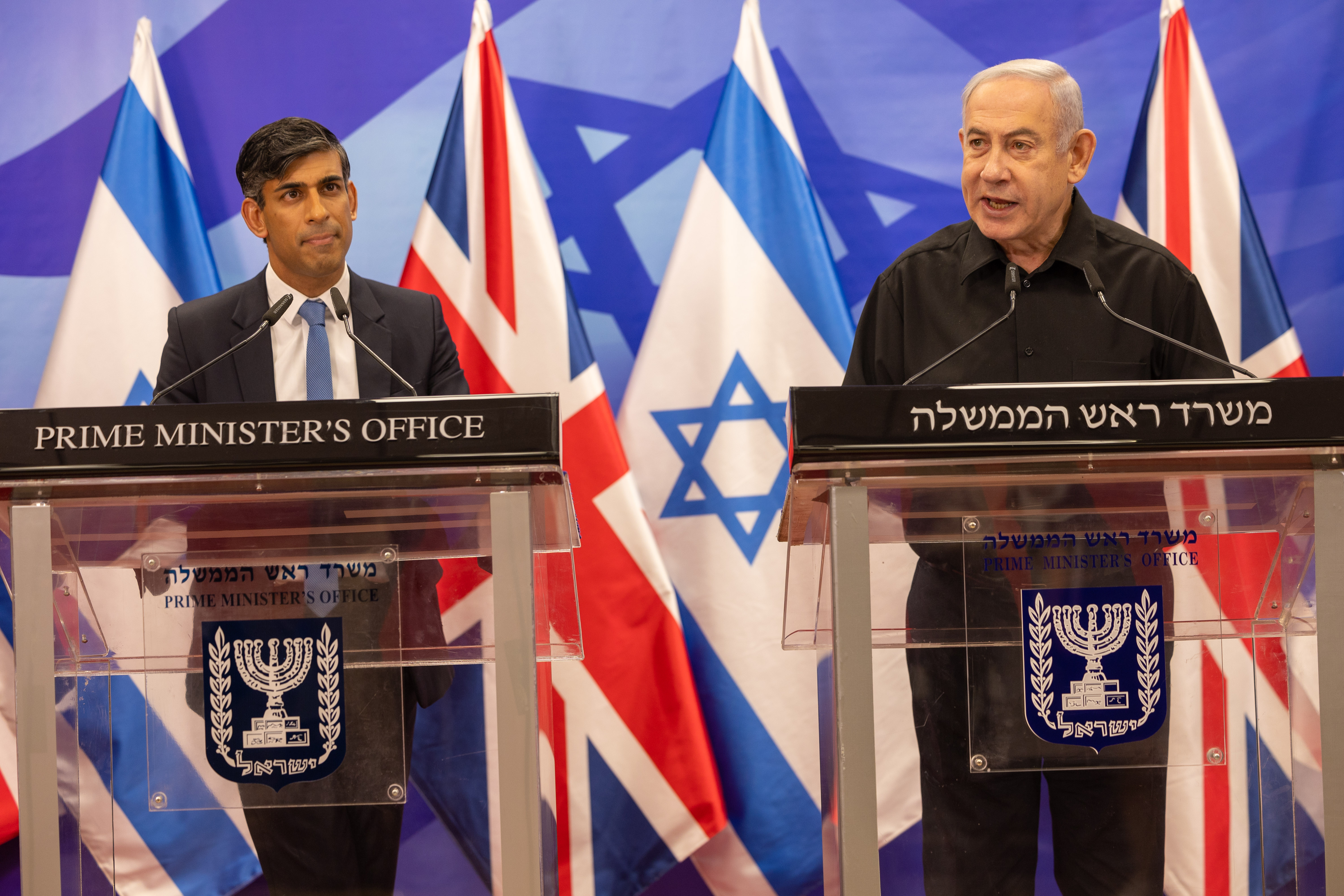
Sunak with Israeli prime minister Benjamin Netanyahu in Jerusalem, 19 October 2023

In October 2023, Hamas led a surprise attack on Israel that devolved into a war and a growing humanitarian crisis in the Gaza Strip. Sunak pledged the UK's support for Israel and declared that Israel "has an absolute right to defend itself". Sunak backed calls for humanitarian pauses to allow for aid to be brought into Gaza, although he initially rejected calls for a full ceasefire as he argued that this would only benefit Hamas.

Israel used British-supplied weapons in the war. However, Sunak later condemned the high number of civilian casualties in Gaza and called for a "sustainable ceasefire" in which all Israeli hostages were returned to Israel, attacks against Israel ceased and humanitarian aid was allowed into Gaza. His government supported the two-state solution as a resolution to the conflict.

When the International Criminal Court prosecutor Karim Ahmad Khan announced that he would seek to charge Israeli prime minister Benjamin Netanyahu with war crimes, Sunak criticised the move as "unhelpful" and accused Khan of drawing a moral equivalence between Israel and Hamas.

=== Local election results ===
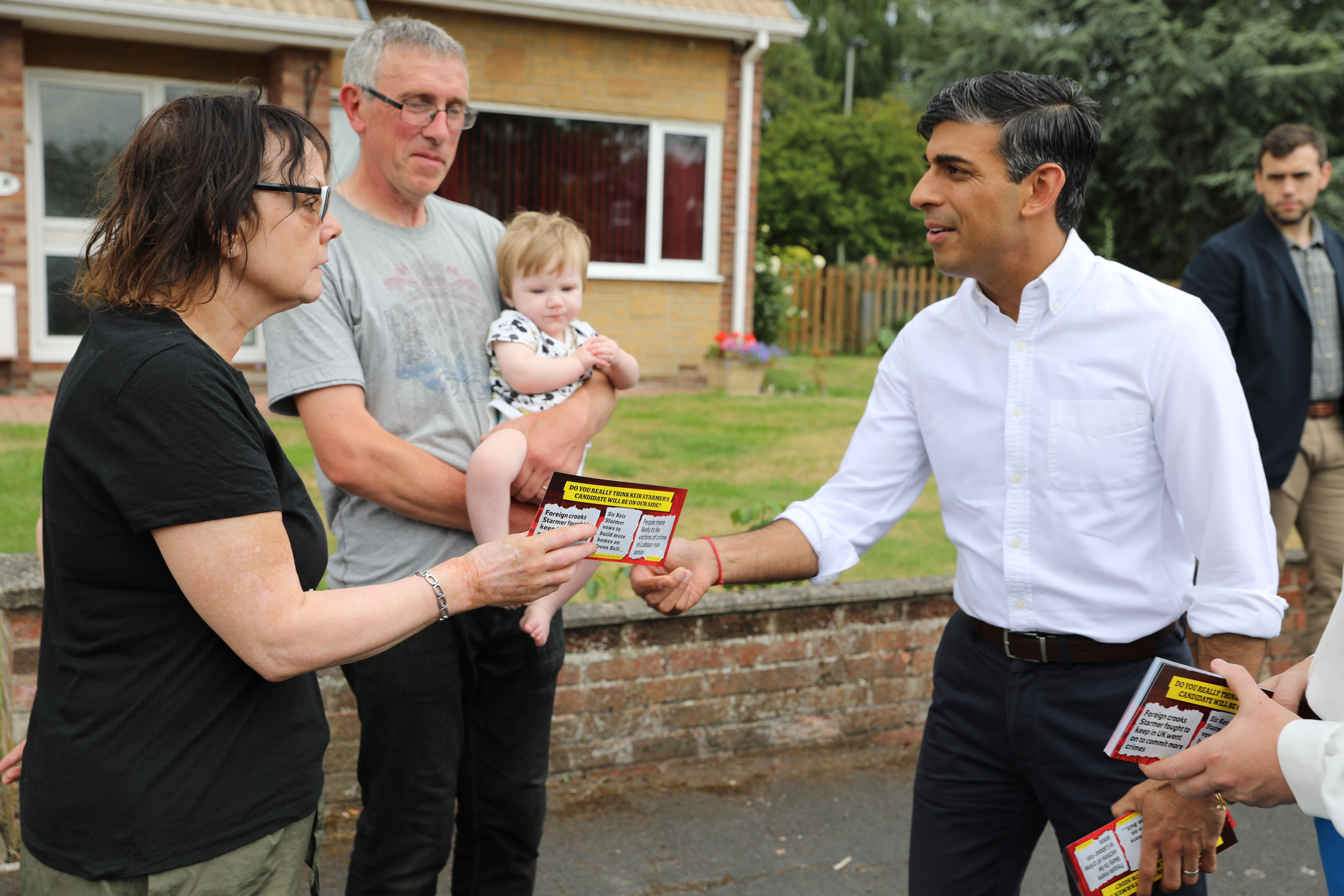
Sunak campaigning in July 2023

Sunak was faced with the task of rebuilding the Conservatives' reputation which had been significantly damaged by the controversies and scandals of the previous year and the Truss ministry. While their poll ratings recovered slightly over the following months, it still wasn't enough to bring them back to pre-Truss levels. Sunak contested his first local elections as leader on 4 May 2023, where the Conservatives suffered heavy losses. Two months later, on 20 July 2023, they lost two seats in by-elections; one to Labour and one to the Liberal Democrats. Their fortunes remained unchanged throughout policy changes of the following year, such as the shelving of the HS2 northern phase in October. The Conservatives lost two further seats in by-elections on 15 February 2024.

In March 2024, there were suggestions that Sunak could face a leadership challenge before the upcoming general election — which was expected within the calendar year — if the Conservatives perform poorly at the local elections on 2 May. Sunak however said he would resist a challenge, even if that ends up being the case. As predicted, 2 May saw grim showing for the Conservatives, who suffered their worst local election results since 1996. Additionally, they lost another seat to Labour in the Blackpool South by-election, and narrowly lost the West Midlands mayoral election in a knife-edge vote. Sunak's premiership was described as more stable than that of his two predecessors, while still not being able to represent a turnaround for the Conservatives.

=== 2024 general election and resignation ===
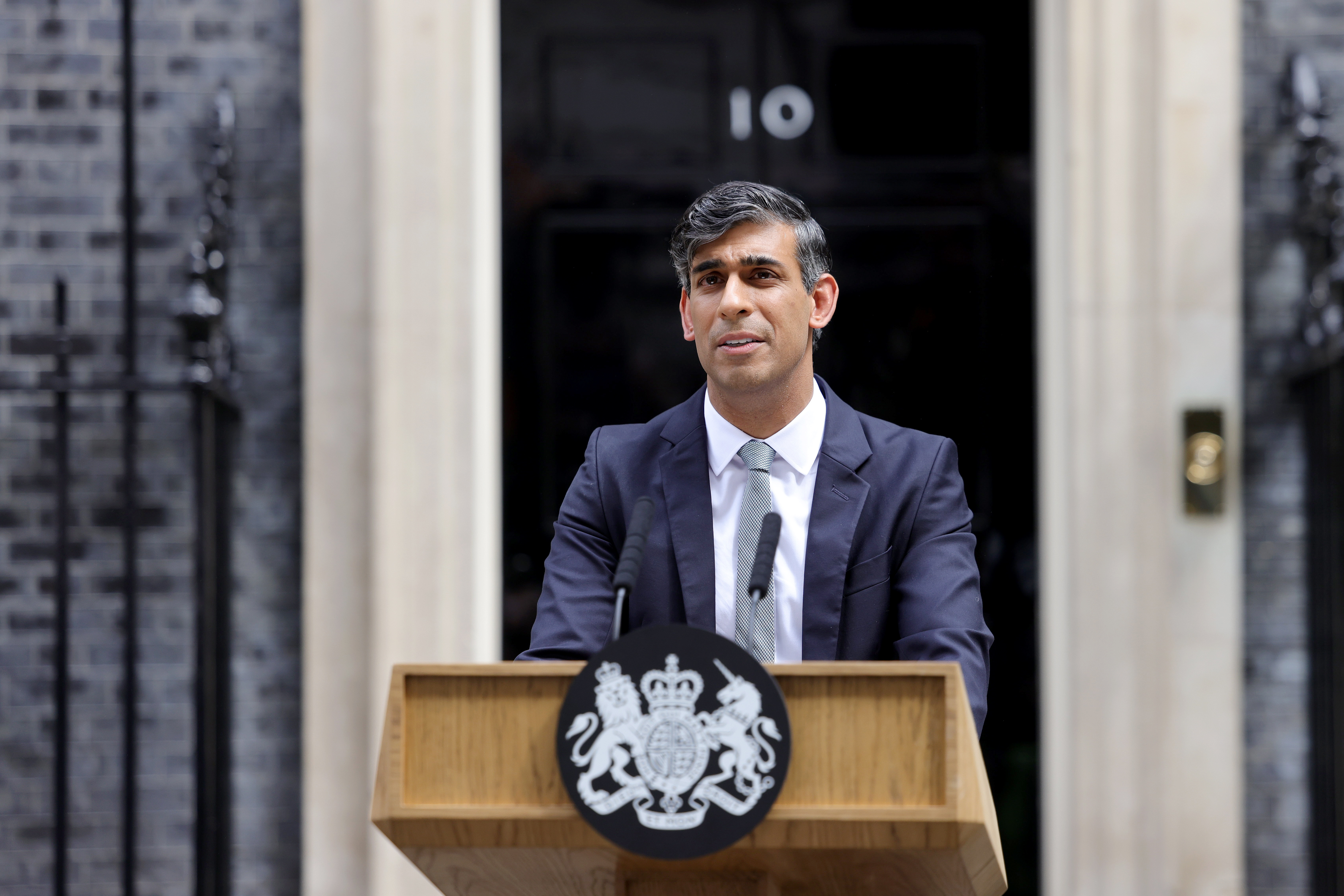
Sunak delivers speech before leaving 10 Downing Street in July 2024

On the afternoon of 22 May 2024, Sunak announced that he had asked the King to call a general election for 4 July 2024, surprising his own MPs. Though Sunak had the option to wait until December 2024 to call the election, he said that he decided on the date because he believed that the economy was improving, and that "falling inflation and net migration figures would reinforce the Conservatives' election message of 'sticking to the plan'".

Sunak sought to rebuild the Conservative's reputation following a slump in popularity after the short-lived Truss ministry and a slew of controversies including Partygate that irreparably damaged Johnson's ministry, through campaigning on stabilising the economy, the Rwanda asylum plan, further strengthening the State Pension, and introducing National Service. He released the Conservative manifesto Clear Plan. Bold Action. Secure Future. on 11 June, addressing the economy, taxes, welfare, expanding free childcare, education, healthcare, environment, energy, transport, and crime. Sunak stated during the general election campaign that if his party lost the election he intended to remain as a backbench MP for the next 5 years. On 6 June 2024, the 80th anniversary of D-Day, Sunak was heavily criticised for leaving commemoration events early to do an interview with ITV, including by veterans. Sunak apologised three times over the following week.

Labour won a landslide victory in the general election, ending 14 years of Conservative government. A record number of Conservative MPs either stood down or lost their seats at the election. Three Cabinet members stood down and eight full members and four who attended Cabinet lost their seats, the highest number of sitting cabinet seat losses in history. Sunak conceded the election on 5 July. In his resignation speech before tending his resignation to the King, Sunak apologised to Conservative voters and candidates for the party's heavy defeat, and announced his intention to resign as party leader once a new leader is elected. He also offered support to the incoming prime minister Keir Starmer, saying he was "a decent, public-spirited man" he respected and expressed hope he would be successful.

To all the Conservative candidates and campaigners who worked tirelessly but without success, I am sorry that we could not deliver what your efforts deserved. It pains me to think how many good colleagues, who contributed so much to their communities and our country, will now no longer sit in the House of Commons. I thank them for their hard work, and their service. Following this result, I will step down as party leader, not immediately, but once the formal arrangements for selecting my successor are in place. It is important that after 14 years in government the Conservative Party rebuilds, but also that it takes up its crucial role in Opposition professionally and effectively.

== Term as Leader of the Opposition (July–November 2024) ==
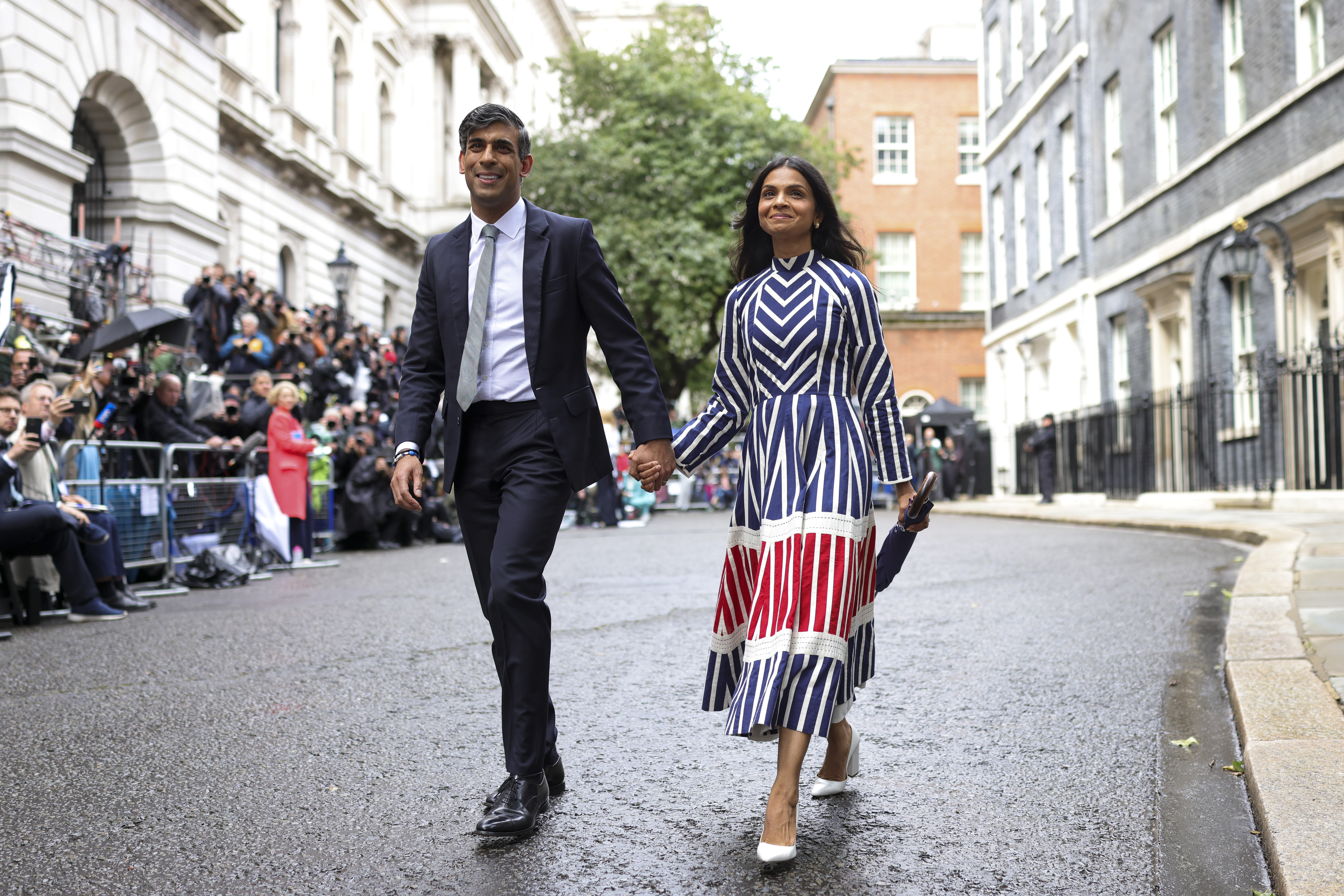
Sunak and his wife, Akshata Murty, leaving Downing Street

After Starmer succeeded Sunak as prime minister, Sunak immediately became Leader of the Opposition and formed his shadow cabinet on 8 July.

Most members of Sunak's cabinet heading into the 2024 general election were given the same portfolios in the shadow cabinet, including former chancellor Jeremy Hunt, who became shadow chancellor, and former home secretary James Cleverly, who became shadow home secretary. Former foreign secretary David Cameron chose to retire from frontline politics, with his former deputy Andrew Mitchell becoming shadow foreign secretary instead. Richard Holden resigned as party chairman, and was succeeded by Richard Fuller in an interim capacity outside shadow cabinet.

Sunak appointed new officeholders to the portfolios held by the eleven cabinet ministers who lost their seats in the election, including Edward Argar, who became shadow justice secretary after the outgoing justice secretary Alex Chalk lost his seat, as well as Helen Whately, who became shadow transport secretary after the outgoing transport secretary Mark Harper also lost his seat. Among other noteworthy appointments, Kemi Badenoch became the shadow housing, communities and local government secretary and former deputy prime minister Oliver Dowden became deputy leader of the opposition.

Sunak remained leader until his successor, Kemi Badenoch, was elected in the 2024 Conservative Party leadership election, after which he returned to the backbenches. Responding to the 2024 State Opening of Parliament, Sunak said his party would not oppose the government "for the sake of it", but would hold them to account on their election promises. On proposals to change planning laws, Sunak said that though such changes were needed "a system that does not allow local people to have a say will damage public consent for more housing in the long term". While he respected Starmer's decision to scrap the Rwanda asylum plan, Sunak said that there needed to be an alternative deterrent, otherwise "a large number of those who crossed the Channel illegally will end up remaining here".

In that same speech, Sunak summarized the rapid trajectory of his political career:

On the Government benches life comes at you fast.

Soon, you might be fortunate enough to be tapped on the shoulder and be offered a junior ministerial role, then you'll find yourself attending cabinet, then in the cabinet and then when the prime minister's position becomes untenable you might end up being called to the highest office.

And, before you know it, you have a bright future behind you and you're left wondering whether you can credibly be an elder statesman at the age of 44.

== Notes ==
1. Only as prime minister and leader of the opposition
