= Kilroy (TV series) =

Television series

- Also known as: Day to Day
- Genre: Daytime chat show
- Presented by: Robert Kilroy-Silk
- Country of origin: United Kingdom
- Original language: English

Production
- Running time: 60 minutes
- Production company: Kilroy Productions

Original release
- Network: BBC One
- Release: 24 November 1986 – 23 January 2004

Kilroy is a BBC One daytime chat show hosted by Robert Kilroy-Silk that began on 24 November 1986 and finished on 23 January 2004 after 17 years. Originally called Day to Day, the programme was renamed to Kilroy in September 1987.

The format featured the host moving among an audience made up of experts and members of the public, speaking to them one by one on a different topical or moral issue per episode.

In February 1999, the show was one of three to be caught up in a fake guests controversy and faced similar accusations to ITV's Trisha and The Vanessa Show. Kilroy-Silk defended his show saying that after 1,700 programmes and 120,000 guests, it had only been hoaxed four or five times and called for people who hoax programmes to be prosecuted.

== Series ==
Season	Start date	End date	Episodes
1	24 November 1986	22 May 1987	
2	12 October 1987	27 May 1988	
3	17 October 1988	26 May 1989	
4	16 October 1989	3 April 1990	
5	15 October 1990	26 March 1991	
6	14 October 1991	20 March 1992	
7	12 October 1992	2 April 1993	
8	11 October 1993	20 May 1994	
9	17 October 1994	26 May 1995	
10	16 October 1995	24 May 1996	
11	2 September 1996	25 July 1997	
12	1 September 1997	24 July 1998	
13	7 September 1998	23 July 1999	
14	6 September 1999	19 July 2000	
15	31 August 2000	20 July 2001	
16	3 September 2001	8 July 2002	
17	2 September 2002	4 July 2003	
18	1 September 2003	23 January 2004	

== Controversy and cancellation ==
The show was taken off the air in 2004 after Kilroy-Silk made allegedly racist remarks. Kilroy-Silk questioned what contribution Arabs have made to civilisation beyond oil. The Commission for Racial Equality reported him to the police.

The BBC cancelled the show, stating that his views were a threat to the network's impartiality. Kilroy claimed afterwards on the BBC's Question Time that he had been under a six-month investigation when this happened. He stated that his show was cancelled because he was anti-religion, rather than racist. However, panellist Shaparak Khorsandi claimed that his views were about Arabs as a people rather than their religion. Kilroy-Silk had previously claimed to have apologised in 2004. It was rejected primarily because Kilroy-Silk himself twisted his words. Iqbal Sacranie (secretary-general of the Muslim Council of Britain) claimed that Kilroy-Silk had not retracted his views but skimmed over the apology and changed a few words.

The programme was replaced by Now You're Talking!, which followed a similar format and was presented by Nicky Campbell and Nadia Sawalha. The show was also produced by Kilroy-Silk's production company. Though contemporary reports suggested that his agent had offered the show to Channel 5, the broadcaster did not commission it.
