= Anneliese Midgley =

British politician

The Right Honourable Anneliese Midgley MP
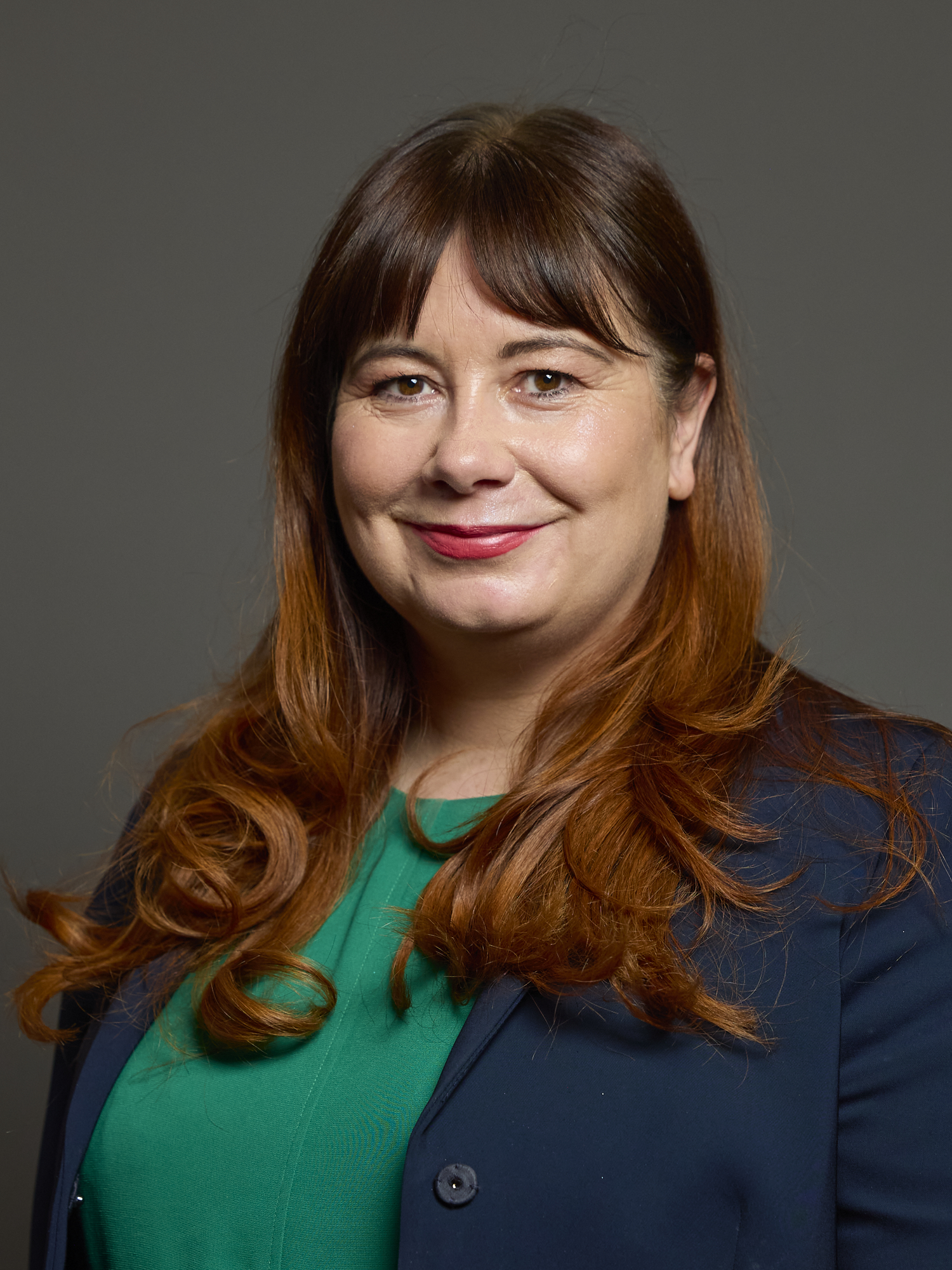
- Official portrait, 2024

Government Chief Whip in the House of Commons Parliamentary Secretary to the Treasury
- Incumbent
- Assumed office 20 July 2026
- Prime Minister: Andy Burnham
- Preceded by: Jonathan Reynolds

Member of Parliament for Knowsley
- Incumbent
- Assumed office 4 July 2024
- Preceded by: George Howarth
- Majority: 18,319 (50.9%)

Personal details
- Born: 8 February 1976 (age 50) Stockbridge Village, Merseyside, England
- Party: Labour

Anneliese Midgley (born 8 February 1976) is a British politician and trade unionist who has served as Chief Whip and Parliamentary Secretary to the Treasury since 2026. A member of the Labour Party, she has been the Member of Parliament for Knowsley since 2024. She is a former senior trade union and Labour Party official. In Parliament she serves as Secretary of the Trade Union Group of Labour MPs.

== Early life ==
Midgley grew up in Stockbridge Village, Knowsley, Merseyside, formerly known as Cantril Farm. Midgley's parents had moved there from Everton and Liverpool. Her father worked at the Ford Halewood car plant, now Jaguar Land Rover Halewood. She credits her father's secure, unionised job for providing the family with stability and enabled them to eventually purchase a home. He died three years before Midgley's election to Parliament.

Midgley moved to Paris at 17 years old and worked in a bookshop. She subsequently worked in the music industry.

== Early political career ==
Midgley has worked as Political Director of Unite the Union and for the Trade Union Congress.

She also worked for Ken Livingstone at City Hall during his time as Mayor of London, for Jeremy Corbyn's 2015 leadership campaign (becoming his Deputy Chief of Staff), and later joined Keir Starmer's team as a senior adviser in opposition.

Midgley was Starmer's initial choice for the role of Labour Party General Secretary, though she did not stand for the position.

== Parliamentary career ==
In February 2024, she was selected to succeed long-serving MP for Knowsley George Howarth at the next general election, which took place in July. She was elected with 67.3% of the vote.

Midgley has worked with Cheryl Korbel, mother of murder victim Olivia Pratt-Korbel, in support of a proposed law requiring offenders to face victims' families in court. She read Korbel's victim impact statement aloud in the House of Commons to press the issue.

She has also campaigned on behalf of creatives and musicians with regard to the impact of generative artificial intelligence on copyright, performers' rights and livelihoods.

Midgley has supported the Hillsborough Law, calling for a statutory "duty of candour" on public authorities to ensure transparency and justice for victims' families.

Midgley was one of the key figures in Labour party leadership and Prime Minister hopeful Andy Burnham's 2026 Makerfield by-election victory and his leadership campaign. The New Statesman reported that Midgley was "quickly becoming one of the most influential figures in Labour". On 20 July 2026, Burnham appointed Midgley Parliamentary Secretary to the Treasury (Chief Whip).

== Personal life ==
Midgely was previously married to Bob Stanley of the band Saint Etienne. The two later divorced, but remain close friends; Stanley supported her election campaign by allowing her to use the band's track "Only Love Can Break Your Heart" in a campaign video.

== Honours ==
On 21 July 2026, Midgley was sworn of the Privy Council, entitling her to the honorific style "The Right Honourable" for life.
