= Knowsley (constituency) =

UK Parliament constituency (since 2010)

Coordinates: 53.461°N 2.828°W

- Borough constituency for the House of Commons
- Interactive map of boundaries since 2024
- Location within North West England
- County: Merseyside
- Electorate: 71,228 (March 2020)
- Major settlements: Huyton, Kirkby, Knowsley, Roby

Current constituency
- Created: 2010
- Member of Parliament: Anneliese Midgley (Labour)
- Seats: One
- Created from: Knowsley South, Knowsley North and Sefton East

Knowsley is a constituency (Note: A borough constituency (for the purposes of election expenses and type of returning officer)) represented in the House of Commons of the UK Parliament since 2024 by Anneliese Midgley of the Labour Party. (Note: As with all constituencies, the constituency elects one member of parliament (MP) by the first past the post system of election at least every five years.) She has served as Government Chief Whip since 2026.

== Constituency profile ==
Knowsley is a constituency located in Merseyside and covers most of the Metropolitan Borough of Knowsley. The constituency forms part of Liverpool's wider urban area but lies outside the city's official boundaries. It includes the towns of Kirkby, Huyton and Prescot and the villages of Knowsley and Stockbridge Village. Kirkby was developed after World War II to house Liverpool residents displaced by the Liverpool Blitz and slum clearances, and to house workers at ROF Kirkby, a large munitions factory. The constituency mainly consists of low-income social housing. It is one of the country's most deprived constituencies, with almost all of it falling within the top 10% most-deprived areas in England. The average house price is lower than the rest of North West England and is around half the national average.

Knowsley has the highest proportion of residents identifying as Christian of any local authority in England and Wales. Like much of the Merseyside area, there is a large Catholic population. In general, residents have low levels of education, income and professional employment. A high proportion work in retail, manufacturing and transport. White people made up 96% of the population at the 2021 census. At the local borough council, most of the constituency is represented by Labour Party councillors with some independents elected in Kirkby and Liberal Democrats elected in Knowsley village. An estimated 52% of voters in the constituency supported leaving the European Union in the 2016 referendum, identical to the nationwide figure.

== History ==
Created for the 2010 general election (during the Boundary Commission for England's Fifth periodic review of Westminster constituencies), it was believed to present the safest seat in the country, with an estimated Labour majority of 24,333 votes. The area returned the second highest share of the vote seen by a candidate for the Labour Party, of 70.9%, behind the 72.0% achieved in Liverpool Walton. The same ranking of results nationally by percentage majority occurred in 2015, when it became the safest seat in the country in absolute terms, beating East Ham by 403 votes.

It ranked foremost by party majority in 2017, where it was followed directly by East Ham and 28 other seats won by Labour candidates, after which followed North East Hampshire. It achieved the highest majority for any British Member of Parliament since the advent of universal suffrage, with Labour winning with a majority of 42,214 votes, surpassing the 36,230-vote majority held by then-Conservative Prime Minister John Major in his Huntingdon constituency in 1992.

On its creation, the seat was won by George Howarth, who had served as MP for the predecessor seats of Knowsley North (1986–1997) and Knowsley North and Sefton East (1997–2010). On his retirement for the 2024 general election, he was succeeded by Anneliese Midgley on a reduced majority over Reform UK of 50.9%.

== Boundaries ==
=== 2010–2024 ===
The Metropolitan Borough of Knowsley wards of Cherryfield, Kirkby Central, Longview, Northwood, Page Moss, Park, Prescot West, Roby, St Bartholomews, St Gabriels, St Michaels, Shevington, Stockbridge, Swanside, and Whitefield.

The constituency replaced most of the previous Knowsley South constituency, as well as the parts of Knowsley North and Sefton East in the Knowsley borough. Distant parts from the centre of the metropolitan borough were covered by the new St Helens South and Whiston and Garston and Halewood constituencies.

=== Current ===
Further to the 2023 review of Westminster constituencies, which came into effect for the 2024 general election, the constituency is composed of the following wards of the Metropolitan Borough of Knowsley (as they existed on 1 December 2020):

- Cherryfield, Northwood, Prescot North, Roby, St Gabriels, St Michaels, Shevington, Stockbridge, and Whitefield.

Allowing for changes to ward names and boundaries, the constituency was reduced in size to bring the electorate within the permitted range by transferring the Page Moss and Swanside wards to Liverpool West Derby.

== Members of Parliament ==
Election	Member	Party
2010	George Howarth	Labour
2024	Anneliese Midgley	Labour

== Elections ==
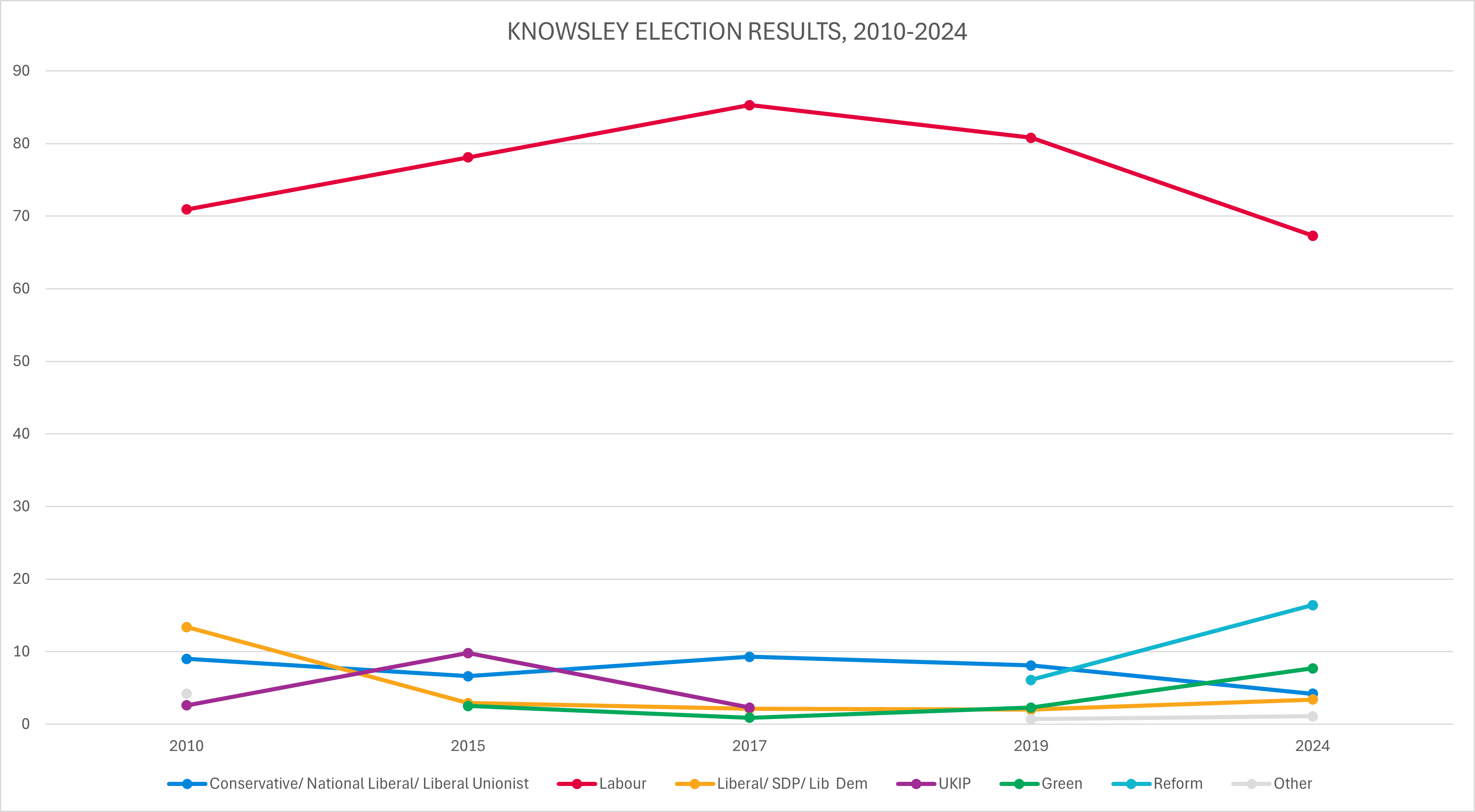
Election results 2010–2024

=== Elections in the 2020s ===
General election 2024: Knowsley
Party	Candidate	Votes	%	±%
Labour	Anneliese Midgley	24,243	67.3	−12.3
Reform	Alexander Hitchmough	5,924	16.4	+10.1
Green	Graham Wickens	2,772	7.7	+5.7
Conservative	Sherrie McDaid	1,496	4.2	−4.5
Liberal Democrats	Kate Tipton	1,232	3.4	+0.9
Workers Party	Graham Padden	245	0.7	New
SDP	Patricia Jameson	135	0.4	New
Majority		18,319	50.9	−21.8
Turnout		36,047	50.2	−15.2
Registered electors		71,964		
Labour hold		Swing	−13.5	

=== Elections in the 2010s ===
General election 2019: Knowsley
Party	Candidate	Votes	%	±%
Labour	George Howarth	44,374	80.8	−4.5
Conservative	Rushi Millns	4,432	8.1	−1.2
Brexit Party	Tim McCullough	3,348	6.1	New
Green	Paul Woodruff	1,262	2.3	+1.4
Liberal Democrats	Joe Slupsky	1,117	2.0	−0.1
Liberal	Ray Catesby	405	0.7	New
Majority		39,942	72.7	−3.3
Turnout		54,938	65.4	−2.4
Labour hold		Swing	−4.6	

This was the largest numerical Labour majority at the 2019 general election.

General election 2017: Knowsley
Party	Candidate	Votes	%	±%
Labour	George Howarth	47,351	85.3	+7.2
Conservative	James Spencer	5,137	9.3	+2.7
UKIP	Neil Miney	1,285	2.3	−7.5
Liberal Democrats	Carl Cashman	1,189	2.1	−0.8
Green	Steve Baines	521	0.9	−1.6
Majority		42,214	76.0	+7.7
Turnout		55,483	67.8	+3.7
Labour hold		Swing	+2.3	

General election 2015: Knowsley
Party	Candidate	Votes	%	±%
Labour	George Howarth	39,628	78.1	+7.2
UKIP	Louise Bours	4,973	9.8	+7.2
Conservative	Alice Bramall	3,367	6.6	−2.4
Liberal Democrats	Carl Cashman	1,490	2.9	−10.5
Green	Vikki Gregorich	1,270	2.5	New
Majority		34,655	68.3	+10.8
Turnout		50,728	64.1	+8.0
Labour hold		Swing	±0.0	

General election 2010: Knowsley
Party	Candidate	Votes	%	±%
Labour	George Howarth*	31,650	70.9	−0.9
Liberal Democrats	Flo Clucas	5,964	13.4	−0.4
Conservative	David Dunne	4,004	9.0	−2.3
BNP	Steven Greenhalgh	1,895	4.2	+2.2
UKIP	Anthony Rundle	1,145	2.6	New
Majority		25,686	57.5	−0.5
Turnout		44,658	56.1	+2.3
Labour hold		Swing	−0.2	

* Served as an MP in the 2005–2010 Parliament

== See also ==
- List of parliamentary constituencies in Merseyside
