= Knowsley North and Sefton East =

UK Parliament constituency (1997–2010)

Coordinates: 53.461°N 2.828°W

- Former county constituency for the House of Commons
- Boundary of Knowsley North and Sefton East in Merseyside for the 2005 general election

- Location of Merseyside within England
- County: Merseyside

1997–2010
- Seats: One
- Created from: Knowsley North, Crosby
- Replaced by: Knowsley, Sefton Central

Knowsley North and Sefton East was a county constituency represented in the House of Commons of the Parliament of the United Kingdom. It elected one Member of Parliament (MP) by the first past the post system of election.

== History ==
A primarily working-class industrial region, the seat was traditionally one of the strongest Labour-held seats in the country. The original Knowsley North constituency gained several wards from Crosby as a result of boundary changes in 1995. The constituency was represented throughout its existence by George Howarth (Labour), who had held the previous Knowsley North constituency from 1986.

== Boundaries ==
The Metropolitan Borough of Knowsley wards of Cantril Farm, Cherryfield, Kirkby Central, Knowsley Park, Northwood, Park, Tower Hill, and Whitefield, and the Metropolitan Borough of Sefton wards of Molyneux, Park, and Sudell.

The constituency covered the localities of Kirkby and Knowsley Village in Knowsley; Maghull, Lydiate, Lunt, Sefton Village, Ince Blundell, Waddicar and Melling and Aintree in Sefton.

It was bordered in the south by Knowsley South; in the west by Crosby; in the north by West Lancashire; in the southwest by Liverpool Walton, Liverpool West Derby, and Bootle and in the east by St Helens North and St Helens South.

Following decisions by the Boundary Commission for England, Knowsley North and Sefton East was abolished for the 2010 general election. This seat formed a small part of a new Knowsley seat, with the Crosby, Maghull and Formby elements moving into a new Sefton Central constituency.

== Members of Parliament ==
Election	Member	Party
1997	George Howarth	Labour
2010	constituency abolished: see Knowsley & Sefton Central	

== Elections ==
=== Elections in the 1990s ===
General election 1997: Knowsley North and Sefton East
Party	Candidate	Votes	%	±%
Labour	George Howarth	34,747	69.9	
Conservative	Carl Doran	8,600	17.3	
Liberal Democrats	David Bamber	5,499	11.1	
Socialist Labour	Chris Jones	857	1.7	
Majority		26,147	52.6	
Turnout		49,703	70.1	
Labour win (new seat)				

=== Elections in the 2000s ===
General election 2001: Knowsley North and Sefton East
Party	Candidate	Votes	%	±%
Labour	George Howarth	25,035	66.7	−3.2
Conservative	Keith Chapman	6,108	16.3	−1.0
Liberal Democrats	Richard Roberts	5,173	13.8	+2.7
Socialist Labour	Ronald Waugh	574	1.5	−0.2
Independent	Thomas Rossiter	356	0.9	New
Independent	David Jones	271	0.7	New
Majority		18,927	50.4	−2.2
Turnout		37,517	53.0	−17.1
Labour hold		Swing		

General election 2005: Knowsley North and Sefton East
Party	Candidate	Votes	%	±%
Labour	George Howarth	23,461	63.3	−3.4
Liberal Democrats	Flo Clucas	7,192	19.4	+5.6
Conservative	Naman Purewal	5,064	13.7	−2.6
BNP	Michael McDermott	872	2.4	New
Socialist Labour	Stephen Whatham	464	1.3	−0.2
Majority		16,269	43.9	−6.5
Turnout		37,053	52.6	−0.4
Labour hold		Swing	−4.5	

== See also ==
- List of parliamentary constituencies in Merseyside
