= George Howarth =

British politician (1949–2026)

The Right Honourable Sir George Howarth
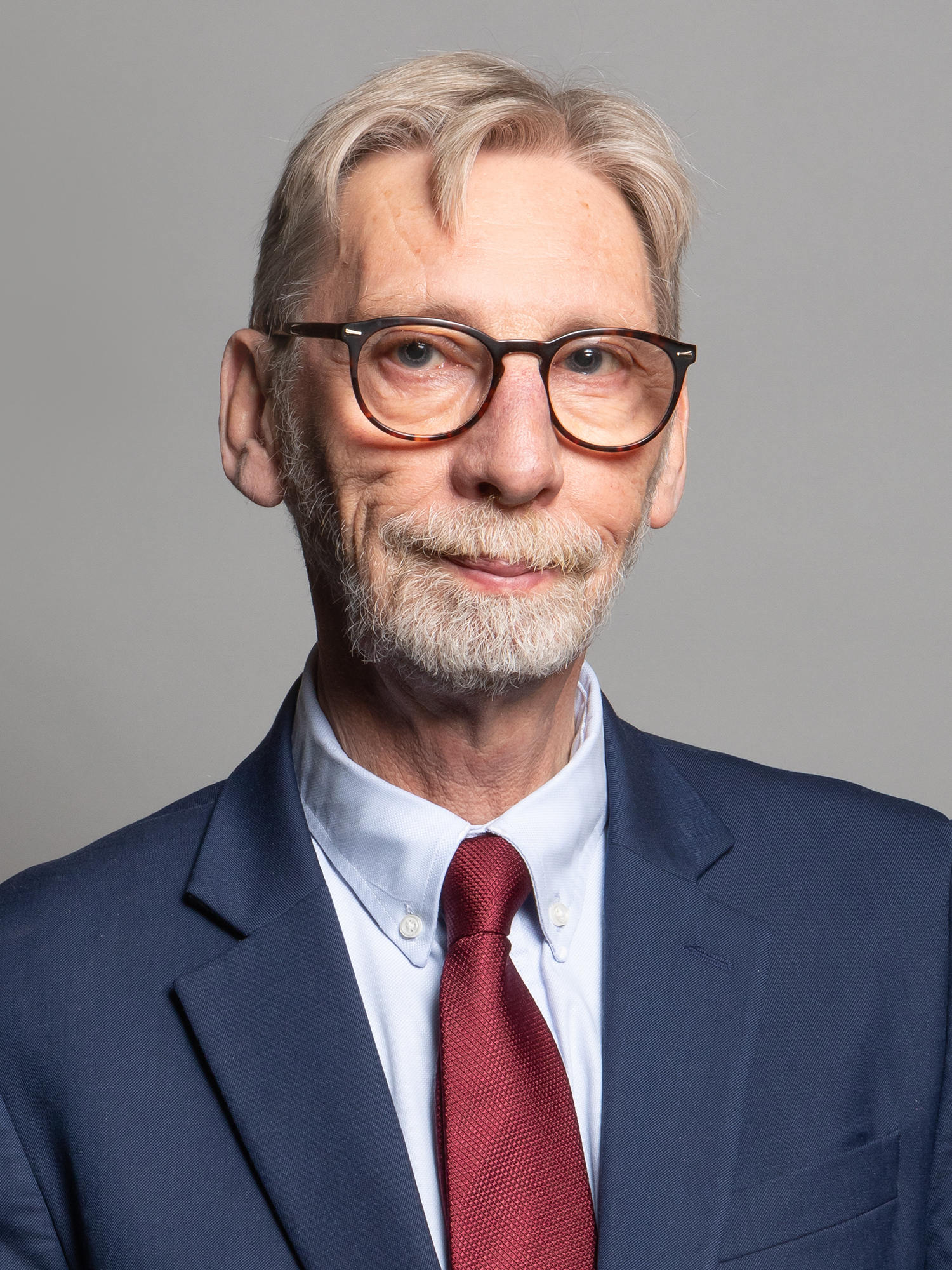
- Official portrait, 2020

Parliamentary Under-Secretary of State for Northern Ireland
- In office 29 July 1999 – 11 June 2001
- Prime Minister: Tony Blair
- Preceded by: The Lord Dubs
- Succeeded by: Des Browne

Parliamentary Under-Secretary of State for Home Affairs
- In office 5 May 1997 – 29 July 1999
- Prime Minister: Tony Blair
- Preceded by: Timothy Kirkhope
- Succeeded by: Charles Clarke

Member of Parliament for Knowsley Knowsley North and Sefton East (1997–2010) Knowsley North (1986–1997)
- In office 13 November 1986 – 30 May 2024
- Preceded by: Robert Kilroy-Silk
- Succeeded by: Anneliese Midgley

Personal details
- Born: George Edward Howarth; 29 June 1949 Prescot, Lancashire, England
- Died: 3 July 2026 (aged 77)
- Party: Labour
- Spouse(s): Julie, Lady Howarth
- Education: University of Salford
- Profession: Engineer
- Website: Official website

Sir George Edward Howarth (29 June 1949 – 3 July 2026) was a British Labour Party politician who served as the Member of Parliament (MP) for Knowsley, previously Knowsley North and Sefton East and Knowsley North, from 1986 to 2024. He served as a junior minister in Tony Blair's government between 1997 and 2001.

== Early life and career ==
Born in Prescot on 29 June 1949, Howarth was educated at the local Huyton Secondary School, the Kirkby College of Further Education, and the Liverpool Polytechnic. He went on to study at the University of Salford. He served his apprenticeship for four years from 1966 as an engineer, and then worked as an engineer until 1975, when he moved into teaching.

In 1980, he joined Cooperative Development Services, and in 1982, was appointed the Chief Executive at the Wales Cooperative Centre. He became the Chief Executive of the Wales TUC's Wales Co-operative Centre, a position he held before his election to the House of Commons.

Howarth was elected as a councillor to the Huyton District Council in 1971 and served in its successor the Knowsley Borough Council until 1986, becoming its deputy leader from 1982 to 1983. He was the chair of the Knowsley South Constituency Labour Party for four years from 1981.

== Parliamentary career ==
The sitting Labour MP for Knowsley North, Robert Kilroy-Silk, resigned from Parliament in 1986 mid term to follow a career with the BBC. In the by-election on 13 November 1986, Howarth was elected with a safe majority of 6,724, defeating Liberal candidate Rosie Cooper who would later become a fellow Labour MP. He subsequently became MP for Knowsley North & Sefton East in 1997 and Knowsley in 2010 as constituency boundaries were redrawn. In the 2017 general election, he received 85% of the vote, one of the greatest majorities for a British MP since the advent of universal suffrage.

Howarth served as an opposition spokesperson on Environment 1989–1994 and Home Affairs 1994–1997. In 1997, he was appointed Parliamentary Under Secretary of State at the Home Office, and in 1999 to the same position at the Northern Ireland Office. He left the government in 2001. He has served on a wide variety of select committees. He became a member of the Privy Council in 2005.

He helped to enact the modern postal voting system. By 1999, the system of postal and proxy voting for those unable to vote at polling stations was seen as cumbersome and complex. Howarth, as Minister of State at the Home Office, chaired the Working Party on Electoral Procedures, which recommended that: absent voting should be allowed on demand and that the application and voting procedures for absent voting should be simplified. The Representation of the People Act 2000 implemented the recommendations. The Representation of the People (England & Wales) Regulations 2001 introduced the changes to the absent voting arrangements from 16 February 2001. The main change was to allow postal voting on demand.

Howarth was appointed one of two temporary Deputy Speakers of the House after the 2015 Queens Speech, until the new deputy speakers were elected on 3 June 2015. Following the 2017 Queens Speech, Howarth again served until the new deputy speakers were elected on 28 June 2017 without standing for the position himself.

He supported Owen Smith in the failed attempt to replace Jeremy Corbyn in the 2016 Labour leadership election.

Howarth was knighted in the 2019 Birthday Honours. He briefly acted as First Deputy Chairman of Ways and Means at the start of the 2019 Parliament.

He announced in June 2023 that he would retire at the 2024 general election. He was succeeded as MP by Anneliese Midgley.

== Personal life and death ==
Howarth was the father of three children. In 2011, Howarth's daughter, Sián, died due to complications from Type 1 diabetes, at the age of 24.

He was the son in law of George Rodgers, Labour MP for Chorley 1974–79.

Howarth died on 3 July 2026, aged 77. The death was announced by the House of Commons Speaker Lindsay Hoyle on 6 July. Prime Minister Keir Starmer also paid tribute to him. His funeral was held at Prescot Parish Church on 20 July.

Parliament of the United Kingdom
Preceded by Robert Kilroy-Silk	Member of Parliament for Knowsley North; 1986–1997	Constituency abolished
New constituency	Member of Parliament for Knowsley North and Sefton East; 1997–2010	Constituency abolished
New constituency	Member of Parliament for Knowsley; 2010–2024	Succeeded by Anneliese Midgley
