= Robert Kilroy-Silk =

British politician and broadcaster (born 1942)

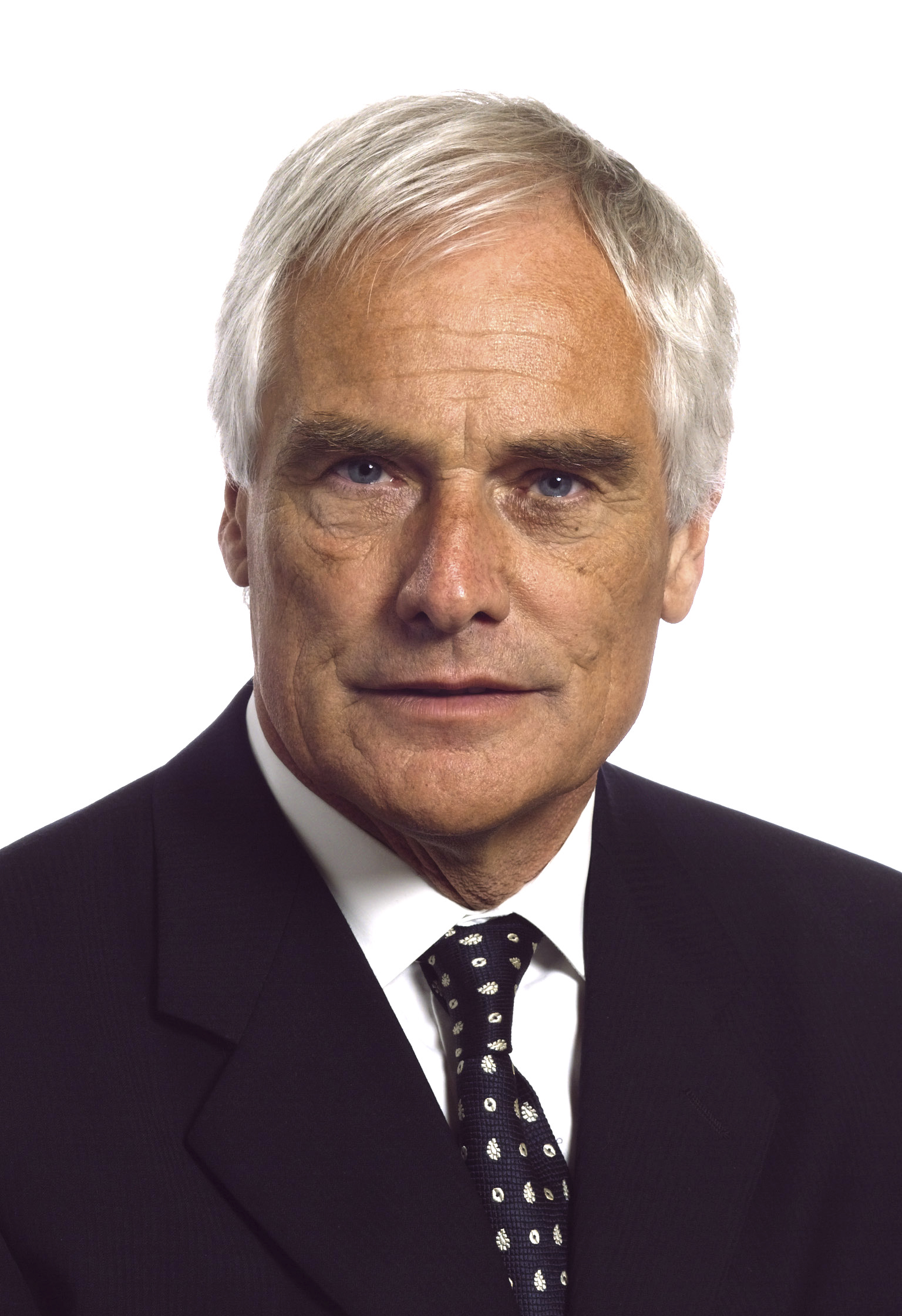
- Official portrait, 2004

Leader of Veritas
- In office 30 January 2005 – 29 July 2005
- Deputy: Damian Hockney
- Preceded by: Office created
- Succeeded by: Patrick Eston

Member of the European Parliament for the East Midlands
- In office 10 June 2004 – 4 June 2009
- Preceded by: Nick Clegg
- Succeeded by: Position abolished

Member of Parliament for Knowsley North
- In office 9 June 1983 – 1 October 1986
- Preceded by: Position established
- Succeeded by: George Howarth

Member of Parliament for Ormskirk
- In office 28 February 1974 – 13 May 1983
- Preceded by: Harold Soref
- Succeeded by: Position abolished

Personal details
- Born: Robert Michael Silk; 19 May 1942 (age 84) Birmingham, Warwickshire, England
- Party: Independent
- Other political affiliations: Labour (1974–1986); UKIP (2004–05); Veritas (2005)
- Spouse: Jan Beech (m. 1963)
- Education: London School of Economics
- Occupation: Television presenter

Robert Michael Kilroy-Silk (born Silk; born 19 May 1942) is an English former politician and broadcaster. After a decade as a university lecturer, he served as a Labour Party Member of Parliament (MP) from 1974 to 1986. He left the House of Commons in 1986 in order to present a new BBC Television daytime talk show, Kilroy, which ran until 2004. He returned to politics, serving as a Member of the European Parliament (MEP) from 2004 to 2009, initially as a member of the UK Independence Party (UKIP). He had a significant role in the mainstreaming of Eurosceptic politics in the UK and has been dubbed 'The Godfather of Brexit'.

== Early life ==
Kilroy-Silk was born in Birmingham, son of William Silk, a Royal Navy leading stoker, and his wife Minnie Rose (née Rooke). William Silk was lost at sea when aged 22, serving on HMS Charybdis, which was torpedoed and sunk off the coast of Brittany by German torpedo boats on 23 October 1943. His son was 17 months old.

Robert's mother Rose remarried in 1946, to family friend John Francis Kilroy, a car worker at the Rootes plant in Warwickshire. He adopted Robert, who from then used the surname Kilroy-Silk.

Kilroy-Silk failed his eleven-plus examination, for entry to selective schools, in 1953. He spent his first year at a secondary modern school and later passed the review exam and went to Saltley Grammar School in Saltley, Birmingham. He attended the London School of Economics to study politics and economics.

== Marriage and early career ==
In 1963, Kilroy-Silk married Jan Beech, daughter of a shop steward. The couple met when he was 18 and she was 17. They have a son and a daughter.

After graduation he became a lecturer in politics at the University of Liverpool, serving from 1966 to 1974. He published a theoretical work, Socialism since Marx, in 1972.

== Labour Member of Parliament ==
At the February 1974 general election, Kilroy-Silk was elected as a Labour MP for the Ormskirk constituency in Lancashire. He remained its MP until its abolition at the 1983 general election, when he was elected to represent the new Knowsley North seat; he held this until his resignation from the House of Commons in 1986. In an article for The Times in 1975, Kilroy-Silk argued that politics was not "compromises and bargains" or hankering after "a spurious consensus". He wrote that the function of government, particularly a Labour government, was

"to impose its values on society. Its role is creative: to cast, so far as it is able, society in its image". Furthermore, socialists should not be worried about being accused of dictatorial powers; they must go forward with "a tint of arrogance".

The next year he was quoted as saying, "the Labour Party must always be a class party, for it is a class war we are fighting".

Kilroy-Silk was appointed Shadow Home Affairs spokesman, resigning in 1985. In resigning his seat, he said that he had been assaulted by members of the Militant group and was reported to have had a scuffle with left-wing Labour MP Jeremy Corbyn. Kilroy-Silk wrote a book about his experiences, entitled Hard Labour, and subsequently left the Labour Party.

During his time as Labour MP, he was known as a "unapologetic nuisance" for "unfashionable" and "unpopular" causes such as penal reform, civil liberties and opposition to the tampon tax, as well as "rearguard action" against the Militant tendency; "his speeches were essentially invitations to pass him over for promotion", such as when "in one Budget debate, he accused James Callaghan’s government of following Tory orthodoxies on the economy".

== Television and journalism ==
=== Kilroy ===
His talk show Kilroy started on 24 November 1986. Originally called Day to Day, the programme was renamed to Kilroy in September 1987. It ran until 2004 when it was cancelled by the BBC in reaction to the publication of an article by Kilroy-Silk entitled "We owe Arabs nothing" which was published in the Sunday Express on 4 January 2004. This provoked considerable controversy.

=== Ireland ===
In 1992, Kilroy made a comment regarding Ireland in his Daily Express column, criticising Ray MacSharry, a former Irish government minister and EU commissioner, whom he described as "a redundant second-rate politician from a country peopled by priests, peasants and pixies". This was condemned by the then Irish ambassador to the UK, Joseph Small, for its "gratuitously offensive and indeed racist remarks". The newspaper's editor, Sir Nicholas Lloyd, apologised to MacSharry and the Irish people in general, while Kilroy added: "I accept that my references to Mr MacSharry and the Irish people were both offensive and unjustified, and I fully associate myself with this apology."

=== Shafted ===
In 2001, Kilroy-Silk hosted a television programme on ITV1 called Shafted. It was a quiz-show and at the end of the show, Kilroy-Silk would ask players whether they wished to "share" or to "shaft", with accompanying hand gestures.

The show was cancelled after four episodes, with sixteen recordings unaired, due to falling ratings. The Penguin TV Companion (2006) ranked it as the worst British television show of the 2000s.

=== We owe Arabs nothing ===
The BBC cancelled the Kilroy show in January 2004 after an opinion article, entitled "We owe Arabs nothing", by Kilroy-Silk was published in the Sunday Express on 4 January 2004. The article had first been published in April 2003 by the same paper and 'republished in error' according to Kilroy-Silk. It did not attract much national attention when first published. According to Faisal Bodi, a columnist for The Guardian, the reaction at its second publication was a measure of "the increasing organisation of the Muslim community". Bodi added:

Kilroy-Silk's suspension was precipitated by a flurry of web messages and emails circulated by various Muslim organisations notifying people of the outrage. The circulars from the Muslim Public Affairs Committee, the Muslim Council of Britain, the Islamic Human Rights Commission and the Islamic Affairs Central Network, to mention a few, were focused, informative and, above all, empowering. They contained a chronology of Kilroyisms, names and contacts of editors at the BBC and the Sunday Express, and instructions on how to make complaints. In the end, the BBC was left with little choice.

Bodi wrote that Kilroy-Silk should be prosecuted for incitement to racial hatred. He said that Kilroy-Silk had also written statements critical of Muslims in 1989, during the Salman Rushdie affair, and in a 1995 article in the Daily Express. The article was also strongly criticised by the Commission for Racial Equality, whose head, Trevor Phillips, said that the affair could have a "hugely unhelpful" effect.

By contrast, Ibrahim Nawar, the head of Arab Press Freedom Watch, came out in support of Kilroy-Silk in a Daily Telegraph article. He said the politician was "an advocate of freedom of expression" and that he agreed with much of what Kilroy-Silk had said about Arab regimes.

A spokeswoman for Kilroy-Silk told The Observer, "He is not a racist at all – he employs a black driver", a quote which is sometimes incorrectly attributed to Kilroy-Silk.

== Eurosceptic politics ==
=== UKIP ===
In 2004, Kilroy-Silk was recruited to the UK Independence Party (UKIP). During that year's European Parliament election campaign he presented one of the party political broadcasts. His recruitment and celebrity significantly raised the profile of the party, further helped by his enlisting of actress Joan Collins who attended a UKIP press conference at Kilroy-Silk's invitation.

==== Election to the European Parliament ====
Kilroy-Silk stood on the UKIP list for the East Midlands constituency in 2004 and was elected as a Member of the European Parliament (MEP) in the second seat for his region. The election used a closed list form of proportional representation; UKIP scored 26.05 per cent of the vote in that region, just behind the Conservatives with 26.39 per cent.

==== Leadership challenge ====
In the 2004 Hartlepool by-election, UKIP came third, ahead of the Conservative Party. The next day, in an interview on Breakfast with Frost (BBC), Kilroy-Silk expressed ambition to lead UKIP and criticised the party's leader Roger Knapman.

Following this, businessman and friend Paul Sykes announced his intention to cease his partial funding of UKIP and to return his support to the Conservatives, as he feared that the Eurosceptic vote might be split. The branch chairmen of UKIP were canvassed on their opinion regarding Kilroy-Silk's challenge for the party leadership. Only a minority (13%) were sympathetic to him; Kilroy-Silk did not think this was significant, as he believed that too few party members had been consulted. Party officials threatened him with disciplinary action if he continued his challenge.

On 27 October 2004, Kilroy-Silk officially announced that he had withdrawn from the UKIP whip in the European Parliament, branding the party "incompetent". But, he said that he would remain as an independent member of UKIP, and would continue to challenge for the leadership.

UKIP's constitution states that 70 days' notice is required before a leadership ballot can take place. With the next general election in the UK expected in spring 2005, Kilroy-Silk pushed for an emergency general meeting of the party as early as possible.

On 3 December 2004 at about 7.15 p.m., Kilroy-Silk was attacked outside Manchester High School for Girls, when a bucket of manure was thrown over him as he arrived for a recording of the BBC Radio 4's Any Questions. In February 2005, a 37-year-old man from Cheshire who threw the manure over Kilroy-Silk was given a conditional discharge at Manchester magistrates court after pleading guilty to three charges of causing criminal damage and one public order offence. Kilroy-Silk subsequently stated: "As a result of an unprovoked attack, I am now very apprehensive about future public appearances and worried about my personal safety. I dread to think what the consequences could have been if the person had been in possession of a knife or other lethal weapon."

On 20 January 2005, Kilroy-Silk announced that he had left UKIP; he had been a member for nine months.

=== Veritas ===
On 30 January 2005 Kilroy-Silk launched a new political party Veritas, promising to take the fight to the "supercilious metropolitan elite". Damian Hockney, UKIP's leader in the London Assembly, had defected to Veritas, becoming its first Deputy Leader.

UKIP members and some journalists dubbed Kilroy-Silk's new party "Vanitas", meaning a party acting as a vehicle for its founder's vanity.

On 31 January 2005, a television programme, Kilroy: Behind the Tan, was broadcast on the BBC. Created in documentary style, it followed the politician from his election as an MEP for UKIP to his leaving the party.

The party was formally launched on 2 February 2005 at Hinckley Golf Club in Hinckley, Leicestershire.

In early February 2005, Kilroy-Silk worked on a Channel 4 television programme called Kilroy and the Gypsies. He spent a week living with a family of Romany Gypsies at a campsite in Bedfordshire to explore their lives. He also interviewed residents of surrounding villages.

In the 2005 general election, Kilroy-Silk contested the seat of Erewash, but came in fourth with 5.8%, just above the 5% level needed to save his deposit. He tried to press charges against a man who, he said, "smashed a bottle of water against the side of his head" while the politician was being interviewed by a European television crew outside a supermarket. The alleged assailant said he had squirted Kilroy-Silk with water from a plastic bottle before running away; this account was confirmed by the TV crew, which also filmed the incident. The police decided not to prosecute.

On 12 July 2005, party member Ken Wharton announced his intention to challenge Kilroy-Silk for the leadership, claiming party members were "not being looked after". Discontented party members set up the Veritas Members' Association to "put the truth back into Veritas".

On 29 July 2005, Veritas announced the resignation of Kilroy-Silk as party leader. In his resignation statement, he said:

"It was clear from the general election result – and more recently that of the Cheadle by-election – that the electors are content with the old parties and that it would be virtually impossible for a new party to make a significant impact given the nature of our electoral system. We tried and failed."

In August 2005, four of the MEPs for the East Midlands region (Clark, Heaton-Harris, Helmer and Whitehead) sent a joint letter to President of the European Parliament Josep Borrell complaining about Kilroy-Silk:

"He seems to have done little or no work as a constituency MEP for the East Midlands. This leaves five MEPs to do the work of six and the electorate have been short-changed". They went on to complain that Kilroy-Silk was not "fulfilling the pledge he made on becoming an MEP, to serve the electorate of his region" and to call for him to "either do the job for which he is paid, or get out and leave it to those who can."

The European Parliament does not have any power to expel a member, and Borrell took no action.

Kilroy-Silk, who was elected to the European Parliament on the UKIP list, remained a member of the Veritas Party, but sat as an independent MEP. Some Veritas members were reported to have questioned why he was allowed to continue as a party member.

In November 2008 Derek Clark MEP complained that Kilroy-Silk was taking his parliamentary wage while being paid to appear in the 2008 edition of the reality TV show I'm a Celebrity... Get Me Out of Here!. In his opinion the TV show represented a conflict of interest. Kilroy-Silk was the first contestant to be voted out.

Kilroy-Silk's name was absent from the list of candidates published on 7 May 2009 for the 2009 European Parliament election. His membership was terminated when the European Parliament reconvened on 17 July 2009.

On 7 November 2009, he appeared as a panellist on the BBC's Question Time programme.

== Retirement ==
In 2019, Kilroy-Silk was described as "retired" and living in the outskirts of Plymouth.

European Parliament
Preceded by unknown	Member of European Parliament for East Midlands; 2004 – 2009	Succeeded by unknown
Parliament of the United Kingdom
Preceded by Harold Soref	Member of Parliament for Ormskirk; 1974–1983	Constituency abolished
New constituency	Member of Parliament for Knowsley North; 1983–1986	Succeeded by George Howarth
Party political offices
New political party	Leader of Veritas; 2005	Succeeded by Patrick Eston
