= Knowsley North =

UK Parliament constituency (1983–1997)

- Former borough constituency for the House of Commons
- County: Merseyside

1983–1997
- Seats: One
- Created from: Huyton, Ormskirk
- Replaced by: Knowsley North and Sefton East, Knowsley South

Knowsley North was a borough constituency represented in the House of Commons of the Parliament of the United Kingdom from 1983 until 1997. It elected one Member of Parliament (MP) by the first past the post voting system.

== History ==
The constituency was a safe seat for the Labour Party throughout its existence. Originally, it was represented by Robert Kilroy-Silk, who resigned in 1986 to pursue a media career. This resignation prompted a by-election, which was won by George Howarth.

== Boundaries ==
The Metropolitan Borough of Knowsley wards of Cantril Farm, Cherryfield, Kirkby Central, Knowsley Park, Northwood, Park, Prescot East, Prescot West, Tower Hill, and Whitefield.

The constituency covered the northern part of the metropolitan borough of Knowsley, principally the town of Kirkby. Following a review by the Boundary Commission for England in 1995, the constituency was expanded at the 1997 general election to form the new Knowsley North and Sefton East constituency.

== Members of Parliament ==
| Election | Member | Party | Notes |
|---|---|---|---|
| 1983 | Robert Kilroy-Silk | Labour | Previously MP for Ormskirk from 1974. Resigned October 1986 |
| 1986 by-election | George Howarth | Labour | Elected in November 1986 by-election. Subsequently, MP for Knowsley North and Sefton East from 1997 |
| 1997 | constituency abolished: see Knowsley North and Sefton East & Knowsley South | | |

== Elections ==
=== Elections in the 1980s ===
General election 1983: Knowsley North
| Party | Candidate | Votes | % | ±% |
|---|---|---|---|---|
| Labour | Robert Kilroy-Silk | 24,949 | 64.5 | |
| Conservative | Albert Birch | 7,758 | 20.1 | |
| SDP | Barry McColgan | 5,715 | 14.8 | |
| Workers Revolutionary | John Simons | 246 | 0.6 | |
| Majority | | 17,191 | 44.46 | |
| Turnout | | 38,668 | 69.54 | |
| Labour win (new seat) | | | | |

- Kilroy-Silk resigned on 1 October 1986, to pursue a media career.

By-election 1986: Knowsley North
| Party | Candidate | Votes | % | ±% |
|---|---|---|---|---|
| Labour | George Howarth | 17,403 | 56.3 | −8.2 |
| Liberal | Rosie Cooper | 10,679 | 34.6 | +19.8 |
| Conservative | Roger Brown | 1,960 | 6.3 | −13.8 |
| Revolutionary Communist | David Hallsworth | 664 | 2.1 | N/A |
| Rainbow Dream Ticket | George Weiss | 111 | 0.4 | New |
| Independent | Robert Cory | 88 | 0.3 | New |
| Majority | | 6,724 | 21.7 | −22.7 |
| Turnout | | 30,905 | 57.3 | −12.2 |
| Labour hold | | Swing | −14.0 | |
| Registered electors | | 53,921 | | |

General election 1987: Knowsley North
| Party | Candidate | Votes | % | ±% |
|---|---|---|---|---|
| Labour | George Howarth | 27,454 | 69.9 | +5.4 |
| Liberal | Rosie Cooper | 6,356 | 16.2 | +1.4 |
| Conservative | Roger Brown | 4,922 | 12.5 | −7.6 |
| Red Front | David Hallsworth | 538 | 1.4 | New |
| Majority | | 21,098 | 53.7 | +9.2 |
| Turnout | | 39,270 | 74.2 | +4.7 |
| Labour hold | | Swing | | |

=== Elections in the 1990s ===
General election 1992: Knowsley North
| Party | Candidate | Votes | % | ±% |
|---|---|---|---|---|
| Labour | George Howarth | 27,517 | 77.5 | +7.6 |
| Conservative | Simon Mabey | 5,114 | 14.4 | +1.9 |
| Liberal Democrats | James Murray | 1,515 | 4.3 | −11.9 |
| Liberal | Kathleen Lappin | 1,180 | 3.3 | New |
| Natural Law | Veeva Ruben | 179 | 0.5 | New |
| Majority | | 22,403 | 63.1 | +9.4 |
| Turnout | | 35,505 | 72.8 | −1.4 |
| Labour hold | | Swing | +2.9 | |

== See also ==
- 1986 Knowsley North by-election

== Sources ==
- Britain Votes/Europe Votes By-Election Supplement 1983-, compiled and edited by F.W.S. Craig (Parliamentary Research Services 1985)
