= Parliamentary constituencies in Cheshire =

From 2024, the ceremonial county of Cheshire (which comprises the unitary authorities of Cheshire West and Chester, Cheshire East, Halton and Warrington) is divided into twelve parliamentary constituencies; one borough constituency, and 11 county constituencies. Two constituencies (Ellesmere Port and Bromborough, and Widnes and Halewood) are partly in the county of Merseyside.

== Constituencies ==
† Conservative ‡ Labour ¤ Reform UK

Constituency (Note: BC denotes borough constituency, CC denotes county constituency.)	Electorate	Majority (Note: The majority is the number of votes the winning candidate receives more than their nearest rival.)	Member of Parliament	Nearest opposition	Electoral wards	Map
Chester North and Neston CC	70,215	11,870	Samantha Dixon‡	Simon Eardley†	Cheshire West and Chester Council: Blacon, Chester City and the Garden Quarter, Great Boughton, Little Neston, Neston, Newton and Hoole, Parkgate, Saughall and Mollington, Upton, Willaston and Thornton.	
Chester South and Eddisbury CC	74,284	3,057	Aphra Brandreth†	Angeliki Stogia‡	Cheshire East Council: Audlem, Bunbury, Wrenbury, Wybunbury. Cheshire West and Chester Council: Christleton and Huntington, Farndon, Handbridge Park, Lache, Malpas, Tarporley, Tarvin and Kelsall, Tattenhall, Weaver and Cuddington.	
Congleton CC	74,243	3,387	Sarah Russell‡	Fiona Bruce†	Cheshire East Council: Alsager, Brereton Rural, Congleton East, Congleton West, Dane Valley, Odd Rode, Sandbach Elworth, Sandbach Ettiley Heath and Wheelock, Sandbach Heath and East, Sandbach Town.	
Crewe and Nantwich CC	78,423	9,727	Connor Naismith‡	Ben Fletcher†	Cheshire East Council: Crewe Central, Crewe East, Crewe North, Crewe South, Crewe St. Barnabas, Crewe West, Haslington, Leighton, Nantwich North and West, Nantwich South and Stapeley, Shavington, Willaston and Rope, Wistaston.	
Ellesmere Port and Bromborough BC	70,799	16,908	Justin Madders‡	Michael Aldred¤	Cheshire West and Chester Council: Central and Grange, Ledsham and Manor, Netherpool, Strawberry, Sutton Villages, Westminster, Whitby Groves, Whitby Park, Wolverham. Wirral Council: Bromborough, Eastham.	
Macclesfield CC	76,416	9,120	Tim Roca‡	David Rutley†	Cheshire East Council: Bollington, Broken Cross and Upton, Disley, Gawsworth, Macclesfield Central, Macclesfield East, Macclesfield Hurdsfield, Macclesfield South, Macclesfield Tytherington, Macclesfield West and Ivy, Poynton East and Pott Shrigley, Poynton West and Adlington, Prestbury, Sutton.	
Mid Cheshire CC	70,384	8,927	Andrew Cooper‡	Charles Fifield†	Cheshire East Council: Middlewich. Cheshire West and Chester Council: Davenham, Moulton and Kingsmead, Hartford and Greenback, Northwich Leftwich, Northwich Winnington and Castle, Northwich Witton, Rudheath, Winsford Dene, Winsford Gravel, Winsford Over and Verdin, Winsford Swanlow, Winsford Wharton	
Runcorn and Helsby CC	71,955	6; 2025 by-election	Sarah Pochin¤	Karen Shore‡	Cheshire West and Chester Council: Frodsham, Gowy Rural, Helsby, Sandstone. Halton Borough Council: Beechwood and Heath, Bridgewater, Daresbury, Moore and Sandymoor, Grange, Halton Castle, Halton Lea, Mersey and Weston, Norton North, Norton South and Preston Brook.	
Tatton CC	75,978	1,136	Esther McVey†	Ryan Jude‡	Cheshire East Council: Alderley Edge, Chelford, Handforth, High Legh, Knutsford, Mobberley, Wilmslow Dean Row, Wilmslow East, Wilmslow Lacey Green, Wilmslow West and Chorley. Cheshire West and Chester Council: Marbury, Shakerley. Warrington Borough Council: Lymm North and Thelwall (polling districts SNA, SNB, SPA, SPB and SPC), Lymm South.	
Warrington North CC	70,601	9,190	Charlotte Nichols‡	Trevor Nicholls¤	Warrington Borough Council: Birchwood, Burtonwood and Winwick, Culcheth, Glazebury and Croft, Fairfield & Howley, Orford, Poplars and Hulme, Poulton North, Poulton South, Rixton and Woolston, Westbrook.	
Warrington South CC	78,399	11,340	Sarah Hall‡	Andy Carter†	Warrington Borough Council: Appleton, Bewsey and Whitecross, Chapelford and Old Hall, Grappenhall, Great Sankey North and Whittle Hall, Great Sankey South, Latchford East, Latchford West, Lymm North and Thelwall (polling districts SNC, SND, SNE and SNF), Penketh and Cuerdley, Stockton Heath.	
Widnes and Halewood CC	70,161	16,425	Derek Twigg‡	Jake Fraser¤	Halton Borough Council: Appleton, Bankfield, Birchfield, Central and West Bank, Ditton, Hale Village and Halebank, Farnworth, Halton View, Highfield, Hough Green. Knowsley Metropolitan Borough Council: Halewood North, Halewood South, Whiston and Cronton (polling districts WC1, WC1A, WC2, WC3 and WC4).	

== Boundary changes ==
=== 2024 ===
See 2023 Periodic Review of Westminster constituencies for further details.

Former name
1. City of Chester CC
2. Congleton CC
3. Crewe and Nantwich CC
4. Eddisbury CC
5. Ellesmere Port and Neston CC
6. Halton CC
7. Macclesfield CC
8. Tatton CC
9. Warrington North BC
10. Warrington South BC
11. Weaver Vale CC
Boundaries 2010-2024

2010-2024 constituencies in Cheshire

Current name
1. Chester North and Neston CC
2. Chester South and Eddisbury CC
3. Congleton CC
4. Crewe and Nantwich CC
5. Ellesmere Port and Bromborough BC
6. Macclesfield CC
7. Mid Cheshire CC
8. Tatton CC
9. Runcorn and Helsby CC
10. Warrington North CC
11. Warrington South CC
12. Widnes and Halewood CC
Boundaries 2024–present

2024-present constituencies in Cheshire

For the 2023 Periodic Review of Westminster constituencies, which redrew the constituency map ahead of the 2024 United Kingdom general election, the Boundary Commission for England opted to combine Cheshire with Merseyside as a sub-region of the North West Region, with the creation of two cross-county boundary constituencies of Ellesmere Port and Bromborough, and Widnes and Halewood, which avoided the need for a constituency spanning the River Mersey. As a consequence, there were significant changes in the west of the county. The town of Neston was transferred from Ellesmere Port and Neston to City of Chester, resulting in these constituencies being replaced by Ellesmere Port and Bromborough, and Chester North and Neston respectively. Halton was abolished, with the majority of the seat being included in the new constituency of Widnes and Halewood, and the remainder in the new constituency of Runcorn and Helsby. Eddisbury and Weaver Vale were both abolished, being largely replaced by Chester South and Eddisbury, and Runcorn and Helsby, respectively. Mid Cheshire was created as a new constituency which did not contain a majority of any previous seat, being composed of minority portions of the former Eddisbury, Weaver Vale, Congleton and Tatton.

The following constituencies were proposed and adopted:

Containing electoral wards from Cheshire East

- Chester South and Eddisbury (part)
- Congleton
- Crewe and Nantwich
- Macclesfield
- Mid Cheshire (part)
- Tatton (part)

Containing electoral wards from Cheshire West and Chester

- Chester North and Neston
- Chester South and Eddisbury (part)
- Ellesmere Port and Bromborough (part also in the Merseyside borough of Wirral)
- Mid Cheshire (part)
- Runcorn and Helsby (part)

Containing electoral wards from Halton

- Runcorn and Helsby (part)
- Widnes and Halewood (part also in the Merseyside borough of Knowsley)

Containing electoral wards from Warrington

- Tatton (part)
- Warrington North
- Warrington South

=== 2010 ===
Following the Fifth Periodic Review of Westminster Constituencies by the Boundary Commission for England, the existing 11 constituencies were retained with changes to realign constituency boundaries with the boundaries of current local government wards, and to reduce the electoral disparity between constituencies. These changes were implemented at the 2010 United Kingdom general election.

Name
1. City of Chester CC
2. Congleton CC
3. Crewe and Nantwich CC
4. Eddisbury CC
5. Ellesmere Port and Neston CC
6. Halton CC
7. Macclesfield CC
8. Tatton CC
9. Warrington North BC
10. Warrington South BC
11. Weaver Vale CC
Boundaries 1997-2010

Parliamentary constituencies in Cheshire (1997-2010)

Boundaries 2010–2024

Parliamentary constituencies in Cheshire (2010-2024)

== Results history ==
Primary data source: House of Commons research briefing - General election results from 1918 to 2019

=== 2024 ===
The number of votes cast for each political party who fielded candidates in constituencies in Cheshire in the 2024 general election were as follows:

Party	Votes	%	Change from 2019	Seats	Change from 2019
Labour	252,726	45.9%	▲6.4%	10	▲5
Conservative	135,749	24.7%	▼21.7%	2	▼4
Reform UK	90,090	16.4%	▲13.9%	0	0
Liberal Democrats	34,774	6.3%	▼2.7%	0	0
Greens	29,250	5.3%	▲2.9%	0	0
Others	7,970	1.4%	▲1.2%	0	0
Total	550,558	100.0		12	

=== 2019 ===
The number of votes cast for each political party who fielded candidates in constituencies comprising Cheshire in the 2019 general election were as follows:

Party	Votes	%	Change from 2017	Seats	Change from 2017
Conservative	267,127	46.4%	▲1.2%	6	▲2
Labour	227,481	39.5%	▼8.1%	5	▼2
Liberal Democrats	51,665	9.0%	▲4.8%	0	0
Greens	13,872	2.4%	▲1.4%	0	0
Brexit	14,287	2.5%	new	0	0
Others	1,426	0.2%	▼1.8%	0	0
Total	575,858	100.0		11	

=== Percentage votes ===
Election year	1983	1987	1992	1997	2001	2005	2010	2015	2017	2019	2024
Labour	29.7	34.4	39.1	46.5	46.3	40.5	32.4	36.6	47.6	39.5	45.9
Conservative	45.6	44.8	44.7	33.4	35.6	37.1	40.7	43.0	45.2	46.4	24.7
Liberal Democrat^{1}	24.4	20.6	15.3	12.3	15.6	20.3	21.2	5.6	4.2	9.0	6.3
Green Party	-	*	*	*	*	*	0.5	2.6	1.0	2.4	5.3
UKIP	-	-	-	*	*	*	2.6	11.9	1.4	*	-
Reform UK^{2}	-	-	-	-	-	-	-	-	-	2.5	16.4
Other	0.2	0.3	0.9	7.8	2.5	2.0	2.5	0.2	0.6	0.2	1.4

^{1}1983 & 1987 - SDP-Liberal Alliance

^{2}2019 - Brexit Party

* Included in Other

=== Seats ===
Election year	1983	1987	1992	1997	2001	2005	2010	2015	2017	2019	2024
Labour	3	3	5	7	7	7	3	4	7	5	10
Conservative	7	7	5	3	4	4	8	7	4	6	2
Independent^{1}		-	-	1	-	-	-	-	-	-	-
Total	10	10	10	11	11	11	11	11	11	11	12

^{1}Martin Bell, MP for Tatton.

=== Maps ===
==== 1885–1910 ====
1885

1886

1892

1895

1900

1906

Jan 1910

Dec 1910

==== 1918–1945 ====
1918

1922

1923

1924

1929

1931

1935

1945

==== 1950–1979 ====
1950

1951

1955

1959

1964

1966

1970

Feb 1974

Oct 1974

1979

==== 1983–present ====
1983

1987

1992

1997

2001

2005

2010

2015

2017

2019

2024

== Historical representation by party ==
A cell marked → (with a different colour background to the preceding cell) indicates that the previous MP continued to sit under a new party name.

=== 1885 to 1918 ===
Conservative Labour Liberal Liberal-Labour Liberal Unionist

Constituency	1885	86	1886	87	1892	93	94	1895	00	1900	05	1906	Jan 1910	10	Dec 1910	12	13	16
Altrincham	J. Brooks	W. Brooks			Disraeli							Crossley			Kebty-Fletcher		Hamilton	
Birkenhead	Hamley				Keppel		Lees					Vivian			Bigland			
Chester	Foster		Yerburgh									Mond	Yerburgh					Philipps
Crewe	Latham		McLaren					Ward		Tomkinson				McLaren		Craig		
Eddisbury	Tollemache											Stanley	Barnston					
Hyde	Ashton		Sidebotham							Chapman		Schwann	Neilson					Jacobsen
Knutsford	Egerton											King	Sykes					
Macclesfield	W. C. Brocklehurst		Bromley-Davenport									W. B. Brocklehurst						
Northwich	J. T. Brunner		Verdin	J. T. Brunner									J. F. Brunner					
Stalybridge	Sidebottom									Ridley	Cheetham		Wood					
Stockport	Jennings					Whiteley			→	Leigh		Duckworth	Hughes					
Stockport	Tipping		Gedge		Leigh			Melville				Wardle						
Wirral	Cotton-Jodrell									Hoult		Lever	Stewart					

=== 1918 to 1950 ===
Coalition Labour Coalition Liberal (1918–22) / National Liberal (1922–23) Common Wealth Conservative Independent Labour Liberal National Liberal (1931–68)

Constituency	1918	20	1922	1923	1924	25	29	1929	31	1931	33	1935	37	39	40	42	43	44	45	1945
Altrincham / Altrincham and Sale (1945)	Hamilton			Alstead	Atkinson						Grigg									Erroll
Bucklow																				Shepherd
Birkenhead East	Bigland		White		Stott			White												Soskice
Birkenhead West	Grayson		Stott	Egan	Nuttall			Egan		Allen										Collick
Chester	Philipps		Cayzer												Nield					
Crewe	Davies		Hemmerde		Craig			Bowen		Somervell										Allen
Eddisbury	Barnston						Russell		→								Loverseed	→	→	Barlow
Knutsford	Sykes		Makins																	Bromley-Davenport
Macclesfield	Remer													Weston						Harvey
Northwich	Dewhurst		Crichton-Stuart																	Foster
Stalybridge and Hyde	Wood		Rhodes	Tattersall	Wood			Lawrie		Hope		Dunne	Trevor-Cox							Lang
Stockport	Wardle	Greenwood				Townend				Dower		Gridley								
Stockport	Hughes	Fildes		Royle	Hammersley							Hulbert								
Wallasey	McDonald		Chadwick							Moore-Brabazon						Reakes				Marples
Wirral	Stewart			Dodds	Grace					Clayton		Graham								Lloyd

=== 1950 to 1983 ===
Conservative Labour Liberal Social Democratic Speaker

Constituency	1950	1951	55	1955	56	1959	1964	65	1966	1970	71	Feb 1974	Oct 1974	76	79	1979	81	Destination
Altrincham and Sale	Erroll							Barber					Montgomery					Greater Manchester
Bebington / & Ellesmere Port (1974)	Oakshott						Howe		Brooks	Cockeram		Bates				Porter		Cheshire, Merseyside
Birkenhead	Collick						Dell									Field		Merseyside
Cheadle	Shepherd								Winstanley	Normanton								Greater Manchester, Cheshire
Chester	Nield				Temple							Morrison						Cheshire
Crewe	Allen											Dunwoody						Cheshire
Hazel Grove												Winstanley	Arnold					Greater Manchester
Knutsford	Bromley-Davenport									Davies					Bruce-Gardyne			Cheshire
Macclesfield	Harvey										Winterton							Cheshire
Nantwich				Grant-Ferris								Cockcroft				Bonsor		Cheshire
Northwich	Foster											Goodlad						Cheshire
Runcorn	Vosper						Carlisle											Cheshire
Stalybridge and Hyde	Lang	Blackburn								Pendry								Greater Manchester
Stockport North	Hulbert						Gregory			Owen		Bennett						Greater Manchester
Stockport South	Gridley		Steward				Orbach									McNally	→	Greater Manchester
Wallasey	Marples											Chalker						Merseyside
Wirral	Lloyd										→			Hunt				Merseyside

=== 1983 to 2024 ===
Conservative Independent Labour Liberal Democrats

Constituency	1983	1987	1992	1997	99	2001	2005	08	2010	2015	2017	19	2019	22
City of Chester	Morrison		Brandreth	Russell					Mosley	Matheson				Dixon
Congleton	Winterton								Bruce					
Crewe and Nantwich	Dunwoody							Timpson			Smith		Mullan	
Eddisbury	Goodlad				O'Brien					Sandbach		→	Timpson	
Ellesmere Port and Neston	Woodcock		Miller							Madders				
Halton	Oakes			Twigg										
Macclesfield	Winterton								Rutley					
Tatton	Hamilton			Bell		Osborne					McVey			
Warrington South	Carlisle	Butler	Hall	Southworth					Mowat		Rashid		Carter	
Warrington North	Hoyle			Jones									Nichols	
Weaver Vale				Hall					Evans		Amesbury			

=== 2024 to present ===
Conservative Independent Labour Reform UK

Constituency	2024	24	25
Chester North and Neston	Dixon		
Chester South and Eddisbury	Brandreth		
Congleton	Russell		
Crewe and Nantwich	Naismith		
Ellesmere Port and Bromborough ^{1}	Madders		
Macclesfield	Roca		
Mid Cheshire	Cooper		
Runcorn and Helsby	Amesbury	→	Pochin
Tatton	McVey		
Warrington South	Hall		
Warrington North	Nichols		
Widnes and Halewood ^{1}	Twigg		

^{1}contains areas of Merseyside

== See also ==
- Parliamentary constituencies in North West England
- Constituencies of the Parliament of the United Kingdom
- History of parliamentary constituencies and boundaries in Cheshire
