= Rhodes baronets =

Baronetcy in the Baronetage of the United Kingdom

The Rhodes Baronetcy, of Hollingworth in the County Palatine of Chester, is a title in the Baronetage of the United Kingdom. It was created on 29 May 1919 for George Rhodes. He was a justice of the peace for Cheshire. The second baronet was chairman of Thomas Rhodes, cotton spinners and manufacturers, and represented Stalybridge and Hyde in the House of Commons as a Conservative from 1922 to 1923. The third baronet was an actor, appearing in, among other films, The Colditz Story (1955)

== Rhodes baronets, of Hollingworth (1919) ==
- Sir George Rhodes, 1st Baronet (3 September 1860 – 5 February 1924)
- Sir John Phillips Rhodes, 2nd Baronet (19 July 1884 – 14 November 1955)
- Sir Christopher George Rhodes, 3rd Baronet (30 April 1914 – 22 June 1964), film and television actor
- Sir John Christopher Douglas Rhodes, 4th Baronet (born 24 May 1946)

The heir presumptive is the current Baronet's brother Michael Philip James Rhodes (born 1948). There is no further heir to the title.
