= Glossopdale School =

Location
- Newshaw Lane; Hadfield, Derbyshire, SK13 2DA; England; 53.456232°N 1.971190°W

Information
- Type: Academy
- Established: 1942
- Local authority: Derbyshire
- Trust: The True Learning Partnership
- Department for Education URN: 147157 Tables
- Ofsted: Reports
- Chair: J. Soboljew
- Principal: Kate Smith
- Gender: Mixed
- Age: 11 to 19
- Enrolment: 1012
- Website: http://www.glossopdale.school

Glossopdale School is a mixed secondary school and sixth form located in Hadfield, Derbyshire, England.

== History ==
The school used to be the Glossop Grammar School from the 1920s, being on Talbot Road since 1959, becoming Glossop Comprehensive School in 1965 when it merged with West End Secondary Modern (on Sunlaws Street and Chadwick Street and opened in 1913 as Glossop Independent Council School), and Castle School Secondary Modern in Hadfield.

In 1989, the former Hadfield Comprehensive School on Newshaw Lane in Hadfield merged with the Glossop School to form the Glossopdale School. The Chadwick Street site is next to the St Philip Howard RC Academy (Glossop's other secondary school) on St Mary's Road.

As Glossopdale Community College, the school was awarded specialist Arts College status in September 2005, and also International Schools Status in July 2010. It is a member of the Peak 11 Learning Federation.

In 2017 Glossopdale Community College started to build a new purpose-built school on the playing fields of the Hadfield site. The new building would cater for all year groups and end the split site system that operated for nearly three decades. The school officially opened on 7 June 2018 after four years of planning and this coincided with a name change for the school to Glossopdale School.

The old school buildings in Hadfield have been demolished to create new playing fields for the new school. The Talbot Road school buildings were demolished in Spring 2021, land associated with the Glossop site on Cemetery Road became a community sports facility and Fauval Road site has been mothballed, with the land becoming overgrown.

Previously a community school administered by Derbyshire County Council, in December 2020 Glossopdale School converted to academy status. The school is now sponsored by the True Learning Partnership.

== Admissions ==
Until 2018, the school was spread over three sites; Hadfield, Glossop and Talbot House. The youngest students attended Hadfield site on Newshaw Lane, Hadfield. When the students moved into Year 9 they moved to Glossop Site on Talbot Road, Glossop. There was also a Sixth Form College in the historic 19th-century Talbot House, also on Talbot Road. In 2016 construction began on a new building on the Hadfield site, designed to merge all three previous sites into one building, which opened in 2018. The school was part of a successful pilot scheme, and subsequently offers C3 – a combined humanities curriculum – to Years 7 and 8. Glossopdale has also taken part in several teachers' television documentaries. Debbie McGloin was appointed as the headteacher in 2018, replacing Steven Playford.

In June 2018, the new school building was opened to students and to the public. The new building includes facilities, from a community room to a large multi-use sports hall.

In 2022, Glossopdale saw the completion of the new Extension Building, a new building with eight classrooms over two floors, and a new multi-use sports ground. Since the extension was built, admission capacity increased by 35 students per year group.

== In literature and popular culture ==
=== Music Department ===
Glossopdale Community College has a music department, which reflects the school's status as a Performing Arts College. It has a large selection of bands as well as the choirs. There is a Big Band, Wind Band, Brass Band, Samba Band, Flutz (a Flute ensemble) and Training Band. During the 1970s and 1980s particularly, Glossop School Brass Band were an internationally renowned band, producing several LPs and touring Europe and the United States.

The Music Department takes part in a number of concert tours abroad, the most recent of which were in Paris, Salzburg, and Barcelona.

=== All the Small Things ===
Glossopdale Community College has a choir. Over the years, the choir has performed at festivals and won awards; they have also made appearances on BBC television series All the Small Things in 2008.

=== Teachers TV ===
Glossopdale Community College has been the focus of a couple of TV documentaries for the now defunct government funded Teachers TV. A program titled Making Connections explores revolutionary teaching at the KS3 level. A second program titled Special Needs, Inclusion takes an inside look at how Glossopdale Community College takes an active approach to helping students with additional and special education needs.

=== A Monster Calls ===
The 2016 film A Monster Calls includes scenes filmed in the now demolished Talbot Road site.

== Academic performance ==
The school was given an overall effectiveness rating of 'Good' in their most recent Ofsted inspection, which took place in November 2023.

In 2012, 58% of pupils gained five A* to C GCSE grades including English and Maths, a 20% improvement over four years. 87% of pupils achieved five A* to C grades. In 2016, the Progress 8 score for the school's GCSE results was -0.23; this is below the average Progress 8 for schools in England. The 2016 A-Level results had a progress score of -0.13, which is in line with the national average, and the average grade achieved was C.

== Notable former pupils ==
- Peter Goodwright
- David Hargreaves (actor)
- Sydney Hope, Conservative MP from 1931 to 1935 for Stalybridge and Hyde
- James Hurst CBE, president in 1935 of the Institute of British Foundrymen (Institute of Cast Metals Engineers)
- Frederick Rowbottom, mathematician
- Harold Fletcher (botanist), Regius Keeper of the Royal Botanic Garden Edinburgh from 1956 to 1970
- Prof Thomas Walker, professor of industrial biochemistry from 1956 to 1958 at the University of Manchester
- Stuart Hall
- Matt Taylor, music producer on Frank Turner album FTHC.
