= Frederick Blackburn =

Frederick Blackburn may refer to:

- Fred Blackburn (1902–1990), British Labour politician, Member of Parliament for Stalybridge and Hyde 1951–1970
- Fred Blackburn (footballer) (1878–1951), English association footballer who played for Blackburn Rovers and West Ham United
- Frédéric Blackburn (born 1972), Canadian double-olympic silver medalist (1992) in short track speed skating
