= Christopher Rhodes =

English actor (1914–1964)

- Rhodes in The Colditz Story (1955)
- Born: 30 April 1914; Alverstone, Isle of Wight
- Died: 22 June 1964 (aged 50); Blakeney, Norfolk

Sir Christopher George Rhodes, 3rd Baronet (30 April 1914 – 22 June 1964) was an English film and television actor. He was awarded the French Croix de Guerre for services 1940-41 and the United States Legion of Merit for his World War II service.

== Early life ==
Rhodes was born in Alverstone, Isle of Wight, the only son of Sir John Rhodes, 2nd Baronet, and attended Eton College and Magdalen College, Oxford. During the Second World War, he served with the Essex Regiment of the British Army, reaching the rank of lieutenant-colonel in British Intelligence as Deputy Controller, Political, Economic and Special Intelligence in Berlin (see national archives military records, service number 152753).

== Career ==
Rhodes began his acting career after the war. His best known and largest role was as 'Mac' McGill in The Colditz Story (1955). Television appearances include The Quatermass Experiment, Danger Man, Dixon of Dock Green and The Saint.

== Personal life ==
Rhodes was married twice, first to Mary Kesteven in 1936, whom he divorced in 1942, and then to Mary Florence Wardleworth in 1943, who bore him two sons and a daughter. He succeeded to his father's baronetcy in 1955.

== Death ==
Rhodes died at his home in Blakeney, Norfolk, on 22 June 1964, aged 50.

== Selected filmography ==
- Moulin Rouge (1952) (uncredited)
- Laughing Anne (1953) as Escort No. 1
- Betrayed (1954) as Chris
- Gravelhanger (1954)
- The Colditz Story (1955) as 'Mac' McGill
- The Feminine Touch (1956) as Dr Ted Russell
- Tiger in the Smoke (1956) as Chief Inspector Luke
- Ill Met by Moonlight (1957) as General Bräuer (uncredited)
- The Naked Earth (1958) as Al
- Dunkirk (1958) as Sergeant on the beaches
- Wonderful Things! (1958) as Codger
- Operation Amsterdam (1959) as Alex
- The Lady Is a Square (1959) as Greenslade
- Tiger Bay (1959) as Inspector Bridges
- John Paul Jones (1959) as Ringleader
- Shake Hands with the Devil (1959) as Colonel Smithson
- A Terrible Beauty (1960) as Tim Malone
- Gorgo (1961) as McCartin
- The Guns of Navarone (1961) as German Gunnery Officer
- El Cid (1961) as Don Martín
- The Piper Pune (1962) as Captain
- Lancelot and Guinevere (1963) as Ulfus, aka Sword of Lancelot (USA)
- The Cracksman (1963) as Mr. King
- Becket (1964) as Baron (final film role)

Baronetage of the United Kingdom
Preceded by John Phillips Rhodes	Baronet (of Hollingworth); 1955–1964	Succeeded by John Christopher Douglas Rhodes
