= Idris Owen =

British Conservative Party politician

Idris Wyn Owen (18 February 1912 – 21 December 2003) was a British Conservative Party politician, and Member of Parliament (MP) for Stockport North 1970–74.

== Biography ==
Owen was educated at Stockport School and College, and Manchester School of Commerce (forerunner of Manchester Metropolitan University). He became a director of a building and civil engineering company. He was a fellow of the Institute of Builders and vice-president of the National Federation of Building Trades Employers, 1965. He served as a councillor on Stockport Borough Council from 1946 and chaired the housing committee.

Owen contested Manchester Exchange in 1951, came close in Stalybridge and Hyde in 1955 and first stood in Stockport North in 1966. He was elected in Stockport North in the 1970 general election but was defeated by just 203 votes by Labour's Andrew Bennett in the February 1974 general election. He stood again in the October 1974 general election but lost by a larger margin.

Owen lived in The Old Rectory, Gawsworth, Cheshire for much of his life, later moving to Prestbury, where he died in 2002 aged 91. He and his wife Eileen had two children.

== Election results ==
=== Manchester Exchange, 1951 ===
18,475 William Griffiths (Labour)
14,881 Idris Owen (Conservative)

Majority: 3,594

=== Stalybridge and Hyde, 1955 ===
23,617 Fred Blackburn (Labour)
23,462 Idris Owen (Conservative)

Majority: 155

=== Stockport North, 1966 ===
21,598 Arnold Gregory (Labour)
18,262 Idris Owen (Conservative)

Majority: 3,336

=== Stockport North, 1970 ===
Idris Owen (Conservative)
Arnold Gregory (Labour)

=== Stockport North, February 1974 ===
16,948 Andrew Bennett (Labour)
16,745 Idris Owen (Conservative)
9,283 Peter Arnold (Liberal)

Majority: 203

=== Stockport North, October 1974 ===
17,979 Andrew Bennett (Labour)
16,155 Idris Owen (Conservative)
7,085 Peter Arnold (Liberal)

Majority: 1,824

Parliament of the United Kingdom
Preceded by Arnold Gregory	Member of Parliament for Stockport North; 1970–1974	Succeeded by Andrew Bennett
