= High Peak =

High Peak or High Peaks may refer to:

== Places ==
- High Peak, Derbyshire, a borough in Derbyshire, England
  - High Peak Borough Council, local council of above borough
  - High Peak (UK Parliament constituency)
- High Peak Estate, an area of Pennine moorland near High Peak Borough (above)
- High Peak Junction, Cromford, location of former railway workshops
- High Peaks (Maine), USA
- High Peaks Wilderness Area, a Forest Preserve unit in New York, USA

=== Mountains and hills ===
- High Peak (upland), another name for the Dark Peak uplands in the Peak District of England
- High Peak, Devon, a partially eroded hill in Devon, UK
- High Peak (Broadwater County, Montana) in Broadwater County, Montana
- High Peak (Jefferson County, Montana) in Jefferson County, Montana
- Kaaterskill High Peak, Greene County, New York, USA
- Adirondack High Peaks
- Catskill High Peaks
- High Peak, another name for the Mount Tapulao in Philippines

== Other ==
- High Peak Radio, a local radio station for above borough
- High Peak Trail, a walking trail in Derbyshire, England
- High Peak (bus company), a bus company in Derbyshire, England
