= Gordon Lang =

Welsh politician and Congregationalist minister (1893–1981)

The Reverend Gordon Lang

Member of Parliament for Oldham
- In office 1929–1931 Serving with James Wilson
- Preceded by: William Wiggins; Duff Cooper
- Succeeded by: Anthony Crommelin Crossley; Hamilton Kerr

Member of Parliament for Stalybridge and Hyde
- In office 1945–1951
- Preceded by: Horace Trevor-Cox
- Succeeded by: Fred Blackburn

Personal details
- Born: 25 February 1893 Monmouth, Wales
- Died: 20 June 1981 (aged 88) Chepstow
- Party: Labour
- Education: Cheshunt College
- Profession: Minister of religion

Gordon Lang (25 February 1893 – 20 June 1981) was a Welsh Congregationalist minister and Labour Party politician. He was Member of Parliament (MP) for Oldham from 1929 until 1931, and for Stalybridge and Hyde from 1945 until 1951. He was related to his namesake, Cosmo Gordon Lang, who was Archbishop of Canterbury at the time Gordon Lang was first elected to parliament.

Lang was born in Monmouth, and attended the town's grammar school and Cheshunt College. He combined his pastoral work with political activity including being the honorary secretary of the United Europe Movement and a leading member of the Proportional Representation Society.

== MP for Oldham ==
In 1929 he was nominated as one of two Labour candidates for the two-seat Oldham constituency along with James Wilson. The general election saw a large swing to the Labour Party, and Lang and Wilson were elected, unseating the two sitting members (one Conservative and one Liberal.)

Following the collapse of the second minority Labour Government and the formation of a National Government, a further general election was held in 1931. Lang and Wilson defended their seats against two National Government candidates, but were heavily defeated. Lang stood at Oldham again at the next general election in 1935, but failed to regain the seat for Labour.

== MP for Stalybridge and Hyde ==
In 1937, Philip Dunne, the Conservative MP for Stalybridge and Hyde retired due to ill health. Lang was chosen to contest the ensuing byelection, which was a straight fight with Horace Trevor-Cox, Conservative and National Government candidate. Lang came close to winning the seat, reducing the Conservatives' majority from the 1935 general election of 5,081 votes to just 334.

With the outbreak of the Second World War in 1939, elections were postponed. It was not until 1945 that another general election was held. Lang and Trevor-Cox were again the candidates of the Labour and Conservative parties respectively, joined by a Liberal candidate, Donald Burden. The 1945 general election resulted in a Labour landslide victory, where the first majority Labour government was formed, and Lang was comfortably elected with a majority of 4,370 votes. He retained the seat at the next general election in 1950. The result of the election was a reduced Labour majority, and another general election was called in 1951 to increase it. Lang announced that he would not contest the election due to ill health, and retired from the House of Commons.

== After politics ==
Lang continued in his ministry, and was appointed chaplain to the Showmen's Guild of Great Britain. He died at his home in Chepstow in June 1981, aged 88.

Parliament of the United Kingdom
Preceded by William Wiggins and Duff Cooper	Member of Parliament for Oldham; 1929–1931; With: James Wilson	Succeeded by Anthony Crommelin Crossley and Hamilton Kerr
Preceded by Horace Trevor-Cox	Member of Parliament for Stalybridge and Hyde; 1945–1951	Succeeded by Fred Blackburn
