= Sydney Hope =

British solicitor and politician

Sydney Hope (1905 – 20 December 1959) was a British solicitor and politician, who represented Stalybridge and Hyde for the Conservative Party between 1931 and 1935.

Hope was educated at Glossop grammar school and then Ellesmere College, a small Anglo-Catholic boarding school, before training as a solicitor. He qualified in 1930, and practiced in Manchester.

In October 1930, Hope was adopted as the Conservative prospective parliamentary candidate for Stalybridge and Hyde, and contested it at the 1931 general election. The seat had been traditionally Conservative, but had been taken by Edmund Walter Hanbury Wood, a Labour candidate, at the previous general election. He did not, however, stand for re-election, and as part of an overall Conservative landslide victory, Hope took the seat with a comfortable majority of 13,300 votes over the Liberal and Labour candidates. At 26, he was one of the youngest members of parliament elected that year; the Baby of the House, Roland Robinson, was only two years younger.

He did not make his maiden speech until 1934, when he objected to proposals to move Cheadle and Gatley into Greater Manchester.

Hope did not run for re-election at the 1935 general election, though in May 1935 it was reported that he was considering looking for a safer seat. In 1950, he was appointed a Justice of the Peace.

Parliament of the United Kingdom
Preceded by Hugh Hartley Lawrie	Member of Parliament for Stalybridge and Hyde; 1931 – 1935	Succeeded by Philip Dunne
