= Gillian Bennett =

British folklorist (1939–2023)

- Born: Gillian Lawly; 25 September 1939
- Died: 13 December 2023 (aged 84)
- Education: University of Sheffield (MA)
- Spouse: Andrew Bennett (m. 1961)
- Children: 2 sons and 1 daughter

Gillian Bennett (née Lawley; 25 September 1939 – 13 December 2023) was a British folklorist, known for her work on contemporary legends.

== Early life and education ==
Bennett was born on 25 September 1939. She enrolled as a mature graduate student at the University of Sheffield in 1978, where she studied at the Centre for English Cultural Tradition and Language (CECTAL) under the supervision of J. D. A. Widdowson. She gained both masters and doctoral degrees, and would retain ties to CECTAL as an honorary research associate.

Bennett's PhD thesis was titled Aspects of supernatural belief, memorate and legend in a contemporary urban environment and "aimed to move away from the antiquarian bias of previous work on the folklore of the supernatural in order to shed light on present day attitudes and concepts".

== Contemporary legend research ==
In 1982, CECTAL hosted a conference on Contemporary Legend. This initiated a number of succeeding conferences on the topic, leading to the creation in 1988 of the International Society for Contemporary Legend Research (ISCLR).

Bennett was a founder member of ISCLR, as was Paul Smith, a fellow University of Sheffield graduate. In collaboration with Smith, Bennett edited four of the five-volume Perspectives on Contemporary Legend essay series (1984–1990), which were based on the Sheffield Contemporary Legend conferences. She also co-wrote with Smith Contemporary Legend: The First Five Years (1990), co-compiled Contemporary Legend: A Folklore Bibliography (1993), co-edited Contemporary Legend: A Reader (1996) and co-authored Urban Legends: A Collection of International Tall Tales and Terrors (2007).

ISCLR has been described as of great significance "not just to legend studies but to also to the fortunes of English folklore scholarship in general" and seen in the 1990s as "probably the most prominent evidence of England's re-emergence as a major contributor to world folklore scholarship".

== Nature and significance of work ==
Bennett's two major published works are Traditions of Belief: Women and the Supernatural (1987) – which was expanded into Alas, Poor Ghost! Traditions of belief in story and discourse in 1999 – and Bodies: Sex, Violence, Disease and Death in Contemporary Legend (2005) and have been described as "essential to the contemporary legend canon".

Traditions of Belief grew from Bennett's PhD research on contemporary ghost beliefs and examined the rhetorical strategies of the tellers. In Bennett's word, "to see whether ... [supernatural] beliefs would be expressed in narrative form".

In review following its publication, Bodies was hailed as "an excellent exploration of contemporary folklore" and "truly remarkable scholarship".

Her books have been described as "radically contesting the older scholarly tendency to assume that legends are necessarily "believed fictions". By revealing the robust belief structures behind legend complexes, Bennett clarified how legends reflected dynamic cultural attitudes on many important issues: on death and dying, on health, and especially on gendering and childbirth".

As well as being the author of these titles and a number of academic papers, Bennett also served as the editor of the journal Folklore from 1994 to 2004.

== Recognition ==
In 2014 – alongside Paul Smith – Bennett was awarded the inaugural Lifetime Achievement Linda Degh Award by the International Society for Contemporary Legend Research.

In 2018, Bennett was awarded the Coote Lake Medal, the Folklore Society's prize for recognising "outstanding research and scholarship".

== Personal life and death ==
In 1961, she married Andrew Bennett in Manchester. They had a daughter and two sons. Gillian Bennett died on 13 December 2023, at the age of 84.

== Selected publications ==
Author

- Bennett, Gillian (1986). "Narrative as Expository Discourse". The Journal of American Folklore. 99 (394): 415–434. doi:10.2307/540046. ISSN 0021-8715.
- Bennett, Gillian (1987). Traditions of belief: women and the supernatural. London: Penguin Books. ISBN 978-0-14-022800-7. OCLC 246656943.
- Bennett, Gillian (1989). ""Belief Stories": The Forgotten Genre". Western Folklore. 48 (4): 289–311. doi:10.2307/1499544. ISSN 0043-373X.
- Bennett, Gillian (1996). "The Thomsian Heritage in the Folklore Society (London)". Journal of Folklore Research. 33 (3): 212–220. ISSN 0737-7037.
- Bennett, Gillian (1998). "The Vanishing Hitchhiker at Fifty-Five". Western Folklore. 57 (1): 1–17. doi:10.2307/1500246. ISSN 0043-373X.
- Bennett, Gillian. (1999). Alas, poor ghost!: Traditions of belief in story and discourse. Logan, Utah: Utah State University Press.
- Bennett, Gillian (2005). Bodies: sex, violence, disease, and death in contemporary legend. Jackson, Miss.: University Press of Mississippi. ISBN 978-1-57806-789-3. OCLC 57752376.

Editor

- Bennett, Gillian; Smith, Paul (1990). Contemporary legend: the first five years: abstracts and bibliographies from the Sheffield Conferences on contemporary legend, 1982–1986. Sheffield: Sheffield Academic Press. ISBN 978-1-85075-191-5. OCLC 805577367.
- Bennett, Gillian; Smith, Paul (1993). Contemporary legend: a folklore bibliography. New York: Garland. ISBN 978-0-8240-6103-6. OCLC 925386548.
- Bennett, Gillian; Smith, Paul (1996). Contemporary legend: a reader. New York: Garland. ISBN 978-0-8153-1317-5. OCLC 925259637.
- Bennett, Gillian; Smith, Paul (2007). Urban legends: a collection of international tall tales and terrors. Westport, Conn.: Greenwood Press. ISBN 978-0-313-33952-3. OCLC 76864037.
