= 1937 Stalybridge and Hyde by-election =

UK Parliamentary by-election

The 1937 Stalybridge and Hyde by-election was held on 28 April 1937. The by-election was held due to the resignation of the incumbent Conservative MP, Philip Dunne. It was won by the Conservative candidate Horace Trevor-Cox.

The Labour candidate, the Reverend Gordon Lang was the former MP for Oldham and in the 1945 general election won the seat on a large swing.

Stalybridge and Hyde by-election, 1937
Party	Candidate	Votes	%	±%
Conservative	Horace Trevor-Cox	21,901	50.4	−5.1
Labour	Gordon Lang	21,567	49.6	+5.1
Majority		334	0.8	−10.3
Turnout		43,468		
Conservative hold		Swing		
