= Walter Fowden =

British politician

Walter Fowden (1878 – 21 May 1949) was a British politician and swimmer.

Born in Hyde, then in Cheshire, Fowden joined the local swimming club. In 1895 he was one of four youths whom the club fined for misbehaviour. They refused to pay the fine, and instead founded the rival Hyde Seal Swimming Club, with Fowden as secretary. The club proved successful, and by 1904 Fowden was competing for it in Paris. The event was regarded as an unofficial world championship, and the Seals won the 500m competition.

Fowden became a hotel owner, and also joined the Independent Labour Party (ILP). He was elected to Hyde Borough Council by 1913, representing Werneth ward. During World War I, he was a conscientious objector, and a founding member of the No Conscription Fellowship.

The ILP was affiliated to the Labour Party, for which Fowden stood in Stalybridge and Hyde at the 1918 United Kingdom general election, taking 24.8% of the vote and second place. He stood again at the 1924 United Kingdom general election, increasing his share to 33.7%. In 1922, he served as Mayor of Hyde.

Although Fowden was again adopted to contest the Parliamentary seat at the next general election [1929], he stood down in 1926, stating that business and domestic commitments left him with insufficient time to devote to the necessary wokk. He remained president of the Cheshire County Water Polo, and continued to serve on the local council for some years.
