= Gravelhanger =

1954 British TV series

Gravelhanger is a British television six-part series which first aired in 1954. It was described in Radio Times as "the story of an adventure". Broadcast live, it is unknown if the series was telerecorded. Either way, the series is missing, believed lost.

The show starred Peter Coke, Olaf Pooley, Ursula Howells, Christopher Rhodes, Jean Cadell, James Raglan, and Esme Percy.
