= The Naked Earth =

1958 film by Vincent Sherman

- Theatrical release poster
- Directed by: Vincent Sherman
- Written by: Milton Holmes; Harold Buchman
- Produced by: Adrian D. Worker
- Starring: Richard Todd; Juliette Gréco; John Kitzmiller; Finlay Currie; Laurence Naismith; Christopher Rhodes
- Cinematography: Erwin Hillier
- Edited by: Russell Lloyd
- Music by: Arthur Benjamin
- Production companies: Foray Films; Four Square Productions
- Distributed by: 20th Century Fox
- Release dates: February 4, 1958 (United Kingdom); June 1958 (United States)
- Running time: 96 minutes
- Country: United Kingdom
- Language: English

The Naked Earth is a 1958 British drama film directed by Vincent Sherman and written by Milton Holmes and Harold Buchman. The film stars Richard Todd, Juliette Gréco, John Kitzmiller, Finlay Currie, Laurence Naismith and Christopher Rhodes. The film was released on February 4, 1958, by 20th Century Fox.

== Plot ==
The action takes place at the end of the nineteenth century, in East Africa. Danny Halloran, a disappointed Irish farmer but a good African meat hunter, comes to find his friend, ex-seaman and now tobacco farmer in his jungle retreat, but fails to do so. He discovers that the farmer died - a victim of the crocodiles - leaving a widow, Maria. Danny falls in love with the young woman and decides to marry her to please Father Finlay Currie and to manage the tobacco plantation. When the harvest fails, he goes hunting for crocodiles to trade their skins.

== Cast ==
- Richard Todd as Danny
- Juliette Gréco as Maria
- John Kitzmiller as David
- Finlay Currie as Father Verity
- Laurence Naismith as Skin Trader
- Christopher Rhodes as Al
- Orlando Martins as Tribesman
- Harold Kasket as Arab Captain

== Production ==
Executive Arthur Abeles had worked with Vincent Sherman on The Hasty Heart. He showed the script to Sherman in London and the director liked it. Sherman later wrote in his memoirs, "I felt that out of this story I could get a film similar to some of the French and Italian classics that I had seen in the thirties, which were down to earth, dramatic, and filled with honest humor. Moreover, the story especially appealed to me because it followed, to some degree, the pattern of my own marriage: Hedda and I worked together, raised a family, and loved each other, despite my lapses of unfaithful behavior. We also argued incessantly."

Sherman took the project to Robert Clark of Associated British who agreed to make the film if Sherman could get his name "cleared" - he was politically suspect at the time due to his leftist beliefs. Sherman was eventually able to do this. However Clark was not able to offer the money that the film required. Instead the film was sold to 20th Century Fox; head of British productions was Robert Goldstein.

It was the first of three films Adrian Worker made for his own company in association with 20th Century Fox. Worker said filming proceeded smoothly and was completed on time and on budget.

The lead role was originally offered to Richard Burton who turned it down. It was then offered to Richard Todd, who had worked with Sherman on The Hasty Heart and had signed a four-picture deal with 20th Century Fox; Todd liked the script and agreed to make it. The female lead was offered to Joan Collins who turned it down. Darryl F. Zanuck, former head of Fox and now a producer, suggested Sherman cast his then-mistress, Juliette Greco; Sherman watched footage of Greco in The Sun Also Rises and agreed.

Filming took place on location in Uganda and at Elstree Studios in London. According to Todd "the film was obviously turning out well" but "an unpleasant schism was developing between" Vincent Sherman "and the producer, who was also the screenwriter, and relations between them grew progressively worse. The atmosphere on the set became very strained, with Vince doing his best to be patient during some of their arguments but obviously resenting the interference with his plans for editing and cutting the picture." According to Todd Darryl Zanick arrived in London in October and took over editing. "Brilliant film-maker though he was, this was not one of Darryl’s most inspired efforts, as the film became ponderous in places and in the end was not as good as it deserved to be."

Sherman's memoirs do not mention a clash with a producer, but admit that Zanuck took over editing. Sherman wrote "It was edited as though it was intended to be a fast-moving melodrama rather than a simple, realistic love story that depended for its success on its characters and their struggle to conquer the African background."

== Reception ==
The film was a commercial disappointment.
