= Martin Dunne (Lord Lieutenant) =

Sir Martin Dunne, KCVO (born 1938) is a British public servant.

Educated at Eton College and Christ Church, Oxford, he is the son of the politician Philip Dunne, MC, and brother of Sir Thomas Raymond Dunne (himself the father of Philip Dunne, another politician).

Dunne served as High Sheriff of Warwickshire for the 1982–83 year and was appointed a deputy lieutenant for the county in 1993. In 1997, he was appointed Lord Lieutenant of Warwickshire and served in the office until 2010, when he retired.

On retirement as lord lieutenant, he was appointed a Knight Commander of the Royal Victorian Order.
