= Denton and Reddish =

UK Parliament constituency (1983–2024)

Coordinates: 53°26′16″N 2°09′35″W

- Former borough constituency for the House of Commons
- Boundary of Denton and Reddish in Greater Manchester

- Location of Greater Manchester within England
- County: Greater Manchester
- Electorate: 65,684 (December 2010)
- Major settlements: Denton, Reddish, Dukinfield, Audenshaw

1983–2024
- Seats: One
- Created from: Manchester Gorton, Stockport North and Stockport South
- Replaced by: Gorton and Denton

Denton and Reddish was a constituency (Note: A borough constituency (for the purposes of election expenses and type of returning officer)) represented in the House of Commons of the UK Parliament. It was last represented by Andrew Gwynne of the Labour Party. (Note: As with all constituencies, the constituency elects one Member of Parliament (MP) by the first past the post system of election at least every five years.)

The seat was abolished before the 2024 general election.

== Boundaries ==
Map of boundaries 1997-2024

The constituency most recently consisted of an electorate of about 65,500 in eastern Greater Manchester. In historic terms, and in terms of distinct settlements, it covers the former townships of Audenshaw, Denton, Dukinfield, Haughton Green, Heaton Chapel, Heaton Norris and Reddish.

1983–1997: The Metropolitan Borough of Tameside wards of Audenshaw, Denton North East, Denton South, and Denton West, and the Metropolitan Borough of Stockport wards of Brinnington, Reddish North, and Reddish South.

1997–2024: The Metropolitan Borough of Tameside wards of Audenshaw, Denton North East, Denton South, Denton West, and Dukinfield, and the Metropolitan Borough of Stockport wards of Reddish North and Reddish South.

== History ==
Before the seat's creation in 1983 Reddish was part of the marginal Stockport North; the large Brinnington council estate (now in part bought under right to buy) was in the Labour safe seat of Stockport South; and Audenshaw and Denton formed the core of Manchester Gorton. Before it was added to this seat in 1997, Dukinfield was part of Stalybridge and Hyde.

Historically both Audenshaw and Denton West wards returned Conservative councillors, but this has not occurred since 1992 and 1987 respectively.

In the 2005 provisional recommendations of the Boundary Commission's Fifth Periodic Review, Reddish was to be repatriated with the Stockport constituency. Denton, Audenshaw and Dukinfield would have been joined with Droylsden East, Droylsden West and the St Peter's, Ashton-under-Lyne wards of Tameside to form a Denton constituency, wholly in Tameside. However, following a public inquiry into Greater Manchester's constituencies held in late 2005, changes to the original proposals for the county were made. It was recommended that the Denton and Reddish seat should remain unchanged, with slight readjustments to reflect the new ward boundaries introduced in 2004. The new parliamentary boundaries in Greater Manchester took effect at the 2010 general election.

== Abolition ==
Further to the completion of the 2023 Periodic Review of Westminster constituencies, the seat will be abolished for the 2024 general election, with its contents distributed three ways:

- Denton combined with the City of Manchester wards of Burnage, Gorton and Abbey Hey, Levenshulme and Longsight, to form the new constituency of Gorton and Denton
- Reddish transferred to Stockport
- Audenshaw and Dukinfield transferred to Ashton-under-Lyne

== Members of Parliament ==
| Election | Member | Party |
|---|---|---|
| 1983 | Andrew Bennett | Labour |
| 2005 | Andrew Gwynne | Labour |

== Elections ==
=== Elections in the 2010s ===
General election 2019: Denton and Reddish
| Party | Candidate | Votes | % | ±% |
|---|---|---|---|---|
| Labour | Andrew Gwynne | 19,317 | 50.1 | ―13.4 |
| Conservative | Iain Bott | 13,142 | 34.1 | +6.1 |
| Brexit Party | Martin Power | 3,039 | 7.9 | New |
| Liberal Democrats | Dominic Hardwick | 1,642 | 4.3 | +2.1 |
| Green | Gary Lawson | 1,124 | 2.9 | +1.7 |
| Monster Raving Loony | Farmin Lord F'Tang F'tang Dave | 324 | 0.8 | +0.3 |
| Majority | | 6,175 | 16.0 | ―19.5 |
| Turnout | | 38,588 | 58.3 | ―2.8 |
| Registered electors | | 66,234 | | |
| Labour hold | | Swing | ―9.7 | |

General election 2017: Denton and Reddish
| Party | Candidate | Votes | % | ±% |
|---|---|---|---|---|
| Labour | Andrew Gwynne | 25,161 | 63.5 | +12.7 |
| Conservative | Rozila Kana | 11,084 | 28.0 | +4.3 |
| UKIP | Josh Seddon | 1,798 | 4.5 | ―14.2 |
| Liberal Democrats | Louise Ankers | 853 | 2.2 | ―0.3 |
| Green | Gareth Hayes | 486 | 1.2 | ―2.6 |
| Monster Raving Loony | Farmin Lord Dave 1st of Haughton | 217 | 0.5 | New |
| Majority | | 14,077 | 35.5 | +8.3 |
| Turnout | | 39,599 | 61.1 | +3.0 |
| Registered electors | | 65,751 | | |
| Labour hold | | Swing | +4.2 | |

General election 2015: Denton and Reddish
| Party | Candidate | Votes | % | ±% |
|---|---|---|---|---|
| Labour | Andrew Gwynne | 19,661 | 50.8 | ―0.2 |
| Conservative | Lana Hempsall | 9,150 | 23.7 | ―1.2 |
| UKIP | Andrew Fairfoull | 7,225 | 18.7 | +13.2 |
| Green | Nick Koopman | 1,466 | 3.8 | New |
| Liberal Democrats | Mark Jewell | 957 | 2.5 | ―14.9 |
| Independent | Victoria Lofas | 222 | 0.6 | New |
| Majority | | 10,511 | 27.1 | +1.0 |
| Turnout | | 38,681 | 58.1 | 0.0 |
| Registered electors | | 66,141 | | |
| Labour hold | | Swing | +0.5 | |

General election 2010: Denton and Reddish
| Party | Candidate | Votes | % | ±% |
|---|---|---|---|---|
| Labour | Andrew Gwynne | 19,191 | 51.0 | ―7.6 |
| Conservative | Julie Searle | 9,360 | 24.9 | +6.7 |
| Liberal Democrats | Stephen Broadhurst | 6,727 | 17.9 | +1.3 |
| UKIP | William Robinson | 2,060 | 5.5 | +2.5 |
| Independent | Jeff Dennis | 297 | 0.8 | New |
| Majority | | 9,831 | 26.1 | ―14.3 |
| Turnout | | 37,635 | 56.7 | +4.7 |
| Registered electors | | 66,330 | | +1,197 |
| Labour hold | | Swing | ―7.1 | |

2005 notional result
| Party | Vote | % |
|---|---|---|
| Labour | 19,854 | 58.6 |
| Conservative | 6,169 | 18.2 |
| Liberal Democrats | 5,619 | 16.6 |
| Others | 2,229 | 6.6 |
| Turnout | 33,871 | 52.0 |
| Electorate | 65,133 | |

=== Elections in the 2000s ===
General election 2005: Denton and Reddish
| Party | Candidate | Votes | % | ±% |
|---|---|---|---|---|
| Labour | Andrew Gwynne | 20,340 | 57.4 | ―7.8 |
| Conservative | Alexander Story | 6,842 | 19.3 | ―0.3 |
| Liberal Democrats | Allison Seabourne | 5,814 | 16.4 | +4.0 |
| BNP | John Edgar | 1,326 | 3.7 | New |
| UKIP | Gerald Price | 1,120 | 3.2 | +0.3 |
| Majority | | 13,498 | 38.1 | ―7.6 |
| Turnout | | 35,442 | 52.5 | +4.0 |
| Registered electors | | 67,509 | | –1,727 |
| Labour hold | | Swing | ―3.8 | |

General election 2001: Denton and Reddish
| Party | Candidate | Votes | % | ±% |
|---|---|---|---|---|
| Labour | Andrew Bennett | 21,913 | 65.2 | ―0.2 |
| Conservative | Paul Newman | 6,583 | 19.6 | ―1.7 |
| Liberal Democrats | Roger Fletcher | 4,152 | 12.4 | ―0.9 |
| UKIP | Alan Cadwallader | 945 | 2.8 | New |
| Majority | | 15,330 | 45.6 | +1.6 |
| Turnout | | 33,593 | 48.5 | ―18.4 |
| Registered electors | | 69,236 | | +370 |
| Labour hold | | Swing | +0.8 | |

=== Elections in the 1990s ===
General election 1997: Denton and Reddish
| Party | Candidate | Votes | % | ±% |
|---|---|---|---|---|
| Labour | Andrew Bennett | 30,137 | 65.4 | +12.4 |
| Conservative | Barbara Nutt | 9,826 | 21.3 | –12.5 |
| Liberal Democrats | Iain Donaldson | 6,121 | 13.3 | +3.3 |
| Majority | | 20,311 | 44.1 | +25.0 |
| Turnout | | 46,084 | 66.9 | –8.2 |
| Registered electors | | 68,866 | | –1,892 |
| Labour hold | | Swing | +12.5 | |

1992 notional result
| Party | Vote | % |
|---|---|---|
| Labour | 28,164 | 53.0 |
| Conservative | 18,010 | 33.9 |
| Liberal Democrats | 5,298 | 10.0 |
| Others | 1,699 | 3.2 |
| Turnout | 53,171 | 75.1 |
| Electorate | 70,758 | |

General election 1992: Denton and Reddish
| Party | Candidate | Votes | % | ±% |
|---|---|---|---|---|
| Labour | Andrew Bennett | 29,021 | 55.2 | +5.6 |
| Conservative | Jeffrey Horswell | 16,937 | 32.2 | −1.6 |
| Liberal Democrats | Horace Ridley | 4,953 | 9.4 | −7.1 |
| Liberal | Martin Powell | 1,296 | 2.5 | New |
| Natural Law | John Fuller | 354 | 0.7 | New |
| Majority | | 12,084 | 23.0 | +7.3 |
| Turnout | | 52,561 | 76.8 | +1.3 |
| Registered electors | | 68,463 | | –1,070 |
| Labour hold | | Swing | +3.6 | |

=== Elections in the 1980s ===
General election 1987: Denton and Reddish
| Party | Candidate | Votes | % | ±% |
|---|---|---|---|---|
| Labour | Andrew Bennett | 26,023 | 49.6 | +5.3 |
| Conservative | Peter Slater | 17,773 | 33.9 | −0.1 |
| SDP | Thomas Huffer | 8,697 | 16.6 | −5.2 |
| Majority | | 8,250 | 15.7 | +5.5 |
| Turnout | | 52,493 | 75.5 | +2.7 |
| Registered electors | | 69,533 | | +872 |
| Labour hold | | Swing | +2.7 | |

General election 1983: Denton and Reddish
| Party | Candidate | Votes | % | ±% |
|---|---|---|---|---|
| Labour | Andrew Bennett | 22,123 | 44.2 | –12.1 |
| Conservative | John Snadden | 16,998 | 34.0 | –2.7 |
| SDP | John Begg | 10,869 | 21.7 | +15.8 |
| Majority | | 5,125 | 10.3 | –9.4 |
| Turnout | | 49,990 | 72.8 | |
| Registered electors | | 68,661 | | |
| Labour hold | | Swing | –4.7 | |

1979 notional result
| Party | Vote | % |
|---|---|---|
| Labour | 29,159 | 56.4 |
| Conservative | 18,981 | 36.7 |
| Liberal | 3,083 | 6.0 |
| Others | 484 | 0.9 |
| Turnout | 51,707 | |
| Electorate | | |

== See also ==
- List of parliamentary constituencies in Greater Manchester

== Sources ==
- Election results 1992–2005
- Election results 1983–1992
