= Stockport North =

Parliamentary constituency in the United Kingdom, 1950–1983

- Former borough constituency for the House of Commons
- Boundary of Stockport North in Cheshire, boundaries 1974–83
- County: Cheshire

1950–1983
- Seats: one
- Created from: Stockport
- Replaced by: Denton and Reddish and Stockport

Stockport North was a borough constituency which returned one Member of Parliament (MP) to the House of Commons of the Parliament of the United Kingdom from 1950 until 1983.

== History ==
Under the Representation of the People Act 1948, which came into effect for the 1950 general election, the two-member parliamentary borough of Stockport was abolished and replaced by the single-member borough constituencies of Stockport North and Stockport South.

Further to the Third Periodic Review of Westminster constituencies, which followed the local government reorganisation implemented on 1 April 1974, the constituency was abolished for the 1983 general election, with 60% of the electorate going to the new single-member Stockport constituency, and 40% going to form part of the new Denton and Reddish constituency.

== Boundaries ==
1950–1974: The County Borough of Stockport wards of Edgeley, Heaton Lane, Heaton Norris North, Heaton Norris South, Hollywood, Lancashire Hill, Old Road, Reddish North, and Reddish South.

1974–1983: The County Borough of Stockport wards of Cheadle Heath, Edgeley, Heaton Chapel, Heaton Mersey, Heaton Moor, Heaton Norris, Lancashire Hill, Longford, and Reddish Green.

Boundaries adjusted to take account of revision of local authority wards

From 1 April 1974 until the constituency was abolished for the 1983 general election, the constituency comprised parts of the metropolitan borough of Stockport in Greater Manchester, but its boundaries were unchanged.

On abolition, the majority of the constituency was re-combined with the majority of Stockport South to form the re-established constituency of Stockport. Northern-most parts, comprising the town of Reddish, were included in the new constituency of Denton and Reddish.

== Members of Parliament ==
Always a fairly marginal seat, the constituency changed hands at the 1964, 1970 and February 1974 general elections.

| Election | Member | Party | Notes |
|---|---|---|---|
| 1950 | Sir Norman Hulbert | Conservative | Co Member for Stockport (1935–1950) |
| 1964 | Arnold Gregory | Labour | |
| 1970 | Idris Owen | Conservative | |
| Feb 1974 | Andrew Bennett | Labour | Contested Denton and Reddish following redistribution |
| 1983 | constituency abolished: see Stockport & Denton and Reddish | | |

== Election results ==
=== Elections in the 1950s ===
General election 1950: Stockport North
| Party | Candidate | Votes | % |
|---|---|---|---|
| Conservative | Norman Hulbert | 22,762 | 47.9 |
| Labour | AM Watson | 19,134 | 40.3 |
| Liberal | William Hugh Evans | 5,638 | 11.9 |
| Majority | | 3,628 | 7.6 |
| Turnout | | 47,534 | 88.5 |
| Registered electors | | 53,686 | |
| Conservative win (new seat) | | | |

General election 1951: Stockport North
| Party | Candidate | Votes | % | ±% |
|---|---|---|---|---|
| Conservative | Norman Hulbert | 25,691 | 55.1 | +7.3 |
| Labour | John Owen | 20,893 | 44.9 | +4.6 |
| Majority | | 4,798 | 10.3 | +2.7 |
| Turnout | | 46,584 | 85.4 | –3.2 |
| Registered electors | | 54,576 | | +890 |
| Conservative hold | | Swing | +1.3 | |

General election 1955: Stockport North
| Party | Candidate | Votes | % | ±% |
|---|---|---|---|---|
| Conservative | Norman Hulbert | 23,547 | 55.4 | +0.2 |
| Labour | Muriel Nichol | 18,980 | 44.6 | –0.2 |
| Majority | | 4,567 | 10.8 | +0.4 |
| Turnout | | 42,527 | 79.8 | –5.5 |
| Registered electors | | 53,271 | | –1,305 |
| Conservative hold | | Swing | +0.2 | |

General election 1959: Stockport North
| Party | Candidate | Votes | % | ±% |
|---|---|---|---|---|
| Conservative | Norman Hulbert | 23,487 | 53.7 | –1.7 |
| Labour | Mervyn Edward J. Swain | 20,265 | 46.3 | +1.7 |
| Majority | | 3,222 | 7.4 | –3.4 |
| Turnout | | 43,752 | 82.1 | +2.3 |
| Registered electors | | 53,287 | | +16 |
| Conservative hold | | Swing | –1.7 | |

=== Elections in the 1960s ===
General election 1964: Stockport North
| Party | Candidate | Votes | % | ±% |
|---|---|---|---|---|
| Labour | Arnold Gregory | 18,969 | 44.5 | –1.8 |
| Conservative | Norman Hulbert | 17,067 | 40.1 | –13.6 |
| Liberal | Barry Downs | 6,560 | 15.4 | New |
| Majority | | 1,902 | 4.5 | N/A |
| Turnout | | 42,596 | 81.5 | –0.6 |
| Registered electors | | 52,283 | | –1,004 |
| Labour gain from Conservative | | Swing | +5.9 | |

General election 1966: Stockport North
| Party | Candidate | Votes | % | ±% |
|---|---|---|---|---|
| Labour | Arnold Gregory | 21,598 | 54.2 | +9.7 |
| Conservative | Idris Owen | 18,262 | 45.8 | +5.7 |
| Majority | | 3,336 | 8.4 | +3.9 |
| Turnout | | 39,860 | 79.1 | –2.3 |
| Registered electors | | 50,370 | | –1,913 |
| Labour hold | | Swing | +2.0 | |

=== Elections in the 1970s ===
General election 1970: Stockport North
| Party | Candidate | Votes | % | ±% |
|---|---|---|---|---|
| Conservative | Idris Owen | 18,132 | 46.0 | +0.2 |
| Labour | Arnold Gregory | 17,261 | 43.8 | –10.4 |
| Liberal | Samuel Collier | 4,022 | 10.2 | New |
| Majority | | 871 | 2.2 | N/A |
| Turnout | | 39,415 | 74.9 | –4.3 |
| Registered electors | | 52,647 | | +2,277 |
| Conservative gain from Labour | | Swing | +5.3 | |

1970 notional result
| Party | Vote | % |
|---|---|---|
| Conservative | 18,400 | 45.9 |
| Labour | 17,600 | 43.9 |
| Liberal | 4,100 | 10.2 |
| Turnout | 40,100 | 74.8 |
| Electorate | 53,640 | |

General election February 1974: Stockport North
| Party | Candidate | Votes | % | ±% |
|---|---|---|---|---|
| Labour | Andrew Bennett | 16,948 | 39.4 | –4.5 |
| Conservative | Idris Owen | 16,745 | 39.0 | –6.9 |
| Liberal | P.J. Arnold | 9,283 | 21.6 | +11.4 |
| Majority | | 203 | 0.5 | N/A |
| Turnout | | 42,976 | 82.0 | +7.3 |
| Registered electors | | 52,387 | | –1,253 |
| Labour gain from Conservative | | Swing | +1.2 | |

General election October 1974: Stockport North
| Party | Candidate | Votes | % | ±% |
|---|---|---|---|---|
| Labour | Andrew Bennett | 17,979 | 43.6 | +4.2 |
| Conservative | Idris Owen | 16,155 | 39.2 | +0.2 |
| Liberal | P.J. Arnold | 7,085 | 17.2 | –4.4 |
| Majority | | 1,824 | 4.4 | +4.0 |
| Turnout | | 41,219 | 78.0 | –4.0 |
| Registered electors | | 52,828 | | |
| Labour hold | | Swing | +2.0 | |

General election 1979: Stockport North
| Party | Candidate | Votes | % | ±% |
|---|---|---|---|---|
| Labour | Andrew Bennett | 18,789 | 44.1 | +0.5 |
| Conservative | John William Last | 18,456 | 43.3 | +4.1 |
| Liberal | J. Hartley | 5,096 | 12.0 | –5.2 |
| National Front | K Walker | 244 | 0.6 | New |
| Majority | | 333 | 0.8 | −3.6 |
| Turnout | | 42,585 | 79.5 | +1.5 |
| Registered electors | | 53,533 | | |
| Labour hold | | Swing | –1.8 | |

== See also ==
- History of parliamentary constituencies and boundaries in Cheshire
