= Edmund Wood (British politician) =

British politician (1898–1947)

Edmund Walter Hanbury Wood (16 November 1898 – 12 December 1947) was a British Conservative Party politician.

Born in London, Wood was the younger son of Sir John Wood, 1st Baronet (1857–1951), by his second wife Gertrude (died 1927), who was the third daughter of the second Lord Bateman.

He was educated at Stubbington House School and Eton College, and the Royal Military College Sandhurst. He graduated from Sandhurst in 1917 at the height of the First World War, receiving a commission in the 2nd Life Guards. He left the army in 1920 with the rank of major.

He was elected at the 1924 general election as the member of parliament (MP) for Stalybridge and Hyde, but was defeated at the 1929 general election and did not stand for parliament again.

Wood was the chairman of the London Municipal Society, and in 1932 he was elected to fill a vacancy in the representation of Westminster St Georges on the London County Council. A member of the minority party on the council, the Conservative-backed Municipal Reform Party, he was chief whip of the party from 1937 to 1940. He stood down from the council at the 1946 election.

He died at his home, Hengrave Lodge near Bury St Edmunds, aged 49, after a long illness.

Parliament of the United Kingdom
| Preceded by J. Lincoln Tattersall | Member of Parliament for Stalybridge and Hyde; 1924 – 1929 | Succeeded by Hugh Hartley Lawrie |
