= Norman Hulbert =

British company director, Royal Air Force officer and politician

Wing Commander Sir Norman Hulbert DL

London County Councillor for Islington East with Guy Neumann
- In office 8 March 1934 – 4 March 1937
- Preceded by: Sir Cyril Cobb and Charles Robertson
- Succeeded by: Day Kimball and Sir Ronald Storrs

Member of Parliament for Stockport with Sir Arnold Gridley
- In office 14 November, 1935 – 23 February, 1950
- Preceded by: Samuel Schofield Hammersley and Alan Vincent Gandar Dower

Member of Parliament for Stockport North
- In office 23 February, 1950 – 15 October, 1964
- Succeeded by: Arnold Gregory

Personal details
- Born: 5 June 1903
- Died: 1 June 1972 (aged 68)
- Party: Conservative
- Spouse(s): 1st (1936), Helen Margaret Tyler (m. diss. 1938); 2nd (1938), Dr Eileen Pearl Gretton-Watson (m. diss. 1960); 3rd (1962), Mrs Betty Bullock (m. diss. 1966); 4th (1966) Eliette von Tschirschky and Boegendorff CVO; 5th (1971) Mrs Phyllis Beatrice Harrison
- Occupation: Company director

Wing Commander Sir Norman John Hulbert, DL (5 June 1903 – 1 June 1972) was a British company director, Royal Air Force officer and politician who served as a member of parliament for the Conservative Party for nearly thirty years. Early in his career, he was an advocate of closer relations with Nazi Germany but he served in action during the Second World War. At the end of his career, he attracted unwelcome publicity by attacking the pioneering BBC satirical television programme That Was The Week That Was.

== Education ==
Hulbert was educated at Cranbrook School and Tonbridge School in Kent, both Independent schools. In 1918, Hulbert left school when the First World War was still going and enlisted in Royal Navy Transport.

== Business career ==
He became a director of public companies including in the field of aviation. In January 1927, he was appointed honorary Secretary of the Institute of Aeronautical Engineers. He was also a member of the Royal Aero Club and represented the Club at the memorial service for Sir Henry Segrave. Hulbert was also involved in the film world, and was chairman and managing director of Capital News Theatres until it was taken over in January 1938.

== Municipal affairs ==
At the 1934 election to the London County Council, Hulbert was one of the two Municipal Reform candidates in Islington East. The Municipal Reform party was effectively the vehicle through which the Conservative Party fought local elections in London. Hulbert succeeded in winning his seat; the Islington East division was the only one where the Municipal Reformers made a gain at the election.

== Parliamentary nomination ==
Hulbert's position on the LCC helped him in March 1935, when he was adopted as one of the Conservative Party candidates for the two-member Stockport constituency. He and his fellow candidate Sir Arnold Gridley safely held the seat at the 1935 general election. Shortly after his election, on 11 December 1935 Hulbert married Helen Margaret Tyler at St Clement Danes Church.

In 1936, Hulbert promoted the work of the London Police Court Mission, which attempted to place offenders in useful work as an alternative to prison. Hulbert was a member of the Anglo-German Fellowship and served on that organisation's Council in 1936–7; he was a guest in Germany at the Nuremberg Rally on 12 September 1938. The next month, Hulbert divorced his first wife and within a week married Dr (Eileen) Pearl Gretton-Watson, who was like him active in politics; she also later served on the London County Council.

Pearl and Norman had two daughters Virginia (1941) and Alexandra(1946)

== Second World War ==
Hulbert remained involved in the Anglo-German Fellowship after the Munich Agreement, when it transformed into a private company; he was one of the directors. However, at the outbreak of the Second World War, Hulbert enlisted in the Royal Air Force, serving in combat and achieving the rank of Wing Commander. In 1943, he left to be British Liaison officer with the Free Polish forces. He was also Parliamentary Private Secretary to Oliver Lyttelton, who served as Minister of Production and later as President of the Board of Trade, from 1944. At the end of the war he was awarded the Order of Polonia Restituta.

== Post-war politics ==
Hulbert remained involved in business and was Chairman of British Steel Constructions (Birmingham) Ltd in 1945; he left the board in 1949. At the 1945 general election Hulbert retained his seat by only 1,365 votes. He served on the Estimates Committee during the 1945–50 Parliament. He was loyal to the Conservative Party in Parliament, never voting against the whip; and in 1947 attacked proposals for a tax on advertising as "a hindrance rather than an aid to the recovery of this country's prosperity".

== Stockport North ==
In boundary changes which took effect at the 1950 general election, Stockport was divided into two single-member constituencies. Hulbert was chosen for Stockport North, which was slightly better territory for the Conservatives than the South division. He retained the seat and in the new Parliament was designated as a Temporary Chairman of the House and as a Chairman of Standing Committees. From 1952, Hulbert was a Deputy Lieutenant of Middlesex, and he was also appointed as Honorary Colonel of no. 461 HAA Regiment of the Royal Artillery (Territorial Army) in the same year. He received a Knighthood in 1955.

== Business difficulty ==
One of Hulbert's business posts was taken from him in September 1956. He had for a long time been a director of the R.F.D. Company, aeronautical engineers and fabric screen printers, and had been chairman since the 1940s. However, in the company's annual meeting in June 1956, he unsuccessfully proposed to appoint three additional directors. When the proposal was ruled out of order, Hulbert was asked to resign and agreed to do so in September. However, in the summer of 1956, Hulbert sent a letter to the company's shareholders asking for support to requisition an Extraordinary General Meeting to elect the new directors, which the board took as an indication that no resignation would be forthcoming and they therefore dismissed him as a director.

After the 1959 general election, Hulbert was elected Chairman of the House of Commons Motor Club. He led a Parliamentary delegation to Norway in March 1960. He was Chairman of the Standing Committee to which Margaret Thatcher's Private Members Bill, the Public Bodies (Admission of the Press) Bill, was committed. In June 1960, Lady Hulbert was granted a divorce from him on account of his adultery, and he married Mrs Betty Bullock in March 1962.

== That Was The Week That Was ==
Hulbert was incensed when, on 19 January 1963, the BBC television programme That Was The Week That Was broadcast an item identifying the 13 members of parliament who had not spoken in the Chamber since the general election. He raised the issue as a question of Parliamentary privilege, saying that it was a claim that the Members concerned had not been attentive to their Parliamentary duties, and was inaccurate. Many other MPs considered the complaint itself risible and laughed while he was making it. The Speaker gave the complaint the traditional overnight consideration but ruled that it did not prima facie amount to an affront to the House.

== Defeat ==
Later in 1963, Hulbert became an advocate of televising the House of Commons, urging a trial period of closed-circuit transmission so that the practicability could be investigated. Despite attracting some attention by campaigning in a red Mini decorated with blue ribbons, Hulbert lost his seat at the 1964 general election; his criticism of That Was The Week That Was probably damaged him. He swiftly decided not to seek to return to the House of Commons.

== Later life ==
He continued in business where he had been Chairman of Associated Motor Cycles for several years. In March 1966, he filed for divorce from his third wife. In the meantime, Associated Motor Cycles suffered economic difficulties and called in the receiver in August 1966. Hulbert married his fourth wife, Eliette von Tschirschky and Boegendorff CVO, on 27 September 1966. He married his 5th, and final, wife, Mrs Phyllis Beatrice Harrison, at Battle Registry Office late 1971.

Parliament of the United Kingdom
Preceded by Samuel Hammersley; Alan Dower	Member of Parliament for Stockport; 1935–1950; With: Sir Arnold Gridley	Constituency divided
New constituency	Member of Parliament for Stockport North; 1950–1964	Succeeded by Arnold Gregory
