= Sir John Rhodes, 2nd Baronet =

Sir John Phillips Rhodes, 2nd Baronet, DSO (19 July 1884 – 14 November 1955) was the son of Sir George Rhodes, a justice of the peace for Cheshire. He was chairman of Thomas Rhodes, cotton spinners and manufacturers and represented Stalybridge and Hyde in the House of Commons as a conservative from 1922 to 1923. He succeeded to his father's baronetcy in 1924. His wife, Lady Doris Rhodes, was a successful bridge player. His son was Sir Christopher George Rhodes, 3rd Baronet, a film and television actor.

Parliament of the United Kingdom
| Preceded by Sir John Wood, 1st Baronet | Member of Parliament for Stalybridge and Hyde; 1922 – 1923 | Succeeded by J. Lincoln Tattersall |
Baronetage of the United Kingdom
| Preceded by George Rhodes | Baronet (of Hollingworth); 1924–1955 | Succeeded by Christopher George Rhodes |
