= Sir John Wood, 1st Baronet =

British politician (1857–1951)

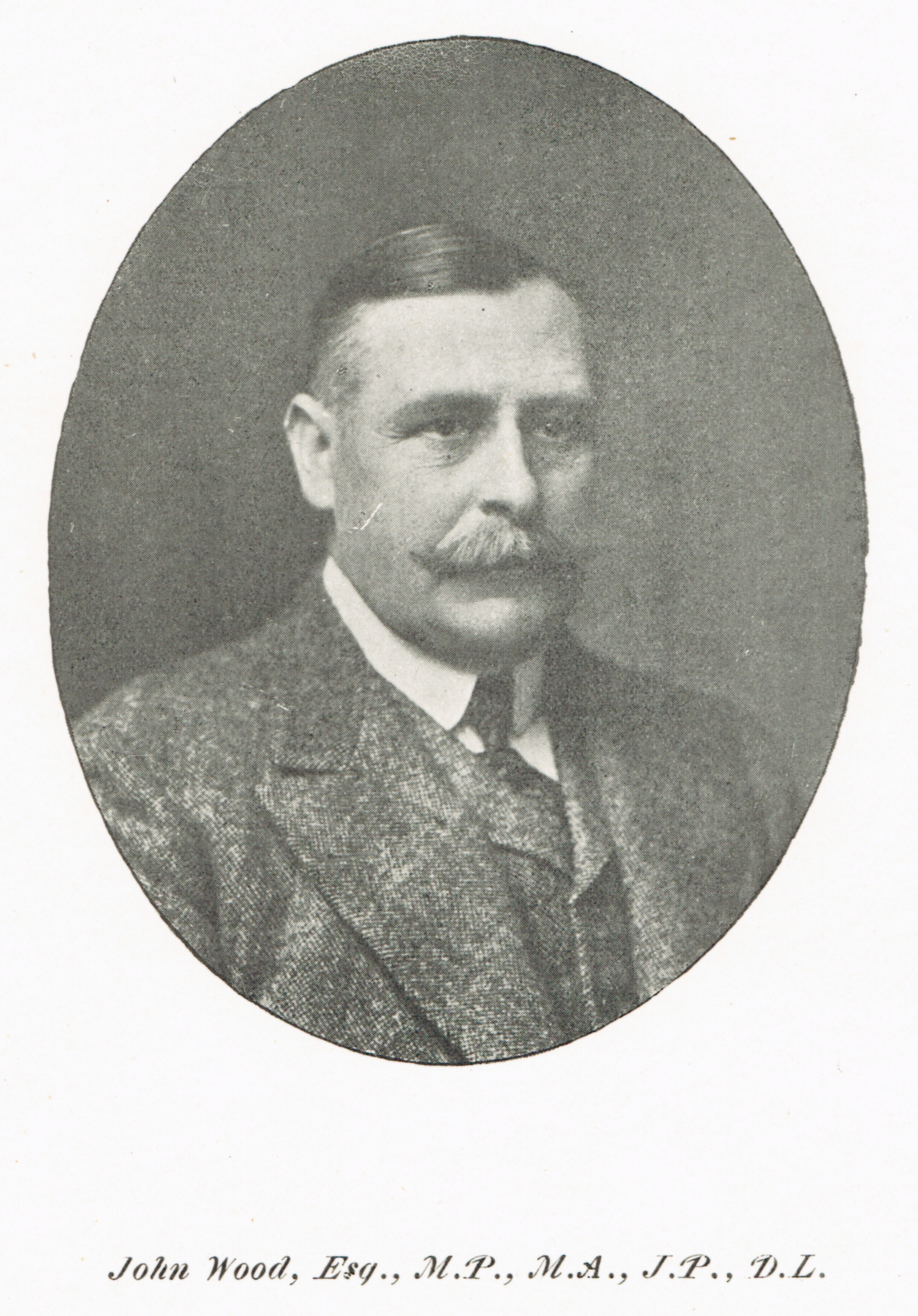
John Wood (1857-1951) photographed c.1911 or earlier

Sir John Wood, 1st Baronet DL (8 September 1857 – 28 January 1951) was a British Conservative Party politician who served as the Member of Parliament (MP) for Stalybridge from 1910 to 1918 and then for Stalybridge and Hyde from 1918–1922. He was created a baronet, of Hengrave, Suffolk, on 14 February 1918.

Educated at Rugby School and at Magdalen College, Oxford, Wood was a barrister, called to the bar at the Inner Temple in 1883. He married twice, firstly in 1883 to Estelle Benham. His second marriage was in 1892 to Gertrude Emily Bateman (died 1927), third daughter of the 3rd Baron Bateman; they had two sons and one daughter. His elder son, John Arthur Haigh, succeeded to the baronetcy, and his younger son Edmund was MP for Stalybridge and Hyde from 1924 to 1929.

== Sources ==
- https://web.archive.org/web/20070928035535/http://usenet.lineages.co.uk/article.php?id_article=2674&grp_id=1

Parliament of the United Kingdom
Preceded by John Frederick Cheetham	Member of Parliament for Stalybridge; Jan. 1910 – 1918	constituency abolished (see Stalybridge & Hyde)
New constituency see Stalybridge and Hyde	Member of Parliament for Stalybridge and Hyde; 1918 – 1922	Succeeded by John Rhodes
Baronetage of the United Kingdom
New creation	Baronet (of Hengrave); 1918–1951	Succeeded by John Arthur Haigh Wood
