= London Municipal Society =

English political organisation

The London Municipal Society was formed in 1894 to support the pro-Unionist Moderate candidates in London local elections. It was a Liberal Unionist society, and was wound up in 1963, following the legislation that would create the Greater London Council.

The stated policy of the society at the 1897 vestry elections was "conferring on the local authorities of the metropolis municipal dignity and privileges". In July the society urged the government to introduce legislation to create municipalities in London.

In 1895 the society was based at 16 Great Goodge Street, in 1910 it was at 11 Tothill Street, and by 1915 it was at 2 Bridge Street.

In 1921 the then secretary of the society, W. G. Fowler, made comments on the Poplar Rates Rebellion, and wrote a letter to The Times on the subject.

== Bibliography ==
- Ken Young, Local Politics and the Rise of Party: The London Municipal Society and the Conservative Intervention in Local Elections, 1894-1963. Leicester University Press, 1975.
- Ken Young, Metropolitan London: politics and urban change, 1837-1981. Edward Arnold, 1982. ISBN 0-7131-6331-3).

There are several files at The National Archives, one (from 1920 to 1921) relating to a deputation 'about the appalling increase in rates.'
