= Andrew Bennett (politician) =

British politician (1939–2024)

Member of Parliament
- In office 28 February 1974 – 11 April 2005
- Preceded by: Idris Owen
- Succeeded by: Andrew Gwynne
- Constituency: Stockport North (1974–1983; Denton and Reddish (1983–2005)

Shadow Spokesperson for Education
- In office 1 January 1983 – 1 January 1988

Personal details
- Born: 9 March 1939 Barton upon Irwell, England, United Kingdom
- Died: 15 December 2024 (aged 85)
- Party: Labour
- Spouse: Gillian Lawley (m. 1961; died 2023)
- Children: 2 sons and 1 daughter
- Education: University of Birmingham (BA)

Andrew Francis Bennett (9 March 1939 – 15 December 2024) was a British Labour Party politician. He was the Member of Parliament (MP) for Stockport North from 1974 to 1983, and then for Denton and Reddish from 1983 to 2005.

== Early life ==
Bennett was born in Barton-upon-Irwell. He attended the William Hulme's Grammar School in Whalley Range. He studied at the University of Birmingham gaining a BSocSc (Bachelor of Social Science). A geography teacher from 1960 to 1974, Bennett was elected to Oldham Borough Council in 1964, and served on it until 1974.

== Parliamentary career ==
Bennett contested the Knutsford parliamentary seat in 1970 and was elected to Parliament in February 1974 for the marginal constituency of Stockport North, defeating the Conservative incumbent Idris Owen by just 203 votes. Following boundary changes, he was elected MP for Denton and Reddish in 1983. From 1983 to 1988 he served on the Labour front bench as a shadow Education and Science minister. He was chairman of the House of Commons Committee on Statutory Instruments.

Bennett rebelled against the Labour government on various issues, including the privatisation of National Air Traffic Services.

Bennett retired at the 2005 general election, and the seat was held for Labour by Andrew Gwynne.

== Personal life and death ==
In 1961, Bennett married Gillian Lawley in Manchester. They had a daughter and two sons. Lawley died on 13 December 2023, at the age of 84. Bennett died after a short illness on 15 December 2024, at the age of 85.

Parliament of the United Kingdom
Preceded by Idris Owen	Member of Parliament for Stockport North; 1974–1983	Constituency abolished
New constituency	Member of Parliament for Denton and Reddish; 1983–2005	Succeeded by Andrew Gwynne
