= Arnold Gregory =

British textile company worker, lecturer and politician

Member of Parliament for Stockport North
- In office 1964–1970

Personal details
- Born: 14 November 1924 Salford, United Kingdom
- Died: 30 July 1976 (aged 51)
- Party: Labour

Arnold Gregory (14 November 1924 – 30 July 1976) was a British textile company worker, lecturer and politician who was a Labour Party Member of Parliament for six years.

Gregory came from a lower-middle-class background and was born in Salford. He went to state schools and the Manchester College of Technology. He became an apprentice engineer and joined the Amalgamated Engineering Union in 1941, joining in addition the Labour Party in 1944. He took extramural courses at the University of Manchester. Working as a Contracts Manager for a textiles company, Gregory became a member of the Clerical and Administrative Workers' Union from 1950.

From 1956, Gregory worked as a Lecturer and Tutor for the National Council of Labour Colleges. He was chosen as Labour candidate for Stafford and Stone in the 1959 general election. At the 1964 general election, he fought the marginal seat of Stockport North and won it from the Conservatives.

Gregory was a low-profile MP who allied with the left wing, opposing British diplomatic support for the United States over the Vietnam War and a negotiated settlement over Rhodesia. He was defeated in the 1970 general election.

Parliament of the United Kingdom
Preceded by Norman Hulbert	Member of Parliament for Stockport North; 1964–1970	Succeeded by Idris Owen
