= Horace Trevor-Cox =

Horace Brimson Trevor-Cox (14 June 1908 – 30 October 2005) was a British farmer, landowner and politician who served from 1937 to 1945 as a Conservative Member of Parliament (MP), but left the Conservatives in the 1960s and subsequently joined the Labour Party.

Born in Birkenhead and brought up near Chester, his father (also named Horace Cox) was a successful businessman. Cox was educated at Eton College, where he was a good friend of his contemporary Quintin Hogg, later Lord Hailsham. He then studied in Germany at Leibniz University Hannover, and worked in factories in Berlin before leaving Germany in 1929 to study business studies in the United States at the University of Cincinnati.

== Political career ==
Trevor-Cox was the Conservative candidate for the North East Derbyshire constituency in the 1935 general election, but lost to Labour's Frank Lee. In April 1937 he contested the Cheshire constituency of Stalybridge and Hyde in a by-election and won, with a majority of only 334 votes over the Labour candidate, Rev Gordon Lang.

He was appointed in 1938 as a Parliamentary Private Secretary to the Trade minister Ronald Cross, becoming the most junior member of Neville Chamberlain's government. In his Commons speeches before the war, he drew on his experience of Germany to warning about the likelihood of war. When World War II broke out in September 1939, Cox volunteered for the Welsh Guards, and for the rest of the war divided his time between the army and the House of Commons.

In the Labour landslide at the 1945 general election, Cox lost his seat by a wide margin to Rev. Gordon Lang. He stood unsuccessfully as the Conservative candidate for Birkenhead in the 1950 general election but otherwise concentrated on his estates in Wiltshire.

Dissatisfied with the Conservatives in the 1960s, he left the party and stood as an Independent Conservative candidate at the 1965 Salisbury by-election, but won only 533 votes. He subsequently joined the Labour Party and contested council elections in the 1970s, but never regained public office.

Trevor-Cox died 60 years and 117 days after leaving the House of Commons, aged 97. He thus enjoyed one of the longest post-service lifespans of any former MP.

Parliament of the United Kingdom
Preceded by Philip Dunne	Member of Parliament for Stalybridge and Hyde; 1937 – 1945	Succeeded by Gordon Lang
