= Hugh Hartley Lawrie =

English politician

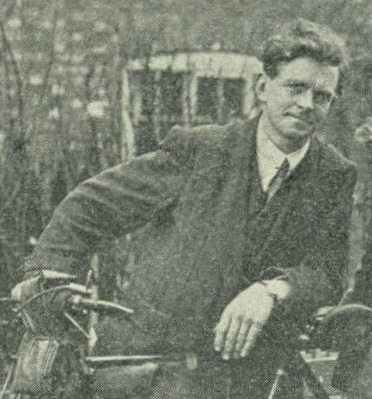
Lawrie in 1916

Hugh Hartley Lawrie (1879–1945) was a British trade unionist and politician, elected as Labour MP for Stalybridge and Hyde from 1929 to 1931.

== Life ==
He was the son of John Lawrie of Rochdale, born there. He was educated at a Board School before working at a local cotton mill from age 11. Later he found work on the staff of a newspaper in Manchester.

Lawrie became active in the Workers' Union and was appointed as a union official in 1910, when the union was campaigning for £1 per week. He is regarded as a protégé of John Beard, and was involved in trying to organise farmworkers, around the time of World War I. Nationally the union's membership rose strongly from 1911. An effort in Shropshire in 1914 involved peat-cutters at Whixall, and with another organiser Arthur Flavell at Oakengates, mostly workers in the coalfield there, without attracting agricultural workers in general. It was ended by the outbreak of war. In 1916 Lawrie was based at Tunstall, Staffordshire.

Becoming a national organiser for the Workers' Union, Lawrie remained when it became part of the Transport and General Workers' Union. He was a long-term member of the Independent Labour Party. He became active in the Labour Party, and was elected in Stalybridge and Hyde at the 1929 general election.

Lawrie was a supporter of the Prime Minister, Ramsay MacDonald, and followed Macdonald in leaving the Labour Party to join the new National Labour Organisation. However, he decided not to contest the 1931 general election.

He was vice-president of the TGWU Woolwich branch, sitting on the committee from 1941 until his death. He was cremated in Honor Oak on 11 April 1945.

== Family ==
Lawrie married in 1907 Amy Elizabeth Jones, daughter of Llewellyn Jones of Manchester.

Parliament of the United Kingdom
Preceded by Edmund Wood	Member of Parliament for Stalybridge and Hyde; 1929 – 1931	Succeeded by Sydney Hope
