= Tom Pendry, Baron Pendry =

British politician (1934–2023)

The Right Honourable The Lord Pendry PC
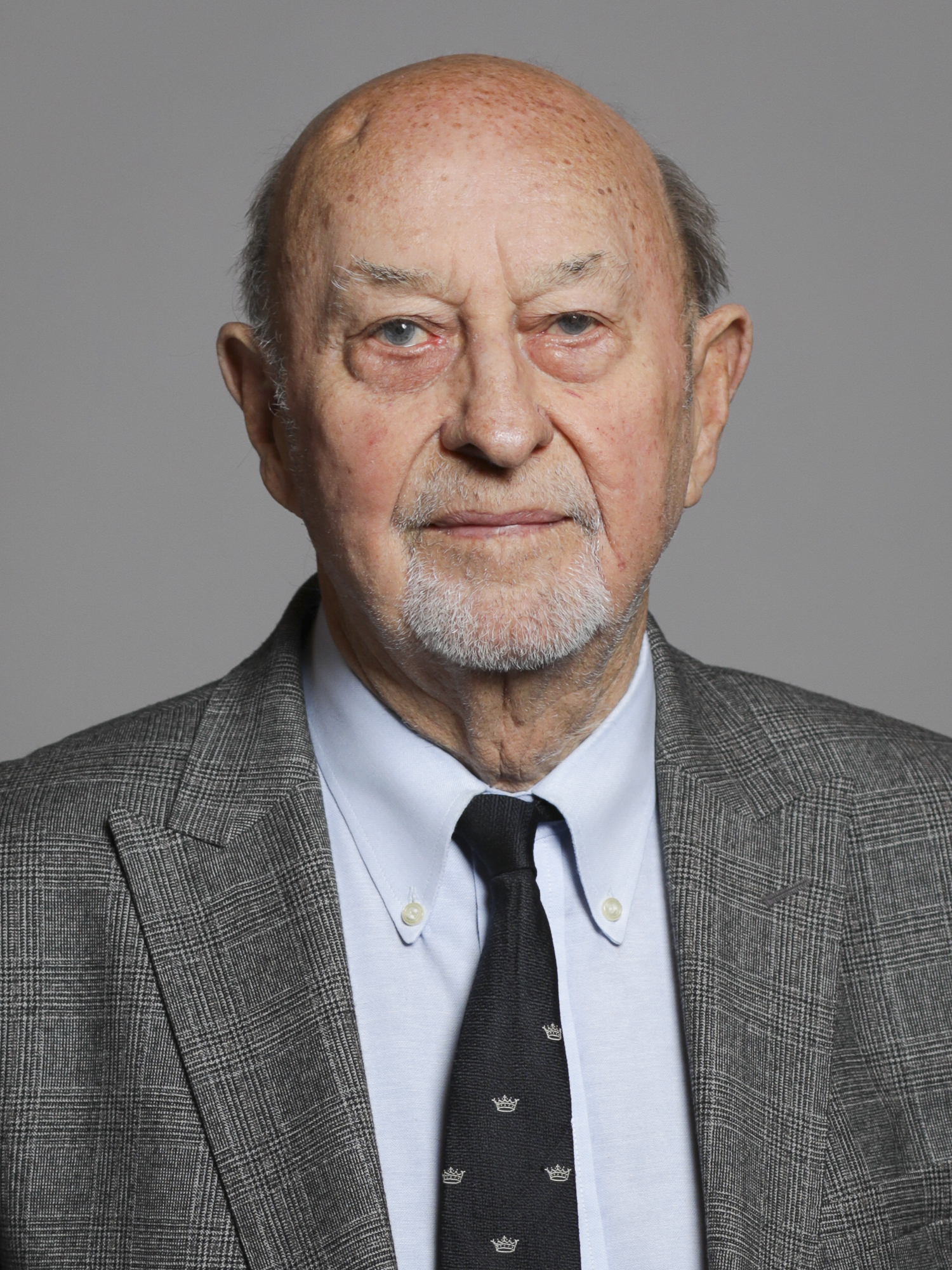
- Official portrait, 2020

Parliamentary Under-Secretary of State for Northern Ireland
- In office 11 November 1978 – 4 May 1979
- Prime Minister: James Callaghan
- Sec. of State: Roy Mason
- Preceded by: Raymond Carter
- Succeeded by: The Lord Elton

Lord Commissioner of the Treasury
- In office 8 March 1974 – 11 January 1977
- Prime Minister: Harold Wilson; James Callaghan
- Chancellor: Denis Healey
- Preceded by: Marcus Fox
- Succeeded by: Tom Cox

Member of the House of Lords
- Lord Temporal
- Life peerage 4 July 2001 – 26 February 2023

Member of Parliament for Stalybridge and Hyde
- In office 18 June 1970 – 14 May 2001
- Preceded by: Fred Blackburn
- Succeeded by: James Purnell

Personal details
- Born: 10 June 1934 Broadstairs, Kent, England
- Died: 26 February 2023 (aged 88)
- Party: Labour

Thomas Pendry, Baron Pendry, PC (10 June 1934 – 26 February 2023) was a British Labour politician and member of the House of Lords. He was previously the Labour member of parliament for Stalybridge and Hyde from 1970 to 2001. In 2000, prior to his retirement as an MP he was made a member of the Privy Council on the recommendation of Tony Blair. After the 2001 election he was elevated to the peerage on 4 July as Baron Pendry, of Stalybridge in the County of Greater Manchester. He was president of the Football Foundation Ltd and was formerly sports advisor to Tameside District Council Sports Trust.

== Early life ==
Pendry was born in Broadstairs, Kent on 10 June 1934. In an article in Cheshire Life magazine in June 2004, Pendry revealed that he was born in relatively comfortable circumstances, attending school at St Augustine's Abbey, Ramsgate and, later, Plater College. He worked as a trade union officer for NUPE, and as an engineer.

== Political career ==
Pendry was a councillor on Paddington Borough Council in London from 1962 to 1965 (when the borough was abolished), representing Harrow Road South. He was elected to Parliament in 1970 for Stalybridge and Hyde, which at the time covered areas in Cheshire and Lancashire, and subsequently became part of Greater Manchester. He served as an opposition whip between 1971 and 1974.

== Callaghan government ==
In James Callaghan's administration between 1976 and 1979 Pendry served as a junior Lord Commissioner of the Treasury (assistant government whip) and subsequently as Parliamentary Under-Secretary of State for Northern Ireland.

== Opposition ==
In 1979 he returned to the backbenches, until he was appointed to the post of Shadow Minister for Sport and Tourism by John Smith, a position he held until 1997. When the Labour government came to power in 1997, Pendry was the only member of the shadow team not to be appointed to a government post.

== Sport ==
Lord Pendry had a love of sport that he developed during National Service with the Royal Air Force. He was appointed President of the Football Foundation in February 2003 and continued to serve in this capacity up until his death in 2023. A young Pendry learnt boxing at the hands of a Benedictine monk, becoming an Oxford Blue and boxing for the RAF.

== Other interests ==
Pendry was a member of the Lords and Commons Cigar Club. From June to September 2018, he sat on the Regenerating Seaside Towns and Communities Committee. His memoir, Taking It on the Chin, was published in 2016.

== Death ==
Pendry died on 26 February 2023, at the age of 88.

== Honours and arms ==
On 21 July 1995, the Labour-controlled Tameside Metropolitan Borough Council, the local authority which had administered the area covered by the Stalybridge and Hyde constituency since 1974, made Pendry an honorary freeman of the borough. At the same time, the council granted him the lordship of the manor of Mottram in Longdendale. Tameside Council have also named part of Trinity Street in front of the old Stalybridge market hall, Lord Pendry Square. A local football club, Stalybridge Celtic, have named one of their stands The Lord Tom Pendry Stand.

Coat of arms of Tom Pendry, Baron Pendry
Crest A demi Chinese unicorn maned tufted unguled queued attired holding in the mouth by a string Gules a cinquefoil pierced per chevron reversed Gules and Vert. Escutcheon Or a chevron engrailed per chevron Vert and Gules between three rustres those in chief Gules and that in base Vert. Supporters On either side a ram Argent collared Sable supporting with the exterior forefoot a cornucopia Vert replenished Proper. Motto Pugilice Prorsum (In God Is My Trust)

Parliament of the United Kingdom
Preceded by Fred Blackburn	Member of Parliament for Stalybridge and Hyde; 1970–2001	Succeeded by James Purnell
