= High Peaks (Maine) =

Region in the state of Maine

Coordinates: 45°00′N 70°24′W

The High Peaks is a region of the US state of Maine, lying entirely within Franklin County. It is roughly bounded by State Route 4 to the southwest, State Route 16 to the northwest, State Route 16/27 to the northeast and State Route 142 to the southeast. The region contains eight of the 14 Maine 4,000-footers and includes 21,000 acres (85 km^{2}) contiguously above 2,700 feet (820 m). By comparison, Baxter State Park, which contains Maine's highest mountain, Mount Katahdin, and has a similar overall land area, has roughly 15% less contiguous land over 2700 feet. The Appalachian Trail passes through the area, covering a distance of 32.2 miles (52 km) and climbing a total of 10,000 feet (3,000 m).
