= J. Lincoln Tattersall =

English cotton merchant and Liberal politician

John Lincoln Tattersall (16 April 1865 – 6 June 1942) was an English cotton merchant and Liberal Party politician.

== Family ==
Tattersall was the son of Cornelius Tattersall a Manchester cotton merchant. In 1886, Cornelius bought the cotton mill at Woodeaves, near Ashbourne, Derbyshire, which employed around 100 workers. Cornelius installed his son John at the mill to give him manufacturing experience. In 1893 Tattersall married Lizzie Harland and they established a home in the village of Thorpe, Derbyshire. They later left Derbyshire and set up home in Prestbury, Cheshire. He named his new home Woodeaves.

== Philanthropy ==
Tattersall continued to take an interest in the area around Fenny Bentley after leaving the area. In 1939, although he was by religion a nonconformist, (his funeral service took place at the Congregational Church in Hale), Tattersall funded improvements to the village church including the re-siting of the pulpit and paving the sanctuary in Hopton Wood Stone. He also provided the wooden lectern, a replica of the medieval lectern at York Minster. Tattersall paid for outings and parties for the village children, funding these entertainments even after he had left the area. He was buried in the Church at Fenny Bentley. He was a strong supporter of the temperance movement and was sometime President of the Manchester and the Lancashire & Cheshire Band of Hope Union.

== Career ==
Like his father, Tattersall was a cotton trader. He was a member of the Executive Committee of the Master Cotton Spinners Federation and chairman, later President of the Cotton Yarn Association. In 1929 he became a director of the Lancashire Cotton Corporation, a huge new cotton combine set up with government and Bank of England support to amalgamate up to 150 mills in order to increase efficiency and create economies of scale in the face of the serious difficulties facing the industry in the 1920s.

== Politics ==
Tattersall first stood for Parliament at the 1922 general election as Liberal candidate at Stalybridge and Hyde in industrial Cheshire. In a three-cornered contest he was runner-up to the Conservative candidate John Phillips Rhodes, with Labour’s P H Ward, bottom of the poll.

General election 1922 Electorate 43,208
Party	Candidate	Votes	%	±%
Unionist	John Rhodes	17,216	49.1	
Liberal	J. Lincoln Tattersall	10,265	29.3	
Labour	Percy Horace Ward	7,578	21.6	
Majority		6,951	19.8	
Turnout			81.1	+21.1
Unionist hold		Swing		

At the 1923 general election, Tattersall had the advantage of a straight fight against Rhodes in Stalybridge, with Labour voters expected to switch their allegiance to the Liberals. Tattersall also made use of his position as a strong advocate of the traditional Liberal policy of Free Trade in an election called over the issue by Prime Minister Stanley Baldwin and he captured the seat with a majority of 2,374 votes.

General election 1923 Electorate 44,045
Party	Candidate	Votes	%	±%
Liberal	J. Lincoln Tattersall	17,082	53.7	
Unionist	John Rhodes	14,708	46.3	
Majority		2,374	7.4	
Turnout			72.2	
Liberal gain from Unionist		Swing		

However, by 1924 the political situation was transformed. The Tory Party was resurgent after the brief interlude of the first Labour government. Labour decided to contest the general election in Stalybridge again, splitting the anti-Tory vote, and Tattersall sank to the bottom of the poll with 22% of the vote, the new Conservative candidate, Edmund Wood, regaining the seat for his party with a majority of 3,903 over Labour.

General election 1924 Electorate 44,175
Party	Candidate	Votes	%	±%
Unionist	Edmund Wood	16,412	44.2	
Labour	Walter Fowden	12,509	33.7	
Liberal	J. Lincoln Tattersall	8,201	22.1	
Majority		3,903	10.5	
Turnout			84.0	
Unionist gain from Liberal		Swing		

Tattersall did not try for re-election to the House of Commons again.

== Death ==
Tattersall died on 6 June 1942, aged 77 years.

Parliament of the United Kingdom
Preceded by John Rhodes	Member of Parliament for Stalybridge and Hyde; 1923 – 1924	Succeeded by Edmund Wood
