= Stalybridge and Hyde =

Parliamentary constituency in the United Kingdom, 1918 onwards

Coordinates: 53°28′N 2°04′W

- County constituency for the House of Commons
- Interactive map of boundaries since 1997
- Location within North West England
- County: Greater Manchester
- Electorate: 73,028 (March 2020)
- Major settlements: Hyde, Mossley, Stalybridge

Current constituency
- Created: 1918
- Member of Parliament: Jonathan Reynolds (Labour Co-op)
- Seats: One
- Created from: Stalybridge and Hyde

Stalybridge and Hyde is a constituency (Note: A county constituency (for the purposes of election expenses and type of returning officer).) in Greater Manchester that was created in 1918. The seat has been represented in the House of Commons of the Parliament of the United Kingdom by Jonathan Reynolds of the Labour and Co-operative Party since 2010. (Note: As with all constituencies, the constituency elects one Member of Parliament (MP) by the first past the post system of election at least every five years.) Reynolds currently serves as Business Secretary under the government of Andy Burnham.

== Constituency profile ==
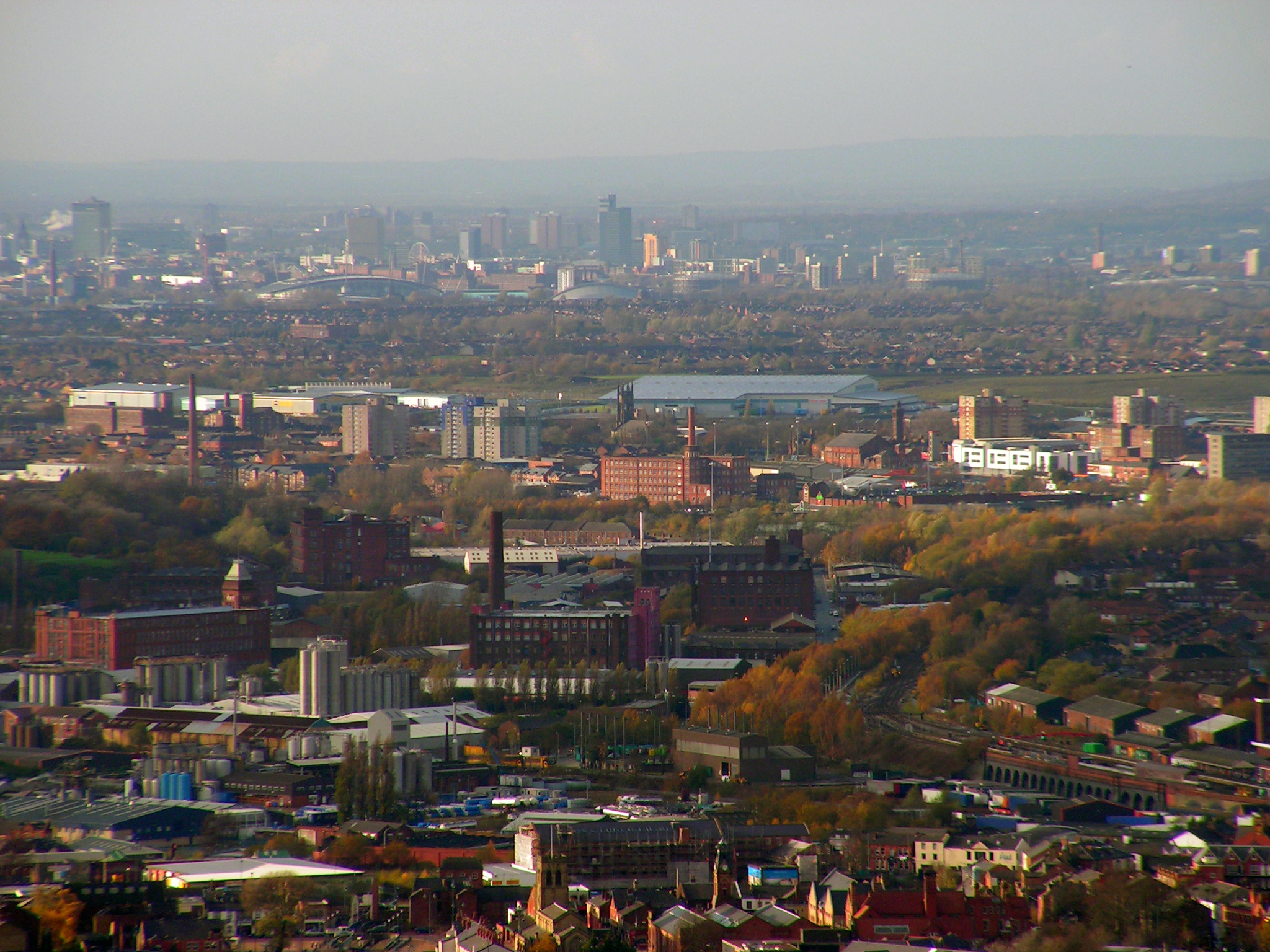
Stalybridge with central Manchester in the background

Stalybridge and Hyde is a constituency in Greater Manchester in North West England, within the borough of Tameside. Its largest town is Hyde, which has a population of around 37,000. Other settlements include the towns of Stalybridge and Mossley and the villages of Hattersley, Mottram in Longdendale, Hollingworth and Matley.

This constituency lies on the lower slopes of the Pennines. Like much of Greater Manchester, the towns here grew from rural farming settlements into centres for textile manufacturing and coal mining during the Industrial Revolution. These industries have largely disappeared and the old mills have been redeveloped. Much of the constituency is highly-deprived; many residents live in dense terraced housing built to accommodate industrial workers. Some estates (like Hattersley) consist of late-20th century council housing, much of which is socially rented. In comparison, Matley and Carrbrook are wealthier and suburban in character. House prices across the constituency are generally lower than the rest of North West England and considerably lower than the UK average.

Residents of Stalybridge and Hyde have a similar age profile to the rest of the country, although with a below-average proportion of young adults. They have low rates of income, average levels of homeownership, and the child poverty rate is high. Residents generally have low levels of education and a high proportion work in the retail, manufacturing and construction sectors. The percentage claiming unemployment benefits is in line with the overall UK rate. White people made up 90% of the population at the 2021 census. Asians, mostly of Bangladeshi origin, were 7% of residents but made up around one-third of the population in the central neighbourhoods of Hyde.

At the local borough council, there are some Labour Party councillors in the urban areas and Conservatives in the more rural villages, however Reform UK councillors were elected in every seat at the most recent election in 2026. An estimated 58% of voters in Stalybridge and Hyde supported leaving the European Union in the 2016 referendum, higher than the UK-wide figure of 52%.

== Creation ==
The seat was created under the Representation of the People Act 1918 as a county division of Cheshire. It was formed by combining the bulk of the abolished parliamentary borough of Stalybridge and the majority of the abolished county seat of Hyde.

== Boundaries ==
1918–1950: The Boroughs of Dukinfield, Hyde, and Stalybridge, the Urban Districts of Hollingworth and Mottram in Longdendale, and the Rural District of Tintwistle.

1950–1983: The Boroughs of Dukinfield, Hyde, and Stalybridge, the Urban District of Longdendale, and the Rural District of Tintwistle.

Only minor boundary changes; the urban district of Longdendale had been formed in 1936 by combining Hollingworth and Mottram in Longdendale.

On 1 April 1974, under the Local Government Act 1972, the bulk of the area covered by the constituency was incorporated into the newly created Borough of Tameside within Greater Manchester; the sparsely populated rural district of Tintwistle was transferred to the High Peak district in Derbyshire. However, the constituency boundaries remained unchanged until the Third Periodic Review of Westminster constituencies came into effect for the 1983 general election.

1983–1997: The Borough of Tameside wards of Dukinfield, Dukinfield Stalybridge, Hyde Godley, Hyde Newton, Hyde Werneth, Longdendale, Stalybridge North, and Stalybridge South.

Apart from the area now in Derbyshire, which was transferred to the constituency of High Peak, the boundaries remained broadly unchanged.

1997–present: The Borough of Tameside wards of Dukinfield Stalybridge, Hyde Godley, Hyde Newton, Hyde Werneth, Longdendale, Mossley, Stalybridge North, and Stalybridge South.

Dukinfield ward transferred to Denton and Reddish; gained Mossley ward from Ashton-under-Lyne.

The 2023 review of Westminster constituencies, which was based on the ward structure in place at 1 December 2020, left the boundaries unchanged.

== Political history ==
The seat was held by Conservatives for 34 of the 37 years from 1918 to 1945, and for the other three years by the other two main parties, the Liberal Party (1922–1923) and the Labour Party (1929–1931). It was regained by Labour at the 1945 general election and has remained a safe seat for them since then, although sometimes held with small majorities.

In 1945 the seat was won by Rev. Gordon Lang who was honorary secretary of the United Europe Movement and a leading member of the Proportional Representation Society but who retired on ill health in 1951.

James Purnell, a former 10 Downing Street special advisor, who was first elected at the 2001 general election resigned his cabinet position as Work and Pensions Secretary on 4 June 2009, citing concerns over Prime Minister Gordon Brown's leadership. On 19 February 2010, he announced that he would not contest the 2010 election. Senior Labour Party officials were concerned that Unite was strategically attempting to have Peter Wheeler, a senior Unite official, selected as the Labour candidate, as one of a series of seats, leading to the National Executive Committee putting forward Jonathan Reynolds on the selection shortlist who, as widely expected, won the election.

== Members of Parliament ==
Election	Member	Party
1918	Sir John Wood, Bt	Conservative
1922	Sir John Rhodes	Conservative
1923	J. Lincoln Tattersall	Liberal
1924	Edmund Wood	Conservative
1929	Hugh Hartley Lawrie	Labour
1931	Sydney Hope	Conservative
1935	Philip Dunne	Conservative
1937 by-election	Horace Trevor-Cox	Conservative
1945	Gordon Lang	Labour
1951	Fred Blackburn	Labour
1970	Tom Pendry	Labour
2001	James Purnell	Labour
2010	Jonathan Reynolds	Labour Co-op

== Elections ==
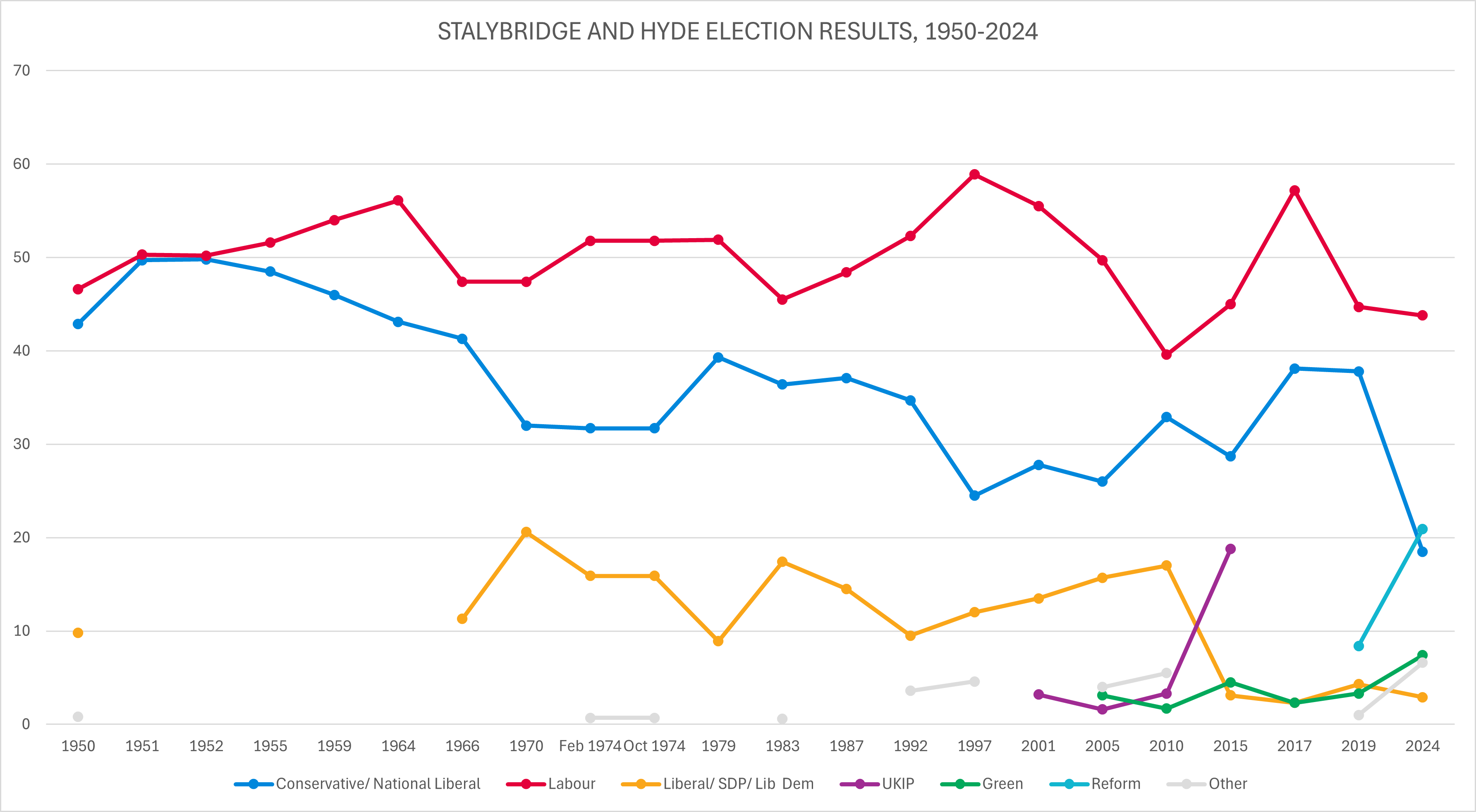
Election results 1950–2024

=== Elections in the 2020s ===
General election 2024: Stalybridge and Hyde
Party	Candidate	Votes	%	±%
Labour Co-op	Jonathan Reynolds	16,320	43.8	−1.1
Reform	Barbara Kaya	7,781	20.9	+12.4
Conservative	Phil Chadwick	6,872	18.5	−19.5
Green	Robert Hodgetts-Haley	2,745	7.4	+4.1
Workers Party	Audel Shirin	1,227	3.3	N/A
Independent	Ian Owen	1,214	3.3	N/A
Liberal Democrats	Kamala Kugan	1,080	2.9	−1.4
Majority		8,539	22.9	+16.0
Turnout		37,239	51.5	−6.8
Registered electors		72,265		
Labour hold		Swing	−6.8	

=== Elections in the 2010s ===
General election 2019: Stalybridge and Hyde
Party	Candidate	Votes	%	±%
Labour Co-op	Jonathan Reynolds	19,025	44.7	−12.5
Conservative	Tayub Amjad	16,079	37.8	−0.3
Brexit Party	Julian Newton	3,591	8.4	N/A
Liberal Democrats	Jamie Dwan	1,827	4.3	+2.0
Green	Julie Wood	1,411	3.3	+1.0
Liberal	John Edge	435	1.0	N/A
Majority		2,946	6.9	−12.2
Turnout		42,368	58.3	−1.2
Labour Co-op hold		Swing	−6.4	

General election 2017: Stalybridge and Hyde
Party	Candidate	Votes	%	±%
Labour Co-op	Jonathan Reynolds	24,277	57.2	+12.2
Conservative	Tom Dowse	16,193	38.1	+9.4
Liberal Democrats	Paul Ankers	996	2.3	−0.8
Green	Julie Wood	991	2.3	−2.2
Majority		8,084	19.1	+2.8
Turnout		42,457	59.5	+0.1
Labour Co-op hold		Swing	+1.5	

General election 2015: Stalybridge and Hyde
Party	Candidate	Votes	%	±%
Labour Co-op	Jonathan Reynolds	18,447	45.0	+5.4
Conservative	Martin Riley	11,761	28.7	−4.2
UKIP	Angela McManus	7,720	18.8	+15.5
Green	Jenny Ross	1,850	4.5	+2.8
Liberal Democrats	Peter Flynn	1,256	3.1	−13.9
Majority		6,686	16.3	+9.6
Turnout		41,034	59.4	+0.2
Labour Co-op hold		Swing	+4.8	

General election 2010: Stalybridge and Hyde
Party	Candidate	Votes	%	±%
Labour Co-op	Jonathan Reynolds	16,189	39.6	−10.1
Conservative	Rob Adlard	13,445	32.9	+6.9
Liberal Democrats	John Potter	6,965	17.0	+1.3
BNP	Anthony Jones	2,259	5.5	+1.5
UKIP	John Cooke	1,342	3.3	+1.7
Green	Ruth Bergan	679	1.7	−1.4
Majority		2,744	6.7	−17.0
Turnout		40,879	59.2	+5.7
Labour Co-op hold		Swing	−8.5	

=== Elections in the 2000s ===
General election 2005: Stalybridge and Hyde
Party	Candidate	Votes	%	±%
Labour	James Purnell	17,535	49.7	−5.8
Conservative	Lisa Boardman	9,187	26.0	−1.8
Liberal Democrats	Viv Bingham	5,532	15.7	+2.2
BNP	Nigel Byrne	1,399	4.0	N/A
Green	Mike Smee	1,088	3.1	N/A
UKIP	John Whittaker	573	1.6	−1.6
Majority		8,348	23.7	−4.0
Turnout		35,314	53.5	+5.1
Labour hold		Swing	−2.0	

General election 2001: Stalybridge and Hyde
Party	Candidate	Votes	%	±%
Labour	James Purnell	17,781	55.5	−3.4
Conservative	Andrew Reid	8,922	27.8	+3.3
Liberal Democrats	Brendon Jones	4,327	13.5	+1.5
UKIP	Frank Bennett	1,016	3.2	N/A
Majority		8,859	27.7	−6.7
Turnout		32,046	48.4	−17.3
Labour hold		Swing		

=== Elections in the 1990s ===
General election 1997: Stalybridge and Hyde
Party	Candidate	Votes	%	±%
Labour	Tom Pendry	25,363	58.9	+6.6
Conservative	Nick de Bois	10,557	24.5	−10.2
Liberal Democrats	Martin Cross	5,169	12.0	+2.5
Referendum	Robert J.D. Clapham	1,992	4.6	N/A
Majority		14,806	34.4	+16.8
Turnout		43,081	65.7	−7.8
Labour hold		Swing	+8.4	

General election 1992: Stalybridge and Hyde
Party	Candidate	Votes	%	±%
Labour	Tom Pendry	26,207	52.3	+3.9
Conservative	Simon R. Mort	17,376	34.7	−2.4
Liberal Democrats	Ian M. Kirk	4,740	9.5	−5.0
Liberal	Robert G.J. Powell	1,199	2.4	N/A
Monster Raving Loony	Darren J. Poyzer	337	0.7	N/A
Natural Law	Edward J. Blomfield	238	0.5	N/A
Majority		8,831	17.6	+6.4
Turnout		50,097	73.5	−0.7
Labour hold		Swing	+3.2	

=== Elections in the 1980s ===
General election 1987: Stalybridge and Hyde
Party	Candidate	Votes	%	±%
Labour	Tom Pendry	24,401	48.4	+2.9
Conservative	Richard Greenwood	18,738	37.1	+0.7
SDP	Peter Ashenden	7,311	14.5	−2.9
Majority		5,663	11.2	+2.1
Turnout		50,450	74.2	+3.9
Labour hold		Swing	+1.1	

General election 1983: Stalybridge and Hyde
Party	Candidate	Votes	%	±%
Labour	Tom Pendry	21,798	45.5	−6.4
Conservative	Brian Silvester	17,436	36.4	−2.9
Liberal	John Hughes	8,339	17.4	+8.5
National Front	Bryan Nylan	294	0.6	N/A
Majority		4,362	9.1	−3.5
Turnout		44,867	70.5	−6.5
Labour hold		Swing	−1.8	

=== Elections in the 1970s ===
General election 1979: Stalybridge and Hyde
Party	Candidate	Votes	%	±%
Labour	Tom Pendry	27,082	51.86	
Conservative	J Kershaw	20,502	39.26	
Liberal	J Pickup	4,642	8.89	
Majority		6,580	12.60	
Turnout		52,226	77.06	
Labour hold		Swing		

General election October 1974: Stalybridge and Hyde
Party	Candidate	Votes	%	±%
Labour	Tom Pendry	25,161	51.76	
Conservative	S Burgoyne	15,404	31.69	
Liberal	Donald Fletcher Burden	7,725	15.89	N/A
Independent	G Tetler	318	0.65	N/A
Majority		9,757	20.07	
Turnout		48,608	73.22	
Labour hold		Swing		

General election February 1974: Stalybridge and Hyde
Party	Candidate	Votes	%	±%
Labour	Tom Pendry	24,922	47.36	
Conservative	Sam M. Swerling	16,854	32.03	
Independent Liberal	Harold White	10,850	20.62	N/A
Majority		8,068	15.33	
Turnout		52,626	79.94	
Labour hold		Swing		

General election 1970: Stalybridge and Hyde
Party	Candidate	Votes	%	±%
Labour	Tom Pendry	22,226	47.38	
Conservative	John E Rogerson	19,377	41.31	
Liberal	Robert Cooke	5,303	11.31	N/A
Majority		2,849	6.07	
Turnout		46,906	73.40	
Labour hold		Swing		

=== Elections in the 1960s ===
General election 1966: Stalybridge and Hyde
Party	Candidate	Votes	%	±%
Labour	Fred Blackburn	23,974	56.91	
Conservative	John E Rogerson	18,153	43.09	
Majority		5,821	13.82	
Turnout		42,127	73.56	
Labour hold		Swing		

General election 1964: Stalybridge and Hyde
Party	Candidate	Votes	%	±%
Labour	Fred Blackburn	23,164	53.99	
Conservative	Sydney Chapman	19,739	46.01	
Majority		3,425	7.98	
Turnout		42,903	78.59	
Labour hold		Swing		

=== Elections in the 1950s ===
General election 1959: Stalybridge and Hyde
Party	Candidate	Votes	%	±%
Labour	Fred Blackburn	23,732	51.55	
Conservative	Edward Brown	22,309	48.45	
Majority		1,423	3.10	
Turnout		46,041	83.43	
Labour hold		Swing		

General election 1955: Stalybridge and Hyde
Party	Candidate	Votes	%	±%
Labour	Fred Blackburn	23,617	50.16	
Conservative	Idris Owen	23,462	49.84	
Majority		155	0.32	
Turnout		47,079	83.53	
Labour hold		Swing		

General election 1951: Stalybridge and Hyde
Party	Candidate	Votes	%	±%
Labour	Fred Blackburn	25,402	50.30	
Conservative	Douglas Glover	25,104	49.70	
Majority		298	0.60	
Turnout		50,506	87.45	
Labour hold		Swing		

General election 1950: Stalybridge and Hyde
Party	Candidate	Votes	%	±%
Labour	Gordon Lang	23,462	46.55	
Conservative	Douglas Glover	21,619	42.89	
Liberal	Donald Fletcher Burden	4,930	9.78	
Communist	DP Herrick	389	0.77	N/A
Majority		1,843	3.66	
Turnout		50,400	87.72	
Labour hold		Swing		

=== Elections in the 1940s ===
General election 1945: Stalybridge and Hyde
Party	Candidate	Votes	%	±%
Labour	Gordon Lang	20,597	44.71	
Conservative	Horace Trevor-Cox	16,227	35.23	
Liberal	Donald Fletcher Burden	9,240	20.06	N/A
Majority		4,370	9.48	N/A
Turnout		46,064	80.69	
Labour gain from Conservative		Swing		

General Election 1939–40: Another general election was required to take place before the end of 1940. The political parties had been making preparations for an election to take place from 1939 and by the end of this year, the following candidates had been selected;

- Conservative: Horace Trevor-Cox
- Labour: Gordon Lang

=== Elections in the 1930s ===
1937 Stalybridge and Hyde by-election
Party	Candidate	Votes	%	±%
Conservative	Horace Trevor-Cox	21,901	50.4	−5.1
Labour	Gordon Lang	21,567	49.6	+5.1
Majority		334	0.8	−10.3
Turnout		43,468		
Conservative hold		Swing		

General election 1935: Stalybridge and Hyde
Party	Candidate	Votes	%	±%
Conservative	Philip Dunne	25,502	55.53	
Labour	Roland Casasola	20,421	44.47	
Majority		5,081	11.06	
Turnout		45,923	78.66	
Conservative hold		Swing		

General election 1931: Stalybridge and Hyde
Party	Candidate	Votes	%	±%
Conservative	Sydney Hope	27,557	54.4	+18.1
Labour	William Dobbie	14,251	28.1	−13.0
Liberal	Percy Herbert Jones	8,849	17.5	−5.1
Majority		13,306	26.3	N/A
Turnout		50,657	86.9	+0.5
Conservative gain from Labour		Swing		

=== Elections in the 1920s ===
General election 1929: Stalybridge and Hyde
Party	Candidate	Votes	%	±%
Labour	Hugh Hartley Lawrie	20,343	41.1	+7.4
Unionist	Edmund Wood	17,983	36.3	−7.9
Liberal	Percy Herbert Jones	11,186	22.6	+0.5
Majority		2,360	4.8	N/A
Turnout		49,512	86.4	+2.4
Labour gain from Unionist		Swing	+7.6	

General election 1924: Stalybridge and Hyde
Party	Candidate	Votes	%	±%
Unionist	Edmund Wood	16,412	44.2	−2.1
Labour	Walter Fowden	12,509	33.7	N/A
Liberal	J. Lincoln Tattersall	8,201	22.1	−31.6
Majority		3,903	10.5	N/A
Turnout		37,122	84.0	+11.8
Unionist gain from Liberal		Swing		

General election 1923: Stalybridge and Hyde
Party	Candidate	Votes	%	±%
Liberal	J. Lincoln Tattersall	17,082	53.7	+24.4
Unionist	John Rhodes	14,708	46.3	−2.8
Majority		2,374	7.4	N/A
Turnout		31,790	72.2	−8.9
Liberal gain from Unionist		Swing	+13.6	

General election 1922: Stalybridge and Hyde
Party	Candidate	Votes	%	±%
Unionist	John Rhodes	17,216	49.1	−2.3
Liberal	J. Lincoln Tattersall	10,265	29.3	+5.5
Labour	Percy Horace Ward	7,578	21.6	−3.2
Majority		6,951	19.8	−6.8
Turnout		35,059	81.1	+21.1
Unionist hold		Swing		

=== Elections in the 1910s ===
Jacobsen

General election 1918: Stalybridge and Hyde
Party	Candidate	Votes	%	±%
Unionist	John Wood	13,462	51.4	
Labour	Walter Fowden	6,508	24.8	
Liberal	Owen Jacobsen	6,241	23.8	
Majority		6,954	26.6	
Turnout		26,211	60.0	
Unionist win (new seat)				

== See also ==
- List of parliamentary constituencies in Greater Manchester
- History of parliamentary constituencies and boundaries in Cheshire
