= Philip Dunne (Stalybridge and Hyde MP) =

British Army officer and politician (1904–1965)

Captain Philip Russell Rendel Dunne, Lord of the Manor of Leinthall Earls, MC (28 February 1904 – 13 April 1965) was an English soldier and politician.

== Life ==
He was the son of Lieutenant-Colonel Edward Marten Dunne (1864–1944), Liberal Member of Parliament for Walsall (1906–1910), of Gatley Park, Leominster, Herefordshire, by his wife Hon. Grace Rendel (d.1952), J.P., third daughter and co-heiress of the only Lord Rendel of Hatchlands. Educated at Eton and RMC Sandhurst, Dunne joined the 11th Hussars in 1924, and served with the Royal Horse Guards from 1928 to 1932. He married, first, on 29 April 1930 (dissolved by divorce 1944), Margaret Ann Walker, daughter of Thomas Hood Walker of Crosbie Tower, Troon, Ayrshire. They had two sons and a daughter:

- Sir Thomas Dunne, Lord Lieutenant of Herefordshire, and the father of Philip Dunne M.P.
- Martin Dunne, Lord Lieutenant of Warwickshire.
- Philippa Ann Dunne, later Countess Jellicoe, wife of the 2nd Earl Jellicoe.

A member of White's, the Turf and Jockey clubs, Dunne was Joint Master of the Warwickshire Hounds from 1932 to 1935, retiring when elected a Conservative and Unionist Member of Parliament for the Stalybridge and Hyde division of Cheshire at the 1935 general election, with a majority of 5,081 over Labour. He resigned from the House of Commons in 1937 by becoming Steward of the Chiltern Hundreds.

In the Second World War Dunne was a British Commando in the No. 8 (Guards) Commando, serving in the White's Club group of the Layforce Commandos (Special Service Troop) in the Middle East, having sailed there in early 1941 with Evelyn Waugh, Randolph Churchill, George Jellicoe, David Stirling, and others. His Military Cross was awarded in 1943. He married, secondly, on 18 September 1945 Audrey Mary, daughter of Charles Ringham Simpson, of Ramsay St. Mary's, Huntingdonshire and widow of Bernard Rubin (d. 1936).

He died in 1965 at Brompton Hospital in London aged 61.

Of Captain Philip Dunne Lord Lovat wrote:

'Phil Dunne possessed the light touch; also the balanced ease and elegance on a horse so highly commended by Sancho Panza in Don Quixote. This seat and its look depends as much on quiet hands as long, slim legs, and here he had the pull over all his contemporaries. I think he was Riding Master in the Blues when I first saw him (thirty-five years ago next season) going great guns across the big Grafton country after a Hunt Ball; the blood horse, his own good looks, turn-out and style - possibly a reputation of the kind that jumps in and out over locked railway gates at Weedon - made the same vivid impression as the redoubtable 'Boots Brownrigg' left on a youthful Sherston in the story immortalised by Siegfried Sassoon.
Such a heady image could only fade away, or end in a Cottage Hospital, and the dashing hero of those undergraduate days did less than justice to the man, for Phil was never competitive, but simply a law unto himself; this told against him at a time when he should have been getting on in the world, for then, as now, a certain pomposity was expected from every ambitious young man. The lack of it could prevent first-class ability being taken seriously. Phil was neither pompous nor ambitious, nor did he suffer fools gladly. He had the kind of twinkle that sometimes debunked and seldom reassured his superiors.
Perhaps his heart was never in peacetime soldiering; he soon tired of the House of Commons, and even his routine duties as Master of the Warwickshire Hounds irked his restless nature. Everything he set out to do he did extremely well, and yet one sensed he was thoroughly dissatisfied.
The war came at the right moment for Philip Dunne. In a commando raised from the Brigade of Guards and Household Cavalry, with many of his best friends serving in the ranks, all under the command of Bob Laycock, he truly found himself, and emerged from the crucible a kinder, happier and very much loved man.'

Major-General Sir Robert Laycock wrote:

'Bravery and gaiety are the first two words that spring to the minds of those of us who were Philip's friends and that must include all who knew him for his charm was inimitable. Some of that charm lay in the fact that personal ambition was wholly lacking in his character and, though everything he undertook in a diversity of fields he tackled with spectacular ability, the limelight was anathema to him. At Eton he won the Quarter Mile and was probably one of the best flies whoever played the Field because he thought it more worth while to play in the House side which, as Captain of Games, he led to victory in the House Cup. Being a born leader and a superb horseman he could have commanded The Blues, but he realized that the days of the horsed cavalry were over and, not being mechanically minded, he left the Army. In the Second World War he volunteered to join the Commandos on their inception and served with them with distinction. Being the bravest of the brave it is not surprising that he was decorated with the Military Cross for gallantry in the field. He was a superb leader and hero-worshipped by his subordinates but, because he admired the rank and file who served under him and wanted to get to grips with the enemy in the closest contact with them, he preferred to remain a Troop Leader rather than take a much higher command which was offered him. In the days of peace which followed he loved racing and was a successful breeder and owner. He was made a member of the Jockey Club and the racing world will miss him as sadly as do all of us to whom his loyalty, courage, optimism and friendship are irreplaceable' (from The Times, 21 April 1965).

Evelyn Waugh (1903–1966) often refers to his friend, who for the purpose of differentiation (from another Philip Dunne) he called 'Scum' Dunne, in his letters to Nancy Mitford:

'Darling Nancy, ... I went to London for one night for Philip Dunne's wedding- the old number eight commando gang in force and champagne in cascades' (25 September 1945)
'Darling Nancy, ...It was heaven to get home, to walk into White's and find Sykes & Dunne & Stavordale all drunk & eating grouse, and to hear a member of committee say that Quennell had 'not a hope in hell' of election.' (29 August 1949)

The last paragraph of Waugh's last diary, written on Easter Day 1965, read:

'On Maundy Thursday appeared a notice in the paper under the heading 'Death of Former Unionist MP'. I did not recognise this as Phil Dunne until Christopher Sykes told me on Saturday. He was my age. I last saw him just before Christmas, elegant gay, and I thought how little he had aged compared with myself. He was completely selfish without an element of conceit or self-assertion, debonair, never boring, never morose; a finely controlled temptation to malice; chivalrous, with a sense of private honour uncommon nowadays. Though I saw him seldom in late years, a deeply valued friend whom I shall miss bitterly'.

Parliament of the United Kingdom
Preceded by Sydney Hope	Member of Parliament for Stalybridge and Hyde; 1935–1937	Succeeded by Horace Trevor-Cox
