= Fred Blackburn =

British Labour Party politician (1902–1990)

Fred Blackburn (29 July 1902 – 1 May 1990) was a British Labour Party politician who was the Member of Parliament (MP) for Stalybridge and Hyde from the 1951 general election until 1970.

== Early life ==
Blackburn was educated at Queen Elizabeth's Grammar School, Blackburn, St John's College, Battersea and Manchester University. He became a teacher of modern languages and careers master at North Manchester High School. He served as a councillor on Middleton town council for ten years and published books on local government reform.

== Political career ==
Blackburn stood for Parliament at the 1950 election in Macclesfield without success, but was elected for Stalybridge and Hyde in 1951.

He successfully defended his seat in the subsequent general elections in 1955, 1959, 1964 and 1966, but did not contest the 1970 general election.

Parliament of the United Kingdom
Preceded by Rev. Gordon Lang	Member of Parliament for Stalybridge and Hyde; 1951–1970	Succeeded by Tom Pendry
