= Alfred (given name) =

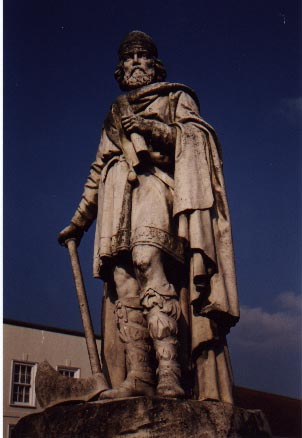
- Statue in Wantage, England, of Alfred the Great, king of England from 871 to 899
- Gender: Masculine
- Name day: January 3 (Sweden, Norway)

Origin
- Language: English
- Origin: Germanic
- Meaning: From the Anglo-Saxon name Ælfrǣd, formed from the Germanic words ælf, meaning "elf", and rǣd, meaning "counsel"

Other names
- Nicknames: Al, Alf, Alfy, Alfie, Fred, Freddy
- Cognates: Ælfrǣd (Anglo-Saxon); Alfreð (Icelandic); Alfréd (Hungarian, Slovak); Alfred (Catalan); Alfredo (Italian, Portuguese, Spanish); Alfrēds (Latvian); Alfredas (Lithuanian); Alfredi (Albanian); Fredo (diminutive of Alfredo)

Alfred is a masculine given name of English origin, a modern descendant of the Anglo-Saxon name Ælfrǣd (Old English pronunciation: [ˈæɫvræːd]), formed from the Germanic words ælf, meaning "elf", and rǣd, meaning "counsel". Its feminine form originating from Romance languages is Alfreda, and diminutives of Alfred include Al, Alf, Alfy, Alfie, Fred, and Freddy. After the 11th-century Norman Conquest, many variants of the name emerged, most of which were not carried to the modern day. Today, Alfred is still in regular usage in a number of different regions, especially Great Britain, Africa, Scandinavia, and North America. It is one of the few Old English names that came into common use in Europe. Its name day is 3 January in both Norway and Sweden.

== Given name ==
=== Royalty and politicians ===
- Alfred the Great (848/849–899), 9th-century king of Wessex (871–886) and first King of the Anglo-Saxons (886–899)
- Alfred Ætheling (c. 1012–1036), son of King Æthelred II of England
- Alfred, Duke of Saxe-Coburg and Gotha (1844–1900), second son and fourth child of Queen Victoria of the United Kingdom and Prince Albert of Saxe-Coburg and Gotha
- Alfred, Hereditary Prince of Saxe-Coburg and Gotha (1874–1899), grandson of Queen Victoria and son of Alfred, Duke of Saxe-Coburg and Gotha
- Alfred Balch (1785–1853), American businessman, lawyer, political advisor, and judge
- Alfred Bansard des Bois (1848–1920), French politician
- Alfred Winsor Brown (1885–1938), governor of Guam
- Alfred Budge (1868–1951), justice of the Idaho Supreme Court
- Alfred Burvill (fl. 1920s), Australian politician
- Alfred Deakin (1856–1919), 2nd prime minister of Australia
- Alfred Joseph Richard de Soysa (1869–1939), Sri Lankan Sinhala landowner and member of the Legislative Council of Ceylon
- Alfred Dregger (1920–2002), German politician
- Alf Dubs (born 1932), British politician and member of the House of Lords, who fled Czechoslovakia as a child due to the German invasion and travelled on the Kindertransport
- Alfred William Frisby (1897–1973), British colonial administrator
- Alfred Gusenbauer (born 1960), Austrian politician
- Alfred C. Harmer (1825–1900), American politician
- Alfred Josoa (born 1943), Malagasy politician
- Alfred Käärmann (1922–2010), Estonian freedom fighter
- Alfred John King (1859–1920), British politician
- Alfred Kollie (1951–2020), Liberian politician
- Alfred A. Lama (1899–1984), Italian-American architect and politician
- Alf Landon (1887–1987), American politician
- Alfred Lecerf (1948–2019), Belgian politician
- Alfred Lerandeau (born 1939), American politician
- Alfred Morisset (1874–1952), Canadian politician
- Alfred Mtsi (1950/1951–2020), South African politician
- Alfred Mpontshane (born 1952), South African politician
- Al Smith (1873–1944), American statesman
- Alfred Solstad (1884–1973), American farmer and politician
- Alfred von Schlieffen (1833–1913), German field marshal and strategist
- Alfred Thambiayah (1903–unknown), Sri Lankan Tamil businessman and member of parliament

=== Writers and philosophers ===
- Alfred Bester (1913–1987), American science fiction author
- Alfred Döblin (1878–1957), German novelist, essayist, and doctor
- Alfred Jarry (1873–1907), French writer and founder of 'pataphysics
- Alfred Daniel Williams King (1930–1969), American minister and civil rights activist
- Alfred Kolleritsch (1931–2020), Austrian journalist, poet, writer and philosopher
- Alfred Korzybski (1879–1950), Polish philosopher
- Alfred de Musset (1810–1857), French romantic poet and playwright
- Alfred W. Pollard (1859–1944), English bibliographer and scholar of English literature
- Alfred Richard Orage (1873–1934), British teacher, writer, editor, publisher
- Alfred Rosenberg (1893–1946), German Nazi theorist
- Alfred, Lord Tennyson (1809–1892), British poet
- Alfred de Vigny (1797–1863), French romantic poet
- Alfred North Whitehead (1861–1947), English analytic philosopher and mathematician, co-author of Principia Mathematica

=== Athletes ===
- Alfred Aboya (born 1985), Cameroonian basketball player
- Alfred Bloch (1878–1902), French Olympic footballer
- Alfred Butch Lee (born 1956), retired Puerto Rican basketball player
- Alfred Eissler (1896–1954), American football player
- Alfred Albert Joe de Re la Gardiur (1881–1941), Luxembourgish-American wrestler
- Alfred Guth (1908–1996), Austrian-born American water polo player, swimmer, and Olympic modern pentathlete
- Alf King (born 1941), Australian footballer
- Alfred Kipketer (born 1996), Kenyan middle-distance runner and 2013 world youth champion
- Alfred Kivisaar (1953–2021), Estonian badminton player
- Alfred König (1913–1987), Austrian-Turkish Olympic sprinter
- Alfred Kuchevsky (1931–2000), Soviet professional ice hockey player
- Alfred McCullough (born 1989), American football player
- Alfred Morris (born 1988), American football player
- Alfred Neuland (1895–1966), Estonian weightlifter
- Alfred Puusaag (1897–1951), Estonian weightlifter
- Alf Ramsey (1920–1999), English football manager
- Alfred Schmidt (1898–1972), Estonian weightlifter
- Alfred Skrobisch (1913–1991), American fencer
- Alfred Stöhrmann (1882–1914), German football player
- Alfred Tetteh (born 1975), Ghanaian boxer

=== Businessmen ===
- Alfred Cartier (1841–1925), French businessman and jeweller, second generation heir of the jewelry house Cartier
- Alfred O. Deshong (1837–1913), American businessman, philanthropist and art collector
- Alfred Ford (born 1950), heir to the Ford family fortune
- Alfred S. Hart (1904–1979), American businessman and banker
- Alfred Hurst (1846–1912), English-born American politician and businessman
- Alfred Herrhausen (1930–1989), German banker
- Alfred Lindon (c. 1868–1948), businessman and art collector
- Alfred Lion (1908–1987), American record executive
- Alfred Peet (1920–2007), Dutch-American founder of Peet's Coffee
- Alfred Pisani (born 1939), Maltese businessman and hotelier
- Alfred Douglas Price (1860–1921), African American businessperson and community leader
- Alfred de Rothschild (1842–1918), English banker, art collector and diplomat, director of the Bank of England, member of the Rothschild family
- Alfred Sung (born 1948), Canadian fashion designer and businessman

=== Artists and entertainers ===
- Alfred Biolek (1934–2021), German entertainer and television producer
- Alfred Brendel (1931–2025), Czech-born Austrian classical pianist, poet and essayist
- Alfred Buckham (1879–1956), British photographer
- Alfred Gerald Caplin (1909–1979), American cartoonist and humorist better known as "Al Capp"
- Alfred Deller (1912–1979), English singer
- Alfred Edirimanne (1929–2000), Sri Lankan Sinhala cinema actor and politician
- Alfred Eisenstaedt (1898–1995), German-born American photographer and photojournalist
- Alfred Enoch (born 1988), British actor
- Alfred Godwin (1850–1934), English-born, American stained-glass artist
- Alfred Hill (1924–1992), English comedian better known as "Benny Hill"
- Alfred Hirv (1880–1918), Estonian painter
- Alfred Hitchcock (1899–1980), English film director
- Alfred Koerppen (1926–2022), German organist, composer, and teacher
- Alfred Leslie (1927–2023), American artist and filmmaker
- Alfred Lipka (1931–2010), German violist
- Alfred Molina (born 1953), British actor
- Alfred Momotenko Levitsky (born 1970), Russian-Dutch composer
- Alfred Rasser (1907–1977), Swiss comedian, radio personality, and actor
- Alfred Ryder (1916–1995), American film, radio, and television actor
- Alfred Schnittke (1934–1998), German-Soviet composer
- Alfred Stieglitz (1864–1946), American photographer and modern art promoter

=== Military people ===
- Alfred Dreyfus (1859–1935), French Jewish artillery officer wrongly accused of treason
- Alfred Jodl (1890–1946), German Wehrmacht general who was executed following the Nuremberg trials
- Alfred Thayer Mahan (1840–1914), American naval strategist and historian
- Alfred C. Markley (1843–1926), American brigadier general
- Alfred K. Newman (1924–2019), United States Marine and Navajo code talker
- Alfred Oliver Pollard (1893–1960), British Army officer with the Honourable Artillery Company, Victoria Cross and Military Cross recipient, author of crime and mystery books
- Alfred Saalwächter (1883–1945), German naval officer executed for war crimes
- Alfred Sully (1820–1879), U.S. Army Colonel and Union Army Brevet Brigadier General
- Alfred Trzebinski (1902–1946), German SS physician at several Nazi concentration camps executed for war crimes
- Alfred Zeidler (born 1902, date of death unknown), German SS concentration camp commandant

=== Scientists ===
- Alfred L. Elwyn (1804–1884), American physician and pioneer in the training and care of mentally disabled people
- Alfred Douglas Hardy (1870–1958), Australian botanist
- Alfred Hoche (1865–1943), German psychiatrist, eugenicist, used pseudonym Alred Erich for poetry publication
- Alfred Kinsey (1894–1956), American entomologist, zoologist, and human sexuality researcher
- Alfred Marshall (1842–1924), English economist
- Alfred Newton (1829–1907), English zoologist and ornithologist
- Alfred Nobel (1833–1896), Swedish chemist and engineer
- Alfred Ploetz (1860–1940), German physician, biologist, Social Darwinist, and eugenicist
- Alfred Stillé (1813–1900), American physician
- Alfred Elis Törnebohm, Swedish geologist
- Alfred Wilhelm Volkmann (1801–1877), German physiologist, anatomist, and philosopher
- Alfred Russel Wallace (1823–1913), British naturalist, explorer, geographer, anthropologist, and biologist, who independently conceived the theory of evolution through natural selection
- Alfred Wegener (1880–1930), German earth and weather scientist

== Fictional characters ==
- Alfred, alchemist and playable character in Bloodstained: Curse of the Moon
- Alfred, Sartan character from the novel Dragon Wing and other books of The Death Gate Cycle
- Alfred, nickname of the nature spirit Demonreach, a minor character in The Dresden Files
- Alfred, character in the video game series Fatal Fury
- Alfred, a playable character in the video game Fire Emblem Engage
- Alfred the Hot Water Bottle, from Australian children's television series Johnson and Friends
- Alfred, major character, a penguin, in the Franco-Belgian comic strip Zig et Puce
- Alfred Alembick, character from King Ottokar's Sceptre
- Alfred Doolittle, father of Eliza Doolittle in Pygmalion and My Fair Lady
- Alfred Garnett, lead character in the British sitcom Till Death Us Do Part (1965–1975)
- Alfred Hedgehog, main character of the French-Canadian animated TV series The Mysteries of Alfred Hedgehog
- Alfred F. Jones, personification of the United States of America and leader of the Allied Powers in the anime Hetalia by Hidekaz Himaruya
- Alfred J. Kwak, main character of the eponymous Dutch-Japanese anime television series
- Alfred E. Neuman, mascot and iconic cover boy of Mad magazine
- Alfred Pennyworth, butler to DC Comics superhero Batman
- Alfred Tezlaff, lead character in the German sitcom Ein Herz und eine Seele (1973–1976), based on Alfred Garnett
- Alfred, a localized name for Kazuma Kuwabara (see list of YuYu Hakusho characters), in the Tagalog dub of YuYu Hakusho (known in the Philippines as Ghost Fighter)
- Alfred Debling, a character in Bridgerton.

=== Other ===
- Alfred of Sareshel (12th–13th century), English translator
- Alfred of Sherborne (10th century), English bishop
- Alfred Francis (before 1909 – after 1919), Welsh rugby player
- Sir Alfred Mehran (1946–2022), birth name Mehran Karimi Nasseri, Iranian refugee
- Alfred Packer (1842–1907), American cannibal
- Alfred Westou, (11th century), English priest and relic collector
- Alfred Worden (1932–2020), American astronaut, business executive, and author

== See also ==
- Alfredo
