= Alfred King =

Alfred King may refer to:

- Alfred Daniel King (1930–1969), American Baptist minister and civil rights activist
- Alfred John King (1859–1920), British Liberal Party politician
- Alf King (Alfred N. King, born 1941), Australian rules footballer
