= Baron Sherfield =

Barony in the Peerage of the United Kingdom

Barony Sherfield
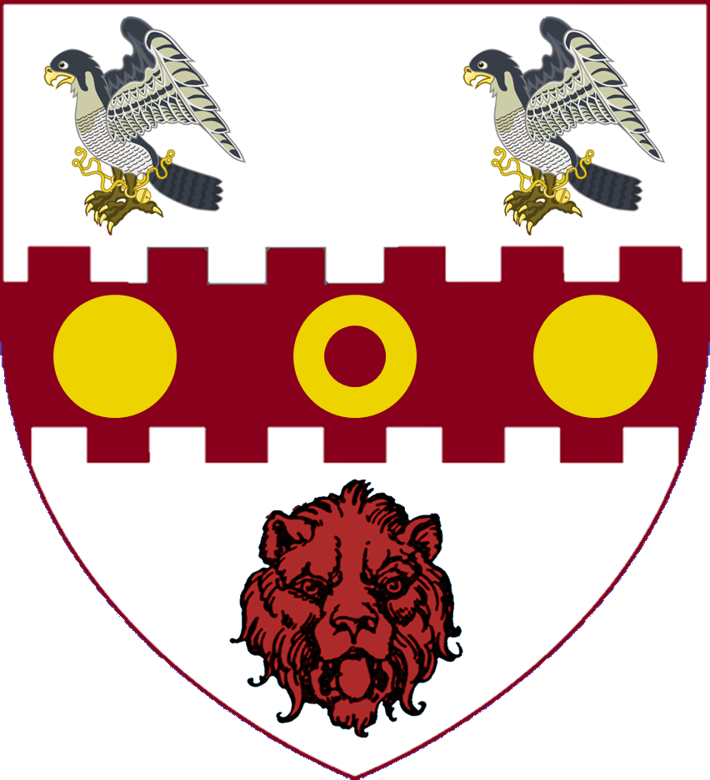
- Creation date: 1964
- Created by: Queen Elizabeth II
- Peerage: Peerage of the United Kingdom
- First holder: Roger Makins, 1st Baron Sherfield
- Present holder: Dwight William Makins, 3rd Baron Sherfield
- Remainder to: 1st Baron's heirs male of the body lawfully begotten
- Status: Extant

Baron Sherfield, of Sherfield-on-Loddon in the County of Southampton, Is a title in the Peerage of the United Kingdom. It was created in 1964 for the diplomat Sir Roger Makins. He had previously served as British Ambassador to the United States. His eldest son, the second Baron, was a leading expert on national security and defence issues. As of 2010 the title is held by the latter's younger brother, the third Baron, who succeeded in 2006.

Sir Ernest Makins, father of the first baron, was a brigadier-general in the army and member of parliament for Knutsford. Another member of the Makins family was the politician Sir William Makins, 1st Baronet. He was the elder brother of Henry Thomas Makins, grandfather of the first Baron Sherfield.

== Barons Sherfield (1964) ==
- Roger Mellor Makins, 1st Baron Sherfield (1904–1996)
  - Christopher James Makins, 2nd Baron Sherfield (1942–2006)
  - Dwight William Makins, 3rd Baron Sherfield (b. 1951)

There is no heir to the barony.

== See also ==
- Makins Baronets, of Rotherfield Court
