= 1979 Knutsford by-election =

UK parliamentary by-election

The 1979 Knutsford by-election was a by-election held for the British House of Commons constituency of Knutsford in Cheshire on 1 March 1979. It was won by the Conservative Party candidate Jock Bruce-Gardyne.

The by-election took place just over a month before parliament was dissolved (7 April) ahead of the 1979 general election on 3 May.

== Vacancy ==
The seat had become vacant when the Conservative Member of Parliament (MP), John Davies had resigned due to illness on 6 November 1978. He had held the seat since the 1970 general election and had served as Secretary of State for Industry and Chancellor of the Duchy of Lancaster in the Government of Edward Heath, having previously been Director of the Confederation of British Industry.

== Candidates ==
The Conservative candidate was 48-year-old Jock Bruce-Gardyne, who had been MP for South Angus from 1964 until his defeat at the October 1974 general election. The Labour Party candidate was Alan Barton, and the Liberals fielded Robert Ingham. Michael Byrne stood as an Independent Conservative.

== Result ==
The result was a clear victory for Bruce-Gardyne in this Conservative safe seat, with a much increased majority of 16,880. Both the Labour and Liberal vote fell by a few per cent.

Bruce-Gardyne held the seat until its abolition for the 1983 general election, when he was effectively forced out of the Commons due to a reduction of the number of Cheshire seats. He was elevated to the House of Lords in the same year.

Knutsford by-election, 1979
Party	Candidate	Votes	%	±%
Conservative	Jock Bruce-Gardyne	22,086	67.1	+16.1
Liberal	Robert Ingham	5,206	15.8	−10.6
Labour	Alan Barton	5,124	15.6	−7.0
Ind. Conservative	Michael Byrne	486	1.5	New
Majority		16,880	51.3	+26.7
Turnout		32,902		
Conservative hold		Swing	+13.4	

== Previous election ==
General election October 1974: Knutsford
Party	Candidate	Votes	%	±%
Conservative	John Davies	21,636	51.0	−1.5
Liberal	B. Lomax	11,210	26.4	−1.4
Labour	D.L. Swain	9.565	22.6	+2.9
Majority		10,426	24.6	−0.1
Turnout		42,411	76.8	
Conservative hold		Swing		

== See also ==
- Knutsford constituency
- List of United Kingdom by-elections
