= Solstad =

Solstad is a surname. Notable people with the surname include:

- Alfred Solstad (1884–1973), American farmer, businessman, and politician
- Arve Solstad (1935–2016), Norwegian newspaper editor
- Celine Solstad (born 1997), Norwegian handball player
- Dag Solstad (born 1941), Norwegian novelist, short-story writer, and dramatist
- Nils Solstad (born 1963), Norwegian football defender
- Thomas Solstad (born 1997), Norwegian handball player

== See also ==
- SS Solstad (1916), steam cargo ship
- Solstad Church, in Bindal municipality in Nordland county, Norway
- Solstad Offshore, Norwegian offshore service and supply ship shipping company
