= Angus South =

Angus South may refer to:

- Angus South (Scottish Parliament constituency), 2011–present
- South Angus (UK Parliament constituency), 1950–1983
