= East Angus =

East Angus may refer to:

- East Angus (UK Parliament constituency)
- East Angus, Quebec
