= Jock Bruce-Gardyne =

British politician

The Right Honourable The Lord Bruce-Gardyne

Economic Secretary to the Treasury
- In office 11 November 1981 – 13 June 1983
- Prime Minister: Margaret Thatcher
- Preceded by: Vacant
- Succeeded by: John Moore

Member of Parliament for Knutsford
- In office 1 March 1979 – 13 May 1983
- Preceded by: John Davies
- Succeeded by: Neil Hamilton (for Tatton)

Member of Parliament for South Angus
- In office 15 October 1964 – 20 September 1974
- Preceded by: James Duncan
- Succeeded by: Andrew Welsh

Personal details
- Born: John Bruce-Gardyne; 12 April 1930 Chertsey, Surrey, England
- Died: 15 April 1990 (aged 60) Kensington and Chelsea, London, England
- Party: Conservative
- Other political affiliations: Unionist (until 1965)
- Occupation: politician

John Bruce-Gardyne, Baron Bruce-Gardyne (12 April 1930 – 15 April 1990), was a British Conservative Party politician.

Son of Captain Evan Bruce-Gardyne, DSO, RN, 13th Laird of Middleton, and a member of a Scottish landholding family who have been based in the county of Angus since at least 1008 AD, he was born in Chertsey, Surrey. Bruce-Gardyne was educated at Twyford School, Winchester College and Magdalen College, Oxford, and then served for six years in Foreign Service before becoming a journalist. He was a council member of the Bow Group.

At the 1964 general election, he was elected as the Member of Parliament for South Angus where the family seats of Gardyne Castle, Finavon Castle and Middleton all stood. He held the seat until the October 1974 general election, when he lost to Andrew Welsh of the Scottish National Party. Bruce-Gardyne was later elected as the MP for Knutsford at a by-election in 1979, but was effectively forced out of the House of Commons when the seat was abolished by boundary changes for the 1983 general election. He was a monetarist and was opposed to the Falklands War and was an independent-minded MP. His well-known publication, Meriden: Odyssey Of A Lame Duck, virulently attacked Tony Benn's creation of the Meriden Workers' Co-operative to continue production of Triumph Motorcycles. He was succeeded in the new Tatton seat by Neil Hamilton. He was created a life peer as Baron Bruce-Gardyne, of Kirkden in the District of Angus, on 7 October 1983.

He married Sally Louisa Mary Maitland, daughter of Commander Sir John Maitland, in 1959. He died of a brain tumour in Kensington and Chelsea at the age of sixty.

== Footnotes ==
Parliament of the United Kingdom
Preceded by Sir James Duncan, Bt.	Member of Parliament for South Angus; 1964 – October 1974	Succeeded by Andrew Welsh
Preceded by John Davies	Member of Parliament for Knutsford; 1979–1983	Constituency abolished
