= John Davies (British businessman) =

British businessman and politician (1916–1979)

The Right Honourable John Davies MBE
- Davies in 1973

Shadow Foreign Secretary
- In office 11 April 1976 – 6 November 1978
- Leader: Margaret Thatcher
- Preceded by: Reginald Maudling
- Succeeded by: Francis Pym

Chancellor of the Duchy of Lancaster
- In office 5 November 1972 – 5 March 1974
- Prime Minister: Edward Heath
- Preceded by: Geoffrey Rippon
- Succeeded by: Harold Lever

President of the Board of Trade
- In office 15 October 1970 – 5 November 1972
- Prime Minister: Edward Heath
- Preceded by: Michael Noble
- Succeeded by: Peter Walker

Secretary of State for Trade & Industry
- In office 15 October 1970 – 5 November 1972
- Prime Minister: Edward Heath
- Preceded by: Post established
- Succeeded by: Peter Walker

Minister of Technology
- In office 28 July 1970 – 15 October 1970
- Prime Minister: Edward Heath
- Preceded by: Geoffrey Rippon
- Succeeded by: Position abolished

Director of the Confederation of British Industry
- In office 30 July 1965 – 15 October 1969
- Preceded by: Position established
- Succeeded by: Campbell Adamson

Member of Parliament for Knutsford
- In office 18 June 1970 – 6 November 1978
- Preceded by: Walter Bromley-Davenport
- Succeeded by: Jock Bruce-Gardyne

Personal details
- Born: John Emerson Harding Harding-Davies; 8 January 1916 London, England
- Died: 4 July 1979 (aged 63) London, England
- Party: Conservative
- Spouse: Vera Bates (m. 1943)
- Children: 2, including Frank
- Education: St Edward's School, Oxford
- Profession: Businessman

John Emerson Harding Harding-Davies, MBE (8 January 1916 – 4 July 1979) was a British businessman who served as director-general of the Confederation of British Industry during the 1960s. He later went into politics and served in the Cabinet of Edward Heath as the first Secretary of State for Trade and Industry, a position which he held from October 1970 to 4 November 1972. Davies was President of the Board of Trade, and from July to October 1970 was Minister of Technology. He became a Privy Councillor and, in 1972, was appointed Chancellor of the Duchy of Lancaster with special responsibilities for the co-ordination of British policy towards the European Communities. In 1979 Davies was to be made a life peer as Baron Harding-Davies, but died before the creation of the peerage passed the Great Seal. Peerage history was made when, by Royal Warrant bearing the date 27 February 1980, Queen Elizabeth II granted his widow Vera Georgina the title of Lady Harding-Davies; his children Frank Davies and Rosamond Ann Metherell were given the rank of children of a life peer.

== Family and early life ==
Davies was born in Blackheath, London, on 8 January 1916, the second son of Arnold Thomas Davies (1882–1966) a Chartered accountant from Folkestone, by his wife Edith Minnie Harding (1880–1962) only child of Captain Francis Dallas Harding (1839–1902) - see Harding of Baraset - and Minnie Mary Malchus of Calcutta. Davies went to Windlesham House School in Sussex and St Edward's School, Oxford. He followed his father into accountancy as an articled clerk from 1934; he had just obtained professional qualifications as the youngest Chartered accountant in the country in 1939, when the outbreak of World War II led him to enlist in the Royal Army Service Corps. Davies was commissioned as a Second Lieutenant and spent most of the war in the Combined Operations headquarters. From 1945 he worked for Combined Operations Experimental Establishment (COXE), and received the MBE on demobilization in 1946. On 8 January 1943, he married Vera Georgina Bates, only child of George William Bates, Managing Director of Barratts Shoes, by his wife Elvina Rosa Taylor. The marriage produced two children; a daughter - Rosamond Ann, and a son - Francis William Harding Davies (Frank Davies).

== Business career ==
He joined the Anglo-Iranian Oil Company as an accountant in the marketing division. He qualified as a Fellow of the Institute of Chartered Accountants in 1949. Davies worked for the company in London, Stockholm and Paris; the company becoming part of BP in 1954. In 1956, Davies was promoted to be General Manager (Markets) for BP, and in 1960 he was Director of BP Trading.

The next year, Davies was appointed as Vice-Chairman and Managing Director of Shell-Mex & BP, becoming the youngest man ever to hold the post. This position put him in charge of a national chain of petrol stations. He also became a Director of Hill Samuel. Due to his position he was made a member of the grand council of the Federation of British Industry, and chaired a committee on technical legislation. His conduct on that committee was regarded as impressive.

== CBI Director-General ==
The Federation merged with British Employers' Federation and the National Association of British Manufacturers in 1965 to form the Confederation of British Industry. Davies was appointed as its Director-General from that July, wanting the organisation to have a much higher profile than its predecessors. He supported initiatives such as the National Economic Development Council where government, employers and Trade unions met to discuss the economy, and set up a joint CBI-TUC joint committee. He was also supportive of British entry into the European Community when the government applied in 1967.

Davies surprised some, such as Enoch Powell in May 1967, when he made a speech in California in which he observed that the Labour government's measures to keep pay and prices down were working; Powell considered this not only untrue but an example of collaboration in which "the very spokesmen of capitalism" were doing the work of the socialists. As CBI chief, Davies had some quango appointments as a member of the British Productivity Council, the British National Export Council and the Council of Industrial Design. He was briefly a member of the Public Schools Commission.

However Davies was a Conservative by instinct and after the devaluation of the Pound sterling in November 1967, he became much more critical of the government. Increasingly he would lambast Labour ministers on television, although he continued to work together with Ministers in private. Davies handed over the title of Director-General to Campbell Adamson in 1969.

== Political career ==
In 1969, Davies was recruited by Edward Heath to join his government once he won the next election. Heath was looking to lead a 'businesslike' government and believed that senior business figures serving in senior posts would provide more expert management. Davies began to be more quotably critical, describing the "solemn and binding" accord between the government and the TUC (after the failure of In Place of Strife) as useful only in the lavatory.

He failed to win the selection for the Conservative nomination at the Louth byelection of 1969, and for Cities of London and Westminster for the general election. However, with Central Office support, Davies was found a seat at Knutsford in Cheshire, which he easily won in the general election on 18 June 1970.

== Trade and Industry ==
That October, Davies was promoted to be Secretary of State for Trade and Industry, a new department set up by Heath. He introduced himself at the Conservative Party Conference with a speech which reiterated Heath's pre-election policy of refusing to intervene in industry. The phrase most closely associated with him was said in the House of Commons on 4 November, when Davies said:

"We believe that the essential need of the country is to gear its policies to the great majority of people, who are not 'lame ducks', who do not need a hand, who are quite capable of looking after their own interests and only demand to be allowed to do so." (Hansard, 5th Series, volume 805, column 1211)

The term "lame ducks" became associated with Davies. However, when Rolls-Royce (a vital defence contractor) ran into financial difficulties early in 1971, it was decided that the government should help by bailing it out. When nugatory efforts did not help, the company was nationalised to prevent it from going bankrupt.

In June 1971, the Upper Clyde Shipbuilders went into receivership after the government refused it a £6 million loan. The workers at the yard, led by Communist shop stewards, decided to hold a 'work-in' when they occupied the yard and continued production. This industrial action tended to refute claims that trade unions were work-shy and was therefore embarrassing to the government. Davies' London home was firebombed by the Angry Brigade on 31 July 1971. In February 1972, the government changed its policy and decided to retain three of the four shipyards at a cost of £35 million, although Davies knew they would never operate on a commercial basis.

== Chancellor of the Duchy of Lancaster ==
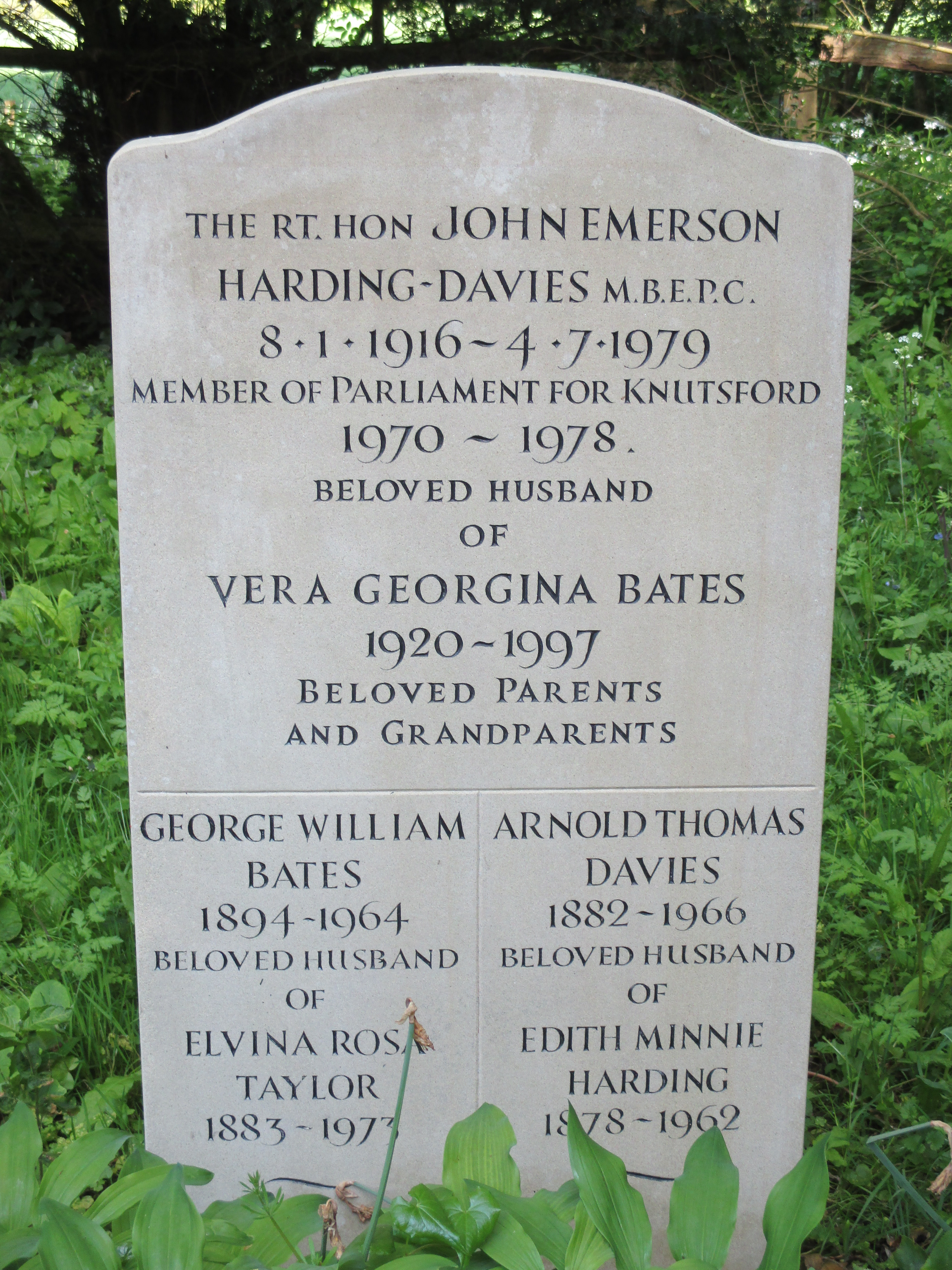
Gravestone of John Davies and his family in Shermanbury Parish Cemetery

Davies moved sideways to become Chancellor of the Duchy of Lancaster in November 1972, with special responsibility for British relations with the European Community which Britain joined on 1 January 1973. Davies' role was predominantly behind the scenes in making sure British law was in compliance with European law. In Cabinet discussions, Davies advocated a confrontational approach to the trade unions, although he feared for the future.

== Opposition ==
After Heath left office in 1974, Davies retained his Parliamentary seat but was not given a post in the Shadow Cabinet. He resumed his directorship of Hill Samuel. From May he took the Chairmanship of the European Scrutiny Committee of the House of Commons, examining the details of legislation, and won a strong reputation for looking in detail at the regulations coming out of the EC institutions. In 1975, Davies campaigned for a 'Yes' vote in the referendum on EC membership.

Davies was nominated by the Conservative Party as a European Commissioner for the term beginning in 1977, but was unacceptable to the Labour government. However, in November 1976 Margaret Thatcher decided to sack Reginald Maudling as Shadow Foreign Secretary and appointed Davies to replace him. Thatcher's memoirs give praise for the effectiveness of Davies' work in the role.

Davies was not a strong supporter of monetarism, although he did agree with Thatcher's view on Soviet expansionism. The major disagreement within the Conservative Party was over Rhodesia and whether to continue sanctions on the government of Ian Smith: Davies believed that Smith was not entirely committed to a negotiated peace and therefore that sanctions should be maintained.

== Illness and death ==
Davies was diagnosed with a malignant brain tumour in 1978 and swiftly stood down from the Shadow Cabinet and from Parliament. Davies was granted the position of Steward of the Manor of Northstead on 6 November 1978. In the Queen's birthday honours list of 1979, he was awarded a life peerage, but he died on 4 July 1979, before the patent of creation passed the Great Seal and it became a Ghost Honour. Peerage history was made when, by Royal Warrant bearing the date 27 February 1980, his widow Vera Georgina was granted the style and title of Baroness Harding-Davies of St. Mellons, indicating the title Davies had intended to take; his children Francis William Harding Harding-Davies and Rosamond Ann Metherell were given the rank of children of life peers.

Parliament of the United Kingdom
Preceded by Walter Bromley-Davenport	Member of Parliament for Knutsford; 1970–1978	Succeeded by Jock Bruce-Gardyne
Business positions
New office	Director of the Confederation of British Industry; 1965–1969	Succeeded by Campbell Adamson
Political offices
Preceded by Geoffrey Rippon	Minister of Technology; 1970	Position abolished
Preceded by Michael Noble	President of the Board of Trade; 1970–1972	Succeeded by Peter Walker
Preceded by Post established	Secretary of State for Trade and Industry; 1970–1972	Succeeded by Peter Walker
Preceded by Geoffrey Rippon	Chancellor of the Duchy of Lancaster; 1972–1974	Succeeded by Harold Lever
Preceded by Reginald Maudling	Shadow Foreign Secretary; 1976–1978	Succeeded by Francis Pym
