= Christopher Makins, 2nd Baron Sherfield =

Anglo-American diplomat, foreign policy expert and author

Christopher James Makins, 2nd Baron Sherfield (23 July 1942 – 28 January 2006) was an Anglo-American diplomat, foreign policy expert, and author.

== Early life ==
Christopher James Makins was born at Southampton, New York on 23 July 1942, the son of a British father Roger Mellor Makins, later 1st Baron Sherfield and an American mother, Alice Brooks Davis, daughter of the American sportsman and politician Dwight F. Davis. Thus he held dual citizenship of the UK and the United States.

He was educated at St Ronan's School, Winchester College, and New College, Oxford. After taking a first-class degree in Modern History in 1963, he was elected a Fellow of All Souls (1963–1977).

== Career ==
From 1964 until 1975, he served in H. M. Diplomatic Service. He and his family lived in Washington, D.C., where he worked for the Trilateral Commission (Deputy Director 1975–1976), the Carnegie Endowment for International Peace, and the Aspen Institute (Executive Vice-president 1989–1997) before becoming President of the Atlantic Council of the United States (1999–2005). He was a Senior Adviser to the German Marshall Fund (1997–1999 and 2005–2006) and President of the Marshall Sherfield Foundation, which he had established in memory of his father.

He wrote or contributed to numerous articles and reports over the course of his career, including The Study of Europe in the United States: A Report to the German Marshall Fund of the United States and the Delegation of the European Commission to the United States (1998).

He was also an art collector and active on the boards of arts organisations such as the Phillips Collection, Washington Concert Opera, and WETA.

== Personal life ==
In 1975, he married American photographer, writer, and illustrator Wendy Whitney Cortesi, daughter of John Sargent Whitney of Evergreen, Colorado and jewellery designer Minna Reese Marston. Together they had a daughter, Marian. Christopher was Wendy's second husband as she was married before to Roger Spencer Cortesi, with whom she had two daughters. After his divorce from Wendy, Roger married Deborah Shapley and had two children with her.

== Death ==
He died from complications of head and neck cancer on 28 January 2006, aged 63, at his home in Georgetown, Washington, D.C.

== Arms ==
Coat of arms of Christopher Makins, 2nd Baron Sherfield
Crest A Dexter Arm embowed in Armour proper encircled by an annulet Or and holding a Flagstaff therefrom flowing a Banner Argent charged with a Lion's Face Gules Escutcheon Argent on a Fess embattled counter embattled Gules between in chief two Falcons proper belled Or and in base a Lion's Face of the second an Annulet Or between two Bezants Supporters Dexter: a Lion Sable pendent from a Chain about the neck Or a Bezant charged with a Model representing an Atom of Lithium 6 Sable; Sinister: a Bald Headed Eagle rising proper adorned likewise about the neck the Bezant charged with a Lawn Tennis Racquet erect gules Motto In Lumine Luce

== Legacy ==
In 2005, the Atlantic Council of the United States established the Christopher J. Makins Lecture Series, which focuses on "the state of the strategic Atlantic partnership, its future direction and the prospects for the furtherance of common European and U.S. interests in order to facilitate strong and lasting global leadership." The inaugural lecture was delivered on 31 May 2006 by The Hon. Zbigniew Brzezinski. Subsequent speakers have included former President of Latvia, Dr. Vaira Vīķe-Freiberga (2007); Dr. Henry Kissinger (2009); and former Secretary General of NATO, Lord George Robertson (2010).

== Sources ==
- Louie Estrada, 'Christopher Makins; Expert on Security Policy', Washington Post, Wednesday, February 1, 2006, p. B06
- Marshall Sherfield Fellowships
- Remembering Christopher Makins
- The Study of Europe in the United States by Christopher J. Makins, Donald Hancock, and Fritz W. Scharpf
- Debrett's People of Today (12th edn, London, 1999), p. 1778

Peerage of the United Kingdom
Preceded by Roger Makins	Baron Sherfield; 1996–2006	Succeeded by Dwight Makins
