= Andrew Welsh (politician) =

Scottish politician (1944–2021)

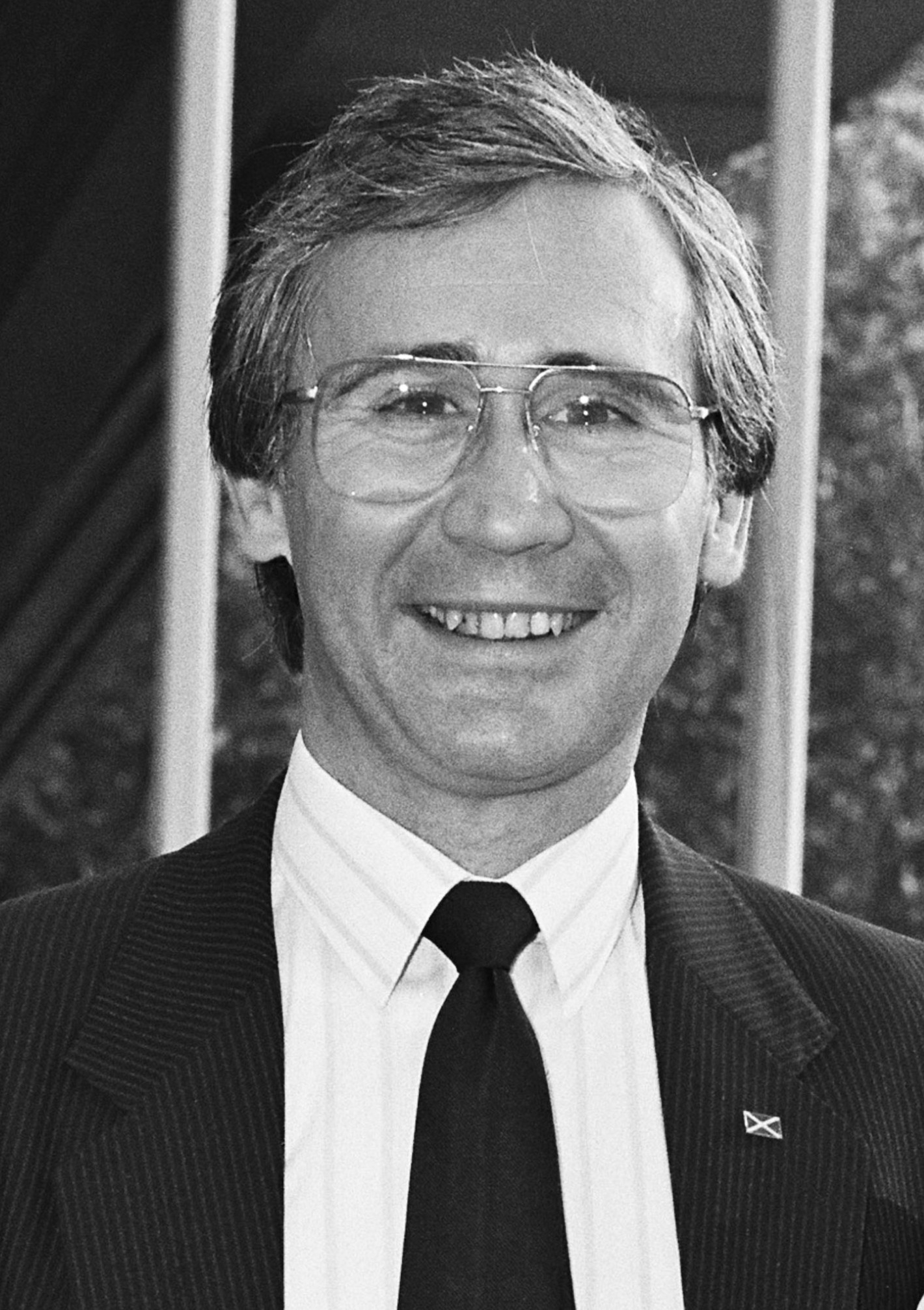
- Andrew Welsh outside the European Parliament in Strasbourg in 1986

Member of the Scottish Parliament for Angus
- In office 6 May 1999 – 22 March 2011
- Preceded by: new constituency
- Succeeded by: constituency abolished

Member of Parliament for Angus East Angus (1987–1997)
- In office 11 June 1987 – 14 May 2001
- Preceded by: Peter Fraser
- Succeeded by: Michael Weir

Member of Parliament for South Angus
- In office 10 October 1974 – 7 April 1979
- Preceded by: Jock Bruce-Gardyne
- Succeeded by: Peter Fraser

Personal details
- Born: Andrew Paton Welsh; 19 April 1944 Glasgow, Scotland
- Died: 17 June 2021 (aged 77) Arbroath, Scotland
- Party: Scottish National Party
- Education: University of Glasgow

Andrew Paton Welsh DL (19 April 1944 – 17 June 2021) was a Scottish politician. He was the Scottish National Party Member of Parliament (MP) for South Angus from October 1974 to 1979, East Angus from 1987 to 1997, and Angus from 1997 to 2001. He was the Member of the Scottish Parliament (MSP) for the constituency of Angus from 1999 to 2011.

== Early life ==
He was born in Glasgow. The youngest of three children, he attended primary school in Cardonald and then educated at Govan High School. In 1967 he went to the University of Glasgow and studied politics and history. Welsh worked as a teacher before he became a politician.

== Parliamentary career ==
=== House of Commons ===
Welsh unsuccessfully contested Central Dunbartonshire in February 1974, coming fourth.

He was elected to South Angus in the October 1974. Following the election, he was announced as the SNP's spokesperson on housing. Welsh returned to Parliament as the MP for East Angus from 1987 to 1997, and Angus from 1997 to 2001.

When the Bill which became the Criminal Justice and Public Order Act 1994 was before the House of Commons, the Conservative MP Edwina Currie introduced an amendment to equalise the ages of consent for homosexual and heterosexual intercourse at 16. Welsh voted against this and against an amendment proposed by the Conservative MP Sir Anthony Durant to reduce the age of consent for homosexual intercourse from 21 to 18.

=== Scottish Parliament ===
In June 1998, Welsh was announced as an SNP candidate for the newly formed Scottish Parliament in the elections that would take place the following year. Welsh was elected as the first Member of the Scottish Parliament (MSP) for the Scottish Parliament constituency of Angus in May 1999. He was appointed to the Scottish Parliamentary Corporate Body (SPCB) during the first years of the Parliament, when the various systems within the Parliament needed to be set up. Welsh served on the SPCB until January 2006, making him the longest serving member of that body.

He was Convener of the Finance Committee from June 2007 to March 2011. Welsh retired as an MSP when his term ended on 22 March 2011, ahead of the 2011 election.

== Outside Parliament ==
From 1984 until 1987, he served as the Provost of Angus, the leader of Angus District Council and on the Governing Court of the University of Dundee. Before being re-elected to the House of Commons at the 1987 general election, he worked as a Senior Lecturer in Business Administration at Arbroath College in Angus.

== Previous positions ==
- SNP spokesperson, local government, housing and education (1997–2005)
- SNP chief whip (1989–1997)
- SNP chief whip (1978–1979)
- SNP deputy chief whip (1976–1977)
- SNP spokesperson, agriculture (1976–1979)
- SNP spokesperson, self-employed and small businesses (1975–1979)
- SNP spokesperson, local government (1974–1978)
- SNP spokesperson, housing (1974–1978)

== Honours and awards ==
In May 2012, Welsh became a freeman of the County of Angus. In January 2013, he was announced as a deputy lieutenant for Angus.

== Personal life and death ==
He married Sheena in 1971 and they had a daughter. They lived in Arbroath. He was a linguist and spoke French, Spanish and Chinese.

Since the mid 1980s, Welsh was an elder of the Church of Scotland in Arbroath, at Arbroath: St Andrew's Church.

Welsh died on 17 June 2021 in Arbroath at the age of 77.

Parliament of the United Kingdom
| Preceded by Jock Bruce-Gardyne | Member of Parliament for South Angus; October 1974 – 1979 | Succeeded by Peter Fraser |
| Preceded by Peter Fraser | Member of Parliament for East Angus; 1987–1997 | Constituency abolished |
| New constituency | Member of Parliament for Angus; 1997–2001 | Succeeded by Michael Weir |
Scottish Parliament
| New parliament Scotland Act 1998 | Member of the Scottish Parliament for Angus; 1999–2011 | Constituency abolished |
