= John George Jenkins =

Scottish farmers leader, TV presenter and Liberal Party politician

John George Jenkins CBE (26 August 1919 – 19 July 2007) was a Scottish farmers leader, TV presenter and a Liberal Party politician.

== Background ==
He was the son of George John Jenkins, OBE, FRCS and Alice Maud Jenkins, MBE. He was educated at Winchester College and Edinburgh University. In 1948 he married Chloe Kenward. They had one son and three daughters. In 1971 he was appointed a CBE.

== Professional career ==
From 1939 he farmed in Annan, Dumfriesshire. He was a director of agricultural companies and of the Dumfriesshire Cattle Breeders' Association. He was Director SW Farmers Co-operative Trading society Ltd. He was Director of first Artificial Insemination Centre in Scotland. In 1957 he expanded his farming interests to Cambridgeshire, becoming Director of Childerley Estates Ltd. In 1968 he became Director of Agricultural Mortgage Corporation Ltd. In 1963 he became Compère of the Anglia Television programme 'Farming Diary'. In 1984 he became Chairman of United Oilseeds Ltd.

== Political career ==
Jenkins was chairman of the Dumfriesshire branch of the National Farmers Union of Scotland. He was a Member of the Area Executive Committee of the NFU of Scotland. He was an executive committee member of the Scottish Association of Young Farmers' Clubs. In April 1949 he was selected as Liberal prospective parliamentary candidate for the newly created Angus South division of Scotland for the 1950 General Election. The 1950 elections were difficult for Liberal candidates and Jenkins was only able to poll 20% of the vote;

General Election 1950: South Angus
Party	Candidate	Votes	%	±%
Unionist	James Alexander Duncan	19,324	53.9	N/A
Labour	Norman Hogg	9,176	25.6	N/A
Liberal	John George Jenkins	7,360	20.5	N/A
Majority		10,148	28.3	N/A
Turnout		35,860	82.0	N/A
Unionist win (new seat)				

He did not stand for Parliament again. From 1960-1961 he served as President of the NFU of Scotland. In 1967 he became Chairman of the Agricultural Marketing Development Executive Committee, serving for 6 years.
