= Cyril Hamnett, Baron Hamnett =

Cyril Hamnett, Baron Hamnett (20 May 1906 – 17 March 1980) was a British journalist and politician.

He was the son of James Henry Hamnett and was educated at Manchester Technical School. In 1950 and in the following year, he contested Knutsford unsuccessfully for Labour.

On 6 July 1970, for his services to the Cooperative movement, he was created a life peer with the title Baron Hamnett, of Warrington, in the County Palatine of Lancaster.
