= Roger Makins, 1st Baron Sherfield =

British diplomat (1904–1996)

The Right Honourable The Lord Sherfield GCB GCMG FRS DL
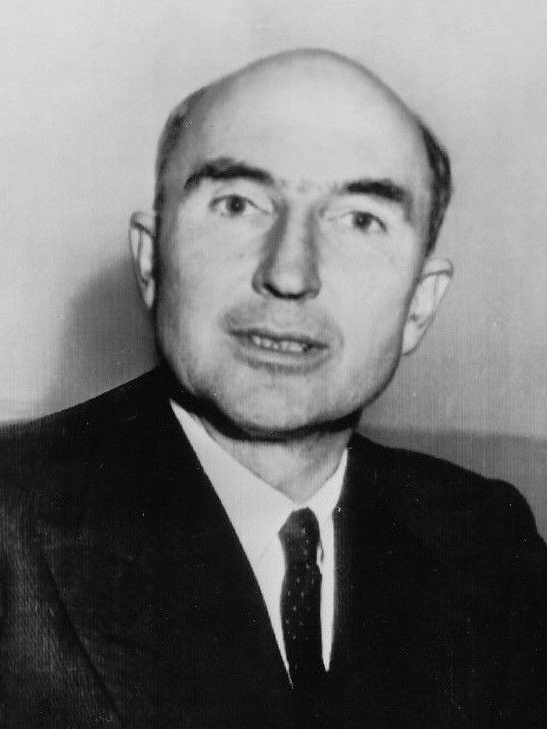
- Makins in 1952

British Ambassador to the United States
- In office 1953–1956
- Monarch: Elizabeth II
- Preceded by: Sir Oliver Franks
- Succeeded by: Sir Harold Caccia

Personal details
- Born: 3 February 1904
- Died: 9 November 1996 (aged 92)
- Education: Winchester College; Christ Church, Oxford

Roger Mellor Makins, 1st Baron Sherfield, GCB GCMG FRS DL (3 February 1904 – 9 November 1996), was a British diplomat who served as British Ambassador to the United States from 1953 to 1956.

== Background and early life ==
Makins was the son of Brigadier-General Sir Ernest Makins (1869–1959) and Florence Mellor. He was educated at Winchester College and Christ Church, Oxford, and was called to the Bar, Inner Temple, in 1927.

== Early diplomatic career ==
However, he never practised and instead joined the Diplomatic Service in 1928. In 1938 Makins minuted a Foreign Office memorandum dealing with the German refugee problem thus: "The pitiful condition to which German jews will be reduced will not make them desirable immigrants". He was later appointed to be Minister Plenipotentiary at the British Embassy in Washington in 1945, and served until 1947. He was Assistant Under-Secretary of State at the Foreign Office from 1947 to 1948 and as Deputy Under-Secretary of State from 1948 to 1952.

== Ambassador to the United States ==
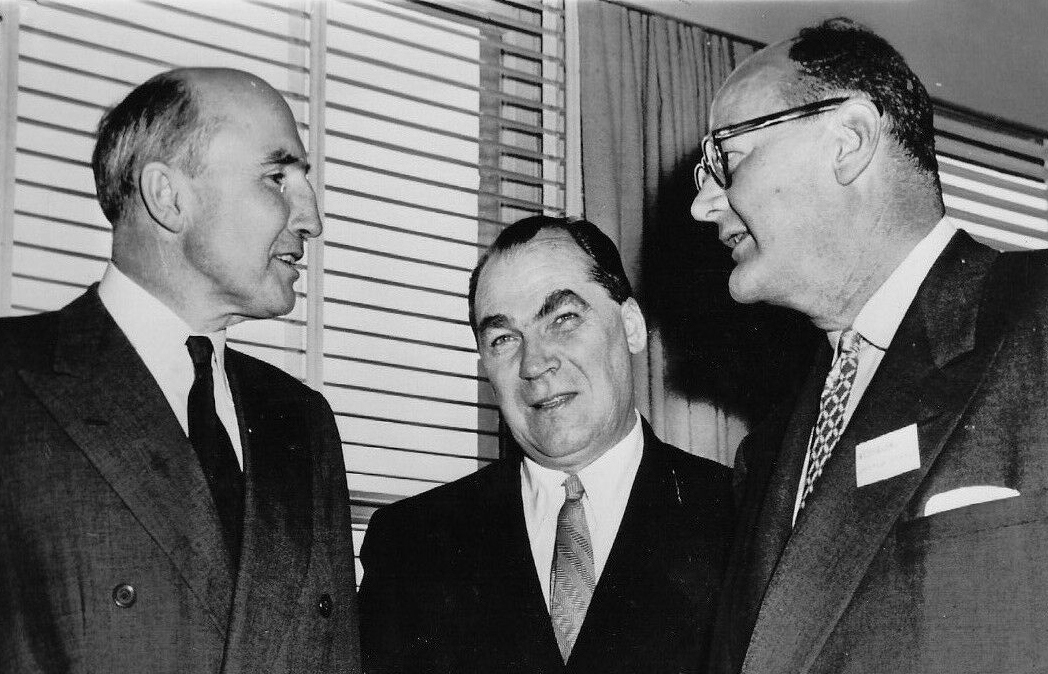
Makins (left) with the Soviet ambassador Zarubin and U.S. diplomat Wadsworth in Washington in 1956

In 1953 he was appointed to be the Ambassador to the United States, a post he held until 1956. On the eve of the Suez Crisis, he was present at the crucial meeting on 25 September 1956 where Harold Macmillan was apparently persuaded that US President Dwight D. Eisenhower had offered the British Government tacit support; Makins, on the other hand, correctly concluded that Eisenhower would not support the intervention.

== Later career in the civil service ==
After his return from Washington he served as Joint Permanent Secretary to The Treasury from 1956 to 1960 and as Chairman of the United Kingdom Atomic Energy Authority from 1960 to 1964.

== Chancellorship ==
Makins was appointed to the post of Chancellor of the University of Reading in 1969, and retained this position until 1992.

== Marriage and children ==
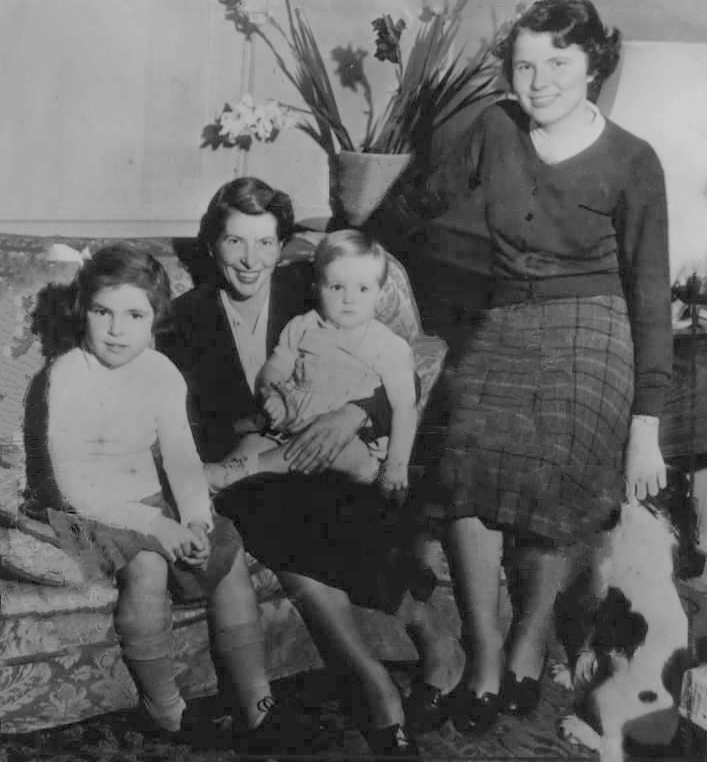
Alice Davis with three of her six children in 1952: Cynthia (17 years old, right, one of twins), Patricia (6 years old, left), and Dwight (18 months).

On 30 April 1934, in an Episcopal ceremony in Tallahassee, Florida, he married an American, Alice Brooks Davis (d. 1985), the daughter of Dwight F. Davis, founder of the Davis Cup and former US Secretary of War. The couple had six children:

- Mary Makins (b. 1935, twin). Married firstly, as his second wife, Hugo John Laurence Philipps, later 3rd Baron Milford, with whom she had four children. Married secondly, as his second wife, John Julius Cooper, 2nd Viscount Norwich, without issue;
- Cynthia Makins (b. 1935, twin). Married Oliver James Colman, with whom she had two children;
- Virginia Makins (b. 1939). Married David Michael Shapiro, with whom she had three sons;
- Christopher James Makins, 2nd Baron Sherfield (b. 1942 - d. 2006). Married Wendy Whitney Cortesi, daughter of John Sargent Whitney of Evergreen, Colorado, with whom he had a daughter;
- Patricia Makins (b. 1946). Married, firstly, Michael Ordway Miller, without issue, married, secondly, Loring Sagan, with whom she had two children;
- Dwight William Makins, 3rd Baron Sherfield (b. 1951). Married firstly Penelope Jane Collier, daughter of Donald R. L. Massy Collier. Married secondly Jenny Rolls.

== Honours ==
Makins was appointed to the Order of St Michael and St George as a Companion (CMG) in the 1944 New Year Honours and was promoted in the same Order as a Knight Commander (KCMG) in the 1949 Birthday Honours. He was appointed to the Order of the Bath as a Knight Commander (KCB) in the 1953 New Year Honours. He was promoted in the Order of St Michael and St George as a Knight Grand Cross (GCMG) in the 1955 New Year Honours and was promoted within the Order of the Bath as a Knight Grand Cross (GCB) in the 1960 New Year Honours.

In the 1964 Birthday Honours, Makins was raised to the peerage as Baron Sherfield, of Sherfield-on-Loddon in the County of Southampton.

He was elected to be a Fellow of the Royal Society (FRS) under Statute 12 (for those "who have rendered conspicuous service to the cause of science, or are such that election would be of signal benefit to the Society") in 1986.

== Arms ==
Coat of arms of Roger Makins, 1st Baron Sherfield
Crest A Dexter Arm embowed in Armour proper encircled by an annulet Or and holding a Flagstaff therefrom flowing a Banner Argent charged with a Lion's Face Gules Escutcheon Argent on a Fess embattled counter embattled Gules between in chief two Falcons proper belled Or and in base a Lion's Face of the second an Annulet Or between two Bezants Supporters Dexter: a Lion Sable pendent from a Chain about the neck Or a Bezant charged with a Model representing an Atom of Lithium 6 Sable; Sinister: a Bald Headed Eagle rising proper adorned likewise about the neck the Bezant charged with a Lawn Tennis Racquet erect gules Motto In Lumine Luce

== The Makins Collection ==
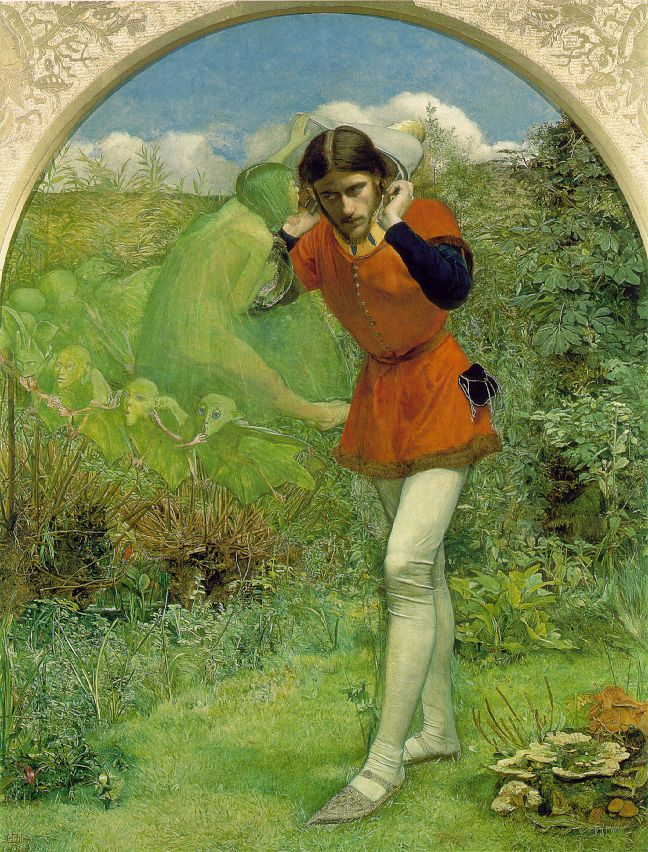
Ferdinand Lured by Ariel, a Millais from Makins's collection.

Makins was a notable collector of Victorian art. The Makins Collection contained important works by John Everett Millais.

Diplomatic posts
Preceded by Sir Oliver Franks	British Ambassador to the United States; 1953–1956	Succeeded by Sir Harold Caccia
Peerage of the United Kingdom
New creation	Baron Sherfield; 1964–1996	Succeeded by Christopher James Makins
Academic offices
Preceded by The Lord Bridges	Chancellor of the University of Reading; 1970–1992	Succeeded by The Lord Carrington
