= Lord Egerton Castle =

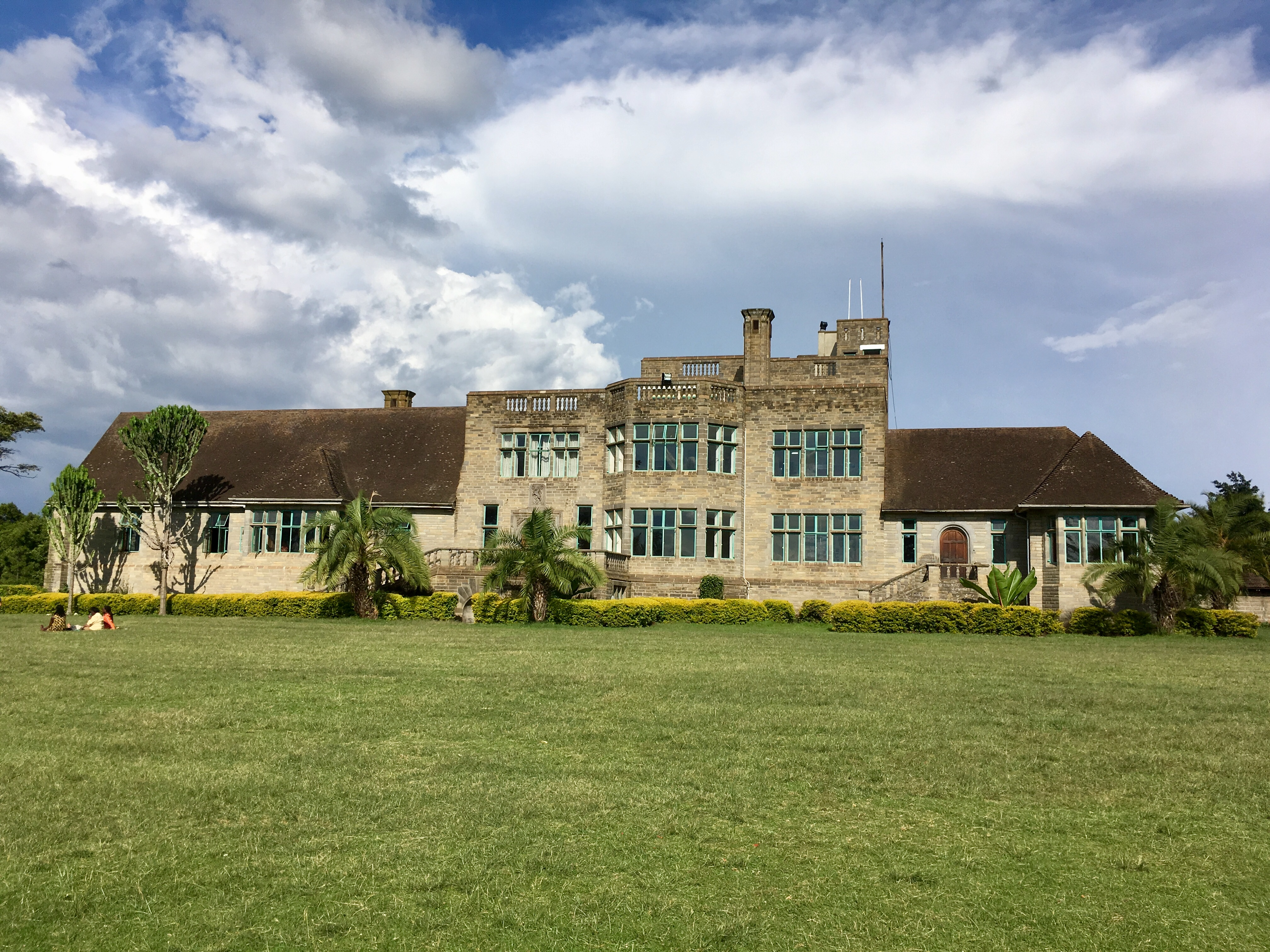

- Location within Kenya

General information
- Status: Completed
- Type: Castle
- Architectural style: Colonial
- Location: Nakuru, Kenya
- Coordinates: 0.2749°S 35.9722°E
- Named for: Maurice Egerton, 4th Baron Egerton
- Owner: Egerton University

Technical details
- Grounds: 100 acres (0.40 km^{2})

Website
- www.egerton.ac.ke/places-of-interest

Lord Egerton Castle is a house styled like a fortress located 14 km outside Nakuru, Kenya. The foundation was laid in 1938 by Maurice Egerton, 4th Baron Egerton. The architect was Albert Brown. Construction continued until 1954. In 1996 the Castle was declared a monument under Kenyan "The Antiquities and Monuments Act" (Gazetted in April 1996).

The castle was opened to the public in 2005 and is under management from Egerton University.

The castle has 52 rooms, which includes:

- dance hall with electric organ
- dark chamber for developing photos
- entrance hall
- master bedrooms
- study rooms
- wine cellar

== Location ==
Lord Egerton Castle is located off Nakuru- Kisumu highway in Nakuru, Kenya.

== Description ==
The foundation of castle was laid in 1938 by Maurice Egerton, 4th Baron Egerton. It is found in a serene environment with swelling hills and rolling scrubs in the background hence its architecture rises above the landscape. Its construction in 1952 came through a reality that the purpose for which it was built has fizzled out

== History ==
After purchasing the land Maurice Egerton built a small first house. While living in the first house the second house with four bedrooms was built. During this period Lord Egerton was courting a blond English lady by name Victoria and was keen to settle with her. The lady however turned down his proposal on account of what she referred to as a dwelling not befitting of her taste and standard. She would even refer to the house as a “chicken coop”. This prompted Maurice Egerton to construct the imposing castle in 1938 supposedly to impress the lady, who for the second time turned down his marriage offer. With the interruption of the Second World War the construction went on for sixteen years with its completion in 1954. Upon refusing to marry Lord Egerton, Victoria took off immediately to England. With this humiliation, a distraught and angry Lord Egerton made a monumental resolution: never to engage women in his life and never to marry. No woman was to be allowed into his home for whatever reason. His friends and farm workers were compelled to leave their wives or girl friends at the gate whenever they wanted to see Lord Egerton. In his will Lord Egerton stated that the Egerton Agricultural College he had founded was to be a male only institution and his wishes were granted for several years until the government of Kenya under pressure of lack of educational facilities directed admission of women into the college and subsequently expanded the institution to present day Egerton University. Intentionally and as per his wishes the authorities retained his name: naming the college and its expansive estate after Egerton. Lord Egerton stayed in the castle for only four years until his death in 1958 aged 83 years. In his death bed Lord Egerton was attended by a total of eighty medical personnel and care givers largely drawn from Britain. The castle has received legions of visitors who marvel at this vestige of colonial opulence.

== Gallery ==
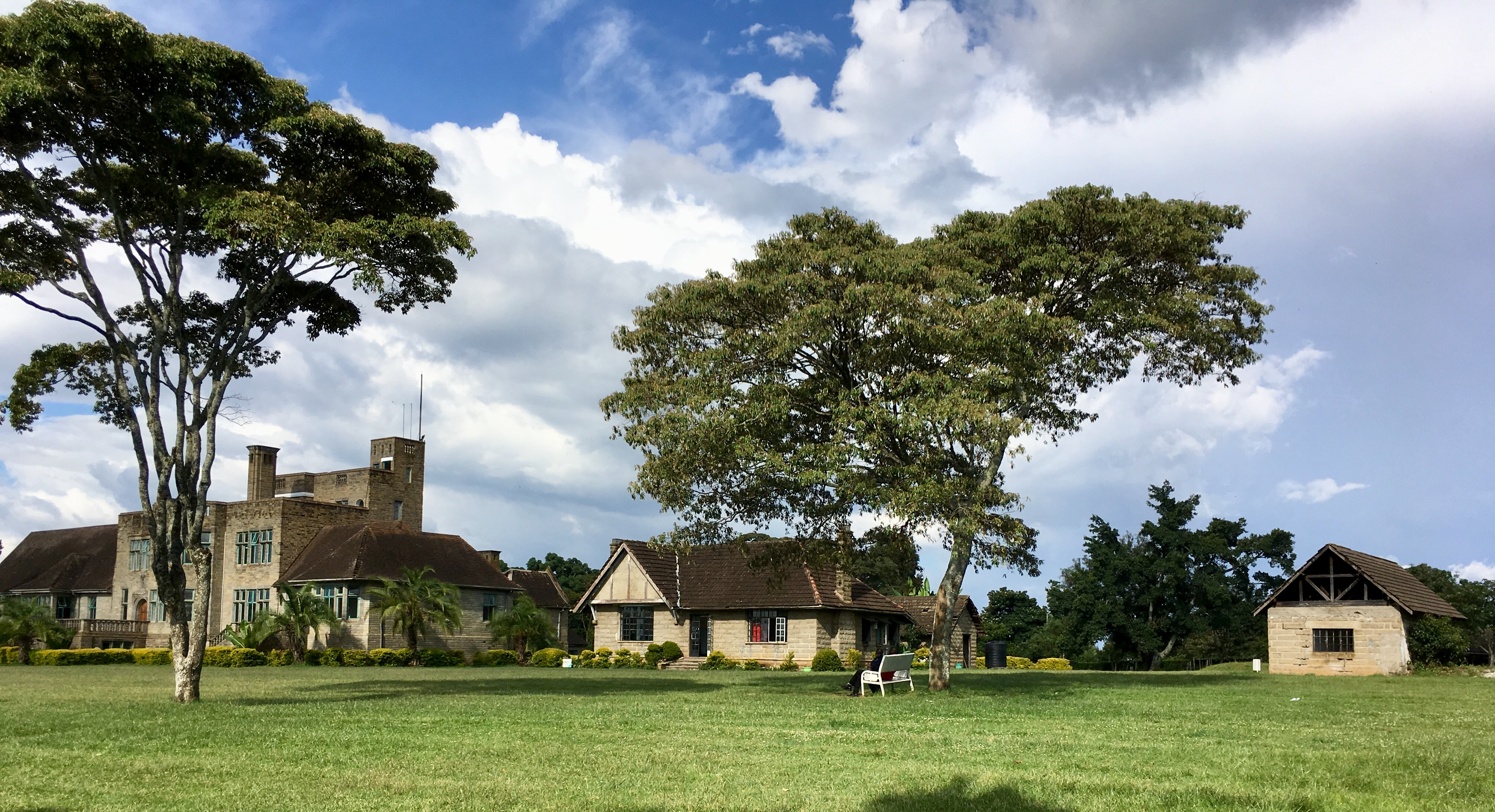
Lord Egerton Castle (left) with the first house (right) and second house (center)

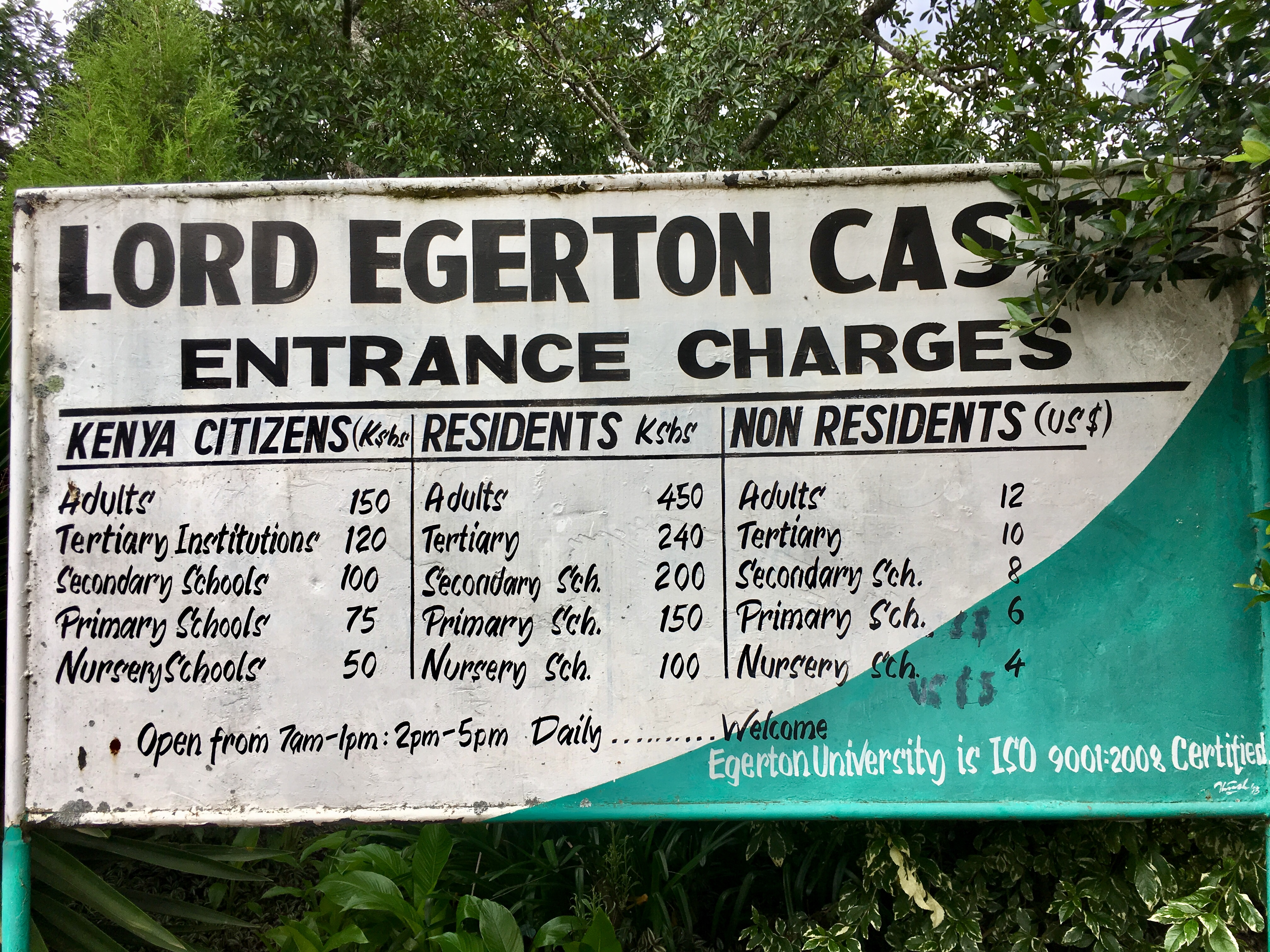
Lord Egerton Castle fees and opening hours

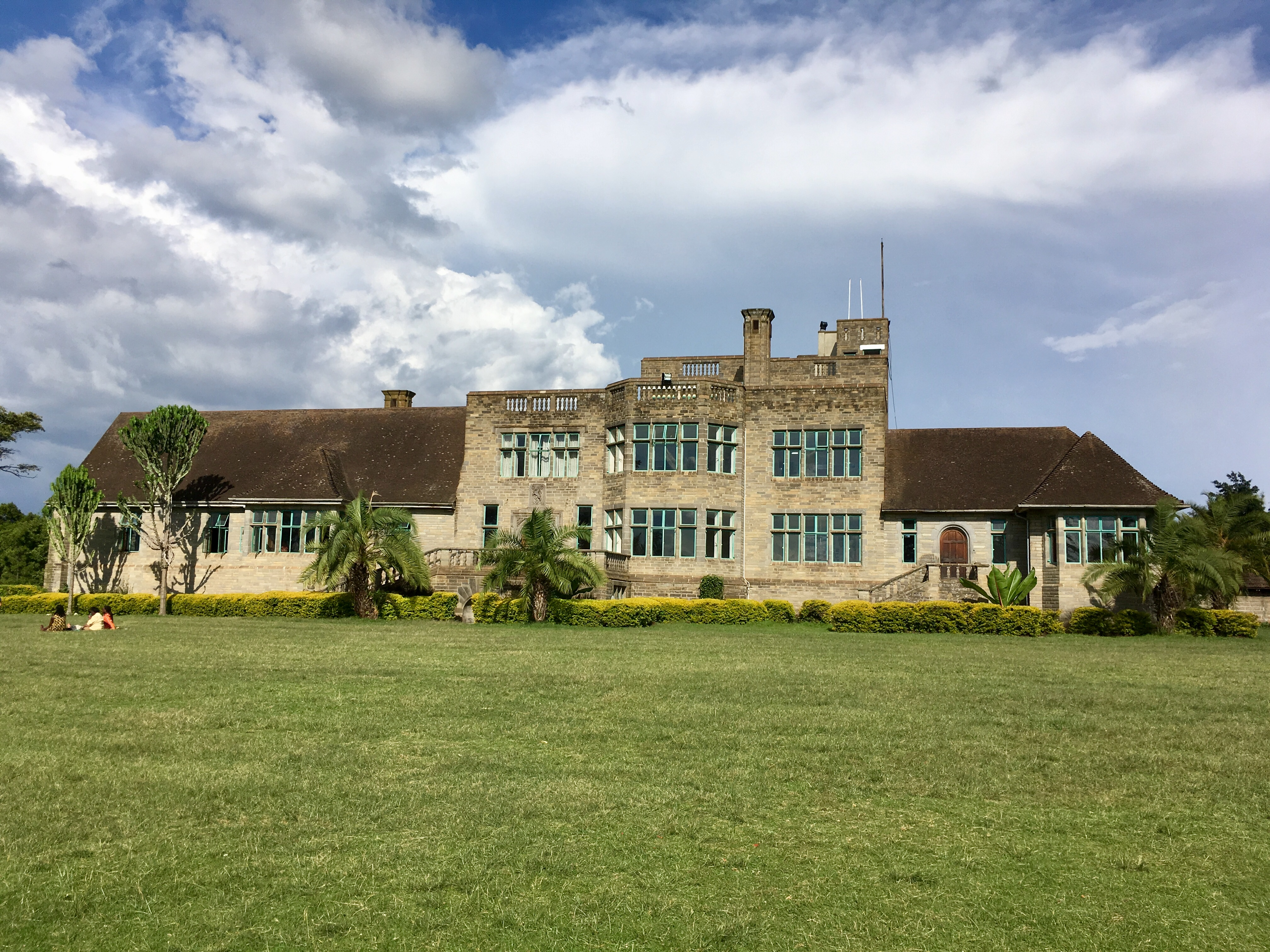
Lord Egerton Castle front view

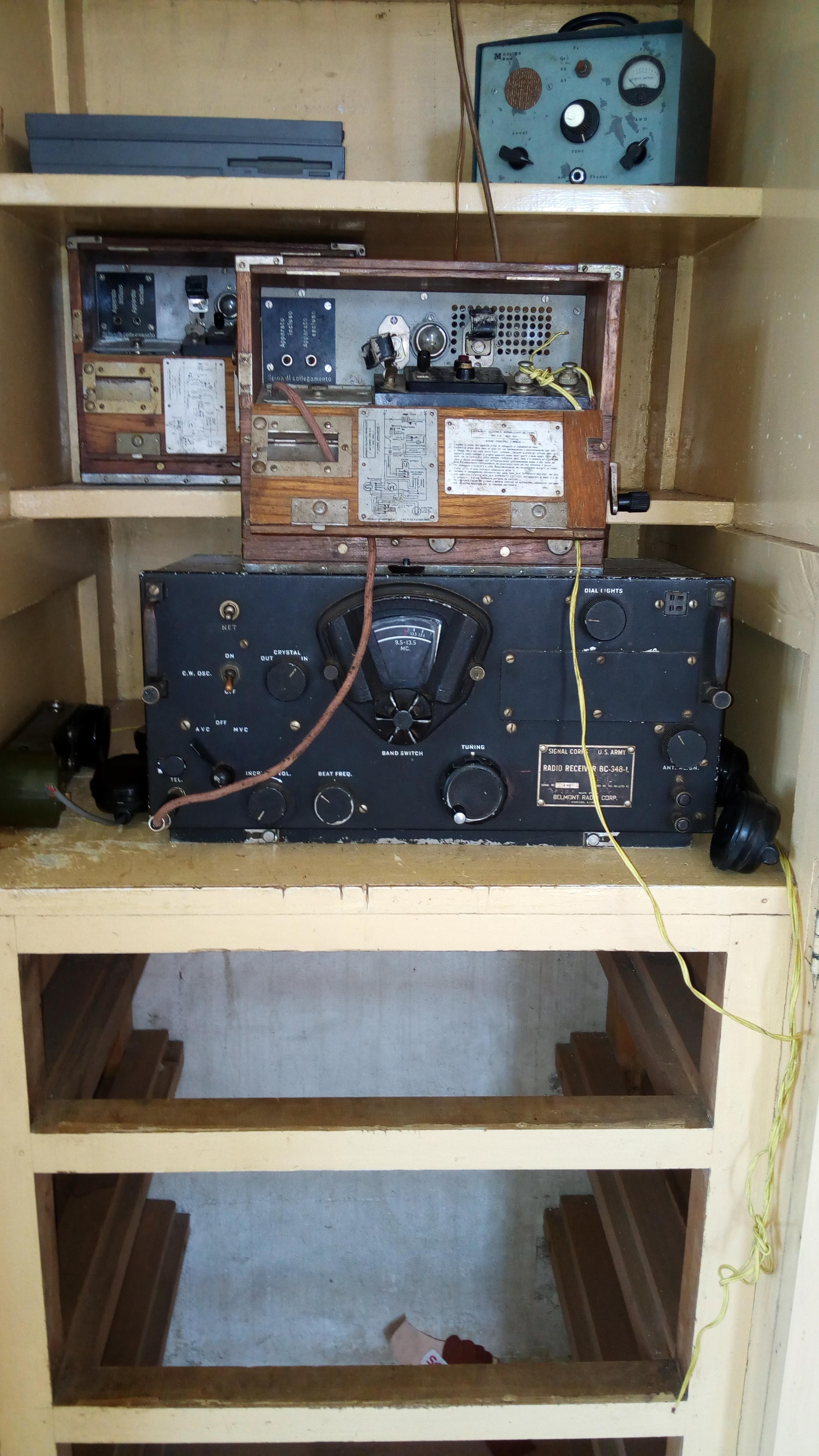
Old telephone from the Lord Egerton era.
