= Walter Bromley-Davenport =

British politician

Lieutenant-Colonel Sir Walter Henry Bromley-Davenport TD DL

Member of Parliament for Knutsford
- In office 1945–1970
- Preceded by: Ernest Makins
- Succeeded by: John Davies

Personal details
- Born: 15 September 1903
- Died: 26 December 1989 (aged 86) Capesthorne Hall, England
- Party: Conservative
- Spouse: Lenette Jeanes (m. 1933; died 1989)
- Relations: Bromley-Davenport family
- Children: 2
- Education: Malvern College
- Nickname: "Brommers"

Military service
- Allegiance: United Kingdom
- Branch/service: British Army
- Years of service: 1922-1937; 1939-1945
- Rank: Lieutenant-Colonel
- Unit: Grenadier Guards; Cheshire Regiment
- Commands: 5th Battalion of the Cheshire Regiment
- Battles/wars: World War II
- Awards: Territorial Decoration

Lieutenant-Colonel Sir Walter Henry Bromley-Davenport TD DL (15 September 1903 – 26 December 1989) was a British Conservative Party politician.

== Early years ==
Bromley-Davenport is one of the four sons of Walter Arthur Bromley-Davenport (28 September 1863 – 5 November 1942) of Capesthorne Hall, Macclesfield, Cheshire, and Lilian Emily Isabel (9 December 1878 – 2 May 1972), daughter of Lieutenant-Colonel John Henry Bagot Lane, late Coldstream Guards, head of a landed gentry family of Kings Bromley, Staffordshire, grandson of William Bagot, 2nd Baron Bagot, and great-grandson of the politician George Legge, 3rd Earl of Dartmouth. He was educated at Malvern College.

His mother, Lilian Bromley-Davenport, was heavily involved in local public life; she was an alderman and magistrate for Cheshire, president of the Macclesfield Conservative Association, chairman of the Cheshire County Education Committee, and a governor of several schools; she was created a Dame Commander of the Order of the British Empire in 1954.

== Military ==
He joined the Grenadier Guards in 1922. In 1926, he was the British Army welterweight boxing champion, a fact usually mentioned in his election literature during his subsequent political career. At the outbreak of World War II he raised the 5th Battalion of the Cheshire Regiment; he led the battalion during all of World War II.

== Political career ==
He was a Conservative Member of Parliament for Knutsford from 1945 until 1970, and was a Conservative junior Whip from 1948 to 1951. He lost his junior Whip position after kicking the Belgian ambassador down a flight of steps. He reportedly mistook the ambassador for a colleague who he thought had left the Commons before the 10 o'clock vote. His resignation resulted in the young future Prime Minister Edward Heath taking his place, beginning his ministerial career. He was a member of the British Boxing Board of Control from 1953. He was appointed Deputy Lieutenant of Cheshire in 1949 and knighted in 1961.

Bromley-Davenport had an extraordinarily loud voice. He would startle new Labour MPs when they rose to make a speech by screaming, "Take your hands out of your pockets!" On one occasion in 1956 he shouted 'Sit down!' at Otho Prior-Palmer, MP for Worthing, which the minister immediately did, as he attempted to speak at the same time as Davenport. When he entered an overcrowded train in Crewe, he walked up and down the corridor shouting, "All change!". When everyone left, he took a seat. He was also attacked by a man with an axe in his home. Davenport screamed, "Don't let the NHS get me!" and the assailant fled.

Many years later, Lord Weatherill, who later in his Parliamentary career had been Speaker of the House of Commons, but who was a whip during the time he shared in Parliament with Davenport, described him as "one of the greatest disrupters of Parliament I have ever heard. The honourable Member for Bolsover (Dennis Skinner) would not hold a candle to him these days."

== Family ==
Sir Walter Henry Bromley-Davenport married Lenette Jeanes in 1933; they had a son and a daughter.

Walter Henry Bromley-Davenport died at Capesthorne Hall on 26 December 1989, aged 86. His wife, Lenette, died a few days before him.

Parliament of the United Kingdom
Preceded by Sir Ernest Makins	Member of Parliament for Knutsford; 1945–1970	Succeeded by John Davies
