= East Angus (constituency) =

UK Parliament constituency (1983–1997)

Angus East
- Former county constituency for the House of Commons
- Subdivisions of Scotland: Angus

1983–1997
- Seats: One
- Created from: North Angus & Mearns; South Angus
- Replaced by: Angus, Tayside North, Dundee East, Dundee West

Angus East was a Scottish county constituency represented in the House of Commons of the Parliament of the United Kingdom from 1983 until 1997, when it was replaced largely by Angus with smaller proportions moving to Tayside North, Dundee East and Dundee West. Between 1950 and 1983, the area had been represented by the North Angus & Mearns and South Angus constituencies.

It elected one Member of Parliament (MP), using the first-past-the-post voting system.

== Boundaries ==
The Angus District electoral divisions of Aberbrothock, Arbroath Elliot, Arbroath St Vigeans, Brechin, Carnoustie, Eastern Glens, Montrose Lunan, and Montrose Northesk, and the City of Dundee District electoral divisions of Monifieth and Sidlaw.

== Members of Parliament ==
Election	Member	Party
1983	Peter Fraser	Conservative
1987	Andrew Welsh	SNP
1997	constituency abolished	

== Elections ==
=== Elections in the 1980s ===
General election 1983: Angus East
Party	Candidate	Votes	%	±%
Conservative	Peter Fraser	19,218	44.1	−1.0
SNP	Andrew Welsh	15,691	36.0	+4.9
SDP	Pauline Hammond	4,978	11.4	+3.4
Labour	Charles McConnell	3,497	8.0	−7.8
Ecology	Pamela Ross	239	0.6	New
Majority		3,527	8.1	−5.9
Turnout		43,623	73.5	
Conservative win (new seat)				

General election 1987: Angus East
Party	Candidate	Votes	%	±%
SNP	Andrew Welsh	19,536	42.4	+6.4
Conservative	Peter Fraser	17,992	39.0	−5.1
Labour	Raymond Mennie	4,971	10.8	+2.8
SDP	Ian Mortimer	3,592	7.8	−3.6
Majority		1,544	3.4	N/A
Turnout		46,091	75.5	+2.0
SNP gain from Conservative		Swing	+5.8	

=== Elections in the 1990s ===
General election 1992: Angus East
Party	Candidate	Votes	%	±%
SNP	Andrew Welsh	19,006	40.1	−2.3
Conservative	Ronald Harris	18,052	38.1	−0.9
Labour	Donald Taylor	5,994	12.6	+1.8
Liberal Democrats	Callum McLeod	3,897	8.2	+0.4
Green	Duncan McCabe	449	0.9	New
Majority		954	2.0	−1.4
Turnout		47,398	75.0	−0.5
SNP hold		Swing	−0.7	
