= Alfred Josoa =

Malagasy politician

Alfred Josoa (born November 16, 1943, in Antsohihy) is a Malagasy politician. He is a member of the Senate of Madagascar for Sofia Region, and is a member of the Tiako i Madagasikara party.
