= Alfred Lecerf =

Belgian politician (1948–2019)

Alfred Lecerf (4 October 1948 in Eupen – 7 February 2019 in Eupen) was a politician of the German-speaking Community of Belgium. He was a member of the Christian Social Party (CSP).

Lecerf has been a member of the municipal council of Lontzen from 1976 to 2018. He has also been mayor of Lontzen since 1994 to 2018.

From 1978 till 1981 he was a member of the Parliament of the German-speaking Community.
