= Alfred C. Markley =

American brigadier general (1843–1926)

Alfred Collins Markley
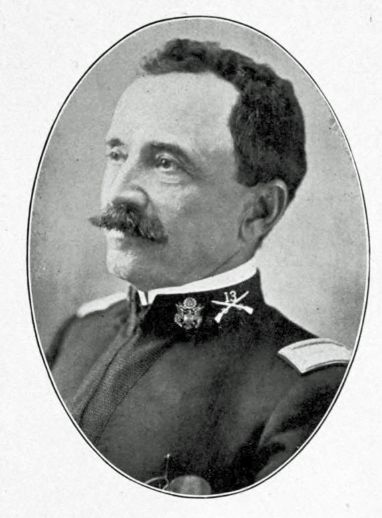
- Born: April 18, 1843; Doylestown, Pennsylvania, U.S.
- Died: August 25, 1926 (aged 83); Alton, Illinois, U.S.
- Spouse: Rebecca Conrad Morgan (m. 1868)
- Military career
- Branch: United States Army
- Service years: 1861–1907
- Rank: Brigadier General
- Units: 25th Pennsylvania Infantry Regiment; 52nd Pennsylvania Infantry Regiment
- Commands: 24th Infantry Regiment
- Conflicts: American Civil War: Siege of Petersburg; Appomattox campaign; American Indian Wars; Spanish–American War: Santiago campaign; Battle of San Juan Hill; Siege of Santiago

Alfred Collins Markley (1843–1926) was an American brigadier general who served in the American Civil War and the Spanish–American War. He was known for commanding the 24th Infantry Regiment during the Battle of San Juan Hill and the Siege of Santiago.

== American Civil War ==
Markley was born on April 18, 1843, at Doylestown, Pennsylvania as the son of John Sorver Markley and Eliza Collins. His family then moved to Philadelphia and Markley spent a majority of his childhood there, attending private and public schools within the city.

Markley enlisted in the Union Army on 1861 and was initially assigned to the 25th Pennsylvania Infantry Regiment before being made a corporal of the 52nd Pennsylvania Infantry Regiment from July 9, 1862, until September 1, 1863. He was then made a sergeant of Company K of the 197th Pennsylvania Infantry Regiment from July 11 to September 5, 1864. Markley was then promoted to second lieutenant of the 127th United States Colored Infantry Regiment on September 9, 1864.

Around this time, Markley served at the Siege of Petersburg and the Appomattox campaign. After being promoted to first lieutenant on March 5, 1865, he was honorably mustered out on October 20, 1865. Before that however, due to the ongoing Second French intervention in Mexico, Markley accompanied General Philip Sheridan's "Army of Observation" on the Rio Grande from May to October 1865.

== Indian Wars ==
Markley re-enlisted for service in the Regular Army on June 25, 1866, as a second lieutenant within the 41st Infantry Regiment. He was made an Adjutant from Christmas 1866 until June 14, 1867. He was promoted to first lieutenant on March 31, 1868, and also married Rebecca Conrad Morgan of Willow Grove on April 23, 1868. He was then transferred to the 24th Infantry Regiment on November 11, 1869, and was an active participant at the American Indian Wars from 1867 to 1880. He was promoted to captain on March 20, 1879, and to major of the 11th Infantry Regiment by April 26, 1895. From October to November 1881, he was given command of Fort Reno.

== Spanish–American War ==
On August 6, 1898, Markley was placed back in the 24th Infantry Regiment during the Spanish–American War. During the Battle of San Juan Hill, he was given command of the 24th Infantry Regiment after Lieutenant Colonel Emerson H. Liscum was wounded during the battle. He would serve a more major role at the Siege of Santiago as he continued to command the 24th Infantry Regiment as well as assisting with medical duties as he would work at the yellow fever camp at Siboney, treating those with the illness and burying the dead.

== Later service and years ==
After the war, he would serve at Fort D. A. Russell and at the Vancouver Barracks and was promoted to lieutenant colonel of 23rd Infantry Regiment on August 7, 1900. After the beginning of the Philippine–American War, Markley would be stationed at the Caraballo Mountains and assist with supply of American forces and was promoted to colonel on October 5, 1901 but returned to the American mainland in July 1902. He was initially stationed at Fort McDowell but went back to the Philippines on October 5, 1905, and was promoted to brigadier general on March 2, 1907, but he retired by his own request on June 9. It was recorded that Markley was living at Radnor, Pennsylvania. He died on August 25, 1926, at Alton, Illinois.

== Awards ==
- Indian Campaign Medal
- Philippine Campaign Medal
