= Knutsford (constituency) =

Parliamentary constituency in the United Kingdom, 1885–1983

- Former county constituency for the House of Commons
- Boundary of Knutsford in Cheshire, boundaries 1974–1983
- County: Cheshire

1885–1983
- Seats: one
- Created from: Mid Cheshire
- Replaced by: Tatton, Altrincham & Sale, Congleton and Davyhulme

Knutsford was a county constituency in Cheshire which returned one Member of Parliament (MP) to the House of Commons of the Parliament of the United Kingdom from 1885 until it was abolished for the 1983 general election.

== History ==
Knutsford was first created as one of eight single-member divisions of Cheshire under the Redistribution of Seats Act 1885.

It was abolished following the reorganisation of local authorities in 1974 by the Third Periodic Review of Westminster constituencies for the 1983 general election, when it was divided primarily between Altrincham and Sale and the new constituencies of Congleton and Tatton.

== Boundaries ==
1885–1918: The Sessional Division of Bucklow, parts of the Sessional Divisions of Daresbury, Prestbury, Leftwich, Northwich, and Stockport, and the part of the Borough of Warrington in the county of Cheshire.

The seat was centred around the town of Knutsford and stretched from Daresbury to the west, Disley to the east, and Holmes Chapel to the south.

1918–1945: The Urban Districts of Alderley Edge, Bollington, Hazel Grove and Bramhall, Knutsford, and Wilmslow, and parts of the Rural Districts of Bucklow, Congleton, Macclesfield, Northwich, and Runcorn.

Gained Hazel Grove from Hyde and Bramhall from Altrincham. Lost eastern fringe, including Disley, to Macclesfield.

1945–1950: The County Boroughs of Stockport (part) and Warrington (part)^{1}, the Urban Districts of Alderley Edge (part), Bollington, Hazel Grove and Bramhall, Knutsford, Marple (part)^{1} and Wilmslow, and parts of the Rural Districts of Bucklow, Congleton, Macclesfield, Northwich, Runcorn and Warrington^{1}.

^{1}Trivial parts of the electorate.

As part of an interim review of abnormally large constituencies (those exceeding an electorate of 100,000) in time for the 1945 election, the definition of the constituency's boundaries was altered to reflect changes in local authority boundaries. The only non-trivial adjustment to the electorate was to include the area comprising the former Urban District of Handforth, which had been absorbed into the Urban District of Wilmslow, transferred from the abolished Altrincham constituency.

1950–1955: The Urban Districts of Alderley Edge, Alsager, Bowdon, Hale, Knutsford, Sandbach and Wilmslow, and the Rural Districts of Bucklow and Congleton.

Major realignment of boundaries, losing eastern and western parts, whilst being extended to the north and south:

- Bollington and the part of the Rural District of Macclesfield, including Poynton, transferred to the constituency of Macclesfield;
- Hazel Grove and Bramhall included in the new constituency of Cheadle;
- Offerton (now part of the County Borough of Stockport) included in the new constituency of Stockport South;
- the parts of the Rural Districts of Northwich and Runcorn transferred to the respective constituencies of the same name;
- Alsager transferred from Crewe and Sandbach from Northwich, along with the parts of the Rural District of Congleton in both constituencies; and
- Bowdon, Hale and remaining parts of the Rural District of Bucklow transferred from the abolished constituency of Bucklow.

1955–1974: The Urban Districts of Alderley Edge, Bowdon, Hale, Knutsford, and Wilmslow, and the Rural Districts of Bucklow and Congleton.

Alsager and Sandbach transferred to Crewe.

1974–1983: The Urban Districts of Bowdon, Hale, and Knutsford, and the Rural Districts of Bucklow and Congleton.

Alderley Edge transferred to Macclesfield and Wilmslow to Cheadle.

From 1 April 1974 until the constituency was abolished at the next boundary review which came into effect for the 1983 general election, the constituency comprised parts of the newly formed Boroughs of Congleton, Macclesfield and Vale Royal in Cheshire, the City of Manchester (parish of Ringway) and the Borough of Trafford in Greater Manchester (Bowdon, Hale and the parishes of Carrington, Dunham Massey, Partington and Warburton), but its boundaries were unchanged.

On abolition, the constituency was broken up as follows:

- Bowdon and Hale, Dunham Massey and Warburton to Altrincham and Sale;
- Carrington and Warburton to the new constituency of Davyhulme;
- Ringway to Manchester Wythenshawe;
- southern parts, comprising the former Rural District of Congleton to the new constituency of Congleton; and
- remaining parts, including Knutsford and surrounding rural areas to the new constituency of Tatton.

== Members of Parliament ==
Election	Member	Party	Notes
1885	Alan Egerton	Conservative	
1906	Alfred John King	Liberal	
Jan 1910	Alan Sykes	Conservative	
1922	Ernest Makins	Conservative	
1945	Walter Bromley-Davenport	Conservative	
1970	John Davies	Conservative	Resigned November 1978
1979 by-election	Jock Bruce-Gardyne	Conservative	
1983	constituency abolished		

== Elections ==
=== Elections in the 1880s ===
Alan Egerton

General election 1885: Knutsford
Party	Candidate	Votes	%	±%
Conservative	Alan Egerton	4,663	57.7	
Liberal	John Barlow	3,419	42.3	
Majority		1,244	15.4	
Turnout		8,082	86.8	
Registered electors		9,314		
Conservative win (new seat)				

General election 1886: Knutsford
Party	Candidate	Votes	%	±%
Conservative	Alan Egerton	Unopposed		
Conservative hold				

=== Elections in the 1890s ===
General election 1892: Knutsford
Party	Candidate	Votes	%	±%
Conservative	Alan Egerton	4,754	63.0	N/A
Liberal	Alexander Mere Latham	2,792	37.0	New
Majority		1,962	26.0	N/A
Turnout		7,546	80.7	N/A
Registered electors		9,348		
Conservative hold		Swing	N/A	

General election 1895: Knutsford
Party	Candidate	Votes	%	±%
Conservative	Alan Egerton	Unopposed		
Conservative hold				

=== Elections in the 1900s ===
General election 1900: Knutsford
Party	Candidate	Votes	%	±%
Conservative	Alan Egerton	Unopposed		
Conservative hold				

Alfred John King

General election 1906: Knutsford
Party	Candidate	Votes	%	±%
Liberal	Alfred King	5,296	53.5	New
Conservative	Alan Egerton	4,596	46.5	N/A
Majority		700	7.0	N/A
Turnout		9,892	88.8	N/A
Registered electors		11,141		
Liberal gain from Conservative		Swing	N/A	

=== Elections in the 1910s ===
General election January 1910: Knutsford
Party	Candidate	Votes	%	±%
Conservative	Alan Sykes	6,199	54.9	+8.4
Liberal	Alfred King	5,084	45.1	−8.4
Majority		1,115	9.8	N/A
Turnout		11,283	92.9	+4.1
Conservative gain from Liberal		Swing		

General election December 1910: Knutsford
Party	Candidate	Votes	%	±%
Conservative	Alan Sykes	6,127	56.8	+1.9
Liberal	J.H. Whitworth	4,658	43.2	−1.9
Majority		1,469	13.6	+3.8
Turnout		10,785	88.8	−4.1
Conservative hold		Swing	+1.9	

General Election 1914–15:

Another General Election was required to take place before the end of 1915. The political parties had been making preparations for an election to take place and by July 1914, the following candidates had been selected;

- Unionist: Alan Sykes
- Liberal: Philip Oliver

General election 1918: Knutsford
Party		Candidate	Votes	%	±%
C	Unionist	Alan Sykes	Unopposed		
	Unionist hold				
C indicates candidate endorsed by the coalition government.

=== Elections in the 1920s ===
General election 1922: Knutsford
Party	Candidate	Votes	%	±%
Unionist	Ernest Makins	15,650	57.9	N/A
Liberal	Percy Butlin	11,388	42.1	New
Majority		4,262	15.8	N/A
Turnout		27,038	77.2	N/A
Unionist hold		Swing	N/A	

General election 1923: Knutsford
Party	Candidate	Votes	%	±%
Unionist	Ernest Makins	13,838	50.1	−7.8
Liberal	Arthur Stanley	13,758	49.9	+7.8
Majority		80	0.2	−15.6
Turnout		27,596	76.8	−1.4
Unionist hold		Swing	-7.8	

General election 1924: Knutsford
Party	Candidate	Votes	%	±%
Unionist	Ernest Makins	18,199	60.5	+10.4
Liberal	John Paul McDougall	11,885	39.5	−10.4
Majority		6,314	21.0	+20.8
Turnout		30,084	80.9	+4.1
Unionist hold		Swing	+10.4	

General election 1929: Knutsford
Party	Candidate	Votes	%	±%
Unionist	Ernest Makins	22,605	53.5	−7.0
Liberal	Arthur Jalland	19,629	46.5	+7.0
Majority		2,976	7.0	−14.0
Turnout		42,234	80.5	−0.4
Unionist hold		Swing	-7.0	

=== Elections in the 1930s ===
General election 1931: Knutsford
Party	Candidate	Votes	%	±%
Conservative	Ernest Makins	Unopposed		
Conservative hold				

General election 1935: Knutsford
Party	Candidate	Votes	%	±%
Conservative	Ernest Makins	30,252	63.7	N/A
Liberal	Harold Heathcote-Williams	17,253	36.3	New
Majority		12,999	27.4	N/A
Turnout		47,505	76.3	N/A
Conservative hold		Swing	N/A	

General Election 1939–40: Another General Election was required to take place before the end of 1940. The political parties had been making preparations for an election to take place and by the Autumn of 1939, the following candidates had been selected;

- Conservative: Ernest Makins
- Liberal: Harold Heathcote-Williams

=== Elections in the 1940s ===
General election 1945: Knutsford
Party	Candidate	Votes	%	±%
Conservative	Walter Bromley-Davenport	33,056	56.2	−7.5
Labour	Frederick Lockwood Tyler	14,416	24.5	New
Liberal	Lawrence Lauderdale Maitland	10,703	18.2	−18.1
Common Wealth	Frank William Young	628	1.1	New
Majority		18,640	31.7	+4.3
Turnout		58,175	77.1	+0.8
Conservative hold		Swing		

=== Elections in the 1950s ===
General election 1950: Knutsford
Party	Candidate	Votes	%	±%
Conservative	Walter Bromley-Davenport	29,707	59.17	
Labour	Cyril Hamnett	12,794	25.48	
Liberal	Lawrence Lauderdale Maitland	7,703	15.34	
Majority		16,913	33.69	
Turnout		50,204		
Conservative hold		Swing		

General election 1951: Knutsford
Party	Candidate	Votes	%	±%
Conservative	Walter Bromley-Davenport	34,114	69.97	
Labour	Cyril Hamnett	14,640	30.03	
Majority		19,474	39.94	
Turnout				
Conservative hold		Swing		

General election 1955: Knutsford
Party	Candidate	Votes	%	±%
Conservative	Walter Bromley-Davenport	29,074	75.20	
Labour	Cyril Hamnett	9,588	24.80	
Majority		19,486	50.40	
Turnout		38,662		
Conservative hold		Swing		

General election 1959: Knutsford
Party	Candidate	Votes	%	±%
Conservative	Walter Bromley-Davenport	27,270	62.9	−12.3
Liberal	Frank Tetlow	8,117	18.8	New
Labour	Norman Selwyn	7,945	18.3	−6.5
Majority		19,153	44.1	−6.3
Turnout		43,332	81.8	
Conservative hold		Swing		

=== Elections in the 1960s ===
General election 1964: Knutsford
Party	Candidate	Votes	%	±%
Conservative	Walter Bromley-Davenport	26,826	53.4	−9.5
Liberal	Michael J Hunkin	12,499	24.9	+6.1
Labour	David Dollimore	10,882	21.7	+3.4
Majority		14,327	28.5	−15.6
Turnout		50,207	80.34	−1.5
Conservative hold		Swing	-7.8	

General election 1966: Knutsford
Party	Candidate	Votes	%	±%
Conservative	Walter Bromley-Davenport	26,550	51.5	−1.9
Liberal	Geoff Tordoff	12,839	24.9	0.0
Labour	Keith J Hill	12,174	23.6	+1.9
Majority		13,711	26.6	−1.9
Turnout		51,563	79.1	−1.2
Conservative hold		Swing	-1.0	

=== Elections in the 1970s ===
General election 1970: Knutsford
Party	Candidate	Votes	%	±%
Conservative	John Davies	33,194	59.82	
Labour	Andrew Bennett	11,612	20.93	
Liberal	Geoff Tordoff	10,684	19.25	
Majority		21,582	38.89	
Turnout		55,490	74.75	
Conservative hold		Swing		

General election February 1974: Knutsford
Party	Candidate	Votes	%	±%
Conservative	John Davies	23,632	52.50	
Liberal	Brian M. Lomax	12,542	27.86	
Labour	Barry W. McColgan	8,840	19.64	
Majority		11,090	24.64	
Turnout		45,014		
Conservative hold		Swing		

General election October 1974: Knutsford
Party	Candidate	Votes	%	±%
Conservative	John Davies	21,636	51.02	
Liberal	Brian M. Lomax	11,210	26.43	
Labour	D.L. Swain	9,565	22.55	
Majority		10,426	24.59	
Turnout		42,411	76.8	
Conservative hold		Swing		

1979 Knutsford by-election
Party	Candidate	Votes	%	±%
Conservative	Jock Bruce-Gardyne	22,086	67.13	+16.11
Liberal	Robert Ingham	5,206	15.82	−10.61
Labour	Alan G Barton	5,124	15.57	−6.98
Ind. Conservative	Michael Byrne	486	1.48	New
Majority		16,880	51.31	+26.72
Turnout		32,902		
Conservative hold		Swing	+13.4	

General election 1979: Knutsford
Party	Candidate	Votes	%	±%
Conservative	Jock Bruce-Gardyne	26,795	59.58	+8.56
Labour	Alan G Barton	8,992	19.99	−2.56
Liberal	Robert Ingham	8,499	18.90	−7.53
Ind. Conservative	J Brown	690	1.53	N/A
Majority		17,803	39.59	+15.00
Turnout		44,976		
Conservative hold		Swing		

== See also ==
- History of parliamentary constituencies and boundaries in Cheshire
