= Ernest Makins =

British military officer, statesman and Conservative Party politician

Brigadier-General Sir Ernest Makins KBE CB DSO
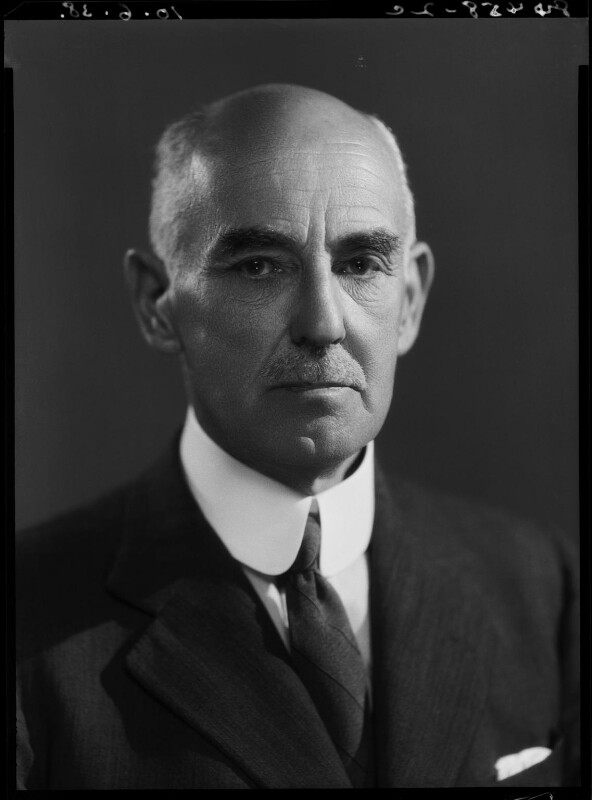
- Makins in 1938
- Born: 14 October 1869
- Died: 18 May 1959 (aged 89)
- Military career
- Allegiance: United Kingdom
- Branch: British Army
- Service years: 1892–1946
- Rank: Brigadier-General
- Unit: 1st (Royal) Dragoons
- Commands: 6th Cavalry Brigade
- Conflicts: Second Boer War; First World War
- Awards: Knight Commander of the Order of the British Empire; Companion of the Order of the Bath; Distinguished Service Order

Member of Parliament for Knutsford
- In office 15 November 1922 – 15 June 1945
- Preceded by: Alan Sykes
- Succeeded by: Walter Bromley-Davenport

Brigadier-General Sir Ernest Makins, KBE, CB, DSO (14 October 1869 – 18 May 1959) was a British Army officer and Conservative Party politician.

== Military career ==
Makins was the eldest son of Henry F. Makins. He was commissioned a second lieutenant in the 1st (Royal) Dragoons on 23 January 1892, was promoted to lieutenant on 31 August 1893, and to captain on 2 February 1898.

He fought in the Second Boer War between 1899 and 1902, where he took part in the Relief of Ladysmith, including the battles of Colenso (15 December 1899), Spion Kop (20–24 January 1900), Vaal Krantz (5–7 February 1900), and the Tugela Heights and Pieter's Hill (14–27 February 1900). In the following months he took part in operations in Natal March to June, and in the Orange River Colony until November 1900. He was mentioned in despatches on 10 September 1901, and appointed a Companion of the Distinguished Service Order (DSO) for his service during the war. After peace was declared in May 1902, Makins left South Africa on board the SS Bavarian and arrived in the United Kingdom the following month. He was promoted to major on 3 September 1902, and received the insignia of the DSO from King Edward VII following troop inspections on 4 November 1902.

Makins, who in February 1910 was promoted to lieutenant colonel, and June 1913 to colonel, fought in the First World War, where he was also mentioned in despatches. He was appointed commander of the 6th Cavalry Brigade in September 1914. On 11 May 1915 he was promoted to temporary brigadier general and succeeded Charles James Briggs as commander of the 1st Cavalry Brigade.

He was colonel of the 1st Royal Dragoons between 1931 and 1946.

== Honours ==
- Distinguished Service Order (DSO; 1902)
- Companion, Order of the Bath (CB; 1917)
- Knight Commander of the Order of the British Empire (KBE; 1938)

== Political career ==
He was elected at the 1922 general election as the Member of Parliament (MP) for the Knutsford division of Cheshire, and held the seat until he retired from the House of Commons at the 1945 general election.

== Family ==
Makins married at Christ Church, Lancaster Gate on 31 January 1903 to Maria Florence Mellor (ca. 1877 – 11 August 1972), third daughter of James R. Mellor, King′s Coroner and Master of the Crown Office. Their children were:

- Sir Roger Mellor Makins, 1st Baron Sherfield, KCMG (1904–1996)
- Guy Herbert Makins (5 July 1906 – 17 September 1923)
- Major Geoffrey Henry Makins (19 October 1915 – 4 September 1944)

One of Sir Ernest Makins' grandsons, by his eldest son, was Christopher J. Makins (1942—2006), a British-American diplomat

== Sources ==
- Becke, Archibald F. (1935). Order of Battle of Divisions Part 1–The Regular British Divisions. London: HMSO. OCLC 4405016.

Honorary titles
Preceded by Sir John Burn-Murdoch	Colonel of 1st The Royal Dragoons; 1931–1946	Succeeded by Francis Wilson-Fitzgerald
Parliament of the United Kingdom
Preceded by Sir Alan John Sykes, Bt	Member of Parliament for Knutsford; 1922 – 1945	Succeeded by Walter Bromley-Davenport
