= Alfred Buckham =

British photographer

Alfred George Buckham
- Born: 6 November 1879; London, England
- Died: 21 September 1956 (aged 76)
- Occupation: aerial photography

"Aerial View of Edinburgh" by Buckham, c. 1920

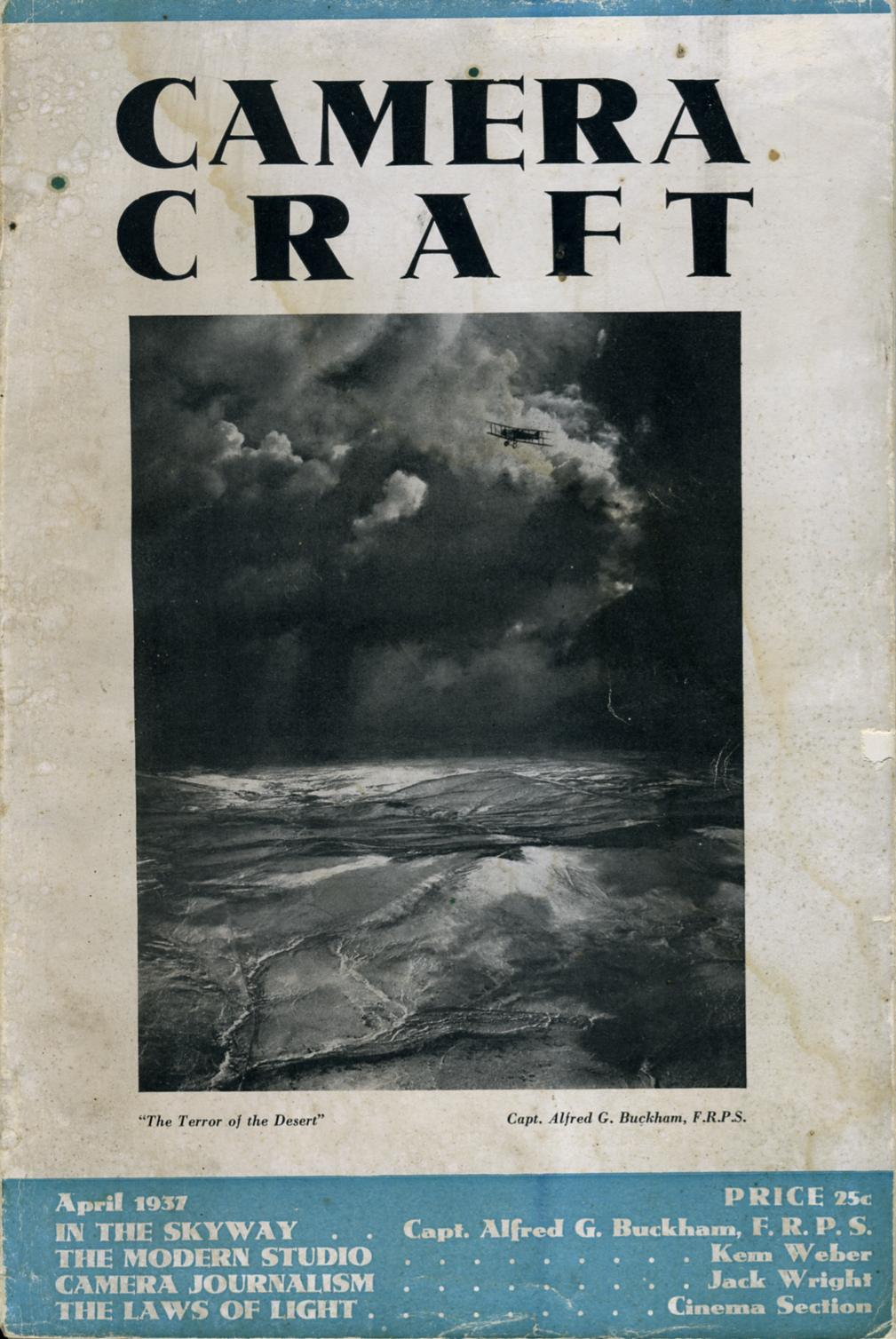
Camera Craft Magazine Cover April 1937. Cover photo "The Terror of the Desert" by Buckham

Alfred George Buckham (6 November 1879 – 21 September 1956) was a British photographer who specialised in aerial photography.

== Career ==
Buckham was born in London in 1879. He began his career in photography in 1905 and joined the Royal Naval Air Service as a reconnaissance photographer in 1917. He became the first head of aerial reconnaissance for the Royal Navy in the First World War and later a captain in the Royal Naval Air Service.

Buckham was involved in nine crashes, eight of which saw him relatively unscathed. After the ninth, however, he had to have a laryngectomy and breathed through a small pipe in his neck for the rest of his life. Despite this, he carried on his aerial photography career, often in very perilous conditions. He felt the best shots were made standing up, writing "If one's right leg is tied to the seat with a scarf or a piece of rope, it is possible to work in perfect security". He was discharged at the end of 1918 as one hundred per cent disabled and was described as being 'unable to speak'.

He joined the Royal Photographic Society in 1913 and gained his Fellowship the same year. and published in the Society's Photographic Journal. He was also a member of a number of a number of other photography organisations including the Borough Polytechnic Photographic Society where he was secretary and also lectured on photography and the Society of Night Photographers and participated in its exhibition of 1912. He was also active in the RPS's Affiliation scheme for photographic societies and was elected as an executive committee member in 1911.

During his lifetime he also exhibited his work widely in photographic society exhibitions including that of the Royal Photographic Society. He also exhibited his aerial photographs at the Camera Club in 1929. His photography was shown in an exhibition of aerial photographs held by Rice and Harper Ltd in their Armstrong-Siddeley showrooms in Guildford in 1934.

Buckham spoke at the National Smoke Abatement Society in 1935 where he discussed the effect of smoke on aviation and its impact on his aerial photography.

== Legacy ==
Buckham's photography is held in various collections including the Scottish National Portrait Gallery, the Royal Photographic Society Collection, and others. His work has been widely exhibited, including in the Royal Photographic Society exhibition Photogenic and the Scottish National Portrait Gallery's The Fine Art of Photography in 2002. Buckham will be the subject of a solo exhibition, "Alfred Buckham - Daredevil Photographer," until April 19, 2026 at the Scottish NPG.

== Death ==
Buckham died in 1956, aged 76. He left a widow, Grace Marianne, and a son.

== Bibliography ==
- A Vision of Flight: The Aerial Photography of Alfred G. Buckham. Stroud, UK: The History Press, 2008. ISBN 978-0-7524-4430-7.
