= Alfred Douglas Hardy =

Australian botanist (1870-1958)

Alfred Douglas Hardy (1870 – 1958) was an Australian amateur collector of freshwater algae specimens.

He worked as a draftsman and botanical officer for the Victorian Forest Commission until his retirement in 1936. He was also an amateur naturalist, initially with wide interests but later specialising in freshwater algae. He sent many specimens to George Stephen West, some of which were described as new species by West. In 1909, West published a major paper on the freshwater algae of Yan Yean Reservoir, based entirely upon specimens collected by Hardy. One of the new species published therein was named Debarya hardyi in Hardy's honour. Also in 1909, the Melbourne & Metropolitan Board of Works appointed him "honorary algologist", a position that he held for the rest of his life. His position required him to provide reports listing the algae species found in the various reservoirs managed by the Board of Works. In addition to these unpublished reports, Hardy publishedat least 14 papers of the freshwater algae of Victoria, mostly in the Victorian Naturalist.
