= Alfred Solstad =

American politician (1884–1973)

Alfred Solstad (January 23, 1884 – March 20, 1973) was an American farmer, businessman, and politician.

Solstad was born on a farm in Bygland Township, Polk County, Minnesota. He lived in Fisher, Minnesota, was a cattle farmer and was involved with the insurance business. Solstad served in the Minnesota Senate from 1935 to 1946. He died at Valley Memorial Home in Grand Forks, North Dakota.
