= Alfred John King =

Alfred John King

Alfred John King BSc, (14 February 1859 – 16 March 1920), was a British Liberal Party politician.

== Background ==
He was the 2nd son of Alderman John King, a former Mayor of Manchester. He was educated at Oliver's Mount School, Scarborough and Owens College, where he obtained a Bachelor of Science. He married in 1888, Julia Constance Oliver of Bollington. They had two sons and one daughter.

== Career ==
He worked as a Bleacher and finisher. He was Chairman of Bollington District Council from 1896 to 1906. He was a member of the Society of Friends. He sat as Liberal MP for the Knutsford Division of Cheshire from 1906 to 1910. He gained the seat from the Conservatives at the 1906 General Election. He lost the seat back to the Conservatives at the general election of January 1910. He did not stand for parliament again.

== Sources ==
- Who Was Who
- British parliamentary election results 1885–1918, Craig, F. W. S.

Parliament of the United Kingdom
Preceded by Alan Egerton	Member of Parliament for Knutsford; 1906–January 1910	Succeeded by Alan Sykes
