= Alf King =

Australian rules footballer

Personal information
- Full name: Alfred N. King
- Born: 25 September 1941 (age 85)
- Original teams: Melbourne Grammar, Brunswick Amateurs
- Height: 175 cm (5 ft 9 in)
- Weight: 78 kg (172 lb)
- Position: Half-forward

Playing career^{1}
Years	Club	Games (Goals)
1961–1962	Essendon	13 (6)
- ^{1} Playing statistics correct to the end of 1962.

Alfred N. King (born 25 September 1941) is a former Australian rules footballer who played for the Essendon Football Club in the Victorian Football League (VFL). He also played for the Carlton's reserves.
