= South Angus (UK Parliament constituency) =

Parliamentary constituency in the United Kingdom, 1950–1983

- Former county constituency for the House of Commons
- Subdivision: Forfarshire
- Major settlements: Arbroath, Carnoustie, Forfar and Monifieth

1950–1983
- Seats: One
- Created from: Forfarshire and Montrose Burghs
- Replaced by: East Angus and North Tayside

South Angus was a county constituency in Scotland, represented in the House of Commons of the Parliament of the United Kingdom from 1950 to 1983.

== Boundaries ==
The burghs of Arbroath, Carnoustie, Forfar, Kirriemuir, and Monifieth, and the districts of Carnoustie, Forfar, Kirriemuir, and Monifieth.

== Members of Parliament ==
Election	Member	Party
1950	James Duncan	Conservative and National Liberal
1964	Jock Bruce-Gardyne	Conservative
Oct 1974	Andrew Welsh	SNP
1979	Peter Fraser	Conservative
1983	constituency abolished: see Angus East & Tayside North	

== Election results ==
=== Elections of the 1950s ===
1950 general election: South Angus
Party	Candidate	Votes	%	±%
National Liberal	James Duncan	19,324	53.9	
Labour	Norman Hogg	9,176	25.6	
Liberal	John George Jenkins	7,360	20.5	
Majority		10,148	28.3	
Turnout		35,860	82.0	
National Liberal win (new seat)				

1951 general election: South Angus
Party	Candidate	Votes	%	±%
National Liberal	James Duncan	24,478	70.9	+17.0
Labour	James Harold	10,028	29.1	+3.5
Majority		14,450	41.8	+13.5
Turnout		34,506	76.6	−5.4
National Liberal hold		Swing		

1955 general election: South Angus
Party	Candidate	Votes	%	±%
National Liberal	James Duncan	23,967	72.7	+1.8
Labour	Harry Gourlay	8,996	27.3	−1.8
Majority		14,971	45.4	+3.6
Turnout		32,963	73.6	−3.0
National Liberal hold		Swing	+1.8	

1959 general election: South Angus
Party	Candidate	Votes	%	±%
National Liberal	James Duncan	19,435	57.1	−15.6
Liberal	George Mackie	8,139	23.9	N/A
Labour	James L. Stewart	6,477	19.0	−8.3
Majority		11,296	33.2	−12.2
Turnout		34,051	75.9	+2.3
National Liberal hold		Swing		

=== Elections of the 1960s ===
1964 general election: South Angus
Party	Candidate	Votes	%	±%
Unionist	Jock Bruce-Gardyne	19,566	58.2	+1.1
Labour Co-op	Dick Douglas	7,590	22.6	+3.6
Liberal	Christopher B. H. Scott	6,472	19.3	−4.6
Majority		11,976	35.6	+2.4
Turnout		33,628	75.6	−0.3
Unionist hold		Swing	−1.3	

1966 general election: South Angus
Party	Candidate	Votes	%	±%
Conservative	Jock Bruce-Gardyne	22,407	70.4	+12.2
Labour	Francis Cosgrove McManus	9,404	29.6	+7.0
Majority		13,003	40.8	+5.2
Turnout		31,811	71.2	−4.4
Conservative hold		Swing	+2.6	

=== Elections of the 1970s ===
1970 general election: South Angus
Party	Candidate	Votes	%	±%
Conservative	Jock Bruce-Gardyne	20,439	56.2	−14.2
SNP	Malcolm Slesser	8,406	23.1	New
Labour	Herbert Coutts	7,557	20.8	−8.8
Majority		12,033	33.1	−7.7
Turnout		36,402	73.8	+2.6
Conservative hold		Swing		

February 1974 general election: South Angus
Party	Candidate	Votes	%	±%
Conservative	Jock Bruce-Gardyne	20,522	49.5	−6.7
SNP	Malcolm Slesser	15,179	36.6	+13.5
Labour	Robert William Perks	5,721	13.8	−7.0
Majority		5,343	12.9	−20.2
Turnout		41,422	79.9	+6.1
Conservative hold		Swing		

October 1974 general election: Angus South
Party	Candidate	Votes	%	±%
SNP	Andrew Welsh	17,073	43.8	+7.2
Conservative	Jock Bruce-Gardyne	15,249	39.2	−10.3
Labour	Neal Lorimer Geaughan	4,103	10.5	−3.3
Liberal	Henry O'Farrell Will	2,529	6.5	New
Majority		1,824	4.6	N/A
Turnout		38,954	74.5	−5.4
SNP gain from Conservative		Swing		

1979 general election: Angus South
Party	Candidate	Votes	%	±%
Conservative	Peter Fraser	20,029	43.6	+4.4
SNP	Andrew Welsh	19,066	41.5	−2.3
Labour	Ian Gordon Philip	4,023	10.1	−0.4
Liberal	Henry O'Farrell Will	2,218	4.8	−1.7
Majority		963	2.1	N/A
Turnout		45,936	79.9	+5.4
Conservative gain from SNP		Swing	+3.4	

== See also ==
- Angus South (Scottish Parliament constituency)
