= Philip Dunne (Ludlow MP) =

British politician (born 1958)

The Right Honourable Philip Dunne
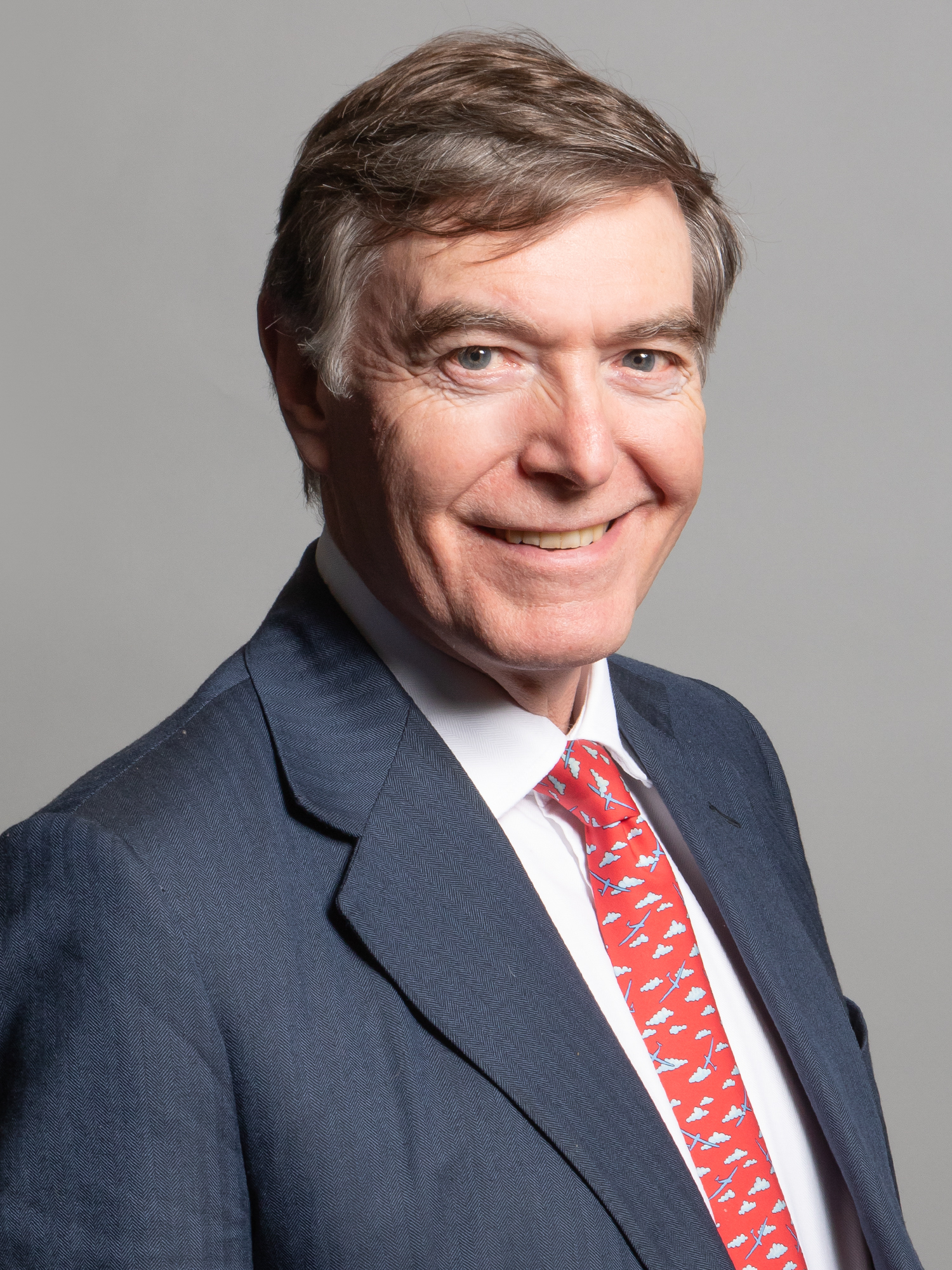

Chair of the Environmental Audit Select Committee
- In office 29 January 2020 – 30 May 2024
- Preceded by: Mary Creagh
- Succeeded by: Toby Perkins

Minister of State for Health
- In office 15 July 2016 – 9 January 2018
- Prime Minister: Theresa May
- Preceded by: Ben Gummer
- Succeeded by: Steve Barclay

Parliamentary Under-Secretary of State for Defence Procurement
- In office 4 September 2012 – 15 July 2016
- Prime Minister: David Cameron
- Preceded by: Peter Luff
- Succeeded by: Harriett Baldwin

Member of Parliament for Ludlow
- In office 5 May 2005 – 30 May 2024
- Preceded by: Matthew Green
- Succeeded by: Constituency abolished

Personal details
- Born: 14 August 1958 (age 68) Ludlow, Shropshire, England
- Party: Conservative
- Spouse: Domenica Dunne
- Education: Eton College
- Alma mater: Keble College, Oxford

Philip Martin Dunne (born 14 August 1958) is a British politician who served as the Member of Parliament (MP) for the Ludlow constituency in Shropshire from 2005 to 2024. He is a member of the Conservative Party.

He has been a farmer since 1987, at his family's farm in Herefordshire, at Leintwardine. He was elected in 2001 as a councillor on the South Shropshire District Council, of which he was the Conservative leader in 2003–2005. He was also secretary of the Ludlow Conservative Association for a year in 2001.

Dunne served as Parliamentary Under-Secretary of State for Defence Procurement from 2012 to 2016 and as Minister of State for Health from 2016 to 2018.

In June 2020, Dunne's contact details were found in an address book belonging to the disgraced financier Jeffrey Epstein.

== Early life and education ==
Philip Dunne was born in Ludlow, Shropshire, and has an ancestry of politicians and courtiers. He is the son of Sir Thomas Dunne KG, the former Lord Lieutenant of Herefordshire and Worcestershire, the grandson of Philip Russell Rendel Dunne, and the great-grandson of Edward Marten Dunne. He was educated at Abberley Hall School, followed by Eton College and Keble College, Oxford, where he was awarded a degree in Philosophy, Politics and Economics. At Oxford he was a member of the Bullingdon Club.

Interviewed in 2005, Dunne said that he had taken no part in student politics at Oxford, but his tutors Paul Hayes and Larry Siedentop had influenced him by drawing international political themes to his attention.

== Political career ==
Dunne was first elected to the House of Commons at the 2005 general election, when he was elected as MP for Ludlow, winning with 45.1% of the vote and a majority of 2,027. He made his maiden speech on 8 June 2005.

Prior to the Conservative leadership election of 2005, he balloted his constituents about whom he should vote for in the contest. He ended up supporting David Cameron for leader.

During his first term in Parliament (2005–2010), Dunne was a member of the Work and Pensions Select committee, and in 2006 he was appointed to the Public Accounts Committee.

At the 2010 general election, Dunne was re-elected as MP for Ludlow with an increased vote share of 52.8% and an increased majority of 9,749.

Following the formation of the Liberal Democrat–Conservative coalition government, Dunne was appointed as an assistant government whip in the House of Commons. In September 2012, he was appointed Minister for Defence Equipment, Support and Technology with responsibility for defence procurement and defence exports. In this role, he was the minister responsible for, and one of the backers of, the bill which became the Defence Reform Act 2014.

At the 2015 general election, Dunne was again re-elected with an increased vote share of 54.3% and an increased majority of 18,929.

In July 2016, he was appointed as Minister for State for Health. In Prime Minister Theresa May's January 2018 reshuffle, he was dismissed from his ministerial post. Before losing his post, Dunne was accused of belittling the winter NHS bed crisis by suggesting unwell people in accident and emergency departments of hospitals without beds could instead use seats.

Dunne was again re-elected at the snap 2017 general election with an increased vote share of 62.9% and an increased majority of 19,286.

Dunne was appointed to the Privy Council of the United Kingdom in the 2018 Special Honours, giving him the honorific title "The Right Honourable" for life.

In the 2019 leadership election, Dunne managed Jeremy Hunt's campaign.

In November 2019, at a hustings held in Church Stretton, Dunne told the Labour candidate, Kuldip Sahota, that he was "talking through his turban". He was again re-elected at the 2019 general election with an increased vote share of 64.1% and an increased majority of 23,648.

On 29 January 2020, Dunne was elected as chairman of the Environmental Audit Committee, spearheading the examination of government policies' impact on the environment. In this remit, he proposed a private member's bill aiming at sanctioning water companies "that discharge sewage into Britain's rivers".

In May 2023, Dunne announced he would stand down at the 2024 general election.

== Personal life ==
He is married to Domenica and they have two sons and two daughters. As well as farming, Dunne has worked in banking. He also helped start up Ottakar's bookshop.

Parliament of the United Kingdom
Preceded by Matthew Green	Member of Parliament for Ludlow; 2005–2024	Constituency abolished
