= Eric Cockeram =

British Conservative Party politician (1924–2021)

Eric Paul Cockeram

Member of Parliament for Bebington
- In office 18 June 1970 – 8 February 1974
- Preceded by: Edwin Brooks
- Succeeded by: Alfred Bates

Member of Parliament for Ludlow
- In office 3 May 1979 – 18 May 1987
- Preceded by: Jasper More
- Succeeded by: Christopher Gill

Personal details
- Born: 4 July 1924
- Died: 25 December 2021 (aged 97)
- Party: Conservative
- Children: 4
- Occupation: Politician, Army Captain

Eric Paul Cockeram (4 July 1924 – 25 December 2021) was a British Conservative Party politician.

== Life and career ==
Cockeram was born on 4 July 1924 and was educated at Birkenhead School.

He served in the British Army in the Second World War, taking part in the D-Day landings during World War II as a Second Lieutenant in the 2nd Battalion of the Gloucestershire Regiment where he was wounded in the face by a grenade on Gold Beach. He was demobilised with the rank of Captain.

He worked in his family's tailoring and outfitters firm, Watson Prickard, becoming company chairman.

Originally elected Member of Parliament for Bebington in 1970, Cockeram lost his seat (which he fought unsuccessfully as the renamed Bebington and Ellesmere Port) in both the 1974 general elections. Elected for Ludlow in 1979, he suddenly announced his retirement weeks before the 1987 general election, following allegations of multiple share applications for British Telecom and British Gas. This followed the Thatcher government's privatisation of both organisations, which allowed members of the public to buy shares in them. One of the share applications was for Cockeram's grandchildren but he denied wrongdoing and the Crown Prosecution Service decided he had no case to answer.

Cockeram died on 25 December 2021, at the age of 97. At time of his death he was married with four children and was one of the few surviving former MPs who saw active service during World War II.

Parliament of the United Kingdom
Preceded by Edwin Brooks	Member of Parliament for Bebington; 1970–1974	Constituency abolished
Preceded by Jasper More	Member of Parliament for Ludlow; 1979–1987	Succeeded by Christopher Gill
