= Paul Hayes (historian) =

English historian and academic

Paul Hayes FRHistS
- Born: 12 February 1942
- Died: 30 October 1995 (aged 53)

Academic background
- Education: St John's College, Oxford; Nuffield College, Oxford

Academic work
- Discipline: Historian
- Sub-discipline: Modern history; European history; political history; fascism; Vidkun Quisling
- Institutions: Keble College, Oxford; Faculty of Modern History, University of Oxford
- Notable students: Imran Khan; Philip Dunne

Paul Martin Hayes FRHistS (12 February 1942 – 30 October 1995) was an English historian and academic, a fellow and tutor of Keble College, Oxford. His field of study was the 20th century, with a focus on fascism.

== Early life ==
Hayes was educated at St John's College, Oxford, where in 1963 he took his first degree in Modern History, and then at Nuffield College, where he completed a doctorate, and also at the Universities of Dijon, Marburg, Lausanne, and Oslo.

== Career ==
In 1965, Hayes was elected as a fellow and tutor at Keble College, Oxford, where he remained until shortly before his death, and was also a University Lecturer in Modern History. At Keble, he was an enthusiast for college cricket, and was instrumental in securing the admission of Imran Khan, after he had been turned down by Cambridge.

Hayes was Junior Proctor of the University for the year 1980–1981, with responsibility for enforcing University discipline and sanctions and for the conduct of public examinations. In the 1980s, he was Tutor for Admissions at Keble.

In 1991, as Senior Tutor of Keble, Hayes was involved in a dispute over Phil Weston, a cricketer who had been expected to join the college but did not do so after being refused permission to absent himself for much of his first term on a cricket tour of Pakistan. Hayes was accused of intransigence by Peter Roebuck, writing in The Times, but he made a firm reply, and others defended him.

Interviewed in 2005, one of Hayes’s pupils, the Conservative politician Philip Dunne, said that he had taken no part in student politics at Oxford but Hayes and Larry Siedentop had influenced him by drawing international political themes to his attention.

== Personal life ==
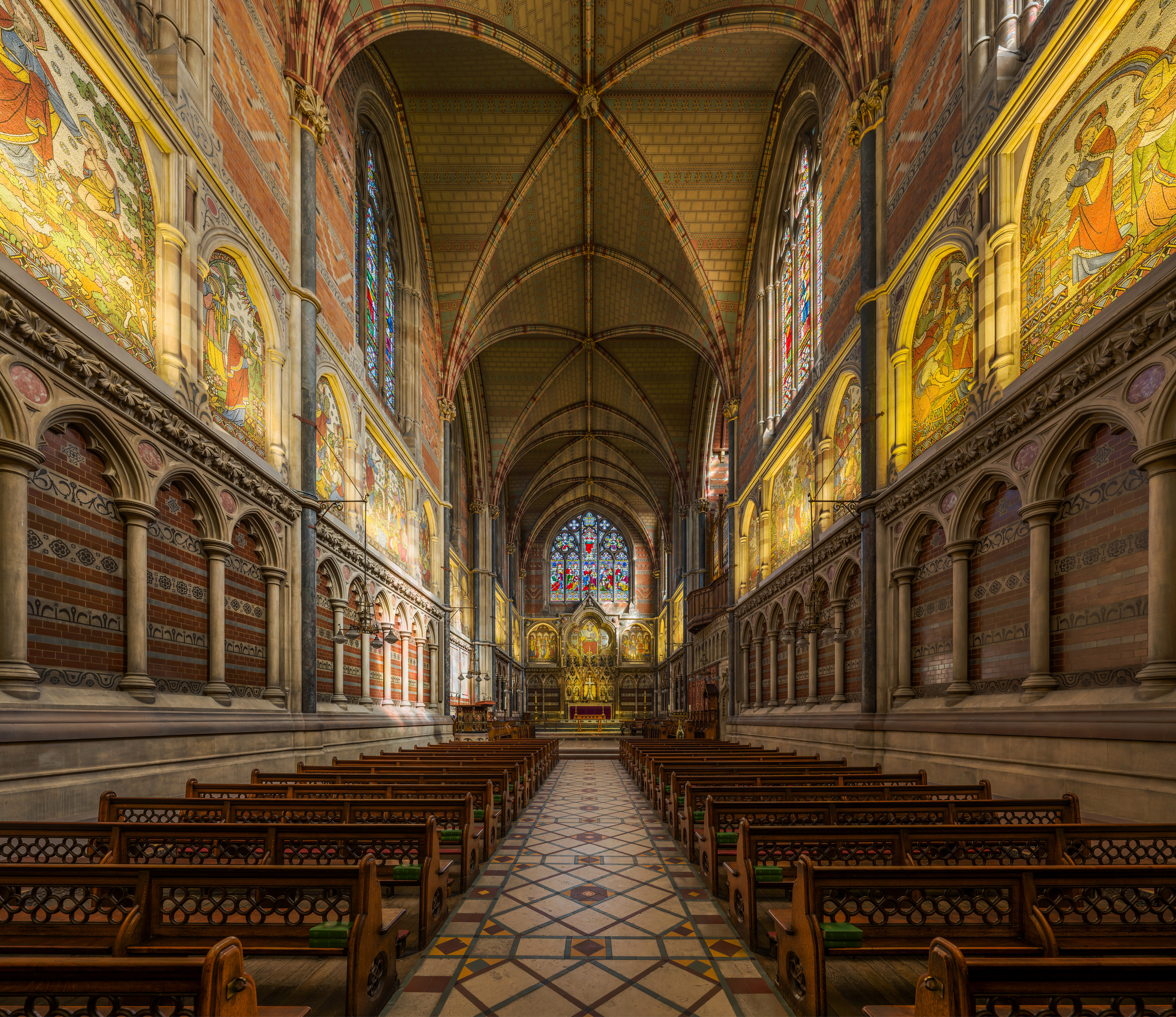
Keble College chapel

On 3 February 1981, at Oxford, Hayes married Ursel Kiehne. They had one son and one daughter, born in 1991.

Hayes died on 30 October 1995, after a long illness. A memorial service was held in the Keble College chapel on 20 January 1996.

== Publications ==
- "Quisling's Political Ideas", in Journal of Contemporary History (January, 1966)
- Quisling. The Career and Political Ideas of Vidkun Quisling 1887-1945 (David & Charles, 1971)
- Fascism (London: Allen & Unwin, 1973, ISBN 9780043200896)
- "Britain, Germany, and the Admiralty's Plans for Attacking German Territory", in Lawrence Freedman, Paul Hayes, and Robert O'Neill (eds.), War, Strategy, and International Politics: Essays in Honour of Sir Michael Howard (Oxford: Clarendon Press, 1992)
- Themes in Modern European History 1890–1945 (Routledge, 1992, ISBN 9780203185131)

== Honours ==
Hayes was elected a Fellow of the Royal Historical Society
