= History of parliamentary constituencies and boundaries in Cheshire =

The ceremonial county of Cheshire, which comprises the unitary authorities of Cheshire East, Cheshire West and Chester, Halton and Warrington, returned 11 MPs to the UK Parliament from 1997 to 2024. Under the 2023 review of Westminster constituencies, coming into effect for the 2024 general election, the boundary commission proposed 12 constituencies, including two which crossed the border into the county of Merseyside.

Under the Local Government Act 1972, which came into effect on 1 April 1974, the boundaries of the historic/administrative county of Cheshire were significantly altered. Over half the electorate was transferred to the new metropolitan counties of Greater Manchester and Merseyside, partly compensated by the addition of Warrington, Widnes and surrounding areas to the north which were transferred in from Lancashire. These changes were reflected in the following redistribution of parliamentary seats which did not come into effect until the 1983 general election, resulting in a net reduction in the county's representation from 17 to 10 MPs.

== Number of seats ==
The table below shows the number of MPs representing Cheshire at each major redistribution of seats affecting the county.

Year	County seats^{1}	Borough seats^{1}	Total
Historic county
Prior to 1832	2	2	4
1832–1865	4	6	10
1865–1868^{2}	4	7	11
1868–1885	6	8	14
1885–1918	8	5	13
1918–1945	9	5	14
1945–1950	9	6	15
1950–1955	9	6	15
1955–1974	10	6	16
1974	9	8	17
Current county
1974–1983^{3}	8	1	9
1983–1997	8	2	10
1997–2024	9	2	11
2024–present	11	1	12^{4}

^{1}Prior to 1950, seats were classified as County Divisions or Parliamentary Boroughs. Since 1950, they have been classified as County or Borough Constituencies.

^{2}Borough of Birkenhead (1 member) enfranchised by Act of Parliament to replace disenfranchised boroughs.

^{3}Approximate equivalent number of constituencies. Prior to the redistribution coming into effect for the 1983 general election, 6 constituencies were split between Cheshire and the new counties of Greater Manchester and Merseyside and 7 were wholly within the reconfigured county.

^{4}Includes two cross-county border constituencies shared with Merseyside.

== Constituency timeline ==
County seat Borough seat

=== Historic county to 1974 ===
Constituency	Prior to 1832	1832–1865	1865–1868	1868–1885	1885–1918	1918–1945	1945–1950	1950–1955	1955–1974	1974–1983
Cheshire	1545–1832 (2 MPs)									
South Cheshire		1832–1868 (2 MPs)								
Birkenhead			1865–1918					1950→		
Birkenhead East						1918–1950				
Birkenhead West						1918–1950				
West Cheshire				1868–1885 (2 MPs)						
Wirral					1885-1983					
Wallasey						1918→				
Bebington								1950–1974		
Bebington and Ellesmere Port										1974-1983
City of Chester	1545–1885 (2 MPs)				1885–1918	1918→				
Eddisbury					1885–1950					
Runcorn								1950-1983		
Nantwich									1955-1983	
Crewe					1885-1983					
Mid Cheshire				1868–1885 (2 MPs)						
Northwich					1885-1983					
Knutsford					1885-1983					
Bucklow							1945–1950			
Altrincham					1885–1945					
Altrincham and Sale							1945→			
North Cheshire		1832–1868 (2 MPs)								
East Cheshire				1868–1885 (2 MPs)						
Stalybridge				1868–1918						
Stalybridge and Hyde						1918→				
Hyde					1885–1918					
Stockport		1832–1950 (2 MPs)								
Stockport North								1950-1983		
Stockport South								1950-1983		
Cheadle								1950–1974		1974→
Hazel Grove										1974→
Macclesfield		1832–1885 (2 MPs)			1885→					
Constituency	Prior to 1832	1832–1865	1865–1868	1868–1885	1885–1918	1918–1945	1945–1950	1950–1955	1955–1974	1974–1983

=== Current ceremonial county from 1974 ===
Constituency	1974–1983	1983–1997	1997–2024	2024–present
Warrington^{1}	←1983			
Warrington North		1983–2024		2024–present
Newton^{1} (part)	←1983			
Warrington South		1983–2024		2024–present
Runcorn	←1983			
Runcorn and Helsby				2024–present
Weaver Vale			1997–2024	
Halton		1983–2024		
Widnes and Halewood (part)				2024–present
Widnes^{1} (part)	←1983			
Bebington and Ellesmere Port (part)	1974-1983			
Ellesmere Port and Bromborough (part)				2024–present
Ellesmere Port and Neston		1983–2024		
Wirral (part)	←1983			
Chester North and Neston				2024–present
City of Chester	←2024			
Northwich	←1983			
Chester South and Eddisbury				2024–present
Eddisbury		1983–2024		
Nantwich	←1983			
Mid Cheshire				2024–present
Crewe and Nantwich		1983–present		
Crewe	←1983			
Congleton		1983–present		
Knutsford (part)	←1983			
Tatton		1983–present		
Macclesfield	←present			
Constituency	1974-1983	1983-1997	1997–2024	2024–present

^{1} Part of Lancashire prior to April 1974

== Boundary reviews ==
=== Historic county ===
==== Prior to 1832 ====
As a county palatine, Cheshire was unrepresented in the House of Commons until 1543. Under the terms of the Chester and Cheshire (Constituencies) Act 1542, the County of Chester (Cheshire) was thereafter represented by two knights of the shire and the City of Chester was represented by two burgesses.

==== 1832 ====
The Reform Act 1832 radically changed the representation of the House of Commons, with the county being divided into the Northern and Southern Divisions, each returning two MPs. North Cheshire covered the northern and eastern parts of the county, comprising the hundreds of Bucklow and Macclesfield; South Cheshire covered the southern and western parts, comprising the hundreds of Broxton, Eddisbury, Nantwich, Northwich and Wirral. In addition to Chester, the parliamentary boroughs of Macclesfield and Stockport were established, both returning two MPs.

==== 1865 ====
Under the terms of the Appropriation of Seats (Sudbury and Saint Albans) Act 1861, Birkenhead was enfranchised as a single-member parliamentary borough. It was first contested at the 1865 general election.

==== 1868 ====
Under the Representation of the People Act 1867, the county was further divided, with the creation of Mid Cheshire, comprising the Bucklow and Northwich Hundreds, transferred from North Cheshire and South Cheshire respectively. Stalybridge was established as a single-member Borough.

Subsequently, the Boundary Act 1868 renamed the Northern and Southern Divisions as East Cheshire and West Cheshire respectively.

==== 1885 ====
Under the Redistribution of Seats Act 1885, the three 2-member county divisions were replaced by eight single-member constituencies, namely Altrincham, Crewe, Eddisbury, Hyde, Knutsford, Macclesfield, Northwich and Wirral. The Parliamentary Borough of Macclesfield was disenfranchised due to corruption. The representation of the City of Chester was reduced to one MP.

==== 1918 ====
Under the Representation of the People Act 1918, the number of constituencies in Cheshire was increased by one. The major changes were:

- the Parliamentary Borough of Chester was converted into a county division, gaining mainly rural areas from Eddisbury and Wirral;
- the Parliamentary Borough of Stalybridge and the county Division of Hyde were abolished and the new Division of Stalybridge and Hyde created, encompassing Dukinfield, Hyde, Stalybridge and Longdendale. Bredbury, Romily and Marple were transferred to Macclesfield and Hazel Grove to Knutsford;
- Birkenhead was divided into East and West Divisions and Wallasey was created as a Parliamentary Borough, carved out of the Wirral county Division; and
- Stockport continued as a two-member Borough, with boundaries aligned to the County Borough which had expanded through absorbing the Urban Districts of Reddish and Heaton Norris (previously part of the Stretford Division of Lancashire), and into neighbouring parishes in the former Hyde Division.

Other boundary changes included:

- Bramhall transferred from Altrincham to Knutsford;
- Sandbach from Crewe to Northwich; and
- Disley and Whaley Bridge from Knutsford to Macclesfield.

==== 1945 ====
The House of Commons (Redistribution of Seats) Act 1944 set up Boundary Commissions to carry out periodic reviews of the distribution of parliamentary constituencies. It also authorised an initial review to subdivide abnormally large constituencies (those exceeding an electorate of 100,000) in time for the 1945 election. This was implemented by the Redistribution of Seats Order 1945 under which Cheshire was allocated one additional seat, by splitting the Altrincham Division into two seats:

- Altrincham and Sale Parliamentary Borough, comprising the two respective municipal boroughs; and
- Bucklow County Division, comprising the urban districts of Bowdon, Cheadle and Gatley, Hale and Lymm and surrounding rural areas. It also included the former parishes of Baguley, Northenden and Northen Etchells which had been absorbed into the county borough of Manchester.

Handforth, which had been absorbed into the Urban District of Wilmslow, now included in the Knutsford seat.

==== 1950 ====
As a result of the redistribution enacted by the Representation of the People Act 1948, Cheshire's representation remained at 15 seats. However, there were significant changes to the make-up of the constituencies as follows:

- In the Wirral, Birkenhead East and Birkenhead West were abolished and Birkenhead re-established, comprising the county borough excluding 5 wards in the south; these were included in a new constituency, named Bebington, with the municipal borough of that name, previously part of the Wirral constituency. Wirral also lost the parts now in the expanded county boroughs of Birkenhead and Wallasey to the respective constituencies;
- a new constituency named Runcorn was created, comprising the urban districts of Runcorn (previously part of Northwich) and Lymm (previously part of Bucklow) and the rural district of Runcorn (previously split between Eddisbury, Northwich and Knutsford);
- a new constituency named Cheadle was created, comprising the urban districts of Cheadle and Gatley (previously part of Bucklow), Hazel Grove and Bramhall (previously part of Knutsford), Bredbury and Romiley, and Marple (previously part of Macclesfield);
- Eddisbury was abolished and was distributed between Crewe (the parts in the rural district of Nantwich), Northwich (the rural district of Tarvin, including Malpas and Tarporley, and the parts in the rural district of Northwich) and Runcorn (the parts in the rural district thereof, including Frodsham);
- Bucklow was abolished and distributed between Cheadle (Cheadle and Gatley), Runcorn (Lymm) and Knutsford (Hale, Bowdon and surrounding rural areas), with the parts now incorporated into Manchester forming the new constituency of Manchester, Wythenshawe;
- the 2-seat Borough of Stockport was abolished and replaced by the single-member seats of Stockport North and Stockport South;
- Alsager and Sandbach were added to Knutsford, transferred from Crewe and Northwich respectively; and
- Bollington and the parts of the rural district of Macclesfield, including Poynton, transferred from Knutsford to Macclesfield.

==== 1955 ====
The First Periodic Review of Westminster constituencies resulted in the creation of Nantwich, formed from parts of the constituencies of Crewe (the urban district of Nantwich and most of the rural district of Nantwich) and Northwich (the urban districts of Middlewich and Winsford and parts of the rural districts of Northwich and Tarvin).

The only other change was the transfer of the urban districts of Alsager and Sandbach from Knutsford to Crewe.

==== 1974 (Feb) ====
The Second Periodic Review, which came into effect for the February 1974 election, resulted in the creation of Hazel Grove. This constituency was carved out of the Cheadle constituency, leaving the urban district of Cheadle and Gatley, to which the urban district of Wilmslow was added, transferred from Knutsford. Alderley Edge was transferred from Knutsford to Macclesfield.

In the Wirral, Bebington was abolished, being replaced by Bebington and Ellesmere Port, with the latter transferred from the Wirral constituency. The parts of the county borough of Birkenhead previously in Bebington were transferred back to the Birkenhead constituency, with the exception of Prenton ward, which was transferred to Wirral. Upton ward was also transferred to Wirral, from Birkenhead.

=== Current ceremonial county ===
==== 1974 (Apr) ====
Shortly after the Second Periodic Review came into effect, the county was subject to a major reconfiguration under the terms of the Local Government Act 1972. As a result, with effect from 1 April 1974, the constituencies of Altrincham and Sale, Hazel Grove, Stalybridge and Hyde^{1}, Stockport North and Stockport South, most of Cheadle and northern parts of Knutsford were now part of the metropolitan county of Greater Manchester; and the constituencies of Birkenhead and Wallasey and the majority of Bebington and Ellesmere Port, and Wirral were now part of the new metropolitan county of Merseyside.

Partly offsetting these losses, the county gained parts of southern Lancashire not included in Greater Manchester or Merseyside, including Widnes and the county borough of Warrington. This area was covered by the constituency of Warrington and parts of Newton and Widnes.

^{1}Except the small part comprising the former rural district of Tintwistle, which was transferred to Derbyshire.

==== 1983 ====
The next change to parliamentary constituency boundaries, following the recommendations of the Third Periodic Review, reflected the change in county boundaries and reorganisation of local government authorities in 1974. This review did not come into effect for a further nine years, at the 1983 general election, and resulted in wholescale changes, with only the constituencies of City of Chester and Macclesfield being retained in the reconfigured county. Bebington and Ellesmere Port, Crewe, Knutsford, Nantwich, Newton, Northwich, Runcorn, Warrington, Widnes and Wirral were abolished and the following new constituencies were created:

- Congleton, based on the Borough of Congleton, comprising: the former municipal borough of Congleton, previously part of the constituency of Macclesfield; Alsager, Sandbach and Haslington, previously part of Crewe; Middlewich, previously part of Nantwich; and rural areas comprising the former rural district of Congleton, previously part of Knutsford;
- Crewe and Nantwich, comprising the former municipal borough of Crewe, previously part of the Crewe constituency, and Nantwich and remaining parts of the new Borough of Crewe and Nantwich (excluding Haslington), previously part of the Nantwich constituency;
- Eddisbury (re-established), comprising parts of the former constituencies of Nantwich (including Malpas and Winsford), Northwich (including Cuddington and Weaverham) and Runcorn (including Frodsham and Helsby);
- Ellesmere Port and Neston, based on the Borough of Ellesmere Port and Neston, comprising the former municipal borough of Ellesmere Port, previously part of the Bebington and Ellesmere Port constituency, and the former urban district of Neston, previously part of Wirral. Also included Elton and rural areas to the north of Chester from the City of Chester constituency;
- Halton, based on the Borough of Halton, combining the former urban district of Runcorn (excluding Norton) and the former municipal borough of Widnes, previously parts of the former constituencies of the same names;
- Tatton, comprising the towns of Northwich and Knutsford, formerly parts of the abolished constituencies of the same names. Also included the former urban district of Wilmslow, previously part the constituency of Cheadle;
- Warrington North, comprising the majority of the former constituency of Warrington, together with parts of the abolished Newton constituency, including Poulton, Winwick and Woolston; and
- Warrington South, comprising: Norton (in Runcorn Borough) and areas to the south of the Manchester Ship Canal (including Lymm) now part of the Borough of Warrington, previously part of Runcorn constituency; a small part of Warrington; and parts of Newton, including Great Sankey and Penketh.

==== 1997 ====
The Fourth Review saw another increase in the number of constituencies, with the creation Weaver Vale, which was made up as follows:

- parts of Runcorn, transferred from Halton;
- Norton, transferred from Warrington South;
- Frodsham, Helsby and Weaverham, transferred from Eddisbury; and
- Northwich, transferred from Tatton.

Other changes included:

- rural areas to the north of Chester (excluding Elton) transferred back from Ellesmere Port and Neston to City of Chester;
- Haslington transferred from Congleton to Crewe and Nantwich;
- western parts of Crewe and Nantwich, including Audlem. transferred to Eddisbury;
- Alderley Edge transferred from Macclesfield to Tatton; and
- boundary between the two Warrington seats realigned, with the town centre being transferred from Warrington South to Warrington North.

==== 2010 ====
At the Fifth Periodic Review there were no changes to Cheshire's representation, with only minor changes to boundaries due primarily to the revision of local authority ward boundaries. The Halton Borough ward of Castlefield was transferred from Weaver Vale to Halton.

==== 2024 ====
For the 2023 Periodic Review of Westminster constituencies, which redrew the constituency map ahead of the 2024 United Kingdom general election, the Boundary Commission for England opted to combine Cheshire with Merseyside as a sub-region of the North West Region, with the creation of the two cross-county boundary constituencies of Ellesmere Port and Bromborough, and Widnes and Halewood, which avoided the need for a constituency spanning the River Mersey below Warrington. As a consequence, there were significant changes in the west of the county:

- The town of Neston was transferred from Ellesmere Port and Neston to City of Chester, resulting in these constituencies being replaced by Chester North and Neston, and Ellesmere Port and Bromborough respectively;
- Halton was abolished, with Widnes being included in the new constituency of Widnes and Halewood, and Runcorn in the new constituency of Runcorn and Helsby;
- A new constituency named Mid Cheshire was created, comprising the towns of Northwich from Weaver Vale, Winsford from Eddisbury, and Middlewich from Congleton;
- Having lost Northwich, Weaver Vale was abolished, with most of the rest of the constituency, including the towns of Frodsham and Helsby being included in Runcorn and Helsby;
- To compensate for the loss of Winsford, Eddisbury regained Weaverham, and added areas to the south of the River Dee from City of Chester - as a consequence it was renamed Chester South and Eddisbury; and
- Lymm was transferred from Warrington South to Tatton.

== Maps ==
=== Historic county ===
1885-1918

1918-1950

1950-1955

1955-1974

1974 (Feb-Apr)

=== Current county ===
1974 (Apr)-1983

1983-1997

1997-2010

2010-2024

2024–present

== Communities timeline ==
The table below shows which constituencies represented major communities within the current county from 1885 onwards.

Community		1885–1918	1918–1945	1945–1950	1950–1955	1955–1974	1974–1983	1983–1997	1997–2024	2024–present
Alderley Edge		Knutsford					Macclesfield		Tatton	
Alsager		Crewe			Knutsford	Crewe		Congleton		
Bollington		Knutsford			Macclesfield					
Chester	North	City of Chester								Chester North and Neston
Chester	South	City of Chester								Chester South and Eddisbury
Congleton		Macclesfield						Congleton		
Crewe		Crewe						Crewe and Nantwich		
Culcheth		Leigh	Newton					Warrington North		
Disley		Knutsford	Macclesfield							
Ellesmere Port		Wirral					Bebbington and Ellesmere Port	Ellesmere Port and Neston		Ellesmere Port and Bromborough
Frodsham		Eddisbury			Runcorn			Eddisbury	Weaver Vale	Runcorn and Helsby
Handforth		Altrincham		Knutsford			Cheadle	Tatton		
Haslington		Crewe						Congleton	Crewe and Nantwich	
Holmes Chapel		Knutsford						Congleton		
Knutsford		Knutsford						Tatton		
Lymm		Altrincham		Bucklow	Runcorn			Warrington South		Tatton
Macclesfield		Macclesfield								
Middlewich		Northwich				Nantwich		Congleton		Mid Cheshire
Nantwich		Crewe				Nantwich		Crewe and Nantwich		
Neston		Wirral						Ellesmere Port and Neston		Chester North and Neston
Northwich		Northwich						Tatton	Weaver Vale	Mid Cheshire
Poynton		Knutsford			Macclesfield					
Runcorn		Northwich			Runcorn			Halton		Runcorn and Helsby
Sandbach		Crewe	Northwich		Knutsford	Crewe		Congleton		
Warrington	Central	Warrington						Warrington North		
Warrington	North/East^{1}	Newton						Warrington North		
Warrington	South^{2}	Knutsford			Runcorn			Warrington South		
Warrington	West^{3}	Newton						Warrington South		
Weaverham		Northwich						Eddisbury	Weaver Vale	Chester South and Eddisbury
Widnes		Widnes						Halton		Widnes and Halewood
Wilmslow		Knutsford					Cheadle	Tatton		
Winsford		Northwich				Nantwich		Eddisbury		Mid Cheshire
Community		1885–1918	1918–1945	1945–1950	1950–1955	1955–1974	1974–1983	1983–1997	1997–2024	2024–present

^{1} Birchwood, Burtonwood, Poulton-with-Fearnhead, Winwick, Woolston

^{2} Appleton, Grappenhall, Stockton Heath

^{3} Great Sankey, Penketh

== See also ==
- List of parliamentary constituencies in Cheshire
