= Ellesmere Port and Neston (constituency) =

UK Parliament constituency (1983–2024)

Coordinates: 53.276°N 2.969°W

- Former county constituency for the House of Commons
- Boundary of Ellesmere Port and Neston in Cheshire

- Location of Cheshire within England
- County: Cheshire
- Electorate: 69,522 (2018)
- Major settlements: Ellesmere Port and Neston

1983–2024
- Seats: One
- Created from: Bebington and Ellesmere Port, Wirral and City of Chester
- Replaced by: Ellesmere Port and Bromborough; Chester North and Neston

Ellesmere Port and Neston was a constituency (Note: A county constituency (for the purposes of election expenses and type of returning officer)) of the House of Commons of the UK Parliament. (Note: As with all constituencies, the constituency elects one Member of Parliament (MP) by the first-past-the-post system of election at least every five years.)

Further to the completion of the 2023 review of Westminster constituencies, the seat was subject to boundary changes which involved the loss of Neston to the new constituency of Chester North and Neston. To compensate, the Metropolitan Borough of Wirral wards of Bromborough and Eastham were transferred from the disappearing seat of Wirral South. As a consequence of these changes, the constituency was renamed Ellesmere Port and Bromborough, first contested at the 2024 general election.

== History ==
The constituency was formed in 1983, largely from the southern parts of the former Bebington and Ellesmere Port and Wirral constituencies. Both were former Conservative seats. Mike Woodcock of the Conservatives held the seat from the 1983 election until the 1992 election, when it was taken by Andrew Miller of the Labour Party. Miller held the seat until his retirement from the Commons in 2015, during which time it became a relatively safe Labour seat, and was succeeded by Justin Madders.

== Boundaries ==
Map of boundaries 2019–2024

1983–1997: The Borough of Ellesmere Port and Neston, and the City of Chester wards of Elton, Mollington, and Saughall.

The majority of the constituency (Ellesmere Port) had previously been one half of the abolished Bebington and Ellesmere Port constituency, whilst Neston had been a smaller part of the abolished Wirral constituency. The three City of Chester wards were transferred from the City of Chester constituency.

1997–2010: The Borough of Ellesmere Port and Neston, and the City of Chester ward of Elton.

The Mollington and Saughall wards transferred back to City of Chester.

2010–2019: The Parliamentary Constituencies (England) Order 2007 defined the boundaries as:

The Borough of Ellesmere Port and Neston (all wards), and the City of Chester wards of Elton and Mickle Trafford.

Minor changes due to revision of ward boundaries.

Before the new boundaries came into force for the 2010 election, the districts making up the county of Cheshire were abolished on 1 April 2009, being replaced by four unitary authorities. Consequently, the constituency's boundaries became:

The Cheshire West and Chester wards of Chester Villages (part), Ellesmere Port Town, Elton, Grange, Ledsham and Manor, Little Neston and Burton (part), Neston, Netherpool, Parkgate, Rossmore, St Paul's, Strawberry, Sutton, Whitby, and Willaston and Thornton.

2019–2024: Following a further local government ward boundary review in 2019, the boundaries were:

The Cheshire West and Chester wards of Central and Grange, Gowy Rural (part), Ledsham and Manor, Little Neston, Neston, Netherpool, Parkgate, Sandstone (part), Strawberry, Sutton Villages, Westminster, Whitby Groves, Whitby Park, Willaston and Thornton (part), and Wolverham.

The constituency included the industrial town of Ellesmere Port, the smaller residential town of Neston and villages such as Burton, Parkgate, Willaston, Elton and Mickle Trafford.

== Members of Parliament ==
Election	Member	Party
1983	Mike Woodcock	Conservative
1992	Andrew Miller	Labour
2015	Justin Madders	Labour

== Elections ==
=== Elections in the 2010s ===
General election 2019: Ellesmere Port and Neston
Party	Candidate	Votes	%	±%
Labour	Justin Madders	26,001	53.3	―5.9
Conservative	Alison Rodwell	17,237	35.4	―1.4
Liberal Democrats	Ed Gough	2,406	4.9	+3.1
Brexit Party	Christopher Stevens	2,138	4.4	New
Green	Chris Copeman	964	2.0	+1.3
Majority		8,764	17.9	―4.5
Turnout		46,746	69.3	―4.9
Labour hold		Swing	―2.2	

General election 2017: Ellesmere Port and Neston
Party	Candidate	Votes	%	±%
Labour	Justin Madders	30,137	59.2	+11.4
Conservative	Nigel Jones	18,747	36.8	+2.5
Liberal Democrats	Ed Gough	892	1.8	―1.5
UKIP	Fred Fricker	821	1.6	―10.4
Green	Steven Baker	342	0.7	―1.4
Majority		11,390	22.4	+8.9
Turnout		50,939	74.2	+5.6
Labour hold		Swing	+4.5	

General election 2015: Ellesmere Port and Neston
Party	Candidate	Votes	%	±%
Labour	Justin Madders	22,316	47.8	+3.2
Conservative	Katherine Fletcher	16,041	34.3	―0.4
UKIP	Jonathan Starkey	5,594	12.0	+8.3
Liberal Democrats	Trish Derraugh	1,563	3.3	―11.8
Green	Michelle Palmer	990	2.1	New
TUSC	Felicity Dowling	192	0.4	New
Independent	John Dyer	31	0.1	New
Majority		6,275	13.5	+3.8
Turnout		46,727	68.6	―1.5
Labour hold		Swing	+1.8	

General election 2010: Ellesmere Port and Neston
Party	Candidate	Votes	%	±%
Labour	Andrew Miller	19,750	44.6	―4.1
Conservative	Stuart Penketh	15,419	34.9	+2.1
Liberal Democrats	Denise Aspinall	6,663	15.1	―0.7
UKIP	Henry Crocker	1,619	3.7	+0.8
Independent	Jonathan Starkey	782	1.8	New
Majority		4,331	9.7	―9.7
Turnout		44,233	70.1	+8.8
Labour hold		Swing	―3.1	

=== Elections in the 2000s ===
General election 2005: Ellesmere Port and Neston
Party	Candidate	Votes	%	±%
Labour	Andrew Miller	20,371	48.4	―6.9
Conservative	Myles Hogg	13,885	33.0	+3.9
Liberal Democrats	Steve Cooke	6,607	15.7	+4.1
UKIP	Henry Crocker	1,206	2.9	+0.9
Majority		6,486	15.4	―10.8
Turnout		42,069	61.6	+0.7
Labour hold		Swing	―5.4	

General election 2001: Ellesmere Port and Neston
Party	Candidate	Votes	%	±%
Labour	Andrew Miller	22,964	55.3	―4.3
Conservative	Gareth Williams	12,103	29.1	0.0
Liberal Democrats	Stuart Kelly	4,828	11.6	+2.7
UKIP	Henry Crocker	824	2.0	New
Green	Geoff Nicholls	809	1.9	New
Majority		10,861	26.2	―4.3
Turnout		41,528	60.9	―16.9
Labour hold		Swing		

=== Elections in the 1990s ===
General election 1997: Ellesmere Port and Neston
Party	Candidate	Votes	%	±%
Labour	Andrew Miller	31,310	59.6	+13.5
Conservative	Lynn Turnbull	15,274	29.1	―13.7
Liberal Democrats	Joanna Pemberton	4,673	8.9	―1.0
Referendum	Colin S. Rodden	1,305	2.5	New
Majority		16,036	30.5	+27.2
Turnout		52,562	75.8	―8.3
Labour hold		Swing		

General election 1992: Ellesmere Port and Neston
Party	Candidate	Votes	%	±%
Labour	Andrew Miller	27,782	46.1	+4.9
Conservative	Andrew Pearce	25,793	42.8	―1.6
Liberal Democrats	Elizabeth B. Jewkes	5,944	9.9	―4.2
Green	Mike C. Money	589	1.0	New
Natural Law	Alan Rae	105	0.2	New
Majority		1,989	3.3	N/A
Turnout		60,213	84.1	+3.1
Labour gain from Conservative		Swing	+3.3	

=== Elections in the 1980s ===
General election 1987: Ellesmere Port and Neston
Party	Candidate	Votes	%	±%
Conservative	Mike Woodcock	25,664	44.4	―1.5
Labour Co-op	Helen Jones	23,811	41.2	+8.6
SDP	Simon Holbrook	8,143	14.1	―7.4
PRP	David Carson	185	0.3	New
Majority		1,853	3.2	―10.1
Turnout		57,803	81.0	+5.3
Conservative hold		Swing	―5.1	

General election 1983: Ellesmere Port and Neston
Party	Candidate	Votes	%	±%
Conservative	Mike Woodcock	24,371	45.9	
Labour	Andrew Davies	17,284	32.6	
Liberal	Lester George	11,413	21.5	
Majority		7,087	13.3	
Turnout		53,068	75.8	
Conservative win (new seat)				

== See also ==
- List of parliamentary constituencies in Cheshire
- History of parliamentary constituencies and boundaries in Cheshire
- Politics of the United Kingdom
