= Oakshott baronets =

Baronetcy in the Baronetage of the United Kingdom

The Oakshott Baronetcy, of Bebington in the County Palatine of Chester, is a title in the Baronetage of the United Kingdom. It was created on 10 July 1959 for the Hendrie Oakshott, Conservative Member of Parliament for Bebington. In 1964 he was further honoured when he was created a life peer as Baron Oakshott, of Bebington in the County Palatine of Chester. The life barony became extinct on his death in 1975 while he was succeeded in the baronetcy by his eldest son, the second Baronet. As of 2014 the title is held by the first Baronet's grandson, who succeeded in 2014.

== Oakshott baronets, of Bebington (1959) ==
- Sir Hendrie Dudley Oakshott, 1st Baronet (1904–1975) (created Baron Oakshott in 1964)
- Sir Anthony Hendrie Oakshott, 2nd Baronet (1929–2002)
- Sir Michael Arthur John Oakshott, 3rd Baronet (1932–2014)
- Sir Thomas Hendrie Oakshott, 4th Baronet (born 1959)

The heir presumptive is the present holder's brother Charles Michael Oakshott (born 1961). The heir presumptive's heir apparent is his son Patrick Charles Oakshott (born 1997).

Coat of arms of Oakshott baronets

Crest
In front of a mount Vert thereon an oak tree Proper fructed Gold the main-stem transfixed by two arrows in fess points to the dexter also Proper a bow fesswise Or.
Escutcheon
Per chevron Azure and Gules in chief two arrows in saltire between as many branches of oak slipped and fructed Or and in base a bear passant Argent.
Motto
In Quercu Robur
