= Mike Woodcock =

British politician

Michael Woodcock (born 10 April 1943) is a former British Conservative Party politician. He was the member of parliament (MP) for Ellesmere Port and Neston from 1983 to 1992. He was first elected at the 1983 general election, and was re-elected at the 1987 general election. Woodcock stood down at the 1992 general election, following which his seat was won by Labour's Andrew Miller.

Parliament of the United Kingdom
New constituency	Member of Parliament for Ellesmere Port and Neston; 1983 – 1992	Succeeded by Andrew Miller
