= Hendrie Oakshott, Baron Oakshott =

British Conservative Party politician

The Right Honourable The Lord Oakshott Bt
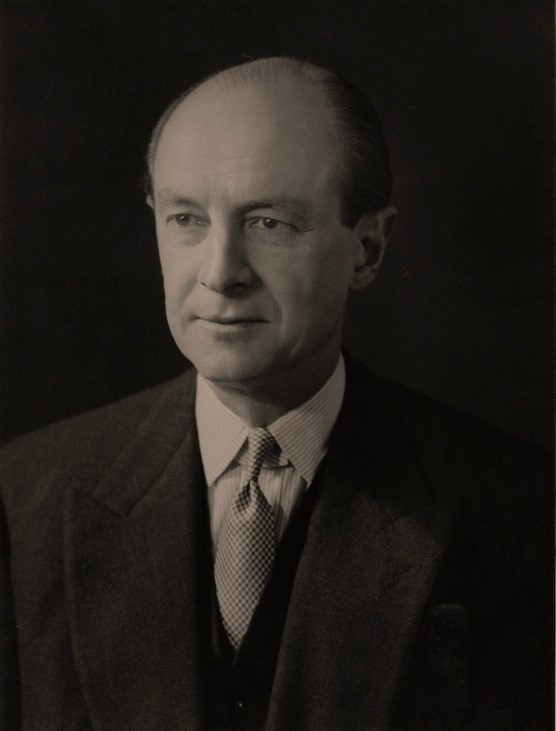
- Oakshott by Hay Wrightson

Treasurer of the Household
- In office 19 January 1957 – 16 January 1959
- Prime Minister: Harold Macmillan
- Preceded by: Tam Galbraith
- Succeeded by: Peter Legh

Comptroller of the Household
- In office 13 June 1955 – 19 January 1957
- Prime Minister: Anthony Eden
- Preceded by: Tam Galbraith
- Succeeded by: Gerald Wills

Member of Parliament for Bebington
- In office 23 February 1950 – 21 August 1964
- Preceded by: Constituency established
- Succeeded by: Geoffrey Howe

Personal details
- Born: Hendrie Dudley Oakshott; 8 November 1904 Cheshire, England
- Died: 1 February 1975 (aged 70) Liverpool, England
- Party: Conservative
- Spouse: Joan Withington (m. 1928)
- Children: 2
- Education: Trinity College, Cambridge

Hendrie Dudley Oakshott, Baron Oakshott (8 November 1904 – 1 February 1975), known as Sir Hendrie Oakshott, 1st Baronet, from 1959 to 1964, was a British Conservative Party politician. He was the Member of Parliament (MP) for Bebington from 1950 to 1964, and was made a life peer in 1964.

== Background ==
Oakshott was born in Cheshire on 8 November 1904, and attended Rugby School and Trinity College, Cambridge. He was a lieutenant colonel in the British Army.

== Political career ==
At the 1950 general election, he was elected as Member of Parliament (MP) for the Bebington constituency in the Wirral Peninsula, on Merseyside. He held his seat through three further general elections.

Oakshott was Comptroller of the Household from 1955 to 1957 and Treasurer of the Household from 1957 to 1959. He served as a parliamentary private secretary to Selwyn Lloyd from 1959 to 1962, first when Lloyd was Foreign Secretary, and then when he was Chancellor of the Exchequer. He was also a member of the British delegation to the Council of Europe from 1952 to 1958.

Oakshott retired from the House of Commons at the 1964 general election. He was then succeeded as MP by the future Chancellor and Foreign Secretary, Geoffrey Howe.

He was created a Baronet, of Bebington in the County Palatine of Chester, on 10 July 1959 and was further honoured when he was created a life peer as Baron Oakshott, of Bebington in the County Palatine of Chester on 21 August 1964. He served as a Deputy Speaker and Deputy Chairmen of Committees from 1967 to 1968.

== Personal life and death ==
Oakshott married Joan Withington in 1928, and they had two sons.

Lord Oakshott died at a hospital in Liverpool on 1 February 1975, aged 70. He was succeeded in the baronetcy by his eldest son Anthony. Lady Oakshott died in 1986.

== Coat of arms ==
Coat of arms of Hendrie Oakshott, Baron Oakshott

Crest
In front of a mount vert thereon on oak tree Proper fructed Gold the main-stem transfixed by two arrows in fess points to the dexter also Proper a bow fesswise Or.
Escutcheon
Per chevron Azure and Gules in chief two arrows in saltire between as many branches of oak slipped and fructed Or and in base a bear passant Argent.
Motto
In Quercu Robur

Parliament of the United Kingdom
New constituency	Member of Parliament for Bebington; 1950–1964	Succeeded by Geoffrey Howe
Political offices
Preceded by Tam Galbraith	Comptroller of the Household; 1955–1957	Succeeded by Gerald Wills
Preceded by Tam Galbraith	Treasurer of the Household; 1957–1959	Succeeded by Peter Legh
Baronetage of the United Kingdom
New creation	Baronet (of Bebington); 1959–1975	Succeeded by Sir Anthony Hendrie Oakshott
