= The Hayling College =

Location
- Church Road; Hayling Island, Hampshire, PO11 0NU; England; 50.7963°N 0.9750°W

Information
- Type: Foundation school
- Local authority: Hampshire
- Department for Education URN: 116423 Tables
- Ofsted: Reports
- Headteacher: Martyn Reah
- Gender: Coeducational
- Age: 11 to 16
- Enrolment: 558 as of January 2023
- Website: http://www.hayling.hants.sch.uk/

The Hayling College (formerly The Hayling School) is a coeducational foundation secondary school, located on Hayling Island in the English county of Hampshire.

It is administered by Hampshire County Council, which coordinates the schools admissions. It has also gained specialist status as a Maths and Computing College.

== Hayling United F.C. ==
Since 2005, The Hayling College has been the location of the home ground of Hayling United F.C. The football club use the school's playing fields as their ground, and have developed the site to include a seated stand, a covered standing area, boundary fences, pitch fences and floodlights, making it a Grade F ground, suitable for Step 5 of the football league pyramid. The club also use the school sports hall's changing rooms, and rent out the school's cafe as the official clubhouse to serve fresh food and drinks, and a bar up on match day.

== Notable former pupils ==
=== Hayling Island Secondary School ===
- Andrew Miller, Labour MP for Ellesmere Port and Neston
- Julia Fordham, Professional Singer-Songwriter
- Stephanie Lawrence, singer and musical theatre actress
- Peter Chilvers, inventor, engineer and original concept of windsurfer board.
- Alistair Sperring, Professional Footballer
- Reuben Jeacock, Entrepreneur
