= Bebington and Ellesmere Port =

UK Parliament constituency (1974–1983)

- Former borough constituency for the House of Commons
- Boundary of Bebington and Ellesmere Port in Cheshire, boundaries 1974–1983
- County: Cheshire

February 1974–1983
- Seats: one
- Created from: Bebington and Wirral
- Replaced by: Wirral South and Ellesmere Port and Neston

Bebington and Ellesmere Port was a parliamentary constituency in the United Kingdom, which returned one Member of Parliament (MP) to the House of Commons of the Parliament of the United Kingdom, elected by the first past the post system. It existed from Feb 1974 to 1983.

The constituency was centred on the towns of Bebington and Ellesmere Port on the Wirral Peninsula in England.

== History ==
Created for the February 1974 election, it ceased to exist with the implementation of the boundary changes brought in for the 1983 general election.

== Boundaries ==
The Boroughs of Bebington and Ellesmere Port.

Bebington was previously part of the former constituency of Bebington, and Ellesmere Port was transferred from the Wirral constituency.

From major local government boundary changes on 1 April 1974 until the constituency was abolished for the 1983 general election, Ellesmere Port was part of the new Borough of Ellesmere Port and Neston in Cheshire whilst Bebington comprised part of the Metropolitan Borough of Wirral in Merseyside, but its boundaries remained unchanged.

On abolition in 1983, Bebington became part of the new constituency of Wirral South and Ellesmere Port formed part of the new constituency of Ellesmere Port and Neston.

== Members of Parliament ==
Election	Member	Party
Feb 1974	Alf Bates	Labour
1979	Barry Porter	Conservative
1983	constituency abolished	

== Results ==
General election February 1974: Bebington and Ellesmere Port
Party	Candidate	Votes	%	±%
Labour	Alfred Bates	31,850	44.5	
Conservative	Eric Cockeram	27,388	38.3	
Liberal	P Handley	12,372	17.3	
Majority		4,462	6.2	
Turnout		71,610	83.5	
Labour win (new seat)				

General election October 1974: Bebington and Ellesmere Port
Party	Candidate	Votes	%	±%
Labour	Alfred Bates	32,310	47.5	+3.0
Conservative	Eric Cockeram	25,819	37.9	−0.4
Liberal	N Thomas	9,947	14.6	−2.7
Majority		6,491	9.6	+3.4
Turnout		68,076	78.6	−4.9
Labour hold		Swing		

General election 1979: Bebington and Ellesmere Port
Party	Candidate	Votes	%	±%
Conservative	Barry Porter	32,488	43.9	+6.0
Labour	Alfred Bates	32,002	43.2	−4.3
Liberal	Philip Gilchrist	9,591	13.0	−1.6
Majority		486	0.7	N/A
Turnout		68,076	80.7	+2.1
Conservative gain from Labour		Swing		

== See also ==
- Bebington (UK Parliament constituency)
- Ellesmere Port and Neston (UK Parliament constituency)
- History of parliamentary constituencies and boundaries in Cheshire
