= Barry Porter =

British lawyer and Conservative politician

Member of Parliament for Wirral South
- In office 9 June 1983 – 3 November 1996
- Preceded by: Constituency established
- Succeeded by: Ben Chapman

Member of Parliament for Bebington and Ellesmere Port
- In office 3 May 1979 – 13 May 1983
- Preceded by: Alfred Bates
- Succeeded by: Constituency abolished

Personal details
- Born: George Barrington Porter; 11 June 1939 Birkenhead, England
- Died: 3 November 1996 (aged 57) London, England
- Party: Conservative
- Spouse: Susan James (m. 1965; sep. 1989)
- Children: 5
- Education: University College, Oxford (BA)
- Profession: Solicitor

George Barrington "Barry" Porter (11 June 1939 – 3 November 1996) was a British lawyer and Conservative Party politician who was the MP for Bebington and Ellesmere Port from 1979 to 1983, and then for Wirral South from 1983 until his death.

== Early life ==
A native of Birkenhead, Porter was educated at Birkenhead School and went on to University College, Oxford, where he earned a degree in philosophy, politics and economics. He became a solicitor, working as a partner and later a consultant at Fanshaw Porter & Hazlehurst Solicitors in Birkenhead.

== Political career ==
Porter was elected to the Birkenhead Borough Council in 1967, which was subsumed into the Wirral Council after 1974. He remained a councillor until 1979.

=== Member of Parliament ===
Porter contested a number of parliamentary constituencies before he found success. He was the Conservative candidate at a by-election for Liverpool Scotland in 1971, Newton in the February 1974 general election, and Chorley in October 1974. Ahead of the 1979 general election, he unsuccessfully sought selection in the safe Conservative seat of Morecambe and Lonsdale. Instead, he was elected in 1979 as the MP for Bebington and Ellesmere Port. After boundary changes for the 1983 election, he was returned for the new constituency of Wirral South.

The Times said about Porter's politics:

His vigorous right-wing populism—it was characteristic that he advocated both cricket and rugby tours of South Africa while apartheid was still in force—did not find an entirely comfortable home at Westminster even under Margaret Thatcher. Although he started off by admiring her, he came to feel it was time for her to "hang up her boots", and in 1990 he emerged as one of Michael Heseltine's more supervising supporters.

Porter believed that his role in Thatcher's downfall would end his political career, and there was an effort to deselect him ahead of the 1992 general election, but it was unsuccessful.

Porter was a member of the Transport Select Committee from 1979 to 1983. In 1985, he joined the Trade and Industry Select Committee. In 1980, he was mailed a letter bomb after speaking out against the Provisional Irish Republican Army and Sinn Féin during a parliamentary debate, but it was intercepted before delivery.

== Personal life and death ==
Porter married Susan James in 1965, and they had five children. His wife worked as his secretary in the Commons, which she continued to do even after they separated in 1989.

Porter, who was described as a heavy smoker and "sometimes hard-drink[er]", died from throat cancer in London on 3 November 1996, at the age of 57. His death eliminated the majority of one enjoyed by the government of John Major in the House of Commons, and the consequent February 1997 by-election was won by Labour's Ben Chapman.

== Legacy ==
A caricature of Porter hangs in the lounge bar of the Cask and Glass Public House in Victoria, London.

Parliament of the United Kingdom
Preceded by Alfred Bates	Member of Parliament for Bebington and Ellesmere Port; 1979–1983	Constituency abolished
New constituency	Member of Parliament for Wirral South; 1983–1996	Succeeded by Ben Chapman
