= Edwin Brooks =

Welsh politician (born 1929)

Member of Parliament for Bebington
- In office 31 March 1966 – 29 May 1970
- Preceded by: Geoffrey Howe
- Succeeded by: Eric Cockeram

Personal details
- Born: 1 December 1929 (age 96) Wales
- Party: Labour
- Children: 5
- Education: St John's College, Cambridge
- Occupation: Academic, politician

Edwin Brooks (born 1 December 1929) is a British-born academic who has been a member of Parliament (MP) in England, and a local politician in both England and Australia.

== Early life ==
Brooks was born in South Wales and went to Barry Grammar School. His National Service was spent in Singapore, after which he went to St John's College, Cambridge. After an undergraduate degree he also took his PhD there. He became a Lecturer in Geography at Liverpool University in 1954.

== Political career ==
In 1958, Brooks was elected to Birkenhead County Borough Council as a Labour Party member. At the 1964 general election he was Labour candidate for the Bebington constituency on the Wirral Peninsula in Cheshire, losing to future Chancellor of the Exchequer and Foreign Secretary Geoffrey Howe. Brooks defeated Howe in the 1966 general election.

Once in Parliament, Brooks broke the Labour whip to support an amendment to the 1967 budget to relieve charities of Purchase Tax on goods they bought to further their objects; early the next year he supported amendments to soften the Commonwealth Immigrants Bill. He opposed the government's attempt to negotiate a settlement with Rhodesia. He also wanted all hereditary peers removed from the House of Lords, and called for a negotiated settlement to the Vietnam War.

Brooks was also successful in getting the 1967 NHS Family Planning Act passed as a private members Bill. This enabled local health authority-funded family health clinics to give contraceptive advice to unmarried women, on both medical and social grounds. He identified a social problem whereby low income groups risked financial difficulties from having more children than they could afford.

Brooks lost his seat in 1970.

== Academic career ==
Having lost his parliamentary seat in the 1970 UK general election, Brooks returned to Liverpool University. Two years later he was promoted to Senior Lecturer and he was Dean of College Studies from 1975 to 1977.

In 1977, he was appointed Dean of Business and Liberal Studies at Riverina College of Advanced Education, Wagga Wagga, New South Wales, and emigrated to Australia with his family. From 1982 to 1988 he was Dean of Commerce of the merged Riverina-Murray Institute of Higher Education, part of the Charles Sturt University. On retirement he was appointed Dean Emeritus. One of the University buildings has been named after him.

He co-founded Wagga Ratepayers Association, and is active in civic life in the town. He was President of Wagga Wagga Chamber of Commerce from 1988 to 1990.

Brooks is still relied upon by many members of the community to comment on issues of national and local importance.

== Personal life ==
Brooks is married to Wendy. The couple met in Liverpool. While living in England, she served as a juvenile court magistrate. Brooks has five children: Aldric (deceased), Martin, Timothy, Benjamin and Victoria. His daughter Victoria was the 2004 Federal Labor candidate for the seat of Riverina.

== Sources ==
- Philip Norton, "Dissension in the House of Commons 1945-74" (Macmillan, 1975)
- M. Stenton and S. Lees, "Who's Who of British MPs", Vol. IV (Harvester Press, 1981)
- Local newspaper column by Edwin Brooks.

Parliament of the United Kingdom
Preceded by Geoffrey Howe	Member of Parliament for Bebington; 1966–1970	Succeeded by Eric Cockeram
