= Justin Madders =

British politician (born 1972)

Justin Madders MP
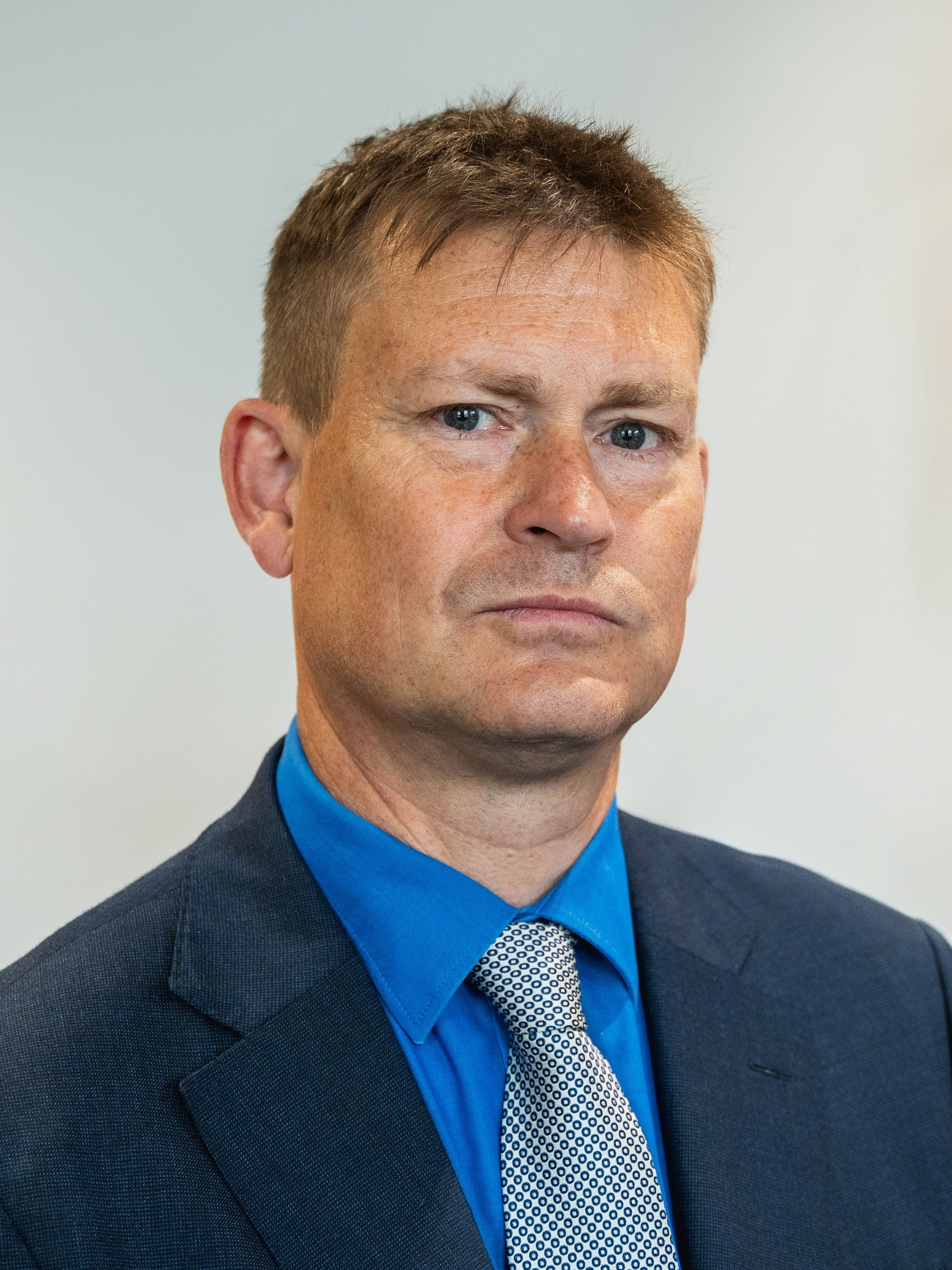
- Official portrait, 2024

Parliamentary Under-Secretary of State for Roads
- Incumbent
- Assumed office 22 July 2026
- Prime Minister: Andy Burnham
- Preceded by: Simon Lightwood

Parliamentary Under-Secretary of State for Employment Rights, Competition and Markets
- In office 9 July 2024 – 7 September 2025
- Prime Minister: Keir Starmer
- Preceded by: Kevin Hollinrake
- Succeeded by: Kate Dearden
Shadow junior portfolios
2021–2024	Business, Employment Rights and Levelling Up (Note: Employment Rights (2021 to 2023))
2020–2021	Secondary Care, Workforce and Patient Health
2018–2019	Business, Energy and Industrial Strategy
2015–2019	Health and Social Care

Member of Parliament for Ellesmere Port and Bromborough Ellesmere Port and Neston (2015–2024)
- Incumbent
- Assumed office 7 May 2015
- Preceded by: Andrew Miller
- Majority: 16,908 (40.3%)

Personal details
- Born: 22 November 1972 (age 53)
- Party: Labour
- Education: University of Sheffield
- Website: Official website

Justin Piers Richard Madders (born 22 November 1972) is a British Labour Party politician who has been the Member of Parliament (MP) for Ellesmere Port and Bromborough, previously Ellesmere Port and Neston, since 2015. He has served as Parliamentary Under-Secretary of State for Transport since July 2026, having also served as Parliamentary Under-Secretary of State for Employment Rights, Competition and Markets from July 2024 to September 2025.

== Early life and career ==
Justin Madders was born on 22 November 1972. He studied law at the University of Sheffield and worked as a solicitor, specialising in employment law, before entering politics.

Before his election to Parliament, Madders was the leader of the Labour opposition on Cheshire West and Chester Council and leader of Ellesmere Port and Neston Borough Council.

== Parliamentary career ==
At the 2005 general election, Madders stood as the Labour candidate in Tatton, coming second with 23.5% of the vote behind the incumbent Conservative MP George Osborne.

Madders was elected to Parliament at the 2015 general election as MP for Ellesmere Port and Neston with 47.8% of the vote and a majority of 6,275.

In September 2015, Madders was appointed Shadow Minister for Secondary Care, Workforce and Patient Health. He remained in this position until March 2019, when he resigned from his frontbench position, after defying the Labour whip in a vote on a second Brexit referendum.

He supported Owen Smith in the failed attempt to replace Jeremy Corbyn in the 2016 Labour leadership election.

At the snap 2017 general election, Madders was re-elected as MP for Ellesmere Port and Neston with an increased vote share of 59.2% and an increased majority of 11,390.

Madders was appointed the Shadow Minister for Business, Employment Rights and Levelling Up in July 2018, before also resigning this post in March 2019.

Madders was again re-elected at the 2019 general election, with a decreased vote share of 53.3% and a decreased majority of 8,764.

In April 2020, Madders was re-appointed as the Shadow Minister for Secondary Care, Workforce and Patient Health by the new Labour leader Keir Starmer. He left this post in December 2021, when he was appointed as the Shadow Minister for Business, Employment Rights and Levelling Up.

Due to the 2023 review of Westminster constituencies, Madders' constituency of Ellesmere Port and Neston was abolished, and replaced with Ellesmere Port and Bromborough. At the 2024 general election, Madders was elected to Parliament as MP for Ellesmere Port and Bromborough with 57.6% of the vote and a majority of 16,908.

Madders was appointed to the Starmer ministry in July 2024 as Parliamentary Under-Secretary of State for Employment Rights, Competition and Markets. He left government at the 2025 British cabinet reshuffle, but returned to government during the formation of the Burnham ministry as Parliamentary Under-Secretary of State for Roads.

== Personal life ==
Madders is married and has three children.

== Notes ==
Parliament of the United Kingdom
Preceded by Andrew Miller	Member of Parliament for Ellesmere Port and Neston; 2015–2024	Constituency abolished
New constituency	Member of Parliament for Ellesmere Port and Bromborough; 2024–present	Incumbent
