= Christopher Gill =

British politician (born 1936)

Christopher Gill RD
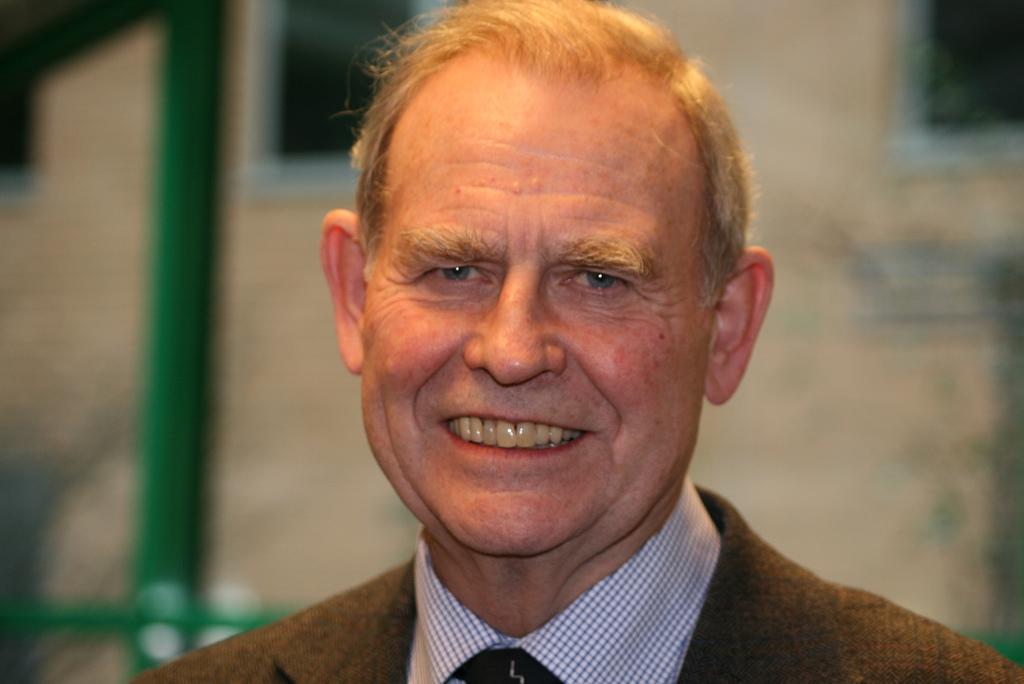
- Gill in 2010

Member of Parliament for Ludlow
- In office 11 June 1987 – 14 May 2001
- Preceded by: Eric Cockeram
- Succeeded by: Matthew Green

Personal details
- Born: Christopher John Fred Gill; 28 October 1936 (age 89) Wolverhampton, England
- Party: UKIP (2006–present); Conservative (until 2001)

Christopher John Fred Gill RD (born 28 October 1936) is a British politician, and a former member of the National Executive Committee of the UK Independence Party (UKIP). He is the president of The Freedom Association (TFA). A former Conservative Party Member of Parliament, he was one of the Maastricht Rebels of the mid-1990s.

== Biography ==
Gill was born in Wolverhampton, where he later became a local councillor, and was educated locally at Birchfield Preparatory School, then at Shrewsbury School. His national service was in the Royal Navy, serving aboard HMS Modeste and HMS Birmingham. He retired as Chairman of his family's sausage-making business, F.A. Gill Ltd., in 2006.

Gill served as Conservative MP for Ludlow from 1987 to 2001, when he stepped down. He was known as the "Butcher from Ludlow" because of his family company being a meat processing firm. He had the Conservative whip withdrawn over the EC Finance Bill on 28 November 1994.

As a constituency MP, Gill fought against the closure of local cottage hospitals. Gill was also known for being an expert on areas of European Union legislation, and he was a notable Eurosceptic.

Shortly before leaving Parliament in 2001, he resigned his membership of the Conservatives. In 2006, Gill announced that he had joined the UK Independence Party (UKIP), having endorsed the party's policies at the 2004 European Parliament election. He was an elected member of UKIP's National Executive Committee from 2007 until 2010. He stood for Ludlow as a UKIP candidate at the 2010 general election, coming fourth with 2,127 votes, 4.4% of the total, losing his deposit but almost tripling the 2005 vote. At the time of the election, Gill stated that his reasoning for standing was: "I am standing against 'call me Dave's' Tories because I cannot tolerate their utter contempt for the concerns of voters on matters of immigration, economy, individual liberty and the broken promise of a referendum on the Lisbon Treaty."

Gill was chairman of The Freedom Association from 2001, before becoming its president in 2007.

== Publications ==
- Whip's Nightmare: Diary of a Maastricht Rebel. The Memoir Club. 2003. ISBN 978-1841040868.
- Cracking the Whip. Bretwalda Books. 13 December 2012. ISBN 978-1909099067.

Parliament of the United Kingdom
| Preceded by Eric Cockeram | Member of Parliament for Ludlow; 1987–2001 | Succeeded by Matthew Green |
