= 1997 Wirral South by-election =

UK parliamentary by-election

- 27 February 1997
- Turnout: 71.5%
	First party	Second party	Third party
Candidate	Ben Chapman	Leslie Byrom	Flo Clucas
Party	Labour	Conservative	Liberal Democrats
Popular vote	22,767	14,879	4,357
Percentage	52.6%	34.4%	10.1%
Swing	▲18.0 pp	▼16.5 pp	▼3.0 pp
MP before election
Barry Porter
Conservative
Elected MP
Ben Chapman
Labour

A by-election for the United Kingdom parliamentary constituency of Wirral South was held on 27 February 1997 following the death of Conservative Party Member of Parliament (MP) Barry Porter. It was won by Labour's Ben Chapman.

This was the final by-election in a run of significant Conservative losses following a period of dissatisfaction with the Major years, and the last held during the 1992–1997 Parliament. This was also the last Conservative loss to Labour in a by-election until 2012. Labour held this seat from the by-election until its dissolution in 2024.

== Result ==
Wirral South by-election, 1997
Party	Candidate	Votes	%	±%
Labour	Ben Chapman	22,767	52.6	+18.0
Conservative	Leslie Byrom	14,879	34.4	−16.5
Liberal Democrats	Flo Clucas	4,357	10.1	−3.0
UKIP	Richard North	410	0.9	New
Independent	Harold Bence	184	0.4	New
Socialist Labour	Michael Cullen	156	0.4	New
Disillusioned Conservative	Phillip Gott	148	0.3	New
Independent	Roger Taylor	132	0.3	New
Independent - anti tobacco donation	Anthony Samuelson	124	0.3	New
Natural Law	Geoffery Mead	52	0.1	−0.2
21st Century Foresters	Colin Palmer	44	0.1	New
Independent - Thalidomide Action Group	Frederick Astbury	40	0.1	New
Majority		7,888	18.2	N/A
Turnout		43,293	71.5	−10.8
Labour gain from Conservative		Swing	+17.25	

== Previous result ==
General election 1992: Wirral South
Party	Candidate	Votes	%	±%
Conservative	Barry Porter	25,590	50.8	+0.6
Labour	Helen Southworth	17,407	34.6	+6.6
Liberal Democrats	Edward T. Cunniffe	6,581	13.1	−8.7
Green	Nigel Birchenough	584	1.2	New
Natural Law	George Griffiths	182	0.4	New
Majority		8,183	16.2	−5.8
Turnout		50,344	82.3	+2.9
Conservative hold		Swing	−3.0	

== See also ==
- List of United Kingdom by-elections
- List of parliamentary constituencies in Merseyside
