= Matthew Green (British politician) =

British politician

Member of Parliament for Ludlow
- In office 7 June 2001 – 11 April 2005
- Preceded by: Christopher Gill
- Succeeded by: Philip Dunne

Personal details
- Born: 12 April 1970 (age 56) Shropshire, England
- Party: Liberal Democrat
- Education: University of Birmingham

Matthew Roger Green (born 12 April 1970) is a British politician. He was the Liberal Democrat Member of Parliament for Ludlow from 2001 to 2005, and his party's spokesman on the Office of the Deputy Prime Minister.

== Parliamentary career ==
He contested Wolverhampton South West in 1997 and was a councillor prior to his election to parliament.

Green was elected MP for Ludlow at the 2001 United Kingdom general election, with a majority of 1,630. He was the first Liberal to represent Ludlow since 1886. Green was appointed the party's spokesman on youth affairs in November 2001, and was spokesman on the Office of the Deputy Prime Minister between 2002 and 2003. He lost his seat to the Conservative, Philip Dunne, in the 2005 general election.

On 25 February 2006, he was selected as the Lib Dem candidate for Ludlow at the next general election but in May 2007 Green stood down as candidate owing to the rapid growth of his new business, Green Planning Solutions LLP. His brother Nathaniel Green was the Lib Dem candidate for Shrewsbury and Atcham at the 2019 general election.

== Later life ==
His company, Green Planning Studio Ltd, act as agents for appellants in public appeals, some of which can be high profile. Matthew Green is often a professional planning witness in these cases. The appeals take place after applications for planning permission have been refused by Councils, or after an enforcement notice has been issued. Green Planning Studio’s clients include Councils; applicants for planning permission ranging from individual householders seeking extensions to larger scale housing developers; and third parties who usually are objecting to a proposed development. The company's website claims: "Particular skills and success for projects in the countryside, Green Belt, Areas of Outstanding Natural Beauty and the historic environment". Some of Green Planning Studio’s clients are from the travelling community and their applications and subsequent appeals can attract significant press attention even for small scale developments.

Green remained involved in politics after leaving Parliament, being mentioned by the Shropshire Star as a potential Liberal Democrat candidate in the 2021 North Shropshire by-election. In 2024, Green stood as the Liberal Democrat candidate in the new constituency of South Shropshire (this seat expands the borders of the old Ludlow constituency) and came second.

== Personal life ==
Green was born in Shropshire, living in Ratlinghope and Bishop's Castle before moving to Much Wenlock by the time of his election. Prior to entering parliament he worked as a PR and media advisor.

Parliament of the United Kingdom
Preceded by Christopher Gill	Member of Parliament for Ludlow; 2001–2005	Succeeded by Philip Dunne
