= Andrew Miller (British politician) =

British politician (1949–2019)

- Miller as an MP

Member of Parliament for Ellesmere Port and Neston
- In office 9 April 1992 – 30 March 2015
- Preceded by: Mike Woodcock
- Succeeded by: Justin Madders
- Majority: 4,331 (9.8%)

Personal details
- Born: Andrew Peter Miller; 23 March 1949 Isleworth, Middlesex, England
- Died: 24 December 2019 (aged 70) Clatterbridge, Wirral, England
- Party: Labour
- Spouse: Fran
- Children: 3
- Education: Hayling Island Secondary School; Highbury Technical College
- Alma mater: London School of Economics; Royal College of Defence Studies; Portsmouth Polytechnic
- Profession: Scientist; politician
- Website: Official website

Andrew Peter Miller (23 March 1949 – 24 December 2019) was a British Labour politician and scientist who served as Member of Parliament (MP) for Ellesmere Port and Neston from 1992 to 2015.

== Early life ==
Born in Isleworth, Middlesex, Miller was educated in Malta before attending the Hayling Island Secondary School (now known as The Hayling College) in Hampshire and the Highbury Technical College (now known as Highbury College) on Dovercourt Road in Portsmouth. He studied at the London School of Economics, where he was awarded a diploma in industrial relations in 1977. He was an alumnus of the Royal College of Defence Studies. He worked initially as a laboratory technician at the Department of Geology at Portsmouth Polytechnic from 1967 and, from 1977, was an official of the MSF trade union.

== Parliamentary career ==
Miller was first elected to the House of Commons at the 1992 general election, when he won Ellesmere Port and Neston for Labour from the Conservatives, the sitting MP, Mike Woodcock, retiring that year. He was re-elected four times over the years. In Parliament, Miller served on numerous select committees. In 2005 he was confirmed as chairman of the House of Commons Regulatory Reform Committee. He served for four years from 2001 to the ministers at the Department of Trade and Industry, and was the first chair of the House of Commons Science and Technology Select Committee to be elected by all members of the House; he served in the position for more than ten years.

In 1997 he championed the case of Louise Woodward, a nanny convicted of manslaughter in Newton, Massachusetts.

He worked with Maltese political parties to facilitate the country's accession to the European Union in 2004.

In December 2007, Miller introduced a Private Member's Bill based on the Agency Workers Directive and known officially as the Temporary and Agency Workers (Equal Treatment) Bill 2008 to give temporary and agency workers the same rights as direct workers.

He announced on 10 December 2013 that he would not stand at the next general election.

== Career after Parliament ==
After leaving Parliament, Miller continued to work in science policy. He chaired the University of Chester, Thornton Science Park Advisory Board and the Engagement Advisory Board, joined the University Council and was a director of Thornton research. He was the chair of the Grantham Institute for Sustainable Futures engagement board. He was a board member of the UK Research Integrity Office, a trustee of Newton's Apple, and a member of the Royal Society, Science Policy Expert Advisory Committee.

The Science Council recognised him as "one of the UK's 100 leading practising scientists" in 2014. He was awarded an honorary DSc by the University of Chester in November 2014 and an Honorary Fellowship at Liverpool John Moores University in July 2015.

== Personal life ==
Miller and his wife Fran had three children.

He died on 24 December 2019, aged 70.

Parliament of the United Kingdom
| Preceded by Mike Woodcock | Member of Parliament for Ellesmere Port and Neston; 1992–2015 | Succeeded by Justin Madders |
