= Strawberry Park, Cheshire =

Suburb of Ellesmere Port, Cheshire, England

Coordinates: 53.258°N 2.92°W

Strawberry Park
- Location within Cheshire
- OS grid reference: SJ386734
- Unitary authority: Cheshire West and Chester
- Ceremonial county: Cheshire
- Region: North West
- Country: England
- Sovereign state: United Kingdom
- Post town: Ellesmere Port
- Postcode district: CH66
- Dialling code: 0151
- Police: Cheshire
- Fire: Cheshire
- Ambulance: North West
- UK Parliament: Ellesmere Port and Neston

Strawberry Park and Strawberry Fields are suburbs in the town of Ellesmere Port, Cheshire West and Chester. They are located to the south of Hope Farm and to the west of Backford Cross.
