= Bebington (constituency) =

Parliamentary constituency in the United Kingdom, 1950–1974

- Former borough constituency for the House of Commons

1950–February 1974
- Created from: Birkenhead East and Wirral
- Replaced by: Bebington and Ellesmere Port, Birkenhead and Wirral

Bebington was a parliamentary constituency in the United Kingdom, which existed from 1950 to 1974. The constituency was centred on the town of Bebington on the Wirral Peninsula, England.

== History ==
Bebington was created by the Representation of the People Act 1948 for the 1950 general election, ceasing to exist with the implementation of the boundary changes brought in for the February 1974 general election.

== Boundaries ==
The Borough of Bebington, and the County Borough of Birkenhead wards of Bebington, Devonshire, Egerton, Mersey, and Prenton.

The Borough of Bebington and the Prenton ward of the County Borough of Birkenhead had previously been part of the Wirral constituency, with remaining Birkenhead wards being added from the former Birkenhead East constituency.

On abolition in 1974, the Borough of Bebington became part of the new constituency of Bebington and Ellesmere Port, the Prenton ward was returned to Wirral and the remaining wards added to the redrawn Birkenhead constituency.

== Members of Parliament ==
Election	Member	Party
1950	Hendrie Oakshott	Conservative
1964	Geoffrey Howe	Conservative
1966	Edwin Brooks	Labour
1970	Eric Cockeram	Conservative
Feb 1974	constituency abolished: see Bebington and Ellesmere Port	

== Elections ==
=== Elections in the 1950s ===
General election 1950: Bebington
Party	Candidate	Votes	%
Conservative	Hendrie Oakshott	25,309	43.8
Labour	Frank Soskice	22,090	38.3
Liberal	Graham White	10,324	17.9
Majority		3,219	5.5
Turnout		57,723	87.2
Registered electors			
Conservative win (new seat)			

General election 1951: Bebington
Party	Candidate	Votes	%	±%
Conservative	Hendrie Oakshott	30,611	53.44	
Labour Co-op	Edward W. Harby	22,190	38.74	
Liberal	Thomas Mercer Banks	4,477	7.82	
Majority		8,421	14.70	
Turnout		57,278	85.82	
Registered electors				
Conservative hold		Swing		

General election 1955: Bebington
Party	Candidate	Votes	%	±%
Conservative	Hendrie Oakshott	31,700	58.73	
Labour	Thomas H. Hockton	22,277	41.27	
Majority		9,423	17.46	
Turnout		53,977	79.16	
Registered electors				
Conservative hold		Swing		

General election 1959: Bebington
Party	Candidate	Votes	%	±%
Conservative	Hendrie Oakshott	33,705	58.57	
Labour	Gordon Oakes	23,844	41.43	
Majority		9,861	17.13	
Turnout		57,549	81.78	
Registered electors				
Conservative hold		Swing		

=== Elections in the 1960s ===
General election 1964: Bebington
Party	Candidate	Votes	%	±%
Conservative	Geoffrey Howe	26,943	45.33	
Labour	Edwin Brooks	24,734	41.61	
Liberal	Michael J G Tompkins	7,765	13.06	New
Majority		2,209	3.72	
Turnout		59,442	80.90	
Registered electors				
Conservative hold		Swing		

General election 1966: Bebington
Party	Candidate	Votes	%	±%
Labour	Edwin Brooks	30,545	51.99	+10.38
Conservative	Geoffrey Howe	28,208	48.01	+2.68
Majority		2,337	3.98	N/A
Turnout		58,753	79.77	−1.13
Registered electors				
Labour gain from Conservative		Swing	+3.85	

=== Elections in the 1970s ===
General election 1970: Bebington
Party	Candidate	Votes	%	±%
Conservative	Eric Cockeram	31,260	50.59	+2.58
Labour	Edwin Brooks	30,535	49.41	−2.58
Majority		725	1.17	N/A
Turnout		61,795	75.44	−4.33
Registered electors				
Conservative gain from Labour		Swing	+2.58	

== See also ==
- Bebington and Ellesmere Port (UK Parliament constituency)
- History of parliamentary constituencies and boundaries in Cheshire

== Sources ==
- Leigh Rayment's Historical List of MPs – Constituencies beginning with "B" (part 1)
- Election results, 1950 - 1979
