= Wirral South =

UK Parliament constituency (1983–2024)

Coordinates: 53.3342°N 3.0334°W

- Former county constituency for the House of Commons
- Boundary of Wirral South in Merseyside

- Location of Merseyside within England
- County: Merseyside
- Electorate: 56,238 (December 2010)
- Major settlements: Heswall, Bebington

1983–2024
- Seats: One
- Created from: Wirral; Bebington & Ellesmere Port
- Replaced by: Ellesmere Port & Bromborough, Wirral West, Birkenhead

Wirral South was a constituency (Note: A county constituency (for the purposes of election expenses and type of returning officer)) in Merseyside in the House of Commons of the UK Parliament. It was represented from 1997 until 2024 by members of the Labour Party. (Note: As with all constituencies, the constituency elects one Member of Parliament (MP) by the first past the post system of election at least every five years.)

Further to the completion of the 2023 review of Westminster constituencies, the seat was abolished and its area split between three other constituencies, which were first contested at the 2024 general election.

== Constituency profile ==
Wirral South covered the central part of the Wirral peninsula including most of Heswall, Bebington and Bromborough. Wages and house prices are higher than the averages for the North West. Electoral Calculus describes the demographic as "Centrist", reflecting average views on the left-right and liberal-conservative scales.

== History ==
In 1983, Wirral South arose for election following the national boundary review by taking over parts of two seats that were abolished to create it: Wirral and Bebington and Ellesmere Port, held by the Conservative Party since 1923 and 1979 respectively.

Political history

Barry Porter (Con) won the seat the first time when it was fought and at the next two general elections. He had ousted the Labour party candidate from Bebington and Ellesmere Port in 1979 which he held until the election in 1983. Following the death of Porter in late 1996, a by-election was held in February 1997, the last by-election of that Parliament, held a matter of weeks before the general election was called. It was won by Ben Chapman (Lab), who held the seat until retiring following controversy over his expenses. Labour narrowly managed to hold on in the 2010 general election, electing Alison McGovern. Since then it has consistently shifted towards Labour, she increased her majority to 4,599 in the 2015 election. She was re-elected in 2017 with a majority of 8,323, an increase of 7% over 2015, the biggest majority Labour has ever held in the seat and the biggest majority for any party in Wirral South since 1987. In 2019 she won Re-Election by a slightly narrower 14% margin.

=== 2015 general election ===
The terms of the Fixed-term Parliaments Act 2011 mandated that the election was held on 7 May 2015. Alison McGovern was the sitting Member of Parliament for the Labour Party. The Conservative Party selected John Bell. Bell had previously stood for election in Clwyd South (2010) and Delyn (2005). He had also stood twice to be a Welsh Assembly Member. He stood in a local council by-election in 2011, for Wrexham County Council.

== Boundaries ==
Map of boundaries 1983-2024

Since its creation in 1983, the constituency has consisted of the Metropolitan Borough of Wirral wards of Bebington, Bromborough, Clatterbridge, Eastham, and Heswall. The constituency is one of four covering the Metropolitan Borough of Wirral in Merseyside.

=== Abolition ===
Further to the completion of the 2023 Periodic Review of Westminster constituencies, the seat was abolished prior to the 2024 general election, with its contents distributed to three neighbouring constituencies:

- 43.1% of the electorate (Bromborough and Eastham wards) to the new seat of Ellesmere Port and Bromborough
- 36.6% of the electorate (Clatterbridge and Heswall) wards to Wirral West
- 20.3% of the electorate (Bebington ward) to Birkenhead

== Members of Parliament ==
| Election | Member | Party | Notes |
|---|---|---|---|
| 1983 | Barry Porter | Conservative | MP for Bebington and Ellesmere Port (1979–83). Died in office in November 1996. |
| 1997 by-election | Ben Chapman | Labour | |
| 2010 | Alison McGovern | Labour | |

== Elections ==
=== Elections in the 1980s ===
General election 1983: Wirral South
| Party | Candidate | Votes | % |
|---|---|---|---|
| Conservative | Barry Porter | 24,766 | 53.7 |
| SDP | Peter Hollingworth | 10,928 | 23.7 |
| Labour | Keith Rimmer | 10,411 | 22.6 |
| Majority | | 13,838 | 30.0 |
| Turnout | | 46,105 | 75.8 |
| Registered electors | | 60,864 | |
| Conservative win (new seat) | | | |

General election 1987: Wirral South
| Party | Candidate | Votes | % | ±% |
|---|---|---|---|---|
| Conservative | Barry Porter | 24,821 | 50.2 | ▼3.5 |
| Labour | John Swarbrooke | 13,858 | 28.0 | ▲5.4 |
| Liberal | Philip Gilchrist | 10,779 | 21.8 | ▼1.9 |
| Majority | | 10,963 | 22.2 | ▼7.8 |
| Turnout | | 49,458 | 79.4 | ▲3.6 |
| Registered electors | | 62,251 | | ▲2.3 |
| Conservative hold | | Swing | ▼4.5 | |

=== Elections in the 1990s ===
General election 1992: Wirral South
| Party | Candidate | Votes | % | ±% |
|---|---|---|---|---|
| Conservative | Barry Porter | 25,590 | 50.8 | ▲0.6 |
| Labour | Helen Southworth | 17,407 | 34.6 | ▲6.6 |
| Liberal Democrats | Edward Cunniffe | 6,581 | 13.1 | ▼8.7 |
| Green | Nigel Birchenough | 584 | 1.2 | New |
| Natural Law | George Griffiths | 182 | 0.4 | New |
| Majority | | 8,183 | 16.2 | ▼6.0 |
| Turnout | | 50,344 | 82.4 | ▲3.0 |
| Registered electors | | 61,116 | | ▼1.8 |
| Conservative hold | | Swing | ▼3.0 | |

1992 notional result
| Party | Vote | % |
|---|---|---|
| Conservative | 25,550 | 50.8 |
| Labour | 17,382 | 34.6 |
| Liberal Democrats | 6,572 | 13.1 |
| Others | 765 | 1.5 |
| Turnout | 50,269 | 80.9 |
| Electorate | 62,103 | |

By-election 1997: Wirral South
| Party | Candidate | Votes | % | ±% |
|---|---|---|---|---|
| Labour | Ben Chapman | 22,767 | 52.6 | ▲18.0 |
| Conservative | Leslie Byrom | 14,879 | 34.4 | ▼16.4 |
| Liberal Democrats | Flo Clucas | 4,357 | 10.1 | ▼3.0 |
| UKIP | Richard North | 410 | 0.9 | New |
| Independent | Harold Bence | 184 | 0.4 | New |
| Socialist Labour | Michael Cullen | 156 | 0.4 | New |
| Ind. Conservative | Phillip Gott | 148 | 0.3 | New |
| Independent | Roger Taylor | 132 | 0.3 | New |
| Independent | S. Anthony | 124 | 0.3 | New |
| Natural Law | Geoffery Mead | 52 | 0.1 | ▼0.3 |
| 21st Century Conservatives | Colin Palmer | 44 | 0.1 | New |
| Independent | Frederick Astbury | 40 | 0.1 | New |
| Majority | | 7,888 | 18.2 | N/A |
| Turnout | | 43,293 | 71.5 | ▼10.9 |
| Registered electors | | 60,512 | | ▼1.0 |
| Labour gain from Conservative | | Swing | ▲17.25 | |

General election 1997: Wirral South
| Party | Candidate | Votes | % | ±% |
|---|---|---|---|---|
| Labour | Ben Chapman | 24,499 | 50.9 | ▲16.3 |
| Conservative | Les Byrom | 17,495 | 36.4 | ▼14.4 |
| Liberal Democrats | Philip Gilchrist | 5,018 | 10.4 | ▼2.7 |
| Referendum | Donald Wilcox | 768 | 1.6 | New |
| ProLife Alliance | Jane Nielsen | 264 | 0.5 | New |
| Natural Law | Geoffrey Mead | 51 | 0.1 | ▼0.3 |
| Majority | | 7,004 | 14.5 | N/A |
| Turnout | | 48,095 | 81.0 | ▼1.4 |
| Registered electors | | 59,372 | | ▼2.9 |
| Labour gain from Conservative | | Swing | ▲15.4 | |

=== Elections in the 2000s ===
General election 2001: Wirral South
| Party | Candidate | Votes | % | ±% |
|---|---|---|---|---|
| Labour | Ben Chapman | 18,890 | 47.4 | ▼3.5 |
| Conservative | Tony Millard | 13,841 | 34.8 | ▼1.6 |
| Liberal Democrats | Philip Gilchrist | 7,087 | 17.8 | ▲7.4 |
| Majority | | 5,049 | 12.6 | ▼1.9 |
| Turnout | | 39,818 | 65.6 | ▼15.4 |
| Registered electors | | 60,653 | | ▲2.2 |
| Labour hold | | Swing | ▼1.0 | |

General election 2005: Wirral South
| Party | Candidate | Votes | % | ±% |
|---|---|---|---|---|
| Labour | Ben Chapman | 16,892 | 42.5 | ▼4.9 |
| Conservative | Carl Cross | 13,168 | 33.2 | ▼1.6 |
| Liberal Democrats | Simon Holbrook | 8,568 | 21.6 | ▲3.8 |
| UKIP | David Scott | 616 | 1.6 | New |
| Independent | Laurence Jones | 460 | 1.2 | New |
| Majority | | 3,724 | 9.4 | ▼3.2 |
| Turnout | | 39,704 | 67.5 | ▲1.9 |
| Registered electors | | 58,834 | | ▼3.0 |
| Labour hold | | Swing | ▼1.7 | |

=== Elections in the 2010s ===
General election 2010: Wirral South
| Party | Candidate | Votes | % | ±% |
|---|---|---|---|---|
| Labour | Alison McGovern | 16,276 | 40.8 | ▼1.7 |
| Conservative | Jeff Clarke | 15,745 | 39.5 | ▲6.3 |
| Liberal Democrats | Jamie Saddler | 6,611 | 16.6 | ▼5.0 |
| UKIP | David Scott | 1,274 | 3.2 | ▲1.6 |
| Majority | | 531 | 1.3 | ▼8.1 |
| Turnout | | 39,906 | 71.1 | ▲3.6 |
| Registered electors | | 56,099 | | ▼4.6 |
| Labour hold | | Swing | ▼4.0 | |

General election 2015: Wirral South
| Party | Candidate | Votes | % | ±% |
|---|---|---|---|---|
| Labour | Alison McGovern | 20,165 | 48.2 | ▲7.4 |
| Conservative | John Bell | 15,566 | 37.2 | ▼2.3 |
| UKIP | David Scott | 3,737 | 8.9 | ▲5.7 |
| Liberal Democrats | Elizabeth Jewkes | 1,474 | 3.5 | ▼13.1 |
| Green | Paul Cartlidge | 895 | 2.1 | New |
| Majority | | 4,599 | 11.0 | ▲9.7 |
| Turnout | | 41,837 | 73.5 | ▲2.4 |
| Registered electors | | 56,956 | | ▲1.5 |
| Labour hold | | Swing | ▲4.9 | |

General election 2017: Wirral South
| Party | Candidate | Votes | % | ±% |
|---|---|---|---|---|
| Labour | Alison McGovern | 25,871 | 57.2 | ▲9.0 |
| Conservative | Adam Sykes | 17,548 | 38.8 | ▲1.6 |
| Liberal Democrats | Chris Carubia | 1,322 | 2.9 | ▼0.6 |
| Green | Mandi Roberts | 454 | 1.0 | ▼1.1 |
| Majority | | 8,323 | 18.4 | ▲7.4 |
| Turnout | | 45,195 | 78.5 | ▲5.0 |
| Registered electors | | 57,670 | | ▲1.3 |
| Labour hold | | Swing | ▲3.7 | |

General election 2019: Wirral South
| Party | Candidate | Votes | % | ±% |
|---|---|---|---|---|
| Labour | Alison McGovern | 22,284 | 51.2 | ▼6.0 |
| Conservative | Stewart Gardiner | 16,179 | 37.1 | ▼1.6 |
| Liberal Democrats | Chris Carubia | 2,917 | 6.7 | ▲3.8 |
| Brexit Party | Martin Waring | 1,219 | 2.8 | New |
| Green | Harry Gorman | 948 | 2.2 | ▲1.2 |
| Majority | | 6,105 | 14.1 | ▼4.3 |
| Turnout | | 43,547 | 76.2 | ▼2.2 |
| Registered electors | | 57,280 | | ▼0.7 |
| Labour hold | | Swing | ▼2.2 | |

== See also ==
- List of parliamentary constituencies in Merseyside
- 1997 Wirral South by-election
