= Alfred Bates =

British politician

Alfred Bates (8 June 1944 – 17 December 2013) was a British Labour Party politician.

Bates was educated at Stretford Grammar School for Boys, the University of Manchester and Corpus Christi College, Cambridge. He was a lecturer in mathematics at De La Salle College of Education in Middleton from 1967 to 1974, when he was elected to Parliament.

Having unsuccessfully fought Northwich in 1970, Bates was first elected to the House of Commons in the February 1974 general election, as Member of Parliament for Bebington and Ellesmere Port. He was re-elected at the October 1974 election, but lost his seat at the 1979 general election to the Conservative Barry Porter by 486 votes (a margin of just 0.7%). Bates served as a government whip between 1976 and 1979.

After losing his seat Bates worked for the BBC as a researcher, presenter and assistant producer before becoming an independent media consultant and then a research assistant for the Union of Shop, Distributive and Allied Workers. From 1992 to 2000 he was a member of Trafford Metropolitan Borough Council, representing Talbot ward.

== Notes ==
Parliament of the United Kingdom
| New constituency | Member of Parliament for Bebington and Ellesmere Port; 1974–1979 | Succeeded by Barry Porter |
