= Ellesmere Port and Bromborough =

UK Parliament constituency (since 2024)

- Borough constituency for the House of Commons
- Interactive map of boundaries since 2024
- Location within North West England
- County: Cheshire; Merseyside
- Electorate: 71,027 (March 2020)
- Major settlements: Ellesmere Port, Bromborough, Port Sunlight

Current constituency
- Created: 2024
- Member of Parliament: Justin Madders (Labour)
- Seats: One
- Created from: Ellesmere Port and Neston and Wirral South

Ellesmere Port and Bromborough is a constituency of the House of Commons in the UK Parliament. It was first contested at the 2024 general election. The seat is currently represented by Justin Madders of the Labour Party. Madders was MP for the predecessor seat of Ellesmere Port and Neston from 2015 to 2024.

== Constituency profile ==
Ellesmere Port and Bromborough is a constituency located in North West England. It covers the large town of Ellesmere Port in Cheshire, which has a population of around 65,000, and the smaller town of Bromborough in Merseyside, including the neighbourhoods of New Ferry, Port Sunlight and Eastham. The constituency lies on the Wirral Peninsula on the bank of the Mersey estuary. Ellesmere Port is port town with a large oil refinery and a history of industry, whilst Bromborough is a historic market town. The constituency has average levels of wealth; the southern and western suburbs of Ellesmere Port are affluent and fall within the 10% least-deprived areas in England, whilst there are high levels of deprivation in New Ferry and in the east of Ellesmere Port. House prices are lower than regional and national averages.

Residents of the constituency have average levels of education, income and professional employment compared with the rest of the country. White people made up 96% of the population at the 2021 census. At the local council level, Ellesmere Port is represented mostly by Labour Party councillors, Eastham by Liberal Democrats and Bromborough by Greens. An estimated 55% of voters in the constituency supported leaving the European Union in the 2016 referendum, marginally higher than the nationwide figure of 52%.

== Boundaries ==
Further to the 2023 review of Westminster constituencies, the composition of the constituency is as follows from the 2024 general election (as they existed on 1 December 2020):

- The Borough of Cheshire West and Chester wards of Central & Grange, Ledsham & Manor, Netherpool, Strawberry, Sutton Villages, Westminster, Whitby Groves, Whitby Park, and Wolverham.
- The Metropolitan Borough of Wirral wards of Bromborough and Eastham.

The seat covers the majority of, and replaces, the Ellesmere Port and Neston constituency, comprising the town of Ellesmere Port, with Neston being included in the new seat of Chester North and Neston. It extends northwards to include the two Wirral Borough communities of Bromborough and Eastham from the abolished constituency of Wirral South. The two parts of the constituency are not internally connected by any public road or path.

== Members of Parliament ==
Election	Member	Party
2024	Justin Madders	Labour

== Elections ==
=== Elections in the 2020s ===
General election 2024: Ellesmere Port and Bromborough
Party	Candidate	Votes	%	±%
Labour	Justin Madders	24,186	57.6	−1.7
Reform	Michael Aldred	7,278	17.3	+13.0
Conservative	Lee Evans	5,210	12.4	−14.7
Green	Harry Gorman	2,706	6.4	+4.5
Liberal Democrats	Chris Carubia	2,328	5.5	−1.9
Independent	Ruth Boulton	256	0.6	N/A
Rejected ballots		153		
Majority		16,908	40.3	+8.1
Turnout		41,964	59.3	−4.4
Registered electors		70,799		
Labour hold		Swing	−7.3	

Changes are from the notional 2019 results on the 2024 boundaries.

=== Elections in the 2010s ===
2019 notional result
Party	Vote	%
Labour	26,811	59.3
Conservative	12,234	27.1
Liberal Democrats	3,355	7.4
Brexit Party	1,957	4.3
Green	859	1.9
Turnout	45,216	63.7
Electorate	71,027	
