= Larry Siedentop =

British political philosopher (1936–2024)

Sir Larry Siedentop CBE
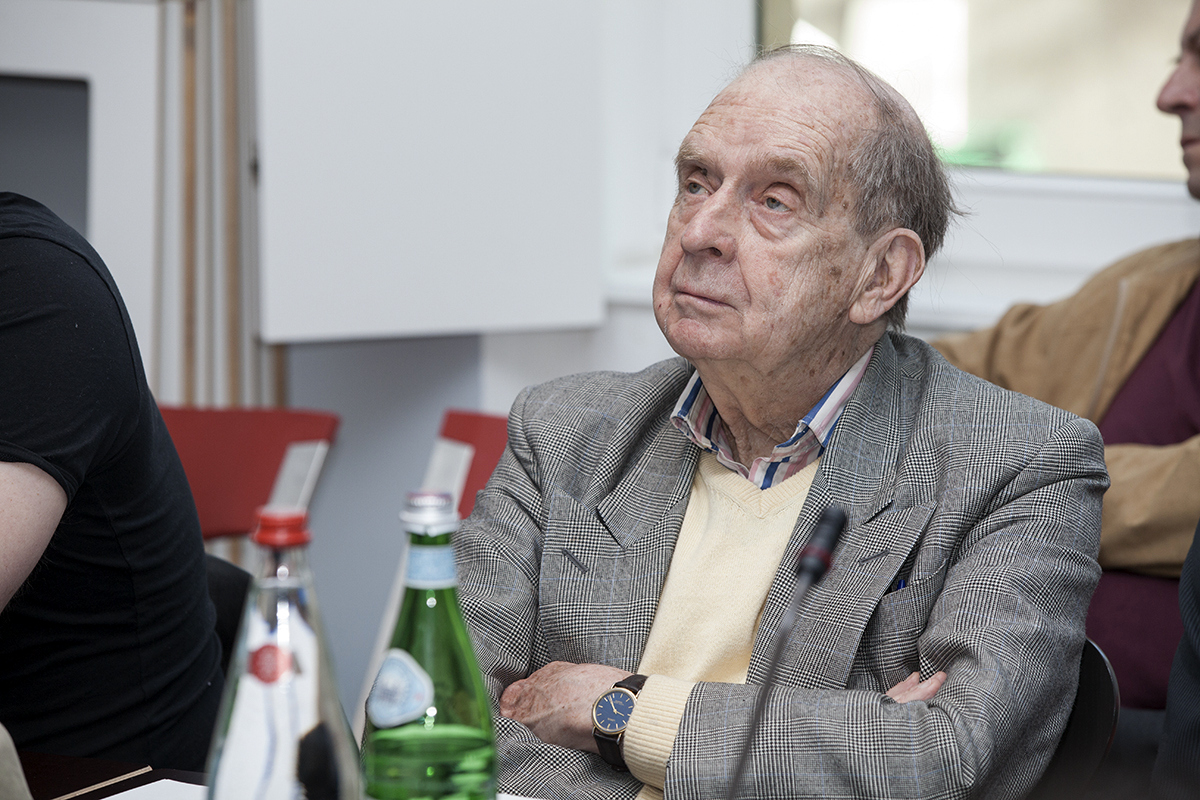
- Siedentop in 2013
- Born: Larry Alan Siedentop; 24 May 1936; Chicago, Illinois, U.S.
- Died: 13 June 2024 (aged 88)

Academic background
- Education: Hope College (BA); Harvard University (MA); Magdalen College, Oxford (DPhil)
- Thesis: The Limits of Enlightenment (1966)
- Doctoral advisor: Isaiah Berlin

Academic work
- Discipline: Philosophy
- Sub-discipline: Political philosophy
- Institutions: Nuffield College, Oxford; Keble College, Oxford
- Notable works: Democracy in Europe (2000); Inventing the Individual (2014)

Sir Larry Alan Siedentop CBE (24 May 1936 – 13 June 2024) was an American-born British political philosopher with a special interest in 19th-century French liberalism. He was the author of Democracy in Europe (2000) and Inventing the Individual (2014) and an occasional contributor to several major British daily newspapers, including the Financial Times and The Times.

== Life and career ==
Born in Chicago on 24 May 1936, Siedentop attended Hope College, a liberal arts college in Michigan affiliated with the Reformed Church in America, and Harvard University, where he received his Master of Arts degree. He then received, as a Marshall Scholar, a Doctor of Philosophy degree from the University of Oxford for a thesis on the thought of Joseph de Maistre and Maine de Biran, written at Magdalen College, Oxford, under the supervision of Isaiah Berlin.

From 1965 to 1968, Siedentop was a Research Fellow at Nuffield College, Oxford, but he spent most of his academic career as a Fellow of Keble College, Oxford, and a University Lecturer. After retiring from Oxford, Siedentop was a visiting fellow at the Netherlands Institute for Advanced Study in Wassenaar, Queen Victoria Eugenia Professor at the Complutense University of Madrid and a visiting fellow in Philosophy and Public Affairs at the University of St Andrews.

Siedentop was appointed Commander of the Order of the British Empire (CBE) in 2004 for services to political thought and higher education, and was knighted in the 2016 Birthday Honours for services to political science. He died on 13 June 2024, at the age of 88.

== Reception ==
Siedentop's third book, Inventing the Individual: The Origins of Western Liberalism (2014), was praised by both The Wall Street Journal for "attempting to trace a lost genealogy" of "modern secularism, and its freedoms, as Christianity's gift to human society", and by The Guardian as "A remarkable book that will change the way you think about our concept of ourselves."

In his lifelong work on French political liberalism, Samuel Moyn bemoans in the Boston Review that with his "conviction that radical Islam prompts the West to respond with moral clarity about what it represents" and with regret in the face of "the rise of Christian fundamentalism in the land of his birth, responsible for culture wars", Siedentop "dallies in the Middle Ages in implausible reaction to anxiety and worry, distorting the history of liberalism and omitting how much further it had to go — still has to go — to take individual freedom and equality seriously." In the end, "he has no real theory of how Christianity birthed liberalism" and Inventing the Individual, at best, "mostly amounts to an argument that, after Jesus’s message, it just took a while for liberalism to complete its metamorphosis and come out of its Christian shell."

== Selected publications ==
=== Books as author ===
- Larry Siedentop (1994). Tocqueville (Past Masters). Oxford University Press. ISBN 978-0192876904., (Google Books)
- Larry Siedentop (2001). Democracy in Europe. Penguin UK. ISBN 978-0231123778. (Google Books)
- Larry Siedentop (2014). Inventing the Individual: The Origins of Western Liberalism. Penguin UK. ISBN 978-0713996449. (Google Books)

=== Books as editor ===
- translator: Francois Guizot (1828). The History of Civilization in Europe. Penguin Books. ISBN 978-0140446654.
- (with David Miller): various (1985). The Nature of Political Theory. Clarendon Press. ISBN 978-0198274735., which is a collection of essays by and about political philosopher John Plamenatz.

=== Papers as author ===
- Siedentop, Larry (1979). "Two Liberal Traditions". The Idea of Freedom: Essays in Honour of Isaiah Berlin. Oxford University Press.

=== Newspaper articles ===
- Siedentop, Larry (14 October 2009). ""A Nation Stuck in Selfish Mode: Too Much Liberalism is Quite the Wrong Diagnosis for British Decline"". The Independent. London.
- Siedentop, Larry (23 January 2014). ""Remember the Religious Roots of Liberal Thought"". The Financial Times. London. Archived from the original on 7 April 2014.
