= Edmund Brocklebank =

British politician (1882–1949)

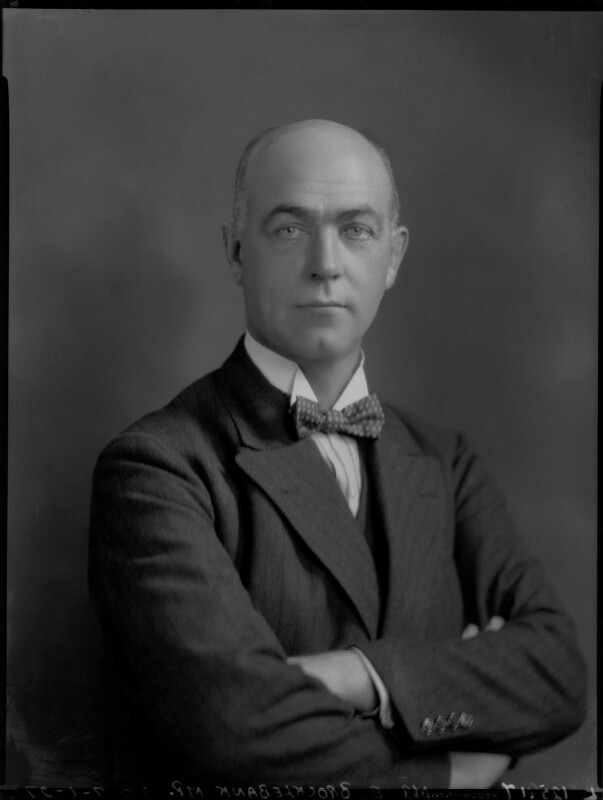
- Sir Edmund Brocklebank

Member of Parliament for Liverpool Fairfield
- In office 1931–1945

Member of Parliament for Nottingham East
- In office 1924–1929

Personal details
- Born: Clement Edmund Royds Brocklebank; 28 August 1882
- Died: 24 August 1949 (aged 66)
- Party: Conservative

Sir Clement Edmund Royds Brocklebank (28 August 1882 – 24 August 1949) was a British Conservative Party politician. He was a Member of Parliament (MP) from 1924 to 1929, and from 1931 to 1945.

== Biography ==
He was born in Liverpool and was a member of a well-known Merseyside family associated with shipping and the cotton trade in the city for more than a century. He was the youngest son of Thomas Brocklebank, J.P, D.L. He was educated at Eton and Magdalen College, Oxford. He did much social work in his youth, living for a time in the East end of London. For a time he was a clergyman in that part of the city. He resigned from Holy Orders before making a successful career as a stock and share broker.

At the 1923 general election, he was an unsuccessful candidate in the Smethwick constituency, but at the 1924 election he was elected as MP for Nottingham East, defeating the Liberal Party MP Norman Birkett. At the 1929 election, he did not stand again in Nottingham (where Birkett regained the seat), but stood in Birkenhead East, where the sitting Conservative MP William Stott had stood down. However, he was defeated by the Liberal candidate, former MP Henry White.

Brocklebank returned to the House of Commons at the 1931 general election, when he won the Liverpool Fairfield constituency. He held that seat until his defeat at the 1945 general election.

In 1933 he brought in a Bill which became law to allow marriages between 8 a.m. and 6 p.m. rather than between 8 a.m. and 3 p.m. to save poor people the cost of a day's work.

In 1927 he married Grace Wise, niece of Tory MP Frederic Wise. They married in the Crypt Chapel of the House of Commons. The catering department of the House produced its first wedding cake for the occasion.

He was knighted in King George VI's 1937 Coronation Honours. He was survived by his wife and a daughter.

Parliament of the United Kingdom
Preceded by Norman Birkett	Member of Parliament for Nottingham East; 1924–1929	Succeeded by Norman Birkett
Preceded by Jack Cohen	Member of Parliament for Liverpool Fairfield; 1931–1945	Succeeded by Arthur Moody
