= Alfred Bigland =

British businessman and politician (1855–1936)

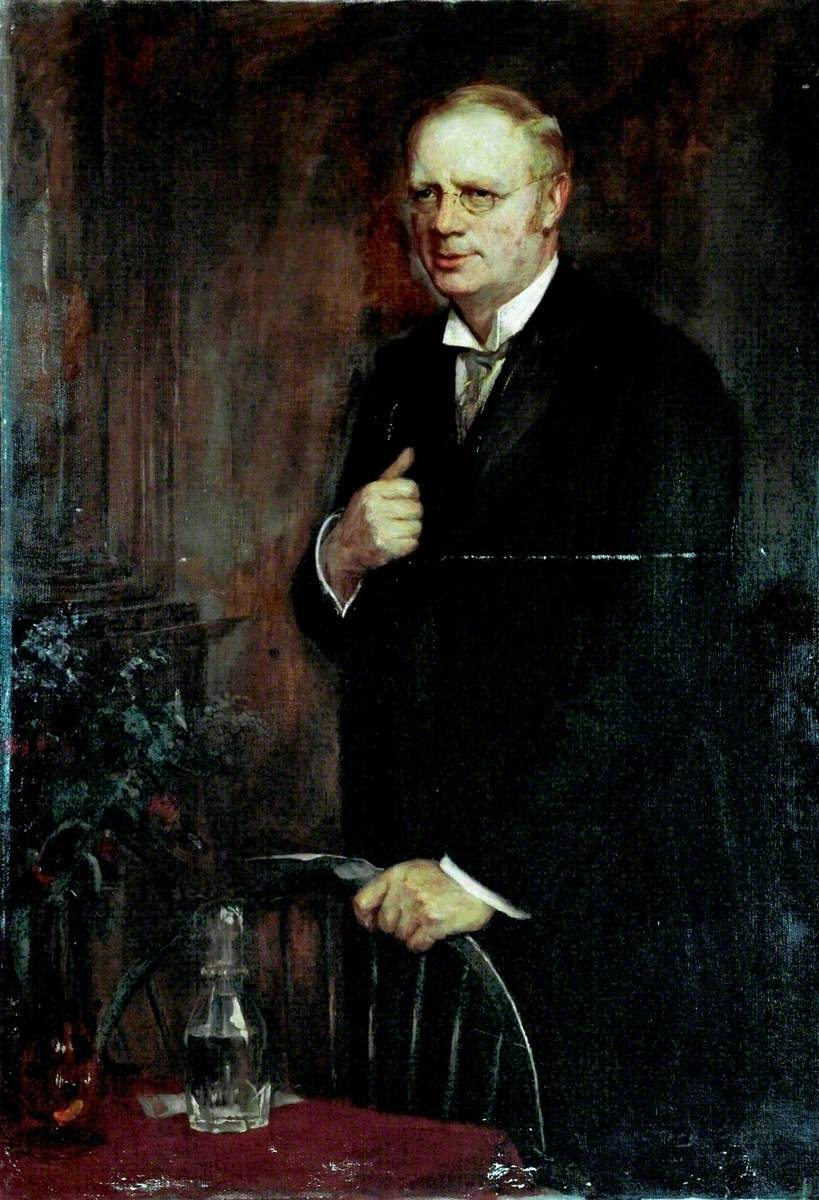
- Portrait by Percy Bigland, c. 1905

Member of Parliament for Birkenhead East Birkenhead (1910–1918)
- In office 3 December 1910 – 15 November 1922
- Preceded by: Henry Vivian
- Succeeded by: Graham White

Personal details
- Born: 15 March 1855
- Died: 1936 (aged 80–81)
- Party: Conservative
- Spouse: Emily Arkle
- Relations: Percy Bigland (brother)
- Parent: Edwin Bigland (father)

Alfred Bigland (15 March 1855 – 1936) was a British businessman and politician who represented Birkenhead and Birkenhead East in the House of Commons of the United Kingdom from 1910 to 1922.

== Early life and career ==
Bigland was born on 15 March 1855, son of Edwin Bigland, of Birkenhead.

He was educated at the Quaker school at Sidcot. As a supporter of the First World War, he resigned his membership of Quakers in 1914.

== Political career ==
He was elected to Parliament as a Conservative and Unionist in the December 1910 general election, for the Birkenhead Constituency and in 1918 for the new constituency of East Birkenhead, sitting until defeated in the 1922 general election by a Liberal. His particular political interest was Tariff reform. During the World War I, he was responsible for acquiring sufficient quantities of glycerine for the manufacture of cordite propellant. He also persuaded the War Office to drop its minimum height for recruits to enable "Bantam battalions" to be formed.

His portrait, painted by his brother, Percy Bigland is in the Williamson Art Gallery in Birkenhead.

== Personal life ==
He married Emily Jane Arkle in 1878; they had a son, Douglas, and two daughters. Mrs Bigland died in 1931.

Parliament of the United Kingdom
Preceded by Henry Vivian	Member of Parliament for Birkenhead; Dec. 1910 – 1918	Constituency split into East and West Birkenhead
New constituency	Member of Parliament for Birkenhead East; 1918–1922	Succeeded by Graham White
