= Grayson baronets =

Baronetcy in the Baronetage of the United Kingdom

The Grayson Baronetcy, of Ravenspoint in the County of Anglesey, is a title in the Baronetage of the United Kingdom. It was created on 12 January 1922 for Lt-Col. Sir Henry Grayson, KBE. He was a director of several shipping and shipbuilding companies and also represented Birkenhead West in the House of Commons from 1918 to 1922. The fourth Baronet was a writer and composer.

== Grayson baronets, of Ravenspoint (1922) ==
Escutcheon of the Grayson baronets

- Sir Henry Mulleneux Grayson, 1st Baronet (1865–1951)
- Sir Denys Henry Harrington Grayson, 2nd Baronet (1892–1955)
- Sir Ronald Henry Rudyard Grayson, 3rd Baronet (1916–1987)
- Sir Rupert Stanley Harrington Grayson, 4th Baronet (1897–1991)
- Sir Jeremy Brian Vincent Harrington Grayson, 5th Baronet (1933–2023)
- Sir Simon Jeremy Grayson, 6th Baronet (born 1959)

The heir presumptive is the current holder's brother, Paul Francis Grayson (born 1965).
