= Charlotte Hanbury =

English philanthropist 1830–1900

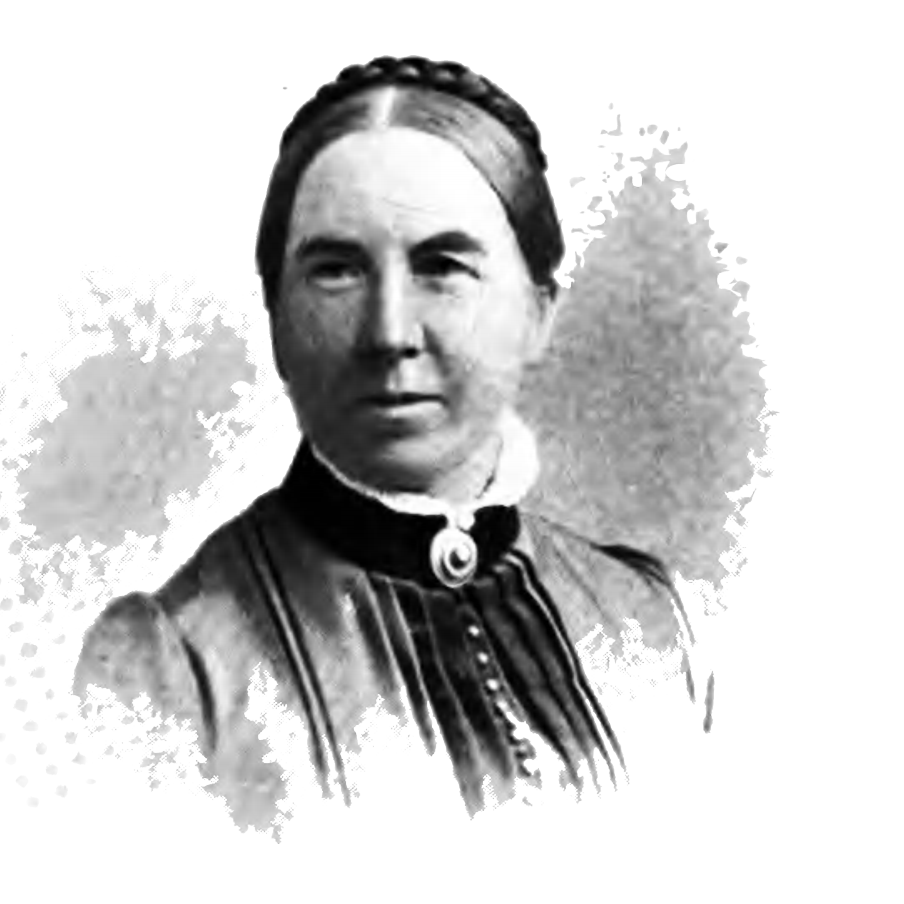
- from her autobiography
- Born: 10 April 1830; Stoke Newington, England
- Died: 22 October 1900 (aged 70); Richmond, England
- Occupation: philanthropist

Charlotte Hanbury (10 April 1830 – 22 October 1900) was a British philanthropist and a missionary in Morocco.

== Life ==
Hanbury was born in Stoke Newington in London. Her mother Elizabeth Hanbury was a Quaker minister who had married Cornelius Hanbury of the chemist company Allen & Hanburys in 1826, becoming his second wife. She had a brother named Cornelius like her father and a sister named like her mother. Charlotte worked first helping in local ragged schools.

Her parents were noted Quakers, Charlotte was evangelical but she was not so denominational. Her first spiritual work was to work with George Brealey. He was from the Open Brethren and he started his work distributing tracts to people at fairs and public events around his home of Exeter in Devon. She still helped in schools in the Blackdown hills so she could assist Brealey in the counties of Somerset and Devon.

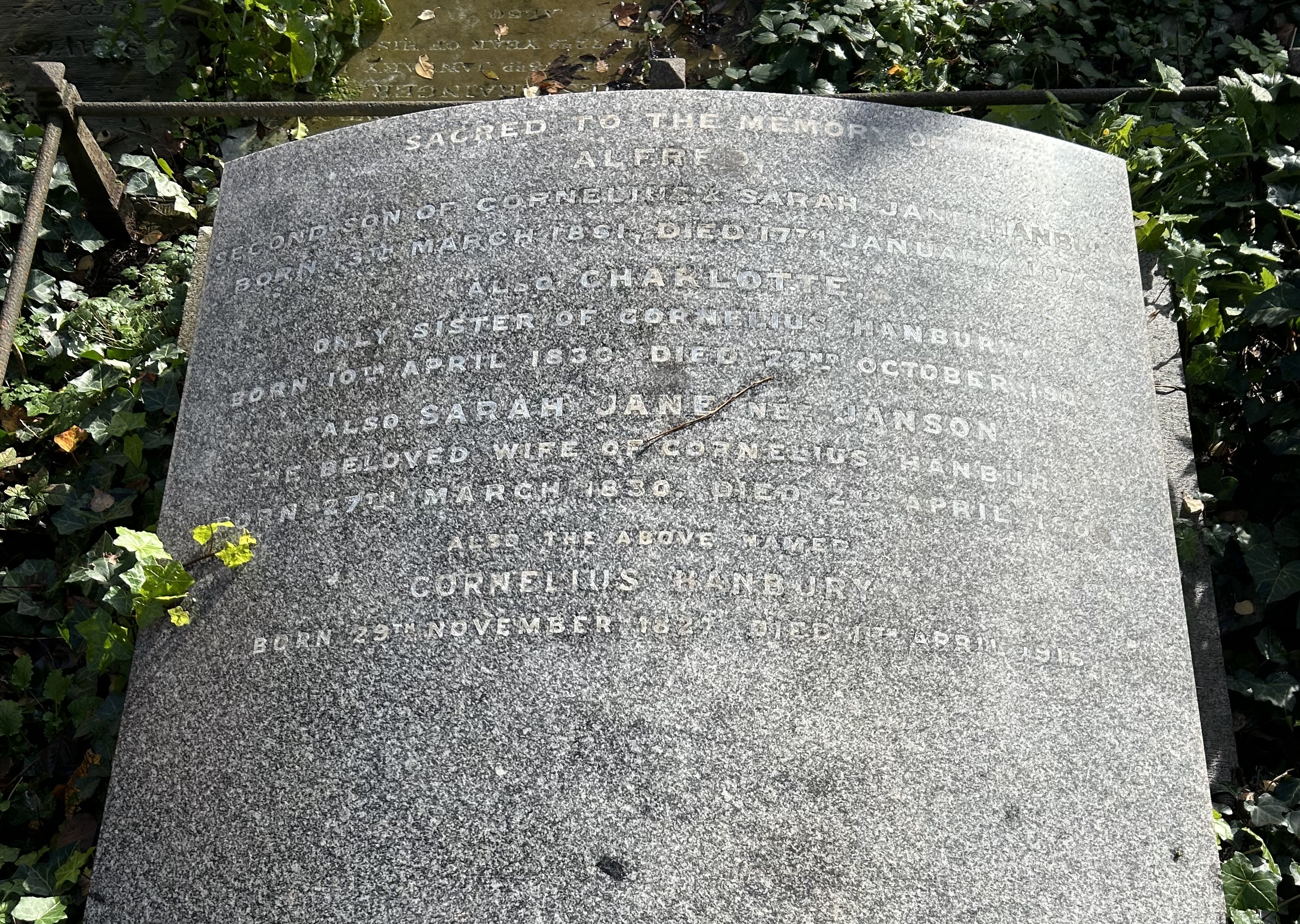
Hanbury family vault in Highgate Cemetery

In 1887 Elizabeth and Charlotte Hanbury left the wilds and moved to the home of her brother Cornelius, in Richmond. In 1889 she set out to assist prisoners in Morocco and the brief time she was there she established a reading room as a base for Christian outreach. In 1900 she returned to England after being told that she would not live much longer. The Tangier mission continued run by Henry Gurney who was her cousin. Henry would make this task as his life's work.

In 1900 when her mother was 107 years old her portrait was painted by Percy Bigland and she wrote a letter to Queen Victoria from her "oldest subject". Charlotte Hanbury dictated her autobiography and died in Richmond on 22 October 1900 and was buried in the family vault in Highgate Cemetery. Her mother died 1 year and 9 days later aged 108 years and 144 days. Charlotte's autobiography was published by Caroline Head the following year.
