= Ellis Nuttall =

British politician

Ellis Nutall (8 December 1890 – 1 July 1951) was a British barrister and politician who was Conservative MP for Birkenhead West from 1924 to 1929.

Educated at Rugby School and Trinity College, Oxford, Nuttall was called to the bar by the Middle Temple in 1913. He served in the Royal Field Artillery during the First World War in Egypt, Gallipoli, and France. After the war, he returned to his practice on the Northern Circuit.

He won Birkenhead West in 1924, but lost it to Labour in 1929. He returned to service in the British Army during the Second World War.

Parliament of the United Kingdom
Preceded by William Henry Egan	Member of Parliament for Birkenhead West; 1924–1929	Succeeded by William Henry Egan
