= William Henry Egan =

British politician (1869–1943)

William Henry Egan (14 February 1869 – 10 September 1943) was a British Labour politician who served as MP for Birkenhead West.

Egan was active in the Labour Party in Birkenhead, and served as secretary of the town's trades council. He stood unsuccessfully in Birkenhead West at the 1918 and 1922 United Kingdom general elections, before winning the seat in 1923. Although he lost it in 1924, he regained it in 1929, before finally losing it in 1931.

Egan also served on Birkenhead Town Council, and was Mayor of Birkenhead in 1939/40 and 1941/42.

Parliament of the United Kingdom
Preceded by William Henry Stott	Member of Parliament for Birkenhead West; 1923 – 1924	Succeeded by Ellis Nuttall
Preceded by Ellis Nuttall	Member of Parliament for Birkenhead West; 1929 – 1931	Succeeded by John Sandeman Allen
