= John Sandeman Allen (Birkenhead West MP) =

British politician

John Sandeman Allen (30 May 1892 – 29 September 1949) was a British Conservative Party politician. He was a Member of Parliament (MP) for Birkenhead West from 1931 to 1945. At the 1945 general election he stood in the previously Conservative-held South Norfolk constituency, but the Labour candidate, Christopher Mayhew, was elected as the constituency's MP.

Parliament of the United Kingdom
Preceded by William Henry Egan	Member of Parliament for Birkenhead West; 1931–1945	Succeeded by Percy Collick
