= Birkenhead East =

Parliamentary constituency in the United Kingdom, 1918–1950

- Former borough constituency for the House of Commons

1918–1950
- Seats: one
- Created from: Birkenhead and Wirral
- Replaced by: Birkenhead, Bebington

Birkenhead East was a parliamentary constituency centred on the Birkenhead area of Merseyside. It returned one Member of Parliament (MP) to the House of Commons of the Parliament of the United Kingdom, elected by the first past the post voting system.

== History ==
The constituency was created by the Representation of the People Act 1918 for the 1918 general election when the Parliamentary Borough of Birkenhead was split between the East and West Divisions.

It was abolished by the Representation of the People Act 1948 for the 1950 general election.

== Boundaries ==
The County Borough of Birkenhead wards of Argyle, Bebington, Clifton, Egerton, and Mersey, and the part of the borough which lay between the eastern boundary of Argyle, Mersey and Bebington wards and the centre of the bed of the River Mersey.

On abolition, southern parts (Bebington, Egerton and Mersea wards) were included in the new constituency of Bebington, and northern parts (Argyle and Clifton wards) were included in the reconstituted constituency of Birkenhead.

== Members of Parliament ==
Year	Member	Party
1918	Alfred Bigland	Unionist
1922	Graham White	Liberal
1924	William Henry Stott	Unionist
1929	Graham White	Liberal
1945	Frank Soskice	Labour
1950	constituency abolished	

== Election results ==
=== Election in the 1910s ===
General election 1918: Birkenhead East
Party		Candidate	Votes	%
C	Unionist	Alfred Bigland	13,012	64.5
	Labour	John Finigan	5,399	26.7
	Liberal	Graham White	1,787	8.8
Majority			7,613	37.8
Turnout			20,198	60.7
Registered electors				
	Unionist win (new seat)			
C indicates candidate endorsed by the coalition government.

=== Election in the 1920s ===
General election 1922: Birkenhead East
Party	Candidate	Votes	%	±%
Liberal	Graham White	14,690	57.8	+49.0
Unionist	Alfred Bigland	10,745	42.2	−22.3
Majority		3,945	15.6	N/A
Turnout		25,435	77.5	−16.8
Registered electors				
Liberal gain from Unionist		Swing	+35.7	

General election 1923: Birkenhead East
Party	Candidate	Votes	%	±%
Liberal	Graham White	15,845	63.5	+5.7
Unionist	Luke Lees	9,091	36.5	−5.7
Majority		6,754	27.0	+11.4
Turnout		24,936	74.1	−3.4
Registered electors				
Liberal hold		Swing	+5.7	

General election 1924: Birkenhead East
Party	Candidate	Votes	%	±%
Unionist	William Henry Stott	11,328	40.3	+3.8
Liberal	Graham White	9,275	33.0	−30.5
Labour	James Coulthard	7,496	26.7	New
Majority		2,053	7.3	N/A
Turnout		20,603	81.0	+6.9
Registered electors				
Unionist gain from Liberal		Swing		

General election 1929: Birkenhead East
Party	Candidate	Votes	%	±%
Liberal	Graham White	13,157	35.9	+2.9
Unionist	Edmund Brocklebank	11,860	32.3	−8.0
Labour	James Coulthard	11,654	31.8	+5.1
Majority		1,297	3.6	N/A
Turnout		25,017	78.8	−2.2
Registered electors				
Liberal gain from Unionist		Swing	+5.5	

=== Election in the 1930s ===
General election 1931: Birkenhead East
Party	Candidate	Votes	%	±%
Liberal	Graham White	26,938	73.2	+37.3
Labour	Charles McVey	9,868	26.8	−5.0
Majority		17,070	46.4	+42.8
Turnout		36,806	79.1	+0.3
Registered electors				
Liberal hold		Swing	+21.2	

- Conservative candidate Walter Fletcher withdrew 17 days before polling day

General election 1935: Birkenhead East
Party	Candidate	Votes	%	±%
Liberal	Graham White	16,548	48.1	−25.1
Conservative	S J Hill	9,854	28.6	New
Labour	Mary Mercer	8,028	23.3	−3.5
Majority		6,694	19.5	−26.9
Turnout		34,430	74.2	−4.9
Registered electors				
Liberal hold		Swing		

=== Election in the 1940s ===
General election 1945: Birkenhead East
Party	Candidate	Votes	%	±%
Labour	Frank Soskice	14,790	45.5	+22.2
Liberal	Graham White	10,140	31.1	−17.0
Conservative	Frederick Newell Bucher	7,624	23.4	−5.2
Majority		4,650	14.4	N/A
Turnout		32,554	73.6	−0.6
Registered electors				
Labour gain from Liberal		Swing	+19.6	

== See also ==
- History of parliamentary constituencies and boundaries in Cheshire
