= Elizabeth Hanbury =

British philanthropist (1793–1901)

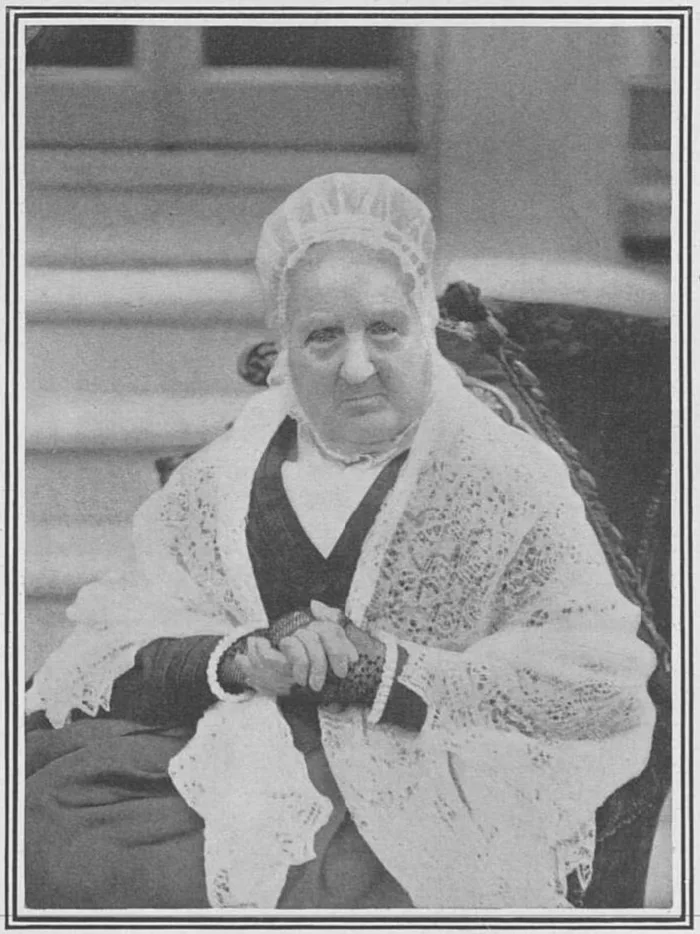
- Born: 9 June 1793; London, Great Britain
- Died: 31 October 1901 (aged 108 years 144 days); Richmond, London, U.K
- Known for: centenarian
- Spouse(s): Cornelius Hanbury (1826－1869, his death)
- Children: 3

Elizabeth Hanbury (9 June 1793 – 31 October 1901) was a British philanthropist who worked with Elizabeth Fry. She is thought to have been Queen Victoria's "oldest subject"; she died in 1901, aged 108 years and 144 days.

== Life ==
Elizabeth Sanderson was born in Leadenhall Street in London in 1793; a record of her birth was made at the parish church of All Hallows-on-the-Wall. Her father was a "China tea merchant", and she had family connections dating back to Robert Sanderson, Bishop of Lincoln. She and her sister Mary were Quakers and they visited prisons with the famous reformer Elizabeth Fry, including prisoners who were bound for transportation. In 1833 Elizabeth Hanbury was recognized as a minister in the Quaker church.

She married Cornelius Hanbury of the chemist company Allen & Hanburys in 1826, becoming his second wife. (Cornelius had been married to a daughter of his business partner William Allen.) He was the first cousin of the Gurney family of Norwich. In 1830 the Hanburys had a daughter named Charlotte, who was to become a missionary in Morocco; The Hanburys had one son, also named Cornelius; his two daughters, Elizabeth and Charlotte, became missionaries in India and China.

Her husband, Cornelius, attended the World Anti-Slavery Convention in 1840 at which only men were allowed to speak. He died in 1869.

In 1887, Elizabeth and Charlotte Hanbury left the wilds and moved to the home of Cornelius, in Richmond, on the western outskirts of London. When Elizabeth Hanbury was 100 years old her portrait was painted by Percy Bigland. This portrait passed down to Thomas Hanbury, creator of the botanical gardens in Italy. In 1900 she wrote a letter to Queen Victoria from her "oldest subject".

She died in Richmond in 1901 at the age of 108 years and 144 days. Her long life was documented in The Times and later reported in the Dictionary of National Biography and in the Morning Post in Queensland. An autobiography of Elizabeth was published soon after her death.

== See also ==
- Sarah Thomas, a Welsh woman who died aged 108 in 1897
