= Graham White (politician) =

British Liberal Party politician

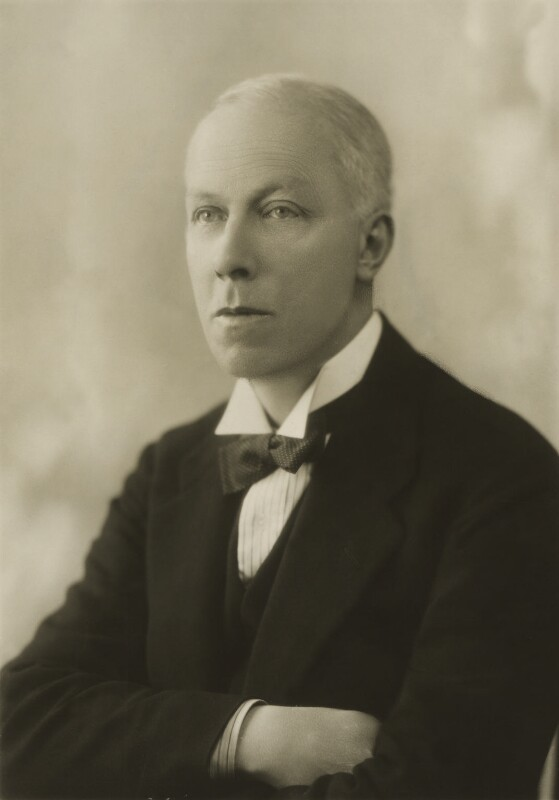

President of the Liberal Party
- In office 1954–1955
- Leader: Clement Davies
- Preceded by: Lawrence Robson
- Succeeded by: The Lord Rea

Member of Parliament for Birkenhead East
- In office 1922–1924
- Preceded by: Alfred Bigland
- Succeeded by: William Henry Stott
- In office 1929–1945
- Preceded by: William Henry Stott
- Succeeded by: Frank Soskice

Personal details
- Born: Henry Graham White; 26 August 1880
- Died: 19 February 1965 (aged 84)
- Party: Liberal Party
- Spouse: Mary Irene Heath (m. 1910; died 1962)
- Children: 3
- Education: Liverpool University

Henry Graham White (26 August 1880 – 19 February 1965), known as Graham White, was a radical British Liberal Party politician.

== Background ==
He was the son of John Arnold White and Annie Sinclair Graham of Birkenhead. He was educated at Birkenhead School from 1891 and Liverpool University. Jointly with his brother, Arnold, he endowed the Malcolm White Scholarship at Birkenhead School in memory of their younger brother who was killed in World War I. He also bought and gave a house known as Overdale with its grounds to the school.

== Family ==
He married, in 1910, Mary Irene Heath of Nether Stowey, Somerset. They had two sons and one daughter. Mary died in 1962. His son, John Graham-White (1913-2008), was a founder of the profession of clinical psychology.

== Political career ==
In 1917 he was elected a Member of Birkenhead Town Council. In 1918 he was Liberal candidate for the Birkenhead East Division of Cheshire at the General Election. He was critical of the Coalition Government for calling an election while many of those in the armed forces were still abroad and unable to take part in the election. Apart from this criticism, he was happy to call himself a supporter of David Lloyd George and the Coalition Government. However the Coalition Government endorsed his Unionist opponent and White came third, losing his deposit;

General election 1918: Birkenhead East
| Party | Candidate | Votes | % | ±% |
|---|---|---|---|---|
| Unionist | Alfred Bigland | 13,012 | 64.5 | n/a |
| Labour | John Finigan | 5,399 | 26.7 | n/a |
| Liberal | Graham White | 1,787 | 8.8 | n/a |
| Majority | | 7,613 | 37.8 | n/a |
| Turnout | | | 60.7 | n/a |
| Unionist win | | | | |

In 1920 he was re-elected to Birkenhead Council. In 1921 he was appointed the town council's Chairman of the Higher Education Committee, serving until 1922. In 1922 he stood for the second time as Liberal candidate for Birkenhead East and managed to turn third place with a lost deposit into victory;

General election 1922: Birkenhead East
| Party | Candidate | Votes | % | ±% |
|---|---|---|---|---|
| Liberal | Graham White | 14,690 | 57.8 | +49.0 |
| Unionist | Alfred Bigland | 10,745 | 42.2 | −22.3 |
| Majority | | 3,945 | 15.6 | 53.4 |
| Turnout | | | 77.5 | |
| Liberal gain from Unionist | | Swing | +35.7 | |

He stood down from Birkenhead Town Council in 1923. He was a passionate internationalist and in 1923 he was elected a Member of the Executive Committee, of the League of Nations Union, serving until 1924. In 1923 he was re-elected to parliament with an increased majority;

General election 1923: Birkenhead East
| Party | Candidate | Votes | % | ±% |
|---|---|---|---|---|
| Liberal | Graham White | 15,845 | 63.5 | +5.7 |
| Unionist | Luke Lees | 9,091 | 36.5 | −5.7 |
| Majority | | 6,754 | 27.0 | +11.4 |
| Turnout | | | 74.1 | −3.4 |
| Liberal hold | | Swing | +5.7 | |

In 1924 at the General election, the Labour party chose to field a candidate against him with disastrous effects, causing his defeat;

General election 1924: Birkenhead East
| Party | Candidate | Votes | % | ±% |
|---|---|---|---|---|
| Unionist | William Henry Stott | 11,328 | 40.3 | +3.8 |
| Liberal | Graham White | 9,275 | 33.0 | −30.5 |
| Labour | James Coulthard | 7,496 | 26.7 | n/a |
| Majority | | 2,053 | 7.3 | 34.3 |
| Turnout | | | 81.0 | +6.9 |
| Unionist gain from Liberal | | Swing | +17.1 | |

In 1929 he re-gained his Birkenhead East seat and returned to parliament after an absence of five years;

General election 1929: Birkenhead East
| Party | Candidate | Votes | % | ±% |
|---|---|---|---|---|
| Liberal | Graham White | 13,157 | 35.9 | +2.9 |
| Unionist | Edmund Brocklebank | 11,860 | 32.3 | −8.0 |
| Labour | James Coulthard | 11,654 | 31.8 | +5.1 |
| Majority | | 1,297 | 3.6 | 10.9 |
| Turnout | | | 78.8 | |
| Liberal gain from Unionist | | Swing | +5.5 | |

In 1930 he served a second term as a Member of the Executive Committee, of the League of Nations Union. In 1930 he was appointed a Member of the parliamentary Select Committee on Private Schools. In 1930 he was appointed a Member of Indian Round Table Conference in London to discuss constitutional reforms. Upon the formation of the National Government in 1931 he was appointed Assistant Postmaster General. In 1931 at the General Election, the Conservatives chose not to field a candidate against him as the parties were partners in the National Government, as a result, White was comfortably re-elected;

General election 1931: Birkenhead East
| Party | Candidate | Votes | % | ±% |
|---|---|---|---|---|
| Liberal | Graham White | 26,938 | 73.2 | +37.3 |
| Labour | C McVey | 9,868 | 26.8 | −5.0 |
| Majority | | 17,070 | 46.4 | +36.5 |
| Turnout | | | 79.1 | +0.3 |
| Liberal hold | | Swing | +21.2 | |

In 1932 he resigned from National Government office along with all the other Liberal party Ministers who followed Sir Herbert Samuel. In 1933 along with the rest of the Liberal parliamentary party he went into opposition to the National government. In 1935 he was appointed a Member of the parliamentary Broadcasting Committee. In 1935 given that the Liberals were now in opposition, the Conservatives chose to oppose him once again. however, he still managed to top the poll;

General election 1935: Birkenhead East
| Party | Candidate | Votes | % | ±% |
|---|---|---|---|---|
| Liberal | Graham White | 16,548 | 48.1 | −25.1 |
| Conservative | S J Hill | 9,854 | 28.6 | n/a |
| Labour | M A Mercer | 8,028 | 23.3 | −3.5 |
| Majority | | 6,694 | 19.5 | −17.0 |
| Turnout | | | 74.2 | −4.9 |
| Liberal hold | | Swing | n/a | |

In 1935 after Sir Archibald Sinclair became Liberal party leader, he offered White the position of Liberal Chief Whip but White declined. In 1937 he was appointed a Member of the parliamentary Rent Restriction Acts Committee. In 1938 he was appointed a Member of the parliamentary Distress for Rent Committee. In 1939 another general election was anticipated and White was re-selected as the Liberal prospective candidate. There were calls for the Liberal and Labour parties to join together in a Popular Front to defeat the National Government. By the autumn of 1939, the Birkenhead Labour party had no candidate in the field and a straight fight with a Conservative was anticipated. However, due to the outbreak of war the election was postponed. In 1940 he was elected a Member of the Executive Committee of the British Council, a body specialising in international educational and cultural exchange. In 1940 he was appointed a Member of the Select Committee on National Expenditure. In 1943 he was Chairman of the Committee on Seamen's Welfare in Ports. In 1945 he was appointed a member of the Privy Council, thus allowing him to use the title, The Right Honourable. In 1945 he was one of the M.P.s who visited Buchenwald concentration camp. In 1945 he finally lost his seat when the country swung to the Labour party;

General election 1945: Birkenhead East
| Party | Candidate | Votes | % | ±% |
|---|---|---|---|---|
| Labour | Frank Soskice | 14,790 | 45.5 | +22.2 |
| Liberal | Graham White | 10,140 | 31.1 | −17.0 |
| Conservative | Frederick Newell Bucher | 7,624 | 23.4 | −5.2 |
| Majority | | 4,650 | 14.4 | n/a |
| Turnout | | | 73.6 | −0.6 |
| Labour gain from Liberal | | Swing | +19.6 | |

In 1945 he was conferred the title of Freeman of Birkenhead. In 1950 his old Birkenhead East seat was abolished with part of it going into the new Bebington constituency. White stood there as Liberal candidate but finished third;

General election 1950: Bebington
| Party | Candidate | Votes | % | ±% |
|---|---|---|---|---|
| Conservative | Hendrie Oakshott | 25,309 | 43.8 | n/a |
| Labour | Frank Soskice | 22,090 | 38.3 | n/a |
| Liberal | Graham White | 10,324 | 17.9 | n/a |
| Majority | | 3,219 | 5.5 | n/a |
| Turnout | | | 87.2 | n/a |
| Conservative win | | | | |

He did not stand for parliament again. He was President of the Liberal Party from 1954 to 1955. In 1955 he was awarded a LLD by the University of Liverpool. He was Vice-President of the Liberal Party from 1958 to 1959. White also served on a number of other bodies; the executive of the Anti-Slavery Society, Chairman of the British Association for Labour Legislation, Chairman of the Advisory Committee on War risk insurance, a Member of Council of the Royal Institute of International Affairs, a Member of Council of Bedford College for Women, a Member of the Council on Aliens, Chairman of Council of the Beechcroft Settlement, a Member of the Inter-Parliamentary Association, a Fellow of the Royal Statistical Society, a Member of the Masterman Committee on the political activities of Civil Servants, a Member of the Curtis Committee on the Care of Children and a member of the Board of Social Sciences and Administration of Liverpool University.

His parliamentary colleague Sir Percy Harris described him as "disinterested, with a fine sense of duty and a varied knowledge of every kind of social problem, he was a mine of information and always ready to step into the breach."

== Papers ==
A collection of White's papers were donated to Parliament by his grandson and have been deposited in the House of Lords Records Office. The papers comprise political papers and correspondence including constituency and election material, papers concerning Liberal Party organisation, draft bills, committee reports and memoranda on topics such as unemployment benefit and old age pensions. There are papers on White's interests outside Parliament, including the British Council and the Eleanor Rathbone Trust. There are also papers regarding White's campaign on behalf of German internees during the Second World War.

Parliament of the United Kingdom
| Preceded by Alfred Bigland | Member of Parliament for Birkenhead East; 1922–1924 | Succeeded by William Henry Stott |
| Preceded by William Henry Stott | Member of Parliament for Birkenhead East; 1929–1945 | Succeeded by Frank Soskice |
Party political offices
| Preceded by Lawrence Robson | President of the Liberal Party; 1954–1955 | Succeeded by The Lord Rea |
