= Mary Brazier =

American neuroscientist

Mary A.B. Brazier
- Born: May 18, 1904; Weston-super-Mare, England
- Died: May 14, 1995 (aged 90); Falmouth, Massachusetts
- Education: University of London
- Known for: Electroencephalogram (EEG) Research
- Children: Oliver Gidden Brazier (1935–2001)
- Scientific career
- Fields: Biology
- Workplaces: Harvard Medical School, Massachusetts Institute of Technology, University of California, Los Angeles

Mary "Mollie" Agnes Burniston Brown Brazier (May 18, 1904 – May 14, 1995) was a prominent neuroscientist at Massachusetts General Hospital, Harvard Medical School, Massachusetts Institute of Technology, and University of California, Los Angeles (UCLA).

== Life and work ==
She was born in Weston-super-Mare, England, in 1904 and died in Falmouth, Massachusetts, in 1995. She was the second of two children in a Quaker family.

She attended the Sidcot School and earned a Bachelor of Science from Bedford College of the University of London.

She received a Ph.D in physiology and biochemistry from the University of London in 1930, began neuroscience research at Maudsley Hospital, London, and in 1940 came to Boston on a Rockefeller Fellowship. She remained at the Massachusetts General Hospital, Harvard University, and the Massachusetts Institute of Technology for twenty years. In 1961, she moved to the Brain Research Institute at UCLA until her retirement. She was internationally known as an outstanding neuroscientist, historian, author, and editor.

Brazier made many fundamental contributions to the study of EEG changes in anesthesia and was one of the pioneers in applying computer analysis to EEG signals. She also published in history of science.

Beginning in 1948 Brazier worked on integrating Norbert Wiener's work on noise processing to the analysis of EEGs. Her work in autocorrelation and cross-correlational analyses was published in 1952, co-authored by James Casby - an undergraduate working in her laboratory. In 1953 Brazier and Wiener presented their work at the Third International EEG Congress in Cambridge, Massachusetts.

In the 1950s she was one of the people, together with Herbert Jasper, Henri Gastaut, Ivane Beritashvili and Denise Albe-Fessard to promote the idea of the International Brain Research Organization (IBRO) and assisted in its founding by enlisting UNESCO support. She was the sixth secretary general, and first woman in that role at IBRO, beginning in 1978 and remaining in that position until 1983.

She was editor-in-chief of Electroencephalography and Clinical Neurophysiology from 1974 to 1984.

Brazier was the author of almost 250 articles and books. Her papers are kept at the UCLA Special Collections library.

== Family ==
Her older brother became a physicist. Her father was a cousin of Sir Arthur Eddington, the English astrophysicist whose 1919 solar eclipse observations provided confirmation of one of Albert Einstein's predictions from the General relativity theory.

In 1928 she married electrical engineer Leslie J. Brazier. They had a son, Oliver, in 1935. In 1940 Brazier moved to Boston with her son; her husband Leslie remained in England.

== In popular culture ==
She is mentioned as a New Year's Eve 1954 dinner guest of Avis DeVoto in As Always, Julia.

== Selected books and articles ==
- "Bibliography of electoencephalography, 1875 – 1948." EEG and Clinical Neurophysiolohy (1950). Supplement 1: 1–178.
- "Neural nets and integration." In Richter, K. (ed.)m Perspectives in Neuropsychiatry (1950). London, UK: HK Lewis. pp. 35–45.
- The Electrical Activity of the Nervous System. London, UK: Pitman. 1951.
- "Some uses of computers in experimental neurology." Experimental Neurology (1960). 2: 123–143.
- A History of Neurophysiology in the Seventeenth and Eighteenth Centuries: From Concept to Experiment. New York: Raven, 1984.
- A History of Neurophysiology in the Nineteenth Century. New York, Raven, 1988.

== Honors and awards ==
- Gold Medal of the (British) Institute of Electrical Engineers, 1934.
- Van Meter Prize of the American Association for the Study of Goiter, 1934.
- Elected member to the American Academy of Arts and Sciences, 1956.
- Career Research Award from Neurology Institute at National Institutes of Health, 1962. One of only four to receive the award.
- Grey Walter Medal from the British EEG Society, 1984.

After her death the M.A.B. Brazier Young Investigator International Award was named in her honor by the International Federation of Clinical Neurophysiology. The award is now named the Mary Brazier Young Investigator Paper Award.

== Sources ==
- Barlow, John, Naquet, Roberts, and van Duijn, Hans. "In memoriam: Mary A.B. Brazier (1904 – 1995)." Electroencephalography and Clinical Neurophysiology (1996). 98: 1–4.
- Marshall, Louise. "Early History of IBRO: The Birth of Organized Neuroscience." Neuroscience Vol. 72, No. I, pp. 283–306, 1996.
- Parlee, M. B. 2006. Brazier, Mary A. B. Encyclopedia of Cognitive Science.
- Reardon, Joan. As Always, Julia. Houghton Mifflin, 2010.
