= Arthur Moody =

British politician (1891–1976)

Arthur Seymour Moody (6 June 1891 – 12 December 1976 ) was a British joiner and politician. He was a low-profile backbench Labour Party Member of Parliament for nearly twenty years.

== Early career ==
Moody was born in Kingston upon Hull and went to local schools run by the local council before training in woodworking at Hull Technical College. He was an active member of the Amalgamated Society of Woodworkers from 1912, holding several union posts, and also joined the Labour Party. In 1934 Moody was elected to Hull City Council, serving a single three-year term. At the 1935 general election, Moody was the Labour Party candidate for Liverpool Fairfield, losing by more than 7,000 votes.

== Election to Parliament ==
In 1942 Moody was elected unopposed to the National Executive Committee of the Labour Party in the Trade Union section, his candidature sponsored by the Amalgamated Society of Woodworkers. At the 1944 Labour Party conference he replied on behalf of the NEC to a debate about housing. He was chosen again as candidate for Liverpool Fairfield, and in the 1945 general election secured a swing of 14% to win the seat by 1,147 votes. He then stood down from the National Executive Committee in 1946.

== Political views ==
Moody was a low-profile Member of Parliament who spoke rarely. In 1946 he criticised the National Insurance Bill for containing "too much Beveridge and too little Socialism". He was generally a loyal supporter of the government, but in 1948 he did break the whip to oppose an annuity to be paid to Princess Elizabeth and the Duke of Edinburgh after their marriage. However, Moody urged disciplinary action be taken against Labour MPs who had signed a telegram to support Pietro Nenni, the Communist-allied Italian socialist.

At the 1950 general election, Moody's constituency was merged with others and he was selected instead for Gateshead East where he opposed Konni Zilliacus, who had been expelled after signing the Nenni telegram. He beat Zilliacus into third place and emerged 1,719 votes ahead of the Conservative candidate. His majority increased to over 5,000 in the 1951 general election, when Zilliacus did not stand.

== Retirement ==
Moody was one of the few Labour MPs strongly to support capital punishment through the 1950s. At the age of 70 in April 1962, he announced that he would not be a candidate at the next election; however, he was criticised by the BBC TV programme "That Was The Week That Was" in January 1963 for not having made any speeches in the House of Commons since the previous general election.

== Notes ==
Parliament of the United Kingdom
| Preceded by Sir Edmund Brocklebank | Member of Parliament for Liverpool Fairfield; 1945–1950 | Succeeded by Constituency abolished |
| Preceded by Konni Zilliacus for Gateshead | Member of Parliament for Gateshead East; 1950–1964 | Succeeded by Bernard Conlan |
