= James Coulthard =

English trades unionist, politician and rugby league footballer

Mayor of Birkenhead
- In office 1933–1934

Personal details
- Born: James Coulthard; 23 December 1868 Ellenborough, Cumberland, England
- Died: 1 January 1952 (aged 83) Birkenhead, Cheshire, England
- Party: Independent Labour Party
- Rugby league career

Playing information
Club
Years	Team	Pld	T	G	FG	P
1896–99	Hull FC	0	0	0	0	0
- As of 9 May 2024

James Coulthard (23 December 1868 – 1 January 1952) was a British rugby player, trade unionist and politician.

Born in Ellenborough, Cumbria, Coulthard was the son of William Coulthard, one of the founders of the Cumberland Miners' Association, and Margaret Davidson. James worked at the mine himself from 1880 to 1890. He played rugby with Brockland Rovers, captaining the team for nine seasons, but left in 1896 to play professional rugby league with Hull FC. He was there only a single season, and later worked on the railways.

From 1911, Coulthard was the secretary of the Birkenhead joint branches of the National Union of Railwaymen (NUR), and he also served on the union's Liverpool and North Wales Council, being its president in 1917/18. He was also elected to the executive of the Birkenhead Trades and Labour Council.

Coulthard was a member of the Independent Labour Party, an affiliate of the Labour Party, and was elected to Birkenhead Town Council. At the 1924 UK general election, he stood in Birkenhead East, taking 26.7% of the vote and third place. At the 1929 UK general election, he stood again, improving to 31.8%, but remaining in third place.

In 1933/34, Coulthard served as Mayor of Birkenhead.
