= Liverpool Fairfield =

Parliamentary constituency in the United Kingdom, 1918–1950

- Former borough constituency for the House of Commons

1918–1950
- Seats: one
- Created from: Liverpool West Derby and Liverpool Walton
- Replaced by: Liverpool Edge Hill and Liverpool Wavertree

Liverpool Fairfield was a borough constituency in Liverpool which returned one Member of Parliament (MP) to the House of Commons of the Parliament of the United Kingdom from 1918, until it was abolished for the 1950 general election.

== Boundaries ==
The County Borough of Liverpool wards of Fairfield and Old Swan, and part of Kensington ward.

== Members of Parliament ==
Election	Member	Party
1918	Jack Cohen	Conservative
1931	Sir Edmund Brocklebank	Conservative
1945	Arthur Moody	Labour
1950	constituency abolished	

== Elections ==
=== Elections in the 1910s ===
General election 1918: Liverpool Fairfield
Party		Candidate	Votes	%	±%
	Unionist	Jack Cohen	7,698	50.6	
C	Liberal	Francis L'Estrange Joseph	4,188	27.5	
	Labour	George Porter	3,337	21.9	
Majority			3,510	23.1	
Turnout			15,223	54.9	
	Unionist win (new seat)				
C indicates candidate endorsed by the coalition government.

=== Elections in the 1920s ===
General election 1922: Liverpool Fairfield
Party	Candidate	Votes	%	±%
Unionist	Jack Cohen	14,316	72.3	+21.7
Labour	George Porter	5,478	27.7	+5.8
Majority		8,838	44.6	+21.5
Turnout		19,794	64.0	+9.1
Unionist hold		Swing	+7.9	

General election 1923: Liverpool Fairfield
Party	Candidate	Votes	%	±%
Unionist	Jack Cohen	Unopposed	N/A	N/A
Unionist hold				

General election 1924: Liverpool Fairfield
Party	Candidate	Votes	%	±%
Unionist	Jack Cohen	14,277	62.9	N/A
Labour	Mary Mercer	8,412	37.1	New
Majority		5,865	25.8	N/A
Turnout		22,689	72.2	N/A
Unionist hold		Swing	N/A	

General election 1929: Liverpool Fairfield
Party	Candidate	Votes	%	±%
Unionist	Jack Cohen	16,436	52.9	―10.0
Labour	John Hamer Sutcliffe	14,614	47.1	+10.0
Majority		1,822	5.8	―20.0
Turnout		31,050	71.9	―0.3
Unionist hold		Swing	―10.0	

=== Elections in the 1930s ===
General election 1931: Liverpool Fairfield
Party	Candidate	Votes	%	±%
Conservative	Edmund Brocklebank	24,636	75.6	+23.7
Labour	A. Dodd	7,960	24.4	―23.7
Majority		16,676	51.2	+47.4
Turnout		32,596	72.5	+0.6
Conservative hold		Swing	+23.7	

General election 1935: Liverpool Fairfield
Party	Candidate	Votes	%	±%
Conservative	Edmund Brocklebank	18,596	62.5	―13.1
Labour	Arthur Moody	11,155	37.5	+13.1
Majority		7,441	25.0	―26.2
Turnout		29,751	61.7	―10.8
Conservative hold		Swing	―13.1	

General Election 1939–40: Another General Election was required to take place before the end of 1940. The political parties had been making preparations for an election to take place and by the Autumn of 1939, the following candidates had been selected;

- Conservative: Edmund Brocklebank
- Labour: Arthur Moody

=== Elections in the 1940s ===
General election 1945: Liverpool Fairfield
Party	Candidate	Votes	%	±%
Labour	Arthur Moody	14,475	45.7	+18.2
Conservative	Edmund Brocklebank	13,328	42.2	―20.3
Liberal	William Henry Ledsom	3,816	12.1	New
Majority		1,147	3.5	N/A
Turnout		31,619	65.8	+4.1
Labour gain from Conservative		Swing	+19.2	
