= John Grayson (cricketer) =

English cricketer

Personal information
- Full name: John Hubert FitzHenry Grayson
- Born: 17 June 1871; West Derby, Lancashire, England
- Died: 31 May 1936 (aged 64); Eastbourne, Sussex, England
- Batting: Right-handed
- Bowling: Right-arm medium
- Relatives: Henry Grayson (brother)

Career statistics
Competition	First-class
Matches	2
Runs scored	46
Batting average	11.50
100s/50s	–/–
Top score	36
Balls bowled	–
Wickets	–
Bowling average	–
5 wickets in innings	–
10 wickets in match	–
Best bowling	–
Catches/stumpings	–/–
- Source: Cricinfo, 4 January 2015

John Hubert FitzHenry Grayson (17 June 1871 – 31 May 1936) was an English cricketer active in the early 1890s. Born in West Derby, Lancashire (now Liverpool), Grayson was a right-handed batsman and right-arm medium pace bowler who made two appearances in first-class cricket.

Educated at Radley College and playing his club cricket for Birkenhead Park, Grayson made his debut in first-class cricket for Liverpool and District against Yorkshire in 1891 at Aigburth. He played a second first-class match for Liverpool and District in 1893 against the touring Australians. He made a highest score of 36 in first-class cricket, which came against Yorkshire.

He died at Eastbourne, Sussex on 31 May 1936. His brother Henry also played first-class cricket.
