= Henry Grayson =

British politician

Lieutenant-Colonel Sir Henry Grayson Bt KBE KStJ

Member of Parliament for Birkenhead
- In office 1918–1922
- Preceded by: New constituency
- Succeeded by: William Henry Stott

Director of Ship Repairs (Home), Admiralty
- In office 1916–1919

Personal details
- Born: Henry Mulleneux Grayson; 26 June 1865 Birkenhead, Cheshire, England
- Died: 27 October 1951 (aged 86)
- Spouses: Dora Beatrice Harrington (m. 1891; div. 1927) Louise Mary Delany (after 1927)
- Children: 12
- Education: Winchester College

Lieutenant-Colonel Sir Henry Mulleneux Grayson, 1st Baronet, KBE, KStJ (26 June 1865 – 27 October 1951) was an English shipbuilder.

== Early life ==
Grayson was born on 26 June 1865 in Birkenhead and was the son of Henry Holdrege Grayson and Elizabeth (née Mulleneux) Grayson. He was educated at Winchester College and later played first-class cricket for Liverpool and District against Nottinghamshire in 1889 and Yorkshire in 1890, scoring 66 runs at an average of 16.50, with a high score of 42. His brother John was also a first-class cricketer.

== Career ==
He entered the family shipbuilding and ship-repairing firm, H. & C. Grayson Ltd, which had been founded on the River Mersey in 1760 and of which his father was managing director. He succeeded his father on the latter's death in 1904 and was also managing director of the Garston Graving Dock & Shipbuilding Co Ltd.

In 1914 he became a member of the Shipbuilders' Advisory Committee to the Admiralty, and in 1916 was appointed Director of Ship Repairs (Home), a post he held until 1919, with a commission in the Royal Marines. For this work he was appointed Commander of the Order of the British Empire (CBE) in 1920, and Knight Commander of the Order of the British Empire (KBE) later that year, and created a baronet in the 1922 New Year Honours.

In 1918 he was elected to Parliament as Conservative member for Birkenhead West and served until 1922 when he was succeeded by William Henry Stott.

He lived on Anglesey, of which he was High Sheriff for 1917. From 1939 to 1945 he was chairman of the Anglesey Joint War Organisation and the North Wales Regional Council and commissioner of the St John Ambulance Brigade for Anglesey.

== Personal life ==
He was twice married. His first marriage was to Dora Beatrice Harrington, daughter of Frederick Harrington, on 16 April 1891. Before their divorce in 1927, they were the parents of twelve children, including:

- Monica Sheila Harrington Grayson (d. 1958), who married Edward FitzClarence, 6th Earl of Munster and was the mother of Anthony FitzClarence, 7th Earl of Munster.
- Alisa Margaret Harrington Grayson, who married Lt.-Col. A. R. Rawlinson and was the mother of Peter Rawlinson, Baron Rawlinson of Ewell.
- Nancy Doreen Harrington Grayson (1899–1962), who married Louis Clapier Norris Drexel, son of Anthony Joseph Drexel Jr.
- Auriol Dora Harrington Grayson, who married Walter Bruce Harvie, son of J. W. Harvie.
- Meryl Loraine Harrington Grayson
- Angela Decima Harrington Grayson, who married Vincent Luis Dominguez. They divorced in 1946 and she remarried to C. Mathews Dick.
- Sir Denys Henry Harrington Grayson, 2nd Baronet (1892–1955), who married Elsie May Jones, daughter of Richard Davies Jones. They divorced in 1927 and he married Sylvia Ironside Keown-Boyd, daughter of Richard Keown-Boyd, in 1927. They divorced in 1937 and he married, thirdly, to Jeannette Glen, daughter of John Evan Glen. He was the father of Sir Ronald Grayson, 3rd Baronet.
- Sir Rupert Stanley Harrington Grayson, 4th Baronet (1897–1991), a writer and composer who married Victoria Florence Banks, daughter of Walter Henry Banks, in 1919. He married, secondly, to Vari Colette O'Shea, daughter of Major Henry O'Shea.
- Brian Harrington Grayson (1900–1989), who married, firstly, Sofia Buchanan, daughter of George Buchanan. After their 1946 divorce, he remarried to Ruth Anders, daughter of Oscar Louis Anders in 1949. He was the father of Sir Jeremy Grayson, 5th Baronet.
- Tristram Hugh Harrington Grayson (1902–1984), who married Barbara Finucane, daughter of Morgan Ignatius Finucane.
- Ambrose Desmond Harrington Grayson (b. 1913), a twin who married Lilian Potter, daughter of Gerald Westwood Potter.
- Godfrey Ramsay Harrington Grayson (b. 1913), a twin who married Ida Nannestad Hassing, daughter of Sextus Hassing.

His second marriage was to Louise Mary Delany, daughter of Richard John Delaney, on 20 December 1927.

Grayson died on 27 October 1951.

Parliament of the United Kingdom
New constituency	Member of Parliament for Birkenhead West; 1918–1922	Succeeded by William Henry Stott
Baronetage of the United Kingdom
New creation	Baronet (of Ravenspoint); 1922–1951	Succeeded by Denys Grayson
