= Brunel Cohen =

British politician (1886–1965)

- Cohen in 1928
- Born: Benn Jack Brunel Cohen; 5 October 1886; Toxteth, Liverpool, England
- Died: 11 May 1965 (aged 78); London, England
- Education: Cheltenham College
- Political party: Conservative
- Spouse: Vera Evelyn Samuel (m. 1914)
- Children: 3

Major Sir Benn Jack Brunel Cohen KBE (5 October 1886 – 11 May 1965) was a British Conservative Party politician and campaigner on behalf of disabled people. He was Member of Parliament (MP) for Liverpool Fairfield for 13 years, from 1918 to 1931.

== Early life ==
Cohen was born in Toxteth Park, Liverpool, where his father, Louis Cohen, was a businessman and Conservative local politician. His family owned the Lewis's department stores, which Cohen's father ran after the death of David Lewis. Both of his grandfathers were politicians in New South Wales.

He was educated at Cheltenham College, and then joined the family business. He married Vera Evelyn Samuel in 1914, becoming the son-in-law of Sir Stuart Samuel, 1st Baronet. They had three children: two sons and a daughter.

== War service ==
Cohen volunteered for military service in 1906, joining a territorial battalion of the King's Liverpool Regiment. He served with the battalion after the outbreak of the First World War, but remained in the depot in Liverpool until 1917. Meanwhile, two elder brothers joined the regiment on the Western Front in France, where one was killed in action and the second was gassed. At his own request, Cohen was sent to France in early 1917. He was promoted to major in June 1917, but was wounded at the Third Battle of Ypres, and both legs were amputated above the knee. He used an electric wheelchair for most of his life afterwards.

== Political career ==
Cohen was elected as MP for Liverpool Fairfield in December 1918, and remained in office until he stood down at the 1931 general election. His maiden speech in February 1919 was on the needs of disabled former servicemen, and he devoted much of his time to advancing the cause of disabled people, particular the war wounded, including problems of employment, training and war pensions.

He was involved in the discussions which led to the founding of the British Legion in 1921, and served as its honorary treasurer from 1921 to 1930, then as vice-chairman from 1930 to 1932, and again as honorary treasurer until 1946. He was effectively the parliamentary representative of the British Legion. He also served on the board of the Poppy Factory in Richmond, as a member of the council of St Dunstan's for 40 years, and as a governor of St Thomas' Hospital for 33 years.

He advocated rapprochement after the First World War between the former enemy nations, and spoke at the first International Conference of the Fédération Interalliée des Anciens Combattants in New Orleans in 1922. He visited Austria, Hungary, and Czechoslovakia in the 1930s.

Cohen served as an army welfare officer for the Auxiliary Territorial Service in the Second World War. He chaired the Ministry of Labour's national advisory council on employment for disabled people, which spurred the passing of the Disabled Persons (Employment) Act 1944, mandating employers to give jobs to disabled people. He became vice-chairman of Remploy in 1946, and its chairman in 1955.

He was active in Jewish affairs, but was not a Zionist. He was the founding president of the anti-Zionist Jewish Fellowship from 1944 until it was dissolved after the foundation of Israel in 1948. He was also a member of the council of Cheltenham College.

He received a knighthood in 1943, and was appointed a KBE in 1948. He published an autobiography, Count Your Blessings, in 1956.

He was the subject of This Is Your Life in 1961 when he was surprised by Eamonn Andrews.

He died in London, with a memorial service at the West London Synagogue.

Parliament of the United Kingdom
| New constituency | Member of Parliament for Liverpool Fairfield; 1918–1931 | Succeeded by Edmund Brocklebank |
