= Vincent Watts =

British academic and businessman

Vincent Challacombe Watts OBE (born 11 August 1940) is a British academic and businessman.

He was educated at Sidcot School, Peterhouse, Cambridge (MA, Molecular Biology), and at the University of Birmingham (MSc). He served as vice-chancellor of the University of East Anglia from 1997 to 2002, leaving to focus full-time on his role as Chairman of the East of England Development Agency. Prior to joining the University of East Anglia he was at Andersen Consulting.
