= Birkenhead West =

Parliamentary constituency in the United Kingdom, 1918–1950

- Former borough constituency for the House of Commons

1918–1950
- Seats: one
- Created from: Birkenhead and Wirral
- Replaced by: Birkenhead

Birkenhead West was a parliamentary constituency that returned one Member of Parliament (MP) to the House of Commons of the Parliament of the United Kingdom, elected by the first past the post voting system.

== History ==
The constituency was created by the Representation of the People Act 1918 for the 1918 general election when the Parliamentary Borough of Birkenhead was split between the East and West Divisions.

It was abolished by the Representation of the People Act 1948 for the 1950 general election, when it was included in the reconstituted constituency of Birkenhead.

== Boundaries ==
The County Borough of Birkenhead wards of Claughton, Cleveland, Grange, and Oxton.

== Members of Parliament ==
Election	Member	Party
1918	Sir Henry Grayson	Conservative
1922	William Henry Stott	Conservative
1923	William Henry Egan	Labour
1924	Ellis Nuttall	Conservative
1929	William Henry Egan	Labour
1931	John Sandeman Allen	Conservative
1945	Percy Collick	Labour
1950	constituency abolished: see Birkenhead	

== Elections ==
=== Election in the 1910s ===
General election 1918: Birkenhead West
Party		Candidate	Votes	%
C	Unionist	Henry Grayson	10,881	59.43
	Labour	William Henry Egan	5,673	30.98
	Liberal	Harold Bickersteth	1,755	9.59
Majority			5,208	28.45
Turnout			18,309	60.89
Registered electors			30,068	
	Unionist win (new seat)			
C indicates candidate endorsed by the coalition government.

=== Elections in the 1920s ===
General election 1922: Birkenhead West
Party	Candidate	Votes	%	±%
Unionist	William Henry Stott	12,176	54.00	−5.43
Labour	William Henry Egan	10,371	46.00	+15.02
Majority		1,805	8.00	−20.45
Turnout		22,547	75.55	+14.66
Registered electors		29,843		
Unionist hold		Swing	−10.23	

General election 1923: Birkenhead West
Party	Candidate	Votes	%	±%
Labour	William Henry Egan	12,473	55.85	+9.85
Unionist	William Henry Stott	9,862	44.15	−9.85
Majority		2,611	11.70	N/A
Turnout		22,335	72.42	−3.13
Registered electors		30,841		
Labour gain from Unionist		Swing	+9.85	

General election 1924: Birkenhead West
Party	Candidate	Votes	%	±%
Unionist	Ellis Nuttall	13,059	50.65	+6.50
Labour	William Henry Egan	12,723	49.35	−6.50
Majority		336	1.30	N/A
Turnout		25,782	81.14	+8.72
Registered electors		31,774		
Unionist gain from Labour		Swing	+6.50	

General election 1929: Birkenhead West
Party	Candidate	Votes	%	±%
Labour	William Henry Egan	15,634	46.00	−3.35
Unionist	Ellis Nuttall	13,410	39.45	−11.20
Liberal	RP Fletcher	4,946	14.55	New
Majority		2,224	6.55	N/A
Turnout		33,990	79.47	−1.67
Registered electors		42,773		
Labour gain from Unionist		Swing	+3.93	

=== Elections in the 1930s ===
General election 1931: Birkenhead West
Party	Candidate	Votes	%	±%
Conservative	John Sandeman Allen	22,336	63.78	+24.33
Labour	William Henry Egan	12,682	36.22	−9.78
Majority		9,654	27.56	N/A
Turnout		35,018	82.20	+2.73
Registered electors		42,600		
Conservative gain from Labour		Swing	+17.06	

General election 1935: Birkenhead West
Party	Candidate	Votes	%	±%
Conservative	John Sandeman Allen	17,684	55.94	−7.84
Labour	C McVey	13,931	44.06	+7.84
Majority		3,753	11.88	−15.72
Turnout		31,615	74.71	−7.49
Registered electors		42,316		
Conservative hold		Swing	−7.84	

=== Election in the 1940s ===
General election 1945: Birkenhead West
Party	Candidate	Votes	%	±%
Labour	Percy Collick	15,568	57.32	+13.26
Conservative	AR Moody	11,591	42.68	−13.26
Majority		3,977	14.64	N/A
Turnout		27,159	75.12	+0.41
Registered electors		36,156		
Labour gain from Conservative		Swing	+13.26	

== See also ==
- History of parliamentary constituencies and boundaries in Cheshire
