= Sidcot School =

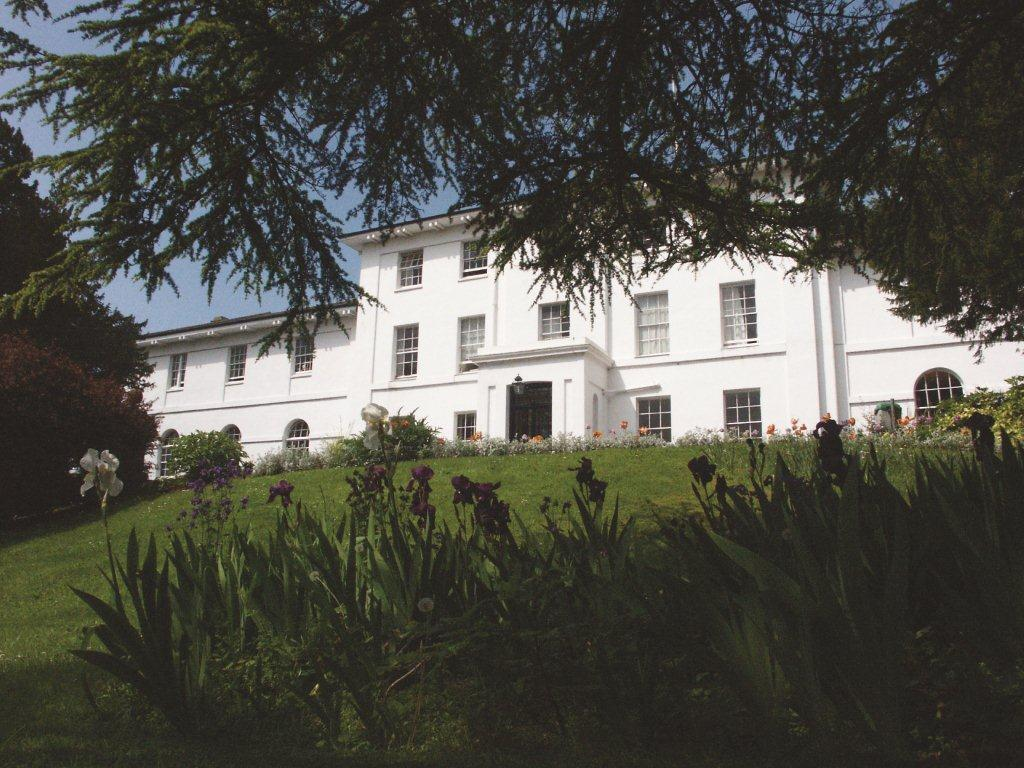

Location
- Oakridge Lane; Winscombe, North Somerset; England; 51.314°N 2.821°W

Information
- Type: Private school Boarding and day school
- Motto: Sic Vos Non Vobis (Thus do ye, but not for yourselves)
- Religious affiliations: Religious Society of Friends (Quaker)
- Established: 1699
- Headmaster: James Jones
- Age: 3 to 18
- Enrolment: 650
- Website: http://www.sidcot.org.uk

Sidcot School is a British co-educational private school for boarding and day pupils, associated with the Religious Society of Friends. It is one of seven Quaker schools in England. The school is in the Mendip Hills near the village of Winscombe, Somerset and accepts children between the ages of 3 and 18. Children aged from 3 to 11 are educated in Sidcot Junior School, which is located on its own site next to the main campus. About 130 of the school's 525 pupils (2010) are in this junior school.

Although a Quaker School, pupils come from a variety of different faiths and cultures. All pupils are expected to join in with a short Meeting for Worship every Friday morning instead of assembly.

In the senior school, nearly half of the 395 pupils are boarders. Over 29 different countries are represented, making up 25% of the school. There are six boarding houses. Until September 2013, Sidcot School had a three-house system named after explorers: Nansen, Shackleton and Rhodes. A new House system was introduced at the beginning of the 2013 Autumn term.

In addition to a sports centre with a 25m pool and equestrian facilities, Sidcot has a creative arts block, with drama, art and music facilities, which opened in June 2009. It is open to the public for exhibitions, courses and workshops.

== History ==
The first Quaker school was established at Winscombe in 1699 to teach boys of Quaker families. The current school reopened in 1808 and welcomed girls, making Sidcot one of the oldest co-educational boarding schools in the UK - although it was not until the late 19th century that they were all taught together.

== Notable former pupils ==
The school has an alumni network. Notable Sidcot Old Scholars include:

- Charlie Albone an English/Australian TV presenter
- Tim Bevan, film producer
- Percy Bigland, portrait painter
- Mary Brazier, neuroscientist
- Nick Broomfield, documentary film maker
- Edward Theodore Compton, landscape painter
- Robin Cowling, English rugby union player
- Aldo van Eyck, Dutch Modernist architect and city planner (1932–1935)
- Mary Fulbrook, academic and historian
- Charles Gilpin, MP
- Charles Handley-Read, architectural historian
- Douglas Macmillan, British civil servant, and founder of the Macmillan Cancer Support charity.
- George Newman, first Chief Medical Officer
- Peter Openshaw, CBE, immunologist
- Stephen Peet, documentary film maker
- Brian Priestman, conductor
- Robert Millner Shackleton, Professor of Geology
- Homer Sykes, photographer
- Mary Tregear, art historian
- Anthony Waller, film director (Mute Witness, An American Werewolf in Paris)
- Zoë Wanamaker, American-born English actress
- Deborah Warner, stage and film director
- Anthony Brian Watts, Professor of Marine Geology and Geophysics
- Vincent Watts, Vice-Chancellor of the University of East Anglia (1997–2002)
- Justin Webb, journalist and presenter, BBC Radio 4's Today programme.

== See also ==
- List of Friends Schools
