= William Henry Stott =

British Army officer, ship owner and Conservative Party politician

Lieutenant-Colonel William Henry Stott CB TD (1863 – 30 December 1930) was a British Army officer, ship owner and Conservative Party politician.

Stott was born in Rock Ferry, Cheshire, the son of shipowner William Henry Stott, Sr. He was educated at Southport, Fairfield College, Manchester, and in Germany. He was made a partner in his father's ship brokerage firm, W. H. Stott and Co., Ltd, which managed the Stott line of steamers trading to the Baltic, a firm founded by his father. In 1894, he became managing director following his father's death.

In 1891, Stott entered the Territorial Force, joining the King's Regiment (Liverpool) Territorial Force. He was awarded the Territorial Decoration in 1912. In the First World War, he became commanding officer of the Liverpool Regiment and accompanied his unit to France when it was deployed in 1915. He was invested as a Companion of the Order of the Bath in the 1917 New Year Honours.

Stott was a Member of Parliament (MP) for Birkenhead West from 1922 to 1923, and for Birkenhead East from 1924 to 1929.

In 1893, he married Christine Brunfeldt Martin, with whom he had a son and five daughters. He died in Rock Ferry in 1930.

Parliament of the United Kingdom
Preceded by Sir Henry Grayson	Member of Parliament for Birkenhead West; 1922–1923	Succeeded by William Henry Egan
Preceded by Graham White	Member of Parliament for Birkenhead East; 1924–1929	Succeeded by Graham White
