= Percy Bigland =

English portrait painter

- Born: 1858; Birkenhead
- Died: 1926 (aged 68); Jordans, Buckinghamshire
- Education: Sidcot School
- Known for: Portrait, genre and landscape painting
- Notable work: W. E. Gladstone (1809–1898)
- Father: Edwin Bigland
- Relatives: Alfred Bigland (brother)

Percy Bigland (1858–1926) was an English portrait painter.

== Life ==
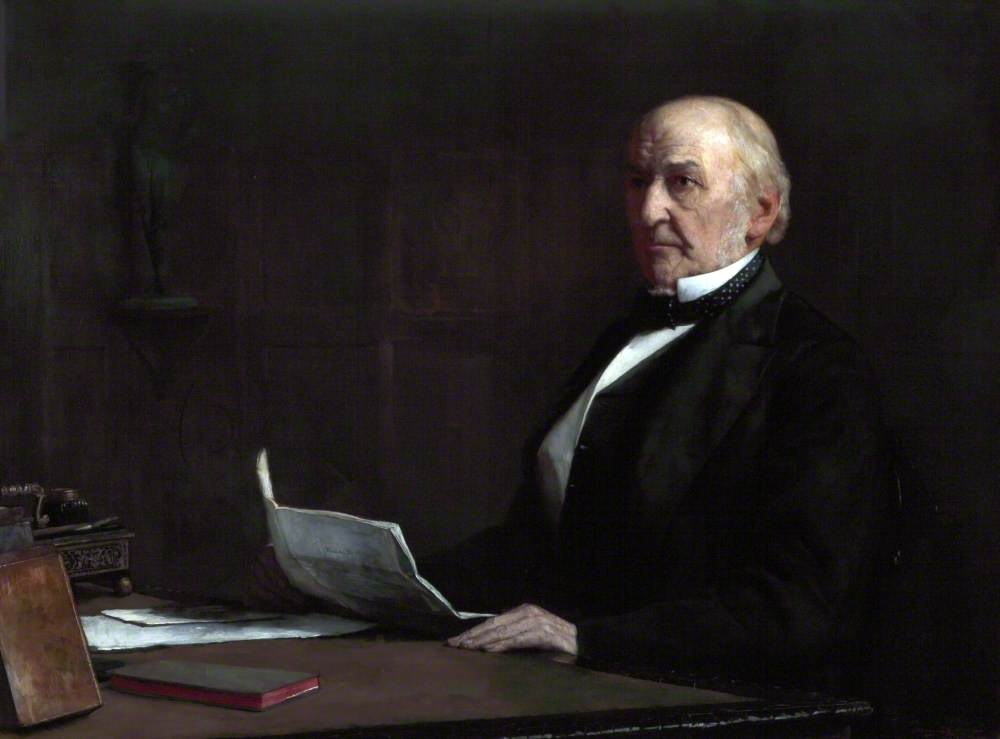
W. E. Gladstone (1809–1898), Percy Bigland, 1890, hung in the Walker Art Gallery

Bigland was the son of Edwin Bigland, of Birkenhead in 1856. He was educated like his brother at the Sidcot School as his family were Quakers. Bigland studied art in Munich in Germany for seven years before returning to England where he lived in London, Liverpool, Beaconsfield and Buckinghamshire. He was a regular exhibitor until 1925 at institutions in London and the provinces.

Bigland painted his elder brother, Alfred Bigland who was an M.P. This portrait is in the Williamson Art Gallery in Birkenhead. His most notable subject was the Prime Minister Gladstone, but he also went to America three times to include the department store owner Isaac H Clothier, Swarthmore College dean Elizabeth Powell Bond and landowner and philanthropist William Poole Bancroft in his list of sitters.

In 1891 he was elected to the Royal Society of Portrait Painters in 1891 and in 1893 he painted Elizabeth Hanbury who was then 100 years old.

Bigland died aged 68 in 1926.

== Legacy ==
Bigland has twenty paintings in British national collections.
