= Judith Kilpatrick =

- Born: Judith Ann Gladys Foxley; 20 February 1952; St Helens, Lancashire, England
- Died: 5 September 2002 (aged 50); Portsmouth, Hampshire, England
- Occupation: Headteacher
- Years active: 1974–2002

Dame Judith Ann Gladys Kilpatrick, DBE (née Foxley; 20 February 1952 – 5 September 2002) was an English head teacher who was noted for her work in the improvements in examination results at the City of Portsmouth Girls' School (now Portsmouth Academy) which led to the school acquiring advanced training school status in 2002. She first entered the teaching profession in 1974 at Regent Park's Girls School and went on to serve as a Liaison officer for schools in industry for South East Hampshire from 1987 to 1989. Kilpatrick later moved to Portsmouth where she had the deputy headship of the King Richard School and was appointed to the post of headmistress for the first time in her career in 1993 at The Wavell School.

She moved back to Portsmouth in 1995 and was appointed the new headmistress of the City of Portsmouth Girls' School and sought to achieve high standards from her students and colleagues. Kilpatrick was instrumental in persuading other schools to share teachers with challenging schools in an effort to improve standards and deliver a high-quality education. In her later years, she was a member of various quangos which included the Home Office Advisory Committee on the Misuse of Drugs and served on the executive council of the Teacher Training Agency. Kilpatrick also represented the National Association of Head Teachers on the Portsmouth educational committee. After her death, she posthumously won a lifetime achievement award and a road was named in her honour.

== Biography ==
=== Early life and career ===
Kilpatrick was born Judith Ann Gladys Foxley at St. Helen's Hospital in St Helens, Lancashire on 20 February 1952. Her family's ancestors were traditionally employed in the mines. Kilpatrick was the only child of James "Jim" Foxley, who was a treasurer for Bury Health Authority, and later worked for the National Health Service. Her mother's name was Kathleen Alice, née Kingdon. Kilpatrick was educated at the Cowley Grammar School for Girls and later went to the University of Kent. After graduation, she took a Postgraduate Certificate in Education at the University of Southampton and thus qualified as a teacher. The remainder of Kilpatrick's working life was spent on or near the South Coast of England but did not lose her northern accent.

Her first job was as a teacher of English, history and integrated studies at Regent Park's Girls School from 1974 to 1985. Kilpatrick then completed an additional year as head of careers at the school and later served a stint as a liaison officer for schools and industry in South East Hampshire between 1987 and 1989. She later moved to Portsmouth where she was made the deputy headteacher of the King Richard School in the city's Paulsgrove district. Kilpatrick's first job as the headmistress of a school came four years later at The Wavell School in Farmborough. She married Andrew Kilpatrick, a fellow headteacher, on 22 October 1994, after Andrew divorced.

In 1995, Kilpatrick returned to Portsmouth and was appointed the new headmistress of the City of Portsmouth Girls' School (now Portsmouth Academy). There she sought to achieve high standards from her students and colleagues and the school's General Certificate of Secondary Education (GCSE) results became the best in the immediate area, and better than most schools in the area that struggled with the issues originating from a disadvantaged neighbourhood. Kilpatrick was instrumental in persuading other schools to share teachers with challenging schools which was an idea she created to improve standards and deliver a high-quality education. She supported single-sex education and scorned suggestions that children are less socially developed by going to a same-sex school.

Her success and work at the school was noticed by the incoming Labour government after the victory in the 1997 general election. Good practice in the inner cities was keen to be replicated by the government and singled out the City of Portsmouth Girls' School as their best example. The school was awarded Beacon Status in 2000 which identified it as "an exceptionally good school" and the award allowed them to exchange their expertise with other schools. In June that year, Kilpatrick became the second teacher to become a dame in the Queen's Birthday's Honours list for "services to education". She said of the decision to appoint her a DBE,

I'm absolutely thrilled to bits. It reflects well on all my colleagues, and that's the important thing. You don't get these sat in your office, you get them working with colleagues … Schools are about partnerships. It's about trusting your staff. Setting the parameters against which we're going to work, but then trusting people to do that—monitoring, supporting, and generally working with colleagues not above colleagues.

The City of Portsmouth Girls' School was awarded training school status in 2001 and was given advanced training school status the following year which recognised its expertise in recruiting and retaining staff through "excellent initial teacher training and continuing professional development". Additionally, the school trained current and prospective middle managers and classroom assistants who were among the non-teaching staff involved in this scheme. Kilpatrick was a member of various quangos: she joined the Home Office advisory committee on the misuse on drugs in March 2002, and was appointed to the executive council of the Teacher Training Agency four months later. She also represented the National Association of Head Teachers on the Portsmouth educational committee, and this brought her to national attention. Kilpatrick was also a member of the Southern Strategic Partnership, the Wessex Partnership and the Portsmouth Lifelong Learning Partnership.

=== Death and legacy ===
Acting as the director of a teacher training session at the start of the autumn term of the 2002/2003 school year on 5 September, she collapsed mid-sentence as a result of a ruptured thoracic aneurysm. Kilpatrick never regained consciousness, and died that same day at the Queen Alexandra Hospital in Portsmouth in spite of not having any previous illnesses. She was survived by her two stepchildren; in 1998, she had divorced their father, Andrew Kelvin Kilpatrick, a headteacher whom she had married in 1994. On 17 September, Kilpatrick's funeral took place in Portsmouth and was cremated. A memorial service to celebrate her life was held three days later. Kilpatrick was posthumously given a lifetime achievement award in a ceremony organised by The News on 25 November. In 2014, a development of 46 homes in Cosham was named Dame Judith Way in her honour and a plaque was also unveiled in her memory.
