= 1943 Portsmouth North by-election =

UK Parliamentary by-election

← 1935	16 February 1943	1945 →

Constituency of Portsmouth North
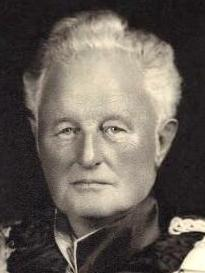
	First party	Second party
		CW
Candidate	William James	Thomas Sargant
Party	Conservative	Common Wealth
Popular vote	6,735	4,545
Percentage	59.7%	40.3%
MP before election
Roger Keyes
Conservative
Elected MP
William James
Conservative

The 1943 Portsmouth North by-election was held on 16 February 1943. The by-election was held due to the elevation to the peerage of the incumbent Conservative MP, Sir Roger Keyes. It was won by the Conservative candidate William Milbourne James.

Portsmouth North by-election, 1943
Party	Candidate	Votes	%	±%
Conservative	William James	6,735	59.7	−6.9
Common Wealth	Thomas Sargant	4,545	40.3	N/A
Majority		2,190	19.4	−13.8
Turnout		11,280		
Conservative hold		Swing		
