= Portsmouth North =

UK Parliament constituency (since 1974)

Coordinates: 50.83°N 1.07°W

- Borough constituency for the House of Commons
- Boundaries since 2010
- Boundary of Portsmouth North in South East England
- County: Hampshire
- Electorate: 71,844 (2023)
- Major settlements: Cosham; Hilsea; Farlington

Current constituency
- Created: 1974
- Member of Parliament: Amanda Martin (Labour)
- Seats: One
- Created from: Portsmouth West; Portsmouth Langstone

1918–1950
- Seats: One
- Type of constituency: Borough constituency
- Created from: Portsmouth
- Replaced by: Portsmouth West (Bulk); Portsmouth Langstone (Part)

Portsmouth North is a constituency (Note: A borough constituency (for the purposes of election expenses and type of returning officer)) represented in the House of Commons of the UK Parliament by Amanda Martin of the Labour Party since 2024. (Note: As with all constituencies, the constituency elects one Member of Parliament (MP) by the first past the post system of election at least every five years.)

== Constituency profile ==
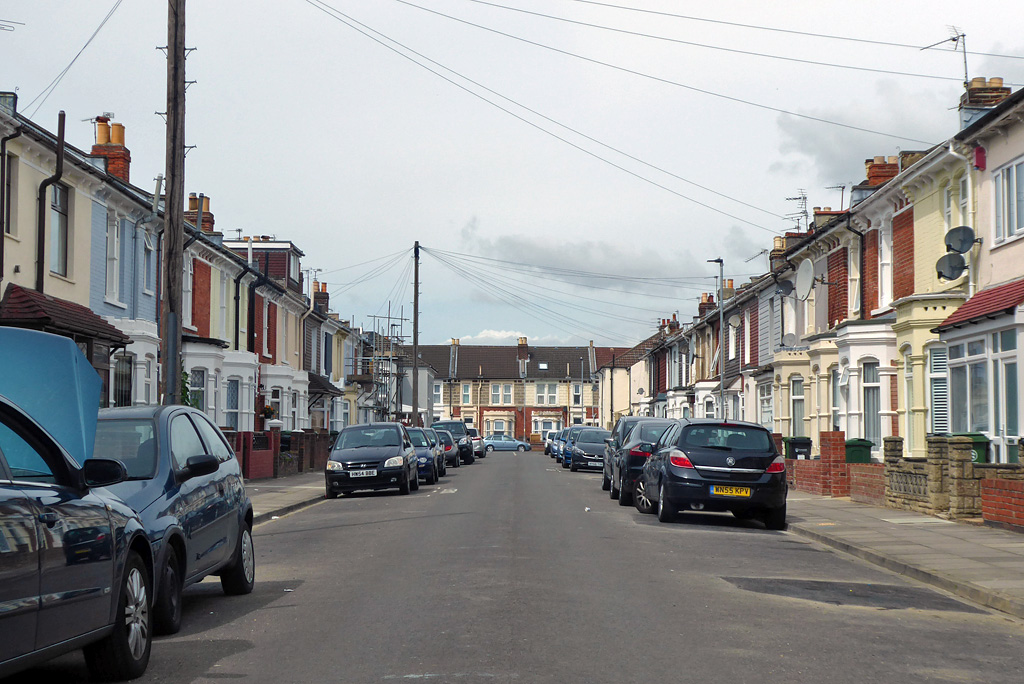
Epworth Road, Copnor

Portsmouth North is a constituency in Hampshire in South East England. It covers the northern half of Portsea Island and the mainland areas of the city of Portsmouth. This includes the neighbourhoods of Baffins, Copnor, Stamshaw, Hilsea, Paulsgrove, Wymering, Cosham, Drayton and Farlington.

Portsmouth is a port city with a maritime history. Its importance as a naval base and centre for shipbuilding made it the most heavily fortified city in the world in the early 19th century. Within this constituency, the neighbourhoods on Portsea Island (Baffins, Copnor, Stamshaw and Hilsea) mostly feature dense Edwardian and interwar terraced housing, whilst the mainland suburbs were developed more recently as the city expanded. The neighbourhoods in the west like Stamshaw and Paulsgrove, the latter of which was built as a large council estate, are highly-deprived. The north-eastern suburbs of Drayton and Farlington are affluent in comparison, giving the constituency an average level of wealth overall. House prices across the constituency are generally lower than the UK average and considerably lower than the regional average.

Portsmouth North has a similar age profile to the rest of the country, although there are more middle-aged adults and a lower proportion of retirees. Residents' rates of income, homeownership and child poverty are in line with UK averages. They have below-average levels of education and a high proportion work in the health and manufacturing sectors. The percentage claiming unemployment benefits is similar to the country as a whole. White people made up 90% of residents at the 2021 census.

At the local city council, the neighbourhoods closer to the city centre are represented by Liberal Democrats, the wealthy north-eastern suburbs by Conservatives and the rest of the constituency by localists and Reform UK. Voters in Portsmouth North strongly supported leaving the European Union in the 2016 referendum; an estimated 64% voted in favour of Brexit compared to the UK-wide figure of 52%.

== Boundaries and boundary changes ==
As its name suggests, the constituency covers the northern portion of the city of Portsmouth in Hampshire.

Dates	Local authority	Maps	Wards
1918–1950	County Borough of Portsmouth		Charles Dickens, Mile End, North End, and Portsea.
1974–1983	County Borough of Portsmouth		Cosham, Farlington, Meredith, Nelson, North End, Paulsgrove, Portsea, and St Mary and Guildhall.
1983–1997	City of Portsmouth; Borough of Havant		City of Portsmouth wards of Copnor, Cosham, Drayton and Farlington, Hilsea, Nelson, and Paulsgrove, and the Borough of Havant wards of Purbrook and Stakes.
1997–2010	City of Portsmouth		Copnor, Cosham, Drayton and Farlington, Hilsea, Nelson, and Paulsgrove.
2010–present	City of Portsmouth		Baffins, Copnor, Cosham, Drayton and Farlington, Hilsea, Nelson, and Paulsgrove.

=== 1918–1950 ===
The constituency was formed from splitting the existing of constituency Portsmouth

=== Abolition ===
After the First periodic review of Westminster constituencies, the Cosham and Meredith ward forming part of the new constituency of Portsmouth Langstone, while the rest formed the new constituency of Portsmouth West.

=== 1974–1983 ===
The constituency was reformed from the abolished constituencies of Portsmouth West and Portsmouth Langstone

=== 1983–1997 ===
Portsea, and St Mary and Guildhall wards were transferred to Portsmouth South with Purbrook and Stakes transferred from the abolished constituency of Havant and Waterloo.

=== 1997–2010 ===
Purbrook and Stakes were transferred to Havant

=== 2010–present ===
Ward boundary changes and renaming

The 2023 Periodic Review of Westminster constituencies left the boundaries unchanged.

== History ==
The constituency was created in 1918 when the two-seat Portsmouth constituency was split into three divisions: Central, North and South.

It was abolished for the 1950 general election and largely replaced by a new Portsmouth West constituency as the axis of division changed, but was re-established for the February 1974 general election.

== Members of Parliament ==
=== MPs 1918–1950 ===
Portsmouth prior to 1918

Election	Member	Party	Notes
1918	Sir Bertram Falle, Bt.	Conservative	Member for Portsmouth (1910–1918)
1934 by-election	Admiral Sir Roger Keyes	Conservative	Elevated to the peerage as Baron Keyes in January 1943
1943 by-election	Admiral Sir William James	Conservative	
1945	Donald Bruce	Labour	Contested Portsmouth West following redistribution
1950	constituency abolished: see Portsmouth West and Portsmouth Langstone		

=== MPs since 1974 ===
Portsmouth West and Portsmouth Langstone prior to 1974

Election	Member	Party	Notes
Feb 1974	Frank Judd	Labour	Member for Portsmouth West (1966–1974)
1979	Peter Griffiths	Conservative	Member for Smethwick (1964–1966)
1997	Syd Rapson	Labour	
2005	Sarah McCarthy-Fry	Labour Co-operative	Exchequer Secretary to the Treasury (2009–2010)
2010	Penny Mordaunt	Conservative	Secretary of State for International Development (2017–2019); Secretary of State for Defence (2019); Leader of the House of Commons (2022–2024)
2024	Amanda Martin	Labour	

== Elections ==
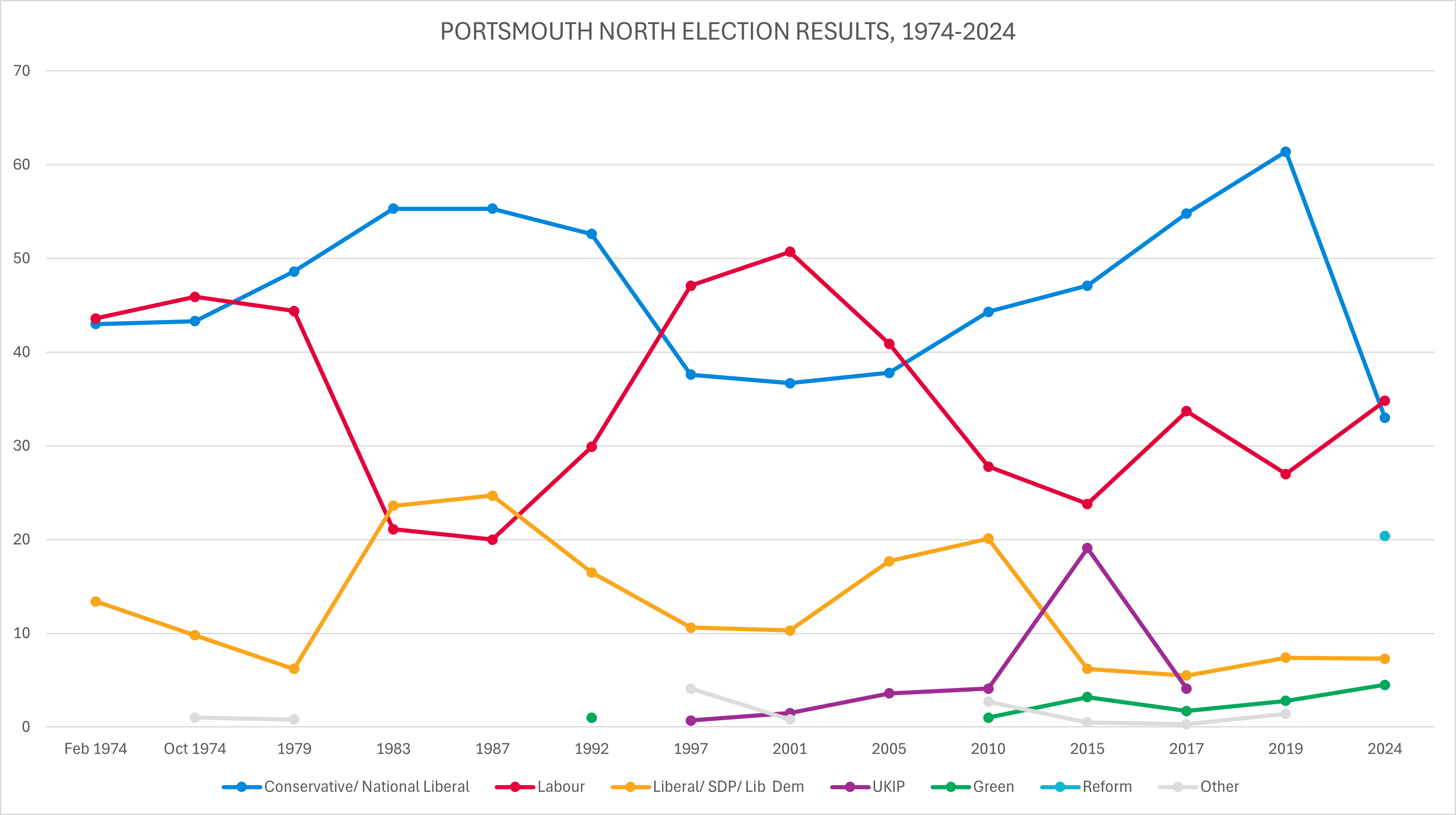
Election results 1950-2024

=== Election in the 1910s ===
General election 1918: Portsmouth North
Party		Candidate	Votes	%
C	Unionist	Bertram Falle	11,427	61.8
	Naval and Lower-Deck	Lionel Yexley*	7,063	38.2
Majority			4,364	23.6
Turnout			18,490	52.3
Registered electors			35,367	
	Unionist win (new seat)			
C indicates candidate endorsed by the coalition government.

* Yexley (real name, James Woods) was supported by the Lower-Deck Parliamentary Committee, and also the local Liberal association.

=== Elections in the 1920s ===
General election 1922: Portsmouth North
Party	Candidate	Votes	%	±%
Unionist	Bertram Falle	14,168	55.9	−5.9
Labour	Arthur Henderson	6,808	26.9	N/A
Liberal	Thomas Lapthorn	4,368	17.2	N/A
Majority		7,360	29.0	+5.4
Turnout		25,344	71.9	+19.6
Registered electors		35,236		
Unionist hold		Swing	N/A	

General election 1923: Portsmouth North
Party	Candidate	Votes	%	±%
Unionist	Bertram Falle	13,229	50.2	−5.7
Labour	Olaf Gleeson	9,523	36.2	+9.3
Liberal	William Llewellyn Williams	3,584	13.6	−3.6
Majority		3,706	14.0	−15.0
Turnout		26,336	71.7	−0.2
Registered electors		36,717		
Unionist hold		Swing	−7.5	

General election 1924: Portsmouth North
Party	Candidate	Votes	%	±%
Unionist	Bertram Falle	17,597	63.1	+12.9
Labour	Olaf Gleeson	10,279	36.9	+0.7
Majority		7,318	26.2	+12.2
Turnout		27,876	75.0	+3.3
Registered electors		37,168		
Unionist hold		Swing	+6.1	

General election 1929: Portsmouth North
Party	Candidate	Votes	%	±%
Unionist	Bertram Falle	15,352	44.5	−18.6
Labour	Edward Archbold	12,475	36.2	−0.7
Liberal	Archibald Palmer	6,643	19.3	N/A
Majority		2,877	8.3	−27.9
Turnout		34,470	70.8	−4.2
Registered electors		48,688		
Unionist hold		Swing	−9.0	

=== Elections in the 1930s ===
General election 1931: Portsmouth North
Party	Candidate	Votes	%	±%
Conservative	Bertram Falle	26,331	69.37	+24.87
Labour	Kenneth Dewar	12,182	31.63	−4.57
Majority		14,149	36.74	+28.44
Turnout		38,513	74.49	+3.69
Registered electors				
Conservative hold		Swing	+14.87	

1934 Portsmouth North by-election
Party	Candidate	Votes	%	±%
Conservative	Roger Keyes	17,582	59.6	−8.8
Labour	Edward Humby	11,904	40.4	+8.8
Majority		5,678	19.2	−17.5
Turnout		29,486	55.7	−18.79
Registered electors				
Conservative hold		Swing	-8.8	

General election 1935: Portsmouth North
Party	Candidate	Votes	%	±%
Conservative	Roger Keyes	22,956	66.62	+7.02
Labour	Edward Humby	11,502	33.38	−7.02
Majority		11,454	33.24	+14.04
Turnout		34,458	64.86	−9.63
Registered electors				
Conservative hold		Swing	+7.02	

=== Elections in the 1940s ===
1943 Portsmouth North by-election
Party	Candidate	Votes	%	±%
Conservative	William James	6,735	59.7	−6.9
Common Wealth	Thomas Sargant	4,545	40.3	N/A
Majority		2,190	19.4	−13.8
Turnout		11,280		
Registered electors				
Conservative hold		Swing		

General election 1945: Portsmouth North
Party	Candidate	Votes	%	±%
Labour	Donald Bruce	15,352	51.1	+17.8
Conservative	Greville Howard	14,310	47.6	–19.0
Democratic	John Keast	388	1.3	N/A
Majority		1,042	3.5	N/A
Turnout		30,050	75.4	+10.5
Registered electors		39,873		
Labour gain from Conservative		Swing	+18.9	

=== Elections in the 1970s ===
1970 notional result
Party	Vote	%
Conservative	24,000	46.0
Labour	21,500	41.2
Liberal	6,700	12.8
Turnout	52,200	71.3
Electorate	73,238	

General election February 1974: Portsmouth North
Party	Candidate	Votes	%	±%
Labour	Frank Judd	23,847	43.6	+2.4
Conservative	Peter Griffiths	23,527	43.0	–2.9
Liberal	Anthony Peaston	7,304	13.4	+0.5
Majority		320	0.6	N/A
Turnout		54,678	79.9	+8.6
Registered electors		68,473		
Labour gain from Conservative (Notional.)		Swing	+2.7	

General election October 1974: Portsmouth North
Party	Candidate	Votes	%	±%
Labour	Frank Judd	24,352	45.9	+2.3
Conservative	John Ward	23,007	43.3	+0.3
Liberal	Eileen Brooks	5,208	9.8	−3.5
More Prosperous Britain	Tom Keen	527	1.0	N/A
Majority		1,345	2.5	+2.0
Turnout		53,094	76.8	−3.0
Registered electors		69,089		
Labour hold		Swing	+1.0	

General election 1979: Portsmouth North
Party	Candidate	Votes	%	±%
Conservative	Peter Griffiths	26,356	48.6	+5.3
Labour	Frank Judd	24,045	44.4	–1.5
Liberal	S Brewin	3,354	6.2	−3.6
National Front	R Hadlow	298	0.6	N/A
Workers Revolutionary	T White	122	0.2	N/A
Majority		2,311	4.3	N/A
Turnout		54,177	78.7	+1.8
Registered electors		68,870		
Conservative gain from Labour		Swing	+3.4	

1979 notional result
Party	Vote	%
Conservative	30,139	51.4
Labour	23,229	39.6
Liberal	4,922	8.4
Others	381	0.6
Turnout	58,671	
Electorate		

=== Elections in the 1980s ===
General election 1983: Portsmouth North
Party	Candidate	Votes	%	±%
Conservative	Peter Griffiths	31,413	55.3	+3.9
SDP	Stuart Luxon	13,414	23.6	+15.2
Labour	Nigel Beard	12,013	21.1	–18.5
Majority		17,999	31.7	+19.9
Turnout		56,840	72.9	–5.7
Registered electors		77,923		
Conservative hold		Swing	–5.7	

General election 1987: Portsmouth North
Party	Candidate	Votes	%	±%
Conservative	Peter Griffiths	33,297	55.3	+0.0
SDP	Elizabeth Mitchell	14,896	24.7	+1.1
Labour Co-op	David Miles	12,016	20.0	–1.2
Majority		18,401	30.6	–1.1
Turnout		60,209	74.8	+1.8
Registered electors		80,501		
Conservative hold		Swing	–0.6	

=== Elections in the 1990s ===
General election 1992: Portsmouth North
Party	Candidate	Votes	%	±%
Conservative	Peter Griffiths	32,240	52.6	−2.7
Labour	Alan Burnett	18,359	29.9	+10.0
Liberal Democrats	Alex Bentley	10,101	16.5	−8.3
Green	Helen Palmer	628	1.0	N/A
Majority		13,881	22.6	−7.9
Turnout		61,328	77.1	+2.3
Registered electors		79,592		
Conservative hold		Swing	−6.4	

1992 notional result
Party	Vote	%
Conservative	25,368	50.7
Labour	16,610	33.2
Liberal Democrats	7,529	15.1
Green	511	1.0
Turnout	50,018	76.2
Electorate	65,614	

General election 1997: Portsmouth North
Party	Candidate	Votes	%	±%
Labour	Syd Rapson	21,339	47.1	+13.9
Conservative	Peter Griffiths	17,016	37.6	−13.1
Liberal Democrats	Steven Sollitt	4,788	10.6	–4.5
Referendum	Shaun Evelegh	1,757	3.9	N/A
UKIP	Peter Coe	298	0.7	N/A
Wessex Regionalists	Colin Bex	72	0.2	N/A
Majority		4,323	9.5	N/A
Turnout		45,270	70.1	–6.1
Registered electors		64,539		
Labour gain from Conservative		Swing	+13.5	

=== Elections in the 2000s ===
General election 2001: Portsmouth North
Party	Candidate	Votes	%	±%
Labour	Syd Rapson	18,676	50.7	+3.5
Conservative	Christopher Day	13,542	36.7	−0.9
Liberal Democrats	Darren Sanders	3,795	10.3	−0.3
UKIP	William McCabe	559	1.5	+0.9
Independent	Brian Bundy	294	0.8	N/A
Majority		5,134	13.9	+4.4
Turnout		36,866	57.4	−12.8
Registered electors		64,256		
Labour hold		Swing	+2.2	

General election 2005: Portsmouth North
Party	Candidate	Votes	%	±%
Labour Co-op	Sarah McCarthy-Fry	15,412	40.9	−9.8
Conservative	Penny Mordaunt	14,273	37.8	+1.1
Liberal Democrats	Gary Lawson	6,684	17.7	+7.4
UKIP	Mike Smith	1,348	3.6	+2.1
Majority		1,139	3.0	−10.9
Turnout		37,717	60.0	+2.6
Registered electors		62,884		
Labour hold		Swing	−5.5	

2005 notional result
Party	Vote	%
Labour	15,897	38.7
Conservative	15,564	37.9
Liberal Democrats	8,080	19.7
Others	1,563	3.8
Turnout	41,104	59.7
Electorate	68,872	

=== Elections in the 2010s ===
General election 2010: Portsmouth North
Party	Candidate	Votes	%	±%
Conservative	Penny Mordaunt	19,533	44.3	+6.4
Labour Co-op	Sarah McCarthy-Fry	12,244	27.8	−10.9
Liberal Democrats	Darren Sanders	8,874	20.1	+0.5
UKIP	Mike Fitzgerald	1,812	4.1	+0.3
English Democrat	David Knight	1,040	2.4	N/A
Green	Iain Maclennan	461	1.0	N/A
TUSC	Mick Tosh	154	0.3	N/A
Majority		7,289	16.5	N/A
Turnout		44,118	62.7	+3.0
Registered electors		70,329		
Conservative gain from Labour		Swing	+8.7	

General election 2015: Portsmouth North
Party	Candidate	Votes	%	±%
Conservative	Penny Mordaunt	21,343	47.1	+2.8
Labour	John Ferrett	10,806	23.8	−3.9
UKIP	Mike Fitzgerald	8,660	19.1	+15.0
Liberal Democrats	Darren Sanders	2,828	6.2	−13.9
Green	Gavin Ellis	1,450	3.2	+2.2
TUSC	Jon Woods	231	0.5	+0.2
Majority		10,537	23.2	+6.7
Turnout		45,318	62.1	−0.7
Registered electors		73,105		
Conservative hold		Swing	+3.4	

General election 2017: Portsmouth North
Party	Candidate	Votes	%	±%
Conservative	Penny Mordaunt	25,860	54.8	+7.7
Labour	Rumal Khan	15,895	33.7	+9.8
Liberal Democrats	Darren Sanders	2,608	5.5	−0.7
UKIP	Mike Fitzgerald	1,926	4.1	−15.0
Green	Ken Hawkins	791	1.7	−1.5
Libertarian	Joe Jenkins	130	0.3	N/A
Majority		9,965	21.1	−2.1
Turnout		47,210	66.1	+4.2
Registered electors		71,374		
Conservative hold		Swing	–1.1	

General election 2019: Portsmouth North
Party	Candidate	Votes	%	±%
Conservative	Penny Mordaunt	28,172	61.4	+6.6
Labour	Amanda Martin	12,392	27.0	−6.7
Liberal Democrats	Antonia Harrison	3,419	7.4	+1.9
Green	Lloyd Day	1,304	2.8	+1.2
Independent	George Madgwick	623	1.4	N/A
Majority		15,780	34.4	+13.3
Turnout		45,910	64.4	−1.8
Registered electors		71,299		
Conservative hold		Swing	+6.6	

=== Elections in the 2020s ===
General election 2024: Portsmouth North
Party	Candidate	Votes	%	±%
Labour	Amanda Martin	14,495	34.8	+7.9
Conservative	Penny Mordaunt	13,715	33.0	–28.4
Reform	Melvyn Todd	8,501	20.4	N/A
Liberal Democrats	Simon Dodd	3,031	7.3	–0.2
Green	Duncan Robinson	1,851	4.5	+1.6
Majority		780	1.9	N/A
Turnout		41,593	59.0	–5.3
Registered electors		70,446		
Labour gain from Conservative		Swing	+18.1	

== See also ==
- Parliamentary constituencies in Hampshire
- Parliamentary constituencies in South East England

== Sources ==
- Craig, F. W. S. (1983) [1969]. British parliamentary election results 1918–1949 (3rd ed.). Chichester: Parliamentary Research Services. ISBN 0-900178-06-X.
