= Lord Bruce (disambiguation) =

Stanley Bruce (1883–1967) was the Prime Minister of Australia from 1923 to 1929.

Lord Bruce may also refer to:

- Earl of Elgin, a title in the Peerage of Scotland
- Marquess of Ailesbury, a title in the Peerage of the United Kingdom
- Earl of Kincardine, a title in the Peerage of Scotland
- Donald Bruce, Baron Bruce of Donington (1912–2005), British soldier, businessman and politician
- Malcolm Bruce, Baron Bruce of Bennachie (born 1944), British politician
