= Sarah McCarthy-Fry =

British Labour Co-op politician (born 1955)

Exchequer Secretary to the Treasury
- In office 18 June 2009 – 11 May 2010
- Prime Minister: Gordon Brown
- Preceded by: Kitty Ussher
- Succeeded by: David Gauke

Parliamentary Under-Secretary of State for Communities and Local Government
- In office 9 June 2009 – 18 June 2009
- Prime Minister: Gordon Brown
- Preceded by: Kitty Ussher
- Succeeded by: Barbara Follett

Parliamentary Under-Secretary of State of Schools
- In office 5 October 2008 – 8 June 2009
- Prime Minister: Gordon Brown
- Preceded by: The Lord Adonis
- Succeeded by: Diana Johnson

Member of Parliament for Portsmouth North
- In office 5 May 2005 – 12 April 2010
- Preceded by: Syd Rapson
- Succeeded by: Penny Mordaunt

Personal details
- Born: Sarah Louise Macaree; 4 February 1955 (age 71) Portsmouth, England
- Party: Labour Co-operative
- Spouse: Tony McCarthy

Sarah Louise McCarthy-Fry (née Macaree; born 4 February 1955) is a British Labour Co-operative politician. She was the Member of Parliament for Portsmouth North from the 2005 general election to 2010. She was Exchequer Secretary to the Treasury in the last phase of the Labour government of Gordon Brown.

== Early life ==
McCarthy-Fry is the daughter of a defence worker of Scottish descent. Fry is the surname of her first husband, McCarthy of her second. She was educated at Portsmouth High School. She worked for the multinational defence engineering company GKN Westland at Portsmouth, and later as financial controller for GKN Aerospace at Cowes, Isle of Wight.

== Political career ==
McCarthy-Fry attempted selection as the Labour candidate for the seat of Portsmouth North in 1997, and later became Syd Rapson's campaign manager. Her main political interests are trade and industry, defence and the social economy. She campaigned in favour of identity cards after a constituency survey indicated a large majority were in favour of them, and stressed her support for their introduction in her maiden speech after her election in 2005.

In 2006, McCarthy-Fry was made PPS to John Healey, the Financial Secretary to the Treasury. In Prime Minister Gordon Brown's cabinet reshuffle in 2007, she was made PPS to Geoff Hoon, the Chief Whip. On 5 October 2008, she was promoted to become a Parliamentary Under-Secretary of State in the Department for Children, Schools and Families replacing Lord Adonis, who was moved from Education to Transport. This was a controversial move that brought about much speculation in the press afterward; Adonis was seen to be a key education reformer and it was assumed that the government no longer had education as a priority. McCarthy-Fry was moved to the Department for Communities and Local Government in the June 2009 reshuffle.

However, on 17 June 2009 she was appointed Exchequer Secretary to the Treasury, replacing Kitty Ussher after the latter resigned. She was at the Department for Communities and Local Government for just one week.

At the general election on 6 May 2010, McCarthy-Fry lost her seat to the Conservative candidate Penny Mordaunt. Along with Anne Snelgrove, she co-ordinated Ed Balls's campaign in the Labour party leadership election which followed.

=== Expenses controversy ===
In May 2009 The Daily Telegraph revealed that McCarthy-Fry had attempted to claim on her expenses for a £100 set of hair straighteners, though the claim was refused. Items the taxpayer did fund included £333 worth of bedding and a sewing box.

== Later career ==
Soon after leaving parliament, McCarthy-Fry joined GKN Aerospace and was the company's Financial Controller for Cowes, Isle of Wight, from 2010 to 2012, and then its Finance Director for Cowes, Isle of Wight, and Western Approach, Bristol, from 2012 to 2020, when she retired at the age of 65.

== Personal life ==
McCarthy-Fry married her first husband, Roger Fry, in 1973, and her second, Tony McCarthy, in 1997; she has four grown-up children.

Parliament of the United Kingdom
| Preceded by Syd Rapson | Member of Parliament for Portsmouth North; 2005–2010 | Succeeded by Penny Mordaunt |
| Preceded by The Lord Adonis | Parliamentary Under-Secretary of State for Schools and Learners; 2008–2009 | Succeeded by Diana Johnson (Schools); Iain Wright (Learners) |
| Preceded by Unknown | Parliamentary Under-Secretary of State for Communities and Local Government; 2009 | Succeeded by |
