= Music Man Project =

UK charity for people with learning disabilities

The Music Man Project
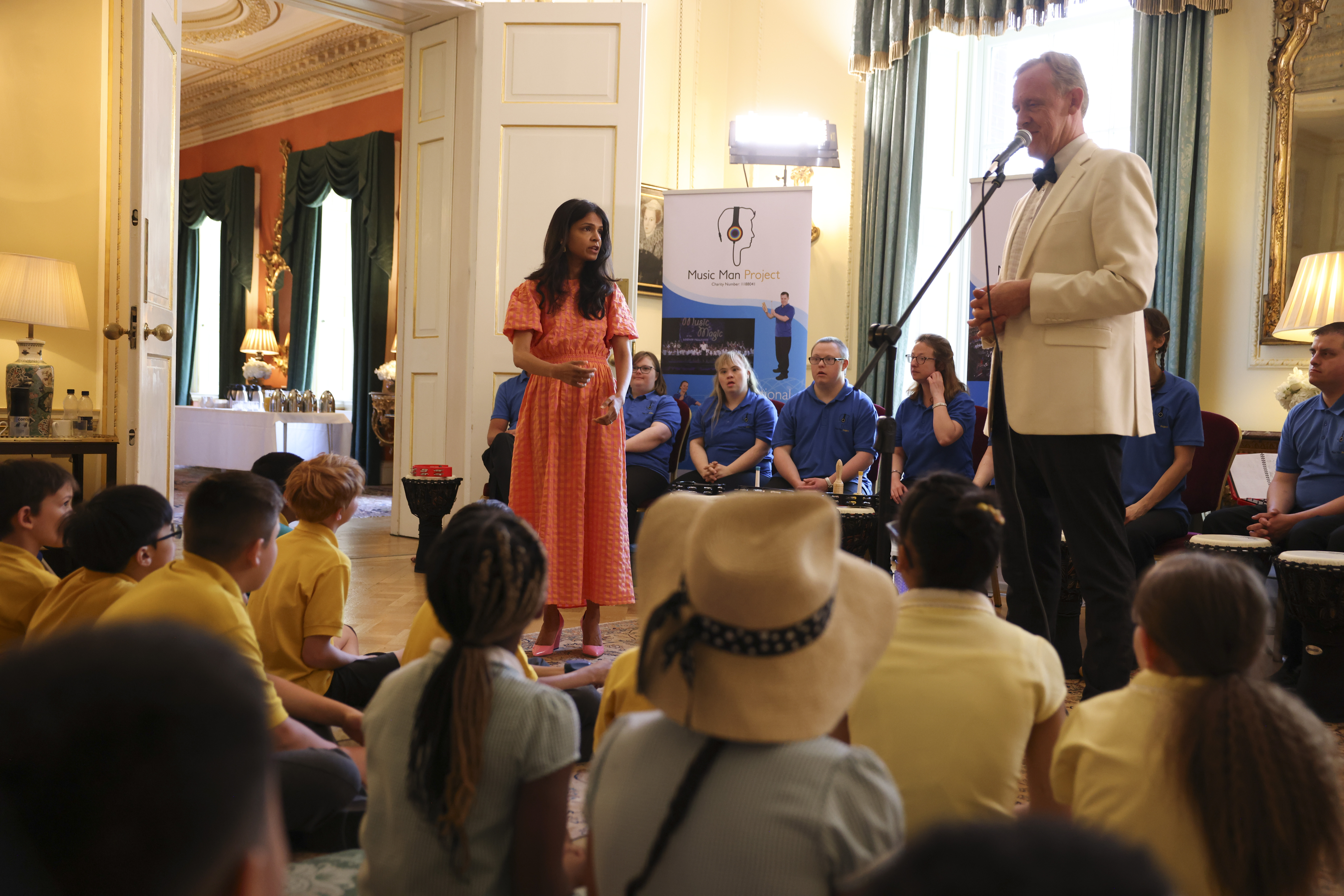
- The Music Man Project performs at 10 Downing Street in June 2023
- Founded: 2000
- Founder: David Stanley
- Registration no.: Charity number 1188041
- Location: Southend-on-Sea, United Kingdom
- Coordinates: 51.55°N 0.71°E
- Region served: United Kingdom and Overseas
- Key people: David Amess (late President); Michael Ball (Patron); Anna Firth (Patron); Penny Mordaunt (Patron)
- Website: Official Website

The Music Man Project (MMP) is a UK charity founded in Southend-on-Sea, Essex in 2000. It provides a music education and performance service for people with learning disabilities.

== History ==
The MMP began as Southend Mencap Music School in 2000, providing weekly music sessions for adults and children with learning disabilities. It was founded by former deputy head teacher David Stanley who was featured in season 3 of That'll Teach 'Em.

In 2012, the MMP was established as a full-time music education and performance service for adults in Southend. It also set up a service for local special schools. Since 2016, services have been set up in the UK and Overseas.

The MMP became a company limited by guarantee in 2019 and a separate charity in 2020.

The MMP was awarded the King's Award for Voluntary Service on 14 November 2024.

== Activities ==
The MMP supports its students to sing, play musical instruments and use actions based on Makaton sign language.

Its main activities in Southend include performances at civic engagements, public events and Christmas concerts.

It supports special schools by providing music tuition for pupils and performs with mainstream primary schoolchildren.

Performances have taken place at the London Palladium, Royal Albert Hall, 10 Downing Street and USS Midway Museum.

== Associations ==
David Amess was president of the MMP. He attended its concerts at the London Palladium in 2015 and the Royal Albert Hall in 2019. Following his murder in October 2021 the MMP sang at the funeral mass held in Westminster Cathedral and at a memorial concert at the Cliffs Pavilion in February 2022.

The Royal Marines Band Service began a collaboration with the MMP in 2022. They recorded a Christmas single in tribute to David Amess which was released in December 2022. In March 2023 the MMP performed with the Massed Bands of His Majesty's Royal Marines at the 51st Mountbatten Festival of Music. The event was attended by His Majesty King Charles III.

The Team Lewis Foundation charity formed a collaboration with the MMP in October 2021, providing a cash donation and support with media projects. In 2022 it created a new MMP website and provided training for ongoing maintenance. It issued a press release covering the launch of a music video for the Christmas single.

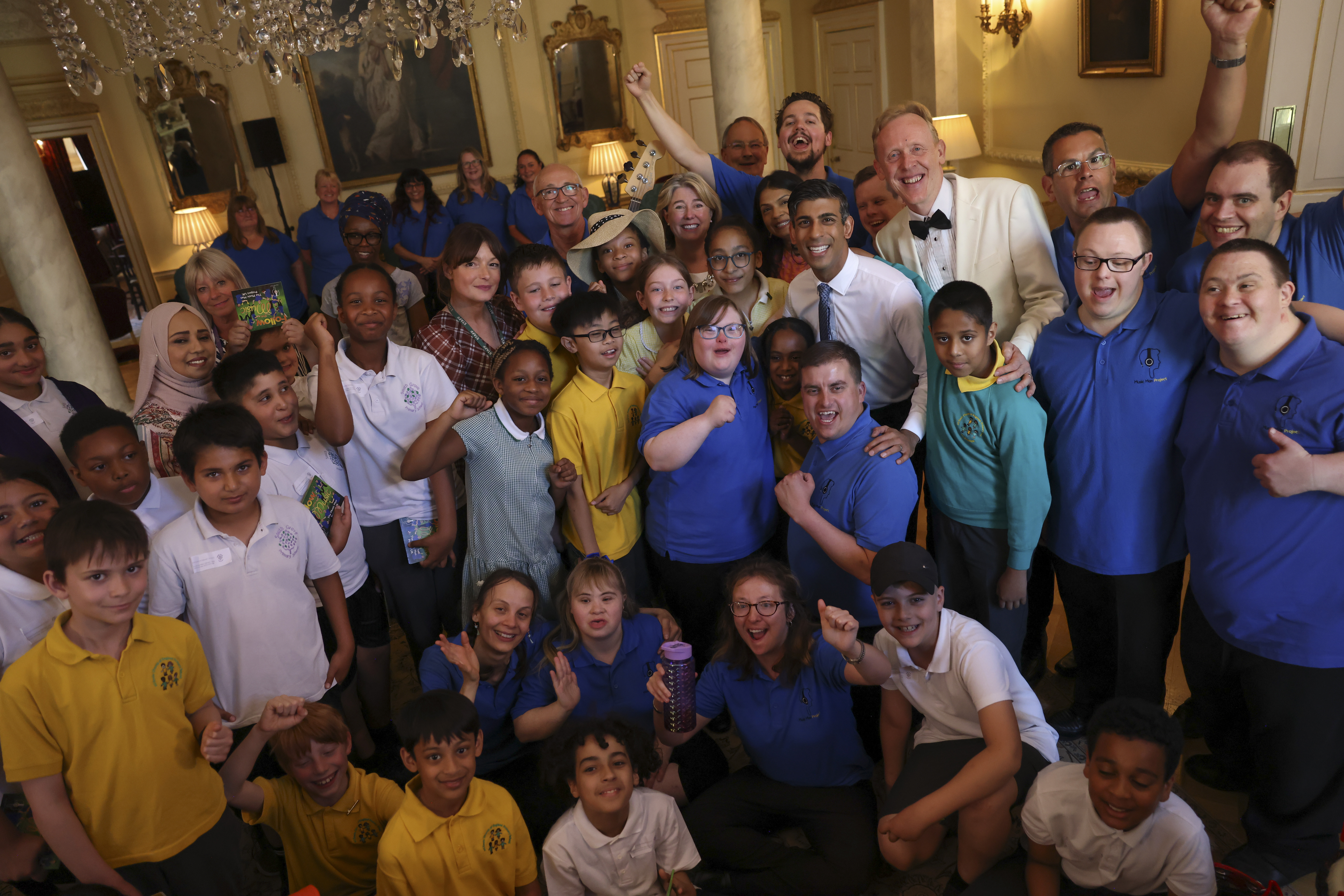
Rishi Sunak and Akshata Murty attend a performance by Music Man Project at 10 Downing Street in June 2023

Rishi Sunak supported the Christmas single. In June 2023 Sunak and Akshata Murty attended a performance by the MMP in 10 Downing Street.

Michael Ball met the MMP on The National Lottery (United Kingdom)'s Big Night of Musicals in March 2023 and became its patron in April 2023. Ball performed with the MMP in its concert at the Royal Albert Hall in April 2024.

The National Lottery provided grants to the MMP from the National Lottery Community Fund in 2012 and 2018. Three MMP students took part in its 25th anniversary advertisement in 2019. During the COVID-19 pandemic, it gave the MMP £10,000 from its coronavirus emergency fund. This was used by the MMP to supply instruments to people with learning disabilities and provide online music sessions.

In 2025 the MMP joined with Allegro Moderato, an Italian organisation for musicians with disabilities, to form The International Alliance of Accessible Music. This alliance aims to challenge perceptions of disability via music education and performance in conjunction with several international groups.

== UK ==
The MMP has replicated its Southend service by working with national organisations such as The Salvation Army and Mencap, and providing introductory sessions for others.

UK Services

- Essex – Southend on Sea (2012)
- Suffolk (2016)
- Kent/Medway (2017) which became a Community Interest Company in 2020
- Scotland (2018)
- Bristol/Bath (2018)
- Hampshire (2018)
- Hertfordshire (2019)
- Lincolnshire (2019)
- Lancashire (2023)
- West Sussex (2023)
- Somerset (2023)
- Essex – Brentwood, Essex (2024)
- London – Balham (2024)
- Nottingham (2024)
- Portsmouth (2024)
- Wakefield (2025)
- East London
- Cambridgeshire (2025)
- Plymouth (2025)
- Southampton (2025)
- Hackney (2026)

== Overseas ==
act of services have been introduced to learning disabled communities overseas.

- South Africa (Sizanani Children's Home) 2016
- India (Bangalore) 2018
- Nepal (Navjyoti Special School in Kathmandu) 2019
- United States (New York) 2019
- Philippines (Iloilo) 2020
- Jordan (Amman), run in conjunction with the Bunayat Centre for Special Education 2025.

In January 2023 the MMP visited San Diego United States to undertake performances and workshops with the Royal Marines Band Service.

In June 2024 the MMP visited Nova Scotia Canada to take part in the Royal Nova Scotia International Tattoo.

In September 2024 the MMP visited Milan Italy to play a concert in conjunction with Allegro Moderato.

In May 2025 the MMP joined with Italian group Scooppiati Diversamente to release a version of one of David Stanley's songs. In December 2025 they travelled to Italy to perform a concert in Rome with the group.
