= Bertram Falle, 1st Baron Portsea =

British politician

Bertram Godfray Falle, 1st Baron Portsea (21 November 1859 – 1 November 1948), known as Sir Bertram Falle, Bt, between 1916 and 1930, was a Jersey-born barrister and politician in the United Kingdom.

== Background and education ==
Falle was born on Jersey in the Channel Islands, the son of Joshua George Falle (1820–1903), Constable of Saint Helier and later Jurat of the Royal Court of Jersey, and Mary Elizabeth (née Godfray; died 1917). He was educated at Victoria College, Jersey, and graduated in 1883 from Pembroke College, Cambridge, with a Bachelor of Arts (B.A.) degree, followed by a Bachelor of Laws (LL.B.) two years later, having already been called to the bar, Inner Temple, several years before. In 1901 he graduated from the University of Paris with a Bachelor en droit degree.

== Legal and political career ==
Falle was a judge of the Native Court in Egypt from 1901 to 1903. Standing as a Liberal Unionist, he was elected as one of the two members of parliament for the Portsmouth constituency in Hampshire at the January 1910 general election. He joined the Conservative Party when the two parties formally merged in 1912, although the Liberal Unionists had long been indistinguishable from the Conservatives. During the First World War he served in the Royal Field Artillery, gaining the rank of Major. When the Portsmouth constituency was abolished for the 1918 general election, he was returned as a Coalition Conservative for the new single-seat Portsmouth North constituency. Re-elected as a Conservative in 1922, he held the seat until his elevation to the peerage in 1934. Falle was made a baronet of Plaisance in the Island of Jersey, on 7 July 1916. In 1934 he was raised to the peerage as Baron Portsea, of Portsmouth in the County of Southampton. The title was apparently purchased for £50,000 by his wife.

== Personal life ==
Falle married Mary, daughter of Russell Sturgis and widow of Lt.-Col. Leopold Richard Seymour, in 1906. Russell Sturgis had made his fortune in the opium trade before joining Barings Bank and later becoming head of the bank. There were no children from the marriage. Mary died in February 1942. Lord Portsea survived her by six years and died in November 1948, aged 88. The baronetcy and barony became extinct on his death. In accordance with his wishes, his sister Albina (who died in 1957) made a bequest to the States of Jersey which became the "Lord Portsea Gift Fund". The fund assists people from the Channel Islands who are unable to obtain sufficient financial support for additional training, re-training or specialised equipment to benefit their careers in the employment of the States of Jersey or of Guernsey, or of the United Kingdom.

Parliament of the United Kingdom
Preceded by Thomas Bramsdon and John Baker	Member of Parliament for Portsmouth; Jan. 1910 – 1918; With: Lord Charles Beresford, 1910–1916; Sir Hedworth Meux, Bt, 1916–1918	Constituency abolished
New constituency	Member of Parliament for Portsmouth North; 1918 – 1934	Succeeded by Roger Keyes
Baronetage of the United Kingdom
New creation	Baronet (of Plaisance); 1917–1948	Extinct
Peerage of the United Kingdom
New creation	Baron Portsea; 1934–1948	Extinct
