= Joshua George Falle (Jersey) =

Deputy
- In office 1863–1864 Serving with Adolphus John D’Allaine and Jean Le Cronier
- Constituency: St Helier

Connétable
- In office 1864–1873
- Preceded by: Clement Hemery (the younger)
- Succeeded by: Clement Hemery (the younger)
- Constituency: St Helier

Jurat for the Royal Court of Jersey
- In office 1874–1903
- Preceded by: Philip Le Bailly
- Succeeded by: Philippe Du Heaume
- Constituency: Jersey

Personal details
- Born: 27 November 1820 Jersey, Channel Islands
- Died: 15 February 1903 (aged 82) Jersey, Channel Islands
- Spouse: Mary Elizabeth Godfray
- Relations: Elise Esther Falle; Amelia Falle; Amelia Jeane Falle
- Children: Bertram Godfrey Falle, 1st Baron Portsea; Albina Falle; Rozel Falle

Joshua George Falle (27 November 1820 – 15 February 1903) was a prominent Jersey politician who first served as a Deputy and Connétable for St Helier in the States Assembly. He went on to be appointed as the Jurat for the Royal Court of Jersey in 1874, which was a role he held until his death in 1903.

== Personal life ==
Joshua George Falle was born in St Saviour, Jersey on 27 November 1820. He was the son of Joshua Falle and Esther Bertram. On 16 June 1855, he married 23-year-old Mary Elizabeth Godfray at St Saviours Church in Jersey. They went on to have three children; Bertram Godfrey Falle, 1st Baron of Portsea and MP for Portsmouth (1859–1948), Rozel Falle (born 1857) and Albina Falle (1859–1957), who was instrumental in setting up the families long term legacy in Jersey by leaving a massive bequest to the States of Jersey - the Lord Portsea Gift Fund, which was an educational and career-advancement trust that still benefits islanders today.

While Falle was a wealthy land and property owner, an official home department petition revealed that a formal complaint, made by an islander called John Winter Nicolle, revealed that Falle had "Fallen into Debt" during his tenure as Jurat of the Royal Court of Jersey (1874–1903).

Falle's primary residence was at the Plaisance Estate, which was located at the border between St Saviour and St Clement in Jersey.

== Political career ==
Falle was first elected to the States Assembly in 1863, where he served in the recently created role of Deputy for St Helier. In 1864, he was elected as the Connétable for St Helier, where he oversaw a period of growth and civic transition on the Islands capital. He held this role until 1873.

In 1874, Falle was appointed as the Jurat for the Royal Court of Jersey. Throughout his tenure, the British Government frequently tried to pass imperial acts onto Jersey without consulting Jersey's Parliament. They did this in an attempt to ‘modernise’ the Islands system, and bring it under British rule as they viewed the island's system as outdated and corrupt. He subsequently came under significant pressure from the British Home Office in London to assimilate Jersey's legal systems and Norman-French customs into mainstream British law. However, Falle was a vocal traditionalist for Jersey. Falle fiercely opposed London's imperial attitudes and fought to protect Jersey's self governing privileges. He spend decades in the States Chamber arguing that Jersey's assembly was an independent legislation, not a subordinate provincial council. His resistance laid the early groundwork for the formal domestic autonomy that Jersey hold today.

He became a symbol of defence for the Island's freedoms. When he died in 1903, he was commemorated with a white marble bust. On it, it read: "Il fut toujours le defenseur des institutions et des libertes de cette ile" (English: "He was always the defender of the institutions and liberties of this Island").
