= Penny Mordaunt =

British politician (born 1973)

The Right Honourable Dame Penny Mordaunt
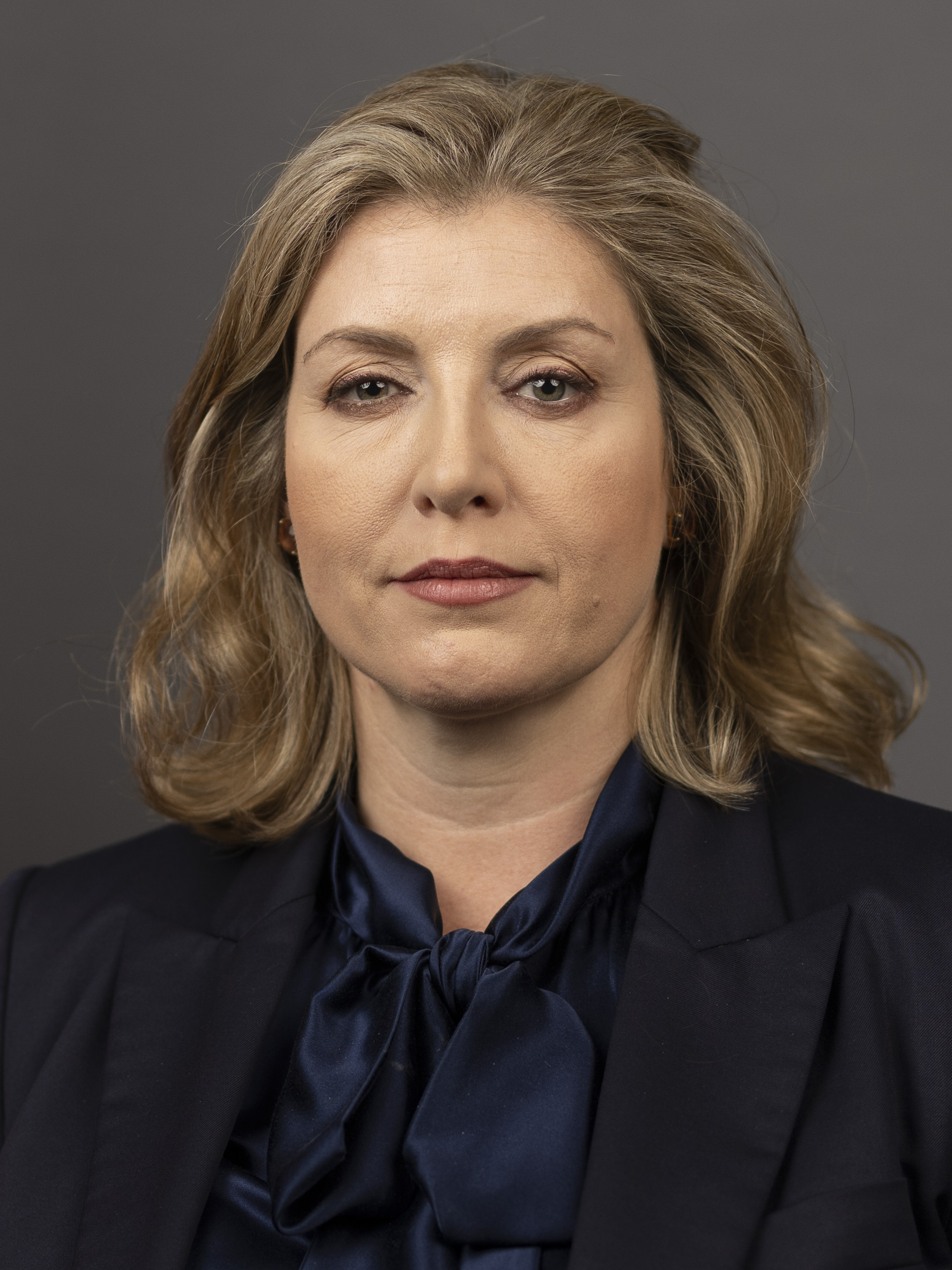
- Official portrait, 2022

Leader of the House of Commons Lord President of the Council
- In office 6 September 2022 – 5 July 2024
- Prime Minister: Liz Truss; Rishi Sunak
- Preceded by: Mark Spencer
- Succeeded by: Lucy Powell

Secretary of State for Defence
- In office 1 May 2019 – 24 July 2019
- Prime Minister: Theresa May
- Preceded by: Gavin Williamson
- Succeeded by: Ben Wallace

Secretary of State for International Development
- In office 9 November 2017 – 1 May 2019
- Prime Minister: Theresa May
- Preceded by: Priti Patel
- Succeeded by: Rory Stewart

Minister for Women and Equalities
- In office 30 April 2018 – 24 July 2019
- Prime Minister: Theresa May
- Preceded by: Amber Rudd
- Succeeded by: Amber Rudd
Junior ministerial offices
Minister of State for Trade Policy
In office 16 September 2021 – 6 September 2022
Prime Minister	Boris Johnson
Preceded by	Greg Hands
Succeeded by	Conor Burns
Paymaster General
In office 13 February 2020 – 16 September 2021
Prime Minister	Boris Johnson
Preceded by	Oliver Dowden
Succeeded by	Michael Ellis
Minister of State for Disabled People, Work and Health
In office 15 July 2016 – 9 November 2017
Prime Minister	Theresa May
Preceded by	Justin Tomlinson
Succeeded by	Sarah Newton
Minister of State for the Armed Forces
In office 11 May 2015 – 15 July 2016
Prime Minister	David Cameron
Preceded by	Mark François
Succeeded by	Mike Penning
Parliamentary Under-Secretary of State for Decentralisation
In office 14 July 2014 – 11 May 2015
Prime Minister	David Cameron
Preceded by	Nick Boles
Succeeded by	James Wharton

Member of Parliament for Portsmouth North
- In office 6 May 2010 – 30 May 2024
- Preceded by: Sarah McCarthy-Fry
- Succeeded by: Amanda Martin

Personal details
- Born: Penelope Mary Mordaunt; 4 March 1973 (age 53) Torquay, Devon, England
- Party: Conservative
- Spouse: Paul Murray (m. 1999; div. 2000)
- Education: University of Reading (BA)

Military service
- Allegiance: United Kingdom
- Branch/service: Royal Navy
- Years of service: 2010–2019
- Rank: Acting Sub-Lieutenant (Honorary Captain)
- Unit: Royal Naval Reserve
- Penny Mordaunt's voice Mordaunt comments on her appointment as Secretary of State for International Development; Recorded 10 November 2017

Dame Penelope Mary Mordaunt (/ˈmɔːrdənt/; born 4 March 1973) is a British politician who served as Lord President of the Council and Leader of the House of Commons from 2022 until 2024. She was the Member of Parliament (MP) for Portsmouth North from 2010 to 2024. A member of the Conservative Party, she stood for the party leadership in 2022, losing to Liz Truss. In the 2024 general election, Mordaunt lost her Portsmouth North seat to Labour's Amanda Martin.

Mordaunt pursued a degree in Philosophy at the University of Reading, before working in the public relations industry. She held roles under Conservative Party leaders John Major and William Hague, and also worked for George W. Bush's presidential campaigns in 2000 and 2004. Mordaunt was elected to the House of Commons at the 2010 general election. Under the coalition government of David Cameron, she served as Parliamentary Under-Secretary of State for Decentralisation from 2014 to 2015. After the 2015 general election, Cameron promoted her to Minister of State for the Armed Forces, the first woman to hold the post. Mordaunt supported Brexit in the 2016 referendum on EU membership. Following Theresa May's appointment as prime minister, Mordaunt was appointed Minister of State for Disabled People, Work and Health. In 2017, following the resignation of Priti Patel, she was appointed Secretary of State for International Development. She also served as Minister for Women and Equalities from 2018 to 2019.

In May 2019, Mordaunt was appointed to the Cabinet position of Secretary of State for Defence, replacing Gavin Williamson, becoming the first woman to hold the post. She served as Defence Secretary for 85 days before returning to the backbenches, having been removed from office by the new prime minister Boris Johnson. In the February 2020 reshuffle, she re-entered government as Paymaster General. In the 2021 reshuffle, she was appointed Minister of State for Trade Policy.

Following Johnson's announcement in July 2022 that he would resign as Leader of the Conservative Party and prime minister, Mordaunt entered the leadership contest to succeed him, but was eliminated in the final round of voting among Conservative MPs and subsequently endorsed Truss. Mordaunt was appointed as Leader of the House of Commons and Lord President of the Council when Truss became prime minister. Following Truss's resignation on 20 October 2022, Mordaunt made a second bid to become Conservative leader and prime minister. She pulled out of the election after being unable to gain the necessary endorsement of 100 MPs, allowing Sunak to become Conservative Leader and prime minister unopposed. Sunak later retained Mordaunt in his cabinet, continuing as Leader of the House of Commons and Lord President, giving her a notable role at the coronation of Charles III and Camilla. In the 2024 general election, Mordaunt was one of many high-profile Conservative members of parliament who lost their seats in Labour's landslide victory, alongside Liz Truss, Grant Shapps, Jacob Rees-Mogg and Johnny Mercer.

== Early life and education ==
Penelope Mordaunt was born on 4 March 1973 in Torquay, Devon. The daughter of a former paratrooper, she says that she was named after Navy cruiser HMS Penelope. Her father, John Mordaunt, born at Hilsea Barracks, served in the Parachute Regiment before retraining as a teacher, and later became a youth worker for Hampshire County Council. Her mother, Jennifer (née Snowden), was a special education teacher at schools in Purbrook. Through her mother she is a relative of Philip Snowden, the first Labour Chancellor of the Exchequer. The actress Angela Lansbury was her grandmother's cousin, thus she is distantly related to former Labour Party leader George Lansbury, as well as Malcolm Bligh Turnbull AC, who served as the 29th prime minister of Australia from 2015 to 2018.

Mordaunt has two brothers: her twin, James, and a younger brother, Edward. She was educated at Oaklands Roman Catholic School in Waterlooville, Hampshire, and studied drama at the Victoryland Theatre School. Mordaunt was 15 when her mother died of breast cancer and after leaving school, she became her younger brother Edward's primary caregiver. The following year her father was also diagnosed with cancer, from which he recovered. To support her time at university Mordaunt worked in a Johnson & Johnson factory, and became a magician's assistant to Will Ayling, a past president of the Portsmouth and District Magic Circle and of the British Ring of the International Brotherhood of Magicians.

Mordaunt has attributed her interest in politics to her experiences whilst working in hospitals and orphanages of Romania in the aftermath of the 1989 revolution. Mordaunt read philosophy at the University of Reading, graduating in 1995 with upper second class honours. Although her parents had both undertaken further education, Mordaunt was the first member of her family to attend university. Mordaunt was active in student politics and served as president of the Reading University Students' Union.

== Early professional career ==
After graduation, Mordaunt worked in public relations in various sectors. Under Prime Minister John Major she was Head of Youth for the Conservative Party, before working for two years as Head of Broadcasting for the Conservatives under party leader William Hague (1999–2001). She worked as a communications specialist for the Freight Transport Association (now Logistics UK) from 1997 to 1999. In 2000, she worked briefly as Head of Foreign Press for George W. Bush's presidential campaign.

She was Communications Director for the Royal Borough of Kensington and Chelsea from 2001 to 2003, before leaving to set up a new Anglo-American website called 'virtualconservatives'. Lord Moylan, who was Deputy Leader of Kensington and Chelsea Council where Mordaunt was hired as a Director of Communications, said: "We had to get rid of her after a few months because she was incompetent."

From 2004 to 2006, she was a director of Media Intelligence Partners. Mordaunt worked again for the Bush campaign in 2004. She was a director at the Community Fund, which merged with the New Opportunities Fund to create the Big Lottery Fund, and created the Veterans Reunited programme, enabling service men and women to visit World War II battlefields and be involved in commemorative events. Mordaunt worked for the Big Lottery Fund from 2003 to 2005. In 2006, she became one of six directors at charity Diabetes UK, a role she held until 2009.

== Entry into parliament ==
In November 2003, Mordaunt was selected as the Conservative candidate to contest Portsmouth North in the 2005 general election. She attained a 5.5% swing towards the Conservatives, but lost to Labour candidate Sarah McCarthy-Fry by 1,139 votes. A critic of women-only shortlists, Mordaunt worked after the 2005 election as chief of staff for David Willetts's aborted leadership campaign. Mordaunt was re-selected in January 2006 to contest Portsmouth North at the 2010 general election. At the election, she won the seat with an 8.6% swing from Labour, giving her a 7,289 majority. After her election in 2010, she became a member of the Public Bill Committee for the Defence Reform Act 2014. In Parliament, she has also previously sat on the Privacy and Injunctions (Joint Committee), the Defence Committee, the European Scrutiny Committee and the Committees on Arms Export Controls (formerly Quadripartite Committee).

In 2014, Mordaunt proposed the Loyal Address in reply to the Queen's Speech from the throne. When receiving the Speech of the Year award at The Spectator magazine's Parliamentarian of the Year Awards in November 2014, Mordaunt said that she had delivered a speech in the House of Commons just before the Easter recess in 2013 on poultry welfare so as to use the word "cock", as a forfeit for a misdemeanour during Naval Reserve training. She used the word "cock" six times and "lay" or "laid" five times. Following her comments, she was accused by Labour MP Kate Hoey of trivialising parliament. At the 2015 general election, Mordaunt was re-elected as the MP for Portsmouth North with an increased majority of 10,537. She was re-elected at the 2017 general election with a decreased majority of 9,965, but at the 2019 general election she increased her majority to 15,780, where she won 61.4% of the vote. In February 2024, Mordaunt was re-selected as the Conservative candidate for Portsmouth North at the 2024 general election.

== Ministerial career ==
Mordaunt was appointed Parliamentary Under-Secretary of State for Decentralisation at the Department for Communities and Local Government by Prime Minister David Cameron in the 2014 cabinet reshuffle. During her tenure, she was accused by the Fire Brigades Union "of misleading MPs over assurances given to firefighters from fire authorities regarding what would happen to their pensions if they fail fitness tests". This dispute led to strike action by firefighters over the increase of retirement age.

Mordaunt was appointed Minister of State for the Armed Forces in May 2015, becoming the first woman to hold the post. Major Robert Campbell, who was investigated and exonerated over the death of an Iraqi in 2003, criticised Mordaunt for backing the Iraq Historic Allegations Team while she was Armed Forces Minister, stating: "Now she is depicting herself as the armed forces champion but she never did anything for me. She needs to apologise for how we were treated. She failed us as the armed forces champion." In July 2016, following Theresa May's appointment as prime minister, Mordaunt was appointed Minister of State for Disabled People, Work and Health at the Department for Work and Pensions.

=== Secretary of State for International Development: 2017–2019 ===
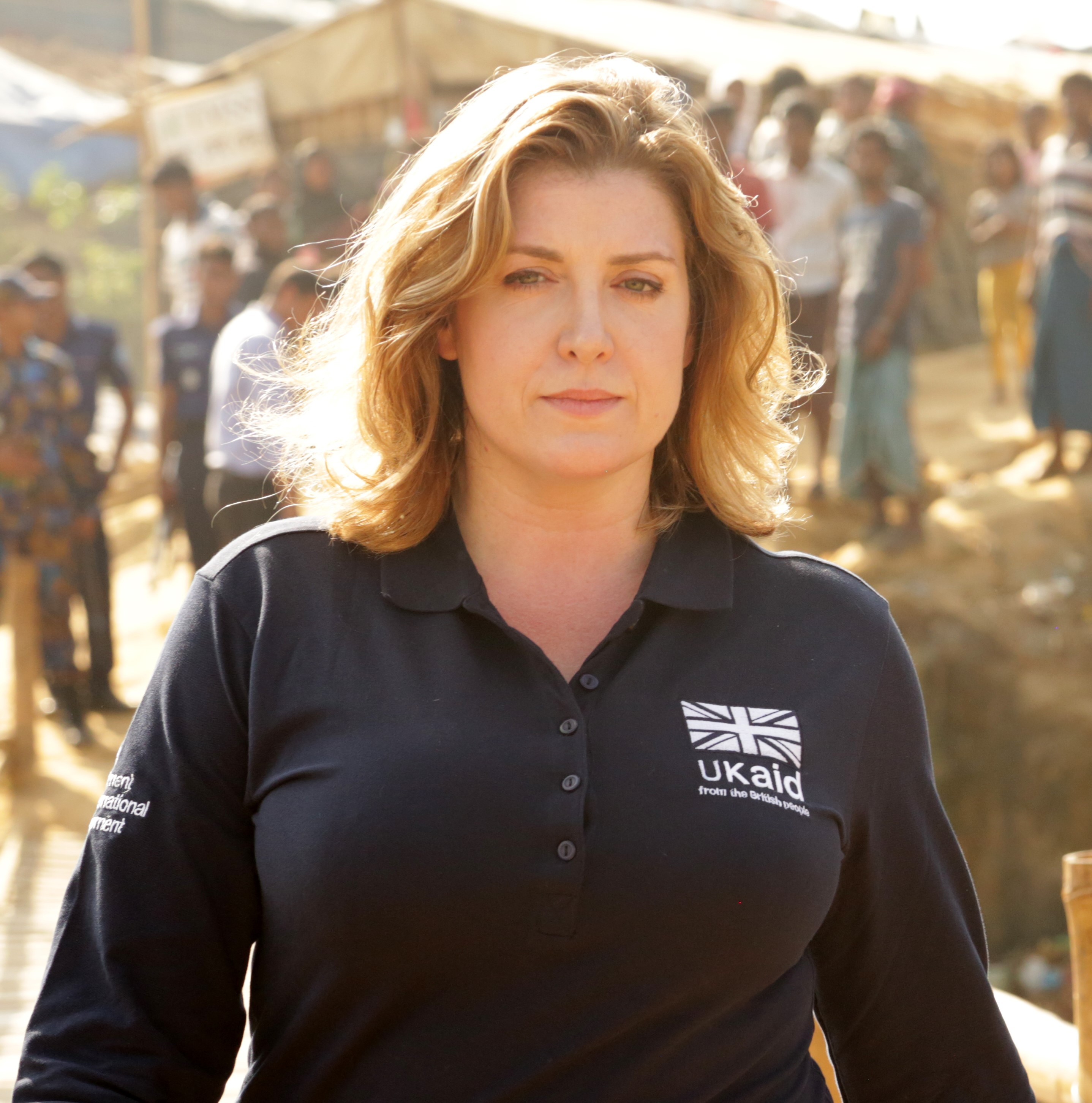
Mordaunt on a visit to Kutupalong in Bangladesh in November 2017

Mordaunt was promoted to the Cabinet as Secretary of State for International Development by Prime Minister Theresa May on 9 November 2017, after Priti Patel resigned. In February 2018, an investigation by The Times newspaper revealed allegations of misconduct by Oxfam staff operating in Haiti, in the aftermath of the 2010 earthquake. Mordaunt argued that Oxfam, which had received £32 million in Government funds in the previous financial year, had failed in its "moral leadership" over the scandal. She also said that Oxfam did "absolutely the wrong thing" by not reporting the detail of the allegations to the Government. Mordaunt felt it was important for aid organisations to report offences because she suspected that there were paedophiles "targeting" the charity sector in order to carry out predatory activities.

=== Minister for Women and Equalities: 2018–2019 ===
Mordaunt became Minister for Women and Equalities in April 2018, replacing Amber Rudd, who had resigned following the Windrush scandal. In July 2018 she became the first minister to use sign language in the House of Commons, to applause from all sides. In March 2019, she was criticised in a newspaper article by Maya Forstater, who claimed she had not answered to Mumsnet users' satisfaction questions on sex and gender during a webchat held on International Women's Day.

=== Secretary of State for Defence: 2019 ===
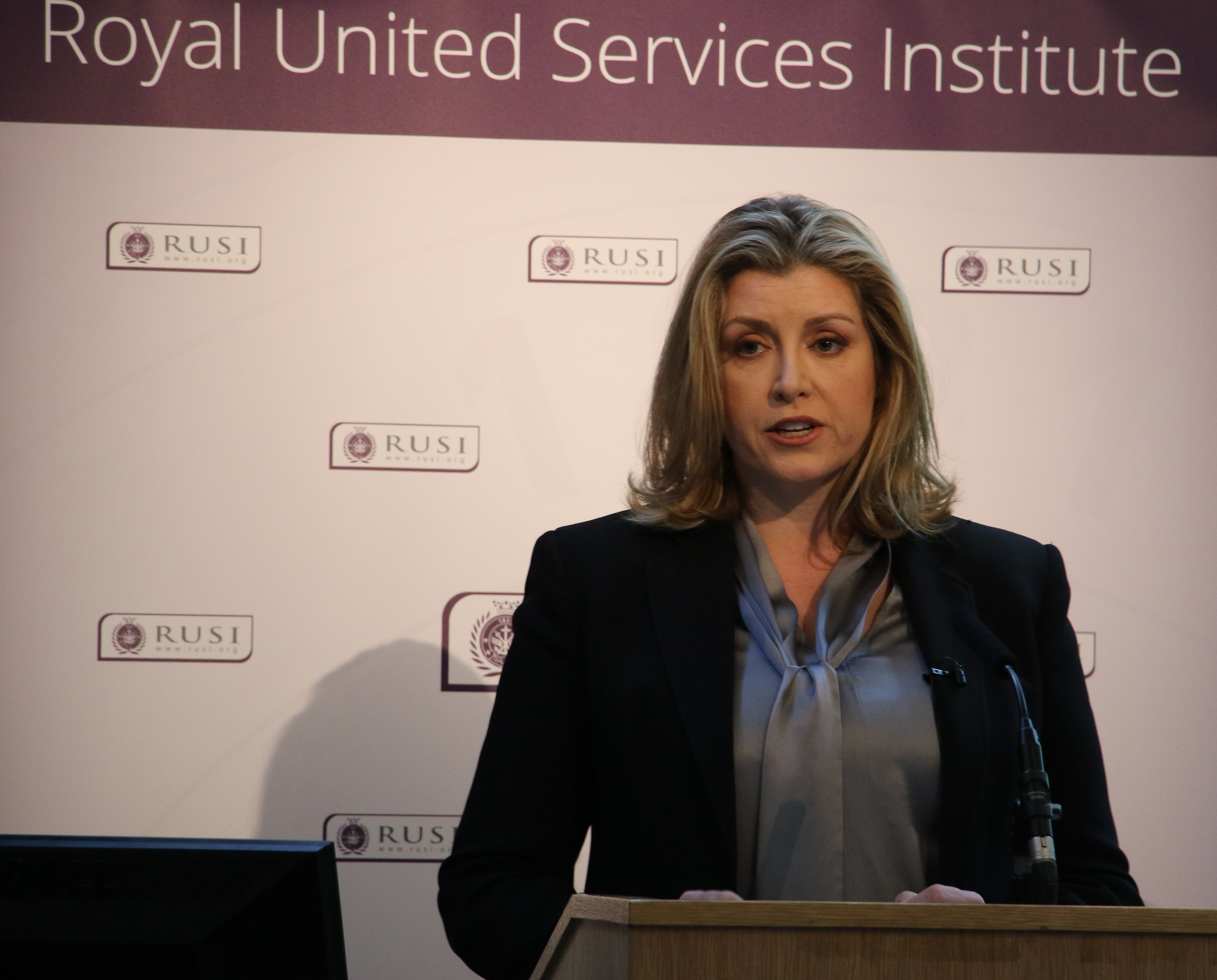
Mordaunt in 2019

On 1 May 2019, Mordaunt was appointed as the first female Secretary of State for Defence following the dismissal of Gavin Williamson. After Boris Johnson was elected Conservative Leader and appointed prime minister, he sacked Mordaunt as Defence Secretary, thus she left the Government on 24 July 2019. Mordaunt had been a prominent supporter of Johnson's opponent, Jeremy Hunt, in the 2019 Conservative Party leadership election.

=== Re-entry into Government ===
In a cabinet reshuffle in February 2020, Mordaunt re-entered the government, joining the Cabinet Office as Paymaster General in succession to Oliver Dowden. She was the UK alternate co-chair of the EU Withdrawal Agreement Joint Committee. She was appointed Minister of State for Trade Policy in the 2021 cabinet reshuffle. Lord Frost was critical of her time as his deputy in the Brexit negotiations, saying he had "grave reservations" about her being prime minister and that "she did not master the detail that was necessary when we were in negotiations".

=== Leader of the House of Commons: 2022–2024 ===
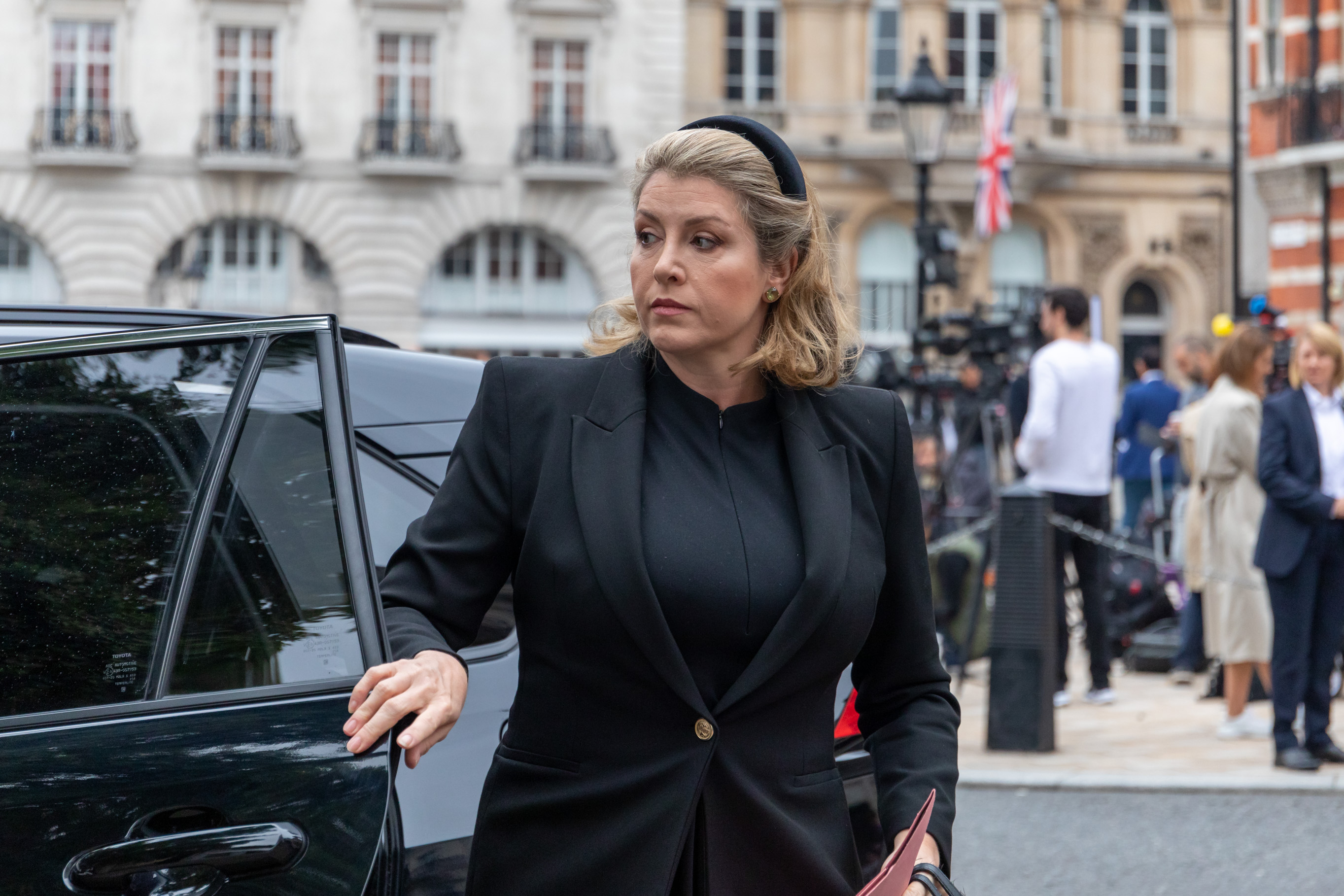
Mordaunt, as Lord President of the Council, arriving at the Accession Council of King Charles III

On 6 September 2022, Mordaunt was appointed Leader of the House of Commons and Lord President of the Council. Four days later, as Lord President of the Council, she presided over the Accession Council ceremony of King Charles III. During a debate in the House of Commons, Mordaunt deputised for Liz Truss to receive questions from Leader of the Labour Party Sir Keir Starmer. After Truss resigned and was succeeded by Rishi Sunak a month later, Mordaunt remained Leader of the House of Commons and Lord President of the Council.

On 6 May 2023, Mordaunt participated in the coronation of Charles III and Camilla, presenting the Jewelled Sword of Offering, in her ceremonial role as Lord President of the Privy Council and bearer of the Sword of State. She became the first woman ever to fulfil the role. Instead of the traditional court dress, Mordaunt commissioned her outfit, which included teal-shade cape dress and headpiece both embroidered with golden ferns. Mordaunt's outfit and overall performance in carrying the heavy Sword of State went viral online, receiving praise from both benches of the Parliament. Mordaunt attributed her strength to her previous navy training, while disclosing that she took painkillers before the ceremony.

On 6 October 2023, at the Conservative Party Conference in Manchester, Mordaunt delivered what many saw as a bizarre speech imploring those in attendance to "stand up and fight" 12 times during the speech, which then went viral on social media.

In May 2024, before the 2024 general election, Mordaunt's office produced a guide warning that conspiracy theories 'can pose a danger to democracy', which included the '15-minute cities' conspiracy theory that had been quoted by some Conservatives. During the election campaign, Mordaunt attended a BBC debate hosted by Mishal Husain which took place on 7 June, and also included Nigel Farage, Carla Denyer, Rhun ap Iorwerth, Daisy Cooper, Stephen Flynn and Angela Rayner. The debate included exchanges between Mordaunt and Rayner over Labour's tax plans, and all the attendees criticised Sunak leaving the D-Day events early; Mordaunt said Sunak's choice to leave prematurely had been "completely wrong." Another debate between these leaders took place on 13 June on ITV, with Julie Etchingham as moderator. The debate included further exchanges between Mordaunt and Rayner over Labour's tax plans.

In the 2024 general election, Mordaunt lost her Portsmouth North seat to Labour candidate Amanda Martin. Mordaunt was one of many high-profile Conservative politicians who lost their seats in Labour’s landslide victory, alongside Liz Truss, Grant Shapps, Jacob Rees-Mogg and Johnny Mercer.

== Conservative leadership bids ==
=== July–September 2022 ===
Mordaunt's 2022 leadership logo

In July 2022, following the resignation of Boris Johnson during the July 2022 government crisis, Mordaunt launched her bid to be the next Conservative Leader and consequently UK Prime Minister. An early promotional video published by her campaign attracted criticism for featuring footage of former professional sprinter Oscar Pistorius, who murdered his girlfriend Reeva Steenkamp in 2013. Athlete Jonnie Peacock requested to be removed from the same video published by her campaign. Mordaunt's campaign edited the video to remove footage of Peacock and Pistorius, and later issued a third edition of the video with a short clip of the murdered Labour MP Jo Cox removed, following a request from Cox's family.

In 2018, Mordaunt, the then Women and Equalities Minister, told MPs that "trans men are men, trans women are women" at the launch of a consultation on reforming the Gender Recognition Act. Several Conservative activists criticised Mordaunt "for her pro-trans stance" according to reports by the Daily Telegraph published on 8 July 2022 the day after Boris Johnson's resignation as Conservative party leader. On the following day, shortly before she launched her bid for the leadership of the Conservative party, Mordaunt responded to the question "Do I know what a woman is?" by writing on Twitter: "I am biologically a woman. If I have a hysterectomy or mastectomy, I am still a woman. And I am legally a woman. Some people born male and who have been through the gender recognition process are also legally female. That DOES NOT mean they are biological women, like me." The Spectator noted Mordaunt's earlier stance on trans issues, and was critical of what it called her "cowardice" in changing her publicly stated views, being "willing to toss them overboard at her earliest convenience" during her leadership campaign. The Times described her as a "socially liberal Brexiteer".

Mordaunt was one of eight contenders who achieved the necessary 20 nominations by 12 July deadline. Three other candidates had to drop out earlier that day. On 20 July, Mordaunt was eliminated from the fifth round of the leadership competition after failing to secure sufficient support from Conservative MPs. On 1 August 2022, Mordaunt declared her support for Liz Truss in the final round of the leadership contest.

=== October 2022 ===
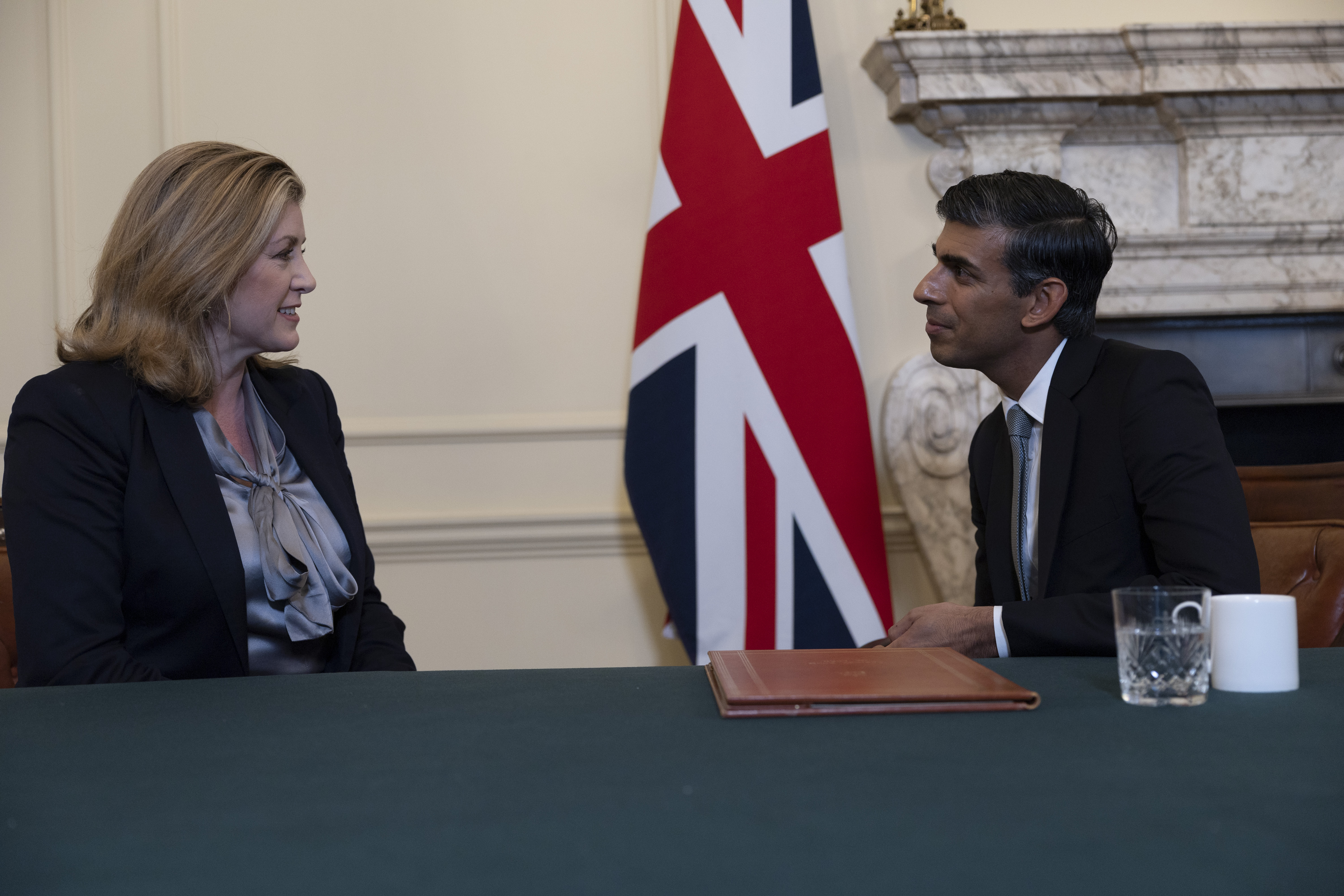
Mordaunt meeting with Rishi Sunak

Following the resignation of Truss during the October 2022 government crisis, Mordaunt declared she would seek nomination in the ensuing Conservative Party leadership election. However, after only 27 MPs publicly backed her nomination, she pulled out of the election, allowing Rishi Sunak to become Leader unopposed. She tweeted her withdrawal two minutes before the 2pm deadline on 24 October, by which candidates needed to have 100 nominations, and then issued a statement. Mordaunt was later re-appointed to her role by Sunak.

== Post-parliamentary career ==
In November 2024, Mordaunt was appointed as Chairwoman for the Coalition for Global Prosperity.

In February 2025, Mordaunt confirmed to PoliticsHome that she sought a return to the House of Commons. This was reiterated on ITV's Peston programme, where she said she was "filling out [her] application form to get on the candidates list", later hinting she would seek to return to the House of Commons before the next election should the right by-election opportunity arise. Mordaunt praised current Conservative leader Kemi Badenoch and Shadow Chancellor Mel Stride and said she was "sticking with [Badenoch]" to rebuild the party.

Mordaunt was present at the 2025 Conservative Party Conference, held from 5–8 October, with The Times reporting she was a "popular figure" at the conference where she sold out both of her books.

In April 2025, Mordaunt began a part-time paid role with British American Tobacco, as part of its transformation advisory board; she also started paid work with maritime technology company Sub Sea Craft.

In July 2025, she co-authored a report into antisemitism in the UK with Labour peer Lord Mann commissioned by the Board of Deputies of British Jews.

In September 2025, Mordaunt was appointed President of the Southend-based charity, The Music Man Project, which provides music education and performance opportunities to people with disabilities. She succeeded former Southend West MP David Amess.

Premiering 21 September 2026, Mordaunt starred in Sky One documentary/drama series, The Wargame. She portrayed the role of Defence Secretary in the scenario-based show.

== Military service ==

Mordaunt was a member of the Royal Naval Reserve from 2010 until 2019. From 2010 until 2015, she served as an acting sub-lieutenant (a subordinate officer without a commission), and was based at shore establishment HMS King Alfred on Whale Island, Portsmouth. In May 2015 she was placed onto Reserve 'List 6', a category for personnel unable to meet any training commitment in excess of a year; she had "no annual training commitment and received no remuneration" from the Royal Navy during this time. She remained on List 6 until April 2019, at which point she left the RNR. Mordaunt was granted the honorary rank of commander in April 2019, and then promoted to honorary captain RNR on 30 June 2021.

== Views and activities ==
=== Splash! appearance ===
In 2014, Mordaunt appeared on reality television programme Splash!. Although her Labour opponents criticised the media appearance, questioning whether her focus should instead have been on her constituency work, Mordaunt stated that the response was overwhelmingly positive and defended her appearance, stating that she was donating all of her £10,000 appearance fee plus any additional sponsorship to charity: £7,000 towards the renovation of her local lido and the rest to four armed services charities.

=== Brexit ===
In the 2016 United Kingdom European Union membership referendum, Mordaunt supported Brexit. During the referendum campaign, Mordaunt said the United Kingdom did not have a veto to Turkey joining the European Union. Given this is a provision of the Treaty on European Union, Mordaunt was accused of 'lying' over the matter. When challenged about her claim, Mordaunt said: "There is a provision for a veto but we could not have used it because David Cameron gave an undertaking that he would support their accession and having given that undertaking to a NATO country, he would not have been able to walk away." She reiterated her defence of her 2016 comments during her Conservative Party leadership campaign in July 2022.

On 7 October 2025, she declared her support for the UK withdrawing from the European Convention on of Human Rights, a U-turn from her previous opposition to withdrawal in 2022.

=== Northern Ireland ===
Mordaunt voted in favour of legalising same-sex marriage in Northern Ireland. She has said in the House of Commons that the Northern Ireland protocol creates unique disadvantages for Northern Ireland.

=== Homeopathy ===
Mordaunt has often advocated that the British National Health Service should fund the availability of homeopathy. In 2010, she signed a Parliamentary Early Day Motion that claimed there was "overwhelming anecdotal evidence that homeopathy is effective" and called for the government to "maintain a policy of allowing health commissions to refer to homeopathic doctors and approved homeopaths".

=== Muslim Council of Britain meeting ===
Since 2009, Labour, the Conservative-Liberal Democrat coalition and Conservative governments have maintained a policy of "non-engagement" with the Muslim Council of Britain due to allegations the group does not represent the British Muslim community and claims that members of the council had made "favourable" remarks about extremists in the past.

As Paymaster General, Mordaunt met with the Secretary General of the MCB, Zara Mohammed, which Alan Mendoza of the Henry Jackson Society described as "shocking". A government spokesperson told The Jewish Chronicle: "The UK government has a long-standing policy of not engaging with the MCB and that has not changed."

=== Royal yachts ===
In June 2020, Mordaunt produced a proposal for a pair of ships with the primary role of specialising in trade, research, and humanitarian work. The vessels were to be funded by private, research, commercial and charitable funds, in partnership with the UK's Overseas Development Assistance budget. The vessels could also be used as "cost effective and secure" accommodation for members of the royal family on visits, so would effectively be successor to the Royal Yacht Britannia which had been decommissioned in 1997. Mordaunt said of it: “We know that industry would also support as would a growing coalition of commercial and trade ventures, research organisations, shipbuilders and ship support companies, maritime training organisations and medical and health projects”. The director of the Global Britain Programme at the Henry Jackson Society said: "These new ships will help project Britain's image around the world".

=== Vandalism of war memorials ===
In June 2020, in response to vandalism of war memorials, Mordaunt stated: "I would like to suggest that for some found guilty of vandalising such memorials they might benefit from some time spent with our service personnel – perhaps at a battle camp. That might give them a new appreciation of just what these people go through for their sakes."

== Personal life ==
Mordaunt met Paul Murray as a student at the University of Reading and married him in 1999, but they divorced the following year. In 2016, she ended her relationship with businessman Ian Lyon, a part-time classical singer and Portsmouth City Council Councillor. In 2016, she owned four Burmese cats.

Mordaunt's hobbies include astronomy, painting, dance and music. Mordaunt has been a member of the British Astronomical Association, and, as of 2013, was chair of the Wymering Manor Trust in Portsmouth. She ran the League of Friends visiting team at the Queen Alexandra Hospital in Portsmouth for eight years. She is also a patron of the Music Man Project, a charity that provides musical opportunities to people with learning disabilities. Following the Russian invasion of Ukraine, she took a Ukrainian refugee into her home.

In July 2022, Hampshire Police said they were investigating death threats sent to Mordaunt. She strengthened her security after a letter was sent to her constituency office threatening to "shoot her in the head" and "kill her family".

In November 2025, a 61-year-old man was found guilty of stalking Mordaunt, following a trial at Southampton Crown Court. Mordaunt said she believed the man was a "real threat" and feared "sexual violence". A former Conservative councillor, he was jailed for 20 weeks.

== Decorations ==
- : Dame Commander of the Most Excellent Order of the British Empire (13 June 2025)
- : King Charles III Coronation Medal

== Publications ==
- Greater: Britain After the Storm (with Chris Lewis, 2021) ISBN 9781785906091
- Pomp & Circumstance: Why Britain’s Traditions Matter (with Chris Lewis, 2025) ISBN 9781785909948

Parliament of the United Kingdom
Preceded by Sarah McCarthy-Fry	Member of Parliament for Portsmouth North; 2010–2024	Succeeded by Amanda Martin
Political offices
Preceded by Nick Boles	Parliamentary Under-Secretary of State for Communities and Local Government; 2014–2015	Succeeded by James Wharton
Preceded by Mark Francois	Minister of State for the Armed Forces; 2015–2016	Succeeded by Mike Penning
Preceded by Justin Tomlinson	Minister of State for Disabled People, Work and Health; 2016–2017	Succeeded by Sarah Newton
Preceded by Priti Patel	Secretary of State for International Development; 2017–2019	Succeeded by Rory Stewart
Preceded by Amber Rudd	Minister for Women and Equalities; 2018–2019	Succeeded by Amber Rudd
Preceded by Gavin Williamson	Secretary of State for Defence; 2019	Succeeded by Ben Wallace
Preceded by Oliver Dowden	Paymaster General; 2020–2021	Succeeded by Michael Ellis
Preceded by Greg Hands	Minister of State for Trade Policy; 2021–2022	Succeeded by Conor Burns
Preceded by Mark Spencer	Leader of the House of Commons; 2022–2024	Succeeded by Lucy Powell
Preceded by Mark Spencer	Lord President of the Council; 2022–2024	Succeeded by Lucy Powell
