= Manisha Tank =

British television news presenter (born 1976)

Manisha Tank is a British television news presenter, presenting CNN Newsroom (CNNI) on CNN International.

== Education ==
Tank was educated at Regents Park Community College, in Southampton, Hampshire, followed by Taunton's College (also in Southampton), and the University of Oxford, where she studied Philosophy, Politics, and Economics.

== Life and career ==
Tank was first posted to New York in 1999 and reported from the Nasdaq and the New York Stock Exchange while working for Reuters Television. She returned to London to report on the EU markets and continued on presenting business news bulletins between London and New York. From 2002 to 2003, she presented the Six Forum, the interactive forum of the BBC Six O'Clock News. In 2004, Tank returned to New York but returned to London a few months later. She currently presents business news for CNN in Hong Kong. In 2007 Tank was awarded the Summerson Goodacre & Daily Telegraph Wealth Management Award for Best Industry Commentator. Manisha Tank has ceased to work for CNN and now works for Money FM, a branch of SPH radio. She began to work in MONEYFM on 12 September 2019

She is a committee member of Asians In Media current affairs magazine.
