= 1934 Portsmouth North by-election =

UK Parliamentary by-election

The 1934 Portsmouth North by-election was held on 19 February 1934. The by-election was held due to the elevation to the peerage of the incumbent Conservative MP, Bertram Godfray. It was won by the Conservative candidate, Sir Roger Keyes. Keyes had had prominent career in the Royal Navy and held the rank of Admiral of the Fleet. Labour's candidate was E. T. Humby, "a retired schoolmaster" and tutor for the Workers' Educational Association. He was also involved in extramural education programmes with the University of Oxford and the Southampton University College.

Portsmouth North by-election, 1934
Party	Candidate	Votes	%	±%
Conservative	Roger Keyes	17,582	59.6	−8.8
Labour	Edward Thomas Humby	11,904	40.4	+8.8
Majority		5,678	19.2	−17.6
Turnout		29,486	55.7	−18.8
Conservative hold		Swing	-8.8	

At the following year's general election Keyes again defeated Humby, increasing his majority to 11,454 votes.
