= Charles Little (Royal Navy officer) =

Royal Navy Admiral (1882–1973)

Admiral Sir Charles Little GCB GBE
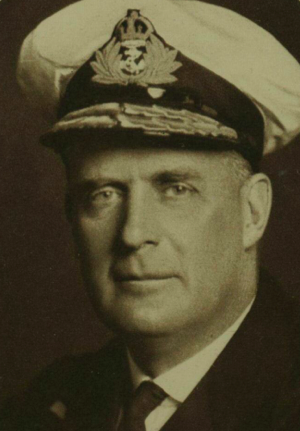
- Vice-Admiral Sir Charles Little in 1937, Commander-in-Chief of the China Station
- Born: 14 June 1882
- Died: 20 June 1973 (aged 91)
- Military career
- Allegiance: United Kingdom
- Branch: Royal Navy
- Service years: 1897–1945
- Rank: Admiral
- Commands: HMS Fearless; HMS Cleopatra; HMS Iron Duke; China Station
- Conflicts: World War I World War II
- Awards: Knight Grand Cross of the Order of the Bath; Knight Grand Cross of the Order of the British Empire

Admiral Sir Charles James Colebrooke Little GCB GBE (14 June 1882 – 20 June 1973) was a senior Royal Navy officer who went on to be Second Sea Lord and Chief of Naval Personnel.

== Naval career ==
Little joined the Royal Navy at the training ship Britannia in 1897. He served in World War I and commanded the cruiser HMS Fearless and the Grand Fleet Submarine Flotilla from 1916 to 1918.

After the war he commanded the cruiser HMS Cleopatra in the Baltic Sea and then, in 1920, became Director of the Trade Division at the Admiralty. He was appointed Captain of the Fleet for the Mediterranean Station in 1922 and then became a Senior Staff Officer at the Royal Naval War College in 1924. He became captain of the battleship HMS Iron Duke in 1926 and Director of the Royal Naval Staff College in 1927. He became Commander of the 2nd Battle Squadron in 1930 and Rear Admiral Submarines in 1931. He was appointed Deputy Chief of the Naval Staff in 1932, promoted vice-admiral on 1 September 1933, and appointed Commander-in-Chief of the China Station in 1936. In 1938 he became Second Sea Lord and Chief of Naval Personnel. In this capacity he was instrumental in establishing the Admiralty Torpedo, Mining and Electrical Training Establishment at Roedean School in Brighton.

He served in World War II becoming Head of British Joint Staff Mission to Washington D. C. in 1941 and Commander-in-Chief, Portsmouth in 1942. He retired in 1945.

He lived at Thakeham in West Sussex.

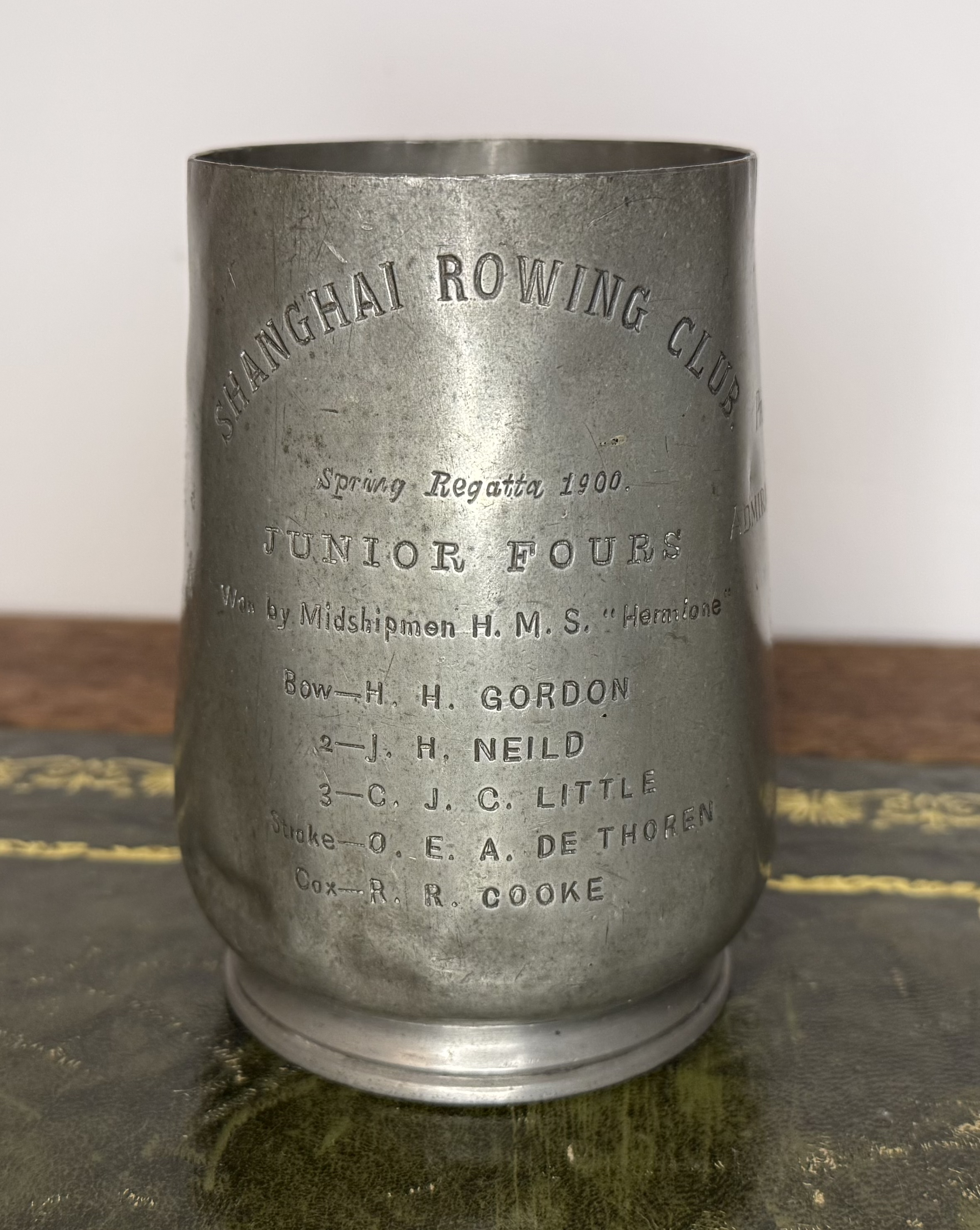
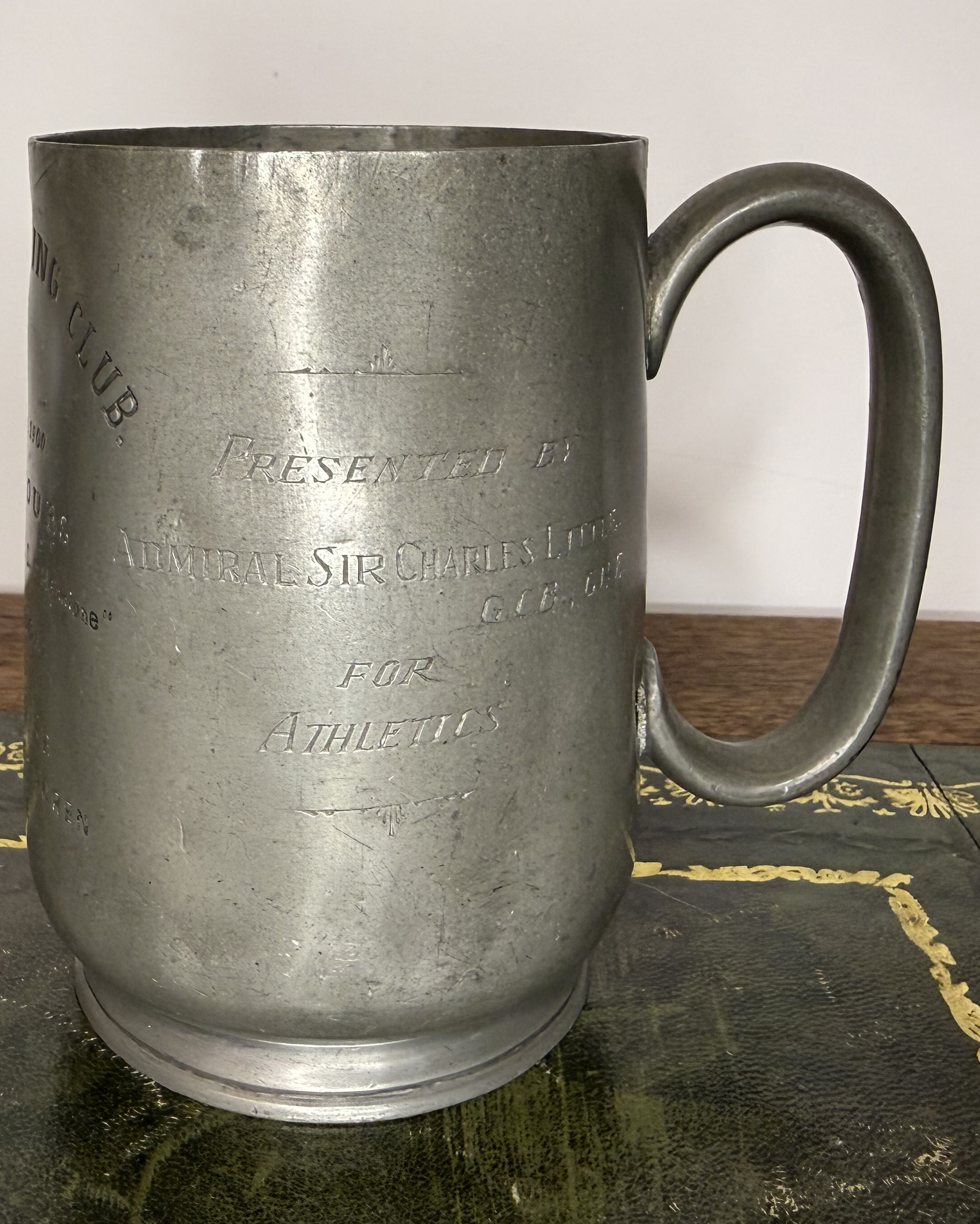
Pewter cup award from the Shanghai Rowing Club Spring Regatta 1900 won by (future admiral) Charles Little and four other midshipmen of HMS Hermione. Admiral Charles Little later presented this same cup as an award for athletics on or after 1945

Military offices
Preceded by Martin Dunbar-Nasmith	Rear-Admiral Submarines; 1931–1932	Succeeded by Noel Laurence
Preceded by Sir Frederic Dreyer	Deputy Chief of the Naval Staff; 1933–1935	Succeeded by Sir William James
Preceded by Sir Frederic Dreyer	Commander-in-Chief, China Station; 1936–1938	Succeeded by Sir Percy Noble
Preceded by Sir Martin Dunbar-Nasmith	Second Sea Lord; 1938–1941	Succeeded by Sir William Whitworth
Preceded by Sir William James	Commander-in-Chief, Portsmouth; 1942–1945	Succeeded by Sir Geoffrey Layton
