= Syd Rapson =

British politician (born 1942)

Member of Parliament for Portsmouth North
- In office 1 May 1997 – 11 April 2005
- Preceded by: Peter Griffiths
- Succeeded by: Sarah McCarthy-Fry

Personal details
- Born: Sydney Norman John Rapson; 17 April 1942 (age 84) Isle of Wight, England
- Party: Labour
- Children: 2

Sydney Norman John Rapson (born 17 April 1942) is a British former Labour politician who served as the MP for Portsmouth North from 1997 to 2005.

== Early life ==
Rapson moved with his family to the Paulsgrove area of Portsmouth as a young child, where he attended Paulsgrove Modern (now Castle View Academy, formerly King Richard School). After leaving school he worked in the aeronautical industry for nearly forty years and became a long serving councillor, serving as Lord Mayor of Portsmouth in 1990.

== Political career ==
Rapson was elected as the Labour Member of Parliament (MP) for Portsmouth North at the 1997 general election until he retired in 2005. He was succeeded by Sarah McCarthy-Fry.

Rapson stood for union improvement. He had stronger trade union credentials than many of the 1997 intake, having spent many years as an Amalgamated Engineering and Electrical Union activist and convener, which also gave him the strong interest in defence, the hallmark of his parliamentary career. He joined the Commons Defence Select Committee after the 2001 election. He sat for four years on the Accommodation and Works Committee.

== Other work ==
In 2001, Rapson was one of a number of MPs persuaded to appear in the satirical Channel 4 documentary series Brass Eye, which filmed him for its controversial "Paedogeddon" episode. He was filmed describing "trust-me trousers", which were supposedly worn by paedophiles and inflated to hide an erection. The programme-makers also persuaded him to say that paedophiles were using "an area of internet the size of Ireland". The MP complained to the Broadcasting Standards Commission that he had been duped into appearing on the show and that it had infringed his privacy. The BSC ruled against him, saying the means used to deceive the MPs "were justified in the context of the serious issues raised by the programme" and in particular "the dangers of people in the public eye speaking with apparent authority about matters they do not understand".

Rapson led the team that headed the development of Portsmouth City's Gunwharf Quays, a large leisure and retail center located near the Portsmouth docks and the district of Portsea.

In 2018, Rapson was awarded the key of the city for his contributions and accomplishments in regard to representation and contributions for the city. This award was last given in 2008 and is only held by 32 others over a century of Portsmouth's history.

Rapson retired in 2005 and still lives in Portchester and Portsmouth to this day, with his wife Phyllis. He has two children and four grandchildren.

Parliament of the United Kingdom
Preceded by Peter Griffiths	Member of Parliament for Portsmouth North; 1997 – 2005	Succeeded by Sarah McCarthy-Fry
