= Amanda Martin =

British Labour politician

Amanda Martin MP
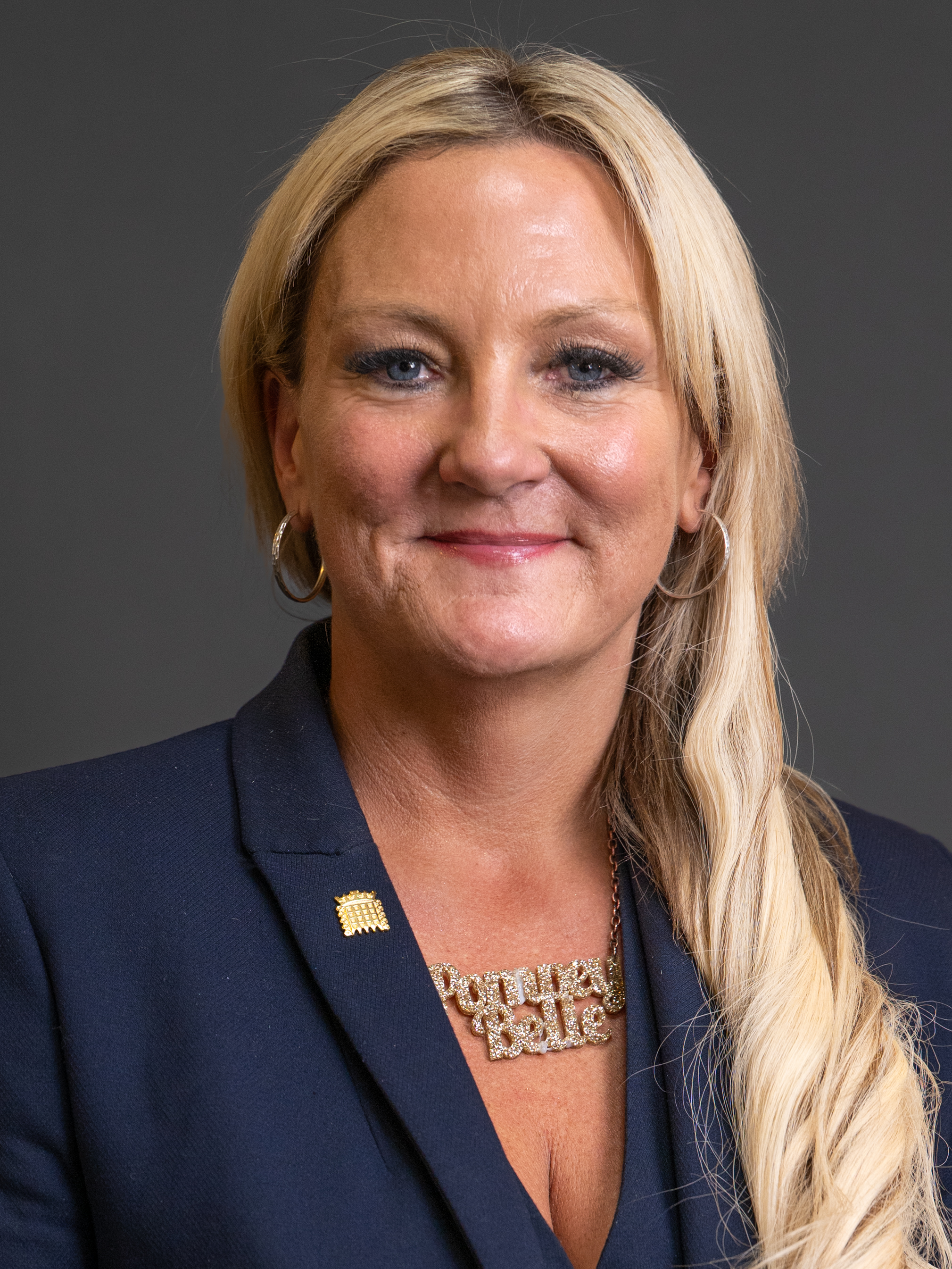
- Official portrait, 2025

Member of Parliament for Portsmouth North
- Incumbent
- Assumed office 4 July 2024
- Preceded by: Penny Mordaunt
- Majority: 780 (1.8%)

Personal details
- Born: Amanda Martin Portsmouth, Hampshire, England
- Party: Labour
- Children: 3
- Website: https://amandamartin.org.uk/

Amanda Martin is a British Labour Party politician and trade unionist who has been the Member of Parliament (MP) for Portsmouth North since 2024. She gained the seat from Conservative cabinet minister, Penny Mordaunt.

A native of Portsmouth, Martin originally worked as a teacher, becoming a school governor and education trustee. She also became chair of the Portsmouth Labour Party and she was once president of the National Education Union.

In September 2024 Martin was elected chair of the All-party parliamentary group on Gibraltar. In September 2025 she started a new role as parliamentary private secretary (PPS) to the Secretary of State for Education.

Parliament of the United Kingdom
Preceded by Penny Mordaunt	Member of Parliament for Portsmouth North; 2024–present	Incumbent
