= Castle View Academy =

High school in Portsmouth, England

Location
- Allaway Avenue; Portsmouth, Hampshire, PO6 4QP; England; 50.8495°N 1.1112°W

Information
- Type: Academy
- Established: 1952
- Local authority: Portsmouth City Council
- Trust: United Learning
- Department for Education URN: 145372 Tables
- Ofsted: Reports
- Principal: David Oakes/Matt Gill
- Gender: Co-educational
- Age: 11 to 16
- Enrolment: 550
- Website: www.castleviewacademy.org.uk

Castle View Academy is a co-educational secondary school located in the Paulsgrove area of Portsmouth in the English county of Hampshire.

== History ==
Established in 1952 as Paulsgrove Secondary Modern School – it was renamed King Richard School in 1975. In 2006, the school was awarded Arts College status for performing arts. The school has won and been runners up in the UK Rock Challenge and in 2006 students from King Richard School won the Rock Crew of the Year Award. A November 2009 Ofsted inspection assessed the school with Grade 3 (satisfactory). In October 2012, the school was Ofsted inspected again, and assessed the school as Grade 2 (Good).

In 2015, it was announced that the school would be demolished and replaced by a new building on the existing playing field, following a number of issues, including collapsed drains, a collapsed roof and flooding. In late 2017, former pupils were invited back for a tour around the building before it was demolished.

Previously a foundation school administered by Portsmouth City Council, in March 2018 King Richard School converted to academy status and renamed Castle View Academy. The school is now sponsored by United Learning.

== Academics ==
The school provides a mainstream National Curriculum education to GCSE, BTEC and OCR Nationals in ICT. Among the schools in the Portsmouth area that feed the school are Portsdown Primary, Beacon View, and St Paul's.
