= William James (Royal Navy officer, born 1881) =

British politician and Royal Navy Admiral (1881–1973)

Admiral Sir William James GCB
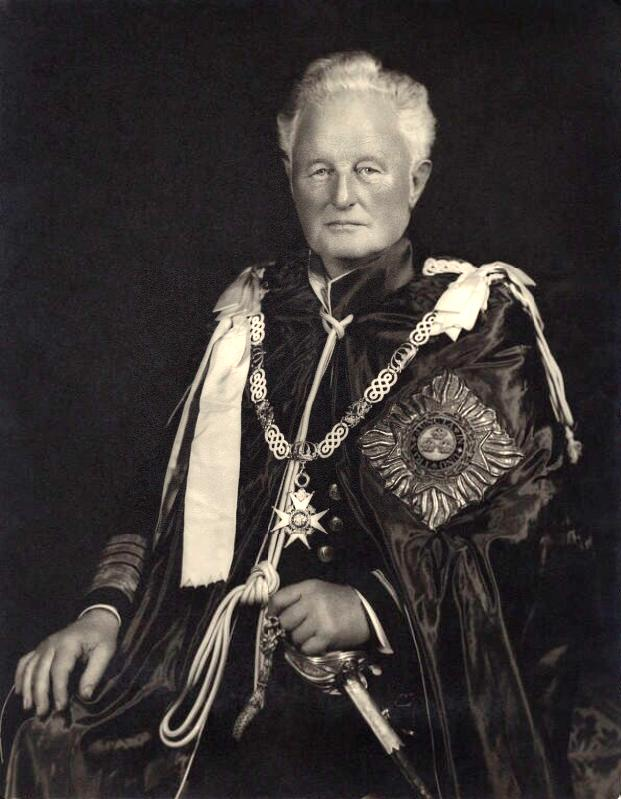
- Sir William Milbourne James wearing the mantle of the Order of the Bath
- Born: 22 December 1881; Hartley Wintney, Hampshire, England
- Died: 17 August 1973 (aged 91); Surrey
- Military career
- Allegiance: United Kingdom
- Branch: Royal Navy
- Service years: 1901–1944
- Rank: Admiral
- Nickname: "Sir Bubbles"
- Commands: Chief of Naval Information (1943–44); Portsmouth Naval Base (1939–42); Battlecruiser Squadron (1932–34); HMS Royal Sovereign (1926–27); Royal Naval College, Greenwich (1925–26); HMS Curlew (1919–21)
- Conflicts: First World War; Second World War
- Awards: Knight Grand Cross of the Order of the Bath; Légion d'honneur (France)
- Other work: Member of Parliament for Portsmouth North (1943–45); Deputy Lieutenant Surrey (1953–65); President, Union Jack Club (1955–64)

Admiral Sir William Milbourne James, GCB (22 December 1881 – 17 August 1973) was a British naval commander, politician and author. He served in the Royal Navy from the early 20th century to the Second World War. During the First World War, he was an integral part of the Naval Intelligence Division in its early years.

== Family ==
James was the son of Major W. C. James of the 16th Lancers and his wife Effie, daughter of the painter John Everett Millais. He was educated at Trinity College, Glenalmond, and HMS Britannia.

=== Bubbles ===
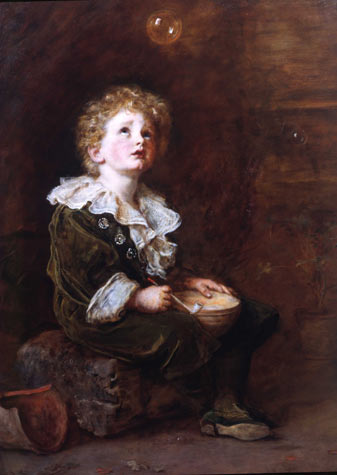
The five-year-old James in Bubbles

As a child, James sat as a subject for several paintings by his grandfather, Millais. The most well-known of these is Bubbles, in which the five-year-old William is shown gazing enraptured at a soap bubble he has just blown. When the painting was used in an advertisement for Pears soap, it became famous. The image dogged James throughout his life, and he was regularly nicknamed "Bubbles".

== Naval career ==
James pursued a career in the Royal Navy, rising to hold a number of important positions.

Following early service on the training ship HMS Britannia, he was confirmed in the rank of sub-lieutenant on 15 April 1901. He was posted to the destroyer HMS Skate on 7 October 1902, and promoted to lieutenant later the same year, when in November he was posted to the battleship HMS Venerable, on her first commission, to the Mediterranean Fleet. He achieved the rank of commander in 1913.

During the First World War he served as executive officer aboard the battlecruiser HMS Queen Mary, leaving the ship shortly before it sailed to its doom at the Battle of Jutland. He was flag commander to Vice Admiral Sir Doveton Sturdee, commanding the 4th Battle Squadron of the Grand Fleet in HMS Benbow from 1916 to 1917. Later in the war he assisted William Reginald Hall, the Director of Naval Intelligence, eventually becoming a deputy director. Hall and James worked together in "Room 40" which decrypted a number of crucial enemy signals relating to the Battle of Jutland, the plans of Roger Casement, and the Zimmermann Telegram. At one point James ran Room 40 on Hall's behalf. James related some of the events in his biography of Hall, published in 1955.

In the inter-war years, James served on the China Station as captain of HMS Curlew and chief of staff to the stations commander-in-chief from 1921 to 1922. From 1923, he was deputy director at the Royal Naval College, Greenwich, and Director in 1925. In 1926 he returned as flag captain of HMS Royal Sovereign. He went on to be Naval Assistant to the First Sea Lord in 1927, Chief of Staff to the Commander-in-Chief, Atlantic Fleet, in 1929 and Chief of Staff to the Commander-in-Chief, Mediterranean Fleet, in 1930.

In 1932 he took command of the Battlecruiser Squadron, with his flag in HMS Hood. He was promoted vice admiral on 30 September 1933, and from 1935 to 1938 he was Deputy Chief of the Naval Staff and a Lord Commissioner of the Admiralty. He was appointed a Knight Commander of the Order of the Bath in 1936.

From 1938 James was a full admiral.

During the Second World War, James served as Commander-in-Chief, Portsmouth, from 1939. In 1940 he commanded Operation Aerial, the evacuation of British troops from Brittany and Normandy, a parallel operation to the Dunkirk evacuation. In 1942 he was appointed as Chief of Naval Information, in charge of coordinating naval publicity.

James was elected in 1943 as Conservative Member of Parliament for the constituency of Portsmouth North, which he held until 1945. He retired from the Navy in 1944.

== Retirement ==
Following his retirement from public life, James was active in support for ventures relating to seafaring, supporting clubs such as the Elie and Earlsferry Sailing Club, which named their dinghy Bubbles in his honour. Most of his retirement was dedicated to his writings on aspects of British naval history.

== Writings ==
In addition to his biography of Hall, he published books and articles on other aspects of his wartime experiences, including an account of Winston Churchill's attitudes to naval affairs in Churchill by His Contemporaries. Other publications on naval matters included:

- New battleship organisations and notes for Executive Officers (1916)
- Songs of the sailor men (1916)
- The British Navy in adversity: a study of the American War of Independence (1926)
- Blue water and green fields (1939)
- Admiral Sir William Fisher (1943)
- The Portsmouth letters (1946)
- The British Navies in the Second World War (1946)
- The durable monument: Horatio Nelson (1948)
- The influence of sea power on the history of the British people (1948)
- Old oak : the life of Sir John Jervis, Earl of Vincent (1950)
- The sky was always blue (1951)
- The eyes of the navy: a biographical study of Admiral Sir Reginald Hall (1955)
- A great seaman: the life of Admiral of the Fleet Sir Henry Oliver (1956)

His most notable non-Naval publication was The Order of Release, the story of John Ruskin, Effie Gray and John Everett Millais told for the first time in their unpublished letters (1947), a collection of family letters detailing the romance between his grandparents. His grandmother Effie Gray had been married to John Ruskin when she fell in love with Millais. Her first marriage was annulled, due to non-consummation. James was the first to publish the full details of these events and to vindicate his grandmother, whose victimisation by the Ruskin family he documented. James's book has been the inspiration for at least two plays.

Military offices
Preceded by Wilfred Tomkinson	Commander, Battlecruiser Squadron; 1932–1934	Succeeded by Sir Sidney Bailey
Preceded by Sir Charles Little	Deputy Chief of the Naval Staff; 1935–1938	Succeeded by Sir Andrew Cunningham
Preceded by The Earl of Cork	Commander-in-Chief, Portsmouth; 1939–1942	Succeeded by Sir Charles Little
Parliament of the United Kingdom
Preceded by Sir Roger Keyes, Bt	Member of Parliament for Portsmouth North; 1943–1945	Succeeded by Donald Bruce
