= Donald Bruce, Baron Bruce of Donington =

British politician (1912–2005)

The Right Honourable The Lord Bruce of Donington

Member of Parliament for Portsmouth North
- In office 6 July 1945 – 3 February 1950
- Preceded by: William James
- Succeeded by: Constituency abolished

Member of the House of Lords
- Lord Temporal
- Life peerage 20 January 1975 – 18 April 2005

Personal details
- Born: Donald William Trevor Bruce; 3 October 1912 Norbury, London, England
- Died: 18 April 2005 (aged 92)
- Party: Labour
- Spouses: Joan Letitia Butcher (m. 1939; div. 1980) Cyrena Heard (m. 1981)
- Children: 4 (by Butcher)
- Education: Donington Grammar School
- Profession: Business

Military service
- Allegiance: United Kingdom
- Branch/service: British Army
- Rank: Major
- Unit: Royal Corps of Signals

Donald William Trevor Bruce, Baron Bruce of Donington (3 October 1912 – 18 April 2005) was a British soldier, businessman and Labour politician.

== Early life ==
Bruce was born in Norbury, South London, the son of insurance broker William Trevor Bruce. He was educated at Donington Grammar School in Donington, Lincolnshire and qualified as a Chartered Accountant in 1936.

== Military career ==
Bruce served in the Territorial Army from 1931 to 1935, later in World War II, in the Royal Signals, where he reached the rank of Major in 1942, serving in the anti-aircraft defence of London before joining Dwight D. Eisenhower's staff as an intelligence officer in the preparations for D-Day for which he won a mention in dispatches.

== Parliamentary career ==
From 1945 to 1950 Bruce was Labour Member of Parliament (MP) for Portsmouth North. During the same time he was Parliamentary Private Secretary to the Minister of Health Aneurin Bevan, and compiled many notes and documents with the aim of writing a biography of Bevan, a task later taken up with the assistance of Bruce's papers by Michael Foot.

When Portsmouth North was abolished in 1950, Bruce stood in the successor seat of Portsmouth West, but was narrowly beaten by the Conservative Terence Clarke.

== After Parliament ==
He also set up his own accountancy firm and ran it until 1977 when it merged with Halpern and Woolf which itself merged with Casson Beckman merging finally with Baker Tilly for whom Bruce still worked in his eighties as a consultant.

On 20 January 1975, he was created a life peer as Baron Bruce of Donington, of Rickmansworth in Hertfordshire. In 1976, he was appointed to the European Parliament, but resigned in 1979.

== Family ==
Lord Bruce of Donington was married twice, firstly to Joan Letitia Butcher in 1939, and after their divorce in 1980, secondly to Cyrena Heard (née Shaw) in 1981. He had four children by his first wife, one son and three daughters (two of whom predeceased him).

== Bibliography ==
- Bruce, Donald (1997). "Nye". In Goodman, Geoffrey (ed.). The State of the Nation: The Political Legacy of Aneurin Bevan. London: Gollancz. pp. 130–155. ISBN 0-575-06308-4.

Parliament of the United Kingdom
Preceded by William Milbourne James	Member of Parliament for Portsmouth North; 1945–1950	Constituency abolished
