= Regents Park Community College =

School in Southampton, England

Coordinates: 50°55′21.4″N 1°26′29.9″W

Location
- King Edward Avenue; Southampton, Hampshire; England

Information
- Type: Academy
- Local authority: Southampton
- Department for Education URN: 116450 Tables
- Ofsted: Reports
- Head teacher: Samantha Barnes
- Gender: Coeducational
- Age: 11 to 16
- Enrolment: 785
- Website: http://www.regentsparkcollege.org.uk

Regents Park Community College is a coeducational Secondary School in West Southampton, Hampshire, in the south of England.

== History ==
Initially an all-girls school, Regents' Park Community College started accepting boys from September 2008, as part of Southampton City Council's review of secondary education, called "Learning Futures".

Regents Park was placed into special measures during the 10–11 July 2013 Ofsted inspection, after being rated 'inadequate'.

In April 2018, Ofsted inspectors said of the school that "teaching is characterised by highly effective planning, secure subject knowledge among the teachers, the use of a wide range of teaching strategies and the use of detailed information about pupils."

In January 2026, Regents Park Community College converted to academy status and joined the United Learning multi-academy trust.

== Southampton Cooperative Learning Trust ==
Regents Park Community College was previously a member of the Southampton Co‑operative Learning Trust, a partnership formed with local schools and community organisations. The school remained part of the trust until its conversion to Academy in January 2026, when it joined the United Learning multi‑academy trust.

== Notable former pupils ==
- Len Stansbridge (1919–1986), goalkeeper for Southampton in the period either side of the Second World War.
- Manisha Tank, former BBC World presenter, and currently with CNN.
