= Paulsgrove =

Suburb of Portsmouth, Hampshire, England

Coordinates: 50.849308°N 1.093136°W

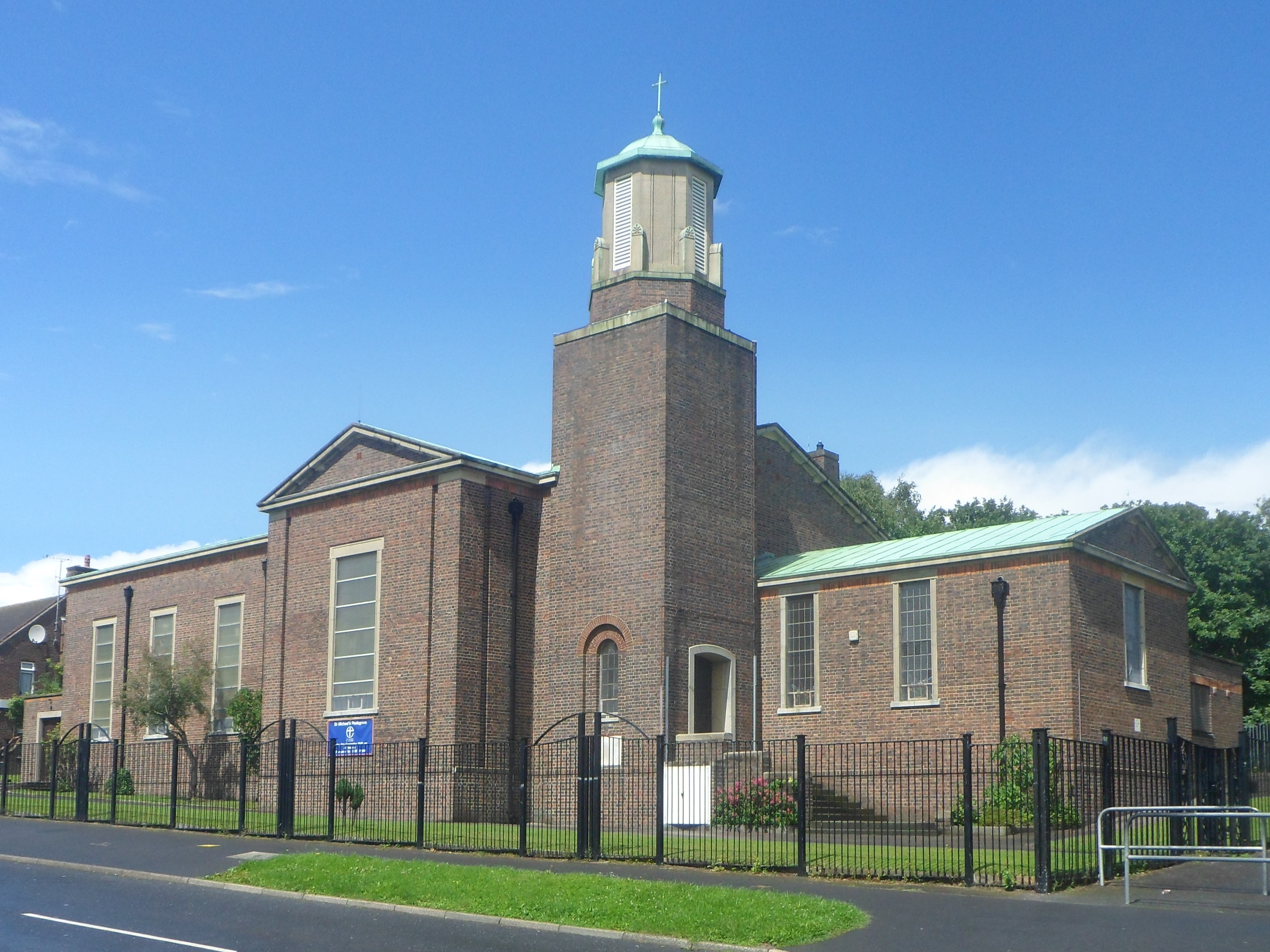
- St Michael and All Angels Church
- Population: 56,116 (2020 Census. Paulsgrove Ward)
- Unitary authority: Portsmouth
- Ceremonial county: Hampshire
- Region: South East
- Country: England
- Sovereign state: United Kingdom
- Post town: PORTSMOUTH
- Postcode district: PO6
- Dialling code: 023
- Police: Hampshire and Isle of Wight
- Fire: Hampshire and Isle of Wight
- Ambulance: South Central
- UK Parliament: Portsmouth North

Paulsgrove is an area of northern Portsmouth, Hampshire, England. Initially a small independent hamlet for many centuries, it was admitted to the city limits in 1920 and grew rapidly after the end of the Second World War.

== History ==
Paulsgrove existed as a small hamlet on the old Portsmouth to Southampton road for many years. During the early twentieth century Paulsgrove Racecourse was built north of the village on the slopes of Portsdown Hill and a railway halt built to cater for raceday traffic. The area was incorporated into the city of Portsmouth in 1920.

Towards the end of World War II it became clear that to the City Council that a massive programme of house building was needed to replace those homes destroyed by bombing. As part of this programme, land in Paulsgrove was purchased and building began in 1945. The initial housing was prefabricated but later houses were built more conventionally.

In August 2000, Paulsgrove made the national and international news as mobs of local residents attacked residences of suspected and convicted child sex offenders and other sex offenders. These disturbances came shortly after the News of the World put pressure on the government to give parents the right to know if their children are living close to a convicted sex offender, in response to the murder of Sarah Payne.

Paulsgrove Lake, a navigable water channel to the south of Paulsgrove in Portsmouth Harbour was named after Paulsgrove. However, an eastern section of Paulsgrove Lake was reclaimed during the 1970s and later developed into the Port Solent residential estate and marina basin, which opened on 29 July 1988.

The population of the Paulsgrove Ward at the 2011 Census was 14,010.

== Roads ==
A new section of Southampton Road between the railway bridge and a new roundabout on the A3 trunk road in Cosham; was built in 1958, replacing the older narrower section (later renamed Medina Road) as part of the main route between Portsmouth and Fareham.

A strip of open land was left throughout the estate during its construction in the 1950s to make way for the subsequent M27 motorway.

== Churches ==
- St Michael and All Angels, the parish church of Paulsgrove was established as a mission centre in 1947, whilst work commenced on building a new parish church. St. Michael and All Angels was formerly constituted as an ecclesiastical parish of the Church of England in the Diocese of Portsmouth when the new parish church was consecrated in July 1957. The parish stands in the Anglo-Catholic tradition of the Church of England. There have been seven Vicars of the parish since 1957.
- The Baptist church was built in 1954. It was the members of Kent Street Baptist Church, Portsea, which had been destroyed in the blitz, who decided to plant a church on the new Paulsgrove estate being built in the post-war years. Prior to its building, a Sunday School was run at (then) Paulsgrove Secondary Modern School and there was a regular attendance of about 500 children on a Sunday afternoon. When the Baptist Church opened it was decided to integrate it into the church. Some, if not all of the Sunday School leaders became founder members of the church.
- St Paul's church was built in 1970. It is a Roman Catholic church which is situated next to St. Paul's Primary School. The school and church are connected through the Roman Catholic religion, with the schools choir often performing at the church. In the late '90s the school collected awards and trophies for both its sporting achievements as well as several awards for its musical achievements through its choir.

== Education ==
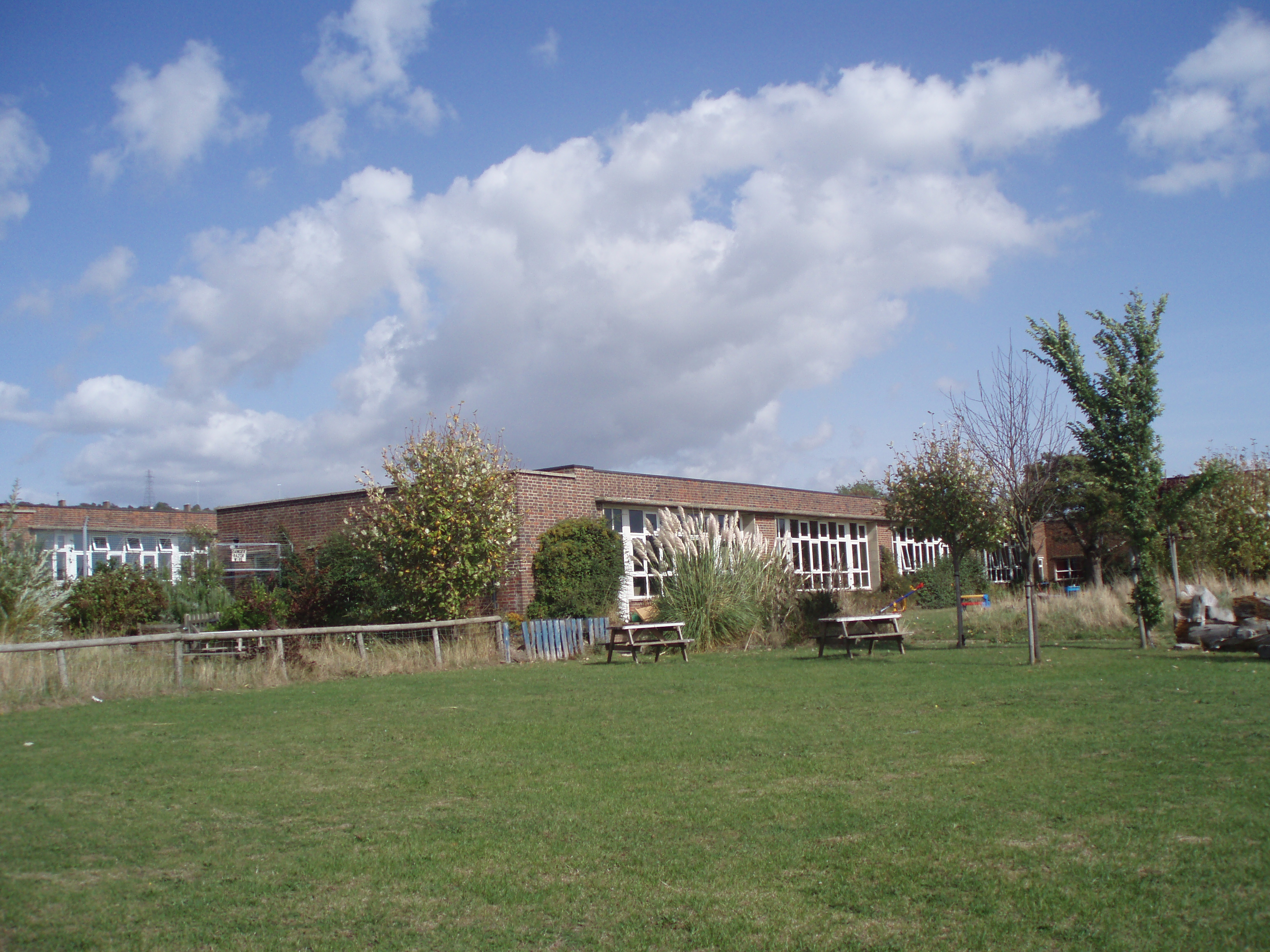
Paulsgrove Primary School

Paulsgrove Secondary Modern School opened in 1952 – it became King Richard School in 1975. In 2007 the school officially became an arts college. This means it is now a performing arts specialist. King Richard has also won and been runners up in the Rock Challenge. In 2006 students from King Richard School won Rock Challenges' stage crew of the year. In 2018 the school was renamed Castle View Academy.

Paulsgrove Primary School opened in the early 1950s to serve a new housing development made necessary by the number of people made homeless through bombing during the Second World War. It was opened by the Lord Mayor of Portsmouth (England), Sir Denis Daley on 24 October. In January 2013 it changed its name to Beacon View Primary Academy, and had a remodelled exterior look.

== Sport ==
Paulsgrove F.C. was formed in 1987, and currently play in the Hampshire Premier league at Paulsgrove Social Club, Marsden Road. In October 2007 the club gained a bye in the Hampshire Cup under somewhat unusual circumstances: drawn at home to play Kingston Arrows (a side composed entirely of long-stay prisoners), their opponents were unable to fulfil the fixture.

== Etymology ==
Paulsgrove is believed to be named for St. Paul who, according to apocryphal legend, landed at the site at the start of his visit to Britain when it was part of the Roman Empire. However a more likely explanation is revealed by certain old maps which show the area as PALS GRAVE, and is probably a reference to the last resting place of a (perhaps Saxon) local chief.

== Notable people ==
- Syd Rapson
- Joe Jackson (musician)
- Raji James
- Kevin Russell (footballer)
- Bobby Stokes
- Alan Pascoe
