= Thomas Sargant =

Thomas Sargant (17 August 1905 – 26 June 1988) was a British law reformer who campaigned for the promotion of human rights.

== Biography ==
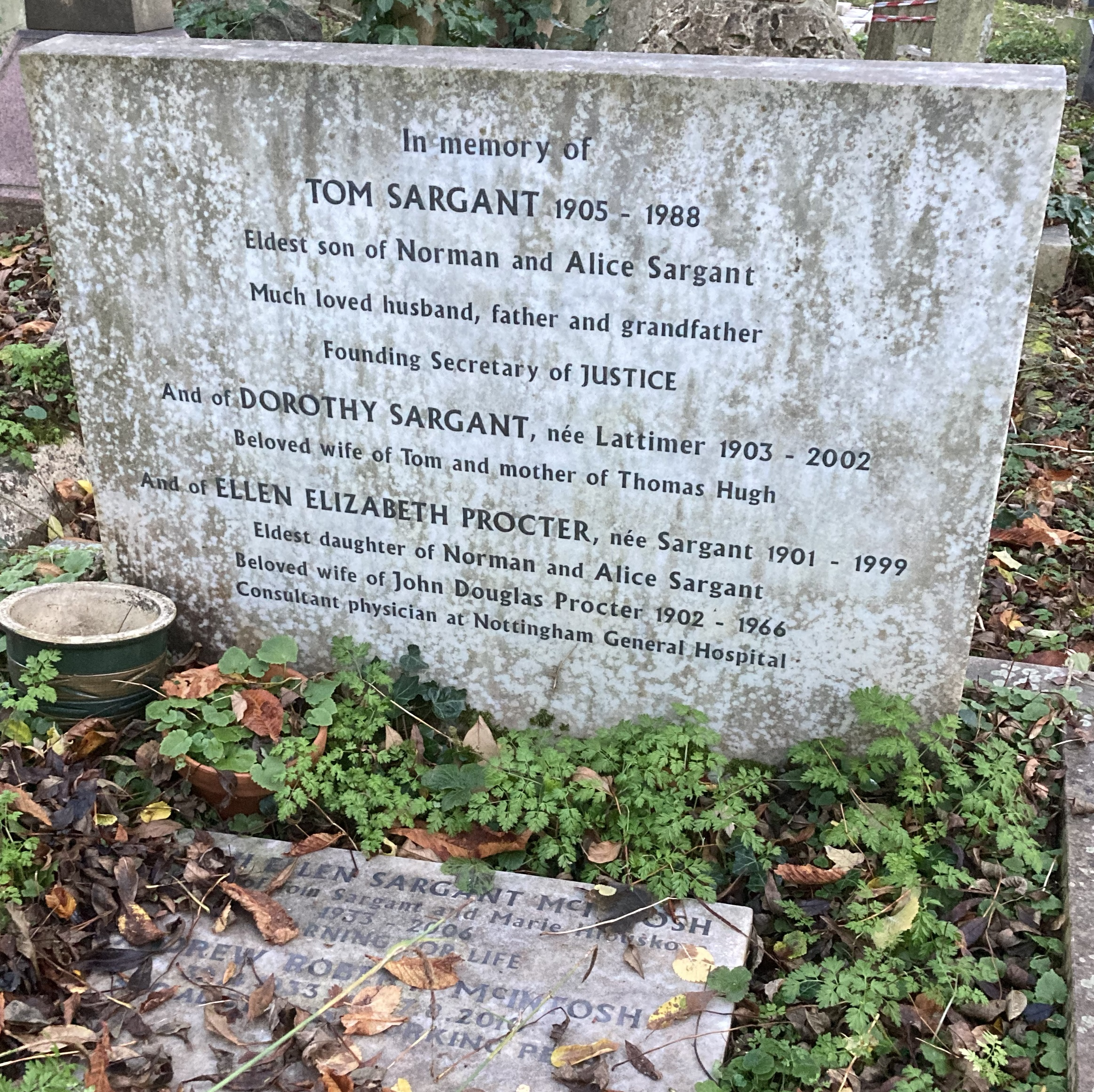
Grave of Tom Sargant in Highgate Cemetery

Sargant, who was educated at Highgate School, was for much of his life a businessman and politician who became increasingly concerned with the impact of the law and legal services upon ordinary people. In the mid-1950s, he was asked to help mobilise lawyers in support of those accused in treason trials in Hungary and South Africa, and JUSTICE was set up as a result. Tom Sargant became its first Secretary and was a driving force of the organisation until his retirement in 1982.

As a result of his commitment, persistence and determination, JUSTICE played a key role in taking up the cause of miscarriage of justice cases. Sargant's tireless campaigning resulted in some 25 people being released, or released early, from prison. He was instrumental in the establishment of the BBC series Rough Justice, which led to the release of 18 victims of miscarriages of justice.

He also played a major role in bringing about other key measures such as the creation of the office of Ombudsman and the establishment of the Criminal Injuries Compensation Scheme. In 1966 he was awarded an OBE and became a JP. He was made Honorary Master of Laws at Queen's University Belfast in 1977.

In 1989 the first Thomas Sargant Memorial Lecture was given in his memory and has been given every year since. The lectures are organised by JUSTICE.

Tom Sargant's daughter was the educationalist Naomi Sargant (1933–2006).

He is buried in a family grave on the eastern side of Highgate Cemetery.
