= List of United Kingdom MPs who died in the 2000s =

This is a list of individuals who were former or serving Members of Parliament for the House of Commons of the United Kingdom who died in the 2000s.

== 2000 ==
Individual	Party	Born	Died	Constituency(ies) represented	Election(s) won
Toby Low, 1st Baron Aldington	Conservative	25 May 1914	7 December 2000	Blackpool North	1945, 1950, 1951, 1955, 1959
Sir Jakie Astor	Conservative	29 August 1918	10 September 2000	Plymouth Sutton	1951, 1955
Wilfred Baker	Conservative	6 January 1920	9 November 2000	Banff	1964, 1966, 1970
Sir Reginald Bennett	Conservative	22 July 1911	19 December 2000	Gosport and Fareham Fareham	1950, 1951, 1955, 1959, 1964, 1966, 1970 1974 I & II
Bernard Braine, Baron Braine of Wheatley	Conservative	24 June 1914	5 January 2000	Billericay South East Essex Castle Point	1950, 1951 1955, 1959, 1964, 1966, 1970, 1974 I & II, 1979 1983, 1987
Bill Carr	Conservative	10 July 1918	December 2000	Barons Court	1959
Michael Colvin (in office)	Conservative	27 September 1932	24 February 2000	Bristol North West Romsey and Waterside Romsey	1979 1983, 1987, 1992 1997
Sir Julian Critchley	Conservative	8 December 1930	9 September 2000	Rochester and Chatham Aldershot	1959 1970, 1974 I & II, 1979, 1983, 1987, 1992
Donald Dewar (in office)	Labour	21 August 1937	11 October 2000	Aberdeen South Glasgow Garscadden Glasgow Anniesland	1966 1978 (by-election), 1979, 1983, 1987, 1992 1997
Bruce Douglas-Mann	Labour	23 June 1927	27 July 2000	Kensington North Mitcham and Morden	1970 1974 I & II, 1979
Frederick Erroll, 1st Baron Erroll of Hale	Conservative	27 May 1914	14 September 2000	Altrincham and Sale	1945, 1950, 1951, 1955, 1959
Andrew Faulds	Labour	1 March 1923	31 May 2000	Smethwick Warley East	1966, 1970 1974 I & II, 1979, 1983, 1987, 1992
Clifford Forsythe (in office)	Ulster Unionist	25 August 1929	27 April 2000	South Antrim	1983, 1987, 1992, 1997
Bernie Grant (in office)	Labour	17 February 1944	8 April 2000	Tottenham	1987, 1992, 1997
John Grant	Social Democratic (Labour from 1970 to 1981)	16 October 1932	29 September 2000	Islington East Islington Central	1970 1974 I & II, 1979
Sir Michael Hamilton	Conservative	5 July 1918	3 July 2000	Wellingborough Salisbury	1959 1965 (by-election), 1966, 1970, 1974 I & II, 1979
Willie Hamilton	Labour	26 June 1917	26 January 2000	West Fife Central Fife	1950, 1951, 1955, 1959, 1964, 1966, 1970 1974 I & II, 1979, 1983
Richard Harden	Ulster Unionist	12 December 1916	22 October 2000	Armagh	1948 (by-election), 1950, 1951
Harmar Harmar-Nicholls, Baron Harmar-Nicholls	Conservative	1 November 1912	15 September 2000	Peterborough	1950, 1951, 1955, 1959, 1964, 1966, 1970, 1974 I
Carol Johnson	Labour	24 November 1903	30 July 2000	Lewisham South	1959, 1964, 1966, 1970
Howard Johnson	Conservative	25 December 1910	13 September 2000	Brighton Kemptown	1950, 1951, 1955
Kenneth Lomas	Labour	16 November 1922	15 July 2000	Huddersfield West	1964, 1966, 1970, 1974 I & II
Gordon Matthews	Conservative	16 December 1908	4 February 2000	Meriden	1959
Robert Parry	Labour	8 January 1933	9 March 2000	Liverpool Exchange Liverpool Scotland Exchange Liverpool Riverside	1970 1974 I & II, 1979 1983, 1987, 1992
Albert Roberts	Labour	14 May 1908	11 May 2000	Normanton	1951, 1955, 1959, 1964, 1966, 1970, 1974 I & II, 1979
George Rodgers	Labour	7 November 1925	15 February 2000	Chorley	1974 I & II
Sir Giles Shaw	Conservative	16 November 1931	12 April 2000	Pudsey	1974 I & II, 1979, 1983, 1987, 1992
Roger White	Conservative	1 June 1928	16 February 2000	Gravesend	1970
Audrey Wise (in office)	Labour	4 January 1932	2 September 2000	Coventry South West Preston	1974 I & II 1987, 1992, 1997

== 2001 ==
Individual	Party	Born	Died	Constituency(ies) represented	Election(s) won
John Bidgood	Conservative	12 May 1914	17 August 2001	Bury and Radcliffe	1955, 1959
Roderic Bowen	Liberal	6 August 1913	19 July 2001	Cardiganshire	1945, 1950, 1951, 1955, 1959, 1964
Sir Eric Bullus	Conservative	20 November 1906	31 August 2001	Wembley North	1950, 1951, 1955, 1959, 1964, 1966, 1970
Jamie Cann (in office)	Labour	28 June 1946	15 October 2001	Ipswich	1992, 1997, 2001
Neil Carmichael, Baron Carmichael of Kelvingrove	Labour	10 October 1921	19 July 2001	Glasgow Woodside Glasgow Kelvingrove	1962 (by-election), 1964, 1966, 1970 1974 I & II, 1979
Michael Cocks, Baron Cocks of Hartcliffe	Labour	19 August 1929	26 March 2001	Bristol South	1970, 1974 I & II, 1979, 1983
Sir Charles Fletcher-Cooke	Conservative	5 May 1914	24 February 2001	Darwen	1951, 1955, 1959, 1964, 1966, 1970, 1974 I & II, 1979
Sir Edward Gardner	Conservative	10 May 1912	2 August 2001	Billericay Fylde South Fylde	1959, 1964 1970, 1974 I & II, 1979 1983
Sir Michael Grylls	Conservative	21 February 1934	7 February 2001	Chertsey North West Surrey	1970 1974 I & II, 1979, 1983, 1987, 1992
Quintin Hogg, Baron Hailsham of St Marylebone	Conservative	9 October 1907	12 October 2001	Oxford St Marylebone	1938 (by-election), 1945 1963 (by-election), 1964, 1966
Cledwyn Hughes, Baron Cledwyn of Penrhos	Labour	14 September 1916	22 February 2001	Anglesey	1951, 1955, 1959, 1964, 1970, 1974 I & II
Ernest Kinghorn	Labour	1 November 1907	15 January 2001	Yarmouth	1945, 1950
John MacKay, Baron MacKay of Ardbrecknish	Conservative	15 November 1938	21 February 2001	Argyll Argyll and Bute	1979 1983
John Maginnis	Ulster Unionist	7 March 1919	7 July 2001	Armagh	1959, 1964, 1966, 1970
Maurice Miller	Labour	16 August 1920	30 October 2001	Glasgow Kelvingrove East Kilbride	1964, 1966, 1970 1974 I & II, 1979, 1983
William Molloy, Baron Molloy	Labour	26 October 1918	26 May 2001	Ealing North	1964, 1966, 1970, 1974 I & II
Cranley Onslow, Baron Onslow of Woking	Conservative	8 June 1926	13 March 2001	Woking	1964, 1970, 1974 I & II, 1979, 1983, 1987, 1992
John Platts-Mills	Labour	4 October 1906	26 October 2001	Finsbury	1945
Sir Ray Powell (in office)	Labour	19 June 1928	7 December 2001	Ogmore	1979, 1983, 1987, 1992, 1997, 2001
Reg Prentice, Baron Prentice	Conservative (Labour from 1957 to 1977)	16 July 1923	18 January 2001	East Ham North Newham North East Daventry	1957 (by-election), 1959, 1964, 1966, 1970 1974 I & II 1979, 1983
Anthony Royle, Baron Fanshawe of Richmond	Conservative	27 March 1927	28 December 2001	Richmond	1959, 1964, 1966, 1970, 1974 I & II, 1979
Peter Shore, Baron Shore of Stepney	Labour	20 May 1924	24 September 2001	Stepney Stepney and Poplar Bethnal Green and Stepney	1964, 1966, 1970 1974 I & II, 1979 1983, 1987, 1992
Keith Stainton	Conservative	8 November 1921	3 November 2001	Sudbury and Woodbridge	1963 (by-election), 1964, 1966, 1970, 1974 I & II, 1979
William Whitlock	Labour	20 June 1918	2 November 2001	Nottingham North	1959, 1964, 1966, 1970, 1974 I & II, 1979
Montague Woodhouse, 5th Baron Terrington	Conservative	11 May 1917	13 February 2001	Oxford	1959, 1964, 1970, 1974 I

== 2002 ==
Individual	Party	Born	Died	Constituency(ies) represented	Election(s) won
Frank Allaun	Labour	27 February 1913	26 November 2002	Salford East	1955, 1959, 1964, 1966, 1970, 1974 I, 1974, 1979
Sir Frederic Bennett	Conservative	2 December 1918	14 September 2002	Reading North Torquay Torbay	1951 1955, 1959, 1964, 1966, 1970 1974 I & II, 1979, 1983
Tom Bradley	Social Democratic (Labour from 1962 to 1981)	13 April 1926	9 September 2002	Leicester North East Leicester East	1962 (by-election), 1964, 1966, 1970 1974 I & II, 1979
Jeremy Bray	Labour	29 June 1930	31 May 2002	Middlesbrough West Motherwell and Wishaw Motherwell South	1962 (by-election), 1964, 1966 1974 II, 1979 1983, 1987, 1992
Ronald Brown	Social Democratic (Labour from 1964 to 1981)	7 September 1921	27 July 2002	Shoreditch and Finsbury Hackney South and Shoreditch	1964, 1966, 1970 1974 I & II, 1979
Barbara Castle, Baroness Castle of Blackburn	Labour	6 October 1910	3 May 2002	Blackburn	1945, 1950, 1951, 1955, 1959, 1964, 1966, 1970, 1974 I & II
Douglas Crawford	Scottish National	1 November 1939	17 April 2002	Perth and East Perthshire	1974 II
Michael Coulson	Conservative	23 November 1927	18 June 2002	Kingston upon Hull North	1959
Bill Field	Labour	22 May 1909	11 October 2002	Paddington North	1946 (by-election), 1950, 1951
Maurice Foley	Labour	9 October 1925	8 February 2002	West Bromwich	1963 (by-election), 1964, 1966, 1970
Sir Marcus Fox	Conservative	11 June 1927	16 March 2002	Shipley	1970, 1974 I & II, 1979, 1983, 1987, 1992
Sir George Gardiner	Referendum (Conservative from 1974 to 1997)	3 March 1935	16 November 2002	Reigate	1974 I & II, 1979, 1983, 1987, 1992
David Gibson-Watt, Baron Gibson-Watt	Conservative	11 September 1918	7 February 2002	Hereford	1956 (by-election), 1959, 1964, 1966, 1970, 1974 I
Hugh Gray	Labour	19 April 1916	1 April 2002	Yarmouth	1966
Ian Grist	Conservative	5 December 1938	2 January 2002	Cardiff North Cardiff Central	1974 I & II, 1979 1983, 1987
Sir Paul Hawkins	Conservative	7 August 1912	29 December 2002	South West Norfolk	1964, 1966, 1970, 1974 I & II, 1979, 1983
Richard Wood, Baron Holderness	Conservative	5 October 1920	11 August 2002	Bridlington	1950, 1951, 1955, 1959, 1964, 1966, 1970, 1974 I & II
Sir Ian Clark Hutchison	Unionist	4 January 1903	2 February 2002	Edinburgh West	1941 (by-election), 1945, 1950, 1951, 1955
Tim Rathbone	Conservative	17 March 1933	12 July 2002	Lewes	1974 I & II, 1979, 1983, 1987, 1992
John Ryan	Labour	30 April 1940	26 March 2002	Uxbridge	1966
Neville Sandelson	Social Democratic (Labour from 1971 to 1981)	27 November 1923	12 January 2002	Hayes and Harlington	1971 (by-election), 1974 I & II, 1979
William Shepherd	Conservative	12 March 1910	11 October 2002	Bucklow Cheadle	1945 1950, 1951, 1955, 1959, 1964
Patrick Wolrige-Gordon	Conservative	10 August 1935	22 May 2002	East Aberdeenshire	1958 (by-election), 1959, 1964, 1966, 1970

== 2003 ==
Individual	Party	Born	Died	Constituency(ies) represented	Election(s) won
John Baldock	Conservative	19 November 1915	3 October 2003	Harborough	1950, 1951, 1955
Tom Boardman, Baron Boardman	Conservative	12 January 1919	10 March 2003	Leicester South West Leicester South	1967 (by-election), 1970 1974 I
Richard Buchanan	Labour	3 May 1912	22 January 2003	Glasgow Springburn	1964, 1966, 1970, 1974 I & II
Sir Antony Buck	Conservative	19 December 1928	6 October 2003	Colchester Colchester North	1961 (by-election), 1964, 1966, 1970, 1974 I & II, 1979 1983, 1987
Don Concannon	Labour	16 May 1930	14 December 2003	Mansfield	1966, 1970, 1974 I & 1974, 1979, 1983
Paul Daisley (in office)	Labour	20 July 1957	18 June 2003	Brent East	2001
Jack Dormand, Baron Dormand of Easington	Labour	27 August 1919	18 December 2003	Easington	1970, 1974 I & II, 1979, 1983
Bob Dunn	Conservative	14 July 1946	24 April 2003	Dartford	1979, 1983, 1987, 1992
Robert Gascoyne-Cecil, 6th Marquess of Salisbury	Conservative	19 December 1928	6 October 2003	Bournemouth West	1950, 1951
Peter Hardy, Baron Hardy of Wath	Labour	16 July 1931	16 December 2003	Rother Valley Wentworth	1970, 1974 I & II, 1979 1983, 1987, 1992
Roy Hughes, Baron Islwyn	Labour	9 June 1925	19 December 2003	Newport Newport East	1966, 1970, 1974 I & II, 1979 1983, 1987, 1992
Roy Jenkins, Baron Jenkins of Hillhead	Social Democratic (Labour from 1948 to 1981)	11 November 1920	5 January 2003	Southwark Central Birmingham Stechford Glasgow Hillhead	1948 (by-election) 1950, 1951, 1955, 1959, 1964, 1966, 1970, 1974 I & II 1982 (by-election), 1983
Walter Johnson	Labour	21 November 1917	12 April 2003	Derby South	1970, 1974 I & II, 1979
Aubrey Jones	Conservative	20 November 1911	10 April 2003	Birmingham Hall Green	1950, 1951, 1955, 1959, 1964
Eddie Loyden	Labour	3 May 1923	27 April 2003	Liverpool Garston	1974 I & II, 1983, 1987, 1992
Bob Mitchell	Social Democratic (Labour from 1966 to 1981)	22 August 1927	18 September 2003	Southampton Test Southampton Itchen	1966 1971 (by-election), 1974 I, II, 1979
Idris Owen	Conservative	18 February 1912	21 December 2003	Stockport North	1970
Hugh Rees	Conservative	8 January 1928	1 December 2003	Swansea West	1959
Hartley Shawcross, Baron Shawcross	Labour	4 February 1902	10 July 2003	St Helens	1945, 1950, 1951, 1955
Sir William Shelton	Conservative	30 October 1929	2 January 2003	Clapham Streatham	1970 1974 I & II, 1979, 1983, 1987
Renée Short	Labour	26 April 1919	18 January 2003	Wolverhampton North East	1964, 1966, 1970, 1974 I & II, 1979, 1983
Anthony Stodart, Baron Stodart of Leaston	Conservative	6 June 1916	31 May 2003	Edinburgh West	1959, 1964, 1966, 1970, 1974 I
Sir John Stokes	Conservative	23 July 1917	27 June 2003	Oldbury and Halesowen Halesowen and Stourbridge	1970 1974 I & II, 1979, 1983, 1987
Frank Taylor	Conservative	10 October 1907	1 October 2003	Manchester Moss Side	1961 (by-election), 1964, 1966, 1970
Sir Gerard Vaughan	Conservative	11 June 1923	29 July 2003	Reading Reading South Reading East	1970 1974 I & II, 1979 1983, 1987, 1992
Richard Wainwright	Liberal	11 April 1918	16 January 2003	Colne Valley	1966, 1974 I & II, 1979, 1983
Harold Walker, Baron Walker of Doncaster	Labour	12 July 1927	11 November 2003	Doncaster Doncaster Central	1964, 1966, 1970, 1974 I & II, 1979 1983, 1987, 1992
George Wallace, Baron Wallace of Coslany	Labour	18 April 1906	11 November 2003	Chislehurst Norwich North	1945 1964, 1966, 1970
Lady Beatrice Wright	Conservative	17 June 1910	17 March 2003	Bodmin	1941 (by-election)
Esmond Wright	Conservative	5 November 1915	9 August 2003	Glasgow Pollok	1967 (by-election)
David Young	Labour	12 October 1930	1 January 2003	Bolton East Bolton South East	1974 I & II, 1979 1983, 1987, 1992
George Younger, 4th Viscount Younger of Leckie	Conservative	22 September 1931	26 January 2003	Ayr	1964, 1966, 1970, 1974 I & II, 1979, 1983, 1987

== 2004 ==
Individual	Party	Born	Died	Constituency(ies) represented	Election(s) won
Michael Alison	Conservative	27 June 1926	28 May 2004	Barkston Ash Selby	1964, 1966, 1970, 1974 I & II, 1979 1983, 1987, 1992
Thomas Christopher Boyd	Labour	14 August 1916	15 March 2004	Bristol North West	1955
Percy Browne	Conservative	2 May 1923	5 March 2004	Torrington	1959
Sir Paul Bryan	Conservative	3 August 1913	11 October 2004	Howden Boothferry	1955, 1959, 1964, 1966, 1970, 1974 I & II, 1979 1983
Lewis Carter-Jones	Labour	17 November 1920	26 August 2004	Eccles	1964, 1966, 1970, 1974 I & II, 1979, 1983
William Clark, Baron Clark of Kempston	Conservative	18 October 1917	6 October 2004	Nottingham South Surrey East Croydon South	1959, 1964 1970 1974 I & II, 1979, 1983, 1987
Stan Cohen	Labour	31 July 1927	23 February 2004	Leeds South East	1970, 1974 I & II, 1979
John Cordle	Conservative	11 October 1912	23 November 2004	Bournemouth East and Christchurch Bournemouth	1959, 1964, 1966, 1970 1974 I & II
Nigel Davies	Conservative	2 September 1920	25 September 2004	Epping	1950
Jack Diamond, Baron Diamond	Labour	30 April 1907	3 April 2004	Manchester Blackley Gloucester	1945, 1950 1957 (by-election), 1959, 1964, 1966
Sir Peter Emery	Conservative	27 February 1926	9 December 2004	Reading Honiton East Devon	1959, 1964 1967 (by-election), 1970, 1974 I & II, 1979, 1983, 1987, 1992 1997
Geraint Howells, Baron Geraint	Liberal Democrats	15 April 1925	17 April 2004	Cardigan Ceredigion and Pembroke North	1974 I & II, 1979 1983, 1987
Hugh Jenkins, Baron Jenkins of Putney	Labour	27 July 1908	26 January 2004	Putney	1964, 1966, 1970, 1974 I & II
Ron Ledger	Labour	7 November 1920	11 December 2004	Romford	1955, 1959, 1964, 1966
Jim Marshall (in office)	Labour	13 March 1941	27 May 2004	Leicester South	1974 II, 1979, 1987, 1992, 1997, 2001
Sir Anthony Meyer, 3rd Baronet	Conservative	27 October 1920	24 December 2004	Eton and Slough West Flintshire Clwyd North West	1964 1970, 1974 I & II, 1979 1983, 1987
Nigel Nicolson	Conservative	19 January 1917	23 September 2004	Bournemouth East and Christchurch	1952 (by-election), 1955
Sir John Peel	Conservative	16 June 1912	8 May 2004	Leicester South East	1957 (by-election), 1959, 1964, 1966, 1970
Mervyn Pike, Baroness Pike	Conservative	16 September 1918	11 January 2004	Melton	1956 (by-election), 1959, 1964, 1966, 1970
Sir Julian Ridsdale	Conservative	8 June 1915	21 July 2004	Harwich	1954 (by-election), 1955, 1959, 1964, 1966, 1970, 1974 I & II, 1979, 1983, 1987
Sir Trevor Skeet	Conservative	28 January 1918	14 August 2004	Willesden East Bedford North Bedfordshire	1959 1970, 1974 I & II, 1979 1983, 1987, 1992
Malcolm St Clair	Conservative	16 February 1927	1 February 2004	Bristol South East	1961 (by-election)
Ivor Stanbrook	Conservative	13 January 1924	18 February 2004	Orpington	1970, 1974 I & II, 1979, 1983, 1987
Geoffrey Stewart-Smith	Conservative	29 December 1933	13 March 2004	Belper	1970
John Watkinson	Labour	25 January 1941	21 September 2004	Gloucestershire West	1974 II
Harry West	Ulster Unionist	27 March 1917	5 February 2004	Fermanagh and South Tyrone	1974 I

== 2005 ==
Individual	Party	Born	Died	Constituency(ies) represented	Election(s) won
Anthony Barber, Baron Barber	Conservative	4 July 1920	16 December 2005	Doncaster Altrincham and Sale	1951, 1955, 1959 1965 (by-election), 1966, 1970, 1974 I
Donald Bruce, Baron Bruce of Donington	Conservative	3 October 1912	18 April 2005	Portsmouth North	1945
James Callaghan, Baron Callaghan of Cardiff	Labour	27 March 1912	26 March 2005	Cardiff South Cardiff South East Cardiff South and Penarth	1945 1950, 1951, 1955, 1959, 1964, 1966, 1970, 1974 I & II, 1979 1983
Patsy Calton (in office)	Liberal Democrats	19 September 1948	29 May 2005	Cheadle	2001, 2005
Gordon Campbell, Baron Campbell of Croy	Conservative	8 June 1921	26 April 2005	Moray and Nairn	1959, 1964, 1966, 1970
Mark Carlisle, Baron Carlisle of Bucklow	Conservative	7 July 1929	14 July 2005	Runcorn Warrington South	1964, 1966, 1970, 1974 I & II, 1979 1983
Robin Cook (in office)	Labour	28 February 1946	6 August 2005	Edinburgh Central Livingston	1974 I & II, 1979 1983, 1987, 1992, 1997, 2001, 2005
Uvedale Corbett	Conservative	12 September 1909	1 September 2005	Ludlow	1945, 1950
Sir Frederick Corfield	Conservative	1 June 1915	25 August 2005	South Gloucestershire	1955, 1959, 1964, 1966, 1970
Gwynfor Evans	Plaid Cymru	1 September 1912	21 April 2005	Carmarthen	1966, 1974 II
Doris Fisher, Baroness Fisher of Rednal	Labour	13 September 1919	18 December 2005	Birmingham Ladywood	1970
Gerry Fitt, Baron Fitt	Social Democratic and Labour	9 April 1926	26 August 2005	Belfast West	1966, 1970, 1974 I & II, 1979
James Hamilton	Labour	11 March 1918	11 April 2005	Bothwell Motherwell North	1964, 1966, 1970, 1974 I & II, 1979 1983
Sir Stephen Hastings	Conservative	4 May 1921	10 January 2005	Mid Bedfordshire	1960 (by-election), 1964, 1966, 1970, 1974 I & II, 1979
Sir Edward Heath	Conservative	9 July 1916	17 July 2005	Bexley Sidcup Old Bexley and Sidcup	1950, 1951, 1955, 1959, 1964, 1966, 1970 1974 I & II, 1979 1983, 1987, 1992, 1997
Peter Hubbard-Miles	Conservative	9 May 1927	1 October 2005	Bridgend	1983
Sir Edwin Leather	Conservative	22 May 1919	5 April 2005	North Somerset	1950, 1951, 1955, 1959
Andrew McMahon	Labour	18 March 1920	26 April 2005	Glasgow Govan	1979
Sir Charles Morrison	Conservative	25 June 1932	9 May 2005	Devizes	1964, 1966, 1970, 1974 I & II, 1979, 1983, 1987
Mo Mowlam	Labour	18 September 1949	19 August 2005	Redcar	1987, 1992, 1997
Gordon Oakes	Labour	22 June 1931	15 August 2005	Bolton West Widnes Halton	1964, 1966 1971 (by-election), 1974 I & II, 1979 1983, 1987, 1992
Stanley Orme, Baron Orme	Labour	5 April 1923	27 April 2005	Salford West Salford East	1964, 1966, 1970, 1974 I & II, 1979 1983, 1987, 1992
Sir Nicholas Scott	Conservative	5 August 1933	6 January 2005	Paddington South Chelsea	1966, 1970 1974 II, 1979, 1983, 1987, 1992
Sir George Sinclair	Conservative	6 November 1912	21 September 2005	Dorking	1964, 1966, 1970, 1974 I & II
Sir Donald Thompson	Conservative	3 November 1931	14 March 2005	Sowerby Calder Valley	1979 1983, 1987, 1992
John Tilley	Labour	13 June 1941	18 December 2005	Lambeth Central	1978 (by-election), 1979
Horace Trevor-Cox	Conservative	14 June 1908	30 October 2005	Stalybridge and Hyde	1937 (by-election)
Derek Page, Baron Whaddon	Labour	14 August 1927	16 August 2005	Kings Lynn	1964, 1966
Phillip Whitehead	Labour	30 May 1937	31 December 2005	Derby North	1970, 1974 I & II, 1979
Norman Wylie, Lord Wylie	Conservative	26 October 1923	7 September 2005	Edinburgh Pentlands	1964, 1966, 1970

== 2006 ==
Individual	Party	Born	Died	Constituency(ies) represented	Election(s) won
Sir Anthony Beaumont-Daek	Conservative	11 October 1932	2 April 2006	Birmingham Selly Oak	1979, 1983, 1987
Roland Boyes	Labour	12 February 1937	16 June 2006	Houghton and Washington	1983, 1987, 1992
John Butcher	Conservative	13 February 1946	25 December 2006	Coventry South West	1979, 1983, 1987, 1992
Sir Douglas Dodds-Parker	Conservative	5 July 1909	13 September 2006	Banbury Cheltenham	1945, 1950, 1951, 1955 1964, 1966, 1970, 1974 I
John Dunwoody	Labour	3 June 1929	26 January 2006	Falmouth and Camborne	1966
Margaret Ewing	Scottish National	1 September 1945	21 March 2006	East Dunbartonshire Moray	1974 II 1987, 1992, 1997
Martin Flannery	Labour	2 March 1918	16 October 2006	Sheffield Hillsborough	1974 I & II, 1979, 1983, 1987
Eric Forth (in office)	Conservative	9 September 1944	17 May 2006	Mid Worcestershire Bromley and Chislehurst	1983, 1987, 1992 1997, 2001, 2005
Reg Freeson	Labour	24 February 1926	9 October 2006	Willesden East Brent East	1964, 1966, 1970 1974 I & II, 1979, 1983
Sir Victor Goodhew	Conservative	30 November 1919	11 October 2006	St Albans	1959, 1964, 1966, 1970, 1974 I & II, 1979
Hamish Gray, Baron Gray of Contin	Conservative	28 June 1927	14 March 2006	Ross and Cromarty	1970, 1974 I & II, 1979
Douglas Henderson	Scottish National	16 July 1935	15 September 2006	East Aberdeenshire	1974 I & II
Kevin Hughes	Labour	15 December 1952	16 July 2006	Doncaster North	1992, 1997, 2001
Antony Lambton	Conservative	10 July 1922	30 December 2006	Berwick-upon-Tweed	1951, 1955, 1959, 1964, 1966, 1970
Peter Law (in office)	Independent	1 April 1948	25 April 2006	Blaenau Gwent	2005
Sir Ian Lloyd	Conservative	30 May 1921	25 September 2006	Portsmouth Langstone Havant and Waterloo Havant	1964, 1966, 1970 1974 I & II, 1979 1983, 1987
Frank Marsden	Labour	15 October 1923	5 November 2006	Liverpool Scotland	1971 (by-election)
Sir Michael Marshall	Conservative	21 June 1930	6 September 2006	Arundel	1974 I & II, 1979, 1983, 1987, 1992
Sir Carol Mather	Conservative	3 January 1919	3 July 2006	Esher	1970, 1974 I & II, 1979, 1983
Hugh McCartney	Labour	3 January 1920	28 February 2006	East Dunbartonshire Central Dunbartonshire Clydebank and Milngavie	1970 1974 I & II, 1979 1983
Hector Monro, Baron Monro of Langholm	Conservative	4 October 1922	30 August 2006	Dumfries	1964, 1966, 1970, 1974 I & II, 1979, 1983, 1987, 1992
Brian Parkyn	Labour	28 April 1928	22 March 2006	Bedford	1966
John Peyton, Baron Peyton of Yeovil	Conservative	13 February 1919	22 November 2006	Yeovil	1951, 1955, 1959, 1964, 1966, 1970, 1974 I & II, 1979
John Profumo, 5th Baron Profumo	Conservative	30 January 1915	9 March 2006	Kettering Stratford-on-Avon	1940 (by-election) 1950, 1951, 1955, 1959
Joan Quennell	Conservative	23 December 1923	2 July 2006	Petersfield	1960 (by-election), 1964, 1966, 1970, 1974 I
Peter Rawlinson, Baron Rawlinson of Ewell	Conservative	26 June 1919	28 June 2006	Epsom Epsom and Ewell	1955, 1959, 1964, 1966, 1970 1974 I & II
Robert Redmond	Conservative	10 September 1919	12 March 2006	Bolton West	1970, 1974 I
Merlyn Rees, Baron Merlyn-Rees	Labour	18 December 1920	5 January 2006	Leeds South Morley and Leeds South	1963 (by-election), 1964, 1966, 1970, 1974 I, II, 1979 1983, 1987
Jack Simon, Baron Simon of Glaisdale	Conservative	15 January 1911	7 May 2006	Middlesbrough West	1951, 1955, 1959
Sir Peter Smithers	Conservative	9 December 1913	8 June 2006	Winchester	1950, 1951, 1955, 1959
Rachel Squire (in office)	Labour	13 July 1954	5 January 2006	Dunfermline West Dunfermline and West Fife	1992, 1997, 2001 2005
Tony Banks, Baron Stratford	Labour	8 April 1942	8 January 2006	Newham North West West Ham	1983, 1987, 1992 1997, 2001
Stefan Terlezki	Conservative	29 October 1927	21 February 2006	Cardiff West	1983
John Woollam	Conservative	14 August 1927	1 February 2006	Liverpool West Derby	1954 (by-election), 1955, 1959

== 2007 ==
Individual	Party	Born	Died	Constituency(ies) represented	Election(s) won
John Biffen, Baron Biffen	Conservative	3 November 1930	14 August 2007	Oswestry Shropshire North	1961 (by-election), 1964, 1966, 1970, 1974 I & II, 1979 1983, 1987, 1992
Ron Brown	Labour	29 June 1938	3 August 2007	Edinburgh Leith	1979, 1983, 1987
Ian Campbell	Labour	26 April 1926	9 September 2007	Dunbartonshire West Dumbarton	1970, 1974 I & II, 1979 1983
Bill Deedes, Baron Deedes	Conservative	1 June 1913	17 August 2007	Ashford	1950, 1951, 1955, 1959, 1964, 1966, 1970, 1974 I
William Edwards	Labour	6 January 1938	16 August 2007	Merionethshire	1966, 1970
Harry Ewing, Baron Ewing of Kirkford	Labour	20 January 1931	9 June 2007	Stirling and Falkirk Stirling, Falkirk and Grangemouth Falkirk East	1971 (by-election) 1974 I & II, 1979 1983, 1987
John Forrester	Labour	17 June 1924	24 November 2007	Stoke-on-Trent North	1966, 1970, 1974 I & II, 1979, 1983
John Garrett	Labour	8 September 1931	11 September 2007	Norwich South	1974 I & II, 1979, 1987, 1992
Ian Gilmour, Baron Gilmour of Craigmillar	Conservative	8 July 1926	21 September 2007	Central Norfolk Chesham and Amersham	1962 (by-election), 1964, 1966, 1970 1974 I & II, 1979, 1983, 1987
Sir John Gilmour, 3rd Baronet	Conservative	24 October 1912	1 June 2007	East Fife	1961 (by-election), 1964, 1966, 1970, 1974 I & II
John Hill	Conservative	13 November 1912	6 December 2007	South Norfolk	1955 (by-election), 1955, 1959, 1964, 1966, 1970
Richard Hornby	Conservative	20 June 1922	22 September 2007	Tonbridge	1956 (by-election), 1959, 1964, 1966, 1970
Lena Jeger, Baroness Jeger	Labour	19 November 1915	26 February 2007	Holborn and St Pancras South	1953 (by-election), 1955, 1964, 1966, 1970, 1974 I & II
Fiona Jones	Labour	27 February 1957	28 January 2007	Newark	1997
Robert Jones	Conservative	26 September 1950	16 April 2007	West Hertfordshire	1983, 1987, 1992
Paul Channon, Baron Kelvedon	Conservative	9 October 1935	27 January 2007	Southend West	1959 (by-election), 1959, 1964, 1966, 1970, 1974 I & II, 1979, 1983, 1987, 1992
Piara Khabra (in office)	Labour	20 November 1921	19 June 2007	Ealing Southall	1992, 1997, 2001, 2005
James Lamond	Labour	29 November 1928	20 November 2007	Oldham East Oldham Central and Royton	1970, 1974 I & II, 1979 1983, 1987
Sir John Loveridge	Conservative	9 September 1925	13 November 2007	Hornchurch Upminster	1970 1974 I & II, 1979
Ian MacArthur	Conservative	17 May 1925	30 November 2007	Perth and East Perthshire	1959, 1964, 1966, 1970, 1974 I
Norman Miscampbell	Conservative	20 February 1925	16 February 2007	Blackpool North	1962 (by-election), 1964, 1966, 1970, 1974 I & II, 1979, 1983, 1987
David Renton, Baron Renton	Conservative (National Liberal from 1945 to 1968)	12 August 1908	24 May 2007	Huntingdonshire	1945, 1950, 1951, 1959, 1964, 1966, 1970, 1974 I & II
John Scott, 9th Duke of Buccleuch	Unionist	28 September 1923	4 September 2007	Edinburgh North	1960 (by-election), 1964, 1966, 1970
Sir John Smith	Conservative	3 April 1923	28 February 2007	Cities of London and Westminster	1965 (by-election), 1966
Stan Thorne	Labour	22 July 1918	26 November 2007	Preston South Preston	1974 I & II, 1979 1983
Sir Cecil Walker	Ulster Unionist	17 December 1924	3 January 2007	Belfast North	1983, 1987, 1992, 1997
Bernard Weatherill, Baron Weatherill	Speaker (Conservative from 1964 to 1983)	25 November 1920	6 May 2007	Croydon North East	1964, 1966, 1970, I & II, 1979, 1983, 1987

== 2008 ==
Individual	Party	Born	Died	Constituency(ies) represented	Election(s) won
Leo Abse	Labour	22 April 1917	19 August 2008	Pontypool Torfaen	1958 (by-election), 1959, 1964, 1966, 1970, 1974 I & II, 1979 1983
Richard Alexander	Conservative	29 June 1934	20 April 2008	Newark	1979, 1983, 1987, 1992
Daniel Awdry	Conservative	10 September 1924	11 October 2008	Chippenham	1962 (by-election), 1964, 1966, 1970, 1974 I & II
Hugh Brown	Labour	18 May 1919	10 March 2008	Glasgow Provan	1964, 1966, 1970, 1974 I & II, 1979, 1983
Sir Adam Butler	Conservative	11 October 1931	9 January 2008	Bosworth	1970, 1974 I & II, 1979, 1983
Gwyneth Dunwoody (in office)	Labour	12 December 1930	17 April 2008	Exeter Crewe Crewe and Nantwich	1966 1974 I & II, 1979 1983, 1987, 1992, 1997, 2001, 2005
David Evans	Conservative	23 April 1935	22 October 2008	Welwyn Hatfield	1987, 1992
Terry Fields	Labour	8 March 1937	28 June 2008	Liverpool Broadgreen	1983, 1987
Tim Fortescue	Conservative	28 August 1916	29 September 2008	Liverpool Garston	1966, 1970
John Gunnell	Labour	1 October 1933	28 January 2008	Morley and Leeds South Morley and Rothwell	1992 1997
John Harvey	Conservative	4 April 1920	13 January 2008	Walthamstow East	1955, 1959, 1964
Philip Hocking	Conservative	27 October 1925	17 August 2008	Coventry South	1959
Norman Hogg, Baron Hogg of Cumbernauld	Labour	12 March 1938	8 October 2008	East Dunbartonshire Cumbernauld and Kilsyth	1979 1983, 1987, 1992
Sir Ralph Howell	Conservative	25 May 1923	14 February 2008	North Norfolk	1970, 1974 I & II, 1979, 1983, 1987, 1992
Sir Anthony Kershaw	Conservative	14 December 1915	29 April 2008	Stroud	1955, 1959, 1964, 1966, 1970, 1974 I & II, 1979, 1983
Dickson Mabon	Social Democratic (Labour from 1955 to 1981)	1 November 1925	10 April 2008	Greenock Greenock and Port Glasgow	1955, 1959, 1964, 1966, 1970 1974 I & II, 1979
John MacDougall (in office)	Labour	8 December 1947	13 August 2008	Central Fife Glenrothes	2001 2005
Patrick Maitland, 17th Earl of Lauderdale	Unionist	17 March 1911	2 December 2008	Lanark	1951, 1955
Ray Michie, Baroness Michie of Gallanach	Liberal Democrats	4 February 1934	6 May 2008	Argyll and Bute	1987, 1992, 1997
Sir John Page	Conservative	16 September 1919	31 October 2008	Harrow West	1960 (by-election), 1964, 1966, 1970, 1974 I & II, 1979, 1983
Francis Pym, Baron Pym	Conservative	13 February 1922	7 March 2008	Cambridgeshire South East Cambridgeshire	1961 (by-election), 1964, 1966, 1970, 1974 I, II, 1979 1983
Peter Rees, Baron Rees	Conservative	9 December 1926	30 November 2008	Dover	1970, 1974 I, II, 1979, 1983
Andrew Rowe	Conservative	11 September 1935	21 November 2008	Mid Kent Faversham and Mid Kent	1983, 1987, 1992 1997
Russell Johnston, Baron Russell-Johnston	Liberal	28 July 1932	27 July 2008	Inverness Inverness, Nairn and Lochaber	1964, 1966, 1970, 1974 I & II, 1979 1983, 1987 1992
Jock Stallard, Baron Stallard	Labour	5 November 1921	29 March 2008	St Pancras North	1970, 1974 I & II, 1979
Peter Thomas, Baron Thomas of Gwydir	Conservative	31 July 1920	4 February 2008	Conway Hendon South	1951, 1955, 1959, 1964 1970, 1974 I, II, 1979, 1983
George Thomson, Baron Thomson of Monifieth	Labour	16 January 1921	3 October 2008	Dundee East	1952 (by-election), 1955, 1959, 1964, 1966, 1970
Peter Thurnham	Liberal Democrats (Conservative from 1983 to 1996, Independent in 1996)	21 August 1938	10 May 2008	Bolton North East	1983, 1987, 1992
Eric Varley, Baron Varley	Labour	11 August 1932	29 July 2008	Chesterfield	1964, 1966, 1970, 1974 I, II, 1979, 1983
Paul Williams	Conservative	14 November 1922	10 September 2008	Sunderland South	1953 (by-election), 1955, 1959

== 2009 ==
Individual	Party	Born	Died	Constituency(ies) represented	Election(s) won
Peter Blaker, Baron Blaker	Conservative	4 October 1922	5 July 2009	Blackpool South	1964, 1966, 1970, 1974 I, II, 1979, 1983, 1987
Tim Brinton	Conservative	24 December 1929	24 March 2009	Gravesend Gravesham	1979 1983
Paul Dean, Baron Dean of Harptree	Conservative	14 September 1924	1 April 2009	North Somerset Woodspring	1964, 1966, 1970, 1974 I, II, 1979 1983, 1987
Sir Clement Freud	Liberal	24 April 1924	15 April 2009	Isle of Ely North East Cambridgeshire	1973 (by-election), 1974 I, II, 1979 1983
Richard Reader Harris	Conservative	4 June 1913	7 July 2009	Heston and Isleworth	1950, 1951, 1955, 1959, 1964, 1966
Bert Hazell	Labour	18 April 1907	11 January 2009	North Norfolk	1964, 1966
John Hughes	Labour	29 May 1925	14 August 2009	Coventry North East	1987
David Kerr	Labour	25 March 1923	12 January 2009	Wandsworth Central	1964, 1966
John McWilliam	Labour	16 May 1941	14 November 2009	Blaydon	1979, 1983, 1987, 1992, 1997, 2001
Piers Merchant	Conservative	2 January 1951	21 September 2009	Newcastle upon Tyne Central Beckenham	1983 1992, 1997
Ernest Millington	Labour (Common Wealth from 1945 to 1946)	15 February 1916	9 May 2009	Chelmsford	1945 (by-election), 1945
Oscar Murton, Baron Murton of Lindisfarne	Conservative	8 May 1914	5 July 2009	Poole	1964, 1966, 1970, 1974 I & II
Francis Noel-Baker	Labour	7 January 1920	25 September 2009	Brentford and Chiswick Swindon	1945 1955, 1959, 1964, 1966
Colin Phipps	Labour	23 July 1934	10 January 2009	Dudley West	1974 I & II
John Ryman	Labour	7 November 1930	3 May 2009	Blyth Valley	1974 II, 1979, 1983
David Taylor (in office)	Labour	22 August 1946	26 December 2009	North West Leicestershire	1997, 2001, 2005
Michael Ward	Labour	7 April 1931	25 March 2009	Peterborough	1974 II
James White	Labour	10 April 1922	19 February 2009	Glasgow Pollok	1970, 1974 I & II, 1979, 1983

== See also ==
- List of United Kingdom MPs who died in the 1990s
- List of United Kingdom MPs who died in the 2010s
- List of United Kingdom MPs who died in the 2020s
