= Lord Carlisle =

Lord Carlisle may refer to:

- Earl of Carlisle, a title that has been created three times in the Peerage of England
- Mark Carlisle, Baron Carlisle of Bucklow (1929–2005), British Conservative politician, Secretary of State for Education and Science

== See also ==
- Alex Carlile, Baron Carlile of Berriew (born 1948), British barrister
