= 1916 Widnes by-election =

UK Parliamentary by-election

The 1916 Widnes by-election was held on 22 May 1916. The by-election was held due to the incumbent Conservative MP, William Walker resigning to permit him to donate his entire thoroughbred racing stock to create a National Stud in an arm's-length transaction. He was returned unopposed at the by-election.
