= Xtraordinary People =

Xtraordinary People is a charity in the United Kingdom.

== Founding ==
Founded by Kate Griggs in 2004, the group aims to increase public understanding of dyslexia and to reduce stigma, and campaigns for improved training for teachers to support children with dyslexia.

== Politics ==
In the 2005 general election, Kate Griggs stood for the Xtraordinary People Party against Ruth Kelly in Bolton West to raise awareness of dyslexia and her charity, receiving 74 votes, 0.2% of the total.
