= Minister for International Security Strategy =

- Incumbent; None since 14 July 2014
- Appointer: Prime Minister
- Formation: 5 October 2008
- First holder: The Lady Taylor

The Minister for International Security Strategy was a British government position. The last holder of the post was Andrew Murrison, Conservative Parliamentary Under-Secretary of State at the Ministry of Defence,

The post was a junior ministerial position within the Ministry of Defence. It ceased to exist in 2014.

== Minister for International Defence and Security ==
Name	Portrait	Term of office		Political party	Prime Minister
Parliamentary Under-Secretary of State for International Defence and Security
Ann Taylor, Baroness Taylor of Bolton		5 October 2008	11 May 2010	Labour	Brown
Parliamentary Under-Secretary of State for International Security Strategy
Gerald Howarth		9 June 2010	4 September 2012	Conservative	Cameron
Andrew Murrison		4 September 2012	14 July 2014	Conservative	Cameron
