= Christopher Shawcross =

British lawyer and politician

Christopher Nyholm Shawcross QC
- Born: 20 June 1905
- Died: 18 August 1973 (aged 68); Haywards Heath, Sussex, England
- Education: Dulwich College
- Alma mater: University College, Oxford
- Occupations: Lawyer & politician
- Spouse(s): Doreen Burrows (m. 1931; div. 1949) Maridel Chance (m. 1949)
- Children: 2
- Parents: John Shawcross (father); Hilda Constance Asser (mother)
- Relatives: Hartley Shawcross (brother)
- Military career
- Allegiance: United Kingdom
- Branch: Royal Navy
- Service years: 1939-45
- Rank: Commander
- Unit: Royal Navy Volunteer Reserve
- Conflicts: World War II

Christopher Nyholm Shawcross, QC (20 June 1905 – 18 August 1973) was a British lawyer and Labour politician.

He was the younger son of John Shawcross and Hilda Constance Asser. He was educated at Dulwich College and University College, Oxford, before going on to study law at Gray's Inn.

He was called to the bar in 1931 and practised at the Common Law Bar in London and in the Midland Circuit. With the outbreak of the Second World War, Shawcross joined the Royal Navy Volunteer Reserve, where he reached the rank of Commander.

At the 1945 general election he was returned as Labour MP for Widnes. He was a Europhile parliamentarian, serving on the Parliamentary Committee on the Channel Tunnel, the all party group for European Union, and the British Council of the European Movement. He retired from politics in 1950, becoming Recorder of Nottingham.

He became a King's Counsel in 1949, and pursued a distinguished legal career. In particular he worked in new areas of law, producing books on motor insurance and air law. he retired from the Bar in 1961, but returned to practice in the South Eastern Circuit in 1969.

Christopher Shawcross married twice. His 1931 marriage to Doreen Burrows was dissolved in 1949, and he married Maridel Chance in the same year and they had two children. He was the younger brother of Hartley Shawcross, also a distinguished lawyer and Labour politician.

He died at his home in Haywards Heath, Sussex, aged 68.

Parliament of the United Kingdom
Preceded by Richard Pilkington	Member of Parliament for Widnes; 1945–1950	Succeeded by James MacColl
