= Richard Pilkington (politician, born 1908) =

British soldier and Conservative politician (1908–1976)

Sir Richard Pilkington KBE MC
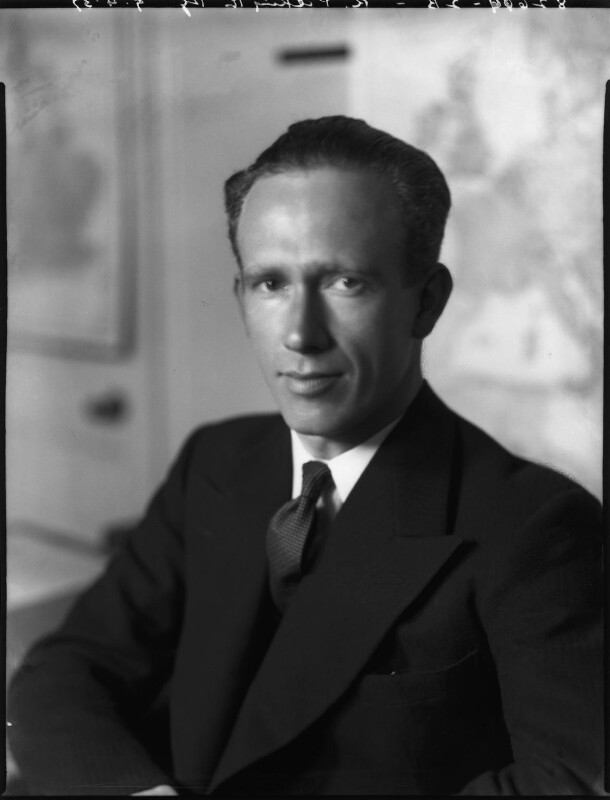

Member of Parliament for Widnes
- In office 14 November 1935 – 15 June 1945
- Preceded by: Roland Robinson
- Succeeded by: Christopher Nyholm Shawcross

Member of Parliament for Poole
- In office 25 October 1951 – 25 September 1964
- Preceded by: Mervyn Wheatley
- Succeeded by: Oscar Murton

Personal details
- Born: Richard Antony Pilkington; 10 May 1908 St Helens, Lancashire, UK
- Died: 9 December 1976 (aged 68)
- Party: Conservative
- Spouse: Rosemary Kidwell (née Russell-Roberts)
- Children: 3
- Education: Christ Church, Oxford

Sir Richard Antony Pilkington, KBE, MC (10 May 1908 – 9 December 1976) was a British Conservative Party politician and an officer in the British Army.

== Early life ==
He was born in St Helens to the Chairman of the Pilkington glass works, Arthur Pilkington, and Marjorie Cope, daughter of the painter Arthur Stockdale Cope. He was educated at Charterhouse and Christ Church, Oxford. He worked and travelled in North America from 1928 until 1930, when he joined the Coldstream Guards as an officer, serving in Sudan and Egypt.

== Military and political career ==
In 1935 he resigned his commission to enter politics and was elected as Member of Parliament (MP) for Widnes in Lancashire. He served as Parliamentary Private Secretary to Oliver Stanley. On the outbreak of the Second World War he rejoined the Army and travelled to France with the British Expeditionary Force. He was awarded the Military Cross after returning with one of the last groups from Dunkirk in 1940.

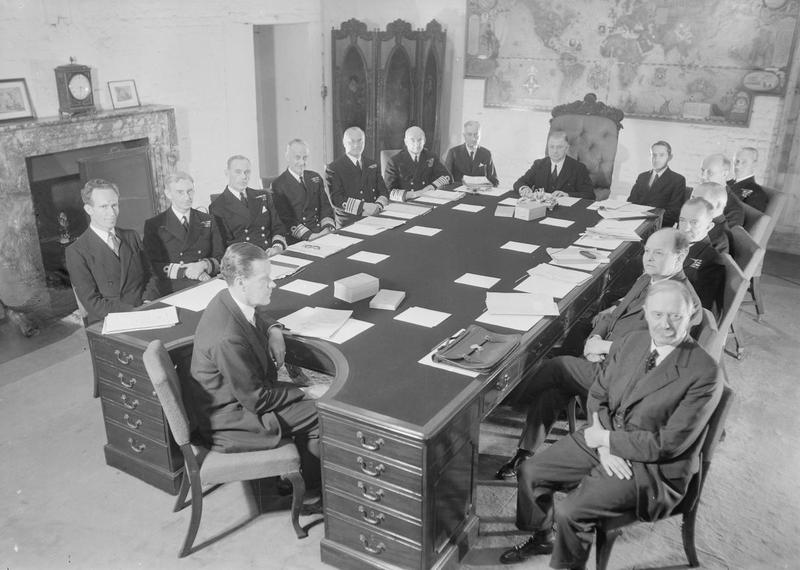
The Board of the Admiralty meets - 16 July 1943. RAP is seated front left.

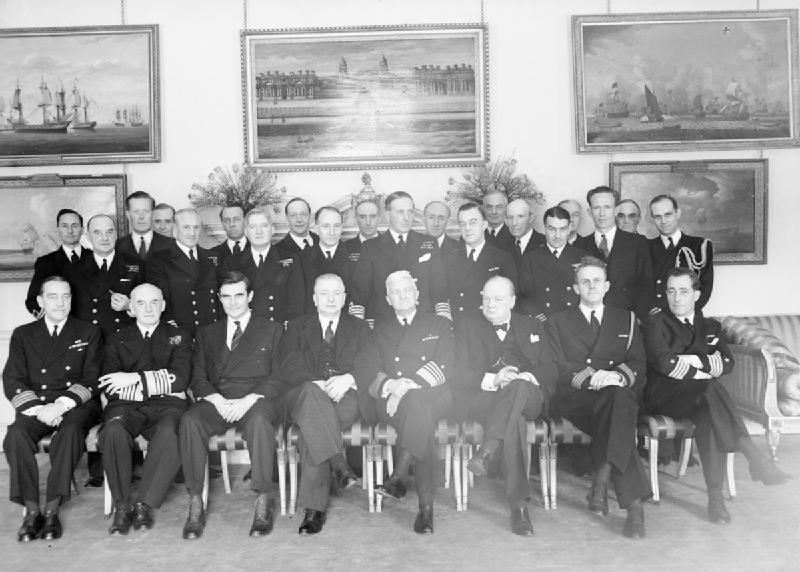
US officials visit the Admiralty 1942-3. Richard Pilkington (pictured standing on the right) was a Civil Lord of the Admiralty.

He left the Army again in 1942 and became a Civil Lord of the Admiralty, leading naval missions to India, Ceylon and Burma. He lost his seat to Christopher Shawcross in 1945 and lost again in 1950. In 1951 he won election as Member of Parliament for Poole in Dorset, a seat he held until his retirement from politics in 1964 after a car accident and the onset of Parkinson's disease. He died from the disease in 1976 at the age of 68.

== Personal life ==
Richard Pilkington was also known for his collection of cars, all red, a passion shared by his nephew Sir Antony Pilkington.

Parliament of the United Kingdom
Preceded by Roland Robinson	Member of Parliament for Widnes; 1935–1945	Succeeded by Christopher Nyholm Shawcross
Preceded by Mervyn Wheatley	Member of Parliament for Poole; 1951–1964	Succeeded by Oscar Murton
Political offices
Preceded by Sir Austin Hudson, Bt	Civil Lord of the Admiralty; 1942–1945	Succeeded by Stoker Edwards
