= James MacColl =

British politician (1908–1971)

Member of Parliament for Widnes
- In office 1950–1971

Mayor of Paddington
- In office 1947–1949

Personal details
- Born: 27 June 1908
- Died: 17 June 1971 (aged 62)
- Party: Labour
- Education: Balliol College, Oxford; University of Chicago

James Eugene MacColl (27 June 1908 – 17 June 1971) was a British Labour Party politician.

== Biography ==
He was the younger son of Hugo MacColl, a master marine engineer. At the age of 12 he was orphaned. MacColl was educated at Sedbergh School and Balliol College, Oxford. At Oxford he became secretary of the University Labour club. He graduated with degrees in philosophy, politics and economics.

Following his graduation he received a Commonwealth Fund fellowship and spent two years at University of Chicago in the United States. He was called to the bar at the Inner Temple in 1933, and practiced on the North East Circuit.

He subsequently moved to Paddington, London, and became a member of the borough council. He was mayor of Paddington in 1947 - 1949. His interest in education led to him being co-opted on to the London County Council education committee from 1936 to 1946. He was appointed a justice of the peace in 1938, and was chairman of the North London Juvenile Court from 1949 to 1964 and of the Camden Juvenile Court from 1964 to his death. MacColl believed in the importance of local government and co-authored two books on the subject.

At the 1950 general election he was elected Member of Parliament for Widnes, and held the seat for two decades until his death in 1971 aged 62. From 1964 to 1969, he was Parliamentary Secretary to the Minister for Housing and Local Government.

MacColl was an active "High Anglican" member of the Church of England, and was a member of the church's Board for Social Responsibility. He was unmarried.

Parliament of the United Kingdom
Preceded by Christopher Shawcross	Member of Parliament for Widnes; 1950–1971	Succeeded by Gordon Oakes
