= Ann Taylor, Baroness Taylor of Bolton =

British politician (born 1947)

The Right Honourable The Baroness Taylor of Bolton PC
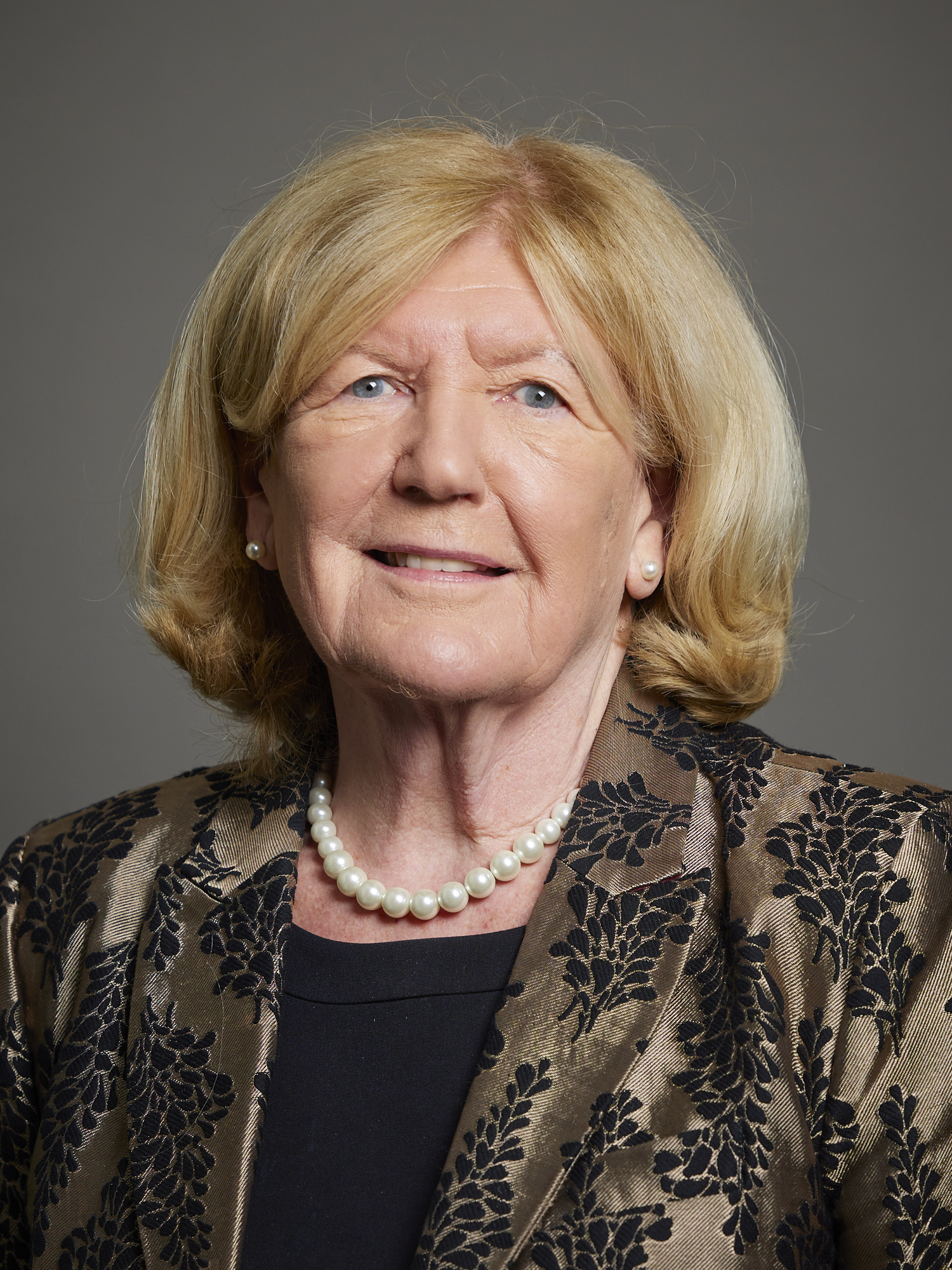
- Official portrait, 2024

Chief Whip of the House of Commons Parliamentary Secretary to the Treasury
- In office 27 July 1998 – 8 June 2001
- Prime Minister: Tony Blair
- Deputy: Keith Bradley
- Preceded by: Nick Brown
- Succeeded by: Hilary Armstrong

Leader of the House of Commons Lord President of the Council
- In office 2 May 1997 – 27 July 1998
- Prime Minister: Tony Blair
- Preceded by: Tony Newton
- Succeeded by: Margaret Beckett
Junior ministerial offices
Minister of State for International Defence and Security
In office 5 October 2008 – 11 May 2010
Prime Minister	Gordon Brown
Preceded by	Office established
Succeeded by	Gerald Howarth
Parliamentary Under-Secretary of State for Defence Equipment and Support
In office 7 November 2007 – 5 October 2008
Prime Minister	Gordon Brown
Preceded by	The Lord Drayson
Succeeded by	Quentin Davies
Parliamentary offices
Chair of the Intelligence and Security Committee
In office 9 June 2001 – 11 April 2005
Prime Minister	Tony Blair
Preceded by	Tom King
Succeeded by	Paul Murphy
Member of the House of Lords
Lord Temporal
Life peerage 13 June 2005
Member of Parliament for Dewsbury
In office 11 June 1987 – 11 April 2005
Preceded by	John Whitfield
Succeeded by	Shahid Malik
Member of Parliament for Bolton West
In office 10 October 1974 – 13 May 1983
Preceded by	Robert Redmond
Succeeded by	Tom Sackville

Shadow cabinet portfolios
- 1994–1997: Shadow Leader of the House of Commons
- 1994–1995: Shadow Chancellor of the Duchy of Lancaster, Shadow Minister for the Citizen's Charter
- 1992–1994: Shadow Secretary of State for Education

Personal details
- Born: Winifred Ann Taylor; 2 July 1947 (age 79) London, England
- Party: Labour
- Education: University of Bradford (BSc)

Winifred Ann Taylor, Baroness Taylor of Bolton, PC (born 2 July 1947) is a British politician and life peer who served in the Cabinet of the United Kingdom from 1997 to 2001. A member of the Labour Party, she was Member of Parliament (MP) for Bolton West from 1974 to 1983, and Dewsbury from 1987 to 2005.

== Early life and education ==
Winifred Ann Taylor (nee Walker) was born on 2 July 1947 in Motherwell, Scotland. Her mother, Doreen Bowling, was born in Lancashire and her father and grandfather hailed from Motherwell, Scotland. Her father was a Post Office engineer and Labour Party councillor in Bolton, and her grandfather served as chairman of Motherwell Labour Party.

After moving to her mother's hometown of Bolton at a young age, Taylor was educated at Bolton School, where she was head girl. She studied at the University of Bradford, where she graduated with a BSc in Politics and History in 1969.

== Political career ==
Taylor contested the marginal Bolton West constituency at the February 1974 general election, but lost to incumbent Conservative Robert Redmond by a majority of 603 votes. However, she was elected to represent the same constituency in October 1974, defeating Redmond with a majority of 903.

During her first term in Parliament, she served in the Callaghan government as an assistant whip from 1977 to 1979. Notably the first female whip in the UK Parliament, she was later depicted in the 2012 play This House.

Re-elected at the 1979 general election with a reduced majority of 600 votes, she unsuccessfully contested the new Bolton North East seat in 1983, defeated by Conservative Peter Thurnham. Taylor returned to Parliament upon her election to the Dewsbury constituency at the 1987 general election, representing the seat until her retirement in 2005.

When she returned to the House of Commons in 1987, Taylor became a shadow minister under Labour leader Neil Kinnock; covering education and science from 1979 to 1981 and the environment from 1981 to 1992. She then served in the Shadow Cabinets of John Smith and Tony Blair as Shadow Secretary of State for Education from 1992 to 1994, Shadow Chancellor of the Duchy of Lancaster from 1994 to 1995 and Shadow Leader of the House of Commons from 1994 to 1997.

In the first Blair ministry, Taylor became the first woman to serve as Leader of the House of Commons and Lord President of the Privy Council in 1997. After a 1998 cabinet reshuffle, she went on to become the first woman to serve as Government Chief Whip (Parliamentary Secretary to the Treasury).

As a backbencher, Taylor served as chair of the Intelligence and Security Committee from 2001 to 2005. Her appointment to this post was criticised by opposition Liberal Democrats. She also sponsored a Private Member's Bill, the 'Succession to the Crown (no 2)' Bill, which sought to eliminate gender and religious discrimination in the royal succession.

On 13 May 2005 it was announced that Taylor was to be given a life peerage, and she was created Baroness Taylor of Bolton, of Bolton in the County of Greater Manchester, on 13 June 2005. She was made Minister for Defence Procurement on 7 November 2007, following Lord Drayson's decision to resign to compete in the American Le Mans Series; unlike her predecessor, she was paid. Following the Brown reshuffle of October 2008, she was moved to a new post at both the Ministry of Defence and the Foreign and Commonwealth Office as Minister for International Defence and Security.

In September 2022 she became a member of the House of Lords Appointments Commission, filling the quota for the Labour Party.

In January 2024 she became Chair of the Industry and Regulators Committee, where she had been a member since 2022.

Parliament of the United Kingdom
Preceded by Robert Redmond	Member of Parliament for Bolton West; 1974–1983	Succeeded by Tom Sackville
Preceded by John Whitfield	Member of Parliament for Dewsbury; 1987–2005	Succeeded by Shahid Malik
Political offices
Preceded by Jack Straw	Shadow Secretary of State for Education; 1992–1994	Succeeded by David Blunkett
Preceded by Michael Meacher	Shadow Chancellor of the Duchy of Lancaster; 1994–1995	Succeeded by Derek Foster
Preceded by Michael Meacher	Shadow Minister for the Citizen's Charter; 1994–1995	Succeeded by Derek Foster
Preceded by Margaret Beckett	Shadow Leader of the House of Commons; 1994–1997	Succeeded by Alastair Goodlad
Preceded by Tony Newton	Leader of the House of Commons; 1997–1998	Succeeded by Margaret Beckett
Preceded by Tony Newton	Lord President of the Council; 1997–1998	Succeeded by Margaret Beckett
Preceded by Nick Brown	Government Chief Whip in the Commons; 1998–2001	Succeeded by Hilary Armstrong
Preceded by Nick Brown	Parliamentary Secretary to the Treasury; 1998–2001	Succeeded by Hilary Armstrong
Preceded by Tom King	Chair of the Intelligence and Security Committee; 2001–2005	Succeeded by Paul Murphy
Preceded by The Lord Drayson	Minister of State for Defence Equipment and Support; 2007–2008	Succeeded by Quentin Davies
New office	Minister of State for International Defence and Security; 2008–2010	Succeeded by Gerald Howarth as Minister of State for International Security Strategy
Party political offices
Preceded by Nick Brown	Chief Whip of the Labour Party in the Commons; 1998–2001	Succeeded by Hilary Armstrong
