= Arthur Holt (politician) =

British politician (1914-1995)

President of the Liberal Party
- In office 1974–1975
- Leader: Jeremy Thorpe
- Preceded by: Rhys Lloyd
- Succeeded by: Margaret Wingfield

Liberal Chief Whip
- In office May 1962 – 1963
- Leader: Jo Grimond
- Preceded by: Donald Wade
- Succeeded by: Eric Lubbock

Member of Parliament for Bolton West
- In office 25 October 1951 – 25 September 1964
- Preceded by: John Lewis
- Succeeded by: Gordon Oakes

Personal details
- Born: 8 August 1914 Bolton, Lancashire
- Died: 23 August 1995 (aged 81)
- Party: Liberal Party
- Spouse: Kathleen Openshaw (m. 1939)
- Children: 2
- Education: Mill Hill School
- Alma mater: Victoria University of Manchester
- Military career
- Allegiance: United Kingdom
- Branch: British Army
- Service years: 1938–1945
- Unit: Loyal Regiment
- Commands: Reconnaissance Corps
- Conflicts: World War II; Battle of Singapore

Arthur Frederick Holt (8 August 1914 – 23 August 1995) was a hosiery manufacturer and Liberal Party politician in the United Kingdom, and Member of Parliament for thirteen years.

== Background ==
Holt was born in Bolton. He was educated at Mill Hill School and Victoria University of Manchester. In 1939 he married Kathleen Mary Openshaw, MBE. They had one son and one daughter. He played Rugby for Bolton RUFC.

== Professional career ==
Holt joined the Loyal Regiment as a Territorial Army officer in 1938 and left the Territorial Army Reserve of Officers in 1964. He was company commander in the Reconnaissance Corps and was taken prisoner at the fall of Singapore in 1942. He was twice mentioned in dispatches.

Holt was a hosiery manufacturer. With his two brothers he built up in Bolton an industry new to the town. He was Chairman, Holt Hosiery Co. Ltd, Bolton, 1971–73.

== Political career ==
Holt was first elected at the 1951 general election, when he defeated the only other candidate in the Bolton West constituency, sitting Labour MP John Lewis. Holt was re-elected in straight contests with Labour at two further general elections. He was Parliamentary Chairman of the Liberal Party from 1952 to 1955. He was a Member of the Parliamentary delegation to Russia in 1954. He was Liberal Chief Whip from 1962 to 1963. His share of the vote was halved when the Conservative Party fielded a candidate at the 1964 general elections, and the seat was won by Labour's Gordon Oakes. He was President of the Liberal Party from 1974 to 1975.

=== Electoral record ===
General election 1950: Bolton East
Party	Candidate	Votes	%	±%
Labour	Alfred Booth	24,826	45.48	n/a
Conservative	Philip Bell	21,117	38.68	n/a
Liberal	Arthur Holt	8,647	15.84	n/a
Majority		3,709	6.79	n/a
Turnout		54,590	87.46	n/a
Labour win (new seat)				

General election 1951: Bolton West
Party	Candidate	Votes	%	±%
Liberal	Arthur Holt	26,271	52.76	+32.30
Labour	John Lewis	23,523	47.24	+2.62
Majority		2,748	5.52	−
Turnout		49,794	84.79	−2.76
Liberal gain from Labour		Swing	+17.46	

General election 1955: Bolton West
Party	Candidate	Votes	%	±%
Liberal	Arthur Holt	24,827	55.37	+2.61
Labour	James Haworth	20,014	44.63	−2.61
Majority		4,813	10.73	+5.22
Turnout		44,841	79.05	− 5.74
Liberal hold		Swing	+2.61	

General election 1959: Bolton West
Party	Candidate	Votes	%	±%
Liberal	Arthur Holt	23,533	54.63	−0.74
Labour	Peter Cameron	19,545	45.37	+0.74
Majority		3,988	9.26	−1.48
Turnout		43,078	79.72	+0.65
Liberal hold		Swing	-0.74	

General election 1964: Bolton West
Party	Candidate	Votes	%	±%
Labour	Gordon Oakes	16,519	41.17	−4.20
Conservative	Douglas Sisson	13,522	33.70	+ 33.70
Liberal	Arthur Holt	10,086	25.14	− 29.49
Majority		2,997	7.47	
Turnout		38,346	78.15	−1.67
Labour gain from Liberal		Swing	-18.95	

Parliament of the United Kingdom
Preceded by John Lewis	Member of Parliament for Bolton West; 1951–1964	Succeeded by Gordon Oakes
Party political offices
Preceded by Donald Wade	Liberal Chief Whip; 1962–1963	Succeeded by Eric Lubbock
Preceded by Rhys Lloyd	President of the Liberal Party; 1974–1975	Succeeded by Margaret Wingfield
