= Derek Twigg =

British Labour politician (born 1959)

Derek Twigg MP
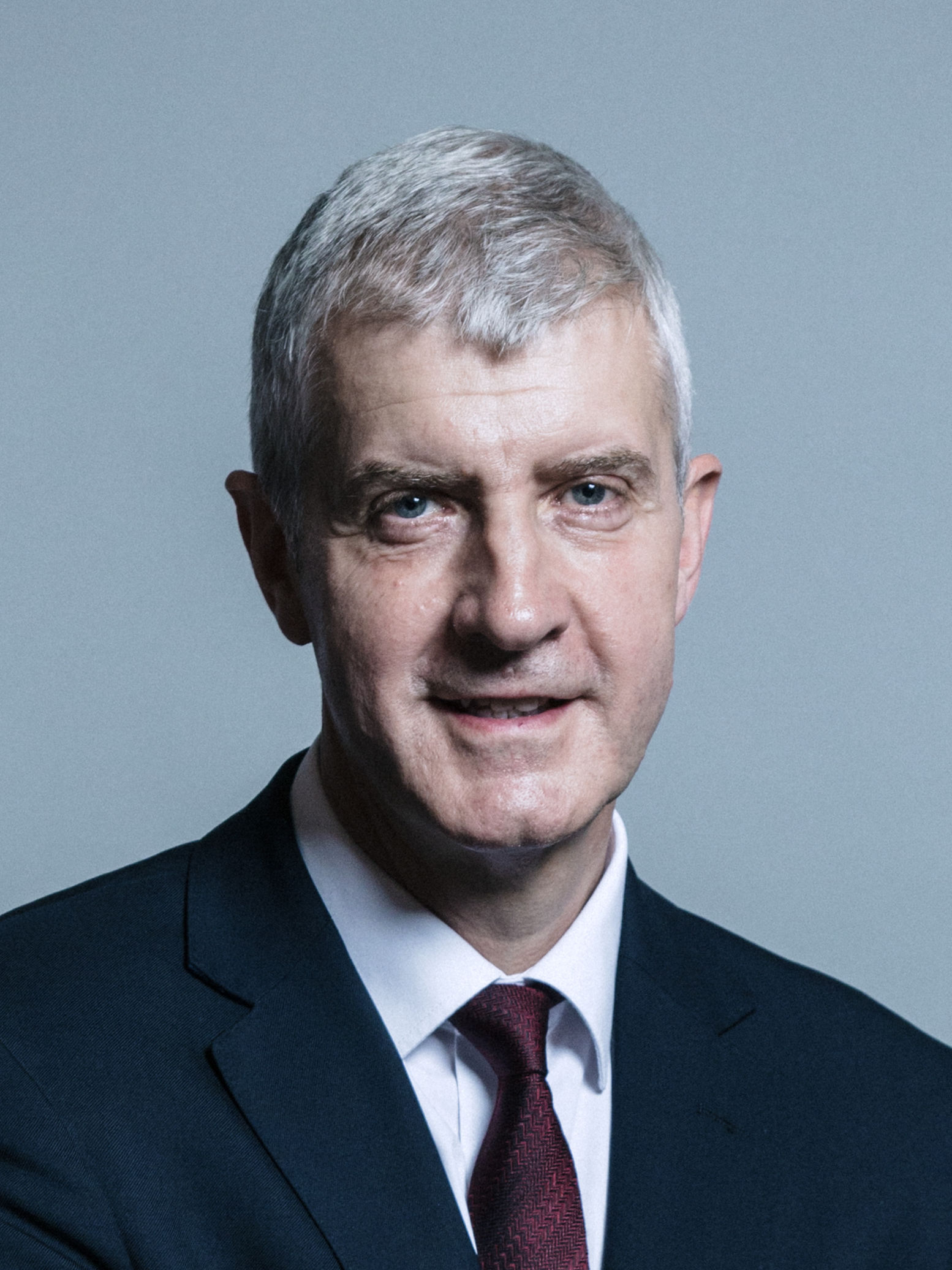
- Official portrait, 2017

Parliamentary Under-Secretary of State for Veterans
- In office 6 September 2006 – 5 October 2008
- Prime Minister: Tony Blair; Gordon Brown
- Preceded by: Tom Watson
- Succeeded by: Kevan Jones

Parliamentary Under-Secretary of State for Transport
- In office 5 May 2005 – 6 September 2006
- Prime Minister: Tony Blair
- Preceded by: David Jamieson
- Succeeded by: Tom Harris

Parliamentary Under-Secretary of State of Schools
- In office 16 December 2004 – 5 May 2005
- Prime Minister: Tony Blair
- Preceded by: Stephen Twigg
- Succeeded by: The Lord Adonis

Lord Commissioner of the Treasury
- In office 13 June 2003 – 16 December 2004
- Prime Minister: Tony Blair
- Preceded by: Phil Woolas
- Succeeded by: Gillian Merron

Member of Parliament for Widnes and Halewood Halton (1997–2024)
- Incumbent
- Assumed office 1 May 1997
- Preceded by: Gordon Oakes
- Majority: 16,425 (43.1%)

Personal details
- Born: 9 July 1959 (age 67) Widnes, Lancashire, England
- Party: Labour
- Website: derektwigg.org

John Derek Twigg (born 9 July 1959) is a British Labour Party politician who currently serves as the Member of Parliament (MP) for Widnes and Halewood since 2024, and for its predecessor constituency, Halton, from the 1997 general election until its abolition in 2024.

== Early life ==
Twigg was born in Widnes, Lancashire and attended Bankfield High School in Widnes, and afterwards Halton College of Further Education (now Riverside College). At the age of 16, he joined the Civil Service and worked for the Department for Employment (at Runcorn) for the following 19 years.

At 18, Twigg became branch secretary of the Civil and Public Services Association (now part of the Public and Commercial Services Union) before joining the Labour Party in 1979. He was elected to Cheshire County Council at the age of 21, serving as a county councillor until 1985. In 1983 he was elected to Halton Borough Council. Between 1996 and 1997, he also worked as a political consultant.

== Parliamentary career ==
At the general election in 1997, Twigg succeeded Gordon Oakes as Member of Parliament for the constituency of Halton. He made his maiden speech in the House of Commons on 10 June 1997. He was appointed Parliamentary Private Secretary to Helen Liddell, and then to Stephen Byers, before serving as a Government Whip from June 2002 until 2004.

In December 2004, Twigg was appointed Parliamentary Under-Secretary of State at the Department for Education and Skills. On 1 May 2005, he was booed and jeered while defending school league tables at the annual National Association of Head Teachers conference. After the general election of May 2005, he became Under-Secretary of State in the Department for Transport.

In September 2006, Twigg was appointed Under-Secretary of State and Minister for Veterans at the Ministry of Defence. In October 2008, he was replaced in this position and, declining the offer of another ministerial post, returned to the back benches.

In 2013, he was one of 22 Labour MPs to vote against the Marriage (Same Sex Couples) Bill, which eventually passed with cross-party support.

== Personal life ==
Twigg married Mary Cassidy in January 1988 in Widnes. He has a son and a daughter. Twigg's wife died on 26 November 2019; this led to him stepping away from his general election campaign and allowing his constituency party to run it on his behalf.

Twigg's interests outside politics include hill walking, military history (particularly World War II) and rugby league. A lifelong Liverpool FC supporter, Twigg attended the 1989 FA Cup semi-final tie between Liverpool and Nottingham Forest at the Hillsborough stadium, and watched the unfolding Hillsborough disaster from the north stand.

Parliament of the United Kingdom
Preceded by Gordon Oakes	Member of Parliament for Halton; 1997–2024	Constituency abolished
New constituency	Member of Parliament for Widnes and Halewood; 2024–present	Incumbent
