= Dennis Vosper, Baron Runcorn =

British Conservative politician

The Right Honourable The Lord Runcorn TD PC

Minister of Health
- In office 1957–1957
- Prime Minister: Harold Macmillan
- Preceded by: Robin Turton
- Succeeded by: Derek Walker-Smith

Member of Parliament for Runcorn
- In office 23 February 1950 – 31 March 1964
- Preceded by: New Constituency
- Succeeded by: Mark Carlisle

Member of the House of Lords; Lord Temporal
- In office 20 April 1964 – 20 January 1968

Personal details
- Born: 2 January 1916
- Died: 20 January 1968 (aged 52)
- Party: Conservative

Dennis Forwood Vosper, Baron Runcorn TD PC (2 January 1916 – 20 January 1968) was a British Conservative Party politician.

Educated at The Leas, Hoylake, Marlborough College and at Pembroke College, Cambridge, he first worked with Wilson, Vosper & Coltart, Ships Store & Export Merchants, in Liverpool. He was commissioned into the Cheshire Regiment (Territorial Army) in April 1939 and served until the 1950s, reaching the rank of Major.

He was elected as the Member of Parliament (MP) for Runcorn, Cheshire in 1950, holding the seat until 1964.

He held office as Conservative Whip, 1950–1954; as a Lord Commissioner of the Treasury, 1951–1954; Parliamentary Secretary to the Ministry of Education, October 1954 – January 1957; Minister of Health, 1957, from which he resigned owing to illness in September 1957. He was Leader of the Parliamentary Delegation to West Indies, 1958. He returned to ministerial office as Joint Parliamentary Under-Secretary of State for the Home Department, 1959–1960, as Minister of State for Home Affairs, 1960–1961; and as Secretary for Technical Co-operation, 1961–1963.

He was appointed a Privy Counsellor in 1957 and was created a life peer on 20 April 1964 as Baron Runcorn, of Heswall in the County Palatine of Chester.

He died in January 1968 aged 52.

== Arms ==
Coat of arms of Dennis Vosper, Baron Runcorn
Coronet Coronet of a Baron Crest Out of a Tower triple-towered Or, a Stag's Head proper, attired Or, in the mouth a Hatchet, the haft Gold, the blade proper. Escutcheon Per chevron Azure and Gules, on a Chevron between in chief two Garbs and in base a Porcullis chained Or, a Cross-Moline Sable. Supporters On either side a Beaver proper, gorged with a Collar Or, attached thereto a line reflexed over the back Gules. Motto DILIGENCE AND SERVICE

Parliament of the United Kingdom
New office	Member of Parliament for Runcorn; 1950–1964	Succeeded by Mark Carlisle
Political offices
Preceded by Robin Turton	Minister of Health; 1957–1957	Succeeded by Derek Walker-Smith
