= John Lewis (British politician) =

British politician (1912-1969)

John Lewis (14 December 1912 – 14 June 1969) was a British Labour Party politician, who played a major part in the controversial arrest of society osteopath Stephen Ward, landlord of Christine Keeler in the Profumo affair of 1963.

== Career ==
After making a fortune in industrial rubber, Lewis was elected as Member of Parliament (MP) for the two-seat constituency of Bolton at the 1945 general election, and became Parliamentary Private Secretary to the Postmaster-General. The constituency was divided in a boundary review for the 1950 general election, when he was returned as MP for the new Bolton West constituency. At the 1951 general election he lost his seat to the Liberal candidate Arthur Holt.

== Privilege hearing ==
In July 1951, Lewis reported to the House of Commons Committee of Privileges to respond to charges that he tried to use Parliamentary privilege to escape charges that he drove into a policeman on his way to Parliament. Statements from witnesses said the MP, who was late for a division hit the traffic officer three times. The committee concluded that privilege for an MP was not "above the ordinary restraints of law which apply to fellow citizens. They do not discharge the member from obligations to society, which apply to him as much and perhaps more closely in that capacity as they apply to other subjects of The Crown."

== Role in Profumo scandal ==
Lewis had borne a deep grudge against society osteopath Stephen Ward (Christine Keeler's landlord), ever since Ward had introduced one of Lewis's girlfriends to a lesbian contact, who lured her away from him. On Christmas Eve 1962, Keeler was feeling angry about some small issue with Ward, and visited a Baker Street nightclub, just for someone to talk to. By the purest chance, she met Lewis, and poured out the whole story of Profumo and the Soviet diplomat Ivanov. Lewis was overjoyed at this opportunity to get Ward named as a national security risk, and also twist the facts to make it look as though he was living off immoral earnings. In partnership with George Wigg, who had a score to settle with Profumo, Lewis made frequent allegations to the police about Ward's activities, until they arrested him. When Ward committed suicide in mid-trial, Lewis celebrated with champagne.

Parliament of the United Kingdom
Preceded by Sir Edward Cadogan; Sir Cyril Entwistle	Member of Parliament for Bolton; 1945–1950; With: Jack Jones	Constituency abolished
New constituency	Member of Parliament for Bolton West; 1950–1951	Succeeded by Arthur Holt
