= Widnes and Halewood =

UK Parliament constituency (since 2024)

- County constituency for the House of Commons
- Interactive map of boundaries since 2024
- Location within North West England
- County: Cheshire and Merseyside
- Electorate: 70,865 (March 2020)
- Major settlements: Widnes and Halewood

Current constituency
- Created: 2024
- Member of Parliament: Derek Twigg (Labour)
- Seats: One
- Created from: Halton, Garston and Halewood & St Helens South and Whiston

Widnes and Halewood is a constituency of the House of Commons in the UK Parliament. Further to the completion of the 2023 review of Westminster constituencies, it was first contested at the 2024 general election. The Member of Parliament elected in 2024 is Derek Twigg of the Labour Party, who was formerly MP for the predecessor seat of Halton from 1997 to 2024.

== Boundaries ==
Mersey Gateway Bridge, which joins Widnes with Runcorn across the River Mersey.

The constituency crosses the boundary of the ceremonial counties of Cheshire and Merseyside. Further to the 2023 boundary review, the composition of the constituency is as follows from the 2024 general election (as they existed on 1 December 2020):

- The Borough of Halton wards of: Appleton; Bankfield; Birchfield; Central & West Bank; Ditton, Hale Village & Halebank; Farnworth; Halton View; Highfield; Hough Green.
- The Metropolitan Borough of Knowsley wards of: Halewood North; Halewood South; Whiston & Cronton (polling districts WC1, WC1A, WC2, WC3 and WC4).

The seat covers the following areas:

- The majority of the abolished constituency of Halton, comprising the town of Widnes and surrounding areas to the north of the River Mersey
- Halewood from the Garston and Halewood constituency (abolished)
- The majority of the Whiston and Cronton ward - excluding the town centre of Whiston - from the St Helens South and Whiston constituency

== Members of Parliament ==
Election	Member	Party
2024	Derek Twigg	Labour

== Elections ==
=== Elections in the 2020s ===
General election 2024: Widnes and Halewood
Party	Candidate	Votes	%	±%
Labour	Derek Twigg	23,484	61.6	−4.9
Reform	Jake Fraser	7,059	18.5	+10.9
Conservative	Sean Houlston	3,507	9.2	−11.6
Green	Nancy Mills	2,058	5.4	+3.1
Liberal Democrats	David Coveney	1,593	4.2	+1.4
Workers Party	Michael Murphy	415	1.1	N/A
Majority		16,425	43.1	−2.5
Turnout		38,116	54.5	−13.1
Registered electors		70,161		
Labour hold		Swing	+7.9	
