= Oscar Murton, Baron Murton of Lindisfarne =

British Conservative Party politician (1914–2009)

The Right Honourable The Lord Murton of Lindisfarne OBE TD PC
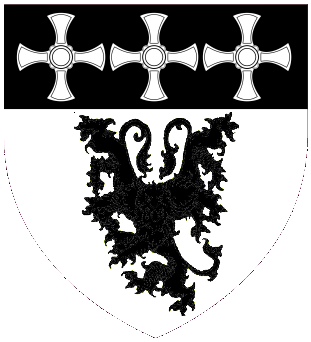

Deputy Speaker of the House of Commons Chairman of Ways and Means
- In office 3 February 1976 – 10 May 1979
- Monarch: Elizabeth II
- Speaker: George Thomas
- Preceded by: George Thomas
- Succeeded by: Bernard Weatherill

First Deputy Chairman of Ways and Means
- In office 12 March 1974 – 3 February 1976
- Speaker: Selwyn Lloyd
- Preceded by: Lance Mallalieu
- Succeeded by: Myer Galpern

Second Deputy Chairman of Ways and Means
- In office 30 October 1973 – 12 March 1974
- Speaker: Selwyn Lloyd
- Preceded by: Lance Mallalieu
- Succeeded by: Myer Galpern

Member of the House of Lords
- Lord Temporal
- Life peerage 25 July 1979 – 5 July 2009

Member of Parliament for Poole
- In office 15 October 1964 – 7 April 1979
- Preceded by: Richard Pilkington
- Succeeded by: John Ward

Personal details
- Born: 8 May 1914 Newcastle-upon-Tyne, Northumberland, England
- Died: 5 July 2009 (aged 95)
- Party: Conservative
- Education: Uppingham School

Henry Oscar Murton, Baron Murton of Lindisfarne OBE TD PC (8 May 1914 – 5 July 2009) was a British Conservative Party politician.

== Early life and career ==
Murton was born in Newcastle-upon-Tyne and educated at Uppingham School. He joined the Territorial Army with a commission in the Northumberland Fusiliers in 1934. He was promoted to Lieutenant in 1937 and to Captain in 1939. He was a Lieutenant-Colonel in the General Staff from 1942 to 1946. He later became a managing director of department stores.

== Political career ==
Murton was Member of Parliament for Poole from 1964 to 1979, preceding John Ward.

He was a government whip under Edward Heath and later a Deputy Speaker of the House of Commons from 1973 to 1979.

Murton was appointed as a Privy Counsellor in 1976, and after his retirement from the House of Commons at the 1979 general election, he was given a life peerage as Baron Murton of Lindisfarne, of Hexham in the County of Northumberland on 25 July 1979.

== Death ==
Murton died on 5 July 2009, aged 95.

== Arms ==
Coat of arms of Oscar Murton, Baron Murton of Lindisfarne

Crest
In front of a blackcock drumming Proper three crosses of St Cuthbert Argent.
Escutcheon
Argent a lion tricorporate Sable on a chief Sable three crosses of St Cuthbert Argent.
Supporters
Dexter a lion guardant Sable langued and armed Gules gorged with a circlet of St Cuthbert crosses linked Argent pendent therefrom an escallop Or, sinister a like lion similarly gorged pendent therefrom a portcullis Gold the compartment comprising a grassy mount Proper surrounded by water barry wavy Azure and Argent.
Motto
Quo Eas Voca

== Sources ==
- Times Guide to the House of Commons October 1974
- Leigh Rayment's Peerage Pages
- Leigh Rayment's Historical List of MPs

Parliament of the United Kingdom
| Preceded by Richard Pilkington | Member of Parliament for Poole; 1964–1979 | Succeeded by John Ward |
| Preceded by Lance Mallalieu | Second Deputy Chairman of Ways and Means; 1973 – 1974 | Succeeded by Vacant - post next held by Sir Myer Galpern |
| Preceded by Lance Mallalieu | First Deputy Chairman of Ways and Means; 1974 – 1976 | Succeeded by Sir Myer Galpern |
| Preceded by George Thomas | Chairman of Ways and Means; 1976 – 1979 | Succeeded by Bernard Weatherill |
