= Bolton West =

Parliamentary constituency in the United Kingdom, 1950 onwards

Coordinates: 53.577°N 2.451°W

- County constituency for the House of Commons
- Interactive map of boundaries since 2024
- Location within North West England
- County: Greater Manchester
- Population: 94,523 (2011 census)
- Electorate: 72,125 (March 2020)
- Major settlements: Blackrod, Heaton, Horwich, Westhoughton

Current constituency
- Created: 1950
- Member of Parliament: Phil Brickell (Labour)
- Seats: One
- Created from: Bolton

Bolton West is a constituency (Note: A county constituency (for the purposes of election expenses and type of returning officer)) represented in the House of Commons of the UK Parliament since 2024 by Phil Brickell, a Labour Party politician. (Note: As with all constituencies, the constituency elects one Member of Parliament (MP) by the first past the post system of election at least every five years.)

== Constituency profile ==
The Bolton West constituency located within the Metropolitan Borough of Bolton in Greater Manchester. It includes the western suburbs of the large town of Bolton and the area to its west, including the towns of Westhoughton, Horwich and Blackrod. Like much of Greater Manchester, the area has an industrial heritage in textile manufacturing and coal mining.

Residents of the constituency have similar levels of wealth, education and professional employment compared to national averages. The constituency has a similar ethnic makeup to the country as a whole; 83% of residents are White and 12% are Asian (mostly Indian) with the Asian population concentrated in Bolton. Local politics are mixed, with Conservative and Liberal Democrat councillors representing most of the Bolton suburbs, Labour Party councillors representing Daubhill and parts of Westhoughton and independents representing Horwich and Blackrod. An estimated 55% of voters in the constituency supported leaving the European Union in the 2016 referendum, slightly higher than the national figure of 52%.

== History ==
The constituency was created for the 1950 general election when the two-member seat of Bolton was split between the single member seats of Bolton East and Bolton West. The Labour Party candidate won in 1950 but, at the next three elections, the Conservative Party did not stand, allowing Arthur Holt of the Liberal Party to hold the seat from 1951 to 1964. Subsequently, it has been a marginal seat (Note: As it has most often given marginal majorities of less than 10%) between Labour and Conservative, although at the 2019 election, it was also the safest Conservative seat in Greater Manchester, with a larger majority than Altrincham and Sale West. This was overturned when the seat was won by Labour in the 2024 election.

== Boundaries ==
=== Historic ===
Bolton West in Lancashire, boundaries used 1974–83

1950–1983: The County Borough of Bolton wards of Deane-cum-Lostock, Derby, Halliwell, Heaton, Rumworth, Smithills, and West.

1983–1997: The Borough of Bolton wards of Blackrod, Deane-cum-Heaton, Halliwell, Horwich, Hulton Park, Smithills, and Westhoughton.

1997–2010: The Borough of Bolton wards of Blackrod, Deane-cum-Heaton, Horwich, Hulton Park, Smithills, and Westhoughton.

2010–2024: The Borough of Bolton wards of Heaton and Lostock, Horwich and Blackrod, Horwich North East, Smithills, Westhoughton North and Chew Moor, and Westhoughton South, and the Borough of Wigan ward of Atherton.

There were major boundary changes to Bolton West in 1983 when part of its area went to create Bolton North East, but compensated by taking most of the former Westhoughton constituency. 2010 saw the town of Atherton added from the Wigan borough, previously in the Leigh constituency.

=== Current ===
Further to the 2023 review of Westminster constituencies which became effective for the 2024 general election, the constituency was defined as comprising the following wards of the Metropolitan Borough of Bolton as they existed on 1 December 2020:

- Heaton and Lostock; Horwich and Blackrod; Horwich North East; Hulton; Smithills; Westhoughton North and Chew Moor; Westhoughton South.

The Wigan Borough ward of Atherton was transferred back out, to the new constituency of Leigh and Atherton, offset by the addition of Hulton ward from Bolton South East (abolished).

Following a local government boundary review which came into effect in May 2023, the constituency now comprises the following wards of the Metropolitan Borough of Bolton from the 2024 general election:

- Heaton, Lostock & Chew Moor; Horwich North; Horwich South & Blackrod; Hulton (nearly all); Smithills (nearly all); Westhoughton North & Hunger Hill; Westhoughton South; and a very small part of Rumworth.

== Members of Parliament ==
Election	Member	Party
1950	John Lewis	Labour
1951	Arthur Holt	Liberal
1964	Gordon Oakes	Labour
1970	Robert Redmond	Conservative
October 1974	Ann Taylor	Labour
1983	Tom Sackville	Conservative
1997	Ruth Kelly	Labour
2010	Julie Hilling	Labour
2015	Chris Green	Conservative
2024	Phil Brickell	Labour

== Elections ==
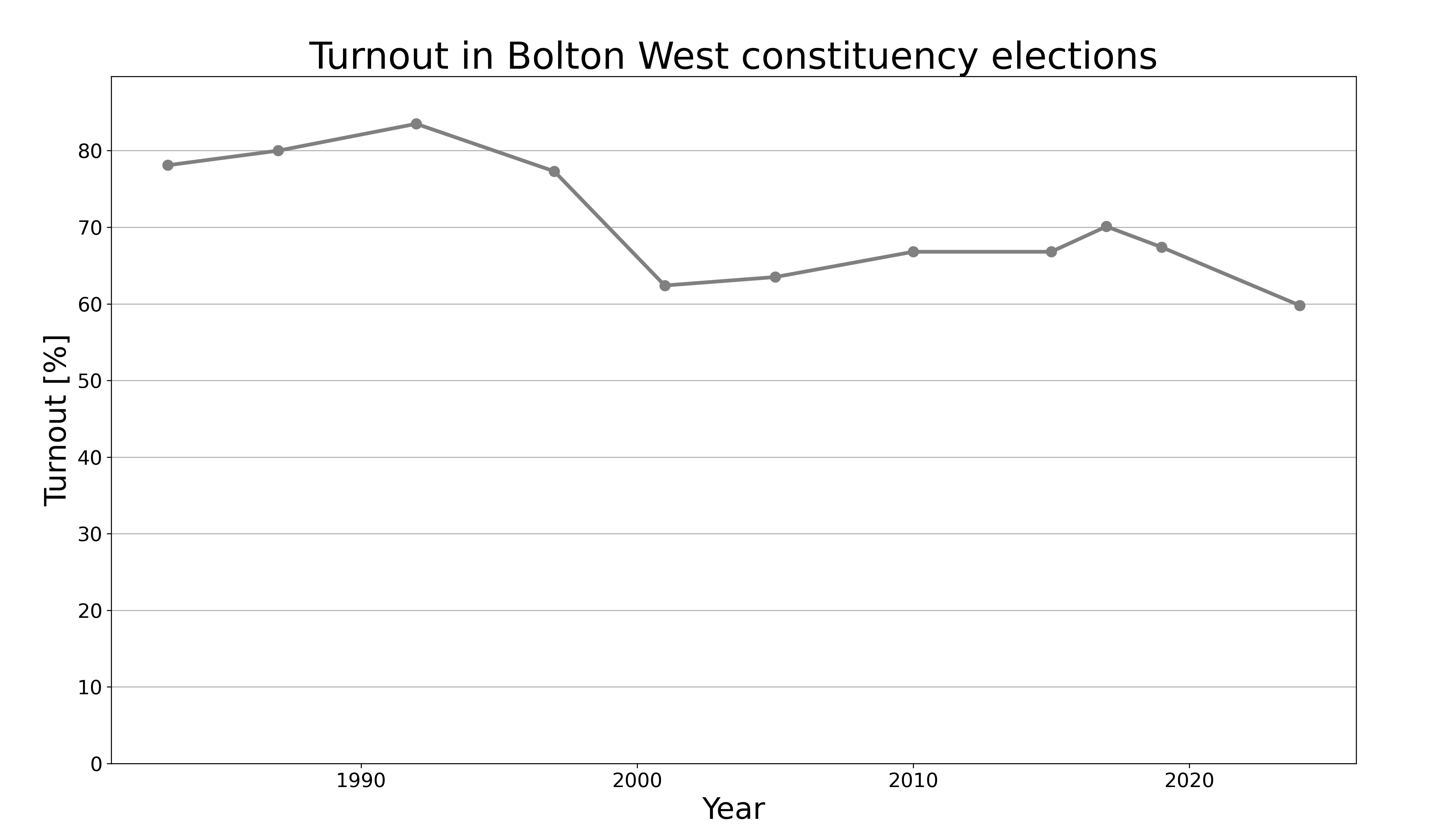
Bolton West election turnout

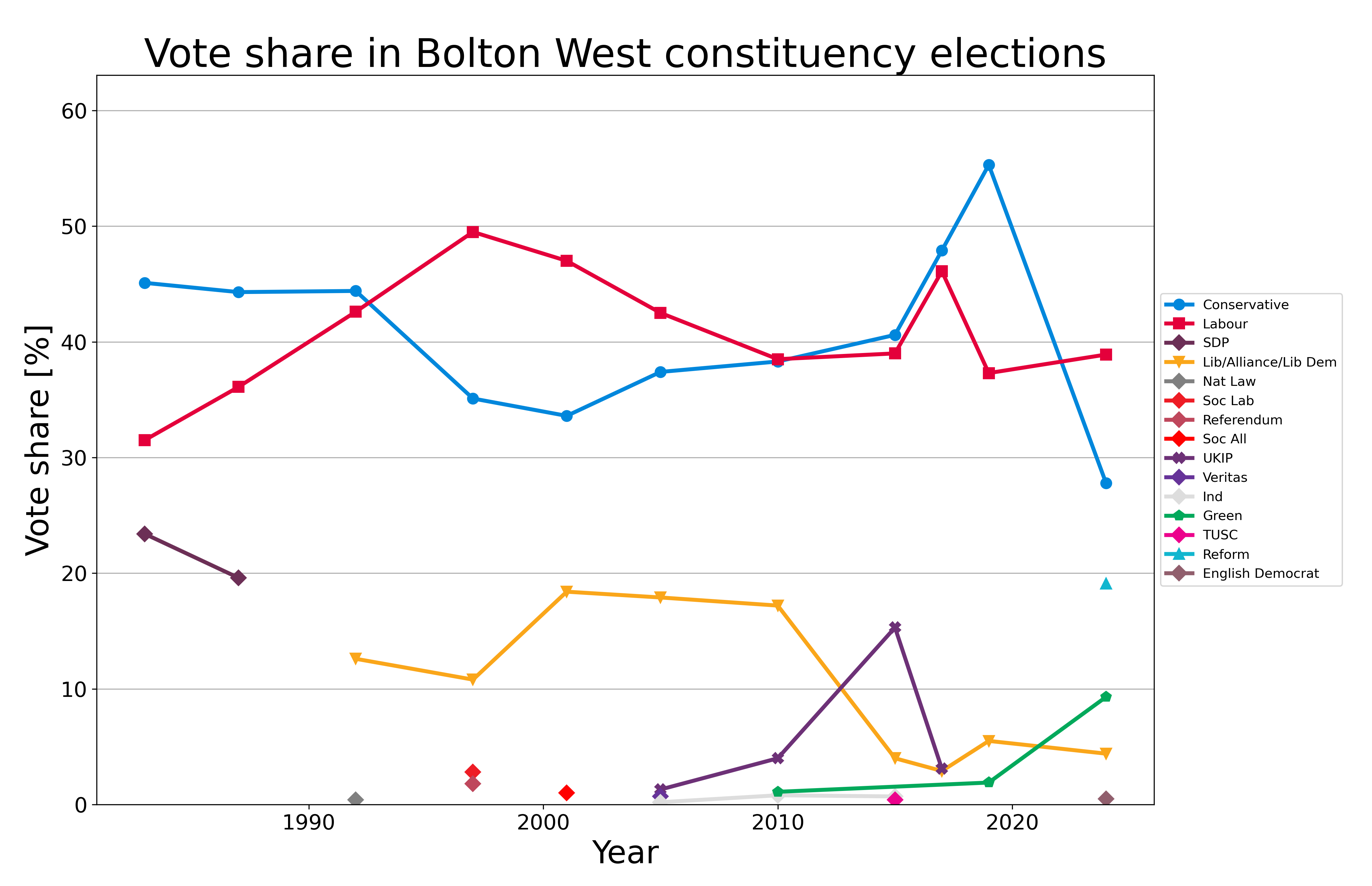
Bolton West election results

=== Elections in the 2020s ===
General election 2024: Bolton West
Party	Candidate	Votes	%	±%
Labour	Phil Brickell	17,363	38.9	+3.7
Conservative	Chris Green	12,418	27.8	–28.7
Reform	Dylan Evans	8,517	19.1	+18.3
Green	Vicki Attenborough	4,132	9.3	+7.5
Liberal Democrats	Donald McIntosh	1,966	4.4	–1.2
English Democrat	Patrick McGrath	202	0.5	N/A
Majority		4,945	11.1	–6.9
Turnout		44,598	59.5	–7.9
Registered electors		74,933		
Labour gain from Conservative		Swing	+14.5	

=== Elections in the 2010s ===
2019 notional result
Party	Vote	%
Conservative	28,197	56.5
Labour	17,578	35.2
Liberal Democrats	2,815	5.6
Green	893	1.8
Brexit Party	385	0.8
Turnout	49,868	69.1
Electorate	72,125	

General election 2019: Bolton West
Party	Candidate	Votes	%	±%
Conservative	Chris Green	27,255	55.3	+7.4
Labour	Julie Hilling	18,400	37.3	–8.8
Liberal Democrats	Rebecca Forrest	2,704	5.5	+2.6
Green	Paris Hayes	939	1.9	N/A
Majority		8,855	18.0	+16.2
Turnout		49,298	67.4	–2.7
Conservative hold		Swing	+8.1	

General election 2017: Bolton West
Party	Candidate	Votes	%	±%
Conservative	Chris Green	24,459	47.9	+7.3
Labour	Julie Hilling	23,523	46.1	+7.1
UKIP	Martin Tighe	1,587	3.1	–12.2
Liberal Democrats	Becky Forrest	1,485	2.9	–1.1
Majority		936	1.8	+0.2
Turnout		51,054	70.1	+3.3
Conservative hold		Swing	+0.1	

General election 2015: Bolton West
Party	Candidate	Votes	%	±%
Conservative	Chris Green	19,744	40.6	+2.3
Labour	Julie Hilling	18,943	39.0	+0.5
UKIP	Bob Horsefield	7,428	15.3	+11.3
Liberal Democrats	Andrew Martin	1,947	4.0	–13.2
Independent	Andy Smith	321	0.7	N/A
TUSC	John Vickers	209	0.4	N/A
Majority		801	1.6	N/A
Turnout		48,592	66.8	0.0
Conservative gain from Labour		Swing	+0.9	

General election 2010: Bolton West
Party	Candidate	Votes	%	±%
Labour	Julie Hilling	18,327	38.5	–6.8
Conservative	Susan Williams	18,235	38.3	+5.9
Liberal Democrats	Jackie Pearcey	8,177	17.2	–1.8
UKIP	Harry Lamb	1,901	4.0	+2.6
Green	Rachel Mann	545	1.1	N/A
Independent	Jimmy Jones	254	0.5	N/A
You Party	Doug Bagnall	137	0.3	N/A
Majority		92	0.2	–4.9
Turnout		47,576	66.8	+3.3
Labour hold		Swing	–5.9	

=== Elections in the 2000s ===
General election 2005: Bolton West
Party	Candidate	Votes	%	±%
Labour	Ruth Kelly	17,239	42.5	–4.5
Conservative	Philip Allott	15,175	37.4	+3.8
Liberal Democrats	Tim Perkins	7,241	17.9	–0.5
UKIP	Marjorie Ford	524	1.3	N/A
Veritas	Michael Ford	290	0.7	N/A
Xtraordinary People	Kate Griggs	74	0.2	N/A
Majority		2,064	5.1	–8.3
Turnout		40,543	63.5	+1.1
Labour hold		Swing	–4.2	

General election 2001: Bolton West
Party	Candidate	Votes	%	±%
Labour	Ruth Kelly	19,381	47.0	–2.5
Conservative	James Stevens	13,863	33.6	–1.5
Liberal Democrats	Barbara Ronson	7,573	18.4	+7.6
Socialist Alliance	David Toomer	397	1.0	N/A
Majority		5,518	13.4	–1.0
Turnout		41,214	62.4	–14.9
Labour hold		Swing	–0.5	

=== Elections in the 1990s ===
General election 1997: Bolton West
Party	Candidate	Votes	%	±%
Labour	Ruth Kelly	24,342	49.5	+10.4
Conservative	Tom Sackville	17,270	35.1	–12.2
Liberal Democrats	Barbara Ronson	5,309	10.8	–2.4
Socialist Labour	Doris Kelly	1,374	2.80	N/A
Referendum	Glenda Frankl-Slater	865	1.76	N/A
Majority		7,072	14.4	N/A
Turnout		49,160	77.3	–6.2
Labour gain from Conservative		Swing	+11.3	

General election 1992: Bolton West
Party	Candidate	Votes	%	±%
Conservative	Tom Sackville	26,452	44.4	+0.1
Labour	Clifford Morris	25,373	42.6	+6.5
Liberal Democrats	Barbara Ronson	7,529	12.6	–7.0
Natural Law	Jacqueline Phillips	240	0.4	N/A
Majority		1,079	1.8	–6.4
Turnout		59,594	83.5	+3.5
Conservative hold		Swing	–3.2	

=== Elections in the 1980s ===
General election 1987: Bolton West
Party	Candidate	Votes	%	±%
Conservative	Tom Sackville	24,779	44.3	–0.8
Labour Co-op	Guy Harkin	20,186	36.1	+4.6
SDP	David Eccles	10,936	19.6	–4.9
Majority		4,593	8.2	–5.4
Turnout		55,901	80.0	+1.9
Conservative hold		Swing	–2.7	

General election 1983: Bolton West
Party	Candidate	Votes	%	±%
Conservative	Tom Sackville	23,731	45.1	+1.8
Labour	Dennis Green	16,579	31.5	−11.8
SDP	Ron Baker	12,321	23.4	N/A
Majority		7,152	13.6	N/A
Turnout		52,631	78.1	−1.2
Conservative gain from Labour				

=== Elections in the 1970s ===
General election 1979: Bolton West
Party	Candidate	Votes	%	±%
Labour	Ann Taylor	17,857	44.81	+1.55
Conservative	B. H. Watson	17,257	43.30	+2.35
Liberal	J. Fish	4,392	11.02	−2.05
National Front	K. Bernal	348	0.87	−1.85
Majority		600	1.51	−0.80
Turnout		39,854	79.36	+2.12
Labour hold				

General election October 1974: Bolton West
Party	Candidate	Votes	%	±%
Labour	Ann Taylor	16,967	43.26	+4.13
Conservative	Robert Redmond	16,061	40.95	+0.34
Liberal	Philip Stefan Linney	5,127	13.07	−7.19
National Front	W. Roberts	1,070	2.73	N/A
Majority		906	2.31	N/A
Turnout		39,305	77.24	
Labour gain from Conservative				

General election February 1974: Bolton West
Party	Candidate	Votes	%	±%
Conservative	Robert Redmond	16,562	40.61	−11.06
Labour	Ann Taylor	15,959	39.13	−9.20
Liberal	Philip Stefan Linney	8,264	20.26	N/A
Majority		603	1.48	−1.86
Turnout		40,685	81.06	+7.07
Conservative hold				

General election 1970: Bolton West
Party	Candidate	Votes	%	±%
Conservative	Robert Redmond	19,225	51.67	+13.93
Labour	Gordon Oakes	17,981	48.33	−2.24
Majority		1,244	3.34	N/A
Turnout		37,216	73.99	−4.3
Conservative gain from Labour				

=== Elections in the 1960s ===
General election 1966: Bolton West
Party	Candidate	Votes	%	±%
Labour	Gordon Oakes	19,390	50.57	+9.40
Conservative	Christopher BS Dobson	14,473	37.74	+4.04
Liberal	Robert Glenton	4,483	11.69	−14.45
Majority		4,917	12.82	+5.35
Turnout		40,127	78.29	+0.14
Labour hold				

General election 1964: Bolton West
Party	Candidate	Votes	%	±%
Labour	Gordon Oakes	16,519	41.17	−4.20
Conservative	Douglas Sisson	13,522	33.70	+3.70
Liberal	Arthur Holt	10,086	25.14	−29.49
Majority		2,997	7.47	N/A
Turnout		38,346	78.15	−1.67
Labour gain from Liberal				

=== Elections in the 1950s ===
General election 1959: Bolton West
Party	Candidate	Votes	%	±%
Liberal	Arthur Holt	23,533	54.63	−0.74
Labour	Peter Cameron	19,545	45.37	+0.74
Majority		3,988	9.26	−1.48
Turnout		43,078	79.72	+0.65
Liberal hold				

General election 1955: Bolton West
Party	Candidate	Votes	%	±%
Liberal	Arthur Holt	24,827	55.37	+2.61
Labour	James Haworth	20,014	44.63	−2.61
Majority		4,813	10.74	5.22
Turnout		44,841	79.05	− 5.74
Liberal hold				

General election 1951: Bolton West
Party	Candidate	Votes	%	±%
Liberal	Arthur Holt	26,271	52.76	+32.30
Labour	John Lewis	23,523	47.24	+2.62
Majority		2,748	5.52	N/A
Turnout		49,794	84.79	−2.76
Liberal gain from Labour				

General election 1950: Bolton West
Party	Candidate	Votes	%	±%
Labour	John Lewis	23,232	44.62	
Conservative	Walter Wharton Tong	18,184	34.92	
Liberal	Alan Lever Tillotson	10,653	20.46	
Majority		5,048	9.70	
Turnout		52,069	87.55	
Labour win (new seat)				

== See also ==
- parliamentary constituencies in Greater Manchester
