= Runcorn (constituency) =

Parliamentary constituency in the United Kingdom, 1950–1983

- Former county constituency for the House of Commons
- Boundary of Runcorn in Cheshire, boundaries 1974–1983
- County: Cheshire

1950–1983
- Created from: Bucklow, Eddisbury, Knutsford and Northwich
- Replaced by: Warrington South, Halton, Eddisbury and Tatton

Runcorn was a parliamentary constituency centred on the town of Runcorn in Cheshire. It returned one Member of Parliament (MP) to the House of Commons of the Parliament of the United Kingdom, elected by the first past the post system.

== History ==
Runcorn was created for the 1950 general election from parts of several constituencies.

It was abolished following the reorganisation of local authorities in 1974 by the Third Periodic Review of Westminster constituencies for the 1983 general election, when it was divided primarily between the re-established constituency of Eddisbury and the new constituencies of Halton and Warrington South.

== Boundaries ==
For its entire existence the constituency consisted of the Urban Districts of Runcorn and Lymm, and the Rural District of Runcorn.

The Urban District of Runcorn was transferred from Northwich and Lymm was previously part of the abolished constituency of Bucklow. The Rural District of Runcorn (including Frodsham, Helsby, Grappenhall and Stockton Heath) was previously split between Knutsford, Northwich and the abolished Eddisbury constituency.

From local government boundary changes on 1 April 1974 until the constituency was abolished at the next parliamentary boundary review which came into effect for the 1983 general election, the constituency comprised parts of the expanded Borough of Warrington and the newly formed Borough of Halton, and the District of Vale Royal, but its boundaries were unchanged.

On abolition, the western half of Runcorn was included in the new constituency of Halton along with the town of Widnes (on the northern side of the River Mersey). The eastern half of the town formed part of the Weaver Vale constituency, along with Northwich, Frodsham, Helsby and surrounding areas.

== Members of Parliament ==
Election	Member	Party
1950	Dennis Vosper	Conservative
1964	Mark Carlisle	Conservative
1983	constituency abolished: see Halton & Warrington South	

== Elections ==
=== Elections in the 1950s ===
General election 1950:Runcorn
Party	Candidate	Votes	%	±%
Conservative	Dennis Vosper	22,145	54.04	
Labour	L H Wharrad	14,063	34.32	
Liberal	Harold Griffiths	4,768	11.64	
Majority		8,082	19.72	
Turnout		40,976		
Conservative win (new seat)				

General election 1951: Runcorn
Party	Candidate	Votes	%	±%
Conservative	Dennis Vosper	24,821	62.36	+8.32
Labour	John Hindle	14,980	37.64	+3.32
Majority		9,841	24.72	+5.00
Turnout		39,801		
Conservative hold		Swing	+2.5	

General election 1955: Runcorn
Party	Candidate	Votes	%	±%
Conservative	Dennis Vosper	24,682	64.05	+1.69
Labour	David Barker	13,852	35.95	−1.69
Majority		10,830	28.10	+3.38
Turnout		38,534		
Conservative hold		Swing		

General election 1959: Runcorn
Party	Candidate	Votes	%	±%
Conservative	Dennis Vosper	26,615	65.79	+1.74
Labour	Joel Barnett	13,837	34.21	−1.74
Majority		12,778	31.58	+3.48
Turnout		40,452		
Conservative hold		Swing		

=== Elections in the 1960s ===
General election 1964: Runcorn
Party	Candidate	Votes	%	±%
Conservative	Mark Carlisle	21,586	49.00	−16.79
Labour	Paul Lyall Jackson	14,127	32.07	−2.14
Liberal	Robert Walter Jordan	8,343	18.94	New
Majority		7,459	16.93	−14.65
Turnout		44,056		
Conservative hold		Swing		

General election 1966: Runcorn
Party	Candidate	Votes	%	±%
Conservative	Mark Carlisle	21,472	48.40	−0.60
Labour	Michael J E Taylor	16,290	36.72	+4.65
Liberal	Terence Anthony Maher	6,606	14.89	−4.05
Majority		5,182	11.68	−5.25
Turnout		44,368		
Conservative hold		Swing		

=== Elections in the 1970s ===
General election 1970: Runcorn
Party	Candidate	Votes	%	±%
Conservative	Mark Carlisle	25,272	53.52	+5.12
Labour	Michael J E Taylor	16,204	34.32	−2.40
Liberal	Christopher K Sumner	5,741	12.16	−2.73
Majority		9,068	19.20	+7.44
Turnout		47,217		
Conservative hold		Swing		

General election February 1974: Runcorn
Party	Candidate	Votes	%	±%
Conservative	Mark Carlisle	26,374	45.87	−7.65
Labour	Michael John Ellerington Taylor	19,106	33.23	−1.09
Liberal	Peter Michael Brenton	12,020	20.90	+8.74
Majority		7,268	12.64	−6.56
Turnout		57,500		
Conservative hold		Swing		

General election October 1974: Runcorn
Party	Candidate	Votes	%	±%
Conservative	Mark Carlisle	25,047	46.15	+0.28
Labour	Anthony John Eccles	19,579	36.07	+2.84
Liberal	David Sanders	9,188	16.93	−3.97
Independent	Noel Dobson	464	0.85	New
Majority		5,468	10.08	−2.56
Turnout		54,278	77.62	
Conservative hold		Swing		

General election 1979: Runcorn
Party	Candidate	Votes	%	±%
Conservative	Mark Carlisle	32,907	51.48	+5.33
Labour	George Joseph Maudsley	22,226	34.77	−1.30
Liberal	Richard Charles Kemp	8,783	13.74	−3.19
Majority		10,681	16.71	+6.64
Turnout		63,916	77.83	
Conservative hold		Swing		

== See also ==
- History of parliamentary constituencies and boundaries in Cheshire
