= Widnes (constituency) =

Parliamentary constituency in the United Kingdom, 1885–1983

- Former county constituency for the House of Commons
- Widnes in Lancashire, showing boundaries used from 1974–1983

1885–1983
- Seats: one
- Created from: South West Lancashire
- Replaced by: Halton, Knowsley South and St Helens South

Widnes was a county constituency in England, based on the town of Widnes, in Lancashire. It returned one Member of Parliament (MP) to the House of Commons of the Parliament of the United Kingdom, elected by the first past the post voting system.

== History ==
The constituency was formed as a Parliamentary division of Lancashire in 1885, including Allerton, Cronton, Ditton, Garston, Hale, Halewood, Huyton with Roby, Little Woolton, Much Woolton, Speke, Tarbock, Whiston and Widnes.

In 1918 it was redefined to cover the municipal borough of Widnes, along with the urban districts of Prescot and Huyton with Roby and the Whiston Rural District. The two urban districts and part of the rural district (the parishes of Eccleston, Kirkby, Knowsley, and Windle) became part of a new Huyton constituency in 1950, with Widnes retaining the borough and the remainder of the rural district. In 1971 Widnes featured the last by-election to date to have only a Labour and a Conservative candidate. Its boundaries remained unchanged in 1974. In 1983 Widnes constituency was abolished and replaced by the Halton constituency.

== Boundaries ==
1950–1983: The borough of Widnes, and the rural district of Whiston except the parishes of Eccleston, Kirkby, Knowsley, and Windle.

== Members of Parliament ==
Election	Member	Party
1885	Tom Edwards-Moss	Conservative
1892	John Saunders Gilliat	Conservative
1900	William Walker	Coalition Conservative
1919 by-election	Arthur Henderson	Labour
1922	Christopher Clayton	Conservative
1929	Alexander Gordon Cameron	Labour
1931	Roland Robinson	Conservative
1935	Richard Pilkington	Conservative
1945	Christopher Shawcross	Labour
1950	James MacColl	Labour
1971 by-election	Gordon Oakes	Labour
1983	constituency abolished	

== Election results ==
=== Elections in the 1970s ===
General election 1979: Widnes
Party	Candidate	Votes	%	±%
Labour	Gordon Oakes	32,033	55.2	−4.0
Conservative	B.G. Holder	21,752	37.5	+10.0
Liberal	L.A. Self	4,290	7.4	−5.9
Majority		10,281	17.7	−14.0
Turnout		58,075	74.2	+3.3
Labour hold		Swing	−7.0	

General election October 1974: Widnes
Party	Candidate	Votes	%	±%
Labour	Gordon Oakes	31,532	59.2	−5.9
Conservative	A.H.K. Maynard	14,661	27.5	−7.5
Liberal	A. Turner	7,067	13.3	N/A
Majority		16,871	31.7	+1.6
Turnout		53,260	70.9	−2.8
Labour hold		Swing	+0.8	

General election February 1974: Widnes
Party	Candidate	Votes	%	±%
Labour	Gordon Oakes	35,654	65.1	+7.4
Conservative	A.H.K. Maynard	19,155	35.0	−7.3
Majority		16,499	30.1	+14.8
Turnout		54,809	73.7	+5.0
Labour hold		Swing	+7.4	

1971 Widnes by-election
Party	Candidate	Votes	%	±%
Labour	Gordon Oakes	22,880	69.1	+11.4
Conservative	David Stanley	10,219	30.9	−11.4
Majority		12,661	38.3	+23.0
Turnout		33,099		
Labour hold		Swing	+11.4	

General election 1970: Widnes
Party	Candidate	Votes	%	±%
Labour	James MacColl	28,384	57.7	−3.0
Conservative	Griffith H. Pierce	20,841	42.3	+3.0
Majority		7,543	15.3	−6.1
Turnout		49,225	68.7	−4.1
Labour hold		Swing	−3.0	

=== Elections in the 1960s ===
General election 1966: Widnes
Party	Candidate	Votes	%	±%
Labour	James MacColl	26,613	60.7	+3.9
Conservative	Alan Pickering	17,235	39.3	−3.9
Majority		9,378	21.4	+7.7
Turnout		43,848	72.8	−5.1
Labour hold		Swing	+3.9	

General election 1964: Widnes
Party	Candidate	Votes	%	±%
Labour	James MacColl	24,446	56.8	+4.8
Conservative	Alan Pickering	18,572	43.2	−4.8
Majority		5,874	13.7	+9.8
Turnout		43,018	77.9	−5.5
Labour hold		Swing	+4.8	

=== Elections in the 1950s ===
General election 1959: Widnes
Party	Candidate	Votes	%	±%
Labour	James MacColl	21,218	52.0	+0.1
Conservative	Bruce L. Butcher	19,620	48.0	−0.1
Majority		1,598	3.9	+0.1
Turnout		40,838	83.4	+7.0
Labour hold		Swing	+0.1	

General election 1955: Widnes
Party	Candidate	Votes	%	±%
Labour	James MacColl	19,823	51.9	−2.3
Conservative	Beata Brookes	18,374	48.1	+2.3
Majority		1,449	3.8	−4.6
Turnout		38,197	76.4	−11.1
Labour hold		Swing	−2.3	

General election 1951: Widnes
Party	Candidate	Votes	%	±%
Labour	James MacColl	21,688	54.2	+0.1
Conservative	Francis H. Wilson	18,315	45.8	−0.1
Majority		3,373	8.4	+0.2
Turnout		40,003	87.4	−0.8
Labour hold		Swing	+0.1	

General election 1950: Widnes
Party	Candidate	Votes	%	±%
Labour	James MacColl	21,253	54.1	−4.7
Conservative	Richard Pilkington	18,033	45.9	+4.7
Majority		3,220	8.2	−9.5
Turnout		39,286	88.2	+12.2
Labour hold		Swing	−4.7	

=== Elections in the 1940s ===
General election 1945: Widnes
Party	Candidate	Votes	%	±%
Labour	Christopher Shawcross	41,980	58.8	+14.8
Conservative	Richard Pilkington	29,382	41.2	−14.8
Majority		12,598	17.7	N/A
Turnout		71,362	76.0	−3.7
Labour gain from Conservative		Swing	+14.8	

=== Elections in the 1930s ===
General election 1935: Widnes
Party	Candidate	Votes	%	±%
Conservative	Richard Pilkington	24,457	56.0	−6.1
Labour	Alexander Gordon Cameron	19,187	44.0	+6.1
Majority		5,270	12.1	−12.2
Turnout		43,644	79.7	−7.8
Conservative hold		Swing	−6.1	

General election 1931: Widnes
Party	Candidate	Votes	%	±%
Conservative	Roland Robinson	25,123	62.1	+13.1
Labour	Alexander Gordon Cameron	15,309	37.9	−13.1
Majority		9,814	24.3	N/A
Turnout		40,432	87.5	+2.7
Conservative gain from Labour		Swing	+13.1	

=== Elections in the 1920s ===
General election 1929: Widnes
Party	Candidate	Votes	%	±%
Labour	Alexander Gordon Cameron	19,125	51.0	+4.7
Unionist	Christopher Clayton	18,376	49.0	−4.7
Majority		749	2.0	N/A
Turnout		37,501	84.8	−1.0
Labour gain from Unionist		Swing	+4.7	

General election 1924: Widnes
Party	Candidate	Votes	%	±%
Unionist	Christopher Clayton	15,476	53.7	+6.6
Labour	Joe Cotter	13,326	46.3	+2.1
Majority		2,150	7.4	+4.5
Turnout		28,802	85.8	+2.8
Unionist hold		Swing		

General election 1923: Widnes
Party	Candidate	Votes	%	±%
Unionist	Christopher Clayton	12,808	47.1	−6.1
Labour	Joe Cotter	12,020	44.2	−2.6
Liberal	Harry Trevor Ellis	2,355	8.7	N/A
Majority		788	2.9	−3.5
Turnout		27,183	83.0	−3.8
Unionist hold		Swing	−1.7	

General election 1922: Widnes
Party	Candidate	Votes	%	±%
Unionist	Christopher Clayton	14,679	53.2	−6.4
Labour	Arthur Henderson	12,897	46.8	+6.4
Majority		1,782	6.4	−13.8
Turnout		27,576	86.8	+23.8
Unionist gain from Labour		Swing	−6.4	

=== Elections in the 1910s ===
1919 Widnes by-election
Party		Candidate	Votes	%	±%
	Labour	Arthur Henderson	11,404	52.3	+11.9
C	Unionist	Francis Fisher	10,417	47.7	−11.9
Majority			987	4.6	N/A
Turnout			21,821	71.1	+8.1
	Labour gain from Unionist		Swing	+11.9	
C indicates candidate endorsed by the coalition government.

General election 1918: Widnes
Party		Candidate	Votes	%	±%
C	Unionist	William Walker	11,515	59.6	N/A
	Labour	Tom Williamson	7,821	40.4	N/A
Majority			3,694	19.2	N/A
Turnout			19,336	63.0	N/A
	Unionist hold		Swing	N/A	
C indicates candidate endorsed by the coalition government.

1916 Widnes by-election
Party	Candidate	Votes	%	±%
Unionist	William Walker	Unopposed		
Unionist hold				

General election December 1910: Widnes
Party	Candidate	Votes	%	±%
Conservative	William Walker	Unopposed		
Conservative hold				

General election January 1910: Widnes
Party	Candidate	Votes	%	±%
Conservative	William Walker	5,758	55.2	+0.6
Liberal	Louis Bernacchi	4,666	44.8	−0.6
Majority		1,092	10.4	+1.2
Turnout		10,424	88.5	+5.1
Registered electors		11,780		
Conservative hold		Swing	−1.2	

=== Elections in the 1900s ===
General election 1906: Widnes
Party	Candidate	Votes	%	±%
Conservative	William Walker	5,017	54.6	−15.0
Liberal	John Swinburne	4,165	45.4	+15.0
Majority		852	9.2	−30.0
Turnout		9,182	83.4	+11.7
Registered electors		11,005		
Conservative hold		Swing	−15.0	

General election 1900: Widnes
Party	Candidate	Votes	%	±%
Conservative	William Walker	4,716	69.6	+16.1
Liberal	M. C. Macinerney	2,062	30.4	−16.1
Majority		2,654	39.2	+32.2
Turnout		6,778	71.7	−10.9
Registered electors		9,447		
Conservative hold		Swing	+16.1	

=== Elections in the 1890s ===
General election 1895: Widnes
Party	Candidate	Votes	%	±%
Conservative	John Saunders Gilliat	3,973	53.5	+2.1
Liberal	Henry Wade Deacon	3,456	46.5	−2.1
Majority		517	7.0	+4.2
Turnout		7,429	82.6	−0.9
Registered electors		8,998		
Conservative hold		Swing	+2.1	

General election 1892: Widnes
Party	Candidate	Votes	%	±%
Conservative	John Saunders Gilliat	3,866	51.4	−4.6
Liberal	Henry Wade Deacon	3,661	48.6	+4.6
Majority		205	2.8	−9.2
Turnout		7,527	83.5	+2.7
Registered electors		9,014		
Conservative hold		Swing	−4.6	

=== Elections in the 1880s ===
General election 1886: Widnes
Party	Candidate	Votes	%	±%
Conservative	Tom Edwards-Moss	3,719	56.0	−6.0
Liberal	Augustine Birrell	2,927	44.0	+6.0
Majority		792	12.0	−12.0
Turnout		6,646	80.8	−4.0
Registered electors		8,223		
Conservative hold		Swing	−12.0	

General election 1885: Widnes
Party	Candidate	Votes	%	±%
Conservative	Tom Edwards-Moss	4,327	62.0	N/A
Liberal	Edmund Knowles Muspratt	2,650	38.0	N/A
Majority		1,677	24.0	N/A
Turnout		6,977	84.8	N/A
Registered electors		8,223		
Conservative win (new seat)				

== Sources ==
- Leigh Rayment's Historical List of MPs – Constituencies beginning with "W" (part 3)
