= Robert Redmond =

Robert Spencer Redmond (10 September 1919 – 12 March 2006 ) was a British Conservative Party politician.

Redmond was Member of Parliament for Bolton West from 1970 to 1974. In the second general election of that year, he lost the seat to future Labour minister Ann Taylor.

Parliament of the United Kingdom
Preceded by Gordon Oakes	Member of Parliament for Bolton West; 1970–Oct. 1974	Succeeded by Ann Taylor
