= 1971 Widnes by-election =

UK parliamentary by-election

The 1971 Widnes by-election took place on 23 September, following the death of the Labour MP James MacColl on 17 June of that year, and produced a victory for the incumbent Labour Party.

It remains the most recent by-election in England, Wales or Scotland to be contested by only two candidates.

== Result ==
By-election, 1971: Widnes
Party	Candidate	Votes	%	±%
Labour	Gordon Oakes	22,880	69.1	+11.4
Conservative	David Stanley	10,219	30.9	−11.4
Majority		12,661	38.2	+23.8
Turnout		33,099		
Labour hold		Swing	+11.4	
