= Halton (constituency) =

UK Parliament constituency (1983–2024)

Coordinates: 53.327°N 2.706°W

- Former county constituency for the House of Commons
- Boundary of Halton in Cheshire

- Location of Cheshire within England
- County: Cheshire
- Electorate: 72,668 (2018)
- Major settlements: Runcorn and Widnes

1983–2024
- Seats: One
- Created from: Widnes and Runcorn

Halton was a constituency (Note: A county constituency (for the purposes of election expenses and type of returning officer)) in Cheshire, represented in the House of Commons of the UK Parliament from 1997 until 2024 by Derek Twigg of the Labour Party. (Note: As with all constituencies, the constituency elects one Member of Parliament (MP) by the first past the post system of election at least every five years.)

Further to the completion of the 2023 Periodic Review of Westminster constituencies, the seat has been abolished, with the majority, comprising the areas to the north of the River Mersey (Widnes), being included in the new constituency of Widnes and Halewood, contested at the 2024 general election. This was won by Derek Twigg at the election on 4 July 2024, who is now the MP for the area. Areas to the south of the river (Runcorn) are now included in the new constituency of Runcorn and Helsby.

== Creation ==
Halton was created for the 1983 general election following the major reorganisation of local authorities under the Local Government Act 1972, which came into effect on 1 April 1974. The constituency name refers to the Halton barony and covers the majority of the borough of the same name. It sits on either side of the River Mersey and comprises Widnes, the original town of Runcorn (with a small part of the new town) and Hale village.

The larger, northern part of the constituency comprised the former municipal borough of Widnes and the parish of Hale, which were part of the abolished Widnes constituency. The smaller, southern part comprised the majority of the former urban district of Runcorn (excluding Daresbury and Norton), which had been part of the abolished constituency of Runcorn.

== Boundaries ==
Map of boundaries 2010–2024

1983–1997: The Borough of Halton wards of Appleton, Broadheath, Castlefields, Ditton, Farnworth, Grange, Hale, Halton, Halton Brook, Heath, Hough Green, Kingsway, Mersey, Victoria, and Weston.

1997–2010: The Borough of Halton wards of Appleton, Broadheath, Ditton, Farnworth, Grange, Hale, Halton, Halton Brook, Heath, Hough Green, Kingsway, Mersey, and Riverside.

Eastern part, including Castlefields ward transferred to the new constituency of Weaver Vale.

2010–2024: The Borough of Halton wards of Appleton, Birchfield, Broadheath, Castlefields, Ditton, Farnworth, Grange, Hale, Halton Brook, Halton View, Heath, Hough Green, Kingsway, Mersey, and Riverside.

Castlefields ward transferred back from Weaver Vale.

== Political history ==
Halton is considered a safe seat for the Labour Party. Its most marginal election result, a 12.8% majority, was the earliest in 1983, the year of Margaret Thatcher's first landslide victory. Three elections later that majority had risen to 53.2% of the vote. It has otherwise, to date, proven a statistical safe seat for the Labour Party's incumbent MPs, of which there have thus far been two. The 2015 result made the seat the 22nd safest of Labour's 232 seats by percentage of majority.

Of the two forerunner seats, Widnes was last won by another party in 1935, whilst Runcorn had Conservative representation from its creation in 1950 to 1983, when it was abolished.

== Members of Parliament ==
Election	Member	Party	Notes
1983	Gordon Oakes	Labour	Junior minister 1974–1979. Retired 1997, died 2005
1997	Derek Twigg	Labour	Junior minister 2004–2008

== Elections ==
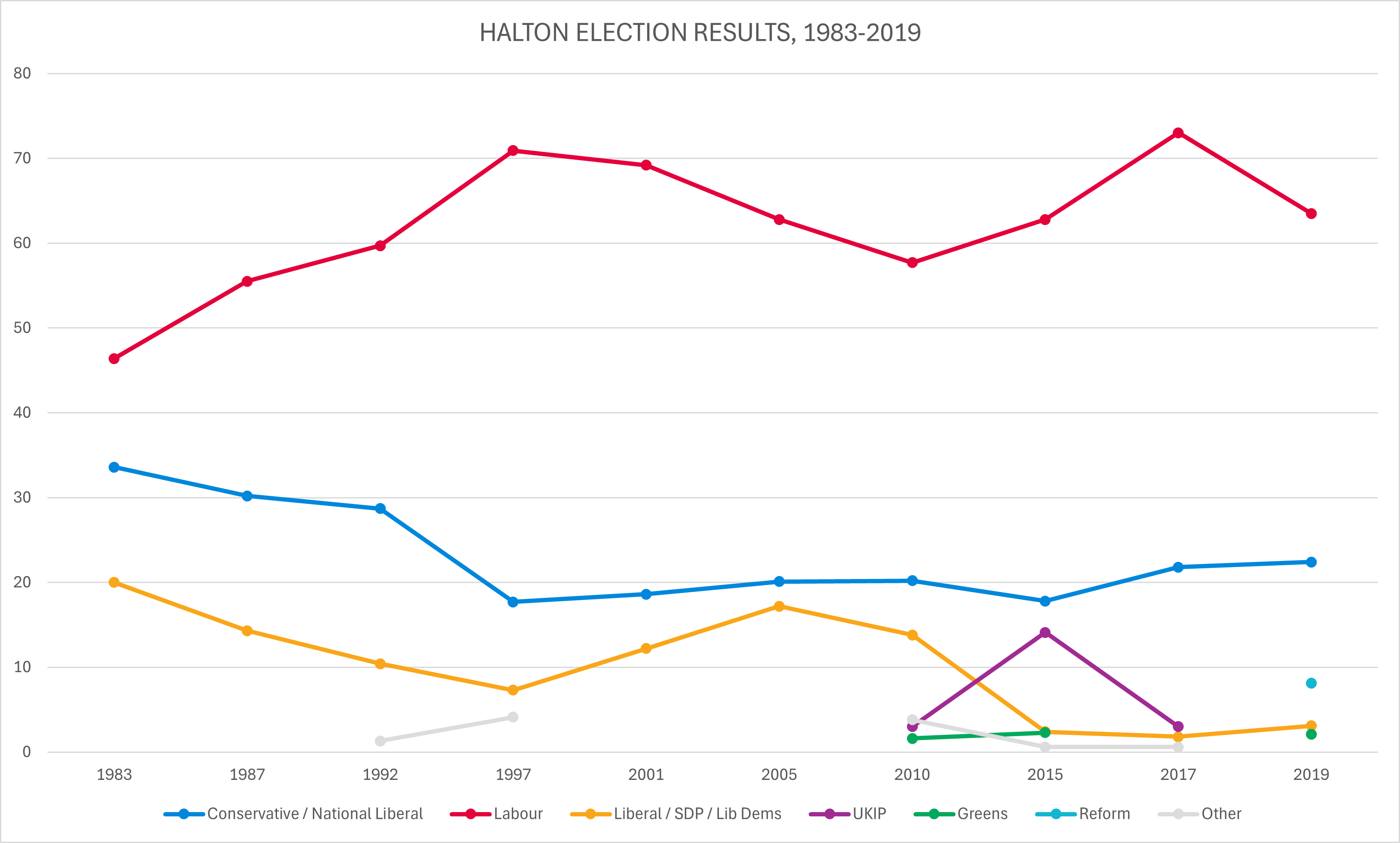
Election results 1983-2019

=== Elections in the 2010s ===
General election 2019: Halton
Party	Candidate	Votes	%	±%
Labour	Derek Twigg	29,333	63.5	−9.5
Conservative	Charles Rowley	10,358	22.4	+0.6
Brexit Party	Janet Balfe	3,730	8.1	New
Liberal Democrats	Stephen Gribbon	1,800	3.1	+1.3
Green	David O'Keefe	982	2.1	New
Majority		18,975	41.1	−10.1
Turnout		46,203	64.2	−3.2
Labour hold		Swing	−5.1	

General election 2017: Halton
Party	Candidate	Votes	%	±%
Labour	Derek Twigg	36,150	73.0	+10.2
Conservative	Matthew Lloyd	10,710	21.8	+4.0
UKIP	Glyn Redican	1,488	3.0	−11.1
Liberal Democrats	Ryan Bate	896	1.8	−0.6
Independent	Vic Turton	309	0.6	±0.0
Majority		25,440	51.2	+6.2
Turnout		49,553	67.4	+5.6
Labour hold		Swing	+3.1	

General election 2015: Halton
Party	Candidate	Votes	%	±%
Labour	Derek Twigg	28,292	62.8	+5.1
Conservative	Matthew Lloyd	8,007	17.8	−2.4
UKIP	Glyn Redican	6,333	14.1	+11.1
Liberal Democrats	Ryan Bate	1,097	2.4	−11.4
Green	David Melvin	1,017	2.3	+0.7
Independent	Vic Turton	277	0.6	New
Majority		20,285	45.0	+7.5
Turnout		45,023	61.8	+1.8
Labour hold		Swing	+3.8	

General election 2010: Halton
Party	Candidate	Votes	%	±%
Labour	Derek Twigg	23,843	57.7	−5.4
Conservative	Ben Jones	8,339	20.2	+0.3
Liberal Democrats	Frank Harasiwka	5,718	13.8	−3.2
BNP	Andrew Taylor	1,563	3.8	New
UKIP	John Moore	1,228	3.0	New
Green	Jim Craig	647	1.6	New
Majority		15,504	37.5	−5.7
Turnout		41,338	60.0	+6.4
Labour hold		Swing	−2.9	

=== Elections in the 2000s ===
General election 2005: Halton
Party	Candidate	Votes	%	±%
Labour	Derek Twigg	21,460	62.8	−6.4
Conservative	Colin Bloom	6,854	20.1	+1.5
Liberal Democrats	Roger Barlow	5,869	17.2	+5.0
Majority		14,606	42.7	−7.9
Turnout		34,183	53.1	−1.0
Labour hold		Swing	−3.9	

General election 2001: Halton
Party	Candidate	Votes	%	±%
Labour	Derek Twigg	23,841	69.2	−1.7
Conservative	Chris Davenport	6,413	18.6	+0.9
Liberal Democrats	Peter Walker	4,216	12.2	+4.9
Majority		17,428	50.6	−2.6
Turnout		34,470	54.1	−14.2
Labour hold		Swing		

=== Elections in the 1990s ===
General election 1997: Halton
Party	Candidate	Votes	%	±%
Labour	Derek Twigg	31,497	70.9	+11.3
Conservative	Philip Balmer	7,847	17.7	−12.6
Liberal Democrats	Janet Jones	3,263	7.3	−1.5
Referendum	Reginald Atkins	1,036	2.3	New
Liberal	David Proffitt	600	1.4	New
Republican	John Alley	196	0.4	New
Majority		23,650	53.2	+23.9
Turnout		44,439	68.3	
Labour hold		Swing		

General election 1992: Halton
Party	Candidate	Votes	%	±%
Labour	Gordon Oakes	35,005	59.7	+4.2
Conservative	Grant Mercer	16,821	28.7	−1.5
Liberal Democrats	David Reaper	6,104	10.4	−3.9
Monster Raving Loony	Stephen Herley	398	0.7	New
Natural Law	Nicola Collins	338	0.6	New
Majority		18,184	31.0	+5.7
Turnout		58,666	78.3	0.0
Labour hold		Swing	+2.9	

=== Elections in the 1980s ===
General election 1987: Halton
Party	Candidate	Votes	%	±%
Labour	Gordon Oakes	32,065	55.5	+9.1
Conservative	John Hardman	17,487	30.2	−3.4
SDP	Flo Clucas	8,272	14.3	−5.7
Majority		14,578	25.3	+12.5
Turnout		57,824	78.3	+5.0
Labour hold		Swing	+6.3	

General election 1983: Halton
Party	Candidate	Votes	%	±%
Labour	Gordon Oakes	24,752	46.4	
Conservative	Philip Pedley	17,923	33.6	
SDP	Thomas Tilling	10,649	20.0	
Majority		6,829	12.8	
Turnout		53,324	73.3	
Labour win (new seat)				

== See also ==
- List of parliamentary constituencies in Cheshire
- History of parliamentary constituencies and boundaries in Cheshire
