= Mark Carlisle =

British politician

The Right Honourable The Lord Carlisle of Bucklow QC DL PC

Secretary of State for Education and Science
- In office 4 May 1979 – 11 September 1981
- Prime Minister: Margaret Thatcher
- Preceded by: Shirley Williams
- Succeeded by: Keith Joseph

Shadow Secretary of State for Education and Science
- In office 6 November 1978 – 4 May 1979
- Leader: Margaret Thatcher
- Preceded by: Norman St John-Stevas
- Succeeded by: Gordon Oakes

Member of the House of Lords
- Lord Temporal
- Life peerage 2 November 1987 – 14 July 2005

Member of Parliament for Warrington South Runcorn (1964–1983)
- In office 15 October 1964 – 18 May 1987
- Preceded by: Dennis Vosper
- Succeeded by: Chris Butler

Personal details
- Born: 7 July 1929
- Died: 14 July 2005 (aged 76)
- Party: Conservative
- Spouse: Sandra des Voeux
- Children: 1
- Education: University of Manchester

Mark Carlisle, Baron Carlisle of Bucklow, QC, DL, PC (7 July 1929 – 14 July 2005) was a British Conservative Party politician and was Member of Parliament (MP) for Runcorn from 1964 to 1983 and then for Warrington South until 1987. Created a life peer in November 1987, he served as Secretary of State for Education and Science from 1979 until 1981.

Mark Carlisle's father was a Manchester cotton merchant, and his parents were in Montevideo, Uruguay, when he was born. He was educated at Radley College in Abingdon, Oxfordshire, and the University of Manchester. He was Chairman of the university's Conservative association, and Federation of university Conservatives in 1953. In 1957 he was vice-chairman of North-West Young Conservatives. He was admitted Gray's Inn, was called to the bar, and made QC in 1971.

== Political career ==
Carlisle was an unsuccessful Conservative candidate at the 1958 St Helens by-election, and lost again in the subsequent 1959 general election.

He was eventually selected for the Cheshire constituency of Runcorn, a rural and suburban seat which he won at the 1964 general election. He was a liberal Tory from the start, voting for the abolition of capital punishment in 1964. Tall, affable and easy-going, he was a more relaxed figure in Edward Heath's party than later under the first female prime minister. He disliked her abrasive manner, and according to The Daily Telegraph "was unhappy as Education secretary". He represented legal and penal policy on the party's 1922 committee. Carlisle was on the board of NACRO for many years and an experienced voice on the Home Office Advisory Council 1966–70. His reasoning on the question of capital punishment was revealed in a Commons speech made twenty years later on 1 April 1987:

There are strong moral objections to the death penalty and to the state taking life. I do not suggest that those objections are by any means absolute. I accept and realise that the state has a responsibility to secure the safety of society. However, I believe that the moral objections to the state taking life mean that the burden of proof for the restoration of capital punishment must rest on those who claim that it is right and necessary to take life. I believe that they can do that only if they can show that the death penalty is a unique deterrent.

He was Under-Secretary of State for Home Affairs from 1970 to 1972 when he became a Minister of State for Home Affairs. Carlisle steered the government Criminal Justice bill through, and warned the prison establishments to improve institutional discipline. The Conservatives were out of office after February 1974 general election, but the new Labour government retained his services on the Franks Immigration committee, as he was practising as a QC. During the 1970s he lived in Dolphin Square.

Carlisle was a Heathite moderate on issues of public expenditure and European integration.

He was appointed Shadow Secretary of State for Education and Science in 1978 before being appointed to the department itself when Margaret Thatcher won the general election in May 1979. Former Labour Cabinet Minister Clare Short has said that it was her low opinion of Carlisle, whom she worked under as a civil servant, which persuaded her to enter elected politics herself because she believed she "could do better" than many of the MPs she dealt with. A liberal traditionalist, Carlisle created the Assisted Places Scheme, which enabled very bright working-class children gain a free place at some of Britain's top public schools. Moreover, as Education Secretary he removed subsidised meals at school dinners on advice that they were not being taken up. What proved the undoing of this cabinet "wet" was a promise of Maintenance Grant funding to local education. Carlisle fell foul of the Prime Minister's economic strategy. In his first budget Geoffrey Howe retained education funding for two years, but by 1981 deeper cuts had been passed. He resisted a total of £1 bn in cuts, but when pushed by the Prime Minister to accept cuts to free school transport, he was forced to back down.

Thatcher wrote in her memoirs that Carlisle "had not proved a particularly effective Education Secretary" and to this effect he was dismissed in the September 1981 Cabinet reshuffle. However he left with ‘courteousness and good humour', which was in contrast to Sir Ian Gilmour who having left the cabinet in the same reshuffle, stormed out of Downing Street, announcing that government policy was "heading for the rocks". Boundary changes meant that Carlisle appeared to change seats at the 1983 general election but in fact areas to the south of Warrington had previously been part of the Runcorn seat. He remained an MP until he stood down at the 1987 general election. On his resignation Bill Cash MP remarked "he has done a great service to his office," at a time when prison policy was hardening, with a requirement for longer sentences from Criminal Justice Acts. He was instrumental in amending a justice bill reforming suspended sentences for youth offenders, who had been treated as adults. He resisted unnecessary amendments leading to the accumulation of executive power over the Court of Appeal. Sales of crossbows were restricted in scope and markets under a prohibitory act. He took a strong line against unlawful immigration.

Later the same year he was elevated to the House of Lords as a life peer with the title Baron Carlisle of Bucklow, of Mobberley in the County of Cheshire on 2 November 1987 where he sat as a Conservative life peer. He was Chairman of the Criminal Injuries Compensation Board from 1989 to 2000.

== Family life ==
Carlisle married Sandra des Voeux, a Cornishwoman; they had a daughter.

Carlisle's brother, Captain Edmund Carlisle (born 1923) was also educated at Radley, and RMA Sandhurst. His sons and grandsons were also educated at the school.

== Media ==
In the 2012 film The Iron Lady he was played by Martin Wimbush.

Parliament of the United Kingdom
Preceded by Dennis Vosper	Member of Parliament for Runcorn; 1964–1983	Constituency abolished
New constituency	Member of Parliament for Warrington South; 1983–1987	Succeeded by Chris Butler
Political offices
Preceded by Shirley Williams	Secretary of State for Education and Science; 1979–1981	Succeeded by Keith Joseph
