= Gordon Oakes =

British politician (1931–2005)

Gordon James Oakes

Member of Parliament for Bolton West
- In office 15 October 1964 – 29 May 1970
- Preceded by: Arthur Holt
- Succeeded by: Robert Redmond

Member of Parliament for Halton Widnes (1971–1983)
- In office 23 September 1971 – 8 April 1997
- Preceded by: James MacColl
- Succeeded by: Derek Twigg

Personal details
- Born: 22 June 1931 Widnes, England
- Died: 14 August 2005 (aged 74)
- Party: Labour
- Spouse: Esther O'Neill (m. 1952; died 1998)
- Children: 3
- Education: Liverpool University
- Profession: Solicitor

Gordon James Oakes (22 June 1931 – 14 August 2005) was a British Labour Party politician.

== Early life ==
Oakes was born in Widnes, Cheshire, and was educated at Wade Deacon Grammar School, in Widnes and at Liverpool University. A solicitor by profession, he became a councillor on Widnes Borough Council in 1952, serving as Mayor in 1964.

== Parliamentary career ==
Oakes unsuccessfully contested Bebington in 1959 and Manchester Moss Side at a 1961 by-election.

He served as Member of Parliament (MP) for Bolton West from 1964 to 1970, when he was beaten by the Conservative Robert Redmond by 1,244 votes. He was returned to Parliament for Widnes in a 1971 by-election and represented the area continuously until his retirement in 1997, first as the MP for Widnes and then for its successor seat of Halton from 1983.

Oakes served as Parliamentary private secretary (PPS) to the Home Secretary Frank Soskice from 1966 to 1967, then as PPS to Education Secretary Tony Crosland until the Conservatives won the 1970 general election. After Labour returned to power in 1974, Oakes served as a Parliamentary under-secretary of state in the Department of the Environment, where he was a passionate advocate of the then-little known practice of waste recycling. When James Callaghan replaced Harold Wilson as Prime Minister, Oakes moved to become a Minister of State in the Department of Education under Shirley Williams, where he worked until Labour lost the 1979 general election. Also in 1979, he was made a member of the Privy Council. Oakes left the Opposition front bench in 1983.

He was one of the MPs approached in the 1994 Cash-for-questions affair, to which he responded "That is not how we do things here".

== Personal life and death ==
Oakes was married to the former Esther O'Neill from 1952 until her death in 1998; they had three sons. He died on 14 August 2005, at the age of 74.

Parliament of the United Kingdom
Preceded by Arthur Holt	Member of Parliament for Bolton West; 1964–1970	Succeeded by Robert Redmond
Preceded by James MacColl	Member of Parliament for Widnes; 1971–1983	Constituency abolished
New constituency	Member of Parliament for Halton; 1983–1997	Succeeded by Derek Twigg
