= List of United Kingdom MPs who died in the 1990s =

This is a list of individuals who were former or serving Members of Parliament for the House of Commons of the United Kingdom who died in the 1990s.

== 1990 ==
Individual	Party	Born	Died	Constituency(ies) represented	Election(s) won
Sir Richard Acland, 15th Baronet	Labour (Others from 1935-1947)	26 November 1906	24 November 1990	Barnstaple Gravesend	1935 1947 (by-election), 1950, 1951
Allen Adams (in office)	Labour	16 February 1946	5 September 1990	Paisley Paisley North	1979 1983, 1987
Sir Peter Agnew, 1st Baronet	Conservative	9 July 1900	26 August 1990	Camborne South Worcestershire	1931, 1935, 1945 1955, 1959, 1964
Walter Alldritt	Labour	4 July 1918	27 July 1990	Liverpool Scotland	1964 (by-election), 1964, 1966, 1970
Fred Blackburn	Labour	29 July 1902	1 May 1990	Stalybridge and Hyde	1951, 1955, 1959, 1964, 1966
Norman Bower	Conservative	18 May 1907	7 December 1990	Harrow Harrow West	1941 (by-election) 1945, 1950
Jock Bruce-Gardyne, Baron Bruce-Gardyne	Conservative	12 April 1930	15 April 1990	South Angus Knutsford	1964, 1966, 1970, 1974 I 1979 (by-election), 1979
Norman Buchan (in office)	Labour	27 October 1922	23 October 1990	West Renfrewshire Paisley South	1964, 1966, 1970, 1974 I & II, 1979 1983, 1987
Michael Carr (in office)	Labour	27 May 1947	20 July 1990	Bootle	1990 (by-election)
Bob Edwards	Labour	16 January 1905	4 June 1990	Bilston Wolverhampton South East	1955, 1959, 1964, 1966, 1970 1974 I & II, 1979, 1983
Eric Fletcher, Baron Fletcher	Labour	26 March 1903	9 June 1990	Islington East	1945, 1950, 1951, 1955, 1959, 1964, 1966
Ian Gow (in office)	Conservative	11 February 1937	30 July 1990	Eastbourne	1974 I & II, 1979, 1983, 1987
Sean Hughes (in office)	Labour	8 May 1946	24 June 1990	Knowsley South	1983, 1987
John Jennings	Conservative	10 February 1903	17 June 1990	Burton	1955, 1959, 1964, 1966, 1970
Ronald Lewis	Labour	16 July 1909	18 June 1990	Carlisle	1964, 1966, 1970, 1974 I & II, 1979, 1983
Ray Mawby	Conservative	6 February 1922	22 July 1990	Totnes	1955, 1959, 1964, 1966, 1970, 1974 I & II, 1979
Harold McCusker (in office)	Ulster Unionist	7 February 1940	12 February 1990	Armagh Upper Bann	1974 I & II, 1979 1983, 1987
Lawrence Orr	Ulster Unionist	16 September 1918	11 July 1990	South Down	1950, 1951, 1955, 1959, 1964, 1966, 1970, 1974 I
Tom Oswald	Labour	1 May 1904	23 October 1990	Edinburgh Central	1951, 1955, 1959, 1964, 1966, 1970
Reginald Paget, Baron Paget of Northampton	Labour	2 September 1908	2 January 1990	Northampton	1945, 1950, 1951, 1955, 1959, 1964, 1966, 1970
Wesley Perrins	Labour	21 September 1905	12 January 1990	Birmingham Yardley	1945
Allan Roberts (in office)	Labour	28 October 1943	21 March 1990	Bootle	1979, 1983, 1987
Emrys Roberts	Liberal	22 September 1910	29 October 1990	Merioneth	1945, 1950
Leslie Spriggs	Labour	22 April 1910	22 May 1990	St Helens	1958 (by-election), 1959, 1964, 1966, 1970, 1974 I & II, 1979
Michael Stewart, Baron Stewart of Fulham	Labour	6 November 1906	13 March 1990	Fulham East Fulham	1945, 1950, 1951 1955, 1959, 1964, 1966, 1970, 1974 I & II
Donald Sumner	Conservative	13 August 1913	12 May 1990	Orpington	1955 (by-election), 1955, 1959
Pat Wall (in office)	Labour	6 May 1933	6 August 1990	Bradford North	1987
William Wells	Labour	10 August 1908	3 January 1990	Walsall Walsall North	1945, 1950, 1951 1955, 1959, 1964, 1966, 1970
Donald Williams	Conservative	17 October 1919	5 January 1990	Dudley	1968 (by-election)

== 1991 ==
Individual	Party	Born	Died	Constituency(ies) represented	Election(s) won
Sir Brian Batsford	Conservative	18 December 1910	5 March 1991	Ealing South	1958 (by-election), 1959, 1964, 1966, 1970
Sir Cyril Black	Conservative	8 April 1902	29 October 1991	Wimbledon	1950, 1951, 1955, 1959, 1964, 1966
Raymond Blackburn	Labour	11 March 1915	3 November 1991	Birmingham King's Norton Birmingham Northfield	1945 1950
Sir Edward Brown	Conservative	15 April 1913	27 August 1991	Bath	1964, 1966, 1970, 1974 I & II
Alick Buchanan-Smith (in office)	Conservative	8 April 1932	29 August 1991	North Angus and Mearns Kincardine and Deeside	1964, 1966, 1970, 1974 I & II, 1979 1983, 1987
George Buckley (in office)	Labour	6 April 1935	14 September 1991	Hemsworth	1987
Elaine Burton, Baroness Burton of Coventry	Labour	2 March 1904	6 October 1991	Coventry South	1950, 1951, 1955
Donald Coleman (in office)	Labour	19 September 1925	14 January 1991	Neath	1964, 1966, 1970, 1974 I & II, 1979, 1983, 1987
Ernest Davies	Labour	18 May 1902	16 September 1991	Enfield Enfield East	1945 1950, 1951, 1955
Raymond Fletcher	Labour	3 December 1921	16 March 1991	Ilkeston	1964, 1966, 1970, 1974 I & II, 1979
Alan Green	Conservative	29 September 1911	2 February 1991	Preston South	1955, 1959, 1970
Judith Hart, Baroness Hart of South Lanark	Labour	18 September 1924	8 December 1991	Lanark Clydesdale	1959, 1964, 1966, 1970, 1974 I & II, 1979 1983
Eric Heffer (in office)	Labour	12 January 1922	27 May 1991	Liverpool Walton	1964, 1966, 1970, 1974 I & II, 1979, 1983, 1987
Richard Holt (in office)	Conservative	2 August 1931	20 September 1991	Langbaurgh	1983, 1987
Adam Hunter	Labour	11 November 1908	9 April 1991	Dunfermline Burghs Dunfermline	1964, 1966, 1970 1974 I & II
Arthur Jones	Conservative	23 October 1915	6 December 1991	South Northamptonshire Daventry	1962 (by-election), 1964, 1966, 1970 1974 I & II
Donald Kaberry, Baron Kaberry of Adel	Conservative	18 August 1907	13 March 1991	Leeds North West	1950, 1951, 1955, 1959, 1964, 1966, 1970, 1974 I & II, 1979
Kenneth Lindsay	Independent (National Labour from 1933-1945)	16 September 1897	4 March 1991	Kilmarnock Combined English Universities	1933 (by-election), 1935 1945
Evan Luard	Labour	31 October 1926	8 February 1991	Oxford	1966, 1974 II
Robert Maxwell	Labour	10 June 1923	5 November 1991	Buckingham	1964, 1966
Hugh Molson, Baron Molson	Conservative	29 June 1903	13 October 1991	Doncaster High Peak	1931 1939 (by-election), 1945, 1950, 1951, 1955, 1959
Sir Godfrey Nicholson	Conservative	9 December 1901	14 July 1991	Morpeth Farnham	1931 1937 (by-election), 1945, 1950, 1951, 1955, 1959, 1964
Sir Francis Pearson	Conservative	13 June 1911	17 February 1991	Clitheroe	1959, 1964, 1966
Rafton Pounder	Ulster Unionist	13 May 1933	16 April 1991	Belfast South	1963 (by-election), 1964, 1966, 1970
Wilfrid Roberts	Liberal	28 August 1900	26 May 1991	North Cumberland	1935, 1945
William Sidney, 1st Viscount De L'Isle	Conservative	23 May 1909	5 April 1991	Chelsea	1944 (by-election)
Bernard Taylor, Baron Taylor of Mansfield	Labour	18 September 1895	11 April 1991	Mansfield	1941 (by-election), 1945, 1950, 1951, 1955, 1959, 1964
Sir John Stradling Thomas (in office)	Conservative	10 June 1925	29 March 1991	Monmouth	1970, 1974 I & II, 1979, 1983, 1987
Lyall Wilkes	Labour	19 May 1914	28 March 1991	Newcastle upon Tyne Central	1945, 1950

== 1992 ==
Individual	Party	Born	Died	Constituency(ies) represented	Election(s) won
Sir John Arbuthnot, 1st Baronet	Conservative	11 February 1912	13 June 1992	Dover	1950, 1951, 1955, 1959
Cyril Bence	Labour	26 November 1902	7 September 1992	East Dunbartonshire	1951, 1955, 1959, 1964, 1966
Richard Bingham	Conservative	26 October 1915	26 July 1992	Liverpool Garston	1957 (by-election), 1959, 1964
Joyce Butler	Labour	13 December 1910	2 January 1992	Wood Green	1955, 1959, 1964, 1966, 1970, 1974 I & II
Terence Clarke	Conservative	17 February 1904	26 May 1992	Portsmouth West	1950, 1951, 1955, 1959, 1964
Elfed Davies, Baron Davies of Penrhys	Labour	9 October 1913	28 April 1992	Rhondda East	1959, 1964, 1966, 1970
Michael Havers, Baron Havers	Conservative	10 March 1923	1 April 1992	Wimbledon	1970, 1974 I & II, 1979, 1983
Sir Godman Irvine	Conservative	25 July 1909	3 May 1992	Rye	1955, 1959, 1964, 1966, 1970, 1974 I & II, 1979
Peter Legh, 4th Baron Newton	Conservative	6 April 1915	16 June 1992	Petersfield	1951, 1955, 1959
Sir David Llewellyn	Conservative	17 January 1916	9 August 1992	Cardiff North	1950, 1951, 1955
Gregor Mackenzie	Labour	15 November 1927	4 May 1992	Rutherglen	1964 (by-election), 1964, 1966, 1970, 1974 I & II, 1979, 1983
John Maclay, 1st Viscount Muirshiel	National Liberal	26 October 1905	17 August 1992	Montrose Burghs West Renfrewshire	1940 (by-election), 1945 1950, 1951, 1955, 1959
Stanley McMaster	Ulster Unionist	23 September 1926	20 October 1992	Belfast East	1959 (by-election), 1959, 1964, 1966, 1970
Sir Charles Mott-Radclyffe	Conservative	25 December 1911	25 November 1992	Windsor	1942 (by-election), 1945, 1950, 1951, 1955, 1959, 1964, 1966
William Paling	Labour	28 October 1892	10 April 1992	Dewsbury	1945, 1950, 1951, 1955
William Rees-Davies	Conservative	19 November 1916	12 January 1992	Isle of Thanet Thanet West	1953 (by-election), 1955, 1959, 1964, 1966, 1970 1974 I & II, 1979
Sidney Schofield	Labour	22 March 1911	4 December 1992	Barnsley	1951
Ronald Scott-Miller	Conservative	1 November 1904	10 March 1992	King's Lynn	1951, 1955
Donald Stewart	Scottish National	17 October 1920	23 August 1992	Western Isles	1970, 1974 I & II, 1979, 1983
Ernest Thornton	Labour	18 May 1905	5 February 1992	Farnworth	1952 (by-election), 1955, 1959, 1964, 1966
Henry Thynne, 6th Marquess of Bath	Conservative	26 January 1905	30 June 1992	Frome	1931
Derek Walker-Smith, Baron Broxbourne	Conservative	13 April 1910	22 January 1992	Hertford East Hertfordshire	1945, 1950, 1951 1955, 1959, 1964, 1966, 1970, 1974 I & II, 1979
Ian Winterbottom, Baron Winterbottom	Labour	6 April 1913	4 July 1992	Nottingham Central	1950, 1951

== 1993 ==
Individual	Party	Born	Died	Constituency(ies) represented	Election(s) won
Robert Adley (in office)	Conservative	2 March 1935	13 May 1993	Bristol North East Christchurch and Lymington Christchurch	1970 1974 I & II, 1979 1983, 1987, 1992
Alice Bacon, Baroness Bacon	Labour	10 September 1909	24 March 1993	Leeds North East Leeds South East	1945, 1950, 1951 1955, 1959, 1964, 1966
Donald Box	Conservative	22 November 1917	12 July 1993	Cardiff North	1959, 1964
James Boyden	Labour	19 October 1910	26 September 1993	Bishop Auckland	1959, 1964, 1966, 1970, 1974 I & II
Jack Browne, Baron Craigton	Conservative (Unionist from 1950-1955)	3 September 1904	28 July 1993	Glasgow Govan Glasgow Craigton	1950, 1951 1955
Ivor Bulmer-Thomas	Conservative (Labour from 1942-1947)	30 November 1905	7 October 1993	Keighley	1942 (by-election), 1945
Judith Chaplin (in office)	Conservative	19 August 1939	19 February 1993	Newbury	1992
Sir Joseph Cleary	Labour	26 October 1902	9 February 1993	Liverpool Wavertree	1935 (by-election)
Leonard Cleaver	Conservative	27 October 1909	7 July 1993	Birmingham Yardley	1959
Aidan Crawley	Conservative (Labour from 1945-1962)	10 April 1908	3 November 1993	Buckingham West Derbyshire	1945, 1950 1962 (by-election), 1964
Ernest Fernyhough	Labour	24 December 1908	16 August 1993	Jarrow	1947 (by-election), 1950, 1951, 1955, 1959, 1964, 1966, 1970, 1974 I & II
Gerry Fowler	Labour	1 January 1935	1 May 1993	The Wrekin	1966, 1974 I & II
Myer Galpern, Baron Galpern	Labour	1 January 1903	23 September 1993	Glasgow Shettleston	1959, 1964, 1966, 1970, 1974 I & II
Ted Garrett	Labour	21 March 1920	30 May 1993	Wallsend	1964, 1966, 1970, 1974 I & II, 1979, 1983, 1987
Jo Grimond, Baron Grimond	Liberal	29 July 1913	24 October 1993	Orkney and Shetland	1950, 1951, 1955, 1959, 1964, 1966, 1970, 1974 I & II, 1979
Mark Hughes	Labour	18 December 1932	19 March 1993	City of Durham	1970, 1974 I & II, 1979, 1983
Michael Hutchison	Conservative (Unionist from 1957-1965)	26 February 1914	21 March 1993	Edinburgh South	1957 (by-election), 1959, 1964, 1966, 1970, 1974 I & II
Denis Keegan	Conservative	26 January 1924	9 October 1993	Nottingham South	1955
Sir John Langford-Holt	Conservative	30 June 1916	23 July 1993	Shrewsbury	1945, 1950, 1951, 1955, 1959, 1964, 1966, 1970, 1974 I & II, 1979
John Litchfield	Conservative	27 August 1903	31 May 1993	Chelsea	1959, 1964
Charles Loughlin	Labour	16 February 1914	23 September 1993	West Gloucestershire	1959, 1964, 1966, 1970, 1974 I
Alex Lyon	Labour	15 October 1931	30 September 1993	York	1966, 1970, 1974 I & II, 1979
Angus Made, Baron Maude of Stratford-upon-Avon	Conservative	8 September 1912	9 November 1993	Ealing South Stratford-upon-Avon	1950, 1951, 1955 1963 (by-election), 1964, 1966, 1970, 1974 I & II, 1979
Sir Michael McNair-Wilson	Conservative	12 October 1920	28 March 1993	Walthamstow East Newbury	1969 (by-election), 1970 1974 I & II, 1979, 1983, 1987
Ian Mikardo	Labour	9 July 1908	6 May 1993	Reading Reading South Poplar Bethnal Green and Bow Bow and Poplar	1945, 1955 1950, 1951 1964, 1966, 1970 1974 I & II, 1979 1983
Sir Peter Mills	Conservative	22 September 1921	16 August 1993	Torrington West Devon Torridge and West Devon	1964, 1966, 1970 1974 I & II, 1979 1983
Oliver Poole, 1st Baron Poole	Conservative	11 August 1911	28 January 1993	Oswestry	1945
Nicholas Ridley, Baron Ridley of Liddesdale	Conservative	17 February 1929	4 March 1993	Cirencester and Tewkesbury	1959, 1964, 1966, 1970, 1974 I & II, 1979, 1983, 1987
Sir John Rodgers, 1st Baronet	Conservative	5 October 1906	29 March 1993	Sevenoaks	1950, 1951, 1955, 1959, 1964, 1966, 1970, 1974 I & II
Stephen Ross, Baron Ross of Newport	Liberal	6 July 1926	10 May 1993	Isle of Wight	1974 I & II, 1979, 1983
Harold Soref	Conservative	18 December 1916	14 March 1993	Ormskirk	1970
George Strauss, Baron Strauss	Labour	18 July 1901	5 June 1993	Lambeth North Vauxhall	1929, 1934 (by-election), 1935, 1945 1950, 1951, 1955, 1959, 1964, 1966, 1970, 1974 I & II
Victor Warrender, 1st Baron Bruntisfield	Conservative	23 June 1899	14 January 1993	Grantham	1923, 1924, 1929, 1931, 1935
Michael Winstanley, Baron Winstanley	Liberal	27 August 1918	18 July 1993	Cheadle Hazel Grove	1966 1974 I

== 1994 ==
Individual	Party	Born	Died	Constituency(ies) represented	Election(s) won
Austen Albu	Labour	21 September 1903	23 November 1994	Edmonton	1948 (by-election), 1950, 1951, 1955, 1959, 1964, 1966, 1970
Sir Alfred Beit, 2nd Baronet	Conservative	19 January 1903	12 May 1994	St Pancras South East	1931, 1935
Humphrey Berkeley	Conservative	21 February 1926	14 November 1994	Lancaster	1959, 1964
John Blackburn (in office)	Conservative	2 September 1933	12 October 1994	Dudley West	1979, 1983, 1987, 1992
Harold Boardman	Labour	12 June 1907	1 August 1994	Leigh	1945, 1950, 1951, 1955, 1959, 1964, 1966, 1970, 1974 I & II
Herbert Bowden, Baron Aylestone	Labour	20 January 1905	30 April 1994	Leicester South Leicester South West	1945 1950, 1951, 1955, 1959, 1964, 1966
Jimmy Boyce (in office)	Labour	6 September 1947	25 January 1994	Rotherham	1992
Mark Bonham Carter, Baron Bonham-Carter	Liberal	11 February 1922	4 September 1994	Torrington	1958 (by-election)
Denys Bullard	Conservative	15 August 1912	2 November 1994	South West Norfolk King's Lynn	1951 1959
Sir Walter Clegg	Conservative	18 April 1920	15 April 1994	North Fylde Wyre	1966, 1970, 1974 I & II, 1979 1983
Bob Cryer (in office)	Labour	3 December 1934	12 April 1994	Keighley Bradford South	1974 I & II, 1979 1987, 1992
Raymond Ellis	Labour	17 December 1923	20 April 1994	North East Derbyshire	1979, 1983
David Ginsburg	Social Democratic (Labour from 1959-1981)	18 March 1921	18 March 1994	Dewsbury	1959, 1964, 1966, 1970, 1974 I & II, 1979
Arthur Vere Harvey, Baron Harvey of Prestbury	Conservative	31 January 1906	5 April 1994	Macclesfield	1945, 1950, 1951, 1955, 1959, 1964, 1966, 1970
Keith Joseph, Baron Joseph	Conservative	17 January 1918	10 December 1994	Leeds North East	1956 (by-election), 1959, 1964, 1966, 1970, 1974 I & II, 1979, 1983
Evelyn King	Conservative (Labour from 1945-1964)	30 May 1907	14 April 1994	Penryn and Falmouth South Dorset	1945 1964, 1966, 1970, 1974 I & II
Ron Leighton (in office)	Labour	24 January 1930	28 February 1994	Newham North East	1979, 1983, 1987, 1992
John Mackie, Baron John-Mackie	Labour	24 November 1909	25 May 1994	Enfield East	1959, 1964, 1966, 1970
Stephen Milligan (in office)	Conservative	12 May 1948	7 February 1994	Eastleigh	1992
Richard Nugent, Baron Nugent of Guildford	Conservative	6 June 1907	16 March 1994	Guildford	1950, 1951, 1955, 1959, 1964
Phelim O'Neill, 2nd Baron Rathcavan	Ulster Unionist	2 November 1909	20 December 1994	North Antrim	1952 (by-election), 1955
Arthur Palmer	Labour	4 August 1912	14 August 1994	Wimbledon Cleveland Bristol Central Bristol North East	1945 1952 (by-election), 1955 1964, 1966, 1970 1974 I & II, 1979
George Park	Labour	27 September 1914	8 May 1994	Coventry North East	1974 I & II, 1979, 1983
Jo Richardson (in office)	Labour	28 August 1923	1 February 1994	Barking	1974 I & II, 1979, 1983, 1987, 1992
Ernie Roberts	Labour	20 April 1912	28 August 1994	Hackney North and Stoke Newington	1979, 1983
Edward Shackleton, Baron Shackleton	Labour	15 July 1911	22 September 1994	Preston Preston South	1946 (by-election) 1950, 1951
Thomas Skeffington-Lodge	Labour	15 January 1905	23 February 1994	Bedford	1945
John Smith (in office)	Labour	13 September 1938	12 May 1994	North Lanarkshire Monklands East	1970, 1974 I & II, 1979 1983, 1987, 1992
John Temple	Conservative	9 June 1910	10 December 1994	City of Chester	1956 (by-election), 1959, 1964, 1966, 1970
Roger Thomas	Labour	14 November 1925	1 September 1994	Carmarthen	1979, 1983
Peter Thorneycroft	Conservative	26 July 1909	4 June 1994	Stafford Monmouth	1938 (by-election) 1945 (by-election), 1950, 1951, 1955, 1959, 1964
Arthur Tiley	Conservative	17 January 1910	5 June 1994	Bradford West	1955, 1959, 1964
Sir John Tilney	Conservative	19 December 1907	26 April 1994	Liverpool Wavertree	1950, 1951, 1955, 1959, 1964, 1966, 1970
Robin Turton, Baron Tranmire	Conservative	8 August 1903	17 January 1994	Thirsk and Malton	1929, 1931, 1935, 1945, 1950, 1951, 1955, 1959, 1964, 1966, 1970
Joan Vickers, Baroness Vickers	Conservative	3 June 1907	23 May 1994	Plymouth Devonport	1955, 1959, 1964, 1966, 1970

== 1995 ==
Individual	Party	Born	Died	Constituency(ies) represented	Election(s) won
David Anderson	Conservative	8 September 1916	31 December 1995	Dumfriesshire	1963 (by-election)
Seymour Berry, 2nd Viscount Camrose	Conservative	12 July 1909	15 February 1995	Hitchin	1941 (by-election)
Arthur Bottomley, Baron Bottomley	Labour	7 February 1907	3 November 1995	Chatham Rochester and Chatham Middlesbrough East Middlesbrough	1945 1950, 1951, 1955 1962 (by-election), 1964, 1966, 1970 1974 I & II, 1979
Somerset de Chair	Conservative	22 August 1921	5 January 1995	South West Norfolk Paddington South	1935 1950
Geoffrey Cooper	Labour	18 February 1907	10 April 1995	Middlesbrough West	1945, 1950
Geoffrey Dickens (in office)	Conservative	26 August 1931	17 May 1995	Huddersfield West Littleborough and Saddleworth	1979 1983, 1987, 1992
Alec Douglas-Home, Baron Home of the Hirsel	Conservative (Unionist from 1931-1963)	2 July 1903	9 October 1995	Lanark Kinross and Western Perthshire	1931, 1935, 1950 1963 (by-election), 1964, 1966, 1970, 1974 I
David Ennals, Baron Ennals	Labour	19 August 1922	17 June 1995	Dover Norwich North	1964, 1966 1974 I & II, 1979
Derek Enright (in office)	Labour	2 August 1935	31 October 1995	Hemsworth	1991 (by-election), 1992
Sir Nicholas Fairbairn (in office)	Conservative	24 December 1933	19 February 1995	Kinross and Western Perthshire Perth and Kinross	1974 II, 1979 1983, 1987, 1992
Patricia Ford	Ulster Unionist	5 April 1921	23 May 1995	North Down	1953 (by-election)
Edward Griffiths	Labour	7 March 1929	18 October 1995	Sheffield Brightside	1968 (by-election), 1970, 1974 I
Sir Michael Higgs	Conservative	30 May 1912	20 October 1995	Bromsgrove	1950, 1951
Dennis Hobden	Labour	21 January 1920	20 April 1995	Brighton Kemptown	1964, 1966
Arthur Holt	Liberal	8 August 1914	23 August 1995	Bolton West	1951, 1955, 1959
Billy Hughes	Labour	7 September 1914	15 November 1995	Wolverhampton West	1945
Sir Charles Irving	Conservative	6 May 1924	30 March 1995	Cheltenham	1974 II, 1979, 1983, 1987
James Johnson	Labour	16 September 1908	31 January 1995	Rugby Hull West	1950, 1951, 1955 1964, 1966, 1970, 1974 I & II, 1979
Denis Kendall	Independent	27 May 1903	19 July 1995	Grantham	1942 (by-election), 1945
Sir James Kilfedder (in office)	Ulster Popular Unionist (Others from 1964-1980)	16 July 1928	20 March 1995	Belfast West North Down	1964 1970, 1974 I & II, 1979, 1983, 1987, 1992
Harold Lever, Baron Lever of Manchester	Labour	15 January 1914	6 August 1995	Manchester Exchange Manchester Cheetham Manchester Central	1945 1950, 1951, 1955, 1959, 1964, 1966, 1970 1974 I & II, 1979
Sir David Lightbown (in office)	Conservative	30 November 1932	12 December 1995	South East Staffordshire	1983, 1987, 1992
Thomas Martin	Conservative	13 November 1901	28 January 1995	Blaydon	1931
Victor Montagu	Conservative	22 May 1906	25 February 1995	South Dorset	1941 (by-election), 1945, 1950, 1951, 1955, 1959
Geraint Morgan	Conservative	2 November 1920	2 July 1995	Denbigh	1959, 1964, 1966, 1970, 1974 I & II, 1979
Sir Peter Morrison	Conservative	2 June 1944	13 July 1995	City of Chester	1974 I & II, 1979, 1983, 1987
Reg Moss	Labour	5 December 1913	28 May 1995	Meriden	1955
Fred Mulley, Baron Mulley	Labour	3 July 1918	15 March 1995	Sheffield Park	1950, 1951, 1955, 1959, 1964, 1966, 1970, 1974 I & II, 1979
Trevor Park	Labour	12 December 1927	6 April 1995	South East Derbyshire	1964, 1966
Phil Piratin	Communist	15 May 1907	10 December 1995	Mile End	1945
Sir James Scott-Hopkins	Conservative	29 November 1921	11 March 1995	North Cornwall West Derbyshire	1959, 1964 1967 (by-election), 1970, 1974 I & II
John Vaughan-Morgan, Baron Reigate	Conservative	2 February 1905	26 January 1995	Reigate	1950, 1951, 1955, 1959, 1964, 1966
Harold Watkinson, 1st Viscount Watkinson	Conservative	25 January 1910	19 December 1995	Woking	1950, 1951, 1955, 1959
Harold Wilson, Baron Wilson of Rievaulx	Labour	11 March 1916	23 May 1995	Ormskirk Huyton	1945 1950, 1951, 1955, 1959, 1964, 1966, 1970, 1974 I & II, 1979

== 1996 ==
Individual	Party	Born	Died	Constituency(ies) represented	Election(s) won
Julian Amery, Baron Amery of Lustleigh	Conservative	27 March 1919	3 September 1996	Preston North Brighton Pavilion	1950, 1951, 1955, 1959, 1964 1969 (by-election), 1970, 1974 I & II, 1979, 1983, 1987
Ernest Armstrong	Labour	12 January 1915	8 July 1996	North West Durham	1964, 1966, 1970, 1974 I & II, 1979, 1983
Humphrey Atkins, Baron Colnbrook	Conservative	12 August 1922	4 October 1996	Merton and Morden Spelthorne	1955, 1959, 1964, 1966 1970, 1974 I & II, 1979, 1983
David Bevan	Conservative	10 April 1928	12 October 1996	Birmingham Yardley	1979, 1983, 1987
Reginald Bevins	Conservative	20 August 1908	16 November 1996	Liverpool Toxteth	1950, 1951, 1955, 1959
Anthony Bourne-Arton	Conservative	1 March 1913	28 May 1996	Darlington	1959
Robert Brown	Labour	16 May 1921	3 September 1996	Newcastle upon Tyne West Newcastle upon Tyne North	1966, 1970, 1974 I & II, 1979 1983
Peter Doig	Labour	27 October 1911	31 October 1996	Dundee West	1963 (by-election), 1964, 1966, 1970, 1974 I & II
John Dunlop	United Ulster Unionist (Vanguard from 1974-1975)	20 May 1910	10 March 1996	Mid Ulster	1974 I & II, 1979
Geoffrey Finsberg, Baron Finsberg	Conservative	13 June 1926	8 October 1996	Hampstead Hampstead and Highgate	1970, 1974 I & II, 1979 1983, 1987
Sir Nigel Fisher	Conservative	14 July 1913	9 October 1996	Hitchin Surbiton	1950, 1951 1955, 1959, 1964, 1966, 1970, 1974 I & II, 1979, 1983
Peggy Herbison	Labour	11 March 1907	29 December 1996	North Lanarkshire	1945, 1950, 1951, 1955, 1959, 1964, 1966
John Hope, 1st Baron Glendevon	Unionist (Conservative from 1945-1950)	7 April 1912	18 January 1996	Midlothian and Peebles North Edinburgh Pentlands	1945 1950, 1951, 1955, 1959
Henry Hopkinson, 1st Baron Colyton	Conservative	3 January 1902	6 January 1996	Taunton	1950, 1951, 1955
Douglas Houghton, Baron Houghton of Sowerby	Labour	11 August 1898	2 May 1996	Sowerby	1949 (by-election), 1950, 1951, 1955, 1959, 1964, 1966, 1970
Douglas Jay, Baron Jay	Labour	23 March 1907	6 March 1996	Battersea North	1946 (by-election), 1950, 1951, 1955, 1959, 1964, 1966, 1970, 1974 I & II, 1979
Ted Leadbitter	Labour	18 June 1919	23 December 1996	The Hartlepools Hartlepool	1964, 1966, 1970 1974 I & II, 1979, 1983, 1987
Niall MacDermot	Labour	10 September 1916	22 February 1996	Lewisham North Derby North	1957 (by-election) 1962 (by-election), 1964, 1966
Sir Fitzroy Maclean, 1st Baronet	Unionist (Conservative from 1941-1959)	11 March 1911	15 June 1996	Lancaster Bute and North Ayrshire	1941 (by-election), 1945, 1950, 1951, 1955 1959, 1964, 1966, 1970
Margaret McKay	Labour	22 January 1907	1 March 1996	Clapham	1964, 1966
Colin Mitchell	Conservative	17 November 1925	20 July 1996	West Aberdeenshire	1970
John Morrison, 1st Baron Margadale	Conservative	16 December 1906	25 May 1996	Salisbury	1942 (by-election), 1945, 1950, 1951, 1955, 1959, 1964
C. H. Mullan	Ulster Unionist	17 February 1912	26 October 1996	Down	1946 (by-election)
Sir Basil Nield	Conservative	7 May 1903	4 December 1996	City of Chester	1940 (by-election), 1945, 1950, 1951, 1955
Terry Patchett (in office)	Labour	11 July 1940	11 October 1996	Barnsley East	1983, 1987, 1992
Barry Porter (in office)	Conservative	11 June 1939	3 November 1996	Bebington and Ellesmere Port Wirral South	1979 1983, 1987, 1992
Sir Kenneth Robinson	Labour	19 March 1911	16 February 1996	St Pancras North	1949 (by-election), 1950, 1951, 1955, 1959, 1964, 1966
Julius Silverman	Labour	8 December 1905	21 September 1996	Birmingham Erdington Birmingham Aston	1945, 1950, 1951, 1974 I & II, 1979 1955, 1959, 1964, 1966, 1970
Henry Usborne	Labour	16 January 1909	16 March 1996	Birmingham Acock's Green Birmingham Yardley	1945 1950, 1951, 1955

== 1997 ==
Individual	Party	Born	Died	Constituency(ies) represented	Election(s) won
David Austick	Liberal	8 March 1920	9 February 1997	Ripon	1973 (by-election)
Sir Nicholas Baker	Conservative	23 November 1938	25 April 1997	North Dorset	1979, 1983, 1987, 1992
Syd Bidwell	Labour	14 January 1917	25 May 1997	Southall Ealing Southall	1966, 1970, 1974 I & II, 1979 1983, 1987
Robert Cant	Labour	24 July 1915	13 July 1997	Stoke-on-Trent Central	1966, 1970, 1974 I & II, 1979
Ivor Clemitson	Labour	8 December 1931	24 December 1997	Luton East	1974 I & II
Jimmy Dunnachie	Labour	17 November 1930	7 September 1997	Glasgow Pollok	1987, 1992
Sir John Farr	Conservative	25 September 1922	25 October 1997	Harborough	1959, 1964, 1966, 1970, 1974 I & II, 1979, 1983, 1987
Robert Grant-Ferris, Baron Harvington	Conservative	30 December 1907	1 January 1997	St Pancras North Nantwich	1937 (by-election) 1955, 1959, 1964, 1966, 1970
John Horner	Labour	5 November 1911	11 February 1997	Oldbury and Halesowen	1964, 1966
Hugh Lawson	Common Wealth	13 February 1912	23 March 1997	Skipton	1944 (by-election)
Sir Kenneth Lewis	Conservative	1 July 1916	2 July 1997	Rutland and Stamford Stamford and Spalding	1959, 1964, 1966, 1970, 1974 I & II, 1979 1983
James Lindsay	Conservative	16 December 1906	27 August 1997	North Devon	1955
Sir Gilbert Longden	Conservative	16 April 1902	16 October 1997	South West Hertfordshire	1950, 1951, 1955, 1959, 1964, 1966, 1970
Christopher Mayhew	Liberal (Labour from 1945-1974)	12 June 1915	7 January 1997	South Norfolk Woolwich East	1945 1951, 1955, 1959, 1964, 1966, 1970, 1974 I
Patricia McLaughlin	Ulster Unionist	23 June 1916	7 January 1997	Belfast West	1955, 1959
Gordon McMaster (in office)	Labour	13 February 1960	28 July 1997	Paisley South	1990 (by-election), 1992, 1997
Iain Mills (in office)	Conservative	21 April 1940	16 January 1997	Meriden	1979, 1983, 1987, 1992
Edward Moeran	Labour	27 November 1903	12 December 1997	South Bedfordshire	1950
Sir Tom Normanton	Conservative	12 March 1917	6 August 1997	Cheadle	1970, 1974 I & II, 1979, 1983
Ossie O'Brien	Labour	6 April 1928	6 March 1997	Darlington	1983 (by-election)
Eric Ogden	Social Democratic (Labour from 1964-1981)	23 August 1923	5 May 1997	Liverpool West Derby	1964, 1966, 1970, 1974 I & II, 1979
Martin Redmond (in office)	Labour	15 August 1937	20 January 1997	Don Valley	1983, 1987, 1992
Geoffrey Rippon, Baron Rippon of Hexham	Conservative	28 May 1924	28 January 1997	Norwich South Hexham	1955, 1959 1966, 1970, 1974 I & II, 1979, 1983
Granville Maynard Sharp	Labour	5 January 1906	8 August 1997	Spen Valley	1945
Sir Michael Shersby (in office)	Conservative	17 February 1933	8 May 1997	Uxbridge	1972 (by-election), 1974 I & II, 1979, 1983, 1987, 1992, 1997
George Thomas, 1st Viscount Tonypandy	Speaker (Labour from 1945-1976)	29 January 1909	22 September 1997	Cardiff Central Cardiff West	1945 1950, 1951, 1955, 1959, 1964, 1966, 1970, 1974 I & II, 1979
Robert Woof	Labour	24 November 1911	27 November 1997	Blaydon	1956 (by-election), 1959, 1964, 1966, 1970, 1974 I & II
Woodrow Wyatt, Baron Wyatt of Weeford	Labour	4 July 1918	7 December 1997	Birmingham Aston Bosworth	1945, 1950, 1951 1959, 1964, 1966

== 1998 ==
Individual	Party	Born	Died	Constituency(ies) represented	Election(s) won
Cuthbert Alport, Baron Alport	Conservative	22 March 1918	28 October 1998	Colchester	1950, 1951, 1955, 1959
John Boyd-Carpenter, Baron Boyd-Carpenter	Conservative	2 June 1908	11 July 1998	Kingston-upon-Thames	1945, 1950, 1951, 1955, 1959, 1964, 1966, 1970
Nicholas Budgen	Conservative	3 November 1937	26 October 1998	Wolverhampton South West	1974 I & II, 1979, 1983, 1987, 1992
David Crouch	Conservative	23 June 1919	18 February 1998	Canterbury	1966, 1970, 1974 I & II, 1979, 1983
Simon Wingfield Digby	Conservative	13 February 1910	22 March 1998	West Dorset	1941 (by-election), 1945, 1950, 1951, 1955, 1959, 1964, 1966, 1970
Sir Anthony Fell	Conservative	18 May 1914	20 March 1998	Yarmouth	1951, 1955, 1959, 1964, 1970, 1974 I & II, 1979
Sir Alan Glyn	Conservative	26 September 1918	4 May 1998	Clapham Windsor Windsor and Maidenhead	1959 1970 1974 I & II, 1979, 1983, 1987
Edgar Granville, Baron Granville of Eye	Liberal	12 February 1898	14 February 1998	Eye	1929, 1931, 1935, 1945, 1950
Percy Grieve	Conservative	25 March 1915	22 August 1998	Solihull	1964, 1966, 1970, 1974 I & II, 1979
Norman Haseldine	Labour	25 March 1922	16 October 1998	Bradford West	1966
John Hay	Conservative	24 November 1919	27 January 1998	Henley	1950, 1951, 1955, 1959, 1964, 1966, 1970
Frank Haynes	Labour	8 March 1926	11 September 1998	Ashfield	1979, 1983, 1987
Denis Howell, Baron Howell	Labour	4 September 1923	19 April 1998	Birmingham All Saints Birmingham Small Heath	1955 1961 (by-election), 1964, 1966, 1970, 1974 I & II, 1979, 1983, 1987
Tom Iremonger	Conservative	14 March 1916	13 May 1998	Ilford North	1954 (by-election), 1955, 1959, 1964, 1966, 1970, 1974 I
Sir Edgar Keatinge	Conservative	3 February 1905	7 August 1998	Bury St Edmunds	1944 (by-election)
Sir David Lane	Conservative	24 September 1922	16 November 1998	Cambridge	1967 (by-election), 1970, 1974 I & II
Joan Lestor, Baroness Lestor of Eccles	Labour	13 November 1931	27 March 1998	Eton and Slough Eccles	1966, 1970, 1974 I & II, 1979 1987, 1992
Arthur Lewis	Labour	21 February 1917	25 June 1998	Upton West Ham North Newham North West	1945 1950, 1951, 1955, 1959, 1964, 1966, 1970 1974 I & II, 1979
Laddie Lucas	Conservative	2 September 1915	28 March 1998	Brentford and Chiswick	1950, 1951, 1955
Joan Maynard	Labour	5 July 1921	27 March 1998	Sheffield Brightside	1974 II, 1979, 1983
Sir Robert McCrindle	Conservative	19 September 1929	8 October 1998	Billericay Brentwood and Ongar	1970 1974 I & II, 1979, 1983, 1987
Robert McIntyre	Scottish National	15 December 1913	2 February 1998	Motherwell	1945 (by-election)
Bob Mellish, Baron Mellish	Labour	3 March 1913	9 May 1998	Rotherhithe Bermondsey	1946 (by-election) 1950, 1951, 1955, 1959, 1964, 1966, 1970, 1974 I & II, 1979
Sir Ian Percival	Conservative	11 May 1921	4 April 1998	Southport	1959, 1964, 1966, 1970, 1974 I & II, 1979, 1983
Ernest Perry	Labour	25 April 1910	28 December 1998	Battersea South	1964, 1966, 1970, 1974 I & II
George Perry	Labour	24 August 1920	1 June 1998	Nottingham South	1966
Enoch Powell	Ulster Unionist (Conservative from 1950-1974)	16 June 1912	8 February 1998	Wolverhampton South West South Down	1950, 1951, 1955, 1959, 1964, 1966, 1970 1974 II, 1979, 1983
Sir Rupert Speir	Conservative	10 September 1910	16 September 1998	Hexham	1951, 1955, 1959, 1964
Thomas Torney	Labour	2 July 1915	21 October 1998	Bradford South	1970, 1974 I & II, 1979, 1983
Edwin Wainwright	Labour	August 1908	22 January 1998	Dearne Valley	1959, 1964, 1966, 1970, 1974 I & II, 1979
Sir Patrick Wall	Conservative	14 October 1916	15 May 1998	Haltemprice Beverley	1954 (by-election), 1955, 1959, 1964, 1966, 1970, 1974 I & II, 1979 1983

== 1999 ==
Individual	Party	Born	Died	Constituency(ies) represented	Election(s) won
Lionel Berry, 2nd Viscount Kemsley	Conservative	29 June 1909	28 February 1999	Buckingham	1943 (by-election)
Sir Ashley Bramall	Labour	6 January 1916	10 February 1999	Bexley	1946 (by-election)
Alan Clark (in office)	Conservative	13 April 1928	5 September 1999	Plymouth Sutton Kensington and Chelsea	1974 I & II, 1979, 1983, 1987 1997
Petre Crowder	Conservative	18 July 1919	16 February 1999	Ruislip-Northwood	1950, 1951, 1955, 1959, 1964, 1966, 1970, 1974 I & II
Joseph Dean, Baron Dean of Beswick	Labour	3 June 1923	26 February 1999	Leeds West	1974 I & II, 1979
Edmund Dell	Labour	15 August 1921	1 November 1999	Birkenhead	1964, 1966, 1970, 1974 I & II
David Eccles, 1st Viscount Eccles	Conservative	18 September 1904	24 February 1999	Chippenham	1943 (by-election), 1945, 1950, 1951, 1955, 1959
Sir Russell Fairgrieve	Conservative	3 May 1924	17 February 1999	West Aberdeenshire	1974 I & II, 1979
Derek Fatchett (Note: Ward, Lucy; Correspondent, Political (11 June 1999). "Benn's son wins stay-at-home byelection". The Guardian. ISSN 0261-3077.) (in office)	Labour	22 August 1945	9 May 1999	Leeds Central	1983, 1987, 1992, 1997
John Golding	Labour	9 March 1931	20 January 1999	Newcastle-under-Lyme	1969 (by-election), 1970, 1974 I & II, 1979, 1983
Sir James Hill	Conservative	21 December 1926	16 February 1999	Southampton Test	1970, 1974 I, 1979, 1983, 1987, 1992
William Hilton	Labour	21 March 1926	12 June 1999	Bethnal Green	1966, 1970
Sir Robert Rhodes James	Conservative	10 April 1933	20 May 1999	Cambridge	1976 (by-election), 1979, 1983, 1987
Tony Leavey	Conservative	3 March 1915	9 July 1999	Heywood and Royton	1955, 1959
Alistair Macdonald	Labour	18 May 1925	6 February 1999	Chislehurst	1966
Sir Anthony Nutting	Conservative	11 January 1920	24 February 1999	Melton	1945, 1950, 1951, 1955
Michael O'Halloran	Independent Labour (Others from 1969-1983)	20 August 1933	29 November 1999	Islington North	1969 (by-election), 1970, 1974 I & II, 1979
Jack Oldfield	Labour	5 July 1899	11 December 1999	South East Essex	1929
Albert Oram, Baron Oram	Labour	13 August 1913	5 September 1999	East Ham South	1955, 1959, 1964, 1966, 1970
Ian Orr-Ewing, Baron Orr-Ewing	Conservative	10 February 1912	19 August 1999	Hendon North	1950, 1951, 1955, 1959, 1964, 1966
William Price	Labour	15 June 1934	6 May 1999	Rugby	1966, 1970, 1974 I & II
Simon Ramsay, 16th Earl of Dalhousie	Unionist	17 October 1914	15 July 1999	Forfar	1945
Alfred Robens, Baron Robens of Woldingham	Labour	18 December 1910	27 June 1999	Wansbeck Blyth	1945 1950, 1951, 1955, 1959
Roger Stott (in office)	Labour	7 August 1943	8 August 1999	Westhoughton Wigan	1973 (by-election), 1974 I & II, 1979 1983, 1987, 1992, 1997
Sir William van Straubenzee	Conservative	27 January 1924	2 November 1999	Wokingham	1959, 1964, 1966, 1970, 1974 I & II, 1979, 1983
Sir Richard Thompson, 1st Baronet	Conservative	5 October 1912	15 July 1999	Croydon West Croydon South	1950, 1951 1955, 1959, 1964, 1970
James Tinn	Labour	23 August 1922	18 November 1999	Cleveland Redcar	1964, 1966, 1970 1974 I & II, 1979, 1983
Eirene White, Baroness White	Labour	7 November 1909	23 December 1999	East Flintshire	1950, 1951, 1955, 1959, 1964, 1966
William Whitelaw, 1st Viscount Whitelaw	Conservative	28 June 1918	1 July 1999	Penrith and The Border	1955, 1959, 1964, 1966, 1970, 1974 I & II, 1979, 1983
Christopher York	Conservative	27 July 1909	13 March 1999	Ripon Harrogate	1939 (by-election), 1945 1950, 1951

== See also ==
- List of United Kingdom MPs who died in the 2000s
- List of United Kingdom MPs who died in the 2010s
- List of United Kingdom MPs who died in the 2020s
