= List of United Kingdom MPs by decade of death =

This is a list of individuals who were former or serving Members of Parliament for the House of Commons of the United Kingdom by decade of death.

== List ==
- List of United Kingdom MPs who died in the 1990s
- List of United Kingdom MPs who died in the 2000s
- List of United Kingdom MPs who died in the 2010s
- List of United Kingdom MPs who died in the 2020s
