= List of United Kingdom MPs who died in the 2020s =

This is a list of individuals who were former or serving Members of Parliament for the House of Commons of the United Kingdom and who died in the 2020s.

== 2020 ==
Individual	Party	Born	Died	Constituency(ies) represented	Election(s) won
Joe Ashton	Labour	9 October 1933	30 March 2020	Bassetlaw	1968 (by-election), 1970, 1974 I & II, 1979, 1983, 1987, 1992, 1997
Ronald Atkins	Labour	13 June 1916	30 December 2020	Preston North	1966, 1974 I & II
Harold Best	Labour	18 December 1937	24 August 2020	Leeds North West	1997, 2001
Brian Binley	Conservative	1 April 1942	25 December 2020	Northampton South	2005, 2010
Gerald Bowden	Conservative	26 August 1935	7 January 2020	Dulwich	1983, 1987
Christopher Brocklebank-Fowler	Social Democratic (Note: Served as a Conservative MP from 1970–1981)	13 January 1934	29 May 2020	King's Lynn North West Norfolk	1970 1974 I & II, 1979
Raymond Carter	Labour	17 September 1935	2 July 2020	Birmingham Northfield	1970, 1974 I & II
Ernest Davies	Labour	25 October 1926	8 March 2020	Stretford	1966
Terry Dicks	Conservative	17 March 1937	17 June 2020	Hayes and Harlington	1983, 1987, 1992
John Eden, Baron Eden of Winton	Conservative	15 September 1925	23 May 2020	Bournemouth West	1954 (by-election), 1955, 1959, 1964, 1966, 1970, 1974 I & II, 1979
Maria Fyfe	Labour	25 November 1938	3 December 2020	Glasgow Maryhill	1987, 1992, 1997
Tristan Garel-Jones, Baron Garel-Jones	Conservative	28 February 1941	23 March 2020	Watford	1979, 1983, 1987, 1992
Bruce George	Labour	1 June 1942	24 February 2020	Walsall South	1974 I & II, 1979, 1983, 1987, 1992, 1997, 2001, 2005
Ted Graham, Baron Graham of Edmonton	Labour	26 March 1925	21 March 2020	Edmonton	1974 I & II, 1979
John Hume	Social Democratic and Labour	18 January 1937	3 August 2020	Foyle	1983, 1987, 1992, 1997, 2001
Peter Jackson	Labour	14 October 1928	23 March 2020	High Peak	1966
John Lee	Labour	13 August 1927	14 April 2020	Reading Birmingham Handsworth	1966 1974 I & II
Robert Maclennan, Baron Maclennan of Rogart	Liberal Democrats (Note: Served as a Labour MP from 1966–1981 and an SDP MP from 1981–1988)	26 June 1936	18 January 2020	Caithness and Sutherland Caithness, Sutherland and Easter Ross	1966, 1970, 1974 I & II, 1979, 1983, 1987, 1992 1997
Diana Maddock, Baroness Maddock	Liberal Democrats	19 May 1945	26 June 2020	Christchurch	1993 (by-election)
Seamus Mallon	Social Democratic and Labour	17 August 1936	24 January 2020	Newry and Armagh	1986 (by-election), 1987, 1992, 1997, 2001
Tom Mitchell	Sinn Féin	29 July 1931	22 July 2020	Mid Ulster	1955, 1955 (by-election)
David Mudd	Conservative	2 June 1933	28 April 2020	Falmouth and Camborne	1970, 1974 I & II, 1979, 1983, 1987
Bill Olner	Labour	9 May 1942	18 May 2020	Nuneaton	1992, 1997, 2001, 2005
Martin O'Neill, Baron O'Neill of Clackmannan	Labour	6 January 1945	26 August 2020	Clackmannan and Eastern Stirlingshire Clackmannan Ochil	1979 1983, 1987, 1992 1997, 2001
John Powley	Conservative	3 August 1936	16 October 2020	Norwich South	1983
James Ramsden	Conservative	1 November 1923	29 March 2020	Harrogate	1954 (by-election), 1955, 1959, 1964, 1966, 1970
Tim Renton, Baron Renton of Mount Harry	Conservative	28 May 1932	25 August 2020	Mid Sussex	1974 I & II, 1979, 1983, 1987, 1992
Sir Hugh Rossi	Conservative	21 June 1927	14 April 2020	Hornsey Hornsey and Wood Green	1966, 1970, 1974 I & II, 1979 1983, 1987
Robert Sheldon, Baron Sheldon	Labour	13 September 1923	2 February 2020	Ashton-under-Lyne	1964, 1966, 1970, 1974 I & II, 1979, 1983, 1987, 1992, 1997
David Stoddart, Baron Stoddart of Swindon	Labour	4 May 1926	14 November 2020	Swindon	1970, 1974 I & II, 1979
Ronald Thomas (Note: "Thomas, Ronald Richard, (16 March 1929–19 Dec. 2020)". WHO'S WHO & WHO WAS WHO. doi:10.1093/ww/9780199540884.013.u37457. ISBN 978-0-19-954088-4.)	Labour	16 March 1929	19 December 2020	Bristol North West	1974 II
Richard Tracey	Conservative	8 February 1943	20 March 2020	Surbiton	1983, 1987, 1992
Sir Peter Viggers	Conservative	13 March 1938	19 March 2020	Gosport	1974 I & II, 1979, 1983, 1987, 1992, 1997, 2001, 2005

== 2021 ==
Individual	Party	Born	Died	Constituency(ies) represented	Election(s) won
Peter Ainsworth	Conservative	16 November 1956	6 April 2021	East Surrey	1992, 1997, 2001, 2005
Sir David Amess (in office)	Conservative	26 March 1952	15 October 2021	Basildon Southend West	1983, 1987, 1992 1997, 2001, 2005, 2010, 2015, 2017, 2019
James Brokenshire (in office)	Conservative	8 January 1968	7 October 2021	Hornchurch Old Bexley and Sidcup	2005 2010, 2015, 2017, 2019
Sir John Butterfill	Conservative	14 February 1941	7 November 2021	Bournemouth West	1983, 1987, 1992, 1997, 2001, 2005
Eric Cockeram	Conservative	4 July 1924	25 December 2021	Bebington Ludlow	1970 1979, 1983
Maureen Colquhoun	Labour	12 August 1928	2 February 2021	Northampton North	1974 I & II
Hywel Francis	Labour	6 June 1946	14 February 2021	Aberavon	2001, 2005, 2010
Ian Gibson	Labour	26 September 1938	9 April 2021	Norwich North	1997, 2001, 2005
Dame Cheryl Gillan (in office)	Conservative	21 April 1952	4 April 2021	Chesham and Amersham	1992, 1997, 2001, 2005, 2010, 2015, 2017, 2019
Mary Holt	Conservative	31 July 1924	17 February 2021	Preston North	1970
Robert Howarth	Labour	31 July 1927	2 April 2021	Bolton East	1964, 1966
Frank Judd, Baron Judd	Labour	28 March 1935	17 April 2021	Portsmouth West Portsmouth North	1966, 1970 1974 I & II
Dick Leonard	Labour	12 December 1930	24 June 2021	Romford	1970
Sir Jim Lester	Conservative	23 May 1932	31 October 2021	Beeston Broxtowe	1974 I & II, 1979 1983, 1987, 1992
Paul Marland	Conservative	19 March 1940	7 April 2021	West Gloucestershire	1979, 1983, 1987, 1992
Austin Mitchell	Labour	19 September 1934	18 August 2021	Great Grimsby	1977 (by-election), 1979, 1983, 1987, 1992, 1997, 2001, 2005, 2010
Elystan Morgan, Baron Elystan-Morgan	Labour	7 December 1932	7 July 2021	Cardiganshire	1966, 1970
Stan Newens	Labour	4 February 1930	2 March 2021	Epping Harlow	1966 1974 I & II, 1979
Peter Pike	Labour	26 June 1937	27 December 2021	Burnley	1983, 1987, 1992, 1997, 2001
Ernie Ross	Labour	27 July 1942	17 October 2021	Dundee West	1979, 1983, 1987, 1992, 1997, 2001
Michael Shaw, Baron Shaw of Northstead	Conservative (Note: Served as a National Liberal MP from 1960–1966)	9 October 1920	8 January 2021	Brighouse and Spenborough Scarborough and Whitby Scarborough	1960 (by-election) 1966, 1970 1974 I & II, 1979, 1983, 1987
Llew Smith	Labour	16 April 1944	26 May 2021	Blaenau Gwent	1992, 1997, 2001
Sir Dennis Walters	Conservative	28 November 1928	1 October 2021	Westbury	1964, 1966, 1970, 1974 I & II, 1979, 1983, 1987
Mike Weatherley	Conservative	2 July 1957	20 May 2021	Hove	2010
Andrew Welsh	Scottish National	19 April 1944	18 June 2021	South Angus East Angus Angus	1974, II 1987, 1992 1997
Shirley Williams, Baroness Williams of Crosby	Social Democratic Party (Note: Served as a Labour MP from 1964–1979, then as an SDP MP from 1981–83 before joining the Liberal Democrats and serving as a peer for the party.)	27 July 1930	12 April 2021	Hitchin Hertford and Stevenage Crosby	1964, 1966, 1970 1974 I & II 1981 (by-election)

== 2022 ==
Individual	Party	Born	Died	Constituency(ies) represented	Election(s) won
Bob Blizzard	Labour	31 May 1950	5 May 2022	Waveney	1997, 2001, 2005
David Chidgey, Baron Chidgey	Liberal Democrats	9 July 1942	15 February 2022	Eastleigh	1994 (by-election), 1997, 2001
Jack Dromey (in office)	Labour	29 September 1948	7 January 2022	Birmingham Erdington	2010, 2015, 2017, 2019
Ronnie Fearn, Baron Fearn	Liberal Democrats (Note: Served as a Liberal MP from 1987–1988)	6 February 1931	24 January 2022	Southport	1987, 1997
Ben Ford	Labour	1 April 1925	17 April 2022	Bradford North	1964, 1966, 1970, 1974 I & II, 1979
Robert Hughes, Baron Hughes of Woodside	Labour	3 January 1932	7 January 2022	Aberdeen North	1970, 1974 I & II, 1979, 1983, 1987, 1992
Nigel Jones, Baron Jones of Cheltenham	Liberal Democrats	30 March 1948	7 November 2022	Cheltenham	1992, 1997, 2001
Jill Knight, Baroness Knight of Collingtree	Conservative	9 July 1923	6 April 2022	Birmingham Edgbaston	1966, 1970, 1974 I & II, 1979, 1983, 1987, 1992
Alice Mahon	Labour	28 September 1937	25 December 2022	Halifax	1987, 1992, 1997, 2001
Anna McCurley	Conservative	18 January 1943	31 October 2022	Renfrew West and Inverclyde	1983
William Powell	Conservative	3 August 1948	23 March 2022	Corby	1983, 1987, 1992
Giles Radice, Baron Radice	Labour	4 October 1936	25 August 2022	Chester-le-Street North Durham	1973 (by-election), 1974 I & II, 1979 1983, 1987, 1992, 1997
Peter Rost	Conservative	19 September 1930	8 September 2022	South East Derbyshire Erewash	1970, 1974 I & II, 1979 1983, 1987
David Shaw	Conservative	14 November 1950	23 August 2022	Dover	1987, 1992
Sir Richard Shepherd	Conservative	6 December 1942	19 February 2022	Aldridge-Brownhills	1979, 1983, 1987, 1992, 1997, 2001, 2005, 2010
Jim Sheridan	Labour	24 November 1952	23 September 2022	West Renfrewshire Paisley and Renfrewshire North	2001 2005, 2010
David Trimble, Baron Trimble	Ulster Unionist	15 October 1944	25 July 2022	Upper Bann	1990 (by-election), 1992, 1997, 2001

== 2023 ==
Individual	Party	Born	Died	Constituency(ies) represented	Election(s) won
Janet Anderson	Labour	6 December 1949	6 February 2023	Rossendale and Darwen	1992, 1997, 2001, 2005
Sir Tom Arnold	Conservative	25 January 1947	14 November 2023	Hazel Grove	1974 II, 1979, 1983, 1987, 1992
Gerry Bermingham	Labour	20 August 1940	2 August 2023	St Helens South	1983, 1987, 1992, 1997
Sir Nicholas Bonsor	Conservative	9 December 1942	21 March 2023	Nantwich Upminster	1979 1983, 1987, 1992
Betty Boothroyd, Baroness Boothroyd	Speaker (Note: Served as a Labour MP from 1973–1992)	8 October 1929	26 February 2023	West Bromwich West Bromwich West	1973 (by-election) 1974 I & II, 1979, 1983, 1987, 1992, 1997
Peter Brand	Liberal Democrats	16 May 1947	22 September 2023	Isle of Wight	1997
Peter Brooke, Baron Brooke of Sutton Mandeville	Conservative	3 March 1934	13 May 2023	Cities of London and Westminster	1977 (by-election), 1979, 1983, 1987, 1992, 1997
Stanley Clinton-Davis, Baron Clinton-Davis	Labour	6 December 1928	11 June 2023	Hackney Central	1970, 1974 I & II, 1979
Ann Clwyd	Labour	21 March 1937	21 July 2023	Cynon Valley	1984 (by-election), 1987, 1992, 1997, 2001, 2005, 2010, 2015, 2017
James Cran	Conservative	28 January 1944	c. 1 June 2023	Beverley Beverley and Holderness	1987, 1992 1997, 2001
John Cockcroft	Conservative	6 July 1934	25 April 2023	Nantwich	1974 I & II
Brian Cotter, Baron Cotter	Liberal Democrats	24 August 1936	14 November 2023	Weston-super-Mare	1997, 2001
James Couchman	Conservative	11 February 1942	16 November 2023	Gillingham	1983, 1987, 1992
Alistair Darling, Baron Darling of Roulanish	Labour	28 November 1953	30 November 2023	Edinburgh Central Edinburgh South West	1987, 1992, 1997, 2001 2005, 2010
James Douglas-Hamilton, Baron Selkirk of Douglas	Conservative	31 July 1942	28 November 2023	Edinburgh West	1974 II, 1979, 1983, 1987, 1992
Harold Elletson	Conservative	8 December 1960	23 June 2023	Blackpool North	1992
Winnie Ewing	Scottish National Party	10 July 1929	21 June 2023	Hamilton Moray and Nairn	1967 (by-election) 1974 I & II
Christopher Hawkins	Conservative	26 November 1937	11 November 2023	High Peak	1983, 1987
Alan Hurst	Labour	2 September 1945	31 January 2023	Braintree	1997, 2001
Glenda Jackson	Labour	9 May 1936	15 June 2023	Hampstead and Highgate Hampstead and Kilburn	1992, 1997, 2001, 2005 2010
Robert Key	Conservative	22 April 1945	3 February 2023	Salisbury	1983, 1987, 1992, 1997, 2001, 2005
Nigel Lawson, Baron Lawson of Blaby	Conservative	11 March 1932	3 April 2023	Blaby	1974 I & II, 1979, 1983, 1987
Robert Lindsay, 29th Earl of Crawford	Conservative	5 March 1927	18 March 2023	Hertford Welwyn and Hatfield	1955, 1959, 1964, 1966, 1970 1974 I
Karen Lumley	Conservative	28 March 1964	25 May 2023	Redditch	2010, 2015
Edmund Marshall	Labour	31 May 1940	5 October 2023	Goole	1971 (by-election), 1974 I & II, 1979
John Morris, Baron Morris of Aberavon	Labour	5 November 1931	5 June 2023	Aberavon	1959, 1964, 1966, 1970, 1974 I & II, 1979, 1983, 1987, 1992, 1997
Doug Naysmith	Labour	1 April 1941	2 July 2023	Bristol North West	1997, 2001, 2005
Tom Pendry, Baron Pendry	Labour	10 June 1934	26 February 2023	Stalybridge and Hyde	1970, 1974 I & II, 1979, 1983, 1987, 1992, 1997
Roy Roebuck	Labour	25 September 1929	17 December 2023	Harrow East	1966
Allan Rogers	Labour	24 October 1932	28 November 2023	Rhondda	1983, 1987, 1992, 1997
Sir Derek Spencer	Conservative	31 March 1936	19 May 2023	Leicester South Brighton Pavilion	1983 1992
Lewis Stevens	Conservative	13 April 1936	15 January 2023	Nuneaton	1983, 1987
David Wilshire	Conservative	16 September 1943	31 October 2023	Spelthorne	1987, 1992, 1997, 2001, 2005

== 2024 ==
Individual	Party	Born	Died	Constituency(ies) represented	Election(s) won
Michael Ancram, 13th Marquess of Lothian, Baron Kerr of Monteviot	Conservative	7 July 1945	1 October 2024	Berwick and East Lothian Edinburgh South Devizes	1974 I 1979, 1983 1992, 1997, 2001, 2005
Andrew Bennett	Labour	9 March 1939	15 December 2024	Stockport North Denton and Reddish	1974 I & II, 1979 1983, 1987, 1992, 1997, 2001
Colin Breed	Liberal Democrats	4 May 1947	9 May 2024	South East Cornwall	1997, 2001, 2005
Sir Graham Bright	Conservative	2 April 1942	19 January 2024	Luton East Luton South	1979 1983, 1987, 1992
Ronnie Campbell	Labour	14 August 1943	23 February 2024	Blyth Valley	1987, 1992, 1997, 2001, 2005, 2010, 2015, 2017
John Cartwright	Social Democratic Party (Note: Served as a Labour MP from 1974–1981, then as an SDP MP from 1981–1988. After refusing to join the newly formed Liberal Democrats in 1988, he served as a 'Continuing' SDP MP from 1988–1990, then finally sat as an independent from 1990–1992.)	29 November 1933	18 November 2024	Woolwich East Woolwich	1974 II, 1979 1983, 1987
Patrick Cormack, Baron Cormack	Conservative	18 May 1939	25 February 2024	Cannock South West Staffordshire South Staffordshire	1970 1974 I & II, 1979 1983, 1987, 1992, 1997, 2001, 2005
Terry Davis	Labour	5 January 1938	9 December 2024	Bromsgrove Birmingham Stechford Birmingham Hodge Hill	1971 (by-election) 1979 1983, 1987, 1992, 1997, 2001
Ken Eastham	Labour	11 August 1927	21 July 2024	Manchester Blackley	1979, 1983, 1987, 1992
Frank Field, Baron Field of Birkenhead	Labour (Note: Sat as Birkenhead Social Justice Party in 2019)	16 July 1942	23 April 2024	Birkenhead	1979, 1983, 1987, 1992, 1997, 2001, 2005, 2010, 2015, 2017
Harry Greenway	Conservative	4 October 1934	18 January 2024	Ealing North	1979, 1983, 1987, 1992
Richard Hickmet	Conservative	1 December 1947	10 September 2024	Glanford and Scunthorpe	1983
Maureen Hicks	Conservative	23 February 1948	13 February 2024	Wolverhampton North East	1987
Sir Peter Hordern	Conservative	18 April 1929	18 April 2024	Horsham Horsham and Crawley	1964, 1966, 1970, 1983, 1987, 1992 1974 I & II, 1979
Doug Hoyle, Baron Hoyle	Labour	17 February 1926	6 April 2024	Nelson and Colne Warrington Warrington North	1974 II 1981 (by-election) 1983, 1987, 1992
Sir Tony Lloyd (in office)	Labour	25 February 1950	17 January 2024	Stretford Manchester Central Rochdale	1983, 1987, 1992 1997, 2001, 2005, 2010 2017, 2019
David Marquand	Labour	20 September 1934	23 April 2024	Ashfield	1966, 1970, 1974 I & II
Tommy McAvoy, Baron McAvoy	Labour	14 December 1943	8 March 2024	Glasgow Rutherglen Rutherglen and Hamilton West	1987, 1992, 1997, 2001 2005
Sir John Nott	Conservative	1 February 1932	6 November 2024	St Ives	1966, 1970, 1974 I & II, 1979
Sir Geoffrey Pattie	Conservative	17 January 1936	8 October 2024	Chertsey and Walton	1974 I & II, 1979, 1983, 1987, 1992
John Prescott, Baron Prescott	Labour	31 May 1938	20 November 2024	Kingston upon Hull East	1970, 1974 I & II, 1979, 1983, 1987, 1992, 1997, 2001, 2005
Alex Salmond	Scottish National	31 December 1954	12 October 2024	Banff and Buchan Gordon	1987, 1992, 1997, 2001, 2005 2015
Sir Colin Shepherd	Conservative	13 January 1938	17 January 2024	Hereford	1974 II, 1979, 1983, 1987, 1992
Andrew Stunell, Baron Stunell	Liberal Democrats	24 November 1942	29 April 2024	Hazel Grove	1997, 2001, 2005, 2010
Richard Taylor	Health Concern	7 July 1934	26 June 2024	Wyre Forest	2001, 2005
Roy Thomason	Conservative	14 December 1944	16 October 2024	Bromsgrove	1992
John Tomlinson, Baron Tomlinson	Labour	1 August 1939	20 January 2024	Meriden	1974 I & II
Delwyn Williams	Conservative	1 November 1938	22 August 2024	Montgomeryshire	1979

== 2025 ==
Individual	Party	Born	Died	Constituency(ies) represented	Election(s) won
Tim Boswell, Baron Boswell of Aynho	Conservative	2 December 1942	30 August 2025	Daventry	1987, 1992, 1997, 2001, 2005
Dame Annette Brooke	Liberal Democrats	7 June 1947	20 August 2025	Mid Dorset and North Poole	2001, 2005, 2010
Menzies Campbell, Baron Campbell of Pittenweem	Liberal Democrats	22 May 1941	26 September 2025	North East Fife	1987, 1992, 1997, 2001, 2005, 2010
Iain Coleman	Labour	18 January 1958	20 September 2025	Hammersmith and Fulham	1997, 2001
Oliver Colvile	Conservative	26 August 1959	20 October 2025	Plymouth Sutton and Devonport	2010, 2015
Lawrence Cunliffe	Labour	25 March 1929	7 February 2025	Leigh	1979, 1983, 1987, 1992, 1997
Quentin Davies, Baron Davies of Stamford	Labour (Note: Served as a Conservative MP from 1987–2007)	29 May 1944	13 January 2025	Stamford and Spalding Grantham and Stamford	1987, 1992 1997, 2001, 2005
Dafydd Elis-Thomas, Baron Elis-Thomas	Plaid Cymru	18 October 1946	7 February 2025	Merioneth Meirionnydd Nant Conwy	1974 I & II, 1979 1983, 1987
Mark Fisher	Labour	29 October 1944	16 November 2025	Stoke-on-Trent Central	1983, 1987, 1992, 1997, 2001, 2005
Roger Freeman, Baron Freeman	Conservative	27 May 1942	2 June 2025	Kettering	1983, 1987, 1992
Barry Henderson	Conservative	29 April 1936	14 November 2025	East Dunbartonshire East Fife North East Fife	1974 I 1979 1983
Terence Higgins, Baron Higgins	Conservative	18 January 1928	25 November 2025	Worthing	1964, 1966, 1970, 1974 I & II, 1979, 1983, 1987, 1992
Alan Howarth, Baron Howarth of Newport	Labour (Note: Served as a Conservative MP from 1983–1995)	11 June 1944	10 September 2025	Stratford-on-Avon Newport East	1983, 1987, 1992 1997, 2001
Sir David Knox	Conservative	30 May 1933	14 September 2025	Leek Staffordshire Moorlands	1970, 1974 I & II, 1979 1983, 1987, 1992
Sir Mark Lennox-Boyd	Conservative	4 May 1943	24 July 2025	Morecambe and Lonsdale Morecambe and Lunesdale	1979 1983, 1987, 1992
John Marshall	Conservative	19 August 1940	3 November 2025	Hendon South	1987, 1992
John Maxton, Baron Maxton	Labour	5 May 1936	20 November 2025	Glasgow Cathcart	1979, 1983, 1987, 1992, 1997
Sir Patrick McNair-Wilson	Conservative	28 May 1929	4 December 2025	Lewisham West New Forest	1964 1968 (by-election), 1970, 1974 I & II, 1979, 1983, 1987, 1992
Sir Bill O'Brien	Labour	25 January 1929	18 May 2025	Normanton	1983, 1987, 1992, 1997, 2001
Sally Oppenheim-Barnes, Baroness Oppenheim-Barnes	Conservative	26 July 1928	1 January 2025	Gloucester	1970, 1974 I & II, 1979, 1983
Colin Pickthall	Labour	13 September 1944	27 December 2025	West Lancashire	1992, 1997, 2001
Sir George Reid	Scottish National	4 June 1939	12 August 2025	Clackmannan and Eastern Stirlingshire	1974 I & II
Fred Silvester	Conservative	20 September 1933	5 July 2025	Walthamstow West Manchester Withington	1967 (by-election) 1974 I & II, 1979, 1983
Martin Smyth	Ulster Unionist	15 June 1931	22 August 2025	Belfast South	1982 (by-election), 1983, 1987, 1992, 1997, 2001
Sir John Stanley	Conservative	19 January 1942	28 November 2025	Tonbridge and Malling	1974 I & II, 1979, 1983, 1987, 1992, 1997, 2001, 2005, 2010
Dick Taverne, Baron Taverne	Democratic Labour	18 October 1928	25 October 2025	Lincoln	1962 (by-election), 1964, 1966, 1970, 1974 I
Norman Tebbit, Baron Tebbit	Conservative	29 March 1931	7 July 2025	Epping Chingford	1970 1974 I & II, 1979, 1983, 1987
David Warburton	Conservative	28 October 1965	26 August 2025	Somerton and Frome	2015, 2017, 2019

== 2026 ==
Individual	Party	Born	Died	Constituency(ies) represented	Election(s) won
Jeffrey Archer, Baron Archer of Weston-super-Mare	Conservative	15 April 1940	5 October 2026	Louth	1969 (by-election), 1970, 1974 I
Harry Barnes	Labour	22 July 1936	16 February 2026	North East Derbyshire	1987, 1992, 1997, 2001
Mickey Brady	Sinn Féin	7 October 1950	16 January 2026	Newry and Armagh	2015, 2017, 2019
Derek Conway	Conservative	15 February 1953	4 May 2026	Shrewsbury and Atcham Old Bexley and Sidcup	1983, 1987, 1992 2001, 2005
James Craigen	Labour	2 August 1938	4 April 2026	Glasgow Maryhill	1974 I & II, 1979, 1983
Bryan Davies, Baron Davies of Oldham	Labour	9 November 1939	27 October 2026	Enfield North Oldham Central and Royton	1974 I & II 1992
Sir Patrick Duffy	Labour	17 June 1920	2 January 2026	Colne Valley Sheffield Attercliffe	1963 (by-election), 1964 1970, 1974 I & II, 1979, 1983, 1987
Sir David Evennett	Conservative	3 June 1949	16 November 2026	Erith and Crayford Bexleyheath and Crayford	1983, 1987, 1992 2005, 2010, 2015, 2017, 2019
Howard Flight, Baron Flight	Conservative	16 June 1948	24 January 2026	Arundel and South Downs	1997, 2001
Patrick Ground	Conservative	9 August 1932	7 April 2026	Feltham and Heston	1983, 1987
Joan Hall	Conservative	31 August 1935	27 January 2026	Keighley	1970
Sir Jeremy Hanley	Conservative	17 November 1945	22 May 2026	Richmond and Barnes	1983, 1987, 1992
Sir John Hannam	Conservative	2 August 1929	8 October 2026	Exeter	1970, 1974 I & II, 1979, 1983, 1987, 1992
Alan Haselhurst, Baron Haselhurst	Conservative	23 June 1937	1 June 2026	Middleton and Prestwich Saffron Walden	1970 1977 (by-election), 1979, 1983, 1987, 1992, 1997, 2001, 2005, 2010, 2015
Roy Hattersley, Baron Hattersley	Labour	28 December 1932	13 June 2026	Birmingham Sparkbrook	1964, 1966, 1970, 1974 I & II, 1979, 1983, 1987, 1992
Stuart Holland	Labour	25 March 1940	2026	Vauxhall	1979, 1983, 1987
John Horam, Baron Horam	Conservative (Note: Served as a Labour MP from 1970–1981 and a Social Democratic MP from 1981–1983)	7 March 1939	24 July 2026	Gateshead West Orpington	1970, 1974 I & II, 1979 1992, 1997, 2001, 2005
Sir George Howarth	Labour	29 June 1949	3 July 2026	Knowsley North Knowsley North and Sefton East Knowsley	1986 (by-election), 1987, 1992 1997, 2001, 2005 2010, 2015, 2017, 2019
Andy King	Labour	14 September 1948	12 October 2026	Rugby and Kenilworth	1997, 2001
Terry Lewis	Labour	29 December 1935	20 July 2026	Worsley	1983, 1987, 1992, 1997, 2001
Michael Meadowcroft	Liberal	6 March 1942	1 June 2026	Leeds West	1983
John Pardoe	Liberal	27 July 1934	15 November 2026	North Cornwall	1966, 1970, 1974 I & II
Peter Snape, Baron Snape	Labour	12 February 1942	13 August 2026	West Bromwich East	1974 I & II, 1979, 1983, 1987, 1992, 1997
Sir Neville Trotter	Conservative	27 January 1932	25 June 2026	Tynemouth	1974 I & II, 1979, 1983, 1987, 1992
Jim Wallace, Baron Wallace of Tankerness	Liberal Democrats (Note: Served as a Liberal MP from 1983–1988)	25 August 1954	29 January 2026	Orkney and Shetland	1983, 1987, 1992, 1997
Ken Weetch	Labour	17 September 1933	5 February 2026	Ipswich	1974 II, 1979, 1983
Frank White	Labour	11 November 1939	November 2026	Bury and Radcliffe	1974 II, 1979
Ann Widdecombe	Conservative	4 October 1947	8 July 2026	Maidstone Maidstone and The Weald	1987, 1992 1997, 2001, 2005
David Winnick	Labour	26 June 1933	25 March 2026	Croydon South Walsall North	1966 1979, 1983, 1987, 1992, 1997, 2001, 2005, 2010, 2015
Phil Woolas	Labour	11 December 1959	14 March 2026	Oldham East and Saddleworth	1997, 2001, 2005, 2010
Tony Worthington	Labour	11 October 1941	20 April 2026	Clydebank and Milngavie	1987, 1992, 1997, 2001

== See also ==
- List of United Kingdom MPs who died in the 1990s
- List of United Kingdom MPs who died in the 2000s
- List of United Kingdom MPs who died in the 2010s
