= 1976 Cambridge by-election =

By-election in England

The 1976 Cambridge by-election of 2 December 1976 was held after Conservative Member of Parliament (MP) David Lane resigned his seat to take up the position of Chairman of the Commission for Racial Equality. The seat was retained by the Tories in a result that cut the government majority to one seat.

== Candidates ==
- Michael O'Loughlin had been the Liberal candidate for the same seat in the general elections of 1964, 1966, February 1974 and October 1974. He had not contested the seat at either the 1967 Cambridge by-election, or the 1970 general election. This was his fifth and last candidature for the seat.
- Robert Rhodes James was a noted historian and a former winner of the John Llewellyn Rhys Prize.
- Philip Sargent stood under the title "Science Fiction Looney".
- Jeremy Wotherspoon was an estate agent and former shop steward for the Transport and General Workers' Union. He had contested Watford for the National Front in the two general elections of 1974. He was a candidate for the British National Party in the 2009 European election in the South West England constituency.

== Result of the by-election ==
The result of the by-election was as follows:

The Conservative Party held the seat with a significantly increased majority.

United Kingdom Parliament: Cambridge by-election 1976
Party	Candidate	Votes	%	±%
Conservative	Robert Rhodes James	19,620	51.03	+9.78
Labour	Martin Smith	9,995	25.99	−10.01
Liberal	Michael O'Loughlin	7,051	18.34	−2.73
Independent	James Sharpe	711	1.85	N/A
National Front	Jeremy Wotherspoon	700	1.82	N/A
Science Fiction Looney	Philip Sargent	374	0.97	N/A
Majority		9,625	25.03	+19.78
Turnout		38,451		
Conservative hold		Swing		

== Result of the previous general election ==
Result from the previous general election was:

General election October 1974: Cambridge
Party	Candidate	Votes	%	±%
Conservative	David Lane	21,790	41.25	+0.66
Labour	James Curran	19,017	36.0	+3.28
Liberal	Michael O'Loughlin	11,129	21.07	−5.00
United Democratic Party	C.J. Curry	885	1.68	N/A
Majority		2,773	5.25	−2.62
Turnout		52,811	69.55	−9.22
Conservative hold		Swing	-1.3	
