= Robert Davies (politician) =

British Labour Party politician (1918–1967)

Member of Parliament for Cambridge
- In office 31 March 1966 – 16 June 1967

Personal details
- Born: 7 May 1918
- Died: 16 June 1967 (aged 49)
- Party: Labour
- Spouse: Katherine Wing

Robert Malcolm Deryck Davies, OBE (7 May 1918 – 16 June 1967) was a British Labour Party politician.

== Early and personal life ==
Davies was educated at Reading School, and London and Oxford Universities.

From 1949 until his election to Parliament he was secretary of the Department of Applied Economics at Cambridge University.

He was also a Labour member of Cambridge City Council for East Chesterton ward from 1954 to 1964.

In 1941 he married Katharine Wing; the couple had no children.

Descended from a Welsh farming family, his grandfather, Jenkin Davies (1824–1893), was a leading Berkshire agriculturalist and County Councillor. The Davies Family History website has details of his pedigree.

== Political career ==
At the 1966 general election, Davies was elected member of Parliament for Cambridge, winning the seat by just 991 votes from the Conservatives at his third attempt, after the retirement of Hamilton Kerr. He had previously contested the seat in the general elections of 1959 and 1964, and also contested the surrounding seat of Cambridgeshire during a 1961 by-election. Regarded as being on the left of the party, he was an opponent of the government's policy on Vietnam, and joined other Labour members in signing a letter supporting a peace march organised by the Campaign for Nuclear Disarmament.

== Death ==
Davies was admitted to Addenbrooke Hospital, Cambridge, in May 1967 for 'a complete rest and observation', but suffered a heart attack and died a month later, only fifteen months after being elected, aged 49.

The resulting by-election for his seat was won by the Conservative candidate, David Lane.

Parliament of the United Kingdom
Preceded by Hamilton Kerr	Member of Parliament for Cambridge; 1966 – 1967	Succeeded by David Lane
