= Robert Rhodes James =

British historian and Conservative politician

Sir Robert Vidal Rhodes James (10 April 1933 – 20 May 1999) was a British historian and Conservative Member of Parliament. Born in India, he was educated in England and attended the University of Oxford. From 1955 to 1964, he was a clerk of the House of Commons. He meanwhile wrote a number of biographical and historical books. He then moved to academia and had been elected a Fellow of All Souls College, Oxford in 1965. He was Director of the Institute for the Study of International Organisation at the University of Sussex (1968–1973) and then Principal Officer in the Executive Office of the Secretary General of the United Nations (1973–1976). He moved from behind the scenes by being elected Member of Parliament (MP) for Cambridge in the 1976 by-election. He spent most of his parliamentary career on the backbenches, apart from serving as a Parliamentary Private Secretary at the Foreign Office (1979–1982). He was knighted in 1991 and stepped down as an MP the following year. During his time as an MP, he continued to publish multiple books and maintained his academic standing through visiting professorships and his Oxford fellowship.

From 1991 to his death, he was a Fellow of Wolfson College, Cambridge.

== Family and early life ==
Rhodes James was born in India as the third son of Colonel William James and Violet (Rhodes) James. His father's cousin was the ghost-story writer M. R. James and the family had links to clergy, lawyers, diplomats, soldiers and sailors who had served across the British Empire. Two older brothers, William and Richard, served in Burma with the Gurkhas and later became schoolteachers. Richard produced several books, including Chindit which chronicled his wartime experiences.

His sister, Iris, also became a writer, as an historian and translator of Gaelic and Assamese folk tales. Having begun his education in private schools in India, Rhodes James travelled to England to attend Sedbergh School and then Worcester College, Oxford. In 1956, he married Angela Robertson. They had four daughters.

== Early career ==
Between 1955 and 1964, Rhodes James worked in the Clerk's Department of the House of Commons, first as a Clerk and then, from 1961, as a Senior Clerk. During this time, his first book, a biography of Lord Randolph Churchill, was published in 1959. His next book, An Introduction to the House of Commons (1961) was awarded the John Llewellyn Rhys Prize. He wrote Rosebery (1964), a biography of Archibald Primrose, 5th Earl of Rosebery and Gallipoli (published 1965), a reappraisal of the ill-fated Gallipoli Campaign. He then became a fellow of All Souls College in Oxford. There, having left his Commons post in 1964, he engaged full-time in researching the papers of J. C. C. Davidson from 1965 to 1968.

In 1968, he became Director of the Institute for the Study of International Organisation at the University of Sussex, before moving to work as Principal Officer in the Executive Office of the then Secretary General of the United Nations, Kurt Waldheim, in 1973. While at Sussex, he wrote a revisionist biography of Winston Churchill's years between 1900 and 1939 which argued that there were substantial reasons for Churchill's judgement to be questioned by his contemporaries. He also edited eight volumes of Churchill's speeches (published 1974).

== Member of Parliament ==
In 1976, Rhodes James became a Conservative Member of Parliament after winning the by-election for the marginal seat of Cambridge vacated by David Lane. Despite strong challenges from the Social Democratic Party in the subsequent 1983 and 1987 general elections, he held the seat until his retirement at the 1992 general election.

A self-described moderate one-nation Tory, Rhodes James's views found little favour with Conservative leader Margaret Thatcher and he never progressed beyond the post of Parliamentary Private Secretary at the Foreign Office. He came to resent his lack of promotion and, using the subtitle of his Churchill biography, dubbed his political career "a study in failure". He was knighted in 1991.

== After Westminster ==
After standing down from Parliament in 1992, he held several visiting professorships at American universities before his death, aged 66, in 1999.

== Works ==
Among his works written and published while an MP, Rhodes James wrote two more highly praised biographies, both with official and exclusive access to private papers: Anthony Eden (1986), a sympathetic biography of the former prime minister; and Robert Boothby: A Portrait of Churchill's Ally (1991), an account of the life of the maverick backbencher.

However, several of his biographies, and particularly his edition of the diaries of Sir Henry 'Chips' Channon, have been criticised for suppressing their subject's homosexuality or bisexuality.

- Lord Randolph Churchill (1959)
- Introduction to the House of Commons (1961)
- Rosebery: A Biography of Archibald Philip, Fifth Earl of Rosebery (1964)
- Gallipoli (1965)
- Chips: The Diaries of Sir Henry Channon (editor; 1967)
- Standardization and Common Production of Weapons in NATO (1967)
- Suez Ten Years After (contributor; 1967)
- Essays from Divers Hands (contributor; 1967)
- Memoirs of a Conservative: J.C.C. Davidson's Memoirs and Papers, 1910–37 (editor; 1969)
- Churchill: Four Faces and the Man (contributing editor; 1969)
- Churchill: A Study in Failure, 1900–1939 (1970)
- Staffing the United Nations Secretariat (1970)
- United Nations (1970)
- International Administration (contributor; 1971)
- Ambitions and Realities; British Politics, 1964–70 (1972)
- Winston S. Churchill: His Complete Speeches 1897–1963 (editor; 1974, in eight volumes)
- The Prime Ministers, Volume II (contributor; 1975)
- The British Revolution: British Politics, 1880–1939 (1976; originally published in two volumes, later reprinted as one)
- Victor Cazalet: A Portrait (1976)
- Britain's Role in the United Nations (1977)
- Albert, Prince Consort: A Biography (1983)
- Anthony Eden (1986)
- Robert Boothby: A Portrait of Churchill's Ally (1991)
- Henry Wellcome (1994), London: Hodder & Stoughton ISBN 978-0-340-60617-9
- A Spirit Undaunted: The Political Role of George VI (1998)

Parliament of the United Kingdom
Preceded by David Lane	Member of Parliament for Cambridge; 1976–1992	Succeeded by Anne Campbell
