= List of United Kingdom MPs who died in the 2010s =

This is a list of individuals who were former or serving members of parliament for the House of Commons of the United Kingdom who died in the 2010s.

== 2010 ==
Individual	Party	Born	Died	Constituency(ies) represented	Election(s) won
Albert Booth	Labour	28 May 1928	6 February 2010	Barrow and Furness	1966, 1970, 1974 I & II, 1979
Tom Ellis	Labour	15 March 1924	14 April 2010	Wrexham	1970, 1974 I & II, 1979
Michael Foot	Labour	23 July 1913	3 March 2010	Plymouth Devonport Ebbw Vale Bleanau Gwent	1945, 1950, 1951 1960 (by-election), 1964, 1966, 1970, 1974 I & II, 1979 1983, 1987
Denzil Freeth	Conservative	10 July 1924	26 April 2010	Basingstoke	1955, 1959
Sir John Gorst	Conservative	28 June 1928	31 July 2010	Hendon North	1970, 1974 I & II, 1979, 1983, 1987, 1992
Sir Geoffrey Johnson-Smith	Conservative	16 April 1924	11 August 2010	Holborn and St Pancras South East Grinstead Wealden	1959 1965 (by-election), 1966, 1970, 1974 I & II, 1979, 1983, 1987, 1992, 1997
Ashok Kumar (in office)	Labour	28 May 1956	15 March 2010	Langbaurgh Middlesbrough South and East Cleveland	1991 (by-election) 1997, 2001, 2005
Richard Livsey, Baron Livsey of Talgarth	Liberal Democrats	2 May 1935	16 September 2010	Brecon and Radnorshire	1985 (by-election), 1987, 1997
Nicholas Lyell, Baron Lyell of Markyate	Conservative	6 December 1938	30 August 2010	Hemel Hempstead Mid Bedfordshire North East Bedfordshire	1979 1983, 1987, 1992 1997
Edward Lyons	Labour	17 May 1926	23 April 2010	Bradford East Bradford West	1966, 1970 1974 I & II, 1979
Sir Robin Maxwell-Hyslop	Conservative	6 June 1931	13 January 2010	Tiverton	1960 (by-election), 1964, 1966, 1970, 1974 I & II, 1979, 1983, 1987
Dame Angela Rumbold	Conservative	11 August 1932	19 June 2010	Mitcham and Morden	1982 (by-election), 1983, 1987, 1992
Sir Cyril Smith	Liberal	28 June 1928	3 September 2010	Rochdale	1972 (by-election), 1974 I & II, 1979, 1983, 1987
Winston Spencer-Churchill	Conservative	10 October 1940	2 March 2010	Stretford Davyhulme	1970, 1974 I & II, 1979 1983, 1987, 1992
William Thompson	Ulster Unionist	26 October 1939	12 December 2010	West Tyrone	1997
Sydney Tierney	Labour	16 September 1923	6 March 2010	Birmingham Yardley	1974 I & II
Rudi Vis	Labour	4 April 1941	30 May 2010	Finchley and Golders Green	1997, 2001, 2005
Peter Walker, Baron Walker of Worcester	Conservative	25 March 1932	23 June 2010	Worcester	1961 (by-election), 1964, 1966, 1970, 1974 I & II, 1979, 1983, 1987
Sir John Ward	Conservative	8 March 1925	26 June 2010	Poole	1979, 1983, 1987, 1992
William Wilson	Labour	28 June 1913	18 August 2010	Coventry South Coventry South East	1964, 1966, 1970 1974 I & II, 1979
William Yates	Conservative	15 September 1921	18 April 2010	The Wrekin	1955, 1959, 1964

== 2011 ==
Individual	Party	Born	Died	Constituency(ies) represented	Election(s) won
James Allason	Conservative	6 September 1912	16 June 2011	Hemel Hempstead	1959, 1964, 1966, 1970, 1974 I
Terence Boston, Baron Boston of Faversham	Labour	21 March 1930	23 July 2011	Faversham	1964, 1966
David Cairns (in office)	Labour	7 August 1966	9 May 2011	Greenock and Inverclyde Inverclyde	2001 2005, 2010
William Craig	Vanguard	2 December 1924	25 April 2011	Belfast East	1974 I & II
William Elliott, Baron Elliott of Morpeth	Conservative	11 December 1920	20 May 2011	Newcastle upon Tyne North	1957 (by-election), 1959, 1964, 1966, 1970, 1974 I & II, 1979
Phil Gallie	Conservative	3 June 1939	24 January 2011	Ayr	1992
Antony Gardner	Labour	27 December 1927	16 October 2011	Rushcliffe	1966
Brian Harrison	Conservative	3 October 1921	21 August 2011	Maldon	1955, 1959, 1964, 1966, 1970
Sir Philip Holland	Conservative	14 March 1917	2 June 2011	Acton Carlton Gedling	1959, 1966, 1970, 1974 I & II, 1979 1983
Alan Keen (in office)	Labour	25 November 1937	10 November 2011	Feltham and Heston	1992, 1997, 2001, 2005, 2010
Robert Litherland	Labour	23 June 1930	13 May 2011	Manchester Central	1979 (by-election), 1983, 1987, 1992
Richard Marsh, Baron Marsh	Labour	14 March 1928	29 July 2011	Greenwich	1959, 1964, 1966, 1970
Sir Timothy Raison	Conservative	3 November 1929	3 November 2011	Aylesbury	1970, 1974 I & II, 1979, 1983, 1987
Caerwyn Roderick	Labour	15 July 1927	16 October 2011	Brecon and Radnor	1970, 1974 I & II
Iain Sproat	Conservative	8 November 1938	29 September 2011	Aberdeen South Harwich	1970, 1974 I & II, 1979 1992
Jack Thompson	Labour	27 August 1928	21 July 2011	Wansbeck	1983, 1987, 1992
Alec Woodall	Labour	20 September 1918	3 January 2011	Hemsworth	1974 I & II, 1979, 1983

== 2012 ==
Individual	Party	Born	Died	Constituency(ies) represented	Election(s) won
Peter Archer, Baron Archer of Sandwell	Labour	20 November 1926	14 June 2012	Rowley Regis and Tipton Warley West	1966, 1970 1974 I & II, 1979, 1983, 1987
Jack Ashley, Baron Ashley of Stoke	Labour	6 December 1922	20 April 2012	Stoke-on-Trent South	1966, 1970, 1974 I & II, 1979, 1983, 1987
David Atkinson	Conservative	24 March 1940	23 January 2012	Bournemouth East	1977 (by-election), 1979, 1983, 1987, 1992, 1997, 2001
Gordon Bagier	Labour	7 July 1924	8 April 2012	Sunderland South	1964, 1966, 1970, 1974 I & II, 1979, 1983
Sir Stuart Bell (in office)	Labour	16 May 1938	13 October 2012	Middlesbrough	1983, 1987, 1992, 1997, 2001, 2005, 2010
Sir Rhodes Boyson	Conservative	11 May 1925	28 August 2012	Brent North	1974 I & II, 1979, 1983, 1987, 1992
Robert Carr, Baron Carr of Hadley	Conservative	11 November 1916	17 February 2012	Mitcham Carshalton	1950, 1951, 1955, 1959, 1964, 1966, 1970 1974 I & II
Henry Clark	Ulster Unionist	11 April 1929	24 March 2012	Antrim North	1959, 1964, 1966
Frank Cook	Labour	14 December 1926	10 January 2012	Stockton North	1983, 1987, 1992, 1997, 2001, 2005
Robin Corbett, Baron Corbett of Castle Vale	Labour	22 September 1933	19 February 2012	Hemel Hempstead Birmingham Erdington	1974 I & II 1983, 1987, 1992, 1997
Alex Eadie	Labour	23 June 1920	26 January 2012	Midlothian	1966, 1970, 1974 I & II, 1979, 1983, 1987
Edward Short, Baron Glenamara	Labour	17 December 1912	4 May 2012	Newcastle upon Tyne Central	1951, 1955, 1959, 1964, 1966, 1970, 1974 I & II
Donald Gorrie	Liberal Democrats	2 April 1933	25 August 2012	Edinburgh West	1997
Ken Hargreaves	Conservative	1 March 1939	23 June 2012	Hyndburn	1983, 1987
Walter Harrison	Labour	2 January 1921	19 October 2012	Wakefield	1964, 1966, 1970, 1974 I & II, 1979, 1983
Emlyn Hooson, Baron Hooson	Liberal	26 March 1925	21 February 2012	Montgomeryshire	1962 (by-election), 1964, 1966, 1970, 1974 I & II
Alan Hopkins	Conservative and National Liberal	27 October 1926	12 November 2012	Bristol North East	1959, 1964
Norman St John-Stevas, Baron St John of Fawsley	Conservative	18 May 1929	2 March 2012	Chelmsford	1964, 1966, 1970, 1974 I & II, 1979, 1983
Geoffrey Lofthouse, Baron Lofthouse of Pontefract	Labour	18 December 1925	1 November 2012	Pontefract and Castleford	1978 (by-election), 1979, 1983, 1987, 1992
John Maples, Baron Maples	Conservative	22 April 1943	9 June 2012	Lewisham West Stratford-on-Avon	1983, 1987 1997, 2001, 2005
Alf Morris, Baron Morris of Manchester	Labour	23 March 1928	12 August 2012	Manchester Wythenshawe	1964, 1966, 1970, 1974 I & II, 1979, 1983, 1987, 1992
Charles Morris	Labour	14 December 1926	8 January 2012	Manchester Openshaw	1963 (by-election), 1964, 1966, 1970, 1974 I & II, 1979
Tony Newton, Baron Newton of Braintree	Conservative	29 August 1937	25 March 2012	Braintree	1974 I & II, 1979, 1983, 1987, 1992
Sir Irvine Patnick	Conservative	11 October 1929	30 December 2012	Sheffield Hallam	1987, 1992
Stuart Randall, Baron Randall of St Budeaux	Labour	22 June 1938	11 August 2012	Kingston upon Hull West	1983, 1987, 1992
Marsha Singh	Labour	11 October 1954	17 July 2012	Bradford West	1997, 2001, 2005, 2010
James Wellbeloved	Labour	29 July 1926	10 September 2012	Erith and Crayford	1965 (by-election), 1966, 1970, 1974 I & II, 1979
Michael Welsh	Labour	23 November 1926	20 January 2012	Don Valley Doncaster North	1979 1983, 1987
Sir Ray Whitney	Conservative	28 November 1930	15 August 2012	Wycombe	1978 (by-election), 1979, 1983, 1987, 1992, 1997
Malcolm Wicks (in office)	Labour	1 July 1947	29 September 2012	Croydon North West Croydon North	1992 1997, 2001, 2005, 2010
Sir Marcus Worsley	Conservative	6 April 1925	18 December 2012	Keighley Chelsea	1959 1966, 1970, 1974 I

== 2013 ==
Individual	Party	Born	Died	Constituency(ies) represented	Election(s) won
Norman Atkinson	Labour	25 March 1923	8 July 2013	Tottenham	1964, 1966, 1970, 1974 I & II, 1979, 1983
Alfred Bates (Note: Remembrance of departed colleagues.)	Labour	8 June 1944	17 December 2013	Bebington and Ellesmere Port	1974 I & II
Robert Boscawen	Conservative	17 March 1923	28 December 2013	Wells Somerton and Frome	1970, I & II, 1979 1983, 1987
Bernard Conlan (Note: BERNARD CONLAN : Obituary)	Labour	24 October 1923	12 December 2013	Gateshead East	1964, 1966, 1970, 1974 I & II, 1979, 1983
Stanley Crowther	Labour	30 May 1925	10 March 2013	Rotherham	1976, 1979, 1983, 1987
James Dickens	Labour	4 April 1931	5 April 2013	Lewisham West	1966
Peter Fraser, Baron Fraser of Carmyllie	Conservative	29 May 1945	22 June 2013	South Angus East Angus	1979 1983
John Gilbert, Baron Gilbert	Labour	5 April 1927	2 June 2013	Dudley Dudley East	1970 1974 I & II, 1979, 1983, 1987, 1992
Peter Griffiths	Conservative	24 May 1928	20 November 2013	Smethwick Portsmouth North	1964 1979, 1983, 1987, 1992
Barney Hayhoe, Baron Hayhoe	Conservative	8 August 1925	7 September 2013	Heston and Isleworth Brentford and Isleworth	1970 1974 I & II, 1979, 1983, 1987
Charles Longbottom	Conservative	22 July 1930	5 February 2013	York	1959, 1964
Helen McElhone	Labour	10 April 1933	5 June 2013	Glasgow Queen's Park	1982 (by-election)
Eddie McGrady	Social Democratic and Labour	3 June 1935	11 November 2013	South Down	1987, 1992, 1997, 2001, 2005
Allen McKay	Labour	5 February 1927	2 May 2013	Penistone Barnsley West and Penistone	1978 (by-election), 1979 1983, 1987
Bruce Millan	Labour	5 October 1927	21 February 2013	Glasgow Craigton Glasgow Govan	1959, 1964, 1966, 1970, 1974 I & II, 1979 1983, 1987
Ernle Money	Conservative	17 February 1931	14 April 2013	Ipswich	1970, 1974 I
Sir Fergus Montgomery	Conservative	25 November 1927	19 March 2013	Newcastle upon Tyne East Brierly Hill Altrincham and Sale	1959 1967 (by-election), 1970 1974 II, 1979, 1983, 1987, 1992
Sir Morgan Morgan-Giles	Conservative	19 June 1914	4 May 2013	Winchester	1964 (by-election), 1964, 1966, 1970, 1974 I & II
Donald Chapman, Baron Northfield	Labour	25 November 1923	18 April 2013	Birmingham Northfield	1951, 1955, 1959, 1964, 1966
Wilfred Proudfoot	Conservative	19 December 1921	19 July 2013	Cleveland Brighouse and Spenborough	1959 1970
Wyn Roberts, Baron Roberts of Conwy	Conservative	10 July 1930	13 December 2013	Conwy	1970, 1974 I & 1974, 1979, 1983, 1987, 1992
Tony Speller	Conservative	12 June 1929	15 February 2013	North Devon	1979, 1983, 1987
Andy Stewart	Conservative	27 May 1937	6 October 2013	Sherwood	1983, 1987
Margaret Thatcher, Baroness Thatcher	Conservative	13 October 1925	8 April 2013	Finchley	1959, 1964, 1966, 1970, 1974 I & II, 1979, 1983, 1987
Sir Cyril Townsend	Conservative	21 December 1937	20 November 2013	Bexleyheath	1974 I & II, 1979, 1983, 1987, 1992
David Watkins	Labour	27 August 1925	23 August 2013	Consett	1966, 1970, 1974 I & II, 1979
Jimmy Wray	Labour	28 April 1938	25 May 2013	Glasgow Provan Glasgow Baillieston	1987, 1992 1997, 2001
Sheila Wright	Labour	22 March 1925	5 July 2013	Birmingham Handsworth	1979

== 2014 ==
Individual	Party	Born	Died	Constituency(ies) represented	Election(s) won
Joel Barnett, Baron Barnett	Labour	14 October 1923	1 November 2014	Heywood and Royton	1964, 1966, 1970, 1974 I & II, 1979
Tony Benn	Labour	3 April 1925	14 March 2014	Bristol South East Chesterfield	1950 (by-election), 1951, 1955, 1959, 1963 (by-election), 1964, 1966, 1970, 1974 I & II, 1979 1983, 1987, 1992, 1997
Sir Bill Benyon	Conservative	17 January 1930	2 May 2014	Buckingham Milton Keynes	1970, 1974 I & II, 1979 1983, 1987
Dennis Turner, Baron Bilston	Labour	26 August 1942	25 February 2014	Wolverhampton South East	1987, 1992, 1997, 2001
Sir Sydney Chapman	Conservative	17 October 1935	9 October 2014	Birmingham Handsworth Chipping Barnet	1970 1979, 1983, 1987, 1992, 1997, 2001
Sir Chris Chataway	Conservative	31 January 1931	19 January 2014	Lewisham North Chichester	1959, 1964 1969 (by-election), 1970, February 1974
Derek Coombs	Conservative	12 August 1931	30 December 2014	Birmingham Yardley	1970
Jim Dobbin (in office)	Labour	26 May 1941	6 September 2014	Heywood and Middleton	1997, 2001, 2005, 2010
Dick Douglas	Labour (Note: From 1990, SNP)	4 January 1932	13 May 2014	Clackmannan and Eastern Stirlingshire Dunfermline Dunfermline West	1970 1979 1983, 1987
Sheila Faith	Conservative	3 June 1928	28 September 2014	Belper	1979
Dame Peggy Fenner	Conservative	12 November 1922	15 September 2014	Rochester and Chatham Medway	1970, February 1974; 1979 1983, 1987, 1992
Cecil Franks	Conservative	1 July 1935	2 February 2014	Barrow and Furness	1983, 1987
John Freeman	Labour	19 February 1915	20 December 2014	Watford	1945, 1950, 1951
Sam Galbraith	Labour	18 October 1945	18 August 2014	Strathkelvin and Bearsden	1987, 1992, 1997
Paul Goggins (in office)	Labour	16 June 1953	7 January 2014	Wythenshawe and Sale East	1997, 2001, 2005, 2010
Sir Eldon Griffiths	Conservative	25 May 1925	3 June 2014	Bury St Edmunds	1964, 1966, 1970, 1974 I & II, 1979, 1983, 1987
Dame Elaine Kellett-Bowman	Conservative	8 July 1923	4 March 2014	Lancaster	1970, 1974 I & II, 1979, 1983, 1987, 1992
Marcus Kimball, Baron Kimball	Conservative	18 October 1928	26 March 2014	Gainsborough	1956 (by-election), 1959, 1964, 1966, 1970, 1974 I & II, 1979
Sir David Mitchell	Conservative	20 June 1928	30 August 2014	Basingstoke North West Hampshire	1964, 1966, 1970, 1974 I & II, 1979 1983, 1987, 1992
Margo MacDonald	Scottish National Party	19 April 1943	4 April 2014	Glasgow Govan	1973 (by-election)
Iain MacCormick	Scottish National Party	28 September 1939	19 September 2014	Argyllshire	1974 I & II
Sir Michael Neubert	Conservative	3 September 1933	3 January 2014	Romford	1974 I & II, 1979, 1983, 1987, 1992
Ian Paisley, Baron Bannside	Democratic Unionist Party	6 April 1926	12 September 2014	North Antrim	1970, 1974 I & II, 1979, 1983, 1987, 1992, 1997, 2001, 2005
Sir David Price	Conservative	20 November 1924	31 January 2014	Eastleigh	1955, 1959, 1964, 1966, 1970, 1974 I & II, 1979, 1983, 1987
Charles Simeons	Conservative	22 September 1921	3 August 2014	Luton	1970
Jeremy Thorpe	Liberal	29 April 1929	4 December 2014	North Devon	1959, 1964, 1966, 1970, 1974 I & II
Sir Colin Turner	Conservative	4 January 1922	21 March 2014	Woolwich West	1959
Hamish Watt	Scottish National Party	27 December 1925	12 April 2014	Banffshire	1974 I & II
Benjamin Whitaker	Labour	15 September 1934	8 June 2014	Hampstead	1966
John Wilkinson	Conservative	23 September 1940	1 March 2014	Bradford West Ruislip-Northwood	1970 1979, 1983, 1987, 1992, 1997, 2001
Alan Williams	Labour	14 October 1930	21 December 2014	Swansea West	1964, 1966, 1970, 1974 I & II, 1979, 1983, 1987, 1992, 1997, 2001, 2005

== 2015 ==
Individual	Party	Born	Died	Constituency(ies) represented	Election(s) won
Jack Aspinwall	Conservative (Note: Stood as a Liberal candidate in both the general elections in 1974.)	5 February 1933	19 May 2015	Kingswood Wansdyke	1979 1983, 1987, 1992
David Bellotti	Liberal Democrats	13 August 1943	10 June 2015	Eastbourne	1990 (by-election)
Leon Brittan, Baron Brittan of Spennithorne	Conservative	25 September 1939	21 January 2015	Cleveland and Whitby Richmond (Yorks)	1974 I & II, 1979 1983, 1987
Denis Coe	Labour	5 June 1929	3 March 2015	Middleton and Prestwich	1966
Sir Peter Fry	Conservative	26 May 1931	12 May 2015	Wellingborough	1969 (by-election), 1970, 1974 I & II, 1979, 1983, 1987, 1992
Sir Philip Goodhart	Conservative	3 November 1925	5 July 2015	Beckenham	1957 (by-election), 1959, 1964, 1966, 1970, 1974 I & II, 1979, 1983, 1987
Teresa Gorman	Conservative	30 September 1931	28 August 2015	Billericay	1987, 1992, 1997
Tommy Graham	Labour (Note: Later, independent)	5 December 1943	20 April 2015	Renfrew West and Inverclyde West Renfrewshire	1987, 1992 1997
Denis Healey, Baron Healey	Labour	30 August 1917	3 October 2015	Leeds South East Leeds East	1952 (by-election) 1955, 1959, 1964, 1966, 1970, 1974 I & II, 1979, 1983, 1987
Frank Hooley	Labour	30 November 1923	21 January 2015	Sheffield Heeley	1966, 1974 I & II, 1979
Geoffrey Howe, Baron Howe of Aberavon	Conservative	20 December 1926	9 October 2015	Bebington Reigate East Surrey	1964 1970 1974 I & II, 1979, 1983, 1987
Greville Janner, Baron Janner of Braunstone	Labour	11 July 1928	19 December 2015	Leicester North West Leicester West	1970 1974 I & II, 1979, 1983, 1987, 1992
Charles Kennedy	SDP then Liberal Democrats	25 November 1959	1 June 2015	Ross, Cromarty and Skye Ross, Skye and Inverness West Ross, Skye and Lochaber	1983, 1987, 1992 1997, 2001 2005, 2010
George Mackie, Baron Mackie of Benshie	Liberal	10 July 1919	17 February 2015	Caithness and Sutherland	1964
Roy Mason, Baron Mason of Barnsley	Labour	18 April 1924	19 April 2015	Barnsley Barnsley Central	1953 (by-election), 1955, 1959, 1964, 1966, 1970, 1974 I & II, 1979 1983
Michael Meacher (in office)	Labour	4 November 1939	21 October 2015	Oldham West Oldham West and Royton	1970, 1974 I & II, 1979, 1983, 1987, 1992 1997, 2001, 2005, 2010, 2015
Sir Hal Miller	Conservative	6 March 1929	21 March 2015	Bromsgrove and Redditch Bromsgrove	1974 I & II, 1979 1983, 1987
James Molyneaux, Baron Molyneaux of Killead	Ulster Unionist Party	27 August 1920	9 March 2015	South Antrim Lagan Valley	1970, 1974 I & II, 1979 1983, 1987, 1992
Sir Gerry Neale	Conservative	25 June 1941	28 October 2015	North Cornwall	1979, 1983, 1987
Sir John Osborn	Conservative	14 December 1922	2 December 2015	Sheffield Hallam	1959, 1964, 1966, 1970, 1974 I & II, 1979, 1983
Christopher Price	Labour	26 January 1932	21 February 2015	Birmingham Perry Barr Lewisham West	1966 1974 I & II, 1979
Paul Rose	Labour	26 December 1935	3 November 2015	Manchester Blackley	1964, 1966, 1970, 1974 I & II
Brian Sedgemore	Labour	17 March 1937	5 May 2015	Luton West Hackney South and Shoreditch	1974 I & II 1983, 1987, 1992, 1997, 2001
Sir Jim Spicer	Conservative	4 October 1925	21 March 2015	West Dorset	1974 I & II, 1979, 1983, 1987, 1992
Gerry Steinberg	Labour	20 April 1945	21 August 2015	City of Durham	1987, 1992, 1997, 2001
Bob Wareing	Labour	20 August 1930	1 May 2015	Liverpool West Derby	1983, 1987, 1992, 1997, 2001, 2005
Sir Jerry Wiggin	Conservative	24 February 1937	12 March 2015	Weston-super-Mare	1969 (by-election), 1970, 1974 I & II, 1979, 1983, 1987, 1992

== 2016 ==
Individual	Party	Born	Died	Constituency(ies) represented	Election(s) won
Robin Chichester-Clark	Ulster Unionist	10 January 1928	5 August 2016	Londonderry	1955, 1959, 1964, 1966, 1970
Jo Cox (in office)	Labour	22 June 1974	16 June 2016	Batley and Spen	2015
Sir Robert Durant	Conservative	9 January 1928	18 February 2016	Reading North Reading West	1974 I & II, 1979 1983, 1987, 1992
John Evans, Baron Evans of Parkside	Labour	19 October 1930	5 March 2016	Newton St Helens North	1974 I & II, 1979 1983, 1987, 1992
Mildred Gordon	Labour	24 August 1923	8 April 2016	Bow and Poplar	1987, 1992
Sir Anthony Grant	Conservative	29 May 1925	9 October 2016	Harrow Central Cambridgeshire South West	1964, 1966, 1970, 1974 I & II, 1979 1983, 1987, 1992
Harry Harpham (in office)	Labour	21 February 1954	4 February 2016	Sheffield Brightside and Hillsborough	2015
Patrick Jenkin, Baron Jenkin of Roding	Conservative	7 September 1926	20 December 2016	Wanstead and Woodford	1964, 1966, 1970, 1974 I & II, 1979, 1983
Arthur Latham	Labour	14 August 1930	3 December 2016	Paddington North Paddington	1969, 1970 1974 I & II
Eric Lubbock, 4th Baron Avebury	Liberal	29 September 1928	14 February 2016	Orpington	1962, 1964, 1966
Patrick Mayhew, Baron Mayhew of Twysden	Conservative	11 September 1929	25 June 2016	Tunbridge Wells	1974 I & II, 1979, 1983, 1987, 1992
William McKelvey	Labour	8 July 1934	18 October 2016	Kilmarnock Kilmarnock and Loudoun	1979 1983, 1987, 1992
Sir Albert McQuarrie	Conservative	1 January 1918	13 January 2016	East Aberdeenshire Banff and Buchan	1979 1983
Ronald King Murray, Lord Murray	Labour	15 June 1922	27 September 2016	Edinburgh Leith	1970, I & II, 1979
Eddie O'Hara	Labour	1 October 1937	28 May 2016	Knowsley South	1990 (by-election), 1992, 1997, 2001, 2005
Cecil Parkinson, Baron Parkinson	Conservative	1 September 1932	26 January 2016	Enfield West South Hertfordshire Hertsmere	1970 1974 I & II, 1979 1983, 1987
Jim Prior, Baron Prior	Conservative	11 October 1927	12 December 2016	Lowestoft Waveney	1959, 1964, 1966, 1970, 1974 I & II, 1979 1983
Ken Purchase	Labour	8 January 1939	28 August 2016	Wolverhampton North East	1992, 1997, 2001, 2005
David Rendel	Liberal Democrats	15 April 1949	16 May 2016	Newbury	1993 (by-election), 1997, 2001
John Roper, Baron Roper	Social Democratic Party (Labour from (1970–1981)	10 September 1935	29 January 2016	Farnworth	1970, 1974 I & II, 1979
Sir Dudley Smith	Conservative	14 November 1926	14 December 2016	Brentford and Chiswick Warwick and Leamington	1959, 1964 1968 (by-election), 1970, 1974 I & II, 1979, 1983, 1987, 1992
Allan Stewart	Conservative	1 June 1942	7 December 2016	East Renfrewshire Eastwood	1979 1983, 1987, 1992
George Thompson	Scottish National	11 September 1928	23 December 2016	Galloway	1974 II
John Watts	Conservative	18 April 1947	8 September 2016	Slough	1983, 1987, 1992
Brian White	Labour	5 May 1957	5 July 2016	North East Milton Keynes	1997, 2001

== 2017 ==
Individual	Party	Born	Died	Constituency(ies) represented	Election(s) won
Candy Atherton	Labour	21 September 1955	30 October 2017	Falmouth and Camborne	1997, 2001
Nigel Beard	Labour	10 October 1936	31 July 2017	Bexleyheath and Crayford	1997, 2001
Sir Clive Bossom	Conservative	4 February 1918	8 March 2017	Leominster	1959, 1964, 1966, 1970
Christine Butler	Labour	14 December 1943	19 September 2017	Castle Point	1997
Ronald Buxton	Conservative	20 August 1923	10 January 2017	Leyton	1965 (by-election)
Sir Edward du Cann	Conservative	28 May 1924	31 August 2017	Taunton	1956 (by-election), 1959, 1964, 1966, 1970, 1974 I & II, 1979, 1983
John Cummings	Labour	6 July 1943	4 January 2017	Easington	1987, 1992, 1997, 2001, 2005
Tam Dalyell	Labour	9 August 1932	26 January 2017	West Lothian Linlithgow	1962 (by-election), 1964, 1966, 1970, 1974 I & II, 1979 1983, 1987, 1992, 1997, 2001
James Davidson	Liberal	10 January 1927	29 June 2017	Aberdeenshire West	1966
Don Dixon, Baron Dixon	Labour	6 March 1929	19 February 2017	Jarrow	1979, 1983, 1987, 1992
Piers Dixon	Conservative	29 December 1928	24 March 2017	Truro	1970, 1974 I
Frank Doran	Labour	13 April 1949	30 October 2017	Aberdeen South Aberdeen Central Aberdeen North	1987 1997, 2001 2005, 2010
Nigel Forman	Conservative	9 August 1932	11 May 2017	Carshalton Carshalton and Wallington	1976 (by-election), 1979 1983, 1987, 1992
John Fraser	Labour	30 June 1934	6 April 2017	Norwood	1966, 1970, I & II, 1979, 1983, 1987, 1992
Jimmy Hood	Labour	16 May 1948	4 December 2017	Clydesdale Lanark and Hamilton East	1987, 1992, 1997, 2001 2005, 2010
Sir John Hunt	Conservative	27 October 1929	19 September 2017	Bromley Ravensbourne	1964, 1966, 1970 1974 I & II, 1979, 1983, 1987, 1992
Sir Gerald Kaufman (in office)	Labour	21 June 1930	26 February 2017	Manchester Ardwick Manchester Gorton	1970, 1974 I & II, 1979 1983, 1987, 1992, 1997, 2001, 2005, 2010, 2015
Paul Keetch	Liberal Democrats	21 May 1961	24 May 2017	Hereford	1997, 2001, 2005
Sir Michael Latham	Conservative	20 November 1942	2 November 2017	Melton Rutland and Melton	1974 I & II, 1979 1983, 1987
Martin McGuinness	Sinn Féin	23 May 1950	21 March 2017	Mid Ulster	1997, 2001, 2005, 2010
Kevin McNamara	Labour	5 September 1934	6 August 2017	Kingston upon Hull North Kingston upon Hull Central	1966, 1970, 1987, 1992, 1997, 2001 1974 I & II, 1979
Bill Michie	Labour	24 November 1935	22 September 2017	Sheffield Heeley	1983, 1987, 1992, 1997
Eric Moonman	Labour	29 April 1929	22 December 2017	Billericay Basildon	1966, 1970 1974 I & II
Rhodri Morgan	Labour	29 September 1939	17 May 2017	Cardiff West	1987, 1992, 1997
Roland Moyle	Labour	12 March 1928	14 July 2017	Lewisham North Lewisham East	1966, 1970 1974 I & II, 1979
Bill Pitt	Liberal	17 July 1937	17 November 2017	Croydon North West	1981 (by-election)
David Reed (Note: "REED, David", Who's Who)	Labour	24 April 1945	12 March 2017	Sedgefield	1970
Nigel Spearing	Labour	8 October 1930	8 January 2017	Acton Newham South	1970 1974 (by-election), 1974 II, 1979, 1983, 1987, 1992
John Taylor	Conservative	19 August 1941	30 May 2017	Solihull	1983, 1987, 1992, 1997, 2001
Sir Teddy Taylor	Conservative	18 April 1937	20 September 2017	Glasgow Cathcart Southend East Rochford and Southend East	1964, 1966, 1970, 1974 II & II 1980 (by-election), 1987, 1992 1997, 2001
Alan Thompson	Labour	16 September 1924	18 February 2017	Dunfermline Burghs	1959
David Waddington, Baron Waddington	Conservative	2 August 1929	23 February 2017	Nelson and Colne Clitheroe Ribble Valley	1968 (by-election), 1970, 1974 I 1979 1983, 1987
Bill Walker	Conservative	20 February 1929	6 June 2017	Perth & East Perthshire North Tayside	1979 1983, 1987, 1992
Gary Waller	Conservative	24 June 1945	21 July 2017	Brighouse and Spenborough Keighley	1979 1983, 1987, 1992
Sir John Wells	Conservative	30 March 1925	8 February 2017	Maidstone	1959, 1964, 1966, 1970, 1974 I & II, 1979, 1983
Gordon Wilson	Scottish National	16 April 1938	25 June 2017	Dundee East	1974 I & II, 1979, 1983

== 2018 ==
Individual	Party	Born	Died	Constituency(ies) represented	Election(s) won
Paddy Ashdown, Baron Ashdown of Norton-sub-Hamdon	Liberal Democrats (Liberal from 1983 to 1988)	27 February 1941	22 December 2018	Yeovil	1983, 1987, 1992, 1997
Michael Barnes	Labour	22 September 1932	22 March 2018	Brentford and Chiswick	1966, 1970
Sir Richard Body	Conservative	18 May 1927	26 February 2018	Billericay Holland with Boston Boston and Skegness	1955 1966, 1970, 1974 I & II, 1979, 1983, 1987, 1992 1997
Martin Brandon-Bravo	Conservative	25 March 1932	15 August 2018	Nottingham South	1983, 1987
Jim Callaghan	Labour	28 January 1927	29 March 2018	Middleton and Prestwich Heywood and Middleton	1974 I & 1974, 1979 1983, 1987, 1992
Tom Cox	Labour	24 January 1930	16 August 2018	Wandsworth Central Tooting	1970 1974 I & 1974, 1979, 1983, 1987, 1992, 1997, 2001
George Cunningham	Social Democratic (Labour from 1970 to 1981)	10 June 1931	27 July 2018	Islington South West Islington South and Finsbury	1970 1974 I & 1974, 1979
Arthur Davidson	Labour	7 November 1928	16 January 2018	Accrington	1966, 1970, 1974 I & II, 1979
Denzil Davies	Labour	9 October 1938	10 October 2018	Llanelli	1970, 1974 I & II, 1979, 1983, 1987, 1992, 1997, 2001
Ednyfed Hudson Davies	Labour	4 December 1929	11 January 2018	Conway Caerphilly	1966 1979
Geoffrey Dodsworth	Conservative	7 June 1928	29 March 2018	South West Hertfordshire	1974 I & 1974
Nicholas Edwards, Baron Crickhowell	Conservative	25 February 1934	17 March 2018	Pembrokeshire	1970, 1974 I & II, 1979
Norman Godman	Labour	19 April 1937	20 June 2018	Greenock and Port Glasgow Greenock and Invercylde	1983, 1987, 1992 1997
Warren Hawksley	Conservative	10 March 1943	9 March 2018	The Wrekin Halesowen and Stourbridge	1979, 1983 1992
John Hollingworth	Conservative	11 July 1930	4 March 2018	Birmingham All Saints	1959
William Howie, Baron Howie of Troon	Labour	2 March 1924	26 May 2018	Luton	1963 (by-election), 1964, 1966
Toby Jessel	Conservative	11 July 1934	3 December 2018	Twickenham	1970, 1974 I & II, 1979, 1983, 1987, 1992
Tessa Jowell, Baroness Jowell	Labour	17 September 1947	12 May 2018	Dulwich Dulwich and West Norwood	1992 1997, 2001, 2005, 2010
Michael Martin, Baron Martin of Springburn	Speaker (Labour from 1979 to 2000)	3 July 1945	29 April 2018	Glasgow Springburn Glasgow North East	1979, 1983, 1987, 1992, 1997, 2001 2005
Michael McGuire	Labour	3 May 1926	16 August 2018	Ince Makerfield	1964, 1966, 1970, 1974 I & II, 1979 1983
David Myles	Conservative	30 May 1925	15 December 2018	Banffshire	1979
John Ovenden	Labour	17 August 1942	17 July 2018	Gravesend	1974 I & II
Ivor Richard, Baron Richard	Labour	30 May 1932	18 March 2018	Barons Court	1964, 1966, 1970
Gwilym Roberts	Labour	7 August 1928	15 March 2018	South Bedfordshire Cannock	1966 1974 I & II, 1979
Sir Keith Speed	Conservative	11 March 1934	12 January 2018	Meriden Asford	1968 (by-election), 1970 1974 II, 1983, 1987, 1992
Ian Stewart, Baron Stewartby	Conservative	10 August 1935	3 March 2018	Hitchin North Hertfordshire	1974 I & II, 1979 1983, 1987
Thomas Stuttaford	Conservative	4 May 1931	8 June 2018	Norwich South	1970
Sir Peter Tapsell	Conservative	1 February 1930	18 August 2018	Nottingham West Horncastle East Lindsey Louth and Horncastle	1959 1966, 1970, 1974 I & II, 1979 1983, 1987, 1992 1997, 2001, 2005, 2010
Peter Temple-Morris, Baron Temple-Morris	Labour (Conservative from 1974 to 1998)	12 February 1938	1 May 2018	Leominster	1974 I & II, 1979, 1983, 1987, 1992, 1997
John Townend	Conservative	12 June 1934	18 August 2018	Bridlington East Yorkshire	1979, 1983, 1987, 1992 1997
Mark Wolfson	Conservative	7 April 1934	14 November 2018	Sevenoaks	1979, 1983, 1987, 1992

== 2019 ==
Individual	Party	Born	Died	Constituency(ies) represented	Election(s) won
John Carlisle	Conservative	28 August 1942	18 February 2019	Luton West Luton North	1979 1983, 1987, 1992
Frank Dobson	Labour	15 March 1940	11 November 2019	Holborn and St Pancras South Holborn and St Pancras	1979 1983, 1987, 1992, 1997, 2001, 2005, 2010
Jack Dunnett	Labour	24 June 1922	26 October 2019	Nottingham Central Nottingham East	1964, 1966 1974 I & II, 1979
John Ellis	Labour	22 October 1930	27 May 2019	Bristol North West Brigg and Scunthorpe	1966 1974 I & II
Michael English	Labour	24 December 1930	13 July 2019	Nottingham West	1964, 1966, 1970, 1974 I & II, 1979
Sir Reginald Eyre	Conservative	28 May 1924	27 January 2019	Birmingham Hall Green	1965 (by-election), 1966, 1970, 1974 I & II, 1979, 1983
Paul Flynn (in office)	Labour	9 February 1935	17 February 2019	Newport West	1987, 1992, 1997, 2001, 2005, 2010, 2015, 2017
Derek Foster, Baron Foster of Bishop Auckland	Labour	25 June 1937	5 January 2019	Bishop Auckland	1979, 1983, 1987, 1992, 1997, 2001
Sir Timothy Kitson	Conservative	28 January 1931	18 May 2019	Richmond (Yorks)	1959, 1964, 1966, 1970, 1974 I & II, 1979
David Lambie	Labour	13 July 1925	15 December 2019	Central Ayrshire Cunninghame South	1970, 1974 I & II, 1979 1983, 1987
Roderick MacFarquhar	Labour	2 December 1930	10 February 2019	Belper	1974 I & II
Bryan Magee	Social Democratic (Labour from 1974 to 1982)	12 April 1930	26 July 2019	Leyton	1974 I & II, 1979
Brian Mawhinney, Baron Mawhinney	Conservative	26 July 1940	9 November 2019	Peterborough North West Cambridgeshire	1979, 1983, 1987, 1992 1997, 2001
Andrew Miller	Labour	23 March 1949	24 December 2019	Ellesmere Port and Neston	1992, 1997, 2001, 2005, 2010
Sir Roger Moate	Conservative	12 May 1938	15 April 2019	Faversham	1970, 1974 I & II, 1979, 1983, 1987, 1992
John Moore, Baron Moore of Lower Marsh	Conservative	26 November 1937	20 May 2019	Croydon Central	1974 I & II, 1979, 1983, 1987
Rod Richards	Conservative	12 March 1947	14 July 2019	Clwyd North West	1992
Michael Spicer, Baron Spicer	Conservative	22 January 1943	29 May 2019	South Worcestershire West Worcestershire	1974 I & II, 1979, 1983, 1987, 1992 1997, 2001, 2005
Brian Walden	Labour	8 July 1932	9 May 2019	Birmingham All Saints Birmingham Ladywood	1964, 1966, 1970 1974 I & II
Sir Kenneth Warren	Conservative	15 August 1926	29 June 2019	Hastings Hastings and Rye	1970, 1974 I & II, 1979 1983, 1987

== See also ==
- List of United Kingdom MPs who died in the 1990s
- List of United Kingdom MPs who died in the 2000s
- List of United Kingdom MPs who died in the 2020s
