= Frank Judd, Baron Judd =

British Labour Party politician (1935–2021)

The Right Honourable The Lord Judd FRSA
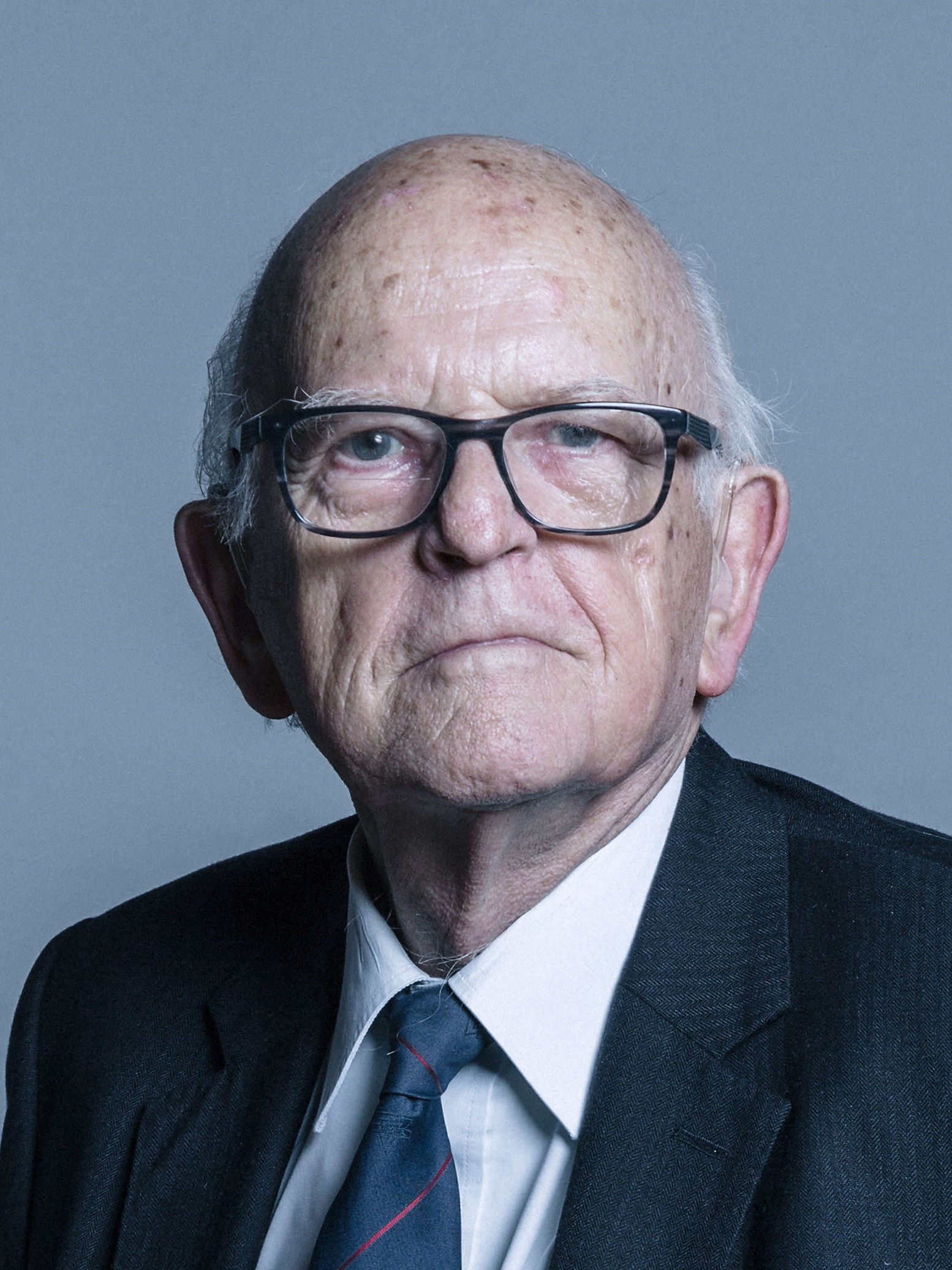
- Official portrait, 2018

Minister of State for Foreign and Commonwealth Affairs
- In office 21 February 1977 – 4 May 1979
- Prime Minister: James Callaghan
- Preceded by: David Owen
- Succeeded by: Peter Blaker

Minister for Overseas Development
- In office 21 December 1976 – 21 February 1977
- Prime Minister: James Callaghan
- Preceded by: Reg Prentice
- Succeeded by: Judith Hart

Parliamentary Secretary to the Ministry of Overseas Development
- In office 14 April 1976 – 21 December 1976
- Prime Minister: James Callaghan
- Preceded by: John Grant
- Succeeded by: John Tomlinson

Under-Secretary of State for the Navy
- In office 8 March 1974 – 14 April 1976
- Prime Minister: Harold Wilson
- Preceded by: Antony Buck
- Succeeded by: Patrick Duffy

Member of Parliament for Portsmouth North Portsmouth West (1966–1974)
- In office 31 March 1966 – 7 April 1979
- Preceded by: Terence Clarke
- Succeeded by: Peter Griffiths

Member of the House of Lords
- Lord Temporal
- Life peerage 10 June 1991 – 17 April 2021

Personal details
- Born: Frank Ashcroft Judd; 28 March 1935 Sutton, Surrey, England
- Died: 17 April 2021 (aged 86)
- Party: Labour
- Education: City of London School; London School of Economics

Frank Ashcroft Judd, Baron Judd, FRSA (28 March 1935 – 17 April 2021) was a British Labour politician. He was a Senior Fellow of Saferworld NGO from 1994 to 2002, and from 2002 to 2015, a trustee. In 2007, he became a member of the advisory board at the Centre for Human Rights, and from 2014 to 2015, a member of the Commission on Diplomacy, at the London School of Economics. He was a member of the Unite and GMB trade unions.

== Early life ==
Frank Ashcroft Judd was born in Sutton in March 1935, the son of the late Charles Judd, CBE and Helen Osborn Judd (née Ashcroft), a JP.

He was educated at the City of London School and the London School of Economics. At the age of 15, he joined the Labour Party, influenced by his mother's activism in the party and his father's internationalism.

From 1957 to 1959, Judd was on a Short Service Commission in the Royal Air Force's Education Branch. He became Secretary-General of the International Voluntary Service in 1960, and is credited with overseeing a significant period of expansion for the organisation. In 1966, Judd left his position at IVS to begin a career in politics.

== Political career ==
Judd contested the safe Conservative seat of Sutton and Cheam in 1959 (where his mother Helen had been the Labour candidate in 1945) and the marginal Portsmouth West in 1964, losing to the Conservative incumbent by just 497 votes. He became a Member of Parliament in 1966, after gaining Portsmouth West for Labour, in a general election which saw his party win a large majority in the House of Commons.

The following year, he was made Parliamentary Private Secretary (PPS) to the Minister of Housing and Local Government, a role he held until 1970. He narrowly held his seat at that year's general election, by just 955 votes, although Labour lost power to the Conservatives nationally. Judd became PPS to the Leader of the Opposition, former prime minister Harold Wilson, holding this role from 1970 to 1972. He was a member of the British Parliamentary Delegation to the Council of Europe and the Western European Union from 1970 to 1973. In 1972, he joined Labour's Front Bench Defence Team, remaining there until 1974.

At the February 1974 general election, Judd stood for the new seat of Portsmouth North, created from parts of his old seat, winning it with a majority of only 320 votes. The election saw Labour return to government, and Judd became Parliamentary Under-Secretary of State for Defence (Navy) at the Ministry of Defence, remaining in the post until 1976. That year, he was made Parliamentary Under-Secretary of State for the Ministry of Overseas Development and became the Minister of State for that department, serving until the following year. From 1977 to 1979, he was the Minister of State for Foreign and Commonwealth Affairs.

When the government lost a vote of no confidence, a new general election was called in 1979, in which Labour were defeated by the Conservatives. In line with this national swing, Judd lost his seat to the Conservative Peter Griffiths.

Judd was made a life peer on 10 June 1991 with the title Baron Judd, of Portsea in the County of Hampshire. In the Lords, he was opposition front bench spokesperson on foreign affairs (1991 to 1992), and on defence (1995 to 1997). He was also principal spokesperson on education (1992 to 1994) and overseas development co-operation (1994 to 1997). Judd was a member of several committees in Parliament, including the Joint Committee on Human Rights from 2003 to 2007. He was again a member of the Council of Europe Parliamentary Assembly from 1997 to 2005, where he became rapporteur on Chechnya (from 1999 to 2004) and visited Grozny several times, for which he was posthumously rewarded with the Order of Friendship by the Chechen government in exile.

Judd was interviewed in 2012 as part of The History of Parliament's oral history project. From 2015 to 2019, he was a member of the EU Justice Sub Committee.

== Outside Parliament ==
Judd was Director of Voluntary Service Overseas from 1980 to 1985, and Oxfam from 1985 to 1991. In 1990 and 1991, he was chairman of the World Economic Forum Conference in Geneva on the future of South Africa.

In 1996, he became National President of YMCA England, a role he held until 2005. From 2002 to 2012, he was President of the Friends of the Royal Navy Museum in Portsmouth, and was latterly its Honorary Life Vice-president. He was also active in the Friends of the Lake District as its President (2005–12), becoming a Patron in 2012, and in the governance of a number of universities. In 2013, he became a Life Member of the Court of Newcastle University. Judd was a governor at LSE from 1982 to 2012, later being made Governor Emeritus.

== Honours ==
In 1995, Judd became a Freeman of the City of Portsmouth. He was made an Honorary Fellow of the University of Portsmouth (formerly Portsmouth Polytechnic) in 1978, and the University of Lancaster in 2015. He received honorary doctorates from a number of universities: Bradford University in 1987, Portsmouth in 1997, De Montfort in 2006 (DLitt) and Greenwich in1999 (LLD). In 1988, he was made a Fellow of the Royal Society of Arts.

== Personal life and death ==
In 1961, Judd married Christine Elizabeth Willington; they had two daughters. His recreations were listed in Who's Who as "relaxing in the countryside, family holidays, enjoying music, opera, theatre and film". He was a member of the Royal Over-Seas League club.

He died in April 2021 at the age of 86.

== Publications ==
- Radical Future, 1967 (co-author)
- Fabian International Essays, 1970
- Purpose in Socialism, 1973
- Our Global Neighbourhood, 1995 (co-author)
- Imagining Tomorrow: rethinking the global challenge, 2000 (co-author)

Judd also wrote articles and papers about current affairs.

Parliament of the United Kingdom
Preceded by Terence Clarke	Member of Parliament for Portsmouth West; 1966 – February 1974	Constituency abolished
New constituency	Member of Parliament for Portsmouth North; February 1974 – 1979	Succeeded by Peter Griffiths
Party political offices
Preceded by Anthony Lester	Chairman of the Fabian Society; 1973–1974	Succeeded by Nicholas Bosanquet
Political offices
Preceded by Reg Prentice	Minister for Overseas Development; 1976–1977	Succeeded by Judith Hart
