= David Lane (British politician) =

British politician (1922–1998)

Sir David William Stennis Stuart Lane (24 September 1922 – 16 November 1998) was a British Conservative politician.

Lane was educated at Eton College, Trinity College, Cambridge and Yale University. He became a barrister, called to the bar by Middle Temple in 1955. From 1956 to 1959, he was secretary of the British Iron and Steel Federation. From 1959 to 1967, he worked for Shell International Petroleum in their trade relations department.

Lane contested Vauxhall in 1964 and Cambridge in 1966. He was Member of Parliament for Cambridge from a 1967 by-election until he resigned in 1976. He was Under-Secretary of State for the Home Department from 1972 to 1974. He was the first director of the Commission for Racial Equality (1977–82).

He was knighted in 1983 and became Chairman of the National Association of Youth Clubs after he left Parliament.

Parliament of the United Kingdom
Preceded by Robert Davies	Member of Parliament for Cambridge; 1967 – 1976	Succeeded by Robert Rhodes James
