= Terence Clarke (politician) =

British Army officer and politician (1904–1992)

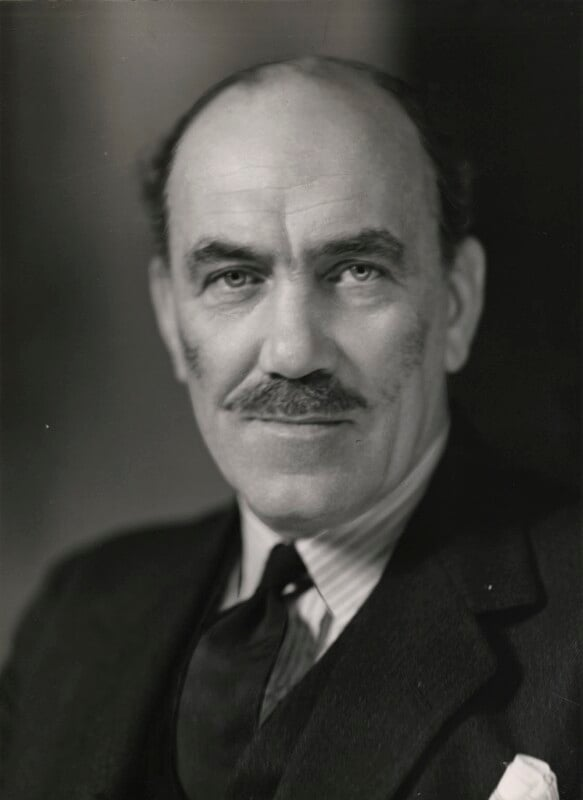
Clarke in 1952

Brigadier Terence Hugh Clarke, CBE (17 February 1904 – 26 May 1992) was a British army officer and politician.

== Army career ==
Clarke was from an army family and was born in Ascot. He went to Temple Grove School and Haileybury, followed by the Royal Military College, Sandhurst. At the age of twenty he was commissioned into the Gloucestershire Regiment as a second lieutenant. He served in India and China for seven years in the Indian Army Ordnance Corps before returning to Britain. He was a member of the Army's rugby team and also boxed as a heavyweight for the Army. He transferred into the Royal Army Ordnance Corps in 1933.

== Wartime service ==
During the Second World War Clarke served in Norway in 1940 where he was mentioned in dispatches. Later he had a key role in planning the logistical support for the Allied campaign in North Africa (he won the CBE in 1943), and then the invasion in Normandy. Clarke landed in Normandy and followed the campaign up to Lüneberg Heath (Lündeberge Heide) where he made arrangements to accept the surrender of more than a million Germany soldiers to Montgomery on 4 May 1945.

== Post-war activities ==
After the war, Clarke was a Liberal Party candidate in Pudsey and Otley at the 1945 general election. He then returned to the Army; Clarke commanded the RAOC Training Centre and then became deputy director of ordnance services for the Southern Command. In 1950 Clarke left the Army to go into industry as a director of public and private companies; he was almost immediately elected as Conservative Party Member of Parliament for Portsmouth West by the slim majority of 945 votes.

== Parliamentary career ==
In Parliament Clarke was an advocate of strong defence, and joined the "Suez group" of Conservative MPs who wanted strong confrontation of the Egyptian government over the Suez Canal, and after the ceasefire in the Suez crisis of 1956 he abstained on a vote approving government policy. He called for prosecution of several British Communists for treason when the Ministry of Defence revealed that they had visited British prisoners of war in Korea to try to persuade them to defect.

Clarke was a strong opponent of Archbishop Makarios of Cyprus, and in 1960 protested that Dr Hastings Banda, the British-educated dictator of Malawi, had "shouted at me and behaved in a way I have seen no English or African politician behave before" (Clarke wanted the Federation of Rhodesia and Nyasaland to continue).

== Attitude to left-wing politics ==
As a right-winger, Clarke became increasingly vocal in attacking the Labour Party, and especially its left wing. When a left-wing rebellion against the defence estimates in 1961 turned out to be less than expected, he shouted "What a poor rebellion!" He was astonished that Harold Wilson had appointed a Minister for Disarmament in the Foreign Office in 1964, and was so strong an opponent of Sydney Silverman's Bill to abolish capital punishment that he said that Silverman and the three most recent Home Secretaries should themselves be hanged.

== Loss of seat ==
Having had his majority reduced to 497 votes in 1964, Clarke lost his seat in the 1966 general election. When the result was announced (televised live on ITN's election programme), Clarke shouted back at the assembled crowd "You're all bloody fools!" He attempted to regain his seat at the 1970 general election but despite the national swing to the Conservatives, he made only a tiny reduction in the Labour majority.

Parliament of the United Kingdom
New constituency	Member of Parliament for Portsmouth West; 1950–1966	Succeeded by Frank Judd
