= 1967 Cambridge by-election =

UK parliamentary by-election

The 1967 Cambridge by-election of 21 September 1967 was held after the premature death of Cambridge's Labour MP Robert Davies in June 1967.

The seat was highly marginal, having only been won by Labour during the previous year's Labour landslide by 439 votes, and it had only been the second time Labour had ever taken the constituency. In the ensuing by-election, a swing of more than eight percent to the Conservatives saw their candidate David Lane win by 5,978 votes.

== Candidates ==
- David Lane was an Eton, Cambridge and Yale-educated former barrister who had been working for Shell Oil since 1959. He was the only candidate to have previously contested the seat, having done so in 1966.
- George Bazeley Scurfield (1920-1991) was educated at St. John's College, Cambridge, and was a writer and second-hand bookseller. He had been a member of Cambridge City Council representing Petersfield ward from 1963 to 1966, and he would go on to contest the seat again in 1970.
- David Spreckley (1915-13), a caravan builder, was a former Labour member of Huntingdonshire County Council. He had been the Liberal candidate for Great Yarmouth in the 1964 general election and Huntingdon in 1966. He would go on to contest the 1969 Newcastle-under-Lyme by-election for the Liberals.

== Result of the previous general election ==
General election 1966: Cambridge
Party	Candidate	Votes	%	±%
Labour	Robert Davies	21,963	45.47	+5.01
Conservative	David Lane	20,972	43.42	+0.05
Liberal	Michael O'Loughlin	4,928	10.20	−5.97
Independent	P. King	439	0.91	N/A
Majority		991	2.05	N/A
Turnout		48,302	80.00	+0.86
Labour gain from Conservative		Swing	+2.48	

== Result of the by-election on 21 September 1967 ==
Cambridge by-election, 21 September 1967
Party	Candidate	Votes	%	±%
Conservative	David Lane	20,488	51.61	+8.19
Labour	George Bazeley Scurfield	14,510	36.55	−8.92
Liberal	David Spreckley	4,701	11.84	+1.64
Majority		5,978	15.06	N/A
Turnout		39,699	65.70	−14.30
Conservative gain from Labour		Swing		

The Conservative victory was described as "always expected" in an editorial in the next day's The Glasgow Herald. The result was overshadowed by the shock outcome of the same day's Walthamstow West by-election, where an 18.4% Labour to Conservative swing saw the Conservatives narrowly gain a seat Labour had held since 1929.
