= Portsmouth West =

Former parliamentary constituency in the United Kingdom

- Former borough constituency for the House of Commons
- Boundary of Portsmouth West in Hampshire for the 1955 general election
- County: Hampshire

1950–1974
- Seats: One
- Created from: Portsmouth North (Bulk); Portsmouth Central (Part)
- Replaced by: Portsmouth North (Bulk); Portsmouth South (Part)

Portsmouth West was a borough constituency in the city of Portsmouth in Hampshire, England. It returned one Member of Parliament (MP) to the House of Commons of the Parliament of the United Kingdom, elected by the first-past-the-post voting system.

== History ==
The constituency was created for the 1950 general election, and abolished for the February 1974 general election.

== Boundaries and boundary changes ==
Dates	Local authority	Maps	Wards
1950–1955	County Borough of Portsmouth		Buckland, Charles Dickens, Fratton, Guildhall, Nelson, North End, Portsea, and St Mary.
1955–1974	County Borough of Portsmouth		Buckland, Fratton, Nelson, North End, Portsea, and St Mary and Guildhall.

=== 1950–1955 ===
The constituency was formed from the abolished constituencies of Portsmouth North and Portsmouth Central

=== 1955–1974 ===
Wards renamed

=== Abolition ===
After the Second periodic review of Westminster constituencies, Buckland and Fratton wards were transferred to Portsmouth South, while the bulk of the seat was combined with parts of Portsmouth Langstone to form the re-established constituency of Portsmouth North.

== Members of Parliament ==
Election	Member	Party	Notes
1950	Terence Clarke	Conservative	
1966	Frank Judd	Labour	Contested Portsmouth North following redistribution
Feb 1974	constituency abolished: see Portsmouth North and Portsmouth South		

== Election results ==
General election 1970: Portsmouth West
Party	Candidate	Votes	%	±%
Labour	Frank Judd	17,169	50.6	–1.1
Conservative	Terence Clarke	16,214	47.7	–0.6
Independent	LB Gauntlett	579	1.7	New
Majority		955	2.8	–0.6
Turnout		33,962	72.3	–4.2
Registered electors		46,972		
Labour hold		Swing	–0.3	

General election 1966: Portsmouth West
Party	Candidate	Votes	%	±%
Labour	Frank Judd	18,685	51.7	+2.4
Conservative	Terence Clarke	17,458	48.3	–2.4
Majority		1,227	3.4	N/A
Turnout		36,143	76.5	+1.7
Registered electors		47,247		
Labour gain from Conservative		Swing	+2.4	

General election 1964: Portsmouth West
Party	Candidate	Votes	%	±%
Conservative	Terence Clarke	18,762	50.7	–7.0
Labour	Frank Judd	18,265	49.3	+7.0
Majority		497	1.3	–14.0
Turnout		37,027	74.8	–2.2
Registered electors		49,517		
Conservative hold		Swing	–7.0	

General election 1959: Portsmouth West
Party	Candidate	Votes	%	±%
Conservative	Terence Clarke	23,600	57.7	+3.5
Labour	Maxwell Bresler	17,334	42.3	–3.5
Majority		6,266	15.3	+6.9
Turnout		40,934	76.9	+3.5
Registered electors		53,206		
Conservative hold		Swing	+3.5	

General election 1955: Portsmouth West
Party	Candidate	Votes	%	±%
Conservative	Terence Clarke	23,729	54.2	+2.9
Labour	Alma Birk	20,060	45.8	–2.9
Majority		3,669	8.4	+5.9
Turnout		43,789	77.4	–6.1
Registered electors		56,597		
Conservative hold		Swing	+2.9	

General election 1951: Portsmouth West
Party	Candidate	Votes	%	±%
Conservative	Terence Clarke	25,363	51.3	+0.6
Labour	Alma Birk	24,115	48.7	–0.0
Majority		1,248	2.5	+0.6
Turnout		49,478	83.5	+0.0
Registered electors		59,262		
Conservative hold		Swing	+0.3	

General election 1950: Portsmouth West
Party	Candidate	Votes	%
Conservative	Terence Clarke	24,924	50.7
Labour	Donald Bruce	23,979	48.8
Communist	G Swanton	251	0.5
Majority		945	1.9
Turnout		49,154	83.5
Registered electors		58,892	
Conservative win (new seat)			
