= Electoral history of Andy Burnham =

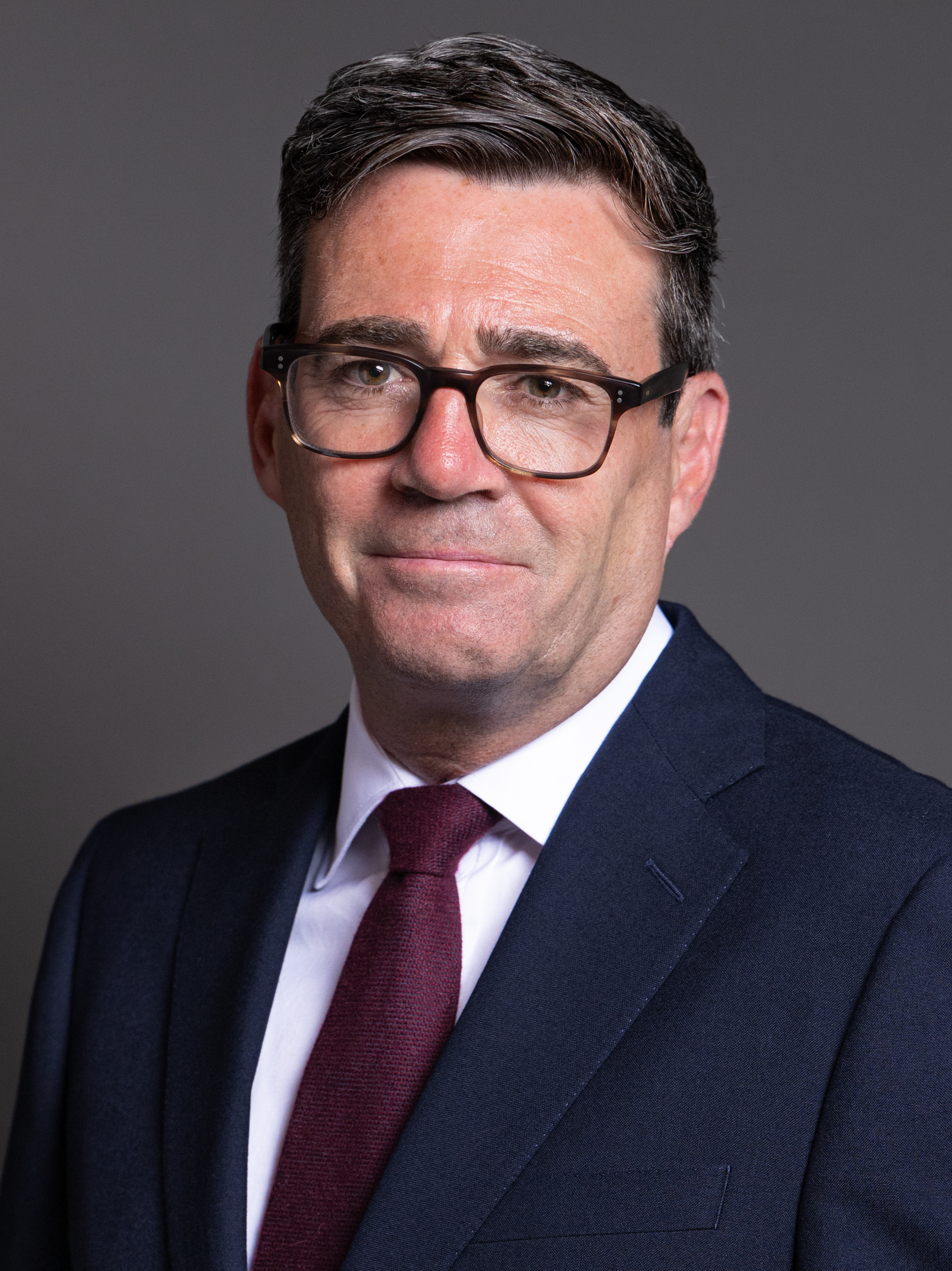
Official parliamentary portrait, 2026

Andy Burnham is a British politician who has served as Prime Minister of the United Kingdom and Leader of the Labour Party since July 2026. He has been Member of Parliament (MP) for Makerfield since June 2026, and was Mayor of Greater Manchester from 2017 to 2026. Burnham previously served as the MP for Leigh from 2001 to 2017.

== Parliamentary elections ==
=== 2001 general election, Leigh ===
General election 2001: Leigh
Party	Candidate	Votes	%	±%
Labour	Andy Burnham	22,783	64.5	−4.4
Conservative	Andrew Oxley	6,421	18.2	+2.6
Liberal Democrats	Ray Atkins	4,524	12.8	+1.6
Socialist Labour	William Kelly	820	2.3	New
UKIP	Chris Best	750	2.1	New
Majority		16,362	46.3	−7.0
Turnout		35,298	49.7	−16.0
Labour hold		Swing	−3.5	

=== 2005 general election, Leigh ===
General election 2005: Leigh
Party	Candidate	Votes	%	±%
Labour	Andy Burnham	23,097	63.3	−1.2
Conservative	Laurance Wedderburn	5,825	16.0	−2.2
Liberal Democrats	Dave Crowther	4,962	13.6	+0.8
Community Action	Ian Franzen	2,185	6.0	New
Legalise Cannabis	Thomas Hampson	415	1.1	New
Majority		17,272	47.3	+1.0
Turnout		36,484	50.3	+0.6
Labour hold		Swing	+0.5	

=== 2010 general election, Leigh ===
General election 2010: Leigh
Party	Candidate	Votes	%	±%
Labour	Andy Burnham	21,295	48.0	−15.3
Conservative	Shazia Awan	9,284	20.9	+3.2
Liberal Democrats	Chris Blackburn	8,049	18.2	−2.1
BNP	Gary Chadwick	2,724	6.1	New
UKIP	Mary Lavelle	1,535	3.5	New
Independent	Norman Bradbury	988	2.2	New
Independent	Terry Dainty	320	0.7	New
Christian	Ryan Hessell	137	0.3	New
Majority		12,011	27.1	−20.2
Turnout		44,332	62.0	+10.7
Labour hold		Swing	−4.9	

=== 2015 general election, Leigh ===
General election 2015: Leigh
Party	Candidate	Votes	%	±%
Labour	Andy Burnham	24,312	53.9	+5.9
Conservative	Louisa Townson	10,216	22.6	+1.7
UKIP	Les Leggett	8,903	19.7	+16.2
Liberal Democrats	Bill Winlow	1,150	2.5	−15.7
TUSC	Stephen Hall	542	1.2	New
Majority		14,096	31.3	+4.2
Turnout		45,123	59.4	−2.6
Labour hold		Swing	+2.0	

=== 2026 by-election, Makerfield ===
2026 Makerfield by-election
Party	Candidate	Votes	%	±%
Labour Co-op	Andy Burnham	24,927	54.8	+9.6
Reform	Robert Kenyon	15,696	34.5	+2.7
Restore	Rebecca Shepherd	3,111	6.8	New
Conservative	Michael Winstanley	997	2.2	−8.7
Green	Sarah Wakefield	308	0.7	−3.7
Liberal Democrats	Jake Austin	163	0.4	−6.4
Binface	Count Binface	95	0.2	New
Monster Raving Loony	Howling Laud Hope	45	0.1	New
Independent	John Dyer	37	0.1	New
Rejoin EU (Note: Using the description Rejoin EU Bring In PR)	Peter Ward	35	0.1	New
Libertarian	Dan Clarke	18	0.04	New
Climate	Ed Gemmell	18	0.04	New
Independent	Robert Pownall	18	0.04	New
Independent	Paul Gould	8	0.02	New
Majority		9,231	20.3	+6.9
Turnout		45,476	58.7	+6.3
Registered electors		77,462		
Labour Co-op hold		Swing	3.5	

== Mayoral elections ==
=== 2017 mayoral election, Greater Manchester ===
Results of the election by wards

Greater Manchester Mayoral Election 2017
Party	Candidate	1st round		2nd round			1st round votesTransfer votes, 2nd round
Party	Candidate	Total	Of round	Transfers	Total	Of round	1st round votesTransfer votes, 2nd round
Labour Co-op	Andy Burnham	359,352	63.4%				
Conservative	Sean Anstee	128,752	22.7%				
Liberal Democrats	Jane Brophy	34,334	6.1%				
Green	Will Patterson	13,424	2.4%				
English Democrat	Stephen Morris	11,115	2.0%				
UKIP	Shneur Odze	10,583	1.9%				
Independent	Mohammad Aslam	5,815	1.0%				
Independent	Marcus Farmer	3,360	0.6%				
Majority					230,600	40.2%	
Turnout		573,543	28.9%				
Labour win							

=== 2021 mayoral election, Greater Manchester ===
The incumbent mayor Andy Burnham retained his position within the first round, increasing his majority from the 2017 election by 10.2 percentage points with a swing from the Conservatives to Labour of 3.5 percentage points.

Greater Manchester Mayoral Election 2021
Party	Candidate	1st round		2nd round			1st round votesTransfer votes, 2nd round
Party	Candidate	Total	Of round	Transfers	Total	Of round	1st round votesTransfer votes, 2nd round
Labour Co-op	Andy Burnham	473,024	67.31%				
Conservative	Laura Evans	137,753	19.60%				
Green	Melanie Horrocks	30,699	4.37%				
Liberal Democrats	Simon Lepori	22,373	3.18%				
Reform	Nick Buckley	18,910	2.69%				
English Democrat	Stephen Morris	9,488	1.35%				
Independent	Marcus Farmer	6,448	0.92%				
Independent	David Sutcliffe	2,182	0.31%				
Independent	Alec Marvel	1,907	0.27%				
Majority					335,271	50.4%	
Turnout		714,745	34.74%	Rejected ballots: 11,743			
Registered electors		2,057,643					

=== 2024 mayoral election, Greater Manchester ===
2024 Greater Manchester mayoral election
Party	Candidate	Votes	%	±%
Labour Co-op	Andy Burnham	420,749	63.4	▼3.9
Conservative	Laura Evans	68,946	10.4	▼9.2
Independent	Nick Buckley	50,304	7.6	New
Reform	Dan Barker	49,532	7.5	▲4.8
Green	Hannah Spencer	45,905	6.9	▲2.5
Liberal Democrats	Jake Austin	28,195	4.2	▲1.0
Majority		351,803	53.0	
Rejected ballots		5,863	0.9	
Turnout		669,494	32.1	▼2.7
Registered electors		2,088,644		
Labour Co-op hold		Swing	▲2.7	

== Leadership elections ==
=== 2010 Labour Party leadership election ===
Each of the three electorates or sections contributed one third (33.33 per cent) of the total votes and were counted using the Alternative Vote system.

=== Overall result ===
First round
Candidate	MPs/MEPs (33.3%)		Labour Party members (33.3%)		Affiliated members (33.3%)		Overall result
Candidate	Votes	%	Votes	%	Votes	%	%
David Miliband	111	41.7	55,905	44.1	58,189	27.5	37.8
Ed Miliband	84	31.6	37,980	29.9	87,585	41.5	34.3
Ed Balls	40	15.0	12,831	10.1	21,618	10.2	11.8
Andy Burnham	24	9.0	10,844	8.5	17,904	8.5	8.7
Diane Abbott ✗	7	2.6	9,314	7.3	25,938	12.3	7.4

The combined total of first-round votes for Balls, Burnham, and Abbott (27.89%) was less than Ed Miliband's vote (34.33%). Thus, it was certain after the first round that Balls, Burnham, and Abbott would all be eliminated.

Second round
Candidate	MPs/MEPs (33.3%)		Labour Party members (33.3%)		Affiliated members (33.3%)		Overall result
Candidate	Votes	%	Votes	%	Votes	%	%
David Miliband	111	42.0	57,128	45.2	61,336	29.4	38.9
Ed Miliband	88	33.3	42,176	33.4	95,335	45.7	37.5
Ed Balls	41	15.5	14,510	11.5	26,441	12.7	13.2
Andy Burnham ✗	24	9.1	12,498	9.9	25,528	12.2	10.4

Third round
Candidate	MPs/MEPs (33.3%)		Labour Party members (33.3%)		Affiliated members (33.3%)		Overall result
Candidate	Votes	%	Votes	%	Votes	%	%
David Miliband	125	47.3	60,375	48.2	66,889	32.6	42.7
Ed Miliband	96	36.4	46,697	37.3	102,882	50.1	41.3
Ed Balls ✗	43	16.3	18,114	14.5	35,512	17.3	16.0

Fourth round
Candidate	MPs/MEPs (33.3%)		Labour Party members (33.3%)		Affiliated members (33.3%)		Overall result
Candidate	Votes	%	Votes	%	Votes	%	%
Ed Miliband ✓	122	46.6	55,992	45.6	119,405	59.8	50.7
David Miliband	140	53.4	66,814	54.4	80,266	40.2	49.3

Turnout in the members section was 71.7%, with 127,330 votes cast of the 177,558 ballots distributed. Amongst affiliated members, turnout was 9.0%, whilst amongst MPs/MEPs turnout was 98.5%.

=== Labour MPs and MEPs ===
MP	First Choice	Second Choice	Third Choice	Fourth Choice	Fifth Choice
Diane Abbott	Diane Abbott	None	None	None	None
Bob Ainsworth	David Miliband	Ed Miliband	Andy Burnham	Ed Balls	Diane Abbott
Douglas Alexander	David Miliband	Ed Miliband	Ed Balls	Andy Burnham	Diane Abbott
Heidi Alexander	Andy Burnham	David Miliband	Ed Miliband	None	None
Rushanara Ali	David Miliband	Ed Miliband	Ed Balls	Andy Burnham	Diane Abbott
Graham Allen	David Miliband	Ed Miliband	None	None	None
Dave Anderson	Ed Balls	Ed Miliband	David Miliband	Andy Burnham	Diane Abbott
Ian Austin	Ed Balls	David Miliband	Andy Burnham	Ed Miliband	Diane Abbott
Adrian Bailey	Ed Miliband	David Miliband	Ed Balls	Andy Burnham	None
Willie Bain	David Miliband	Ed Miliband	Ed Balls	Andy Burnham	Diane Abbott
Ed Balls	Ed Balls	None	None	None	None
Gordon Banks	David Miliband	Ed Miliband	Ed Balls	Andy Burnham	None
Kevin Barron	Andy Burnham	Ed Miliband	David Miliband	Ed Balls	Diane Abbott
Hugh Bayley	David Miliband	Ed Miliband	Ed Balls	Andy Burnham	Diane Abbott
Margaret Beckett	Ed Miliband	None	None	None	None
Anne Begg	Ed Miliband	David Miliband	Ed Balls	Andy Burnham	Diane Abbott
Stuart Bell	David Miliband	Ed Balls	None	None	None
Hilary Benn	Ed Miliband	David Miliband	None	None	None
Joe Benton	Andy Burnham	David Miliband	Ed Miliband	Ed Balls	None
Luciana Berger	Ed Miliband	David Miliband	Ed Balls	Andy Burnham	Diane Abbott
Clive Betts	Andy Burnham	Ed Miliband	None	None	None
Roberta Blackman-Woods	Ed Miliband	Andy Burnham	None	None	None
Hazel Blears	Andy Burnham	David Miliband	Ed Balls	Ed Miliband	None
Tom Blenkinsop	Ed Balls	David Miliband	None	None	None
Paul Blomfield	Ed Miliband	None	None	None	None
David Blunkett	Andy Burnham	David Miliband	None	None	None
Ben Bradshaw	David Miliband	None	None	None	None
Kevin Brennan	Ed Balls	David Miliband	Ed Miliband	Andy Burnham	Diane Abbott
Gordon Brown	None	None	None	None	None
Lyn Brown	Ed Balls	David Miliband	Ed Miliband	None	None
Russell Brown	David Miliband	Ed Miliband	Ed Balls	Andy Burnham	None
Chris Bryant	David Miliband	Ed Balls	Andy Burnham	Ed Miliband	Diane Abbott
Karen Buck	Ed Miliband	None	None	None	None
Richard Burden	David Miliband	Ed Miliband	Ed Balls	None	None
Andy Burnham	Andy Burnham	David Miliband	Ed Miliband	Ed Balls	Diane Abbott
Liam Byrne	David Miliband	Ed Balls	None	None	None
David Cairns	David Miliband	None	None	None	None
Alan Campbell	David Miliband	Andy Burnham	None	None	None
Ronnie Campbell	Andy Burnham	Ed Miliband	None	None	None
Michael Cashman MEP	David Miliband	Ed Miliband	None	None	None
Martin Caton	Ed Miliband	Diane Abbott	Ed Balls	None	None
Jenny Chapman	David Miliband	None	None	None	None
Katy Clark	Diane Abbott	Ed Balls	Ed Miliband	Andy Burnham	David Miliband
Tom Clarke	David Miliband	Andy Burnham	Diane Abbott	Ed Miliband	Ed Balls
Ann Clwyd	David Miliband	None	None	None	None
Vernon Coaker	Ed Balls	David Miliband	Ed Miliband	Andy Burnham	None
Ann Coffey	David Miliband	Ed Miliband	Andy Burnham	Ed Balls	Diane Abbott
Michael Connarty	Andy Burnham	Ed Balls	Ed Miliband	David Miliband	Diane Abbott
Rosie Cooper	David Miliband	Ed Balls	None	None	None
Yvette Cooper	Ed Balls	None	None	None	None
Jeremy Corbyn	Diane Abbott	Ed Miliband	None	None	None
David Crausby	Ed Balls	David Miliband	Ed Miliband	Andy Burnham	Diane Abbott
Mary Creagh	David Miliband	Ed Balls	Ed Miliband	Andy Burnham	Diane Abbott
Stella Creasy	David Miliband	Ed Miliband	None	None	None
Jon Cruddas	David Miliband	Ed Balls	Ed Miliband	Diane Abbott	Andy Burnham
John Cryer	Ed Miliband	Ed Balls	David Miliband	Andy Burnham	Diane Abbott
Alex Cunningham	David Miliband	Ed Miliband	Ed Balls	Andy Burnham	Diane Abbott
Jim Cunningham	Ed Balls	David Miliband	Ed Miliband	Andy Burnham	Diane Abbott
Tony Cunningham	Ed Balls	Ed Miliband	David Miliband	Andy Burnham	None
Margaret Curran	Ed Miliband	David Miliband	Andy Burnham	Ed Balls	Diane Abbott
Nic Dakin	David Miliband	Ed Miliband	Ed Balls	Andy Burnham	Diane Abbott
Simon Danczuk	David Miliband	None	None	None	None
Alistair Darling	David Miliband	None	None	None	None
Wayne David	Ed Miliband	David Miliband	Ed Balls	Andy Burnham	Diane Abbott
Ian Davidson	Ed Balls	Ed Miliband	David Miliband	Andy Burnham	Diane Abbott
Geraint Davies	Ed Miliband	David Miliband	Ed Balls	None	None
Gloria De Piero	David Miliband	Ed Miliband	None	None	None
John Denham	Ed Miliband	None	None	None	None
Jim Dobbin	Ed Balls	Ed Miliband	None	None	None
Frank Dobson	Ed Miliband	Ed Balls	None	None	None
Thomas Docherty	Andy Burnham	David Miliband	Ed Miliband	Ed Balls	Diane Abbott
Brian Donohoe	David Miliband	Ed Miliband	Ed Balls	Andy Burnham	Diane Abbott
Frank Doran	Ed Miliband	David Miliband	Ed Balls	Andy Burnham	None
Jim Dowd	David Miliband	None	None	None	None
Gemma Doyle	David Miliband	Ed Miliband	Ed Balls	Diane Abbott	Andy Burnham
Jack Dromey	Ed Miliband	None	None	None	None
Michael Dugher	Ed Balls	Ed Miliband	None	None	None
Angela Eagle	David Miliband	Ed Balls	Ed Miliband	Andy Burnham	Diane Abbott
Maria Eagle	Ed Miliband	None	None	None	None
Clive Efford	Ed Miliband	David Miliband	Ed Balls	Andy Burnham	Diane Abbott
Julie Elliott	David Miliband	Andy Burnham	Ed Miliband	None	None
Louise Ellman	David Miliband	Andy Burnham	None	None	None
Natascha Engel	Ed Miliband	None	None	None	None
Bill Esterson	Ed Miliband	Andy Burnham	David Miliband	Ed Balls	Diane Abbott
Chris Evans	Ed Balls	David Miliband	Ed Miliband	Andy Burnham	None
Paul Farrelly	Ed Miliband	David Miliband	Andy Burnham	Ed Balls	Diane Abbott
Frank Field	Ed Miliband	Andy Burnham	None	None	None
Jim Fitzpatrick	David Miliband	None	None	None	None
Rob Flello	Andy Burnham	David Miliband	Ed Miliband	None	None
Caroline Flint	David Miliband	None	None	None	None
Paul Flynn	David Miliband	Andy Burnham	Diane Abbott	Ed Balls	Ed Miliband
Yvonne Fovargue	Andy Burnham	David Miliband	None	None	None
Hywel Francis	Ed Miliband	Ed Balls	None	None	None
Mike Gapes	David Miliband	Andy Burnham	Ed Balls	Ed Miliband	Diane Abbott
Barry Gardiner	David Miliband	Ed Miliband	None	None	None
Sheila Gilmore	David Miliband	Ed Miliband	Andy Burnham	Diane Abbott	Ed Balls
Pat Glass	David Miliband	Ed Balls	Andy Burnham	Ed Miliband	Diane Abbott
Mary Glindon	David Miliband	Andy Burnham	Ed Miliband	Ed Balls	Diane Abbott
Roger Godsiff	Ed Miliband	David Miliband	Andy Burnham	Ed Balls	Diane Abbott
Paul Goggins	Andy Burnham	David Miliband	None	None	None
Helen Goodman	Ed Miliband	None	None	None	None
Tom Greatrex	Ed Miliband	David Miliband	Andy Burnham	Ed Balls	None
Kate Green	Ed Balls	Ed Miliband	Andy Burnham	David Miliband	Diane Abbott
Lilian Greenwood	Ed Miliband	David Miliband	Ed Balls	Andy Burnham	Diane Abbott
Nia Griffith	Ed Balls	Ed Miliband	David Miliband	None	None
Andrew Gwynne	Ed Balls	Ed Miliband	David Miliband	Andy Burnham	Diane Abbott
Peter Hain	Ed Miliband	David Miliband	None	None	None
David Hamilton	Ed Miliband	Ed Balls	Andy Burnham	David Miliband	None
Fabian Hamilton	David Miliband	Ed Miliband	Andy Burnham	Ed Balls	None
David Hanson	David Miliband	Andy Burnham	Ed Miliband	Ed Balls	Diane Abbott
Harriet Harman	None	None	None	None	None
Tom Harris	David Miliband	None	None	None	None
Dai Havard	Ed Miliband	Ed Balls	None	None	None
John Healey	Ed Balls	Ed Miliband	None	None	None
Mark Hendrick	David Miliband	Ed Miliband	Andy Burnham	Ed Balls	Diane Abbott
Stephen Hepburn	Ed Balls	David Miliband	None	None	None
David Heyes	Andy Burnham	Ed Miliband	David Miliband	Ed Balls	Diane Abbott
Meg Hillier	David Miliband	Ed Balls	Andy Burnham	None	None
Julie Hilling	Andy Burnham	David Miliband	Ed Miliband	Ed Balls	Diane Abbott
Margaret Hodge	David Miliband	None	None	None	None
Sharon Hodgson	Ed Balls	Andy Burnham	Ed Miliband	David Miliband	Diane Abbott
Kate Hoey	Andy Burnham	Ed Miliband	David Miliband	None	None
Mary Honeyball MEP	David Miliband	Ed Miliband	Ed Balls	Andy Burnham	Diane Abbott
Jimmy Hood	Ed Miliband	Ed Balls	David Miliband	Andy Burnham	Diane Abbott
Kelvin Hopkins	Diane Abbott	Ed Miliband	Ed Balls	Andy Burnham	David Miliband
George Howarth	David Miliband	Ed Balls	None	None	None
Richard Howitt MEP	David Miliband	Ed Miliband	None	None	None
Lindsay Hoyle	Ed Balls	Ed Miliband	David Miliband	None	None
Stephen Hughes	Ed Miliband	David Miliband	Andy Burnham	None	None
Tristram Hunt	David Miliband	Ed Balls	Ed Miliband	Andy Burnham	Diane Abbott
Huw Irranca-Davies	David Miliband	Andy Burnham	Ed Miliband	Ed Balls	None
Glenda Jackson	Ed Miliband	Ed Balls	None	None	None
Siân James	Ed Miliband	Ed Balls	None	None	None
Cathy Jamieson	Ed Miliband	Andy Burnham	David Miliband	Ed Balls	Diane Abbott
Alan Johnson	David Miliband	None	None	None	None
Diana Johnson	Ed Balls	David Miliband	None	None	None
Graham Jones	Ed Miliband	Ed Balls	Andy Burnham	David Miliband	None
Helen Jones	Ed Balls	Ed Miliband	David Miliband	None	None
Kevan Jones	David Miliband	Andy Burnham	None	None	None
Susan Elan Jones	Ed Miliband	David Miliband	None	None	None
Tessa Jowell	David Miliband	Andy Burnham	Ed Miliband	Diane Abbott	Ed Balls
Eric Joyce	Ed Balls	Ed Miliband	Andy Burnham	David Miliband	Diane Abbott
Gerald Kaufman	David Miliband	Ed Miliband	Andy Burnham	Ed Balls	None
Barbara Keeley	Ed Balls	Ed Miliband	David Miliband	Andy Burnham	Diane Abbott
Alan Keen	Andy Burnham	Ed Miliband	David Miliband	Ed Balls	Diane Abbott
Liz Kendall	David Miliband	None	None	None	None
Sadiq Khan	Ed Miliband	None	None	None	None
David Lammy	David Miliband	Diane Abbott	Ed Balls	Ed Miliband	Andy Burnham
Ian Lavery	Ed Miliband	Andy Burnham	None	None	None
Mark Lazarowicz	Ed Miliband	None	None	None	None
Chris Leslie	Ed Balls	David Miliband	Ed Miliband	Andy Burnham	Diane Abbott
Ivan Lewis	David Miliband	None	None	None	None
Tony Lloyd	None	None	None	None	None
Andy Love	Ed Miliband	David Miliband	Ed Balls	Andy Burnham	Diane Abbott
Ian Lucas	Ed Miliband	Ed Balls	David Miliband	Andy Burnham	Diane Abbott
Denis MacShane	David Miliband	None	None	None	None
Fiona Mactaggart	David Miliband	Ed Balls	None	None	None
Khalid Mahmood	Ed Balls	Ed Miliband	Diane Abbott	David Miliband	Andy Burnham
Shabana Mahmood	Ed Miliband	None	None	None	None
John Mann	David Miliband	Ed Miliband	None	None	None
Gordon Marsden	Ed Miliband	David Miliband	Andy Burnham	Ed Balls	None
David Martin MEP	David Miliband	None	None	None	None
Linda McAvan MEP	Ed Miliband	None	None	None	None
Steve McCabe	Ed Balls	Ed Miliband	David Miliband	None	None
Michael McCann	David Miliband	None	None	None	None
Arlene McCarthy MEP	Ed Miliband	David Miliband	Andy Burnham	None	None
Kerry McCarthy	Ed Balls	David Miliband	None	None	None
Gregg McClymont	David Miliband	Ed Miliband	Ed Balls	Andy Burnham	Diane Abbott
Siobhain McDonagh	David Miliband	None	None	None	None
John McDonnell	Diane Abbott	None	None	None	None
Pat McFadden	David Miliband	None	None	None	None
Alison McGovern	David Miliband	Andy Burnham	Ed Miliband	Ed Balls	Diane Abbott
Jim McGovern	Ed Miliband	None	None	None	None
Anne McGuire	David Miliband	Ed Balls	Ed Miliband	Andy Burnham	Diane Abbott
Ann McKechin	Ed Miliband	Ed Balls	None	None	None
Catherine McKinnell	Ed Miliband	None	None	None	None
Michael Meacher	Ed Miliband	Diane Abbott	None	None	None
Alan Meale	Ed Miliband	David Miliband	Ed Balls	Andy Burnham	Diane Abbott
Ian Mearns	David Miliband	Ed Balls	Ed Miliband	Andy Burnham	Diane Abbott
Alun Michael	David Miliband	Ed Balls	Ed Miliband	Andy Burnham	Diane Abbott
David Miliband	David Miliband	Ed Miliband	None	None	None
Ed Miliband	Ed Miliband	David Miliband	None	None	None
Andrew Miller	Andy Burnham	David Miliband	Ed Miliband	Ed Balls	None
Austin Mitchell	Ed Miliband	David Miliband	Ed Balls	Diane Abbott	Andy Burnham
Madeleine Moon	Ed Miliband	Ed Balls	None	None	None
Claude Moraes MEP	David Miliband	None	None	None	None
Jessica Morden	David Miliband	Ed Miliband	Andy Burnham	Ed Balls	Diane Abbott
Graeme Morrice	Ed Miliband	None	None	None	None
Grahame Morris	Ed Miliband	Andy Burnham	Ed Balls	Diane Abbott	David Miliband
George Mudie	Ed Balls	Ed Miliband	None	None	None
Meg Munn	David Miliband	None	None	None	None
Jim Murphy	David Miliband	None	None	None	None
Paul Murphy	Ed Miliband	David Miliband	None	None	None
Ian Murray	David Miliband	Ed Miliband	Ed Balls	Andy Burnham	Diane Abbott
Lisa Nandy	Ed Miliband	Ed Balls	None	None	None
Pamela Nash	David Miliband	None	None	None	None
Fiona O'Donnell	David Miliband	Ed Miliband	Andy Burnham	Ed Balls	Diane Abbott
Chi Onwurah	Ed Miliband	David Miliband	Diane Abbott	None	None
Sandra Osborne	Ed Miliband	None	None	None	None
Albert Owen	Ed Miliband	Andy Burnham	David Miliband	Ed Balls	None
Teresa Pearce	Ed Balls	Ed Miliband	David Miliband	None	None
Toby Perkins	David Miliband	Ed Balls	Ed Miliband	Andy Burnham	Diane Abbott
Bridget Phillipson	David Miliband	None	None	None	None
Stephen Pound	Ed Miliband	Andy Burnham	David Miliband	Ed Balls	None
Dawn Primarolo	Ed Miliband	None	None	None	None
Yasmin Qureshi	David Miliband	None	None	None	None
Nick Raynsford	David Miliband	None	None	None	None
Jamie Reed	David Miliband	Ed Miliband	Andy Burnham	Ed Balls	None
Rachel Reeves	Ed Miliband	David Miliband	Ed Balls	Andy Burnham	Diane Abbott
Emma Reynolds	Ed Miliband	David Miliband	Ed Balls	Andy Burnham	Diane Abbott
Jonathan Reynolds	David Miliband	Ed Miliband	None	None	None
Linda Riordan	Diane Abbott	Ed Miliband	None	None	None
John Robertson	Ed Balls	Ed Miliband	David Miliband	Andy Burnham	Diane Abbott
Geoffrey Robinson	Ed Balls	David Miliband	Ed Miliband	Andy Burnham	Diane Abbott
Steve Rotheram	Andy Burnham	Ed Miliband	None	None	None
Frank Roy	David Miliband	None	None	None	None
Lindsay Roy	Ed Miliband	Ed Balls	David Miliband	None	None
Chris Ruane	David Miliband	Ed Miliband	Ed Balls	Andy Burnham	Diane Abbott
Joan Ruddock	Ed Miliband	None	None	None	None
Anas Sarwar	David Miliband	Ed Miliband	None	None	None
Alison Seabeck	Ed Miliband	None	None	None	None
Virendra Sharma	David Miliband	Ed Miliband	Ed Balls	Andy Burnham	Diane Abbott
Barry Sheerman	David Miliband	None	None	None	None
Jim Sheridan	Ed Miliband	None	None	None	None
Gavin Shuker	Ed Miliband	Ed Balls	None	None	None
Brian Simpson MEP	Andy Burnham	Ed Miliband	None	None	None
Marsha Singh	Ed Miliband	David Miliband	Ed Balls	None	None
Dennis Skinner	David Miliband	None	None	None	None
Peter Skinner MEP	David Miliband	None	None	None	None
Andy Slaughter	Ed Miliband	None	None	None	None
Andrew Smith	Ed Balls	David Miliband	Ed Miliband	Andy Burnham	None
Angela Smith	David Miliband	Andy Burnham	None	None	None
Nick Smith	David Miliband	Ed Balls	Ed Miliband	Andy Burnham	Diane Abbott
Owen Smith	Ed Miliband	Ed Balls	David Miliband	Andy Burnham	Diane Abbott
Peter Soulsby	David Miliband	Ed Miliband	Andy Burnham	Ed Balls	Diane Abbott
John Spellar	Ed Balls	David Miliband	Ed Miliband	Andy Burnham	None
Catherine Stihler MEP	Ed Miliband	David Miliband	Andy Burnham	Ed Balls	Diane Abbott
Jack Straw	David Miliband	Andy Burnham	Ed Balls	None	None
Graham Stringer	David Miliband	Andy Burnham	None	None	None
Gisela Stuart	David Miliband	None	None	None	None
Gerry Sutcliffe	Andy Burnham	David Miliband	Ed Balls	Ed Miliband	Diane Abbott
Mark Tami	David Miliband	Ed Balls	Andy Burnham	Ed Balls	Diane Abbott
Gareth Thomas	David Miliband	None	None	None	None
Emily Thornberry	Ed Miliband	None	None	None	None
Stephen Timms	Ed Miliband	David Miliband	Andy Burnham	Ed Balls	None
Jon Trickett	Ed Balls	Ed Miliband	David Miliband	Diane Abbott	None
Karl Turner	Andy Burnham	David Miliband	Ed Miliband	Ed Balls	Diane Abbott
Derek Twigg	Andy Burnham	David Miliband	Ed Balls	Ed Miliband	Diane Abbott
Stephen Twigg	David Miliband	Ed Miliband	None	None	None
Chuka Umunna	Ed Miliband	David Miliband	None	None	None
Derek Vaughan MEP	Ed Miliband	David Miliband	None	None	None
Keith Vaz	David Miliband	Ed Miliband	Ed Balls	Diane Abbott	Andy Burnham
Valerie Vaz	David Miliband	Diane Abbott	Ed Miliband	None	None
Joan Walley	Ed Miliband	Andy Burnham	None	None	None
Tom Watson	Ed Balls	Ed Miliband	Andy Burnham	David Miliband	Diane Abbott
Dave Watts	Andy Burnham	Ed Balls	Ed Miliband	Diane Abbott	David Miliband
Alan Whitehead	Ed Miliband	Andy Burnham	David Miliband	None	None
Malcolm Wicks	David Miliband	Ed Miliband	Andy Burnham	Ed Balls	Diane Abbott
Chris Williamson	Ed Miliband	Ed Balls	David Miliband	Andy Burnham	Diane Abbott
Glenis Willmott MEP	Ed Miliband	David Miliband	None	None	None
Phil Wilson	David Miliband	Andy Burnham	None	None	None
David Winnick	David Miliband	None	None	None	None
Rosie Winterton	Ed Miliband	None	None	None	None
Mike Wood	Diane Abbott	Ed Miliband	Ed Balls	None	None
John Woodcock	David Miliband	Andy Burnham	Ed Miliband	Ed Balls	None
Shaun Woodward	David Miliband	Ed Miliband	Ed Balls	Andy Burnham	Diane Abbott
Phil Woolas	David Miliband	None	None	None	None
David Wright	Ed Balls	David Miliband	Ed Miliband	Andy Burnham	None
Iain Wright	Ed Balls	Ed Miliband	Andy Burnham	David Miliband	Diane Abbott

=== Constituency Labour Parties ===
The map below shows the results of the Constituency Labour Parties' first round preferences in the leadership election by constituency, before votes were transferred due to eliminations. David Miliband took the most constituencies, winning 577 in total. He was followed by Ed Miliband who took sixty-seven constituencies. Andy Burnham won eight seats, all in north-west England, Ed Balls took two constituencies (his own, Morley & Outwood, and that of his wife, Yvette Cooper, Normanton, Pontefract and Castleford), and Diane Abbott won no constituencies. All ties with the exception of Wigan (Burnham and David Miliband) were between David and Ed Miliband. Northern Ireland was counted as one constituency.

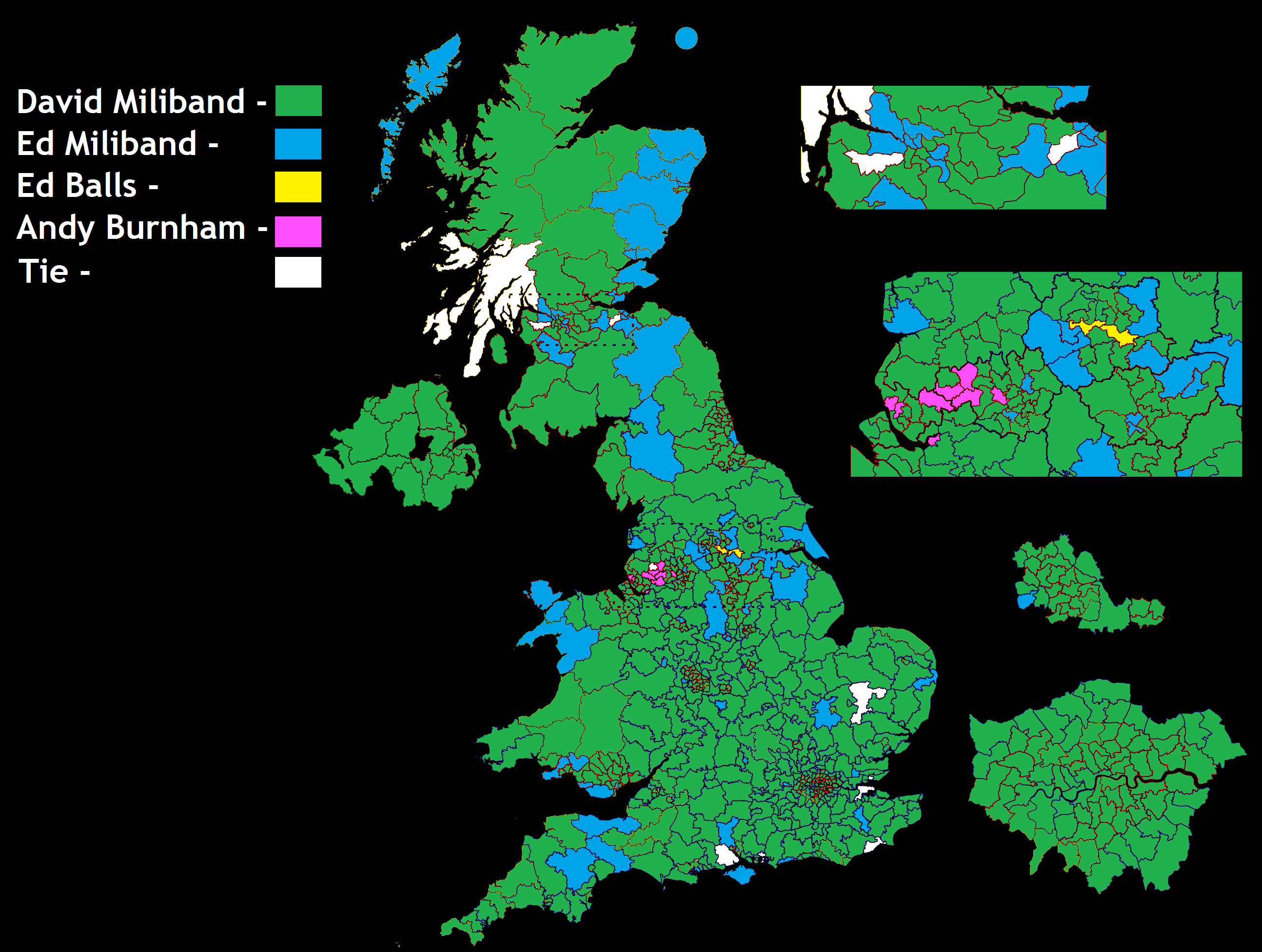
Green indicates constituencies won by David Miliband, light blue for Ed Miliband, pink for Andy Burnham, yellow for Ed Balls and white for a tie. (Click to enlarge)

=== Trade Unions and Socialist Societies ===
Name	Diane Abbott	Ed Balls	Andy Burnham	David Miliband	Ed Miliband
ASLEF	1,791	228	246	626	665
BECTU	588	194	210	715	697
BFAWU	178	152	154	484	231
Community	205	184	151	1,292	332
CWU	1,786	7,101	1,417	3,370	2,047
GMB	3,213	2,548	3,119	9,746	18,128
Musicians' Union	925	221	210	805	865
TSSA	898	285	296	923	544
UCATT	177	185	229	630	2,471
UNISON	2,910	2,141	2,343	6,665	9,652
Unite the Union	11,129	6,995	7,993	21,778	47,439
USDAW	1,279	788	881	8,264	1,661
BAME Labour	20	4	2	200	29
CSM	79	57	80	194	279
Fabian Society	308	313	281	1,461	1,321
LHG	16	15	16	33	41
LPDMG	5	4	2	11	20
Irish Society	11	5	2	20	16
Labour Students	117	86	116	402	379
LGBT Labour	55	17	29	193	136
Scientists for Labour	9	5	10	21	24
SERA	77	22	32	86	209
SEA	57	28	28	63	138
SHA	75	26	36	87	172
Labour Lawyers	25	14	15	83	66
Jewish Labour	5	0	6	37	24

Turnout in the affiliates section was 9.0%, with 247,339 votes cast of the 2,747,030 ballots distributed.

=== 2015 Labour Party leadership election ===
Candidate	Party members		Registered supporters		Affiliated supporters		Total	
Candidate	Votes	%	Votes	%	Votes	%	Votes	%
Jeremy Corbyn ✓	121,751	49.6	88,449	83.8	41,217	57.6	251,417	59.5
Andy Burnham	55,698	22.7	6,160	5.8	18,604	26.0	80,462	19.0
Yvette Cooper	54,470	22.2	8,415	8.0	9,043	12.6	71,928	17.0
Liz Kendall	13,601	5.5	2,574	2.4	2,682	3.8	18,857	4.5

Turnout for the vote was 422,871 (76.3%) of the 554,272 eligible voters, with 207 spoilt ballots. 343,995 votes (81.3%) were cast online, the UK's largest online ballot.

=== 2026 Labour Party leadership election ===
Burnham received 322 nominations on the day nominations opened, one short of the 323 that would mean no other candidate could receive enough nominations to challenge him. By convention, the outgoing party leader (Starmer), NEC chair (Shabana Mahmood) and party chair (Anna Turley) did not nominate anyone.

By 13 July he had received 349 PLP nominations, rising to 379 by 15 July. After the deadline had passed, Burnham was the only remaining candidate, and secured the nominations of 23 Labour Party affiliates; as there were no other eligible candidates by the affiliate deadline, Burnham was declared Leader of the Labour Party at a special party conference on 17th July.

List of MPs who nominated Andy Burnham (379)

By 9 July:

1. Debbie Abrahams, MP for Oldham East and Saddleworth
2. Zubir Ahmed, MP for Glasgow South West
3. Luke Akehurst, MP for North Durham
4. Bayo Alaba, MP for Southend East and Rochford
5. Dan Aldridge, MP for Weston-super-Mare
6. Douglas Alexander, MP for Lothian East
7. Heidi Alexander, MP for Swindon South
8. Sadik Al-Hassan, MP for North Somerset
9. Rushanara Ali, MP for Bethnal Green and Stepney
10. Rosena Allin-Khan, MP for Tooting
11. Callum Anderson, MP for Buckingham and Bletchley
12. Fleur Anderson, MP for Putney
13. Tonia Antoniazzi, MP for Gower
14. Scott Arthur, MP for Edinburgh South West
15. Jess Asato, MP for Lowestoft
16. Jas Athwal, MP for Ilford South
17. Catherine Atkinson, MP for Derby North
18. Lewis Atkinson, MP for Sunderland Central
19. Calvin Bailey, MP for Leyton and Wanstead
20. Olivia Bailey, MP for Reading West and Mid Berkshire
21. David Baines, MP for St Helens North
22. Alex Baker, MP for Aldershot
23. Richard Baker, MP for Glenrothes and Mid Fife
24. Alex Ballinger, MP for Halesowen
25. Antonia Bance, MP for Tipton and Wednesbury
26. Paula Barker, MP for Liverpool Wavertree
27. Lee Barron, MP for Corby and East Northamptonshire
28. Alex Barros-Curtis, MP for Cardiff West
29. Danny Beales, MP for Uxbridge and South Ruislip
30. Lorraine Beavers, MP for Blackpool North and Fleetwood
31. Torsten Bell, MP for Swansea West
32. Hilary Benn, MP for Leeds South
33. Clive Betts, MP for Sheffield South East
34. Polly Billington, MP for East Thanet
35. Matt Bishop, MP for Forest of Dean
36. Olivia Blake, MP for Sheffield Hallam
37. Rachel Blake, MP for Cities of London and Westminster
38. Chris Bloore, MP for Redditch
39. Elsie Blundell, MP for Heywood and Middleton North
40. Kevin Bonavia, MP for Stevenage
41. Jade Botterill, MP for Ossett and Denby Dale
42. Sureena Brackenridge, MP for Wolverhampton North East
43. Jonathan Brash, MP for Hartlepool
44. Chris Bryant, MP for Rhondda and Ogmore
45. Julia Buckley, MP for Shrewsbury
46. Maureen Burke, MP for Glasgow North East
47. Andy Burnham, MP for Makerfield
48. David Burton-Sampson, MP for Southend West and Leigh
49. Dawn Butler, MP for Brent East
50. Liam Byrne, MP for Birmingham Hodge Hill and Solihull North
51. Ruth Cadbury, MP for Brentford and Isleworth
52. Nesil Caliskan, MP for Barking
53. Irene Campbell, MP for North Ayrshire and Arran
54. Alan Campbell, MP for Tynemouth
55. Dan Carden, MP for Liverpool Walton
56. Sam Carling, MP for North West Cambridgeshire
57. Al Carns, MP for Birmingham Selly Oak
58. Sarah Champion, MP for Rotherham
59. Bambos Charalambous, MP for Southgate and Wood Green
60. Luke Charters, MP for York Outer
61. Feryal Clark, MP for Enfield North
62. Ben Coleman, MP for Chelsea and Fulham
63. Jacob Collier, MP for Burton and Uttoxeter
64. Lizzi Collinge, MP for Morecambe and Lunesdale
65. Liam Conlon, MP for Beckenham and Penge
66. Sarah Coombes, MP for West Bromwich
67. Andrew Cooper, MP for Mid Cheshire
68. Beccy Cooper, MP for Worthing West
69. Yvette Cooper, MP for Pontefract, Castleford and Knottingley
70. Deirdre Costigan, MP for Ealing Southall
71. Mary Creagh, MP for Coventry East
72. Stella Creasy, MP for Walthamstow
73. Torcuil Crichton, MP for Na h-Eileanan an Iar
74. Chris Curtis, MP for Milton Keynes North
75. Janet Daby, MP for Lewisham East
76. Nicholas Dakin, MP for Scunthorpe
77. Ashley Dalton, MP for West Lancashire
78. Emily Darlington, MP for Milton Keynes Central
79. Paul Davies, MP for Colne Valley
80. Shaun Davies, MP for Telford
81. Alex Davies-Jones, MP for Pontypridd
82. Marsha De Cordova, MP for Battersea
83. Kate Dearden, MP for Halifax
84. Tanmanjeet Singh Dhesi, MP for Slough
85. Jim Dickson, MP for Dartford
86. Anna Dixon, MP for Shipley
87. Samantha Dixon, MP for Chester North and Neston
88. Anneliese Dodds, MP for Oxford East
89. Helena Dollimore, MP for Hastings and Rye
90. Stephen Doughty, MP for Cardiff South and Penarth
91. Peter Dowd, MP for Bootle
92. Graeme Downie, MP for Dunfermline and Dollar
93. Angela Eagle, MP for Wallasey
94. Maria Eagle, MP for Liverpool Garston
95. Cat Eccles, MP for Stourbridge
96. Lauren Edwards, MP for Rochester and Strood
97. Clive Efford, MP for Eltham and Chislehurst
98. Damien Egan, MP for Bristol North East
99. Maya Ellis, MP for Ribble Valley
100. Chris Elmore, MP for Bridgend
101. Kirith Entwistle, MP for Bolton North East
102. Florence Eshalomi, MP for Vauxhall and Camberwell Green
103. Bill Esterson, MP for Sefton Central
104. Miatta Fahnbulleh, MP for Peckham
105. Hamish Falconer, MP for Lincoln
106. Linsey Farnsworth, MP for Amber Valley
107. Josh Fenton-Glynn, MP for Calder Valley
108. Mark Ferguson, MP for Gateshead Central and Whickham
109. Patricia Ferguson, MP for Glasgow West
110. Natalie Fleet, MP for Bolsover
111. Emma Foody, MP for Cramlington and Killingworth
112. Paul Foster, MP for South Ribble
113. Vicky Foxcroft, MP for Lewisham North
114. Mary Kelly Foy, MP for City of Durham
115. James Frith, MP for Bury North
116. Gill Furniss, MP for Sheffield Brightside and Hillsborough
117. Barry Gardiner, MP for Brent West
118. Allison Gardner, MP for Stoke-on-Trent South
119. Anna Gelderd, MP for South East Cornwall
120. Alan Gemmell, MP for Central Ayrshire
121. Tracy Gilbert, MP for Edinburgh North and Leith
122. Preet Kaur Gill, MP for Birmingham Edgbaston
123. Becky Gittins, MP for Clwyd East
124. Ben Goldsborough, MP for South Norfolk
125. Georgia Gould, MP for Queen's Park and Maida Vale
126. John Grady, MP for Glasgow East
127. Lilian Greenwood, MP for Nottingham South
128. Nia Griffith, MP for Llanelli
129. Louise Haigh, MP for Sheffield Heeley
130. Sarah Hall, MP for Warrington South
131. Fabian Hamilton, MP for Leeds North East
132. Paulette Hamilton, MP for Birmingham Erdington
133. Emma Hardy, MP for Kingston upon Hull West and Haltemprice
134. Lloyd Hatton, MP for South Dorset
135. Helen Hayes, MP for Dulwich and West Norwood
136. Tom Hayes, MP for Bournemouth East
137. Claire Hazelgrove, MP for Filton and Bradley Stoke
138. John Healey, MP for Rawmarsh and Conisbrough
139. Rachel Hopkins, MP for Luton South and South Bedfordshire
140. Claire Hughes, MP for Bangor Aberconwy
141. Alison Hume, MP for Scarborough and Whitby
142. Rupa Huq, MP for Ealing Central and Acton
143. Patrick Hurley, MP for Southport
144. Natasha Irons, MP for Croydon East
145. Sally Jameson, MP for Doncaster Central
146. Dan Jarvis, MP for Barnsley North
147. Terry Jermy, MP for South West Norfolk
148. Adam Jogee, MP for Newcastle-under-Lyme
149. Diana Johnson, MP for Kingston upon Hull North and Cottingham
150. Kim Johnson, MP for Liverpool Riverside
151. Darren Jones, MP for Bristol North West
152. Lillian Jones, MP for Kilmarnock and Loudoun
153. Ruth Jones, MP for Newport West and Islwyn
154. Sarah Jones, MP for Croydon West
155. Sojan Joseph, MP for Ashford
156. Warinder Juss, MP for Wolverhampton West
157. Chris Kane, MP for Stirling and Strathallan
158. Mike Kane, MP for Wythenshawe and Sale East
159. Satvir Kaur, MP for Southampton Test
160. Liz Kendall, MP for Leicester West
161. Afzal Khan, MP for Manchester Rusholme
162. Naushabah Khan, MP for Gillingham and Rainham
163. Stephen Kinnock, MP for Aberafan Maesteg
164. Sonia Kumar, MP for Dudley
165. Uma Kumaran, MP for Stratford and Bow
166. Peter Kyle, MP for Hove and Portslade
167. Laura Kyrke-Smith, MP for Aylesbury
168. Peter Lamb, MP for Crawley
169. David Lammy, MP for Tottenham
170. Ian Lavery, MP for Blyth and Ashington
171. Noah Law, MP for St Austell and Newquay
172. Kim Leadbeater, MP for Spen Valley
173. Emma Lewell, MP for South Shields
174. Andrew Lewin, MP for Welwyn Hatfield
175. Clive Lewis, MP for Norwich South
176. Simon Lightwood, MP for Wakefield and Rothwell
177. Rebecca Long-Bailey, MP for Salford
178. Josh MacAlister, MP for Whitehaven and Workington
179. Alice Macdonald, MP for Norwich North
180. Andy MacNae, MP for Rossendale and Darwen
181. Justin Madders, MP for Ellesmere Port and Bromborough
182. Seema Malhotra, MP for Feltham and Heston
183. Amanda Martin, MP for Portsmouth North
184. Rachael Maskell, MP for York Central
185. Keir Mather, MP for Selby
186. Douglas McAllister, MP for West Dunbartonshire
187. Kerry McCarthy, MP for Bristol East
188. Martin McCluskey, MP for Inverclyde and Renfrewshire West
189. Andy McDonald, MP for Middlesbrough and Thornaby East
190. Chris McDonald, MP for Stockton North
191. Blair McDougall, MP for East Renfrewshire
192. Lola McEvoy, MP for Darlington
193. Pat McFadden, MP for Wolverhampton South East
194. Alison McGovern, MP for Birkenhead
195. Alex McIntyre, MP for Gloucester
196. Gordon McKee, MP for Glasgow South
197. Kevin McKenna, MP for Sittingbourne and Sheppey
198. Catherine McKinnell, MP for Newcastle upon Tyne North
199. Jim McMahon, MP for Oldham West, Chadderton and Royton
200. Anna McMorrin, MP for Cardiff North
201. Frank McNally, MP for Coatbridge and Bellshill
202. Kirsty McNeill, MP for Midlothian
203. Anneliese Midgley, MP for Knowsley
204. Ed Miliband, MP for Doncaster North
205. Navendu Mishra, MP for Stockport
206. Abtisam Mohamed, MP for Sheffield Central
207. Stephen Morgan, MP for Portsmouth South
208. Grahame Morris, MP for Easington
209. Joe Morris, MP for Hexham
210. Luke Murphy, MP for Basingstoke
211. Chris Murray, MP for Edinburgh East and Musselburgh
212. Ian Murray, MP for Edinburgh South
213. James Murray, MP for Ealing North
214. James Naish, MP for Rushcliffe
215. Connor Naismith, MP for Crewe and Nantwich
216. Lisa Nandy, MP for Wigan
217. Kanishka Narayan, MP for Vale of Glamorgan
218. Pamela Nash, MP for Motherwell, Wishaw and Carluke
219. Josh Newbury, MP for Cannock Chase
220. Charlotte Nichols, MP for Warrington North
221. Alex Norris, MP for Nottingham North and Kimberley
222. Melanie Onn, MP for Great Grimsby and Cleethorpes
223. Chi Onwurah, MP for Newcastle upon Tyne Central and West
224. Simon Opher, MP for Stroud
225. Kate Osborne, MP for Jarrow and Gateshead East
226. Tristan Osborne, MP for Chatham and Aylesford
227. Taiwo Owatemi, MP for Coventry North West
228. Sarah Owen, MP for Luton North
229. Andrew Pakes, MP for Peterborough
230. Matthew Patrick, MP for Wirral West
231. Michael Payne, MP for Gedling
232. Stephanie Peacock, MP for Barnsley South
233. Jon Pearce, MP for High Peak
234. Matthew Pennycook, MP for Greenwich and Woolwich
235. Toby Perkins, MP for Chesterfield
236. Bridget Phillipson, MP for Houghton and Sunderland South
237. David Pinto-Duschinsky, MP for Hendon
238. Lee Pitcher, MP for Doncaster East and the Isle of Axholme
239. Jo Platt, MP for Leigh and Atherton
240. Luke Pollard, MP for Plymouth Sutton and Devonport
241. Joe Powell, MP for Kensington and Bayswater
242. Lucy Powell, MP for Manchester Central
243. Gregor Poynton, MP for Livingston
244. Peter Prinsley, MP for Bury St Edmunds and Stowmarket
245. Yasmin Qureshi, MP for Bolton South and Walkden
246. Steve Race, MP for Exeter
247. Connor Rand, MP for Altrincham and Sale West
248. Andrew Ranger, MP for Wrexham
249. Angela Rayner, MP for Ashton-under-Lyne
250. Ellie Reeves, MP for Lewisham West and East Dulwich
251. Rachel Reeves, MP for Leeds West and Pudsey
252. Emma Reynolds, MP for Wycombe
253. Jonathan Reynolds, MP for Stalybridge and Hyde
254. Martin Rhodes, MP for Glasgow North
255. Jake Richards, MP for Rother Valley
256. Jenny Riddell-Carpenter, MP for Suffolk Coastal
257. Lucy Rigby, MP for Northampton North
258. Dave Robertson, MP for Lichfield
259. Tim Roca, MP for Macclesfield
260. Matt Rodda, MP for Reading Central
261. Sam Rushworth, MP for Bishop Auckland
262. Sarah Russell, MP for Congleton
263. Tom Rutland, MP for East Worthing and Shoreham
264. Oliver Ryan, MP for Burnley
265. Sarah Sackman, MP for Finchley and Golders Green
266. Jeevun Sandher, MP for Loughborough
267. Naz Shah, MP for Bradford West
268. Baggy Shanker, MP for Derby South
269. Michael Shanks, MP for Rutherglen
270. Andy Slaughter, MP for Hammersmith and Chiswick
271. David Smith, MP for North Northumberland
272. Jeff Smith, MP for Manchester Withington
273. Sarah Smith, MP for Hyndburn
274. Karin Smyth, MP for Bristol South
275. Gareth Snell, MP for Stoke-on-Trent Central
276. Alex Sobel, MP for Leeds Central and Headingley
277. Euan Stainbank, MP for Falkirk
278. Jo Stevens, MP for Cardiff East
279. Kenneth Stevenson, MP for Airdrie and Shotts
280. Elaine Stewart, MP for Ayr, Carrick and Cumnock
281. Will Stone, MP for Swindon North
282. Alistair Strathern, MP for Hitchin
283. Wes Streeting, MP for Ilford North
284. Alan Strickland, MP for Newton Aycliffe and Spennymoor
285. Lauren Sullivan, MP for Gravesham
286. Kirsteen Sullivan, MP for Bathgate and Linlithgow
287. Peter Swallow, MP for Bracknell
288. Mark Tami, MP for Alyn and Deeside
289. Alison Taylor, MP for Paisley and Renfrewshire North
290. Rachel Taylor, MP for North Warwickshire and Bedworth
291. Fred Thomas, MP for Plymouth Moor View
292. Gareth Thomas, MP for Harrow West
293. Nick Thomas-Symonds, MP for Torfaen
294. Adam Thompson, MP for Erewash
295. Emily Thornberry, MP for Islington South and Finsbury
296. Marie Tidball, MP for Penistone and Stocksbridge
297. Stephen Timms, MP for East Ham
298. Dan Tomlinson, MP for Chipping Barnet
299. Henry Tufnell, MP for Mid and South Pembrokeshire
300. Matt Turmaine, MP for Watford
301. Laurence Turner, MP for Birmingham Northfield
302. Derek Twigg, MP for Widnes and Halewood
303. Liz Twist, MP for Blaydon and Consett
304. Harpreet Uppal, MP for Huddersfield
305. Tony Vaughan, MP for Folkestone and Hythe
306. Valerie Vaz, MP for Walsall and Bloxwich
307. Christian Wakeford, MP for Bury South
308. Melanie Ward, MP for Cowdenbeath and Kirkcaldy
309. Paul Waugh, MP for Rochdale
310. Chris Webb, MP for Blackpool South
311. Michelle Welsh, MP for Sherwood Forest
312. Andrew Western, MP for Stretford and Urmston
313. Michael Wheeler, MP for Worsley and Eccles
314. Jo White, MP for Bassetlaw
315. Katie White, MP for Leeds North West
316. David Williams, MP for Stoke-on-Trent North
317. Sean Woodcock, MP for Banbury
318. Rosie Wrighting, MP for Kettering
319. Yuan Yang, MP for Earley and Woodley
320. Mohammad Yasin, MP for Bedford
321. Steve Yemm, MP for Mansfield
322. Daniel Zeichner, MP for Cambridge

By 13 July:

1. Jack Abbott, MP for Ipswich
2. Tahir Ali, MP for Birmingham Hall Green and Moseley
3. Richard Burgon, MP for Leeds East
4. Ian Byrne, MP for Liverpool West Derby
5. Juliet Campbell, MP for Broxtowe
6. Catherine Fookes, MP for Monmouthshire
7. Gill German, MP for Clwyd North
8. Amanda Hack, MP for North West Leicestershire
9. Meg Hillier, MP for Hackney South and Shoreditch
10. Imran Hussain, MP for Bradford East
11. Louise Sandher-Jones, MP for North East Derbyshire
12. Jayne Kirkham, MP for Truro and Falmouth
13. Margaret Mullane, MP for Dagenham and Rainham
14. Katrina Murray, MP for Cumbernauld and Kirkintilloch
15. Kate Osamor, MP for Edmonton and Winchmore Hill
16. Darren Paffey, MP for Southampton Itchen
17. Jess Phillips, MP for Birmingham Yardley
18. Mike Reader, MP for Northampton South
19. Steve Reed, MP for Streatham and Croydon North
20. Michelle Scrogham, MP for Barrow and Furness
21. Mike Tapp, MP for Dover and Deal
22. David Taylor, MP for Hemel Hempstead
23. Chris Vince, MP for Harlow
24. Imogen Walker, MP for Hamilton and Clyde Valley
25. Chris Ward, MP for Brighton Kemptown and Peacehaven
26. Catherine West, MP for Hornsey and Friern Barnet
27. John Whitby, MP for Derbyshire Dales

By 14 July:

1. James Asser, MP for West Ham and Beckton
2. Markus Campbell-Savours, MP for Penrith and Solway
3. Pam Cox, MP for Colchester
4. Jen Craft, MP for Thurrock
5. Judith Cummins, MP for Bradford South
6. Jonathan Davies, MP for Mid Derbyshire
7. Josh Dean, MP for Hertford and Stortford
8. Sarah Edwards, MP for Tamworth
9. Chris Evans MP for Caerphilly
10. Mark Hendrick, MP for Preston
11. Sharon Hodgson, MP for Washington and Gateshead South
12. Gerald Jones, MP for Merthyr Tydfil and Aberdare
13. Gen Kitchen, MP for Wellingborough and Rushden
14. Brian Leishman, MP for Alloa and Grangemouth
15. Jessica Morden, MP for Newport East
16. Luke Myer, MP for Middlesbrough South and East Cleveland
17. Abena Oppong-Asare, MP for Erith and Thamesmead
18. Marie Rimmer, MP for St Helens South and Whiston
19. Cat Smith, MP for Lancaster and Wyre
20. Steve Witherden, MP for Montgomeryshire and Glyndŵr

By 15 July (close of nominations):

1. Johanna Baxter, MP for Paisley and Renfrewshire South
2. Daniel Francis, MP for Bexleyheath and Crayford
3. Jodie Gosling, MP for Nuneaton
4. Jonathan Hinder, MP for Pendle and Clitheroe
5. Leigh Ingham, MP for Stafford
6. Gurinder Singh Josan, MP for Smethwick
7. Julie Minns, MP for Carlisle
8. Mark Sewards, MP for Leeds South West and Morley
9. Tulip Siddiq, MP for Hampstead and Highgate
10. Matt Western, MP for Warwick and Leamington
List of MPs who nominated Catherine West (1)

On 14 July:

1. Neil Coyle, MP for Bermondsey and Old Southwark
List of MPs who did not endorse a candidate (23)
1. Apsana Begum, MP for Poplar and Limehouse
2. Phil Brickell, MP for Bolton West
3. Tom Collins, MP for Worcester
4. Neil Duncan-Jordan, MP for Poole
5. Mary Glindon, MP for Newcastle upon Tyne East and Wallsend
6. Carolyn Harris, MP for Neath and Swansea East
7. Chris Hinchliff, MP for North East Hertfordshire
8. Alex Mayer, MP for Dunstable and Leighton Buzzard
9. Siobhain McDonagh, MP for Mitcham and Morden
10. John McDonnell, MP for Hayes and Harlington
11. Perran Moon, MP for Camborne and Redruth
12. Samantha Niblett, MP for South Derbyshire
13. Richard Quigley, MP for Isle of Wight West
14. Bell Ribeiro-Addy, MP for Clapham and Brixton Hill
15. John Slinger, MP for Rugby
16. Nick Smith, MP for Blaenau Gwent and Rhymney
17. Graham Stringer, MP for Blackley and Middleton South
18. Jessica Toale, MP for Bournemouth West
19. Jon Trickett, MP for Normanton and Hemsworth
20. Nadia Whittome, MP for Nottingham East

Did not endorse due to Labour party convention:

1. Shabana Mahmood, MP for Birmingham Ladywood (Note: Due to being the NEC chair)
2. Keir Starmer, MP for Holborn and St Pancras (Note: Due to being the outgoing party leader)
3. Anna Turley, MP for Redcar (Note: Due to being Chair of the Labour Party)
List of Labour Party affiliates who nominated Andy Burnham (23)
1. Labour Party Irish Society
2. UNISON
3. ASLEF
4. TSSA
5. Community
6. USDAW
7. Communication Workers Union
8. GMB
9. Musician's Union
10. National Union of Mineworkers
11. Unite
12. East and South East Asians for Labour
13. Christians on the Left
14. Disability Labour
15. Jewish Labour Movement
16. Labour Business
17. Labour Campaign for International Development
18. Labour Housing Group
19. Labour Movement for Europe
20. Scientists for Labour
21. Socialist Environment and Resources Association
22. Labour in Local and Regional Government
23. Fire Brigades Union

Candidate	First stage Parliamentary Labour Party members			Second stage Labour Party affiliates		
Candidate	Nominations	%		Nominations	%	
Andy Burnham	379 / 403	94%	✓	23 / 33	69.7%	✓
Catherine West (eliminated)	1 / 403	0.2%	✗			
Total nominations	380 / 403	94.3%		23 / 33	69.7%	
