= Backbencher =

Parliamentarian who neither holds ministerial office nor shadows a minister

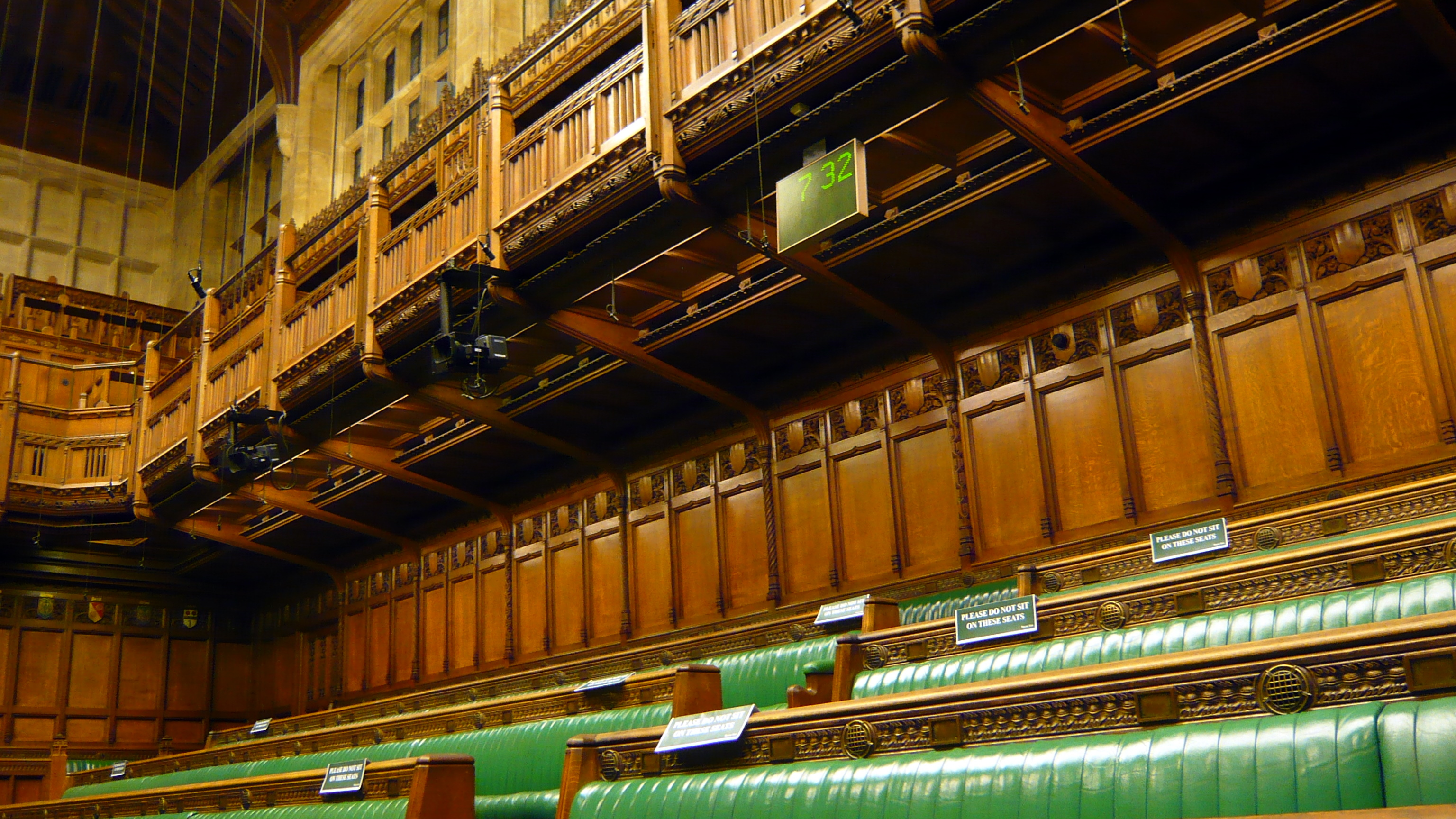
Opposition backbenches in the British House of Commons chamber

In Westminster and other parliamentary systems, a backbencher is a member of parliament (MP) or a legislator who occupies no governmental office and is not a frontbench spokesperson in the Opposition, being instead simply a member of the "rank and file".

The term "backbencher" dates from 1855, and is derived from the benches at the back of the British House of Commons, where non-ministerial MPs sit. A backbencher may be a new parliamentary member yet to receive a high office, a senior figure dropped from government, someone who for whatever reason is not chosen to sit in the government or an opposition spokesperson (such as a shadow cabinet if one exists), or someone who prefers to be a background influence, not in the spotlight.

In most parliamentary systems, individual backbenchers have little power to affect government policy. However, they play a greater role in the work of the legislature itself; for example, sitting on parliamentary committees, where legislation is considered and parliamentary work is done in more detail than there is time for on the floor of the House. In addition, since backbenchers generally form the vast majority of government MPs – and even their totality in dualistic parliamentary systems, where ministers cannot serve as MPs simultaneously-collectively they can sometimes exercise considerable power, especially in cases where the policies of the government are unpopular or when a governing party or coalition is internally split. Government backbenchers carry considerable influence when they are in a party with a small majority.

In some legislative assemblies, sitting at the back of the chamber is not necessarily associated with having a minor role. In Switzerland, senior figures sit in the back rows in order to have a better overview and be closer to the doors for discussions outside the plenary. In Germany, the party leaders sit in the front row, but there are no designated places for other senior figures. The term backbenchers ("Hinterbänkler") therefore refers to largely unknown MPs without much influence, regardless of where they sit. Originally, the importance of the front rows for the leaders had also to do with the fact that acoustics were often unsatisfactory before microphones were introduced. Prominent or iconic political figures can also play a backbench role, as the case of Aung San Suu Kyi illustrates: the leader of Myanmar's opposition to military rule was first elected MP in 2012 but proved only marginally involved in legislative business.

The term "backbencher" has also been adopted outside parliamentary systems, such as the United States Congress. While legislative branches in presidential systems do not share the firm front bench/back bench dichotomy of the Westminster system, the term has been used to denote junior legislators or legislators who are not part of party leadership within a legislative body.

== By country ==
=== United Kingdom ===
The most important backbench role is that of a constituency representative; constituents rely heavily on their MPs to represent them in parliament and make sure their concerns are heard, whether or not they voted for the MP representing them. Constituents may email and meet their MPs, raising the issues and concerns they want the government to hear. Backbenchers have an opportunity to raise their constituents' concerns directly to the prime minister in Prime Minister's Questions.

Backbenchers also have an unofficial agenda-setting power, with Opposition Day debates, private member's bills, and Prime Minister's Questions available to place items on the parliamentary agenda which are awkward for the government. The Wright Committee reforms introduced in the UK provided backbenchers with much more power in committees, giving Parliament greater control of its agenda, and increasing backbench membership in committees vastly.

Additionally, the Commons Backbench Business Committee was created in 2010 with cross-party support. It debates matters unlikely to be debated in government time, with each decision voted upon formally. By the end of 2010 coalition government it had undergone 300 debates, ranging from prisoner voting rights to the Hillsborough disaster. Furthermore, they have influence as discussed above when they are a member of a committee, these committees provide a perfect opportunity for backbenchers to have their voices heard in the legislative process. It usually proves difficult for backbenchers to be involved and have direct input in the legislative process when they are not involved in these activities.

=== Singapore ===
Traditionally, as the PAP has been the largest party in Singapore, there are many MPs who serve as backbenchers for the PAP. Often, these MPs sit near the back of parliament and are candidates in GRCs, where they contest in a team led by a PAP minister.

== See also ==
- Crossbencher
- House of Commons of the United Kingdom
