= Chris Green (politician) =

British politician (born 1973)

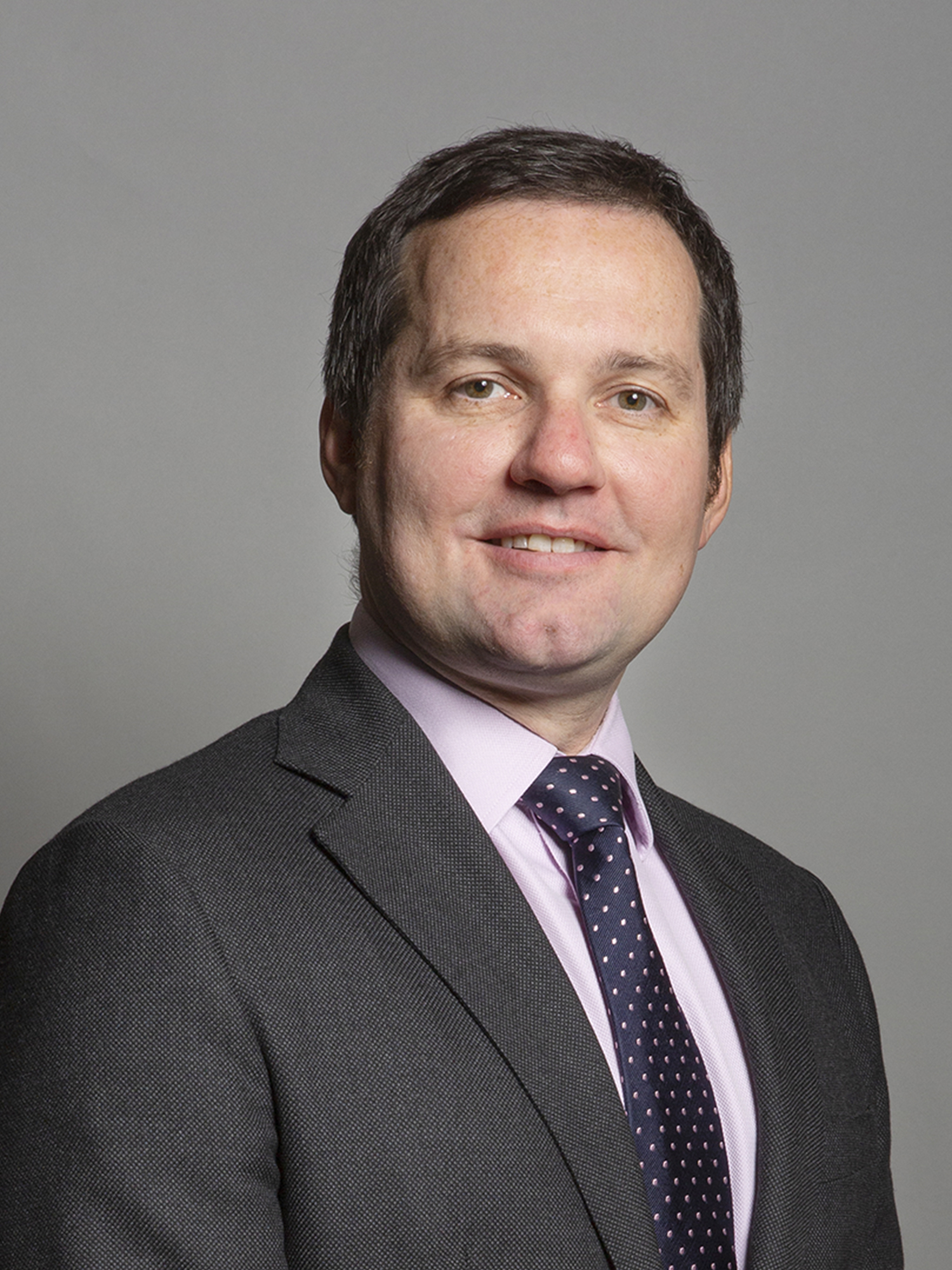

Member of Parliament for Bolton West
- In office 7 May 2015 – 30 May 2024
- Preceded by: Julie Hilling
- Succeeded by: Phil Brickell

Personal details
- Born: 12 August 1973 (age 53) Northern Ireland
- Party: Reform UK (from December 2025)
- Other political affiliations: Conservative (until December 2025)
- Occupation: Politician
- Website: Official website

Christopher Patrick James Green (born 12 August 1973) is a British politician who served as the Member of Parliament (MP) for Bolton West from the 2015 general election until 2024. He was re-elected in 2017 and 2019, increasing his majority and vote share at both general elections. Green lost his seat to the Labour Party in the 2024 general election, and later defected from the Conservative Party to Reform UK in December 2025.

In August 2019, he was appointed as a Parliamentary Private Secretary in the Department for Education. Following the 2019 general election, he was appointed as a Parliamentary Private Secretary to Baroness Evans, Leader of the House of Lords and Lord Privy Seal. He stepped down from this position on 13 October 2020 due to his disagreement with the government's approach to coronavirus restrictions and was a steering committee member of the lockdown-sceptic COVID Recovery Group, a group of Conservative MPs who opposed the UK government's December 2020 lockdown.

== Early life ==
Green was born on 12 August 1973 in Northern Ireland during The Troubles, while his father served with the British Army. He moved back to Liverpool where his father worked in catering and his mother was employed as a school dinner lady. He attended school in Liverpool before completing a Higher National Diploma qualification in physics. Green received an Honorary Doctorate from the Chancellor at the University of Bolton in 2021.

Prior to being elected, Green worked as an engineer in the mass spectrometry industry for 20 years. Before beginning his career as an engineer, Green worked in a variety of low-paid temporary jobs, including as a vehicle mechanic, in a picture frame factory and at a bookies.

== Political career ==
Prior to winning Bolton West, Green had contested Manchester Withington at the 2010 general election, coming third with 11.1% of the vote.

At the 2015 general election, Green regained the Bolton West constituency for the Conservatives with a majority of 801 votes, the seat having been held by Labour since 1997. With the inclusion of the Borough of Wigan ward of Atherton within the constituency in 2010, he is the first Conservative MP to represent a seat in the Wigan area since 1974.

At the 2017 general election he increased his majority and vote share. In the 2019 general election, his majority grew to 8,855 votes, an increase of 7.4% on the 2017 general election.

In 2016, he introduced a Private Member's Bill, Representation of the People (Voter Proof of Identity), requiring those on the electoral register to produce proof of identity at polling stations before voting to combat electoral fraud. The policy was later included in the 2017 Conservative manifesto.

During the 2015–2017 Session of Parliament, Green was elected to serve on the Science and Technology Select Committee. In 2017, he was elected to serve on the Work and Pensions Select Committee. He formerly sat on the Home Affairs Select Committee prior to the 2019 general election and was a member of the Backbench Business Committee from March 2022.

On 3 February 2016, Green held a Westminster Hall debate on Government investment in cycling. The preceding online digital debate, also held by Green, reached more than 2.1 million Twitter accounts—the highest number ever for a House of Commons digital debate.

During the 2016 EU Referendum, he supported Brexit, arguing as follows: "It is clear to me that the European Union will not reform and so I believe the United Kingdom should once again become an independent sovereign state".

In Parliament, Green campaigned on funding for refuge services and better transport links for his constituency. He was also vocal in his opposition to building on greenfield land, campaigning against proposals to build on the Hulton Park Estate in his constituency. Conversely, he campaigned for the delivery of the proposed Westhoughton bypass, for which plans date back to the immediate post-war period. It is thought that this bypass would ease traffic between Bolton and Wigan and reduce congestion in Daisy Hill, along with providing a more appropriate route for HGVs to reach the M61 from Atherleigh Way, but it would be built on undeveloped parkland.

Green also pushed for the development of the Loco Works spine road as part of his plan to improve local transport infrastructure. He secured £12 million of funding from the then Secretary of State for Housing, Communities and Local Government, Sajid Javid, to deliver the road, which would potentially provide the main access point for vehicles entering the 1,700 home Rivington Chase development and link the site with Middlebrook retail park, Horwich Parkway railway station and Junction 6 of the M61.

Green campaigned for the long-awaited construction of Junction 7 of the M61 as a means of alleviating congestion within Horwich, raising the issue with the Department for Transport and in parliamentary debates.

Green advocates a greater role for nuclear energy within the UK energy system, with a particular focus on the delivery of small modular reactors. He made the case for affordable, reliable sources of energy to power the UK's manufacturing sector.

Green takes a keen interest in the work of Greater Manchester Police and repeatedly raised concerns in Parliament about GMP's £70 million bespoke Integrated Police Operating System, including with the Prime Minister in February 2020. Following interventions from Green, Her Majesty's Inspectorate of Constabulary were ordered to conduct an independent review of the system. In March 2022, the Chief Constable of GMP announced that a key element of IOPS would be replaced with existing technology used by other police forces.

In January 2018, he was appointed Parliamentary Private Secretary (PPS) to the Department for Transport, but resigned from this post on 9 July 2018 over the government's Brexit position. On 16 November 2018, Green confirmed that he had submitted a letter calling for a vote of no confidence in the Prime Minister Theresa May.

In August 2019, Green was appointed as a Parliamentary Private Secretary in the Department for Education following the election of Boris Johnson as Conservative Party leader and Prime Minister. His role was to assist education ministers in policymaking and to liaise between the department and backbenchers". Green became Parliamentary Private Secretary to Baroness Evans, Leader of the House of Lords and Lord Privy Seal after the 2019 general election.

He stepped down from this position on 13 October 2020 due to his disagreement with the government's approach to coronavirus restrictions. He then joined the All-Party Parliamentary Group for Pandemic Response and Recovery.

Green involved himself in medical research and healthcare-related matters in Parliament. As Chairman of the influential All-Party Parliamentary Group on Healthcare Infrastructure, he oversaw a body of work on NHS infrastructure needs to which former Health Secretaries Andy Burnham and Stephen Dorrell contributed evidence. He was also Chairman of the APPG on Medical Research and Vice-Chair of the APPG for Life Sciences.

In the 2017–19 parliamentary session, Green introduced a Private Member's Bill which sought to place the Forensic Science Regulator on a statutory footing, to enforce an industry code of practice for public and private forensics provision. The Bill received government support but fell when parliament was dissolved for the 2019 general election, due to constraints on the parliamentary timetable. Subsequent to this, Green worked with colleagues across the aisle to deliver this important legislation when an almost identical Bill, tabled by another Member of Parliament, came before the House of Commons.

In July 2022, Green was elected to the ruling executive of the 1922 Committee, which represents the views of Conservative backbench MPs to the Government. As part of the role, he chaired the 1922 backbench health committee. He also sat on the executive committee of the Northern Research Group – a caucus of MPs representing constituencies in the North of England and advocating for the region.

He stood for re-election as MP for Bolton West in the 2024 General Election but lost the seat to Phil Brickell, the Labour candidate, coming in second place with 12,418 votes (27.8%).

== Personal life ==
Green is a keen runner, having taken part in the 2017, 2018, 2019 and 2021 London Marathons to raise funds for Bolton Hospice, Fortalice – a women's refuge in Bolton – Derian House Children's Hospice and Urban Outreach.

== Controversies ==
In July 2020, Green apologised after he retweeted a poem which referenced antisemitic tropes about a 'New World Order' and the Rothschild family.

Parliament of the United Kingdom
Preceded by Julie Hilling	Member of Parliament for Bolton West; 2015–2024	Succeeded by Phil Brickell
