= Patricia Gibson =

Scottish politician (born 1968)

Patricia Gibson MSP
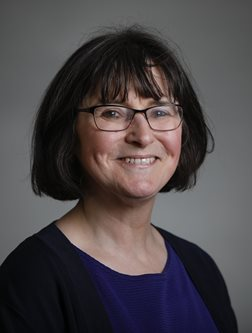
- Official portrait, 2026

SNP Attorney General Spokesperson in the House of Commons
- In office 4 September 2023 – 5 July 2024
- Leader: Stephen Flynn
- Preceded by: Angela Crawley (2022)

SNP Spokesperson for Environment, Food and Rural Affairs in the House of Commons
- In office 10 December 2022 – 4 September 2023
- Leader: Stephen Flynn
- Preceded by: Deidre Brock
- Succeeded by: Steven Bonnar

SNP Spokesperson for Housing, Communities and Local Government in the House of Commons
- In office 1 February 2021 – 10 December 2022
- Leader: Ian Blackford
- Preceded by: David Linden
- Succeeded by: Chris Stephens

SNP Spokesperson for Consumer Affairs in the House of Commons
- In office 20 June 2017 – 10 December 2022
- Leader: Ian Blackford
- Preceded by: Office established
- Succeeded by: Office abolished

Member of Parliament for North Ayrshire and Arran
- In office 7 May 2015 – 30 May 2024
- Preceded by: Katy Clark
- Succeeded by: Irene Campbell

Member of the Scottish Parliament for Cunninghame South
- Incumbent
- Assumed office 7 May 2026
- Preceded by: Ruth Maguire
- Majority: 4,167 (14.8%)

Personal details
- Born: 12 May 1968 (age 58) Glasgow, Scotland
- Party: Scottish National Party
- Spouse: Kenneth Gibson
- Education: University of Glasgow

Patricia Gibson (born 12 May 1968) is a Scottish National Party (SNP) politician who has served as a Member of the Scottish Parliament for Cunninghame South since May 2026. She had also been the SNP Attorney General Spokesperson from September 2023 to July 2024. She served as the SNP Shadow Secretary of State for Housing, Communities and Local Government from 2021 to 2022. She was the Member of Parliament (MP) for North Ayrshire and Arran 2015–2024.

== Early life and career ==
Patricia Gibson was born and educated in Glasgow. She received a BA (Hons) and MA (Hons) in English and Politics from the University of Glasgow. After graduation, she taught English for over twenty years.

== Political career ==
In 2007, Gibson was elected to the Glasgow City Council as a councillor for the Greater Pollok ward, on which she served until 2012. While on the council, she was the SNP's spokesperson for education on the Glasgow city council.

At the 2010 general election, Gibson stood as the SNP candidate in North Ayrshire and Arran, coming second with 25.9% of the vote behind the incumbent Labour MP Katy Clark.

== Parliamentary career ==
At the 2015 election, Gibson was elected to Parliament as MP for North Ayrshire and Arran with 53.2% of the vote and a majority of 13,573.

Between July 2015 and May 2017 Gibson was a member of the Procedure Committee.

Gibson was re-elected as MP for North Ayrshire & Arran at the snap 2017 general election with a decreased vote share of 38.9% and a decreased majority of 3,633.

In June 2017 she was appointed the SNP spokesperson for Consumer Affairs. Between September 2017 and 6 November 2019, Gibson was a member of the Backbench Business Committee.

At the 2019 general election, Gibson was again re-elected, with an increased vote share of 48.5% and an increased majority of 8,521.

Since March 2020, she had been a member of the Backbench Business Committee.

During her time as an MP, Gibson was an active campaigner on behalf of Women Against State Pension Inequality. She was later presented with a WASPI Hero Award by the Ayrshire WASPI group.

In June 2022, Gibson was cleared, on appeal, of sexual misconduct against a parliamentary staff member which had initially been upheld by the Independent Complaints and Grievance Scheme (ICGS). The appeal report concluded that the original investigation "was materially flawed in a way that affected the decision of the Commissioner."

At the 2024 general election, Gibson lost her North Ayrshire and Arran seat to Irene Campbell of the Labour Party.

She was selected as the candidate for Cunninghame South in the 2026 Scottish Parliament election.

== Personal life ==
Gibson lives in Kilbirnie, North Ayrshire which is within her parliamentary constituency.

She is married to Kenneth Gibson, the Presiding Officer of the Scottish Parliament.

Parliament of the United Kingdom
Preceded by Katy Clark	Member of Parliament for North Ayrshire and Arran; 2015–2024	Succeeded by Irene Campbell
