= Julie Hilling =

British politician (born 1955)

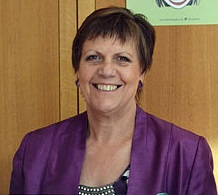
- Hilling in 2013

Member of Parliament for Bolton West
- In office 6 May 2010 – 30 March 2015
- Preceded by: Ruth Kelly
- Succeeded by: Christopher Green

Personal details
- Born: 29 April 1955 (age 70) Oxford, England
- Party: Labour

Julie Ann Hilling (born 29 April 1955) is a British Labour Party politician, who was the Member of Parliament (MP) for Bolton West from 2010 until 2015.

== Background ==
Hilling was born in Oxford and lived there until the age of 9 when her family moved to Leighton Buzzard. She attended The Cedars School before studying Chemistry at the University of Nottingham and then attaining a Diploma in Youth and Community Work at Manchester Polytechnic. She has lived in Atherton, which became part of the Bolton West constituency at the 2010 General Election, for 24 years.

== Early career ==
Hilling has worked as a Youth Worker in Nottingham, St Helens and Wigan, the latter for 18 years. She became President of the Community and Youth Workers' Union in 1991, a post she held until 1999. Ms Hilling was a North West Learning Organiser for the NASUWT 2004–2006 and, before entering politics, worked as a Senior Regional Organiser for the Transport Salaried Staffs Association (TSSA).

== Political career ==
Hilling was elected as the Member of Parliament for Bolton West in May 2010 with a majority of just 92 votes (0.19%), in a seat the Conservatives had targeted since the previous incumbent Ruth Kelly had become embroiled in the expenses scandal.

She was appointed as Parliamentary Private Secretary to Yvette Cooper in her role as Shadow Women's and Equalities Minister in October 2010, the same month that she became a member of the Transport Select Committee. Hilling was appointed chair of the all-party Rail in the North group of MPs. Julie also served on the Standards and Privileges Select Committee and is a member of the All Party Parliamentary Groups on Rail, Youth Affairs, Children, Community & Voluntary Sector and Save The Pub. Hilling was promoted to join the Whips office in June 2012.

Hilling launched a campaign to promote Emergency Life Skills (ELS) and pressed the Government to introduce it into the national curriculum. She linked up with Bolton Wanderers Community Trust, North West Ambulance Service as well as the British Heart Foundation to push for every school leaver in Bolton West to become trained in CPR and ELS. Throughout 2013, Hilling actively campaigned on dangerous dogs, following the death of 14-year-old constituent Jade Lomas-Anderson, in Atherton. She joined other MPs in a nationwide campaign to present a petition alongside Jade's parents to 10 Downing Street, before presenting it in the House of Commons. She also sought to make amendments to the recent Anti-Social Behaviour, Crime and Policing Bill to include preventative measures such as Dog Control Notices and to control the number of dogs in a household.

In her Bolton West Constituency, Hilling lead campaigned against the Bedroom Tax and for lower Energy Bills.

Hilling lost her seat at the 2015 election by 801 votes, and was selected to contest the seat again at the snap 2017 general election. She lost again, with the incumbent Conservative, Chris Green, increasing his majority to 936. Hilling was chosen to contest Bolton West for Labour at the 2019 election but lost the seat for a third time in 2019, when Chris Green increased his majority by almost 8,000 votes.

Parliament of the United Kingdom
Preceded by Ruth Kelly	Member of Parliament for Bolton West; 2010–2015	Succeeded by Chris Green
