= Jack Abbott (politician) =

British Labour Party politician

Jack Abbott MP
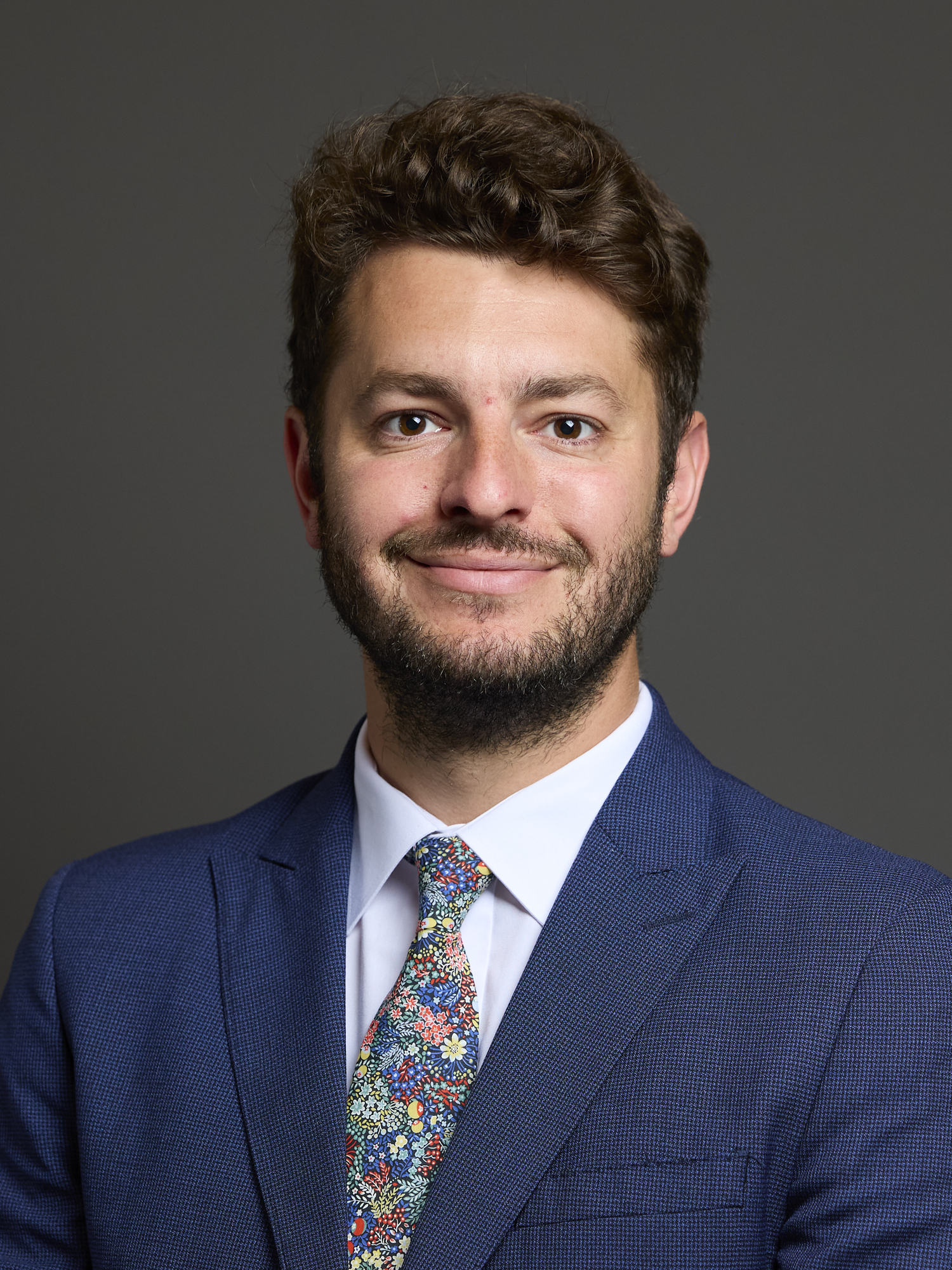
- Official portrait, 2024

Member of Parliament for Ipswich
- Incumbent
- Assumed office 4 July 2024
- Preceded by: Tom Hunt
- Majority: 7,403 (19.6%)

Member of Suffolk County Council for Bridge
- In office 4 May 2017 – 6 May 2021
- Preceded by: Bryony Rudkin
- Succeeded by: Rob Bridgeman

Personal details
- Born: Jack Simon Abbott; 18 October 1990 (age 36) Exeter, Devon, England
- Party: Labour Co-op
- Education: University of Sheffield (BA)
- Website: Official website

Jack Simon Abbott (born 18 October 1990) is a British Labour and Co-operative Party politician serving as Member of Parliament (MP) for Ipswich since 2024.

== Early life and career ==
Abbott was born in Exeter and grew up in Suffolk. He was educated at Debenham High School and later attended Framlingham College as a private student. He graduated with a Bachelor of Arts in History from the University of Sheffield in 2012.

Before entering Parliament, Abbott held several roles in communications and the renewable energy sector. He also served as a teaching assistant at an Ipswich school and worked as an assistant to a Member of Parliament. Prior to his election, he worked as a Westminster lobbyist.

== Political career ==
Abbott first contested the Central Suffolk and North Ipswich seat at the 2015 general election, finishing second to the Conservative incumbent, Dan Poulter. During this period, he was active in internal party politics, organizing for Liz Kendall during the 2015 Labour leadership election and for Owen Smith in 2016.

In 2017, he was elected to Suffolk County Council representing the Bridge ward in Ipswich. On the council, he served as the Labour spokesperson for Children's Services, Education, and Skills, focusing heavily on special educational needs (SEND) provision and mental health care. He did not seek re-election to the council in 2021.

In 2022, Abbott was selected as the Labour candidate for Ipswich, defeating future colleague Alex Mayer in the selection contest. At the 2024 general election, he was elected MP for Ipswich with a majority of 7,403, defeating the incumbent Conservative Tom Hunt.

Since entering the House of Commons, Abbott has been an active member of several committees:

- Backbench Business Committee: Served from 28 October 2024 to 3 March 2025.
- Terminally Ill Adults (End of Life) Bill Committee: Served from 15 January 2025 to 25 March 2025.

Abbott's stance on Kim Leadbeater’s Terminally Ill Adults (End of Life) Bill evolved during the legislative process. Initially expressing concerns regarding safeguards, he was appointed to the committee examining the bill in early 2025. During the committee stage, he moved Amendment 533, which sought to clarify protections under the Equality Act 2010 for healthcare providers and employers. Despite his initial skepticism, Abbott ultimately voted in favor of the bill during its later stages in 2025.

In Parliament, Abbott has frequently spoken on regional devolution, special educational needs, and the "net zero" transition. He has advocated for the English Devolution and Community Empowerment Bill and has been a vocal supporter of the co-operative sector, participating in several debates on government support for co-operative businesses.

Parliament of the United Kingdom
Preceded by Tom Hunt	Member of Parliament for Ipswich; 2024–present	Incumbent
