= Natascha Engel =

British Labour politician (born 1967)

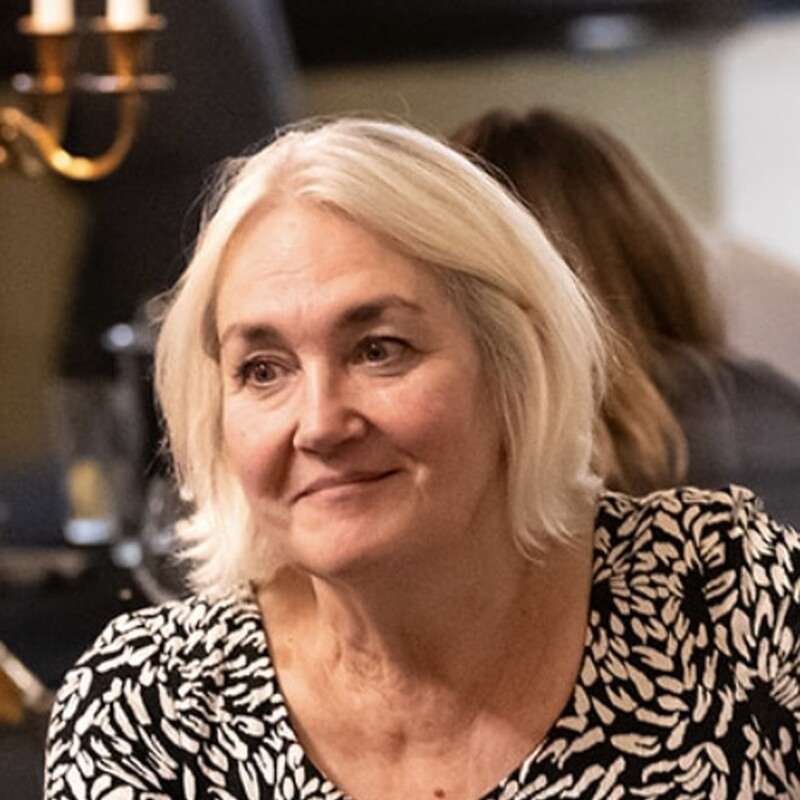
- Engel in 2025

Deputy Speaker of the House of Commons Second Deputy Chair of Ways and Means
- In office 3 June 2015 – 8 June 2017
- Speaker: John Bercow
- Preceded by: Dawn Primarolo
- Succeeded by: Rosie Winterton

Chair of the Backbench Business Committee
- In office 15 June 2010 – 3 June 2015
- Preceded by: Office established
- Succeeded by: Ian Mearns

Member of Parliament for North East Derbyshire
- In office 5 May 2005 – 3 May 2017
- Preceded by: Harry Barnes
- Succeeded by: Lee Rowley

Personal details
- Born: 9 April 1967 (age 59) Berlin, Germany
- Party: Labour
- Spouse: David Salisbury-Jones (div. 2012)
- Children: 3 sons
- Education: King's College London, University of Westminster
- Profession: Translator; trade union organiser

Natascha Engel (born 9 April 1967) is a British former politician. She served as Labour Party Member of Parliament (MP) for North East Derbyshire from 2005 until her defeat at the 2017 general election.

During her final two years in Parliament, Engel was Deputy Speaker (Second Deputy Chair of Ways and Means). She established and was the inaugural chair of the Backbench Business Committee (2010–2015) for which she was awarded Parliamentarian of the Year in 2013 by the Political Studies Association and the Spectator's Backbencher of the Year in 2015.

Engel is now CEO of cross-party policy and research institute, Palace Yard.

== Early life and education ==
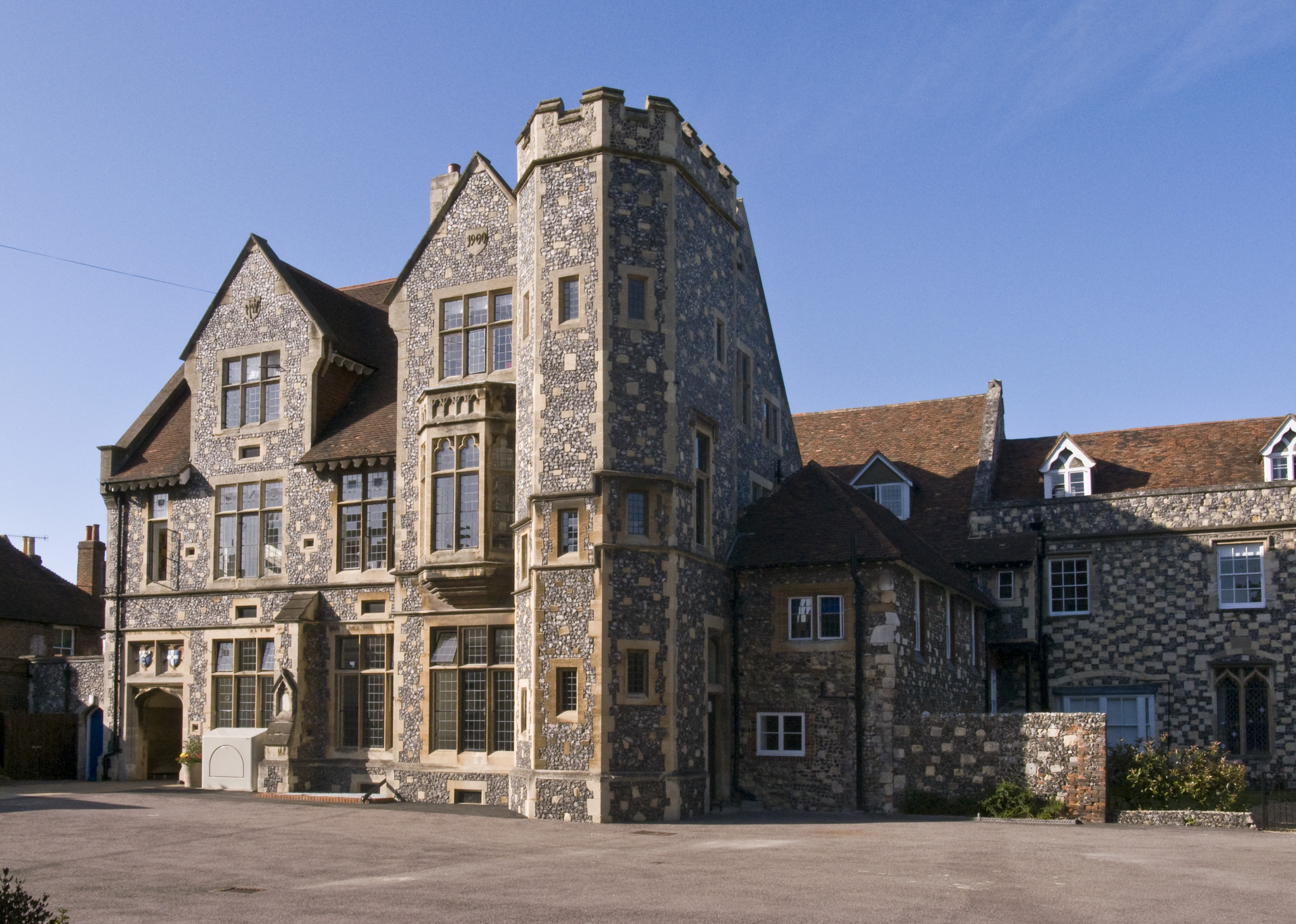
The King's School, Canterbury

Engel was born in West Berlin, Germany, to a German father and an English mother. After her parents' divorce she moved with her mother to Kent and was educated at Kent College and The King's School, Canterbury.

She later trained as a linguist in German and Portuguese at King's College London and at the University of Westminster where she obtained a Master's degree in Technical and Specialised Translation (German, Dutch, Spanish and Portuguese).

== Early career ==
While living in Madrid, Spain, Engel worked as a volunteer for two years in the local office of Amnesty International while earning a living as an English and German teacher. After returning to Britain to work as a Teletext subtitler, Engel learned British Sign Language and volunteered as a communication support worker. She was among the first to join the Organising Academy of the Trades Union Congress, serving with the Graphical, Paper and Media Union. In 2001 she co-ordinated the political fund ballots to help trade unions to maintain their political funds.

Engel joined the Labour Party staff as a Trade Union Liaison Officer in 1997 organising marginal seats campaigning and co-ordinating trade union policy with the Labour Party. In 2001 she became programme director at the think tank, the Smith Institute.

== Parliamentary career ==
=== House of Commons ===
After her election in 2005, Engel was appointed to the Work and Pensions Select Committee.

She served as Parliamentary Private Secretary to Peter Hain when he was Secretary of State for Work and Pensions. She performed the same role for Liam Byrne in 2008 when he was at the Cabinet Office, and then for John Denham when he was Secretary of State for Communities and Local Government in 2009.

In July 2009, she was elected to the Select Committee on Reform of the House of Commons, chaired by Tony Wright MP.

On 15 June 2010, the House of Commons voted to create a Backbench Business Committee, and one week later, Engel defeated Alan Haselhurst 202 to 173 in a secret ballot of MPs to become its first chair. On 6 July 2011, she was named "Backbencher of the Year" for her work with the committee.

Engel's role was to allocate roughly one day a week parliamentary debating time between competing backbenchers by a process described by Quentin Letts as akin to Dragons' Den. She expressed pride in the committee, which is "a powerful check on the executive". Debates are allowed on any topic and, unless they are against party policy, the whips do not interfere. The most contentious debate was on the EU referendum held on 24 October 2011. Engel was re-elected, unopposed, to the chair of the committee May 2012.

After the 2015 General Election, Engel was elected unopposed to be Deputy Speaker (Second Chairman of Ways and Means) under John Bercow's speakership. Alongside her fellow Deputies, Rt Hon Lindsay Hoyle and Eleanor Laing, Engel never said how she voted in the 2016 EU referendum knowing that she would later have to chair debates on the subject.

=== Youth campaigns ===
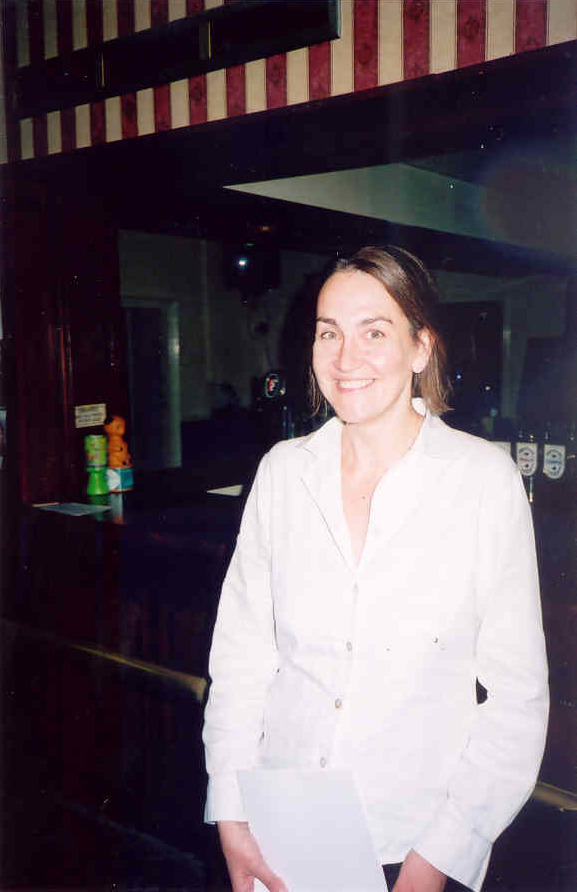
Engel in 2008

Engel was on the Board of Trustees of the UK Youth Parliament and has worked to encourage young people to participate in democracy. Engel became chair of the All Party Parliamentary Group on Youth Affairs in 2008. At the ePolitix Charity Champion awards in November 2007, Engel was named "Children and Youth Champion" for her work. At the 2007–08 annual general meeting of the British Youth Council, she was chosen as an Honorary President of the council.

=== Expenses ===
The Legg Report showed that 343 MPs had been asked to repay money, including several from Derbyshire. Engel repaid £1,934 of which she said £1,339 was a mortgage claim the Fees office paid twice which she repaid immediately whilst £595 was a refund of a house rental deposit.

=== Later elections ===
In the 2015 general election, Engel's majority of 1,883 was the 17th-smallest of Labour's 232 seats by percentage. She had been expected to lose but she retained her seat.

At the 2017 general election, Engel lost to Conservative Lee Rowley by 2,861 despite increasing her share of the vote and total number of votes.

== After Parliament ==
On 5 October 2018, the Conservative government announced Engel as the new Commissioner for Shale Gas. According to the Department for Business, Energy and Industrial Strategy the role was to be "a direct communication link between local communities, the shale gas industry and the industry regulators."

From 2019 to 2022, Engel was partner at policy and opinion research agency, Public First, where she established the energy and infrastructure practice.

From September 2022, Engel co-founded Palace Yard with former Public First associate, Tom Waterhouse, where she is now CEO. Palace Yard is a cross-party policy and research institute which specialises in making complex policy accessible to policy-makers.

== Personal life ==
In 2012, she and her veterinary surgeon husband divorced; they have three sons.

Parliament of the United Kingdom
Preceded by Harry Barnes	Member of Parliament for North East Derbyshire; 2005–2017	Succeeded by Lee Rowley
