= Phil Brickell =

British politician

Phil Brickell MP
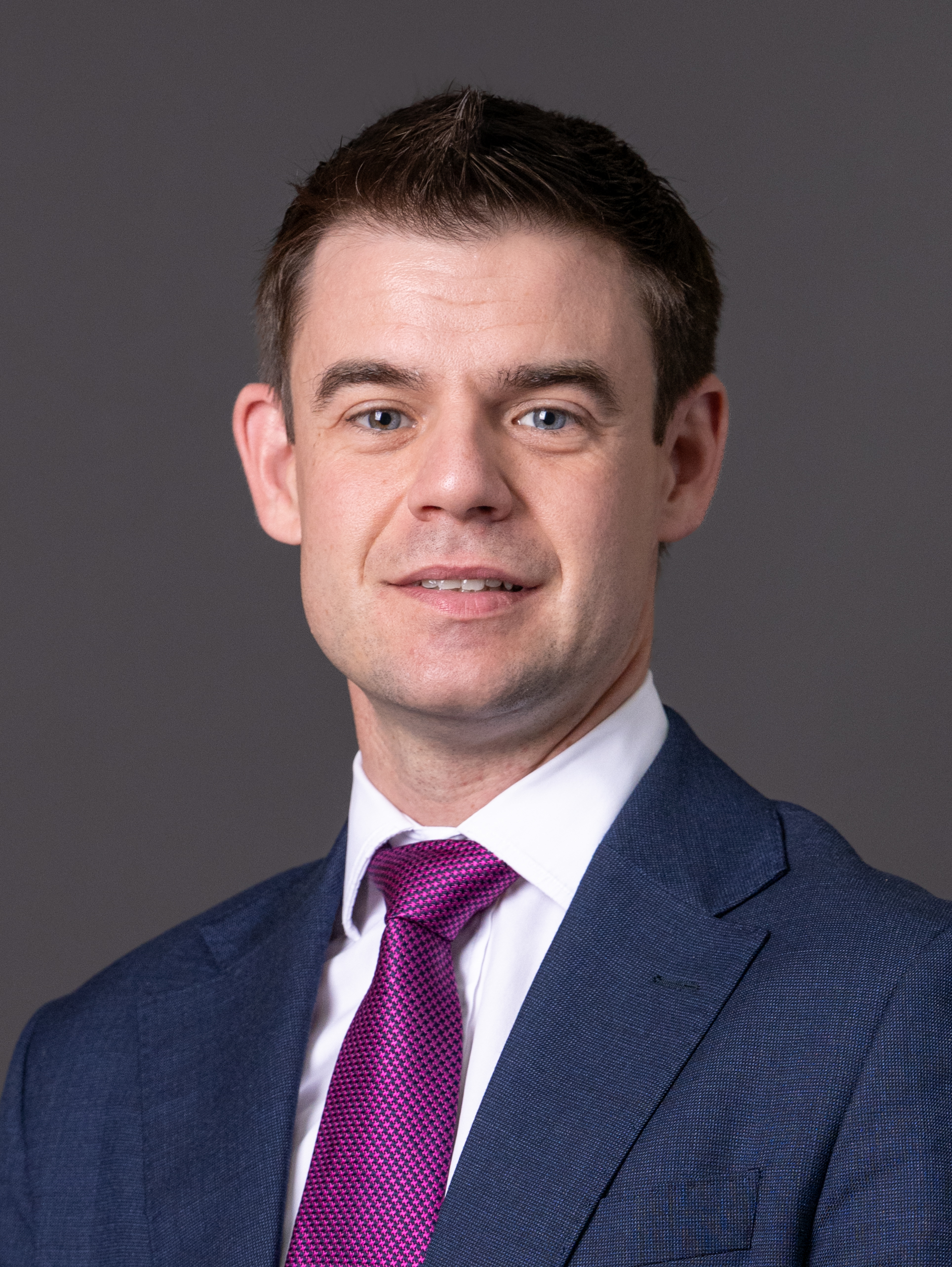
- Official portrait, 2026

Member of Parliament for Bolton West
- Incumbent
- Assumed office 4 July 2024
- Preceded by: Chris Green
- Majority: 4,945 (11.1%)

Member of Manchester City Council for Baguley
- In office 4 May 2023 – 29 July 2024
- Preceded by: Luke Raikes
- Succeeded by: Munaver Rasul

Personal details
- Born: Philip Michael Brickell; 1986 or 1987 (age 39–40) Bolton, Greater Manchester, England
- Party: Labour
- Spouse: Emma Taylor (m. 2022)
- Education: Durham University

Philip Michael Brickell (born 1986 or 1987) is a British Labour Party politician who has been Member of Parliament (MP) for Bolton West since 2024.

== Early life and career ==
Philip Michael Brickell was born in 1986 or 1987 in Bolton, Greater Manchester. He was educated at Bolton School, an independent school in Bolton, having received a "subsidised place". He studied Law at Durham University. While at university, he spent a year abroad at the University of Hanover.

Following university, Brickell was employed in the medical records department at the Royal Bolton Hospital. From 2009 onwards he worked in the financial services industry tackling financial crime, most recently with NatWest Group.

In the May 2023 local election, Brickell was elected to Manchester City Council as a Labour and Co-operative councillor representing Baguley Ward. He had resigned as a councillor by August 2024.

He has been a Member of the Labour Party's National Constitution Committee.

== Parliamentary career ==
In the 2024 general election, Brickell was elected Member of Parliament for Bolton West with 17,363 votes (38.9%) and a majority of 4,945 over the second-placed Conservative candidate. He sat on the House of Commons Foreign Affairs Committee until April 2026, and is a member of the All-Party Parliamentary Group (APPG) on Germany.

In November 2024, Brickell voted in favour of the Terminally Ill Adults (End of Life) Bill, which proposes to legalise assisted suicide.

On 23 April 2025, Brickell was one of 15 UK parliamentarians sanctioned by the Russian Federation for what the Russian government described as "confrontational" statements.

In March 2026, Brickell was appointed a Parliamentary Private Secretary in the Ministry of Justice, supporting David Lammy in his role as Secretary of State for Justice and Deputy Prime Minister.

=== Anti-corruption and standards in public life ===
Before entering Parliament, Brickell spent more than a decade in the financial services sector working on bribery, corruption, tax evasion facilitation and money laundering. In 2025 he was elected chair of the APPG on Anti-Corruption and Responsible Tax, a cross-party group established in 2020 that promotes policies on fair taxation, anti-corruption and financial crime, with a secretariat provided by the Foreign Policy Centre.

==== Overseas Territories and Crown Dependencies ====
Brickell has campaigned for the UK's Overseas Territories and Crown Dependencies to introduce publicly accessible registers of beneficial ownership. In May 2025, after several territories missed a deadline to publish plans for improved transparency, Brickell said resources would be better spent "lifting the veil of corporate secrecy in the British Virgin Islands", which he argued had been used to launder illicit funds.

In November 2025, Brickell secured a Westminster Hall debate on financial transparency in the Overseas Territories, ahead of that month's Joint Ministerial Council between the UK government and territory leaders. In January 2026 he accused jurisdictions including the British Virgin Islands and the Cayman Islands of repeatedly breaking their transparency commitments, saying the delays had damaged Britain's reputation as a fair place to do business.

==== Money laundering on high streets ====
Brickell has raised concerns about the use of cash-intensive high street businesses as fronts for money laundering. In January 2025 he said that "dark money" was blighting Bolton's streets, and later that year described dirty money as the biggest threat facing the high street. In September 2025 he told the House of Commons that members of his APPG had met officers from the National Crime Agency's National Economic Crime Centre to discuss Operation Machinize, the agency's crackdown on money laundering through barbershops, vape shops and other cash-intensive businesses, and described high street money laundering as a matter of huge concern. In May 2026, he argued that Labour needed to demonstrate that Britain was no longer open to dirty money.

==== Ethics and transparency ====
In April 2025, responding to official figures showing that the proportion of Freedom of Information requests granted in full had fallen to a record low, Brickell called on the government to end a "culture of obfuscation" and described access to information as a vital democratic right.

In February 2026, following the Peter Mandelson affair, he wrote in PoliticsHome that ethics reform was "existential" for the Labour Party, calling for the House of Lords Appointments Commission to be placed on a statutory footing and for a statutory register covering all lobbyists.

In 2026, Brickell raised concerns in the House of Commons about Nigel Farage's financial declarations. In July 2026 he asked the Parliamentary Commissioner for Standards to investigate whether Farage had breached rules on paid advocacy by lobbying the Bank of England against a central bank digital currency after receiving a £5 million gift from cryptocurrency investor Christopher Harborne.

==== University of Greater Manchester ====
In March 2025, Brickell wrote to Education Secretary Bridget Phillipson urging an independent investigation into the financial arrangements of the University of Greater Manchester after allegations of misuse of public funds; he said his office had been inundated with corroborating accounts from whistleblowers. Raising the allegations of racism, financial misconduct and bullying in the House of Commons, he was told by the then Leader of the House, Lucy Powell, that the Office for Students and police were examining the claims. Greater Manchester Police subsequently opened an investigation into suspected fraud and bribery, and the university's vice-chancellor, George Holmes, was suspended. Brickell later criticised the length of time the suspensions of senior staff had remained unresolved. In December 2025, the Office for Students announced a formal investigation into the university's management and governance arrangements, which Brickell welcomed.

In January 2026 he described further allegations concerning the university's senior leadership as being of concern and urged the institution to be transparent with people across Bolton.

== Personal life ==
Brickell married Emma Taylor in 2022, whom he served alongside on Manchester City Council.

In October 2023, he climbed Africa’s highest mountain, Mount Kilimanjaro, to raise money for Bolton Hospice.

In his spare time, Brickell is a kayaker and has campaigned for access to waterways and improving the quality of the water in the UK's rivers.

Parliament of the United Kingdom
Preceded by Chris Green	Member of Parliament for Bolton West; 2024–present	Incumbent
