= Ian Mearns =

British Labour politician (born 1957)

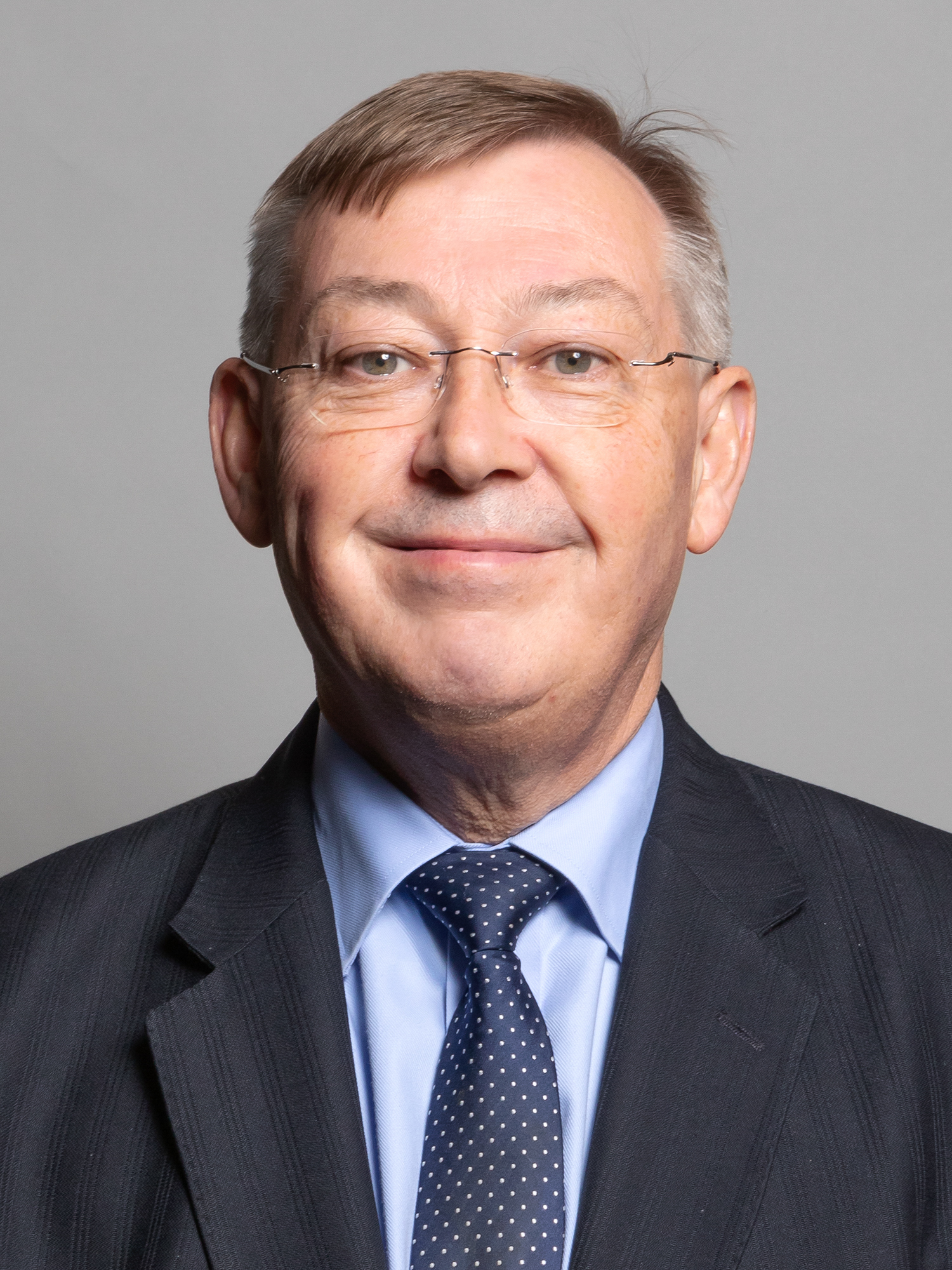
- Official portrait, 2020

Chair of the Backbench Business Committee
- In office 18 June 2015 – 30 May 2024
- Preceded by: Natascha Engel
- Succeeded by: Bob Blackman

Member of Parliament for Gateshead
- In office 6 May 2010 – 30 May 2024
- Preceded by: Constituency established
- Succeeded by: Constituency abolished

Personal details
- Born: 21 April 1957 (age 68) Newcastle upon Tyne, England
- Party: Labour
- Other political affiliations: Socialist Campaign Group
- Website: Official website

James Ian Mearns (born 21 April 1957) is a British Labour Party politician. He served as the Member of Parliament (MP) for Gateshead from 2010 to 2024. He was a member of and latterly Chair of the Socialist Campaign Group parliamentary caucus.

== Early life ==
Born in the General Hospital Newcastle upon Tyne to a Second World War veteran, Mearns was raised a Roman Catholic and was educated at St Mary's RC Primary School (Forest Hall) and having passed the 11 plus exam, at St Mary's RC Technical school (Newcastle). He grew up supporting Newcastle United F.C., and has been a fan of the club for over 50 years. He also helped run and Chaired the Gateshead FC Supporters club in the 1990s.

== Political origins ==
In the 1980s Mearns was a member and Northern Regional Chair of the Labour Party Young Socialists, and a supporter of the Militant Tendency. He ceased being a supporter of the group before becoming a Gateshead Councillor in 1983, serving as a Councillor for the Saltwell ward until 2010. During this period he chaired Gateshead Council's Education Committee and in the Council Cabinet before becoming Deputy Leader of the Council in 2002 carrying on in that role until 2010. He was variously a representative of Gateshead Council on the AMA (Association of Metropolitan Authorities and the LGA (Local Government Association) He was an active supporter of and subsequently Chair of the Campaign for a North East Assembly.

== Parliamentary career ==
Mearns was elected to Parliament in 2010 with a majority of 12,549, in a Gateshead seat created by boundary changes. Along with fellow North Eastern MPs elected in 2010, Ian Lavery and Grahame Morris, Mearns is perceived to be on the left wing of the Labour party. He was one of 16 signatories of an open letter to Ed Miliband in January 2015 calling on the party to commit to oppose further austerity, take rail franchises back into public ownership and strengthen collective bargaining arrangements.

Mearns served on the Education Select Committee continuously from 2010 until his retirement and was the lead Labour member on that committee for several years. He also joined the Backbench Business Committee in the 2010–2015 Parliament and chaired the Committee from June 2015 until the dissolution in May 2024. He was a member of the bill committee for HS2, which he has criticised for treating residents of the north east and other regions not served by the line as "lesser citizens".

In March 2013, Mearns resigned as PPS to Ivan Lewis to defy the Labour whip and vote against the Jobseekers (Back to Work Schemes) Bill which retroactively changed DWP rules relating to Workfare in the United Kingdom.

On 19 June 2015, he was elected as the Chairman of the Backbench Business Select Committee.

On 24 February 2022, following the 2022 Russian invasion of Ukraine, Mearns was one of 11 Labour MPs threatened with losing the party whip after they signed a statement by the Stop the War Coalition which questioned the legitimacy of NATO and accused the military alliance of "eastward expansion". All 11 MPs subsequently removed their signatures. He was also named on a list of Parliamentarians sanctioned by the Russian government, which he regarded as a badge of honour.

He was elected to chair the RMT Parliamentary Group from 2015 to 2024 and also the BFAWU Parliamentary Group from 2015 to 2024. He was also co Chair of the Socialist Campaign Group of Labour MPs until 2024. He helped establish and Chaired the All Party Parliamentary Groups (APPGs) For Housing in the North and another for Football Fans. He also Chaired APPGs for Rail in the North, for Foster Care workers and for Parental Involvement in children’s education. Mearns was honoured to receive the RMT’s Gold medal for services to the union at their conference in Hull in June 2024. In December 2023, Mearns informed his constituency party that he would step down at the 2024 general election, after 41 years of service as an elected representative.

Parliament of the United Kingdom
New constituency	Member of Parliament for Gateshead; 2010–2024	Constituency abolished
