= Backbench Business Committee =

UK parliamentary committee

The Backbench Business Committee of the British House of Commons was created on 15 June 2010 through the adoption of a new standing order. It was created soon after 2010 general election, but had been proposed during the previous Parliament by the Wright Committee on Reform of the House of Commons in its report of 12 November 2009.

== Remit ==
The committee is responsible for determining, on behalf of backbench members (i.e., members who are not Ministers of the Crown or shadow ministers), the business before the House for approximately one day each week. This includes Thursday sittings in the parallel debating chamber, known as Westminster Hall, which are considered half days. The amendments to Standing Order 14 give the committee 35 days per session, of which at least 27 are taken on the floor of the House (as opposed to Westminster Hall). The one-and-one-half-hour Topical Debates, which count as quarter days, are also determined by the committee.

== Chairs ==
Committee chairs include those listed below.

Name	Start	End	Party	Constituency
Natascha Engel	22 June 2010	30 March 2015	Labour	North East Derbyshire
Ian Mearns	18 June 2015	30 May 2024	Labour	Gateshead
Bob Blackman	9 September 2024	present	Conservative	Harrow East

== Membership ==
As set out by Standing Order 152, the committee consists of a chair and seven other members to be elected at the beginning of each session. The chair, who must be an opposition member, is elected under the alternative vote method in a manner similar to other select committee chairs. The other members are selected under the single transferable vote method with the stipulation that the eight members (including the chair) reflect a distribution of the seats made by the Speaker, which is to reflect the party composition of the House of Commons. In addition, at least two men and two women must be elected. Ministers of the Crown, Parliamentary Private Secretaries, and 'principal opposition frontbench spokespersons' are prohibited from standing for election as chair or as a member.

Member	Party	Constituency
Bob Blackman MP (chair)	Conservative	Harrow East
Jonathan Davies MP	Labour	Mid Derbyshire
Lee Dillon MP	Liberal Democrats	Newbury
Mary Glindon MP	Labour	Newcastle upon Tyne East and Wallsend
Alison Hume MP	Labour	Scarborough and Whitby
Will Stone MP	Labour	Swindon North
Martin Vickers MP	Conservative	Brigg and Immingham
Chris Vince MP	Labour	Harlow

=== Changes since 2024 ===
Date	Outgoing Member & Party	Constituency	→	New Member & Party	Constituency	Source
9 December 2024	Wendy Morton MP (Conservative)	Aldridge-Brownhills	→	Martin Vickers MP (Conservative)	Brigg and Immingham	Hansard
3 March 2025	Jack Abbott MP (Labour)	Ipswich	→	Jonathan Davies MP (Labour)	Mid Derbyshire	Hansard
13 November 2025	Jess Brown-Fuller MP (Liberal Democrats)	Chichester	→	Lee Dillon MP (Liberal Democrats)	Newbury	Hansard

== 2020–2024 Parliament ==
Member	Party	Constituency
Ian Mearns MP (chair)	Labour	Gateshead
Bob Blackman MP	Conservative	Harrow East
Kevin Foster MP	Conservative	Torbay
Patricia Gibson MP	SNP	North Ayrshire and Arran
Chris Green MP	Conservative	Bolton West
Nigel Mills MP	Conservative	Amber Valley
Wendy Morton MP	Conservative	Aldridge-Brownhills
Kate Osborne MP	Labour	Jarrow

=== Changes from 2021–2024 ===
Date	Outgoing Member & Party	Constituency	→	New Member & Party	Constituency	Source
2 November 2021	Gareth Bacon MP (Conservative)	Orpington	→	Duncan Baker MP (Conservative)	North Norfolk	Hansard
15 March 2022	Duncan Baker MP (Conservative)	North Norfolk	→	Chris Green MP (Conservative)	Bolton West	Hansard
15 March 2022	David Johnston MP (Conservative)	Wantage	→	Jerome Mayhew MP (Conservative)	Broadland	Hansard
3 May 2022	Imran Ahmad Khan MP (Independent)	Wakefield	→	Vacant		Resignation of member from Parliament
21 November 2022	Jerome Mayhew MP (Conservative)	Broadland	→	Wendy Morton MP (Conservative)	Aldridge-Brownhills	Hansard

== 2020 election ==
The chair was elected on 27 January 2020, with members being announced on 2 March 2020.

Member	Party	Constituency
Ian Mearns MP (chair)	Labour	Gateshead
Nickie Aiken MP	Conservative	Cities of London and Westminster
Bob Blackman MP	Conservative	Harrow East
Fiona Bruce MP	Conservative	Congleton
Patricia Gibson MP	SNP	North Ayrshire and Arran
Nigel Mills MP	Conservative	Amber Valley
Lia Nici MP	Conservative	Great Grimsby
Claudia Webbe MP	Labour	Leicester East

=== Changes 2020-2021 ===
Date	Outgoing Member & Party	Constituency	→	New Member & Party	Constituency	Source
20 July 2020	Nickie Aiken MP (Conservative)	Cities of London and Westminster	→	Gareth Bacon MP (Conservative)	Orpington	Hansard
18 January 2021	Fiona Bruce MP (Conservative)	Congleton	→	Imran Ahmad Khan MP (Conservative)	Wakefield	Hansard
1 March 2021	Lia Nici MP (Conservative)	Great Grimsby	→	David Johnston MP (Conservative)	Wantage	Hansard

== 2017 election ==
The chair was elected on 12 July 2017, with members being announced on 11 September 2017.

Member	Party	Constituency
Ian Mearns MP (chair)	Labour	Gateshead
Bob Blackman MP	Conservative	Harrow East
Rehman Chishti MP	Conservative	Gillingham and Rainham
Patricia Gibson MP	SNP	North Ayrshire and Arran
Jess Phillips MP	Labour	Birmingham Yardley
Alex Sobel MP	Labour	Leeds North West
William Wragg MP	Conservative	Hazel Grove

=== Changes 2017-2019 ===
Date	Outgoing Member & Party	Constituency	→	New Member & Party	Constituency	Source
16 October 2017	New seat		→	Robert Courts MP (Conservative)	Witney	Hansard
23 October 2017	Rehman Chishti MP (Conservative)	Gillingham and Rainham	→	Chris Davies MP (Conservative)	Brecon and Radnorshire	Hansard
19 March 2018	Robert Courts MP (Conservative)	Witney	→	Nigel Mills MP (Conservative)	Amber Valley	Hansard
23 April 2018	Chris Davies MP (Conservative)	Brecon and Radnorshire	→	Colin Clark MP (Conservative)	Gordon	Hansard

== 2016 election ==
The chair was elected on 24 May 2016, with members being announced on 13 June 2016.

Member	Party	Constituency
Ian Mearns MP (chair)	Labour	Gateshead
Bob Blackman MP	Conservative	Harrow East
Kevin Foster MP	Conservative	Torbay
Wendy Morton MP	Conservative	Aldridge-Brownhills
Gavin Newlands MP	SNP	Paisley and Renfrewshire North
David Nuttall MP	Conservative	Bury North
Jess Phillips MP	Labour	Birmingham Yardley
William Wragg MP	Conservative	Hazel Grove

=== Changes 2016-2017 ===
Date	Outgoing Member & Party	Constituency	→	New Member & Party	Constituency	Source
31 October 2016	Wendy Morton MP (Conservative)	Aldridge-Brownhills	→	Dr Dan Poulter MP (Conservative)	Central Suffolk and North Ipswich	Hansard
30 January 2017	Dr Dan Poulter MP (Conservative)	Central Suffolk and North Ipswich	→	Robert Courts MP (Conservative)	Witney	Hansard

== 2015 election ==
The chair was elected on 18 June 2015, with members being announced on 20 July 2015.

Member	Party	Constituency
Ian Mearns MP (chair)	Labour	Gateshead
Bob Blackman MP	Conservative	Harrow East
Peter Bone MP	Conservative	Wellingborough
Philip Hollobone MP	Conservative	Kettering
Gavin Newlands MP	SNP	Paisley and Renfrewshire North
David Nuttall MP	Conservative	Bury North
Jess Phillips MP	Labour	Birmingham Yardley

=== Changes 2015-2016 ===
Date	Outgoing Member & Party	Constituency	→	New Member & Party	Constituency	Source
14 December 2015	New seat		→	Kevin Foster MP (Conservative)	Torbay	Hansard

== 2014 election ==
The chair was elected on 11 June 2014, with members being elected on 30 June 2014.

Member	Party	Constituency
Natascha Engel MP (chair)	Labour	North East Derbyshire
David Amess MP	Conservative	Southend West
David Anderson MP	Labour	Blaydon
Bob Blackman MP	Conservative	Harrow East
Oliver Colvile MP	Conservative	Plymouth Sutton and Devonport
John Hemming MP	Liberal Democrats	Birmingham Yardley
Ian Mearns MP	Labour	Gateshead

== 2013 election ==
The chair was elected on 15 May 2013, with members being elected on 10 June 2013.

Member	Party	Constituency
Natascha Engel MP (chair)	Labour	North East Derbyshire
David Amess MP	Conservative	Southend West
David Anderson MP	Labour	Blaydon
Bob Blackman MP	Conservative	Harrow East
Jane Ellison MP	Conservative	Battersea
John Hemming MP	Liberal Democrats	Birmingham Yardley
Marcus Jones MP	Conservative	Nuneaton
Ian Mearns MP	Labour	Gateshead

=== Changes 2013-2014 ===
Date	Outgoing Member & Party	Constituency	→	New Member & Party	Constituency	Source
4 November 2013	Jane Ellison MP (Conservative)	Battersea	→	Mark Spencer MP (Conservative)	Sherwood	Hansard
4 November 2013	Marcus Jones MP (Conservative)	Nuneaton	→	Oliver Colvile MP (Conservative)	Plymouth Sutton and Devonport	Hansard
4 November 2013	Mark Spencer MP (Conservative)	Sherwood	→	Alec Shelbrooke MP (Conservative)	Elmet and Rothwell	Hansard

== 2012 election ==
The chair was elected on 16 May 2012, with members being elected on 12 June 2012.

Member	Party	Constituency
Natascha Engel MP (chair)	Labour	North East Derbyshire
David Amess MP	Conservative	Southend West
David Anderson MP	Labour	Blaydon
Bob Blackman MP	Conservative	Harrow East
Jane Ellison MP	Conservative	Battersea
John Hemming MP	Liberal Democrats	Birmingham Yardley
Marcus Jones MP	Conservative	Nuneaton
Ian Mearns MP	Labour	Gateshead

== 2010 election ==
The chair was elected on 22 June 2010, with members being elected on 29 June 2010.

Member	Party	Constituency
Natascha Engel MP (chair)	Labour	North East Derbyshire
David Anderson MP	Labour	Blaydon
Peter Bone MP	Conservative	Wellingborough
Philip Davies MP	Conservative	Shipley
Jane Ellison MP	Conservative	Battersea
John Hemming MP	Liberal Democrats	Birmingham Yardley
Philip Hollobone MP	Conservative	Kettering
Alison Seabeck MP	Labour	Plymouth Moor View

=== By-elections 2010-2012 ===
Date of resignation	Outgoing Member & Party	Constituency	Source	Date of by-election	New Member & Party	Constituency	Source
3 November 2010	David Anderson MP (Labour)	Blaydon	Hansard	8 November 2010	Ian Mearns MP (Labour)	Gateshead	Hansard
3 November 2010	Alison Seabeck MP (Labour)	Plymouth Moor View	Hansard	8 November 2010	George Mudie MP (Labour)	Leeds East	Hansard

== Review ==
When it created the committee, the House resolved to review the committee's work at the beginning of the 2011/12 session. The Leader of the House of Commons, Sir George Young, stated that the purpose of the review was to help reach the next phase of implementing the Wright Committee report: setting up a committee to manage substantially all House business.
