= Irene Campbell =

Scottish Labour politician

Irene Campbell MP
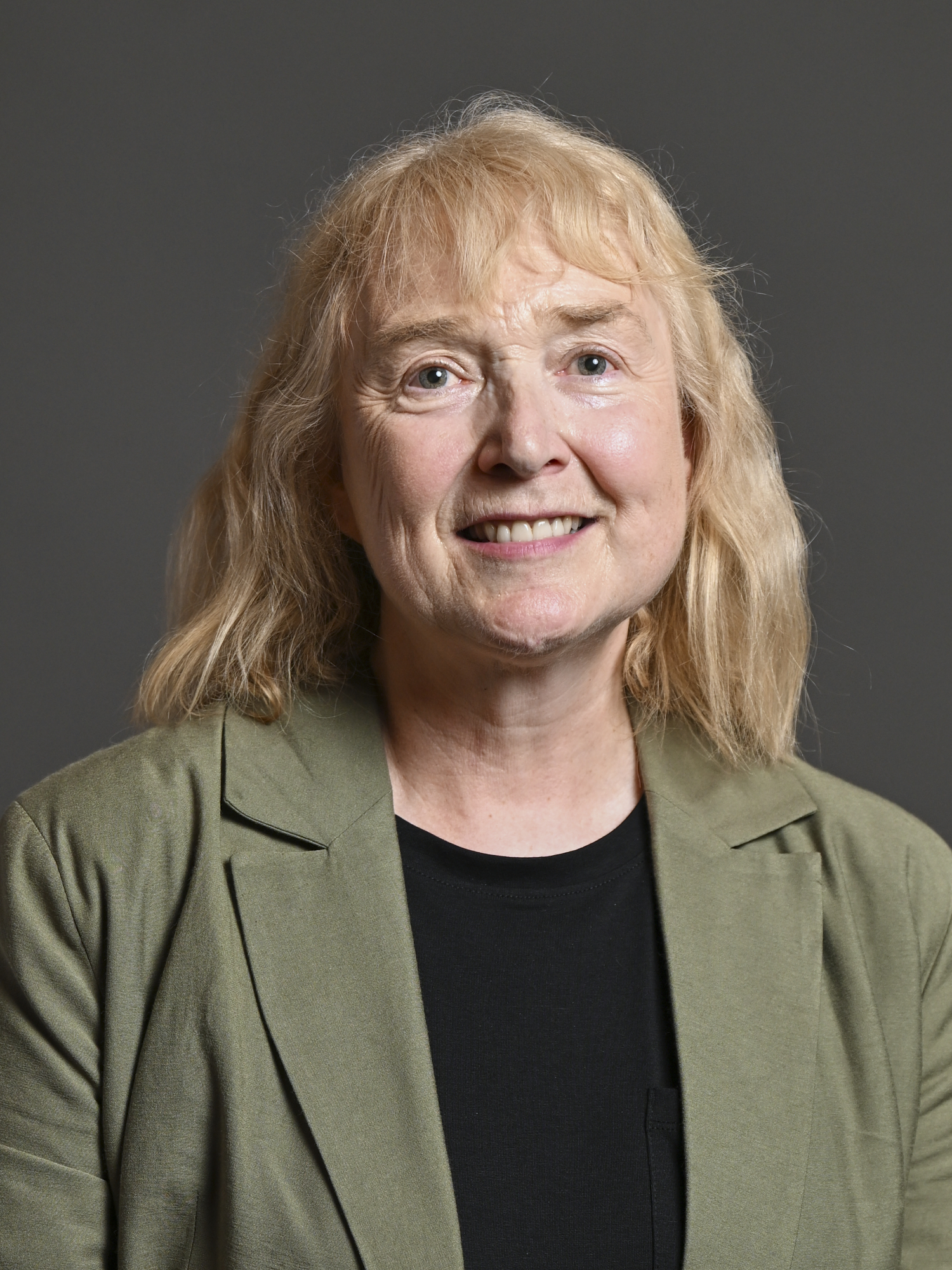
- Official portrait, 2024

Member of Parliament for North Ayrshire and Arran
- Incumbent
- Assumed office 4 July 2024
- Preceded by: Patricia Gibson
- Majority: 3,551 (8.4%)

Personal details
- Born: 1964 (age 61–62) Saltcoats, Scotland
- Party: Labour
- Website: www.facebook.com/IreneCampbellMP

Irene Campbell (born 1964) is a Scottish Labour Party politician who has served as the Member of Parliament for North Ayrshire and Arran since 2024.

== Early life and education ==
Irene Campbell was born in 1964 in Saltcoats, North Ayrshire. She was educated locally at Auchenharvie Academy before attending university gaining a BA (Hons) and later a master's degree.

== SPLASH Group ==
In the town of Saltcoats, she is the chair of SPLASH, a group seeking funding to refurbish the town's outdoor tidal pool.

== Parliamentary career ==
Campbell was elected as the Scottish Labour MP for North Ayrshire and Arran on a 21.5% swing to Labour from the SNP, unseating the nine-year incumbent Patricia Gibson.

On 10 May 2026, she called on Keir Starmer to resign following the 2026 Scottish Parliament election.
