= Northern Research Group =

Group of British Conservative MPs

The Northern Research Group (NRG) is a group founded by a number of Conservative MPs in the United Kingdom who were elected to represent constituencies in northern England, Wales and the Scottish Borders in the 2019 general election to pressure government for greater investment in the north. The group was previously chaired by Conservative Jake Berry, a former Minister of State for the Northern Powerhouse, and is modelled on the European Research Group, a group of MPs dedicated to exiting the European Union. Other members include David Davis, Esther McVey, David Jones and David Mundell, who have also served as ministers in previous Conservative Governments. Gordon Rayner, of The Telegraph, has described the Northern Research Group as "a party within a party" and the "biggest threat to Boris Johnson's authority since he came to power". As of October 2020 the Northern Research Group had 55 members.

In October 2020, the Northern Research Group wrote to Prime Minister Boris Johnson urging his government to provide a roadmap for exiting the lockdown strategy adopted during the COVID-19 pandemic, and more investment to address the UK's North–South divide. In January 2021, the group urged Chancellor Rishi Sunak to extend financial help packages for families and businesses as the uncertainty over COVID continues.

On 17 June 2022, Prime Minister Boris Johnson controversially cancelled a conference with the Northern Research Group in Doncaster to visit Ukraine, with a senior NRG source claiming that Johnson has “shown a total contempt for colleagues, contempt for members and contempt for the north” through his cancellation of the conference.
