= 2022 Conservative Party leadership election =

Conservative Party leadership elections were held in the following countries in 2022:

- 2022 Conservative Party of Canada leadership election
- July–September 2022 Conservative Party leadership election (UK)
- October 2022 Conservative Party leadership election (UK)

== See also ==
- 2022 United Conservative Party leadership election
- Endorsements in the 2022 Conservative Party of Canada leadership election
- Endorsements in the July–September 2022 Conservative Party leadership election
- Endorsements in the October 2022 Conservative Party leadership election
