= Adam Thompson (British politician) =

British politician (born 1990)

Adam Thompson MP
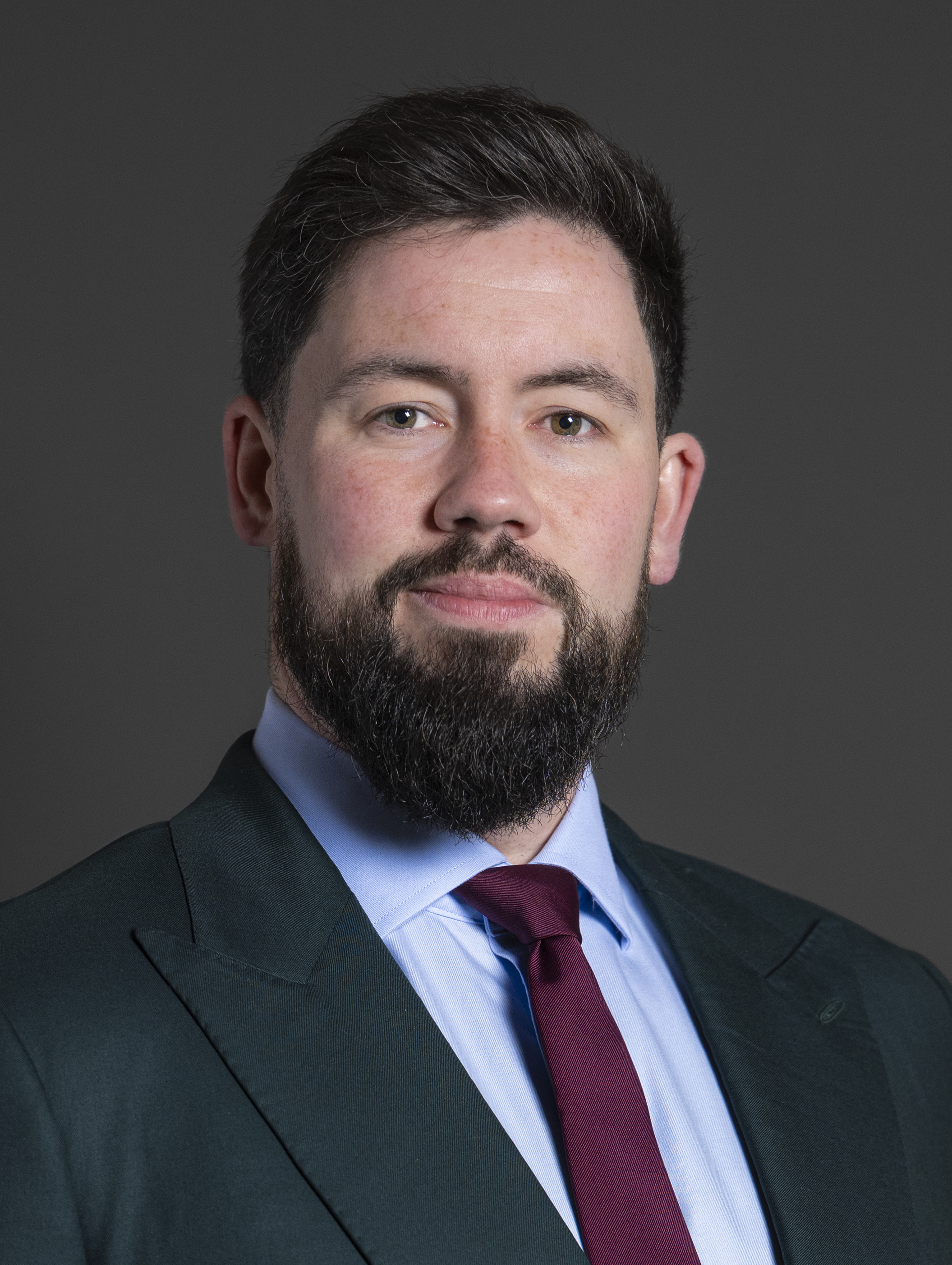
- Official portrait, 2025

Member of Parliament for Erewash
- Incumbent
- Assumed office 4 July 2024
- Preceded by: Maggie Throup
- Majority: 5,859 (13.6%)

Personal details
- Born: 30 November 1990 (age 35)
- Party: Labour
- Education: University of Warwick (BSc, MPhys); University of Southampton (PGCE); University of Nottingham (PhD)
- Website: adamthompsonlabour.uk/about

Adam Thompson (born 30 November 1990) is a British Labour Party politician who has served as Member of Parliament (MP) for Erewash since 2024.

He stood for the neighbouring Amber Valley constituency for the previous general election in 2019.

== Early life and education ==
Thompson grew up in Cardiff and attended Llanishen High School. He graduated with an BSc MPhys in physics from the University of Warwick in 2013, followed by a PGCE at the University of Southampton. He attained a PhD in metrology from the University of Nottingham, following which he worked at the university as a research scientist in manufacturing engineering. He served as a union representative for research scientists at the institution as a member of the University and College Union. Having trained as a teacher, he has cited his experience working in schools during Michael Gove's tenure as Education Secretary as a key influence on his decision to enter electoral politics.

== Early political career ==
Thompson joined the Labour Party following the 2015 general election, inspired by a speech made by then-outgoing party leader Ed Miliband. Prior to his election as a member of parliament, he contested a number of local elections, including to Sandiacre Parish Council, Erewash Borough Council, and Derbyshire County Council. In the 2019 borough council election, he fell eight votes short of winning one of the three council seats in Long Eaton Central ward.

Shortly ahead of the 2019 general election, he was selected as the Labour Party candidate in the Amber Valley constituency, which neighbours Erewash. He finished second, defeated by sitting Conservative MP Nigel Mills; Mills won with a majority of 16,886 votes (37%), the largest margin for any winning party in the seat since its creation in 1983. Mills was subsequently defeated at the 2024 general election by Labour candidate Linsey Farnsworth.

Thompson was serving as a Vice-Chair of Scientists for Labour in 2020 at the outbreak of the global COVID-19 pandemic. In that role, he co-led a team which briefed the Shadow Cabinet during the crisis.

Thompson was selected as Labour's parliamentary candidate for Erewash in July 2022. He was endorsed in this process by the CWU, regional branches of UNISON, the GMB, and Unite, as well as the East Midlands branch of the Co-operative Party. At the time, he was also serving as secretary and campaign coordinator in the Erewash Constituency Labour Party.

He was the Labour Party candidate in Erewash at the 2024 general election, in which he defeated incumbent MP Maggie Throup. Thompson won by 5859 votes (13.6%), becoming the first Labour MP for Erewash since Liz Blackman, who had stood down 14 years earlier.

== Parliamentary career ==
Thompson gave his maiden speech as an MP in October 2024, in which he was reported as "celebrating local residents" who empower the local community. He honoured famous figures associated with Erewash, including actor Robert Lindsay, grime artist Bru-C and the Baron Houghton of Sowerby, spoke about the towns and villages which make up Erewash, and his background as a scientist.

In November 2024, Thompson voted in favour of the Terminally Ill Adults (End of Life) Bill, which proposes to legalise assisted dying. He released a statement saying that he supports a "system of assisted dying which allows people the choice to end their lives in dignity" and that the majority of Erewash constituents who had contacted him strongly supported the bill. Also that month, he criticised plans by Derbyshire County Council to close council-owned care homes and day care centres in Erewash, describing them as "reckless" and a "betrayal".

In April 2025, he gave an extended speech in support of the Product Regulation and Metrology Bill, describing himself as the first metrologist to have been elected to the House of Commons, and elaborating on the subject. Conservative MP John Hayes described Thompson's speech as "a wonderful contribution".

In December 2025, Thompson questioned Digital Economy Minister Baroness Liz Lloyd on competition between broadband providers and how it was measured. Baroness Lloyd's conduct in the meeting was described by British technology news publication The Register as a "farce".

Thompson was appointed as a parliamentary private secretary to the Home Office in March 2026.

As a backbencher, Thompson sat on committees for three All-Party Parliamentary Groups, serving as chair of the APPGs on British universities and the furniture industry, and as co-chair of the Reserves and Cadets APPG alongside Conservative MP David Davis. Thompson was a member of the Science, Innovation and Technology Select Committee from October 2024 to June 2026. Thompson resigned his select committee and all-party parliamentary group roles when he was appointed as a parliamentary private secretary in the Home Office.

On 9 July 2026, he formally endorsed Andy Burnham in the 2026 Labour leadership election.

== Personal life ==
He has resided in Long Eaton since 2019, having previously lived in Sandiacre from 2015.

In May 2025, Thompson described his personal enjoyment of woodworking in an interview with British furniture industry publication Furniture News. Discussing his links to the furniture-making industry in Erewash, he noted that his grandfather and uncle had connections to the trade, and that he would "build [his] own furniture" and was working on making a TV stand.

Thompson records monthly interviews with local radio station Erewash Sound. In the course of these interviews, he has discussed national political issues like immigration and British railway infrastructure, alongside local matters like his campaigns for a banking hub in Long Eaton, the provision of bleed control kits in Ilkeston, improvements to Junction 25 of the M1, and for stronger planning controls of houses of multiple occupation.

Parliament of the United Kingdom
| Preceded by Maggie Throup | Member of Parliament for Erewash; 2024–Present | Incumbent |
