= Endorsements in the July–September 2022 Conservative Party leadership election =

Public endorsements by sitting members of parliament for the candidates standing for leadership in the July–September 2022 Conservative Party leadership election.

This is a list of public endorsements for declared candidates in the election in July–September 2022 of a parliamentary leader for the Conservative Party of the United Kingdom.

== Members of Parliament ==
=== Kemi Badenoch ===
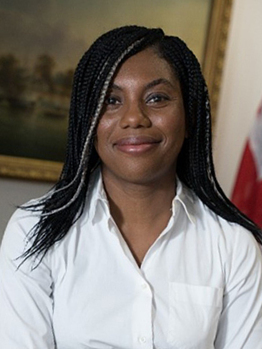
Kemi Badenoch was eliminated after 4th round

1. Adam Afriyie, MP for Windsor
2. Lucy Allan, MP for Telford (subsequently endorsed Truss)
3. Lee Anderson, MP for Ashfield (subsequently endorsed Truss)
4. Gareth Bacon, MP for Orpington (subsequently endorsed Truss)
5. Ben Bradley, MP for Mansfield
6. Alex Burghart, MP for Brentwood and Ongar (subsequently endorsed Truss)
7. Robert Courts, MP for Witney (previously endorsed Shapps)
8. Sarah Dines, MP for Derbyshire Dales (subsequently endorsed Truss)
9. Leo Docherty, MP for Aldershot (subsequently endorsed Truss)
10. Steve Double, MP for St Austell and Newquay (subsequently endorsed Sunak)
11. Nick Fletcher, MP for Don Valley (subsequently endorsed Truss)
12. Michael Gove, MP for Surrey Heath (subsequently endorsed Sunak)
13. John Hayes, MP for South Holland and the Deepings (subsequently endorsed Truss)
14. Eddie Hughes, MP for Walsall North
15. Tom Hunt, MP for Ipswich (subsequently endorsed Truss)
16. Caroline Johnson, MP for Sleaford and North Hykeham (subsequently endorsed Truss)
17. Pauline Latham, MP for Mid Derbyshire (subsequently endorsed Truss)
18. Andrew Lewer, MP for Northampton South (subsequently endorsed Truss)
19. Marco Longhi, MP for Dudley North (subsequently endorsed Truss)
20. Julia Lopez, MP for Hornchurch and Upminster (subsequently endorsed Truss)
21. Craig Mackinlay, MP for South Thanet
22. Rachel Maclean, MP for Redditch (subsequently endorsed Truss)
23. Nigel Mills, MP for Amber Valley (subsequently endorsed Truss)
24. Neil O'Brien, MP for Harborough
25. Tom Randall, MP for Gedling (subsequently endorsed Sunak)
26. Lee Rowley, MP for North East Derbyshire (subsequently endorsed Truss)
27. Desmond Swayne, MP for New Forest West (subsequently endorsed Sunak)
28. Justin Tomlinson, MP for North Swindon
29. Bill Wiggin, MP for North Herefordshire (subsequently endorsed Truss)

=== Suella Braverman ===
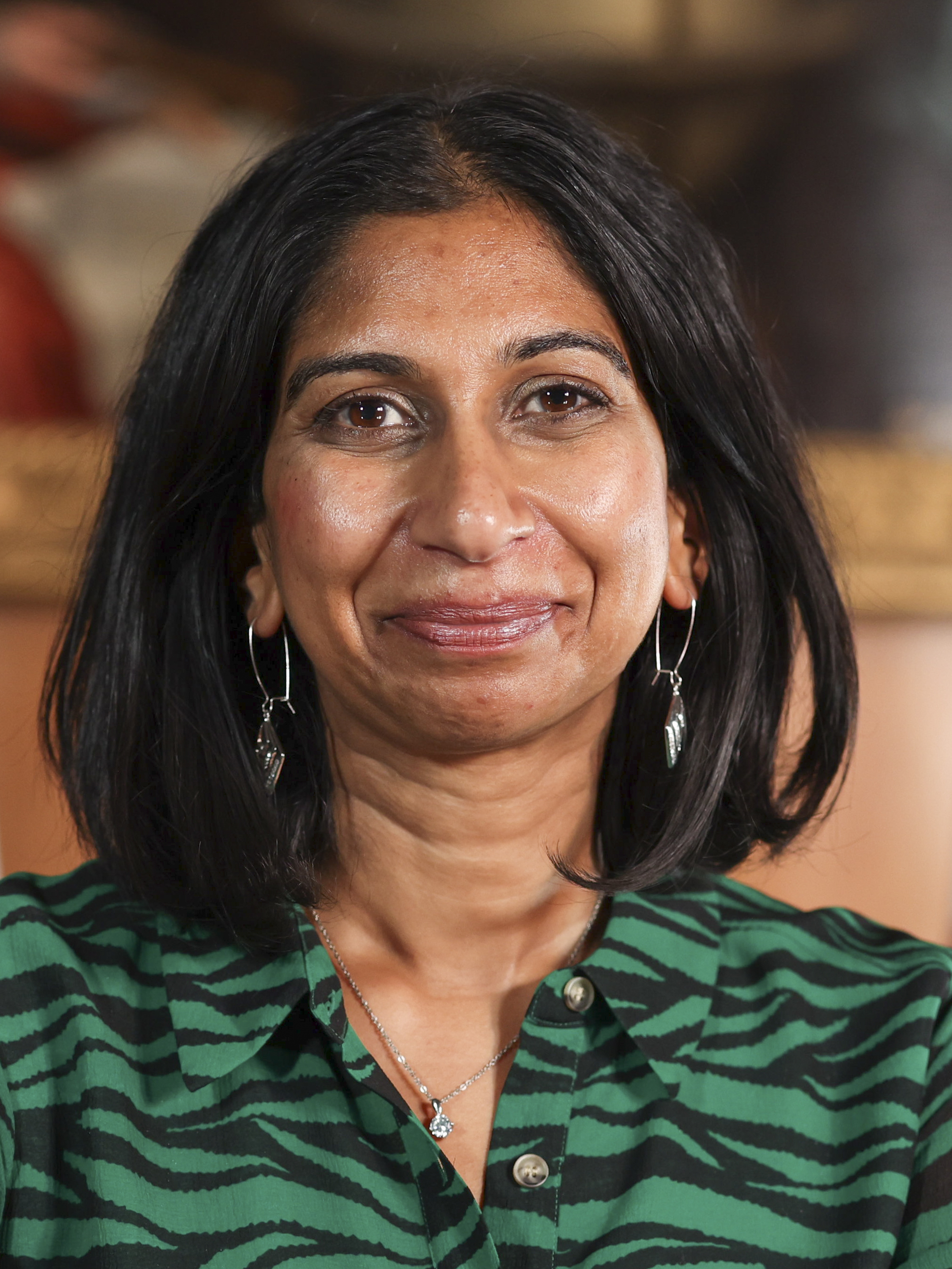
Suella Braverman was eliminated after 2nd round; subsequently endorsed Truss

1. Steve Baker, MP for Wycombe (subsequently endorsed Truss)
2. Scott Benton, MP for Blackpool South (subsequently endorsed Truss)
3. Miriam Cates, MP for Penistone and Stocksbridge
4. Richard Drax, MP for South Dorset (subsequently endorsed Truss)
5. John Hayes, MP for South Holland and the Deepings (subsequently endorsed Badenoch and Truss)
6. Philip Hollobone, MP for Kettering
7. Bernard Jenkin, MP for Harwich and North Essex
8. David Jones, MP for Clwyd West (subsequently endorsed Truss)
9. Danny Kruger, MP for Devizes (subsequently endorsed Truss)
10. Julian Lewis, MP for New Forest East (subsequently endorsed Truss)
11. Jason McCartney, MP for Colne Valley (subsequently endorsed Truss)
12. Robin Millar, MP for Aberconwy (subsequently endorsed Truss)
13. Greg Smith, MP for Buckingham (subsequently endorsed Truss)
14. Henry Smith, MP for Crawley (subsequently endorsed Truss)
15. Desmond Swayne, MP for New Forest West (subsequently endorsed Badenoch, then Sunak)

=== Jeremy Hunt ===
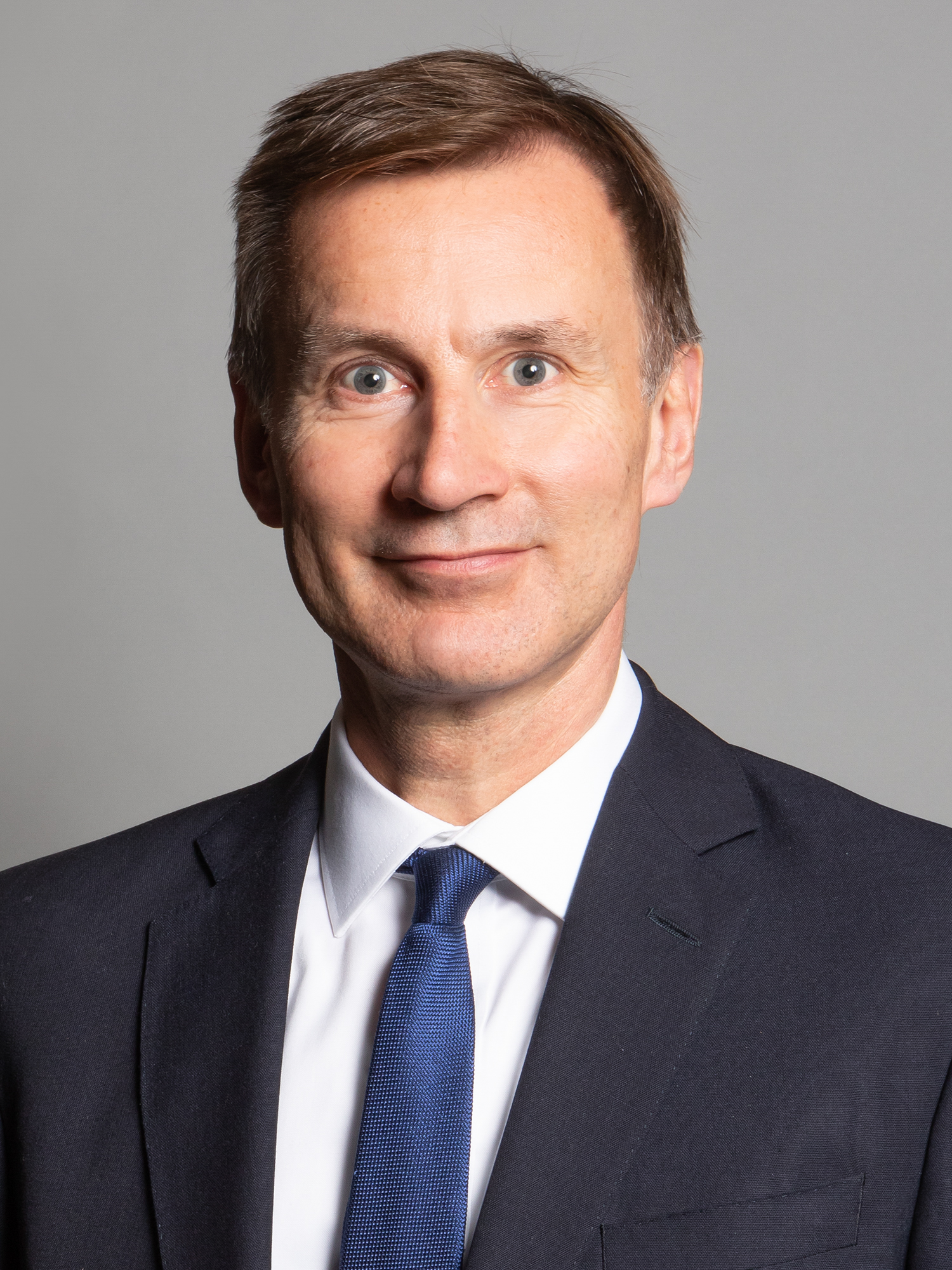
Jeremy Hunt was eliminated after 1st round; subsequently endorsed Sunak

1. Paul Beresford, MP for Mole Valley (subsequently endorsed Sunak)
2. Crispin Blunt, MP for Reigate (subsequently endorsed Sunak)
3. Peter Bottomley, MP for Worthing West
4. Steve Brine, MP for Winchester (subsequently endorsed Sunak)
5. Philip Davies, MP for Shipley (subsequently endorsed Sunak)
6. Jonathan Djanogly, MP for Huntingdon (subsequently endorsed Sunak)
7. Philip Dunne, MP for Ludlow
8. Oliver Heald, MP for North East Hertfordshire (subsequently endorsed Truss)
9. Daniel Kawczynski, MP for Shrewsbury and Atcham (subsequently endorsed Truss)
10. Anthony Mangnall, MP for Totnes (subsequently endorsed Sunak)
11. Esther McVey, MP for Tatton
12. Andrew Mitchell, MP for Sutton Coldfield (subsequently endorsed Sunak)
13. David Morris, MP for Morecambe and Lunesdale
14. Dan Poulter, MP for Central Suffolk and North Ipswich (subsequently endorsed Sunak)

=== Sajid Javid ===
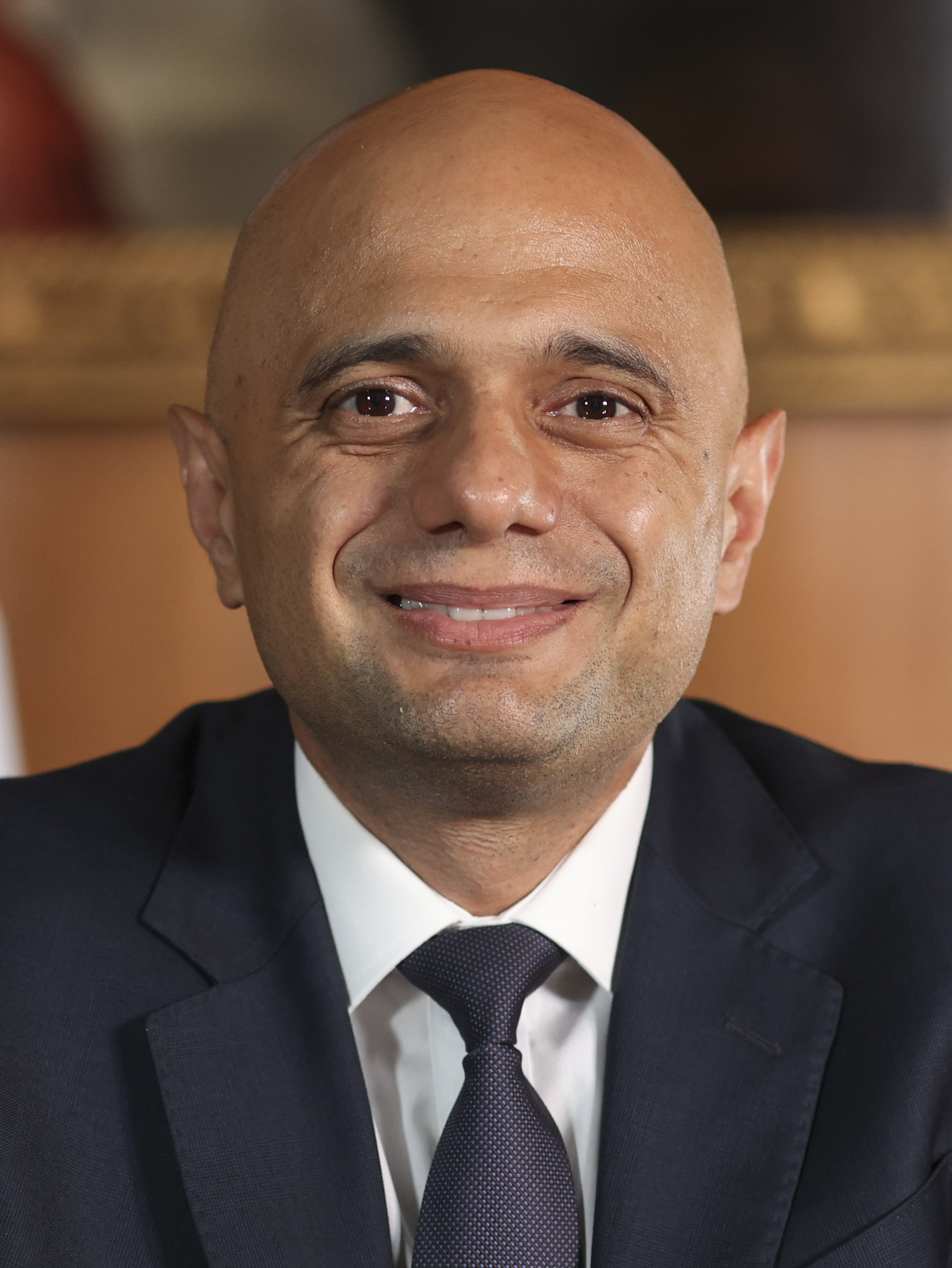
Sajid Javid (withdrew before 1st round, subsequently endorsed Truss)

1. Edward Argar, MP for Charnwood (subsequently endorsed Truss)
2. Saqib Bhatti, MP for Meriden (subsequently endorsed Truss)
3. Steve Double, MP for St Austell and Newquay (subsequently endorsed Badenoch, then Sunak)
4. Virginia Crosbie, MP for Ynys Môn (subsequently endorsed Truss)
5. Robert Halfon, MP for Harlow (subsequently endorsed Sunak)
6. Pauline Latham, MP for Mid Derbyshire (subsequently endorsed Badenoch and Truss)
7. Rachel Maclean, MP for Redditch (subsequently endorsed Badenoch, then Truss)
8. Chris Philp, MP for Croydon South (subsequently endorsed Truss)
9. Mary Robinson, MP for Cheadle (subsequently endorsed Truss)
10. Robin Walker, MP for Worcester (subsequently endorsed Sunak)
11. Mike Wood, MP for Dudley South (subsequently endorsed Sunak)
12. Jeremy Wright, MP for Kenilworth and Southam (subsequently endorsed Mordaunt and Sunak)

=== Penny Mordaunt ===
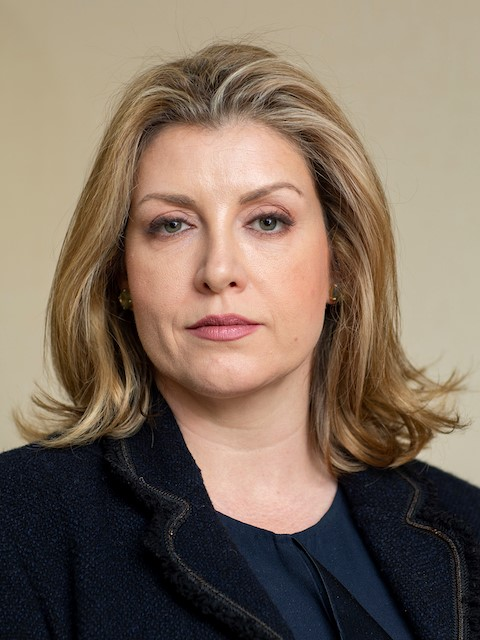
Penny Mordaunt (eliminated after 5th round; subsequently endorsed Truss)

1. Peter Aldous, MP for Waveney (subsequently endorsed Sunak)
2. Caroline Ansell, MP for Eastbourne (subsequently endorsed Sunak)
3. Sarah Atherton, MP for Wrexham (subsequently endorsed Truss)
4. Duncan Baker, MP for North Norfolk (subsequently endorsed Truss)
5. Harriett Baldwin, MP for West Worcestershire
6. John Baron, MP for Basildon and Billericay
7. Jack Brereton, MP for Stoke-on-Trent South (previously endorsed Zahawi)
8. Theo Clarke, MP for Stafford
9. Elliot Colburn, MP for Carshalton and Wallington
10. Damian Collins, MP for Folkestone and Hythe (subsequently endorsed Truss)
11. Alberto Costa, MP for South Leicestershire (subsequently endorsed Truss)
12. James Davies, MP for Vale of Clwyd (subsequently endorsed Truss)
13. Mims Davies, MP for Mid Sussex (subsequently endorsed Truss)
14. David Davis, MP for Haltemprice and Howden (subsequently endorsed Sunak)
15. Caroline Dinenage, MP for Gosport
16. Michelle Donelan, MP for Chippenham (subsequently endorsed Truss)
17. Tobias Ellwood , MP for Bournemouth East (previously endorsed Zahawi; whip suspended on 19 July)
18. Natalie Elphicke, MP for Dover (subsequently endorsed Truss)
19. Luke Evans, MP for Bosworth (subsequently endorsed Sunak)
20. Michael Fabricant, MP for Lichfield (subsequently endorsed Truss)
21. George Freeman, MP for Mid Norfolk (subsequently endorsed Sunak)
22. Roger Gale, MP for North Thanet
23. James Gray, MP for North Wiltshire (subsequently endorsed Sunak)
24. Damian Green, MP for Ashford (subsequently endorsed Sunak)
25. Trudy Harrison, MP for Copeland (subsequently endorsed Truss)
26. Gordon Henderson, MP for Sittingbourne and Sheppey (subsequently endorsed Truss)
27. Antony Higginbotham, MP for Burnley (subsequently endorsed Truss)
28. Alicia Kearns, MP for Rutland and Melton (subsequently endorsed Sunak)
29. Kate Kniveton, MP for Burton
30. John Lamont, MP for Berwickshire, Roxburgh and Selkirk (subsequently endorsed Sunak)
31. Andrea Leadsom, MP for South Northamptonshire (subsequently endorsed Truss)
32. Ian Levy, MP for Blyth Valley (subsequently endorsed Truss)
33. Tim Loughton, MP for East Worthing and Shoreham
34. Jerome Mayhew, MP for Broadland (subsequently endorsed Truss)
35. Stephen Metcalfe, MP for South Basildon and East Thurrock
36. Maria Miller, MP for Basingstoke (subsequently endorsed Truss)
37. Robbie Moore, MP for Keighley
38. Jill Mortimer, MP for Hartlepool
39. Kieran Mullan, MP for Crewe and Nantwich (subsequently endorsed Truss)
40. Caroline Nokes, MP for Romsey and Southampton North (subsequently endorsed Sunak)
41. Mike Penning, MP for Hemel Hempstead (subsequently endorsed Truss)
42. John Penrose, MP for Weston-Super-Mare (subsequently endorsed Truss)
43. Nicola Richards, MP for West Bromwich East (subsequently endorsed Truss)
44. Gary Sambrook, MP for Birmingham Northfield
45. Bob Seely, MP for Isle of Wight (subsequently endorsed Truss)
46. Bob Stewart, MP for Beckenham (subsequently endorsed Sunak)
47. James Sunderland, MP for Bracknell (subsequently endorsed Truss)
48. Derek Thomas, MP for St Ives (subsequently endorsed Truss)
49. Craig Tracey, MP for North Warwickshire (subsequently endorsed Truss)
50. Charles Walker, MP for Broxbourne (subsequently endorsed Sunak)
51. Jamie Wallis, MP for Bridgend (subsequently endorsed Sunak)
52. Heather Wheeler, MP for South Derbyshire (subsequently endorsed Truss)
53. Jeremy Wright, MP for Kenilworth and Southam (subsequently endorsed Sunak)

=== Grant Shapps ===
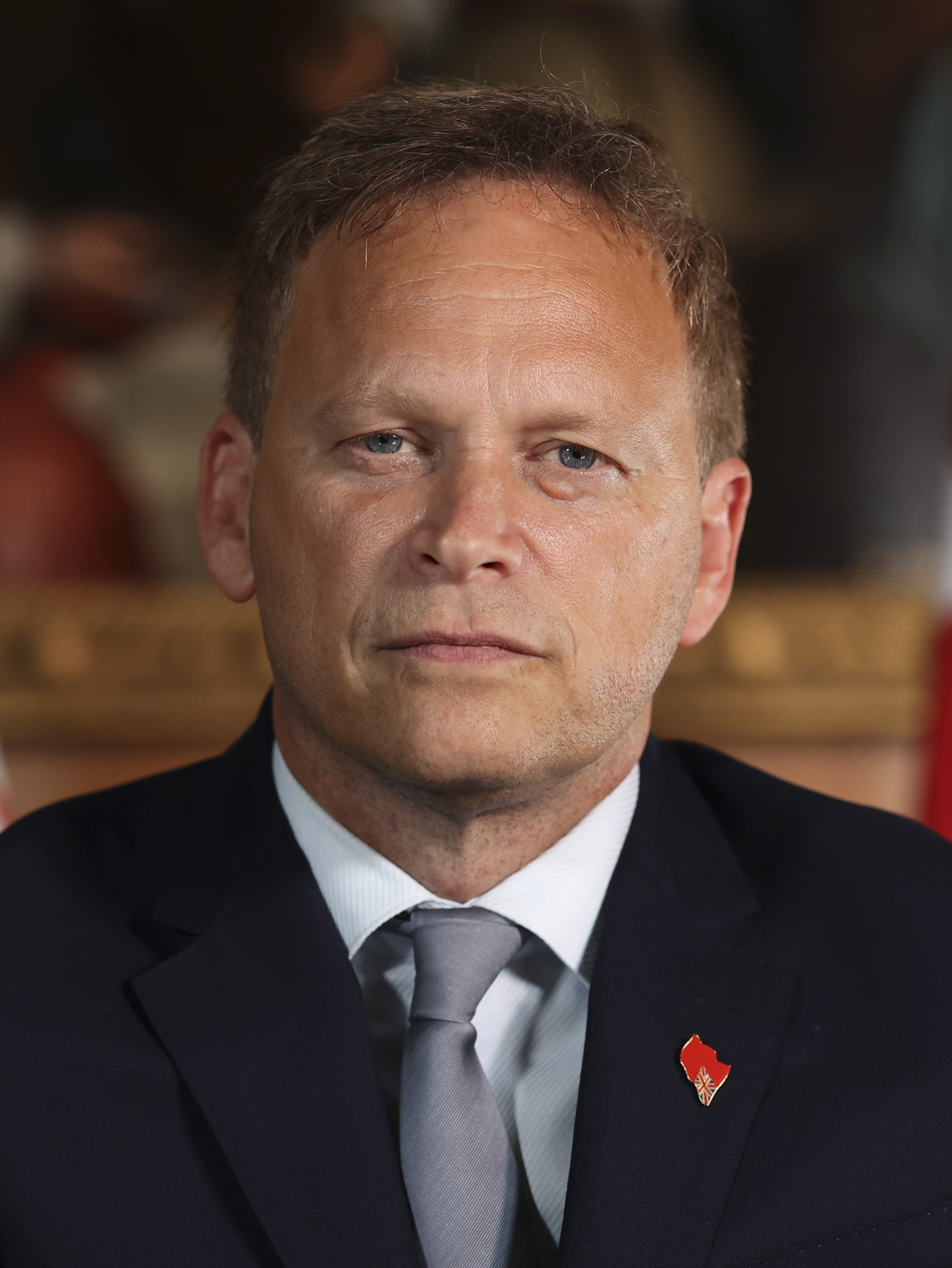
Grant Shapps withdrew before 1st round; subsequently endorsed Sunak

1. Paul Bristow, MP for Peterborough (subsequently endorsed Truss)
2. Robert Courts, MP for Witney (subsequently endorsed Badenoch)
3. James Davies, MP for Vale of Clwyd (subsequently endorsed Mordaunt, then Truss)
4. George Eustice, MP for Camborne and Redruth (subsequently endorsed Sunak)
5. Trudy Harrison, MP for Copeland (subsequently endorsed Mordaunt, then Truss)
6. Sheryll Murray, MP for South East Cornwall (subsequently endorsed Truss)
7. Mark Pritchard, MP for The Wrekin (subsequently endorsed Truss)
8. Graham Stuart, MP for Beverley and Holderness (subsequently endorsed Truss)

=== Rishi Sunak ===
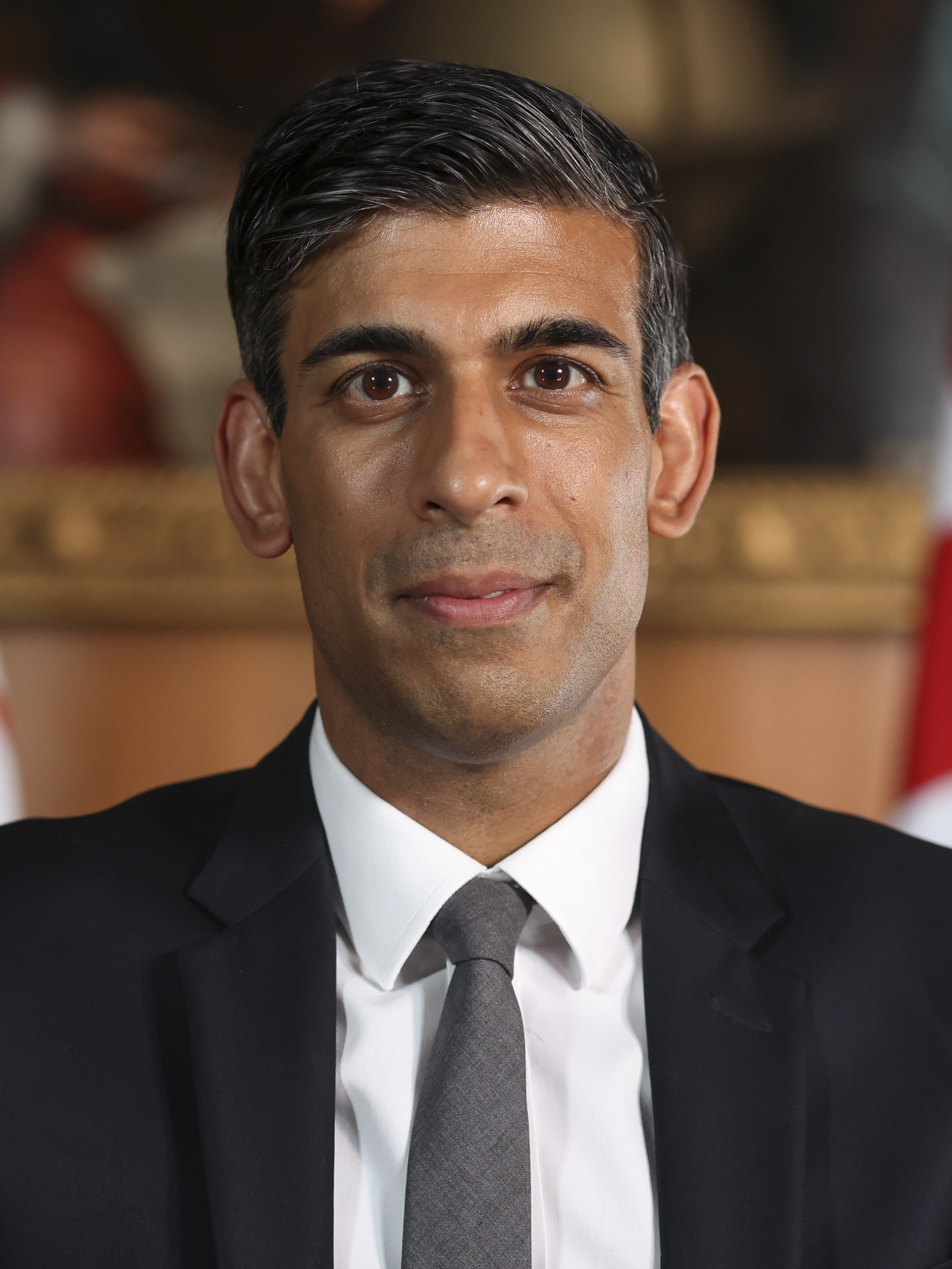
Rishi Sunak

1. Bim Afolami, MP for Hitchin and Harpenden
2. Nickie Aiken, MP for Cities of London and Westminster (previously endorsed Tugendhat)
3. Peter Aldous, MP for Waveney (previously endorsed Mordaunt)
4. Stuart Andrew, MP for Pudsey
5. Caroline Ansell, MP for Eastbourne (previously endorsed Mordaunt)
6. Victoria Atkins, MP for Louth and Horncastle
7. Richard Bacon, MP for South Norfolk
8. Siobhan Baillie, MP for Stroud
9. Steve Barclay, MP for North East Cambridgeshire
10. Simon Baynes, MP for Clwyd South
11. Paul Beresford, MP for Mole Valley (previously endorsed Hunt)
12. Crispin Blunt, MP for Reigate (previously endorsed Hunt)
13. Andrew Bowie, MP for West Aberdeenshire and Kincardine
14. Andrew Bridgen, MP for North West Leicestershire
15. Steve Brine, MP for Winchester (previously endorsed Hunt)
16. Anthony Browne, MP for South Cambridgeshire
17. Robert Buckland, MP for South Swindon (subsequently endorsed Truss)
18. Alun Cairns, MP for Vale of Glamorgan (subsequently endorsed Truss)
19. James Cartlidge, MP for South Suffolk
20. Maria Caulfield, MP for Lewes
21. Alex Chalk, MP for Cheltenham
22. Rehman Chishti, MP for Gillingham and Rainham (previously endorsed Tugendhat)
23. Chris Clarkson, MP for Heywood and Middleton
24. Geoffrey Clifton-Brown, MP for Cotswold
25. Claire Coutinho, MP for East Surrey
26. Geoffrey Cox, MP for Torridge and West Devon
27. Stephen Crabb, MP for Preseli Pembrokeshire
28. Gareth Davies, MP for Grantham and Stamford
29. Philip Davies, MP for Shipley (previously endorsed Hunt)
30. David Davis, MP for Haltemprice and Howden (previously endorsed Mordaunt)
31. Jonathan Djanogly, MP for Huntingdon (previously endorsed Hunt)
32. Steve Double, MP for St Austell and Newquay (previously endorsed Badenoch and Javid)
33. Oliver Dowden, MP for Hertsmere
34. Flick Drummond, MP for Meon Valley
35. Philip Dunne, MP for Ludlow
36. Ruth Edwards, MP for Rushcliffe
37. Michael Ellis, MP for Northampton North
38. George Eustice, MP for Camborne and Redruth (previously endorsed Shapps)
39. Luke Evans, MP for Bosworth (previously endorsed Mordaunt)
40. Laura Farris, MP for Newbury
41. Simon Fell, MP for Barrow and Furness (previously endorsed Tugendhat)
42. Liam Fox, MP for North Somerset
43. Lucy Frazer, MP for South East Cambridgeshire
44. George Freeman, MP for Mid Norfolk (previously endorsed Mordaunt)
45. Louie French, MP for Old Bexley and Sidcup
46. Richard Fuller, MP for North East Bedfordshire
47. Mark Garnier, MP for Wyre Forest
48. Nick Gibb, MP for Bognor Regis and Littlehampton
49. Peter Gibson, MP for Darlington
50. Jo Gideon, MP for Stoke-on-Trent Central (previously endorsed Tugendhat)
51. John Glen, MP for Salisbury
52. Robert Goodwill, MP for Scarborough and Whitby
53. Michael Gove, MP for Surrey Heath (previously endorsed Badenoch)
54. Richard Graham, MP for Gloucester
55. James Gray, MP for North Wiltshire (previously endorsed Mordaunt)
56. Damian Green, MP for Ashford (previously endorsed Mordaunt and Tugendhat)
57. Andrew Griffith, MP for Arundel and South Downs (subsequently endorsed Truss)
58. Robert Halfon, MP for Harlow (previously endorsed Javid)
59. Luke Hall, MP for Thornbury and Yate
60. Stephen Hammond, MP for Wimbledon (previously endorsed Tugendhat)
61. Matt Hancock, MP for West Suffolk
62. Greg Hands, MP for Chelsea and Fulham
63. Mark Harper, MP for Forest of Dean
64. Sally-Ann Hart, MP for Hastings and Rye
65. Simon Hart, MP for Carmarthen West and South Pembrokeshire
66. Damian Hinds, MP for East Hampshire
67. Simon Hoare, MP for North Dorset
68. Richard Holden, MP for North West Durham
69. Kevin Hollinrake, MP for Thirsk and Malton
70. Paul Holmes, MP for Eastleigh (previously endorsed Tugendhat)
71. John Howell, MP for Henley
72. Paul Howell, MP for Sedgefield
73. Nigel Huddleston, MP for Mid Worcestershire
74. Jeremy Hunt, MP for South West Surrey (previously ran for leadership)
75. Robert Jenrick, MP for Newark
76. Andrew Jones, MP for Harrogate and Knaresborough
77. Fay Jones, MP for Brecon and Radnorshire
78. Marcus Jones, MP for Nuneaton
79. Simon Jupp, MP for East Devon
80. Alicia Kearns, MP for Rutland and Melton (previously endorsed Mordaunt)
81. Gillian Keegan, MP for Chichester
82. Greg Knight, MP for East Yorkshire
83. John Lamont, MP for Berwickshire, Roxburgh and Selkirk (previously endorsed Mordaunt)
84. Mark Logan, MP for Bolton North East (previously endorsed Tugendhat)
85. Jonathan Lord, MP for Woking
86. Alan Mak, MP for Havant
87. Anthony Mangnall, MP for Totnes (previously endorsed Hunt)
88. Julie Marson, MP for Hertford and Stortford
89. Paul Maynard, MP for Blackpool North and Cleveleys
90. Mark Menzies, MP for Fylde
91. Huw Merriman, MP for Bexhill and Battle
92. Andrew Mitchell, MP for Sutton Coldfield (previously endorsed Hunt)
93. James Morris, MP for Halesowen and Rowley Regis
94. Andrew Murrison, MP for South West Wiltshire
95. Bob Neill, MP for Bromley and Chislehurst
96. Caroline Nokes, MP for Romsey and Southampton North (previously endorsed Mordaunt)
97. Guy Opperman, MP for Hexham
98. Mark Pawsey, MP for Rugby (previously endorsed Tugendhat)
99. Dan Poulter, MP for Central Suffolk and North Ipswich (previously endorsed Hunt)
100. Rebecca Pow, MP for Taunton Deane
101. Victoria Prentis, MP for Banbury
102. Jeremy Quin, MP for Horsham
103. Will Quince, MP for Colchester
104. Dominic Raab, MP for Esher and Walton
105. Tom Randall, MP for Gedling (previously endorsed Badenoch)
106. Angela Richardson, MP for Guildford
107. David Rutley, MP for Macclesfield
108. Selaine Saxby, MP for North Devon
109. Andrew Selous, MP for South West Bedfordshire
110. Grant Shapps, MP for Welwyn Hatfield (previously ran for leadership)
111. David Simmonds, MP for Ruislip, Northwood and Pinner
112. Chris Skidmore, MP for Kingswood (subsequently endorsed Truss)
113. Julian Smith, MP for Skipton and Ripon
114. Mark Spencer, MP for Sherwood
115. John Stevenson, MP for Carlisle (previously endorsed Tugendhat)
116. Bob Stewart, MP for Beckenham (previously endorsed Mordaunt)
117. Gary Streeter, MP for South West Devon
118. Mel Stride, MP for Central Devon
119. Julian Sturdy, MP for York Outer
120. Desmond Swayne, MP for New Forest West (previously endorsed Braverman and Badenoch)
121. Robert Syms, MP for Poole (previously endorsed Tugendhat)
122. Maggie Throup, MP for Erewash (previously endorsed Zahawi)
123. Edward Timpson, MP for Eddisbury
124. Laura Trott, MP for Sevenoaks
125. Shailesh Vara, MP for North West Cambridgeshire
126. Theresa Villiers, MP for Chipping Barnet
127. Charles Walker, MP for Broxbourne (previously endorsed Mordaunt)
128. Robin Walker, MP for Worcester (previously endorsed Javid)
129. Jamie Wallis, MP for Bridgend (previously endorsed Mordaunt)
130. Matt Warman, MP for Boston and Skegness
131. Helen Whately, MP for Faversham and Mid Kent
132. James Wild, MP for North West Norfolk
133. Craig Williams, MP for Montgomeryshire
134. Gavin Williamson, MP for South Staffordshire
135. Jeremy Wright, MP for Kenilworth and Southam (previously endorsed Javid and Mordaunt)
136. Mike Wood, MP for Dudley South (previously endorsed Javid)
137. Jacob Young, MP for Redcar

=== Liz Truss ===
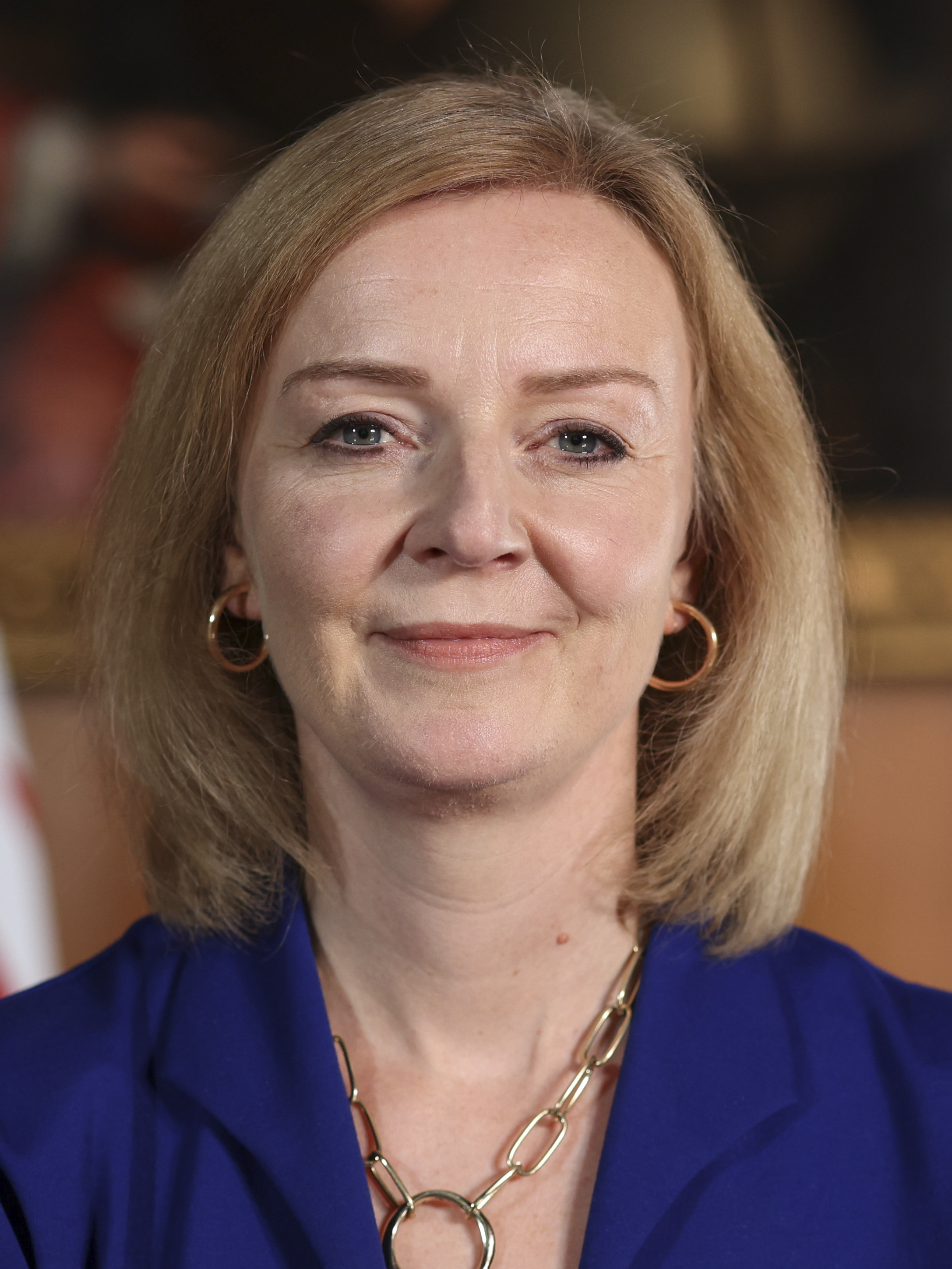
Liz Truss

1. Lucy Allan, MP for Telford (previously endorsed Badenoch)
2. Lee Anderson, MP for Ashfield (previously endorsed Badenoch)
3. Stuart Anderson, MP for Wolverhampton South West
4. Edward Argar, MP for Charnwood (previously endorsed Javid)
5. Sarah Atherton, MP for Wrexham (previously endorsed Mordaunt)
6. Gareth Bacon, MP for Orpington (previously endorsed Badenoch)
7. Shaun Bailey, MP for West Bromwich West
8. Duncan Baker, MP for North Norfolk (previously endorsed Mordaunt)
9. Steve Baker, MP for Wycombe (previously endorsed Braverman)
10. Aaron Bell, MP for Newcastle-under-Lyme (previously endorsed Tugendhat)
11. Scott Benton, MP for Blackpool South (previously endorsed Braverman)
12. Jake Berry, MP for Rossendale and Darwen (previously endorsed Tugendhat)
13. Saqib Bhatti, MP for Meriden (previously endorsed Javid)
14. Bob Blackman, MP for Harrow East
15. Peter Bone, MP for Wellingborough
16. Karen Bradley, MP for Staffordshire Moorlands (previously endorsed Tugendhat)
17. Suella Braverman, MP for Fareham (previously ran for leadership)
18. Paul Bristow, MP for Peterborough (previously endorsed Shapps)
19. Sara Britcliffe, MP for Hyndburn (previously endorsed Zahawi)
20. Felicity Buchan, MP for Kensington
21. Robert Buckland, MP for South Swindon (previously endorsed Sunak)
22. Alex Burghart, MP for Brentwood and Ongar (previously endorsed Badenoch)
23. Conor Burns, MP for Bournemouth West
24. Rob Butler, MP for Aylesbury
25. Alun Cairns, MP for Vale of Glamorgan (previously endorsed Sunak)
26. Andy Carter, MP for Warrington South
27. Bill Cash, MP for Stone
28. Christopher Chope, MP for Christchurch
29. Simon Clarke, MP for Middlesbrough South and East Cleveland
30. Brendan Clarke-Smith, MP for Bassetlaw
31. James Cleverly , MP for Braintree
32. Thérèse Coffey, MP for Suffolk Coastal
33. Damian Collins, MP for Folkestone and Hythe (previously endorsed Mordaunt)
34. Alberto Costa, MP for South Leicestershire (previously endorsed Mordaunt)
35. Virginia Crosbie, MP for Ynys Môn (previously endorsed Javid)
36. James Daly, MP for Bury North (previously endorsed Tugendhat)
37. David TC Davies, MP for Monmouth
38. James Davies, MP for Vale of Clwyd (previously endorsed Mordaunt and Shapps)
39. Mims Davies, MP for Mid Sussex (previously endorsed Mordaunt)
40. Dehenna Davison, MP for Bishop Auckland
41. Sarah Dines, MP for Derbyshire Dales (previously endorsed Badenoch)
42. Leo Docherty, MP for Aldershot (previously endorsed Badenoch)
43. Michelle Donelan, MP for Chippenham (previously endorsed Mordaunt and Zahawi)
44. Nadine Dorries, MP for Mid Bedfordshire
45. Jackie Doyle-Price, MP for Thurrock
46. Richard Drax, MP for South Dorset (previously endorsed Braverman)
47. James Duddridge, MP for Rochford and Southend East
48. David Duguid, MP for Banff and Buchan
49. Iain Duncan Smith, MP for Chingford and Woodford Green
50. Mark Eastwood, MP for Dewsbury
51. Natalie Elphicke, MP for Dover (previously endorsed Mordaunt)
52. David Evennett, MP for Bexleyheath and Crayford
53. Michael Fabricant, MP for Lichfield (previously endorsed Mordaunt)
54. Anna Firth, MP for Southend West
55. Katherine Fletcher, MP for South Ribble
56. Mark Fletcher, MP for Bolsover (previously endorsed Zahawi)
57. Nick Fletcher, MP for Don Valley (previously endorsed Badenoch)
58. Vicky Ford, MP for Chelmsford
59. Kevin Foster, MP for Torbay
60. Mark Francois, MP for Rayleigh and Wickford
61. Mike Freer, MP for Finchley and Golders Green
62. Marcus Fysh, MP for Yeovil
63. Nus Ghani, MP for Wealden
64. Chris Green, MP for Bolton West (previously endorsed Tugendhat)
65. Andrew Griffith, MP for Arundel and South Downs (previously endorsed Sunak)
66. James Grundy, MP for Leigh
67. Jonathan Gullis, MP for Stoke-on-Trent North (previously endorsed Zahawi)
68. Rebecca Harris, MP for Castle Point
69. Trudy Harrison, MP for Copeland (previously endorsed Mordaunt and Shapps)
70. John Hayes, MP for South Holland and the Deepings (previously endorsed Braverman and Badenoch)
71. Oliver Heald, MP for North East Hertfordshire (previously endorsed Hunt)
72. James Heappey, MP for Wells
73. Gordon Henderson, MP for Sittingbourne and Sheppey (previously endorsed Mordaunt)
74. Darren Henry, MP for Broxtowe
75. Antony Higginbotham, MP for Burnley (previously endorsed Mordaunt)
76. Adam Holloway, MP for Gravesham
77. Tom Hunt, MP for Ipswich (previously endorsed Badenoch)
78. Sajid Javid, MP for Bromsgrove (previously ran for leadership)
79. Ranil Jayawardena, MP for North East Hampshire
80. Mark Jenkinson, MP for Workington (previously endorsed Zahawi)
81. Andrea Jenkyns, MP for Morley and Outwood
82. Caroline Johnson, MP for Sleaford and North Hykeham (previously endorsed Badenoch)
83. Gareth Johnson, MP for Dartford
84. David Jones, MP for Clwyd West (previously endorsed Braverman)
85. Daniel Kawczynski, MP for Shrewsbury and Atcham (previously endorsed Hunt)
86. Julian Knight, MP for Solihull
87. Danny Kruger, MP for Devizes (previously endorsed Braverman)
88. Kwasi Kwarteng, MP for Spelthorne
89. Pauline Latham, MP for Mid Derbyshire (previously endorsed Badenoch and Javid)
90. Andrea Leadsom, MP for South Northamptonshire (previously endorsed Mordaunt)
91. Edward Leigh, MP for Gainsborough
92. Ian Levy, MP for Blyth Valley (previously endorsed Mordaunt)
93. Andrew Lewer, MP for Northampton South (previously endorsed Badenoch)
94. Brandon Lewis, MP for Great Yarmouth (previously endorsed Zahawi)
95. Julian Lewis, MP for New Forest East (previously endorsed Braverman)
96. Chris Loder, MP for West Dorset
97. Marco Longhi, MP for Dudley North (previously endorsed Badenoch)
98. Julia Lopez, MP for Hornchurch and Upminster (previously endorsed Badenoch)
99. Craig Mackinlay, MP for South Thanet
100. Cherilyn Mackrory, MP for Truro and Falmouth
101. Rachel Maclean, MP for Redditch (previously endorsed Badenoch and Javid)
102. Scott Mann, MP for North Cornwall
103. Jerome Mayhew, MP for Broadland (previously endorsed Mordaunt)
104. Jason McCartney, MP for Colne Valley (previously endorsed Braverman)
105. Stephen McPartland, MP for Stevenage
106. Stephen Metcalfe, MP for South Basildon and East Thurrock (previously endorsed Braverman)
107. Robin Millar, MP for Aberconwy (previously endorsed Braverman)
108. Maria Miller, MP for Basingstoke (previously endorsed Mordaunt)
109. Amanda Milling, MP for Cannock Chase (previously endorsed Zahawi)
110. Nigel Mills, MP for Amber Valley (previously endorsed Badenoch)
111. Damien Moore, MP for Southport (previously endorsed Tugendhat)
112. Penny Mordaunt, MP for Portsmouth North (previously ran for leadership)
113. Anne Marie Morris, MP for Newton Abbot (previously endorsed Tugendhat)
114. Joy Morrissey, MP for Beaconsfield
115. Wendy Morton, MP for Aldridge-Brownhills
116. Kieran Mullan, MP for Crewe and Nantwich (previously endorsed Mordaunt)
117. David Mundell, MP for Dumfriesshire, Clydesdale and Tweeddale
118. Sheryll Murray, MP for South East Cornwall (previously endorsed Shapps)
119. Lia Nici, MP for Great Grimsby
120. Matthew Offord, MP for Hendon
121. Mike Penning, MP for Hemel Hempstead (previously endorsed Mordaunt)
122. John Penrose, MP for Weston-super-Mare (previously endorsed Mordaunt)
123. Chris Philp, MP for Croydon South (previously endorsed Javid)
124. Mark Pritchard, MP for The Wrekin (previously endorsed Shapps)
125. Tom Pursglove, MP for Corby
126. John Redwood, MP for Wokingham
127. Jacob Rees-Mogg, MP for North East Somerset
128. Nicola Richards, MP for West Bromwich East (previously endorsed Mordaunt)
129. Laurence Robertson, MP for Tewkesbury
130. Mary Robinson, MP for Cheadle (previously endorsed Javid)
131. Andrew Rosindell, MP for Romford
132. Lee Rowley, MP for North East Derbyshire (previously endorsed Badenoch)
133. Dean Russell, MP for Watford
134. Paul Scully, MP for Sutton and Cheam
135. Bob Seely, MP for Isle of Wight (previously endorsed Mordaunt)
136. Alec Shelbrooke, MP for Elmet and Rothwell
137. Chris Skidmore, MP for Kingswood (previously endorsed Sunak)
138. Chloe Smith, MP for Norwich North
139. Greg Smith, MP for Buckingham (previously endorsed Braverman)
140. Henry Smith, MP for Crawley (previously endorsed Braverman)
141. Amanda Solloway, MP for Derby North
142. Alexander Stafford, MP for Rother Valley
143. Jane Stevenson, MP for Wolverhampton North East
144. Graham Stuart, MP for Beverley and Holderness (previously endorsed Shapps)
145. James Sunderland, MP for Bracknell (previously endorsed Mordaunt)
146. Derek Thomas, MP for St Ives (previously endorsed Mordaunt)
147. Craig Tracey, MP for North Warwickshire (previously endorsed Mordaunt)
148. Anne-Marie Trevelyan, MP for Berwick-upon-Tweed (previously endorsed Tugendhat)
149. Tom Tugendhat, MP for Tonbridge and Malling (previously ran for leadership)
150. Ben Wallace, MP for Wyre and Preston North
151. Giles Watling, MP for Clacton
152. Suzanne Webb, MP for Stourbridge
153. Heather Wheeler, MP for South Derbyshire (previously endorsed Mordaunt)
154. Craig Whittaker, MP for Calder Valley
155. John Whittingdale, MP for Maldon
156. Bill Wiggin, MP for North Herefordshire (previously endorsed Badenoch)
157. Nadhim Zahawi, MP for Stratford-on-Avon(previously ran for leadership)

=== Tom Tugendhat ===
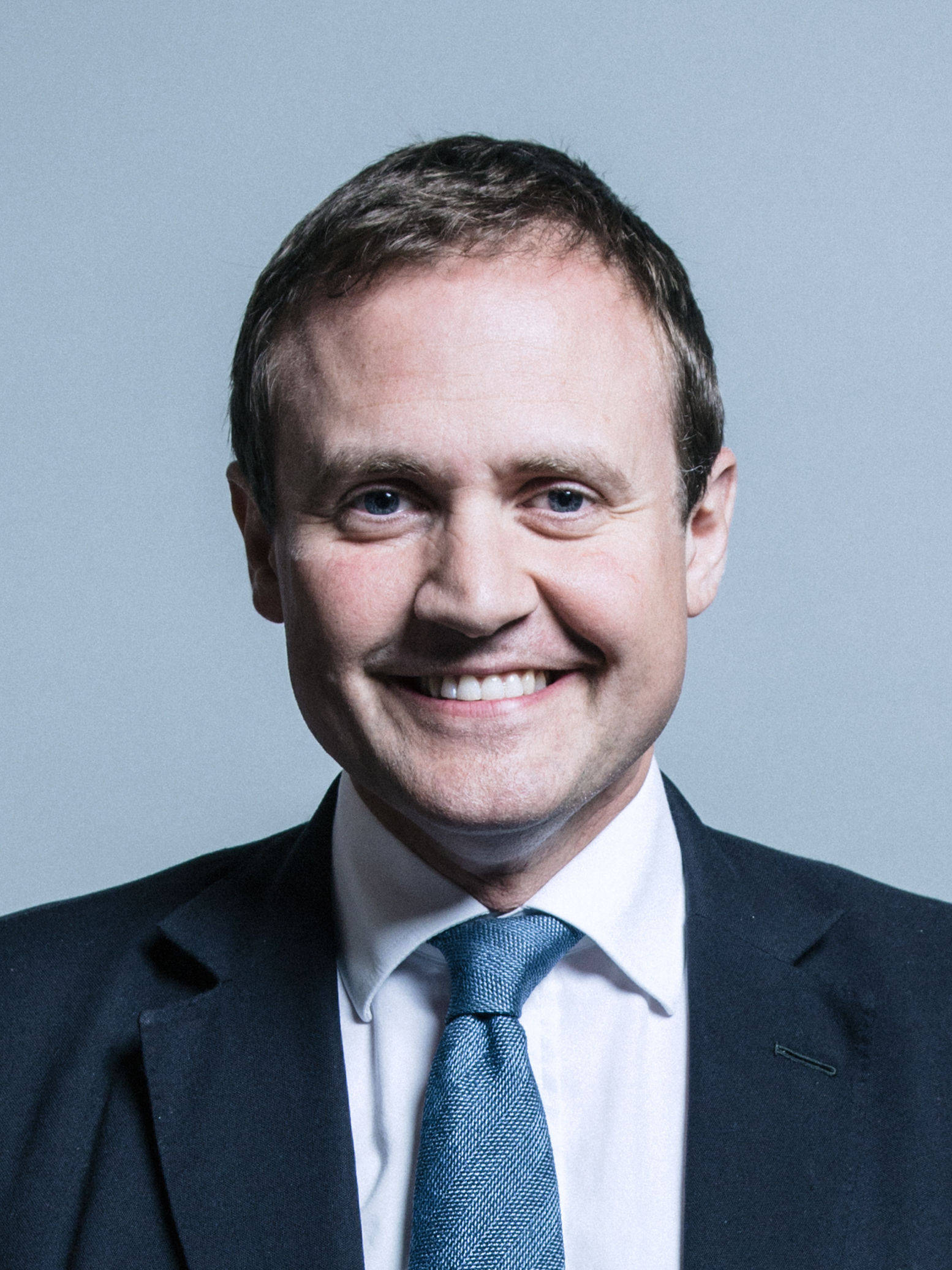
Tom Tugendhat (eliminated after 3rd round; subsequently endorsed Truss)

1. Nickie Aiken, MP for Cities of London and Westminster (subsequently endorsed Sunak)
2. Aaron Bell, MP for Newcastle-under-Lyme (subsequently endorsed Truss)
3. Jake Berry, MP for Rossendale and Darwen (subsequently endorsed Truss)
4. Karen Bradley, MP for Staffordshire Moorlands (subsequently endorsed Truss)
5. Rehman Chishti, MP for Gillingham and Rainham (subsequently endorsed Sunak)
6. James Daly, MP for Bury North (subsequently endorsed Truss)
7. Simon Fell, MP for Barrow and Furness (subsequently endorsed Sunak)
8. Jo Gideon, MP for Stoke-on-Trent Central (subsequently endorsed Sunak)
9. Chris Green, MP for Bolton West (subsequently endorsed Truss)
10. Damian Green, MP for Ashford (subsequently endorsed Mordaunt, then Sunak)
11. Stephen Hammond, MP for Wimbledon (subsequently endorsed Sunak)
12. Paul Holmes, MP for Eastleigh (subsequently endorsed Sunak)
13. Neil Hudson, MP for Penrith and The Border
14. Robert Largan, MP for High Peak
15. Mark Logan, MP for Bolton North East (subsequently endorsed Sunak)
16. Damien Moore, MP for Southport (subsequently endorsed Truss)
17. Anne Marie Morris, MP for Newton Abbot (subsequently endorsed Truss)
18. Mark Pawsey, MP for Rugby (subsequently endorsed Sunak)
19. Ben Spencer, MP for Runnymede and Weybridge
20. John Stevenson, MP for Carlisle (subsequently endorsed Sunak)
21. Robert Syms, MP for Poole (subsequently endorsed Sunak)
22. Anne-Marie Trevelyan, MP for Berwick-upon-Tweed (subsequently endorsed Truss)

=== Nadhim Zahawi ===
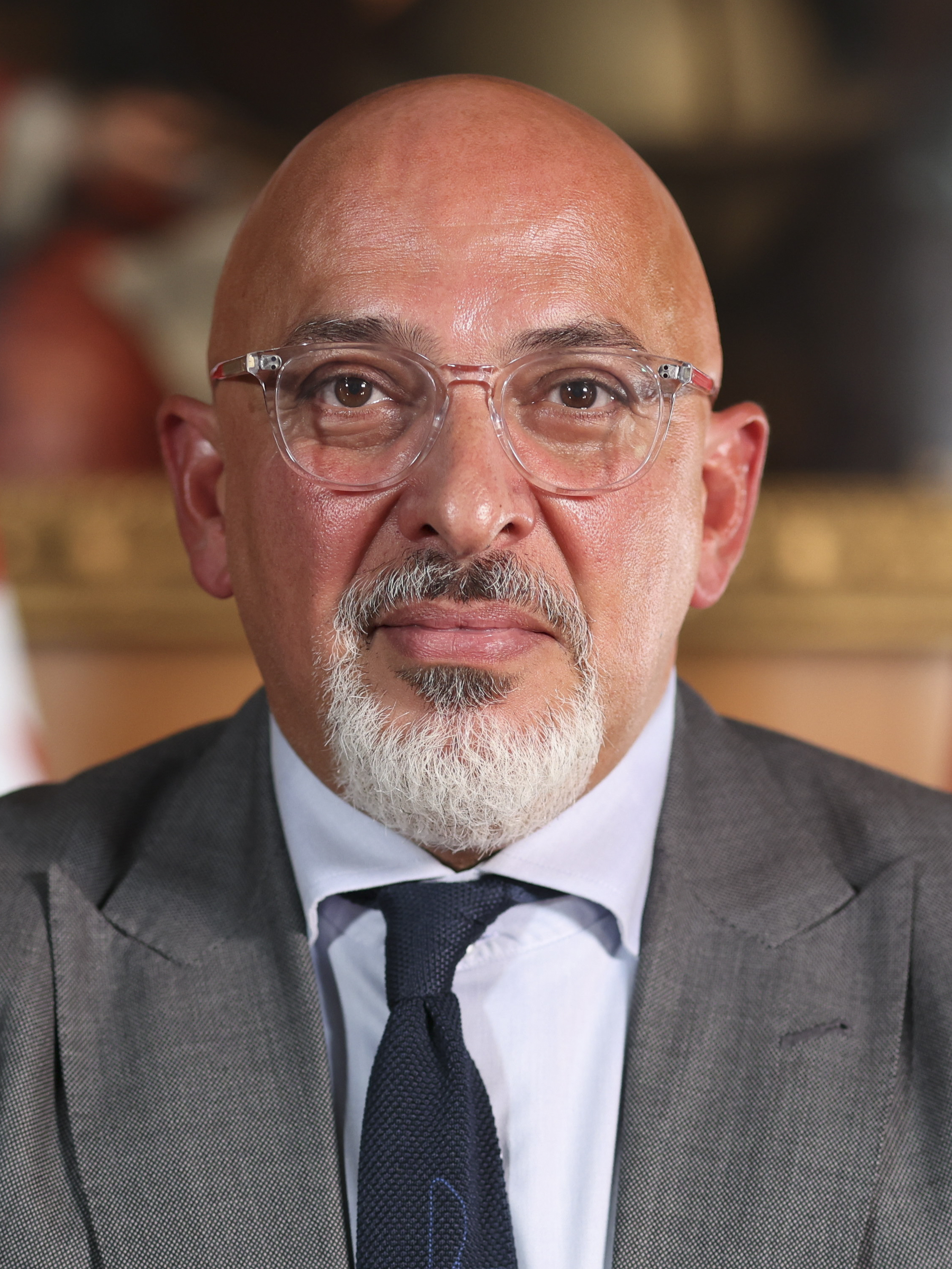
Nadhim Zahawi (eliminated after 1st round; subsequently endorsed Truss)

1. Jack Brereton, MP for Stoke-on-Trent South (subsequently endorsed Mordaunt)
2. Sara Britcliffe, MP for Hyndburn (subsequently endorsed Truss)
3. Michelle Donelan, MP for Chippenham (subsequently endorsed Mordaunt, then Truss)
4. Tobias Ellwood, MP for Bournemouth East (subsequently endorsed Mordaunt; whip suspended on 19 July)
5. Ben Everitt, MP for Milton Keynes North
6. Mark Fletcher, MP for Bolsover (subsequently endorsed Truss)
7. Jonathan Gullis, MP for Stoke-on-Trent North (subsequently endorsed Truss)
8. Mark Jenkinson, MP for Workington (subsequently endorsed Truss)
9. David Johnston, MP for Wantage
10. Brandon Lewis, MP for Great Yarmouth (subsequently endorsed Truss)
11. Amanda Milling, MP for Cannock Chase (subsequently endorsed Truss)
12. Jesse Norman, MP for Hereford and South Herefordshire
13. Paul Scully, MP for Sutton and Cheam
14. Maggie Throup, MP for Erewash (subsequently endorsed Sunak)

== Former MPs ==
This list does not include former MPs that became peers

=== Rishi Sunak ===
1. Paul Goodman, former MP for Wycombe (2001–10) and editor of ConservativeHome
2. David Lidington, former MP for Aylesbury (1992-2019) and former cabinet minister
3. David Mellor, former MP for Putney (1979-1997) and former cabinet minister

=== Penny Mordaunt ===
1. Julian Brazier, former MP for Canterbury (1987–2017)

=== Liz Truss ===
1. Ann Widdecombe, former MEP for South West England (2019-2020) and former MP for Maidstone and The Weald (1987–2010)

== Peers ==
=== Kemi Badenoch ===
1. The Lord Agnew of Oulton
2. The Baroness Cavdendish of Little Venice
3. The Lord Coe
4. The Baroness Fox of Buckley (non-affiliated)
5. The Baroness Stowell of Beeston

=== Liz Truss ===
1. The Lord Ahmad of Wimbledon
2. The Lord Frost of Allenton
3. The Lord Harris of Peckham
4. The Viscount Ridley

=== Penny Mordaunt ===
1. The Baroness Foster of Oxton

=== Rishi Sunak ===
1. The Lord Howard of Lympne
2. The Baroness Davidson of Lundin Links
3. The Lord Hague of Richmond
4. Nigel Lawson
5. The Lord Lilley

== Members of devolved legislatures ==
=== Rishi Sunak ===
1. Jeremy Balfour, MSP for Lothian
2. Miles Briggs, MSP for Lothian
3. Donald Cameron, MSP for Highlands and Islands
4. Jackson Carlaw, MSP for Eastwood
5. James Evans, MS for Brecon and Radnorshire (subsequently endorsed Truss)
6. Maurice Golden, MSP for North East Scotland
7. Sam Kurtz, MS for Carmarthen West and South Pembrokeshire
8. Dean Lockhart, MSP for Mid Scotland and Fife
9. Liz Smith, MSP for Mid Scotland and Fife
10. Alexander Stewart, MSP for Mid Scotland and Fife

=== Liz Truss ===
1. Finlay Carson, MSP for Galloway and West Dumfries
2. Sharon Dowey, MSP for South Scotland
3. James Evans, MS for Brecon and Radnorshire (previously endorsed Sunak)
4. Murdo Fraser, MSP for Mid Scotland and Fife
5. Rachael Hamilton, MSP for Ettrick, Roxburgh and Berwickshire
6. Liam Kerr, MSP for North East Scotland
7. Stephen Kerr, MSP for Central Scotland (previously endorsed Tugendhat)
8. Douglas Lumsden, MSP for North East Scotland
9. Oliver Mundell, MSP for Dumfriesshire
10. Graham Simpson, MSP for Central Scotland

=== Tom Tugendhat ===
1. Stephen Kerr, MSP for Central Scotland (subsequently endorsed Truss)

== Directly elected mayors ==
=== Jeremy Hunt ===
1. Andy Street, Mayor of the West Midlands (subsequently endorsed Truss)

=== Rishi Sunak ===
1. Ben Houchen, Mayor of Tees Valley

=== Liz Truss ===
1. Andy Street, Mayor of West Midlands (previously endorsed Hunt)

== Individuals ==
=== Kemi Badenoch ===
1. Glynis Barber, actress
2. Julie Bindel, feminist campaigner and journalist
3. Sharron Davies, former Olympic swimmer
4. Leo McKinstry, journalist, historian and author
5. Fraser Nelson, journalist and editor of The Spectator (subsequently endorsed Sunak)
6. Patrick O'Flynn, journalist and former UKIP MEP for East of England (subsequently endorsed Truss)
7. Calvin Robinson, political commentator, teacher and church deacon
8. Aris Roussinos, journalist and writer for UnHerd
9. David Starkey, historian and presenter
10. Andrew Sullivan, writer and journalist
11. Damian Thompson, journalist
12. Robert Tombs, historian, professor and author

=== Suella Braverman ===
1. Nigel Farage, broadcaster and former UKIP leader (subsequently endorsed Badenoch)

=== Sajid Javid ===
1. Benedict Rogers, human rights activist and journalist

=== Penny Mordaunt ===
1. Gerard Lyons, economist
2. Allison Pearson, columnist and author
3. Lesia Vasylenko, Ukrainian politician
4. Vasyl Virastyuk, Ukrainian politician

=== Rishi Sunak ===
1. James Forsyth, journalist
2. Fraser Nelson, journalist and Editor of The Spectator
3. Adar Poonawalla, Indian businessman
4. Emily Sheffield, journalist

=== Liz Truss ===
1. Arlene Foster, former first minister of Northern Ireland
2. Patrick O'Flynn, journalist and former UKIP MEP for East of England (previously endorsed Badenoch)
3. Daphne Trimble, former NIHRC and ECNI member and widow of David Trimble

=== Tom Tugendhat ===
1. Bret Stephens, American journalist

== Publications ==
Publications	2019 general election main endorsement	Candidate	Link
The Times	Conservative Party	Rishi Sunak	
The Daily Telegraph	Conservative Party	Liz Truss	
The Sunday Telegraph	Conservative Party	Liz Truss	
The Daily Mail	Conservative Party	Liz Truss	
The Daily Express	Conservative Party	Liz Truss	
The Sunday Express	Conservative Party	Liz Truss	
Evening Standard	Conservative Party	Liz Truss	
