= South East Derbyshire (constituency) =

Parliamentary constituency in the United Kingdom, 1950–1983

- Former county constituency for the House of Commons
- South East Derbyshire in Derbyshire, showing boundaries used from 1974 to 1983.

1950–1983
- Seats: one
- Created from: South Derbyshire
- Replaced by: Erewash, Derbyshire South and Amber Valley

South East Derbyshire was a parliamentary constituency in Derbyshire. It returned one Member of Parliament to the House of Commons of the Parliament of the United Kingdom, elected by the first past the post voting system.

The constituency was created for the 1950 general election, and abolished for the 1983 general election.

== Boundaries ==
1950–1955: The Urban District of Long Eaton, and the Rural District of Shardlow.

1955–1974: The Urban District of Long Eaton, and the Rural District of Shardlow except the parishes included in the Derby North and Derby South constituencies (Chaddesden and Littleover).

1974–1983: The Urban District of Long Eaton, and the Rural District of South East Derbyshire.

== Members of Parliament ==
Election	Member	Party
1950	Joe Champion	Labour
1959	John Jackson	Conservative
1964	Trevor Park	Labour
1970	Peter Rost	Conservative
1983	constituency abolished	

== Elections ==
=== Elections in the 1950s ===
General election 1950: South East Derbyshire
Party	Candidate	Votes	%	±%
Labour	Arthur Champion	30,039	49.06	
Conservative	John Charles Jennings	24,789	40.49	
Liberal	Maldwyn James	6,396	10.45	
Majority		5,250	8.57	
Turnout		61,224	86.94	
Labour win (new seat)				

General election 1951: South East Derbyshire
Party	Candidate	Votes	%	±%
Labour	Arthur Champion	33,020	52.68	
Conservative	John Charles Jennings	29,663	47.32	
Majority		3,357	5.36	
Turnout		62,683	86.41	
Labour hold		Swing		

General election 1955: South East Derbyshire
Party	Candidate	Votes	%	±%
Labour	Arthur Champion	25,620	51.59	
Conservative	John Jackson	24,039	48.41	
Majority		1,581	3.18	
Turnout		49,659	82.11	
Labour hold		Swing		

General election 1959: South East Derbyshire
Party	Candidate	Votes	%	±%
Conservative	John Jackson	25,374	45.54	
Labour	Arthur Champion	25,362	45.52	
Liberal	Thomas Lynch	4,980	8.94	New
Majority		12	0.02	N/A
Turnout		55,716	85.12	
Conservative gain from Labour		Swing		

=== Elections in the 1960s ===
General election 1964: South East Derbyshire
Party	Candidate	Votes	%	±%
Labour	Trevor Park	29,528	50.75	
Conservative	Peter Myers	28,655	49.25	
Majority		873	1.50	N/A
Turnout		58,183	82.83	
Labour gain from Conservative		Swing		

General election 1966: South East Derbyshire
Party	Candidate	Votes	%	±%
Labour	Trevor Park	32,407	54.63	
Conservative	Peter Myers	26,911	45.37	
Majority		5,496	9.26	
Turnout		59,318	81.76	
Labour hold		Swing		

=== Elections in the 1970s ===
General election 1970: South East Derbyshire
Party	Candidate	Votes	%	±%
Conservative	Peter Rost	32,185	52.21	
Labour	John Ryman	29,461	47.79	
Majority		2,724	4.42	N/A
Turnout		61,646	75.46	
Conservative gain from Labour		Swing		

General election February 1974: South East Derbyshire
Party	Candidate	Votes	%	±%
Conservative	Peter Rost	20,016	44.11	
Labour	JW Wardle	16,981	37.42	
Liberal	F Fry	8,378	18.46	New
Majority		3,035	6.69	
Turnout		45,375	85.11	
Conservative hold		Swing		

General election October 1974: South East Derbyshire
Party	Candidate	Votes	%	±%
Conservative	Peter Rost	18,856	43.74	
Labour	RJ Madeley	17,851	41.41	
Liberal	H Warschauer	6,404	14.85	
Majority		1,005	2.33	
Turnout		43,111	80.22	
Conservative hold		Swing		

General election 1979: South East Derbyshire
Party	Candidate	Votes	%	±%
Conservative	Peter Rost	24,004	51.47	
Labour	Gerry Bermingham	16,617	35.63	
Liberal	Richard Lustig	5,518	11.83	
National Front	C Neil	498	1.07	New
Majority		7,387	15.84	
Turnout		46,637	81.09	
Conservative hold		Swing		

== See also ==
- List of former United Kingdom Parliament constituencies
- Unreformed House of Commons
