= Health and Social Care Select Committee =

UK House of Commons select committee

- Abbreviation: HSC/HSCC/HSCSC
- Formation: 1979
- Purpose: Select Committee of Parliament responsible for oversight of the DHSC and its associated agencies and public bodies.
- Chair: Layla Moran
- Formerly called: Health Select Committee; Social Services Committee

The Health and Social Care Select Committee (abbreviated to HSC, HSCC and HSCSC) is a Departmental Select Committee of the British House of Commons, the lower house of the United Kingdom Parliament. Its remit is to examine the policy, administration and expenditure of the Department of Health and Social Care (DHSC) and its associated agencies and public bodies.

== Chairs ==
Committee chairs include those listed below.

Name	Start	End	Party	Constituency
Nicholas Winterton	1 January 1991	1 January 1992	Conservative	Macclesfield
Marion Roe	1 January 1992	21 March 1997	Conservative	Broxbourne
David Hinchliffe	14 July 1997	11 April 2005	Labour	Wakefield
Kevin Barron	18 July 2005	6 May 2010	Labour	Rother Valley
Stephen Dorrell	10 June 2010	4 June 2014	Conservative	Charnwood
Sarah Wollaston	18 June 2014	6 November 2019	Conservative	Totnes
Jeremy Hunt	29 January 2020	16 October 2022	Conservative	South West Surrey
Steve Brine	2 November 2022	30 May 2024	Conservative	Winchester
Layla Moran	9 September 2024	30 April 2025	Liberal Democrats	Oxford West and Abingdon
Paulette Hamilton; Acting	30 April 2025	13 October 2025	Labour	Birmingham Erdington
Layla Moran	13 October 2025	present	Liberal Democrats	Oxford West and Abingdon

== Current membership ==
Membership of the committee is as follows:

Member	Party	Constituency
Layla Moran MP (Chair)	Liberal Democrats	Oxford West and Abingdon
Paulette Hamilton MP (Vice Chair)	Labour	Birmingham Erdington
Sadik Al-Hassan MP	Labour	North Somerset
Danny Beales MP	Labour	Uxbridge and South Ruislip
Ben Coleman MP	Labour	Chelsea and Fulham
Jen Craft MP	Labour	Thurrock
Josh Fenton-Glynn MP	Labour	Calder Valley
Allison Gardner MP	Labour	Stoke-on-Trent South
Andrew George MP	Liberal Democrats	St Ives
Joe Robertson MP	Conservative	Isle of Wight East
Greg Stafford MP	Conservative	Farnham and Bordon

=== Changes since 2024 ===
Date	Outgoing Member & Party	Constituency	→	New Member & Party	Constituency	Source
17 March 2025	Deirdre Costigan MP (Labour)	Ealing Southall	→	Alex McIntyre MP (Labour)	Gloucester	Hansard
26 October 2026	Beccy Cooper MP (Labour)	Worthing West	→	Sadik Al-Hassan MP (Labour)	North Somerset	Hansard
26 October 2026	Alex McIntyre MP (Labour)	Gloucester	→	Allison Gardner MP (Labour)	Stoke-on-Trent South	Hansard

== 2019-2024 Parliament ==
The chair was elected on 29 January 2020, with the members of the committee being announced on 2 March 2020.

Member	Party	Constituency
Jeremy Hunt MP (Chair)	Conservative	South West Surrey
Paul Bristow MP	Conservative	Peterborough
Amy Callaghan MP	SNP	East Dunbartonshire
Rosie Cooper MP	Labour	West Lancashire
James Davies MP	Conservative	Vale of Clwyd
Luke Evans MP	Conservative	Bosworth
James Murray MP	Labour	Ealing North
Taiwo Owatemi MP	Labour	Coventry North West
Sarah Owen MP	Labour	Luton North
Dean Russell MP	Conservative	Watford
Laura Trott MP	Conservative	Sevenoaks

=== Changes 2019-2024 ===
Date	Outgoing Member & Party	Constituency	→	New Member & Party	Constituency	Source
11 May 2020	James Murray MP (Labour)	Ealing North	→	Barbara Keeley MP (Labour)	Worsley and Eccles South	Hansard
29 June 2020	Amy Callaghan MP (SNP)	East Dunbartonshire	→	Neale Hanvey MP (SNP)	Kirkcaldy and Cowdenbeath	Hansard
25 May 2021	Neale Hanvey MP (Alba)	Kirkcaldy and Cowdenbeath	→	Anum Qaisar MP (SNP)	Airdrie and Shotts	Hansard
2 November 2021	James Davies MP (Conservative)	Vale of Clwyd	→	Lucy Allan MP (Conservative)	Telford	Hansard
5 January 2022	Anum Qaisar MP (SNP)	Airdrie and Shotts	→	Martyn Day MP (SNP)	Linlithgow and East Falkirk	Hansard
23 May 2022	Paul Bristow MP (Conservative)	Peterborough	→	Marco Longhi MP (Conservative)	Dudley North	Hansard
4 July 2022	Barbara Keeley MP (Labour)	Worsley and Eccles South	→	Paulette Hamilton MP (Labour)	Birmingham Erdington	Hansard
4 July 2022	Sarah Owen MP (Labour)	Luton North	→	Rachael Maskell MP (Labour)	York Central	Hansard
17 October 2022	Jeremy Hunt MP (Chair, Conservative)	South West Surrey	→	Vacant		Hansard
20 October 2022	Dean Russell MP (Conservative)	Watford	→	Helen Whately MP (Conservative)	Faversham and Mid Kent	Hansard
20 October 2022	Marco Longhi MP (Conservative)	Dudley North	→	James Morris MP (Conservative)	Halesowen and Rowley Regis	Hansard
2 November 2022	Vacant		→	Steve Brine MP (Chair, Conservative)	Winchester	Hansard
8 November 2022	Helen Whately MP (Conservative)	Faversham and Mid Kent	→	Chris Green MP (Conservative)	Bolton West	Hansard
21 November 2022	Laura Trott MP (Conservative)	Sevenoaks	→	Caroline Johnson MP (Conservative)	Sleaford and North Hykeham	Hansard
29 November 2022	Luke Evans MP (Conservative)	Bosworth	→	Paul Bristow MP (Conservative)	Peterborough	Hansard
30 November 2022	Rosie Cooper MP (Labour)	West Lancashire	→	Vacant		Resignation of member from Parliament
13 December 2022	Vacant		→	Paul Blomfield MP (Labour)	Sheffield Central	Hansard
12 September 2023	Martyn Day MP (SNP)	Linlithgow and East Falkirk	→	Amy Callaghan MP (SNP)	East Dunbartonshire	Hansard

== 2017-2019 Parliament ==
Sarah Wollaston was re-elected as Chair on 12 July 2017, with other members elected on 11 September 2017 as follows:

Member	Party	Constituency
Dr Sarah Wollaston MP (Chair)	Conservative	Totnes
Luciana Berger MP	Labour	Liverpool Wavertree
Ben Bradshaw MP	Labour	Exeter
Dr Lisa Cameron MP	Scottish National Party	East Kilbride, Strathaven and Lesmahagow
Rosie Cooper MP	Labour	West Lancashire
Dr Caroline Johnson MP	Conservative	Sleaford and North Hykeham
Diana Johnson MP	Labour	Kingston upon Hull North
Johnny Mercer MP	Conservative	Plymouth Moor View
Andrew Selous MP	Conservative	South West Bedfordshire
Maggie Throup MP	Conservative	Erewash
Dr Paul Williams MP	Labour	Stockton South

=== Changes 2017-2019 ===
Date	Outgoing Member & Party	Constituency	→	New Member & Party	Constituency	Source
20 February 2018	Dr Caroline Johnson MP (Conservative)	Sleaford and North Hykeham	→	Derek Thomas MP (Conservative)	St Ives	Hansard
20 February 2018	Maggie Throup MP (Conservative)	Erewash	→	Martin Vickers MP (Conservative)	Cleethorpes	Hansard
14 January 2018	Dr Lisa Cameron MP (SNP)	East Kilbride, Strathaven and Lesmahagow	→	Dr Philippa Whitford MP (SNP)	Central Ayrshire	Hansard
13 May 2019	Dr Philippa Whitford MP (SNP)	Central Ayrshire	→	Angela Crawley MP (SNP)	Lanark and Hamilton East	Hansard
15 July 2019	Martin Vickers MP (Conservative)	Cleethorpes	→	Anne Marie Morris MP (Conservative)	Newton Abbot	Hansard

== 2015-2017 Parliament ==
The chair was elected on 18 June 2015, with members being announced on 8 July 2015.

Member	Party	Constituency
Dr Sarah Wollaston MP (Chair)	Conservative	Totnes
Dr James Davies MP	Conservative	Vale of Clwyd
Andrea Jenkyns MP	Conservative	Morley and Outwood
Liz McInnes MP	Labour	Heywood and Middleton
Rachael Maskell MP	Labour and Co-op	York Central
Andrew Percy MP	Conservative	Brigg and Goole
Paula Sherriff MP	Labour	Dewsbury
Emily Thornberry MP	Labour	Islington South and Finsbury
Maggie Throup MP	Conservative	Erewash
Helen Whately MP	Conservative	Faversham and Mid Kent
Dr Philippa Whitford MP	Scottish National Party	Central Ayrshire

=== Changes 2015-2017 ===
Date	Outgoing Member & Party	Constituency	→	New Member & Party	Constituency	Source
26 October 2015	Rachael Maskell MP (Labour and Co-op)	York Central	→	Ben Bradshaw MP (Labour)	Exeter	Hansard
26 October 2015	Liz McInnes MP (Labour)	Heywood and Middleton	→	Julie Cooper MP (Labour)	Burnley	Hansard
26 October 2015	Emily Thornberry MP (Labour)	Islington South and Finsbury	→	Emma Reynolds MP (Labour)	Wolverhampton North East	Hansard
31 October 2016	Julie Cooper MP (Labour)	Burnley	→	Heidi Alexander MP (Labour)	Lewisham East	Hansard
31 October 2016	Emma Reynolds MP (Labour)	Wolverhampton North East	→	Luciana Berger MP (Labour and Co-op)	Liverpool Wavertree	Hansard
31 October 2016	Paula Sherriff MP (Labour)	Dewsbury	→	Rosie Cooper MP (Labour)	West Lancashire	Hansard
31 October 2016	Andrew Percy MP (Conservative)	Brigg and Goole	→	Andrew Selous MP (Conservative)	South West Bedfordshire	Hansard

== 2010-2015 Parliament ==
The chair was elected on 10 June 2010, with members being announced on 12 July 2010.

Member	Party	Constituency
Stephen Dorrell MP (Chair)	Conservative	Charnwood
Rosie Cooper MP	Labour	West Lancashire
Nadine Dorries MP	Conservative	Mid Bedfordshire
Andrew George MP	Liberal Democrats	St Ives
Fiona Mactaggart MP	Labour	Slough
Grahame Morris MP	Labour	Easington
Virendra Sharma MP	Labour	Ealing Southall
Chris Skidmore MP	Conservative	Kingswood
David Tredinnick MP	Conservative	Bosworth
Valerie Vaz MP	Labour	Walsall South
Dr Sarah Wollaston MP	Conservative	Totnes

=== Changes 2010-2015 ===
Date	Outgoing Member & Party	Constituency	→	New Member & Party	Constituency	Source
2 November 2010	Fiona Mactaggart MP (Labour)	Slough	→	Yvonne Fovargue MP (Labour)	Makerfield	Hansard
27 June 2011	Nadine Dorries MP (Conservative)	Mid Bedfordshire	→	Dr Dan Poulter MP (Conservative)	Central Suffolk and North Ipswich	Hansard
24 October 2011	Yvonne Fovargue MP (Labour)	Makerfield	→	Barbara Keeley MP (Labour)	Worsley and Eccles South	Hansard
29 October 2012	Dr Dan Poulter MP (Conservative)	Central Suffolk and North Ipswich	→	Andrew Percy MP (Conservative)	Brigg and Goole	Hansard
17 June 2013	Chris Skidmore MP (Conservative)	Kingswood	→	Charlotte Leslie MP (Conservative)	Bristol North West	Hansard
4 June 2014	Stephen Dorrell MP (Chair, Conservative)	Charnwood	→	Vacant		Hansard
4 June 2014	Vacant		→	Dr Sarah Wollaston MP (Chair, Conservative)	Totnes	Hansard
4 June 2014	Dr Sarah Wollaston MP (Conservative)	Totnes	→	Vacant		Hansard
7 July 2014	Vacant		→	Robert Jenrick MP (Chair, Conservative)	Newark	Hansard

== Inquiries ==
The Committee regularly initiates inquiries into government and the policies of DHSC's agencies and public bodies, such as NHS England. The Committees' power to hold an inquiry is a core function of a Departmental Select Committee.

=== 2019 to 2024 ===
- Management of the Coronavirus Outbreak, opened 3 March 2020 (completed)
- Pre-appointment hearing for the role of Chair of NICE, opened 4 March 2020 (completed)
- Social care: funding and workforce, opened 10 March 2020 (completed)
- Delivering Core NHS and Care Services during the Pandemic and Beyond, opened 22 April 2020 (completed)
- Safety of maternity services in England, opened 24 July 2020 (completed)
- Workforce burnout and resilience in the NHS and social care, opened 30 July 2020 (ongoing)
- Coronavirus: lessons learnt, opened 6 October 2020 (ongoing), joint-inquiry with the Science and Technology Committee
- Coronavirus: recent developments, opened 7 January 2021 (ongoing)
- Children and young people's mental health, opened 29 January 2021 (ongoing)
- Treatment of autistic people and individuals with learning disabilities, opened 3 February 2021 (ongoing)
- Department's White Paper on health and social care, opened 25 February 2021 (ongoing)
- Supporting those with dementia and their carers, opened 12 May 2021 (ongoing)
- Cancer services, opened 6 July 2021 (ongoing)
- General Practice Data for Planning and Research, opened 15 July 2021 (ongoing)
- Clearing the backlog caused by the pandemic, opened 20 July 2021 (ongoing)
- NHS litigation reform, opened 22 September 2021 (ongoing)
- The future of General Practice, opened 15 November 2021
- Workforce: recruitment, training and retention in health and social care, opened 23 November 2021
- The impact of body image on mental and physical health, opened 1 December 2021
- Integrated Care Systems: autonomy and accountability, opened 6 July 2022
- Independent Medicines and Medical Devices Safety (IMMDS) Review follow up one-off session, opened 1 September 2022

=== 2017–2019 ===
- Alcohol minimum unit pricing
- Antimicrobial resistance inquiry
- Availability of Orkambi on the NHS
- Brexit – medicines, medical devices and substances of human origin
- Budget and NHS long-term plan
- Calls for cases of GP visa issues
- Care Quality Commission
- Care Quality Commission's State of Care Report 2018-19
- Child and Adolescent Mental Health Services
- Childhood obesity
- Childhood obesity follow-up 2019
- Dentistry Services
- Drugs policy
- Drugs policy: medicinal cannabis
- First 1000 days of life
- Government’s review of NHS overseas visitor charging
- Harding Review of health and social care workforce
- Impact of a no deal Brexit on health and social care
- Impact of the Brexit withdrawal agreement on health and social care
- Improving air quality
- Integrated care: organisations, partnerships and systems inquiry
- Kark Report
- Long term funding of adult social care
- Long-term Sustainability of the NHS
- Memorandum of understanding on data-sharing
- National Audit Office's Report on Investigation into pre-school vaccination
- NHS Capital
- NHS funding
- NHS Long-term Plan: legislative proposals
- NMC and Furness General Hospital
- Nursing workforce
- Patient safety and gross negligence manslaughter in healthcare
- Pre-Appointment hearing for Chair of National Health Service Improvement
- Pre-Appointment hearing for Chair of NHS England
- Prison healthcare
- Sexual health
- Suicide prevention: follow-up
- Transforming children and young people's mental health provision
- Work of NHS England and NHS Improvement
- Work of the Secretary of State for Health and Social Care

=== 2015–2019 ===
- Appointment of Chair of Food Standards Agency hearing
- Brexit and health and social care
- Care Quality Commission accountability
- Childhood obesity
- Childhood obesity: follow-up
- Children and young people's mental health - role of education inquiry
- Current issues in NHS England inquiry
- Department of Health and NHS finances inquiry
- Establishment and work of NHS Improvement inquiry
- Impact of membership of the EU on health policy in the UK
- Impact of the Spending Review on health and social care
- Improving air quality
- Maternity services
- Meningitis B vaccine
- NHS England current issues
- Planning for winter pressure in accident and emergency departments
- Pre-appointment hearing for CQC Chair
- Pre-appointment hearing: Parliamentary and Health Service Ombudsman
- Primary care
- Professional Standards Authority
- Public health post-2013 - structures, organisation, funding and delivery
- Suicide prevention
- Sustainability and Transformation Plans
- Work of the Secretary of State for Health

=== 2010–2015 ===
- 2013 accountability hearing with Monitor
- 2013 accountability hearing with the Care Quality Commission
- 2013 accountability hearing with the General Medical Council
- 2013 accountability hearing with the Nursing and Midwifery Council
- 2014 accountability hearing with Monitor
- 2014 accountability hearing with the Care Quality Commission
- 2015 accountability hearing with the General Dental Council
- 2015 accountability hearing with the General Medical Council
- 2015 accountability hearing with the Nursing and Midwifery Council
- Accident and emergency services
- Accountability hearing with Monitor (2012)
- Accountability hearing with the Care Quality Commission (2012)
- Accountability hearing with the General Medical Council (2012)
- Accountability hearing with the Nursing and Midwifery Council (2012)
- Annual accountability hearing with Monitor
- Annual accountability hearing with the Care Quality Commission
- Annual accountability hearing with the General Medical Council
- Annual accountability hearing with the Nursing and Midwifery Council
- Care Quality Commission
- Children's and adolescent mental health and CAMHS
- Children's oral health
- Commissioning
- Complaints and Litigation
- Complaints and raising concerns
- Ebola virus
- Education, training and workforce planning
- Emergency services and emergency care
- End of Life Care
- Follow-up inquiry into Commissioning
- Follow-up: Social Care inquiry
- Government's Alcohol Strategy
- Handling of NHS patient data
- Health and Care Professions Council
- Implementation of the Health and Social Care Act 2012
- Integrated Care Pioneers
- Management of long-term conditions
- National Institute for Health and Clinical Excellence (NICE)
- Nursing
- PPIP breast implants and regulation of cosmetic interventions
- Post-legislative scrutiny of the Mental Health Act 2007
- Pre-appointment hearing for Chair of NICE
- Pre-appointment hearing for Chair of the Care Quality Commission
- Pre-appointment hearing for Chair of the Food Standards Agency (FSA)
- Pre-appointment hearing for Chair of the NHS Commissioning Board
- Pre-appointment hearing for the Chair of Monitor
- Professional responsibility of Healthcare practitioners
- Professional Standards Authority work inquiry, Professional Standards Authority evidence
- Public Expenditure
- Public Expenditure 2
- Public expenditure on health and care services
- Public expenditure on health and social care
- Public expenditure on health and social care
- Public Health
- Public Health England
- Report of the Mid Staffordshire NHS Foundation Trust Public Inquiry
- Report of the NHS Future Forum
- Responsibilities of the Secretary of State for Health
- Revalidation of Doctors
- Social Care
- The impact of physical activity and diet on health
- Urgent and Emergency Care
- Work of NHS England
- Work of NICE

== See also ==
- Parliamentary committees of the United Kingdom
