= Angela Knight =

British politician and official

Angela Knight CBE
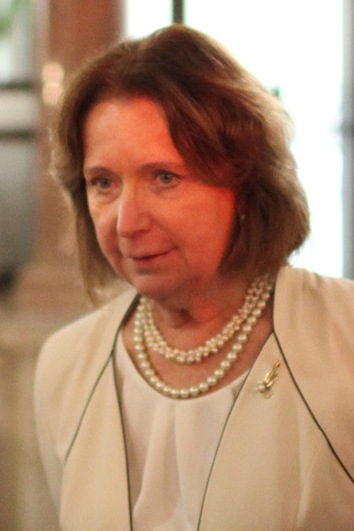
- Knight in 2015

Economic Secretary to the Treasury
- In office 5 July 1995 – 2 May 1997
- Prime Minister: John Major
- Preceded by: Anthony Nelson
- Succeeded by: Helen Liddell

Member of Parliament for Erewash
- In office 9 April 1992 – 8 April 1997
- Preceded by: Peter Rost
- Succeeded by: Liz Blackman

Personal details
- Born: Angela Ann Knight; 31 October 1950 (age 75) Sheffield, England
- Party: Conservative
- Education: University of Bristol

Angela Ann Knight CBE (born Angela Ann Cook, 31 October 1950) is a British politician and official. She served as the chair of the Office of Tax Simplification until 18 March 2019. Prior to this, she was the Chief Executive of Energy UK, the trade association for the energy industry. Earlier, she was the Chief Executive of the British Bankers' Association and, before that, a Conservative Party Member of Parliament representing the constituency of Erewash from 1992 to 1997. She also served as Economic Secretary to the Treasury from 1995 to 1997.

== Early life ==
Born in Sheffield, Knight went to the Penrhos College boarding school in Colwyn Bay, and Sheffield High School.

She then went to the University of Bristol, gaining a BSc in Chemistry, and became an engineer working for Air Products, where she became a Product Development Manager for nitrogen. She went on to set up and serve as Chief Executive of Cook & Knight Metallurgical Processors Ltd, a specialist contract heat treatment company treating precision engineering components.

== Political career ==
She served as a Conservative councillor on Sheffield City Council from 1987 to 1992. In April 1992 she was elected Member of Parliament for Erewash. She was Economic Secretary to the Treasury from 1995 to 1997. She lost her seat in Parliament to Liz Blackman of the Labour Party in 1997.

== Later career ==
Knight became Chief Executive of APCIMS (the Association of Private Client Investment Managers and Stockbrokers) in September 1997. She stayed in this role until 2006. Knight was appointed as a Commander of the Most Excellent Order of the British Empire for services to the financial services industry in the 2007 New Year's honours list.

In April 2007 she became the Chief Executive of the British Bankers' Association. Bloomberg reports that, in a December 2008 statement, she declared that Libor could be trusted as "a reliable benchmark". After a verdict against the BBA at the High Court in April 2011, some BBA members criticized Knight's handling of the case and called for her to step down as Chief Executive. On 1 April 2012 Knight resigned as chief executive of the BBA but said she would remain until a replacement was found. She stepped down in September of that year.

In May 2012 it was announced that Knight had been appointed chief executive of trade body Energy UK, effective the end of July. She stepped down from this position in 2014 to focus on her non-executive portfolio career.

As of 2021, Knight's portfolio of directorships includes Tullett Prebon, Provident Financial, Taylor Wimpey, Arbuthnot Latham & Co and Froggatt Trustee Ltd in the UK, Encore Capital Group in the US, and Astana Financial Services Authority in Kazakhstan. She is also an advisor to Goodacre UK and Oxera Consulting. She has previously served as a non-executive director of Brewin Dolphin, Office of Tax Simplification, Transport for London, Financial Skills Partnership, Scottish Widows, Logica, the Port of London Authority, Lloyds TSB and South East Water.

Parliament of the United Kingdom
Preceded by Peter Rost	Member of Parliament for Erewash; 1992–1997	Succeeded by Liz Blackman
