= Endorsements in the October 2022 Conservative Party leadership election =

This is a list of public endorsements for declared candidates for the October 2022 leadership election for the Conservative Party of the United Kingdom.

== Members of Parliament ==
Endorsements of Conservative MPs Rishi Sunak Boris Johnson Penny Mordaunt No endorsement No Conservative MP

No.	~~Boris Johnson (62)~~	~~Penny Mordaunt (27)~~	Rishi Sunak (197)
1	Paul Bristow	Derek Thomas	Crispin Blunt (Note: Initially endorsed Jeremy Hunt, then switched to Sunak after Hunt ruled himself out of the leadership contest.)
2	~~James Duddridge~~	Bob Seely	Julie Marson
3	Nadine Dorries	Maria Miller	Richard Holden
4	~~Brendan Clarke-Smith~~	John Lamont	Angela Richardson
5	~~Michael Fabricant~~	Damian Collins	Steve Double
6	Stephen McPartland	Andrea Leadsom	Kevin Hollinrake
7	Marco Longhi	Robbie Moore	Jo Gideon
8	Andrea Jenkyns	Kieran Mullan	John Glen
9	~~Andrew Stephenson~~	Craig Tracey	Simon Hart
10	Christopher Chope	Nicola Richards	Andrew Bowie
11	~~Amanda Milling~~	Roger Gale	Anthony Mangnall
12	Shaun Bailey	John Penrose	Dominic Raab
13	Lia Nici	Caroline Dinenage	John Stevenson
14	Karl McCartney	Harriett Baldwin	Gary Streeter
15	Andrew Rosindell	Caroline Ansell	Andrew Murrison
16	David Morris	Lee Anderson (Note: Initially endorsed Boris Johnson, then switched to Mordaunt after Johnson ruled himself out of the leadership contest.)	Craig Williams
17	Holly Mumby-Croft	Heather Wheeler	Paul Maynard
18	Peter Bone	Elliot Colburn	Simon Jupp
19	Jane Hunt	James Davies	James Cartlidge
20	Scott Benton	Neil Hudson	Bim Afolami
21	Mark Eastwood	Mary Robinson	Nick Gibb
22	Jill Mortimer	Marcus Fysh	Maggie Throup
23	~~James Cleverly~~	Tracey Crouch	Alex Chalk
24	Trudy Harrison	Damian Green	Fay Jones
25	Richard Drax	Luke Evans	Edward Timpson
26	Philip Hollobone	Michael Fabricant	Laura Trott
27	Sheryll Murray	Giles Watling	Huw Merriman
28	Jacob Rees-Mogg	~~George Freeman~~	Laura Farris
29	James Grundy		Simon Fell
30	Kelly Tolhurst		Helen Whately
31	~~Shailesh Vara~~		Jonathan Djanogly
32	~~Maria Caulfield~~		Mark Garnier
33	Edward Leigh		Siobhan Baillie
34	Nigel Adams		Rehman Chishti
35	Ian Levy		Damian Hinds
36	Henry Smith		James Morris
37	~~Tom Pursglove~~		Victoria Prentis
38	Mark Pritchard		Guy Opperman
39	Jane Stevenson		Robert Jenrick
40	Gareth Johnson		Robert Goodwill
41	Matthew Offord		Richard Graham
42	~~Jonathan Gullis~~		Mel Stride
43	~~Leo Docherty~~		Robin Walker
44	Ben Wallace		Claire Coutinho
45	Caroline Johnson		Robert Syms
46	~~Simon Clarke~~		Simon Hoare
47	Alok Sharma		Gavin Williamson
48	Antony Higginbotham		Liam Fox
49	Anne-Marie Trevelyan		Simon Baynes
50	Daniel Kawczynski		Bob Neill
51	Joy Morrissey		Anthony Browne
52	Bill Cash		Gareth Davies
53	~~Chris Heaton-Harris~~		James Gray
54	~~John Whittingdale~~		Steve Brine
55	Ben Everitt		David TC Davies
56	~~Priti Patel~~		Mark Harper
57	Greg Smith		Robert Halfon
58	Bob Stewart		George Eustice
59	~~Lee Anderson~~		Ruth Edwards
60	Ben Bradley		Mike Wood
61	Sarah Atherton		Stephen Hammond
62	~~Chris Clarkson~~		Greg Clark
63			Andrew Jones
64			John Baron
65			Julian Sturdy
66			Nigel Mills
67			James Daly
68			Julian Smith
69			Philip Dunne
70			Mark Logan
71			David Rutley
72			Andrew Bridgen
73			James Wild
74			Gillian Keegan
75			Chris Philp
76			Sajid Javid
77			Lucy Frazer
78			Jonathan Lord
79			Johnny Mercer
80			Duncan Baker
81			Steve Barclay
82			Andrew Percy
83			Andrew Mitchell
84			Stephen Crabb
85			Sally-Ann Hart
86			Rebecca Pow
87			Jeremy Quin
88			Jamie Wallis
89			Oliver Dowden
90			Matt Hancock
91			Tom Tugendhat
92			Alan Mak
93			Tobias Ellwood
94			Mark Menzies
95			Miriam Cates
96			Richard Bacon
97			Martin Vickers
98			Caroline Nokes
99			Selaine Saxby
Threshold of 100 MP nominations required to stand
100			Robert Largan
101			David Mundell
102			David Simmonds
103			John Howell
104			Philip Davies
105			Iain Stewart
106			Aaron Bell
107			Paul Howell
108			Helen Grant
109			Chris Grayling
110			Peter Bottomley
111			Flick Drummond
112			Fiona Bruce
113			David Johnston
114			Desmond Swayne
115			Oliver Heald
116			Andrew Selous
117			Greg Hands
118			Paul Beresford
119			Graham Stuart
120			David Davis
121			Kemi Badenoch
122			Alun Cairns
123			Tom Hunt
124			Tim Loughton
125			Paul Holmes
126			Greg Knight
127			Daniel Poulter
128			Justin Tomlinson
129			Andrew Lewer
130			Chris Loder
131			Steve Baker
132			Mike Freer
133			Gagan Mohindra
134			Geoffrey Cox
135			Jesse Norman
136			Grant Shapps
137			Mark Pawsey
138			Theresa Villiers
139			Chloe Smith
140			Matt Vickers
141			Stuart Andrew
142			Peter Gibson
143			Will Quince
144			Michelle Donelan
145			Neil O'Brien
146			Suella Braverman
147			Nus Ghani
148			Michael Tomlinson
149			James Heappey
150			Kevin Foster
151			Jerome Mayhew
152			Felicity Buchan
153			Nadhim Zahawi (Note: Initially endorsed Boris Johnson, then switched to Sunak after Johnson ruled himself out of the leadership contest.)
154			Chris Clarkson
155			David Morris
156			Anna Firth
157			Shailesh Vara
158			Jeremy Hunt
159			Jonathan Gullis
160			Edward Argar
161			Pauline Latham
162			James Duddridge
163			Alex Burghart
164			Leo Docherty
165			James Cleverly
166			Robert Courts
167			Maria Caulfield
168			Scott Mann
169			Priti Patel
170			Michael Gove
171			Louie French
172			Danny Kruger
173			Andrew Stephenson
174			John Whittingdale
175			Mark Spencer
176			Victoria Atkins
177			Robert Buckland
178			Tom Randall
Support of more than half of Conservative MPs
179			Peter Aldous
180			Simon Clarke
181			Gordon Henderson
182			Mims Davies
183			Andrew Griffith
184			Brandon Lewis
185			Jason McCartney
186			Lucy Allan
187			Richard Fuller
188			Virginia Crosbie
189			Jeremy Wright
190			Royston Smith
191			Chris Heaton-Harris
192			Dean Russell
193			Iain Duncan Smith
194			Amanda Milling
195			Tom Pursglove
196			George Freeman (Note: Initially endorsed Penny Mordaunt, then switched to Sunak.)
197			Kate Kniveton

== Peers ==
=== Boris Johnson ===
- The Lord Cruddas, banker and businessman

=== Jeremy Hunt ===
- The Lord Desai, economist

=== Rishi Sunak ===
- The Lord Ashcroft, deputy party chair (2005–2010)
- The Baroness Davidson of Lundin Links, leader of the Scottish Conservatives (2011–2019)
- The Lord Frost, Chief Brexit Negotiator (2019–2020)
- The Lord Hague of Richmond, Foreign Secretary (2010–2014) and party leader (1997–2001)
- The Lord Howard of Lympne, Home Secretary (1993-1997) and party leader (2003-2005)

== Directly-elected mayors ==
=== Boris Johnson ===
- Ben Houchen, Mayor of Tees Valley (2017–present)

== Organisations ==
=== Jeremy Hunt ===
- Bloomberg News

== Individuals ==
=== Penny Mordaunt ===
- Iain Dale, broadcaster (Independent)

=== Rishi Sunak ===
- Piers Morgan, broadcaster
