= John Jackson (South East Derbyshire MP) =

British politician (1919–1976)

Frank Lawson John Jackson OBE (12 June 1919 – 29 March 1976) was a British Conservative politician who served as a Member of Parliament (MP) from 1959 to 1964.

Jackson unsuccessfully contested the Labour-held marginal constituency of South East Derbyshire at the 1955 general election, losing by 1,581 votes to the sitting Labour MP Arthur Champion. At the 1959 general election, he defeated Champion, taking the seat with a majority of only 12 votes.

Jackson did not contest the seat at the 1964 general election, when Trevor Park gained South East Derbyshire for Labour. Jackson never returned to the House of Commons.

Parliament of the United Kingdom
Preceded by Arthur Champion	Member of Parliament for South East Derbyshire; 1959–1964	Succeeded by Trevor Park
