= Peter Rost (politician) =

British politician (1930–2022)

Peter Lewis Rost

Member of Parliament for Erewash South East Derbyshire (1970–1983)
- In office 18 June 1970 – 16 March 1992
- Preceded by: Trevor Park
- Succeeded by: Angela Knight

Personal details
- Born: Otto Ludwig Peter Rosenstiel; 19 September 1930 Berlin, Germany
- Died: 8 September 2022 (aged 91) Fréjus, France
- Party: Conservative
- Spouse: Hilary Mayo
- Children: 4

Peter Lewis Rost (born Otto Ludwig Peter Rosenstiel, 19 September 1930 – 8 September 2022) was a British Conservative politician who served as a member of Parliament (MP) from 1970 to 1992, and was a member of the Energy Select Committee. He was one of the founders of the Anglo German Parliamentary Group, which promoted good relations with the German Parliament. He instigated the annual conferences with German parliamentarians, the first conference being held at his Hertfordshire home.

== Early life ==
Peter Lewis Rost was born as Otto Ludwig Peter Rosenstiel in Berlin on 19 September 1930.

Rost's parents, Friedrich Rosenstiel and Elisabeth Merz, were a mixed-marriage German Jew and Lutheran couple living in Berlin during the Nazi era. Their marriage was annulled and they escaped to the United Kingdom in 1937 before the international border was closed to Jews. Fred Rosenstiel was the economics editor of the Frankfurter Zeitung in Berlin. He later left for New York City, but the family was unable to follow him.

Rost was educated at various schools, finishing in the VIth form at Aylesbury Grammar School and at Birmingham University, where he read geography.

== Career ==
Before entering Parliament, Rost was a stockbroker, lecturer and financial journalist. He unsuccessfully contested the safe Labour constituency of Sunderland North at the 1966 general election, and at the 1970 general election he was elected as MP for the previously Labour-held seat of South East Derbyshire. He held that seat until the constituency was abolished for the 1983 general election, when he was returned to the House of Commons for the new Erewash.

Rost's main interest in Parliament was in energy. He was the longest-serving member of the Energy Select Committee, where he promoted renewable energy. He was an active member of the Combined Heat and Power Association (CHPA), of which he became vice-president. He bemoaned the loss of heat up the cooling towers of the UK power stations, and actively promoted district heating schemes. In the 1970s, he warned of the use of gas for power production, as it was wasting the precious North Sea assets. He retired from Parliament at the 1992 election.

Rost was a member of the Conservative Monday Club and the Bow Group; on the latter, he chaired the energy group. His autobiography, Weimar to Westminster, was published in November 2010.

== Personal life and death ==
In 1961, Rost married Hilary Mayo. He had two sons and two daughters. He lived in Berkhamsted, Hertfordshire, and also had a residence in Montauroux in the French Côte d'Azur. He died in Fréjus, France on 8 September 2022, at the age of 91.

== In popular culture ==
Rost was portrayed by Julian Firth in the 2004 BBC production of The Alan Clark Diaries.

Parliament of the United Kingdom
Preceded by Trevor Park	Member of Parliament for South East Derbyshire; 1970–1983	Constituency abolished
New constituency	Member of Parliament for Erewash; 1983–1992	Succeeded by Angela Knight
