= Arthur Champion, Baron Champion =

British Labour Party politician

The Right Honourable The Lord Champion PC
- Champion in 1959

Deputy Leader of the House of Lords
- In office 21 October 1964 – 7 January 1967
- Prime Minister: Harold Wilson
- Leader: The Earl of Longford
- Preceded by: The Viscount Blakenham
- Succeeded by: The Lord Shackleton

Minister without Portfolio
- In office 21 October 1964 – 7 January 1967
- Prime Minister: Harold Wilson
- Preceded by: Eric Fletcher
- Succeeded by: Douglas Houghton

Parliamentary Secretary to the Ministry of Agriculture and Fisheries
- In office 26 April 1951 – 26 October 1951
- Prime Minister: Clement Attlee
- Preceded by: The Earl of Listowel; George Brown
- Succeeded by: The Lord Carrington; Richard Nugent

Member of the House of Lords Lord Temporal
- In office 11 May 1962 – 2 March 1985; Life Peerage

Member of Parliament for South East Derbyshire (1950-1959) South Derbyshire (1945-1950)
- In office 5 July 1945 – 18 September 1959
- Preceded by: Paul Emrys-Evans
- Succeeded by: John Jackson

Personal details
- Born: 26 July 1897 Glastonbury, England
- Died: 2 March 1985 (aged 87) Pontypridd, Wales
- Party: Labour

Arthur Joseph Champion, Baron Champion PC (26 July 1897 – 2 March 1985), known as Joe Champion, was a British Labour Party politician.

He was born in Glastonbury as the youngest of six children and went on to work on the railways after serving in the First World War. He married Mary Emma (née Williams) in October 1930 and the couple had one daughter, born in December 1931.

He was elected as Member of Parliament (MP) for South Derbyshire at the 1945 general election, defeating the sitting Conservative MP Paul Emrys-Evans to win a majority of nearly 23,000 votes. After boundary changes for the 1950 general election, he was re-elected for the new South East Derbyshire constituency, and held that seat until his defeat at the 1959 general election by only 12 votes.

He was made a life peer on 11 May 1962, as Baron Champion, of Pontypridd in the County of Glamorgan. In January 1967 he was appointed as a Privy Counsellor.

In the last year of Clement Attlee's Labour Government, he served from April to October 1951 as Parliamentary Secretary to the Ministry of Agriculture and Fisheries. After taking his seat in the House of Lords, he was a Minister without Portfolio from 1964 to 1967 in Harold Wilson's government. He died in Pontypridd aged 87.

Parliament of the United Kingdom
Preceded by Paul Emrys-Evans	Member of Parliament for South Derbyshire; 1945–1950	Constituency abolished
New constituency	Member of Parliament for South East Derbyshire; 1950–1959	Succeeded by John Jackson
Political offices
Preceded by George Brown and The Earl of Listowel	Parliamentary Secretary to the Ministry of Agriculture and Fisheries; 1951	Succeeded by The Lord Carrington and Richard Nugent
Preceded by The Viscount Blakenham	Deputy Leader of the House of Lords; 1964–1967	Succeeded by The Lord Shackleton
