= Jessica Lee =

British politician

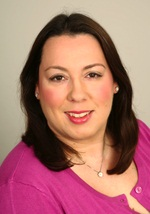

Member of Parliament for Erewash
- In office 6 May 2010 – 30 March 2015
- Preceded by: Liz Blackman
- Succeeded by: Maggie Throup

Personal details
- Born: 7 April 1976 (age 50) Nottingham, England
- Party: Conservative
- Spouse: Richard Harrington
- Education: Royal Holloway, University of London; College of Law
- Website: 1gc.com/barristers/profile/jessica-lee

Jessica Katherine Lee (born 7 April 1976) is a British former Conservative Party politician. She was elected as the Member of Parliament (MP) for the constituency of Erewash in Derbyshire in 2010. She served as Parliamentary Private Secretary to the Attorney General, Dominic Grieve, before stepping down for the 2015 general election.

== Early life ==
Lee was born in Nottingham on 7 April 1976, educated at Loughborough High School and Royal Holloway, University of London, where she graduated with a degree in History & Politics in 1997 and served as Chair of the college's Conservative Students Society. She was the first person from her family to go to university.

Lee went on to study at the College of Law. She was called to the Bar by the Middle Temple in 2000, and practised as a barrister specialising in family law.

At the 2005 general election, Lee stood as a parliamentary candidate for the Conservative Party in Camberwell and Peckham, finishing third with 9.8% of the vote in a constituency won by the incumbent Labour Party MP Harriet Harman.

== Parliamentary career ==
Lee was elected to the House of Commons as MP for Erewash in the 2010 general election with a majority of 2,501. After her victory was confirmed, she said: "I feel privileged, honoured, slightly overwhelmed. I mean it when I say I will do my best to serve everyone in Erewash, whether they voted for me or not". Lee campaigned enthusiastically for the opening of a railway station in Ilkeston, and raised the issue in the House of Commons.

Following the formation of the Cameron Ministry in May 2010, Lee was appointed as the Parliamentary Private Secretary to the Attorney General, Dominic Grieve.

In January 2014, Lee announced her intention to step down at the 2015 general election.

== Family Law career ==
After Parliament, Lee returned to her career at the Bar and joined 1GC Family law Chambers in 2016.

Lee is a prominent legal practitioner specialising in family law with a focus on child-related matters across both private and public law domains. Her extensive experience spans complex cases involving serious injury allegations, intricate medical evidence, and cases concerning fabricated or induced illness (FII). She represents a broad spectrum of clients, including local authorities, children’s guardians, and parents, demonstrating particular expertise in supporting individuals with significant vulnerabilities. Her practice frequently brings her before the High Court, and she has successfully appeared in the Court of Appeal on multiple occasions, contributing to significant case law development in public law matters.

In the realm of private family law, Lee handles a wide range of cases, including child arrangement disputes, surrogacy matters, and high-conflict situations involving allegations of domestic abuse and coercive control. Notably, she played a pivotal role as counsel in two landmark Court of Appeal decisions that redefined domestic abuse and clarified the approach of family courts to related applications. Her international expertise includes representing clients in High Court proceedings concerning international child abduction and Wardship cases.

Beyond her courtroom advocacy, Lee has undertaken advisory work on family law reform for a foreign government, highlighting her broader influence in shaping legal frameworks.

In addition to her child law specialisation, she is actively involved in financial remedy cases, with a keen interest in pre-nuptial and post-nuptial agreements, offering strategic guidance on wealth protection and financial planning within marital contexts.

Lee was elected as Bencher to the Hon Society of the Middle Temple in 2018.

Parliament of the United Kingdom
Preceded by Liz Blackman	Member of Parliament for Erewash; 2010–2015	Succeeded by Maggie Throup
