= Trevor Park =

British lecturer and politician

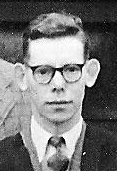

Member of Parliament for South East Derbyshire
- In office 15 October 1964 – 29 May 1970
- Preceded by: John Jackson
- Succeeded by: Peter Rost

Leeds City Councillor for Hunslet Ward
- In office 1980–1986
- Preceded by: Ward created
- Succeeded by: John Gunnell

Leeds City Councillor for Hunslet East & West Ward
- In office 1979–1980
- Preceded by: M. Taylor
- Succeeded by: Ward abolished

Personal details
- Born: Joseph Trevor Park; 12 December 1927
- Died: 6 April 1995 (aged 67)
- Party: Labour
- Education: Bury Grammar School; University of Manchester

Joseph Trevor Park (12 December 1927 – 6 April 1995) was a British lecturer and politician. He was a Labour Party Member of Parliament during Harold Wilson's government in the 1960s, a government which he regarded as unhelpful to the interests of Labour voters.

== Teaching career ==
Park was born in Lancashire, the son of textile workers. He won a scholarship to Bury Grammar School and to Manchester University, and went into teaching in Bacup and Rawtenstall Grammar School on leaving university. From an early age he became interested in politics and made no secret of his desire for a political career.

== Political ambitions ==
At the 1955 general election, Park fought Altrincham and Sale (a safe Conservative seat). His political involvement was unpopular with his employer, and soon after he left to become a lecturer for the Workers Educational Association. This body, which worked with the Trades Unions, looked kindly on members who wanted to be involved in politics.

Park made a strong speech at the Labour Party conference in 1958, which was highly critical of the leadership of Hugh Gaitskell. In the general election the following year, he stood in another safe Conservative seat, this time Darwen. Park's attendance at the Trades Union Congress and successive Labour Party conferences, coupled with his ability to impress with speeches, led to a degree of popularity. Meanwhile, his academic career flourished, with an appointment as a lecturer in the Department for Extramural Studies at the University of Sheffield.

== Elected to Parliament ==
He was selected to fight the constituency of South East Derbyshire, which had the smallest majority in the country (12 votes) going into the 1964 general election. Park duly gained the seat from the Conservatives, by just 873 votes. His maiden speech discarded the usual tradition and attacked the government's policy on nuclear arms.

Park was outspoken on several issues, including British diplomatic support for the Vietnam War and the incomes policy instituted by Wilson. He increased his majority in the 1966 general election. In 1969, he was one of the key figures who backed up those such as James Callaghan, who urged Wilson to drop the proposed Trade Union reforms of "In Place of Strife", a struggle which was successful. Park was a member of the Transport & General Workers Union.

== Post-Parliamentary career ==
Park decided to stand down at the 1970 general election, which other Labour MPs thought was because he knew defeat was inevitable; his seat indeed fell to the Conservatives. Park returned to working for the Worker's Educational Association, and from 1972 he became Lecturer in Industrial Relations in the Department of Adult Education and Extramural Studies at Leeds University. He was promoted to Senior Fellow in 1983. Park also did a great deal of work with the National Union of Mineworkers.

== Attempts to return ==
Regretting his decision to step down in 1970, Park attempted to be selected again for Labour held seats. However, his decision to step down rather than "face the music" counted against him, and he had antagonised the local TGWU organiser. He was not selected for Goole when a vacancy arose in 1971, nor for Batley and Morley after the retirement of the ailing Sir Alfred Broughton, nor for Penistone in 1978, all seats where he was thought to have a chance.

== Municipal life ==
In 1979, Park was elected to Leeds City Council, on which he served for seven years. He was Chairman of the Municipal Services Committee from 1980 to 1983, and of Planning and Development from 1983 to 1986. His colleagues' respect for him was shown by his Chairmanship of the Labour Group. Unwell, he stood down in 1986.

Parliament of the United Kingdom
| Preceded by John Jackson | Member of Parliament for South East Derbyshire; 1964–1970 | Succeeded by Peter Rost |
