= Liz Blackman =

British Labour Party politician

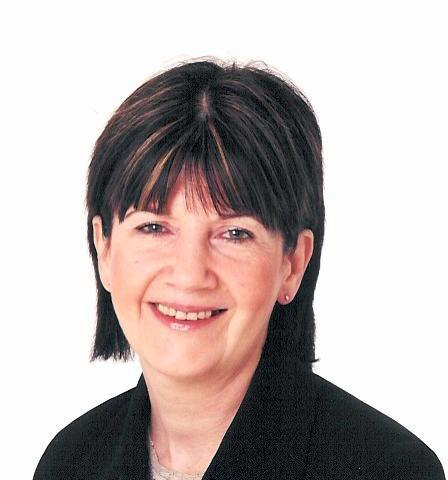

Vice-Chamberlain of the Household
- In office 28 June 2007 – 5 October 2008
- Prime Minister: Gordon Brown
- Preceded by: John Heppell
- Succeeded by: Claire Ward

Member of Parliament for Erewash
- In office 1 May 1997 – 12 April 2010
- Preceded by: Angela Knight
- Succeeded by: Jessica Lee

Personal details
- Born: 26 September 1949 (age 76) Penrith, Cumberland, England
- Party: Labour
- Spouse: Derek Blackman (div.)
- Education: Nottingham Trent University
- Website: Liz Blackman

Elizabeth Marion Blackman (born 26 September 1949) is a British Labour Party politician, who was the Member of Parliament (MP) for Erewash from 1997 to 2010. She served as a Government Whip from 2007 to 2008.

== Early life ==
Blackman was born in 1949 in Penrith, England. She was educated at the Carlisle and County School for Girls (now called Richard Rose Central Academy); Prince Henry's Grammar School in Otley; and Clifton College, Nottingham, where she was awarded a BEd degree in 1972.

She taught history at Bramcote Park Comprehensive School, an upper school, in Nottingham, and in 1991 she was elected as a councillor to Broxtowe Borough Council, and became its deputy leader in 1995 until her election to Westminster in 1997. She stood down from the council in 1998.

== Parliamentary career ==
Blackman was selected to stand for election for Labour through an all-women shortlist. Blackman was elected as the Labour MP for Erewash at the 1997 General Election, defeating the Conservative Angela Knight. She began her progress up the political ladder when she was nominated to the Treasury Select committee in 1997, replacing Diane Abbott. In 2000 she became the Parliamentary Private Secretary (PPS) to Defence Secretary Geoff Hoon. She remained Hoon's PPS after the 2005 General Election in his new position as Leader of the House of Commons. She was promoted to Government Whip and Vice-Chamberlain of the Household in 2007 but stood down from the government in 2008.

On 9 January 2010, Blackman announced that she would stand down at the 2010 general election.

== Expenses controversy ==
On 16 May 2009 The Daily Telegraph revealed details of Blackman's expense claims, showing she had made especially large Additional costs allowance claims. The paper revealed that she had gone on shopping sprees at the end of each financial year in order to claim the maximum possible expenses, purchasing items such as a £199 DVD player, £150 on bed linen and £60 on towels. In 2004/5 her claim was £9 below the maximum possible allowable claim of £20,893, and the following year her claim was within just £2 of the limit. Blackman was one of 98 MPs who supported a bill in 2007 to keep their expense details secret.

== Personal life ==
She was formerly married to Derek Blackman; the couple had a son and daughter, but divorced in 1999.

Parliament of the United Kingdom
Preceded by Angela Knight	Member of Parliament for Erewash; 1997–2010	Succeeded by Jessica Lee
Political offices
Preceded by John Heppell	Vice-Chamberlain of the Household; 2007–2008	Succeeded by Claire Ward
