= Maggie Throup =

British Conservative politician, MP for Erewash

Maggie Throup OBE
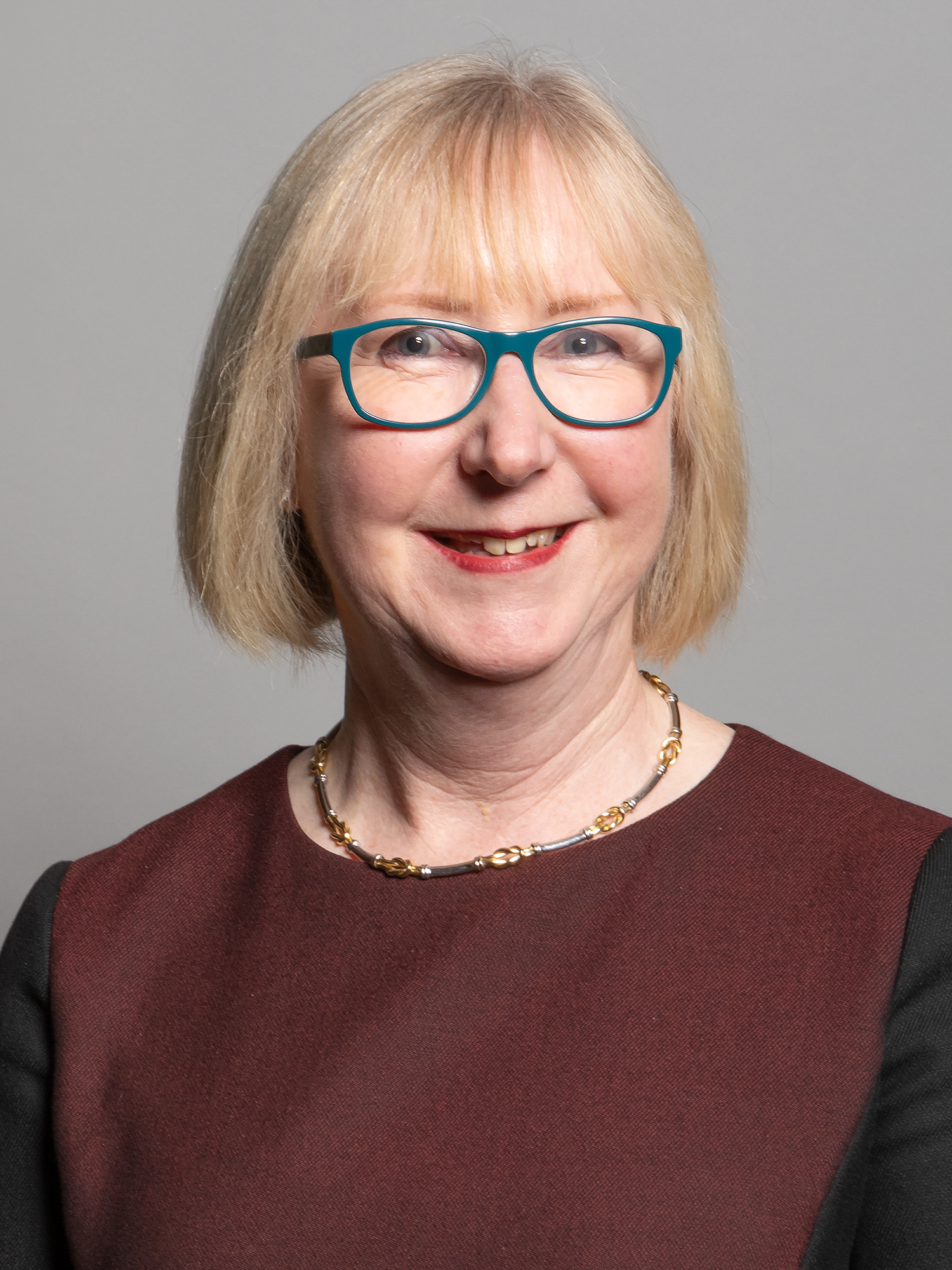
- Official portrait, 2019

Parliamentary Under-Secretary of State for Vaccines and Public Health
- In office 16 September 2021 – 6 September 2022
- Prime Minister: Boris Johnson
- Preceded by: Nadhim Zahawi (Vaccines); Jo Churchill (Public Health)
- Succeeded by: Neil O'Brien

Lord Commissioner of the Treasury
- In office 19 September 2019 – 16 September 2021
- Prime Minister: Boris Johnson
- Preceded by: Alister Jack
- Succeeded by: Amanda Solloway

Member of Parliament for Erewash
- In office 7 May 2015 – 30 May 2024
- Preceded by: Jessica Lee
- Succeeded by: Adam Thompson

Personal details
- Born: 27 January 1957 (age 69) Shipley, West Riding of Yorkshire, England
- Party: Conservative
- Education: University of Manchester
- Website: Official website

Margaret Ann Throup OBE (born 27 January 1957) is a British Conservative Party politician who served as the Member of Parliament (MP) for Erewash in Derbyshire from the 2015 general election to the 2024 general election. Prior to entering politics, Throup worked as a biomedical scientist and business consultant.

Throup was appointed Lord Commissioner of the Treasury in the Chief Whip's office in September 2019, during the first Johnson ministry. On 16 September 2021, during the cabinet reshuffle, she was appointed Parliamentary Under-Secretary of State for Vaccines and Public Health.

== Early life and career ==
Maggie Throup was born on 27 January 1957 in Shipley, West Riding of Yorkshire. Her early education was at the Bradford Girls' Grammar School, which was a private fee-paying school at the time she attended. She graduated from the University of Manchester with a BSc in biology. After graduating she worked as a biomedical scientist at the Calderdale Health Authority for seven years, specialising in haematology. During her time at Calderdale Health Authority, she became a Fellow of the Institute of Biomedical Science. She then pursued a career in marketing and public relations which included a directorship of a pharmaceutical company and running her own consultancy.

== Parliamentary career ==
Throup stood unsuccessfully as the Conservative candidate for Colne Valley in West Yorkshire in the 2005 general election, losing to the Labour party candidate Kali Mountford. She subsequently contested the constituency of Solihull in the 2010 general election, however lost to the Liberal Democrat candidate Lorely Burt.

Throup was subsequently selected as the Conservative candidate for Erewash and was elected as MP for the constituency in the 2015 general election with 20,636 (42.7%) votes and a majority of 3,584. In the 2015–17 parliament, she was part of the Health Select Committee and the Scottish Affairs Committee.

Throup supported remaining within the European Union (EU) in the 2016 EU membership referendum.

She held her seat in the 2017 general election with 25,939 (52.1%) and an increased majority of 4,534. After the election, Throup was re-elected onto the Health Select Committee, but stood down in February 2018. Following the Government reshuffle in January 2018, Throup was appointed Parliamentary Private Secretary to the Ministerial team at The Department for Health and Social Care.

She is the chair of the All-Party Parliamentary Group (APPG) on Obesity, Heart Disease, and the secretary for the APPG on Human Trafficking and Modern Slavery.

In January 2016, a Labour-proposed amendment that would have required private landlords to make their homes "fit for human habitation" was rejected by 312 votes to 219. According to Parliament's register of interests, Throup was one of 72 MPs who voted against the amendment who derived an income from a property. Communities minister Marcus Jones said the Government believed homes should be fit for human habitation but did not want to pass the new law that would explicitly require it.

In May 2016, it was reported that Throup was one of a number of Conservative MPs being investigated by police for allegedly spending more than the legal limit on constituency election campaign expenses. In May 2017, the Crown Prosecution Service said that while there was evidence of inaccurate spending returns, it did not "meet the test" for further action.

In September 2017, it was reported in the Derby Telegraph that Throup had claimed expenses on first class tickets when she travelled by rail, despite official guidance from parliamentary watchdog IPSA – set up in the wake of the 2009 expenses scandal – saying politicians should "consider value for money" when booking tickets. She said that her claims were permissible within the expenses rules and that the first class tickets were cheaper than some standard class tickets available.

In September 2019, she was appointed a Lord Commissioner of the Treasury, making her a government whip.

Throup was re-elected in the 2019 general election, with an increased majority of 10,606 votes.

Throup was appointed Officer of the Order of the British Empire (OBE) in the 2024 New Year Honours for political and public service.

She lost her seat to Adam Thompson at the 2024 election.

== Ministerial career ==
In September 2021, Throup was appointed as the newly-integrated Parliamentary Under-Secretary of State for Vaccines and Public Health, replacing both Jo Churchill (as Parliamentary Under-Secretary of State for Prevention, Public Health and Primary Care) and Nadhim Zahawi (as Parliamentary Under-Secretary of State for COVID-19 Vaccine Deployment) during the cabinet reshuffle. Throup rejoined the back benches on 8 September 2022, when Liz Truss appointed a new ministerial team after becoming prime minister.

Parliament of the United Kingdom
Preceded by Jessica Lee	Member of Parliament for Erewash; 2015–2024	Succeeded by Adam Thompson
