= Erewash (constituency) =

UK Parliament constituency (since 1983)

Coordinates: 52.90°N 1.32°W

- County constituency for the House of Commons
- Interactive map of boundaries since 2010
- Location within the East Midlands
- County: Derbyshire
- Electorate: 71,986 (March 2020)
- Major settlements: Long Eaton, Ilkeston, Kirk Hallam, Sandiacre

Current constituency
- Created: 1983
- Member of Parliament: Adam Thompson (Labour)
- Seats: One
- Created from: Derbyshire South East and Ilkeston

Erewash (/ˈɛrəwɒʃ/) is a constituency (Note: A county constituency (for the purposes of election expenses and type of returning officer)) in Derbyshire represented in the House of Commons of the UK Parliament since 2024 by Adam Thompson of Labour. (Note: As with all constituencies, Erewash elects one Member of Parliament (MP) by the first past the post system of election at least every five years.)

== Constituency profile ==
Erewash is a constituency located in Derbyshire. It covers most of the borough of the same name, which takes its name from the river that forms its eastern boundary. The largest town in the constituency is Ilkeston, which has a population of around 41,000. The other towns in the constituency are Sandiacre and Long Eaton. These towns are located on the outskirts of Nottingham and form part of its wider urban area. The area has an industrial heritage; coal mining, ironworking and textile manufacturing were once important industries. Ilkeston has high levels of deprivation whilst Long Eaton is comparatively wealthier. House prices in the constituency are lower than the national average.

In general, residents of Erewash have low levels of education and income and are less likely to work in professional occupations compared to the rest of the country. White people made up 95% of the population at the 2021 census. At the local district council, Ilkeston and Long Eaton are represented by the Labour Party whilst Sandiacre elected Conservatives. At the county council, which held elections more recently, most of Erewash is represented by Reform UK. Voters in the constituency strongly supported leaving the European Union in the 2016 referendum; an estimated 63% voted in favour of Brexit compared to 52% nationwide.

== Boundaries ==
Boundaries of Erewash from 1983 to 2010

1983–1997: The Borough of Erewash wards of Breaston, Cotmanhay, Dale Abbey, Derby Road East, Derby Road West, Draycott, Ilkeston Central, Ilkeston North, Ilkeston South, Kirk Hallam North, Kirk Hallam South, Long Eaton Central, Nottingham Road, Ockbrook and Borrowash, Old Park, Sandiacre North, Sandiacre South, Sawley, Victoria, West Hallam, and Wilsthorpe.

1997–2010: The Borough of Erewash wards of Abbotsford, Breaston, Cotmanhay, Dale Abbey, Derby Road East, Derby Road West, Draycott, Ilkeston Central, Ilkeston North, Ilkeston South, Kirk Hallam North, Kirk Hallam South, Long Eaton Central, Nottingham Road, Ockbrook and Borrowash, Old Park, Sandiacre North, Sandiacre South, Sawley, Victoria, West Hallam, and Wilsthorpe.

2010–2015: The Borough of Erewash wards of Abbotsford, Breaston, Cotmanhay, Derby Road East, Derby Road West, Draycott, Hallam Fields, Ilkeston Central, Ilkeston North, Kirk Hallam, Little Hallam, Long Eaton Central, Nottingham Road, Old Park, Sandiacre North, Sandiacre South, Sawley, and Wilsthorpe.

Further to their review of parliamentary representation in Derbyshire which became effective for the 2010 general election, the Boundary Commission for England created a Mid Derbyshire constituency. This took electoral wards from the existing Erewash seat, as well as making some minor alterations in neighbouring constituencies.

2015–present: Further to a local government boundary review which became effective in May 2015, the constituency now comprises the following wards of the Borough of Erewash:

- Awsworth Road; Breaston; Cotmanhay; Derby Road East; Derby Road West; Draycott & Risley; Hallam Fields; Kirk Hallam & Stanton-by-Dale; Larklands; Little Hallam; Long Eaton Central; Nottingham Road; Sandiacre; Sawley; Shipley View; Wilsthorpe.

The boundaries were unchanged by the 2023 review of Westminster constituencies.

== Members of Parliament ==
Derbyshire South East and Ilkeston prior to 1983

Election	Member	Party
1983	Peter Rost	Conservative
1992	Angela Knight	Conservative
1997	Liz Blackman	Labour
2010	Jessica Lee	Conservative
2015	Maggie Throup	Conservative
2024	Adam Thompson	Labour

== Elections ==
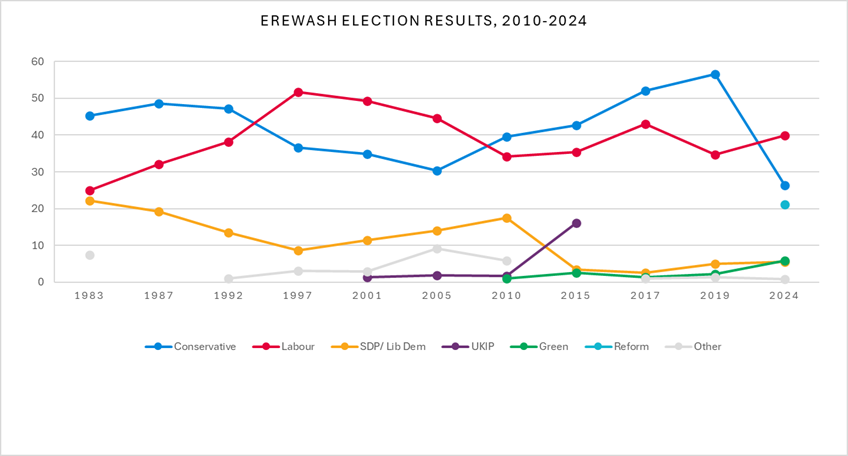
Erewash election results 1983-2024

=== Elections in the 2020s ===
General election 2024: Erewash
Party	Candidate	Votes	%	±%
Labour	Adam Thompson	17,224	39.9	+5.4
Conservative	Maggie Throup	11,365	26.3	−30.1
Reform	Liam Booth-Isherwood (withdrawn)	9,162	21.2	new
Green	Brent Poland	2,478	5.8	+3.5
Liberal Democrats	James Archer	2,426	5.6	+0.5
Independent	John Kirby	351	0.8	N/A
Majority		5,859	13.6	N/A
Turnout		43,006	60.2	−7.6
Registered electors		71,497		
Labour gain from Conservative		Swing	+17.7	

On 30 June 2024, Liam Booth-Isherwood disowned the Reform UK party and endorsed the Conservatives, following what he described as "reports of widespread racism and sexism" within Reform UK.

=== Elections in the 2010s ===
General election 2019: Erewash
Party	Candidate	Votes	%	±%
Conservative	Maggie Throup	27,560	56.5	+4.4
Labour	Catherine Atkinson	16,954	34.7	−8.3
Liberal Democrats	James Archer	2,487	5.1	+2.6
Green	Brent Poland	1,115	2.3	+0.9
Independent	Des Ball	388	0.8	New
Independent	Richard Shaw	188	0.4	New
Independent	Roy Dunn	122	0.2	−0.8
Majority		10,606	21.8	+12.7
Turnout		48,814	67.3	−0.9
Conservative hold		Swing	+6.4	

General election 2017: Erewash
Party	Candidate	Votes	%	±%
Conservative	Maggie Throup	25,939	52.1	+9.4
Labour	Catherine Atkinson	21,405	43.0	+7.7
Liberal Democrats	Martin Garnett	1,243	2.5	−0.9
Green	Ralph Hierons	675	1.4	−1.1
Independent	Roy Dunn	519	1.0	New
Majority		4,534	9.1	+1.7
Turnout		49,781	68.2	+1.0
Conservative hold		Swing	+0.9	

General election 2015: Erewash
Party	Candidate	Votes	%	±%
Conservative	Maggie Throup	20,636	42.7	+3.2
Labour	Catherine Atkinson	17,052	35.3	+1.1
UKIP	Philip Rose	7,792	16.1	+14.3
Liberal Democrats	Martin Garnett	1,658	3.4	−14.1
Green	Ralph Hierons	1,184	2.5	+1.4
Majority		3,584	7.4	+2.1
Turnout		48,322	67.2	−1.2
Conservative hold		Swing	+2.2	

General election 2010: Erewash
Party	Candidate	Votes	%	±%
Conservative	Jessica Lee	18,805	39.5	+10.4
Labour	Cheryl Pidgeon	16,304	34.2	−10.5
Liberal Democrats	Martin Garnett	8,343	17.5	+4.0
BNP	Mark Bailey	2,337	4.9	+2.3
UKIP	Jodie Sutton	855	1.8	−0.1
Green	Lee Fletcher	534	1.1	New
Independent	Luke Wilkins	464	1.0	New
Majority		2,501	5.3	N/A
Turnout		47,642	68.4	+5.8
Conservative gain from Labour		Swing	−9.4	

=== Elections in the 2000s ===
General election 2005: Erewash
Party	Candidate	Votes	%	±%
Labour	Liz Blackman	22,472	44.5	−4.7
Conservative	David Simmonds	15,388	30.4	−4.5
Liberal Democrats	Martin Garnett	7,073	14.0	+2.5
Veritas	Robert Kilroy-Silk	2,957	5.8	New
BNP	Sadie Graham	1,319	2.6	+1.4
UKIP	Geoffrey Kingscott	941	1.9	+0.5
Monster Raving Loony	Jon "R. U. Seerius" Brewer	287	0.6	−0.3
Church of the Militant Elvis	David Bishop	116	0.2	New
Majority		7,084	14.1	−0.2
Turnout		50,553	64.5	+2.6
Labour hold		Swing	−0.1	

General election 2001: Erewash
Party	Candidate	Votes	%	±%
Labour	Liz Blackman	23,915	49.2	−2.5
Conservative	Gregor MacGregor	16,983	34.9	−1.7
Liberal Democrats	Martin Garnett	5,586	11.5	+2.9
UKIP	Louise Smith	692	1.4	New
BNP	Steven Belshaw	591	1.2	New
Monster Raving Loony	Jon "R. U. Seerius" Brewer	428	0.9	New
Socialist Labour	Peter Waldock	401	0.8	New
Majority		6,932	14.3	−0.8
Turnout		48,596	61.9	−16.0
Labour hold		Swing	−0.4	

=== Elections in the 1990s ===
General election 1997: Erewash
Party	Candidate	Votes	%	±%
Labour	Liz Blackman	31,196	51.7	+13.5
Conservative	Angela Knight	22,061	36.6	−10.6
Liberal Democrats	Martin Garnett	5,181	8.6	−5.0
Referendum	Stephen Stagg	1,404	2.3	New
Socialist Labour	Matthew Simmons	496	0.8	New
Majority		9,135	15.1	N/A
Turnout		60,338	77.95	−5.8
Labour gain from Conservative		Swing	−12.1	

General election 1992: Erewash
Party	Candidate	Votes	%	±%
Conservative	Angela Knight	29,907	47.2	−1.4
Labour	John Stafford	24,204	38.2	+6.1
Liberal Democrats	Philip Tuck	8,606	13.6	−5.7
BNP	Laurence Johnson	645	1.0	New
Majority		5,703	9.0	−7.5
Turnout		63,362	83.7	+6.3
Conservative hold		Swing	−3.7	

=== Elections in the 1980s ===
General election 1987: Erewash
Party	Candidate	Votes	%	±%
Conservative	Peter Rost	28,775	48.6	+3.3
Labour	Robert Jones	19,021	32.1	+7.1
SDP	Christine Moss	11,442	19.3	−2.9
Majority		9,754	16.5	−3.8
Turnout		59,238	77.4	+1.7
Conservative hold		Swing	−1.9	

General election 1983: Erewash
Party	Candidate	Votes	%	±%
Conservative	Peter Rost	25,167	45.3	
Labour	William Moore	13,848	25.0	
SDP	James Corbett	12,331	22.2	
Independent Labour	William Camm	4,158	7.5	
Majority		11,319	20.3	
Turnout		55,504	75.7	
Conservative win (new seat)				

== See also ==
- Parliamentary constituencies in Derbyshire
