= Pamber Green =

Hamlet in Hampshire, England

Coordinates: 51.3346°N 1.1250°W

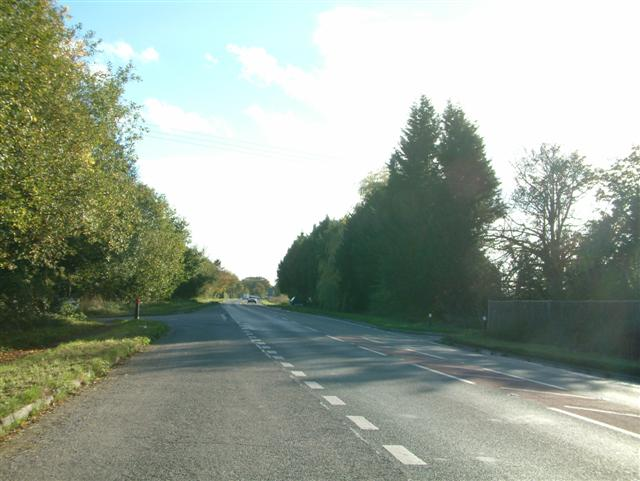
- Pamber Green on the A340 between Tadley and Basingstoke, Hampshire.

- Location within Hampshire
- OS grid reference: SU608598
- District: Basingstoke and Deane
- Shire county: Hampshire
- Region: South East
- Country: England
- Sovereign state: United Kingdom
- Post town: TADLEY
- Postcode district: RG26
- Dialling code: 01256
- Police: Hampshire and Isle of Wight
- Fire: Hampshire and Isle of Wight
- Ambulance: South Central
- UK Parliament: North East Hampshire
- Website: Pamber parish

Pamber Green is a hamlet in north Hampshire, England.

== Governance ==
Pamber Green is part of the parish of Pamber, which covers Pamber Heath, Pamber End, Pamber Green and Little London. The parish council meets in Pamber Heath Memorial Hall and St. Stephen's Hall, Little London.

== Transport ==
The village is served by Stagecoach in Hampshire Basingstoke bus route 2. The nearest railway station is 4 miles (6.4 km) east in Bramley.
