= Little London, Tadley, Hampshire =

Village in Hampshire, England

Coordinates: 51.3301°N 1.1084°W

Little London
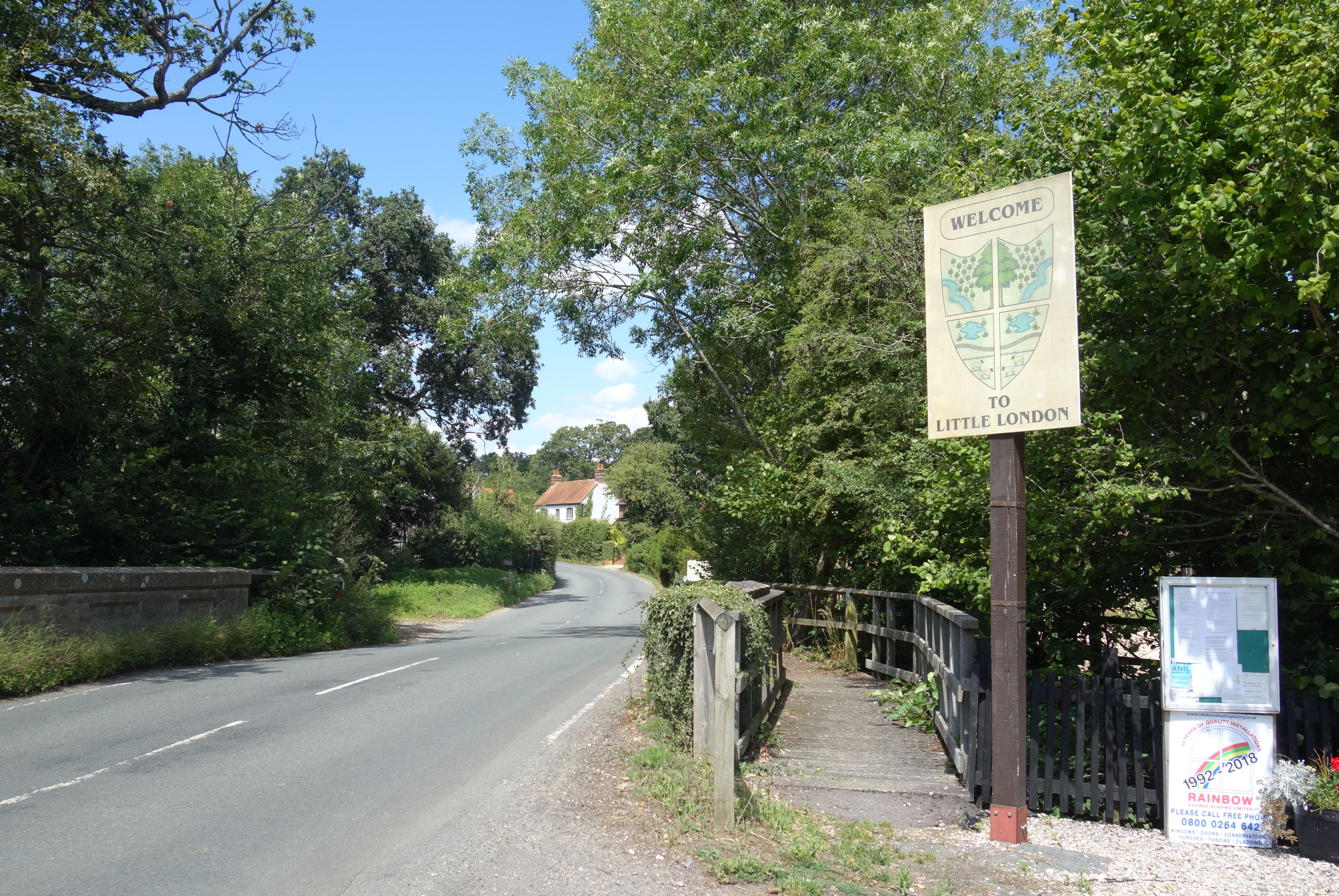
- Welcome sign

- Location within Hampshire
- OS grid reference: SU621594
- District: Basingstoke and Deane
- Shire county: Hampshire
- Region: South East
- Country: England
- Sovereign state: United Kingdom
- Post town: TADLEY
- Postcode district: RG26
- Dialling code: 01256
- Police: Hampshire and Isle of Wight
- Fire: Hampshire and Isle of Wight
- Ambulance: South Central
- UK Parliament: North East Hampshire
- Website: Pamber parish

Little London is a village situated between the North Hampshire Downs and the gravel plains of the Kennet valley, 7 miles (11 km) north of Basingstoke and 15 miles (24 km) south of Reading. It is situated within Pamber civil parish and backs on to Pamber Forest, a 500-acre (2.0 km^{2}) SSSI and remnant of the much larger ancient Royal Forest of Pamber. It is recorded as having been established for at least 400 years.

== History ==
Until the mid 19th century the village was a local centre for brick-making, the local clays being recognised as particularly good since the Roman period. Examples of clay roof tiles produced in this area for the nearby Roman town of Calleva Atrebatum (near modern Silchester) can be seen at Reading Museum.

A major part of the village was confiscated from the Englefield family and given to the Benyon family during the late Tudor period. Other parts were gifted in payment to The Queen's College, Oxford. It is assumed that this was in return for education, although it may not have been. This legacy can be seen by the names of farms, pubs and houses in the area.

The village has grown organically from a few houses, being effectively one street with no social centre to small village of about 120 properties. The village was originally a small hamlet comprising a few farms, two public houses and farm worker's dwellings. In the 19th Century, two brickyards were on either side of the road near The Plough, continuing a tradition dating from Roman times. It is a desirable location, resulting in upper quartile house prices typical of rural Hampshire. The village has one Pub, The Plough, which maintains a very traditional 'English Pub' environment.

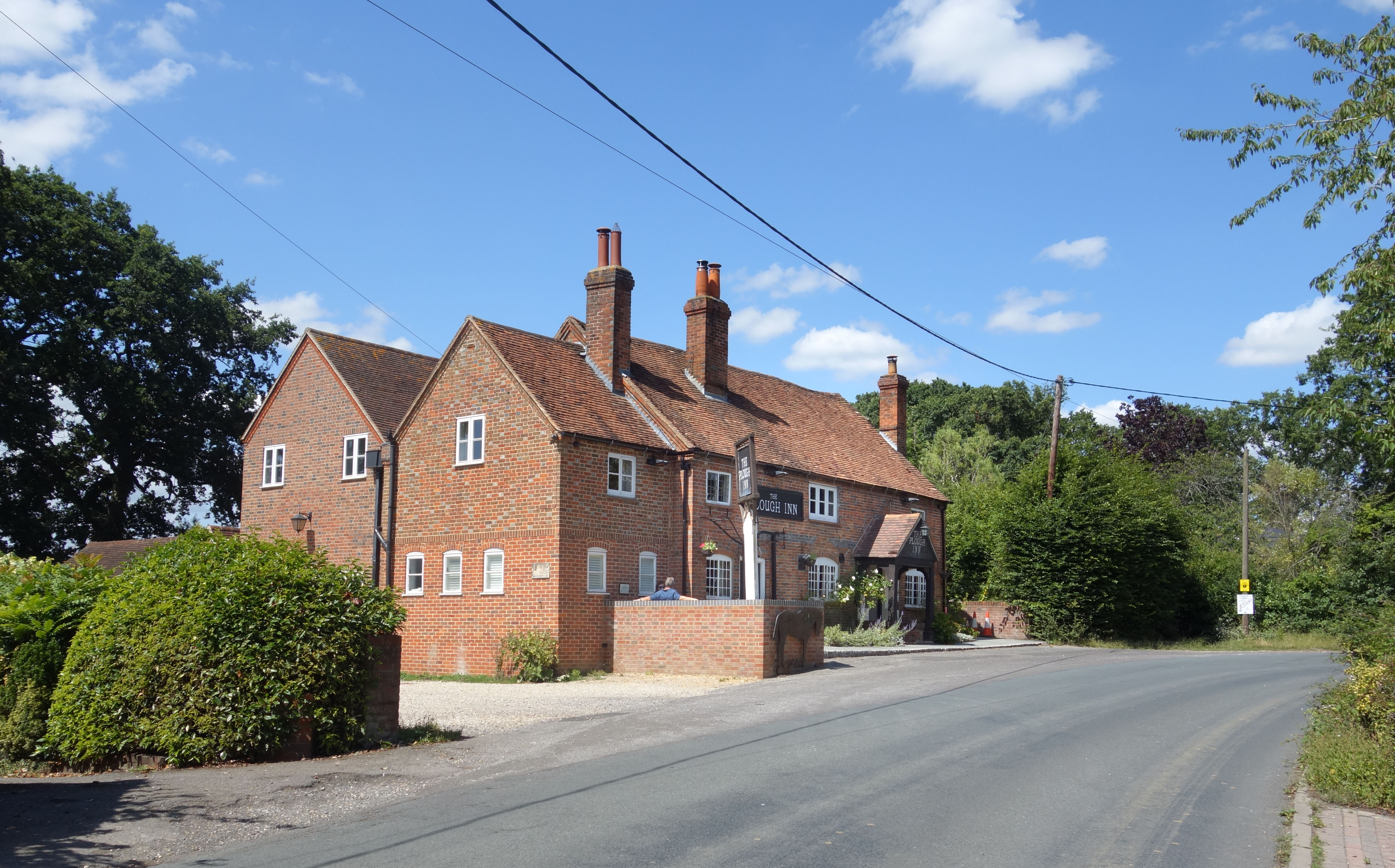
The Plough Inn

'Little London' is a common village name in England, assumed by some to have its origins in the quantity of seasonal Londoners who would camp for the harvest season. However, in common with many 'Little Londons' approximately 50 miles (80 km) or so from London, it has also been claimed that the name was given by settlers escaping the Great Plague of London of 1665. Alternatively, it could have been corrupted from 'Little Loddon', the name of a stream that marks the Southern extent of the village.

Little London at Tadley would have been established by the Welsh cattle drovers in the second half of the 16th century. It was on a main drovers route into London, like that at Oakley in Buckinghamshire. There have been at least 70 communities established in England and Wales, many of which still exist. They were temporary "homes" for the long distance drovers, moving their cattle to London, and the great fairs and markets of England. Tadley was on the route to the fairs of Blackbush, Farnham, Croydon and Kingston, and London's Smithfield market. The sites were established on common land away from other communities. The drovers had a licence to travel, granted by Elizabeth 1st, and were regarded as "foreigners" by the local parishioners who could not travel without a "settlement certificate".

== Governance ==
The village of Little London is part of the civil parish of Pamber, which covers Pamber Heath, Pamber End, Pamber Green and Little London and meets in Pamber Heath Memorial Hall and St. Stephen's Hall, Little London. It is also part of the Pamber and Silchester ward of Basingstoke and Deane borough council. The borough council is a Non-metropolitan district of Hampshire County Council.

== Community facilities ==
The main facility for the community is St. Stephens Hall, Silchester Road.

== Transport ==
The village is served by Stagecoach South bus route 14 to Basingstoke and Tadley. The nearest railway station is Bramley, 3 miles (4.8 km) to the east. Bus 14 sometimes terminates at Berry Court, just nearby.

== Religious sites ==
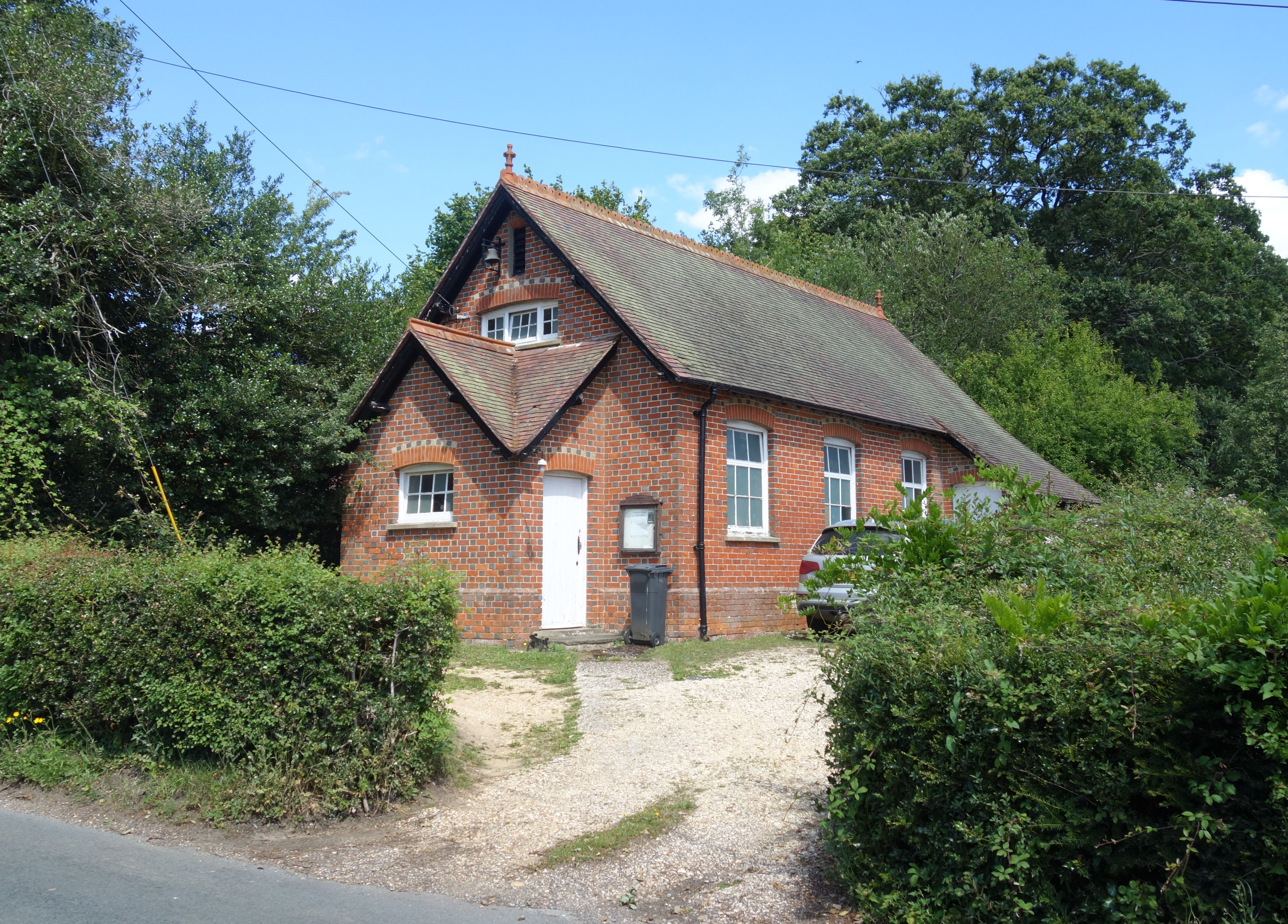
St Stephen's Church

The church of St Stephen on Silchester Road is part of the Deanery of Basingstoke and the Diocese of Winchester and is linked to the parish of Bramley. There was also a Methodist Chapel on Silchester Road, built in 1867 which closed c1980 and was converted to a Bed and breakfast.
