= Bramley Green =

Village in Hampshire, England

Coordinates: 51.3249°N 1.0463°W

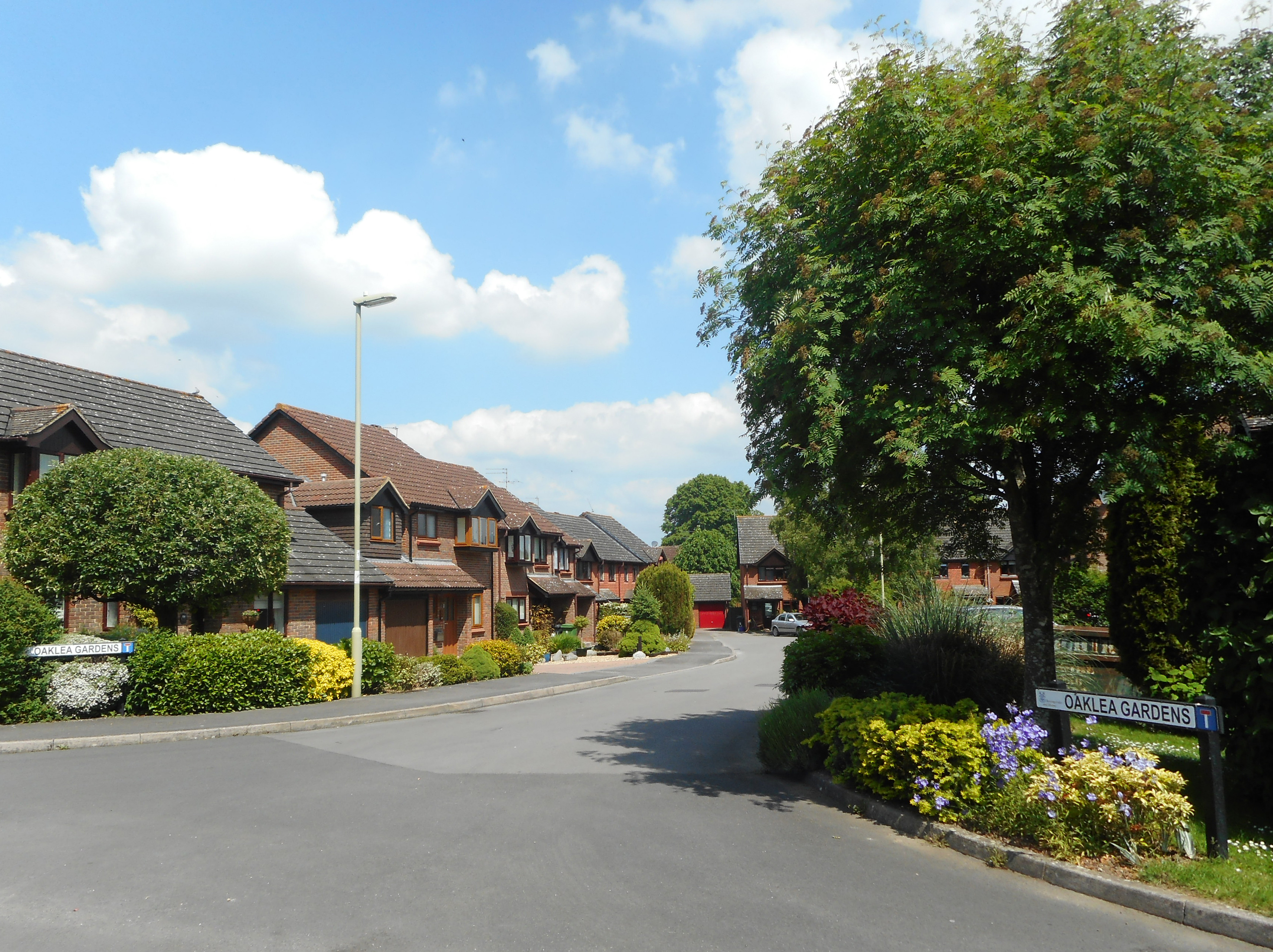
- Oaklea Gardens

- Location within Hampshire
- Population: 34
- OS grid reference: SU665588
- Civil parish: Bramley
- District: Basingstoke and Deane
- Shire county: Hampshire
- Region: South East
- Country: England
- Sovereign state: United Kingdom
- Post town: Tadley
- Postcode district: RG26
- Police: Hampshire and Isle of Wight
- Fire: Hampshire and Isle of Wight
- Ambulance: South Central
- UK Parliament: North East Hampshire

Bramley Green is a small village in the civil parish of Bramley in the Basingstoke and Deane district of Hampshire, England. It lies approximately 4 miles (6.4 km) south-east from the village of Bramley.

South of the village was the Bramley Ordnance Depot, opened in 1917 to manufacture and store ammunition. It was known as Central Ammunition Depot Bramley from 1946. From 1987 it became the Bramley Training Area.

== Governance ==
The village of Bramley Green is part of the civil parish of Bramley. The village is also part of the Bramley and Sherfield ward of Basingstoke and Deane borough council. The borough council is a Non-metropolitan district of Hampshire County Council. All three councils are responsible for different aspects of local government.
