= Bramley Corner =

Village in Hampshire, England

Coordinates: 51.32°N 01.09°W

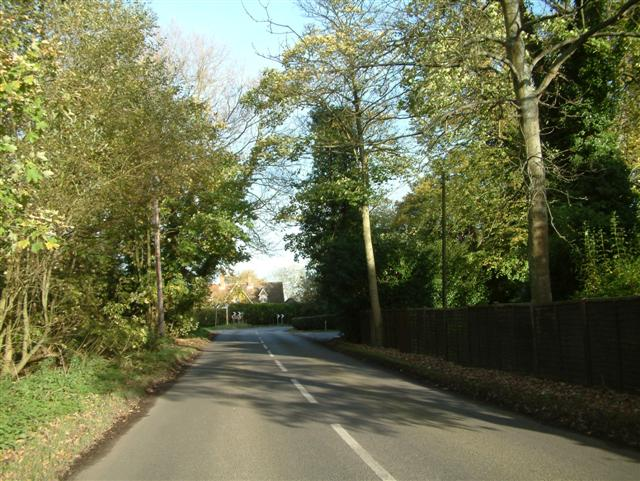
- Pamber End, Bramley Corner

- Location within Hampshire
- OS grid reference: SU6359
- Civil parish: Bramley
- District: Basingstoke and Deane
- Shire county: Hampshire
- Region: South East
- Country: England
- Sovereign state: United Kingdom
- Post town: Tadley
- Postcode district: RG26
- Police: Hampshire and Isle of Wight
- Fire: Hampshire and Isle of Wight
- Ambulance: South Central
- UK Parliament: North East Hampshire

Bramley Corner is a village in Hampshire, England.

== Governance ==
The village of Bramley Corner is part of the civil parish of Bramley. The village is also part of the Bramley and Sherfield ward of Basingstoke and Deane borough council. The borough council is a Non-metropolitan district of Hampshire County Council. All three councils are responsible for different aspects of local government.
