= Ranil Jayawardena =

British Conservative politician (born 1986)

The Right Honourable Sir Ranil Jayawardena
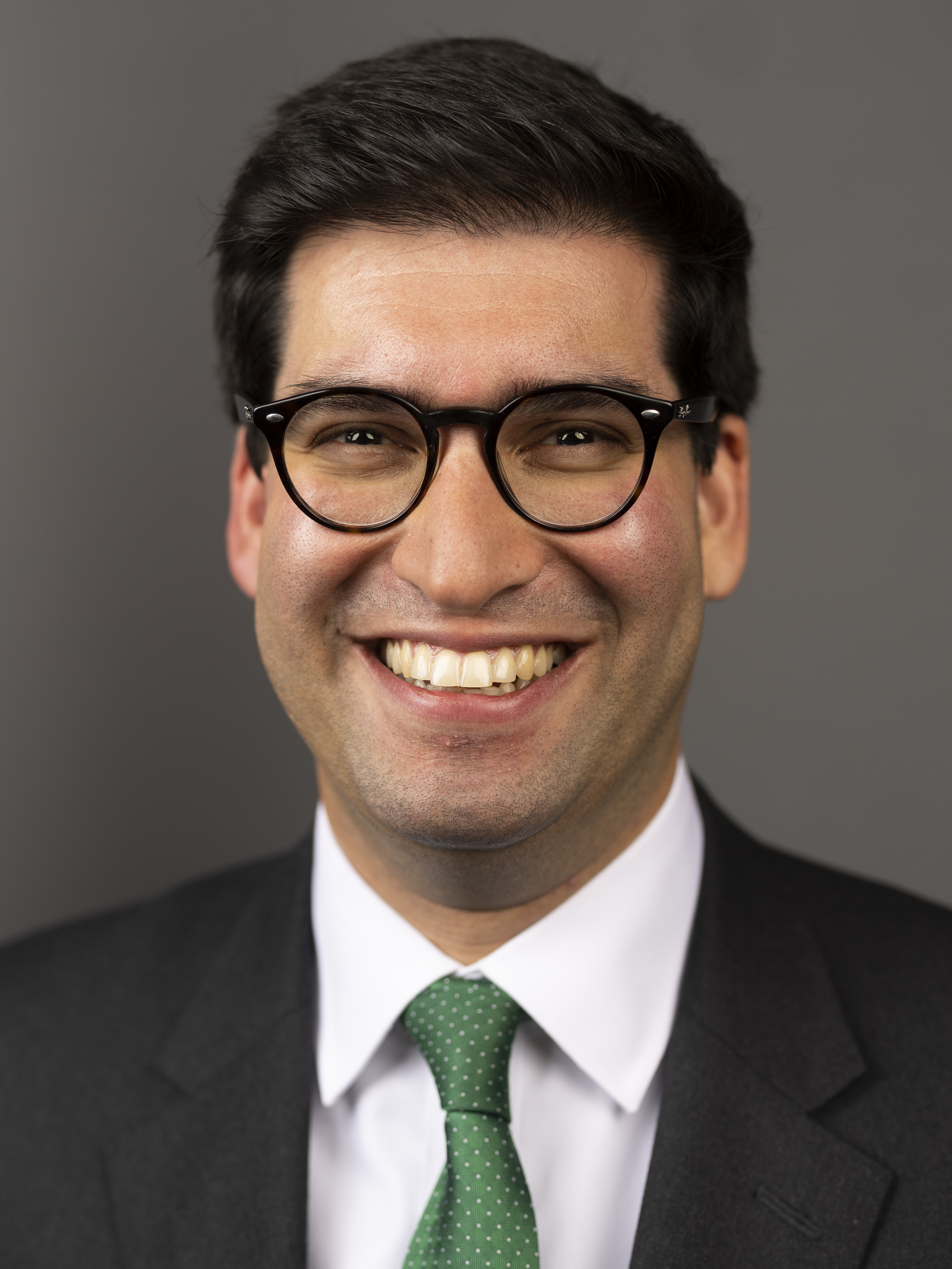
- Official portrait, 2022

Secretary of State for Environment, Food and Rural Affairs
- In office 6 September 2022 – 25 October 2022
- Prime Minister: Liz Truss
- Preceded by: George Eustice
- Succeeded by: Thérèse Coffey

Parliamentary Under-Secretary of State for International Trade
- In office 5 May 2020 – 6 September 2022
- Prime Minister: Boris Johnson
- Preceded by: Office established
- Succeeded by: James Duddridge

Deputy Chairman of the Conservative Party
- In office 13 February 2020 – 5 May 2020
- Leader: Boris Johnson
- Preceded by: Paul Scully
- Succeeded by: Lee Rowley

Member of Parliament for North East Hampshire
- In office 7 May 2015 – 30 May 2024
- Preceded by: James Arbuthnot
- Succeeded by: Alex Brewer

Councillor of the Borough of Basingstoke and Deane
- In office 5 May 2008 – 11 May 2015

Personal details
- Born: Ranil Malcolm Jayawardena; 3 September 1986 (age 39) London, England
- Party: Conservative
- Spouse: Alison Lyn Jayawardena (m. 2011)
- Children: 3
- Education: Robert May's School; Alton College
- Alma mater: London School of Economics (BSc)
- Website: Official website

Sir Ranil Malcolm Jayawardena (born 3 September 1986) is a British Conservative politician who served as the Member of Parliament (MP) for North East Hampshire from 2015 until 2024. He served under Prime Minister Liz Truss as Secretary of State for Environment, Food and Rural Affairs in 2022. He previously served under Prime Minister Boris Johnson as Parliamentary Under-Secretary of State for International Trade from 2020 to 2022.

== Early life and career ==
Ranil Jayawardena was born on 3 September 1986 in London. His father, Nalin Jayawardena, is of Sri Lankan origin and moved to the United Kingdom in 1978 to pursue a career in accountancy. His mother, Indira Das Jayawardena, has Indian heritage; he has a brother and sister.

His early education was at Hook Infant School and Hook Junior School in Hook, Robert May's School, a state comprehensive school in Odiham, and Alton College in Alton. Jayawardena then studied at the London School of Economics, where he graduated with a BSc in government in 2008.

After university, Jayawardena worked for the Lloyds Banking Group and, according to The Guardian, was involved in lobbying Members of the European Parliament on imminent legislation affecting the European banking sector. He also worked on a voluntary basis in the office of North East Hampshire MP James Arbuthnot.

Jayawardena served as a councillor on Basingstoke and Deane Borough Council from 2008 to 2015. During his time as a councillor, he was also the Cabinet Member for Finance and Property, before being made Deputy Leader of the council. He invested in "community safety patrollers" to target anti-social behaviour and littering and provided half an hour free parking in "short stay car parks in Top of the Town".

== Parliamentary career ==
At the 2015 general election, Jayawardena was elected to Parliament as MP for North East Hampshire with 65.9% of the vote and a majority of 29,916. During the election, the candidate for the UK Independence Party was suspended after making a death threat towards Jayawardena.

In his maiden speech, Jayawardena outlined his belief in the rule of law, in human rights and in equality before the law being matched by equality in opportunity, and that rights must be balanced by responsibilities. He set out that "human rights were not conceived in 1998" referencing Britain's long-standing protections for individuals dating back to the Magna Carta, to which his constituency had a connection.

In December 2015, he voted to support Prime Minister David Cameron's plans to carry out airstrikes against ISIL targets in Syria. In the 2015–17 parliament, he was part of the Home Affairs Committee and the International Trade Committee.

Jayawardena supported Brexit in the 2016 Brexit referendum.

Jayawardena in February 2017 publicly continued to support local issues that he had supported as a councillor such as protecting weekly bin collections.

At the snap 2017 general election, Jayawardena was re-elected as MP for North East Hampshire with a decreased vote share of 65.5% and a decreased majority of 27,772. After the election, in June 2017, he shut down his Twitter account after labelling it as "a platform full of trolls, extremists – and worse".

In January 2018, Jayawardena was made Parliamentary Private Secretary to the Department for Work and Pensions. He was made Parliamentary Private Secretary to the Ministry of Justice in September 2018, but resigned from this post in November 2018 in protest at the government's proposed Brexit deal. In March 2019, he sought to protect parental rights to withdraw children from compulsory relationship and sex education in English schools.

Jayawardena supported Boris Johnson in the 2019 leadership election. In the same year, he was appointed as a Vice Chairman of the Conservative Party. At the 2019 general election, Jayawardena was again re-elected with a decreased vote share of 59.5% and a decreased majority of 20,211.

In February 2020, he was appointed Deputy Chairman of the Conservative Party and, in March 2020, he was appointed to the Panel of Chairs in the House of Commons. In May 2020, he was appointed as Minister for International Trade, at the Department for International Trade, by Boris Johnson following the resignation of Conor Burns.

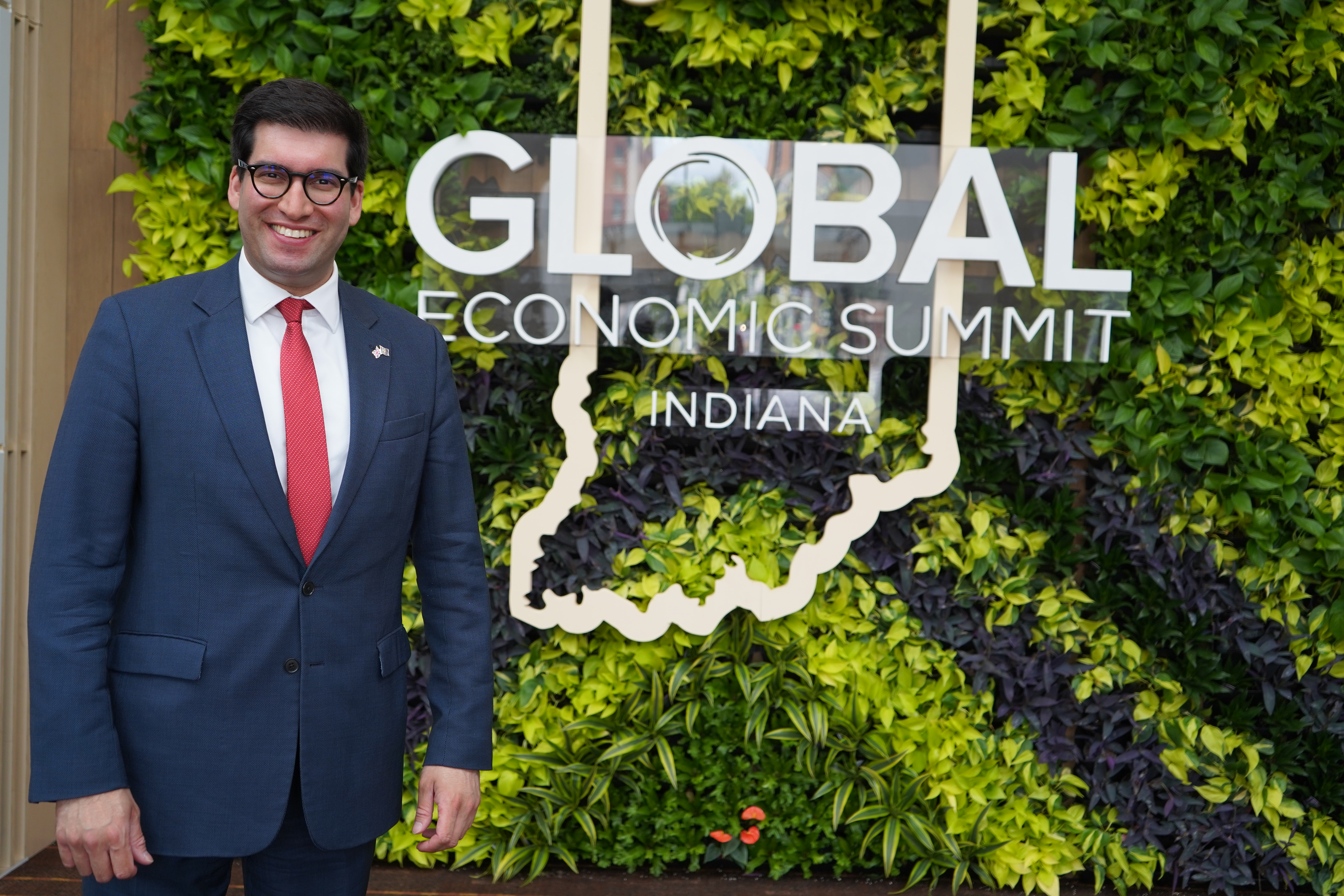
Jayawardena at the Indiana Global Economic Summit in 2022

In November 2020, the Basingstoke Gazette reported that, prior to serving in government, Jayawardena earned £40,000 in share options from eight days consulting for PepTcell, a pharmaceuticals company and £1,400 plus free travel from Great Western Railway. This information was publicly available and fully declared on the Register of Members' Interests.

In September 2022, he was appointed as Secretary of State for Environment, Food and Rural Affairs by Prime Minister Liz Truss. Jayawardena was considered a close ally of Truss having worked together at the Department for International Trade, and was one her earliest supporters during the 2022 leadership election. Farmers Weekly noted at the time that he was "relatively unknown" in agriculture and had no direct experience. He was sworn in as a member of the Privy Council on 13 September 2022 following his appointment.

In the 2024 general election, Jayawardena lost his seat when Liberal Democrat Alex Brewer won the seat by 634 votes.

Jayawardena was knighted in the 2025 New Year Honours for "political and public service".

== Post-parliamentary career ==
Following his defeat at the 2024 UK General Election, Jayawardena has worked as a Senior Advisor at public affairs agency Ringshall.

== Personal life ==
Jayawardena lives in Bramley, Hampshire. He has been married to Alison (née Roberts), a solicitor, since 2011. The couple have two daughters and a son. His wife worked part-time as a senior researcher for his parliamentary office. He is a Christian.

Parliament of the United Kingdom
Preceded by James Arbuthnot	Member of Parliament for North East Hampshire; 2015–2024	Succeeded by Alex Brewer
Political offices
Preceded by George Eustice	Secretary of State for Environment, Food and Rural Affairs; 2022	Succeeded by Thérèse Coffey
