= St James' Church, Bramley =

Church in Bramley, Hampshire, England

St James' Church
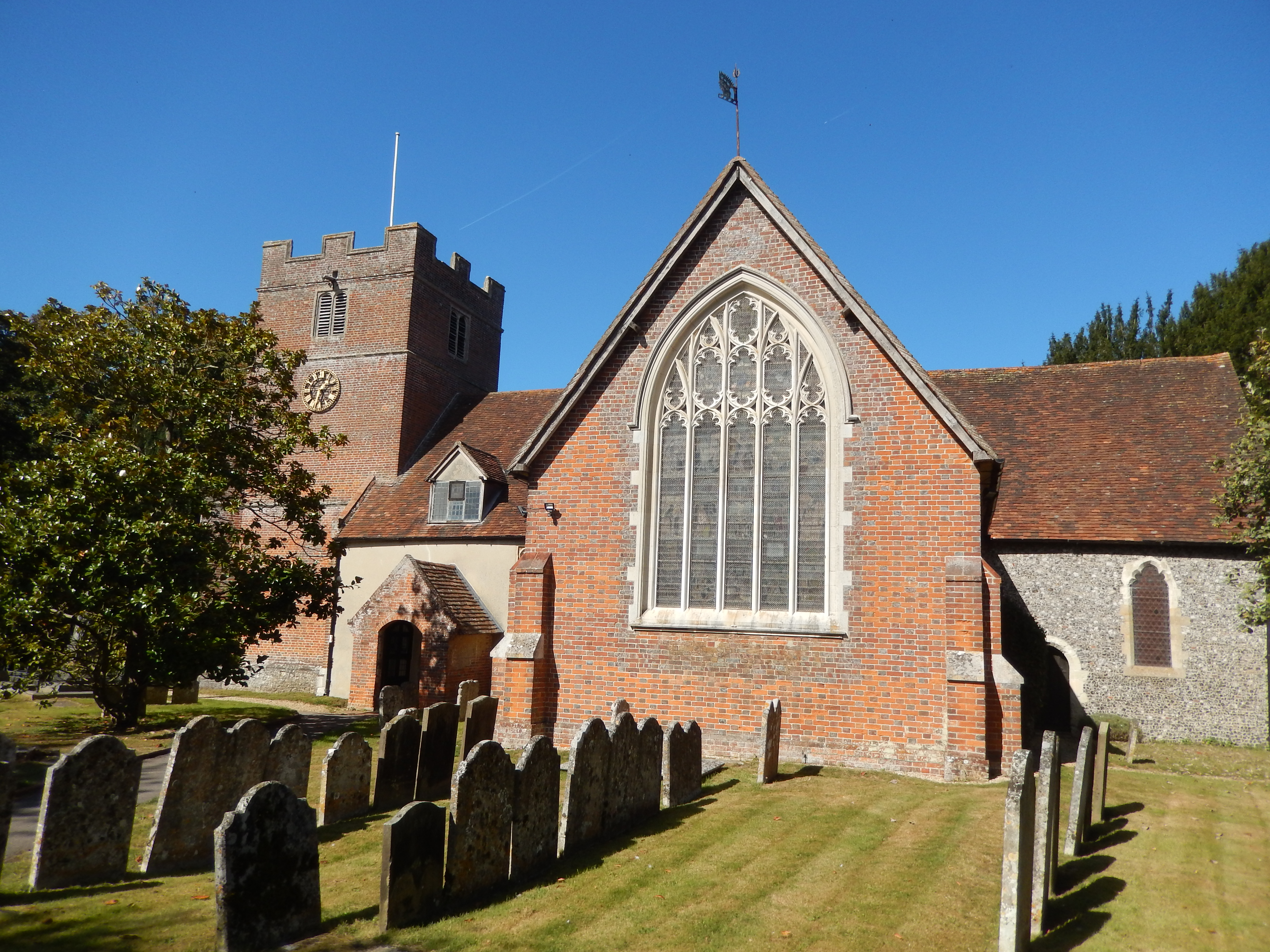

- Location within Hampshire
- 51.3259°N 1.0759°W
- Location: Bramley, Hampshire England

Site notes
- Architectural style: Norman

Listed Building – Grade I
- Official name: Church of St James
- Designated: 26 April 1957
- Reference no.: 1093029

The Church of St James in Bramley, Hampshire, England was built in the Norman period and has been added to since. It is a Grade I listed building.

== History ==
The Norman church had a west tower added in 1636, replacing a previous wooden tower. Part of the nave was added by John Soane in 1802.

The parish is part of the benefice of Sherfield on Loddon, Stratfield Saye and Hartley Wespall with Stratfield Turgis, Bramley and Little London within the Diocese of Winchester.

== Architecture ==
The flint building has stone dressings and a tiled roof. The walls are supported by buttresses. The south porch and three-stage tower are of red brickwork. Some of the windows in the north wall remain from the original Norman structure.

The interior includes a 13th-century piscina while the screen, benches, pulpit and communion rail are from the 16th to 18th centuries.

== Wall paintings ==
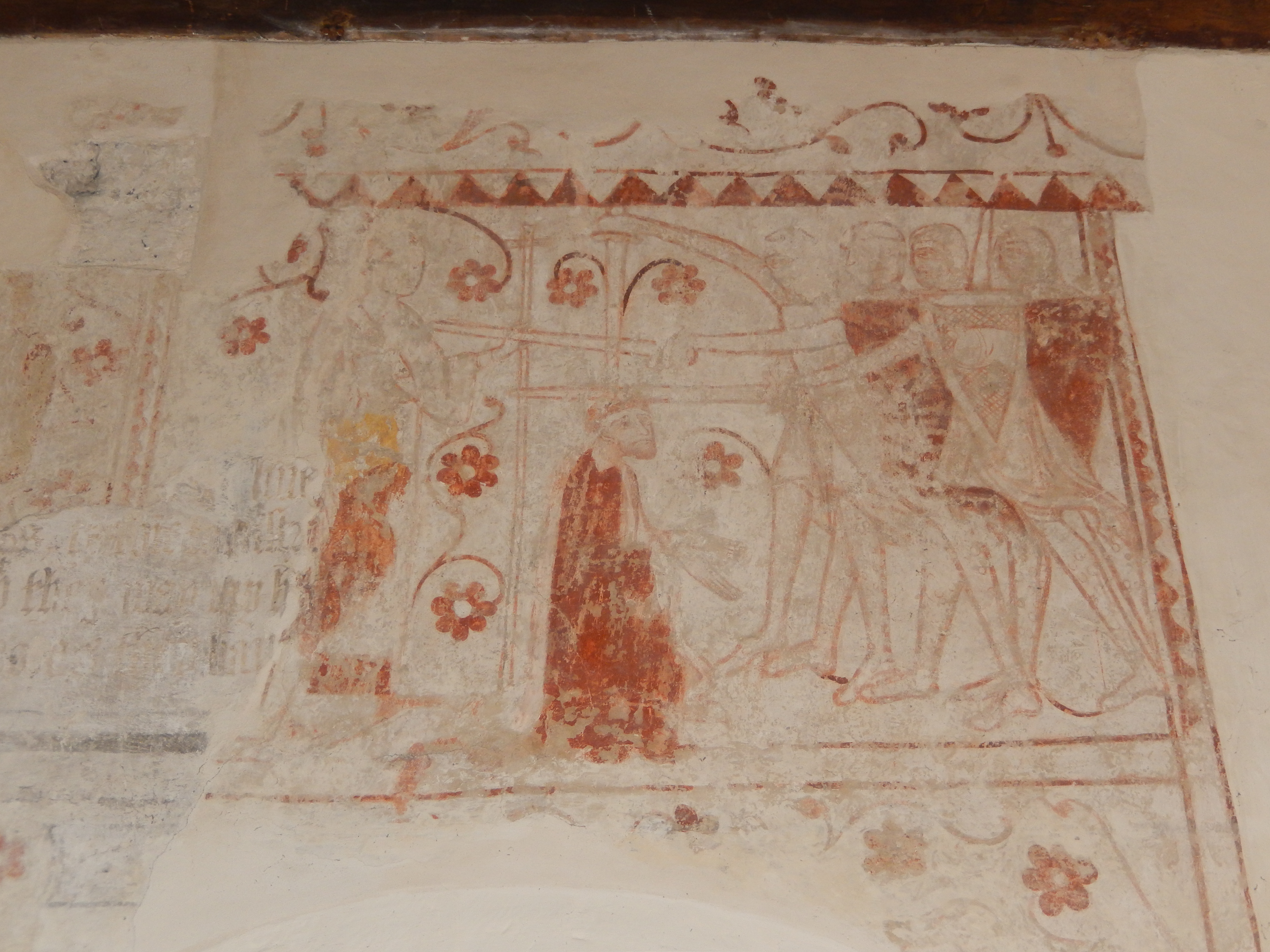
Wall painting on the south wall depicting the martyrdom of Thomas Becket

In the 1870s, Charles Eddy, vicar of the church, uncovered a large number of wall paintings and painted scriptural texts dating to the 13th through 16th centuries which had been whitewashed over in 1550–1551 during the Reformation. The earliest paintings are on the south wall, and depict a series of martyrdoms, the best preserved being a depiction of the murder of Thomas Becket by four knights in 1170. On the north wall is 16th-century depiction of St Christopher which bears a remarkable likeness to contemporary portraits of King Henry VIII. The north wall also has paintings of scriptural texts (John 3:5, Psalm 26 verse 6, and Psalm 95), as well as two consecration crosses. There are also elaborate decorative painted designs in the chancel, around the north and south windows, and on the east wall, with paintings of saints on either side of the east window.

== Brocas Chapel ==
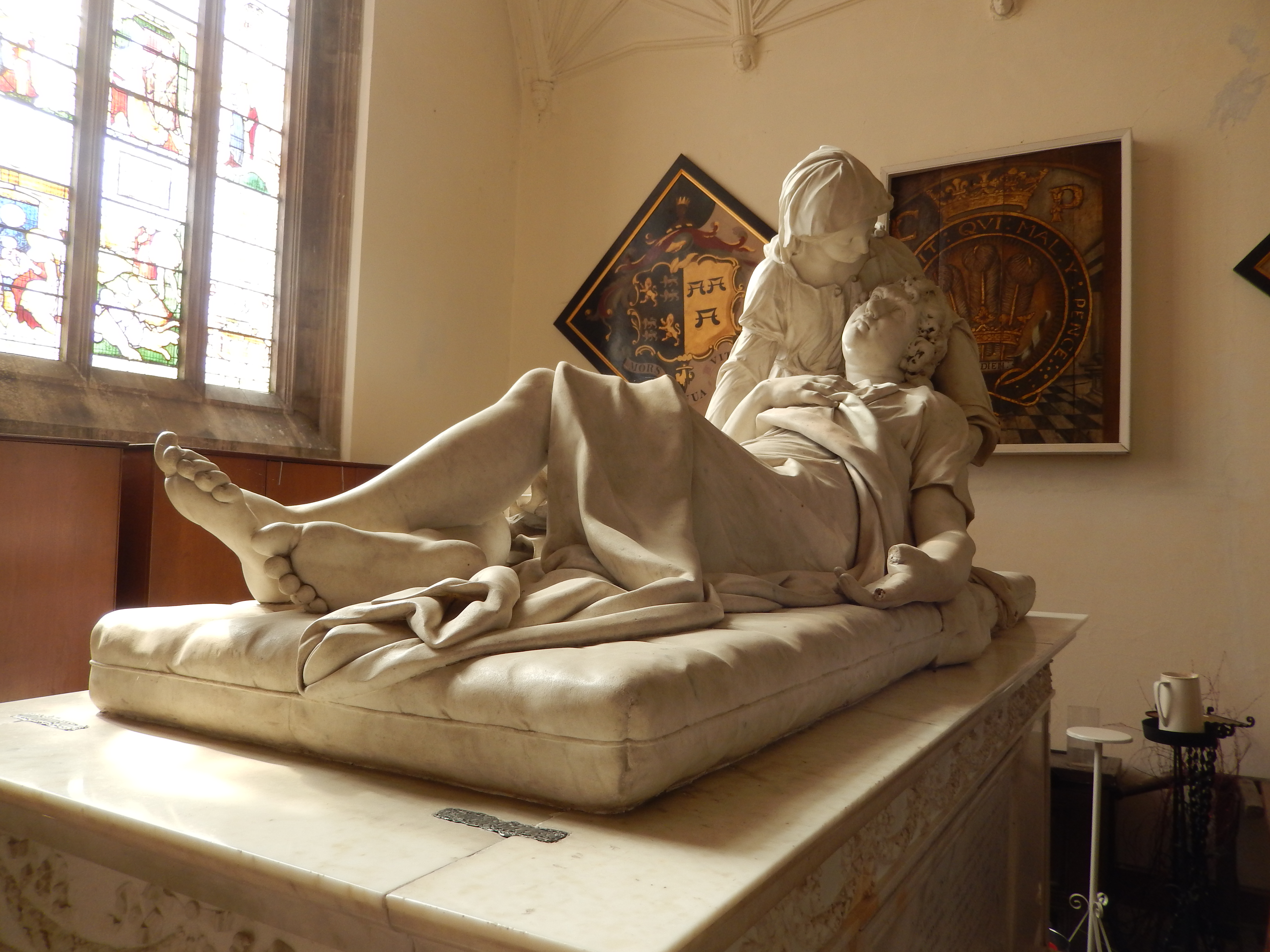
Tomb of Sir Bernard Brocas of Beaurepaire (1730–1777)

The Brocas chapel is an aisle added to the church of St James by the architect John Soane around 1800. This chapel was built to house the tomb of Bernard Brocas of Beaurepaire, which had previously been outside, exposed to the weather. The white marble tomb was the work of John Bacon the Elder. Brocas, who died 8 November 1777, was Lord of Beaurepaire, Hampshire and a magistrate and colonel of the militia. He was a descendant of Bernard Brocas, who was executed in 1400, the son of the MP Bernard Brocas, died 1395, an Anglo-Gascon family of the 13th and 14th centuries.

== Churchyard ==
The physicist Lise Meitner is buried in the burial ground next to the church, near the grave of her brother Walter.

== List of vicars ==
- William de Martene
- Thomas de Bardene (1316)
- William de Godefray (1320)
- John Muleward (1361)
- Sir John Avereye (1372)
- Geoffrey Chaunterell (1388)
- Sir Hugh Thurnham (1388)
- Hugh Plane
- Robert Hemgrave (1391)
- Robert Chirchehous
- Sir William Knavenhurst (1402)
- John Colet (1404)
- Ralph Jorad (1409)
- William Swinton
- John Whitgreve (1431)
- John Ruston (1433)
- Thomas Tuelwebbe (1434)
- Walter Cobenore (1437)
- Sir Thomas Turnour (1451)
- Unnamed vicar (1466)
- Sir Thomas Kynge (1474)
- Sir Richard Chamberlayn (1498)
- Richard Lancaster (1502)
- William Patynson, S.T.P.
- William Knott, A.M. (1522)
- Sir Gregory Bell (1550)
- Sir John Warweke (1562)
- William ap Robert or Edwardes (1563)
- John Richardes (1567)
- Christopher Sexten, B.A. (1593)
- Thomas Sherman, A.M. (1605)
- Thomas Lough, B.D. (1643)
- John Wakefield, A.M. (1666)
- Peter Dalton, M.A. (1673)
- William Pennington (1712)
- Stephen Green, M.A. (1724)
- Thomas Shaw (1742)
- George Fothergill, D.D. (1751)
- George Dixon, D.D. (1761)
- William Dowson, D.D. (1787)
- George Thompson, D.D. (1800)
- Henry Wheatly, A.M. (1823)
- Anthony Grayson, D.D. (1824)
- William Thompson, D.D. (1843)
- William Airey, M.A. (1844)
- Charles Eddy, M.A. (1869)
- Thomas Hayes Belcher, M.A. (1893)
- Herbert Lavallin Puxley, M.A. (1920)
- George Robert Macaulay, M.A. (1925)
- John Wilfrid Greenstreet, M.A. (1936)
- Thomas Boulton Tunstall, M.A., A.C.A (1956)
- Kenneth Harry Houlden (1967)
- Roger Stanton Cossins, B.D., A.K.C. (1976)
- Robert Charles Toogood A.K.C. (1992)
- John Robert Lenton, M.A. (2010)
- Mark Stuart Anderson, B.A. (2022)
