= Parliamentary Under-Secretary of State for International Trade =

Former ministerial office of the Government of the United Kingdom

United Kingdom Minister of State for International Trade
- Royal Arms of His Majesty's Government
- Department for Business and Trade
- Style: Minister
- Nominator: Prime Minister of the United Kingdom
- Appointer: The Monarch; on advice of the Prime Minister
- Term length: At His Majesty's pleasure
- Formation: 2020
- Abolished: 2023
- Website: https://www.gov.uk/government/ministers/parliamentary-under-secretary-of-state--139

The Minister of State for International Trade (Minister for International Trade) was a mid-level position in the Department for Business and Trade of the Government of the United Kingdom. From 2016 to 2023, the minister worked in the Department for International Trade.

== Responsibilities ==
The minister has responsibility of the following policy areas:

- Future free trade agreements
- Trade agreement continuity
- Export controls
- Tackling barriers to market access

He also supports the Secretary of State with:

- Trade remedies
- Trade dialogues
- Joint economic and trade committees

== List of officeholders ==
Under-Secretary	Took office	Left office	Political party	Prime Minister
Ranil Jayawardena; MP for North East Hampshire	5 May 2020	6 September 2022	Conservative	Boris Johnson
James Duddridge; MP for Rochford and Southend East	8 September 2022	26 October 2022	Conservative	Liz Truss
Nigel Huddleston; MP for Mid Worcestershire	30 October 2022	13 November 2023	Conservative	Rishi Sunak
