= Michael Broadbent =

British wine critic (1927–2020)

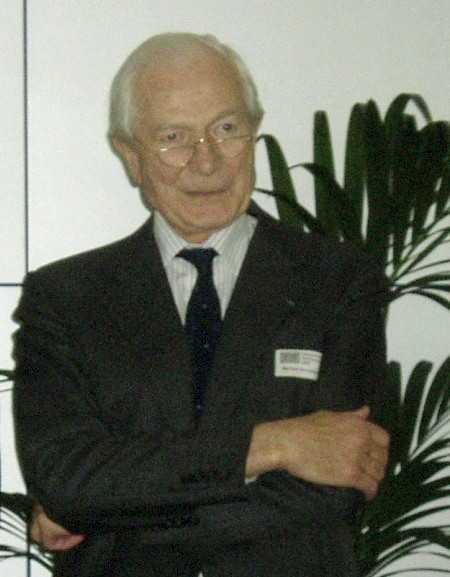
- Michael Broadbent in 2005
- Born: John Michael Broadbent; 2 May 1927; Yorkshire, England
- Died: 17 March 2020 (aged 92); Berkshire, England
- Education: Oundle School
- Occupations: Wine critic, writer
- Spouse(s): Daphne Joste; Valerie Smallwood
- Children: Dame Emma Arbuthnot; Bartholomew Broadbent
- Relatives: Broadbent baronets
- Writing career
- Language: English

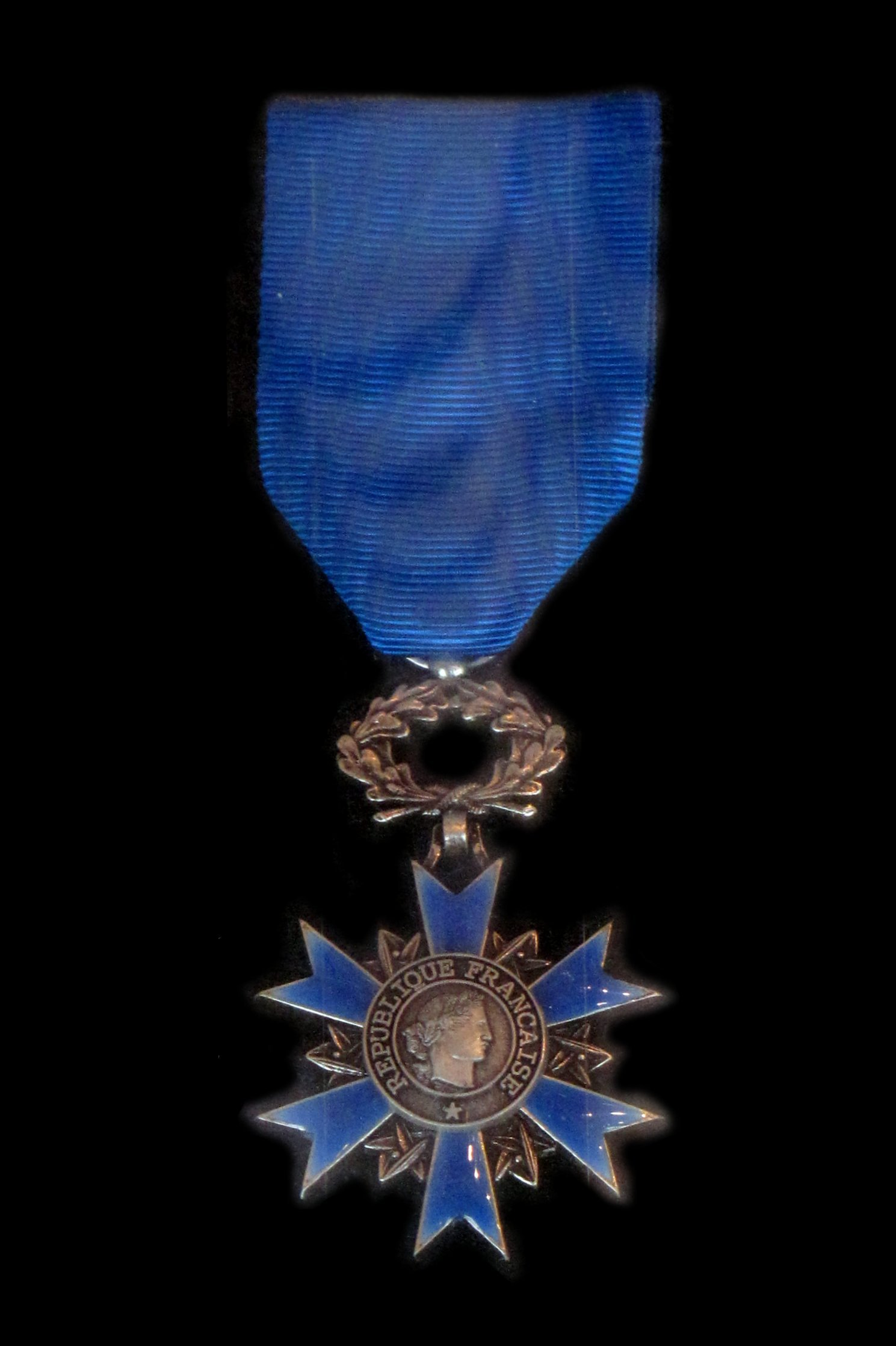
Ordre national du Mérite insignia

John Michael Broadbent, MW (2 May 1927 – 17 March 2020), was a British wine critic, writer and auctioneer in a capacity as a Master of Wine. He was an authority on wine tasting and old wines.

== Career ==
Born in Yorkshire, the elder son of John Broadbent (1891–1963) and Hilary née Batty (1905–1998), he was educated at Oundle School. Commissioned into the Royal Artillery as Second Lieutenant in 1945, he served as Assistant Adjutant at Dover Castle 1947-48, before leaving the Army to train as an architect (ARIBA). In 1952, at the age of twenty-five, Broadbent entered the wine trade first with Layton's, then with the West End wine merchants, Saccone & Speed, and from 1955 with Harvey's of Bristol. In 1960, he received the qualification of Master of Wine.

In 1966, he resigned as Sales Director to start wine auctions at the London auction house Christie's which would lead him to trade in and taste a greater number of fine and rare wines than anyone else in the world. His tasting notes are estimated to number over 90,000 in more than 140 notebooks.

Until 1992, he was the senior director of Christie's wine department, and he remained a senior consultant with the firm until 2009. Journalist Harry Eyres, who worked as a junior expert at Christie's, wrote that Broadbent "created a small niche of glamour for himself as a jet-setting wine celebrity, while everybody else in the office toiled in near Dickensian conditions".

As a wine writer, Broadbent was noted for publications of his records from a life of tasting wine. The Great Vintage Wine Book is a reference work with tasting notes from more than 6,000 wines dating back to the 17th century. In addition to authoring several wine books, he was a regular contributor to the wine magazines Vinum and Falstaff , and wrote monthly for Decanter since its inception in 1975. Broadbent lectured on the subject since the mid-1950s. Broadbent awarded a wine up to five stars, a system unlike the numerical score of the American wine critic Robert Parker.

Appointed a Chevalier of the Ordre national du Mérite in 1979, Broadbent was also a Chevalier du Tastevin and an honorary member of the Académie du Vin de Bordeaux as well as of numerous other French wine associations. Among other positions held, Broadbent served as Chairman of the Institute of Masters of Wine 1970, Master of the Worshipful Company of Distillers 1991/92, President of The International Wine and Food Society 1985–92, President of the Wine & Spirit Education Trust (WSET) 2007–09 and Chairman of The Wine & Spirit Trades' Benevolent Society 1991/92. He also stood for election as Lay Sheriff of the City of London in 1993.

In 2006, he participated as a judge in the 30th anniversary repetition of the original "Judgment of Paris" wine tasting competition.

== Personal life ==
Broadbent was widowed by his first wife, Daphne née Joste (1931–2015), whom he married in 1954:
their daughter, Dame Emma Arbuthnot DBE, known professionally as Mrs Justice Arbuthnot, married the Rt Hon. the Lord Arbuthnot of Edrom, formerly James Arbuthnot, MP, and their son, Bartholomew Broadbent, is a wine importer in the United States who also makes Port, Madeira and Vinho Verde in Portugal and was a 50% owner of Dragon's Hollow winery in China.

Broadbent married secondly in London, on 25 April 2019, Valerie Smallwood, widow of Simon Smallwood, MW, and died on 17 March 2020, in Berkshire, aged 92.

=== Controversy ===
Broadbent was among the wine industry experts whose association with alleged wine forger, Hardy Rodenstock, during the 1980s caused much embarrassment.

In July 2009, it was announced that Broadbent would sue Random House, the publishers of The Billionaire's Vinegar by Benjamin Wallace, an account of the "Jefferson bottles affair" and its court cases, for defamation of character, on claims that the book asserts Broadbent invented an auction bid and contains references to him colluding with Rodenstock. The suit was filed in London, and Random House initially stated it did not believe it had defamed Broadbent and would defend the lawsuit.

In October 2009, Random House accepted that the allegations in the book were without foundation, removed the book from sale in the UK, made a full apology and paid Broadbent an undisclosed sum in damages.

As Wallace was not party to the lawsuit or settlement, Random House continued to publish the book unamended, outside UK jurisdiction.

== Bibliography ==
- Guidance in the Techniques of Tasting (Harvey's of Bristol 1964)
- Guidance in the Techniques of Tasting (Brown & Prank 1966)
- Wine Tasting (1968, 13 editions, translated into 8 foreign languages various publishers)
- Wine Tasting, Enjoying, Understanding (1977)
- Michael Broadbent's Pocket Guide to Wine Tasting (1979, 7 editions Mitchell Beazley)
- The Great Vintage Wine Book (UK and US 1980, 1981; also in Dutch and German)
- The Complete Wine Taster & Cellarman (1984 Mitchell Beazley)
- The Great Vintage Wine Book II (UK and US 1991)
- Pocket Guide to Wine Vintages (1992, 1995, 2000)
- The Bordeaux Wine Atlas and Encyclopedia of Chateaux co-authored with Hubrecht Duijker (1997 in English, French, Dutch and German)
- Weine prüfen, kennen, genießen (1997)
- Meine Lieblingsweine (Falken 1997)
- Die Weine der Neuen Welt (Falken 1998)
- Michael Broadbent's Wine Vintages (Mitchell Beazley 1998, 2003)
- Vintage Wine (Webster's/Little Brown UK, Harcourt US 2002, 2003)
- Michael Broadbent's Wine Tasting (Mitchell Beazley Wine Guides 2000, 2003)
- Grosse Weine (Hallwag 2004)
- Michael Broadbent's Pocket Vintage Wine Companion (Anova 2007)

== See also ==
- Confrérie des Chevaliers du Tastevin
- List of wine personalities
