= Bramley Training Area =

British Army training camp

- Bramley, Hampshire
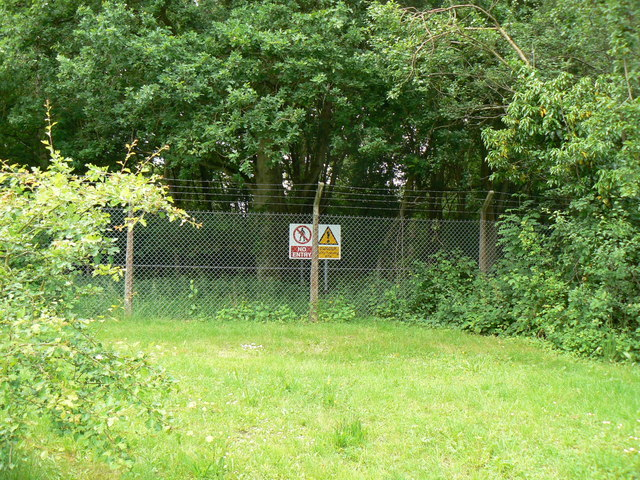
- Fence on edge of Bramley Training Area

Site information
- Type: Barracks
- Owner: Ministry of Defence
- Operator: British Army

Location
- Location within Hampshire
- Coordinates: 51°19′29″N 1°3′48″W

Site history
- Built: c.1914
- Built for: War Office
- In use: c.1914-Present

Bramley Training Area is a British Army training camp, located south of the village of Bramley, Hampshire. Opened during World War I as an ammunition depot, the site now comprises a field training area and an Army Reserve Centre at Lapraik House, the base for C Squadron, 21 Special Air Service.

== Bramley Ordnance Depot ==
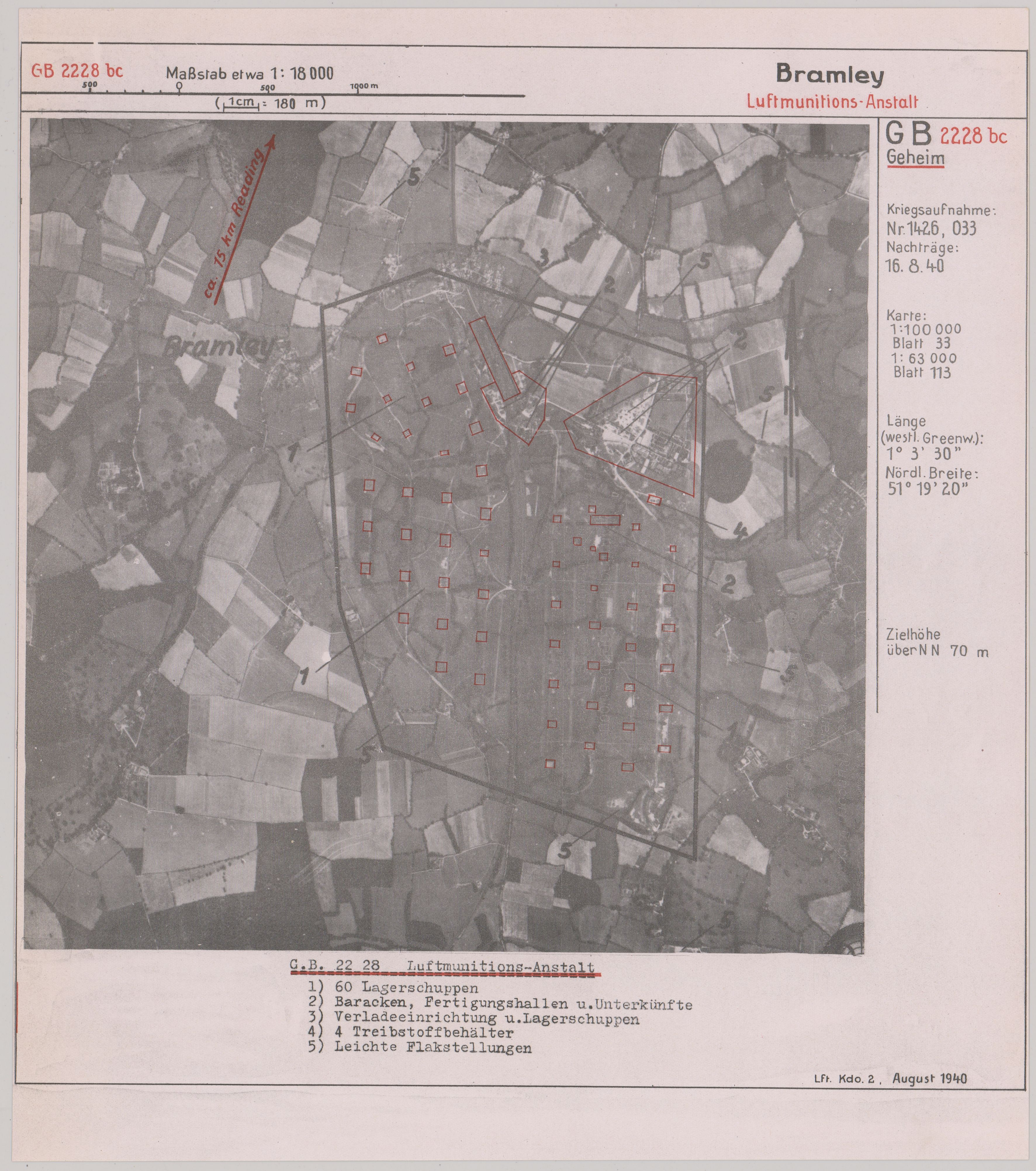
Bramley Ordnance Depot on a target dossier of the German Luftwaffe, 1940

Bramley Ordnance Depot (known as Central Ammunition Depot Bramley from 1946) opened on the large areas of scrub land in north Hampshire in 1917 for the manufacture and storage of ammunition. A School of Ammunition was established on the site in 1922.

To enable both safe manufacture and storage of munitions, well spaced railway tracks were built both sides of the Great Western Railway line connecting Basingstoke and Reading. The tracks were connected with each other at their northern and southern ends, and the tracks on either side of the running line were connected with each other by means of two tunnels under the GWR running lines. The tracks in the depot served various factories and stores, and the scale of the depot can be gauged that in a site measuring only 1.25 miles (2.01 km) from north to south, there were over 30 miles (48 km) of track: enough to cover the distance from Basingstoke to Reading and back. A spur northwards from the military yard reached the south side of Bramley station, which allowed through running services for depot workers. These started in 1922 but were suspended during World War II, and restarted after the war using stock from London Transport's Piccadilly line. The passenger services ceased in 1970, railway services to the depot ceased completely on 1 March 1987 with a special for rail enthusiasts.

The Central Ammunition Depot was served by the Garrison Church of St. Barbara (known locally as St. Barbara's Chapel). The register of baptisms (1956 to 1975) is now held by the National Archives, Kew. The stained glass window from St. Barbara's Chapel was removed to Bramley Church when the chapel was de-consecrated.

CAD Bramley closed in 1978, the School of Ammunition having relocated to Kineton two years earlier. The depot was then, however, taken over by the US Army, which continued to use it as an ammunition store until February 1987, when the last stocks were removed and the depot finally closed.

== Bramley Training Area ==
Following closure of the ammunitions depot, the facility was renamed Bramley Training Area and sub divided into three areas as training facility. Area A is the smallest, where parts of the ITV1 series Midsomer Murders have been filmed. In Area B, located near to the camp's main base, there is the shell of a Whirlwind helicopter on a concrete training area, adjacent to which there is a respirator test chamber. There are a number of other static helicopters including Lynx and Gazelle airframes in various states of repair scattered throughout the site. In Area C the Channel 4 television series Scrapheap Challenge was filmed. This area has now been cleared and the site is undergoing soil treatment.

The Training Area is used regularly by recruits from Recruit Training Squadron, RAF Halton for Exercise Blue Warrior. This exercise serves to confirm that the recruits can successfully operate in field conditions whilst demonstrating basic force protection skills.
