= James Arbuthnot =

British politician and life peer (born 1952)

The Right Honourable The Lord Arbuthnot of Edrom PC
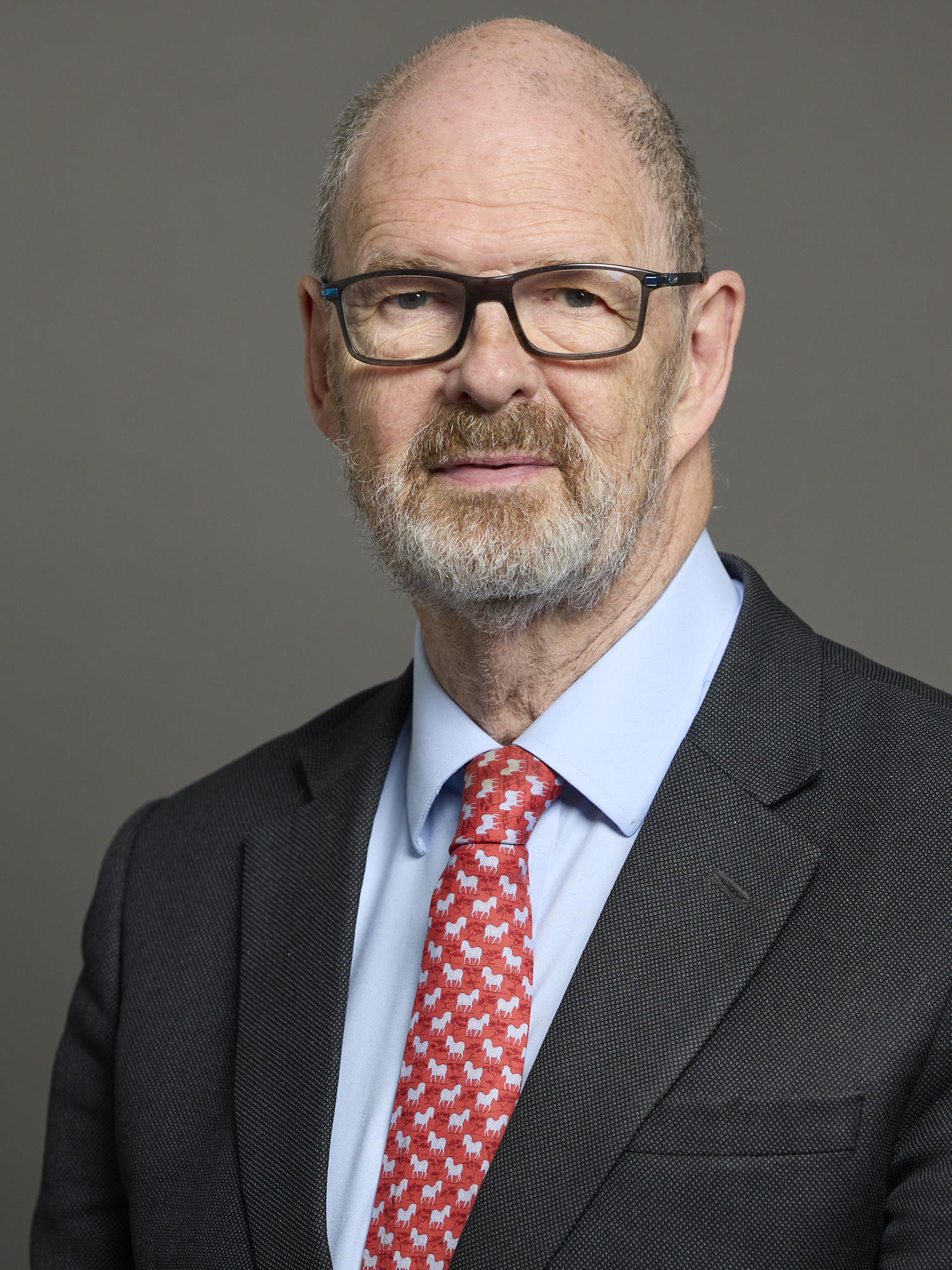
- Official portrait, 2025

Chairman of the Defence Select Committee
- In office 13 July 2005 – 14 May 2014
- Preceded by: Bruce George
- Succeeded by: Rory Stewart

Shadow Secretary of State for Trade
- In office 6 November 2003 – 6 May 2005
- Leader: Michael Howard
- Preceded by: Tim Yeo (Trade and Industry)
- Succeeded by: David Willetts (Trade and Industry)

Opposition Chief Whip in the House of Commons
- In office 23 June 1997 – 18 September 2001
- Leader: William Hague
- Preceded by: Alastair Goodlad
- Succeeded by: David Maclean

Minister of State for Defence Procurement
- In office 6 July 1995 – 2 May 1997
- Prime Minister: John Major
- Preceded by: Roger Freeman
- Succeeded by: John Gilbert

Parliamentary Under-Secretary of State for Social Security
- In office 20 July 1994 – 6 July 1995
- Prime Minister: John Major
- Preceded by: William Hague
- Succeeded by: Oliver Heald

Member of the House of Lords
- Lord Temporal
- Life peerage 1 October 2015

Member of Parliament for North East Hampshire
- In office 1 May 1997 – 30 March 2015
- Preceded by: Constituency created
- Succeeded by: Ranil Jayawardena

Member of Parliament for Wanstead and Woodford
- In office 11 June 1987 – 8 April 1997
- Preceded by: Patrick Jenkin
- Succeeded by: Constituency abolished

Personal details
- Born: 4 August 1952 (age 74) Deal, Kent, England
- Party: Conservative
- Spouse: Emma Broadbent (m. 1984)
- Children: 4
- Parent: Sir John Arbuthnot, 1st Baronet (father)
- Education: Trinity College, Cambridge; Inns of Court
- Website: www.jamesarbuthnot.com

James Norwich Arbuthnot, Baron Arbuthnot of Edrom, PC (born 4 August 1952), is a British Conservative Party politician. He was Member of Parliament (MP) for Wanstead and Woodford from 1987 to 1997, and then MP for North East Hampshire from 1997 to 2015.

Arbuthnot served as chairman of the Defence Select Committee from 2005 to 2014, before being nominated as a life peer in the Dissolution Peerages List 2015 of August 2015. Created Baron Arbuthnot of Edrom, of Edrom in the County of Berwick, on 1 October 2015, he sits on the Conservative benches in the House of Lords.

== Early life ==
Arbuthnot was born at Deal, Kent, the second son of Sir John Arbuthnot, 1st Baronet, MP for Dover between 1950 and 1964, and Margaret Jean Duff. He was educated at Wellesley House School in Broadstairs and Eton College, where he was captain of School, before going up to Trinity College, Cambridge, where he graduated with a degree in Law (BA) in 1974.

Arbuthnot was called to the Bar at Lincoln's Inn in 1975 and became a practising barrister. An active member of the Chelsea Conservative Association, he was elected a councillor of the Royal Borough of Kensington and Chelsea in 1978, and remained a councillor until he was elected to the House of Commons in 1987.

Arbuthnot contested the Cynon Valley seat, in the Labour heartland of industrial South Wales, at the 1983 general election and was defeated by Ioan Evans. A year later in 1984, Evans died and Arbuthnot fought the resulting by-election, but he was again defeated by the Labour candidate, Ann Clwyd.

== Member of Parliament ==
=== In Government (1988–1997) ===
In the 1987 general election, Arbuthnot was selected to contest the safe Conservative seat of Wanstead and Woodford, as the sitting MP, Patrick Jenkin, was standing down. Arbuthnot won the seat and increased the Conservative majority by over 2,000 to 16,412.

In 1988 he became the parliamentary private secretary (PPS) to Archie Hamilton at the Ministry of Defence, and in 1990 became the PPS to the Secretary of State for Trade and Industry, Peter Lilley. He entered the John Major government after the 1992 general election when he was made an assistant government whip. He was promoted in 1994 as the parliamentary under-secretary of state at the Department of Social Security. The following year he was promoted to Minister for Defence Procurement, where he remained until the end of the Major government in 1997.

=== In Opposition (1997–2010) ===
Arbuthnot's seat of Wanstead and Woodford was abolished at the 1997 general election, when he was selected for the new seat of North East Hampshire. In Opposition, he was a member of William Hague's Shadow Cabinet as the Conservative Party's Chief Whip until the 2001 general election when he returned to the backbenches. He was sworn of the Privy Council in 1998.

Arbuthnot returned to the Shadow Cabinet under Michael Howard as Shadow Trade Secretary in 2003, but stood down following the 2005 general election. Since that election he served as the chairman of the influential Defence Select Committee and was Chair of the Special Select Committee set up to scrutinise the Bill that became the Armed Forces Act 2011.

Arbuthnot was the parliamentary chairman of the Conservative Friends of Israel. He was also a member of the Top Level Group of UK Parliamentarians for Multilateral Nuclear Disarmament and Non-proliferation, established in October 2009.

In the 2009 expenses scandal, Arbuthnot apologised and repaid the public money he had claimed for his swimming pool to be cleaned. Later that year, he was further criticised in the press for £15,000 of expenses he claimed for upkeep at his second home, including tree surgery and painting his summer house.

=== Back in Government (2010–2015) ===
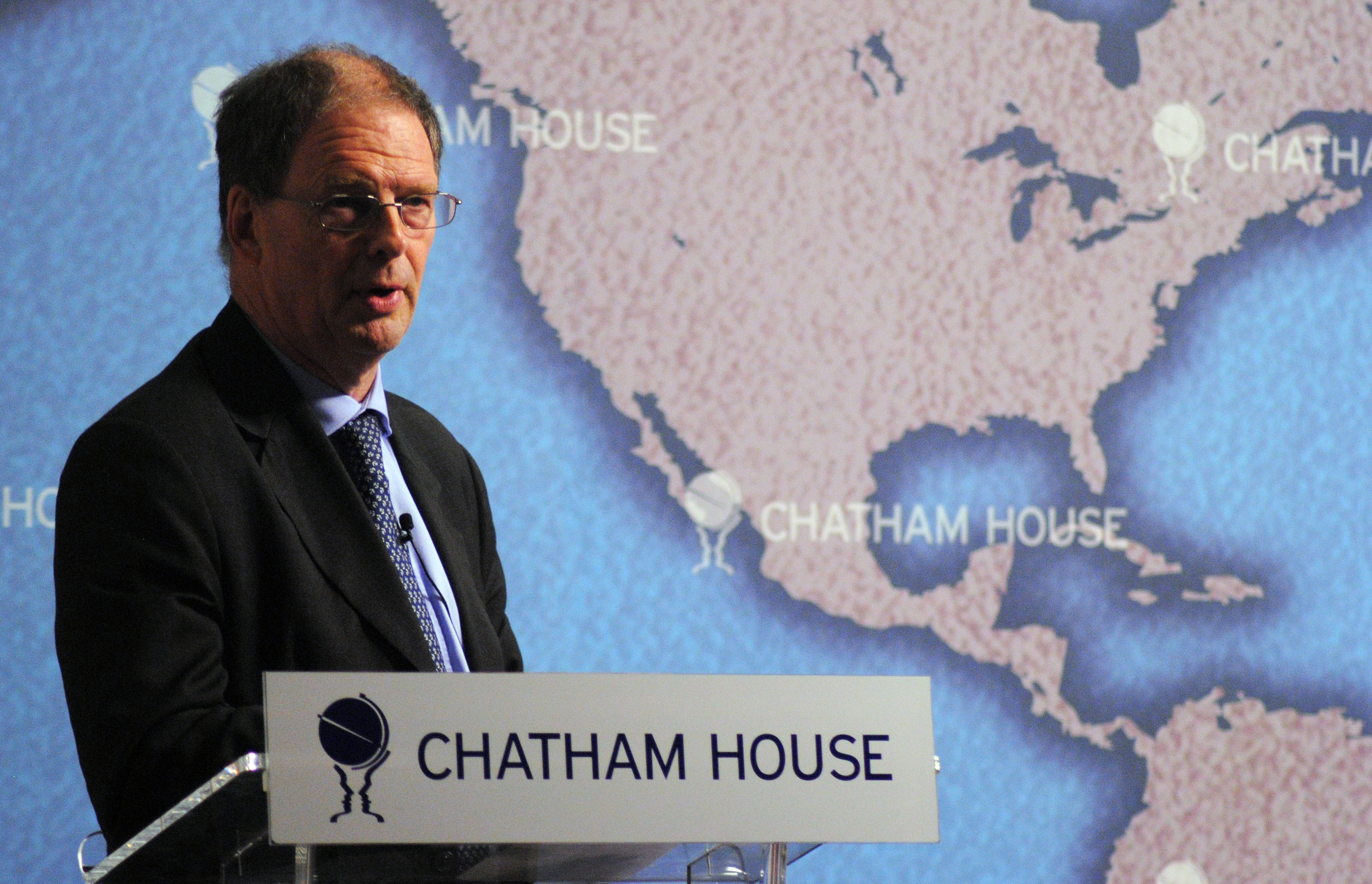
Arbuthnot in 2010

In June 2011, Arbuthnot announced that he would not contest the next general election. On 16 January 2015, he publicly declared his atheism, stating "the pressure on a Conservative politician, particularly of keeping quiet about not being religious, is very similar to the pressure that there has been about keeping quiet about being gay"; he later clarified that he is not gay.

==== British Post Office scandal ====
Arbuthnot has played a pivotal role in helping the subpostmasters affected by the British Post Office scandal to seek justice after the Post Office wrongly – and, it has been alleged, knowingly – sought and obtained convictions for theft, fraud and false accounting against a large number of them. In September 2023, he supported the £600,000 "take it or leave it" Government compensation for those wrongly convicted saying on The World Tonight on BBC Radio 4, it was "a choice", and that "for some it will be a good way of putting this behind them and getting on with their lives". Arbuthnot was portrayed by Alex Jennings in Mr Bates vs The Post Office, an ITV dramatisation of the scandal.

== Personal life ==
On 6 September 1984, Arbuthnot married Emma Louise Broadbent, daughter of Michael Broadbent, Wine Director of Christie's. Since 2020 she has been a High Court judge, having previously served as the Senior District Judge (Chief Magistrate) for England and Wales.

Arbuthnot is the chairman of the advisory board of the UK division of multinational defence and security systems manufacturer Thales. He is a Senior Associate Fellow of the defence and security think tank Royal United Services Institute for Defence and Security Studies. He has also served as a Commissioner of the National Preparedness Commission.

He is a descendant of James V of Scotland. His middle name is after his great-great-grandfather, Norwich Duff (1792–1862). He is also a distant cousin of Gerald Arbuthnot, the former MP for Burnley.

== Arms ==
Coat of arms of James Arbuthnot
Notes The Arms depicted are those of his father and his elder brother Coronet That of a Baron Crest A Peacock's Head and Neck Proper accompanied on either side by a Spray of Strawberry Leaves Vert each flowered of a Cinquefoil Argent Escutcheon Azure a Crescent between three Mullets Argent a Bordure Gules charged with two Escallops in chief and a Buck's Head cabossed Or in base Motto Deum Laudans (Praising God) Symbolism Arbuthnot of Kittybrewster arms

== See also ==
- Clan Arbuthnott
- Court of Lord Lyon
- Viscount of Arbuthnott

Parliament of the United Kingdom
Preceded by Patrick Jenkin	Member of Parliament for Wanstead and Woodford; 1987–1997	Constituency abolished
New constituency	Member of Parliament for North East Hampshire; 1997–2015	Succeeded by Ranil Jayawardena
Party political offices
Preceded by Alastair Goodlad	Conservative Chief Whip in the House of Commons; 1997–2001	Succeeded by David Maclean
Political offices
Preceded by Alastair Goodlad	Opposition Chief Whip in the House of Commons; 1997–2001	Succeeded by David Maclean
Preceded by Tim Yeo as Shadow Secretary of State for Trade and Industry	Shadow Secretary of State for Trade; 2003–2005	Succeeded by David Willetts as Shadow Secretary of State for Trade and Industry
Orders of precedence in the United Kingdom
Preceded by The Lord Gilbert of Panteg	Gentlemen; Baron Arbuthnot of Edrom	Followed by The Lord O'Shaughnessy
