= Wanstead and Woodford (constituency) =

Parliamentary constituency in the United Kingdom, 1964–1997

- Former borough constituency for the House of Commons
- County: Greater London

1964–1997
- Seats: One
- Created from: Woodford
- Replaced by: Chingford & Woodford Green, Ilford North, and Leyton & Wanstead

Wanstead and Woodford was a constituency in North East London, represented in the House of Commons of the Parliament of the United Kingdom. It elected one Member of Parliament (MP) by the first past the post system of election. The constituency existed from the 1964 general election until it was abolished in the 1997 general election.

== History of results ==
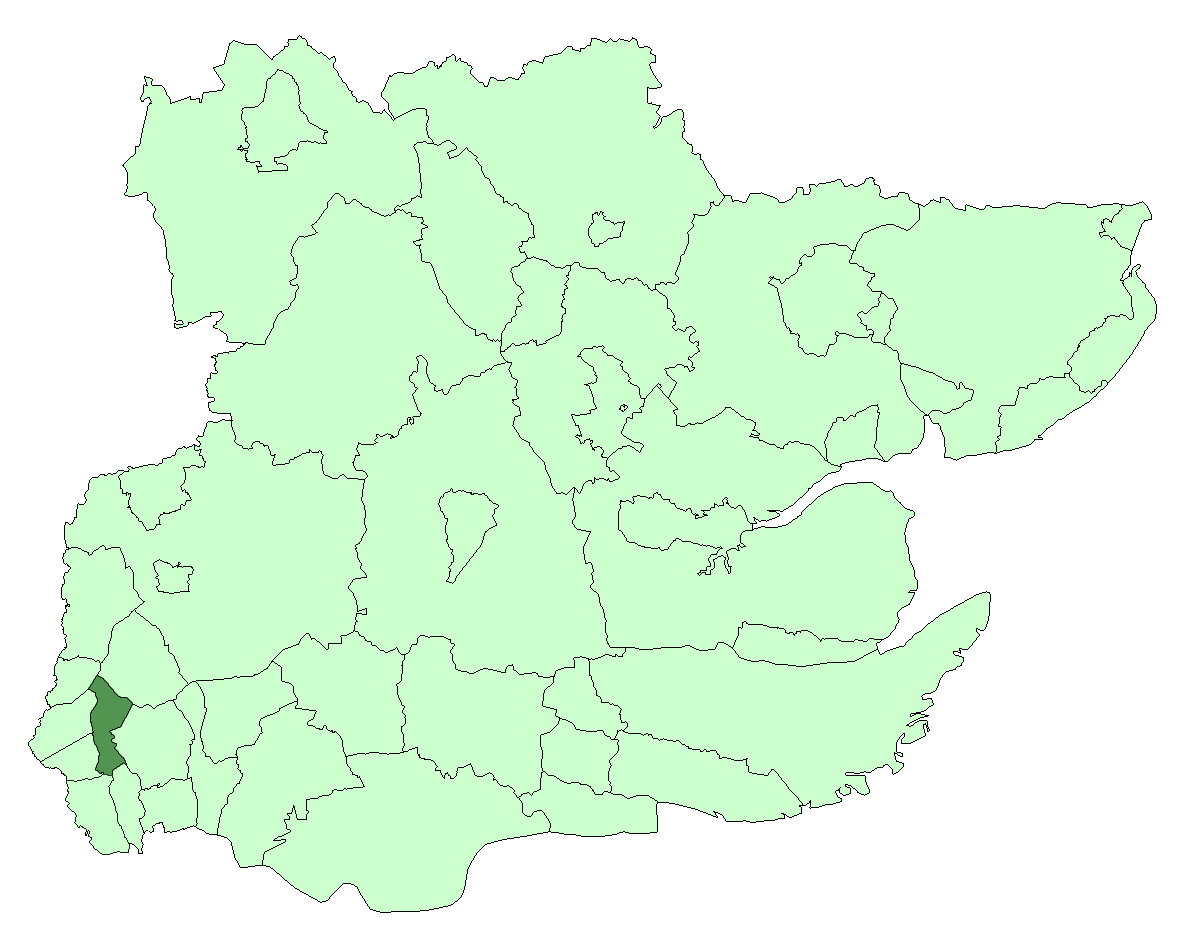
The original extent of the constituency from 1964 to 1974, shown by the shaded council area in local government terms

Approximate boundaries of the constituency in its second form. Click for surrounding seats. (Colouring: Feb 1974 results)
Approximate boundaries of the constituency in its final form. Click for surrounding seats. (Colouring: 1987 results)

Between 51.7% and 63.6% of voters in the constituency supported the Conservative candidate in general elections (no by-elections occurred during this period). The runner-up party alternated between Liberal and Labour candidates, with the Conservative majority over the runner-up ranging from 26.7% to 43%.

== Boundaries ==
1964–1974: The constituency covered the area of the Municipal Borough of Wanstead and Woodford in Essex. From 1965 to 1974, this area fell under the London Borough of Redbridge for local government purposes.

1974–1983: The constituency comprised the following wards in the London Borough of Redbridge: Bridge, Clayhall, Snaresbrook, Wanstead, and Woodford.

1983–1997: The constituency included the London Borough of Redbridge wards of Bridge, Church End, Clayhall, Monkhams, Roding, Snaresbrook, and Wanstead.

== Creation and successors ==
This seat was defined by the Parliamentary Constituencies (Ilford and Woodford) Order 1960, which took effect at the next general election, held in 1964. This Order adjusted the boundaries of Ilford North, Ilford South, and Woodford (which was renamed Wanstead and Woodford), to align with the borough boundaries set in 1956.

This was the only boundary adjustment for any constituencies between the 1955 and February 1974 general elections.

Until 1974, the seat closely mirrored its predecessor, Woodford, with only minor boundary changes.

The constituency was dissolved in 1997 and divided to:

- Form parts of new constituencies:
  - Chingford and Woodford Green (Church End and Monkhams wards)
  - Leyton and Wanstead (Snaresbrook and Wanstead wards)
- Expand Ilford North, incorporating Bridge, Clayhall, and Roding wards.

Proposals to re-establish the seat were included in the Boundary Commission review published on 13 September 2011. If implemented, the new seat would consist of the wards Monkhams, Bridge, Church End, Roding, Snaresbrook, and Wanstead, with Clayhall rejoining, along with the addition of Cranbrook and Valentines in Redbridge, located east of the A406 trunk road.

== Members of Parliament ==
Election	Member	Party
1964	Patrick Jenkin	Conservative
1987	James Arbuthnot	Conservative
1997	constituency abolished: see Chingford and Woodford Green, Ilford North & Leyton and Wanstead	

== Elections ==
=== Elections in the 1960s ===
General election 1964: Wanstead and Woodford
Party	Candidate	Votes	%	±%
Conservative	Patrick Jenkin	19,580	55.31	−15.93
Liberal	John Ernest Lockwood	8,901	25.15	N/A
Labour	James George Morrell	6,917	19.54	−9.22
Majority		10,679	30.17	−12.31
Turnout		35,398	79.35	+2.06
Conservative win (new seat)				

General election 1966: Wanstead and Woodford
Party	Candidate	Votes	%	±%
Conservative	Patrick Jenkin	19,063	56.07	+0.76
Labour	David Edward de Saxe	8,785	25.84	+6.30
Liberal	John Charles Griffiths	6,150	18.09	−7.06
Majority		10,278	30.23	+0.06
Turnout		33,998	76.82	−2.53
Conservative hold		Swing		

=== Elections in the 1970s ===
General election 1970: Wanstead and Woodford
Party	Candidate	Votes	%	±%
Conservative	Patrick Jenkin	20,065	61.15	+5.08
Labour	Anthony Philip Barker	8,522	25.97	+0.13
Liberal	Richard Hugh Hoskins	4,224	12.87	−5.22
Majority		11,543	35.18	+4.95
Turnout		32,811	67.77	−9.05
Conservative hold		Swing		

General election February 1974: Wanstead and Woodford
Party	Candidate	Votes	%	±%
Conservative	Patrick Jenkin	23,056	51.72	
Liberal	DJ Gilby	11,155	25.02	
Labour	R Darlington	10,365	23.25	
Majority		11,901	26.70	
Turnout		44,576		
Conservative hold		Swing		

General election October 1974: Wanstead and Woodford
Party	Candidate	Votes	%	±%
Conservative	Patrick Jenkin	21,209	53.20	
Labour	R Darlington	10,369	26.02	
Liberal	DJ Gilby	8,272	20.76	
Majority		10,840	27.18	
Turnout		39,850		
Conservative hold		Swing		

General election 1979: Wanstead and Woodford
Party	Candidate	Votes	%	±%
Conservative	Patrick Jenkin	26,214	63.61	
Labour	Michael Mcnulty	8,464	20.54	
Liberal	Alan Cornish	6,535	15.86	
National Front	Charles Bond	957	2.32	New
Majority		17,750	43.07	
Turnout		42,170		
Conservative hold		Swing		

=== Elections in the 1980s ===
General election 1983: Wanstead and Woodford
Party	Candidate	Votes	%	±%
Conservative	Patrick Jenkin	23,765	60.25	
Liberal	Keith Crawford	9,411	23.86	
Labour	Lesley Hilton	5,334	13.52	
Ecology	Cynthia Warth	476	1.21	New
National Front	Harold Marshall	456	1.16	
Majority		14,354	36.39	
Turnout		39,442	68.35	
Conservative hold		Swing		

General election 1987: Wanstead and Woodford
Party	Candidate	Votes	%	±%
Conservative	James Arbuthnot	25,701	61.3	+0.9
Liberal	John Bastick	9,289	22.1	−1.8
Labour	Lesley Hilton	6,958	16.6	+3.1
Majority		16,412	39.2	+2.8
Turnout		41,948	72.4	+4.1
Conservative hold		Swing	+1.4	

=== Elections in the 1990s ===
General election 1992: Wanstead and Woodford
Party	Candidate	Votes	%	±%
Conservative	James Arbuthnot	26,204	60.0	−1.3
Labour	Lyn Brown	9,319	21.3	+4.7
Liberal Democrats	Gary P. Staight	7,362	16.8	−5.3
Green	Francis M. Roads	637	1.5	New
Natural Law	Anthony J. Brickell	178	0.4	New
Majority		16,885	38.7	−0.5
Turnout		43,700	78.3	+5.9
Conservative hold		Swing	−3.0	

== See also ==
- List of parliamentary constituencies in London
