= Pamber End =

Hamlet in Hampshire, England

Coordinates: 51.3217°N 1.1183°W

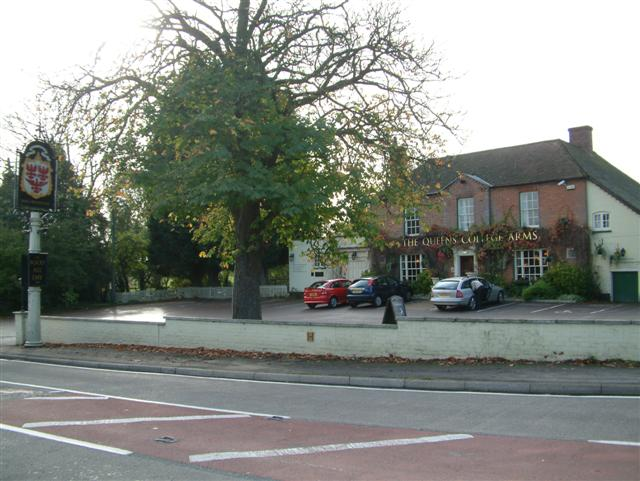
- The Queen's College Arms, Pamber End.

- Location within Hampshire
- Civil parish: Pamber
- District: Basingstoke and Deane
- Shire county: Hampshire
- Region: South East
- Country: England
- Sovereign state: United Kingdom
- Police: Hampshire and Isle of Wight
- Fire: Hampshire and Isle of Wight
- Ambulance: South Central
- UK Parliament: North West Hampshire
- Website: Pamber parish

Pamber End is a hamlet in north Hampshire, England. Located south of Tadley.

== Governance ==
Pamber End is part of the civil parish of Pamber (where the 2011 civil parish was included), which covers Pamber Heath, Pamber End, Pamber Green and Little London. The parish council meets in Pamber Heath Memorial Hall and St. Stephen's Hall, Little London.

Pamber End is within the ward of Pamber and Sichester, part of Basingstoke and Deane Borough Council which returns two councillors to the borough council. The borough council is a Non-metropolitan district of Hampshire County Council. All three councils are responsible for different aspects of local government.
