= Bartholomew Broadbent =

British wine expert

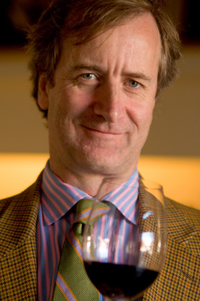
Bartholomew Broadbent

Bartholomew Broadbent (born 11 January 1962) is a British wine expert specializing in Port and Madeira. He is the son of the wine critic Michael Broadbent and brother of Dame Emma Arbuthnot. He lives in Virginia with his wife and two children, Charlotte Broadbent and Henry Broadbent. He goes by the nickname of Bollew.

== Career ==
In 1989, Broadbent pioneered the reintroduction of Madeira wine in the US which had effectively disappeared following Prohibition after being one of the most widely consumed alcoholic drinks.

Broadbent campaigns on clarity of alcohol levels on wine packaging and promotes Virginia wines.

=== Broadbent Label ===
Broadbent produces, under the Broadbent label and through his company Broadbent Selections, a variety of wines which include Port and Vinho Verde in Portugal, Malbec in Argentina and Gruner Veltliner in Austria as well as a selection of Madeiras. He is the largest importer of Madeira into North America.

=== Wineries ===
Broadbent set up the Dragon's Hollow in China's northern-central Ningxia Hui region which is the first internationally focused winery in China, and in South Africa he launched Vilafonte which was the first South African-American partnership in wine-making.

=== Media ===
Broadbent is the Into Wine resident wine expert, and a regular contributor to their web TV channel and the “Wine Guy” on the San Francisco based radio station KFOG.

== Awards and honors ==
Broadbent was listed as #48 in the 2013 Into Wine 100 Most Influential People in the US Wine Industry.

Decanter magazine named him one of the “fifty most influential in the wine world…the faces to watch in the new millennium” in 1997.

Wine & Spirits magazine named him one of ten in the world to be “driving the most revolutionary changes in wine” in 2008.

His company Broadbent Selections Inc was nominated one of the top five wine importers by Wine Enthusiast magazine in 2005 and 2020.

He was made a Cavaleiro of the Confraria do Vinho do Porto in 1989 and is a past Director of Steven Spurrier’s Académie du Vin and a founder of L’Academie du Vin in Toronto.
