= Pamber =

Civil parish in Hampshire, England

Coordinates: 51°20′N 1°8′W

Pamber is a civil parish located in the north of Hampshire, England, near the border with Berkshire. The parish population at the 2011 Census was 2,613. It contains four settlements: Pamber Heath, Pamber Green, Pamber End and Little London.

Formerly part of Basingstoke Rural District, it is now part of Basingstoke and Deane district.
