= Alex Brewer (politician) =

British politician

Alex Brewer MP
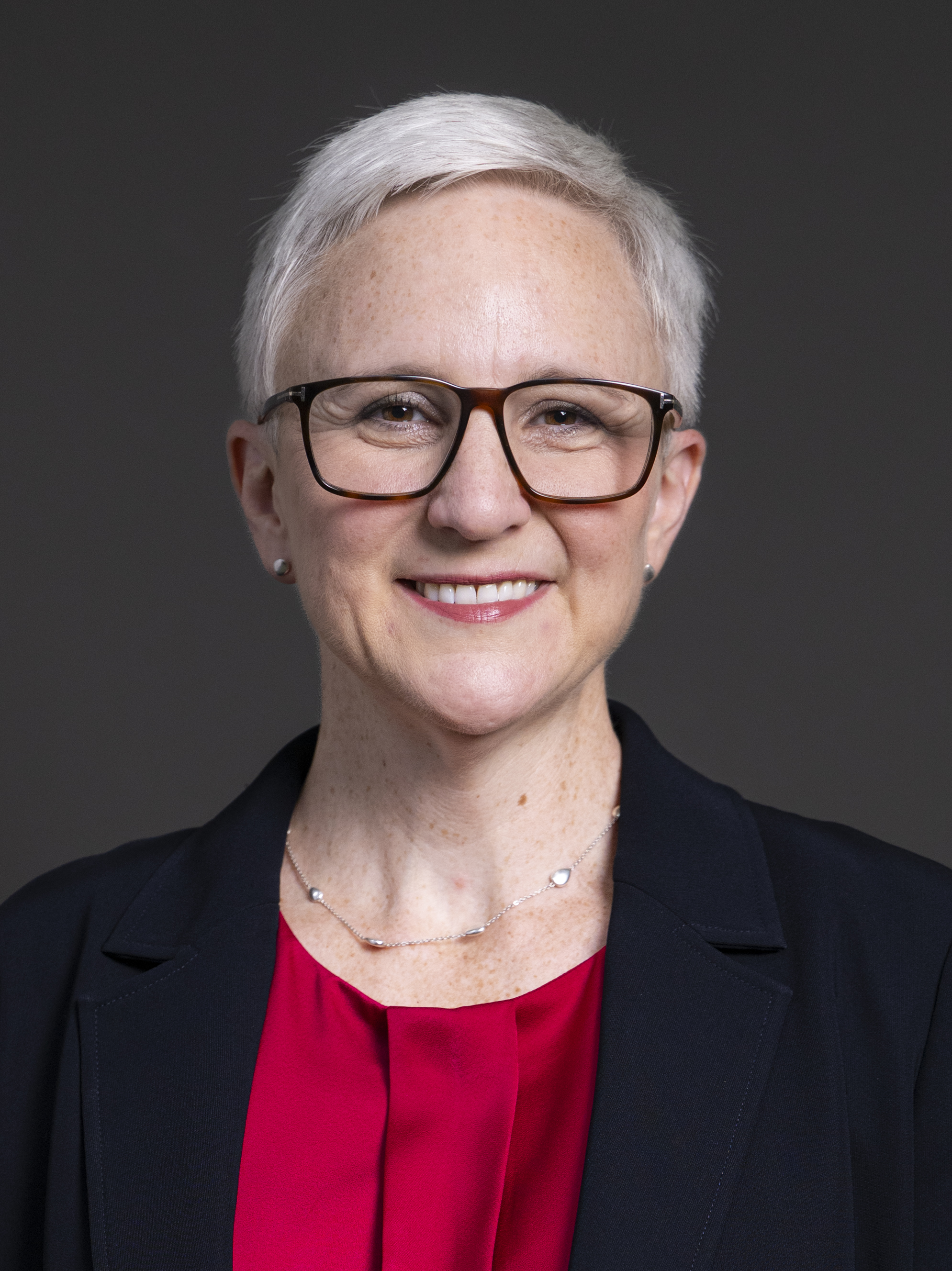
- Official portrait, 2026

Member of Parliament for North East Hampshire
- Incumbent
- Assumed office 4 July 2024
- Preceded by: Ranil Jayawardena
- Majority: 634 (1.1%)

Personal details
- Party: Liberal Democrats
- Education: Durham University

Alexandra Katherine Brewer is a British Liberal Democrat politician who has served as Member of Parliament (MP) for North East Hampshire since 2024.

== Career ==
Before becoming an MP, Brewer ran Stepping Stones DS, a children's charity within her constituency that provides support to children with Down Syndrome, their families, and the professionals involved in their care. She also formerly ran a women's refuge, and has experience working in the business sector in the United Kingdom, Japan, Germany and Australia.

== Parliamentary career ==
Brewer was elected as Member of Parliament (MP) for North East Hampshire at the 2024 general election, defeating the incumbent Conservative MP Ranil Jayawardena with 38.1 per cent of the vote and a majority of 634. She is the third MP to represent the constituency, and both the first woman and the first Liberal Democrat to represent the constituency, which was created in 1997, with significant boundary changes in 2010 and further boundary changes in 2024.

In her maiden speech, Brewer delivered a narrative tour of North East Hampshire; individually mentioning several towns and villages by name, noting features and characteristics of the local area and community, and describing the key issues faced by her constituents.

In an interview with the Basingstoke Gazette, Brewer stated that her political priorities were to improve the NHS, to resolve the sewage crisis, and to provide better services for children with Special Educational Needs (SEN).

In September 2024, Brewer strongly criticised, and voted to block, the government's plans to means-test the Winter Fuel Payment, writing that she was "extremely concerned about those on low incomes", and could not condone the decision "to further add to the burden faced by some of the most vulnerable people in our society, especially during a cost-of-living crisis."

On the 25 October 2024, Brewer announced that she had been elected to the House of Commons Select Committee for Women and Equalities.

Parliament of the United Kingdom
Preceded by Ranil Jayawardena	Member of Parliament for North East Hampshire; 2024–present	Incumbent
