= Emma Arbuthnot =

British judge (born 1959)

The Right Honourable Mrs Justice Arbuthnot DBE
- Royal coat of arms of the United Kingdom

High Court Judge Family Division
- Incumbent
- Assumed office 1 February 2021
- Monarchs: Elizabeth II; Charles III
- Division: Family (High Court of Justice)

Personal details
- Born: Emma Louise Broadbent; 9 January 1959 (age 67) Macclesfield, Cheshire, England
- Spouse(s): James Arbuthnot (m. 1984) Baron Arbuthnot of Edrom (cr. 2015)
- Children: 4
- Parent: Michael Broadbent (father)
- Relatives: Bartholomew Broadbent (bro); Broadbent baronets (kinsmen)
- Education: Lycée Français de Londres
- Alma mater: Queen Mary College, London
- Occupation: Barrister; judge
- Profession: Law

Emma Louise Arbuthnot, Baroness Arbuthnot of Edrom DBE (née Broadbent; born 9 January 1959), known professionally as Mrs Justice Arbuthnot, serves as a High Court judge for England and Wales since 2021.

== Early life and education ==
Born in 1959 at Macclesfield, Cheshire, the only daughter of wine critic Michael Broadbent, she grew up in London and was educated at the French Lycée. She then read law at Queen Mary College, London (BA), before pursuing further legal studies at City University (Dip. Law).

On 6 September 1984, she married James Arbuthnot, later Baron Arbuthnot of Edrom, a barrister and British Conservative Party politician.

== Career ==
Called to the Bar at the Inner Temple in 1986, Arbuthnot was appointed as a Deputy District Judge (Magistrates' Courts) in 2000, a Recorder in 2001 (Crime and then Family), a full time District Judge (Magistrates' Courts) in 2005, the Deputy Senior District Judge (Deputy Chief Magistrate) in 2012, the Senior District Judge (Chief Magistrate) for England and Wales in 2016, and a Justice of the High Court of England and Wales in 2020 (with effect from 2021).

=== Rulings as High Court Judge ===
==== Archie Battersbee ====
Arbuthnot oversaw Archie Battersbee's case in the Family Division of the High Court, London. In a final hearing, which took place on 6 and 7 June 2022, she ruled that doctors could terminate the patient's treatment and end his life support. The family was given limited time to launch appeal proceedings. However, following another hearing, Arbuthnot granted the parents permission to take the case to the Court of Appeal. The Court of Appeal later ruled that the High Court should reconsider its opinion as to whether he was brain-dead, and that a new hearing of the Court of Appeal would be set for 11 July 2022. The Court of Appeal subsequently denied the appeal on 25 June 2022. The Court of Appeal agreed to stay their ruling for 48 hours to give Archie's parents time to ask for an appeal to the Supreme Court of the United Kingdom or to the European Court of Human Rights.

=== Rulings as Chief Magistrate ===
==== First Unexplained Wealth Order ====
As Chief Magistrate, Lady Arbuthnot made rulings related to the fugitive Indian tycoon Vijay Mallya, and Zamira Hajiyeva, the first person subject to an unexplained wealth order (UWO).

==== Julian Assange ====
Towards the end of 2019, Arbuthnot, who had presided at several of Julian Assange's extradition hearings, stepped aside because of a "perception of bias", apparently linked to her husband.

==== Uber ====
Uber's application for a five-year licence was rejected by Transport for London in September 2017. In June 2018, Arbuthnot granted Uber a probationary 15-month licence for London. An investigation by The Observer newspaper reported that Arbuthnot's husband, James Arbuthnot, was a director of SC Strategy Ltd during Uber's appeal before his wife. SC Strategy Ltd is a private intelligence company which has worked for the sovereign wealth fund Qatar Investment Authority (QIA), one of the main investors in a $1.2 billion financing arrangement for Uber. After The Observer's report was published, Lady Arbuthnot withdrew from hearing any further appeals by the company.

==== Grenfell ====
In August 2019, Arbuthnot cleared Paul Bussetti, a man accused of filming a Grenfell Tower effigy being burned at a bonfire night party, whilst a group of friends laughed and joked. Her decision was overturned by the High Court in August 2021. At retrial in 2022, Bussetti pled guilty and was sentenced to 10 weeks in jail, suspended for two years.

== See also ==
- Baron Arbuthnot of Edrom
