= Pamber Heath =

Village and parish in Hampshire, England

Coordinates: 51.3583°N 1.1167°W

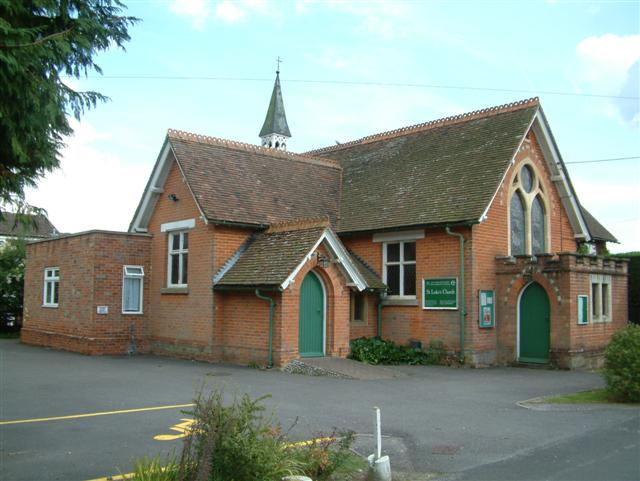
- St. Luke's Church, Pamber Heath.

- Location within Hampshire
- OS grid reference: SU615625
- District: Basingstoke and Deane
- Shire county: Hampshire
- Region: South East
- Country: England
- Sovereign state: United Kingdom
- Police: Hampshire and Isle of Wight
- Fire: Hampshire and Isle of Wight
- Ambulance: South Central
- UK Parliament: North West Hampshire

Pamber Heath is a village in north Hampshire, England. Situated within the civil parish of Pamber, the village lies at the north end of Pamber Forest.

== Governance ==
Pamber Heath is part of the parish of Pamber, which covers Pamber Heath, Pamber End, Pamber Green and Little London. The parish council meets in Pamber Heath Memorial Hall and St. Stephen's Hall, Little London.

Pamber Heath is within the ward of Pamber and Silchester, part of the Basingstoke and Deane Borough Council, and returns two councillors to the borough council.

== Transport ==
There is a village link minibus service which serves Pamber Heath, Silchester and Mortimer West End. It is necessary to pre-book this service by contacting Hampshire County Council.
