= Bramley railway station (Hampshire) =

Railway station in Hampshire, England

Coordinates: 51.330°N 1.061°W

Bramley (Hampshire)
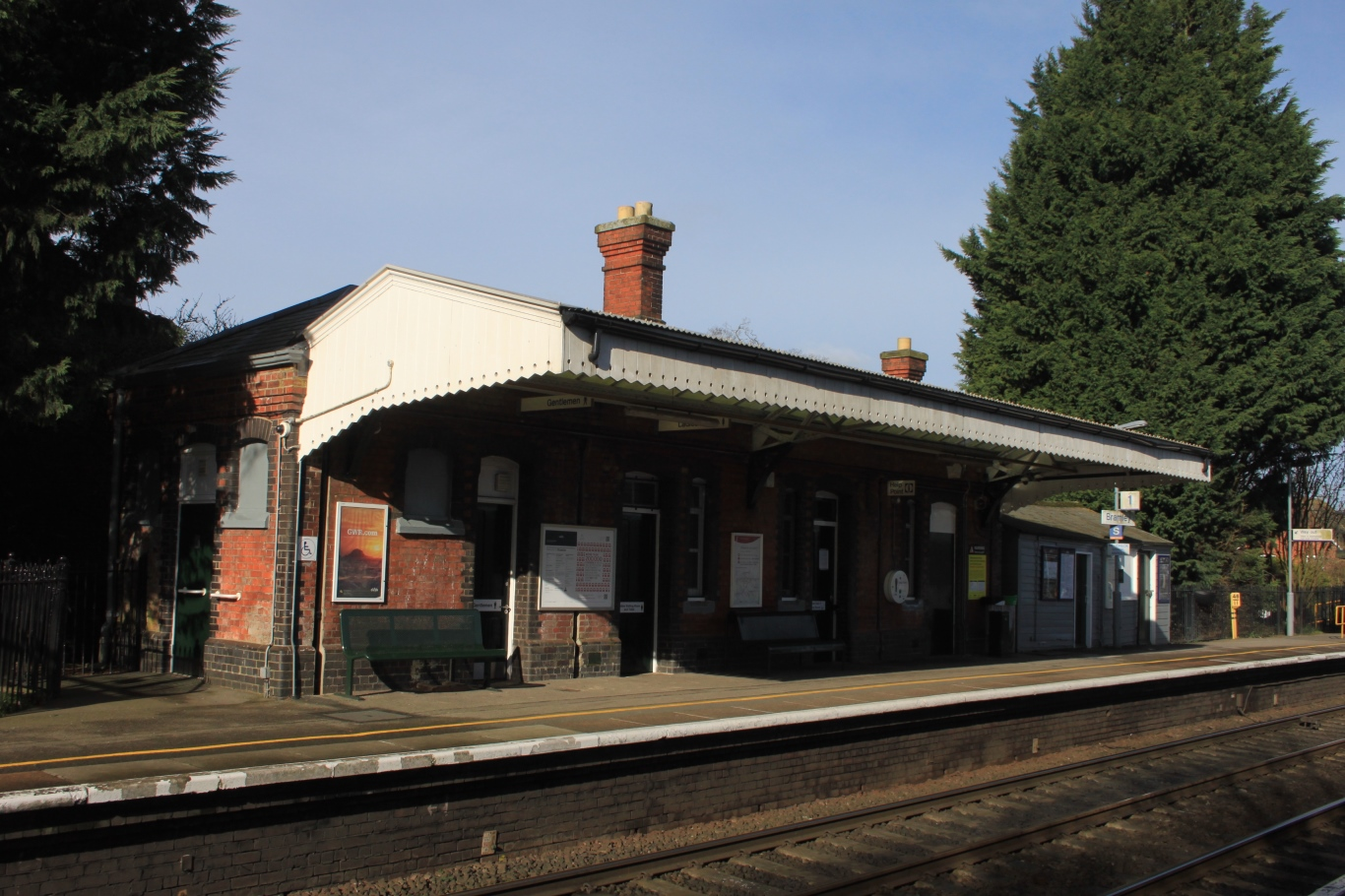
- Bramley railway station in 2017

General information
- Location: Bramley, Basingstoke and Deane; England
- Grid reference: SU655594
- Managed by: Great Western Railway
- Platforms: 2

Other information
- Station code: BMY
- Classification: DfT category F2

Key dates
- 1 May 1895: Opened

Passengers
- 2020/21: ▼87,738
- 2021/22: ▲0.183 million
- 2022/23: ▲0.220 million
- 2023/24: ▲0.241 million
- 2024/25: ▲0.265 million
Location
Notes
- Passenger statistics from the Office of Rail and Road

Bramley railway station is on the Reading to Basingstoke Line in Bramley, Hampshire, England. It is 46 miles 41 chains (74.9 km) from London Paddington and is served by Great Western Railway's local services between Basingstoke and Reading. The station is 5 miles (8 km) north of Basingstoke. The line opened in 1848, but the station did not open until 1895. There is a level crossing at the north end of the platforms.

== Services ==
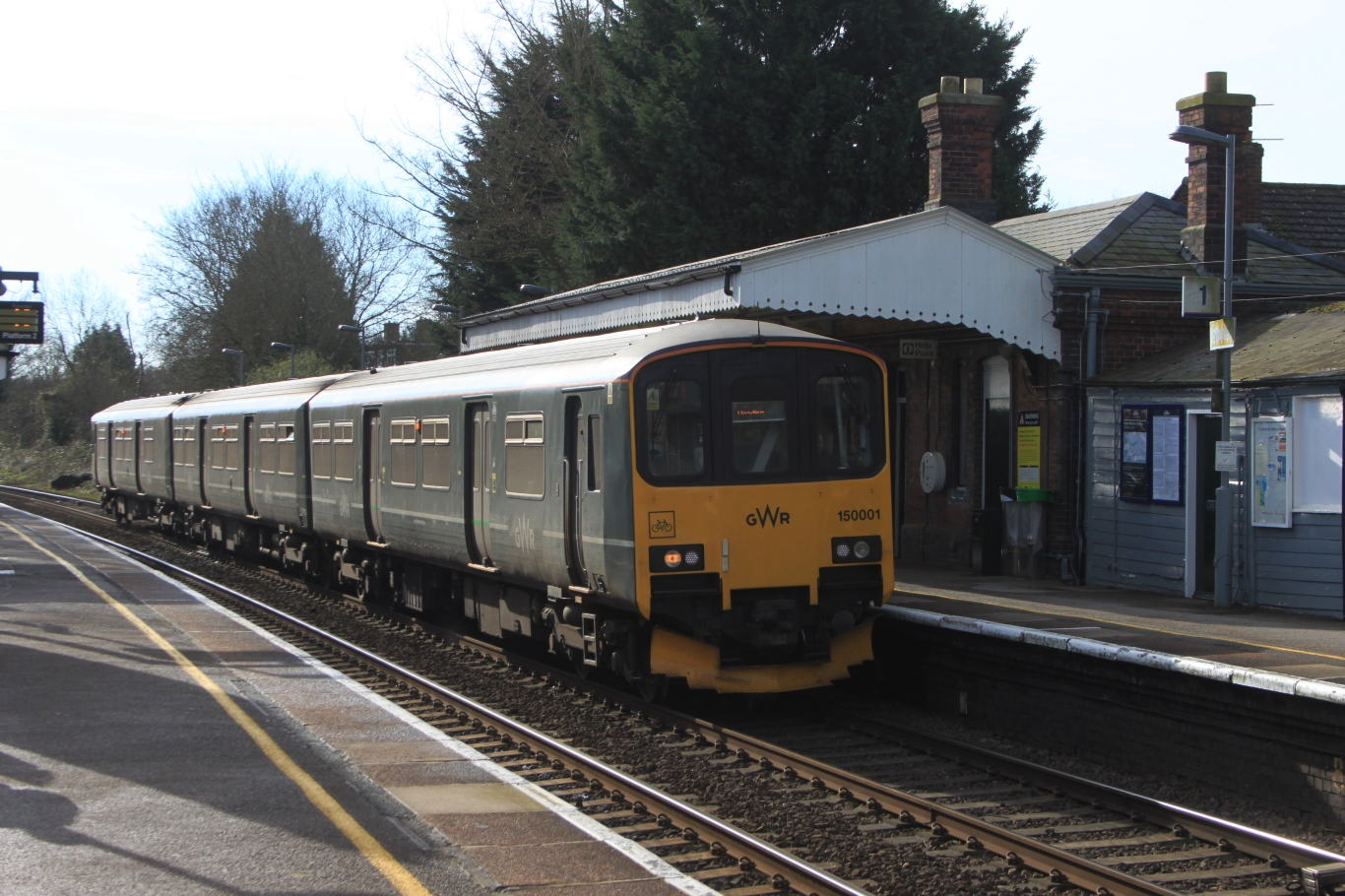
A GWR service to Reading

All services at Bramley are operated by Great Western Railway using Class 165 and 166 DMUs.

The typical off-peak service is two trains per hour in each direction between Reading and Basingstoke. On Sundays, the service is reduced to hourly in each direction.

Preceding station	National Rail	Following station
Mortimer	Great Western Railway Reading to Basingstoke Line	Basingstoke

== Facilities ==
The station is staffed during the mornings Monday-Saturday, while it remains unstaffed on Sundays. It has a ticket office on platform 1 which is open during these times. Outside these hours, tickets may be purchased from a ticket machine located on either platform.

Both platforms can be accessed step-free by a ramp from the street on either side of the level crossing. There is no footbridge nor subway and thus the opposite platform can only be accessed while the level crossing is open.

An accessible toilet and waiting room can be found on platform 1. There is a smaller, unlit waiting room on platform 2. Both platforms have outdoor seating under shelter.

== Onward Travel ==
The station has no carpark, though there is a drop-off and pick-up point. There is no taxi rank, though accessible taxis can be arranged with GWR staff. The A33 is 2 miles east of the station.

The station is served by Stagecoach with the 14 bus route from Basingstoke to Tadley via Silchester and Pamber Heath from the Sherfield Road bus stop. This bus runs Monday-Friday with a once every two hour frequency in the morning and once every 90 minute frequency in the afternoon. There is a reduced service on Saturdays and no service on Sundays. Rail replacement busses also run from the same bus stop.
