= Bramley, Hampshire =

Village and parish in Hampshire, England

Coordinates: 51.3290°N 1.0613°W

Bramley
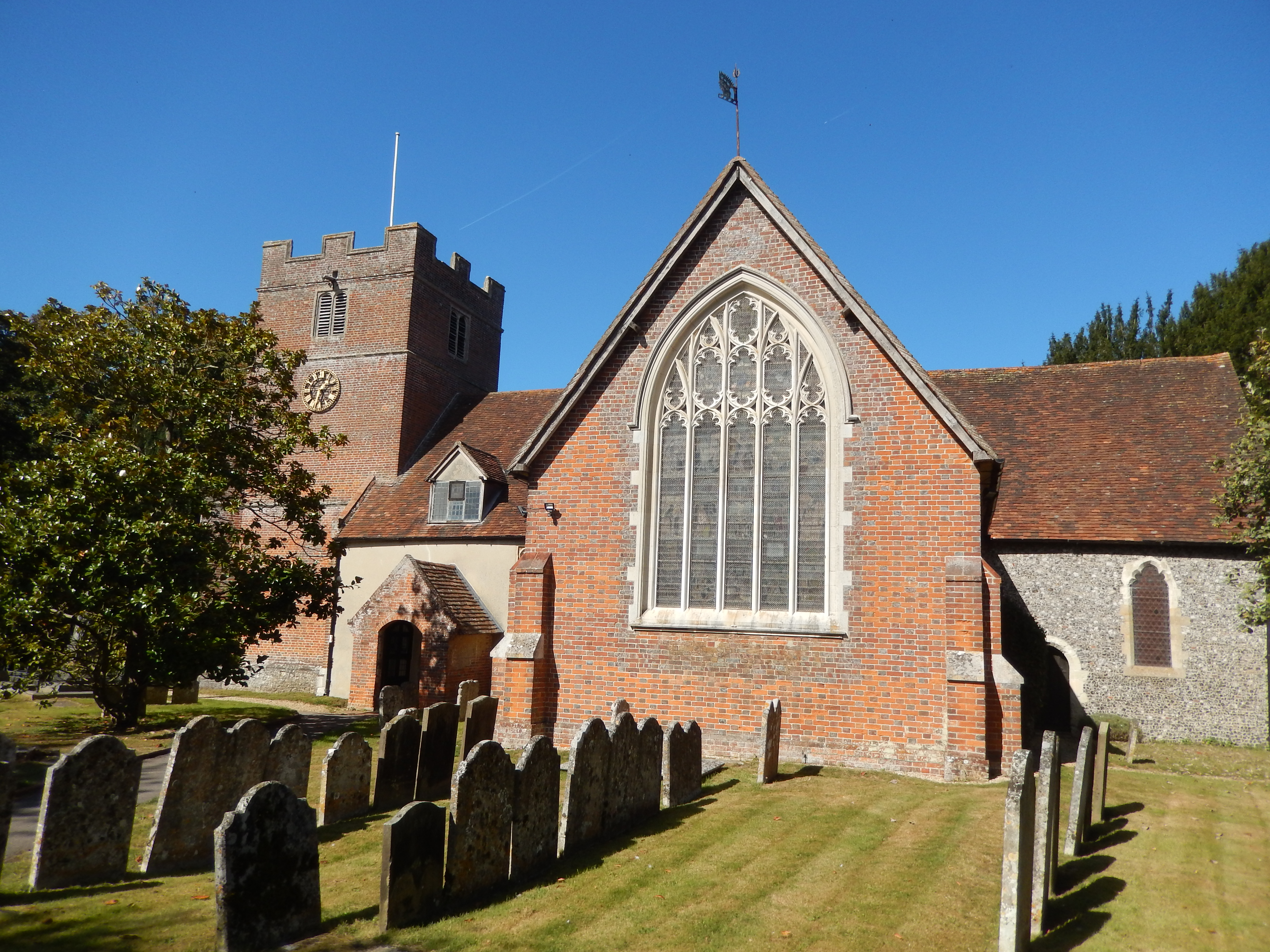
- St. James' church, the parish church for Bramley

- Location within Hampshire
- Population: 5,875; 4,233 (2011 Census)
- OS grid reference: SU655593
- Civil parish: Bramley
- District: Basingstoke and Deane
- Shire county: Hampshire
- Region: South East
- Country: England
- Sovereign state: United Kingdom
- Post town: TADLEY
- Postcode district: RG26
- Dialling code: 01256
- Police: Hampshire and Isle of Wight
- Fire: Hampshire and Isle of Wight
- Ambulance: South Central
- UK Parliament: North East Hampshire

Bramley is a village and parish in Hampshire, England. In the 2001 census it had a population of 3,348. It has a village shop, bakery, estate agency, pub (The Bramley Inn, opened in 1897 as The Six Bells) and a railway station. Also, Bramley Camp houses an Army facility where military training and manoeuvres take place.

== History ==
Evidence of Bramley's first inhabitants can be found in Bullsdown Camp, a prehistoric settlement, where remnants of flint-scrapers, a spear-head, a core and flint-flakes have been found. This is thought to be a late Celtic "triple-walled dun". This fortification can still be seen today, situated to the east of the village south of the Bramley to Sherfield road.

The Romans occupied Calleva Atrebatum and built a walled city known today as Silchester. Bramley is on the Chichester to Silchester Way Roman road and has remains of a Romano-British villa nearby.

Bramley is listed as a significant settlement in the 1086 Domesday Survey, with 39 households, in the hundred of Basingstoke. Included in its resources were two mills, a church and woodlands, ploughlands and meadows with a total value of £9.

The Reverend Robert Toogood wrote a history of the village and church. It includes some anecdotes about King Henry VIII's connections with the village and Cufaude Manor.

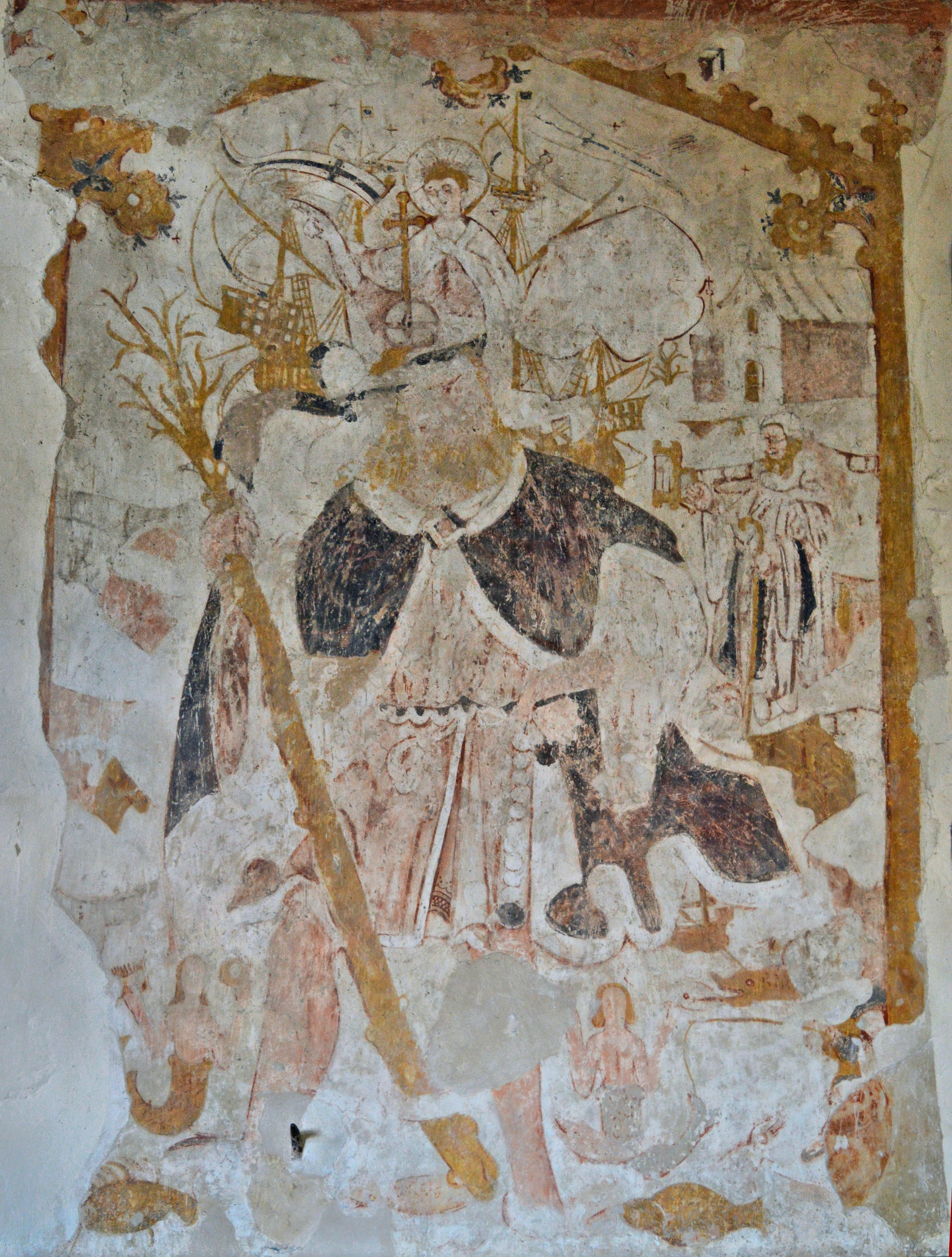

The Church of St James stands at the west of the village and originally dates from 1160, however it features many historical alterations and additions up to the 20th Century. It is a Grade I listed building. St James' church, Bramley, Hampshire. Within the church, images were uncovered which dated back to the pre-Reformation. The famous physicist Lise Meitner is buried in the burial ground next to the church, near the grave of her brother Walter.

The railway line between Reading and Basingstoke was built through the village in 1848. The village had to wait another 47 years until on 1 May 1895 a station in the village opened, at the insistence of the then Duke of Wellington, a prominent landowner in the area. Parts of the 1935 film The Last Journey were shot on the railway within the village.

== Geography ==
Bramley is located ten miles (16 km) south of the large town of Reading, and five miles (8 km) north of Basingstoke. The village is the site of Bramley (Hants) railway station, on the line between Reading and Basingstoke, and is served by Great Western Railway's local services. The station is 5 miles (8 km) north of Basingstoke.

== Governance ==
The civil parish of Bramley includes the village of Bramley and the neighbouring settlements of Bramley Green and Bramley Corner. The village is also part of the Bramley and Sherfield ward of Basingstoke and Deane borough council. The borough council is a Non-metropolitan district of Hampshire County Council. All three councils are responsible for different aspects of local government.

At Borough level, Bramley is represented by Councillors Nicholas Robinson and Venetia Rowland who, together, represent the Bramley and Sherfield Ward.

At County level, Bramley is represented by Keith Chapman, who represents the Calleva and Kingsclere Division.

== Army training area ==
Bramley Camp is a military training area south of the village, used mainly by 21 SAS (reserves). The camp has also been used to shoot parts of the Channel 4 television series Scrapheap Challenge, and the ITV1 series Midsomer Murders. Because the 900-acre (360 ha) site is not open to the public and in many ways is undisturbed; it is a valuable haven for wildlife, being home to badgers, deer and pheasant.
