= North East Hampshire =

UK Parliament constituency (since 1997)

Coordinates: 51.28°N 0.96°W

- County constituency for the House of Commons
- Boundaries since 2024
- Boundary of North East Hampshire in South East England
- County: Hampshire
- Electorate: 73,306 (2023)
- Major settlements: Fleet; Church Crookham; Hook; Yateley (part)

Current constituency
- Created: 1997
- Member of Parliament: Alex Brewer (Liberal Democrats)
- Seats: One
- Created from: East Hampshire; Aldershot; Basingstoke

North East Hampshire is a constituency (Note: A county constituency (for the purposes of election expenses and type of returning officer)) represented in the House of Commons of the UK Parliament by Alex Brewer, a Liberal Democrat. (Note: As with all constituencies, the constituency elects one Member of Parliament (MP) by the first past the post system of election at least every five years.)

== Constituency profile ==
North East Hampshire is a constituency in Hampshire in South East England covering the towns, villages and rural areas to the east of Basingstoke. Its largest town is Fleet, which has a population of around 40,000. Other settlements include the Basingstoke neighbourhood of Lychpit, the western half of the town of Yateley and the villages of Old Basing, Hook, Hartley Wintney, Bramley and Odiham.

Fleet is a wealthy commuter town, mostly developed during the 20th century, with a high proportion of large, detached houses. The South West Main Line and the M3 motorway connect the town to London, which is located around 35 miles (56 km) to the north-east. The constituency contains military sites at Bramley Training Area and RAF Odiham. North East Hampshire is highly affluent, with the House of Commons Library ranking it as the second least-deprived out of 543 constituencies in England. House prices here are higher than the rest of South East England and considerably higher than the national average.

North East Hampshire has an above-average proportion of older working-age adults and retirees and a low proportion of young adults. In general, residents are well-educated and have high rates of homeownership. Household income is very high and the child poverty rate is less than one-third the UK-wide figure. A high proportion of residents work in professional occupations, with many in the business administration and science sectors, and the percentage claiming unemployment benefits is very low. White people made up 93% of the population at the 2021 census.

At the local council level, much of the constituency—including Fleet—is represented by independent or localist councillors. The rural parts of the constituency elected mostly Conservatives and Yateley is represented by Liberal Democrats. An estimated 54% of voters in North East Hampshire supported remaining in the European Union in the 2016 referendum, higher than the UK-wide figure of 48%.

== History ==
The constituency was created in 1997 from parts of the seats of Aldershot and East Hampshire. It was represented at Westminster by James Arbuthnot until 2015 when he was succeeded by Ranil Jayawardena. The constituency has, since its creation, given large majorities to the Conservatives, and in 2015, Jayawardena was elected with a lead of 29,916 votes, or 55.4%. This made North East Hampshire the safest Conservative seat at that election in both percentage and numerical terms. Nevertheless, at the 2024 General Election the seat was gained by the Liberal Democrats with a swing of over 20%.

== Boundaries ==
Map of 2010–2024 boundaries

1997–2010: The District of Hart wards of Church Crookham, Crondall, Eversley, Fleet Courtmoor, Fleet Pondtail, Fleet West, Hartley Wintney, Hook, Long Sutton, Odiham, and Whitewater, and the District of East Hampshire wards of Binsted, Bramshott and Liphook, Froyle and Bentley, Grayshott, Headley, Selborne, Whitehill Bordon and Whitehill, and Whitehill Lindford.

2010–2024: The District of Hart wards of Church Crookham East, Church Crookham West, Crondall, Eversley, Fleet Central, Fleet Courtmoor, Fleet North, Fleet Pondtail, Fleet West, Greywell, Hartley Wintney, Hook, Long Sutton, Odiham, Yateley East, Yateley North, and Yateley West, and the Borough of Basingstoke and Deane wards of Calleva, Pamber, Sherborne St John, and Upton Grey and The Candovers.

This constituency was slightly altered for the 2010 general election. The seat's southernmost part was transferred to East Hampshire while it gained some wards from Basingstoke and additional Hart wards from Aldershot.

2024–present: Further to the 2023 periodic review of Westminster constituencies which came into effect for the 2024 general election, the constituency is composed of the following (as they existed on 1 December 2020):

- The Borough of Basingstoke and Deane wards of: Basing & Upton Grey; Bramley.
- The District of Hart wards of: Crookham East; Crookham West and Ewshot; Fleet Central; Fleet East; Fleet West; Hartley Wintney; Hook; Odiham; Yateley West.

Revised boundaries largely arising from changes to local authority ward structures and population growth since the previous review. The constituency lost its westernmost villages and part of Yateley, while gaining Old Basing.

Towns and villages in the constituency include Bramley, Church Crookham, Elvetham Heath, Eversley, Ewshot, Fleet, Greywell, Hartley Wintney, Herriard, Hook, Odiham, Old Basing, Sherfield on Loddon, Silchester, Upton Grey and Yateley (west).

== Members of Parliament ==
East Hampshire and Aldershot prior to 1997

Election	Member	Party
1997	James Arbuthnot	Conservative
2015	Ranil Jayawardena	Conservative
2024	Alex Brewer	Liberal Democrats

== Elections ==
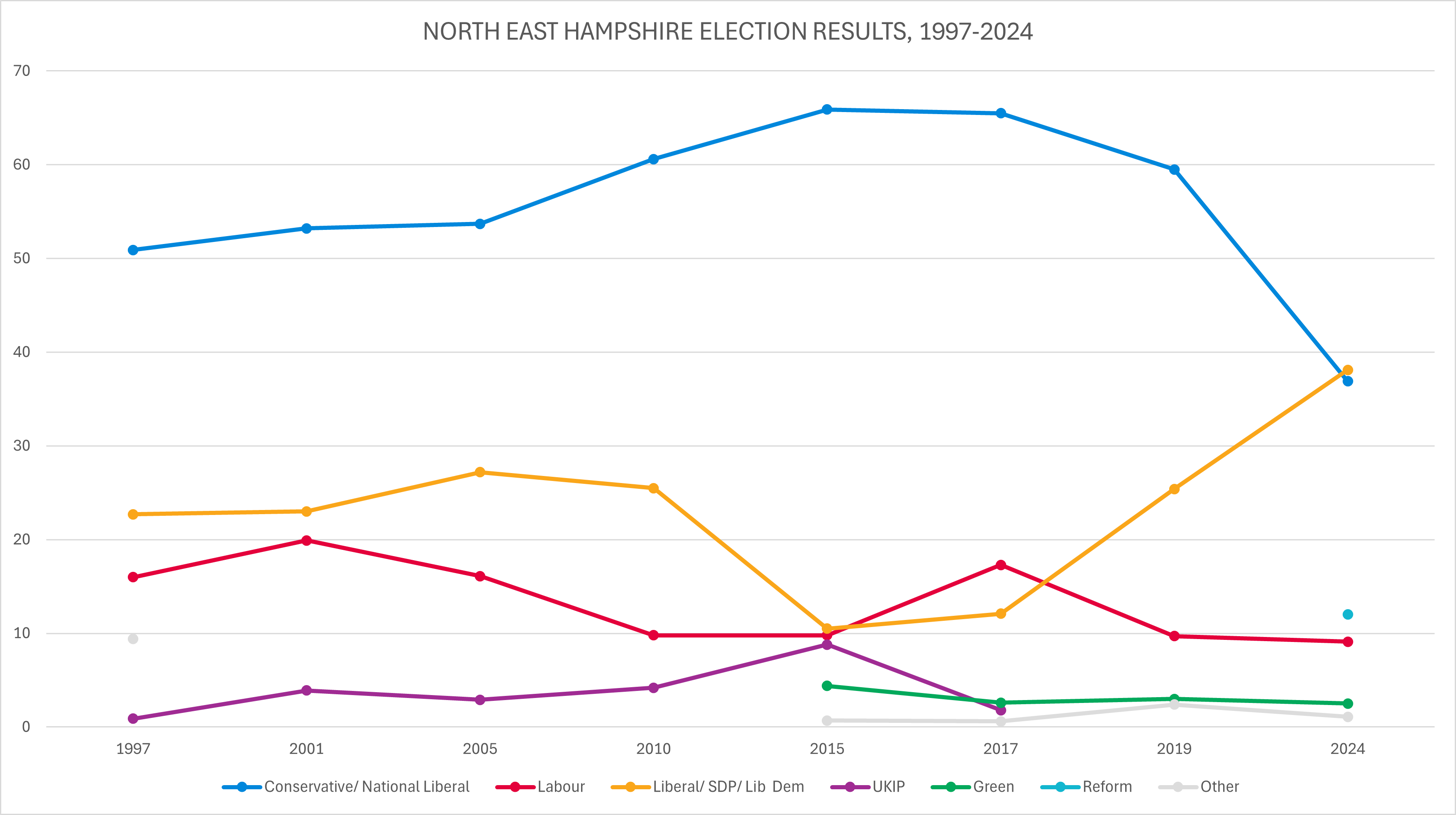
Election results 1997-2024

=== Elections in the 2020s ===
General election 2024: North East Hampshire
Party	Candidate	Votes	%	±%
Liberal Democrats	Alex Brewer	21,178	38.1	+15.7
Conservative	Ranil Jayawardena	20,544	36.9	−24.9
Reform	Paul Morton	6,673	12.0	N/A
Labour	Bradley Phillips	5,057	9.1	−1.1
Green	Mohamed Miah	1,425	2.5	−0.4
Monster Raving Loony	Howling Laud Hope	340	0.6	−0.4
Hampshire Ind.	Duncan Stone	274	0.4	N/A
Libertarian	Alex Zychowski	69	0.1	N/A
Majority		634	1.1	
Turnout		55,560	72.4	−5.0
Registered electors		76,975		
Liberal Democrats gain from Conservative		Swing	+20.3	

=== Elections in the 2010s ===
2019 national result
Party	Vote	%
Conservative	35,124	61.9
Liberal Democrats	12,691	22.4
Labour	5,808	10.2
Green	1,700	3.0
Others	1,407	2.5
Turnout	56,730	77.4
Electorate	73,306	

General election 2019: North East Hampshire
Party	Candidate	Votes	%	±%
Conservative	Ranil Jayawardena	35,280	59.5	−6.0
Liberal Democrats	Graham Cockarill	15,069	25.4	+13.3
Labour	Barry Jones	5,760	9.7	−7.6
Green	Culann Walsh	1,754	3.0	+0.4
Independent	Tony Durrant	831	1.4	N/A
Monster Raving Loony	Howling Laud Hope	576	1.0	N/A
Majority		20,211	34.1	−14.1
Turnout		59,270	75.1	−2.2
Conservative hold		Swing	−9.6	

General election 2017: North East Hampshire
Party	Candidate	Votes	%	±%
Conservative	Ranil Jayawardena	37,754	65.5	−0.4
Labour	Barry Jones	9,982	17.3	+7.5
Liberal Democrats	Graham Cockarill	6,987	12.1	+1.6
Green	Chas Spradbery	1,476	2.6	−1.8
UKIP	Mike Gascoigne	1,061	1.8	−7.0
Independent	Robert Blay	367	0.6	N/A
Majority		27,772	48.2	−7.2
Turnout		57,627	76.3	+3.4
Conservative hold		Swing	−3.95	

General election 2015: North East Hampshire
Party	Candidate	Votes	%	±%
Conservative	Ranil Jayawardena	35,573	65.9	+5.3
Liberal Democrats	Graham Cockarill	5,657	10.5	−15.0
Labour	Amran Hussain	5,290	9.8	0.0
UKIP	Robert Blay^{1}	4,732	8.8	+4.6
Green	Andrew Johnston	2,364	4.4	N/A
Monster Raving Loony	Mad Max Bobetsky	384	0.7	N/A
Majority		29,916	55.4	+20.3
Turnout		54,000	72.9	−0.4
Conservative hold		Swing	+10.15	

^{1}: After nominations were closed, Blay was suspended from UKIP after threatening to shoot his Conservative opponent. His name still appeared on ballot papers as it was too late to remove him.

General election 2010: North East Hampshire
Party	Candidate	Votes	%	±%
Conservative	James Arbuthnot	32,075	60.6	+7.5
Liberal Democrats	Denzil Coulson	13,478	25.5	−1.6
Labour	Barry Jones	5,173	9.8	−6.8
UKIP	Ruth Duffin	2,213	4.2	+0.9
Majority		18,597	35.1	+8.6
Turnout		52,939	73.3	+8.5
Conservative hold		Swing	+4.55	

=== Elections in the 2000s ===
General election 2005: North East Hampshire
Party	Candidate	Votes	%	±%
Conservative	James Arbuthnot	25,407	53.7	+0.5
Liberal Democrats	Adam Carew	12,858	27.2	+4.2
Labour	Kevin McGrath	7,630	16.1	−3.8
UKIP	Paul Birch	1,392	2.9	−1.0
Majority		12,549	26.5	−3.7
Turnout		47,287	64.8	+3.2
Conservative hold		Swing	−1.8	

General election 2001: North East Hampshire
Party	Candidate	Votes	%	±%
Conservative	James Arbuthnot	23,379	53.2	+2.3
Liberal Democrats	Michael Plummer	10,122	23.0	+0.3
Labour	Barry Jones	8,744	19.9	+3.9
UKIP	Graham Mellstrom	1,702	3.9	+3.0
Majority		13,257	30.2	+2.0
Turnout		43,947	61.6	−12.0
Conservative hold		Swing	+1.0	

=== Elections in the 1990s ===
General election 1997: North East Hampshire
Party	Candidate	Votes	%	±%
Conservative	James Arbuthnot	26,017	50.9	
Liberal Democrats	Ian Mann	11,619	22.7	
Labour	Peter Dare	8,203	16.0	
Referendum	Winston Rees	2,420	4.7	
Independent	Keki Jessavala	2,400	4.7	
UKIP	Christopher Berry	452	0.9	
Majority		14,398	28.2	
Turnout		51,111	73.6	
Conservative win (new seat)				

== See also ==
- List of parliamentary constituencies in Hampshire
- List of parliamentary constituencies in the South East England (region)

== Sources ==
- Election result, 2005 (BBC)
- Election results, 1997 - 2001 (BBC)
- Election results, 1997 - 2001 (Election Demon)
- Election results, 1997 - 2005 (Guardian)
