= Results breakdown of the 2024 United Kingdom general election =

2024 United Kingdom general election
- 4 July 2024
- All 650 seats in the House of Commons; 326 (Note: Given that Sinn Féin MPs do not take their seats and the Speaker and deputies only exercise a casting vote, the number of MPs needed for a majority is, in practice, slightly lower. Sinn Féin won 7 seats, meaning a practical majority requires at least 320 MPs.) seats needed for a majority
- Turnout: 59.8% (▼8.4 pp)
Party	Leader	Vote %	Seats	+/–
Labour	Keir Starmer	33.7	411	+209
Conservative	Rishi Sunak	23.7	121	−244
Liberal Democrats	Ed Davey	12.2	72	+61
SNP	John Swinney	2.5	9	−39
Sinn Féin	Mary Lou McDonald	0.7	7	0
Reform	Nigel Farage	14.3	5	+5
DUP	Gavin Robinson	0.6	5	−3
Green	Carla Denyer; Adrian Ramsay	6.4	4	+3
Plaid Cymru	Rhun ap Iorwerth	0.7	4	0
SDLP	Colum Eastwood	0.3	2	0
Alliance	Naomi Long	0.4	1	0
UUP	Doug Beattie	0.3	1	+1
TUV	Jim Allister	0.2	1	+1
This lists parties that won seats. See the complete results below.
Prime Minister before	Appointed Prime Minister
Rishi Sunak; Conservative	Keir Starmer; Labour

This is the results breakdown of the 2024 general election on 4 July 2024.

== Vote share ==
Pending

== Results by affiliation ==
Affiliate	Leader	MPs		Aggregate votes	
Affiliate	Leader		Of total		Of total
Labour Party	Keir Starmer	411 (Note: Includes 43 MPs sponsored by the Co-operative Party, who are designated Labour and Co-operative.)	63.2%	9,704,655	33.7%
Conservative Party	Rishi Sunak	121	18.6%	6,827,311	23.7%
Liberal Democrats	Ed Davey	72	11.1%	3,519,199	12.2%
Scottish National Party	John Swinney	9	1.4%	724,758	2.5%
Sinn Féin	Mary Lou McDonald	7	1.1%	210,891	0.7%
Independent	—N/a	6	0.9%	564,243	2.0%
Reform UK	Nigel Farage	5	0.8%	4,117,221	14.3%
Democratic Unionist Party	Gavin Robinson	5	0.8%	172,058	0.6%
Green Party of England and Wales	Carla Denyer; Adrian Ramsay	4	0.6%	1,841,888	6.4%
Plaid Cymru	Rhun ap Iorwerth	4	0.6%	194,811	0.7%
Social Democratic and Labour Party	Colum Eastwood	2	0.3%	86,861	0.3%
Alliance Party of Northern Ireland	Naomi Long	1	0.2%	117,191	0.4%
Ulster Unionist Party	Doug Beattie	1	0.2%	94,779	0.3%
Traditional Unionist Voice	Jim Allister	1	0.2%	48,685	0.2%
Speaker	Lindsay Hoyle	1	0.2%	25,238	0.1%

Results of the July 2024 general election to the House of Commons of the United Kingdom
Affiliate	Leader	Candidates	MPs					Aggregate votes		
Affiliate	Leader	Candidates	Total	Gained (Note: Notional gains and loses in accordance with Thrasher and Railings calculations)	Lost	Net	Of total (%)	Total	Of total (%)	Change (%)
Labour	Keir Starmer	631 (Note: Includes 44 Co-operative Party candidates, as part of the Labour-Co-op alliance)	411 (Note: Includes 43 Co-operative Party MPs, as part of the Labour-Co-op alliance)	218 (Note: Includes 17 Co-operative Party MPs, as part of the Labour-Co-op alliance)	7	▲211 (Note: Includes ▲17 Co-operative Party MPs, as part of the Labour-Co-op alliance)	63.2 (Note: Includes 6.6% for the Co-operative Party, as part of the Labour-Co-op alliance)	9,708,716 (Note: Includes 805,340 for the Co-operative Party, as part of the Labour-Co-op alliance)	33.70 (Note: Includes 2.78% for the Co-operative Party, as part of the Labour-Co-op alliance)	▲1.6 (Note: Includes ▼0.4% for the Co-operative Party, as part of the Labour-Co-op alliance)
Conservative	Rishi Sunak	635	121	1	252	▼251	18.6	6,828,925	23.70	▼19.9
Reform	Nigel Farage	609	5	5	0	▲5	0.8	4,117,620	14.29	▲12.3
Liberal Democrats	Ed Davey	630	72	64	0	▲64	11.1	3,519,143	12.22	▲0.7
Green Party of England and Wales	Carla Denyer & Adrian Ramsay	574	4	3	0	▲3	0.6	1,841,888	6.39	▲3.8
Scottish National Party	John Swinney	57	9	1	40	▼39	1.4	724,758	2.52	▼1.3
Independents	—N/a	459	6	6	0	▲6	0.9	564,243	1.96	▲1.4
Sinn Féin	Mary Lou McDonald	14	7	0	0	Steady	1.1	210,891	0.73	▲0.1
Workers Party	George Galloway	152	0	New			0.0	210,194	0.73	New
Plaid Cymru	Rhun ap Iorwerth	32	4	2	0	▲2	0.6	194,811	0.68	▲0.2
Democratic Unionist	Gavin Robinson	16	5	0	3	▼3	0.8	172,058	0.60	▼0.2
Alliance	Naomi Long	18	1	1	1	Steady	0.2	117,191	0.41	Steady
Ulster Unionist	Doug Beattie	17	1	1	0	▲1	0.2	94,779	0.33	Steady
Scottish Greens	Patrick Harvie & Lorna Slater	44	0	0	0	Steady	0.0	92,685	0.32	▲0.2
Social Democratic & Labour	Colum Eastwood	18	2	0	0	Steady	0.3	86,861	0.30	▼0.1
Traditional Unionist Voice	Jim Allister	14	1	Did not stand in 2019			0.1	48,685	0.17	—N/a
Social Democratic Party	William Clouston	122	0	0	0	Steady	0.0	33,811	0.12	▲0.1
Speaker (Note: Incumbent Speaker Sir Lindsay Hoyle left the Labour Party in 2019 after he was elected Speaker by the House of Commons; his seat of Chorley was not contested by most major parties.)	Lindsay Hoyle	1	1	0	0	Steady	0.1	25,238	0.09	Steady
Yorkshire Party	Bob Buxton & Simon Biltcliffe	27	0	0	0	Steady	0.0	17,227	0.06	Steady
Independent Network	Marianne Overton	5	0	Did not stand in 2019			0.0	13,663	0.05	—N/a
Trade Unionist & Socialist	Dave Nellist	40	0	Did not stand in 2019			0.0	12,562	0.04	—N/a
Alba	Alex Salmond	19	0	New			0.0	11,784	0.04	New
Rejoin EU	Brendan Donnelly	26	0	New			0.0	9,245	0.03	New
Green Party (NI)	Mal O'Hara	11	0	0	0	Steady	0.0	8,692	0.03	Steady
People Before Profit	Collective leadership (Note: Eamonn McCann is listed as the party's leader in Northern Ireland for the purposes of registration to the UK Electoral Commission. Electoral Commission registration)	3	0	0	0	Steady	0.0	8,438	0.03	Steady
Aontú	Peadar Tóibín	10	0	0	0	Steady	0.0	7,466	0.03	Steady
Newham Independents Party	Mehmood Mirza	1	0	New			0.0	7,180	0.02	New
Heritage Party	David Kurten	41	0	New			0.0	6,597	0.02	New
UK Independence Party	Nick Tenconi (interim)	24	0	0	0	Steady	0.0	6,530	0.02	▼0.1
Liberal Party	Steve Radford	12	0	0	0	Steady	0.0	6,375	0.02	Steady
Ashfield Independents	Jason Zadrozny	1	0	0	0	Steady	0.0	6,276	0.02	Steady
Monster Raving Loony	Howling Laud Hope	22	0	0	0	Steady	0.0	5,814	0.02	Steady
Christian Peoples Alliance	Sidney Cordle	22	0	0	0	Steady	0.0	5,604	0.02	Steady
Scottish Family	Richard Lucas	16	0	0	0	Steady	0.0	5,425	0.02	Steady
English Democrats	Robin Tilbrook	15	0	0	0	Steady	0.0	5,182	0.02	Steady
Party of Women	Kellie-Jay Keen	16	0	New			0.0	5,077	0.02	New
Lincolnshire Independents	Marianne Overton	2	0	0	0	Steady	0.0	4,277	0.01	Steady
One Leicester	Rita Patel	2	0	New			0.0	4,008	0.01	New
Socialist Labour Party	Jim McDaid	12	0	0	0	Steady	0.0	3,609	0.01	Steady
Liverpool Community Independents	Alan Gibbons	1	0	New			0.0	3,293	0.01	New
Swale Independents	Mike Baldock	1	0	Did not stand in 2019			0.0	3,238	0.01	—N/a
Hampshire Independents	Alan Stone	10	0	New			0.0	2,872	0.01	New
Communist Party of Britain	Robert Griffiths	14	0	Did not stand in 2019			0.0	2,622	0.01	—N/a
Democracy for Chorley	Ben Holden-Crowther	1	0	New			0.0	2,424	0.01	New
Independent Oxford Alliance	Anne Gwinett	1	0	New			0.0	2,381	0.01	New
Climate Party	Edmund Gemmell	13	0	New			0.0	1,967	0.01	New
South Devon Alliance	Richard Daws	1	0	New			0.0	1,924	0.01	New
British Democratic Party	James Lewthwaite	4	0	Did not stand in 2019			0.0	1,860	0.01	—N/a
True and Fair Party	Gina Miller	4	0	Did not stand in 2019			0.0	1,695	0.01	—N/a
Alliance for Democracy and Freedom	Teck Khong	9	0	New			0.0	1,586	0.01	New
North East Party	Brian Moore	1	0	0	0	Steady	0.0	1,581	0.01	Steady
English Constitution Party	Graham Moore	4	0	New			0.0	1,563	0.01	New
Abolish the Welsh Assembly Party	Richard Suchorzewski	3	0	Did not stand in 2019			0.0	1,521	0.01	—N/a
Animal Welfare Party	Vanessa Hudson	4	0	0	0	Steady	0.0	1,486	0.01	Steady
Consensus	Ian Berkeley-Hurst	1	0	New			0.0	1,289	0.00	New
Women's Equality Party	Mandu Reid	4	0	0	0	Steady	0.0	1,275	0.00	Steady
Workers Revolutionary Party	Joshua Ogunleye	5	0	0	0	Steady	0.0	1,190	0.00	Steady
Kingston Independent Residents Group	Yvonne Tracey	1	0	New			0.0	1,177	0.00	New
Propel	Neil McEvoy	1	0	New			0.0	1,041	0.00	New
Scottish Socialist Party	Colin Fox & Natalie Reid	2	0	Did not stand in 2019			0.0	1,007	0.00	—N/a
Independent Alliance (Kent)	Francis Michael Taylor	1	0	New			0.0	926	0.00	New
Freedom Alliance	Catherine Evans	5	0	New			0.0	895	0.00	New
Christian Party	Jeff Green	2	0	Coalition with CPA in 2019			0.0	806	0.00	—N/a
Confelicity	James Miller	2	0	New			0.0	750	0.00	New
Portsmouth Independents Party	Brian Moore	1	0	New			0.0	733	0.00	New
Independence for Scotland Party	Colette Walker	2	0	New			0.0	678	0.00	New
Shared Ground	Thomas Hall	2	0	New			0.0	664	0.00	New
Cross-Community Labour Alternative	Owen McCracken	1	0	Did not stand in 2019			0.0	624	0.00	—N/a
British Unionist Party	John Ferguson	2	0	New			0.0	614	0.00	New
Transform	Anwarul Khan	2	0	New			0.0	595	0.00	New
Putting Crewe First	Brian Silvester	1	0	New			0.0	588	0.00	New
Scottish Libertarian Party	Tam Laird	4	0	0	0	Steady	0.0	536	0.00	Steady
Peace Party	John Morris	2	0	0	0	Steady	0.0	531	0.00	Steady
Taking the Initiative Party	Nicola Zingwari	1	0	Did not stand in 2019			0.0	503	0.00	—N/a
Parties with fewer than 500 votes each		51	0	N/A			0.0	5,719	0.02	N/A
Blank and invalid votes								116,063	—	—
Total		4,515	650			0	100.0	28,809,340	100.00	0.0
Registered voters, and turnout								48,224,212	59.74	−7.78

== Incumbents not re-elected ==
Party	Name	Constituency	Office held whilst in Parliament	Year elected	Seat held by party since	Defeated by	Party
Conservative	Bim Afolami	Hitchin (Note: Originally elected for Hitchin and Harpenden.)	Economic Secretary to the Treasury	2017	1997	Alistair Strathern	Labour
Conservative	Peter Aldous	Lowestoft (Note: Originally elected for Waveney.)		2010	2010	Jessica Asato	Labour
Conservative	Caroline Ansell	Eastbourne		2019	2019	Josh Babarinde	Liberal Democrats
Conservative	Sarah Atherton	Wrexham	Parliamentary Under-Secretary of State for Defence People, Veterans and Service Families (2022)	2019	2019	Andrew Ranger	Labour
Conservative	Shaun Bailey	Tipton and Wednesbury (Note: Originally elected for West Bromwich West.)		2019	2019	Antonia Bance	Labour
Conservative	Siobhan Baillie	Stroud		2019	2019	Simon Opher	Labour
Conservative	Duncan Baker	North Norfolk		2019	2019	Steffan Aquarone	Liberal Democrats
Conservative	Steve Baker	Wycombe	Minister of State at the Cabinet Office	2010	1951	Emma Reynolds	Labour
Conservative	Simon Baynes	North Shropshire (Note: Originally elected for Clwyd South.)	Parliamentary Under-Secretary of State for Justice and Tackling Illegal Migration (2022)	2019	2019	Helen Morgan	Liberal Democrats
Conservative	Jake Berry	Rossendale and Darwen	Chairman of the Conservative Party (2022)	2010	2010	Andy MacNae	Labour
Conservative	Peter Bottomley	Worthing West	Father of the House	1975	1997	Beccy Cooper	Labour
Conservative	Ben Bradley	Mansfield		2017	2017	Steve Yemm	Labour
Conservative	Jack Brereton	Stoke-on-Trent South		2017	2017	Allison Gardner	Labour
Conservative	Paul Bristow	Peterborough		2019	2019	Andrew Pakes	Labour
Conservative	Sara Britcliffe	Hyndburn	Deputy Chairman of the Conservative Party	2019	2019	Sarah Smith	Labour
Conservative	Anthony Browne	St Neots and Mid Cambridgeshire (Note: Originally elected for South Cambridgeshire.)	Parliamentary Under-Secretary of State for Decarbonisation and Technology	2019	1997	Ian Sollom	Liberal Democrats
Conservative	Fiona Bruce	Congleton	Prime Minister's Special Envoy for Freedom of Religion or Belief	2010	1983	Sarah Russell	Labour
Conservative	Felicity Buchan	Kensington and Bayswater (Note: Originally elected for Kensington.)	Parliamentary Under-Secretary of State for Housing and Homelessness	2019	2019	Joe Powell	Labour
Conservative	Robert Buckland	Swindon South	Chair of the Northern Ireland Affairs Select Committee; Secretary of State for Wales (2022); Secretary of State for Justice (2019–22)	2010	2010	Heidi Alexander	Labour
Conservative	Conor Burns	Bournemouth West	Minister of State for Trade Policy (2022)	2010	1950	Jessica Toale	Labour
Conservative	Rob Butler	Aylesbury	Parliamentary Under-Secretary of State for Prisons and Probation (2022)	2019	1924	Laura Kyrke-Smith	Labour
Conservative	Alun Cairns	Vale of Glamorgan	Secretary of State for Wales (2016–2019)	2010	2010	Kanishka Narayan	Labour
Conservative	Andy Carter	Warrington South		2019	2019	Sarah Hall	Labour
Conservative	Miriam Cates	Penistone and Stocksbridge		2019	2019	Marie Tidball	Labour
Conservative	Maria Caulfield	Lewes	Parliamentary Under-Secretary of State for Mental Health and Women's Health Strategy	2015	2015	James MacCleary	Liberal Democrats
Conservative	Alex Chalk	Cheltenham	Secretary of State for Justice	2015	2015	Max Wilkinson	Liberal Democrats
Conservative	Rehman Chishti	Gillingham and Rainham	Parliamentary Under-Secretary of State for North America, Sanctions and Consular Policy (2022)	2010	2010	Naushabah Khan	Labour
Conservative	Simon Clarke	Middlesbrough South and East Cleveland	Secretary of State for Levelling Up, Housing and Communities (2022)	2017	2017	Luke Myer	Labour
Conservative	Theo Clarke	Stafford		2019	2010	Leigh Ingham	Labour
Conservative	Brendan Clarke-Smith	Bassetlaw	Deputy Chairman of the Conservative Party (2023–2024)	2019	2019	Jo White	Labour
Conservative	Chris Clarkson	Stratford-on-Avon (Note: Originally elected for Heywood and Middleton.)		2019	2019	Manuela Perteghella	Liberal Democrats
Conservative	Thérèse Coffey	Suffolk Coastal	Deputy Prime Minister (2022)	2010	1983	Jenny Riddell-Carpenter	Labour
Conservative	Elliot Colburn	Carshalton and Wallington		2019	2019	Bobby Dean	Liberal Democrats
Conservative	Damian Collins	Folkestone and Hythe	Parliamentary Under-Secretary of State for Tech and the Digital Economy (2022)	2010	1950	Tony Vaughan	Labour
Conservative	Robert Courts	Witney	Solicitor General for England and Wales	2016	1983	Charlie Maynard	Liberal Democrats
Conservative	Stephen Crabb	Mid and South Pembrokeshire (Note: Originally elected for Preseli Pembrokeshire.)	Chair of the Welsh Affairs Select Committee	2005	2005	Henry Tufnell	Labour
Conservative	Virginia Crosbie	Ynys Môn		2019	2019	Llinos Medi	Plaid Cymru
Conservative	James Daly	Bury North	Deputy Chairman of the Conservative Party	2019	2019	James Frith	Labour
Conservative	David TC Davies	Monmouthshire (Note: Originally elected for Monmouth.)	Secretary of State for Wales	2005	2005	Catherine Fookes	Labour
Conservative	James Davies	Clwyd East (Note: Originally elected for Vale of Clwyd.)	Parliamentary Under-Secretary of State for Wales (2022–2023)	2019	2019	Becky Gittins	Labour
Conservative	Philip Davies	Shipley		2005	2005	Anna Dixon	Labour
Conservative	Sarah Dines	Derbyshire Dales	Parliamentary Under-Secretary of State for Safeguarding (2022–2023)	2019	2010	John Whitby	Labour
Conservative	Leo Docherty	Aldershot	Minister of State for the Armed Forces	2017	1918	Alex Baker	Labour
Conservative	Michelle Donelan	Melksham and Devizes (Note: Originally elected for Chippenham.)	Secretary of State for Science, Innovation and Technology	2015	2015	Brian Mathew	Liberal Democrats
Conservative	Steve Double	St Austell and Newquay	Lords Commissioners of the Treasury (2022–2023)	2015	2015	Noah Law	Labour
Conservative	Jackie Doyle-Price	Thurrock	Chair of the Public Administration and Constitutional Affairs Select Committee	2010	2010	Jen Craft	Labour
Conservative	Richard Drax	South Dorset		2010	2010	Lloyd Hatton	Labour
Conservative	Flick Drummond	Winchester (Note: Originally elected for Meon Valley.)		2019	2010	Danny Chambers	Liberal Democrats
Conservative	Mark Eastwood	Ossett and Denby Dale (Note: Originally elected for Dewsbury.)		2019	2019	Jade Botterill	Labour
Conservative	Ruth Edwards	Rushcliffe	Assistant Government Whip	2019	1970	James Naish	Labour
Conservative	Tobias Ellwood	Bournemouth East	Chair of the Defence Select Committee (2020–2023)	2005	1974	Tom Hayes	Labour
Conservative	Nigel Evans	Ribble Valley	Chairman of Ways and Means	1992	1992	Maya Ellis	Labour
Conservative	Ben Everitt	Milton Keynes North		2019	2010	Chris Curtis	Labour
Conservative	Michael Fabricant	Lichfield	Lords Commissioners of the Treasury (2010–2012)	1992	1997	Dave Robertson	Labour
Conservative	Laura Farris	Newbury	Parliamentary Under-Secretary of State for Victims and Safeguarding	2019	2005	Lee Dillon	Liberal Democrats
Conservative	Simon Fell	Barrow and Furness		2019	2019	Michelle Scrogham	Labour
Conservative	Anna Firth	Southend West and Leigh (Note: Originally elected for Southend West.)		2022	1950	David Burton-Sampson	Labour
Conservative	Katherine Fletcher	South Ribble	Parliamentary Under-Secretary of State for Women (2022)	2019	2010	Paul Foster	Labour
Conservative	Mark Fletcher	Bolsover		2019	2019	Natalie Fleet	Labour
Conservative	Nick Fletcher	Doncaster East and the Isle of Axholme (Note: Originally elected for Don Valley.)		2019	2019	Lee Pitcher	Labour
Conservative	Vicky Ford	Chelmsford	Minister of State for Development (2022)	2017	2010	Marie Goldman	Liberal Democrats
Conservative	Kevin Foster	Torbay	Minister of State for Transport (2022)	2015	2015	Steve Darling	Liberal Democrats
Conservative	Liam Fox	North Somerset	Secretary of State for International Trade (2016–2019)	1992	2010	Sadik Al-Hassan	Labour
Conservative	Lucy Frazer	Ely and East Cambridgeshire (Note: Originally elected for South West Cambridgeshire.)	Secretary of State for Culture, Media and Sport	2015	1983	Charlotte Cane	Liberal Democrats
Conservative	Marcus Fysh	Yeovil	Parliamentary Under-Secretary of State for Exports (2022)	2015	2015	Adam Dance	Liberal Democrats
Conservative	Peter Gibson	Darlington		2019	2019	Lola McEvoy	Labour
Conservative	Richard Graham	Gloucester		2010	2010	Alex McIntyre	Labour
Conservative	James Gray	South Cotswolds (Note: Originally elected for North Wiltshire.)		1997	1983	Roz Savage	Liberal Democrats
Conservative	Chris Green	Bolton West		2015	2015	Phil Brickell	Labour
Conservative	Damian Green	Ashford	First Secretary of State (2017)	1997	1931	Sojan Joseph	Labour
Conservative	Jonathan Gullis	Stoke-on-Trent North	Deputy Chairman of the Conservative Party	2019	2019	David Williams	Labour
Conservative	Luke Hall	Thornbury and Yate	Minister of State for Skills, Apprenticeships and Higher Education	2015	2015	Claire Young	Liberal Democrats
Conservative	Greg Hands	Chelsea and Fulham	Minister of State for Trade Policy Minister for London	2005	2010	Ben Coleman	Labour
Conservative	Mark Harper	Forest of Dean	Secretary of State for Transport	2005	2005	Matt Bishop	Labour
Conservative	Sally-Ann Hart	Hastings and Rye		2019	2010	Helena Dollimore	Labour
Conservative	Simon Hart	Caerfyrddin (Note: Originally elected for Carmarthen West and South Pembrokeshire.)	Chief Whip of the Conservative Party	2010	2010	Ann Davies	Plaid Cymru
Conservative	Darren Henry	Broxtowe	Assistant Government Whip (2022)	2019	2010	Juliet Campbell	Labour
Conservative	Antony Higginbotham	Burnley		2019	2019	Oliver Ryan	Labour
Conservative	Philip Hollobone	Kettering		2005	2005	Rosie Wrighting	Labour
Conservative	Adam Holloway	Gravesham		2005	2005	Lauren Sullivan	Labour
Conservative	Paul Howell	Newton Aycliffe and Spennymoor (Note: Originally elected for Sedgefield.)		2019	2019	Alan Strickland	Labour
Conservative	Eddie Hughes	Tamworth (Note: Originally elected for Walsall North.)	Parliamentary Under-Secretary of State for Housing and Rough Sleeping (2021–2022)	2017	2017	Sarah Edwards	Labour
Conservative	Jane Hunt	Loughborough	Parliamentary Under-Secretary of State for Enterprise, Markets and Small Business (2022)	2019	2010	Jeevun Sandher	Labour
Conservative	Tom Hunt	Ipswich		2019	2019	Jack Abbott	Labour
Conservative	Ranil Jayawardena	North East Hampshire	Secretary of State for Environment, Food and Rural Affairs (2022)	2015	1997	Alex Brewer	Liberal Democrats
Conservative	Mark Jenkinson	Penrith and Solway (Note: Originally elected for Workington.)	Assistant Government Whip	2019	2019	Markus Campbell-Savours	Labour
Conservative	Andrea Jenkyns	Leeds South West and Morley (Note: Originally elected for Morley and Outwood.)	Parliamentary Under-Secretary of State for Skills, Further and Higher Education (2022)	2015	2015	Mark Sewards	Labour
Conservative	Gareth Johnson	Dartford	Parliamentary Under-Secretary of State for Courts (2022)	2010	2010	Jim Dickson	Labour
Conservative	David Johnston	Didcot and Wantage (Note: Originally elected for Wantage.)	Parliamentary Under-Secretary of State for Children, Families and Wellbeing	2019	1983	Olly Glover	Liberal Democrats
Conservative	Andrew Jones	Harrogate and Knaresborough	Parliamentary Under-Secretary of State for Transport (2018–2019)	2010	2010	Tom Gordon	Liberal Democrats
Conservative	Fay Jones	Brecon, Radnor and Cwm Tawe (Note: Originally elected for Brecon and Radnorshire.)	Parliamentary Under-Secretary of State for Wales	2019	2019	David Chadwick	Liberal Democrats
Conservative	Marcus Jones	Nuneaton	Government Deputy Chief Whip	2010	2010	Jodie Gosling	Labour
Conservative	Simon Jupp	Honiton and Sidmouth (Note: Originally elected for East Devon.)		2019	1997	Richard Foord	Liberal Democrats
Conservative	Daniel Kawczynski	Shrewsbury (Note: Originally elected for Shrewsbury and Atcham.)		2005	2005	Julia Buckley	Labour
Conservative	Gillian Keegan	Chichester	Secretary of State for Education	2017	1924	Jess Brown-Fuller	Liberal Democrats
Conservative	Kate Kniveton	Burton and Uttoxeter		2019	2010	Jacob Collier	Labour
Conservative	Robert Largan	High Peak	Assistant Government Whip	2019	2019	Jon Pearce	Labour
Conservative	Ian Levy	Cramlington and Killingworth (Note: Originally elected for Blyth Valley.)		2019	2019	Emma Foody	Labour
Conservative	Andrew Lewer	Northampton South		2017	2005	Mike Reader	Labour
Conservative	Ian Liddell-Grainger	Tiverton and Minehead (Note: Originally elected for Bridgwater and West Somerset.)		2001	1950	Rachel Gilmour	Liberal Democrats
Conservative	Chris Loder	West Dorset		2019	1885	Edward Morello	Liberal Democrats
Conservative	Marco Longhi	Dudley (Note: Originally elected for Dudley North.)		2019	2019	Sonia Kumar	Labour
Conservative	Jack Lopresti	Filton and Bradley Stoke		2010	2010	Claire Hazelgrove	Labour
Conservative	Jonathan Lord	Woking		2010	1950	Will Forster	Liberal Democrats
Conservative	Cherilyn Mackrory	Truro and Falmouth		2019	2010	Jayne Kirkham	Labour
Conservative	Rachel Maclean	Redditch	Deputy Chairman of the Conservative Party	2017	2010	Chris Bloore	Labour
Conservative	Anthony Mangnall	South Devon (Note: Originally elected for Totnes.)		2019	1997	Caroline Voaden	Liberal Democrats
Conservative	Scott Mann	North Cornwall	Lords Commissioners of the Treasury	2015	2015	Ben Maguire	Liberal Democrats
Conservative	Julie Marson	Hertford and Stortford	Assistant Government Whip (2022–2023)	2019	1983	Josh Dean	Labour
Conservative	Paul Maynard	Blackpool North and Fleetwood (Note: Originally elected for Blackpool North and Cleveleys.)	Parliamentary Under-Secretary of State for Pensions	2010	2010	Lorraine Beavers	Labour
Conservative	Jason McCartney	Colne Valley		2019	2019	Paul Davies	Labour
Conservative	Karl McCartney	Lincoln	Parliamentary Under-Secretary of State for Transport (2022)	2019	2019	Hamish Falconer	Labour
Conservative	Johnny Mercer	Plymouth Moor View	Minister of State for Veterans' Affairs	2015	2015	Fred Thomas	Labour
Conservative	Stephen Metcalfe	South Basildon and East Thurrock		2010	2010	James McMurdock	Reform
Conservative	Robin Millar	Bangor Aberconwy (Note: Originally elected for Aberconwy.)		2019	2010	Claire Hughes	Labour
Conservative	Maria Miller	Basingstoke	Chair of the Women and Equalities Committee (2015–2020)	2005	1924	Luke Murphy	Labour
Conservative	Amanda Milling	Cannock Chase	Lords Commissioners of the Treasury	2015	2010	Josh Newbury	Labour
Conservative	Nigel Mills	Amber Valley		2010	2010	Linsey Farnsworth	Labour
Conservative	Damien Moore	Southport	Assistant Government Whip (2022)	2017	2017	Patrick Hurley	Labour
Conservative	Penny Mordaunt	Portsmouth North	Leader of the House of Commons	2010	2010	Amanda Martin	Labour
Conservative	Anne Marie Morris	Newton Abbot		2010	2010	Martin Wrigley	Liberal Democrats
Conservative	David Morris	Morecambe and Lunesdale		2010	2010	Lizzi Collinge	Labour
Conservative	James Morris	Halesowen (Note: Originally elected for Halesowen and Rowley Regis.)	Parliamentary Under-Secretary of State for Vaccines and Public Health (2022)	2010	2010	Alex Ballinger	Labour
Conservative	Jill Mortimer	Hartlepool		2021	2021	Jonathan Brash	Labour
Conservative	Holly Mumby-Croft	Scunthorpe		2019	2019	Nic Dakin	Labour
Conservative	Sheryll Murray	South East Cornwall		2010	2010	Anna Gelderd	Labour
Conservative	Lia Nici	Great Grimsby and Cleethorpes (Note: Originally elected for Great Grimsby.)	Assistant Government Whip (2022)	2019	2019	Melanie Onn	Labour
Conservative	Guy Opperman	Hexham	Parliamentary Under-Secretary of State for Roads and Local Transport	2010	1924	Joe Morris	Labour
Conservative	John Penrose	Weston-super-Mare	United Kingdom Anti-Corruption Champion	2005	2005	Dan Aldridge	Labour
Conservative	Rebecca Pow	Taunton and Wellington (Note: Originally elected for Taunton Deane.)	Parliamentary Under-Secretary of State for Nature	2015	2015	Gideon Amos	Liberal Democrats
Conservative	Victoria Prentis	Banbury	Attorney General for England and Wales; Advocate General for Northern Ireland	2015	1922	Sean Woodcock	Labour
Conservative	Tom Pursglove	Corby and East Northamptonshire (Note: Originally elected for Corby.)	Minister of State for Legal Migration and the Border	2015	2015	Lee Barron	Labour
Conservative	Jeremy Quin	Horsham	Chair of the Defence Select Committee	2015	1983	John Milne	Liberal Democrats
Conservative	Tom Randall	Gedling		2019	2019	Michael Payne	Labour
Conservative	Jacob Rees-Mogg	North East Somerset and Hanham (Note: Originally elected for North East Somerset.)	Secretary of State for Business, Energy and Industrial Strategy (2022)	2010	2010	Dan Norris	Labour
Conservative	Angela Richardson	Guildford	Deputy Chairman of the Conservative Party	2019	2005	Zöe Franklin	Liberal Democrats
Conservative	Laurence Robertson	Tewkesbury	Chair of the Northern Ireland Affairs Select Committee (2010–2017)	1997	1997	Cameron Thomas	Liberal Democrats
Conservative	Mary Robinson	Cheadle		2015	2015	Tom Morrison	Liberal Democrats
Conservative	Douglas Ross	Aberdeenshire North and Moray East (Note: Originally elected for Moray.)	Leader of the Scottish Conservative and Unionist Party	2017	2017	Seamus Logan	SNP
Conservative	Lee Rowley	North East Derbyshire	Minister of State for Housing, Planning and Building Safety	2017	2017	Louise Jones	Labour
Conservative	Dean Russell	Watford	Parliamentary Under-Secretary of State for Enterprise, Markets and Small Business (2022)	2019	2010	Matt Turmaine	Labour
Conservative	David Rutley	Macclesfield	Parliamentary Under-Secretary of State for Americas, Caribbean and Overseas Territories	2010	1918	Tim Roca	Labour
Conservative	Gary Sambrook	Birmingham Northfield	Executive Secretary of the 1922 Committee	2019	2019	Laurence Turner	Labour
Conservative	Selaine Saxby	North Devon		2019	2015	Ian Roome	Liberal Democrats
Conservative	Bob Seely	Isle of Wight West (Note: Originally elected for Isle of Wight.)		2017	2001	Richard Quigley	Labour
Conservative	Andrew Selous	Dunstable and Leighton Buzzard (Note: Originally elected for South West Bedfordshire.)	Second Church Estates Commissioner	2001	1983	Alex Mayer	Labour
Conservative	Grant Shapps	Welwyn Hatfield	Secretary of State for Defence	2005	2005	Andrew Lewin	Labour
Conservative	Amanda Solloway	Derby North	Parliamentary Under-Secretary of State for Affordability and Skills	2019	2019	Catherine Atkinson	Labour
Conservative	Mark Spencer	Sherwood Forest (Note: Originally elected for Sherwood.)	Minister of State for Food, Farming and Fisheries	2010	2010	Michelle Welsh	Labour
Conservative	Alexander Stafford	Rother Valley	Vice Chairman of the Conservative Party (2022–2023)	2019	2019	Jake Richards	Labour
Conservative	Andrew Stephenson	Pendle and Clitheroe (Note: Originally elected for Pendle.)	Minister of State for Health and Secondary Care	2010	2010	Jonathan Hinder	Labour
Conservative	Jane Stevenson	Wolverhampton North East		2019	2019	Sureena Brackenridge	Labour
Conservative	John Stevenson	Carlisle		2010	2010	Julie Minns	Labour
Conservative	Iain Stewart	Buckingham and Bletchley (Note: Originally elected for Milton Keynes South.)	Chair of the Transport Select Committee	2010	2010	Callum Anderson	Labour
Conservative	Julian Sturdy	York Outer		2010	2010	Luke Charters	Labour
Conservative	James Sunderland	Bracknell		2019	1997	Peter Swallow	Labour
Conservative	Robert Syms	Poole	Lords Commissioners of the Treasury (2016–2017)	1997	1950	Neil Duncan-Jordan	Labour
Conservative	Derek Thomas	St Ives		2015	2015	Andrew George	Liberal Democrats
Conservative	Maggie Throup	Erewash	Parliamentary Under-Secretary of State for Vaccines and Public Health (2021–2022)	2015	2010	Adam Thompson	Labour
Conservative	Kelly Tolhurst	Rochester and Strood	Minister of State for Schools and Childhood (2022)	2015	2015	Lauren Edwards	Labour
Conservative	Justin Tomlinson	Swindon North	Minister of State for Energy Security and Net Zero	2010	2010	Will Stone	Labour
Conservative	Michael Tomlinson	Mid Dorset and North Poole	Minister of State for Countering Illegal Migration	2015	2015	Vikki Slade	Liberal Democrats
Conservative	Craig Tracey	North Warwickshire and Bedworth (Note: Originally elected for North Warwickshire.)		2015	2010	Rachel Taylor	Labour
Conservative	Anne-Marie Trevelyan	North Northumberland (Note: Originally elected for Berwick-upon-Tweed.)	Minister of State for Indo-Pacific	2015	2015	David Smith	Labour
Conservative	Liz Truss	South West Norfolk	Prime Minister (2022)	2010	1964	Terry Jermy	Labour
Conservative	Steve Tuckwell	Uxbridge and South Ruislip		2023	2010	Danny Beales	Labour
Conservative	Shailesh Vara	North West Cambridgeshire	Secretary of State for Northern Ireland (2022)	2005	1983	Sam Carling	Labour
Conservative	Theresa Villiers	Chipping Barnet	Secretary of State for Environment, Food and Rural Affairs (2019–2020)	2005	1974	Dan Tomlinson	Labour
Conservative	Matt Warman	Boston and Skegness	Minister of State for Digital, Culture, Media and Sport (2022)	2015	1997	Richard Tice	Reform
Conservative	Giles Watling	Clacton		2017	2017	Nigel Farage	Reform
Conservative	Suzanne Webb	Stourbridge	Assistant Government Whip	2019	2010	Cat Eccles	Labour
Conservative	Heather Wheeler	South Derbyshire	Parliamentary Secretary for the Cabinet Office (2022)	2010	2010	Samantha Niblett	Labour
Conservative	Bill Wiggin	North Herefordshire		2001	2010	Ellie Chowns	Green
Conservative	Craig Williams	Montgomeryshire and Glyndŵr (Note: Originally elected for Montgomeryshire.)	Parliamentary Private Secretary to the Prime Minister	2019	2010	Steve Witherden	Labour
Conservative	Jacob Young	Redcar	Parliamentary Under-Secretary of State for Levelling Up	2019	2019	Anna Turley	Labour
SNP	Hannah Bardell	Livingston		2015	2015	Gregor Poynton	Labour
SNP	Steven Bonnar	Coatbridge and Bellshill (Note: Originally elected for Coatbridge, Chryston and Bellshill.)	SNP Spokesperson for Environment, Farming, Agriculture and Rural Affairs	2019	2019	Frank McNally	Labour
SNP	Deidre Brock	Edinburgh North and Leith	SNP Spokesperson for Business	2015	2015	Tracy Gilbert	Labour
SNP	Alan Brown	Kilmarnock and Loudoun	SNP Spokesperson for Energy Security and Net Zero (2022–2023)	2015	2015	Lillian Jones	Labour
SNP	Amy Callaghan	Mid Dunbartonshire (Note: Originally elected for East Dunbartonshire.)	SNP Spokesperson for Health	2019	2019	Susan Murray	Liberal Democrats
SNP	Joanna Cherry	Edinburgh South West		2015	2015	Scott Arthur	Labour
SNP	Ronnie Cowan	Inverclyde and Renfrewshire West (Note: Originally elected for Inverclyde.)		2015	2015	Martin McCluskey	Labour
SNP	Martyn Day	Bathgate and Linlithgow (Note: Originally elected for Linlithgow and East Falkirk.)	SNP Spokesperson for Health (2021–2023)	2015	2015	Kirsteen Sullivan	Labour
SNP	Martin Docherty-Hughes	West Dunbartonshire	SNP Spokesperson for Defence	2015	2015	Douglas McAllister	Labour
SNP	Allan Dorans	Ayr, Carrick and Cumnock		2019	2019	Elaine Stewart	Labour
SNP	Marion Fellows	Motherwell, Wishaw and Carluke (Note: Originally elected for Motherwell and Wishaw.)		2015	2015	Pamela Nash	Labour
SNP	Patricia Gibson	North Ayrshire and Arran	SNP Attorney General Spokesperson	2015	2015	Irene Campbell	Labour
SNP	Drew Hendry	Inverness, Skye and West Ross-shire (Note: Originally elected for Inverness, Nairn, Badenoch and Strathspey.)		2015	2015	Angus MacDonald	Liberal Democrats
SNP	David Linden	Glasgow East	SNP Spokesperson for Social Justice	2017	2015	John Grady	Labour
SNP	Stewart McDonald	Glasgow South		2015	2015	Gordon McKee	Labour
SNP	Stuart McDonald	Cumbernauld and Kirkintilloch	SNP Spokesperson for Justice and Immigration (2022–2023)	2015	2015	Katrina Murray	Labour
SNP	Anne McLaughlin	Glasgow North East	SNP Spokesperson for International Development	2019	2019	Maureen Burke	Labour
SNP	Carol Monaghan	Glasgow West (Note: Originally elected for Glasgow North West.)	SNP Spokesperson for Science, Innovation, Technology and Education	2015	2015	Patricia Ferguson	Labour
SNP	Gavin Newlands	Paisley and Renfrewshire North	SNP Spokesperson for Transport	2015	2015	Alison Taylor	Labour
SNP	John Nicolson	Alloa and Grangemouth (Note: Originally elected for Ochil and South Perthshire.)	SNP Spokesperson for Digital, Culture, Media and Sport	2019	2019	Brian Leishman	Labour
SNP	Kirsten Oswald	East Renfrewshire	SNP Spokesperson for Women and Equalities	2019	2019	Blair McDougall	Labour
SNP	Anum Qaisar	Airdrie and Shotts	SNP Spokesperson for Levelling Up	2021	2015	Kenneth Stevenson	Labour
SNP	Tommy Sheppard	Edinburgh East and Musselburgh (Note: Originally elected for Edinburgh East.)	SNP Scotland Spokesperson	2015	2015	Chris Murray	Labour
SNP	Alyn Smith	Stirling and Strathallan (Note: Originally elected for Stirling.)	SNP Spokesperson for Europe and EU Accession	2019	2019	Chris Kane	Labour
SNP	Chris Stephens	Glasgow South West	SNP Spokesperson for Justice and Immigration	2015	2015	Zubir Ahmed	Labour
SNP	Alison Thewliss	Glasgow North (Note: Originally elected for Glasgow Central.)	SNP Spokesperson for Home Affairs	2015	2015	Martin Rhodes	Labour
SNP	Owen Thompson	Midlothian	Chief Whip of the Scottish National Party in the House of Commons	2019	2019	Kirsty McNeill	Labour
SNP	Richard Thomson	Gordon and Buchan (Note: Originally elected for Gordon.)	SNP Spokesperson for Northern Ireland, Wales, Business and Trade	2019	2019	Harriet Cross	Conservative
Independent	Andrew Bridgen (Note: Originally elected for the Conservative Party.)	North West Leicestershire		2010	2010	Amanda Hack	Labour
Independent	Julian Knight	Solihull West and Shirley (Note: Originally elected for Solihull.)	Chair of the Culture, Media and Sport Committee (2020–2023)	2015	2015	Neil Shastri-Hurst	Conservative
Independent	Angus MacNeil (Note: Originally elected for the Scottish National Party.)	Na h-Eileanan an Iar		2005	2005	Torcuil Crichton	Labour
Independent	Rob Roberts	Clwyd East (Note: Originally elected for Delyn.)		2019	2019	Becky Gittins	Labour
Independent	Claudia Webbe (Note: Originally elected for the Labour Party.)	Leicester East		2019	1987	Shivani Raja	Conservative
Labour	Jonathan Ashworth	Leicester South	Shadow Paymaster General	2011	2005	Shockat Adam	Independent
Labour	Thangam Debbonaire	Bristol Central (Note: Originally elected for Bristol West.)	Shadow Secretary of State for Culture, Media and Sport	2015	2015	Carla Denyer	Green
Labour	Kate Hollern	Blackburn	Shadow Minister for Communities and Local Government (2016–2021)	2015	1955	Adnan Hussain	Independent
Labour	Khalid Mahmood	Birmingham Perry Barr	Shadow Minister for Defence Procurement (2020–2021)	2001	1974	Ayoub Khan	Independent
Alba	Neale Hanvey	Cowdenbeath and Kirkcaldy	Leader of the Alba Party in the House of Commons	2019	2019	Melanie Ward	Labour
Alba	Kenny MacAskill	Alloa and Grangemouth (Note: Originally elected for East Lothian.)		2019	2019	Brian Leishman	Labour
DUP	Paul Girvan	South Antrim		2017	2017	Robin Swann	UUP
DUP	Ian Paisley Jr	North Antrim		2010	1970	Jim Allister	TUV
Alliance	Stephen Farry	North Down		2019	2019	Alex Easton	Independent
Workers Party	George Galloway	Rochdale		2024	2024	Paul Waugh	Labour

== Seats which changed allegiance ==
=== Conservative to Labour ===
- Aldershot
- Altrincham and Sale West
- Amber Valley
- Ashford
- Aylesbury
- Bangor Aberconwy
- Banbury
- Barrow & Furness
- Basingstoke
- Bassetlaw
- Bexleyheath and Crayford
- Birmingham Northfield
- Bishop Auckland
- Blackpool North & Fleetwood
- Blackpool south
- Bolsover
- Bolton North East
- Bolton West
- Bournemouth East
- Bournemouth West
- Bracknell
- Brigend
- Broxtowe
- Buckingham and Bletchley
- Burnley
- Burton and Uttoxeter
- Bury North
- Bury South
- Bury St Edmunds and Stowmarket
- Calder Valley
- Camborne and Redruth
- Cambridgeshire North West
- Cannock Chase
- Carlisle
- Chatham and Aylesford
- Chelsea and Fulham
- Chipping Barnet
- Cities of London and Westminster
- Clwyd East
- Clwyd North
- Colchester
- Colne Valley
- Congleton
- Corby and East Northamptonshire
- Cornwall South East
- Crawley
- Crewe and Nantwich
- Darlington
- Dartford
- Derby North
- Derbyshire Dales
- Derbyshire North East
- Derbyshire South
- Doncaster East and The Isle of Axholme
- Dorset South
- Dover and Deal
- Dudley
- Dunstable and Leighton Buzzard
- Earley and Woodley
- East Thanet
- East Worthing and Shoreham
- Eltham and Chislehurst
- Erewash
- Filton and Bradley Stoke
- Finchley and Golders Green
- Folkestone and Hythe
- Forest of Dean
- Gedling
- Gillingham and Rainham
- Gloucester
- Gravesham
- Great Grimsby and Cleethorpes
- Hemel Hempstead
- Hendon
- Halesowen
- Harlow
- Hertfordshire North East
- Hertford and Stortford
- Hastings and Rye
- Hexham
- High Peak
- Hitchin
- Kingston upon Hull West and Haltemprice
- Hyndburn
- Ipswich
- Isle of Wight West
- Kettering
- Lancaster and Wyre
- Leeds North West
- Leeds South West and Morley
- Leigh and Atherton
- Lichfield
- Lincoln
- Leicestershire North West
- Loughborough
- Lowestoft
- Macclesfield
- Mansfield
- Mid Cheshire
- Mid Derbyshire
- Mid and South Pembrokeshire
- Middlesbrough South and Cleveland East
- Milton Keynes Central
- Milton Keynes North
- Monmouthshire
- Montgomeryshire and Glyndwr
- Morecambe and Lunesdale
- Newcastle-under-Lyme
- Newton Aycliffe and Spennymoor
- Norfolk South
- Norfolk South West
- North East Hertfordshire
- North East Somerset and Hanham
- Northampton North
- Northampton South
- Northumberland North
- Norwich North
- Nuneaton
- Ossett and Denby Dale
- Pendle and Clitheroe
- Penistone and Stocksbridge
- Penrith and Solway
- Peterborough
- Plymouth Moor View
- Portsmouth North
- Poole
- Reading West and Mid Berkshire
- Redcar
- Redditch
- South Ribble
- Ribble Valley
- Rochester and Strood
- Rochford and Southend East
- Rossendale and Darwen
- Rother Valley
- Rugby
- Rushcliffe
- Scarborough and Whitby
- Scunthorpe
- Selby
- Sherwood Forest
- Shipley
- Shrewsbury
- Sittingbourne and Sheppey
- Somerset North
- South Dorset
- South Norfolk
- Southampton Itchen
- Southend West and Leigh
- Southport
- Spen Valley
- St Austell and Newquay
- Stafford
- Stevenage
- Stoke-on-Trent Central
- Stoke-on-Trent North
- Stoke-on-Trent South
- Stourbridge
- Stroud
- Suffolk Coastal
- Swindon North
- Swindon South
- Tamworth
- Telford
- Thurrock
- Tipton and Wednesbury
- Uxbridge and South Ruislip
- Truro and Falmouth
- Vale of Glamorgan
- Wakefield and Rothwell
- Walsall and Bloxwich
- Warwickshire North and Bedworth
- Watford
- Wellingborough and Rushden
- Welwyn Hatfield
- West Bromwich
- Weston-super-Mare
- Whitehaven and Workington
- Wolverhampton North East
- Wolverhampton West
- Worcester
- Worthing West
- Wrexham
- Wycombe
- York Outer

=== Conservative to Liberal Democrats ===
- Bicester and Woodstock
- Brecon, Radnor and Cwmtawe
- Carshalton and Wallington
- Cheadle
- Chelmsford
- Cheltenham
- Chesham and Amersham
- Chichester
- Chippenham
- Cornwall North
- Cotswolds South
- Devon North
- Didcot and Wantage
- Dorking and Horley
- Dorset Mid and Poole North
- Eastbourne
- Eastleigh
- Ely and East Cambridgeshire
- Epsom and Ewell
- Esher and Walton
- Frome and East Somerset
- Glastonbury and Somerton
- Guildford
- Hampshire North East
- Harpenden and Berkhamsted
- Harrogate and Knaresborough
- Hazel Grove
- Henley and Thame
- Honiton and Sidmouth
- Horsham
- Lewes
- Maidenhead
- Melksham and Devizes
- Mid Dorset and North Poole
- Mid Sussex
- Newbury
- Newton Abbot
- Norfolk North
- Shropshire North
- South Cambridgeshire
- South Devon
- St Ives
- St Neots and Mid Cambridgeshire
- Stratford-on-Avon
- Surrey Heath
- Sutton and Cheam
- Taunton and Wellington
- Tewkesbury
- Thornbury and Yate
- Tiverton and Minehead
- Torbay
- Tunbridge Wells
- Wells and Mendip Hills
- West Dorset
- Westmorland and Lonsdale
- Wimbledon
- Winchester
- Witney
- Woking
- Wokingham
- Yeovil

=== Scottish National to Labour ===
- Airdrie and Shotts
- Alloa and Grangemouth
- Ayr, Carrick and Cumnock
- Bathgate and Linlithgow
- Central Ayrshire
- Coatbridge and Bellshill
- Cowdenbeath and Kirkcaldy
- Cumbernauld and Kirkintilloch
- Dunfermline and Dollar
- East Kilbride and Strathaven
- East Renfrewshire
- Edinburgh East and Musselburgh
- Edinburgh North and Leith
- Edinburgh South West
- Falkirk
- Glasgow East
- Glasgow North
- Glasgow North East
- Glasgow South
- Glasgow South West
- Glasgow West
- Glenrothes and Mid Fife
- Hamilton and Clyde Valley
- Inverclyde and Renfrewshire West
- Kilmarnock and Loudoun
- Livingston
- Lothian East
- Midlothian
- Motherwell, Wishaw and Carluke
- Na h-Eileanan an Iar
- North Ayrshire and Arran
- Paisley and Renfrewshire North
- Paisley and Renfrewshire South
- Rutherglen
- Stirling and Strathallan
- West Dunbartonshire

=== Scottish National to Liberal Democrats ===
- Caithness, Sutherland and Easter Ross
- Inverness, Skye and West Ross-shire
- Mid Dunbartonshire

=== Labour to Independent ===
- Birmingham Perry Barr
- Blackburn
- Dewsbury and Batley
- Islington North
- Leicester South

=== Labour to Green ===
- Bristol Central

=== Labour to Conservative ===
- Leicester East

=== Conservative to Reform UK ===
- Ashfield
- Boston and Skegness
- Clacton
- Great Yarmouth
- South Basildon and East Thurrock

=== Conservative to Green ===
- North Herefordshire
- Waveney Valley

=== Conservative to Scottish National ===
- Aberdeenshire North and Moray East

=== Conservative to Plaid Cymru ===
- Caerfyrddin
- Ynys Mon

=== DUP to TUV ===
- North Antrim

=== DUP to UUP ===
- South Antrim

=== DUP to Alliance ===
- Lagan Valley

=== Alliance to Independent ===
- North Down

== Open seats changing hands ==
Party	Candidate	Retiring incumbent	Constituency	Defeated by	Party
Conservative	Oliver Carroll	Graham Brady	Altrincham and Sale West	Connor Rand	Labour
Conservative	Hannah Gray	Bob Stewart	Beckenham and Penge (Note: Represented predecessor seat Beckenham.)	Liam Conlon	Labour
Conservative	Mark Brooks	David Evennett	Bexleyheath and Crayford	Daniel Francis	Labour
Conservative	Jane MacBean	Dehenna Davison	Bishop Auckland	Sam Rushworth	Labour
Conservative	Adele Warren	Mark Logan	Bolton North East	Kirith Entwistle	Labour
Conservative	Anita Boateng	Jamie Wallis	Bridgend	Chris Elmore	Labour
Conservative	Will Tanner	Jo Churchill	Bury St Edmunds and Stowmarket (Note: Represented predecessor seat Bury St Edmunds.)	Peter Prinsley	Labour
Conservative	Vanessa Lee	Craig Whittaker	Calder Valley	Josh Fenton-Glynn	Labour
Conservative	Connor Donnithorne	George Eustice	Camborne and Redruth	Perran Moon	Labour
SNP	Annie McIndoe	Philippa Whitford	Central Ayrshire	Alan Gemmell	Labour
Conservative	Nathan Gamester	Tracey Crouch	Chatham and Aylesford	Tris Osborne	Labour
Conservative	Nic Puntis	Michelle Donelan	Chippenham	Sarah Gibson	Liberal Democrats
Conservative	Tim Barnes	Nickie Aiken	Cities of London and Westminster	Rachel Blake	Labour
Conservative	James Cracknell	Will Quince	Colchester	Pam Cox	Labour
Conservative	Zack Ali	Henry Smith	Crawley	Peter Lamb	Labour
Conservative	Ben Fletcher	Kieran Mullan	Crewe and Nantwich	Connor Naismith	Labour
Conservative	Stephen James	Natalie Elphicke	Dover and Deal	Mike Tapp	Labour
Conservative	Helen Harrison	Craig Mackinlay	East Thanet (Note: Represented predecessor seat South Thanet.)	Polly Billington	Labour
Conservative	Leila Williams	Tim Loughton	East Worthing and Shoreham	Tom Rutland	Labour
Conservative	Samuel Joynson	Paul Holmes	Eastleigh	Liz Jarvis	Liberal Democrats
Conservative	Mhairi Fraser	Chris Grayling	Epsom and Ewell	Helen Maguire	Liberal Democrats
Conservative	John Cope	Dominic Raab	Esher and Walton	Monica Harding	Liberal Democrats
SNP	Toni Giugliano	John McNally	Falkirk	Euan Stainbank	Labour
Conservative	Alex Deane	Mike Freer	Finchley and Golders Green	Sarah Sackman	Labour
Conservative	James Clark	Brandon Lewis	Great Yarmouth	Rupert Lowe	Reform
Conservative	Hannah Ellis	Robert Halfon	Harlow	Chris Vince	Labour
Conservative	Paul Athans	William Wragg	Hazel Grove	Lisa Smart	Liberal Democrats
Conservative	Andrew Williams	Mike Penning	Hemel Hempstead	David Taylor	Labour
Conservative	Ameet Jogia	Matthew Offord	Hendon	David Pinto-Duschinsky	Labour
DUP	Jonathan Buckley	Jeffrey Donaldson	Lagan Valley	Sorcha Eastwood	Alliance
Conservative	Michael Winstanley	James Grundy	Leigh and Atherton (Note: Represented predecessor seat Leigh.)	Jo Platt	Labour
Alba	George Kerevan	Kenny MacAskill	Lothian East	Douglas Alexander	Labour
Conservative	Tania Mathias	Theresa May	Maidenhead	Joshua Reynolds	Liberal Democrats
Labour	Maahwish Mirza	Alistair Strathern (Note: Elected for new seat Hitchin)	Mid Bedfordshire	Blake Stephenson	Conservative
Conservative	Luke Gardiner	Pauline Latham	Mid Derbyshire	Jonathan Davies	Labour
Conservative	Kristy Adams	Mims Davies	Mid Sussex	Alison Bennett	Liberal Democrats
Conservative	Simon Tagg	Aaron Bell	Newcastle-under-Lyme	Adam Jogee	Labour
Conservative	Nikki da Costa	Oliver Heald	North East Hertfordshire	Chris Hinchliff	Labour
Conservative	Dan Bennett	Michael Ellis	Northampton North	Lucy Rigby	Labour
Conservative	Charlotte Saloman	Chloe Smith	Norwich North	Alice Macdonald	Labour
SNP	Jacqueline Cameron	Mhairi Black	Paisley and Renfrewshire South	Johanna Baxter	Labour
Conservative	Yousef Dahmash	Mark Pawsey	Rugby	John Slinger	Labour
Conservative	Roberto Weedan-Sanz	Robert Goodwill	Scarborough and Whitby	Alison Hume	Labour
Conservative	Aisha Cuthbert	Gordon Henderson	Sittingbourne and Sheppey	Kevin McKenna	Labour
Conservative	Chris Carter-Chapman	Anthony Browne	South Cambridgeshire	Pippa Heylings	Liberal Democrats
Conservative	Poppy Simister-Thomas	Richard Bacon	South Norfolk	Ben Goldsborough	Labour
Conservative	Gavin Haran	James Duddridge	Southend East and Rochford	Bayo Alaba	Labour
Conservative	Sidney Yankson	Royston Smith	Southampton Itchen	Darren Paffey	Labour
Conservative	Alex Clarkson	Stephen McPartland	Stevenage	Kevin Bonavia	Labour
Conservative	Chandra Kanneganti	Jo Gideon	Stoke-on-Trent Central	Gareth Snell	Labour
Conservative	Ed McGuinness	Michael Gove	Surrey Heath	Al Pinkerton	Liberal Democrats
Conservative	Tom Drummond	Paul Scully	Sutton and Cheam	Luke Taylor	Liberal Democrats
Conservative	Hannah Campbell	Lucy Allan	Telford	Shaun Davies	Labour
Conservative	Neil Mahapatra	Greg Clark	Tunbridge Wells	Mike Martin	Liberal Democrats
Conservative	Danielle Dunfield-Prayero	Stephen Hammond	Wimbledon	Paul Kohler	Liberal Democrats
Conservative	Lucy Demery	John Redwood	Wokingham	Clive Jones	Liberal Democrats
Conservative	Marc Bayliss	Robin Walker	Worcester	Tom Collins	Labour
