= Defence Select Committee =

UK House of Commons select committee

The Defence Select Committee is one of the Select Committees of the House of Commons of the United Kingdom, having been established in 1979. It examines the expenditure, administration, and policy of the Ministry of Defence and its associated public bodies, including the British Armed Forces. The Committee's remit does not generally review Defence Intelligence which instead falls under the Intelligence and Security Committee of Parliament.

== Chairs ==
Committee chairs include those listed below.

Name	Start	End	Party	Constituency
John Langford-Holt	3 May 1979	20 May 1981	Conservative	Shrewsbury
Cranley Onslow	20 May 1981	21 April 1982	Conservative	Woking
Timothy Kitson	21 April 1982	9 June 1983	Conservative	Richmond (Yorks)
Humphrey Atkins	9 June 1983	31 December 1986	Conservative	Spelthorne
Michael Mates	1 January 1987	1 January 1992	Conservative	East Hampshire
Nicholas Bonsor	1 January 1992	12 July 1995	Conservative	Upminster
Michael Colvin	12 July 1995	21 March 1997	Conservative	Romsey and Waterside
Bruce George	16 July 1997	12 July 2005	Labour	Walsall South
James Arbuthnot	13 July 2005	28 April 2014	Conservative	North East Hampshire
Rory Stewart	14 May 2014	12 May 2015	Conservative	Penrith and The Border
Julian Lewis	18 June 2015	6 November 2019	Conservative	New Forest East
Tobias Ellwood	29 January 2020	14 September 2023	Conservative	Bournemouth East
Robert Courts	25 October 2023	12 December 2023	Conservative	Witney
Jeremy Quin	17 January 2024	30 May 2024	Conservative	Horsham
Tan Dhesi	11 September 2024	present	Labour	Slough

=== Election results ===
From June 2010 chairs of select committees have been directly elected by a secret ballot of the whole House of Commons using the alternative vote system. Candidates with the fewest votes are eliminated and their votes redistributed until one remaining candidate has more than half of valid votes. Elections are held at the beginning of a parliament or in the event of a vacancy.

Chair	Party	Constituency	First elected	Method
Michael Mates	Conservative	East Hampshire	1987	Elected by the Select Committee
Michael Colvin	Conservative	Romsey and Waterside	1995	Elected by the Select Committee
Bruce George	Labour	Walsall South	16 July 1997	Elected by the Select Committee
James Arbuthnot	Conservative	North East Hampshire	13 July 2005	Elected by the Select Committee (and the House of Commons in 2010)
Rory Stewart	Conservative	Penrith and The Border	14 May 2014	Elected by the House of Commons
Julian Lewis	Conservative	New Forest East	17 June 2015	Elected by the House of Commons
Tobias Ellwood	Conservative	Bournemouth East	29 January 2020	Elected by the House of Commons
Tobias Ellwood	Independent	Bournemouth East	29 January 2020	Elected by the House of Commons
Tobias Ellwood	Conservative	Bournemouth East	29 January 2020	Elected by the House of Commons
Robert Courts	Conservative	Witney	25 October 2023	Elected by the House of Commons
Jeremy Quin	Conservative	Horsham	17 January 2024	Elected by the House of Commons
Tan Dhesi	Labour	Slough	11 September 2024	Elected by the House of Commons

11 September 2024
Candidate	1st round	
Candidate	Votes	%
Tan Dhesi	320	56.8
Derek Twigg	243	43.2
Valid votes	563	

17 January 2024
Candidate	1st round	
Candidate	Votes	%
Jeremy Quin	371	78.6
Rehman Chishti	101	21.4
Valid votes	472	

25 October 2023
Candidate	1st round	
Candidate	Votes	%
Robert Courts	249	57.9
Sarah Atherton	142	33.0
Mark Francois	39	9.1
Valid votes	430	

29 January 2020
Candidate	1st round		2nd round		3rd round		4th round	
Candidate	Votes	%	Votes	%	Votes	%	Votes	%
Tobias Ellwood	243	43.2	256	46.1	271	49.7	296	56.7
Sir Bernard Jenkin	173	30.8	183	33.0	193	35.4	226	43.3
Robert Courts	62	11.0	68	12.3	81	14.9	Eliminated	
Adam Holloway	45	8.0	48	8.6	Eliminated			
James Gray	39	6.9	Eliminated					
Not redistributed			7	1.2	17	3.0	40	7.1
Valid votes	562		555		545		522	

12 July 2017
Candidate	1st round	
Candidate	Votes	%
Julian Lewis	305	53.5
Johnny Mercer	265	46.5
Not redistributed		
Valid votes	570	

17 June 2015
Candidate	1st round		2nd round	
Candidate	Votes	%	Votes	%
Julian Lewis	260	44.1	314	56.5
Richard Benyon	208	35.3	242	43.5
Bob Stewart	121	20.5	Eliminated	
Not redistributed			33	5.6
Valid votes	589		556	

14 May 2014
Candidate	1st round		2nd round		3rd round		4th round		5th round		6th round		7th round	
Candidate	Votes	%	Votes	%	Votes	%	Votes	%	Votes	%	Votes	%	Votes	%
Rory Stewart	113	23.6	115	24.1	122	25.7	139	29.3	149	31.9	179	39.3	226	51.6
Julian Lewis	124	25.9	128	26.8	131	27.6	138	29.1	156	33.4	165	36.2	212	48.4
Julian Brazier	68	14.2	71	14.9	71	14.9	77	16.2	90	19.3	112	24.6	Eliminated	
Keith Simpson	48	10.0	48	10.1	51	10.7	61	12.8	72	15.4	Eliminated			
Bob Stewart	52	10.9	54	11.3	56	11.8	60	12.6	Eliminated					
Crispin Blunt	44	9.2	44	9.2	44	9.3	Eliminated							
Tobias Ellwood	17	3.5	17	3.6	Eliminated									
James Gray	13	2.7	Eliminated											
Not redistributed			2	0.4	4	0.8	4	0.8	12	2.5	23	4.8	41	8.6
Valid votes	479		477		475		475		467		456		438	

9 June 2010
Candidate	1st round		2nd round		3rd round	
Candidate	Votes	%	Votes	%	Votes	%
James Arbuthnot	210	36.6	236	42.4	273	52.7
Patrick Mercer	176	30.7	189	33.9	245	47.3
Julian Lewis	115	20.1	132	23.7	Eliminated	
Douglas Carswell	72	12.6	Eliminated			
Not redistributed			16	2.8	55	9.6
Valid votes	573		557		518	

== Membership ==
Members are as follows:

Member	Party	Constituency
Tan Dhesi MP (chair)	Labour	Slough
Alex Baker MP	Labour	Aldershot
Graeme Downie MP	Labour	Dunfermline and Dollar
Lincoln Jopp MP	Conservative	Spelthorne
Emma Lewell MP	Labour	South Shields
Mike Martin MP	Liberal Democrats	Tunbridge Wells
Jesse Norman MP	Conservative	Hereford and South Herefordshire
Ian Roome MP	Liberal Democrats	North Devon
Michelle Scrogham MP	Labour	Barrow and Furness
Fred Thomas MP	Labour	Plymouth Moor View
Derek Twigg MP	Labour	Widnes and Halewood

=== Changes since 2024 ===
Date	Outgoing Member & Party	Constituency	→	New Member & Party	Constituency	Source
26 October 2026	Calvin Bailey MP (Labour)	Leyton and Wanstead	→	Graeme Downie MP (Labour)	Dunfermline and Dollar	Hansard

== 2019-2024 Parliament ==
The chair was elected on 29 January 2020, with the members of the committee being announced on 2 March 2020.

Member	Party	Constituency
Tobias Ellwood (chair)	Conservative	Bournemouth East
Stuart Anderson	Conservative	Wolverhampton South West
Sarah Atherton	Conservative	Wrexham
Wayne David	Labour	Caerphilly
Tan Dhesi	Labour	Slough
Martin Docherty-Hughes	Scottish National Party	West Dunbartonshire
Richard Drax	Conservative	South Dorset
Mark Francois	Conservative	Rayleigh and Wickford
Emma Lewell-Buck	Labour	South Shields
Gavin Robinson	Democratic Unionist Party	Belfast East
John Spellar	Labour	Warley

=== Changes 2019-2024 ===
Date	Outgoing Member & Party	Constituency	→	New Member & Party	Constituency	Source
11 May 2020	Wayne David MP (Labour)	Caerphilly	→	Kevan Jones MP (Labour)	North Durham	Hansard
11 May 2020	Tanmanjeet Singh Dhesi MP (Labour)	Slough	→	Derek Twigg MP (Labour)	Halton	Hansard
5 January 2022	Martin Docherty-Hughes MP (SNP)	West Dunbartonshire	→	Dave Doogan MP (SNP)	Angus	Hansard
25 October 2022	Stuart Anderson MP (Conservative)	Wolverhampton South West	→	Andrew Bowie MP (Conservative)	West Aberdeenshire and Kincardine	Hansard
25 October 2022	Sarah Atherton MP (Conservative)	Wrexham	→	Robert Courts MP (Conservative)	Witney	Hansard
8 November 2022	Andrew Bowie MP (Conservative)	West Aberdeenshire and Kincardine	→	Sarah Atherton MP (Conservative)	Wrexham	Hansard
12 September 2023	Dave Doogan MP (SNP)	Angus	→	Martin Docherty-Hughes MP (SNP)	West Dunbartonshire	Hansard
14 September 2023	Tobias Ellwood MP (chair, Conservative)	Bournemouth East	→	Vacant		Hansard
25 October 2023	Vacant		→	Robert Courts MP (chair, Conservative)	Witney	Hansard
25 October 2023	Robert Courts MP (Conservative)	Witney	→	Vacant		Hansard
11 December 2023	Vacant		→	Jesse Norman MP (Conservative)	Hereford and South Herefordshire	Hansard
12 December 2023	Robert Courts MP (chair, Conservative)	Witney	→	Vacant		Hansard
17 January 2024	Vacant		→	Jeremy Quin MP (chair, Conservative)	Horsham	Hansard

== 2017–2019 Parliament ==
The chair was elected on 12 July 2017, with the members of the committee being announced on 11 September 2017.

Member	Party	Constituency
Julian Lewis (chair)	Conservative	New Forest East
Leo Docherty	Conservative	Aldershot
Martin Docherty-Hughes	Scottish National Party	West Dunbartonshire
Mark Francois	Conservative	Rayleigh and Wickford
Graham Jones	Labour	Hyndburn
Johnny Mercer	Conservative	Plymouth Moor View
Madeleine Moon	Labour	Bridgend
Gavin Robinson	Democratic Unionist Party	Belfast East
Ruth Smeeth	Labour	Stoke-on-Trent North
John Spellar	Labour	Warley
Phil Wilson	Labour	Sedgefield

== 2015–2017 Parliament ==
The chair was elected on 18 June 2015, with members being announced on 6 July 2015.

Member	Party	Constituency
Julian Lewis (chair)	Conservative	New Forest East
Richard Benyon	Conservative	Newbury
Douglas Chapman	Scottish National Party	Dunfermline and West Fife
James Gray	Conservative	North Wiltshire
Johnny Mercer	Conservative	Plymouth Moor View
Madeleine Moon	Labour	Bridgend
Conor McGinn	Labour	St Helens North
Jim Shannon	Democratic Unionist Party	Strangford
Ruth Smeeth	Labour	Stoke-on-Trent North
John Spellar	Labour	Warley
Bob Stewart	Conservative	Beckenham

=== Changes 2015–2017 ===
Date	Outgoing Member & Party	Constituency	→	New Member & Party	Constituency	Source
26 October 2015	Conor McGinn MP (Labour)	St Helens North	→	Phil Wilson MP (Labour)	Sedgefield	Hansard
31 October 2016	Richard Benyon MP (Conservative)	Newbury	→	Jack Lopresti MP (Conservative)	Filton and Bradley Stoke	Hansard
5 December 2016	Jim Shannon MP (DUP)	Strangford	→	Gavin Robinson MP (DUP)	Belfast East	Hansard

== 2010–2015 Parliament ==
The chair was elected on 10 June 2010, with members being announced on 12 July 2010.

Member	Party	Constituency
James Arbuthnot (chair)	Conservative	North East Hampshire
Julian Brazier	Conservative	Canterbury
Jeffrey Donaldson	Democratic Unionist Party	Lagan Valley
John Glen	Conservative	Salisbury
David Hamilton	Labour	Midlothian
Mike Hancock	Liberal Democrats	Portsmouth South
Adam Holloway	Conservative	Gravesham
Madeleine Moon	Labour	Bridgend
Alison Seabeck	Labour	Plymouth Moor View
Bob Stewart	Conservative	Beckenham
Gisela Stuart	Labour	Birmingham Edgbaston
John Woodcock	Labour and Co-op	Barrow and Furness

=== Changes 2010–2015 ===
Date	Outgoing Member & Party	Constituency	→	New Member & Party	Constituency	Source
2 November 2010	Adam Holloway MP (Conservative)	Gravesham	→	Penny Mordaunt MP (Conservative)	Portsmouth North	Hansard
2 November 2010	David Hamilton MP (Labour)	Midlothian	→	Thomas Docherty MP (Labour)	Dunfermline and West Fife	Hansard
2 November 2010	Alison Seabeck MP (Labour)	Plymouth Moor View	→	Dai Havard MP (Labour)	Merthyr Tydfil and Rhymney	Hansard
2 November 2010	John Woodcock MP (Labour and Co-op)	Barrow and Furness	→	Sandra Osborne MP (Labour)	Ayr, Carrick and Cumnock	Hansard
24 October 2011	Mike Hancock MP (Liberal Democrats)	Portsmouth South	→	Bob Russell MP (Liberal Democrats)	Colchester	Hansard
5 November 2012	John Glen MP (Conservative)	Salisbury	→	Adam Holloway MP (Conservative)	Gravesham	Hansard
10 June 2013	Sandra Osborne MP (Labour)	Ayr, Carrick and Cumnock	→	Derek Twigg MP (Labour)	Halton	Hansard
4 November 2013	Penny Mordaunt MP (Conservative)	Portsmouth North	→	James Gray MP (Conservative)	North Wiltshire	Hansard
25 November 2013	Thomas Docherty MP (Labour)	Dunfermline and West Fife	→	John Woodcock MP (Labour and Co-op)	Barrow and Furness	Hansard
28 April 2014	James Arbuthnot MP (chair, Conservative)	North East Hampshire	→	Vacant		Hansard
14 May 2014	Vacant		→	Rory Stewart MP (chair, Conservative)	Penrith and The Border	Hansard
3 November 2014	Julian Brazier MP (Conservative)	Canterbury	→	Richard Benyon MP (Conservative)	Newbury	Hansard
3 November 2014	Adam Holloway MP (Conservative)	Gravesham	→	Julian Lewis MP (Conservative)	New Forest East	Hansard

== See also ==
- Parliamentary committees of the United Kingdom
