= Andrew Murrison =

British politician (born 1961)

Surgeon Commander The Right Honourable Andrew Murrison VR MP
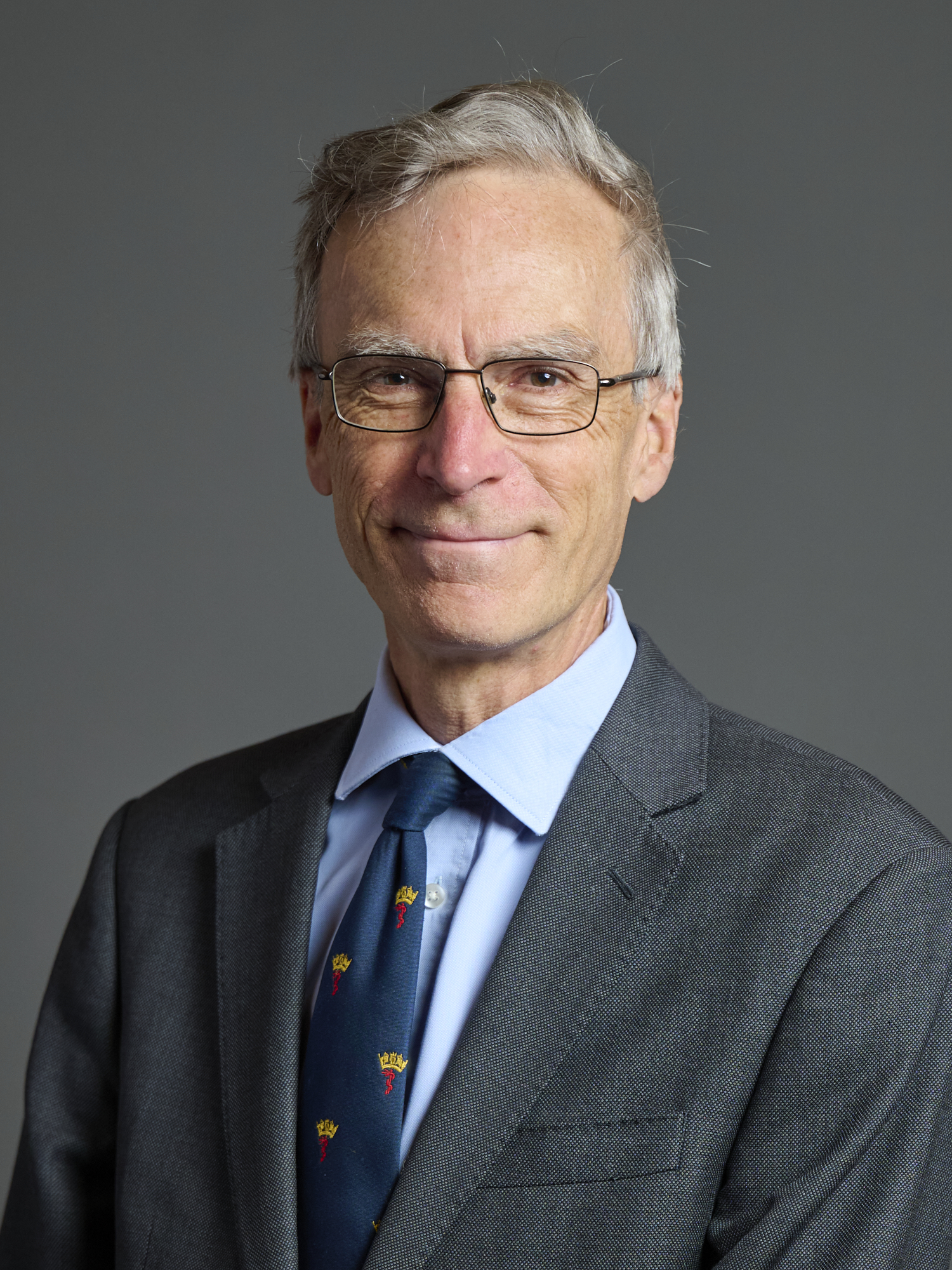
- Official portrait, 2024

Parliamentary Under-Secretary of State for Defence People and Families
- In office 30 October 2022 – 5 July 2024
- Prime Minister: Rishi Sunak
- Preceded by: Sarah Atherton
- Succeeded by: Office abolished

Minister of State for International Development and the Middle East
- In office 9 May 2019 – 13 February 2020
- Prime Minister: Theresa May; Boris Johnson
- Preceded by: Alistair Burt
- Succeeded by: James Cleverly

Chair of the Northern Ireland Affairs Select Committee
- In office 12 July 2017 – 9 May 2019
- Preceded by: Laurence Robertson
- Succeeded by: Simon Hoare

Minister of State for Northern Ireland
- In office 14 July 2014 – 12 May 2015
- Prime Minister: David Cameron
- Preceded by: Andrew Robathan
- Succeeded by: Ben Wallace

Parliamentary Under-Secretary of State for International Security Strategy
- In office 4 September 2012 – 14 July 2014
- Prime Minister: David Cameron
- Preceded by: Gerald Howarth
- Succeeded by: Office abolished

Member of Parliament for South West Wiltshire Westbury (2001–2010)
- Incumbent
- Assumed office 7 June 2001
- Preceded by: David Faber
- Majority: 3,243 (7.0%)

Personal details
- Born: 24 April 1961 (age 65) Colchester, Essex, England
- Party: Conservative
- Spouse: Jenny Murrison
- Children: 5 daughters
- Education: University of Bristol; Britannia Royal Naval College, Dartmouth; Hughes Hall, Cambridge
- Profession: Physician
- Awards: Iraq Medal (2004); Queen Elizabeth II Golden Jubilee Medal (2002); Queen Elizabeth II Diamond Jubilee Medal (2012)
- Website: www.andrewmurrison.co.uk

Military service
- Allegiance: United Kingdom
- Branch/service: Royal Navy; Royal Naval Reserve
- Years of service: 1989–present
- Rank: Surgeon Commander
- Battles/wars: Iraq War

Surgeon Commander Andrew William Murrison (born 24 April 1961) is a British doctor, naval officer and Conservative Party politician who has been the Member of Parliament (MP) for South West Wiltshire, previously Westbury, since 2001. He served as Parliamentary Under-Secretary of State for Defence People and Families from October 2022 to July 2024.

Murrison has held a variety of positions within the British government, including Minister for International Security Strategy, Minister of State for Northern Ireland, and then Minister of State for International Development and the Middle East. In Parliament, he chaired the Northern Ireland Affairs Committee from July 2017 to May 2019.

== Early life and education ==
Andrew Murrison was born on 24 April 1961 in Colchester, the son of William Gordon Murrison RD and his wife Marion Horn. He grew up in Harwich, where he attended Harwich School, and the Britannia Royal Naval College, Dartmouth.

== Medical and naval career ==
Having been awarded a Royal Navy scholarship, Murrison qualified as a doctor from the University of Bristol's medical school in 1984 with the degrees of MB ChB. He was promoted to MD in 1996, the year he graduated from Cambridge with a Diploma in Public Health.

Murrison was commissioned into the Medical Branch of the Royal Navy, and on 1 August 1985 was confirmed in the rank of Surgeon Lieutenant. On 31 December 1997, he was promoted to Surgeon Commander. He served as a medical officer based at Fareham and in 2000 retired with that rank.

During his naval career, for the purpose of qualifying as a general practitioner Murrison worked as a research registrar at Southampton General Hospital. He also spent a year as a postgraduate student at Hughes Hall, Cambridge. On 28 October 2000, he entered the Royal Naval Reserve as a Surgeon Commander.

From 2000, he worked as a general practitioner locum in Wiltshire and as a consultant in occupational health at Gloucestershire Royal Hospital.

In 2003, as a naval reserve officer, Murrison served in Iraq for a six-month tour of duty.

== Political career ==
Before entering full-time politics, Murrison was a member of the Bow Group, an assistant to Sir Peter Lloyd, and then from 1999 to 2000 an assistant to Lord Freeman, whose role at Conservative Central Office was screening potential parliamentary candidates.

== Parliamentary career ==
At the 2001 general election, Murrison was elected to Parliament as the Conservative MP for Westbury with 42.1% of the vote and a majority of 5,294.

In the 2001 Conservative leadership election, Murrison supported Michael Portillo.

In 2004, in a free vote, Murrison voted against the bill to ban foxhunting and hare coursing which became the Hunting Act 2004.

Murrison was re-elected as MP for Westbury at the 2005 general election with an increased vote share of 44.5% and an increased majority of 5,346. After the election, he was appointed as shadow defence minister.

In 2005, he spoke in parliament against a proposed European military union, saying "The threat that the proposed Euro force might pose to one of the most successful post-war organisations, NATO, and to our symbiotic relationship with the United States, has surely not been adequately explored".

In a Commons divisions in 2007 on a number of House of Lords reform options, Murrison voted for options 7 and 8, proposing a 100% elected House of Lords, including the removal of all remaining hereditary peers, and against options 4 and 5, which proposed a partly elected and partly appointed upper chamber.

He chaired the All Party Parliamentary Group on Clinical Leadership and Management, and was a member of the "Cardiac Risk in the Young All Party Parliamentary Group".

With effect from the 2010 general election, Murrison's constituency of Westbury was abolished and replaced with South West Wiltshire. He was elected as MP for South West Wiltshire with 51.7% of the vote and a majority of 10,367. The election led to the formation of the Cameron–Clegg coalition government.

In November 2011, Murrison was appointed as the Prime Minister's special representative for First World War centenary commemorations.

In September 2012 Murrison was appointed as Minister for International Security Strategy in the Ministry of Defence.

In 2013, the Conservatives were divided when Murrison voted for the second reading of the Marriage (Same Sex Couples) Bill.

In July 2014, Murrison was appointed as Parliamentary Under-Secretary of State at the Northern Ireland Office.

At the 2015 general election, Murrison was re-elected as MP for South West Wiltshire with an increased vote share of 52.7% and an increased majority of 18,168.

In January 2016, he appointed Prime Ministerial Trade Envoy to Tunisia and Morocco, until his resignation on 5 July 2022.

Murrison was again re-elected at the snap 2017 general election with an increased vote share of 60% and an increased majority of 18,326. He was again re-elected at the 2019 general election with an increased vote share of 60.2% and an increased majority of 21,630. At the 2024 general election, Murrison was again re-elected, with a decreased vote share of 33.8% and a decreased majority of 3,243.

== Personal life ==
Murrison is married to Jennifer (Jenny) Munden, a physiotherapist. They have five daughters and live near Mere in Wiltshire.

He was sworn in as a member of the Privy Council on 22 May 2019 at Buckingham Palace. This gave him the honorific prefix "The Right Honourable" for life.

== Decorations ==

Ribbon	Description	Notes
	Iraq Medal	
	Queen Elizabeth II Golden Jubilee Medal	2002; UK version of this medal
	Queen Elizabeth II Diamond Jubilee Medal	2012; UK version of this medal
	Queen Elizabeth II Platinum Jubilee Medal	2022; UK version of this medal
	King Charles III Coronation Medal	2023; UK version of this medal
	Volunteer Reserves Service Medal	2013; and clasp, 2024

== Publications ==
- Andrew Murrison (31 October 2011). Tommy This an' Tommy That: The military covenant. Biteback Publishing. ISBN 978-1-84954-255-5.
- Andrew Murrison (19 April 2017). Redemption. Endeavour Press. ISBN 978-1-52131-825-6.

Parliament of the United Kingdom
Preceded by David Faber	Member of Parliament for Westbury; 2001–2010	Constituency renamed
New constituency	Member of Parliament for South West Wiltshire; 2010–present	Incumbent
