= Northern Ireland Affairs Select Committee =

UK House of Commons select committee

The Northern Ireland Affairs Select Committee (or simply the Northern Ireland Affairs Committee) is a select committee of the House of Commons in the Parliament of the United Kingdom. The committee's remit is to examine the expenditure, administration and policy of the Northern Ireland Office and its associated public bodies. Select Committees work in both houses and report on governmental departments and economic affairs.

== Chairs ==
Committee chairs include those listed below.

| Name | Start | End | Party | Constituency |
|---|---|---|---|---|
| James Kilfedder | 16 November 1994 | 20 March 1995 | Ulster Popular Unionist Party | North Down |
| Clive Soley | 26 April 1995 | 21 March 1997 | Labour | Hammersmith |
| Peter Brooke | 28 July 1997 | 11 May 2001 | Conservative | Cities of London and Westminster |
| Michael Mates | 16 July 2001 | 12 July 2005 | Conservative | East Hampshire |
| Patrick Cormack | 18 July 2005 | 12 April 2010 | Conservative | South Staffordshire |
| Laurence Robertson | 10 June 2010 | 3 May 2017 | Conservative | Tewkesbury |
| Andrew Murrison | 12 July 2017 | 15 May 2019 | Conservative | South West Wiltshire |
| Kate Hoey; Acting | 15 May 2019 | 15 June 2019 | Labour | Vauxhall |
| Simon Hoare | 15 June 2019 | 13 November 2023 | Conservative | North Dorset |
| Robert Buckland | 28 November 2023 | 30 May 2024 | Conservative | South Swindon |
| Tonia Antoniazzi | 9 September 2024 | present | Labour | Gower |

== Membership ==
Membership of the committee is as follows:

| Member | Party | Constituency |
|---|---|---|
| Tonia Antoniazzi MP (Chair) | Labour | Gower |
| Sorcha Eastwood MP | Alliance | Lagan Valley |
| Claire Hanna MP | Social Democratic and Labour Party | Belfast South and Mid Down |
| Simon Hoare MP | Conservative | North Dorset |
| Adam Jogee MP | Labour | Newcastle-under-Lyme |
| Mike Kane MP | Labour | Wythenshawe and Sale East |
| Paul Kohler MP | Liberal Democrats | Wimbledon |
| Katrina Murray MP | Labour | Cumbernauld and Kirkintilloch |
| Gavin Robinson MP | Democratic Unionist Party | Belfast East |
| Alec Shelbrooke MP | Conservative | Wetherby and Easingwold |
| David Smith MP | Labour | North Northumberland |
| Robin Swann MP | Ulster Unionist Party | South Antrim |
| Sean Woodcock MP | Labour | Banbury |

=== Changes since 2024 ===
| Date | Outgoing Member & Party | Constituency | → | New Member & Party | Constituency | Source |
|---|---|---|---|---|---|---|
| 16 December 2024 | Jerome Mayhew MP (Conservative) | Broadland and Fakenham | → | Simon Hoare MP (Conservative) | North Dorset | Hansard |
| 13 November 2025 | Al Pinkerton MP (Liberal Democrats) | Surrey Heath | → | Paul Kohler MP (Liberal Democrats) | Wimbledon | Hansard |
| 17 November 2025 | Leigh Ingham MP (Labour) | Stafford | → | Mike Kane MP (Labour) | Wythenshawe and Sale East | Hansard |
| 8 December 2025 | Dan Aldridge MP (Labour) | Weston-super-Mare | → | Vacant | | Hansard |
| 12 January 2026 | Vacant | | → | Robin Swann MP (Ulster Unionist Party) | South Antrim | Hansard |
| 29 June 2026 | Alicia Kearns MP (Conservative) | Rutland and Stamford | → | Alec Shelbrooke MP (Conservative) | Wetherby and Easingwold | Hansard |
| 11 November 2026 | Chris Bloore MP (Labour) | Redditch | → | Sean Woodcock MP (Labour) | Banbury | Hansard |

== 2019-2024 Parliament ==
The chair was elected on 29 January 2020, with the members of the committee being announced on 2 March 2020.

| Member | Party | Constituency |
|---|---|---|
| Simon Hoare MP (Chair) | Conservative | North Dorset |
| Caroline Ansell MP | Conservative | Eastbourne |
| Scott Benton MP | Conservative | Blackpool South |
| Gregory Campbell MP | Democratic Unionist | East Londonderry |
| Sir Robert Goodwill MP | Conservative | Scarborough and Whitby |
| Stephen Farry MP | Alliance | North Down |
| Claire Hanna MP | SDLP | Belfast South |
| Conor McGinn MP | Labour | St Helens North |
| Ian Paisley Jr MP | Democratic Unionist | North Antrim |
| Karin Smyth | Labour | Bristol South |
| Bob Stewart MP | Conservative (Note: Whip suspended from 4 November 2023 to 23 May 2024.) | Beckenham |

=== Changes 2019-2024 ===
| Date | Outgoing member and party | Constituency | → | New member and party | Constituency | Source |
|---|---|---|---|---|---|---|
| 8 June 2020 | Karin Smyth MP (Labour) | Bristol South | → | Mary Kelly Foy MP (Labour) | City of Durham | Hansard |
| 6 July 2020 | Conor McGinn MP (Labour) | St Helens North | → | Stephanie Peacock MP (Labour) | Barnsley East | Hansard |
| 11 January 2021 | Caroline Ansell MP (Conservative) | Eastbourne | → | Fay Jones MP (Conservative) | Brecon and Radnorshire | Hansard |
| 25 October 2022 | Scott Benton MP (Conservative) | Blackpool South | → | Robin Walker MP (Conservative) | Worcester | Hansard |
| 8 November 2022 | Gregory Campbell MP (DUP) | East Londonderry | → | Carla Lockhart MP (DUP) | Upper Bann | Hansard |
| 8 November 2022 | Fay Jones MP (Conservative) | Brecon and Radnorshire | → | Sir Robert Buckland MP (Conservative) | South Swindon | Hansard |
| 29 November 2022 | Stephanie Peacock MP (Labour) | Barnsley East | → | Tony Lloyd MP (Labour) | Rochdale | Hansard |
| 9 January 2023 | Ian Paisley Jr MP (DUP) | North Antrim | → | Jim Shannon MP (DUP) | Strangford | Hansard |
| 14 November 2023 | Simon Hoare MP (Chair, Conservative) | North Dorset | → | Vacant | | Hansard |
| 28 November 2023 | Vacant | | → | Sir Robert Buckland MP (Chair, Conservative) | South Swindon | Hansard |
| 28 November 2023 | Sir Robert Buckland MP (Conservative) | South Swindon | → | Vacant | | Hansard |
| 17 January 2024 | Tony Lloyd MP (Labour) | Rochdale | → | Vacant | | Death of member |
| 22 January 2024 | Robin Walker MP (Conservative) | Worcester | → | Kelly Tolhurst MP (Conservative) | Rochester and Strood | Hansard |
| 14 May 2024 | Vacant | | → | Damian Collins MP (Conservative) | Folkestone and Hythe | Hansard |

== 2017-2019 Parliament ==
The election of the chair took place on 12 July 2017, with the members of the committee being announced on 11 September 2017.

| Member | Party | Constituency |
|---|---|---|
| Dr Andrew Murrison MP (Chair) | Conservative | South West Wiltshire |
| Gregory Campbell MP | Democratic Unionist | East Londonderry |
| Maria Caulfield MP | Conservative | Lewes |
| Stephen Hepburn MP | Labour | Jarrow |
| Lady Sylvia Hermon MP | Independent | North Down |
| Kate Hoey MP | Labour | Vauxhall |
| Jack Lopresti MP | Conservative | Filton and Bradley Stoke |
| Conor McGinn MP | Labour | St Helens North |
| Nigel Mills MP | Conservative | Amber Valley |
| Ian Paisley Jr MP | Democratic Unionist | North Antrim |
| Jim Shannon MP | Democratic Unionist | Strangford |

=== Changes 2017-2019 ===
| Date | Outgoing member and party | Constituency | → | New member and party | Constituency | Source |
|---|---|---|---|---|---|---|
| 16 October 2017 | New seat | | → | Bob Stewart MP (Conservative) | Beckenham | Hansard |
| 20 November 2017 | New seat | | → | John Grogan MP (Labour) | Keighley | Hansard |
| 5 March 2018 | Maria Caulfield MP (Conservative) | Lewes | → | Robert Goodwill MP (Conservative) | Scarborough and Whitby | Hansard |
| 23 July 2018 | Jack Lopresti MP (Conservative) | Filton and Bradley Stoke | → | Maria Caulfield MP (Conservative) | Lewes | Hansard |
| 8 April 2019 | Robert Goodwill MP (Conservative) | Scarborough and Whitby | → | Desmond Swayne MP (Conservative) | New Forest West | Hansard |
| 15 May 2019 | Dr Andrew Murrison | South West Wiltshire | → | Vacant | | Hansard |
| 12 June 2019 | Vacant | | → | Simon Hoare | North Dorset | Hansard |

== 2015-2017 Parliament ==
The chair was elected on 18 June 2015, with members being announced on 6 July 2015.

| Member | Party | Constituency |
|---|---|---|
| Laurence Robertson MP (Chair) | Conservative | Tewkesbury |
| David Anderson MP | Labour | Blaydon |
| Oliver Colvile MP | Conservative | Plymouth Sutton and Devonport |
| Nigel Evans MP | Conservative | Ribble Valley |
| Stephen Hepburn MP | Labour | Jarrow |
| Kate Hoey MP | Labour | Vauxhall |
| Lady Sylvia Hermon MP | Independent | North Down |
| Danny Kinahan MP | Ulster Unionist | South Antrim |
| Jack Lopresti MP | Conservative | Filton and Bradley Stoke |
| Dr Alasdair McDonnell MP | Social Democratic and Labour Party | Belfast South |
| Nigel Mills MP | Conservative | Amber Valley |
| Ian Paisley Jr MP | Democratic Unionist | North Antrim |

=== Changes 2015-2017 ===
| Date | Outgoing member and party | Constituency | → | New member and party | Constituency | Source |
|---|---|---|---|---|---|---|
| 1 February 2016 | David Anderson MP (Labour) | Blaydon | → | Tom Blenkinsop MP (Labour) | Middlesbrough South and East Cleveland | Hansard |
| 21 November 2016 | Oliver Colvile MP (Conservative) | Plymouth Sutton and Devonport | → | Bob Stewart MP (Conservative) | Beckenham | Hansard |
| 28 November 2016 | Nigel Evans MP (Conservative) | Ribble Valley | → | Mark Pritchard MP (Conservative) | The Wrekin | Hansard |
| 5 December 2016 | Ian Paisley Jr MP (Democratic Unionist) | North Antrim | → | Gregory Campbell MP (Democratic Unionist) | East Londonderry | Hansard |
| 5 December 2016 | Gavin Robinson MP (Democratic Unionist) | Belfast East | → | Jim Shannon MP (Democratic Unionist) | Strangford | Hansard |

== 2010-2015 Parliament ==
The chair was elected on 10 June 2010, with members being announced on 26 July 2010.

| Member | Party | Constituency |
|---|---|---|
| Laurence Robertson MP (Chair) | Conservative | Tewkesbury |
| Joe Benton MP | Labour | Bootle |
| Oliver Colvile MP | Conservative | Plymouth Sutton and Devonport |
| Stephen Hepburn MP | Labour | Jarrow |
| Lady Sylvia Hermon MP | Independent | North Down |
| Ian Lavery MP | Labour | Wansbeck |
| Naomi Long MP | Alliance Party of Northern Ireland | Belfast East |
| Jack Lopresti MP | Conservative | Filton and Bradley Stoke |
| Dr Alasdair McDonnell MP | Social Democratic and Labour Party | Belfast South |
| Ian Paisley Jr MP | Democratic Unionist | North Antrim |
| Stephen Pound MP | Labour | Ealing North |
| David Simpson MP | Democratic Unionist | Upper Bann |
| Mel Stride MP | Conservative | Central Devon |
| Gavin Williamson MP | Conservative | South Staffordshire |

=== Changes 2010-2015 ===
| Date | Outgoing member and party | Constituency | → | New member and party | Constituency | Source |
|---|---|---|---|---|---|---|
| 2 November 2010 | Stephen Pound MP (Labour) | Ealing North | → | Kate Hoey MP (Labour) | Vauxhall | Hansard |
| 24 October 2011 | Ian Lavery MP (Labour) | Wansbeck | → | David Anderson MP (Labour) | Blaydon | Hansard |
| 28 November 2011 | Mel Stride MP (Conservative) | Central Devon | → | Kris Hopkins MP (Conservative) | Keighley | Hansard |
| 28 November 2011 | Gavin Williamson MP (Conservative) | South Staffordshire | → | Nigel Mills MP (Conservative) | Amber Valley | Hansard |
| 24 October 2011 | Kris Hopkins MP (Conservative) | Keighley | → | Andrew Percy MP (Conservative) | Brigg and Goole | Hansard |

== See also ==
- Parliamentary committees of the United Kingdom
- Northern Ireland Grand Committee
