= Alex Baker =

British politician (elected 2024)

Alex Baker MP
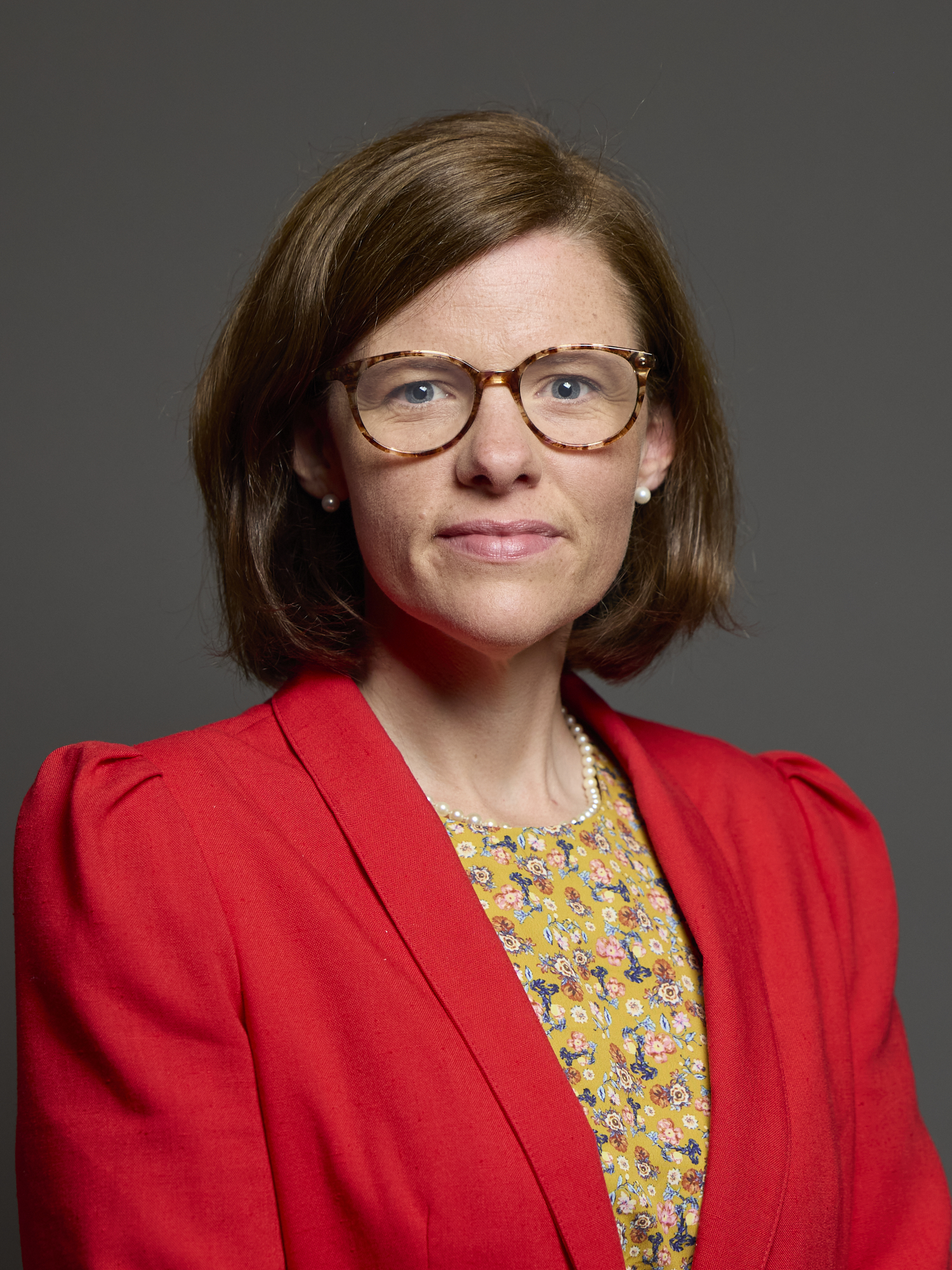
- Official portrait, 2024

Member of Parliament for Aldershot
- Incumbent
- Assumed office 4 July 2024
- Preceded by: Leo Docherty
- Constituency: Aldershot
- Majority: 5,683 (11.7%)

Personal details
- Born: Alexandra Baker; 1982 or 1983 (age 42–43)
- Party: Labour
- Education: University of Birmingham (BA)

Alexandra Baker (born 1982 or 1983) is a Labour politician who has served as Member of Parliament for Aldershot since 2024. She was the first member of the Labour Party and the first woman to be elected to represent Aldershot.

== Early life and career ==
Alex Baker graduated from the University of Birmingham in 2006. Baker worked in multiple jobs at the Battersea Power Station, including director of communities and sustainability. Baker was a political development officer and parliamentary officer for the Co-operative Party and Co-operative Group.

== Parliamentary career ==
In the 2024 general election Baker was elected as the Member of Parliament for Aldershot with a majority of 5,683 votes. Her Conservative predecessor was Leo Docherty. The seat was a target for the Labour Party as it won control of the council in the local elections. Her election made her the first non-Conservative to represent the constituency since its establishment in 1918, and the first women to represent it as well. On 9 October 2024, she made her maiden speech in the House of Commons during a debate on the Renters' Rights Bill.

During Baker's tenure in the House of Commons she has served on the Defence Select Committee. She is the chair of the All-Party Parliamentary Group on Nepal.

== Political positions ==
In 2025, Baker led 96 MPs in signing an open letter stating that environmental, social, and governance policies were limiting defence spending and called for weapons manufacturers to be treated as ethical investments by banks, investors, and pension funds.

Baker voted against the Terminally Ill Adults (End of Life) Bill.

== Personal life ==
Baker has two children.

== Works cited ==
=== News ===
- Gudge, Ethan; Henley, Peter (12 June 2024). "High streets and crime on agenda in key seat". BBC. Archived from the original on 18 June 2025.
- Jolly, Jasper (6 March 2025). "Treat weapons investments as 'ethical' to help arm Ukraine and UK, MPs urge". The Guardian. Archived from the original on 18 June 2025.
- Marshall, Ross (29 November 2024). "How MPs in Hampshire voted on the assisted dying bill". Andover Advertiser. Archived from the original on 18 June 2025.
- Neame, Katie (3 July 2024). "Aldershot: Can Labour win the 'Home of the Army' for the first time in a century?". LabourList. Archived from the original on 18 June 2025.
- Neame, Katie; Jones, Morgan; Belger, Tom (6 June 2024). "Labour selections: parliamentary candidates selected so far for the general election". LabourList. Archived from the original on 18 June 2025.
- Pokharel, Nabin (16 January 2025). "Nepal's climate change issue raised in UK Parliament". The Kathmandu Post. Archived from the original on 18 June 2025.

=== Web ===
- "About Me". Alex Baker. Archived from the original on 18 June 2025.
- "Last election result". House of Commons of the United Kingdom. Archived from the original on 18 June 2025.
- "Parliamentary career". House of Commons of the United Kingdom. Archived from the original on 18 June 2025.

Parliament of the United Kingdom
Preceded by Leo Docherty	Member of Parliament for Aldershot; 2024–present	Incumbent
