= Sarah Atherton =

British politician (born 1967)

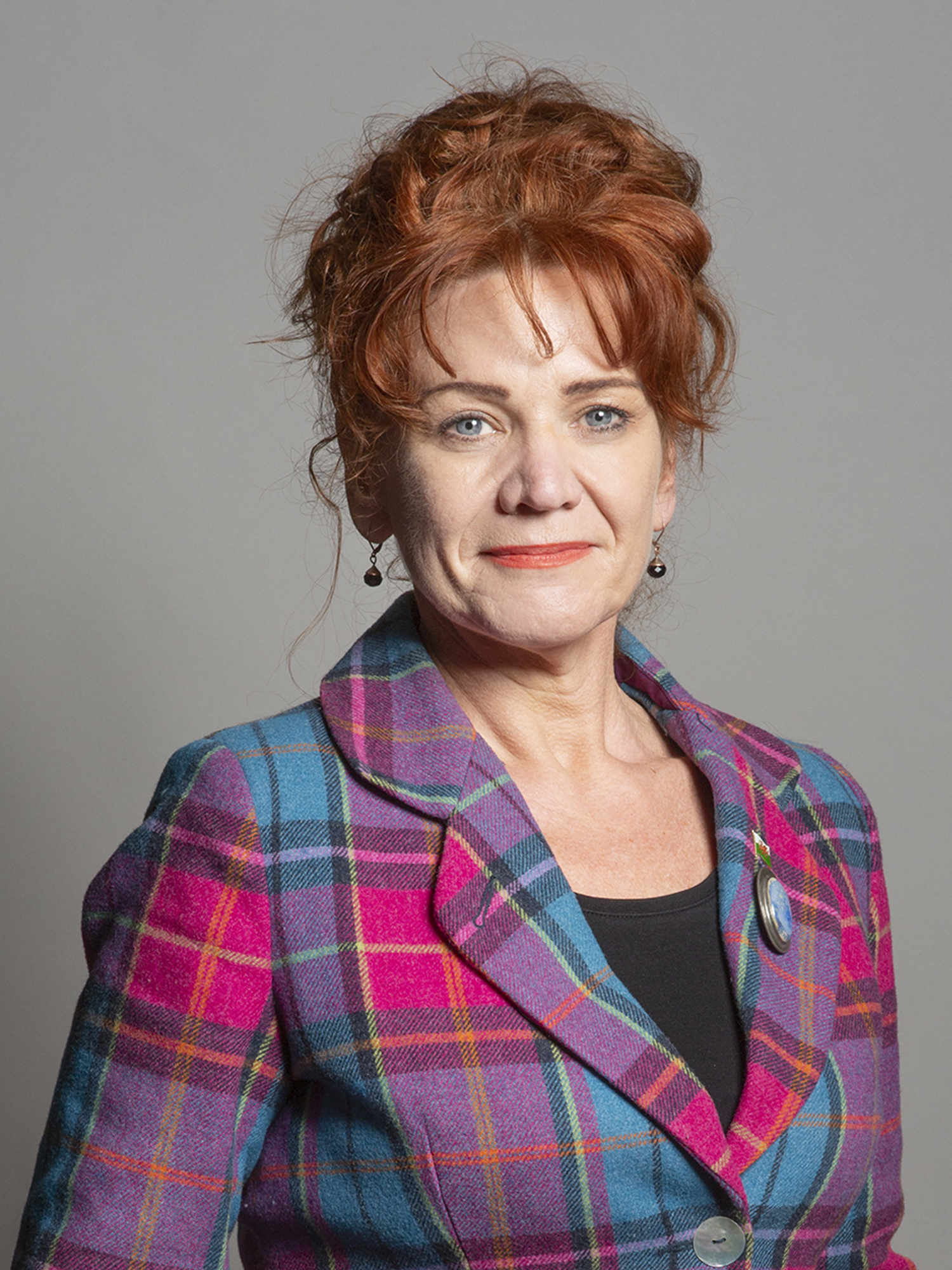
- Official portrait, 2019

Parliamentary Under-Secretary of State for Defence People, Veterans and Service Families
- In office 20 September 2022 – 27 October 2022
- Prime Minister: Liz Truss
- Preceded by: Leo Docherty
- Succeeded by: Andrew Murrison

Member of Parliament for Wrexham
- In office 12 December 2019 – 30 May 2024
- Preceded by: Ian Lucas
- Succeeded by: Andrew Ranger

Personal details
- Born: 15 November 1967 (age 58) Chester, England
- Party: Reform UK (since 2025)
- Other political affiliations: Conservative (until 2025)
- Spouse: Nick Corcoran
- Children: 1
- Education: Liverpool University
- Occupation: Politician

Military service
- Branch/service: British Army
- Unit: Intelligence Corps

Sarah Elizabeth Atherton (born 15 November 1967) is a former British politician who served as the Member of Parliament (MP) for Wrexham between 2019 and 2024. She served as Parliamentary Under-Secretary of State for Defence People, Veterans and Service Families from September to October 2022.

She was the first Conservative to represent the Wrexham constituency since its creation in 1918. In addition, Atherton was the first female MP elected to represent the seat, and became the first female Conservative MP elected to Westminster representing a Welsh constituency.

In 2025, Atherton joined Reform UK.

== Early life and career ==
Atherton was born in Chester in 1967, the daughter of John Atherton from Chester and Evelyn Atherton (née Morgan / Stringer) from Caernarfon. She left Christleton High School in Chester, a local comprehensive school, at the age of 16.

Atherton joined the army, serving in the Intelligence Corps, before training at Bangor University and becoming a Registered General Nurse. She also studied at Manchester Metropolitan University, receiving a BSc (Hons) in Community Health (Specialist District Nurse), and at the University of Liverpool, where she obtained a Masters in Social Work.

Atherton has worked as a nurse, district nurse and social worker. In addition, she was briefly a partner in a micro brewery business based on Wrexham Industrial Estate. Prior to being elected as the Member of Parliament for Wrexham, she served on Gresford Community Council. She is a member of the Royal British Legion.

== Parliamentary career ==
Sarah Atherton was elected as the Member of Parliament for Wrexham in December 2019. She became the first Conservative to represent the constituency since its inception in 1918, turning a Labour majority of 1,832 into a Conservative majority of 2,131. Atherton is the first woman to represent Wrexham but also the first female Conservative MP elected to Westminster from a Welsh constituency. Additionally, she holds the distinction of being the first female MP with a regular military background.

Atherton was a member of the Defence Select Committee, backing a report into the experiences of women in the armed forces. She was also a member of the All-Party Parliamentary Group for Veterans, serving as Vice-Chair of the All-Party Parliamentary Group for Veterans, as well as contributing to also contributes to other defence-focused APPGs, such as for the Armed Forces and the Armed Forces Covenant. Atherton also served as Parliamentary Under Secretary of State (Minister for Defence People, Veterans and Service Families) at the Ministry of Defence from 20 September 2022 to 27 October 2022.

In May 2022, Atherton celebrated the award to Wrexham of city status during the Queen's Platinum Jubilee celebrations, and supported Wrexham to be shortlisted for the UK's City of Culture 2025.

She also served as the Parliamentary Private Secretary to the Secretary of State for Wales, Simon Hart, in February 2020, encouraging discussion on handling cases of sexual abuse within the armed forces in civilian courts.

Atherton was criticised on social media for promoting the re-opening of a McDonald's outlet in Wrexham on her Twitter account, citing childhood obesity and small independent businesses which require help, defending her support with the claim that it was locally franchised and actively involved in community engagement programmes. In August 2020, Atherton suggested on Twitter that the army could be a solution to prevent migrants crossing the English Channel. This proposal received critical feedback from immigration law specialists.

=== Voting record ===
In January 2020, Atherton voted, with the majority of MPs, against an Opposition amendment, "Proportional Representation to Elect MPs in the House of Commons", on the subject of electoral reform and PR.

In February 2020, Atherton voted with the majority of MPs against an Opposition motion on "proper funding of public services along with robust action against tax avoidance and evasion". In the same month she voted with the majority of MPs against an Opposition motion on "a plan to eliminate a substantial majority of transport emissions by 2030".

In July 2020, Atherton voted with the majority of MPs against a Green Party amendment to the Trade Bill, which the proposer said "would aim to protect the NHS and publicly funded health and care services in other parts of the UK from any form of control from outside the UK".

=== Defection to Reform UK ===
In October 2025, Atherton announced she had defected to Reform UK and intended to seek selection as a candidate at the 2026 Senedd election, but was not selected.

== Post-parliamentary career ==
Since leaving Parliament, Atherton was appointed as a Defence Adviser on the Board of Advisors for the Centre for Military Women’s Research at Anglia Ruskin University.

== Personal life ==
In 2014, Atherton married Nicholas John Daniel Corcoran. She has a son.

Parliament of the United Kingdom
Preceded by Ian Lucas	Member of Parliament for Wrexham; 2019–2024	Succeeded by Andrew Ranger
