= Parliamentary Under-Secretary of State for Defence People and Families =

British government minister

United Kingdom Parliamentary Under-Secretary of State for Defence People and Families
- Royal Arms of His Majesty's Government
- Ministry of Defence
- Style: Minister
- Nominator: Prime Minister of the United Kingdom
- Appointer: The Monarch on advice of the Prime Minister
- Term length: At His Majesty's pleasure
- Website: Official website

The Parliamentary Under-Secretary of State for Defence People and Families was a ministerial position in the Ministry of Defence in the British government.

== Responsibilities ==
The minister has the following ministerial responsibilities:

- civilian and service personnel policy
- armed forces pay, pensions and compensation
- Armed Forces Covenant
- welfare and service families
- community engagement
- equality, diversity and inclusion
- mental health
- Defence Medical Services
- the people programme (Flexible Engagement Strategy, Future Accommodation Model and Enterprise Approach)
- estates service family accommodation policy and engagement with welfare

== List of ministers ==
Name	Portrait	Entered office	Left office	Political party	Prime Minister
Role formed out of Parliamentary Under-Secretary of State for Defence People and Veterans Minister for Defence People
Leo Docherty		7 July 2022	7 September	Conservative	Boris Johnson
Parliamentary Under-Secretary of State for Defence People, Veterans and Service Families
Sarah Atherton		20 September 2022	27 October 2022	Conservative	Liz Truss
Parliamentary Under-Secretary of State for Defence People and Families
Andrew Murrison		30 October 2022	5 July 2024	Conservative	Rishi Sunak
