= Leo Docherty =

British politician (born 1976)

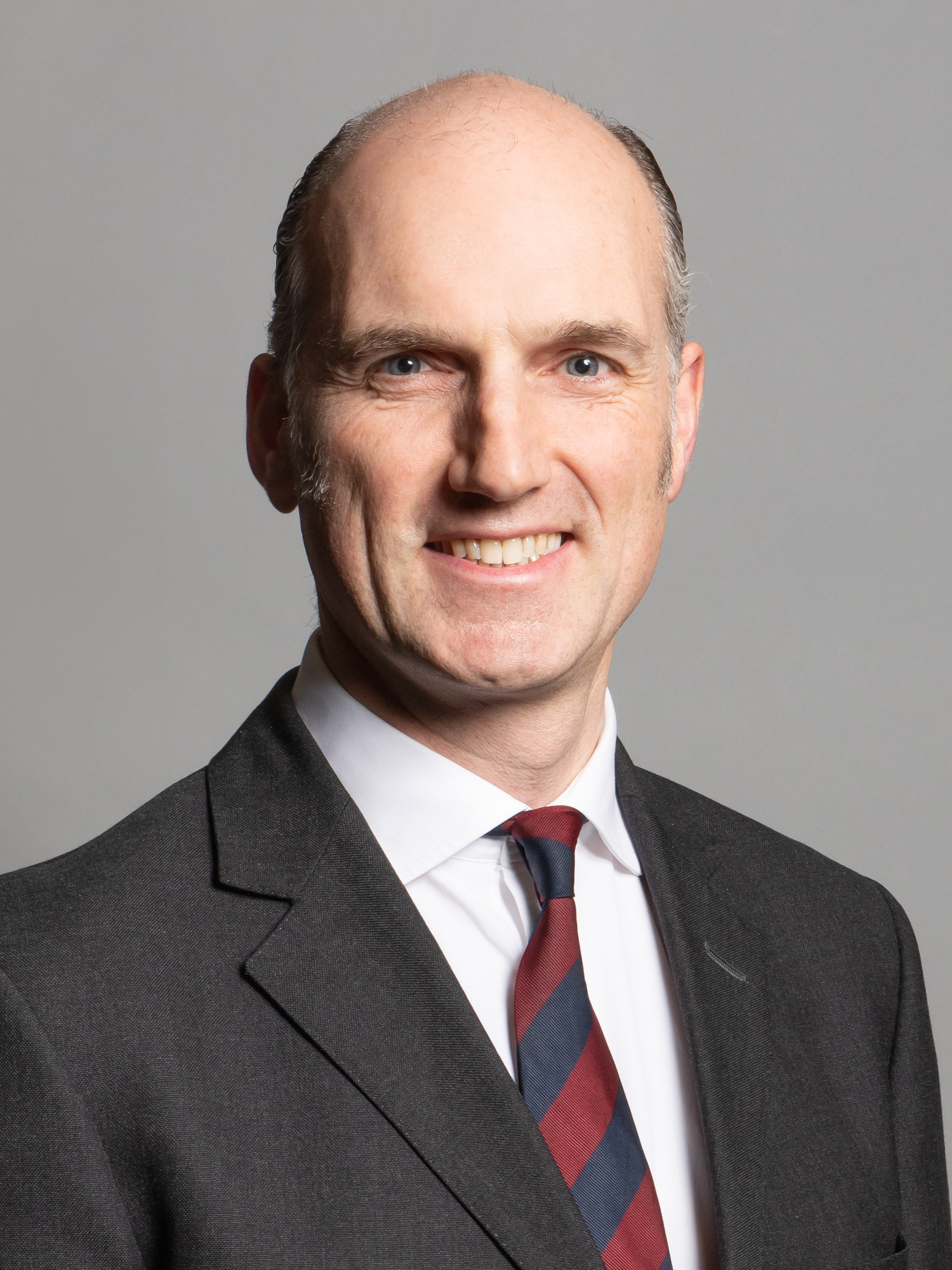
- Docherty in 2020

Minister of State for the Armed Forces
- In office 26 March 2024 – 4 July 2024
- Prime Minister: Rishi Sunak
- Preceded by: James Heappey
- Succeeded by: Luke Pollard

Parliamentary Under-Secretary of State for Europe (Note: As Minister of State for Europe from 7 September 2022 to 27 October 2022.)
- In office 7 September 2022 – 26 March 2024
- Prime Minister: Liz Truss; Rishi Sunak
- Preceded by: Graham Stuart
- Succeeded by: Nus Ghani

Minister for Defence People
- In office 7 July 2022 – 7 September 2022
- Prime Minister: Boris Johnson
- Preceded by: Office established
- Succeeded by: Sarah Atherton

Parliamentary Under-Secretary of State for Defence People and Veterans
- In office 21 April 2021 – 7 July 2022
- Prime Minister: Boris Johnson
- Preceded by: Johnny Mercer
- Succeeded by: Johnny Mercer

Assistant Government Whip
- In office 29 July 2019 – 21 April 2021
- Prime Minister: Boris Johnson

Member of Parliament for Aldershot
- In office 8 June 2017 – 30 May 2024
- Preceded by: Sir Gerald Howarth
- Succeeded by: Alex Baker

Personal details
- Born: 4 October 1976 (age 50) Glasgow, Scotland
- Party: Conservative
- Spouse: Lucy
- Children: 2
- Education: SOAS, University of London; Royal Military Academy Sandhurst
- Military career
- Allegiance: United Kingdom
- Branch: British Army
- Service years: 2002-2006
- Rank: Captain
- Service number: 555125
- Unit: Scots Guards
- Conflicts: Iraq War; War in Afghanistan

Leo Docherty (born 4 October 1976) is a former British Conservative politician who was the Member of Parliament (MP) for Aldershot from 2017 to 2024. He served as Minister of State for the Armed Forces from March to July 2024.

Prior to being elected as an MP, he served in the Scots Guards, before working in publishing and for the Conservative party. He is the author of Desert of Death (2007). Docherty was first elected in 2017 and re-elected in 2019, but was defeated by Alex Baker of the Labour Party in 2024 as part of a large nationwide swing from the Conservatives to Labour, following a defeat in the local elections earlier in the year. This marked the first time since the constituency's creation in 1918 that a non-Conservative MP had been elected.

Doherty served as Minister for Defence People from July 2022 to September 2022. in the Boris Johnson ministry and as Parliamentary Under-Secretary of State for Europe from September 2022 to March 2024. Docherty also served as Minister of State for the Armed Forces at the culmination of the Sunak ministry.

== Early life and career ==
Leo Docherty was born on 4 October 1976 in Glasgow and grew up in Gloucestershire. He studied Swahili and Hindi at SOAS, University of London between 1996 and 2000, before attending the Royal Military Academy Sandhurst the following year. From 2001 to 2007 he served in the Scots Guards. After being posted to London on ceremonial duties and a period spent in Germany, he served operationally in Iraq and Afghanistan as a British Army officer.

After leaving the army, he wrote about his first-hand account of the war in Afghanistan in his book Desert of Death, which was published by Faber in 2007. Living near Didcot, he created and worked as editor and publisher of Steppe magazine - a now defunct publication that covered the arts, culture, history, landscape and people of Central Asia. He was appointed Director of the Conservative Middle East Council in 2010, a role in which he served until being elected as an MP.

Docherty stood successfully as the Conservative candidate in the Hagbourne ward of South Oxfordshire District Council in May 2011, standing down at the end of his four-year term when the wards were revised. He stood unsuccessfully as the Conservative candidate in the Wallingford division of Oxfordshire County Council in May 2017.

== Parliamentary career ==
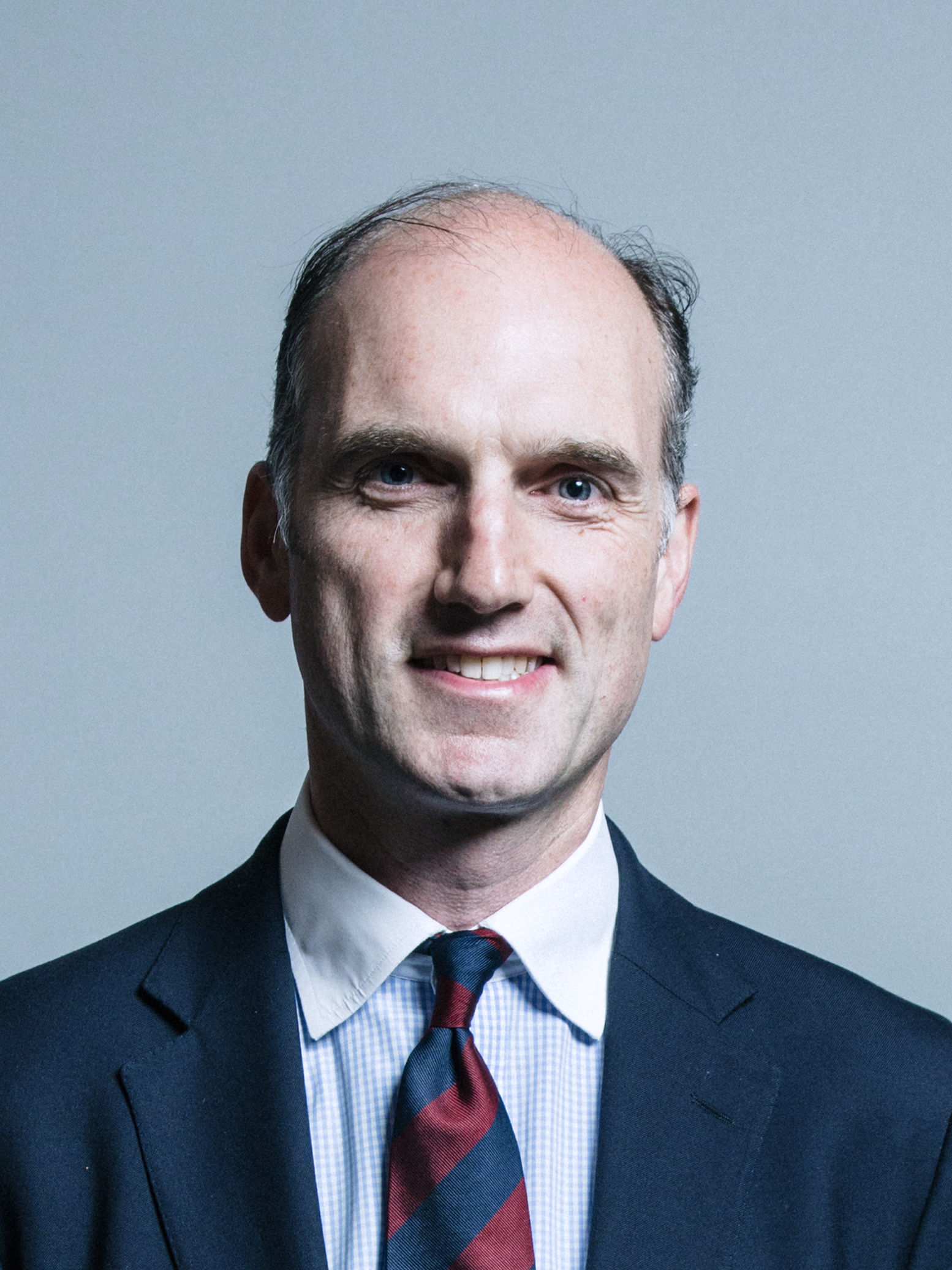
Docherty in 2017

Docherty unsuccessfully applied to be the Conservative candidate for the Labour Party held Oxford East constituency in 2014.

At the 2015 general election, Docherty stood in Caerphilly, coming third with 16.6% of the vote behind the incumbent Labour MP Wayne David and the UKIP candidate.

In April 2017, he was selected as the Conservative candidate for Aldershot. The Financial Times called his selection "the highest-profile tussle over a candidate choice, [in which] the party leadership rejected a request from activists in Aldershot to be allowed to consider Daniel Hannan, the prominent Eurosceptic MEP, for the safe Tory seat". At the snap 2017 general election, Docherty was elected to Parliament as MP for Aldershot with 55.1% of the vote and a majority of 11,518.

In the House of Commons he sat on the Defence Committee and Committees on Arms Export Controls (formerly Quadripartite Committee). Docherty campaigned with fellow Conservatives against the prosecution of veterans following the troubles in Northern Ireland.

He backed Boris Johnson in the 2019 Conservative Party leadership election. On 29 July 2019, Johnson appointed Docherty as an Assistant Government Whip.

In September 2019, Leo's brother Paddy Docherty wrote an open letter to The Guardian urging him to resign, writing: "Now I am simply appalled that this government, of which you are sadly a part, has become the principal threat to the lives and liberties of the people. Please do the decent thing, and resign".

At the 2019 general election, Docherty was re-elected as MP for Aldershot with an increased vote share of 58.4% and an increased majority of 16,698.

On 21 April 2021 Docherty succeeded Johnny Mercer as Parliamentary Under-Secretary of State for Defence People and Veterans. He became Minister for Defence People on 7 July 2022.

On 26 March 2024, Docherty replaced James Heappey as Minister of State for the Armed Forces. He was replaced as Minister of State for Europe by Nus Ghani.

In June 2024, Docherty was reselected as the Conservative candidate for Aldershot at the 2024 general election. He was defeated by Alex Baker of the Labour Party amidst a strong nationwide swing away from the Conservatives.

=== Gulf States ===
As Chair of the Conservative Middle East Council and since serving as an MP, Docherty has frequently praised the work of the governments in Saudi Arabia and Bahrain and has been subject to some criticism from opposition MPs and journalists, such as Peter Oborne for his links and his failure to always declare his register of interests when speaking on the subject in Parliament. However, Docherty has denied any conflict of interest and, as Director of the Conservative Middle East Council, responded to criticism of donations received there as not having influenced decision-making within the group. Docherty's trips were worth £26,893 in total and were the highest valued of any MP's trips during the year following the 2017 general election.

== Post-parliamentary career ==
Following his defeat at the 2024 general election, Docherty has worked as an adviser for International Hospitals Group.

== Personal life ==
He is married to Lucy Docherty and they have two children.

== Campaign medals ==

Iraq Medal	
Operational Service Medal for Afghanistan	With clasp "AFGHANISTAN"

== Publications ==
- Desert of Death. A Soldier's Journey from Iraq to Afghanistan, Faber and Faber, London 2007, ISBN

978-0-571-23688-6

Parliament of the United Kingdom
Preceded by Sir Gerald Howarth	Member of Parliament for Aldershot; 2017–2024	Succeeded by Alex Baker
Political offices
Preceded by Johnny Mercer	Parliamentary Under-Secretary of State for Defence People and Veterans; 2021–2022	Succeeded by Post disestablished
Preceded by New Post	Minister for Defence People; 2022	Succeeded by Sarah Atherton
