= Aldershot (constituency) =

Parliamentary constituency in the United Kingdom, 1918 onwards

Coordinates: 51.284°N 0.756°W

- Borough constituency for the House of Commons
- Boundaries since 2024
- Boundary of Aldershot in South East England
- County: Hampshire
- Population: 103,922 (2011 census)
- Electorate: 76,765 (2023)
- Borough: Aldershot
- Major settlements: Aldershot, Farnborough, Yateley (part)

Current constituency
- Created: 1918
- Member of Parliament: Alex Baker (Labour)
- Seats: One
- Created from: Basingstoke

Aldershot (/ˈɔːldərʃɒt/ AWL-dər-shot) is a constituency in Hampshire represented in the House of Commons of the UK Parliament.

The seat was represented by the Conservative Party from its creation in 1918 to the 2024 general election, when it was won by Alex Baker of the Labour Party.

== Constituency profile ==
The constituency is located in the north-east of Hampshire and includes the towns of Aldershot and Farnborough, the smaller town of Blackwater and the centre and east of Yateley.

The area is strongly associated with the British Armed Forces; Farnborough Airport was formerly used by the Royal Air Force and now primarily serves business aviation, and Aldershot is home to Aldershot Garrison, a military town with a population of over 10,000. The area is more affluent than the national average, with 2021 Census data showing 51.1% of households in Rushmoor district (which contains Aldershot and Farnborough) having no indicators of deprivation compared to 48.3% across England and Wales. Hart district, which includes Blackwater and Yateley, was named the UK's most desirable place to live by Halifax in 2011.

The constituency's population is 79% white but contains a relatively high proportion of Nepalese Buddhists, who make up 4.7% of Rushmoor district's population. This is the highest percentage of any local authority in England and Wales.

== Political history ==
Aldershot elected a Conservative as its MP at every election from its creation in 1918 until the 2024 general election, which was won by Labour.

From 1974 to 2010 (inclusive) Liberal Democrats (or predecessor, Liberals) polled second. From 2015 to 2019 the Labour candidate was runner-up.

The 2015 result saw the seat rank 123rd safest of the Conservative Party's 331 seats by percentage of majority. In June 2016, 57.9% of local adults voting in the EU membership referendum chose to leave the European Union instead of to remain. This was matched in two January 2018 votes in Parliament by its MP.

In the 2017 general election, Leo Docherty won the seat after Sir Gerald Howarth retired. The seat saw a further increase in the Labour vote, achieving its best result since 1970; however this fell back again in 2019. In 2024 Docherty suffered a 23.2% swing against him, one of the highest ever seen at a general election, and Labour's Alex Baker became the first non-Conservative MP to represent the area since 1857.

== Boundaries ==
Map of boundaries 2010–2024

1918–1950: The Urban Districts of Aldershot, Farnborough, and Fleet, and the Rural District of Hartley Wintney.

1950–1974: The Borough of Aldershot, the Urban Districts of Farnborough and Fleet, and the Rural District of Hartley Wintney. The constituency boundaries remained unchanged.

1974–1983: The Borough of Aldershot, the Urban Districts of Farnborough and Fleet, and in the Rural District of Hartley Wintney the parishes of Crondall, Crookham Village, Hawley, and Yateley.

1983–1997: The Borough of Rushmoor, and the District of Hart wards of Eversley, Frogmore and Darby Green, Hartley Wintney, Hawley, Whitewater, Yateley East, Yateley North, and Yateley West.

1997–2010: The Borough of Rushmoor, and the District of Hart wards of Frogmore and Darby Green, Hawley, Yateley East, Yateley North, and Yateley West.

2010–2024: The Borough of Rushmoor, and the District of Hart wards of Blackwater and Hawley, and Frogmore and Darby Green. (Note: Wards were in the interim period reformed as their primary purpose is that of local government, see wards of the United Kingdom)

2024–present: Further to the 2023 periodic review of Westminster constituencies which became effective for the 2024 general election, the constituency is composed of the following (as they existed on 1 December 2020):

- The District of Hart wards of: Blackwater and Hawley; Yateley East.
- The Borough of Rushmoor.

Small expansion in boundaries to take account of changes to the ward structure in the District of Hart.

== Members of Parliament ==
Basingstoke prior to 1918

Election	Member	Party
1918	Viscount Wolmer	Conservative
1940 by-election	Oliver Lyttelton	Conservative
1954 by-election	Eric Errington	Conservative
1970	Julian Critchley	Conservative
1997	Gerald Howarth	Conservative
2017	Leo Docherty	Conservative
2024	Alex Baker	Labour

== Elections ==
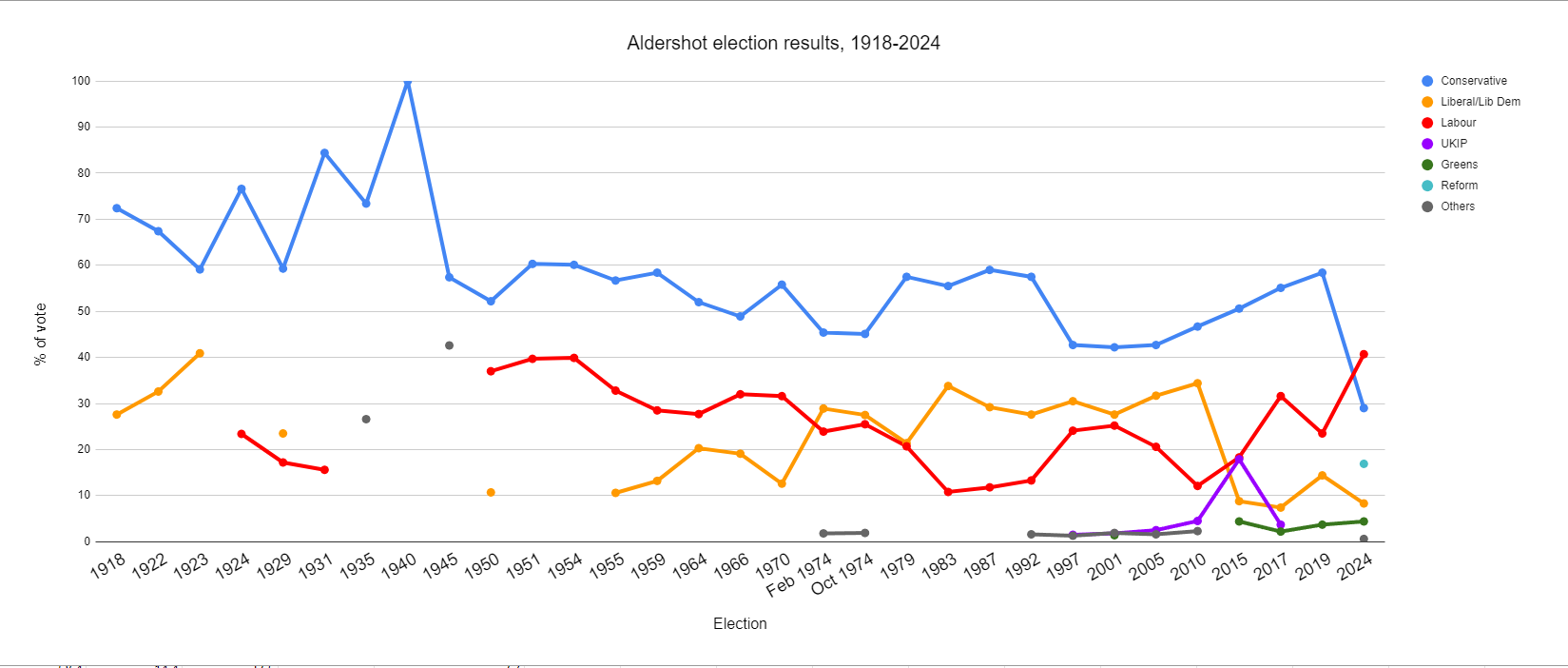
Graph of election results in aldershot from 1918–2024

=== Elections in the 2020s ===
2024 general election: Aldershot
Party	Candidate	Votes	%	±%
Labour	Alex Baker	19,764	40.7	▲18.6
Conservative	Leo Docherty	14,081	29.0	▼27.8
Reform	Trevor Lloyd-Jones	8,210	16.9	new
Liberal Democrats	Paul Harris	4,052	8.3	▼9.2
Green	Ed Neville	2,155	4.4	▲0.9
Hampshire Ind.	Steve James-Bailey	282	0.6	new
Majority		5,683	11.7	
Turnout		48,544	61.8	▼5.7
Registered electors		78,569		
Labour gain from Conservative		Swing	▲23.2	

=== Elections in the 2010s ===
2019 notional result
Party	Vote	%
Conservative	29,453	56.8
Labour	11,468	22.1
Liberal Democrats	9,068	17.5
Green	1,839	3.5
Turnout	51,828	67.5
Electorate	76,765	

2019 general election: Aldershot
Party	Candidate	Votes	%	±%
Conservative	Leo Docherty	27,980	58.4	+3.3
Labour	Howard Kaye	11,282	23.5	−8.1
Liberal Democrats	Alan Hilliar	6,920	14.4	+7.0
Green	Donna Wallace	1,750	3.7	+1.5
Majority		16,698	34.9	+11.4
Turnout		47,932	66.0	+1.8
Registered electors		72,617		
Conservative hold		Swing	+5.7	

2017 general election: Aldershot
Party	Candidate	Votes	%	±%
Conservative	Leo Docherty	26,950	55.1	+4.5
Labour	Gary Puffett	15,477	31.6	+13.3
Liberal Democrats	Alan Hilliar	3,637	7.4	−1.4
UKIP	Roy Swales	1,796	3.7	−14.2
Green	Donna Wallace	1,090	2.2	−2.2
Majority		11,518	23.5	−8.8
Turnout		48,995	64.2	+0.4
Registered electors		76,205		
Conservative hold		Swing	−4.4	

2015 general election: Aldershot
Party	Candidate	Votes	%	±%
Conservative	Gerald Howarth	23,369	50.6	+3.9
Labour	Gary Puffett	8,468	18.3	+6.2
UKIP	Bill Walker	8,253	17.9	+13.4
Liberal Democrats	Alan Hilliar	4,076	8.8	−25.6
Green	Carl Hewitt	2,025	4.4	N/A
Majority		14,901	32.3	+20.0
Turnout		46,191	63.8	+0.3
Registered electors		72,430		
Conservative hold		Swing	−1.2	

2010 general election: Aldershot
Party	Candidate	Votes	%	±%
Conservative	Gerald Howarth	21,203	46.7	+2.7
Liberal Democrats	Adrian Collett	15,617	34.4	+5.5
Labour	Jonathan Slater	5,489	12.1	−9.6
UKIP	Robert Snare	2,041	4.5	+2.1
English Independence Party	Gary Cowd	803	1.8	N/A
Christian	Juliana Brimicombe	231	0.5	N/A
Majority		5,586	12.3	+1.2
Turnout		45,384	63.5	−0.1
Registered electors		71,465		
Conservative hold		Swing	−1.4	

=== Elections in the 2000s ===
2005 general election: Aldershot
Party	Candidate	Votes	%	±%
Conservative	Gerald Howarth	20,572	42.7	+0.5
Liberal Democrats	Adrian Collett	15,238	31.7	+4.1
Labour	Howard Linsley	9,895	20.6	−4.6
UKIP	Derek Rumsey	1,182	2.5	+0.7
English Democrat	Gary Cowd	701	1.5	N/A
Monster Raving Loony	Howling Laud Hope	553	1.1	+0.2
Majority		5,334	11.0	−3.6
Turnout		48,141	61.3	+3.4
Registered electors		78,803		
Conservative hold		Swing	−1.8	

2001 general election: Aldershot
Party	Candidate	Votes	%	±%
Conservative	Gerald Howarth	19,106	42.2	−0.5
Liberal Democrats	Adrian Collett	12,512	27.6	−2.9
Labour	Luke Akehurst	11,394	25.2	+1.1
UKIP	Derek Rumsey	797	1.8	+0.3
Green	Adam Stacey	630	1.4	N/A
Independent	Arthur Uther Pendragon	459	1.0	N/A
Monster Raving Loony	Howling Laud Hope	390	0.9	N/A
Majority		6,594	14.6	+2.4
Turnout		45,288	57.9	−12.9
Registered electors		78,255		
Conservative hold		Swing	0.0	

=== Elections in the 1990s ===
1997 general election: Aldershot
Party	Candidate	Votes	%	±%
Conservative	Gerald Howarth	23,119	42.7	−14.8
Liberal Democrats	Adrian Collett	16,498	30.5	+2.9
Labour	Terence Bridgeman	13,057	24.1	+10.8
UKIP	John Howe	794	1.5	N/A
Independent	Arthur Uther Pendragon	361	0.7	N/A
BNP	Donald Stevens	322	0.6	N/A
Majority		6,621	12.2	−17.6
Turnout		54,151	70.8	−7.9
Registered electors		76,499		
Conservative hold		Swing	−8.9	

1992 general election: Aldershot
Party	Candidate	Votes	%	±%
Conservative	Julian Critchley	36,974	57.5	−1.5
Liberal Democrats	Adrian Collett	17,786	27.6	−1.6
Labour	John Smith	8,552	13.3	+1.5
Liberal	David H. Robinson	1,038	1.6	N/A
Majority		19,188	29.8	0.0
Turnout		64,350	78.7	+4.7
Registered electors		81,754		
Conservative hold		Swing	0.0	

=== Elections in the 1980s ===
1987 general election: Aldershot
Party	Candidate	Votes	%	±%
Conservative	Julian Critchley	35,272	59.0	+3.5
Liberal	Roger Hargreaves	17,488	29.2	−4.6
Labour	Ian Pearson	7,061	11.8	+1.0
Majority		17,784	29.8	+8.1
Turnout		59,822	74.0	+1.3
Registered electors		80,797		
Conservative hold		Swing	+4.1	

1983 general election: Aldershot
Party	Candidate	Votes	%	±%
Conservative	Julian Critchley	31,288	55.5	−2.0
Liberal	Nicholas Westbrook	19,070	33.8	+12.4
Labour	Alexander Crawford	6,070	10.8	−9.9
Majority		12,218	21.7	−14.4
Turnout		56,425	72.7	−3.8
Registered electors		77,593		
Conservative hold		Swing	−7.2	

=== Elections in the 1970s ===
1979 general election: Aldershot
Party	Candidate	Votes	%	±%
Conservative	Julian Critchley	38,014	57.5	+12.4
Liberal	Nicholas Westbrook	14,438	21.4	−6.1
Labour	Dennis Somerville	13,698	20.7	−4.8
Majority		23,576	36.1	+18.5
Turnout		66,150	76.5	+3.7
Registered electors		86,516		
Conservative hold		Swing	+9.3	

October 1974 general election: Aldershot
Party	Candidate	Votes	%	±%
Conservative	Julian Critchley	26,463	45.1	−0.3
Liberal	A.M. Burton	16,104	27.5	−1.4
Labour	E.P. Sudworth	14,936	25.5	+1.6
National Front	T. Greenslade	1,120	1.9	+0.1
Majority		10,359	17.6	+1.1
Turnout		58,620	72.8	−8.4
Registered electors		80,522		
Conservative hold		Swing	−0.9	

February 1974 general election: Aldershot
Party	Candidate	Votes	%	±%
Conservative	Julian Critchley	29,401	45.4	−10.2
Liberal	G. Floyd	18,743	28.9	+16.3
Labour	W.L.J.T. Card	15,492	23.9	−7.9
National Front	T. Greenslade	1,148	1.8	N/A
Majority		10,658	16.5	+7.8
Turnout		64,781	81.2	+10.3
Registered electors		79,761		
Conservative hold		Swing	−13.3	

1970 general election: Aldershot
Party	Candidate	Votes	%	±%
Conservative	Julian Critchley	33,447	55.8	+6.9
Labour	Roger T. Bogg	18,916	31.6	−0.4
Liberal	Philip M. Gibbons	7,551	12.6	−6.5
Majority		14,531	24.2	+7.2
Turnout		59,909	70.9	−4.5
Registered electors		84,511		
Conservative hold		Swing	+3.7	

=== Elections in the 1960s ===
1966 general election: Aldershot
Party	Candidate	Votes	%	±%
Conservative	Eric Errington	25,672	48.9	−3.1
Labour	Derrick Harold Silvester	16,776	32.0	+4.3
Liberal	Gerald Edward Owen	10,025	19.1	−1.2
Majority		8,896	17.0	−7.4
Turnout		52,473	75.4	+0.3
Registered electors		69,612		
Conservative hold		Swing	+3.7	

1964 general election: Aldershot
Party	Candidate	Votes	%	±%
Conservative	Eric Errington	25,797	52.0	−6.4
Labour	Elizabeth K. Collard	13,718	27.7	−0.8
Liberal	Gerald Edward Owen	10,066	20.3	+7.1
Majority		12,079	24.3	−5.5
Turnout		49,581	75.0	−0.9
Registered electors		66,098		
Conservative hold		Swing	+3.6	

=== Elections in the 1950s ===
1959 general election: Aldershot
Party	Candidate	Votes	%	±%
Conservative	Eric Errington	25,161	58.4	+1.7
Labour	Roy E. Brooks	12,270	28.5	−4.3
Liberal	Enid Lakeman	5,679	13.2	+2.6
Majority		12,891	29.9	+6.0
Turnout		43,110	75.9	+2.0
Registered electors		56,820		
Conservative hold		Swing	+3.0	

1955 general election: Aldershot
Party	Candidate	Votes	%	±%
Conservative	Eric Errington	22,701	56.7	−3.6
Labour	Julian D. Richards	13,129	32.8	−6.9
Liberal	Enid Lakeman	4,232	10.6	N/A
Majority		9,572	23.9	+3.7
Turnout		40,062	73.9	−3.9
Registered electors		54,209		
Conservative hold		Swing	−5.3	

1954 Aldershot by-election
Party	Candidate	Votes	%	±%
Conservative	Eric Errington	19,108	60.1	−0.2
Labour	William Cuthbertson	12,701	39.9	+0.2
Majority		6,407	20.2	−0.4
Turnout		31,809	58.7	−19.1
Conservative hold		Swing	−0.2	

1951 general election: Aldershot
Party	Candidate	Votes	%	±%
Conservative	Oliver Lyttelton	24,951	60.3	+8.1
Labour	Robert N. Hales	16,402	39.7	+2.7
Majority		8,549	20.6	+5.4
Turnout		41,353	77.8	−1.9
Registered electors		53,123		
Conservative hold		Swing	+5.4	

1950 general election: Aldershot
Party	Candidate	Votes	%	±%
Conservative	Oliver Lyttelton	21,238	52.2	−5.2
Labour	N.F. Hidden	15,066	37.0	+2.7
Liberal	John Henry Gooden	4,355	10.7	N/A
Majority		6,172	15.2	+0.4
Turnout		40,659	79.7	−1.9
Registered electors		50,991		
Conservative hold		Swing	+3.8	

=== Elections in the 1940s ===
1945 general election: Aldershot
Party	Candidate	Votes	%	±%
Conservative	Oliver Lyttelton	19,456	57.4	−16.0
Common Wealth	Tom Wintringham	14,435	42.6	N/A
Majority		5,021	14.8	−32.0
Turnout		33,891	69.2	+10.8
Registered electors		48,987		
Conservative hold		Swing		

1940 Aldershot by-election
Party	Candidate	Votes	%	±%
Conservative	Oliver Lyttelton	Unopposed		
Conservative hold				

=== Elections in the 1930s ===
1935 general election: Aldershot
Party	Candidate	Votes	%	±%
Conservative	Roundell Palmer	17,730	73.4	−11.0
Independent Progressive	Gerald Bailey	6,421	26.6	N/A
Majority		11,309	46.8	−22.0
Turnout		24,151	58.4	−7.2
Registered electors		41,376		
Conservative hold		Swing		

1931 general election: Aldershot
Party	Candidate	Votes	%	±%
Conservative	Roundell Palmer	22,134	84.4	+25.1
Labour	Mary Richardson	4,091	15.6	−1.6
Majority		18,043	68.8	+33.0
Turnout		26,225	65.6	−2.9
Conservative hold		Swing		

=== Elections in the 1920s ===
1929 general election: Aldershot
Party	Candidate	Votes	%	±%
Unionist	Roundell Palmer	15,123	59.3	−17.3
Liberal	Henry Fabian Orpen	5,984	23.5	N/A
Labour	J.R. McPhie	4,389	17.2	−6.2
Majority		9,139	35.8	−17.4
Turnout		25,496	68.5	+0.3
Unionist hold		Swing		

1924 general election: Aldershot
Party	Candidate	Votes	%	±%
Unionist	Roundell Palmer	14,081	76.6	+17.5
Labour	Hubert Beaumont	4,313	23.4	N/A
Majority		9,768	53.2	+35.0
Turnout		18,394	68.2	+8.6
Unionist hold		Swing		

1923 general election: Aldershot
Party	Candidate	Votes	%	±%
Unionist	Roundell Palmer	9,131	59.1	−8.3
Liberal	Alfred Suenson-Taylor	6,315	40.9	+8.3
Majority		2,816	18.2	−16.6
Turnout		15,446	59.6	−5.2
Unionist hold		Swing	−8.3	

1922 general election: Aldershot
Party	Candidate	Votes	%	±%
Unionist	Roundell Palmer	10,952	67.4	−5.0
Liberal	Harry Ainger	5,296	32.6	+5.0
Majority		5,656	34.8	−10.0
Turnout		16,248	64.8	+16.8
Unionist hold		Swing	−5.0	

=== Elections in the 1910s ===
1918 general election: Aldershot
Party		Candidate	Votes	%	±%
C	Unionist	Roundell Palmer	8,755	72.4	
	Liberal	Harry Ainger	3,342	27.6	
Majority			5,413	44.8	
Turnout			12,097	48.0	
	Unionist win (new seat)				
C indicates candidate endorsed by the coalition government.

== See also ==
- List of parliamentary constituencies in Hampshire
- List of parliamentary constituencies in the South East England (region)
