= Parliamentary Under-Secretary of State for Overseas Territories, Caribbean, Global Tech and AI =

United Kingdom government ministerial position in the Foreign Office

United Kingdom Parliamentary Under-Secretary of State for Overseas Territories, Caribbean, Global Tech and AI
- Royal Arms of His Majesty's Government

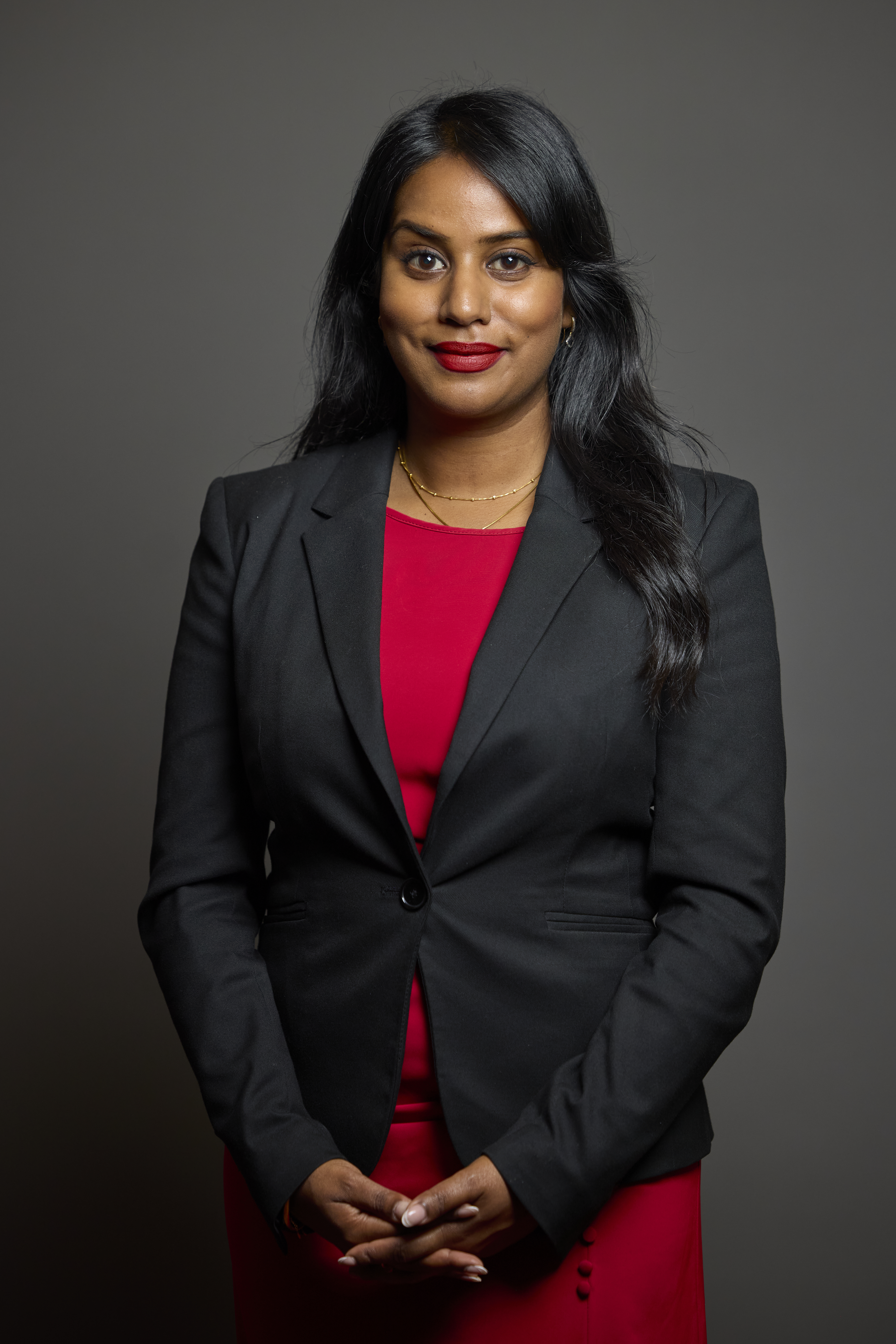
- Incumbent; Uma Kumaran since 22 July 2026
- Foreign, Commonwealth and Development Office
- Style: Minister
- Reports to: Foreign Secretary
- Nominator: Prime Minister
- Appointer: The King (on the advice of the Prime Minister)
- Term length: At His Majesty's pleasure
- Website: Official website

The Parliamentary Under-Secretary of State for Overseas Territories, Caribbean, Global Tech and AI is a mid-level position in His Majesty's Government based in the Foreign, Commonwealth and Development Office.

== History ==
The office was known as Minister of State for Asia and the Pacific under Mark Field and Parliamentary Under-Secretary of State for Asia and the Pacific from Henry Bellingham to Alok Sharma and under Heather Wheeler. The office was known as Minister of State for Asia under Nigel Adams and Amanda Milling and later Minister of State for Asia and the Middle East when it was held by Milling.

When held by The Lord Goldsmith of Richmond Park, the office was known as Minister of State for Asia, Energy, Climate and Environment between September and October 2022 and Minister of State for Overseas Territories, Commonwealth, Energy, Climate and Environment from October 2022 to June 2023.

== List ==
Name	Portrait	Term of office		Political party	P.M.	F.Sec.
Parliamentary Under-Secretary of State for Asia and the Pacific Role formed out of Parliamentary Under-Secretary of State for Europe and Asia
Henry Bellingham		14 May 2010	5 September 2012	Conservative	Cameron	Hague
Mark Simmonds		5 September 2012	11 August 2014	Conservative	Cameron	Hague
James Duddridge		11 August 2014	15 July 2015	Conservative	Cameron	Hague
Grant Shapps		15 July 2015	26 October 2015	Conservative	Cameron	Hammond
James Duddridge		26 October 2015	17 July 2016	Conservative	Cameron	Hammond
Alok Sharma		17 July 2016	13 June 2017	Conservative	May	Johnson
Minister of State for Asia and the Pacific
Mark Field		13 June 2017	25 July 2019 (Note: Suspended from 21 June 2019)	Conservative	May	Johnson; Hunt
Parliamentary Under-Secretary of State for Asia and the Pacific
Heather Wheeler		26 July 2019	13 February 2020	Conservative	Johnson	Raab
Minister of State for Asia
Nigel Adams		13 February 2020	15 September 2021	Conservative	Johnson	Raab
Amanda Milling		16 September 2021	8 February 2022	Conservative	Johnson	Truss
Minister of State for Asia and the Middle East
Amanda Milling		8 February 2022	7 September 2022	Conservative	Johnson	Truss
Minister of State for Asia, Energy, Climate and Environment (Jointly with Department for Environment, Food and Rural Affairs)
Zac Goldsmith, Baron Goldsmith of Richmond Park		22 September 2022	25 October 2022	Conservative	Truss	Cleverly
Minister of State for Overseas Territories, Commonwealth, Energy, Climate and Environment (Jointly with Department for Environment, Food and Rural Affairs)
Zac Goldsmith, Baron Goldsmith of Richmond Park		25 October 2022	30 June 2023	Conservative	Sunak	Cleverly
Minister of State for Climate, Environment and Energy (Jointly with Department for Environment, Food and Rural Affairs)
Richard Benyon, Baron Benyon		14 November 2023	5 July 2024	Conservative	Sunak	Cameron
Parliamentary Under-Secretary of State for Overseas Territories, Caribbean, Global Tech and AI
Uma Kumaran		22 July 2026	Incumbent	Labour	Burnham	Miliband

== See also ==
- Foreign, Commonwealth and Development Office
- Secretary of State for Foreign, Commonwealth and Development Affairs
- Minister of State for Europe
- Minister of State for Foreign Affairs (United Kingdom)
- Under-Secretary of State for Foreign Affairs
- Minister of State for Middle East and North Africa
