= Amanda Milling =

British politician (born 1975)

The Right Honourable Dame Amanda Milling DBE
- Official portrait, 2021

Lord Commissioner of the Treasury
- In office 13 November 2023 – 5 July 2024
- Prime Minister: Rishi Sunak

Minister of State for Asia and the Middle East (Note: Minister of State for Asia until February 2022.)
- In office 16 September 2021 – 7 September 2022
- Prime Minister: Boris Johnson
- Preceded by: Nigel Adams
- Succeeded by: Zac Goldsmith (Note: As Minister of State for Asia, Energy, Climate and Environment. The Lord Ahmad of Wimbledon assumed responsibility for the Middle East.)

Chairman of the Conservative Party
- In office 13 February 2020 – 15 September 2021 Serving with Ben Elliot
- Leader: Boris Johnson
- Preceded by: James Cleverly
- Succeeded by: Oliver Dowden

Minister without Portfolio
- In office 13 February 2020 – 15 September 2021
- Prime Minister: Boris Johnson
- Preceded by: James Cleverly
- Succeeded by: Oliver Dowden

Government Deputy Chief Whip Treasurer of the Household
- In office 28 July 2019 – 13 February 2020
- Prime Minister: Boris Johnson
- Preceded by: Chris Pincher
- Succeeded by: Stuart Andrew

Member of Parliament for Cannock Chase
- In office 7 May 2015 – 30 May 2024
- Preceded by: Aidan Burley
- Succeeded by: Josh Newbury

Personal details
- Born: 12 March 1975 (age 51) Burton upon Trent, Staffordshire, England
- Party: Conservative
- Education: University College London
- Website: www.amandamilling.com

Dame Amanda Anne Milling (born 12 March 1975) is a British politician who served as Member of Parliament (MP) for Cannock Chase from the 2015 general election until losing her seat in 2024. She served as Minister without Portfolio in the UK cabinet and, alongside Ben Elliot, as Chairman of the Conservative Party from February 2020 to September 2021. She also served as Minister of State for Asia and the Middle East from September 2021 to September 2022. She previously worked in market research.

== Early life and career ==
Milling was born on 12 March 1975 in Burton upon Trent, Staffordshire, England. She attended Moreton Hall School, an independent day school in Shropshire. Milling then studied economics and statistics at University College London, graduating in 1997. Milling joined the Conservative Party while at university. Following university, Milling joined market research firm SW1 Research. She left the company in 1999 to join Quaestor where she eventually became a director. Milling then worked as head of clients for Optimisa Research between 2010 and 2014.

== Political career ==
Milling was elected as a Conservative councillor for the Helmshore ward on the Rossendale Borough Council in Lancashire in 2009. Three years later she was promoted to deputy group leader on the council. She resigned her seat in 2014 after her selection as the Conservative candidate for the Cannock Chase constituency in Staffordshire. The incumbent Conservative MP Aidan Burley had previously announced that he would be standing down at the next election.

In the 2015 general election, she was elected with a majority of 4,923 (10.5%). The following year, Milling was one of a number of MPs investigated by the Electoral Commission and the police for allegedly breaching spending regulations in the election. The Commission fined the Conservative Party £70,000 in March 2017 for "significant failures" in its reporting of campaign spending. After completing their investigation, the police referred the matter to the Crown Prosecution Service who concluded that, although there was evidence of inaccuracy in the reporting of spending, they would not take further action as it was not clear that candidates or agents had knowingly acted dishonestly.

During the 2015–2017 parliament, Milling served on the Business, Energy and Industrial Strategy Committee, Education, Skills and the Economy Sub-Committee. Parliamentary enquiries that she was part of include the collapse of BHS, and the working practices at Sports Direct. She also served on Bill Committees including for the Welfare Reform and Work Bill and Policing and Crime Bill.

Milling supported the UK remaining within the European Union in the 2016 UK EU membership referendum. After the referendum, she helped to organise Boris Johnson's 2016 Conservative leadership campaign. In the 2017 general election, she was re-elected with an increased majority of 8,391 (17.6%). She was made an assistant government whip during the reshuffle on 9 January 2018. Milling voted for then Prime Minister Theresa May's Brexit withdrawal agreement in early 2019.

After the election of Johnson as prime minister in July 2019, she was appointed as Deputy Chief Whip and Treasurer of the Household in his ministry. She voted for Johnson's Brexit withdrawal agreement in October 2019. In the 2019 general election, she was re-elected with an increased majority of 19,879 (42.9%). As part of the 2020 cabinet reshuffle, Milling was promoted to Chairman of the Conservative Party and Minister without Portfolio.

At the 2021 British cabinet reshuffle, Milling was made the new Minister of State for Asia and the Middle East, making her the only cabinet minister to leave the cabinet whilst remaining part of the government. In May 2022, she visited the British Virgin Islands (BVI), an overseas territory, following the arrest by the Drug Enforcement Administration of former premier, Andrew Fahie, for alleged drug trafficking and smuggling in Miami, Florida. The following month, the government decided not to impose direct rule which had been recommended by the BVI's governor John Rankin as part of an inquiry into governance in the territory in April 2022 but instead allow time for reform by the local government overseen by Rankin.

Milling endorsed Nadhim Zahawi during the July 2022 Conservative Party leadership election. She was succeeded as Minister of State for Asia by Zac Goldsmith and as Minister of State for the Middle East by Tariq Ahmad, Baron Ahmad of Wimbledon in September 2022.

In the November 2023 British cabinet reshuffle, Milling was appointed a Lord Commissioner of the Treasury. She lost her seat in the 2024 general election to Labour Party candidate Josh Newbury.

She joined the Tees Valley Combined Authority Independent Advisory Board and became a consultant for polling research firm JL Partners in 2025.

== Honours ==
Milling became a Privy Counsellor in February 2020, entitling her to the honorific The Right Honourable for life.

She was appointed Dame Commander of the Order of the British Empire (DBE) on 9 June 2023 as part of the 2022 Prime Minister's Resignation Honours.

== Notes ==
Parliament of the United Kingdom
Preceded by Aidan Burley	Member of Parliament for Cannock Chase; 2015–2024	Succeeded by Josh Newbury
Political offices
Preceded by Chris Pincher	Treasurer of the Household; Government Deputy Chief Whip in the House of Commons; 2019–2020	Succeeded by Stuart Andrew
Preceded by James Cleverly	Minister without Portfolio; 2020–2021	Succeeded by Oliver Dowden
Preceded by Nigel Adams	Minister of State for Asia; 2021–2022	Succeeded by The Lord Goldsmith of Richmond Park
Party political offices
Preceded by Chris Pincher	Conservative Deputy Chief Whip in the House of Commons; 2019–2020	Succeeded by Stuart Andrew
Preceded by James Cleverly; Ben Elliot	Chairman of the Conservative Party; Serving with Ben Elliot; 2020–2021	Succeeded by Oliver Dowden
