= Cannock Chase (constituency) =

UK Parliament constituency (since 1997)

Coordinates: 52.72°N 1.98°W

- Borough constituency for the House of Commons
- Interactive map of boundaries from 2024
- Boundary of Cannock Chase in West Midlands region
- County: Staffordshire
- Population: 97,462 (2011 census)
- Electorate: 75,582 (2023)
- Major settlements: Cannock, Hednesford, Rugeley

Current constituency
- Created: 1997
- Member of Parliament: Josh Newbury (Labour)
- Seats: One
- Created from: Cannock and Burntwood, Mid Staffordshire

Cannock Chase is a constituency (Note: A borough constituency (for the purposes of election expenses and type of returning officer)) in Staffordshire represented in the House of Commons of the UK Parliament since 2024 by Josh Newbury of the Labour Party. (Note: As with all constituencies, the constituency elects one Member of Parliament (MP) by the first past the post system of election at least every five years.)

== Constituency profile ==
The Cannock Chase constituency is located in Staffordshire and is coterminous with the Cannock Chase local government district. The constituency is based around the connected towns of Cannock and Hednesford, which together have a population of around 63,000. It also includes the market town of Rugeley and the village of Norton Canes. The constituency is named after Cannock Chase, a forested area lying between Hednesford and Rugeley that has been designated a National Landscape. Like the nearby Black Country, the Cannock area has a history of coal mining.

In Cannock Chase, house prices, income and levels of education and professional employment are all lower than national averages. Parts of Cannock have high levels of deprivation, whilst there are some affluent areas like Heath Hayes and Wimblebury. At the local district council, most of Cannock is represented by Labour Party councillors whilst the northern areas of the district elected Conservatives and Greens. At the county council, the entirety of Cannock Chase is represented by Reform UK councillors. Voters in the constituency overwhelmingly supported leaving the European Union in the 2016 referendum; an estimated 69% voted in favour of Brexit, placing Cannock Chase in the top 30 most Brexit-supporting constituencies out of 650 nationwide.

== Boundaries ==
1997–2010: The District of Cannock Chase, and the District of South Staffordshire ward of Huntington.

2010–present: The District of Cannock Chase.

The 2023 Periodic Review of Westminster constituencies left the boundaries unchanged.

The constituency contains three towns, Cannock, Rugeley, and Hednesford, with several pit villages, and the Chase itself situated between Hednesford and Rugeley. Since 2010 the seat has broadly the same boundaries as the 1974–1983 seat of Cannock.

Prior to 1997, Cannock and Hednesford were part of the Cannock and Burntwood constituency, while Rugeley was part of the Mid Staffordshire constituency. Between 1997 and 2010 the village of Huntington was part of the constituency though it was part of South Staffordshire local government district.

== History ==
Created for the 1997 election, the seat has since become a bellwether, often with substantial swings. The Labour Party held the seat for 13 years until Aidan Burley of the Conservative Party was elected at the 2010 general election with a large 14% swing, which was the second largest Labour to Conservative swing at that election. Amanda Milling, who was elected in the next election, subsequently held the seat and increased the Conservative majority in both 2015 and 2017. In 2019, the Conservative majority increased to nearly 20,000 votes. However, the seat was regained by Labour in their landslide victory in the 2024 general election, taking the seat from the Conservatives after 14 years on a 25% swing; it became the largest majority in percentage terms (42.9%) to be overturned in that election.

== Members of Parliament ==
Election	Member	Party
1997	Tony Wright (Note: Tony Wright, a Chairman of the Public Administration Select Committee (1999 to 2010), was the Labour MP for Cannock Chase from 1997 to 2010, and for Cannock and Burntwood from 1992 to 1997. He announced in 2008 that he would not stand at the 2010 general election, citing ill-health.)	Labour
2010	Aidan Burley	Conservative
2015	Amanda Milling	Conservative
2024	Josh Newbury	Labour

== Elections ==
=== Elections in the 2020s ===
General election 2024: Cannock Chase
Party	Candidate	Votes	%	±%
Labour	Josh Newbury	15,671	36.5	+11.1
Conservative	Amanda Milling	12,546	29.2	−39.1
Reform	Paul Allen	11,570	26.9	New
Green	Andrea Muckley	2,137	5.0	−1.3
Liberal Democrats	Elizabeth Jewkes	1,029	2.4	New
Majority		3,125	7.3	
Turnout		42,953	55.8	−5.5
Labour gain from Conservative		Swing	+25.1	

=== Elections in the 2010s ===
General election 2019: Cannock Chase
Party	Candidate	Votes	%	±%
Conservative	Amanda Milling	31,636	68.3	+13.3
Labour	Anne Hobbs	11,757	25.4	−12.0
Green	Paul Woodhead	2,920	6.3	+4.6
Majority		19,879	42.9	+25.5
Turnout		46,313	61.9	−2.3
Conservative hold		Swing	+12.7	

General election 2017: Cannock Chase
Party	Candidate	Votes	%	±%
Conservative	Amanda Milling	26,318	55.0	+10.8
Labour	Paul Dadge	17,927	37.4	+3.7
UKIP	Paul Allen	2,018	4.2	−13.3
Green	Paul Woodhead	815	1.7	−0.2
Liberal Democrats	Nat Green	794	1.7	−1.0
Majority		8,391	17.4	+6.9
Turnout		47,872	64.2	+1.0
Conservative hold		Swing	+3.5	

General election 2015: Cannock Chase
Party	Candidate	Votes	%	±%
Conservative	Amanda Milling	20,811	44.2	+4.1
Labour	Janos Toth	15,888	33.7	+0.6
UKIP	Grahame Wiggin	8,224	17.5	+14.0
Liberal Democrats	Ian Jackson	1,270	2.7	−14.3
Green	Paul Woodhead	906	1.9	New
Majority		4,923	10.5	+3.5
Turnout		47,099	63.2	+2.1
Conservative hold		Swing	+1.7	

General election 2010: Cannock Chase
Party	Candidate	Votes	%	±%
Conservative	Aidan Burley	18,271	40.1	+10.1
Labour	Susan Woodward	15,076	33.1	−17.9
Liberal Democrats	Jon Hunt	7,732	17.0	+3.0
BNP	Terence Majorowicz	2,168	4.8	New
UKIP	Malcolm McKenzie	1,580	3.5	−1.6
Independent	Ron Turville	380	0.8	New
Get Snouts Out The Trough	Roy Jenkins	259	0.6	New
Independent	Mike Walters	93	0.2	New
Majority		3,195	7.0	
Turnout		45,559	61.1	+3.7
Conservative gain from Labour		Swing	+14.0	

The vote share change in 2010 comes from the notional, not actual, 2005 results because of the boundary change (loss of Huntington).

=== Elections in the 2000s ===
General election 2005: Cannock Chase
Party	Candidate	Votes	%	±%
Labour	Tony Wright	22,139	51.3	−4.8
Conservative	Ian Collard	12,912	29.9	−0.2
Liberal Democrats	Jenny Pinkett	5,934	13.8	0.0
UKIP	Roy Jenkins	2,170	5.0	New
Majority		9,227	21.4	−4.6
Turnout		43,155	57.4	+2.0
Labour hold		Swing	−2.3	

General election 2001: Cannock Chase
Party	Candidate	Votes	%	±%
Labour	Tony Wright	23,049	56.1	+1.3
Conservative	Gavin Smithers	12,345	30.1	+2.9
Liberal Democrats	Stewart Reynolds	5,670	13.8	+5.1
Majority		10,704	26.0	−1.6
Turnout		41,064	55.4	−17.0
Labour hold		Swing	−0.8	

=== Elections in the 1990s ===
General election 1997: Cannock Chase
Party	Candidate	Votes	%	±%
Labour	Tony Wright	28,705	54.8	
Conservative	John Backhouse	14,227	27.2	
Liberal Democrats	Richard Kirby	4,537	8.7	
Referendum	Peter Froggatt	1,663	3.2	
New Labour	William Hurley	1,615	3.1	
Socialist Labour	Mick Conroy	1,120	2.1	
Monster Raving Loony	Melvyn Hartshorne	499	1.0	
Majority		14,478	27.6	
Turnout		52,366	72.4	
Labour win (new seat)				

== See also ==
- List of parliamentary constituencies in Staffordshire
- List of parliamentary constituencies in West Midlands (region)
