= Cannock and Burntwood =

UK Parliament constituency (1983–1997)

- Former constituency for the House of Commons
- County: Staffordshire
- Major settlements: Cannock

1983–1997
- Seats: One
- Created from: Cannock and Lichfield and Tamworth
- Replaced by: Cannock Chase, Lichfield

Cannock and Burntwood was a parliamentary constituency in Staffordshire which returned one Member of Parliament (MP) to the House of Commons of the Parliament of the United Kingdom. The constituency name refers to the towns of Cannock and Burntwood.

== Constituency profile ==
The Cannock and Burntwood constituency was located in Staffordshire and contained parts of Cannock Chase and Lichfield districts. The constituency was based around the towns of Cannock and Burntwood. It also included the town of Hednesford and the villages of Cannock Wood, Hammerwich and Norton Canes. Like the nearby Black Country, the constituency had a history of coal mining. Cannock and Burntwood was a marginal seat throughout its existence.

== Boundaries ==
The District of Cannock Chase wards of Anglesey, Broomhill, Cannock South, Chadsmoor, Heath Hayes, Longford, Norton Canes, Parkside, Pye Green Valley, and Rawnsley, and the District of Lichfield wards of All Saints, Boney Hay, Chase Terrace, Chasetown, Hammerwich, Highfield, Redslade, and Summerfield.

== History ==
The constituency was created at the 1983 general election. Its territory was taken from two abolished constituencies: 68.3% from Cannock, and 31.97% from Lichfield and Tamworth. It disappeared at the 1997 general election, when it was split between two new seats: 68.49% of its territory went to Cannock Chase, and 31.51% to Lichfield.

== Members of Parliament ==
Election	Member	Party
1983	Gerald Howarth	Conservative
1992	Tony Wright	Labour
1997	constituency abolished: see Cannock Chase & Lichfield	

== Elections ==
=== Elections in the 1980s ===
General election 1983: Cannock and Burntwood
Party	Candidate	Votes	%	±%
Conservative	Gerald Howarth	20,976	40.9	
Labour	Gwilym Roberts	18,931	36.9	
SDP	Joseph Withnall	11,336	22.1	
Majority		2,045	4.0	
Turnout		51,243	77.4	
Conservative win (new seat)				

General election 1987: Cannock and Burntwood
Party	Candidate	Votes	%	±%
Conservative	Gerald Howarth	24,186	44.5	+3.6
Labour	Gwilym Roberts	21,497	39.5	+2.6
Liberal	Neil Stanley	8,698	16.0	−6.1
Majority		2,689	5.0	+1.0
Turnout		54,381	79.8	+2.4
Conservative hold		Swing	+0.6	

=== Elections in the 1990s ===
General election 1992: Cannock and Burntwood
Party	Candidate	Votes	%	±%
Labour	Anthony Wayland Wright	28,139	46.0	+6.5
Conservative	Gerald Howarth	26,633	43.6	−0.9
Liberal Democrats	Peter Treasaden	5,899	9.6	−6.4
Monster Raving Loony	Melvin Hartshorne	469	0.8	New
Majority		1,506	2.4	N/A
Turnout		61,140	84.3	+4.5
Labour gain from Conservative		Swing	+3.7	

== See also ==
- parliamentary constituencies in Staffordshire
