= James Cleverly =

British politician (born 1969)

Lieutenant Colonel The Right Honourable Sir James Cleverly TD VR MP
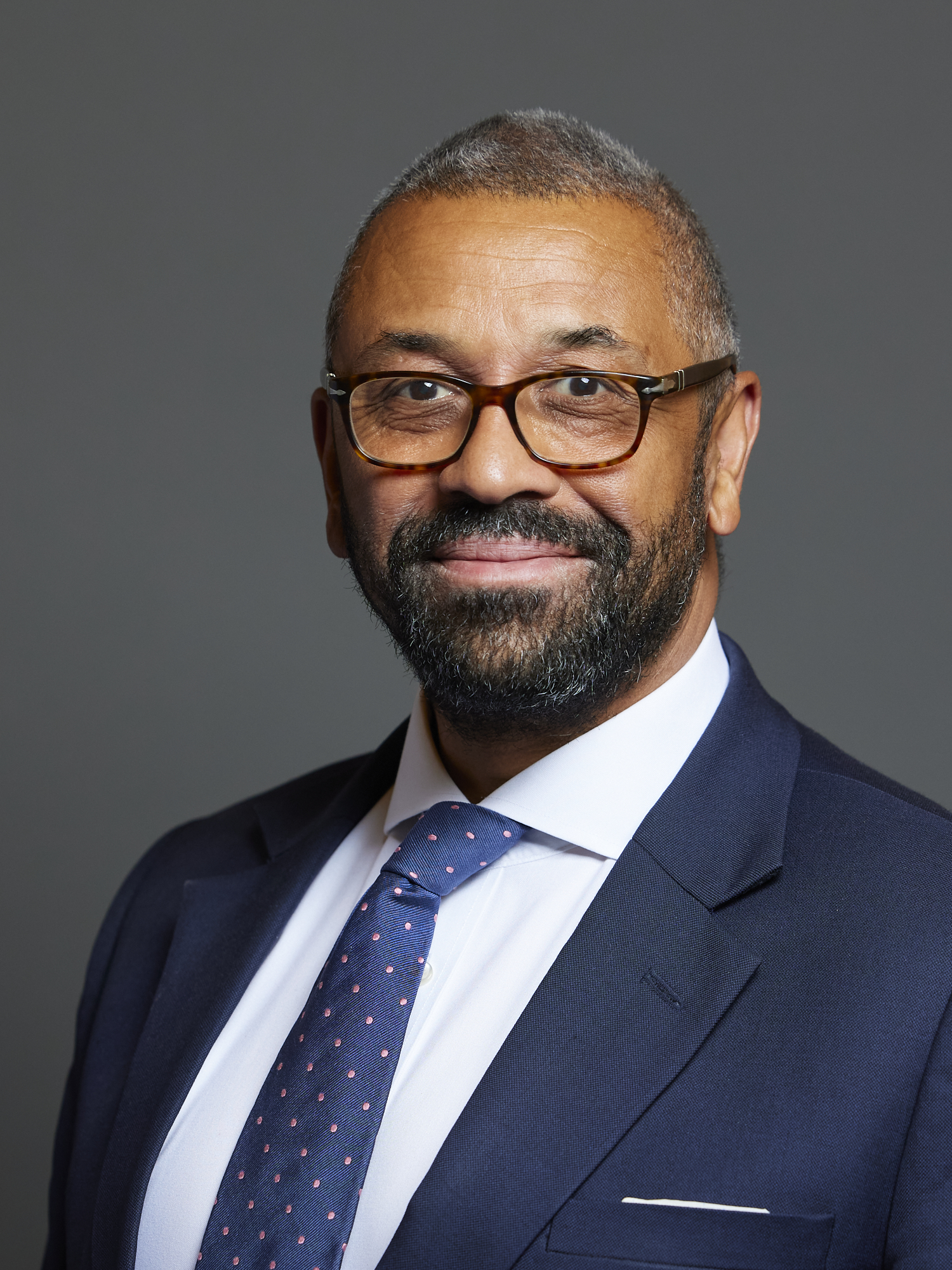
- Official portrait, 2024

Home Secretary
- In office 13 November 2023 – 5 July 2024
- Prime Minister: Rishi Sunak
- Preceded by: Suella Braverman
- Succeeded by: Yvette Cooper

Foreign Secretary
- In office 6 September 2022 – 13 November 2023
- Prime Minister: Liz Truss; Rishi Sunak
- Preceded by: Liz Truss
- Succeeded by: David Cameron

Secretary of State for Education
- In office 7 July 2022 – 6 September 2022
- Prime Minister: Boris Johnson
- Preceded by: Michelle Donelan
- Succeeded by: Kit Malthouse

Minister without Portfolio
- In office 24 July 2019 – 13 February 2020
- Prime Minister: Boris Johnson
- Preceded by: Brandon Lewis
- Succeeded by: Amanda Milling
Shadow cabinet posts
Shadow Secretary of State for Housing, Communities and Local Government
In office 22 July 2025 – 31 August 2026
Leader	Kemi Badenoch
Preceded by	Kevin Hollinrake
Succeeded by	Katie Lam
Shadow Home Secretary
In office 8 July 2024 – 5 November 2024
Leader	Rishi Sunak
Preceded by	Yvette Cooper
Succeeded by	Chris Philp
Junior ministerial offices
Minister of State for Europe and North America
In office 8 February 2022 – 7 July 2022
Prime Minister	Boris Johnson
Preceded by	Chris Heaton-Harris (Note: As Minister of State for Europe; Cleverly retained responsibility for North America)
Succeeded by	Graham Stuart (Note: As Minister of State for Europe. Rehman Chishti assumed responsibility for North America.)
Minister of State for Middle East, North Africa and North America (Note: Jointly with the Department for International Development until September 2020; Middle East and North Africa until December 2021.)
In office 13 February 2020 – 8 February 2022
Prime Minister	Boris Johnson
Preceded by	Andrew Murrison
Succeeded by	Amanda Milling (Note: As Minister of State for Asia and the Middle East. The Lord Ahmad of Wimbledon assumed responsibility for North Africa; Cleverly retained responsibility for North America.)
Parliamentary Under-Secretary of State for Exiting the European Union
In office 4 April 2019 – 24 July 2019
Prime Minister	Theresa May
Preceded by	Chris Heaton-Harris
Succeeded by	Office abolished
Party political offices
Chairman of the Conservative Party
In office 24 July 2019 – 13 February 2020 Serving with Ben Elliot
Leader	Boris Johnson
Preceded by	Sir Brandon Lewis
Succeeded by	Amanda Milling
Deputy Chairman of the Conservative Party
In office 8 January 2018 – 4 April 2019
Leader	Theresa May
Preceded by	Amanda Sater
Succeeded by	Helen Whately

Member of Parliament for Braintree
- Incumbent
- Assumed office 7 May 2015
- Preceded by: Brooks Newmark
- Majority: 3,670 (7.5%)
London Assembly offices
Leader of the Conservative Party in the London Assembly
In office March 2011 – June 2012
Preceded by	Roger Evans
Succeeded by	Andrew Boff
Member of the London Assembly for Bexley and Bromley
In office 4 May 2008 – 5 May 2016
Preceded by	Bob Neill
Succeeded by	Gareth Bacon

Personal details
- Born: James Spencer Cleverly; 4 September 1969 (age 57) Lewisham, London, England
- Party: Conservative
- Spouse: Susannah Sparks (m. 2000)
- Children: 2
- Education: Colfe's School; Ealing College of Higher Education (BA)
- Occupation: Politician; Army Reserve officer
- Website: cleverly4braintree.com

Military service
- Allegiance: United Kingdom
- Branch/service: British Army (Reserve)
- Years of service: 1989–present
- Rank: Lieutenant Colonel
- Unit: Royal Artillery
- James Cleverly's voice Cleverly outlines his foreign policy priorities as Foreign Secretary. Recorded 15 December 2022

Sir James Spencer Cleverly (born 4 September 1969) is a British politician and Army Reserve officer who served as Home Secretary from November 2023 to July 2024 and as Foreign Secretary from 2022 to 2023. A member of the Conservative Party, he has been the Member of Parliament (MP) for Braintree since 2015. He previously served as Education Secretary from July to September 2022, Chairman of the Conservative Party alongside Ben Elliot from 2019 to 2020, and in other junior ministerial positions.

Born in Lewisham, Cleverly attended Riverston School and Colfe's School. He went on to study hospitality management studies at the Ealing College of Higher Education, before he pursued a military career after he was commissioned into the Army Reserve in 1991. Cleverly was elected to the London Assembly for Bexley and Bromley in the 2008 election for the Conservative Party, and served as the party's leader in the assembly from 2011 to 2012. He was elected to the House of Commons for Braintree at the 2015 general election, and later stood down from the London Assembly at the 2016 election. He advocated a vote for Brexit in the 2016 EU membership referendum, and was reelected to parliament in the 2017 general election.

In the second May ministry, Cleverly served as Deputy Chairman of the Conservative Party from 2018 to 2019 and Parliamentary Under-Secretary of State for Exiting the European Union from April to July 2019. He was promoted to the Cabinet as minister without portfolio in the First Johnson ministry, serving as Chairman of the Conservative Party alongside Ben Elliot from 2019 to 2020. Cleverly was demoted from the Cabinet in the 2020 cabinet reshuffle; serving as Minister of State for Middle East, North Africa and North America from February 2020 to February 2022 and as Minister of State for Europe and North America from February to July 2022. During the July 2022 government crisis, Cleverly returned to Cabinet, succeeding Michelle Donelan as Secretary of State for Education.

In September 2022, he was appointed foreign secretary by Prime Minister Liz Truss, whom he had directly served under while she was Foreign Secretary. Retained as foreign secretary when Rishi Sunak became prime minister in October 2022, Cleverly was then appointed home secretary in the November 2023 cabinet reshuffle, being succeeded as foreign secretary by former prime minister David Cameron. As Home Secretary, Cleverly committed to maintaining the Rwanda asylum plan and introduced a plan to substantially reduce legal migration to the UK by raising the threshold for family visas. After Labour's victory in the 2024 general election, Cleverly was appointed Shadow Home Secretary in Sunak's shadow cabinet, and later launched his bid to become Leader of the Conservative Party but was knocked out of the contest in the final round of MP voting. He spent eight months on the backbenches after the election of Kemi Badenoch as leader, receiving a knighthood in April 2025 for political and public service, before returning to the Shadow Cabinet as Shadow Housing Secretary in a reshuffle in July 2025. In August 2026, he announced his resignation from the shadow cabinet to stand for Mayor of London. In November 2026, Cleverly was selected for the Conservative candidate for the London Mayoral elections in 2028.

== Early life and education ==
James Spencer Cleverly was born on 4 September 1969 in Lewisham Hospital in Lewisham, London, to James Philip and Evelyn Suna Cleverly. He spent part of his childhood in Chelmsford. His English father worked as a surveyor and his Sierra Leonean mother worked as a midwife. He was privately educated at Riverston School and Colfe's School in Lee. He pursued hospitality management studies at Ealing College of Higher Education (now University of West London) graduating with a Bachelor of Arts degree in 1991.

After graduation, Cleverly worked for publishing company Verenigde Nederlandse Uitgeverijen, and joined Informa as international sales manager in 2002. In 2004, he joined Crimson Publishing as an advertising manager. He became online commercial manager for Caspian Publishing in 2006. The following year, he co-founded web publishing company Point and Fire.

== Military service ==
Cleverly's initial training at Sandhurst was curtailed by a leg injury sustained in 1989. On 6 October 1991, he was commissioned into the Army Reserve, as a second lieutenant (acting). In January 1993, his commission was confirmed and he was appointed substantive second lieutenant. Cleverly was promoted to lieutenant on 6 October 1993, to captain on 26 May 1998, and to major on 1 November 2003.

Until 2005, Cleverly was Battery Commander of 266 (Para) Battery Royal Artillery (Volunteers). Cleverly was promoted to lieutenant colonel on 1 March 2015. He was serving with 100 (Yeomanry) Regiment, Royal Artillery, working as a Staff Officer in 1st (UK) Division.

== London assembly career (2008–2016) ==
In March 2007, Cleverly was selected as the Conservative Party candidate for the Bexley and Bromley constituency of the London Assembly. The London Assembly election was held on 1 May with the count and declaration on 2 May, where he received 105,162 votes (52.6% of the vote) and a majority of 75,237.

In January 2009, Cleverly was appointed as the Mayor of London's youth ambassador, a newly created role which was seen as being a replacement post for the deputy mayor for young people, a post left vacant after the resignation of Ray Lewis. The creation of the role caused some controversy as it was not filled by a mayoral appointment but by a member of the Assembly whose formal role was to scrutinise the Mayor. The decision was defended because of the precedent set by the appointment of Kit Malthouse as Deputy Mayor for Policing.

In February 2010, Cleverly was appointed as the chairman of the London Waste and Recycling Board, replacing Boris Johnson who had stood down. In August 2010, Cleverly posted a tweet saying: "We may be coalition partners but it doesn't stop me thinking Simon Hughes is a dick." This was in response to a suggestion by Hughes, the Liberal Democrat deputy leader, that backbench MPs should be able to veto Coalition policies. He later apologised.

In November 2010, Cleverly was re-selected to be the Conservative candidate for Bexley and Bromley at the 2012 London Assembly election, going on to win the seat with 88,482 votes (once again 52.6% of the votes) and a majority of 47,768. After the defeat of Brian Coleman at the election, Cleverly was appointed to the chair of the London Fire and Emergency Planning Authority.

== Parliamentary career (2015–present) ==
=== Backbenches (2015–2019) ===
In January 2015, Cleverly was selected to be the Conservative parliamentary candidate for Braintree, after the sitting Conservative MP Brooks Newmark stood down following controversy over sending sexually suggestive messages to an undercover reporter. His selection came after the initial selection process was quietly suspended by Conservative Campaign Headquarters, after the local party chose someone not on the approved candidates list and was told to "think again". At the 2015 general election, Cleverly was elected to Parliament as MP for Braintree, winning 53.8% of the vote and a majority of 17,610. Following the election, Cleverly did not defend his seat at the 2016 London Assembly election.

In November 2015, Cleverly was criticised for pushing through the closure of 10 fire stations in London after the death of an elderly man in Camden following delays in the arrival of fire crews. In response, Cleverly said: "It is impossible for them to say that with certainty. I think it would be much wiser for the FBU to wait for the details of that fire investigation to come out before they start making these opportunistic allegations."

In January 2016, the Labour Party proposed an amendment to the Housing and Planning Bill 2016, which would have required private landlords to make homes which they put up for rent fit for human habitation. According to Parliament's register of interests, Cleverly was one of 72 Conservative MPs who voted against the amendment and who personally derived an income from renting out property. The Conservative Government had responded to the amendment by saying that they believed homes should be fit for human habitation but did not want to pass the new law that would explicitly require it. In March 2016, Cleverly was asked to step down as patron of Advocacy for All, a charity supporting disadvantaged people in South East England. The charity felt he was no longer a suitable person for the role, given that he had voted to cut Employment and Support Allowance (the benefit paid to disabled people who are unable to work).

Cleverly advocated voting for Brexit in the 2016 EU membership referendum. At the 2017 general election, Cleverly was re-elected with an increased vote share of 62.8% and an increased majority of 18,422. In January 2018 he was appointed as a deputy chairman of the Conservative Party before becoming a junior minister at the Department for Exiting the European Union in April 2019. In October 2018, Cleverly defended Conservative London mayoral candidate Shaun Bailey over potentially Islamophobic and anti-Hindu comments made in a pamphlet and suggested that black boys were drifting into crime as a result of learning more about faiths other than "their own Christian culture". On 29 May 2019, Cleverly announced he was standing to replace Theresa May in the 2019 Conservative leadership election, before withdrawing from the race on 4 June 2019.

=== Frontbench career (2019–2022) ===
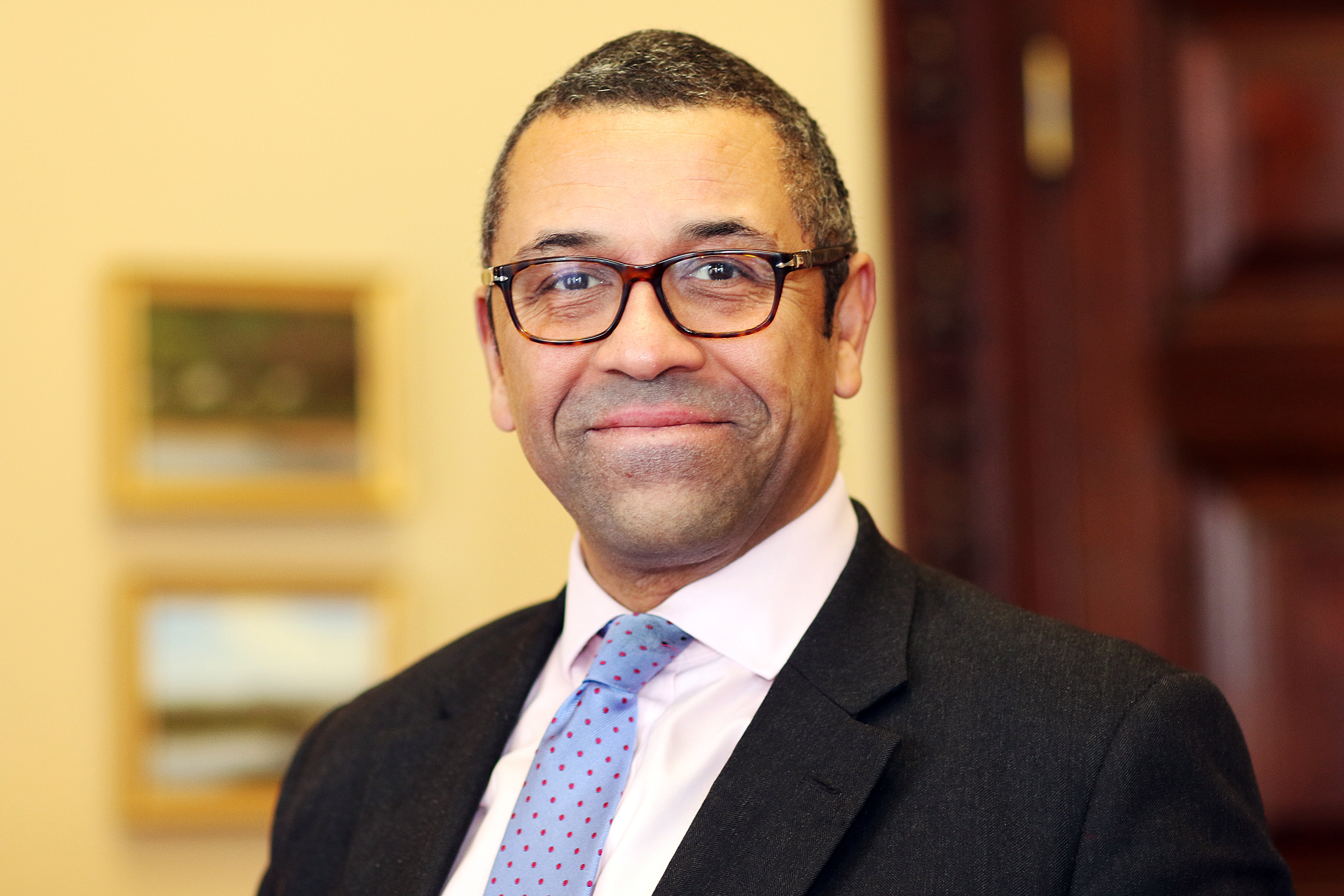
Cleverly as Minister of State for Middle East & North Africa in 2020

Following the appointment of Boris Johnson as Prime Minister, Cleverly was appointed Chairman of the Conservative Party, serving alongside Ben Elliot. At the 2019 general election, Cleverly was again re-elected with an increased vote share of 67.5% and an increased majority of 24,673.

In the 2020 cabinet reshuffle, Cleverly was removed from Johnson's cabinet and appointed Minister of State for the Middle East and North Africa. He became Minister of State for Middle East, North Africa and North America in December 2021, before being appointed Minister of State for Europe and North America in February 2022. In September 2020, he expressed concern about a "looming" famine in Yemen.

In March 2021, Cleverly described the situation in Yemen as one of the worst humanitarian crises in the world. In March 2022, he said that attempts to compare Saudi Arabia to Russia were "ridiculously distasteful", describing Saudi Arabia as an "incredibly influential country in the region" and a "significant oil and gas producer." On 7 July 2022, Cleverly succeeded Michelle Donelan as Secretary of State for Education, a post that he held for almost two months.

=== Foreign Secretary (2022–2023) ===
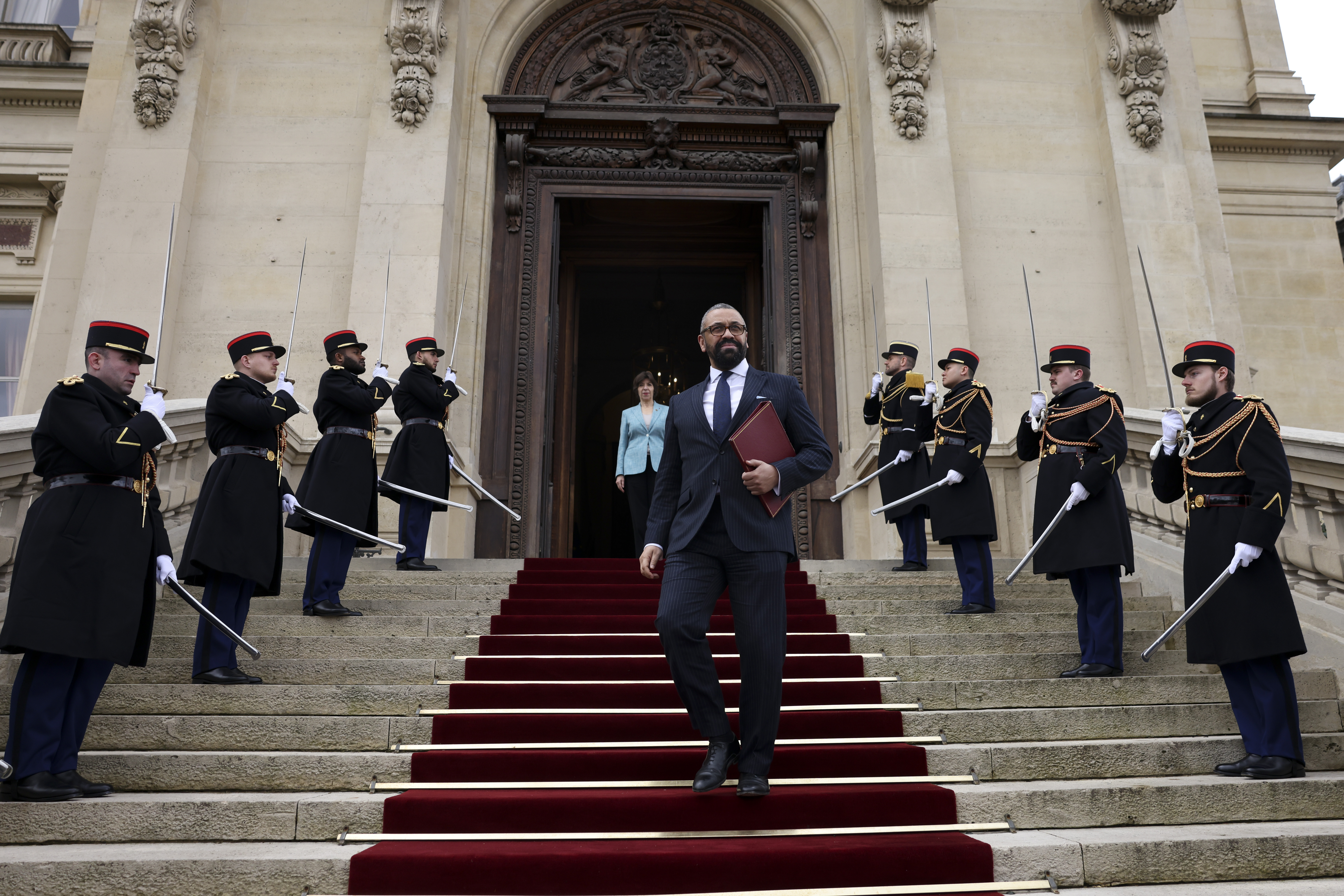
Cleverly receiving a guard of honour as Foreign Secretary at the French Ministry of Foreign Affairs in Paris, 2023

Cleverly was promoted to the position of Foreign Secretary by incoming Prime Minister Liz Truss on 6 September 2022. Cleverly attended the UN Security Council meeting on 22 September, where he called on other countries to reject the annexation referendums due to take place in Russian-occupied areas in Eastern and Southern Ukraine. On 20 October 2022, he announced that the United Kingdom would pursue sanctions against Iran for supplying drones to attack civilian targets in Ukraine. Cleverly stated that "Iran cannot be allowed to violate UN resolutions".

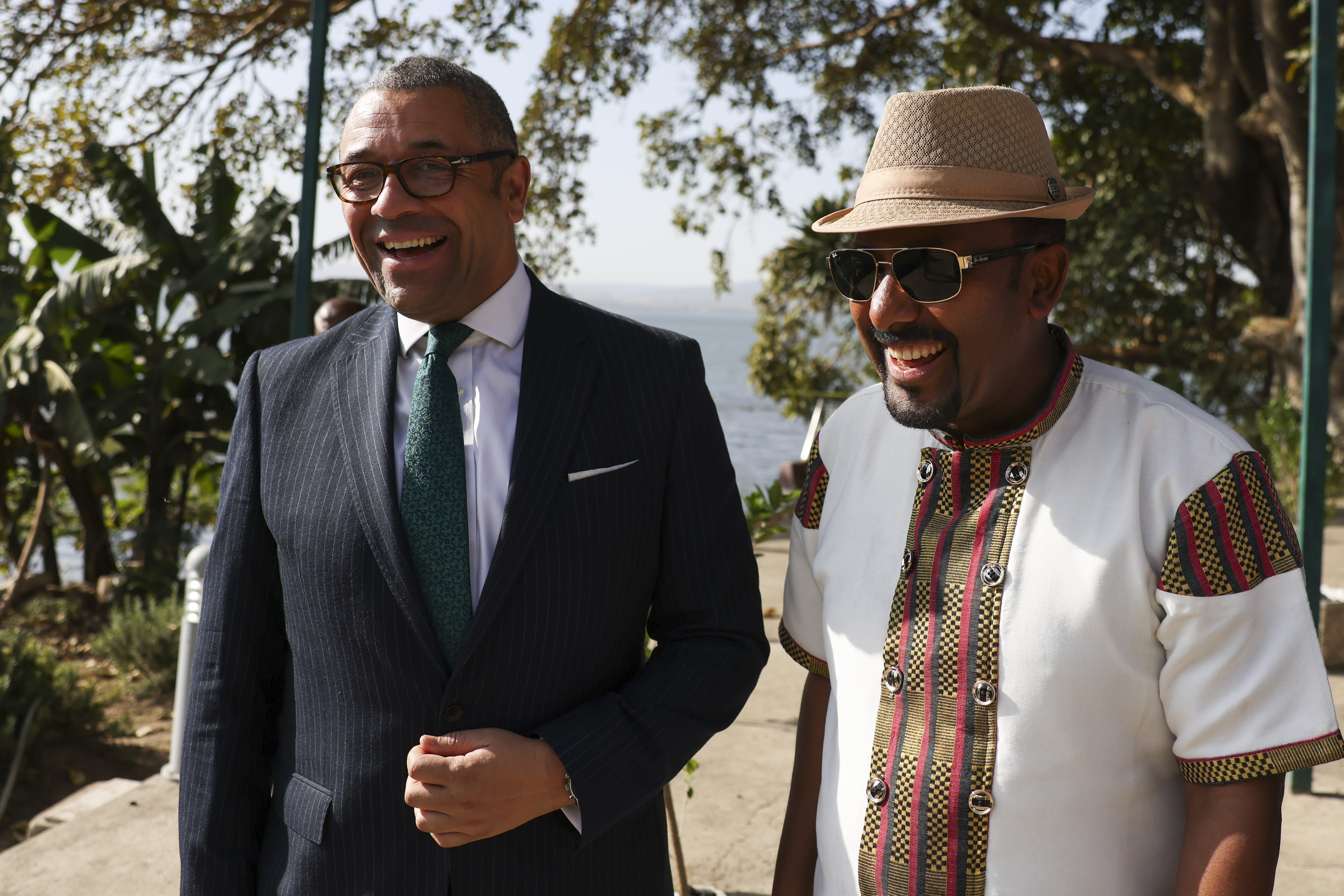
Cleverly with Ethiopia's Prime Minister Abiy Ahmed on 8 December 2022

Cleverly endorsed former Prime Minister Boris Johnson ahead of the October 2022 Conservative Party leadership election. As Johnson ended up not standing, Cleverly then endorsed Rishi Sunak. Sunak re-appointed him to his cabinet as Foreign Secretary on 25 October 2022. That same month, due to doubts raised that British homosexual football fans would be safe at the 2022 Football World Cup taking place in Qatar, Cleverly suggested that they should show "a little bit of flex and compromise", adding that he thought it was "important when you're a visitor to a country that you respect the culture of your host nation." He described Qatar as "an Islamic country with a very different set of cultural norms to our own [those of Britain]". Labour called his advice "shockingly tone-deaf", due to the fact that gay activity is illegal in Qatar and that Cleverly had known that if gay people expressed their homosexuality openly in Qatar they would be arrested. Earlier in 2022, LGBT organisations stated that "progress has been slow" in attempting to ensure the safety of LGBT football fans with FIFA in Qatar – and additionally that reassurances from Qatar had "not been adequate". In Qatar, sex between men carries a penalty of up to 7 years in prison.

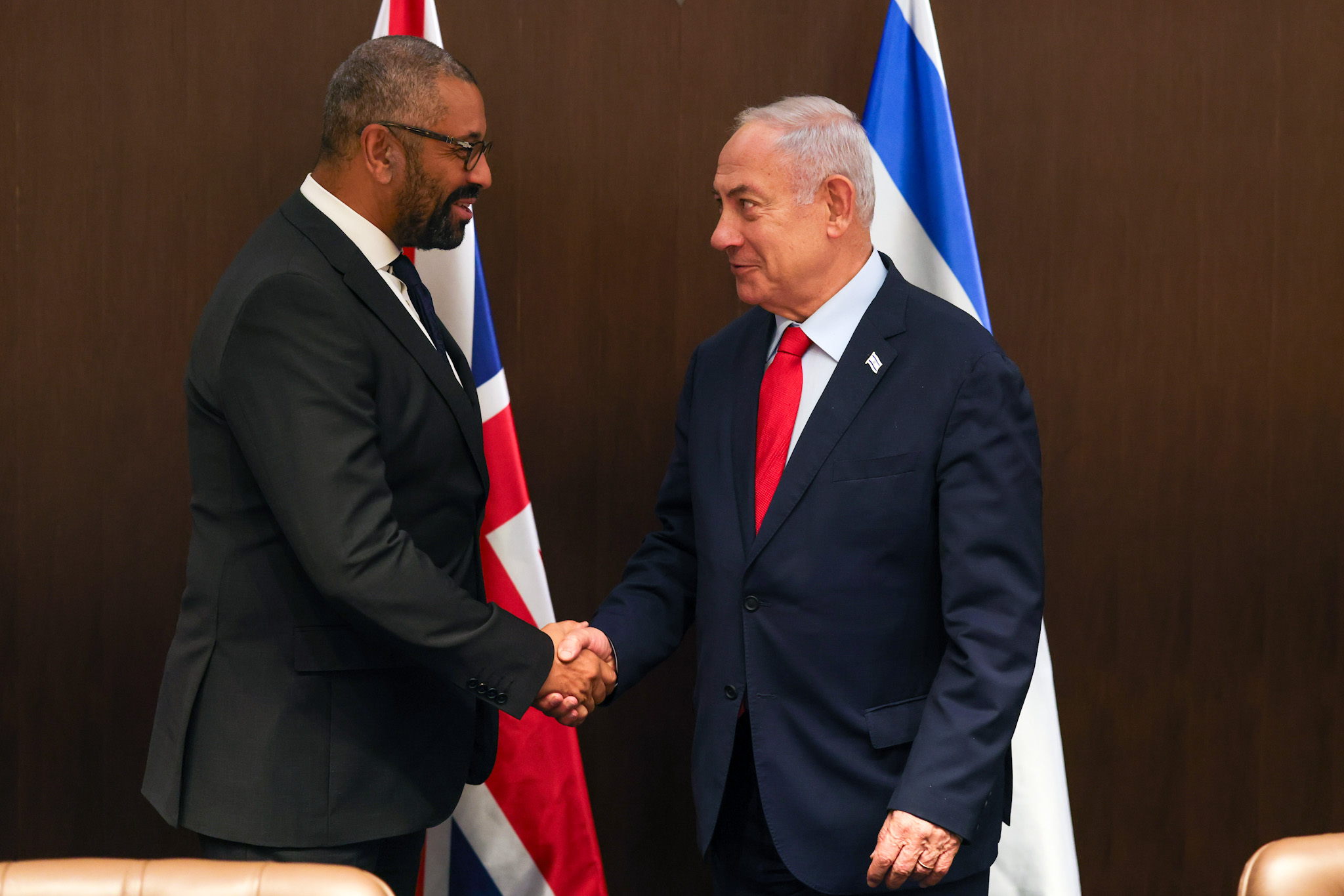
Cleverly with Israeli Prime Minister Benjamin Netanyahu in Jerusalem, 11 September 2023

In May 2022, the country's emir, Tamim bin Hamad al-Thani, said that he believed criticism about Qatar being chosen to host the World Cup came from "people who cannot accept the idea that an Arab Muslim country would host a tournament like the World Cup". Sunak's spokesperson distanced themselves from Cleverly's comments, saying that fans should not have to "compromise who they are", as well as that "Qatar's policies are not those of the UK Government and not ones we would endorse". In November 2022, Cleverly stated that his actions were "about ensuring that the English and Welsh fans going over to enjoy the football were safe and happy and that they enjoyed themselves whilst watching the tournament." In December 2022, despite human rights concerns in Saudi Arabia, Cleverly called Saudi Arabia a strategic partner. In the same month, Cleverly met his Norwegian counterpart, Anniken Huitfeldt, to discuss continued military cooperation and attended the annual Christmas tree lighting.

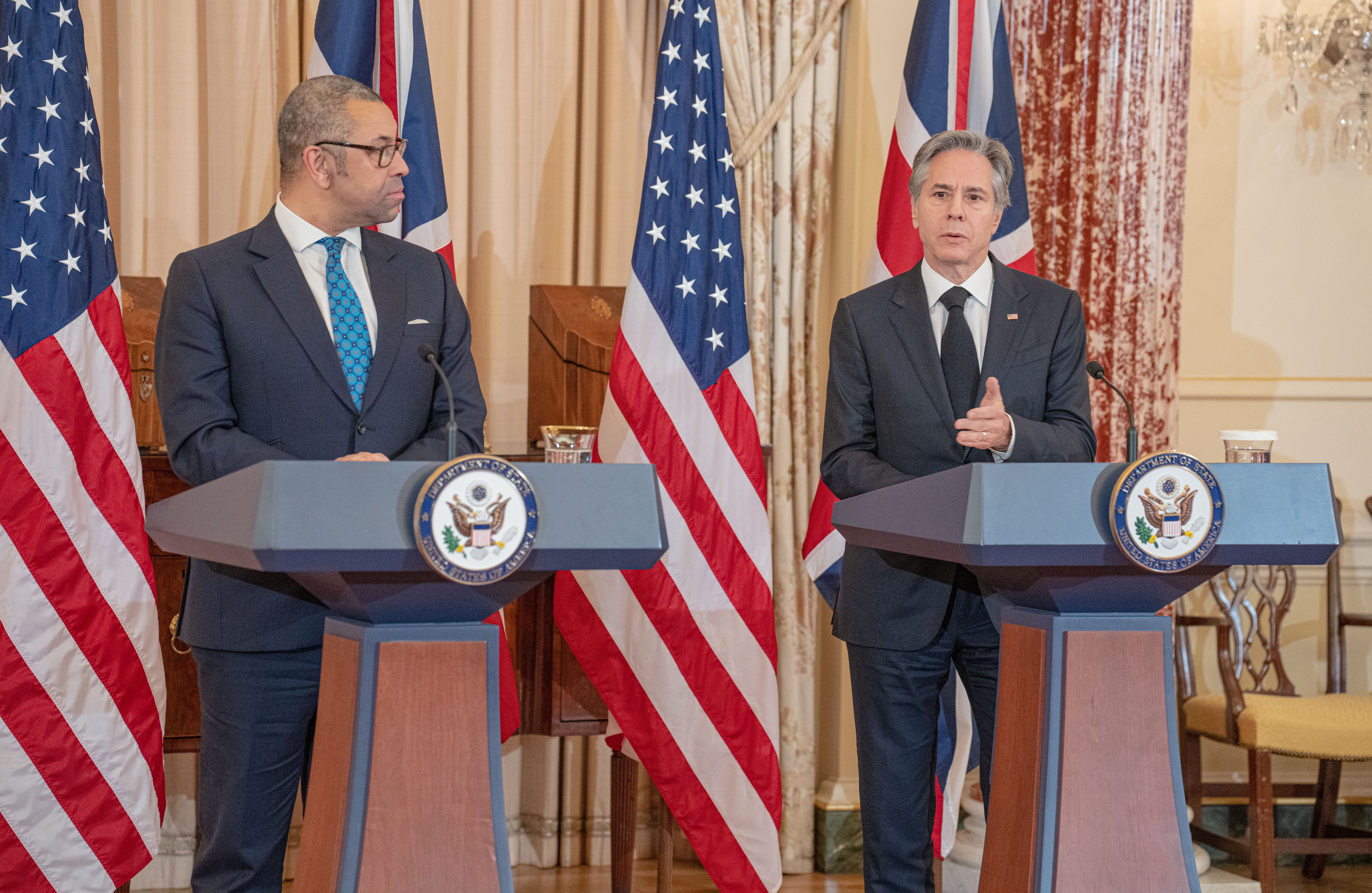
Cleverly in Washington DC with US Secretary of State Antony Blinken in 2023

In January 2023, Cleverly again met Antony Blinken, the US Secretary of State, in Washington, DC, to discuss the Russian invasion of Ukraine, recent events in Iran following the anti-regime protests occurring there among other issues, as well as to reaffirm the UK's special relationship with the United States. Cleverly was criticised by some Conservative MPs, including Liz Truss, for refusing to reclassify China as a "threat" in response to the Chinese Government's aggressive foreign policy and its human rights abuses of the Uyghur Muslim community. He called China a potential "partner for good".

On 19 July 2023, Cleverly made a public statement following his being mooted as a possible successor to the departing Defence Secretary, Ben Wallace. Cleverly asked Prime Minister Sunak to leave him in his current position, because he said he really likes the job. He stated that if he was removed from his post, "you will see nail marks on the parquet floor in my office". In August 2023, Cleverly made his first visit to China as the first UK Government minister to visit the country since 2018. The trip was reportedly to promote bilateral trade and climate change policy and challenge China's response to the Russo-Ukrainian War.

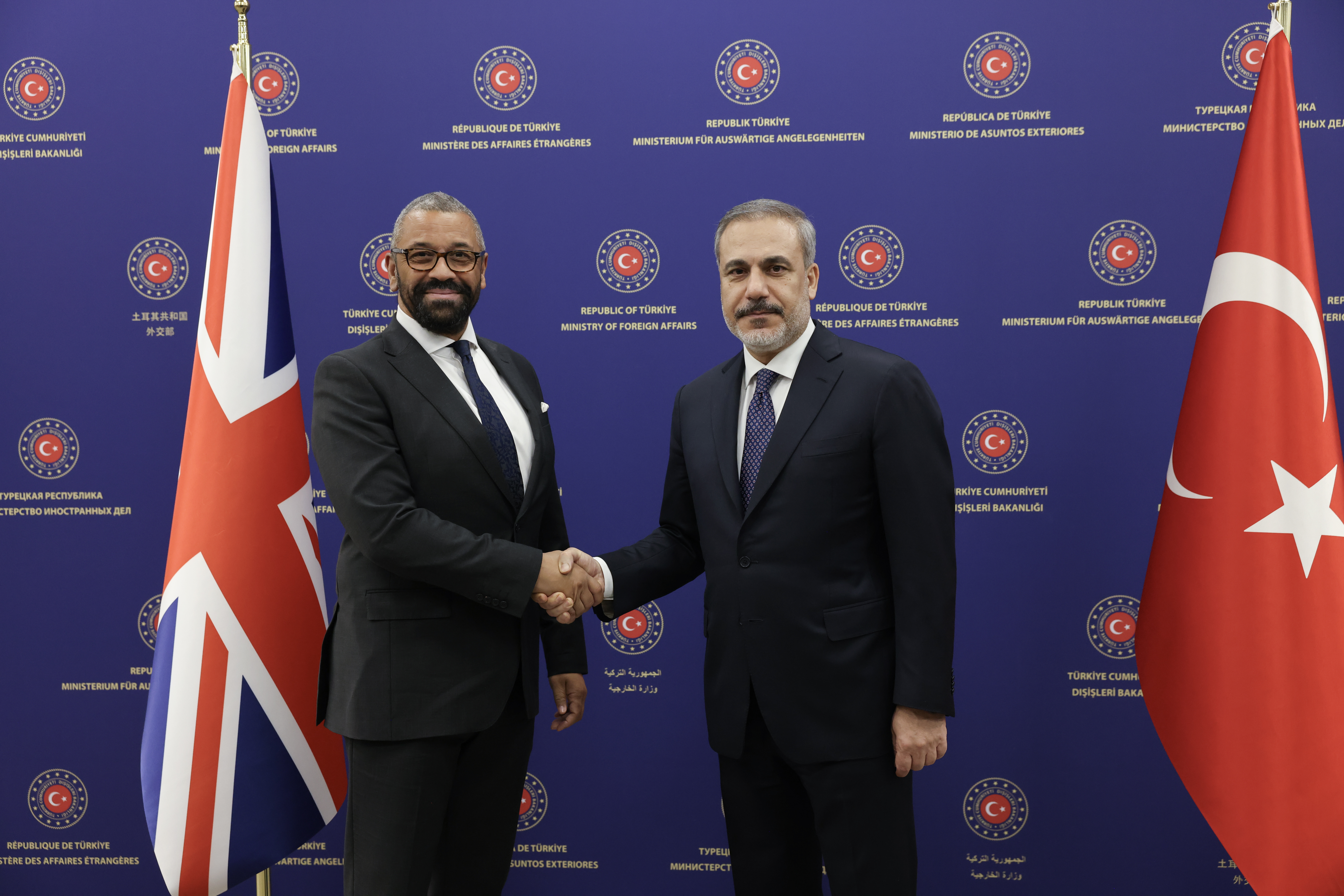
Cleverly with Turkish Foreign Minister Hakan Fidan, 13 September 2023

On 13 September 2023, he met Turkish Foreign Minister Hakan Fidan in Ankara and stated that Turkey is an "indispensable partner" to the UK and "has truly significant commitments to NATO." Cleverly expressed support for Israel during the Gaza war. On 11 October 2023, he visited Israel "to show solidarity to Israeli people". He rejected calls for a ceasefire but supported "humanitarian pauses" to provide aid to civilians in the Gaza Strip.

=== Home Secretary (2023–2024) ===
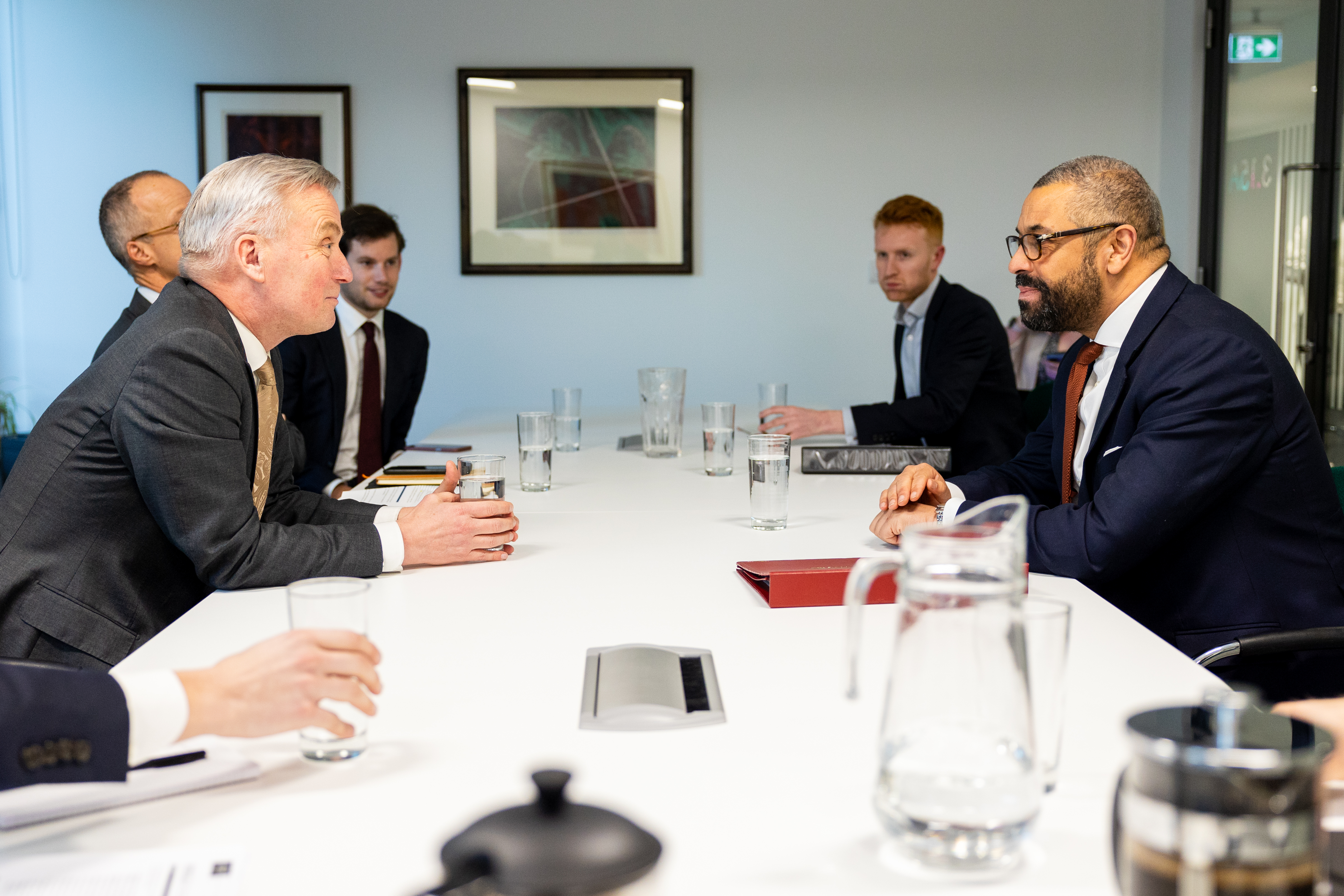
Cleverly with Dutch Minister for Migration Eric van der Burg in March 2024

In Sunak's cabinet reshuffle on 13 November 2023, Cleverly was appointed Home Secretary, succeeding Suella Braverman. On 22 November 2023, Cleverly was accused by Labour MP Alex Cunningham of calling Cunningham's Stockton North constituency a "shithole" in response to a question in the House of Commons; Cleverly denied the allegation, but apologised for using "unparliamentary language", which he said had instead been used to describe Cunningham himself.

On 23 December 2023, Cleverly faced calls to resign for joking about spiking his wife's drink with Rohypnol, a date rape drug to ensure that she would "never realise there are better men out there”. A spokesperson said that Cleverly "apologise[d]" for what he had intended "to be an ironic joke".

=== In opposition (2024–present) ===
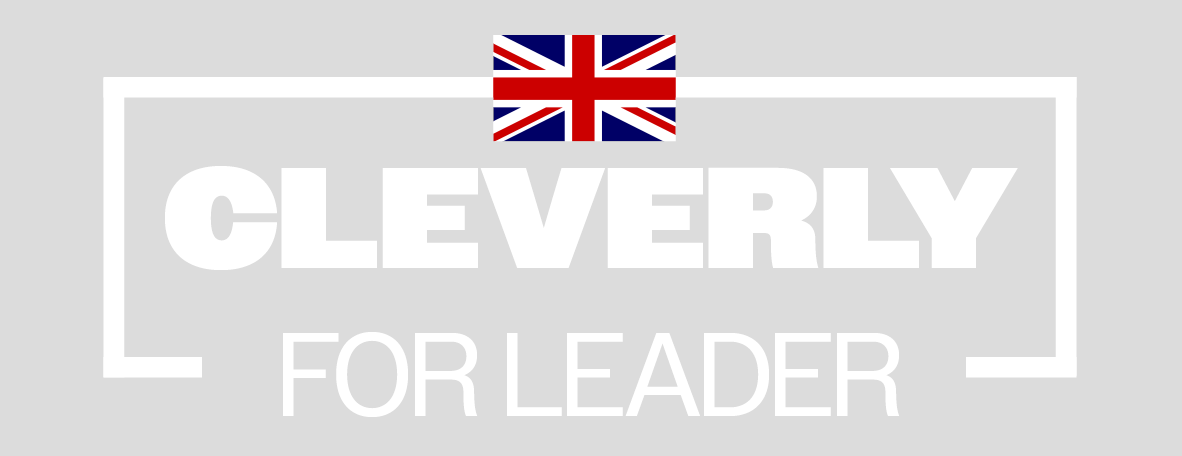
Logo used for Cleverly's 2024 leadership bid

At the 2024 general election, Cleverly was again re-elected, with a decreased vote share of 35.5% and a decreased majority of 3,670. Following the Conservative Party's defeat at the general election and the subsequent formation of the Starmer ministry, Cleverly was appointed Shadow Home Secretary in Sunak's caretaker Shadow Cabinet.

On 23 July 2024, he announced he was standing in the leadership election to be the new Conservative Party leader. As part of his campaign he pledged to reform the party including Conservative Campaign Headquarters. In the first round of voting, Cleverly came third with 22 votes, but fell down to 21 votes in the second round, coming joint third with Tom Tugendhat. On the third round, however, Cleverly jumped to first place with 39 votes, after a strong performance at the 2024 Party Conference where he argued that the Conservative Party should become "more normal". However, Cleverly was eliminated in the final round of MP voting with 37 votes. This was widely considered a shock result after his strong performance in the third round. The Independent has alleged that Robert Jenrick's campaign launched a whipping operation in order to poach Cleverly's supporters, convincing those who disliked Kemi Badenoch to support Jenrick in order to keep her out of the final round. This loss of votes led Cleverly to be knocked out, allowing Badenoch and Jenrick to go to the Member's vote which Kemi Badenoch won, leading her to become the Leader of the Conservative Party. The day before the result was announced, Cleverly revealed that he would not take a frontbench role in either Badenoch or Jenrick's Shadow Cabinet, instead choosing to return to the backbenches.

In April 2025, Cleverly refused to rule out standing for party leader again, and urged his party to stop "obsessing" over Reform UK. Later in June, Cleverly criticised Badenoch's plans to ditch net zero targets, stating that achieving climate goals and simultaneous economic growth was possible. His opinion differed from the official Conservative Party position. Cleverly voted against the assisted dying bill in June 2025, citing the number of medical organisations that were neutral on the principle of assisted dying itself while simultaneously being opposed to specific measures in the bill.

In July 2025, Cleverly was appointed Shadow Housing Secretary in the shadow cabinet reshuffle by Kemi Badenoch. On 29 August 2026, he announced his resignation to stand for London mayor, and he was duly selected as the Conservative Party candidate for the election expected in May 2028. During the candidate selection process, Cleverly announced that he would not be seeking re-election as an MP at the next UK General Election.

== In popular culture ==
Cleverly was portrayed by Christopher Colquhoun in the 2025 BBC One mini-series Prisoner 951, which recounted the imprisonment and eventual release of Nazanin Zaghari-Ratcliffe.

== Personal life ==
Cleverly married Susannah Sparks in 2000, after meeting her at the University of West London nine years earlier. Susannah was diagnosed with triple positive breast cancer in December 2021, and following a single mastectomy, chemotherapy, radiotherapy and immunotherapy she finished treatment in April 2023. The couple have two sons and live in Blackheath, south-east London.

Cleverly identifies as an atheist and a humanist, remarking during the Terminally Ill Adults (End of Life) Bill debate that "I do not come at this from a religious point of view – I am an atheist; I am a humanist." His cousin Chris Cleverly is a lawyer and businessman. He has been a fan of the miniature wargame Warhammer 40,000; in 2022 he had a private YouTube channel dedicated to painting the game's miniatures.

== Honours and decorations ==
Cleverly was awarded the Efficiency Decoration (TD) for 12 years' commissioned service in the Territorial Army in January 2012, as well as the Queen Elizabeth II Golden Jubilee Medal in 2002, the Queen Elizabeth II Diamond Jubilee Medal in 2012, the Queen Elizabeth II Platinum Jubilee Medal in 2022 and the King Charles III Coronation Medal in 2023. He was sworn of the Privy Council of the United Kingdom on 8 October 2019 at Buckingham Palace as part of his appointment as Minister without portfolio and Conservative Party Chairman in the Johnson ministry. Membership of the Privy Council affords the honorary prefix "the Right Honourable" for life. In April 2025, Cleverly was knighted in Rishi Sunak's 2024 Prime Minister's Resignation Honours by King Charles III "for political and public service".

He was appointed Honorary Colonel of the 100 Regiment Royal Artillery Army Reserve, his old regiment, on 15 July 2025.

Undress ribbons worn by Cleverly:

Ribbon	Description	Notes
Knight Bachelor ribbon	Knight Bachelor	2025
	Queen Elizabeth II Golden Jubilee Medal	2002; UK version of this medal
	Queen Elizabeth II Diamond Jubilee Medal	2012; UK version of this medal
	Queen Elizabeth II Platinum Jubilee Medal	2022; UK version of this medal
	King Charles III Coronation Medal	2023; UK version of this medal
	Efficiency Decoration (TD)	2012; 12 Years Commissioned Service in the Territorial Army
	Volunteer Reserves Service Medal (VR)	10 years Commissioned Service in the Territorial Army/Army Reserves

== Notes ==
Civic offices
Preceded by Brian Coleman	Chairman of the London Fire and Emergency Planning Authority; 2012–2016	Succeeded by Fiona Twycross
Parliament of the United Kingdom
Preceded by Brooks Newmark	Member of Parliament for Braintree; 2015–present	Incumbent
Political offices
Preceded by Chris Heaton-Harris	Parliamentary Under-Secretary of State for Exiting the European Union; 2019	Position abolished
Preceded by Brandon Lewis	Minister without portfolio 2019–2020	Succeeded by Amanda Milling
Preceded by Andrew Murrison	Minister of State for the Middle East and North Africa; 2020–2021	Succeeded by Himself as Minister of State for the Middle East, North Africa and North America
Preceded by Himself as Minister of State for the Middle East and North Africa	Minister of State for Middle East, North Africa and North America; 2021–2022	Succeeded by Amanda Milling as Minister of State for Asia and the Middle East; The Lord Ahmad of Wimbledon as Minister of State for South and Central Asia, North Africa, United Nations and the Commonwealth
Preceded by Chris Heaton-Harris as Minister of State for Europe	Minister of State for Europe and North America; 2022	Succeeded by Graham Stuart as Minister of State for Europe
Preceded by Michelle Donelan	Secretary of State for Education; 2022	Succeeded by Kit Malthouse
Preceded by Liz Truss	Foreign Secretary; 2022–2023	Succeeded by David Cameron
Preceded by Suella Braverman	Home Secretary; 2023–2024	Succeeded by Yvette Cooper
Preceded by Yvette Cooper	Shadow Home Secretary; 2024	Succeeded by Chris Philp
Preceded by Kevin Hollinrake	Shadow Secretary of State for Housing, Communities and Local Government; 2025–present	Incumbent
Party political offices
Preceded by Amanda Sater	Deputy Chairman of the Conservative Party; 2018–2019	Succeeded by Helen Whately
Preceded by Brandon Lewis	Chairman of the Conservative Party; 2019–2020; Served alongside: Ben Elliot	Succeeded by Amanda Milling; Ben Elliot
