= Josh Newbury =

British politician

Josh Newbury MP
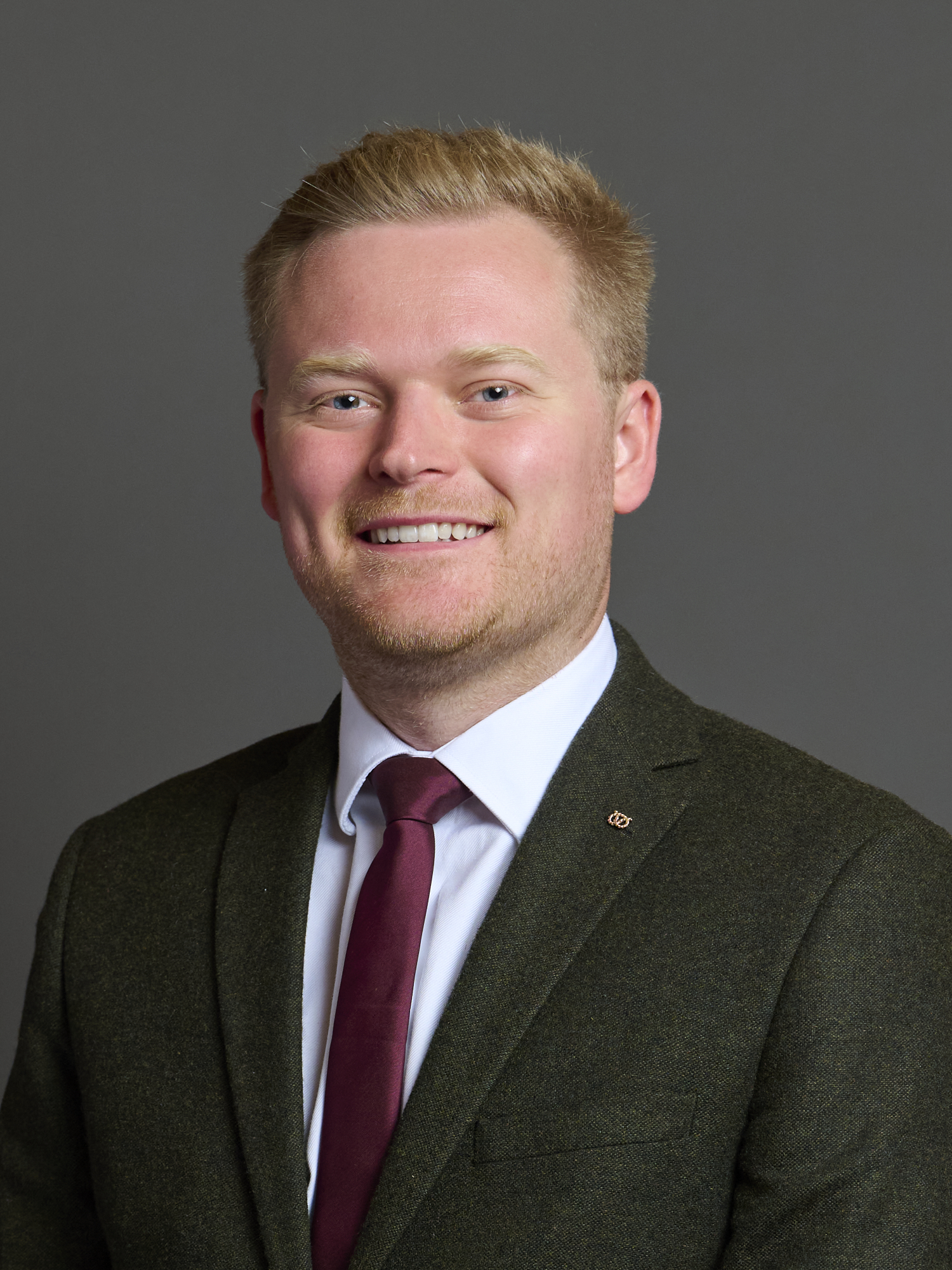
- Official portrait, 2024

Member of Parliament for Cannock Chase
- Incumbent
- Assumed office 4 July 2024
- Preceded by: Amanda Milling
- Majority: 3,215 (7.5%)

Personal details
- Party: Labour

Joshua Alan Austin Newbury is a British Labour Party politician who has served as Member of Parliament (MP) for Cannock Chase since 2024.

== Career ==
Newbury was previously a primary care communications manager at NHS Birmingham and Solihull. His other previous roles included being the communications and engagement lead at Coventry and Warwickshire Partnership NHS Trust, a stakeholder engagement manager at Health Education England and a Senior Parliamentary officer at the Energy and Utilities alliance.

Newbury was elected Councillor for the Norton Canes Ward on Cannock Chase District Council in 2019, being re-elected in 2023. He was also the deputy leader of the council until his resignation from the post after his election to Parliament in July 2024. He stood down from the council in March 2025.

Newbury was selected as the Labour Party candidate for Cannock Chase for the 2024 general election, with Labour Leader Keir Starmer visiting the constituency to promote Newbury's campaign on 2 July 2024 shortly before the election. Newbury defeated incumbent Conservative MP Amanda Milling in the election and won 15,671 votes in the election, with a majority of 3,215.

== Personal life ==
He has described himself as a "proud gay man". He and his husband have a daughter. On International Men's Day in 2025 he revealed in the House of Commons that he was raped by another man nearly a decade ago. He shared the story to end the stigma around being a victim of sexual assault.

== See also ==
- List of MPs elected in the 2024 United Kingdom general election

Parliament of the United Kingdom
Preceded by Amanda Milling	Member of Parliament for Cannock Chase; 2024–present	Incumbent
