= Tony Wright (Cannock Chase MP) =

British politician, born 1948

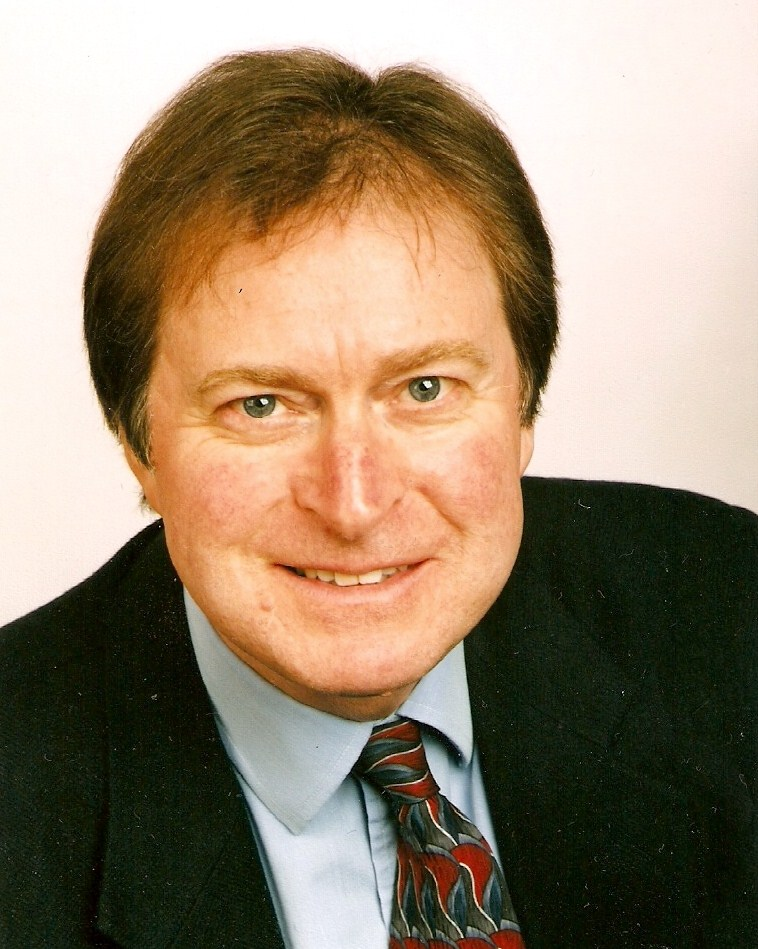
- Wright in 2007

Member of Parliament for Cannock Chase Cannock and Burntwood (1992–1997)
- In office 9 April 1992 – 12 April 2010
- Preceded by: Gerald Howarth
- Succeeded by: Aidan Burley

Personal details
- Born: 11 March 1948 (age 78) Leicester, England
- Party: Labour
- Spouse: Moira Wright
- Children: 3 sons, including Ben
- Education: London School of Economics; Balliol College, Oxford; Harvard University

Anthony Wayland Wright (born 11 March 1948) is a British Labour Party politician and author, who was the Member of Parliament (MP) for Cannock Chase from 1997 to 2010. He was first elected in 1992 for Cannock and Burntwood.

== Early life ==
Wright was educated at Desborough County Primary School, then Kettering Grammar School (now known as the Tresham Institute although the old building has been recently knocked down) on Windmill Avenue in Kettering. Wright was educated at the London School of Economics (gaining a First class honours BSc in government in 1970), Harvard University (where he was a Kennedy Scholar from 1970 to 1971), and Balliol College, Oxford, gaining a DPhil in 1973.

He was a lecturer in politics at the University College of North Wales, Bangor from 1973 to 1975. He was a lecturer in politics from 1975 to 1992 at the University of Birmingham (School of Continuing Studies), where he is now an honorary professor.

== Parliamentary career ==
He contested the Kidderminster seat in 1979. He has a keen interest in constitutional affairs, and from 1999 to 2010 was chairman of the Public Administration Select Committee. He also chaired the Reform of the House of Commons Committee ("the Wright Committee") from 2008 to 2009. He has written or edited 21 books.

On 21 July 2008 Wright announced that, for health reasons, he would not stand again at the 2010 general election.

== Return to academia ==
On 10 May 2010, University College London announced that Wright had been appointed Professor of Government and Public Policy. He joined the Department of Politics at Birkbeck College as a professorial fellow on 1 September 2010.

== Personal life ==
He married Moira Phillips in 1973 in Oxford, and they have three sons, one of whom is BBC political correspondent Ben Wright. He has had leukaemia.

== Works ==
- Restating the State? (Blackwell, 2004) ISBN 1-4051-2454-7
- British Politics: A Very Short Introduction (Oxford Paperbacks, 2002) ISBN 0-19-285459-3
- The British Political Process: An Introduction edited by Tony Wright (Routledge, 1999) ISBN 0-415-04965-2
- The New Social Democracy edited by Tony Wright and Andrew Gamble (Blackwell, 1999) ISBN 0-631-21765-7
- The People's Party: the History of the Labour Party with Matt Carter (Thames and Hudson, 1997) ISBN 0-500-01768-9
- Why Vote Labour? (Penguin, 1997) ISBN 0-14-026397-7
- Who Wins Dares: New Labour – New Politics (Fabian Society, 1997) ISBN 0-7163-0579-8
- Socialisms: Old and New (Routledge, 1996) ISBN 0-415-15179-1
- Power to the Back Benches? Restoring the Balance Between Government and Parliament by Stuart Weir, Tony Wright (Charter 88, 1996) ISBN 1-873311-36-2
- Values, Visions and Voices edited with Gordon Brown (Mainstream, 1995) ISBN 1-85158-731-4
- Beyond the Patronage State (Fabian Society, 1995) ISBN 0-7163-0569-0
- Contemporary Political Ideologies edited by Roger Eatwell, Anthony Wright (Pinter, 1993) ISBN 0-86187-096-4
- Citizens and Subjects (Routledge, 1993) ISBN 0-415-04964-4
- Political Thought Since 1945: Philosophy, Science, Ideology edited by Leonard Tivey, Anthony Wright (Edward Elgar, 1992) ISBN 1-85278-311-7
- Consuming Public Services by Nicholas Deakin, Anthony Wright (Routledge, 1990) ISBN 0-415-03208-3
- Matters of Death and Life: a Study of Bereavement Support in NHS Hospitals in England (King's Fund, 1988) ISBN 1-870551-84-2
- R.H. Tawney (Manchester University, 1987) ISBN 0-7190-1998-2
- Socialisms: Theories and Practices (Oxford University Press, 1986) ISBN 0-19-219188-8
- Socialism and Decentralisation (Fabian Society, 1984) ISBN 0-7163-0496-1
- Worlds of Labour: Essays in Birmingham Labour History edited by Anthony Wright, Richard Shackleton (University of Birmingham, 1983) ISBN 0-7044-0673-X
- G.D.H.Cole and Socialist Democracy (Oxford University, 1979) ISBN 0-19-827421-1

Parliament of the United Kingdom
Preceded by Gerald Howarth	Member of Parliament for Cannock and Burntwood; 1992–1997	Constituency abolished
New constituency	Member of Parliament for Cannock Chase; 1997–2010	Succeeded by Aidan Burley
Preceded by Rhodri Morgan	Chairman of the Public Administration Select Committee; 1999–2010	Succeeded by Bernard Jenkin
Party political offices
Preceded by Margaret Hodge	Chair of the Fabian Society; 1999–2000	Succeeded by Calum MacDonald
