= Aidan Burley =

British politician

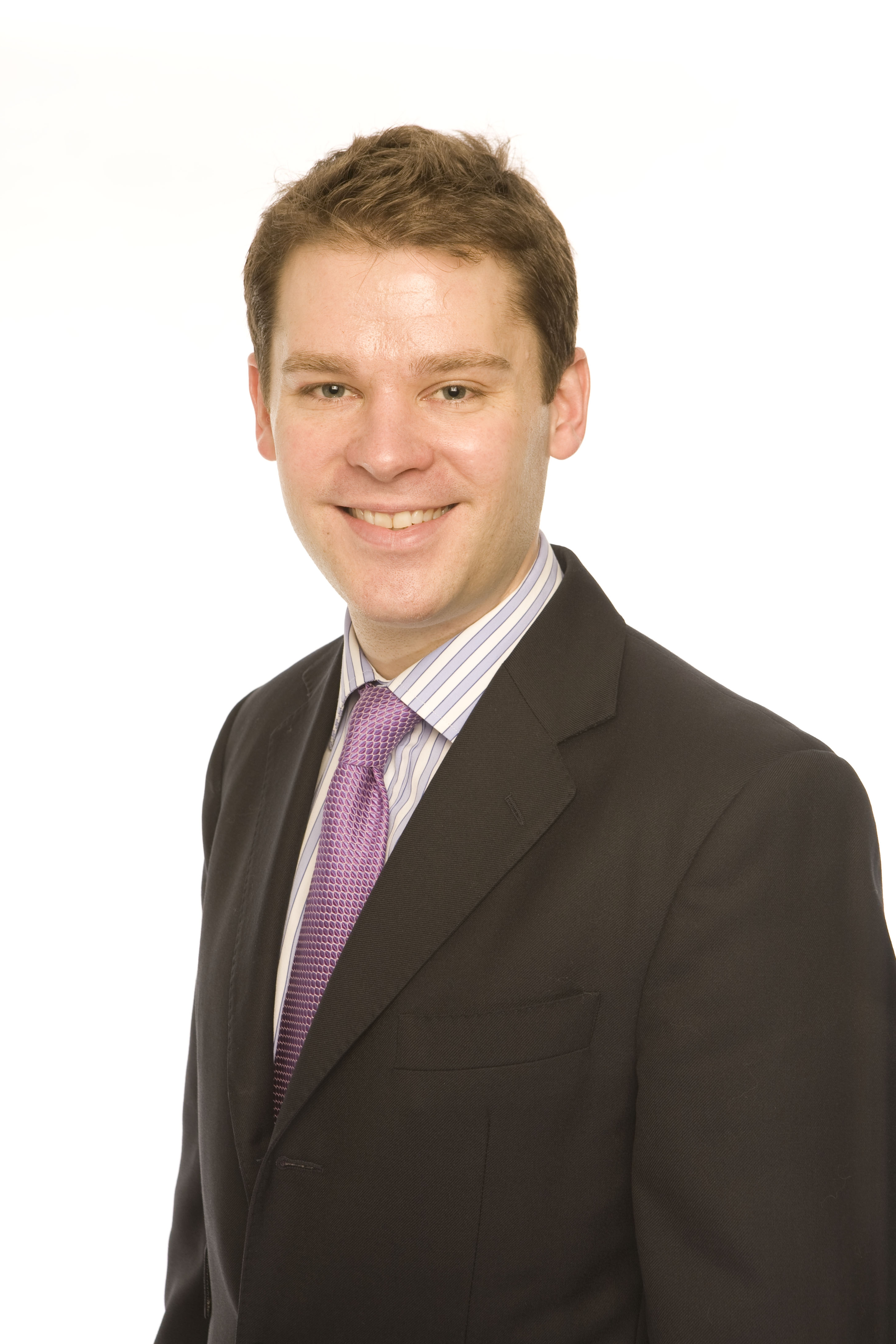
- Burley in 2010

Member of Parliament for Cannock Chase
- In office 6 May 2010 – 30 March 2015
- Preceded by: Tony Wright
- Succeeded by: Amanda Milling

Personal details
- Born: 22 January 1979 (age 47) Auckland, New Zealand
- Party: Reform UK
- Other political affiliations: Conservative (until 2024)
- Education: St John's College, Oxford
- Occupation: Businessman; entrepreneur; politician

Aidan Burley (born 22 January 1979) is a British businessman, entrepreneur and former politician. He was Conservative Member of Parliament for Cannock Chase between 2010 and 2015.

== Early life ==
Burley was born in Auckland, New Zealand and migrated with his parents to the United Kingdom a few months later.

He was educated at West House School, a private school in Birmingham, King Edward's School, Birmingham, where he stood and won as a Conservative in 1997 in the school's mock election and St John's College, Oxford University.

== Career ==
Burley was a management consultant for Accenture and later Hedra/Mouchel, working on contracts with the Home Office and the National Health Service.

During this period, he also worked for Conservative MPs Philip Hammond and Nick Herbert when they were shadow ministers, and he was elected a Conservative councillor in 2006 for the Fulham Broadway ward of Hammersmith and Fulham London Borough Council.

=== Parliamentary career ===
Burley was elected to the House of Commons as Member of Parliament for Cannock Chase in the 2010 general election with a majority of 3,195 achieving the largest swing of the election from Labour to the Conservatives, 14.01%.

Burley was a member of the Home Affairs Select Committee from 2010 to 2011. Between 12 January 2011 and 17 December 2011 he was Parliamentary Private Secretary (PPS) to the Secretary of State for Transport: firstly Philip Hammond, and later Justine Greening. He is a supporter of the Free Enterprise Group.

Burley was named by ConservativeHome as one of a minority of loyal Conservative backbench MPs not to have voted against the government in any significant rebellions.

In 2014, Burley, along with six other Conservative Party MPs, voted against the Equal Pay (Transparency) Bill, which would require all companies with more than 250 employees to declare the gap in pay between the average male and average female salaries.

==== Controversies ====
In December 2011, Burley organised and attended a stag party in Val Thorens, France, where he was best man and arranged for the groom to wear a fancy dress Nazi uniform. The groom was later prosecuted by the French police. Following this event, he expressed regret over the incident. Subsequently, Prime Minister David Cameron removed him from his parliamentary role due to additional allegations. An internal review by the Conservative Party concluded that, although Burley's actions were offensive, they did not demonstrate racism or anti-Semitism. But in February 2014, Burley announced he would not seek reelection in 2015.

During the 2012 London Olympics opening ceremony, Burley criticized the event on Twitter for being overly left-leaning, by saying it was "multicultural crap" later clarifying his comments were about its presentation. His remarks were criticized, including by fellow Conservative MP Gavin Barwell, who disapproved of his views. Burley also expressed concerns about the ceremony's overtly political content, writing "Bring back Shakespeare, Red Arrows and the Stones" on Twitter.

==== Political funding ====
It was reported in 2014 that the Cannock Chase Conservative Association had received £28,927 since 2010, and that Burley had received corporate donations from Japan Tobacco International and JCB Research; he had also received a donation from Conservative Friends of Israel. He also received £3,600 in remunerations from Clever Together LLP for work he did in 2012.

=== Business ===
Burley co-founded online e-commerce subscription business Friction Free Shaving, known as the woman's analogue to Dollar Shave Club, which he set up in 2015 after leaving Parliament. As CEO Burley initiated and led funding rounds with £1.25m being invested from Northern & Shell. Burley exited the business via a management buy out in 2023.

In 2021 Burley joined WorldPR, a global Public Relations consultancy, where he worked as Chief of Staff to the chairman.

Parliament of the United Kingdom
Preceded by Tony Wright	Member of Parliament for Cannock Chase; 2010–2015	Succeeded by Amanda Milling
