= Parliamentary Under-Secretary of State for the Americas, Multilateral and Human Rights =

UK ministerial position

United Kingdom Parliamentary Under-Secretary of State for the Americas, Multilateral and Human Rights
- Royal Arms of His Majesty's Government

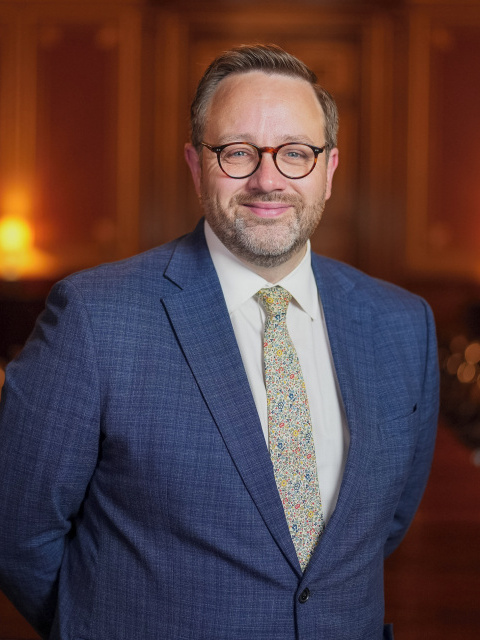
- Incumbent; Chris Elmore since 7 September 2025
- Foreign, Commonwealth and Development Office
- Style: Minister
- Nominator: Prime Minister of the United Kingdom
- Appointer: The Monarch; on advice of the Prime Minister
- Term length: At His Majesty's pleasure
- Website: Official website

The Parliamentary Under-Secretary of State for the Americas, Multilateral and Human Rights is a ministerial office in the Foreign, Commonwealth and Development Office of the British government.

The office of Minister of State for Middle East and North Africa was held by James Cleverly MP from 13 February 2020 to 8 February 2022. In December 2021, the post adopted responsibility for North America and became the deputy to the Foreign Secretary.

The Middle East portfolio was merged into the Minister of State for Asia and the Middle East in February 2022, with Cleverly moving to the position of Minister of State for Europe and North America. The position of Minister of State for Europe and North America was split in July 2022, with Graham Stuart becoming Minister of State for Europe and Rehman Chishti assuming responsibility for North America as Parliamentary Under-Secretary of State for North America, Sanctions and Consular Policy.

== Responsibilities ==
The minister is responsible for the following:

- Latin America
- US and Canada
- UN, multilateral and human rights
- Commonwealth
- protocol
- British Council and World Service

== List ==
Name	Portrait	Term of office		Political party	P.M.	F.Sec.
Minister of State for Middle East and North Africa
Alistair Burt		13 May 2010	7 October 2013	Conservative	Cameron	Hague
Hugh Robertson		7 October 2013	14 July 2014	Conservative	Cameron	Hague
Tobias Ellwood		15 July 2014	13 June 2017	Conservative	Cameron	Hammond
Tobias Ellwood		15 July 2014	13 June 2017	Conservative	May	Johnson
Alistair Burt		13 June 2017	25 March 2019	Conservative	May	Johnson
Alistair Burt		13 June 2017	25 March 2019	Conservative	May	Hunt
Minister of State for International Development and the Middle East
Andrew Murrison		9 May 2019	13 February 2020	Conservative	Johnson	Raab
Minister of State for Middle East, North Africa and North America
James Cleverly		13 February 2020	8 February 2022	Conservative	Johnson	Raab; Truss
Role split and merged into Minister of State for Asia and the Middle East and Minister of State for Europe and North America
Parliamentary Under-Secretary of State for North America, Sanctions and Consular Policy Role formed out of Minister of State for Europe and North America
Rehman Chishti		8 July 2022	7 September 2022	Conservative	Johnson	Truss
Minister of State for the Americas and the Overseas Territories
Jesse Norman		7 September 2022	26 October 2022	Conservative	Truss	Cleverly
Parliamentary Under-Secretary of State for Americas and Caribbean
David Rutley		27 October 2022	14 November 2023	Conservative	Sunak	Cleverly
Parliamentary Under-Secretary of State for Americas, Caribbean and Overseas Territories
David Rutley		14 November 2023	5 July 2024	Conservative	Sunak	Cameron
Parliamentary Under-Secretary of State for Latin America and Caribbean
Jenny Chapman, Baroness Chapman of Darlington		18 July 2024	28 February 2025	Labour	Starmer	Lammy
Minister of State for International Development, Latin America and Caribbean
Jenny Chapman, Baroness Chapman of Darlington		28 February 2025	5 September 2025	Labour	Starmer	Lammy
Parliamentary Under-Secretary of State for Multilateral, Human Rights, Latin America and the Caribbean
Chris Elmore		7 September 2025	20 July 2026	Labour	Starmer	Cooper
Parliamentary Under-Secretary of State for the Americas, Multilateral and Human Rights
Chris Elmore		20 July 2026	Incumbent	Labour	Burnham	Miliband

== See also ==
- Foreign, Commonwealth and Development Office
- Secretary of State for Foreign, Commonwealth and Development Affairs
- Minister of State for Europe
- Minister of State for Foreign Affairs
- Under-Secretary of State for Foreign Affairs
- Minister for Africa
