= Parliamentary Under-Secretary of State for Europe, Eastern Europe, International Security and Growth =

United Kingdom government ministerial position in the Foreign Office

United Kingdom Parliamentary Under-Secretary of State for Europe, Eastern Europe, International Security and Growth
- Royal Arms of His Majesty's Government

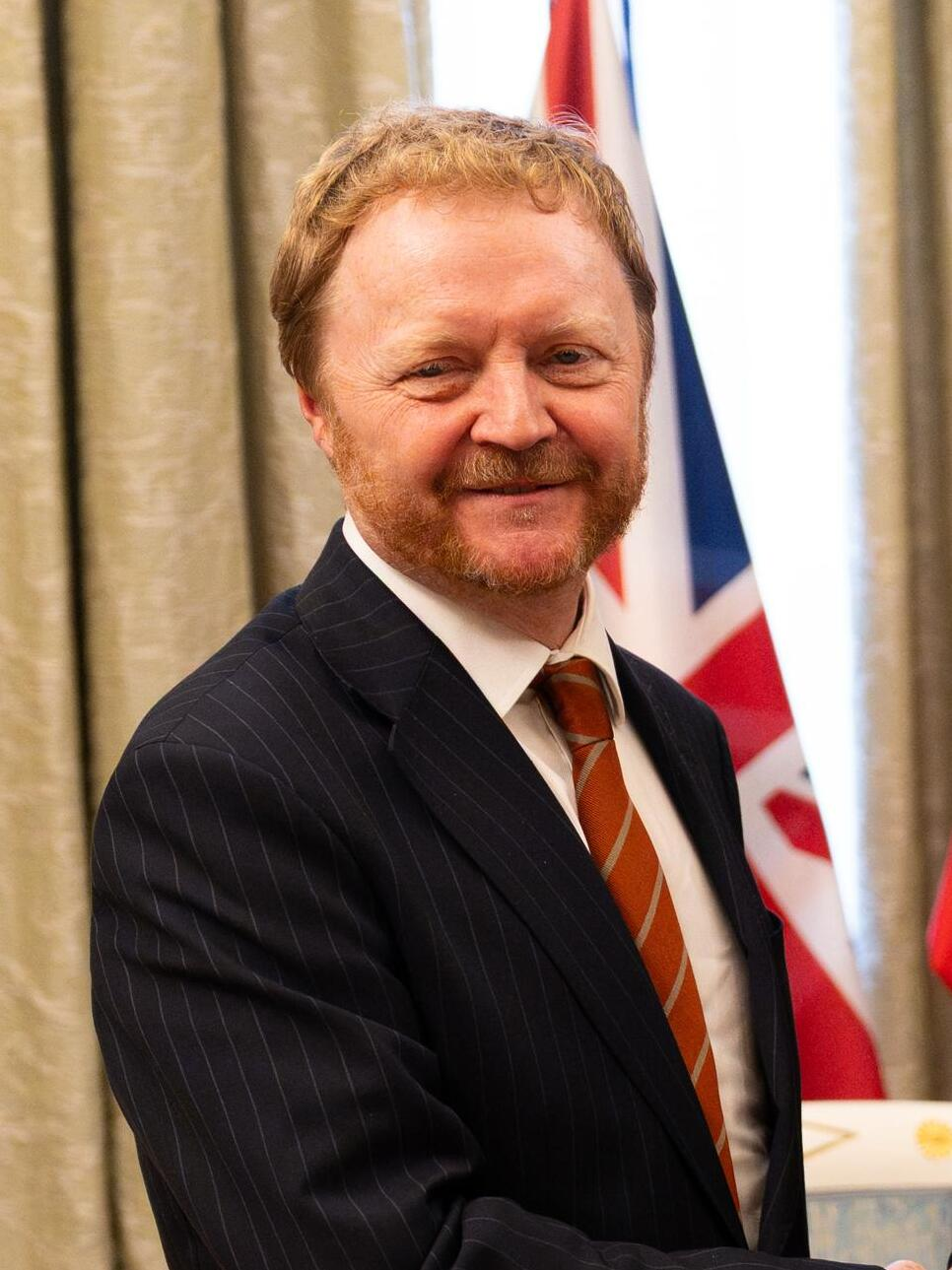
- Incumbent; Stewart Wood, Baron Wood of Anfield since 23 July 2026
- Foreign, Commonwealth and Development Office
- Status: Incumbent
- Reports to: Foreign Secretary
- Nominator: Secretary of State
- Appointer: The King (on the advice of the Prime Minister)
- Term length: At His Majesty's pleasure
- Formation: 1979
- First holder: Douglas Hurd
- Website: www.gov.uk/government/ministers/parliamentary-under-secretary-of-state--348

The parliamentary under-secretary of state for Europe, Eastern Europe, International Security and Growth, is a ministerial position within the Government of the United Kingdom, in charge of affairs with Europe. The minister can also be responsible for government policy towards European security; defence and international security; the Falkland Islands; polar regions; migration; protocol; human resources; OSCE and Council of Europe; relations with Parliament; British Overseas Territories of Gibraltar and Sovereign Base Areas in Cyprus; and FCO finance, knowledge and technology.

== History ==
The office currently a Minister of State at the Foreign, Commonwealth and Development Office. Despite being a junior ministerial role, the position has sometimes conferred the right to attend meetings of the Cabinet, which is occasionally granted to other such ministers at the Prime Minister's discretion. This first occurred when Denis MacShane was replaced by Douglas Alexander after the 2005 general election, although Alexander's successor ceased to have this right. When Chris Bryant held the office, it was not as Minister of State but as Parliamentary Under-Secretary of State for Europe and Asia.

The responsibilities of the office were next appointed to a Minister of State in 2010 by then Prime Minister David Cameron. He appointed David Lidington, who held the office for over six years. In July 2016, the responsibility for the relationship with the European Union, which represented the greater part of British policy towards Europe, became the brief of a new Cabinet level post, Secretary of State for Exiting the European Union, or more informally, Brexit Secretary. With the winding up of DEXEU, the department led by the Brexit Secretary, responsibility was transferred to the Cabinet Office, first under Michael Gove, and then under Lord Frost who was made a member of the Cabinet and held the ministerial position of Minister of State at the Cabinet Office. Through this period, any residual responsibilities for European relations that remained with the Foreign Office were combined with the portfolio of the traditionally more junior Minister of State for Foreign Affairs. The post of Minister of State for Europe and the Americas was held by Alan Duncan until he resigned on 22 July 2019; Duncan was largely regarded as the second most senior-ranking Foreign Office Minister behind the Foreign Secretary. On 25 July 2019, newly elected Prime Minister Boris Johnson appointed Conservative MP for Tamworth, Christopher Pincher to the role as part of his ministerial reshuffle. Johnson promoted Wendy Morton to the role of Parliamentary Under-Secretary of State for European Neighbourhood and the Americas to replace Pincher in February 2020. In December 2021, upon the resignation of Lord Frost, ministerial responsibility returned to the Foreign Secretary Liz Truss and Chris Heaton-Harris became Minister of State for Europe as responsibility for the United Kingdom's relations with the European Union was moved from the Cabinet Office back to the Foreign Office. In February 2022, James Cleverly was appointed Minister of State for Europe and North America. His former position as Minister of State for Middle East, North Africa and North America was the second highest position in the Foreign Office; his new position as Europe Minister then took its place as the deputy to the Foreign Secretary.

The post is not to be confused with the Minister of State within the Department for Exiting the European Union, the department created by Prime Minister Theresa May following the UK's vote to leave the EU in 2016 and abolished by Boris Johnson following the UK's exit from the EU on 31 January 2020. They supported the work of the department overseeing the UK's exit from the EU rather than overseeing government policy towards all-European affairs.

== List of ministers ==
Name	Portrait	Term of office		Political party	P.M.	F.Sec.
Minister of State for Europe
Douglas Hurd		4 May 1979	9 June 1983	Conservative	Thatcher	Carrington
Douglas Hurd		4 May 1979	9 June 1983	Conservative	Thatcher	Pym
Malcolm Rifkind		9 June 1983	11 January 1986	Conservative	Thatcher	Howe
Lynda Chalker		11 January 1986	24 July 1989	Conservative	Thatcher	Howe
Francis Maude		25 July 1989	28 November 1990	Conservative	Thatcher	Major
Francis Maude		25 July 1989	28 November 1990	Conservative	Thatcher	Hurd
Tristan Garel-Jones		28 November 1990	27 May 1993	Conservative	Major	Hurd
David Heathcoat-Amory		27 May 1993	20 July 1994	Conservative	Major	Hurd
David Davis		20 July 1994	2 May 1997	Conservative	Major	Hurd
David Davis		20 July 1994	2 May 1997	Conservative	Major	Rifkind
Doug Henderson		5 May 1997	28 July 1998	Labour	Blair	Cook
Joyce Quin		28 July 1998	28 July 1999	Labour	Blair	Cook
Geoff Hoon		28 July 1999	11 October 1999	Labour	Blair	Cook
Keith Vaz		11 October 1999	11 June 2001	Labour	Blair	Cook
Peter Hain		11 June 2001	24 October 2002	Labour	Blair	Straw
Denis MacShane		28 October 2002	11 May 2005	Labour	Blair	Straw
Douglas Alexander		11 May 2005	8 May 2006	Labour	Blair	Straw
Geoff Hoon		8 May 2006	28 June 2007	Labour	Blair	Beckett
Jim Murphy		28 June 2007	3 October 2008	Labour	Brown	Miliband
Caroline Flint		3 October 2008	5 June 2009	Labour	Brown	Miliband
Glenys Kinnock, Baroness Kinnock of Holyhead		5 June 2009	13 October 2009	Labour	Brown	Miliband
Parliamentary Under-Secretary of State for Europe and Asia
Chris Bryant		13 October 2009	11 May 2010	Labour	Brown	Miliband
Minister of State for Europe
David Lidington		12 May 2010	14 July 2016	Conservative	Cameron	Hague; Hammond
Minister of State for Europe and the Americas
Alan Duncan		15 July 2016	22 July 2019	Conservative	May	Johnson; Hunt
Christopher Pincher		25 July 2019	13 February 2020	Conservative	Johnson	Raab
Parliamentary Under-Secretary of State for European Neighbourhood and the Americas
Wendy Morton		13 February 2020	19 December 2021	Conservative	Johnson	Raab; Truss
Minister of State for Europe
Chris Heaton-Harris		19 December 2021	8 February 2022	Conservative	Johnson	Truss
Minister of State for Europe and North America
James Cleverly		8 February 2022	7 July 2022	Conservative	Johnson	Truss
Minister of State for Europe
Graham Stuart		7 July 2022	6 September 2022	Conservative	Johnson	Truss
Leo Docherty		7 September 2022	27 October 2022	Conservative	Truss	Cleverly
Parliamentary Under-Secretary of State for Europe
Leo Docherty		27 October 2022	26 March 2024	Conservative	Sunak	Cleverly; Cameron
Minister of State for Europe
Nus Ghani		26 March 2024	5 July 2024	Conservative	Sunak	Cameron
Minister of State for Europe, North America and Overseas Territories
Stephen Doughty		8 July 2024	20 July 2026	Labour	Starmer	Lammy; Cooper
Parliamentary Under-Secretary of State for Europe, Eastern Europe, International Security and Growth
Stewart Wood, Baron Wood of Anfield		23 July 2026	Incumbent	Labour	Burnham	Miliband

== See also ==
- Foreign, Commonwealth and Development Office
- Minister of State for European Affairs, the counterpart in Ireland
