= 2006 Stockport Metropolitan Borough Council election =

2006 local election in England

Stockport Council Election 2006
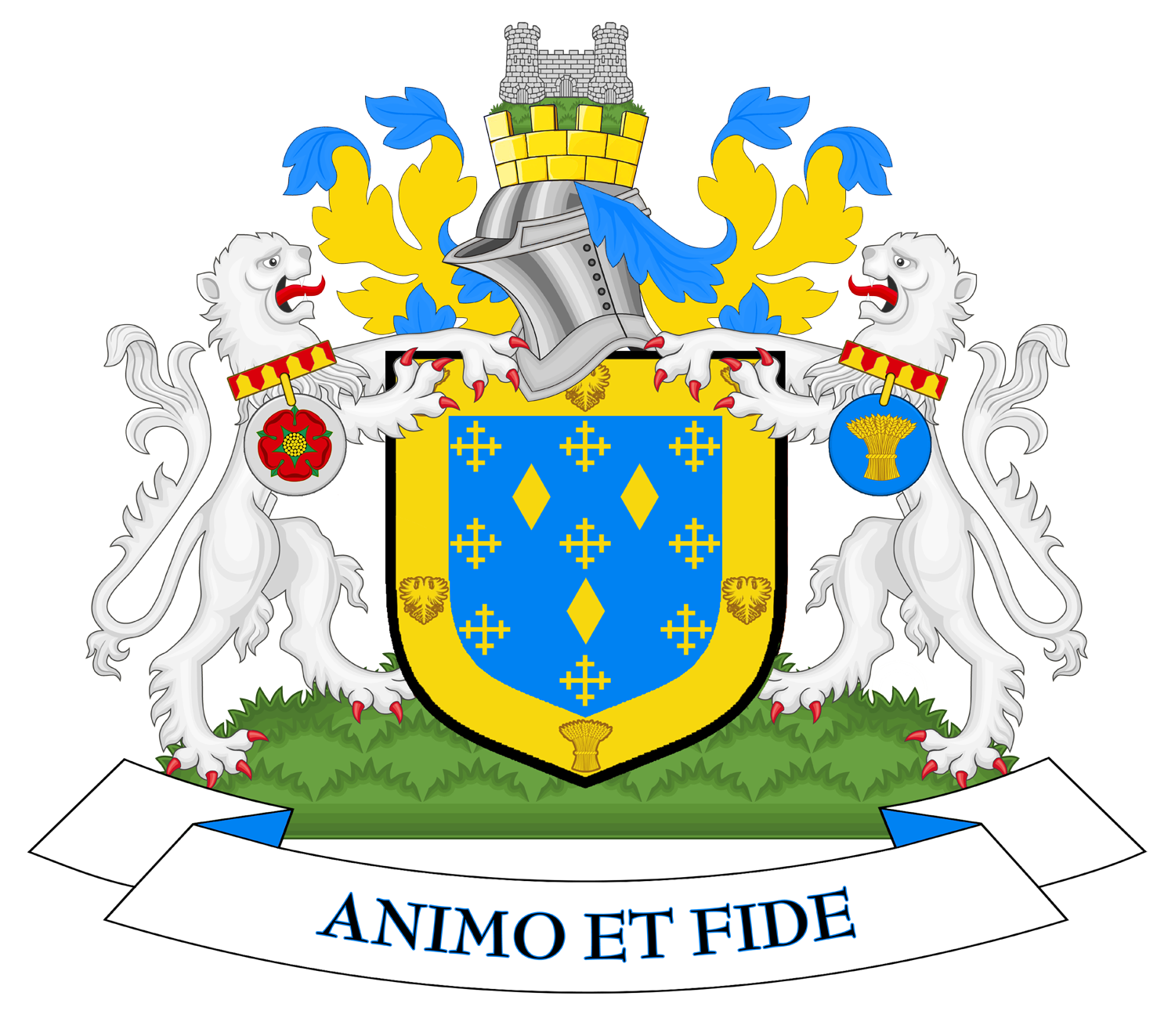
← 2004	4 May 2006	2007 →

21 Seats up for Election
	First party	Second party
Party	Liberal Democrats	Labour
Seats before	34	14
Seats won	11	5
Seats after	35	15
Seat change	Steady	▲1
	Third party	Fourth party
Party	Conservative	Heald Green Ratepayers
Seats before	10	3
Seats won	4	3
Seats after	10	3
Seat change	Steady	Steady
- Map showing the results of the 2006 Stockport Metropolitan Borough Council elections by ward. Red shows Labour seats, blue shows the Conservatives, yellow shows the Liberal Democrats and green the Heald Green Ratepayers.

The 2006 Stockport Metropolitan Borough Council election took place on 4 May 2006 to elect members of Stockport Metropolitan Borough Council in England. This was on the same day as other local elections. One third of the council was up for election, with each successful candidate serving a four-year term of office, expiring in 2010. The Liberal Democrats held overall control of the council.

== Result summary ==
Party	Seats	+/-	% votes
Liberal Democrat	35	0	
Labour	15	+1	
Conservative	10	0	
Heald Green Ratepayer	3	0	
Independent	0	-1	

== Ward results ==
=== Bramhall North ===
Bramhall North
Party	Candidate	Votes	%	±%
Conservative	Maureen Walsh*	2,349	47.3	
Liberal Democrats	Helen Foster-Grime	2,269	45.7	
Labour	Kathryn Ann Priestley	179	3.6	
UKIP	Malcom Crossley	172	3.5	
Majority		80		
Turnout			47.4	
Conservative hold		Swing		

=== Bramhall South and Woodford ===
Bramhall South and Woodford
Party	Candidate	Votes	%	±%
Conservative	John Leck*	2,606	52.8	
Liberal Democrats	Lenny Grice	2,044	41.4	
UKIP	David Michael Perry	146	3.0	
Labour	Beryl Dykes	142	2.9	
Majority		562		
Turnout			50.7	
Conservative hold		Swing		

=== Bredbury and Woodley ===
Bredbury and Woodley
Party	Candidate	Votes	%	±%
Liberal Democrats	C. Gordon*	1,933	61.1	
Conservative	K. Gibbons	749	23.7	
Labour	J. Humphries	482	15.2	
Majority		1,184		
Turnout			29.1	
Liberal Democrats hold		Swing		

=== Bredbury Green and Romiley ===
Bredbury Green and Romiley
Party	Candidate	Votes	%	±%
Conservative	S. Lloyd	1,868	48.2	
Liberal Democrats	B. Jones*	1,456	37.6	
Labour	P. Bray	551	14.2	
Majority		412		
Turnout			35.7	
Conservative gain from Liberal Democrats		Swing		

=== Brinnington and Central ===
Brinnington and Central
Party	Candidate	Votes	%	±%
Labour	Colin MacAlister*	1,081	51.1	
Liberal Democrats	P. Moss	732	34.6	
Conservative	B. Charlesworth	303	14.3	
Majority		349		
Turnout			21.3	
Labour hold		Swing		

=== Cheadle and Gatley ===
Cheadle and Gatley
Party	Candidate	Votes	%	±%
Liberal Democrats	Brian Millard*	2,372	49.6	
Conservative	C. Davenport	1,943	40.6	
Labour	C. Owen	469	9.8	
Majority		429		
Turnout			42.2	
Liberal Democrats hold		Swing		

=== Cheadle Hulme North ===
Cheadle Hulme North
Party	Candidate	Votes	%	±%
Liberal Democrats	June Somekh*	1,952	57.5	
Conservative	D. Cocker	1,084	32.0	
Labour	M. Miller	356	10.5	
Majority		868		
Turnout			34.0	
Liberal Democrats hold		Swing		

=== Cheadle Hulme South ===
Cheadle Hulme South
Party	Candidate	Votes	%	±%
Liberal Democrats	Stuart Bodsworth*	1,885	46.6	
Conservative	M. Roscoe	1,668	41.2	
Green	D. Leaver	248	6.1	
Labour	B. Hendley	246	6.1	
Majority		217		
Turnout			39.8	
Liberal Democrats hold		Swing		

=== Davenport and Cale Green ===
Davenport and Cale Green
Party	Candidate	Votes	%	±%
Liberal Democrats	David White*	1,437	48.2	
Labour	S. Mealey	971	32.6	
Conservative	C. Holgate	572	19.2	
Majority		466		
Turnout			28.4	
Liberal Democrats hold		Swing		

=== Edgeley and Cheadle Heath ===
Edgeley and Cheadle Heath
Party	Candidate	Votes	%	±%
Labour	Philip Harding*	1,486	48.0	
Liberal Democrats	C. Smith	548	17.7	
Conservative	S. Holgate	439	14.2	
Independent	P. Behan	344	11.1	
Green	M. Cole	280	9.0	
Majority		938		
Turnout			28.8	
Labour hold		Swing		

=== Hazel Grove ===
Hazel Grove
Party	Candidate	Votes	%	±%
Liberal Democrats	Stuart Corris*	2,281	53.9	
Conservative	J. Lewis-Booth	1,509	35.7	
Labour	Y. Bradley	296	7.0	
Independent	D. Ryan	142	3.4	
Majority		772		
Turnout			39.3	
Liberal Democrats hold		Swing		

=== Heald Green ===
Heald Green
Party	Candidate	Votes	%	±%
Heald Green Ratepayers	D. Whitehead*	2,199	63.9	
Liberal Democrats	D. Robert-Jones	587	17.0	
Conservative	R. Stevenson	436	12.6	
Labour	M. Junejo	227	6.6	
Majority		1,612		
Turnout			35.0	
Heald Green Ratepayers hold		Swing		

=== Heatons North ===
Heatons North
Party	Candidate	Votes	%	±%
Conservative	Anthony O'Neill*	1,922	49.3	
Labour	M. Pollard	1,031	26.5	
Liberal Democrats	C. Walker	541	13.9	
Green	J. Cuff	401	10.3	
Majority		891		
Turnout			36.4	
Conservative hold		Swing		

=== Heatons South ===
Heatons South
Party	Candidate	Votes	%	±%
Labour	Tom McGee	1,488	37.5	
Conservative	David Foulkes*	1,378	34.8	
Liberal Democrats	L. Floodgate	742	18.7	
Green	A. Hardman	357	9.0	
Majority		110		
Turnout			36.9	
Labour gain from Conservative		Swing		

=== Manor ===
Manor
Party	Candidate	Votes	%	±%
Liberal Democrats	C. Blackburn	1,407	42.4	
Labour	B. Lechner	909	27.4	
BNP	D. Warner	461	13.9	
Conservative	B. Charlesworth	424	12.8	
Independent	S. Ryan	118	3.6	
Majority		498		
Turnout			31.8	
Liberal Democrats hold		Swing		

=== Marple North ===
Marple North
Party	Candidate	Votes	%	±%
Liberal Democrats	Craig Wright	2,105	52.0	
Conservative	N. Menzies	1,177	29.1	
Green	M. Preston	409	10.1	
Labour	S. Townsend	201	5.0	
Independent	L. Russell	155	3.8	
Majority		928		
Turnout			42.7	
Liberal Democrats hold		Swing		

=== Marple South ===
Marple South
Party	Candidate	Votes	%	±%
Liberal Democrats	Sue Ingham	2,060	52.4	
Conservative	K. Labrey	1,394	35.5	
Green	G. Reid	284	7.2	
Labour	D. Rowbottm	191	4.9	
Majority		666		
Turnout			40.9	
Liberal Democrats hold		Swing		

=== Offerton ===
Offerton
Party	Candidate	Votes	%	±%
Liberal Democrats	John Smith	1,311	40.3	
Independent	T. Pyle*	1,013	31.1	
Conservative	G. Cameron	580	17.8	
Labour	S. Ball	351	10.8	
Majority		298		
Turnout			31.3	
Liberal Democrats gain from Independent		Swing		

=== Reddish North ===
Reddish North
Party	Candidate	Votes	%	±%
Labour	Peter Scott*	1,550	57.7	
Conservative	J. Whelan	718	26.7	
Liberal Democrats	J. White	420	15.6	
Majority		832		
Turnout			25.8	
Labour hold		Swing		

=== Reddish South ===
Reddish South
Party	Candidate	Votes	%	±%
Labour	Tom Grundy*	1,379	47.7	
Conservative	A. Hannay	655	22.7	
Liberal Democrats	M. Gordon	466	16.1	
UKIP	G. Price	391	13.5	
Majority		724		
Turnout			27.3	
Labour hold		Swing		

=== Stepping Hill ===
Stepping Hill
Party	Candidate	Votes	%	±%
Liberal Democrats	M. Weldon*	1,566	39.4	
Conservative	L. Holt	1,456	36.7	
Labour	J. Rothwell	479	12.1	
Green	K. Pease	266	6.7	
UKIP	A. Moore	155	3.9	
Independent	B. Russell	50	1.3	
Majority		110		
Turnout			40.2	
Liberal Democrats hold		Swing		
