= Stepping Hill =

- Electoral ward
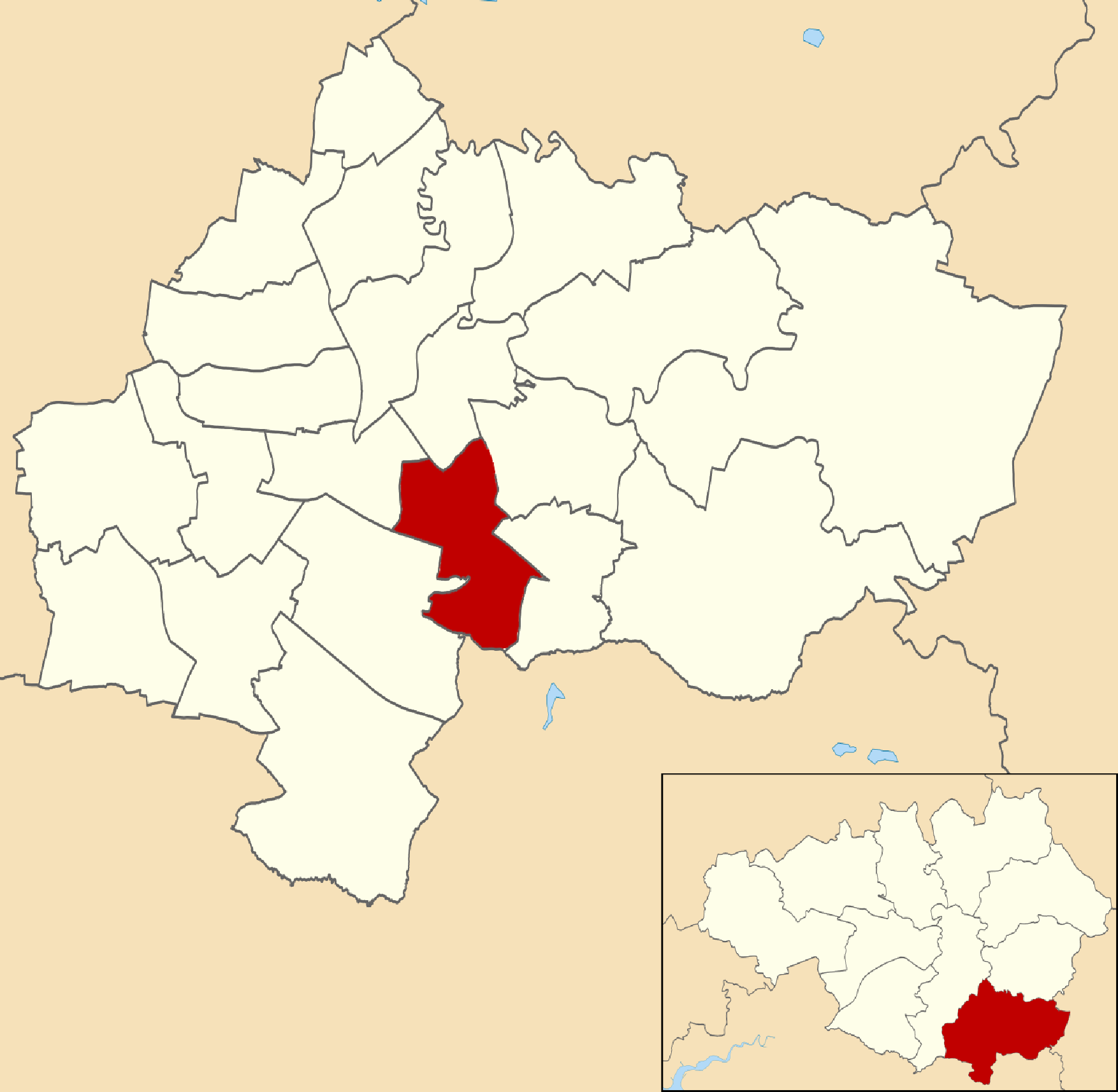
- Former boundaries of Stepping Hill within Stockport
- Population: 9,834 (2010)
- Country: England
- Sovereign state: United Kingdom
- UK Parliament: Cheadle

Stepping Hill was an electoral ward in the Metropolitan Borough of Stockport, England, created for the 2004 Stockport Metropolitan Borough Council election. It elected three councillors to Stockport Metropolitan Borough Council using the first past the post electoral method, electing one councillor every year without election on the fourth. The ward was abolished in boundary changes before the 2023 Stockport Metropolitan Borough Council election and split up, with the largest part of it going to the new ward of Norbury & Woodsmoor. Parts of Great Moor and Little Moor within the ward were moved into the Offerton ward, and a small area into the Hazel Grove ward.

The ward was bordered by Hazel Grove, Bramhall North, Davenport & Cale Green, Manor and Offerton, and included Stepping Hill Hospital. Together with Bramhall North, Bramhall South, Cheadle and Gatley, Cheadle Hulme North, Cheadle Hulme South, and Heald Green wards, it made up the Cheadle Parliamentary constituency.

== Councillors ==
Stepping Hill electoral ward was represented in Westminster by the Member of Parliament for Cheadle.

The ward was represented on Stockport Council by three councillors, and throughout its history was represented by councillors from the Liberal Democrats, Conservative Party, and the Labour Party.

In the 2023 local elections, all three of the sitting councillors for the ward and two of its former councillors sought re-election in new wards.

- Grace Baynham was elected to represent the new ward of Norbury & Woodsmoor.
- Christine Carrigan was elected to represent Brinnington & Central.
- Rory Leonard was defeated in the election for Edgeley.
- Mark Weldon was defeated in the election for Offerton.
- John Wright was defeated in the election for Norbury & Woodsmoor.

Election	Councillor	Councillor	Councillor
2004	Mark Weldon (Lib Dem)	Ben Alexander (Lib Dem)	Maggie Clay (Lib Dem)
2006	Mark Weldon (Lib Dem)	Ben Alexander (Lib Dem)	Maggie Clay (Lib Dem)
2007	Mark Weldon (Lib Dem)	Ben Alexander (Lib Dem)	Maggie Clay (Lib Dem)
2008	Mark Weldon (Lib Dem)	Ben Alexander (Lib Dem)	Maggie Clay (Lib Dem)
By-election; 11 June 2009	Mark Weldon (Lib Dem)	Ben Alexander (Lib Dem)	Wendy Orrell (Lib Dem)
2010	Mark Weldon (Lib Dem)	Ben Alexander (Lib Dem)	Wendy Orrell (Lib Dem)
2011	Mark Weldon (Lib Dem)	Ben Alexander (Lib Dem)	Wendy Orrell (Lib Dem)
2012	Mark Weldon (Lib Dem)	Ben Alexander (Lib Dem)	Wendy Orrell (Lib Dem)
2014	John Wright (Con)	Ben Alexander (Lib Dem)	Wendy Orrell (Lib Dem)
2015	John Wright (Con)	Paul Hadfield (Con)	Wendy Orrell (Lib Dem)
2016	John Wright (Con)	Paul Hadfield (Con)	Mark Weldon (Lib Dem)
2018	John Wright (Con)	Paul Hadfield (Con)	Mark Weldon (Lib Dem)
2019	John Wright (Con)	Grace Baynham (Lib Dem)	Mark Weldon (Lib Dem)
2021	John Wright (Con)	Grace Baynham (Lib Dem)	Rory Leonard (Lab)
2022	Christine Carrigan (Lab)	Grace Baynham (Lib Dem)	Rory Leonard (Lab)

indicates seat up for re-election. indicates seat won in by-election.

== Elections in the 2010s ==
=== May 2021 ===
2021
Party	Candidate	Votes	%	±%
Labour	Rory Leonard	1,639	35	+9
Conservative	Paul Robert Hadfield	1,532	32	+2
Liberal Democrats	Mark Edward Weldon	1,337	26	−9
Green	Ken George Pease	225	5%	−2
Majority		107		
Turnout		4,733	46	+7
Labour gain from Liberal Democrats		Swing		

=== May 2019 ===
2019
Party	Candidate	Votes	%	±%
Liberal Democrats	Grace Baynham	1,452	37	
Conservative	Paul Robert Hadfield	1,165	30	
Labour	Drew Carswell	1,021	26	
Green	Ken George Pease	280	7	
Majority		287		
Turnout		3,918	39	
Liberal Democrats gain from Conservative		Swing		

=== May 2018 ===
2018
Party	Candidate	Votes	%	±%
Conservative	John Wright	1,457	37	
Liberal Democrats	Grace Baynham	1,355	35	
Labour	Dena Ryness	960	24	
Green	Steve Torley	149	4	
Majority		102		
Turnout		4,128	42	
Conservative hold		Swing		

=== May 2016 ===
2016
Party	Candidate	Votes	%	±%
Liberal Democrats	Mark Weldon	1,592	39	
Conservative	Jon Shaw	1,221	30	
Labour	Dena Ryness	712	17	
UKIP	Izzy Bolton	387	9	
Green	Steve Torley	206	5	
Majority		371		
Turnout		4,128	42	
Liberal Democrats hold		Swing		

=== May 2015 ===
2015
Party	Candidate	Votes	%	±%
Conservative	Paul Hadfield	2,284	32	
Liberal Democrats	Ben Alexander	2,121	30	
Labour	Janet Rothwell	1,596	22	
UKIP	Izzy Bolton	730	10	
Green	Stephen Torley	376	5	
Majority		163		
Turnout		7,107	71	
Conservative gain from Liberal Democrats		Swing		

=== May 2014 ===
2014
Party	Candidate	Votes	%	±%
Conservative	John Douglas Wright	1,316	33%	+6.76%
Liberal Democrats	Mark Edward Weldon	1279	32%	−7.07%
Labour	Janet Mary Rothwell	1054	26%	+3.61%
Green	Ken Pease	381	9%	+2.88%
Majority		37	1%	
Turnout		4030		
Conservative gain from Liberal Democrats		Swing		

=== May 2012 ===
2012
Party	Candidate	Votes	%	±%
Liberal Democrats	Wendy Orrell	1,422	39.07	−14.40
Conservative	John Wright	955	26.24	−10.34
Labour	Janet Rothwell	815	22.39	+16.38
UKIP	Izzy Bolton	229	6.29	N/A
Green	Ken Pease	219	6.02	+2.07
Majority		467	12.83	
Turnout		3,654	37.50	
Liberal Democrats hold		Swing		

=== May 2011 ===
2011
Party	Candidate	Votes	%	±%
Liberal Democrats	Ben Alexander	1,786	39.2	
Conservative	John Wright	1,406	30.9	
Labour	Janet Rothwell	935	20.5	
Green	Ken Pease	155	3.4	
UKIP	Izzy Bolton	150	3.3	
BNP	Alan Carney	96	2.1	
Majority		380		
Turnout		4,552	46.33	
Liberal Democrats hold		Swing		
