= 2018 Stockport Metropolitan Borough Council election =

2018 local election in England

Stockport Metropolitan Council Election 2018
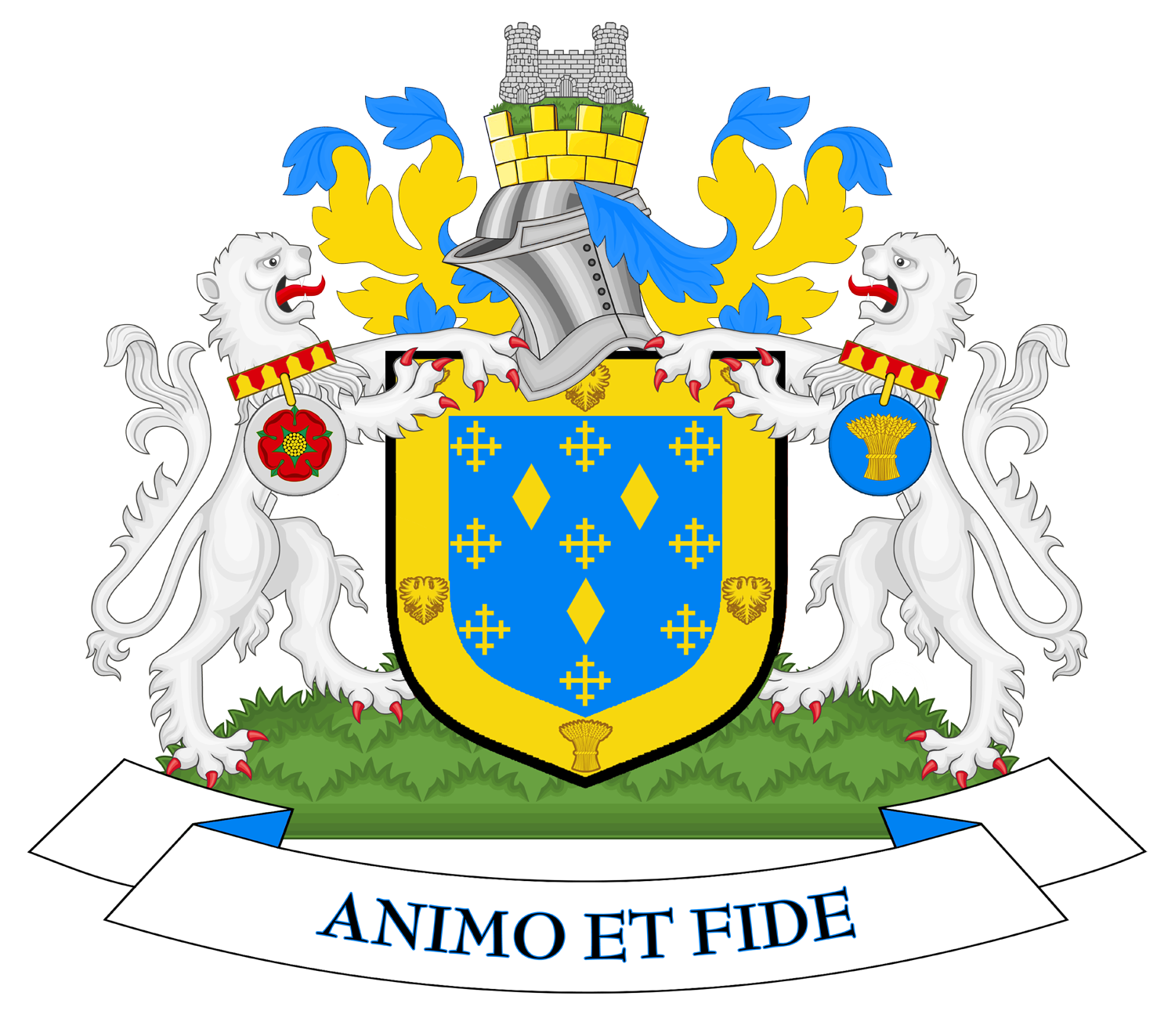
- 3 May 2018

20 Seats up for Election
	First party	Second party
Party	Labour	Liberal Democrats
Seats before	23	20
Seats won	9	8
Seats after	24	21
Seat change	▲1	▲1
Popular vote	26,043	24,632
Percentage	33.5%	31.7%
	Third party	Fourth party
Party	Conservative	Heald Green Ratepayers
Seats before	14	3
Seats won	3	1
Seats after	13	3
Seat change	▼1	Steady
Popular vote	21,187	2,056
Percentage	27.3%	2.6%
- Map showing the results of the 2018 Stockport Metropolitan Borough Council elections by ward. Red shows Labour seats, blue shows the Conservatives, yellow shows the Liberal Democrats and green the Heald Green Ratepayers. White indicates the vacant seat in Edgeley & Cheadle Heath.
Leader of the Council before election
Alex Ganotis
Labour
Leader of the Council
Alex Ganotis
Labour

The 2018 Stockport Metropolitan Borough Council election took place on 3 May 2018 to elect members of Stockport Metropolitan Borough Council in England. This was on the same day as other local elections. Stockport Council is elected in thirds, which means that in each three member local ward, one councillor is elected every year, except every four years which is classed as a fallow year. The last fallow year was 2017, when no local government elections took place in the borough. Those councillors elected in 2018 will serve a four-year term, expiring in 2022. The election in Edgeley & Cheadle Heath was deferred, owing to the death of the Conservative candidate, until 24 May 2018.

After the election, the Labour minority administration that had governed since 2016 was able to continue in office, although without a majority the administrations budget was voted down in March 2019, the first time this had happened since the 1980s.

== Election results by ward ==
Asterisk (*) indicates incumbent in the Ward, and Bold names highlight winning candidate.

=== Bramhall North ===
Bramhall North
Party	Candidate	Votes	%	±%
Conservative	Lisa Walker*	2,269	53	−
Liberal Democrats	Richard Flowers	1,300	30	+4
Labour	Janet Mobbs	515	12	+2
Green	Deborah Hind	206	5	+1
Majority		969		
Turnout		4,289	41	
Conservative hold		Swing		

=== Bramhall South ===
Bramhall South and Woodford
Party	Candidate	Votes	%	±%
Conservative	John McGahan*	2,354	53	+9
Liberal Democrats	Jeremy Meal	1,598	36	−1
Labour	Khalid Ahmed	340	8	+2
Green	Malcolm Brown	113	3	−
UKIP	David Perry	52	1	−4
Majority		756		
Turnout		4,457	46	
Conservative hold		Swing		

=== Bredbury and Woodley ===
Bredbury and Woodley
Party	Candidate	Votes	%	±%
Liberal Democrats	Chris Gordon*	1,702	54	+9
Conservative	Richard Ellis	668	21	+3
Labour	Nav Mishra	610	19	−1
Green	Conrad Beard	156	5	+2
Majority		1,034		
Turnout		3,136	29	
Liberal Democrats hold		Swing		

=== Bredbury Green and Romiley ===
Bredbury Green and Romiley
Party	Candidate	Votes	%	±%
Liberal Democrats	Angie Clark	2,014	51	−
Conservative	Nicki Baines	1,130	29	−3
Labour	Laura Clingan	625	16	+3
Green	Trevor Smith	142	4	+1
Majority		884		
Turnout		3,911	35	
Liberal Democrats gain from Independent		Swing		

=== Brinnington and Central ===
Brinnington and Central
Party	Candidate	Votes	%	±%
Labour	Becky Crawford*	1,745	78	+1
Conservative	Ros Lloyd	337	15	+4
Liberal Democrats	Alex Orndal	161	7	N/A
Majority		1,408		
Turnout		2,243	21	
Labour hold		Swing		

=== Cheadle and Gatley ===
Cheadle and Gatley
Party	Candidate	Votes	%	±%
Liberal Democrats	Iain Roberts*	2,281	47	+5
Conservative	Jon Shaw	1,420	29	−2
Labour	Colin Owen	1,047	22	+5
Green	Karl Wardlaw	99	2	−1
Majority		861		
Turnout		4,847	41	
Liberal Democrats hold		Swing		

=== Cheadle Hulme North ===
Cheadle Hulme North
Party	Candidate	Votes	%	±%
Labour Co-op	David Meller	1,577	39	+17
Liberal Democrats	Claire Halliwell	1,575	39	−8
Conservative	Bob Stevenson	684	17	+1
Green	Michael Padfield	101	3	−1
UKIP	Taff Davies	71	2	−9
Majority		2		
Turnout		4,008	40	
Labour Co-op gain from Liberal Democrats		Swing		

=== Cheadle Hulme South ===
Cheadle Hulme South
Party	Candidate	Votes	%	±%
Liberal Democrats	Helen Foster-Grime	2,267	56	−4
Conservative	Sue Carroll	1,144	28	+5
Labour	Anthony Hay	424	10	+3
Green	Clare Brown	142	3	−
UKIP	Cyril Peake	92	2	−5
Majority		1,123		
Turnout		4,069	38	
Liberal Democrats gain from Labour		Swing		

=== Davenport and Cale Green ===
Davenport and Cale Green
Party	Candidate	Votes	%	±%
Labour	Elise Wilson*	2,019	66	+9
Conservative	Daniel Hamilton	561	18	+7
Liberal Democrats	Natalie Bird	302	10	−2
Green	Chris Gibbins	179	6	−
Majority		1,458		
Turnout		3,061	28	
Labour hold		Swing		

=== Hazel Grove ===
Hazel Grove
Party	Candidate	Votes	%	±%
Liberal Democrats	Paul Ankers	1,965	44	+5
Conservative	Oliver Johnstone*	1,810	41	+8
Labour	Julie Wharton	553	12	−2
Green	Ken Pease	132	3	−
Majority		155		
Turnout		4,460	41	
Liberal Democrats gain from Conservative		Swing		

=== Heald Green ===
Heald Green
Party	Candidate	Votes	%	±%
Heald Green Ratepayers	Adrian Nottingham*	2,056	59	+5
Labour	Laith Gibani	608	17	+1
Conservative	Yvonne Salmons	416	12	+1
Liberal Democrats	Anna Walker	203	6	−2
Green	Richard Brown	114	3	+1
UKIP	Tony Moore	82	2	−7
Majority		1,448		
Turnout		3,479	35	
Heald Green Ratepayers hold		Swing		

=== Heatons North ===
Heatons North
Party	Candidate	Votes	%	±%
Labour	John Taylor*	2,436	61	−
Conservative	Pamela Haworth	909	23	−2
Green	Janet Cuff	238	6	−3
Liberal Democrats	Jenny Humphreys	222	6	+1
Women's Equality	Diane Coffey	212	5	N/A
Majority		1,527		
Turnout		4,017	37	
Labour hold		Swing		

=== Heatons South ===
Heatons South
Party	Candidate	Votes	%	±%
Labour	Tom McGee*	2,706	66	−2
Conservative	Paula Timperley	859	21	+2
Green	Samuel Dugdale	269	7	+1
Liberal Democrats	Charles Gibson	236	6	−1
Majority		1,847		
Turnout		4,070	37	
Labour hold		Swing		

=== Manor ===
Manor
Party	Candidate	Votes	%	±%
Labour	Amanda Peers	1,630	55	+11
Liberal Democrats	James Feetham	769	26	−6
Conservative	Janice McGahan	398	13	+7
Green	Cliff Lee	123	4	+1
End Austerity	John Pearson	51	2	N/A
Majority		861		
Turnout		2,971	28	
Labour gain from Liberal Democrats		Swing		

=== Marple North ===
Marple North
Party	Candidate	Votes	%	±%
Liberal Democrats	Steve Gribbon	2,213	48	+6
Conservative	Hannah Sneddon	1,115	24	−5
Labour	Chris Gleeson	810	18	+7
Green	Carolyn Leather	239	5	+1
Independent	Kevin Dowling	192	4	−3
Majority		1,098		
Turnout		4,569	49	
Liberal Democrats hold		Swing		

=== Marple South ===
Marple South and High Lane
Party	Candidate	Votes	%	±%
Liberal Democrats	Colin Macalister	2,026	42	+6
Conservative	Yvonne Collier	1,871	39	+2
Labour	Christopher Wallis	756	16	+3
Green	Robbie Lee	138	3	−1
Majority		155		
Turnout		4,791	48	
Liberal Democrats hold		Swing		

=== Offerton ===
Offerton
Party	Candidate	Votes	%	±%
Liberal Democrats	Will Dawson	1,973	52	+17
Labour	Dan Oliver	1,117	30	+3
Conservative	Darran Palmer	587	16	−1
Green	Simon Edge	89	2	−
Majority		856		
Turnout		3,766	34	
Liberal Democrats hold		Swing		

=== Reddish North ===
Reddish North
Party	Candidate	Votes	%	±%
Labour	David Wilson*	1,940	73	+17
Conservative	Beverley Oliver	424	16	+7
Green	Helena Mellish	187	7	+4
Liberal Democrats	Mark Jones	98	4	+1
Majority		1,516		
Turnout		2,649	25	
Labour hold		Swing		

=== Reddish South ===
Reddish South
Party	Candidate	Votes	%	±%
Labour	Jude Wells	1,916	64	+6
Conservative	David Dowse	578	19	+5
Green	Gary Lawson	176	6	−1
Liberal Democrats	Gemma-Jane Bowker	169	6	−
UKIP	Joshua Seddon	147	5	−9
Majority		1,338		
Turnout		2,986	29	
Labour hold		Swing		

=== Stepping Hill ===
Stepping Hill
Party	Candidate	Votes	%	±%
Conservative	John Wright*	1,457	37	+7
Liberal Democrats	Grace Baynham	1,355	35	−4
Labour	Dena Ryness	960	24	+7
Green	Steve Torley	149	4	−1
Majority		102		
Turnout		3,921	42	
Conservative hold		Swing		

== Deferred election ==
=== Edgeley and Cheadle Heath ===
On 17 April 2018, Stockport Council published a notice to confirm that due to the death of the Conservative candidate Maureen Baldwin-Moore the scheduled election for this ward would no longer take place on 3 May 2018, and that a new poll would take place on 24 May 2018. Under the Electoral Administration Act, the Conservatives were allowed to select a replacement candidate, but new nominations by other parties were not permitted.

Edgeley & Cheadle Heath
Party	Candidate	Votes	%	±%
Labour	Philip Harding*	1,709	74	+6
Liberal Democrats	Oliver Harrison	203	9	+3
Conservative	Pat Leck	187	8	−
Green	Camilla Luff	144	6	−
UKIP	Peter Behan	71	3	−9
Majority		1,506		
Turnout		2,314	22	
Labour hold		Swing		
