= Bredbury and Woodley =

Electoral division of Stockport, England

Bredbury & Woodley
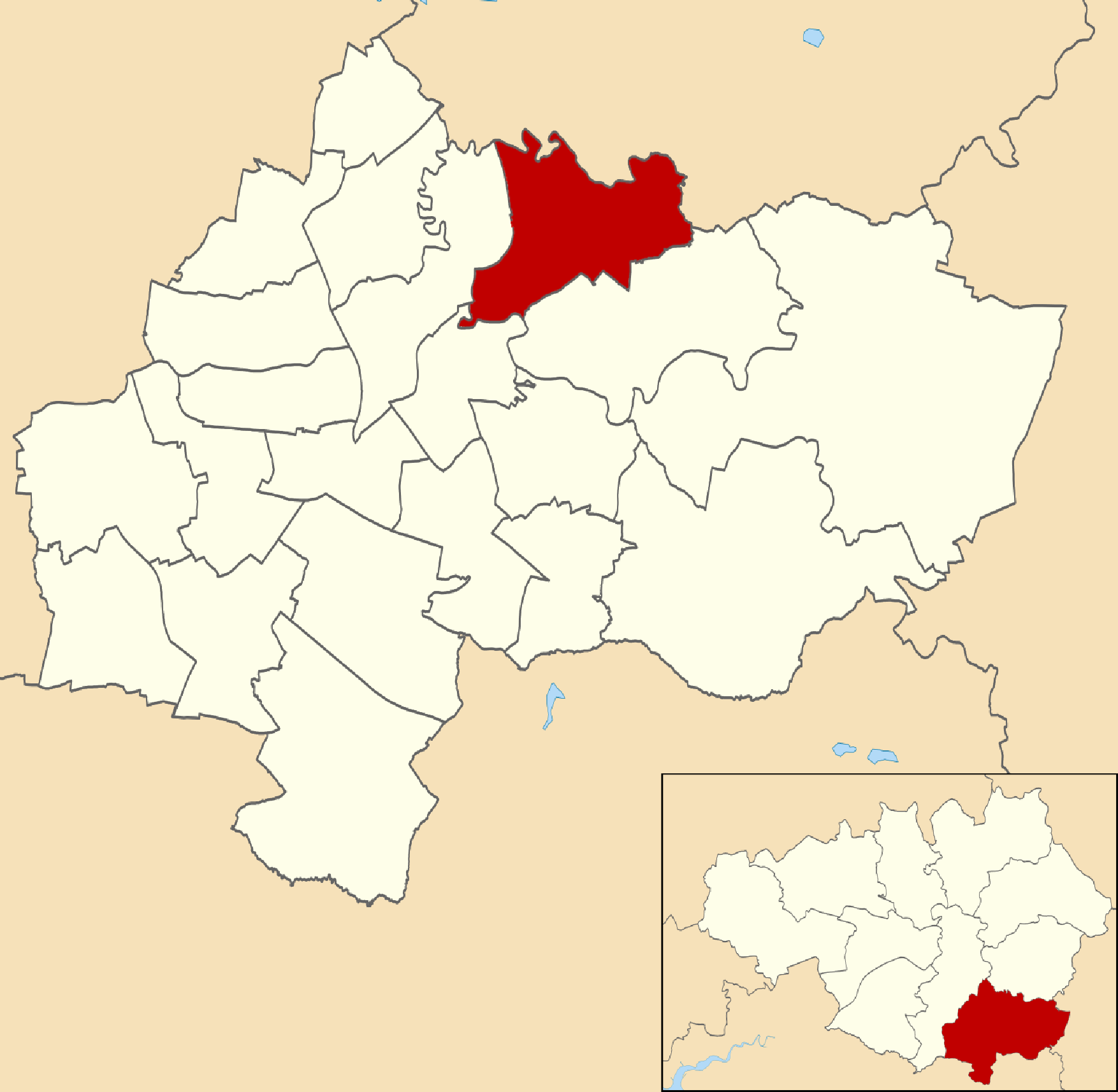
- Bredbury & Woodley within Stockport
- Population: 10,946 (2010)
- Country: England
- Sovereign state: United Kingdom
- UK Parliament: Hazel Grove
- Councillors: Joe Barrattt (Liberal Democrat); Rosemary Barratt (Independent); Niki Meerman (Liberal Democrat)

Bredbury and Woodley is an electoral ward in the Metropolitan Borough of Stockport. It elects three Councillors to Stockport Metropolitan Borough Council using the first past the post electoral method, electing one Councillor every year without election on the fourth.

The ward is located in the east of Stockport, and is bordered by Bredbury Green & Romiley, and Brinnington & Central wards. Together with Bredbury Green and Romiley, Hazel Grove, Manor, Marple North, Marple South and High Lane, and Offerton, as well as part of the Norbury and Woodsmoor ward, it constitutes the Hazel Grove Parliamentary constituency. The ward has two train stations, Bredbury Station and Woodley, both offering regular services to Manchester, and towards Sheffield.

== Councillors ==
Bredbury and Woodley electoral ward is represented in Westminster by Lisa Smart MP for Hazel Grove.

The ward is represented on Stockport Council by three councillors: Joe Barratt (Independent), Sue Thorpe (Lib Dem), and Rosemary Barratt (Independent). Joe Barratt and Rosemary Barratt were elected as Labour councillors, but left the party in September 2025.

Election	Councillor	Councillor	Councillor
2004	Chris Gordon (Lib Dem)	Michael Wilson (Lib Dem)	Stella Humphries (Lib Dem)
2006	Chris Gordon (Lib Dem)	Michael Wilson (Lib Dem)	Stella Humphries (Lib Dem)
2007	Chris Gordon (Lib Dem)	Michael Wilson (Lib Dem)	Stella Humphries (Lib Dem)
2008	Chris Gordon (Lib Dem)	Michael Wilson (Lib Dem)	Stella Humphries (Lib Dem)
2010	Chris Gordon (Lib Dem)	Michael Wilson (Lib Dem)	Stella Humphries (Lib Dem)
2011	Chris Gordon (Lib Dem)	Michael Wilson (Lib Dem)	Stella Humphries (Lib Dem)
2012	Chris Gordon (Lib Dem)	Michael Wilson (Lib Dem)	Christine Corris (Lib Dem)
2014	Chris Gordon (Lib Dem)	Michael Wilson (Lib Dem)	Christine Corris (Lib Dem)
2015	Chris Gordon (Lib Dem)	Stuart Corris (Lib Dem)	Christine Corris (Lib Dem)
2016	Chris Gordon (Lib Dem)	Stuart Corris (Lib Dem)	Christine Corris (Lib Dem)
2018	Chris Gordon (Lib Dem)	Stuart Corris (Lib Dem)	Christine Corris (Lib Dem)
2019	Chris Gordon (Lib Dem)	Stuart Corris (Lib Dem)	Christine Corris (Lib Dem)
2021	Chris Gordon (Lib Dem)	Stuart Corris (Lib Dem)	Sue Thorpe (Lib Dem)
2022	Vince Shaw (Lib Dem)	Stuart Corris (Lib Dem)	Sue Thorpe (Lib Dem)
2023	Joe Barratt (Labour)	Sue Thorpe (Lib Dem)	Rosemary Barratt (Labour)
2024	Joe Barratt (Independent)	Sue Thorpe (Lib Dem)	Rosemary Barratt (Independent)

indicates seat up for re-election.

== Elections in the 2020s ==
=== May 2024 ===
Bredbury & Woodley
Party	Candidate	Votes	%	±%
Labour	Rosemary Barratt*	1,756	47.4	+8.3
Liberal Democrats	Dan Willis	1,269	34.2	−2.5
Conservative	Bernie Wylde	501	13.5	+2.3
Green	Michael Padfield	180	4.8	−3.4
Majority		487	13.2	
Turnout		3,757	34.4	−0.2
Registered electors		10,900		
Labour hold		Swing		

=== May 2023 ===
Bredbury & Woodley (3)
Party	Candidate	Votes	%
Labour	Joe Barratt	1,639	43.3
Liberal Democrats	Sue Thorpe	1,598	42.2
Labour	Rosemary Barratt	1,479	39.1
Liberal Democrats	James Epps	1,390	36.7
Liberal Democrats	Dan Willis	1,388	36.7
Labour	Charlotte Price	1,238	32.7
Conservative	Tim Morley	515	13.6
Conservative	Michael Lyons	480	12.7
Conservative	Bernie Wylde	424	11.2
Green	Alex Crompton	312	8.2
Independent	Sue Chatton	243	6.4
Rejected ballots		12	
Turnout		3,785	34.6
Total votes		10,706	
Registered electors		10,952	
Labour win (new seat)			
Liberal Democrats win (new seat)			
Labour win (new seat)			

=== May 2022 ===
Bredbury and Woodley
Party	Candidate	Votes	%	±%
Liberal Democrats	Vince Shaw	1,532	41.1	−8
Labour	Joe Barratt	1,296	34.8	+15
Conservative	Tim Morley	735	19.7	−6
Green	Stephanie Wyatt	147	3.9	−1
Majority		236	6.3	
Rejected ballots		17	0.5	
Turnout		3,727	35.1	+1
Registered electors		10,616		
Liberal Democrats hold		Swing		

=== May 2021 (delayed from May 2020 due to COVID) ===
Bredbury and Woodley
Party	Candidate	Votes	%	±%
Liberal Democrats	Sue Thorpe	1,749	49	−4
Conservative	Timothy Morley	921	26	+13
Labour	Louise Heywood	718	20	+5
Green	Stephanie Wyatt	183	5	−1
Majority		828		
Turnout		3,592	34	
Registered electors		10,670		
Liberal Democrats hold		Swing		

== Elections in the 2010s ==
=== May 2019 ===
2019
Party	Candidate	Votes	%	±%
Liberal Democrats	Stuart Corris	1,608	53	
Labour	Holly Patricia McCormack	470	15	
Conservative	Susan Ann Howard	403	13	
UKIP	Vernon Bailey	396	13	
Green	Conrad Clive Beard	185	5	
Majority		1,138		
Turnout		3,062	29	
Liberal Democrats hold		Swing		

=== May 2018 ===
2018
Party	Candidate	Votes	%	±%
Liberal Democrats	Chris Gordon	1,702	54	
Conservative	Richard Ellis	668	21	
Labour	Nav Mishra	610	19	
Green	Conrad Beard	156	5	
Majority		1,034		
Turnout		3,136	29	
Liberal Democrats hold		Swing		

=== May 2016 ===
2016
Party	Candidate	Votes	%	±%
Liberal Democrats	Christine Corris	1,539	45	
Labour	Amanda Green	692	20	
Conservative	Jamie Holt	618	18	
UKIP	Richard Ellis	504	15	
Green	Conrad Beard	103	3	
Majority		847		
Turnout		3,456		
Liberal Democrats hold		Swing		

=== May 2015 ===
2015
Party	Candidate	Votes	%	±%
Liberal Democrats	Stuart Corris	2,401	35	
Conservative	Sally Bennett	1,817	26	
Labour	Nav Mishra	1,341	19	
UKIP	Richard Ellis	1,078	16	
Green	Chris Eldridge	260	4	
Majority		584		
Turnout		6,897	64	
Liberal Democrats hold		Swing		

=== May 2014 ===
2014
Party	Candidate	Votes	%	±%
Liberal Democrats	Chris Gordon	1,349	36%	−5.19%
Labour	Roy Edward Driver	998	26%	−9.6%
UKIP	Richard Ellis	834	22%	N/A
Conservative	Sue Howard	498	13%	−1.49%
BNP	Andy Webster	89	2%	−6.71%
Majority		351	10%	+4.41%
Turnout		3768		
Liberal Democrats hold		Swing		

=== May 2012 ===
2012
Party	Candidate	Votes	%	±%
Liberal Democrats	Christine Corris	1,333	41.19	−19.76
Labour	Roy Driver	1,152	35.60	+26.08
Conservative	Chris Kelly	469	14.49	−15.04
BNP	Andy Webster	282	8.71	N/A
Majority		181	5.59	
Turnout		3,252	29.95	
Liberal Democrats hold		Swing		

=== May 2011 ===
2011
Party	Candidate	Votes	%	±%
Liberal Democrats	Michael Wilson	1,912	48.9	−10.0
Labour	Philip Bray	1,153	29.5	+14.5
Conservative	Rosalind Lloyd	844	21.6	−3.7
Majority		759		
Turnout		3,909	36.00	
Liberal Democrats hold		Swing		
