= Reddish North (ward) =

Greater Manchester

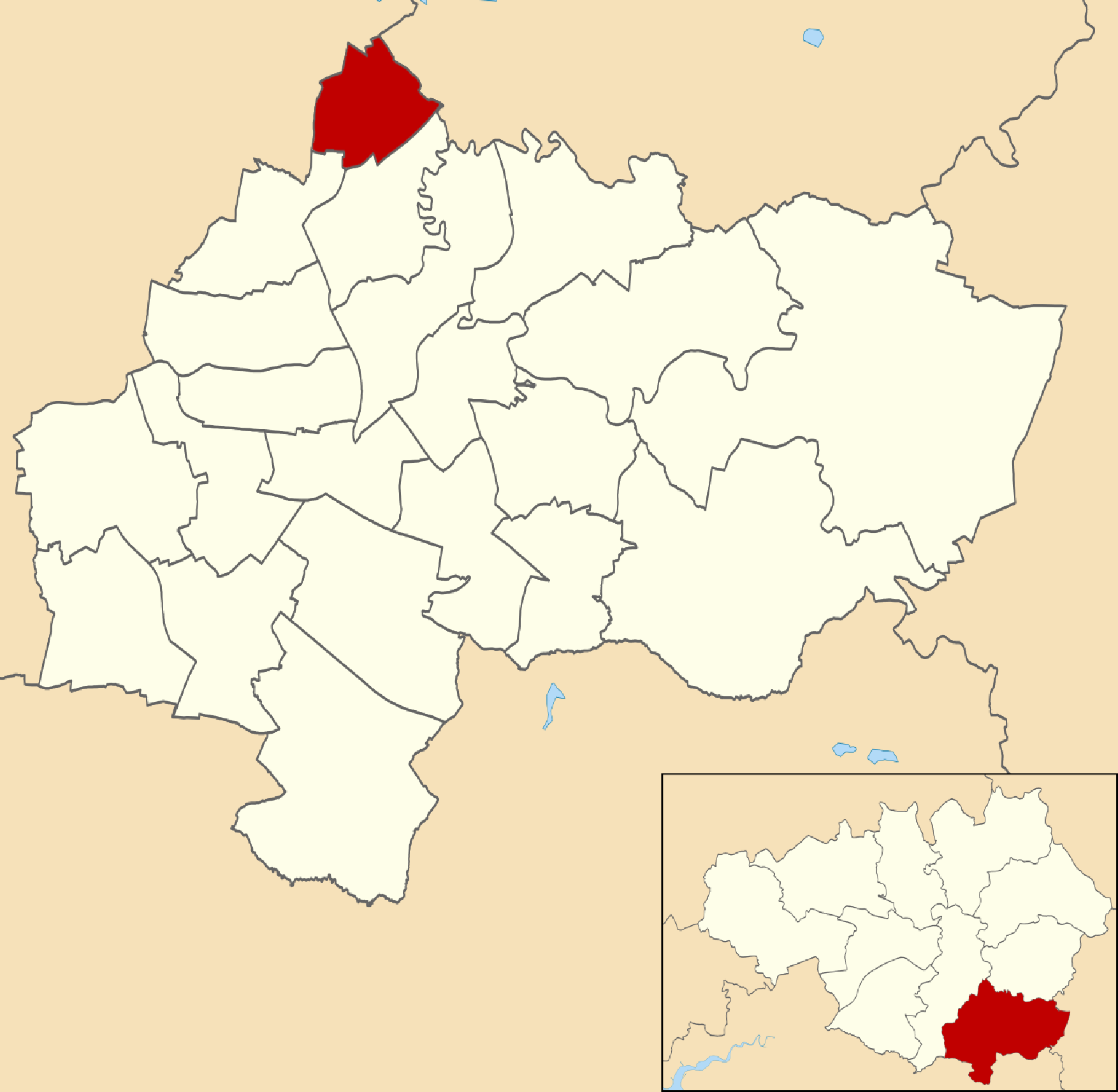
- Reddish North within Stockport
- Population: 10,711 (2010)
- Country: England
- Sovereign state: United Kingdom
- UK Parliament: Denton & Reddish
- Councillors: David Wilson (Labour); David White (Green); Rachel Wise (Labour)

Reddish North is an electoral ward in the Metropolitan Borough of Stockport. It elects three Councillors to Stockport Metropolitan Borough Council using the first past the post electoral method, electing one Councillor every year without election on the fourth.

It covers the northern part of Reddish and is Stockport's northernmost Council Ward. Together with Reddish South, it forms part of the Denton and Reddish Parliamentary Constituency.

== Councillors ==
Reddish North electoral ward is represented in Westminster by Andrew Gwynne MP for Denton and Reddish.

The ward is represented on Stockport Council by three councillors: David Wilson (Lab), Roy Driver (Lab), and Kate Butler (Lab).

Election	Councillor	Councillor	Councillor
2004	Peter Scott (Lab)	David Owen (Lab)	Anne Graham (Lab)
2006	Peter Scott (Lab)	David Owen (Lab)	Anne Graham (Lab)
2007	Peter Scott (Lab)	David Owen (Lab)	Anne Graham (Lab)
2008	Peter Scott (Lab)	David Owen (Lab)	Anne Graham (Lab)
By-election; 23 July 2009	Peter Scott (Lab)	David Wilson (Lab)	Anne Graham (Lab)
2010	Peter Scott (Lab)	David Wilson (Lab)	Anne Graham (Lab)
February 2011	Peter Scott (Lab)	David Wilson (Lab)	Anne Graham (Ind)
May 2011	David Wilson (Lab)	Paul Moss (Lab)	Anne Graham (Lib Dem)
2012	David Wilson (Lab)	Paul Moss (Lab)	Kate Butler (Lab)
May 2014	David Wilson (Lab)	Paul Moss (Lab)	Kate Butler (Lab)
October 2014	David Wilson (Lab)	Paul Moss (Ind)	Kate Butler (Lab)
May 2015	David Wilson (Lab)	Roy Driver (Lab)	Kate Butler (Lab)
2016	David Wilson (Lab)	Roy Driver (Lab)	Kate Butler (Lab)
2018	David Wilson (Lab)	Roy Driver (Lab)	Kate Butler (Lab)
2019	David Wilson (Lab)	Roy Driver (Lab)	Kate Butler (Lab)
2021	David Wilson (Lab)	Roy Driver (Lab)	Kate Butler (Lab)
2022	David Wilson (Lab)	Roy Driver (Lab)	Kate Butler (Lab)
2023	David Wilson (Lab)	Holly McCormack (Lab)	Rachel Wise (Lab)
2024	David Wilson (Lab)	Holly McCormack (Lab)	Rachel Wise (Lab)
April 2025	David Wilson (Lab)	Holly McCormack (Ind)	Rachel Wise (Lab)
2026	David Wilson (Lab)	David White (Grn)	Rachel Wise (Lab)

indicates seat up for re-election. indicates seat won in by-election. indicates councillor defected.

== Elections in the 2010s ==
=== May 2022 ===
2022
Party	Candidate	Votes	%	±%
Labour	David Wilson	1,881	69	
Conservative	Hamida Jaweed	362	13	
Green	Helena Julia Mellish	246	9	
Liberal Democrats	Geoffrey Alan Abell	128	5	
Women’s Equality Party	Paula Michelle King	101	4	
Majority		1,519		
Turnout		2,718	25	
Labour hold		Swing		

=== May 2021 ===
2021
Party	Candidate	Votes	%	±%
Labour	Kate Butler	2,029	61	
Conservative	Jacob Chacko	500	15	
Independent	Carl Evans	462	14	
Green	Helena Julia Mellish	252	8	
Liberal Democrats	Susan Ingham	92	3	
Majority		1,529		
Turnout		3,335	32	
Labour hold		Swing		

=== May 2019 ===
2019
Party	Candidate	Votes	%	±%
Labour	Roy Driver	1,403	58	
Green	Helena Julia Mellish	478	20	
Conservative	Natalie Fenton	349	14	
Liberal Democrats	Susan Ingham	192	8	
Majority		925		
Turnout		2,422	24	
Labour hold		Swing		

=== May 2018 ===
2018
Party	Candidate	Votes	%	±%
Labour	David Wilson	1,940	73	
Conservative	Beverley Oliver	424	16	
Green	Helena Mellish	187	7	
Liberal Democrats	Mark Jones	98	4	
Majority		1,516		
Turnout		2,649	25	
Labour hold		Swing		

=== May 2016 ===
2016
Party	Candidate	Votes	%	±%
Labour	Kate Butler	1,763	56	
UKIP	Josh Seddon	503	16	
Independent	Jeanette Doyle	412	13	
Conservative	Diane Fenton	277	9	
Green	Helena Mellish	95	3	
Liberal Democrats	Paul Ankers	92	3	
Majority		1,260		
Turnout		3,142	30	
Labour hold		Swing		

=== May 2015 ===
2015
Party	Candidate	Votes	%	±%
Labour	Roy Driver	3,335	54	
UKIP	Gary Bernard	1,120	18	
Conservative	Anthony Hannay	1,052	17	
Green	Joe Lucy	405	7	
Liberal Democrats	Denise Brewster	213	3	
Majority		2,215		
Turnout		6,125	57	
Labour hold		Swing		

=== May 2014 ===
2014
Party	Candidate	Votes	%	±%
Labour	David Stephen Wilson	2,082	66%	−3.39%
Conservative	Anthony Hannay	479	15%	+2.5%
BNP	Paul Bennett	419	13%	+1.74%
Liberal Democrats	Paul John Ankers	174	6%	−0.85%
Majority		1603	51%	−5.90%
Turnout		3154		
Labour hold		Swing		

=== May 2012 ===
2012
Party	Candidate	Votes	%	±%
Labour	Kate Butler	2,027	69.39	+20.86
Conservative	Julia Whelan	365	12.50	−12.80
BNP	Paul Bennett	329	11.26	−3.29
Liberal Democrats	Louise Shaw	200	6.85	−4.77
Majority		1,662	56.90	
Turnout		2,933	27.26	
Labour hold		Swing		

=== May 2011 ===
2011 (2)
Party	Candidate	Votes	%	±%
Labour	Paul Moss	2,421		
Labour	David Wilson	2,304		
Conservative	Anthony Hannay	645		
Conservative	Julie Whelan	569		
BNP	Paul Bennett	291		
Liberal Democrats	Pat Buttle	231		
Liberal Democrats	Robert Littlehales	183		
Majority		117		
Turnout		3,604	33.61	
Labour hold		Swing		
Labour hold		Swing		
