= Manor (Stockport ward) =

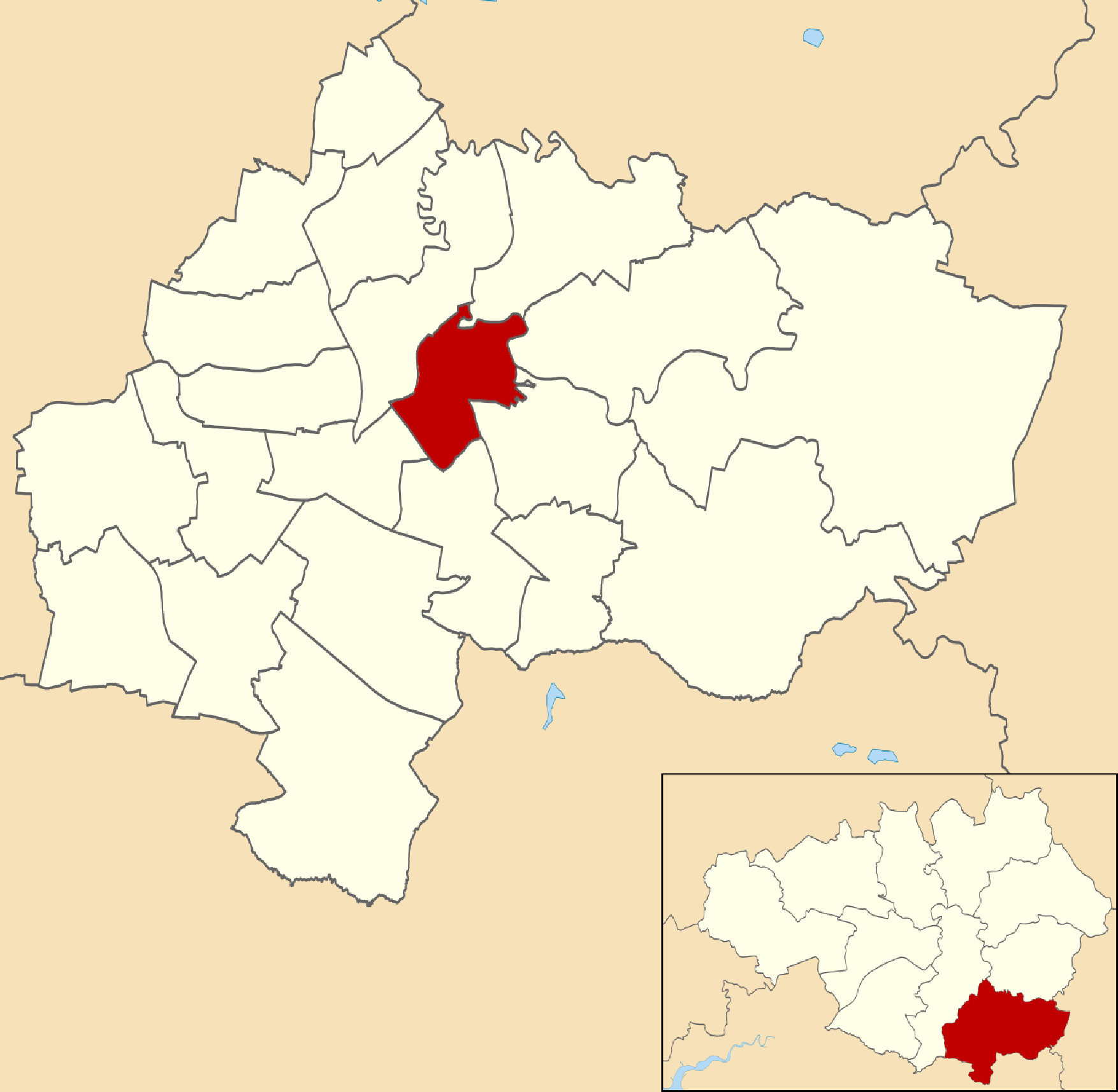
- Manor within Stockport
- Population: 10,537 (2010)
- Country: England
- Sovereign state: United Kingdom
- UK Parliament: Stockport
- Councillors: Sue Glithero (Labour); Laura Clingan (Labour); Charlie Stewart (Labour)

Manor is an electoral ward in the Metropolitan Borough of Stockport. It elects three councillors to Stockport Metropolitan Borough Council using the first past the post electoral method, electing one councillor every year without election on the fourth.

This was formerly a stronghold seat for the Liberal Democrats but the incumbent councillor, Sue Derbyshire, was defeated in 2016 to Charlie Stewart, of the Labour Party.

Since the Parliamentary Boundary changes ahead of the 2024 general election the ward has been part of the Hazel Grove Constituency. Prior to this, it was in the Stockport Parliamentary Constituency. Manor ward contains Aquinas College, as well as Banks Lane Infant and Junior Schools.

== Councillors ==
Manor electoral ward is represented in Westminster by Lisa Smart MP for Hazel Grove.

The ward is represented on Stockport Council by three councillors:

- Sue Glithero (Lab)
- Laura Clingan (Lab)
- Jon Byrne (Lab)

Election	Councillor	Councillor	Councillor
2004	David Robert-Jones (Lib Dem)	Jenny Humphreys (Lib Dem)	Sue Derbyshire (Lib Dem)
2006	Chris Blackburn (Lib Dem)	Jenny Humphreys (Lib Dem)	Sue Derbyshire (Lib Dem)
2007	Chris Blackburn (Lib Dem)	Jenny Humphreys (Lib Dem)	Sue Derbyshire (Lib Dem)
2008	Chris Blackburn (Lib Dem)	Jenny Humphreys (Lib Dem)	Sue Derbyshire (Lib Dem)
2010	Daniel Hawthorne (Lib Dem)	Jenny Humphreys (Lib Dem)	Sue Derbyshire (Lib Dem)
2011	Daniel Hawthorne (Lib Dem)	Patrick McAuley (Lab)	Sue Derbyshire (Lib Dem)
January 2012	Daniel Hawthorne (Lib Dem)	Patrick McAuley (Ind)	Sue Derbyshire (Lib Dem)
May 2012	Daniel Hawthorne (Lib Dem)	Patrick McAuley (Ind)	Sue Derbyshire (Lib Dem)
December 2012	Daniel Hawthorne (Lib Dem)	Patrick McAuley (Lib Dem)	Sue Derbyshire (Lib Dem)
2014	Daniel Hawthorne (Lib Dem)	Patrick McAuley (Lib Dem)	Sue Derbyshire (Lib Dem)
2015	Daniel Hawthorne (Lib Dem)	Patrick McAuley (Lib Dem)	Sue Derbyshire (Lib Dem)
April 2016	Daniel Hawthorne (Lib Dem)	Patrick McAuley (Ind)	Sue Derbyshire (Lib Dem)
May 2016	Daniel Hawthorne (Lib Dem)	Patrick McAuley (Ind)	Charlie Stewart (Lab)
2018	Amanda Peers (Lab)	Patrick McAuley (Ind)	Charlie Stewart (Lab)
2019	Amanda Peers (Lab)	Laura Clingan (Lab)	Charlie Stewart (Lab)
2021	Amanda Peers (Lab)	Laura Clingan (Lab)	Charlie Stewart (Lab)
2022	Sue Glithero (Lab)	Laura Clingan (Lab)	Charlie Stewart (Lab)
2023	Sue Glithero (Lab)	Laura Clingan (Lab)	Charlie Stewart (Lab)
2024	Sue Glithero (Lab)	Laura Clingan (Lab)	Jon Byrne (Lab)

indicates seat up for re-election. indicates councillor defected.

== Elections in the 2020s ==
=== May 2024 ===
Manor
Party	Candidate	Votes	%	±%
Labour	Jon Byrne	1,583	52.3	+13.2
Liberal Democrats	Jason Jones	779	25.7	−9.0
Reform	Stephen Speakman	281	9.3	+4.9
Conservative	Janice McGahan	195	6.4	−1.5
Green	Fiona Aviani-Bartram	188	6.2	−3.0
Majority		804	26.6	
Turnout		3,038	30.0	+0.8
Registered electors		10,086		
Labour hold		Swing		

=== May 2023 ===
Manor (3)
Party	Candidate	Votes	%
Labour	Laura Clingan	1,328	45.1
Labour	Sue Glithero	1,280	43.5
Labour	Charlie Stewart	1,152	39.1
Liberal Democrats	Micheala Meikle	1,103	37.5
Liberal Democrats	Jamie Hirst	1,047	35.6
Liberal Democrats	Jason Jones	1,021	34.7
Green	Antony Rablen	270	9.2
Conservative	Charlotte Tinné	233	7.9
Independent	Brian Battle	213	7.2
Independent	Chris Murphy	173	5.9
Independent	Andy Sorton	142	4.8
Reform	Stephen Speakman	130	4.4
Rejected ballots		9	
Turnout		2,945	29.2
Total votes		8,092	
Registered electors		10,071	
Labour win (new seat)			
Labour win (new seat)			
Labour win (new seat)			

=== May 2022 ===
Manor
Party	Candidate	Votes	%	±%
Labour	Sue Glithero	1,579	50.2	+3
Liberal Democrats	Mike Nash	1,011	32.1	−2
Conservative	Janice McGahan	366	11.6	−1
Green	Tony Rablen	169	5.4	−1
Majority		568	18.1	
Rejected ballots		21	0.7	
Turnout		3,146	29.9	−4
Registered electors		10,539		
Labour hold		Swing		

=== May 2021 ===
Manor
Party	Candidate	Votes	%	±%
Labour Co-op	Charlie Stewart*	1,674	47	+2
Liberal Democrats	Mike Nash	1,216	34	+7
Conservative	Karl Seppman	463	13	+2
Green	Anthony Rablen	217	6	−4
Majority		458		
Turnout		3,598	34	
Registered electors		10,536		
Labour Co-op hold		Swing		

== Elections in the 2010s ==
=== May 2019 ===
Patrick McAuley left the Lib Dems and became an independent councillor in 2016. He did not stand for re-election in 2019.

2019
Party	Candidate	Votes	%	±%
Labour	Laura Clingan	1,268	45	▼10
Liberal Democrats	Margaret McDermott	761	27	▲1
Conservative	Janice McGahan	301	11	▼2
Green	Anthony Ford Rablen	273	10	▲6
Foundation	John Howard Kelly	203	7	n/a
Majority		507	18	▼11
Turnout		2,806	27	▼1
Labour gain from Independent		Swing	5.5%	

=== May 2018 ===
2018
Party	Candidate	Votes	%	±%
Labour	Amanda Peers	1,630	55%	+11
Liberal Democrats	James Feetham	769	26%	−6
Conservative	Janice McGahan	398	13%	+7
Green	Cliff Lee	123	4%	+1
End Austerity	John Pearson	51	2%	+1
Majority		861	29%	+17%
Turnout		2,971	28%	−8%
Labour gain from Liberal Democrats		Swing	8.5%	

=== May 2016 ===
2016
Party	Candidate	Votes	%	±%
Labour	Charlie Stewart	1,624	44%	+11
Liberal Democrats	Sue Derbyshire	1,187	32%	−10
UKIP	John Kelly	508	14%	−6
Conservative	Janice McGahan	208	6%	+6
Green	Nancy Richardson	123	3%	−1
Independent	John Pearson	39	1%	n/a
Majority		437	12	+3
Turnout		3,689	36	−26
Labour gain from Liberal Democrats		Swing	10.5%	

=== May 2015 ===
Patrick McAuley left Labour and became a Lib Dem councillor in 2012.

2015
Party	Candidate	Votes	%	±%
Liberal Democrats	Patrick McAuley	2,757	42%	
Labour	Walter Barrett	2,146	33%	
UKIP	John Kelly	1,276	20%	
Green	Todd Hewitt	292	4%	
Left Unity	Ria Higham	47%	1%	
Majority		611		
Turnout		6,518	62	
Liberal Democrats gain from Labour		Swing		

=== May 2014 ===
2014
Party	Candidate	Votes	%	±%
Liberal Democrats	Daniel Hawthorne	1,458	40%	−4.32%
Labour	Walter Barrett	1233	34%	−9.44%
UKIP	John Howard Kelly	660	18%	N/A
Conservative	Beverley Oliver	203	6%	+1.36%
BNP	Duncan Noel Warner	67	2%	−2.76%
Majority		225	6%	+5.25%
Turnout		3621	34%	
Liberal Democrats hold		Swing		

=== May 2012 ===
2012
Party	Candidate	Votes	%	±%
Liberal Democrats	Sue Derbyshire	1,415	44.32	−1.07
Labour	Walter Barrett	1,391	43.56	+20.19
Conservative	Leslie Judson	235	7.36	−10.07
BNP	Duncan Warner	152	4.76	−9.06
Majority		24	0.75	
Turnout		3,211	30.52	
Liberal Democrats hold		Swing		

=== May 2011 ===
2011
Party	Candidate	Votes	%	±%
Labour	Patrick McAuley	1,603		
Liberal Democrats	Jenny Humphreys	1,314		
Conservative	Leslie Judson	526		
BNP	Duncan Warner	204		
Majority		289		
Turnout		3,665	34.66	
Labour gain from Liberal Democrats		Swing		
