= Heatons North =

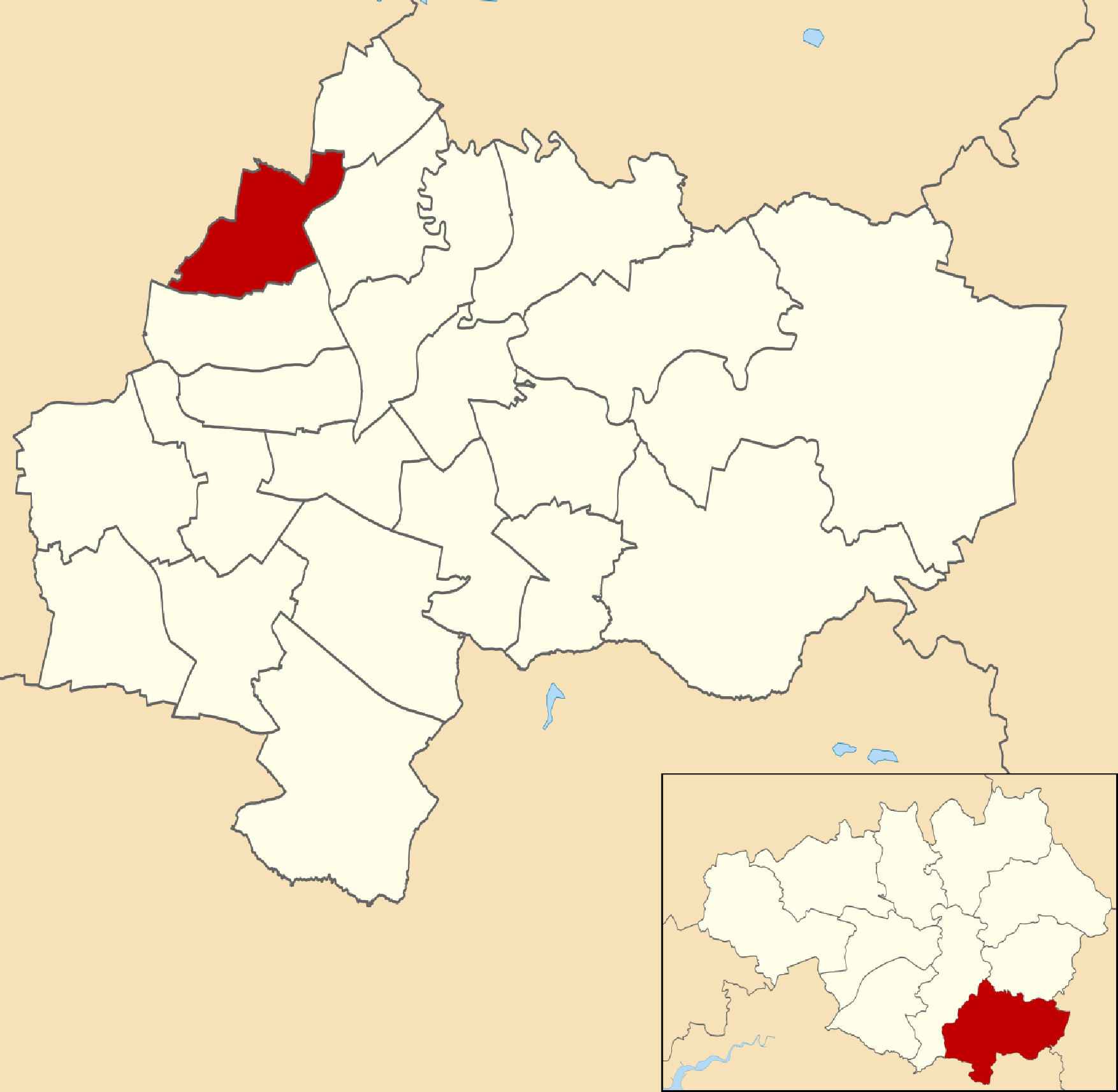
- Heatons North within Stockport
- Population: 10,506 (2010)
- Country: England
- Sovereign state: United Kingdom
- UK Parliament: Stockport
- Councillors: John Taylor (Labour); Dena Ryness (Labour); David Sedgwick (Labour)

Heatons North is an electoral ward in the Metropolitan Borough of Stockport, Greater Manchester, England. It elects three Councillors to Stockport Metropolitan Borough Council using the first past the post electoral method, electing one Councillor every year without election on the fourth.

Together with Brinnington & Central, Davenport and Cale Green, Edgeley and Cheadle Heath, Heatons South and Manor, the ward lies in the Stockport Parliamentary Constituency. The ward contains Heaton Chapel Station as well as Priestnall School. Stockport Council closed the leisure centre at Peel Moat in 2012, which stood in Heatons North.

== Councillors ==
Heatons North electoral ward is represented in Westminster by Navendu Mishra MP for Stockport.

The ward is represented on Stockport Council by three councillors:

- John Taylor (Lab)
- Dena Ryness (Lab)
- David Sedgwick (Lab)

Election	Councillor	Councillor	Councillor
2004	Anthony O'Neill (Con)	Jackie Jones (Con)	Les Jones (Con)
2006	Anthony O'Neill (Con)	Jackie Jones (Con)	Les Jones (Con)
2007	Anthony O'Neill (Con)	Jackie Jones (Con)	Les Jones (Con)
2008	Anthony O'Neill (Con)	Jackie Jones (Con)	Les Jones (Con)
2010	Anthony O'Neill (Con)	Jackie Jones (Con)	Les Jones (Con)
2011	Anthony O'Neill (Con)	Alex Ganotis (Lab)	Les Jones (Con)
2012	Anthony O'Neill (Con)	Alex Ganotis (Lab)	David Sedgwick (Lab)
2014	John Taylor (Lab)	Alex Ganotis (Lab)	David Sedgwick (Lab)
2015	John Taylor (Lab)	Alex Ganotis (Lab)	David Sedgwick (Lab)
2016	John Taylor (Lab)	Alex Ganotis (Lab)	David Sedgwick (Lab)
2018	John Taylor (Lab)	Alex Ganotis (Lab)	David Sedgwick (Lab)
2019	John Taylor (Lab)	Dena Ryness (Lab)	David Sedgwick (Lab)
2021	John Taylor (Lab)	Dena Ryness (Lab)	David Sedgwick (Lab)
2022	John Taylor (Lab)	Dena Ryness (Lab)	David Sedgwick (Lab)

indicates seat up for re-election.

== Elections in the 2020s ==
An asterisk (*) indicates incumbent councillor seeking re-election.

=== May 2022 ===
2022
Party	Candidate	Votes	%	±%
Labour	John Taylor*	2,532	61	
Conservative	Jason Davis-D'Cruz	763	19	
Green	Sam Dugdale	469	11	
Liberal Democrats	Jenny Humphreys	250	6	
Women's Equality	Dianne Coffey	108	3	
Majority		1,769		
Turnout		4,122	38	
Labour hold		Swing		

=== May 2021 ===
2021
Party	Candidate	Votes	%	±%
Labour	David Sedgwick*	3,358	66	
Conservative	Hassan Sajjad	928	18	
Green	Sam Dugdale	416	8	
Liberal Democrats	Jenny Humphreys	280	6	
Women's Equality	Paula King	103	2	
Majority		2,430		
Turnout		5,085	46	
Labour hold		Swing		

== Elections in the 2010s ==
=== May 2019 ===
2019
Party	Candidate	Votes	%	±%
Labour	Dena Ryness*	1,955	50	
Conservative	Anne-Marie Wadsworth	727	19	
Green	Janet Cuff	616	16	
Liberal Democrats	Jenny Humphreys	429	11	
Women's Equality	Jen Bryan	188	5	
Majority		1,228		
Turnout		3,915	36	
Labour hold		Swing		

=== May 2018 ===
2018
Party	Candidate	Votes	%	±%
Labour	John Taylor*	2,436	61	
Conservative	Pamela Haworth	909	23	
Green	Janet Cuff	238	6	
Liberal Democrats	Jenny Humphreys	222	6	
Women's Equality	Diane Coffey	212	5	
Majority		1,527		
Turnout		4,017	37	
Labour hold		Swing		

=== May 2016 ===
2016
Party	Candidate	Votes	%	±%
Labour	David Sedgwick*	2,602	61	
Conservative	Pamela Haworth	1,051	25	
Green	Janet Cuff	377	9	
Liberal Democrats	Jenny Humphreys	231	5	
Majority		1,551		
Turnout		4,261	41	
Labour hold		Swing		

=== May 2015 ===
2015
Party	Candidate	Votes	%	±%
Labour	Alex Ganotis*	3,539	46	
Conservative	Natalie Fenton	2,285	30	
Green	Janet Cuff	680	9	
UKIP	Gail Lewis	578	8	
Liberal Democrats	Jenny Humphreys	478	6	
TUSC	Dan Boyle	66	1	
Majority		1,254		
Turnout		7,626	71	
Labour hold		Swing		

=== May 2014 ===
2014
Party	Candidate	Votes	%	±%
Labour	John Taylor	2,105	52%	+4.10%
Conservative	Rosalind Elaine Lloyd	1168	29%	−9.88%
Green	Janet Cuff	526	13%	+
Liberal Democrats	Jenny Humphreys	266	7%	+3.89%
Majority		937	23%	+13.99%
Turnout		4065		
Labour gain from Conservative		Swing		

=== May 2012 ===
2012
Party	Candidate	Votes	%	±%
Labour	David Sedgwick	1,913	47.90	+22.34
Conservative	Barbara Judson	1,553	38.88	−13.99
Green	Janet Cuff	364	9.11	+0.53
Liberal Democrats	Andrew Rawling	164	4.11	−5.04
Majority		360	9.01	
Turnout		4,008	38.13	
Labour gain from Conservative		Swing		

=== May 2011 ===
2011
Party	Candidate	Votes	%	±%
Labour	Alex Ganotis	2,120	45.1	
Conservative	Jackie Jones*	1,758	37.4	
Liberal Democrats	Andrew Rawling	396	8.4	
Green	Peter Barber	392	8.3	
Majority		362		
Turnout		4,704	44.55	
Labour gain from Conservative		Swing		
