= 2010 Stockport Metropolitan Borough Council election =

2010 UK local government election

Map showing the results of the 2010 Stockport Metropolitan Borough Council elections by ward.

Elections to Stockport Metropolitan Borough Council were held on 6 May 2010 when one third of the seats were up for election. The Liberal Democrats retained the majority that they had held continuously since 2002.

The state of the parties after the election was:

| Party | Seats | +/- | % votes |
|---|---|---|---|
| Liberal Democrat | 37 | 0 | 40.8 |
| Labour | 13 | +1 | 22.1 |
| Conservative | 8 | -1 | 30.3 |
| Heald Green Ratepayer | 3 | 0 | |
| Independent | 2 | 0 | 0 |

== Ward results ==
=== Bramhall North ===
Bramhall North
| Party | Candidate | Votes | % | ±% |
|---|---|---|---|---|
| Conservative | Lisa Walker | 3,764 | 47.8 | −8.5 |
| Liberal Democrats | Pauline Banham | 3,763 | 47.8 | +10.5 |
| Labour | Brian Harrop | 521 | 6.5 | +2.9 |
| Majority | | 1 | 0.0001 | −19 |
| Turnout | | 7898 | 73.9 | |
| Conservative gain from Independent | | Swing | | |

=== Bramhall South ===
Bramhall South
| Party | Candidate | Votes | % | ±% |
|---|---|---|---|---|
| Conservative | Bryan Leck | 3,775 | 48.6 | |
| Liberal Democrats | Paul Carter | 3,195 | 41.1 | |
| Labour | Beryl Dykes | 387 | 5.0 | |
| UKIP | David Perry | 213 | 2.7 | |
| Green | Ross White | 173 | 2.2 | |
| Majority | | 580 | 7.5 | |
| Turnout | | 7,771 | 78.5 | |
| Conservative hold | | Swing | | |

=== Bredbury and Woodley ===
Bredbury and Woodley
| Party | Candidate | Votes | % | ±% |
|---|---|---|---|---|
| Liberal Democrats | Chris Gordon | 4,009 | 58.9 | |
| Conservative | Rosalind Lloyd | 1,723 | 25.3 | |
| Labour | Clifford Stanway | 1,025 | 15.0 | |
| Majority | | 2,286 | 33.6 | |
| Turnout | | 6,811 | 62.2 | |
| Liberal Democrats hold | | Swing | | |

=== Bredbury Green and Romiley ===
Bredbury Green and Romiley
| Party | Candidate | Votes | % | ±% |
|---|---|---|---|---|
| Liberal Democrats | Mags Kirkham | 3,123 | 44.1 | |
| Conservative | Syd Lloyd | 2,979 | 42.1 | |
| Labour | David Sedgwick | 945 | 13.4 | |
| Majority | | 144 | 2.0 | |
| Turnout | | 7,078 | 64.8 | |
| Liberal Democrats gain from Conservative | | Swing | | |

=== Brinnington and Central ===
Brinnington and Central
| Party | Candidate | Votes | % | ±% |
|---|---|---|---|---|
| Labour | Maureen Rowles | 2,413 | 48.2 | |
| Liberal Democrats | Colin MacAlister | 1,394 | 27.8 | |
| Conservative | Steve Holgate | 508 | 10.1 | |
| BNP | Tony Dean | 315 | 6.3 | |
| UKIP | John Heginbotham | 241 | 4.8 | |
| Green | Chris Green | 125 | 2.5 | |
| Majority | | 1,019 | 20.4 | |
| Turnout | | 5,010 | 50.2 | |
| Labour gain from Liberal Democrats | | Swing | | |

=== Cheadle and Gatley ===
Cheadle and Gatley
| Party | Candidate | Votes | % | ±% |
|---|---|---|---|---|
| Liberal Democrats | Iain Roberts | 4,332 | 53.0 | |
| Conservative | Adam Calmonson | 2,964 | 36.3 | |
| Labour | Colin Owen | 848 | 10.4 | |
| Majority | | 1,368 | 13.7 | |
| Turnout | | 8,168 | 71.6 | |
| Liberal Democrats hold | | Swing | | |

=== Cheadle Hulme North ===
Cheadle Hulme North
| Party | Candidate | Votes | % | ±% |
|---|---|---|---|---|
| Liberal Democrats | June Somekh | 3,939 | 57.1 | |
| Conservative | Benjamin Ash | 1,995 | 28.9 | |
| Labour | Martin Miller | 930 | 13.5 | |
| Majority | | 1,944 | 28.2 | |
| Turnout | | 6,901 | 68.2 | |
| Liberal Democrats hold | | Swing | | |

=== Cheadle Hulme South ===
Cheadle Hulme South
| Party | Candidate | Votes | % | ±% |
|---|---|---|---|---|
| Liberal Democrats | Stuart Bodsworth | 4,110 | 54.2 | |
| Conservative | Brian Dougal | 2,797 | 36.9 | |
| Labour | Dean Fitzpatrick | 635 | 8.4 | |
| Majority | | 1,313 | 17.3 | |
| Turnout | | 7,577 | 72.3 | |
| Liberal Democrats hold | | Swing | | |

=== Davenport and Cale Green ===
Davenport and Cale Green
| Party | Candidate | Votes | % | ±% |
|---|---|---|---|---|
| Liberal Democrats | David White | 2,453 | 39.2 | |
| Labour | Brian Hendley | 2,032 | 32.5 | |
| Conservative | Beryl Charlesworth | 1,321 | 21.1 | |
| Green | Phil Shaw | 415 | 6.6 | |
| Majority | | 421 | 6.7 | |
| Turnout | | 6,255 | 57.2 | |
| Liberal Democrats hold | | Swing | | |

=== Edgeley and Cheadle Heath ===
Edgeley and Cheadle Heath
| Party | Candidate | Votes | % | ±% |
|---|---|---|---|---|
| Labour | Philip Harding | 3,137 | 48.5 | |
| Liberal Democrats | Peter Weigert | 1,532 | 23.7 | |
| Conservative | Chris Holgate | 1,177 | 18.2 | |
| BNP | Damian Skuse | 258 | 4.0 | |
| Green | Andrew Knighton | 221 | 3.4 | |
| Independent | Peter Behan | 111 | 1.7 | |
| Majority | | 1,605 | 24.8 | |
| Turnout | | 6,463 | 60.6 | |
| Labour hold | | Swing | | |

=== Hazel Grove ===
Hazel Grove
| Party | Candidate | Votes | % | ±% |
|---|---|---|---|---|
| Liberal Democrats | Stuart Corris | 3,777 | 51.0 | |
| Conservative | William Wragg | 2,697 | 36.4 | |
| Labour | Karen Vickers | 884 | 11.9 | |
| Majority | | 1,080 | 14.6 | |
| Turnout | | 7,402 | 67.0 | |
| Liberal Democrats hold | | Swing | | |

=== Heald Green ===
Heald Green
| Party | Candidate | Votes | % | ±% |
|---|---|---|---|---|
| Independent | Adrian Nottingham | 3,462 | 50.0 | |
| Liberal Democrats | David Roberts-Jones | 1,469 | 21.2 | |
| Conservative | Robert Stevenson | 952 | 13.8 | |
| Labour | Kathryn Priestley | 680 | 9.8 | |
| BNP | Richard Skill | 328 | 4.7 | |
| Majority | | 1,993 | 28.8 | |
| Turnout | | 6,917 | 69.0 | |
| Independent hold | | Swing | | |

=== Heatons North ===
Heatons North
| Party | Candidate | Votes | % | ±% |
|---|---|---|---|---|
| Conservative | Anthony O'Neill | 2,680 | 36.6 | |
| Labour | Alex Ganotis | 2,396 | 32.7 | |
| Liberal Democrats | Andrew Rawling | 1,596 | 21.8 | |
| Green | Peter Barber | 419 | 5.7 | |
| BNP | Sheila Spink | 205 | 2.8 | |
| Majority | | 284 | 3.9 | |
| Turnout | | 7,322 | 69.7 | |
| Conservative hold | | Swing | | |

=== Heatons South ===
Heatons South
| Party | Candidate | Votes | % | ±% |
|---|---|---|---|---|
| Labour | Tom McGee | 3,401 | 44.0 | |
| Conservative | Bryan Lees | 2,286 | 29.6 | |
| Liberal Democrats | Ron Axtell | 1,697 | 21.9 | |
| Green | Conrad Beard | 322 | 4.2 | |
| Majority | | 1,115 | 14.4 | |
| Turnout | | 7,735 | 70.9 | |
| Labour hold | | Swing | | |

=== Manor ===
Manor
| Party | Candidate | Votes | % | ±% |
|---|---|---|---|---|
| Liberal Democrats | Daniel Hawthorne | 2,605 | 40.8 | |
| Labour | Paul Moss | 2,030 | 31.8 | |
| Conservative | Alex Raisbeck | 1,269 | 19.9 | |
| BNP | Duncan Warner | 464 | 7.3 | |
| Majority | | 575 | 9.0 | |
| Turnout | | 6,392 | 60.7 | |
| Liberal Democrats hold | | Swing | | |

=== Marple North ===
Marple North
| Party | Candidate | Votes | % | ±% |
|---|---|---|---|---|
| Liberal Democrats | Craig Wright | 3,435 | 47.9 | |
| Conservative | Catherine Walsh | 2,389 | 33.3 | |
| Labour | David Rowbottom | 647 | 9.0 | |
| Green | Maggie Preston | 442 | 6.2 | |
| Independent | Barry Minshall | 233 | 3.2 | |
| Majority | | 1,046 | 14.6 | |
| Turnout | | 7,172 | 72.4 | |
| Liberal Democrats hold | | Swing | | |

=== Marple South ===
Marple South
| Party | Candidate | Votes | % | ±% |
|---|---|---|---|---|
| Liberal Democrats | Susan Ingham | 3,717 | 54.8 | |
| Conservative | Oliver Johnstone | 2,421 | 35.7 | |
| Labour | Patrick McAuley | 612 | 9.0 | |
| Majority | | 1,296 | 19.1 | |
| Turnout | | 6,784 | 69.7 | |
| Liberal Democrats hold | | Swing | | |

=== Offerton ===
Offerton
| Party | Candidate | Votes | % | ±% |
|---|---|---|---|---|
| Liberal Democrats | John Smith | 3,173 | 48.7 | |
| Conservative | Julie Wragg | 1,536 | 23.6 | |
| Labour | Laura Booth | 1,199 | 18.4 | |
| BNP | Stephen Maher | 573 | 8.8 | |
| Majority | | 1,637 | 25.1 | |
| Turnout | | 6,512 | 61.9 | |
| Liberal Democrats hold | | Swing | | |

=== Reddish North ===
Reddish North
| Party | Candidate | Votes | % | ±% |
|---|---|---|---|---|
| Labour | Peter Scott | 3,209 | 53.5 | |
| Liberal Democrats | Daniel Langley | 1,115 | 18.6 | |
| Conservative | Anthony Hannay | 1,100 | 18.3 | |
| BNP | Paul Bennett | 536 | 8.9 | |
| Majority | | 2,094 | 34.9 | |
| Turnout | | 5,996 | 56.0 | |
| Labour hold | | Swing | | |

=== Reddish South ===
Reddish South
| Party | Candidate | Votes | % | ±% |
|---|---|---|---|---|
| Labour | Tom Grundy | 3,196 | 50.7 | |
| Liberal Democrats | Norman Beverley | 1,433 | 22.7 | |
| Conservative | Stephen Burt | 1,320 | 20.9 | |
| BNP | George Thorne | 326 | 5.2 | |
| Majority | | 1,763 | 28.0 | |
| Turnout | | 6,302 | 61.0 | |
| Labour hold | | Swing | | |

=== Stepping Hill ===
Stepping Hill
| Party | Candidate | Votes | % | ±% |
|---|---|---|---|---|
| Liberal Democrats | Mark Weldon | 3,305 | 46.9 | |
| Conservative | John Wright | 2,296 | 32.6 | |
| Labour | Janet Rothwell | 954 | 13.5 | |
| BNP | Alan Carney | 264 | 3.7 | |
| Green | Ken Pease | 208 | 3.0 | |
| Majority | | 1,009 | 14.3 | |
| Turnout | | 7,041 | 71.6 | |
| Liberal Democrats hold | | Swing | | |

== Changes 2010–2011 ==
Labour councillor Anne Graham joined the Liberal Democrat group in February 2011, bringing them to 36 Councillors out of 63.

On 2 February 2011, Councillors David White, Roy Driver and Anne Graham all resigned from the Liberal Democrat Group. All three cited unhappiness with the national party's involvement with a "Tory-led" government. They formed an Independent Left Group on the Council, whilst awaiting the result of membership applications to the Labour Party, and subsequently joined the Labour Group after the 2011 elections. Driver was not selected for a seat in the May 2011 elections, but unsuccessfully contested Bredbury and Woodley for Labour in May 2012. He was eventually elected as councillor for Reddish North in 2015.
