= Heatons South =

Greater Manchester

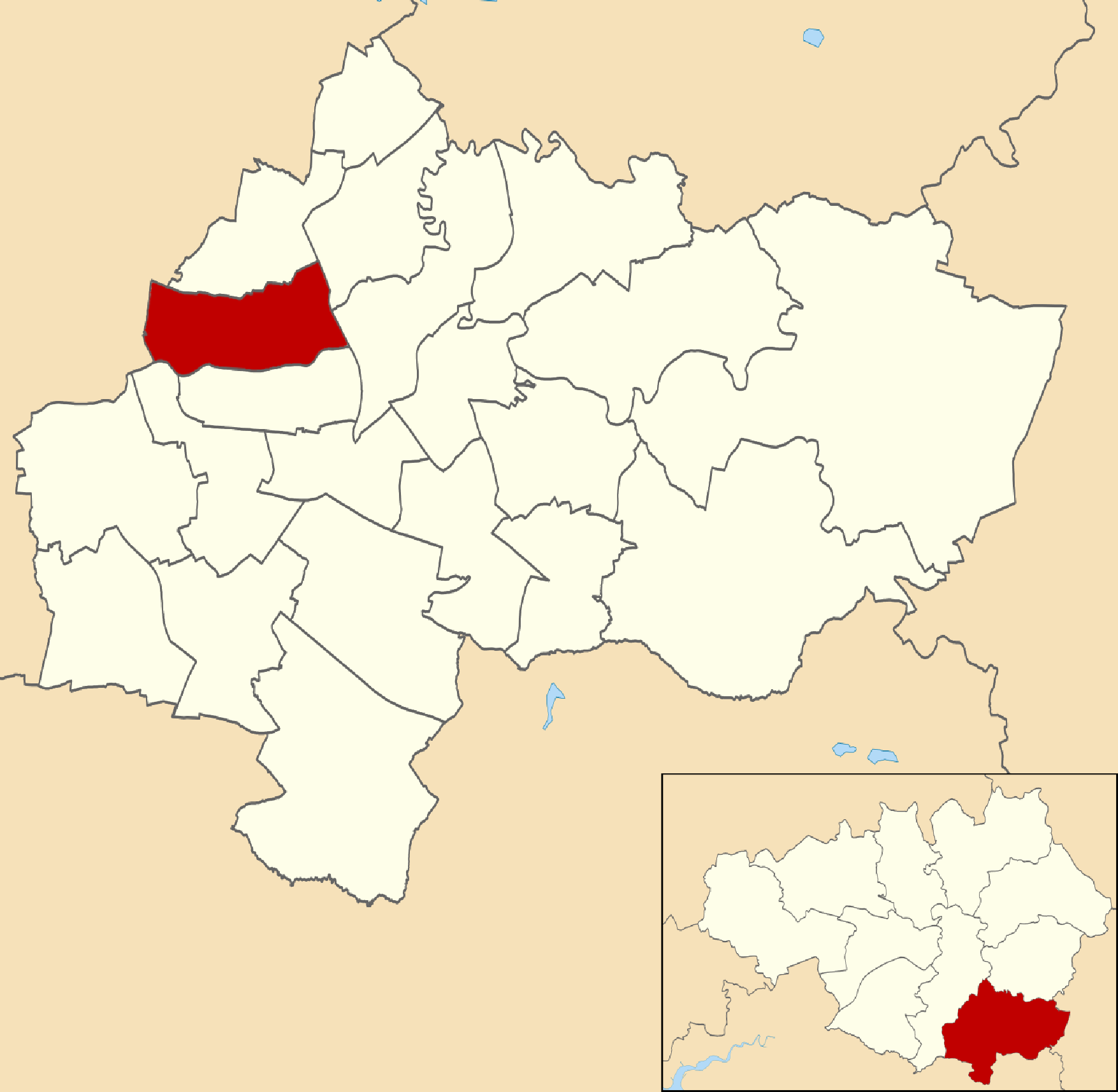
- Heatons South within Stockport
- Country: England
- Sovereign state: United Kingdom
- UK Parliament: Stockport
- Councillors: Tom McGee (Labour); Dean Fitzpatrick (Labour); Colin Foster (Labour)

Heatons South is an electoral ward in the Metropolitan Borough of Stockport. It elects three Councillors to Stockport Metropolitan Borough Council using the first past the post electoral method, electing one Councillor every year without election on the fourth.

The ward covers the southern part of the Heatons bounded by the Manchester border, River Mersey and A6 including Heaton Mersey, Norris Bank, parts of Heaton Norris and Heaton Moor. The southern part of the ward contain part of the M60 Motorway. Together with Brinnington & Central, Davenport and Cale Green, Edgeley and Cheadle Heath, Heatons North and Manor, the ward lies in the Stockport Parliamentary Constituency.

== Councillors ==
Heatons South electoral ward is represented in Westminster by Navendu Mishra MP for Stockport.

The ward is represented on Stockport Council by three councillors:Tom McGee (Lab), Dean Fitzpatrick (Lab), and Colin Foster (Lab)

Election	Councillor	Councillor	Councillor
2004	David Foulkes (Con)	Lesley Auger (Lab)	Colin Foster (Lab)
2006	Tom McGee (Lab)	Owen Breen(Lab)	Colin Foster (Lab)
2007	Tom McGee (Lab)	Owen Breen (Lab)	Colin Foster (Lab)
2008	Tom McGee (Lab)	Owen Breen (Lab)	Colin Foster (Lab)
2010	Tom McGee (Lab)	Owen Breen (Lab)	Colin Foster (Lab)
2011	Tom McGee (Lab)	Dean Fitzpatrick (Lab)	Colin Foster (Lab)
2012	Tom McGee (Lab)	Dean Fitzpatrick (Lab)	Colin Foster (Lab)
2014	Tom McGee (Lab)	Dean Fitzpatrick (Lab)	Colin Foster (Lab)
2015	Tom McGee (Lab)	Dean Fitzpatrick (Lab)	Colin Foster (Lab)
2016	Tom McGee (Lab)	Dean Fitzpatrick (Lab)	Colin Foster (Lab)
2018	Tom McGee (Lab)	Dean Fitzpatrick (Lab)	Colin Foster (Lab)
2019	Tom McGee (Lab)	Dean Fitzpatrick (Lab)	Colin Foster (Lab)
2021	Tom McGee (Lab)	Dean Fitzpatrick (Lab)	Colin Foster (Lab)
2022	Tom McGee (Lab)	Dean Fitzpatrick (Lab)	Colin Foster (Lab)

indicates seat up for re-election.

== Elections in the 2010s ==
=== May 2019 ===
2019
Party	Candidate	Votes	%	±%
Labour	Dean Fitzpatrick	2,270	59	
Conservative	Beverley Marlene Oliver	633	16	
Green	Samuel William Dugdale	620	16	
Liberal Democrats	Charles Alexander Gibson	349	9	
Majority		1,637		
Turnout		3,872	36	
Labour hold		Swing		

=== May 2018 ===
2018
Party	Candidate	Votes	%	±%
Labour	Tom McGee	2,706	66	
Conservative	Paula Timperley	859	21	
Green	Samuel Dugdale	269	7	
Liberal Democrats	Charles Gibson	236	6	
Majority		1,847		
Turnout		4,070	37	
Labour hold		Swing		

=== May 2016 ===
2016
Party	Candidate	Votes	%	±%
Labour	Colin Foster	2,962	68	
Conservative	Robert Stevenson	805	19	
Liberal Democrats	James Feetham	305	7	
Green	Samuel Dugdale	279	6	
Majority		2,157		
Turnout		4,351	40	
Labour hold		Swing		

=== May 2015 ===
2015
Party	Candidate	Votes	%	±%
Labour	Dean Fitzpatrick	3,990	51	
Conservative	Alexander Fenton	2,014	26	
UKIP	Janine Kershaw	690	9	
Green	Sam Dugdale	652	8	
Liberal Democrats	Stephen Howarth	530	7	
Majority		1,976		
Turnout		7,876	71	
Labour hold		Swing		

=== May 2014 ===
2014
Party	Candidate	Votes	%	±%
Labour	Tom McGee	2,459	58	−9.85
Conservative	Natalie Louise Fenton	980	23	+1.21
Green	Conrad Clive Beard	410	10	N/A
Liberal Democrats	Denise Brewster	247	6	−0.87
BNP	Sheila Mary Spink	165	4	+0.51
Majority		1479	35	−11.06
Turnout		4261	39	
Labour hold		Swing		

=== May 2012 ===
2012
Party	Candidate	Votes	%	±%
Labour	Colin Foster	2,706	67.85	+22.55
Conservative	Bryan Lees	869	21.79	−15.24
Liberal Democrats	Ronald Axtell	274	6.87	−3.42
BNP	Sheila Spink	139	3.49	N/A
Majority		1,837	46.06	
Turnout		4,002	36.58	
Labour hold		Swing		

=== May 2011 ===
2011
Party	Candidate	Votes	%	±%
Labour	Dean Fitzpatrick	2,568	52.8	
Conservative	Barbara Judson	1,507	31.0	
Liberal Democrats	Ron Axtell	442	9.1	
Green	Conrad Beard	324	6.7	
Majority		1,061		
Turnout		4,866	44.51	
Labour hold		Swing		
