= 2015 Stockport Metropolitan Borough Council election =

2015 local election in England

Stockport Metropolitan Council Election 2015
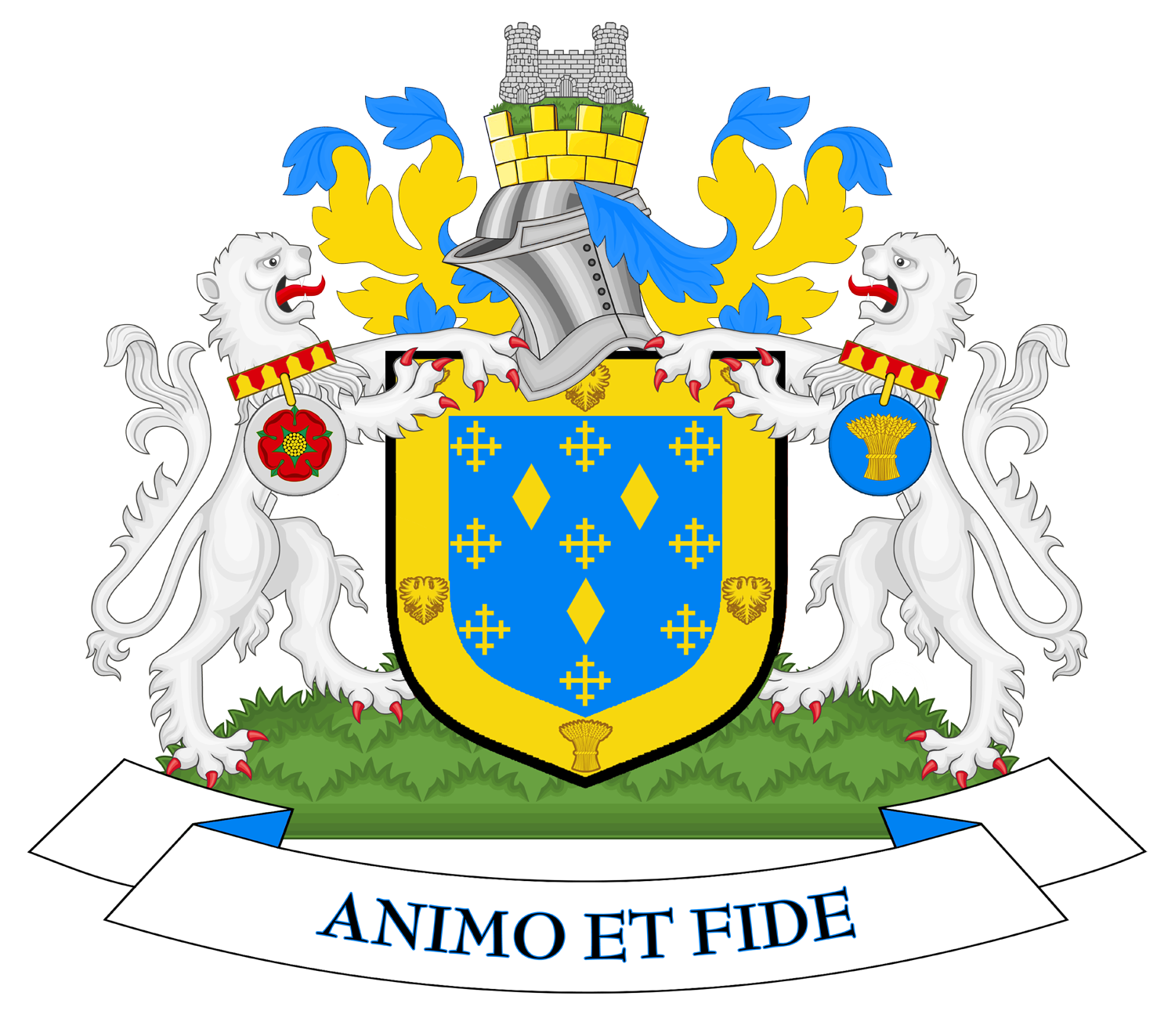
← 2014	7 May 2015	2016 →

21 Seats up for Election
	First party	Second party
Party	Liberal Democrats	Labour
Seats before	28	22
Seats won	6	7
Seats after	26	21
Seat change	▼2	▼1
	Third party	Fourth party
Party	Conservative	Heald Green Ratepayers
Seats before	10	3
Seats won	7	1
Seats after	13	3
Seat change	▲3	Steady
- Map showing the results of the 2015 Stockport Metropolitan Borough Council elections by ward. Red shows Labour seats, blue shows the Conservatives, yellow shows the Liberal Democrats and green the Heald Green Ratepayers.
Leader of the Council before election
Liberal Democrats
Leader of the Council
Liberal Democrats

Stockport Metropolitan Borough Council 2015 results

Structure
- Political groups: Administration post-election Liberal Democrats (26) Other parties Labour (21) Conservative (13) Heald Green Ratepayers (3)

The 2015 Stockport Metropolitan Borough Council election took place on 7 May 2015 to elect members of Stockport Metropolitan Borough Council in England. This was on the same day as other local elections and the UK General Election. Stockport Council is elected in thirds which means that in each three member local ward, one councillor is elected every year, except every four years which is classed as fallow year. The last fallow year was 2013, when no local government elections took place in the borough. Those councillors elected will serve a four-year term expiring in 2019.

Following the elections, the Lib Dem minority administration was able to continue in office.

== Election results by ward ==
Asterisk (*) indicates incumbent in the Ward, and Bold names highlight winning candidate.

=== Bramhall North ===
Bramhall North
Party	Candidate	Votes	%	±%
Conservative	Alanna Vine*	3,920	49	
Liberal Democrats	Helen Foster-Grime	2,551	32	
Labour	Elizabeth Marron	754	9	
UKIP	David Perry	515	6	
Green	Deborah Hind	338	4	
Majority		1,369		
Turnout		8,078	75	
Conservative hold		Swing		

=== Bramhall South & Woodford ===
Paul Bellis was previously the Conservative Party councillor for Bramhall South & Woodford.

Bramhall South & Woodford
Party	Candidate	Votes	%	±%
Conservative	Mike Hurleston	3,598	46	
Liberal Democrats	Jeremy Meal	2,579	33	
UKIP	Paul Bellis*	779	10	
Labour	Beryl Dykes	572	7	
Green	Nicole Spring	281	4	
Majority		1,019		
Turnout		7,809	79	
Conservative gain from UKIP		Swing		

=== Bredbury & Woodley ===
Bredbury & Woodley
Party	Candidate	Votes	%	±%
Liberal Democrats	Stuart Corris	2,401	35	
Conservative	Sally Bennett	1,817	26	
Labour	Nav Mishra	1,341	19	
UKIP	Richard Ellis	1,078	16	
Green	Chris Eldridge	260	4	
Majority		584		
Turnout		6,897	64	
Liberal Democrats hold		Swing		

=== Bredbury Green & Romiley ===
Bredbury Green & Romiley
Party	Candidate	Votes	%	±%
Conservative	Syd Lloyd*	2,481	34	
Liberal Democrats	Natalie Bird	2,067	29	
Labour	Phillip Bray	1,391	19	
UKIP	Brian Stanyer	1,066	15	
Green	Chris Gibbins	243	3	
Majority		414		
Turnout		7,248	66	
Conservative hold		Swing		

=== Brinnington & Central ===
Brinnington & Central
Party	Candidate	Votes	%	±%
Labour	Chris Murphy*	2,860	57	
UKIP	John Wild	991	20	
Conservative	Rosalind Lloyd	520	10	
Liberal Democrats	Colin Gell	308	6	
Green	Christopher Green	244	5	
Left Unity	Ali Treacher	48	1	
Independent	John Heginbotham	35	1	
Majority		1,869		
Turnout		5,006		
Labour hold		Swing		

=== Cheadle & Gatley ===
Cheadle & Gatley
Party	Candidate	Votes	%	±%
Liberal Democrats	Graham Greenhalgh	3,056	36	
Conservative	Graham Haslam	2,602	31	
Labour	Colin Owen	1,687	20	
UKIP	Michael Buxton	678	8	
Green	Natasha Brooks	410	5	
Majority		454		
Turnout		8,433	71	
Liberal Democrats hold		Swing		

=== Cheadle Hulme North ===
Cheadle Hulme North
Party	Candidate	Votes	%	±%
Liberal Democrats	Paul Porgess*	2,605	37	
Conservative	Sue Carroll	1,735	25	
Labour	Yvonne Guariento	1,480	21	
UKIP	Taff Davies	842	12	
Green	Michael John Padfield	368	5	
Majority		870		
Turnout		7,030	73	
Liberal Democrats hold		Swing		

=== Chealde Hulme South ===
Cheadle Hulme South
Party	Candidate	Votes	%	±%
Liberal Democrats	Suzanne Wyatt*	2,907	37	
Conservative	Debbie Robinson	2,769	35	
Labour	Chris Carter	984	13	
UKIP	Cyril Peake	785	10	
Green	Philippa Tomczak	420	5	
Majority		138		
Turnout		7,865	73	
Liberal Democrats hold		Swing		

=== Davenport & Cale Green ===
Davenport & Cale Green
Party	Candidate	Votes	%	±%
Labour	Dickie Davies	2,753	43	
UKIP	Dottie Hopkins	1,016	16	
Conservative	Beverley Oliver	932	15	
Liberal Democrats	Ann Smith	734	11	
Independent	Brian Hendley	587	9	
Green	Phil Shaw	394	6	
Majority		1,737		
Turnout		6,416	58	
Labour hold		Swing		

=== Edgeley & Cheadle Heath ===
Edgeley & Cheadle Heath
Party	Candidate	Votes	%	±%
Labour	Richard Coaton*	3,466	55	
Conservative	Alex Kenyon	945	15	
UKIP	Chelsea Smith	857	14	
Liberal Democrats	Danny Langley	549	9	
Green	Camilla Luff	506	8	
Majority		2,521		
Turnout		6,323	59	
Labour hold		Swing		

=== Hazel Grove ===
William Wragg was the incumbent however he instead contested the Hazel Grove Constituency for the Conservative Party.

Hazel Grove
Party	Candidate	Votes	%	±%
Conservative	Julian Lewis-Booth	2,944	39	
Liberal Democrats	Jon Twigge	2,145	28	
Labour	Julie Wharton	1,208	16	
UKIP	Tara O'Brien	1,027	13	
Green	Conrad Beard	294	4	
Majority		799		
Turnout		7,618	70	
Conservative hold		Swing		

=== Heald Green ===
Heald Green
Party	Candidate	Votes	%	±%
Heald Green Ratepayers	Eileen Sylvia Humphreys*	2,788	41	
Conservative	Yvonne Salmons	1,145	17	
Labour	Kathryn Priestley	1,064	16	
Liberal Democrats	David Robert-Jones	820	12	
UKIP	Tony Moore	817	12	
Green	Gordon Combe	200	3	
Majority		1,643		
Turnout		6,834	68	
Heald Green Ratepayers hold		Swing		

=== Heatons North ===
Heatons North
Party	Candidate	Votes	%	±%
Labour	Alex Ganotis*	3,539	46	
Conservative	Natalie Fenton	2,285	30	
Green	Janet Cuff	680	9	
UKIP	Gail Lewis	578	8	
Liberal Democrats	Jenny Humphreys	478	6	
TUSC	Dan Boyle	66	1	
Majority		1,254		
Turnout		7,626	71	
Labour hold		Swing		

=== Heatons South ===
Heatons South
Party	Candidate	Votes	%	±%
Labour	Dean Fitzpatrick*	3,990	51	
Conservative	Alexander Fenton	2,014	26	
UKIP	Janine Kershaw	690	9	
Green	Sam Dugdale	652	8	
Liberal Democrats	Stephen Howarth	530	7	
Majority		1,976		
Turnout		7,876	71	
Labour hold		Swing		

=== Manor ===
Patrick McAuley left the Lib Dems in April 2016 to become an Independent politician.

Manor
Party	Candidate	Votes	%	±%
Liberal Democrats	Patrick McAuley*	2,757	42	
Labour	Walter Barrett	2,146	33	
UKIP	John Kelly	1,276	20	
Green	Todd Hewitt	292	4	
Left Unity	Ria Higham	47	1	
Majority		611		
Turnout		6,518	62	
Liberal Democrats hold		Swing		

=== Marple North ===
Marple North
Party	Candidate	Votes	%	±%
Conservative	Annette Finnie	2,888	38	
Liberal Democrats	Andrew Bispham*	2,550	34	
Labour	David Rowbottom	1,040	14	
UKIP	Ray Jones	609	8	
Green	Maggie Preston	506	7	
Majority		338		
Turnout		7,593	76	
Conservative gain from Liberal Democrats		Swing		

=== Marple South ===
Marple South
Party	Candidate	Votes	%	±%
Conservative	Kenny Blair	2,731	38	
Liberal Democrats	Kevin Dowling*	2,103	29	
Labour	Janet Glover	1,001	14	
UKIP	Darran Palmer	959	13	
Green	Graham Reid	422	6	
Majority		628		
Turnout		7,216	73	
Conservative gain from Liberal Democrats		Swing		

=== Offerton ===
Offerton
Party	Candidate	Votes	%	±%
Liberal Democrats	Wendy Meikle*	2,049	31	
Conservative	Tom Dowse	1,781	27	
Labour	Charlie Stewart	1,460	22	
UKIP	Grahame Bradbury	1,115	17	
Green	Hannah Arnold	209	3	
Majority		268		
Turnout		6,614	63	
Liberal Democrats hold		Swing		

=== Reddish North ===
Reddish North
Party	Candidate	Votes	%	±%
Labour	Roy Driver	3,335	54	
UKIP	Gary Bernard	1,120	18	
Conservative	Anthony Hannay	1,052	17	
Green	Joe Lucy	405	7	
Liberal Democrats	Denise Brewster	213	3	
Majority		2,215		
Turnout		6,125	57	
Labour hold		Swing		

=== Reddish South ===
Reddish South
Party	Candidate	Votes	%	±%
Labour	Walter Brett*	3,499	54	
Conservative	Ciaran Kilheeney	1,308	20	
UKIP	Julie Warburton	887	14	
Green	Jess Northey	451	7	
Liberal Democrats	John Reid	331	5	
Majority		2,191		
Turnout		6,476	62	
Labour hold		Swing		

=== Stepping Hill ===
Stepping Hill
Party	Candidate	Votes	%	±%
Conservative	Paul Hadfield	2,284	32	
Liberal Democrats	Ben Alexander*	2,121	30	
Labour	Janet Rothwell	1,596	22	
UKIP	Izzy Bolton	730	10	
Green	Stephen Torley	376	5	
Majority		163		
Turnout		7,107	71	
Conservative gain from Liberal Democrats		Swing		

== Council make up ==
After the 2015 local election, the political make up of the council was as follows:

Party	Number of councillors
Liberal Democrats	26
Labour	21
Conservative	13
Heald Green Independent Ratepayers	3

== Changes 2015–2016 ==
Patrick McAuley left the Liberal Democrats in April 2016 to sit as an independent.
