= Davenport and Cale Green =

Electoral division of Stockport, England

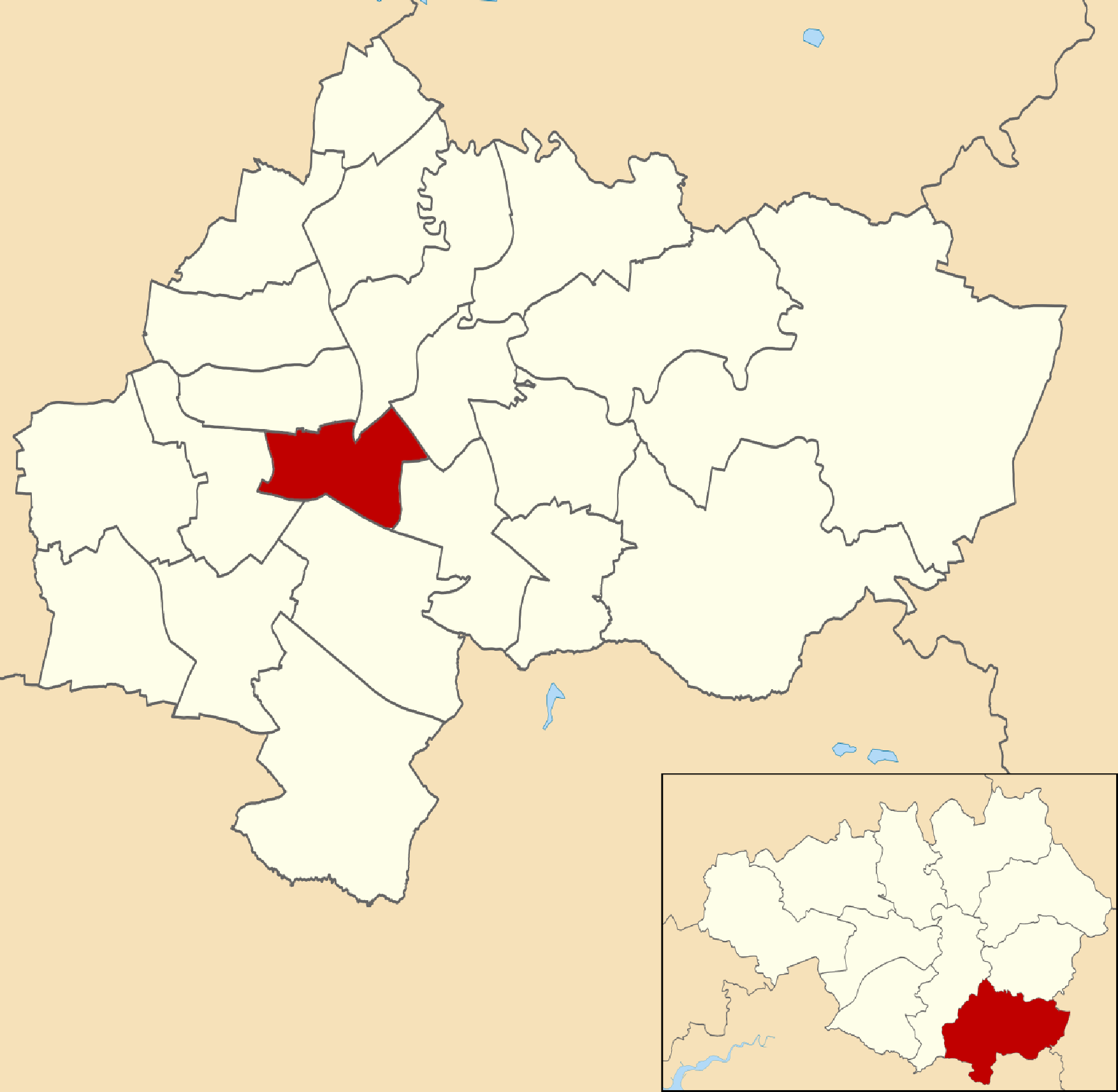
- Davenport and Cale Green within Stockport
- Population: 10,928 (2010)
- Country: England
- Sovereign state: United Kingdom
- UK Parliament: Stockport
- Councillors: Elise Wilson (Labour); Dickie Davies (Labour); Wendy Wild (Labour)

Davenport and Cale Green is an electoral ward in Stockport, England, which elects three councillors to Stockport Metropolitan Borough Council.

Davenport railway station falls outside the ward, as does Davenport Park and the site of the former Davenport Cinema. The ward is north of Bramhall North and south of Brinnington and Central.

== Councillors ==
The ward is represented in Parliament by Nav Mishra MP for Stockport.

The ward is represented on Stockport Metropolitan Borough Council by:

- Paul Wright (Lab)
- Dickie Davies (Lab)
- Alice Delemare (Lib Dem)

Election	Councillor	Councillor	Councillor
2004	David White (Lib Dem)	Roy Driver (Lib Dem)	John Abrams (Lib Dem)
2006	David White (Lib Dem)	Roy Driver (Lib Dem)	John Abrams (Lib Dem)
2007	David White (Lib Dem)	Roy Driver (Lib Dem)	John Abrams (Lib Dem)
2008	David White (Lib Dem)	Roy Driver (Lib Dem)	Ann Smith (Lib Dem)
2010	David White (Lib Dem)	Roy Driver (Lib Dem)	Ann Smith (Lib Dem)
February 2011	David White (Ind)	Roy Driver (Ind)	Ann Smith (Lib Dem)
March 2011	David White (Lab)	Roy Driver (Lab)	Ann Smith (Lib Dem)
May 2011	David White (Lab)	Brian Hendley (Lab)	Ann Smith (Lib Dem)
2012	David White (Lab)	Brian Hendley (Lab)	Wendy Wild (Lab)
2014	Elise Wilson (Lab)	Brian Hendley (Lab)	Wendy Wild (Lab)
2015	Elise Wilson (Lab)	Dickie Davies (Lab)	Wendy Wild (Lab)
2016	Elise Wilson (Lab)	Dickie Davies (Lab)	Wendy Wild (Lab)
2018	Elise Wilson (Lab)	Dickie Davies (Lab)	Wendy Wild (Lab)
2019	Elise Wilson (Lab)	Dickie Davies (Lab)	Wendy Wild (Lab)
2021	Elise Wilson (Lab)	Dickie Davies (Lab)	Wendy Wild (Lab)
2022	Elise Wilson (Lab)	Dickie Davies (Lab)	Wendy Wild (Lab)
2023	Janet Mobbs (Lab)	Dickie Davies (Lab)	Wendy Wild (Lab)
2024	Paul Wright (Lab)	Dickie Davies (Lab)	Wendy Wild (Lab)
2026	Paul Wright (Lab)	Dickie Davies (Lab)	Alice Delemare (Lib Dem)

indicates seat up for re-election. indicates seat won in by-election. indicates councillor defected.

== Elections in 2010s ==
=== May 2019 ===
2019
Party	Candidate	Votes	%	±%
Labour	Dickie Davies	1,650	57	
Liberal Democrats	Gemma-Jane Bowker	469	16	
Green	Chris Gibbins	424	15	
Conservative	Sam Baxter	370	13	
Majority		1,181		
Turnout		2,913	27	
Labour hold		Swing		

=== May 2018 ===
2018
Party	Candidate	Votes	%	±%
Labour	Elise Wilson	2,019	66	
Conservative	Daniel Hamilton	561	18	
Liberal Democrats	Natalie Bird	302	10	
Green	Chris Gibbins	179	6	
Majority		1,458		
Turnout		3,061	28	
Labour hold		Swing		

=== May 2016 ===
2016
Party	Candidate	Votes	%	±%
Labour	Wendy Wild	1,935	57	
UKIP	Dottie Hopkins	469	14	
Liberal Democrats	Helen Shaw	411	12	
Conservative	Gill Shaw	390	11	
Green	Chris Gibbins	194	6	
Majority		1,466		
Turnout		3,399	32	
Labour hold		Swing		

=== May 2015 ===
2015
Party	Candidate	Votes	%	±%
Labour	Dickie Davies	2,753	43	
UKIP	Dottie Hopkins	1,016	16	
Conservative	Beverley Oliver	932	15	
Liberal Democrats	Ann Smith	734	11	
Independent	Brian Hendley	587	9	
Green	Phil Shaw	394	6	
Majority		1,737		
Turnout		6,416	58	
Labour hold		Swing		

=== May 2014 ===
2014
Party	Candidate	Votes	%	±%
Labour	Elise Wilson	1,557	43%	−2.92%
Liberal Democrats	Ann Smith	900	25%	−13.01%
UKIP	Doreen Sheila Hopkins	650	18%	N/A
Conservative	Julie Wragg	282	8%	−0.59%
Green	Phil Shaw	245	7%	+0.66%
Majority		657	18%	
Turnout		3634		
Labour gain from Liberal Democrats		Swing		

=== May 2012 ===
2012
Party	Candidate	Votes	%	±%
Labour	Wendy Wild	1,492	45.92	+17.19
Liberal Democrats	Ann Smith	1,235	38.01	−7.39
Conservative	Jackie Jones	279	8.59	−10.15
Green	Phil Shaw	206	6.34	N/A
Liberal	Graham Ogden	37	1.14	N/A
Majority		257	7.91	
Turnout		3,260	29.54	
Labour gain from Liberal Democrats		Swing		

=== May 2011 ===
2011
Party	Candidate	Votes	%	±%
Labour	Brian Hendley	2,083	54.0	
Liberal Democrats	John Reid	819	21.2	
Conservative	Bryan Lees	607	15.7	
Green	Phil Shaw	320	8.3	
Majority		1,264		
Turnout		3,858	35.26	
Labour gain from Liberal Democrats		Swing		
