= 2007 Stockport Metropolitan Borough Council election =

2007 UK local government election

Map showing the results of the 2007 Stockport Metropolitan Borough Council elections by ward.

Elections to Stockport Metropolitan Borough Council were held on 3 May 2007. One third of the council was up for election. The Liberal Democrats retained overall control of the council with a majority of 9 councillors. The overall turnout was 36.7%.

Following the election, the make up of the council was as follows;

Party	Seats	±	% votes
Liberal Democrat	36	+1	
Labour	15	0	
Conservative	9	-1	
Heald Green Ratepayer	3	0	

== Ward results ==
=== Bramhall North ward ===
Bramhall North
Party	Candidate	Votes	%	±%
Liberal Democrats	Foster-Grime, H.	2,525	47.5	
Conservative	McCarron, R.B.	2457	46.3	
BNP	Gordon, D.R.	186	3.5	
Labour	Priestly, K.A.	143	2.7	
Majority		68	1.3	
Rejected ballots		10	0.2	
Turnout		5321	50.7	
Liberal Democrats gain from Conservative		Swing		

=== Bramhall South ward ===
Bramhall South
Party	Candidate	Votes	%	±%
Conservative	Bellis, P.J.	2,713	56.5	
Liberal Democrats	Grice, L.	1787	37.2	
UKIP	Perry, D.M.	155	3.2	
Labour	Dykes, B.M.	151	3.1	
Majority		926	19.3	
Rejected ballots		7	0.1	
Turnout		4813	49.6	
Conservative hold		Swing		

=== Bredbury and Woodley ward ===
Bredbury and Woodley
Party	Candidate	Votes	%	±%
Liberal Democrats	Wilson, M.	2,018	65.8	
Conservative	Gibbons, K.	695	22.7	
Labour	Stanway, C.	354	11.5	
Majority		1323	43.1	
Rejected ballots		26	0.8	
Turnout		3093	28.3	
Liberal Democrats hold		Swing		

=== Bredbury Green and Romiley ward ===
Bredbury Green and Romiley
Party	Candidate	Votes	%	±%
Liberal Democrats	Margaret P. McLay	1,993	46.8	
Conservative	Rogers, J.D.	1902	44.6	
Labour	Bray, P.H.	366	8.6	
Majority		91	2.1	
Rejected ballots		8	0.2	
Turnout		4269	39	
Liberal Democrats hold		Swing		

=== Brinnington and Central ward ===
Brinnington and Central
Party	Candidate	Votes	%	±%
Labour	Chris Murphy	1,233	49.6	
Liberal Democrats	Walker, C.	998	40.1	
Conservative	Heginbotham, J.E.	257	10.3	
Majority		235	9.4	
Rejected ballots		17	0.7	
Turnout		2505	25.1	
Labour hold		Swing		

=== Cheadle and Gatley ward ===
Cheadle and Gatley
Party	Candidate	Votes	%	±%
Liberal Democrats	King, P.	2,416	52.7	
Conservative	Rankin, J.A.	1762	38.4	
Labour	Owen, C.	409	8.9	
Majority		654	14.3	
Rejected ballots		19	0.4	
Turnout		4606	40.6	
Liberal Democrats hold		Swing		

=== Cheadle Hulme North ward ===
Cheadle Hulme North
Party	Candidate	Votes	%	±%
Liberal Democrats	Porgess, P.	2,086	58.8	
Conservative	Radmore, C.	1010	28.5	
Labour	Harrop, B.A.	275	7.8	
UKIP	Peake, H.	174	4.9	
Majority		1076	30.4	
Rejected ballots		9	0.3	
Turnout		3554	35.9	
Liberal Democrats hold		Swing		

=== Cheadle Hulme South ward ===
Cheadle Hulme South
Party	Candidate	Votes	%	±%
Liberal Democrats	Wyatt, S.M.	2,350	52.3	
Conservative	Roscoe, M.L.	1714	38.1	
Labour	Sinclair, K.L.	160	3.6	
Green	Leaver, D.N.	137	3	
UKIP	Peake, C.A.	136	3	
Majority		636	14.1	
Rejected ballots		8	0.2	
Turnout		4505	44.1	
Liberal Democrats hold		Swing		

=== Davenport and Cale Green ward ===
Davenport and Cale Green
Party	Candidate	Votes	%	±%
Liberal Democrats	Roy Driver	1,235	38.3	
Labour	Hendley, B.J.	1070	33.1	
Conservative	Holgate, C.	500	15.5	
BNP	Stansfield, P.D.	323	10	
UKIP	Crossley, M.	100	3.1	
Majority		165	5.1	
Rejected ballots		16	0.5	
Turnout		3244	30.2	
Liberal Democrats hold		Swing		

=== Edgeley and Cheadle Heath ward ===
Edgeley and Cheadle Heath
Party	Candidate	Votes	%	±%
Labour	Richard Coaton	1,558	45.5	
Liberal Democrats	Rawling, A.	1139	33.2	
Conservative	Charlesworth, Beryl	444	13	
BNP	Chadfield, R.	285	8.3	
Majority		419	12.2	
Rejected ballots		10	0.3	
Turnout		3436	32.2	
Labour hold		Swing		

=== Hazel Grove ward ===
Hazel Grove
Party	Candidate	Votes	%	±%
Liberal Democrats	Corris, C.	2,265	53.8	
Conservative	Lewis-Booth, J.A.	1647	39.1	
Labour	Bradley, Y.C.	298	7.1	
Majority		618	14.7	
Rejected ballots		17	0.4	
Turnout		4227	39.4	
Liberal Democrats hold		Swing		

=== Heald Green ward ===
Heald Green
Party	Candidate	Votes	%	±%
Independent	Eileen Sylvia Humphreys	2,370	62.7	
Liberal Democrats	Roberts-Jones, D.M.	524	13.9	
Conservative	Stevenson, R.J.	406	10.7	
BNP	Skill, R.C.	263	7	
Labour	Junejo, M.A.	214	5.7	
Majority		1846	48.9	
Rejected ballots		5	0.1	
Turnout		3782	37.8	
Independent hold		Swing		

=== Heatons North ward ===
Heatons North
Party	Candidate	Votes	%	±%
Conservative	Jackie Jones	1,939	49.8	
Labour	Pollard, M.	1124	28.9	
Liberal Democrats	Moss, P.	448	11.5	
Green	Cuff, J.	381	9.8	
Majority		815	20.9	
Rejected ballots		8	0.2	
Turnout		3900	37.1	
Conservative hold		Swing		

=== Heatons South ward ===
Heatons South
Party	Candidate	Votes	%	±%
Labour	Breen, O.	1,647	40.3	
Conservative	Lees, B.M.	1624	39.8	
Liberal Democrats	Mustafa, M.G.	423	10.4	
Green	Hardman, T.	391	9.6	
Majority		23	0.6	
Rejected ballots		11	0.3	
Turnout		4096	38.1	
Labour hold		Swing		

=== Manor ward ===
Manor
Party	Candidate	Votes	%	±%
Liberal Democrats	Jenny Humphreys*	1,324	43.9	
Labour	Lechner, B.	808	26.8	
Conservative	Charlesworth, Barry	412	13.7	
BNP	Warner, D.N.	380	12.6	
Independent	Russell, B.	94	3.1	
Majority		516	17.1	
Rejected ballots		7	0.2	
Turnout		3025	29.1	
Liberal Democrats hold		Swing		

=== Marple North ward ===
Marple North
Party	Candidate	Votes	%	±%
Liberal Democrats	Bispham, A.J.	2,089	51.6	
Conservative	Walsh, C.	1226	30.3	
Green	Preston, M.	376	9.3	
Labour	Townsend, S.	268	6.6	
Independent	Russell, L.	88	2.2	
Majority		863	21.3	
Rejected ballots		11	0.3	
Turnout		4058	41.7	
Liberal Democrats hold		Swing		

=== Marple South ward ===
Marple South
Party	Candidate	Votes	%	±%
Liberal Democrats	Baker, C.	2,099	53.4	
Conservative	Labrey, K.E.	1215	30.9	
Green	Reid, G.D.	225	5.7	
Labour	Rowbottom, D.E.	205	5.2	
UKIP	Moore, A.H.	188	4.8	
Majority		884	22.5	
Rejected ballots		6	0.2	
Turnout		3938	40.9	
Liberal Democrats hold		Swing		

=== Offerton ward ===
Offerton
Party	Candidate	Votes	%	±%
Liberal Democrats	Wendy Meikle	1,582	48.0	
Conservative	Lewis-Booth, N.	552	16.7	
BNP	Maher, S.P.	430	13.0	
Labour	Ball, S.	371	11.2	
Independent	Ryan, K.	363	11.0	
Majority		1030	31.2	
Rejected ballots		7	0.2	
Turnout		3305	31.6	
Liberal Democrats hold		Swing		

=== Reddish North ward ===
Reddish North
Party	Candidate	Votes	%	±%
Labour	David Owen	1,522	53.8	
Conservative	Hannay, A.	564	19.9	
BNP	Bennett, P.R.	420	14.8	
Liberal Democrats	Davenport, A.	323	11.4	
Majority		958	33.9	
Rejected ballots		16	0.6	
Turnout		2845	27.2	
Labour hold		Swing		

=== Reddish South ward ===
Reddish South
Party	Candidate	Votes	%	±%
Labour	Brett, W.J.	1,415	48.8	
Conservative	Burt, S.	545	18.8	
Liberal Democrats	Langley, D.	486	16.8	
UKIP	Price, G.	454	15.7	
Majority		870	30	
Rejected ballots		7	0.2	
Turnout		2907	27.8	
Labour hold		Swing		

=== Stepping Hill ward ===
Stepping Hill
Party	Candidate	Votes	%	±%
Liberal Democrats	Alexander, B.	2,016	46.3	
Conservative	Holt, L.M.	1751	40.2	
Labour	Rothwell, J.M.	369	8.5	
Green	Pease, K.	220	5.1	
Majority		265	6.1	
Rejected ballots		7	0.2	
Turnout		4363	44.8	
Liberal Democrats hold		Swing		
