= Hazel Grove (ward) =

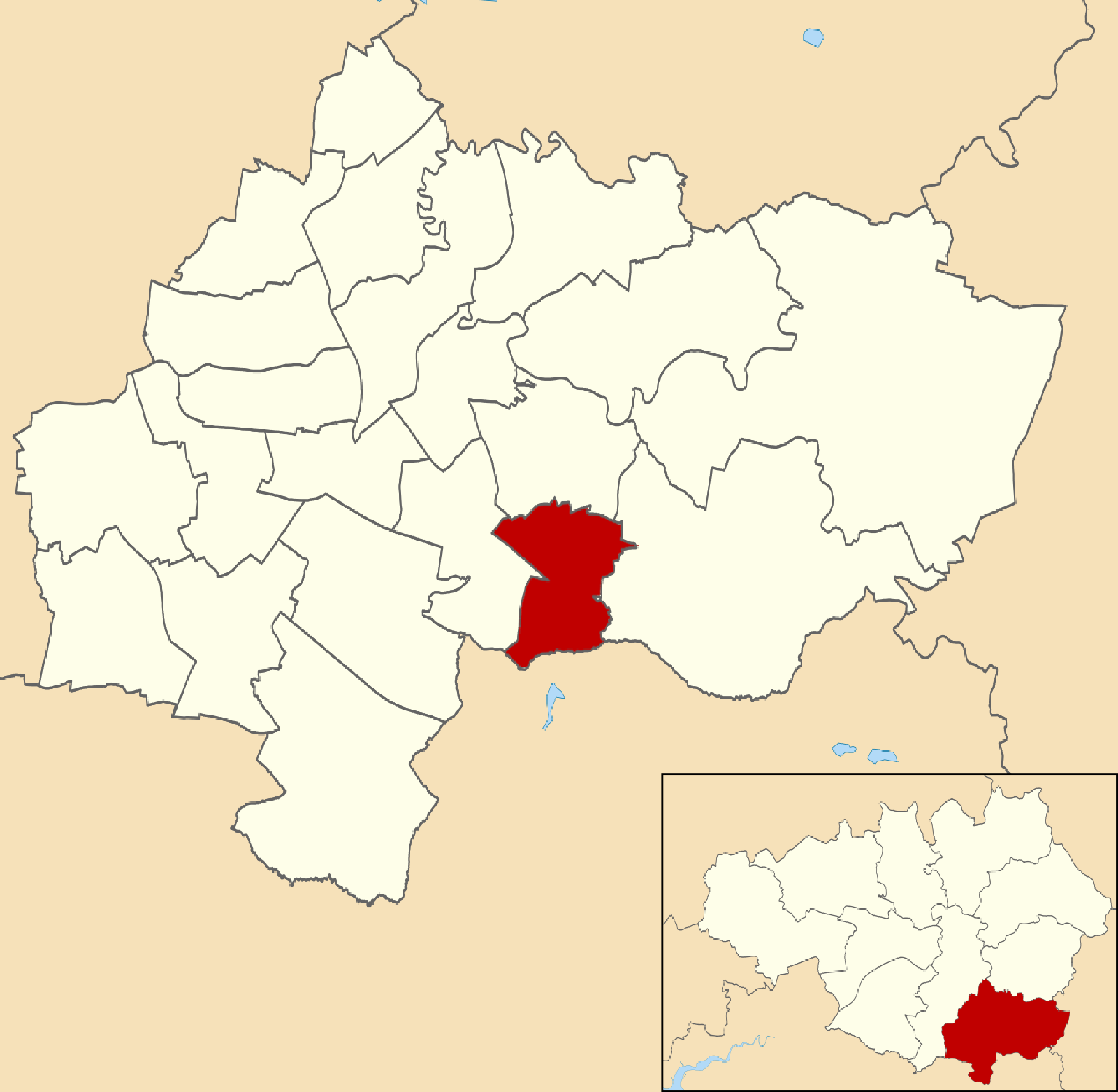
- Hazel Grove within Stockport
- Population: 11,051 (2010)
- Country: England
- Sovereign state: United Kingdom
- UK Parliament: Hazel Grove
- Councillors: Paul Ankers (Liberal Democrat); Lou Ankers (Liberal Democrat); Oliver Johnstone (Conservative)

Hazel Grove is an electoral ward in the Metropolitan Borough of Stockport. It elects three Councillors to Stockport Metropolitan Borough Council using the first past the post electoral method, electing one Councillor every year without election on the fourth.

It covers the eastern part of Hazel Grove, including Norbury Moor and Torkington Park. Together with Bredbury & Woodley, Bredbury Green and Romiley, Marple North, Marple South and Offerton it constitutes the Hazel Grove Parliamentary constituency.

== Councillors ==
Hazel Grove electoral ward is represented in Westminster by Lisa Smart MP for Hazel Grove.

The ward is represented on Stockport Council by three councillors: Jake Austin (Lib Dem), Frankie Singleton (Lib Dem), and Wendy Meikle (Lib Dem).

Election	Councillor	Councillor	Councillor
2004	Stuart Corris (Lib Dem)	Christine Corris (Lib Dem)	Kevin Hogg (Lib Dem)
2006	Stuart Corris (Lib Dem)	Christine Corris (Lib Dem)	Kevin Hogg (Lib Dem)
2007	Stuart Corris (Lib Dem)	Christine Corris (Lib Dem)	Kevin Hogg (Lib Dem)
2008	Stuart Corris (Lib Dem)	Christine Corris (Lib Dem)	Kevin Hogg (Lib Dem)
2010	Stuart Corris (Lib Dem)	Christine Corris (Lib Dem)	Kevin Hogg (Lib Dem)
2011	Stuart Corris (Lib Dem)	William Wragg (Con)	Kevin Hogg (Lib Dem)
2012	Stuart Corris (Lib Dem)	William Wragg (Con)	Kevin Hogg (Lib Dem)
2014	Oliver Johnstone (Con)	William Wragg (Con)	Kevin Hogg (Lib Dem)
2015	Oliver Johnstone (Con)	Julian Lewis-Booth (Con)	Kevin Hogg (Lib Dem)
2016	Oliver Johnstone (Con)	Julian Lewis-Booth (Con)	Jon Twigge (Lib Dem)
2018	Paul Ankers (Lib Dem)	Julian Lewis-Booth (Con)	Jon Twigge (Lib Dem)
May 2019	Paul Ankers (Lib Dem)	Lou Ankers (Lib Dem)	Jon Twigge (Lib Dem)
By-election; 1 August 2019	Paul Ankers (Lib Dem)	Lou Ankers (Lib Dem)	Charles Gibson (Lib Dem)
2021	Paul Ankers (Lib Dem)	Lou Ankers (Lib Dem)	Oliver Johnstone (Con)
2022	Paul Ankers (Lib Dem)	Lou Ankers (Lib Dem)	Oliver Johnstone (Con)
2023	Jake Austin (Lib Dem)	Wendy Meikle (Lib Dem)	Frankie Singleton (Lib Dem)
2024	Jake Austin (Lib Dem)	Wendy Meikle (Lib Dem)	Frankie Singleton (Lib Dem)

indicates seat up for re-election. indicates seat won in by-election.

== Elections in the 2020s ==
=== May 2024 ===
Hazel Grove
Party	Candidate	Votes	%	±%
Liberal Democrats	Frankie Singleton*	1,524	42.1	−0.7
Conservative	Tim Morley	937	25.9	−1.3
Labour	Johnny White	757	20.9	+7.1
Green	Fiona Bullock	401	11.1	+0.1
Majority		587	16.2	
Turnout		3,679	35.3	+2.7
Registered electors		10,432		
Liberal Democrats hold		Swing		

=== May 2023 ===
Hazel Grove (3)
Party	Candidate	Votes	%
Liberal Democrats	Jake Austin	1,662	48.8
Liberal Democrats	Wendy Meikle	1,596	46.9
Liberal Democrats	Frankie Singleton	1,458	42.8
Conservative	Bill Law	924	27.2
Conservative	Elizabeth Arnold	891	26.2
Conservative	Andrew Baker	891	26.2
Labour	Carl Carrigan	708	20.8
Labour	Linda Paton	544	16.0
Labour	Johnny White	468	13.8
Green	Mary Bullock	375	11.0
Rejected ballots		18	
Turnout		3,403	32.6
Total votes		9,517	
Registered electors		10,451	
Liberal Democrats win (new seat)			
Liberal Democrats win (new seat)			
Liberal Democrats win (new seat)			

=== May 2022 ===
Hazel Grove
Party	Candidate	Votes	%	±%
Liberal Democrats	Paul Ankers*	2,107	48.1	+11
Conservative	Tony Moore	1,543	35.2	−10
Labour	Georgia Lynott	534	12.2	−3
Green	Catherine de Cadorette	183	4.2	+1
Majority		564	12.9	
Rejected ballots		15	0.3	
Turnout		4,382	40.0	−5
Registered electors		11,493		
Liberal Democrats hold		Swing		

=== May 2021 (delayed from May 2020 due to Covid) ===
2021
Party	Candidate	Votes	%	±%
Conservative	Oliver Johnstone	2,212	45	+16
Liberal Democrats	Charles Gibson *	1,848	37	−11
Labour Co-op	Christine Carrigan	725	15	+4
Green	Catherine De Cadorette	169	3	−1
Majority		364		
Turnout		4,990	45	
Registered electors		10,987		
Conservative gain from Liberal Democrats		Swing		

== Elections in the 2010s ==
=== August 2019 (by-election) ===
By-election 1 August 2019
Party	Candidate	Votes	%	±%
Liberal Democrats	Charles Alexander Gibson	1,401	46	
Conservative	Oliver James Johnstone	1,194	39	
Labour	Julie Anne Wharton	329	11	
Green	Michael John Padfield	142	5	
Majority		207		
Turnout		3,066	28	
Liberal Democrats hold		Swing		

The by-election occurred due to the resignation of the incumbent Liberal Democrats councillor Jon Twigge.

=== May 2019 ===
2019
Party	Candidate	Votes	%	±%
Liberal Democrats	Lou Ankers	1,993	47.69	+3.63
Conservative	Julian Anthony Lewis-Booth	1,225	29.31	−11.27
Labour	Julie Anne Wharton	457	10.94	−1.46
UKIP	Eunice Ann Normansell	321	7.68	N/A
Green	Clare Brown	183	4.38	+1.42
Majority		768	18.38	
Turnout		4,179	39	
Liberal Democrats gain from Conservative		Swing		

=== May 2018 ===
2018
Party	Candidate	Votes	%	±%
Liberal Democrats	Paul Ankers	1,965	44.06	
Conservative	Oliver James Johnstone	1,810	40.58	
Labour	Julie Wharton	553	12.40	
Green	Ken Pease	132	2.96	
Majority		155	3.48	
Turnout		4,460	41	
Liberal Democrats gain from Conservative		Swing		

=== May 2016 ===
2016
Party	Candidate	Votes	%	±%
Liberal Democrats	Jon Twigge	1,777	39	
Conservative	Sue Carroll	1,494	33	
Labour	Julie Wharton	634	14	
UKIP	Tara O'Brien	534	12	
Green	Ken Pease	120	3	
Majority		283		
Turnout		4,559	43	
Liberal Democrats hold		Swing		

=== May 2015 ===
2015
Party	Candidate	Votes	%	±%
Conservative	Julian Lewis-Booth	2,944	39	
Liberal Democrats	Jon Twigge	2,145	28	
Labour	Julie Wharton	1,208	16	
UKIP	Tara O'Brien	1,027	13	
Green	Conrad Beard	294	4	
Majority		799		
Turnout		7,618	70	
Conservative hold		Swing		

=== May 2014 ===
2014
Party	Candidate	Votes	%	±%
Conservative	Oliver James Johnstone	1,700	38%	−2.41%
Liberal Democrats	Stuart Corris	1414	31%	−11.05%
UKIP	Tony Moore	692	15%	N/A
Labour	Janet Elizabeth Glover	488	11%	−6.54%
Green	Rob Turner	208	5%	N/A
Majority		286	7%	+5.35%
Turnout		4502		
Conservative gain from Liberal Democrats		Swing		

=== May 2012 ===
2012
Party	Candidate	Votes	%	±%
Liberal Democrats	Kevin Hogg	1,736	42.05	−12.80
Conservative	Oliver Johnstone	1,668	40.41	+1.39
Labour	Catherine Sheppard	724	17.54	+11.41
Majority		68	1.65	
Turnout		4,148	37.63	
Liberal Democrats hold		Swing		

=== May 2011 ===
2011
Party	Candidate	Votes	%	±%
Conservative	William Wragg	1,918	38.8	+2.4
Liberal Democrats	Christine Corris	1,789	36.1	−14.9
Labour	Karen Vickers	892	18.0	+6.2
UKIP	Mark Shanahan	331	6.7	
Majority		129		
Turnout		4,949	44.73	
Conservative gain from Liberal Democrats		Swing		

=== May 2010 ===
2010
Party	Candidate	Votes	%	±%
Liberal Democrats	Stuart Corris	3,777	51.0	
Conservative	William Wragg	2,697	36.4	
Labour	Karen Vickers	884	11.9	
Majority		1,080	14.6	
Turnout		7,402	67.0	
Liberal Democrats hold		Swing		

== Elections in the 2000s ==
2008
Party	Candidate	Votes	%	±%
Liberal Democrats	Kevin Hogg	2,345	54.9	
Conservative	Julian Lewis-Booth	1,668	39.0	
Labour	Yvonne Bradley	262	6.1	
Majority		677	15.8	
Liberal Democrats hold		Swing		

2007
Party	Candidate	Votes	%	±%
Liberal Democrats	Corris, C.	2,265	53.8	
Conservative	Lewis-Booth, J.A.	1647	39.1	
Labour	Bradley, Y.C.	298	7.1	
Majority		618	14.7	
Rejected ballots		17	0.4	
Turnout		4227	39.4	
Liberal Democrats hold		Swing		

2006
Party	Candidate	Votes	%	±%
Liberal Democrats	Stuart Corris	2,281	53.9	
Conservative	J. Lewis-Booth	1,509	35.7	
Labour	Y. Bradley	296	7.0	
Independent	D. Ryan	142	3.4	
Majority		772		
Turnout			39.3	
Liberal Democrats hold		Swing		

2004
Party	Candidate	Votes	%	±%
Liberal Democrats	Kevin Hogg	2,844	53.1	
Liberal Democrats	Christine Corris	2,835		
Liberal Democrats	Stuart Corris	2,781		
Conservative	J. Lewis-Booth	1,919	35.8	
Conservative	K. Labrey	1,904		
Conservative	N. Menzies	1,709		
Labour	Y. Bradley	592	11.1	
Labour	J. Steven	439		
Labour	A. Verdeille	395		
Majority				
Turnout			48.9	

2003
Party	Candidate	Votes	%	±%
Liberal Democrats	Christine Corris	2,193	59.4	+6.1
Conservative	Thomas Anthony Dunstan	1,223	33.1	−5.8
Labour	Terence Morley	275	7.5	−0.3
Majority		970	26.3	+12.0
Turnout		3,691	29.9	−9.8
Liberal Democrats hold		Swing		
