= 1990 Stockport Metropolitan Borough Council election =

Local election in Stockport

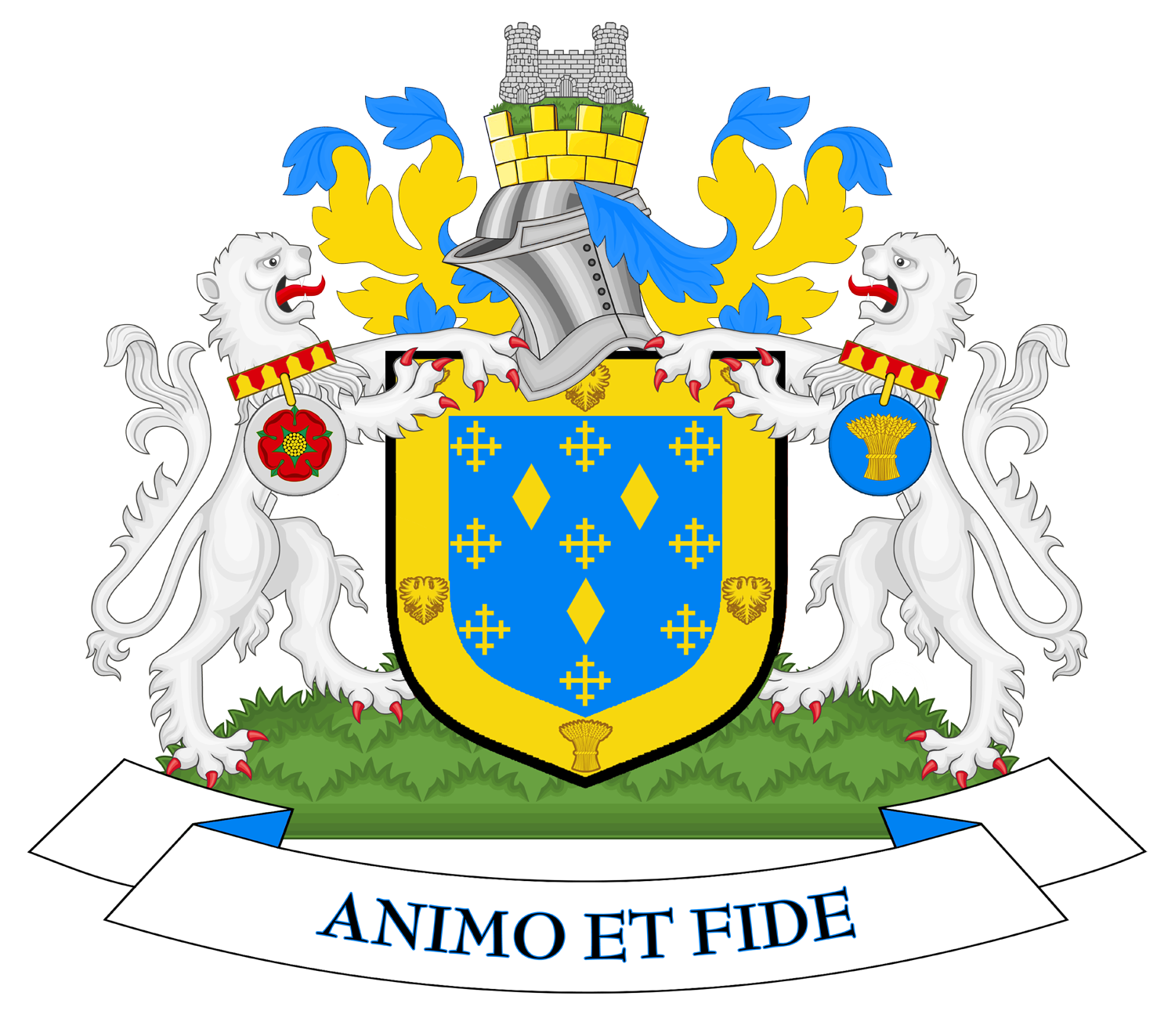
← 1988	3 May 1990	1991 →

21 of 63 seats to Stockport Metropolitan Borough Council 32 seats needed for a majority
	First party	Second party	Third party
Leader	Eric Kime	John Needham	Ann Coffey
Party	Liberal Democrats	Conservative	Labour
Leader's seat	South Marple	Cheadle	South Reddish
Last election	6 seats, 28.0%	10 seats, 39.4%	5 seats, 25.0%
Seats before	25	21	14
Seats won	8	4	8
Seats after	25	18	17
Seat change	Steady	▼3	▲3
Popular vote	36,693	36,021	40,759
Percentage	30.2%	29.6%	33.5%
Swing	▲2.2%	▼9.8%	▲8.5%
	Fourth party
Leader	Ron Stenson
Party	Heald Green Ratepayers
Leader's seat	Heald Green
Last election	1 seat, 3.0%
Seats before	3
Seats won	1
Seats after	3
Seat change	Steady
Popular vote	3,167
Percentage	2.6%
Swing	▼0.4%
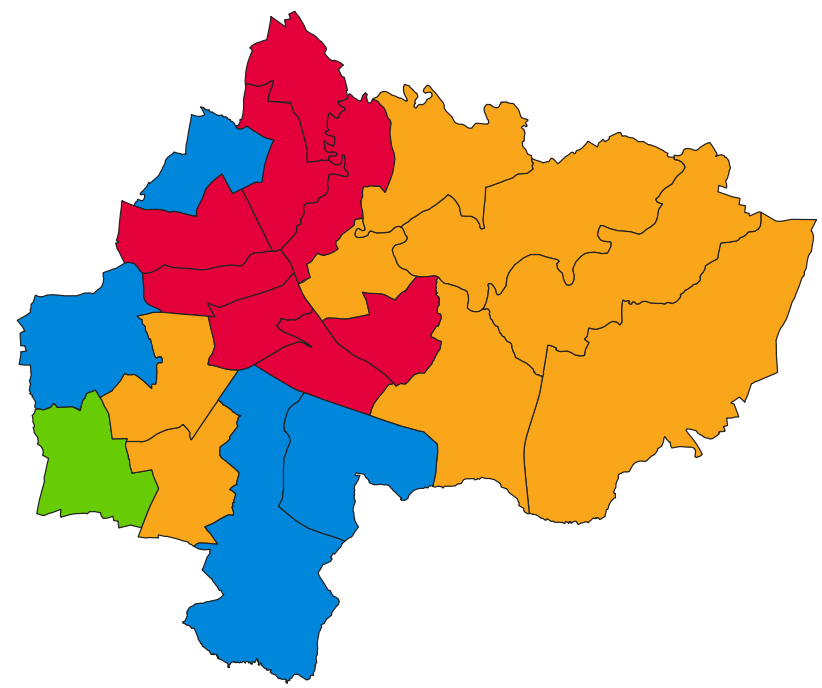
- Map of results of 1990 election
Leader of the Council before election
No leader
No overall control
Leader of the Council after election
No leader
No overall control

Elections to Stockport Council were held on Thursday, 3 May 1990. One third of the council was up for election, with each successful candidate to serve a four-year term of office, expiring in 1994. The council remained under no overall control.

== Election result ==
Party	Votes		Seats			Full Council	
Liberal Democrats	36,693 (30.2%)	▲2.2	8 (38.1%)	8 / 21	Steady	25 (39.7%)	25 / 63
Conservative Party	36,021 (29.6%)	▼9.8	4 (19.0%)	4 / 21	▼3	18 (28.6%)	18 / 63
Labour Party	40,759 (33.5%)	▲8.5	8 (38.1%)	8 / 21	▲3	17 (27.0%)	17 / 63
Heald Green Ratepayers	3,167 (2.6%)	▼0.4	1 (4.8%)	1 / 21	Steady	3 (4.8%)	3 / 63
Green Party	4,373 (3.6%)	▲1.6	0 (0.0%)	0 / 21	Steady	0 (0.0%)	0 / 63
Independent	328 (0.3%)	N/A	0 (0.0%)	0 / 21	N/A	0 (0.0%)	0 / 63
SDP	325 (0.3%)	▼1.9	0 (0.0%)	0 / 21	Steady	0 (0.0%)	0 / 63

↓
17	25	3	18

== Ward results ==
=== Bredbury ===
Bredbury
Party	Candidate	Votes	%	±%
Liberal Democrats	D. Humphries*	3,156	47.9	−0.7
Labour	J. Woodrow	2,243	34.1	+13.1
Conservative	P. Hooley	1,186	18.0	−11.1
Majority		913	13.8	−5.7
Turnout		6,585	56.4	+11.8
Liberal Democrats hold		Swing		

=== Brinnington ===
Brinnington
Party	Candidate	Votes	%	±%
Labour	E. Gallacher*	3,415	81.1	−1.3
Green	A. McKenzie	292	6.9	+5.3
Conservative	J. Wood	256	6.1	−3.8
Liberal Democrats	F. Cooper	249	5.9	−0.2
Majority		3,123	74.2	+1.7
Turnout		4,212	51.8	+12.6
Labour hold		Swing		

=== Cale Green ===
Cale Green
Party	Candidate	Votes	%	±%
Labour	C. Rutherford	2,495	47.5	+4.9
Liberal Democrats	A. Shaw*	2,144	40.8	+8.0
Conservative	J. Wiedman	425	8.1	−7.6
Green	E. Massey-Corte	137	2.6	+1.3
SDP	D. Owen	49	0.9	−2.9
Majority		351	6.7	−3.1
Turnout		5,250	58.0	+12.4
Labour gain from Liberal Democrats		Swing		

=== Cheadle ===
Cheadle
Party	Candidate	Votes	%	±%
Conservative	J. Needham*	2,651	53.4	−7.7
Liberal Democrats	J. Webb	1,223	24.7	+2.4
Labour	A. Kellett	838	16.9	+5.7
Green	A. Adhemar	201	4.1	+1.8
Independent	S. Hothersall	48	1.0	N/A
Majority		1,428	28.7	−10.1
Turnout		4,961	50.1	+7.3
Conservative hold		Swing		

=== Cheadle Hulme North ===
Cheadle Hulme North
Party	Candidate	Votes	%	±%
Liberal Democrats	K. Anstis*	3,021	49.0	−1.3
Conservative	S. Carroll	1,955	31.7	−5.1
Labour	P. Dykes	1,186	19.2	+9.7
Majority		1,066	17.3	+3.8
Turnout		6,162	51.9	+6.3
Liberal Democrats hold		Swing		

=== Cheadle Hulme South ===
Cheadle Hulme South
Party	Candidate	Votes	%	±%
Liberal Democrats	B. Leah*	3,437	53.3	+7.9
Conservative	E. Minshull	2,421	37.6	−7.7
Labour	D. Wastell	585	9.1	+3.6
Majority		1,016	15.7	+15.6
Turnout		6,443	58.0	+4.9
Liberal Democrats hold		Swing		

=== Davenport ===
Davenport
Party	Candidate	Votes	%	±%
Labour	T. McGee	2,514	49.5	+12.7
Conservative	J. Davidson	1,592	31.4	−14.0
Liberal Democrats	A. McLean	440	8.7	−2.0
SDP	H. Griffiths	276	5.4	+1.0
Green	M. Ledger	255	5.0	+2.4
Majority		922	18.1	
Turnout		5,077	52.6	+7.3
Labour gain from Conservative		Swing		

=== East Bramhall ===
East Bramhall
Party	Candidate	Votes	%	±%
Conservative	A. Doherty*	3,616	51.7	−13.7
Liberal Democrats	G. Livesey	1,933	27.7	+3.3
Labour	E. Symonds	1,061	15.2	+7.3
Green	M. Sullivan	379	5.4	N/A
Majority		1,683	24.0	−17.0
Turnout		6,989	54.1	+7.4
Conservative hold		Swing		

=== Edgeley ===
Edgeley
Party	Candidate	Votes	%	±%
Labour	S. Bailey	2,897	50.0	+13.1
Liberal Democrats	J. Ashworth*	2,228	38.5	−2.2
Conservative	S. Kirkham	506	8.7	−11.8
Green	J. Filmore	162	2.8	+0.8
Majority		669	11.5	
Turnout		5,793	58.5	+11.4
Labour gain from Liberal Democrats		Swing		

=== Great Moor ===
Great Moor
Party	Candidate	Votes	%	±%
Labour	P. Wharton*	2,872	48.1	+15.2
Conservative	J. Stanyer	1,578	26.4	−4.6
Liberal Democrats	S. Oldham	1,330	22.3	−8.8
Green	A. Cooke	194	3.2	+1.5
Majority		1,294	21.7	+19.9
Turnout		5,974	54.7	+8.6
Labour hold		Swing		

=== Hazel Grove ===
Hazel Grove
Party	Candidate	Votes	%	±%
Liberal Democrats	K. Hogg	3,141	44.5	+0.7
Conservative	A. Law*	2,682	38.0	−6.4
Labour	M. Wallis	974	13.8	+5.1
Green	M. Suter	268	3.8	+2.2
Majority		459	6.5	
Turnout		7,065	56.6	+6.0
Liberal Democrats gain from Conservative		Swing		

=== Heald Green ===
Heald Green
Party	Candidate	Votes	%	±%
Heald Green Ratepayers	P. Burns*	3,167	64.8	−4.9
Labour	J. Becker	844	17.3	+8.6
Conservative	L. Morgan	644	13.2	−4.1
Liberal Democrats	D. Roberts Jones	229	4.7	+1.4
Majority		2,323	47.6	−4.8
Turnout		4,884	46.7	+2.7
Heald Green Ratepayers hold		Swing		

=== Heaton Mersey ===
Heaton Mersey
Party	Candidate	Votes	%	±%
Labour	C. Foster	2,706	42.7	+11.9
Conservative	P. Whitney*	2,462	38.9	−10.4
Liberal Democrats	A. Walker	587	9.3	+0.4
Green	D. Carter	576	9.1	+3.6
Majority		244	3.8	
Turnout		6,331	54.3	+8.2
Labour gain from Conservative		Swing		

=== Heaton Moor ===
Heaton Moor
Party	Candidate	Votes	%	±%
Conservative	J. Lloyd*	2,270	45.4	−10.9
Labour	T. Grundy	1,783	35.7	+10.5
Liberal Democrats	S. Beswick	507	10.1	−1.0
Green	G. Leatherbarrow	439	8.8	+1.9
Majority		487	9.7	−20.7
Turnout		4,999	50.2	+3.9
Conservative hold		Swing		

=== Manor ===
Manor
Party	Candidate	Votes	%	±%
Liberal Democrats	C. Phythian	2,483	45.0	−2.1
Labour	I. Jackson*	2,264	41.0	+3.8
Conservative	E. Dennis	615	11.1	−3.1
Green	G. Johnson	156	2.8	+1.3
Majority		219	4.0	−5.9
Turnout		5,518	56.8	+6.3
Liberal Democrats gain from Labour		Swing		

=== North Marple ===
North Marple
Party	Candidate	Votes	%	±%
Liberal Democrats	G. Cropper	2,544	47.7	+0.2
Conservative	W. Partington	1,785	33.5	−6.3
Labour	A. Tognarelli	738	13.8	+4.6
Green	E. Rainer	264	5.0	+2.8
Majority		759	14.2	+6.5
Turnout		5,331	56.1	+4.9
Liberal Democrats hold		Swing		

=== North Reddish ===
North Reddish
Party	Candidate	Votes	%	±%
Labour	P. Halliday*	4,530	76.8	+12.0
Conservative	D. Law	787	13.3	−10.0
Liberal Democrats	A. Strong	382	6.5	−0.5
Green	O. Berger	197	3.3	+1.3
Majority		3,743	63.5	+22.0
Turnout		5,896	49.2	+10.2
Labour hold		Swing		

=== Romiley ===
Romiley
Party	Candidate	Votes	%	±%
Liberal Democrats	N. Wilson	2,381	36.7	+8.5
Conservative	W. Hackett	1,948	30.1	−14.0
Labour	R. Smith	1,645	25.4	+2.0
Independent	R. Handley	280	4.3	N/A
Green	M. Lowe	226	3.5	+1.5
Majority		433	6.6	
Turnout		6,480	56.6	+8.7
Liberal Democrats hold		Swing		

=== South Marple ===
South Marple
Party	Candidate	Votes	%	±%
Liberal Democrats	M. Jackson*	2,777	47.4	+3.2
Conservative	D. Ankers	2,180	37.2	−9.0
Labour	S. Rodrigues	482	8.2	+2.2
Green	S. Thornton-Jones	415	7.1	+4.6
Majority		597	10.2	
Turnout		5,654	58.7	+4.6
Liberal Democrats hold		Swing		

=== South Reddish ===
South Reddish
Party	Candidate	Votes	%	±%
Labour	D. Goddard*	4,054	73.7	+13.5
Conservative	W. Law	917	16.7	−8.8
Liberal Democrats	D. Ibekwe	526	9.6	N/A
Majority		3,137	57.0	+22.3
Turnout		5,497	50.1	+8.7
Labour hold		Swing		

=== West Bramhall ===
West Bramhall
Party	Candidate	Votes	%	±%
Conservative	J. B. Leck*	3,545	55.7	−6.2
Liberal Democrats	P. Calton	1,975	31.0	+5.8
Labour	M. Jones	633	9.9	+2.0
Green	L. Kaufman	212	3.3	+1.6
Majority		1,570	24.7	−11.0
Turnout		6,365	54.0	+9.2
Conservative hold		Swing		
