= 1991 Stockport Metropolitan Borough Council election =

Local election in Stockport

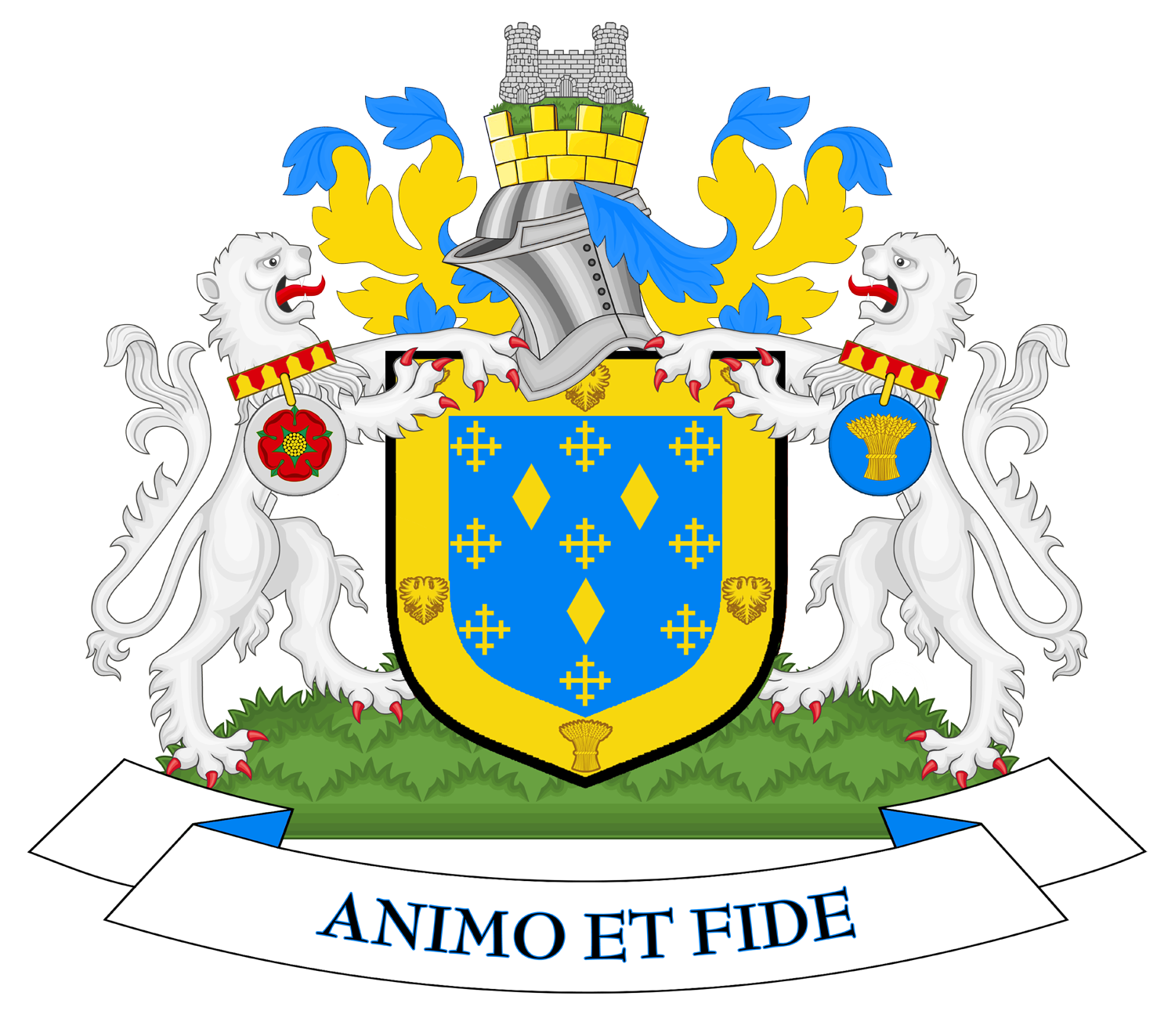
← 1990	2 May 1991	1992 →

21 of 63 seats to Stockport Metropolitan Borough Council 32 seats needed for a majority
	First party	Second party	Third party
Leader	Eric Kime	John Needham	Ann Coffey
Party	Liberal Democrats	Conservative	Labour
Leader's seat	South Marple	Cheadle	South Reddish
Last election	8 seats, 30.2%	4 seats, 29.6%	8 seats, 33.5%
Seats before	25	18	17
Seats won	11	5	4
Seats after	26	17	17
Seat change	▲1	▼1	Steady
Popular vote	40,093	35,867	29,277
Percentage	36.3%	32.4%	26.5%
Swing	▲6.1%	▲2.8%	▼7.0%
	Fourth party
Leader	Ron Stenson
Party	Heald Green Ratepayers
Leader's seat	Heald Green
Last election	1 seat, 2.6%
Seats before	3
Seats won	1
Seats after	3
Seat change	Steady
Popular vote	3,358
Percentage	3.0%
Swing	▲0.4%
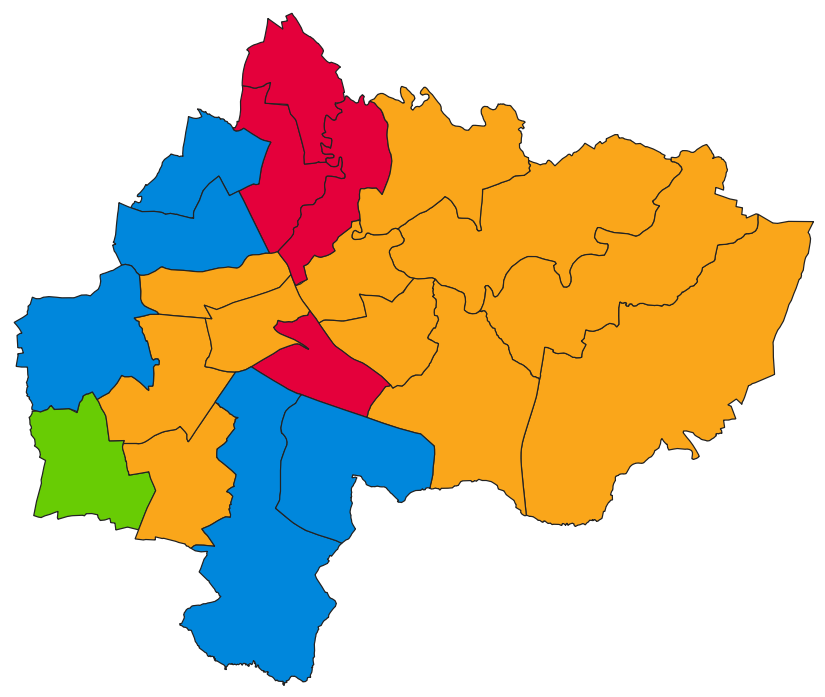
- Map of results of 1991 election
Leader of the Council before election
No leader
No overall control
Leader of the Council after election
No leader
No overall control

Elections to Stockport Council were held on Thursday, 2 May 1991. One third of the council was up for election, with each successful candidate to serve a four-year term of office, expiring in 1995. The council remained under no overall control.

== Election result ==
Party	Votes		Seats			Full Council	
Liberal Democrats	40,093 (36.3%)	▲6.1	11 (52.4%)	11 / 21	▲1	26 (41.3%)	26 / 63
Conservative Party	35,867 (32.4%)	▲2.8	5 (23.8%)	5 / 21	▼1	17 (27.0%)	17 / 63
Labour Party	29,277 (26.5%)	▼7.0	4 (19.0%)	4 / 21	Steady	17 (27.0%)	17 / 63
Heald Green Ratepayers	3,358 (3.0%)	▲0.4	1 (4.8%)	1 / 21	Steady	3 (4.8%)	3 / 63
Green Party	1,937 (1.8%)	▼1.8	0 (0.0%)	0 / 21	Steady	0 (0.0%)	0 / 63

↓
17	26	3	17

== Ward results ==
=== Bredbury ===
Bredbury
Party	Candidate	Votes	%	±%
Liberal Democrats	G. Cooper*	2,760	50.7	+2.8
Labour	S. Humphries	1,685	31.0	−3.1
Conservative	P. Hooley	997	18.3	+0.3
Majority		1,075	19.7	+5.9
Turnout		5,442	46.9	−9.5
Liberal Democrats hold		Swing		

=== Brinnington ===
Brinnington
Party	Candidate	Votes	%	±%
Labour	C. MacAlister*	2,798	79.4	−1.7
Conservative	W. Law	323	9.2	+3.1
Liberal Democrats	A. Strong	296	8.4	+2.5
Green	N. Butterfield	106	3.0	−3.9
Majority		2,475	70.2	−4.0
Turnout		3,523	44.1	−7.7
Labour hold		Swing		

=== Cale Green ===
Cale Green
Party	Candidate	Votes	%	±%
Liberal Democrats	A. Shaw	2,663	57.4	+16.6
Labour	M. Weldon	1,498	32.3	−15.2
Conservative	J. Hurley	417	9.0	+0.9
Green	A. Chisunka	65	1.4	−1.2
Majority		1,165	25.1	
Turnout		4,643	53.1	−4.9
Liberal Democrats gain from Labour		Swing		

=== Cheadle ===
Cheadle
Party	Candidate	Votes	%	±%
Conservative	I. Roberts*	2,579	58.5	+5.1
Liberal Democrats	J. Webb	1,161	26.3	+1.6
Labour	A. Kellett	669	15.2	−1.7
Majority		1,418	32.2	+3.5
Turnout		4,409	45.1	−5.0
Conservative hold		Swing		

=== Cheadle Hulme North ===
Cheadle Hulme North
Party	Candidate	Votes	%	±%
Liberal Democrats	J. Pantall*	2,668	51.1	+2.1
Conservative	L. Morgan	1,703	32.6	+0.9
Labour	P. Dykes	847	16.2	−3.0
Majority		965	18.5	+1.2
Turnout		5,218	44.5	−7.4
Liberal Democrats hold		Swing		

=== Cheadle Hulme South ===
Cheadle Hulme South
Party	Candidate	Votes	%	±%
Liberal Democrats	F. Ridley*	3,244	54.3	+1.0
Conservative	J. Lowry	2,215	37.1	−0.5
Labour	R. Brown	357	6.0	−3.1
Green	S. Davies	162	2.7	N/A
Majority		1,029	17.2	+1.5
Turnout		5,978	53.6	−4.4
Liberal Democrats hold		Swing		

=== Davenport ===
Davenport
Party	Candidate	Votes	%	±%
Labour	M. Jones	2,001	43.4	−6.1
Conservative	B. Haley*	1,885	40.9	+9.5
Liberal Democrats	F. Cooper	550	11.9	+3.2
Green	P. Allen	171	3.7	−1.3
Majority		116	2.5	−15.6
Turnout		4,607	48.6	−4.0
Labour gain from Conservative		Swing		

=== East Bramhall ===
East Bramhall
Party	Candidate	Votes	%	±%
Conservative	K. Holt*	3,835	57.4	+5.7
Liberal Democrats	A. Walker	1,911	28.6	+0.9
Labour	E. Symonds	712	10.7	−4.5
Green	M. Suter	221	3.3	−2.1
Majority		1,924	28.8	+4.8
Turnout		6,679	52.3	−1.8
Conservative hold		Swing		

=== Edgeley ===
Edgeley
Party	Candidate	Votes	%	±%
Liberal Democrats	J. Ashworth	2,211	43.7	+5.2
Labour	D. McMillan	2,161	42.7	−7.3
Conservative	S. Kirkham	567	11.2	+2.5
Green	I. Boyd	122	2.4	−0.4
Majority		50	1.0	
Turnout		5,061	51.5	−7.0
Liberal Democrats hold		Swing		

=== Great Moor ===
Great Moor
Party	Candidate	Votes	%	±%
Liberal Democrats	T. E. Pyle*	2,811	47.8	+25.5
Labour	J. Woodrow	1,667	28.4	−19.7
Conservative	J. Stanyer	1,294	22.0	−4.4
Green	G. Hill	104	2.8	−1.4
Majority		1,144	19.4	
Turnout		5,876	54.5	−0.2
Liberal Democrats hold		Swing		

=== Hazel Grove ===
Hazel Grove
Party	Candidate	Votes	%	±%
Liberal Democrats	D. Robinson*	3,067	46.7	+2.2
Conservative	K. Labrey	2,651	40.3	+2.3
Labour	M. Wallis	701	10.7	−3.1
Green	M. Sullivan	154	2.3	−1.5
Majority		416	6.4	−0.1
Turnout		6,573	53.2	−3.4
Liberal Democrats hold		Swing		

=== Heald Green ===
Heald Green
Party	Candidate	Votes	%	±%
Heald Green Ratepayers	N. Fields*	3,358	72.0	+7.2
Conservative	S. Swinglehurst	604	13.0	−0.2
Labour	J. Becker	502	10.8	−6.5
Liberal Democrats	D. Roberts Jones	200	4.3	−0.4
Majority		2,754	59.0	+11.4
Turnout		4,664	45.5	−1.2
Heald Green Ratepayers hold		Swing		

=== Heaton Mersey ===
Heaton Mersey
Party	Candidate	Votes	%	±%
Conservative	L. Jones	2,823	45.0	+6.1
Labour	L. Auger	2,354	37.5	−5.2
Liberal Democrats	G. Bushell	689	11.0	+1.7
Green	D. Carter	407	6.5	−2.6
Majority		469	7.5	
Turnout		6,273	54.2	−0.1
Conservative hold		Swing		

=== Heaton Moor ===
Heaton Moor
Party	Candidate	Votes	%	±%
Conservative	W. Crook*	2,440	51.6	+6.2
Labour	T. Grundy	1,457	30.8	−4.9
Liberal Democrats	S. Beswick	655	13.9	+3.8
Green	G. Leatherbarrow	175	3.7	−5.1
Majority		983	20.8	+11.1
Turnout		4,727	48.0	−2.2
Conservative hold		Swing		

=== Manor ===
Manor
Party	Candidate	Votes	%	±%
Liberal Democrats	A. Corris*	2,662	51.1	+6.1
Labour	I. Jackson	1,878	36.1	−4.9
Conservative	E. Dennis	580	11.1	0
Green	R. Lindsay-Dunn	86	1.7	−1.1
Majority		784	15.0	+11.0
Turnout		5,206	54.6	−2.2
Liberal Democrats hold		Swing		

=== North Marple ===
North Marple
Party	Candidate	Votes	%	±%
Liberal Democrats	B. Harrison*	2,476	51.5	+3.8
Conservative	W. Partington	1,745	36.3	+2.8
Labour	A. Tognarelli	584	12.2	−1.6
Majority		731	15.2	+1.0
Turnout		4,805	51.0	−5.1
Liberal Democrats hold		Swing		

=== North Reddish ===
North Reddish
Party	Candidate	Votes	%	±%
Labour	P. Scott*	2,508	49.3	−27.5
Liberal Democrats	J. Keane	1,984	39.0	+32.5
Conservative	D. Law	596	11.7	−1.6
Majority		524	10.3	−53.2
Turnout		5,088	42.7	−6.5
Labour hold		Swing		

=== Romiley ===
Romiley
Party	Candidate	Votes	%	±%
Liberal Democrats	J. Ingham*	2,573	43.3	+6.6
Conservative	M. Bennett	2,223	37.4	+7.3
Labour	A. Lowe	1,141	19.2	−6.2
Majority		350	5.9	−0.7
Turnout		5,937	52.5	−4.1
Liberal Democrats hold		Swing		

=== South Marple ===
South Marple
Party	Candidate	Votes	%	±%
Liberal Democrats	E. Kime*	2,760	51.2	+3.8
Conservative	G. Cameron	2,088	38.7	+1.5
Labour	M. Moore	383	7.1	−1.1
Green	J. Armstrong	164	3.0	−4.1
Majority		672	12.5	+2.3
Turnout		5,395	54.6	−4.1
Liberal Democrats hold		Swing		

=== South Reddish ===
South Reddish
Party	Candidate	Votes	%	±%
Labour	S. Broadhurst*	2,976	65.9	−7.8
Conservative	S. Mason	953	21.1	+4.4
Liberal Democrats	I. McLean	588	13.0	+3.4
Majority		2,023	44.8	−12.2
Turnout		4,517	41.8	−8.3
Labour hold		Swing		

=== West Bramhall ===
West Bramhall
Party	Candidate	Votes	%	±%
Conservative	A. Law	3,349	56.7	+1.0
Liberal Democrats	P. Calton	2,164	36.6	+5.6
Labour	B. Holland	398	6.7	−3.2
Majority		1,185	20.1	−4.6
Turnout		5,911	51.0	−3.0
Conservative hold		Swing		
