= 1999 Stockport Metropolitan Borough Council election =

Local election in Stockport

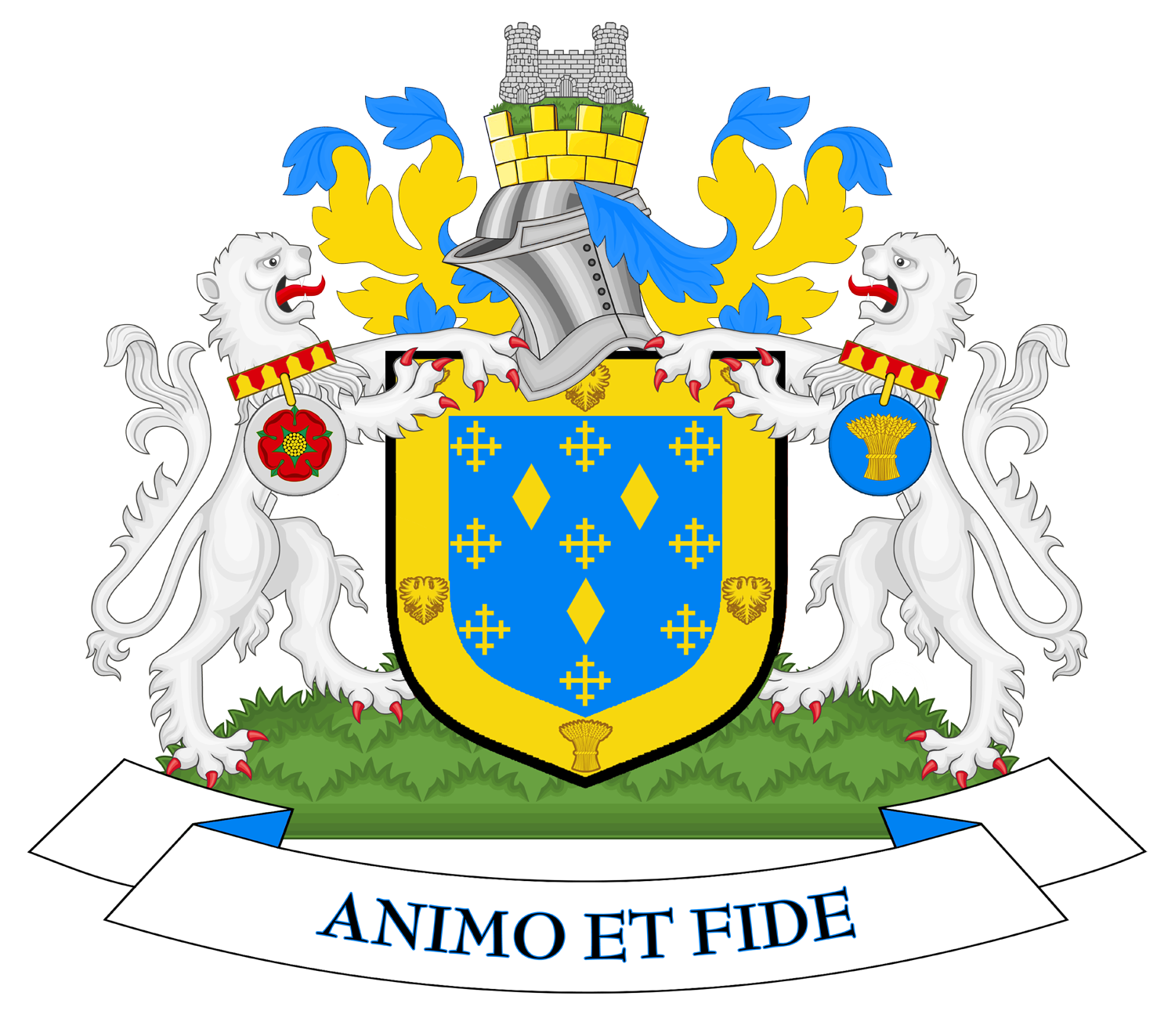
- 6 May 1999

21 of 63 seats to Stockport Metropolitan Borough Council 32 seats needed for a majority
| | First party | Second party | Third party |
|---|---|---|---|
| Leader | Fred Ridley | Tom McGee | Ron Stenson |
| Party | Liberal Democrats | Labour | Heald Green Ratepayers |
| Leader's seat | Cheadle Hulme South | Davenport | Heald Green |
| Last election | 10 seats, 39.0% | 10 seats, 30.0% | 1 seat, 3.8% |
| Seats before | 30 | 26 | 3 |
| Seats won | 11 | 8 | 1 |
| Seats after | 32 | 26 | 3 |
| Seat change | ▲2 | Steady | Steady |
| Popular vote | 26,163 | 18,700 | 2,397 |
| Percentage | 38.5% | 27.6% | 3.5% |
| Swing | ▼0.5% | ▼2.4% | ▼0.3% |
| | Fourth party |
| Leader | Ian Roberts |
| Party | Conservative |
| Leader's seat | Cheadle (defeated) |
| Last election | 1 seat, 26.0% |
| Seats before | 3 |
| Seats won | 1 |
| Seats after | 2 |
| Seat change | ▼1 |
| Popular vote | 18,417 |
| Percentage | 27.1% |
| Swing | ▲1.1% |
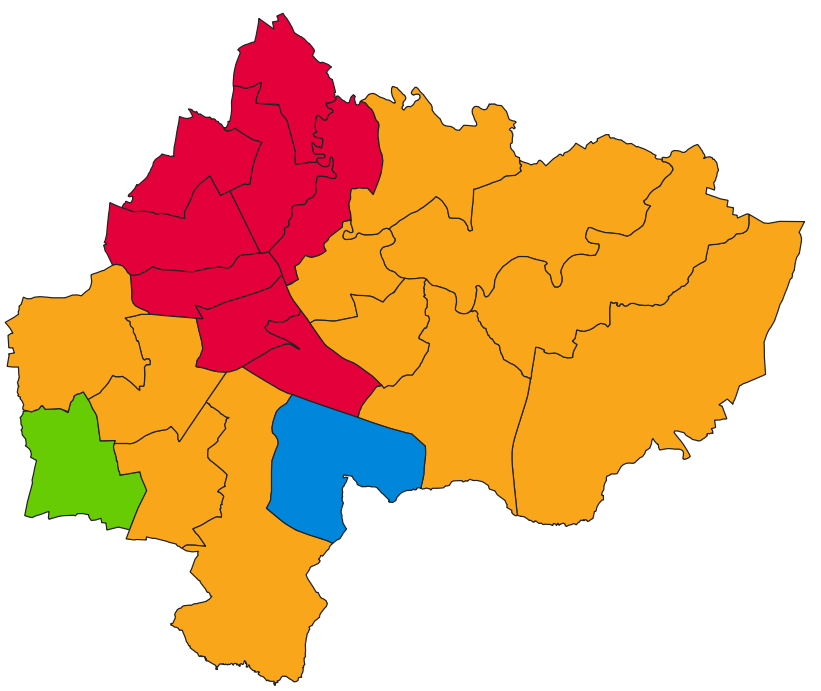
- Map of results of 1999 election
Leader of the Council before election
Fred Ridley
Liberal Democrats
Leader of the Council after election
Fred Ridley
Liberal Democrats

Elections to Stockport Council were held on Thursday, 6 May 1999. One third of the council was up for election, with each successful candidate to serve a four-year term of office, expiring in 2003. The Liberal Democrats gained overall control of the council, from no overall control.

== Election result ==
| Party | Votes | | Seats | | | Full Council | |
| Liberal Democrats | 26,163 (38.5%) | ▼0.5 | 11 (52.4%) | 11 / 21 | ▲2 | 32 (50.8%) | 32 / 63 |
| Labour Party | 18,700 (27.6%) | ▼2.4 | 8 (38.1%) | 8 / 21 | Steady | 26 (41.3%) | 26 / 63 |
| Heald Green Ratepayers | 2,397 (3.5%) | ▼0.3 | 1 (4.8%) | 1 / 21 | Steady | 3 (4.8%) | 3 / 63 |
| Conservative Party | 18,415 (27.1%) | ▲1.1 | 1 (4.8%) | 1 / 21 | ▼1 | 2 (3.2%) | 2 / 63 |
| Independent | 1,468 (2.2%) | ▲1.9 | 0 (0.0%) | 0 / 21 | ▼1 | 0 (0.0%) | 0 / 63 |
| Green Party | 732 (1.1%) | ▲0.3 | 0 (0.0%) | 0 / 21 | Steady | 0 (0.0%) | 0 / 63 |

↓
| 26 | 32 | 3 | 2 |

== Ward results ==
=== Bredbury ===
Bredbury
| Party | Candidate | Votes | % | ±% |
|---|---|---|---|---|
| Liberal Democrats | C. Gordon* | 1,951 | 67.2 | −6.9 |
| Labour | D. Brown | 571 | 19.7 | +3.9 |
| Conservative | W. Law | 381 | 13.1 | +3.0 |
| Majority | | 1,380 | 47.5 | −10.8 |
| Turnout | | 2,903 | 24.8 | −1.9 |
| Liberal Democrats hold | | Swing | | |

=== Brinnington ===
Brinnington
| Party | Candidate | Votes | % | ±% |
|---|---|---|---|---|
| Labour | C. MacAlister* | 1,222 | 81.8 | +2.1 |
| Liberal Democrats | M. Torode | 142 | 9.5 | +1.4 |
| Conservative | B. Hopwood | 129 | 8.7 | +0.8 |
| Majority | | 1,080 | 72.3 | +0.7 |
| Turnout | | 1,493 | 20.6 | −0.4 |
| Labour hold | | Swing | | |

=== Cale Green ===
Cale Green
| Party | Candidate | Votes | % | ±% |
|---|---|---|---|---|
| Labour | J. McGuire* | 1,323 | 70.4 | +1.0 |
| Liberal Democrats | R. Seymour | 326 | 17.4 | −0.9 |
| Conservative | J. Jones | 229 | 12.2 | −0.1 |
| Majority | | 997 | 53.0 | +1.9 |
| Turnout | | 1,878 | 21.0 | +0.1 |
| Labour hold | | Swing | | |

=== Cheadle ===
Cheadle
| Party | Candidate | Votes | % | ±% |
|---|---|---|---|---|
| Liberal Democrats | P. Carter | 2,279 | 55.7 | +1.1 |
| Conservative | I. Roberts* | 1,439 | 35.2 | −1.1 |
| Labour | S. Bennett | 375 | 9.1 | 0 |
| Majority | | 840 | 20.5 | +2.2 |
| Turnout | | 4,093 | 35.6 | 0 |
| Liberal Democrats gain from Conservative | | Swing | | |

=== Cheadle Hulme North ===
Cheadle Hulme North
| Party | Candidate | Votes | % | ±% |
|---|---|---|---|---|
| Liberal Democrats | J. Pantall* | 1,473 | 51.0 | +0.2 |
| Conservative | S. Dey | 823 | 28.4 | +2.9 |
| Labour | P. Diggett | 597 | 20.6 | −3.1 |
| Majority | | 650 | 22.6 | −2.7 |
| Turnout | | 2,893 | 25.3 | −1.7 |
| Liberal Democrats hold | | Swing | | |

=== Cheadle Hulme South ===
Cheadle Hulme South
| Party | Candidate | Votes | % | ±% |
|---|---|---|---|---|
| Liberal Democrats | F. Ridley* | 2,104 | 58.9 | +1.8 |
| Conservative | D. Lawson | 1,082 | 30.3 | −1.6 |
| Labour | R. Cooper | 384 | 10.8 | −0.2 |
| Majority | | 1,022 | 28.6 | +3.4 |
| Turnout | | 3,570 | 32.2 | +1.5 |
| Liberal Democrats hold | | Swing | | |

=== Davenport ===
Davenport
| Party | Candidate | Votes | % | ±% |
|---|---|---|---|---|
| Labour | P. Harding | 1,068 | 41.7 | −12.1 |
| Independent | M. Jones* | 678 | 26.5 | N/A |
| Conservative | M. Kilty | 586 | 22.9 | −9.6 |
| Liberal Democrats | J. Humphreys | 227 | 8.9 | −4.9 |
| Majority | | 390 | 15.2 | −6.2 |
| Turnout | | 2,459 | 28.0 | +2.9 |
| Labour gain from Independent | | Swing | | |

=== East Bramhall ===
East Bramhall
| Party | Candidate | Votes | % | ±% |
|---|---|---|---|---|
| Conservative | K. Holt* | 2,847 | 50.0 | +1.6 |
| Liberal Democrats | B. Millard | 2,405 | 42.3 | +1.2 |
| Labour | P. Hopkins | 348 | 6.1 | −2.5 |
| Green | M. Suter | 89 | 1.6 | −0.3 |
| Majority | | 442 | 7.8 | +0.5 |
| Turnout | | 5,689 | 44.4 | +4.5 |
| Conservative hold | | Swing | | |

=== Edgeley ===
Edgeley
| Party | Candidate | Votes | % | ±% |
|---|---|---|---|---|
| Labour | C. Fielder* | 1,564 | 70.9 | −3.1 |
| Liberal Democrats | D. Roberts-Jones | 359 | 16.3 | −1.1 |
| Conservative | P. Orton | 229 | 10.4 | −1.3 |
| Green | G. Johnson | 53 | 2.4 | −0.9 |
| Majority | | 1,205 | 54.6 | +8.1 |
| Turnout | | 2,205 | 23.8 | −2.9 |
| Labour hold | | Swing | | |

=== Great Moor ===
Great Moor
| Party | Candidate | Votes | % | ±% |
|---|---|---|---|---|
| Liberal Democrats | T. E. Pyle* | 1,837 | 53.8 | −6.0 |
| Labour | K. Brookes | 708 | 20.7 | −4.7 |
| Independent | K. Ralphs | 466 | 13.7 | N/A |
| Conservative | K. Gibbons | 348 | 10.2 | −4.6 |
| Green | K. Pease | 54 | 1.6 | N/A |
| Majority | | 1,129 | 33.1 | −1.3 |
| Turnout | | 3,413 | 32.4 | −0.2 |
| Liberal Democrats hold | | Swing | | |

=== Hazel Grove ===
Hazel Grove
| Party | Candidate | Votes | % | ±% |
|---|---|---|---|---|
| Liberal Democrats | C. Corris* | 2,198 | 57.1 | +1.1 |
| Conservative | T. Dunstan | 1,237 | 32.1 | −3.6 |
| Labour | K. Vickers | 413 | 10.8 | +2.5 |
| Majority | | 961 | 25.0 | +4.7 |
| Turnout | | 3,848 | 31.3 | −2.7 |
| Liberal Democrats hold | | Swing | | |

=== Heald Green ===
Heald Green
| Party | Candidate | Votes | % | ±% |
|---|---|---|---|---|
| Heald Green Ratepayers | D. Whitehead | 2,397 | 77.1 | −5.4 |
| Conservative | K. Bullman | 266 | 8.6 | +2.6 |
| Labour | D. Heywood | 247 | 7.9 | +1.3 |
| Liberal Democrats | J. Porgess | 200 | 6.4 | +2.5 |
| Majority | | 2,131 | 68.5 | −7.4 |
| Turnout | | 3,110 | 30.4 | −0.4 |
| Heald Green Ratepayers hold | | Swing | | |

=== Heaton Mersey ===
Heaton Mersey
| Party | Candidate | Votes | % | ±% |
|---|---|---|---|---|
| Labour | P. Lanigan* | 2,131 | 56.1 | −2.3 |
| Conservative | E. Dennis | 1,137 | 29.9 | +1.6 |
| Liberal Democrats | H. Thompson | 373 | 9.8 | −0.4 |
| Green | M. Sullivan | 159 | 4.2 | +1.1 |
| Majority | | 994 | 26.2 | −3.9 |
| Turnout | | 3,800 | 31.8 | +2.0 |
| Labour hold | | Swing | | |

=== Heaton Moor ===
Heaton Moor
| Party | Candidate | Votes | % | ±% |
|---|---|---|---|---|
| Labour | H. Nance | 1,645 | 45.0 | +1.4 |
| Conservative | L. Jones | 1,642 | 44.9 | +3.7 |
| Liberal Democrats | D. Matthews | 272 | 7.4 | −4.7 |
| Green | J. Cuff | 100 | 2.7 | −0.4 |
| Majority | | 3 | 0.1 | −2.3 |
| Turnout | | 3,659 | 36.9 | +3.7 |
| Labour hold | | Swing | | |

=== Manor ===
Manor
| Party | Candidate | Votes | % | ±% |
|---|---|---|---|---|
| Liberal Democrats | S. Derbyshire | 1,673 | 48.8 | +7.5 |
| Labour | P. Wharton* | 1,542 | 45.0 | −6.0 |
| Conservative | J. Leck | 161 | 4.7 | −1.0 |
| Green | R. Lindsay-Dunn | 53 | 1.5 | −0.5 |
| Majority | | 131 | 3.8 | |
| Turnout | | 3,429 | 36.7 | +0.6 |
| Liberal Democrats gain from Labour | | Swing | | |

=== North Marple ===
North Marple
| Party | Candidate | Votes | % | ±% |
|---|---|---|---|---|
| Liberal Democrats | B. Harrison* | 1,913 | 62.5 | −0.1 |
| Conservative | G. Hopwood | 652 | 21.3 | +2.4 |
| Labour | S. Townsend | 347 | 11.3 | −0.1 |
| Independent | J. Tyers | 147 | 4.9 | −2.2 |
| Majority | | 1,261 | 41.2 | −2.5 |
| Turnout | | 3,059 | 32.4 | −0.5 |
| Liberal Democrats hold | | Swing | | |

=== North Reddish ===
North Reddish
| Party | Candidate | Votes | % | ±% |
|---|---|---|---|---|
| Labour | P. Scott | 1,613 | 73.0 | −4.4 |
| Conservative | C. Wilson | 328 | 14.8 | +2.4 |
| Liberal Democrats | R. Driver | 270 | 12.2 | +2.0 |
| Majority | | 1,285 | 58.2 | −6.8 |
| Turnout | | 2,211 | 18.8 | +0.6 |
| Labour hold | | Swing | | |

=== Romiley ===
Romiley
| Party | Candidate | Votes | % | ±% |
|---|---|---|---|---|
| Liberal Democrats | M. Loftus | 1,677 | 54.0 | −3.2 |
| Conservative | G. Jones | 859 | 27.7 | +0.1 |
| Labour | J. Humphries | 471 | 15.2 | +2.8 |
| Green | G. Reid | 99 | 3.1 | +0.3 |
| Majority | | 818 | 26.3 | −1.3 |
| Turnout | | 3,106 | 28.3 | +0.3 |
| Liberal Democrats hold | | Swing | | |

=== South Marple ===
South Marple
| Party | Candidate | Votes | % | ±% |
|---|---|---|---|---|
| Liberal Democrats | D. Brailsford | 1,872 | 51.4 | −2.4 |
| Conservative | D. Law | 1,449 | 39.8 | +1.3 |
| Labour | M. Duerdoth | 194 | 5.3 | −2.4 |
| Green | A. Riddell | 125 | 3.5 | N/A |
| Majority | | 423 | 11.6 | −3.7 |
| Turnout | | 3,640 | 37.7 | +2.7 |
| Liberal Democrats hold | | Swing | | |

=== South Reddish ===
South Reddish
| Party | Candidate | Votes | % | ±% |
|---|---|---|---|---|
| Labour | J. Kidd | 1,658 | 68.0 | −2.6 |
| Liberal Democrats | I. McLean | 307 | 12.6 | −3.6 |
| Conservative | S. Burt | 298 | 12.2 | −1.0 |
| Independent | G. Price | 177 | 7.2 | N/A |
| Majority | | 1,351 | 55.4 | +1.0 |
| Turnout | | 2,440 | 22.6 | +2.3 |
| Labour hold | | Swing | | |

=== West Bramhall ===
West Bramhall
| Party | Candidate | Votes | % | ±% |
|---|---|---|---|---|
| Liberal Democrats | A. Smith* | 2,305 | 47.3 | −3.9 |
| Conservative | P. Bellis | 2,293 | 47.0 | +2.3 |
| Labour | G. Smith | 279 | 5.7 | +1.6 |
| Majority | | 12 | 0.3 | −6.2 |
| Turnout | | 4,877 | 46.4 | +7.2 |
| Liberal Democrats hold | | Swing | | |
