= 1998 Stockport Metropolitan Borough Council election =

Local election in Stockport

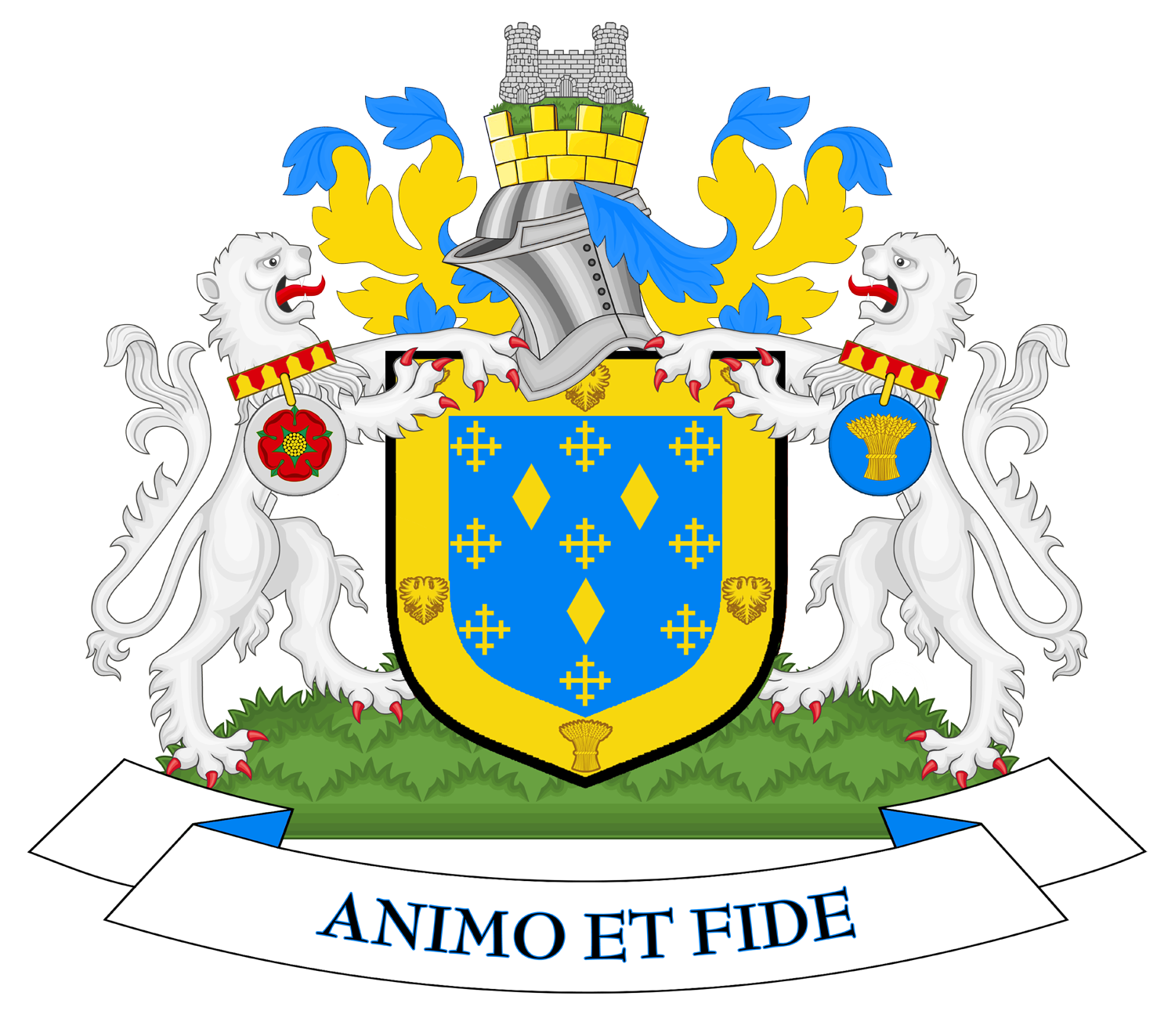
- 7 May 1998

22 of 63 seats to Stockport Metropolitan Borough Council 32 seats needed for a majority
	First party	Second party	Third party
Leader	Fred Ridley	Colin MacAlister	Ian Roberts
Party	Liberal Democrats	Labour	Conservative
Leader's seat	Cheadle Hulme South	Brinnington	Cheadle
Last election	11 seats, 38.6%	9 seats, 34.5%	0 seats, 22.6%
Seats before	31	27	2
Seats won	10	10	1
Seats after	30	27	3
Seat change	▼1	Steady	▲1
Popular vote	26,877	20,678	17,898
Percentage	39.0%	30.0%	26.0%
Swing	▲0.4%	▼4.5%	▲3.4%
	Fourth party
Leader	Ron Stenson
Party	Heald Green Ratepayers
Leader's seat	Heald Green
Last election	1 seat, 3.0%
Seats before	3
Seats won	1
Seats after	3
Seat change	Steady
Popular vote	2,603
Percentage	3.8%
Swing	▲0.8%
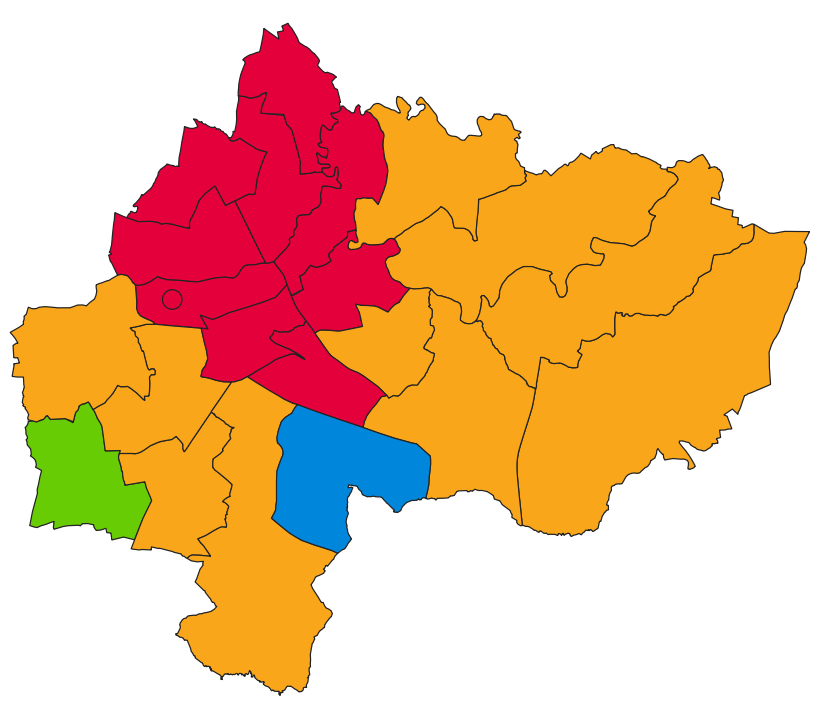
- Map of results of 1998 election
Leader of the Council before election
Fred Ridley
Liberal Democrats
Leader of the Council after election
Fred Ridley
Liberal Democrats

Elections to Stockport Council were held on Thursday, 7 May 1998. One third of the council was up for election, with each successful candidate to serve a four-year term of office, expiring in 2002. The council remained under no overall control.

== Election result ==
Party	Votes		Seats			Full Council	
Liberal Democrats	26,877 (39.0%)	▲0.4	10 (45.5%)	10 / 22	▼1	30 (47.6%)	30 / 63
Labour Party	20,678 (30.0%)	▼4.5	10 (45.5%)	10 / 22	Steady	27 (42.9%)	27 / 63
Conservative Party	17,898 (26.0%)	▲3.4	1 (4.5%)	1 / 22	▲1	3 (4.8%)	3 / 63
Heald Green Ratepayers	2,603 (3.8%)	▲0.8	1 (4.5%)	1 / 22	Steady	3 (4.8%)	3 / 63
Green Party	545 (0.8%)	▼0.2	0 (0.0%)	0 / 22	Steady	0 (0.0%)	0 / 63
Independent	220 (0.3%)	Steady	0 (0.0%)	0 / 22	Steady	0 (0.0%)	0 / 63
Socialist Labour	68 (0.1%)	N/A	0 (0.0%)	0 / 22	N/A	0 (0.0%)	0 / 63

↓
27	30	3	3

== Ward results ==
=== Bredbury ===
Bredbury
Party	Candidate	Votes	%	±%
Liberal Democrats	D. Humphries*	2,311	74.1	+19.8
Labour	D. Brown	493	15.8	−13.9
Conservative	I. Hirst	314	10.1	−5.9
Majority		1,818	58.3	+33.7
Turnout		3,118	26.7	−6.5
Liberal Democrats hold		Swing		

=== Brinnington ===
Brinnington
Party	Candidate	Votes	%	±%
Labour	C. Murphy	1,227	79.7	−8.0
Liberal Democrats	M. Torode	124	8.1	−4.2
Conservative	B. Hopwood	121	7.9	N/A
Socialist Labour	G. Thorne	68	4.4	N/A
Majority		1,103	71.6	−3.8
Turnout		1,540	21.0	−8.6
Labour hold		Swing		

=== Cale Green ===
Cale Green
Party	Candidate	Votes	%	±%
Labour	J. Mone*	1,302	69.4	−3.8
Liberal Democrats	R. Seymour	343	18.3	−8.5
Conservative	J. Jones	231	12.3	N/A
Majority		959	51.1	+4.7
Turnout		1,876	20.9	−12.8
Labour hold		Swing		

=== Cheadle ===
Cheadle
Party	Candidate	Votes	%	±%
Liberal Democrats	C. Seeley	2,223	54.6	+8.4
Conservative	J. Needham	1,476	36.3	−2.4
Labour	S. Bennett	371	9.1	−6.0
Majority		747	18.3	+10.8
Turnout		4,070	35.6	−2.1
Liberal Democrats hold		Swing		

=== Cheadle Hulme North ===
Cheadle Hulme North
Party	Candidate	Votes	%	±%
Liberal Democrats	D. Talbot	1,576	50.8	+0.3
Conservative	R. Stevenson	792	25.5	+6.6
Labour	P. Diggett	734	23.7	−6.9
Majority		784	25.3	+5.4
Turnout		3,102	27.0	−11.0
Liberal Democrats hold		Swing		

=== Cheadle Hulme South ===
Cheadle Hulme South
Party	Candidate	Votes	%	±%
Liberal Democrats	I. Shaw*	1,957	57.1	−1.2
Conservative	D. Khan	1,094	31.9	+2.0
Labour	R. Cooper	377	11.0	−0.8
Majority		863	25.2	−3.2
Turnout		3,428	30.7	−7.7
Liberal Democrats hold		Swing		

=== Davenport ===
Davenport
Party	Candidate	Votes	%	±%
Labour	T. McGee*	1,237	53.8	−1.2
Conservative	K. McKenna	745	32.4	+5.5
Liberal Democrats	J. Jones	319	13.8	−1.4
Majority		492	21.4	−6.7
Turnout		2,301	25.1	−11.4
Labour hold		Swing		

=== East Bramhall ===
East Bramhall
Party	Candidate	Votes	%	±%
Conservative	A. Johnson	2,479	48.4	+5.3
Liberal Democrats	B. Millard*	2,103	41.1	−2.4
Labour	K. Vickers	440	8.6	−2.7
Green	M. Suter	95	1.9	−0.3
Majority		376	7.3	
Turnout		5,117	39.9	−4.1
Conservative gain from Liberal Democrats		Swing		

=== Edgeley ===
Edgeley (2 vacancies)
Party	Candidate	Votes	%	±%
Labour	S. Bailey*	2,530	74.0	−0.1
Labour	J. Siddelley	1,591	63.9	−10.2
Liberal Democrats	K. Fletcher	433	17.4	−5.2
Liberal Democrats	D. Roberts-Jones	349	14.0	−8.6
Conservative	M. Kilty	290	11.7	N/A
Conservative	G. Hopwood	276	11.1	N/A
Green	G. Johnson	81	3.3	−0.1
Majority		1,158	46.5	−5.0
Turnout		2,488	26.7	−10.1
Labour hold		Swing		
Labour hold		Swing		

=== Great Moor ===
Great Moor
Party	Candidate	Votes	%	±%
Liberal Democrats	A. Stunell*	2,071	59.8	+8.2
Labour	K. Brookes	882	25.4	−6.6
Conservative	B. Haley	511	14.8	−1.6
Majority		1,189	34.4	+14.8
Turnout		3,464	32.6	−6.9
Liberal Democrats hold		Swing		

=== Hazel Grove ===
Hazel Grove
Party	Candidate	Votes	%	±%
Liberal Democrats	K. Hogg*	2,326	56.0	+3.5
Conservative	T. Dunstan	1,482	35.7	−0.3
Labour	D. Heywood	345	8.3	−3.2
Majority		844	20.3	+3.8
Turnout		4,153	34.0	−8.4
Liberal Democrats hold		Swing		

=== Heald Green ===
Heald Green
Party	Candidate	Votes	%	±%
Heald Green Ratepayers	P. Burns*	2,603	82.5	+12.4
Labour	P. McCormack	208	6.6	−7.4
Conservative	P. Orton	190	6.0	−2.3
Liberal Democrats	J. Porgess	153	4.9	−2.6
Majority		2,395	75.9	+19.8
Turnout		3,154	30.8	−3.0
Heald Green Ratepayers hold		Swing		

=== Heaton Mersey ===
Heaton Mersey
Party	Candidate	Votes	%	±%
Labour	C. Foster*	2,076	58.4	+0.3
Conservative	E. Dennis	1,006	28.3	−3.6
Liberal Democrats	H. Thompson	362	10.2	+2.8
Green	M. Sullivan	112	3.1	+0.5
Majority		1,070	30.1	+3.9
Turnout		3,556	29.8	−11.3
Labour hold		Swing		

=== Heaton Moor ===
Heaton Moor
Party	Candidate	Votes	%	±%
Labour	K. Rocks	1,444	43.6	−2.4
Conservative	L. Jones	1,366	41.2	+5.0
Liberal Democrats	D. Matthews	401	12.1	−2.7
Green	J. Cuff	103	3.1	+0.1
Majority		78	2.4	−7.4
Turnout		3,314	33.2	−7.7
Labour hold		Swing		

=== Manor ===
Manor
Party	Candidate	Votes	%	±%
Labour	M. Miller*	1,721	51.0	−1.2
Liberal Democrats	S. Derbyshire	1,395	41.3	+1.3
Conservative	J. Leck	193	5.7	−0.6
Green	R. Lindsay-Dunn	67	2.0	+0.5
Majority		326	9.7	−2.5
Turnout		3,376	36.1	−2.3
Labour hold		Swing		

=== North Marple ===
North Marple
Party	Candidate	Votes	%	±%
Liberal Democrats	M. Candler*	1,947	62.6	+1.9
Conservative	W. Law	589	18.9	0
Labour	S. Townsend	354	11.4	−2.9
Independent	J. Tyers	220	7.1	+1.0
Majority		1,358	43.7	+1.9
Turnout		3,110	32.9	−6.9
Liberal Democrats hold		Swing		

=== North Reddish ===
North Reddish
Party	Candidate	Votes	%	±%
Labour	A. Graham*	1,657	77.4	−3.2
Conservative	K. Gibbons	266	12.4	N/A
Liberal Democrats	R. Driver	217	10.2	−9.2
Majority		1,391	65.0	+3.7
Turnout		2,140	18.2	−5.5
Labour hold		Swing		

=== Romiley ===
Romiley
Party	Candidate	Votes	%	±%
Liberal Democrats	M. McLay	1,758	57.2	+5.3
Conservative	G. Jones	848	27.6	−1.5
Labour	A. Garside	380	12.4	−4.6
Green	G. Reid	87	2.8	+0.7
Majority		910	27.6	+6.8
Turnout		3,073	28.0	−11.4
Liberal Democrats hold		Swing		

=== South Marple ===
South Marple
Party	Candidate	Votes	%	±%
Liberal Democrats	S. Alexander	1,837	53.8	−6.1
Conservative	D. Law	1,315	38.5	+10.4
Labour	J. Humphries	260	7.7	−1.7
Majority		522	15.3	−16.5
Turnout		3,412	35.0	−5.3
Liberal Democrats hold		Swing		

=== South Reddish ===
South Reddish
Party	Candidate	Votes	%	±%
Labour	D. Goddard*	1,551	70.6	−7.6
Liberal Democrats	I. McLean	355	16.2	−5.6
Conservative	S. Burt	291	13.2	N/A
Majority		1,196	54.4	−2.0
Turnout		2,197	20.3	−8.9
Labour hold		Swing		

=== West Bramhall ===
West Bramhall
Party	Candidate	Votes	%	±%
Liberal Democrats	P. Calton*	2,317	51.2	−2.8
Conservative	P. Bellis	2,023	44.7	+7.2
Labour	P. Hopkins	188	4.1	−4.5
Majority		294	6.5	−10.0
Turnout		4,528	39.2	−3.3
Liberal Democrats hold		Swing		
