= 1994 Stockport Metropolitan Borough Council election =

Local election in Stockport

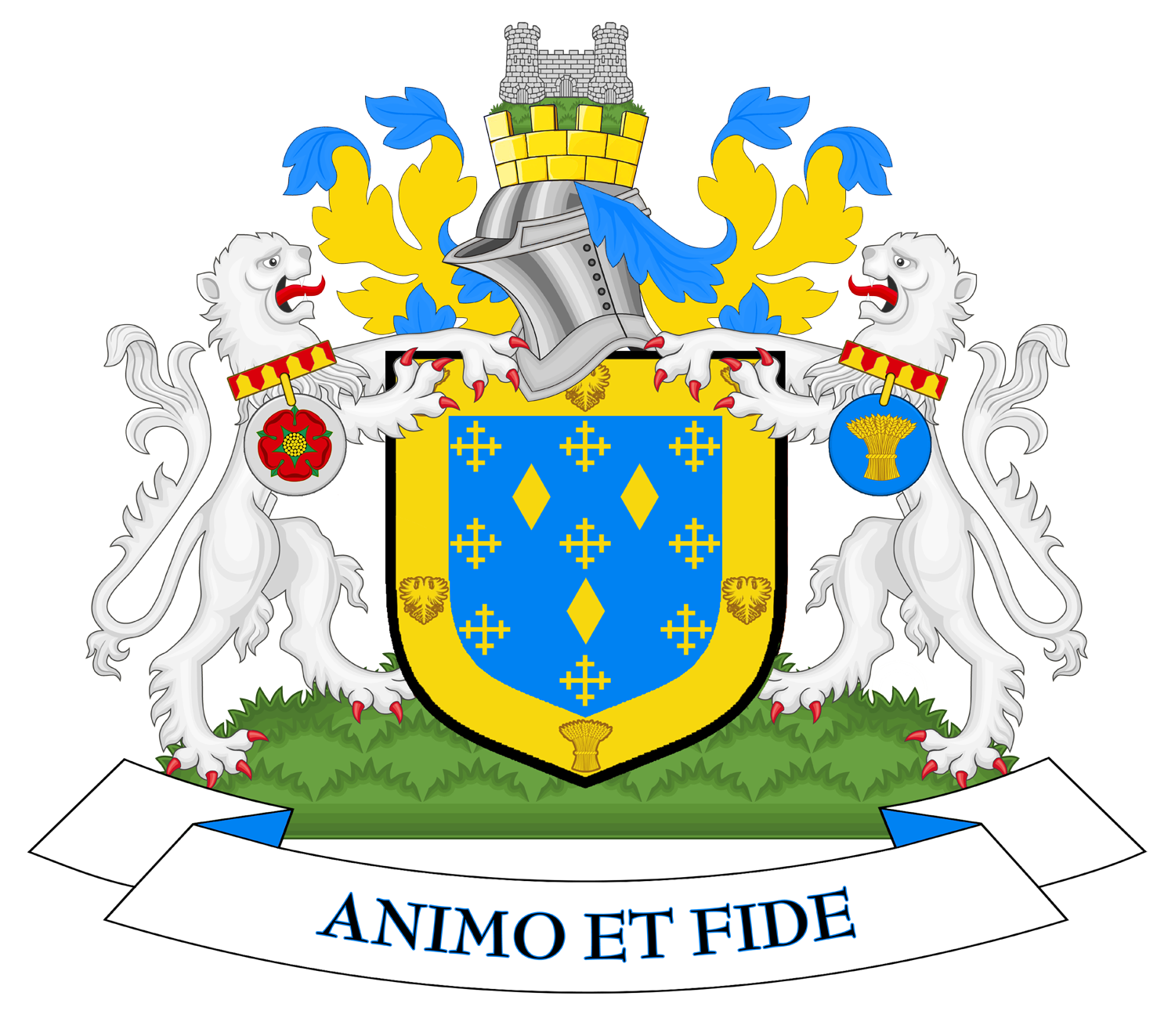
← 1992	5 May 1994	1995 →

22 of 63 seats to Stockport Metropolitan Borough Council 32 seats needed for a majority
	First party	Second party	Third party
Leader	Fred Ridley	Colin MacAlister	John Needham
Party	Liberal Democrats	Labour	Conservative
Leader's seat	Cheadle Hulme South	Brinnington	Cheadle (defeated)
Last election	7 seats, 33.7%	5 seats, 22.2%	8 seats, 39.9%
Seats before	26	17	17
Seats won	12	9	0
Seats after	29	18	13
Seat change	▲3	▲1	▼4
Popular vote	46,977	30,876	24,906
Percentage	43.9%	28.9%	23.3%
Swing	▲10.2%	▲6.7%	▼16.6%
	Fourth party
Leader	Ron Stenson
Party	Heald Green Ratepayers
Leader's seat	Heald Green
Last election	1 seat, 3.3%
Seats before	3
Seats won	1
Seats after	3
Seat change	Steady
Popular vote	3,240
Percentage	3.0%
Swing	▼0.3%
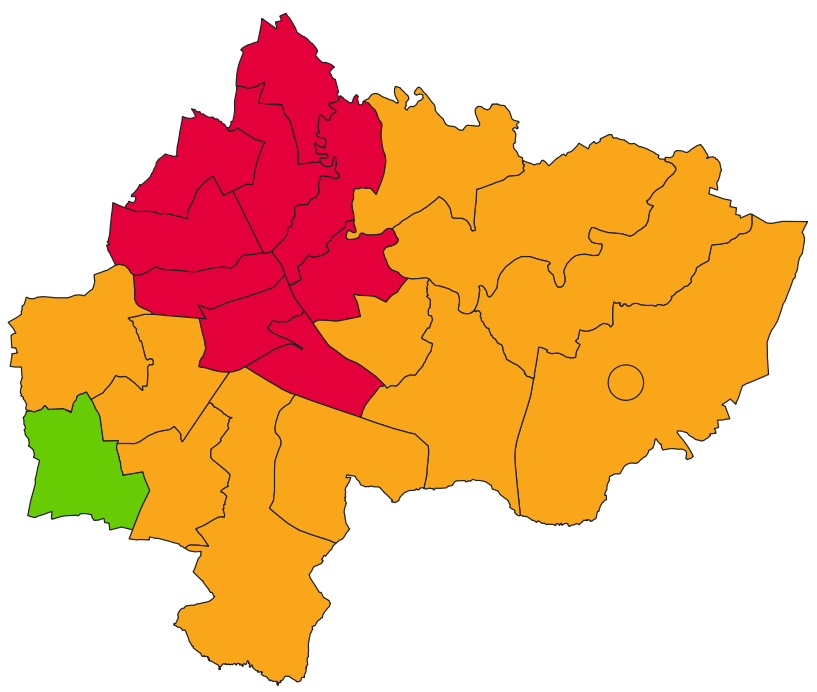
- Map of results of 1994 election
Leader of the Council before election
No leader
No overall control
Leader of the Council after election
No leader
No overall control

Elections to Stockport Council were held on Thursday, 5 May 1994. One third of the council was up for election, with each successful candidate to serve a four-year term of office, expiring in 1998. The council remained under no overall control.

== Election result ==
Party	Votes		Seats			Full Council	
Liberal Democrats	46,977 (43.9%)	▲10.2	12 (54.5%)	12 / 22	▲3	29 (46.0%)	29 / 63
Labour Party	30,876 (28.9%)	▲6.7	9 (40.9%)	9 / 22	▲1	18 (28.6%)	18 / 63
Conservative Party	24,906 (23.3%)	▼16.6	0 (0.0%)	0 / 22	▼4	13 (20.6%)	13 / 63
Heald Green Ratepayers	3,240 (3.0%)	▼0.3	1 (4.5%)	1 / 22	Steady	3 (4.8%)	3 / 63
Green Party	961 (0.9%)	▼0.1	0 (0.0%)	0 / 22	Steady	0 (0.0%)	0 / 63

↓
18	29	3	13

== Ward results ==
=== Bredbury ===
Bredbury
Party	Candidate	Votes	%	±%
Liberal Democrats	D. Humphries*	3,240	66.1	+11.2
Labour	J. McGuire	915	18.7	+1.4
Conservative	M. Gibbons	748	15.3	−12.5
Majority		2,325	47.4	+20.3
Turnout		4,903	42.5	+5.5
Liberal Democrats hold		Swing		

=== Brinnington ===
Brinnington
Party	Candidate	Votes	%	±%
Labour	E. Gallacher*	2,398	80.4	+1.5
Liberal Democrats	H. Austin	381	12.8	+5.6
Conservative	P. Gresty	204	6.8	−4.8
Majority		2,017	67.6	+0.3
Turnout		2,983	38.6	+6.2
Labour hold		Swing		

=== Cale Green ===
Cale Green
Party	Candidate	Votes	%	±%
Labour	J. Mone	2,103	55.0	+14.6
Liberal Democrats	J. Jones	1,444	37.8	−4.1
Conservative	G. McKelvie	275	7.2	−8.5
Majority		659	17.2	
Turnout		3,822	43.2	+6.5
Labour hold		Swing		

=== Cheadle ===
Cheadle
Party	Candidate	Votes	%	±%
Liberal Democrats	C. Seeley	2,340	47.2	+23.5
Conservative	J. Needham*	1,953	39.4	−27.2
Labour	A. Kellett	668	13.5	+3.9
Majority		387	7.8	
Turnout		4,961	44.4	+6.6
Liberal Democrats gain from Conservative		Swing		

=== Cheadle Hulme North ===
Cheadle Hulme North
Party	Candidate	Votes	%	±%
Liberal Democrats	K. Anstis*	2,841	59.4	+10.3
Conservative	A. Johnson	1,089	22.8	−16.9
Labour	D. White	849	17.8	+6.6
Majority		1,752	36.6	+27.2
Turnout		4,779	41.4	+6.7
Liberal Democrats hold		Swing		

=== Cheadle Hulme South ===
Cheadle Hulme South
Party	Candidate	Votes	%	±%
Liberal Democrats	I. Shaw*	3,116	60.2	+7.1
Conservative	P. Bellis	1,534	29.7	−13.6
Labour	B. Holland	522	10.1	+6.5
Majority		1,582	30.5	+20.7
Turnout		5,172	46.7	−0.1
Liberal Democrats hold		Swing		

=== Davenport ===
Davenport
Party	Candidate	Votes	%	±%
Labour	T. McGee*	2,276	52.8	+15.6
Conservative	B. Haley	1,197	27.8	−23.5
Liberal Democrats	H. Lees	835	19.4	+9.9
Majority		1,079	25.0	
Turnout		4,308	46.5	+1.8
Labour hold		Swing		

=== East Bramhall ===
East Bramhall
Party	Candidate	Votes	%	±%
Liberal Democrats	B. Millard	2,524	43.5	+16.0
Conservative	A. Doherty*	2,399	41.4	−22.6
Labour	M. McNamee	697	12.0	+5.8
Green	M. Suter	177	3.1	+0.8
Majority		125	2.1	
Turnout		5,797	45.0	+1.6
Liberal Democrats gain from Conservative		Swing		

=== Edgeley ===
Edgeley
Party	Candidate	Votes	%	±%
Labour	S. Bailey*	2,394	51.4	+7.1
Liberal Democrats	F. Davenport	1,902	40.8	+1.7
Conservative	D. Law	287	6.2	−8.2
Green	G. Johnson	74	1.6	−0.5
Majority		492	10.6	+5.4
Turnout		4,657	49.2	+7.5
Labour hold		Swing		

=== Great Moor ===
Great Moor
Party	Candidate	Votes	%	±%
Liberal Democrats	R. A. Stunell	2,962	53.5	+12.6
Labour	P. Wharton*	1,701	30.7	+5.4
Conservative	A. Hickson	872	15.8	−17.9
Majority		1,261	22.8	+15.6
Turnout		5,535	51.5	+7.2
Liberal Democrats gain from Labour		Swing		

=== Hazel Grove ===
Hazel Grove
Party	Candidate	Votes	%	±%
Liberal Democrats	K. Hogg*	3,762	61.1	+18.5
Conservative	K. Labrey	1,718	27.9	−22.5
Labour	M. Wallis	680	11.0	+4.0
Majority		2,044	33.2	
Turnout		6,160	50.6	+1.4
Liberal Democrats hold		Swing		

=== Heald Green ===
Heald Green
Party	Candidate	Votes	%	±%
Heald Green Ratepayers	P. Burns*	3,240	74.9	−3.2
Labour	J. Becker	512	11.8	+5.1
Conservative	S. Swinglehurst	322	7.4	−4.5
Liberal Democrats	D. Roberts Jones	250	5.8	+2.5
Majority		2,728	63.1	−3.1
Turnout		4,324	42.8	+4.7
Heald Green Ratepayers hold		Swing		

=== Heaton Mersey ===
Heaton Mersey
Party	Candidate	Votes	%	±%
Labour	C. Foster*	3,243	54.5	+19.0
Conservative	P. Reed	1,677	28.2	−23.8
Liberal Democrats	C. Douglas	886	14.9	+7.2
Green	M. Sullivan	146	2.5	−2.2
Majority		1,566	26.3	
Turnout		5,952	50.9	+4.8
Labour hold		Swing		

=== Heaton Moor ===
Heaton Moor
Party	Candidate	Votes	%	±%
Labour	H. Nance	1,963	43.0	+16.8
Conservative	J. Lloyd*	1,544	33.8	−24.3
Liberal Democrats	K. Crauford	953	20.9	+7.0
Green	I. Lindsay-Dunn	105	2.3	+0.5
Majority		419	9.2	
Turnout		4,565	46.9	+4.5
Labour gain from Conservative		Swing		

=== Manor ===
Manor
Party	Candidate	Votes	%	±%
Labour	M. Miller	2,096	45.6	+5.1
Liberal Democrats	M. Torode	2,033	44.2	+4.8
Conservative	J. Horswell	364	7.9	−10.6
Green	R. Lindsay-Dunn	107	2.3	+0.8
Majority		63	1.4	+0.3
Turnout		4,600	48.7	+7.8
Labour gain from Liberal Democrats		Swing		

=== North Marple ===
North Marple
Party	Candidate	Votes	%	±%
Liberal Democrats	M. Candler	2,994	64.5	+14.5
Conservative	P. Smith	1,114	24.0	−18.5
Labour	S. Townsend	532	11.5	+4.0
Majority		1,880	30.5	+33.0
Turnout		4,640	49.3	+2.4
Liberal Democrats hold		Swing		

=== North Reddish ===
North Reddish
Party	Candidate	Votes	%	±%
Labour	A. Graham*	3,127	74.5	+24.3
Liberal Democrats	M. Colbridge	659	15.7	−18.5
Conservative	S. Frost	411	9.8	−3.9
Majority		2,468	58.8	+42.8
Turnout		4,197	35.2	+3.5
Labour hold		Swing		

=== Romiley ===
Romiley
Party	Candidate	Votes	%	±%
Liberal Democrats	N. Wilson*	3,050	60.7	+17.6
Conservative	P. Orton	1,040	20.7	−26.1
Labour	D. Brown	794	15.8	+5.8
Green	G. Reid	138	2.7	N/A
Majority		2,010	40.0	
Turnout		5,022	45.6	+2.4
Liberal Democrats hold		Swing		

=== South Marple ===
South Marple (2 vacancies)
Party	Candidate	Votes	%	±%
Liberal Democrats	D. Brailsford	3,148	61.0	+12.0
Liberal Democrats	A. Taylor	2,999	58.1	+9.1
Conservative	G. Mottram	1,779	34.5	−12.4
Conservative	G. Cameron	1,567	30.4	−16.5
Labour	H. Abrams	339	6.5	+2.5
Labour	S. Vergo	285	5.5	+1.5
Green	A. Riddell	214	4.1	N/A
Majority		1,220	23.6	+21.5
Turnout		5,161	52.7	−0.2
Liberal Democrats hold		Swing		
Liberal Democrats hold		Swing		

=== South Reddish ===
South Reddish
Party	Candidate	Votes	%	±%
Labour	D. Goddard*	2,476	60.0	−1.1
Liberal Democrats	I. McLean	1,182	28.6	+17.4
Conservative	J. Frost	468	11.4	−16.4
Majority		1,294	31.4	−2.0
Turnout		4,126	38.5	+7.4
Labour hold		Swing		

=== West Bramhall ===
West Bramhall
Party	Candidate	Votes	%	±%
Liberal Democrats	P. Calton	3,476	56.7	+14.5
Conservative	J. B. Leck*	2,344	38.3	−16.2
Labour	S. Bennett	306	5.0	+1.7
Majority		1,132	18.4	
Turnout		6,126	52.9	+5.0
Liberal Democrats gain from Conservative		Swing		
