= 1992 Stockport Metropolitan Borough Council election =

Local election in Stockport

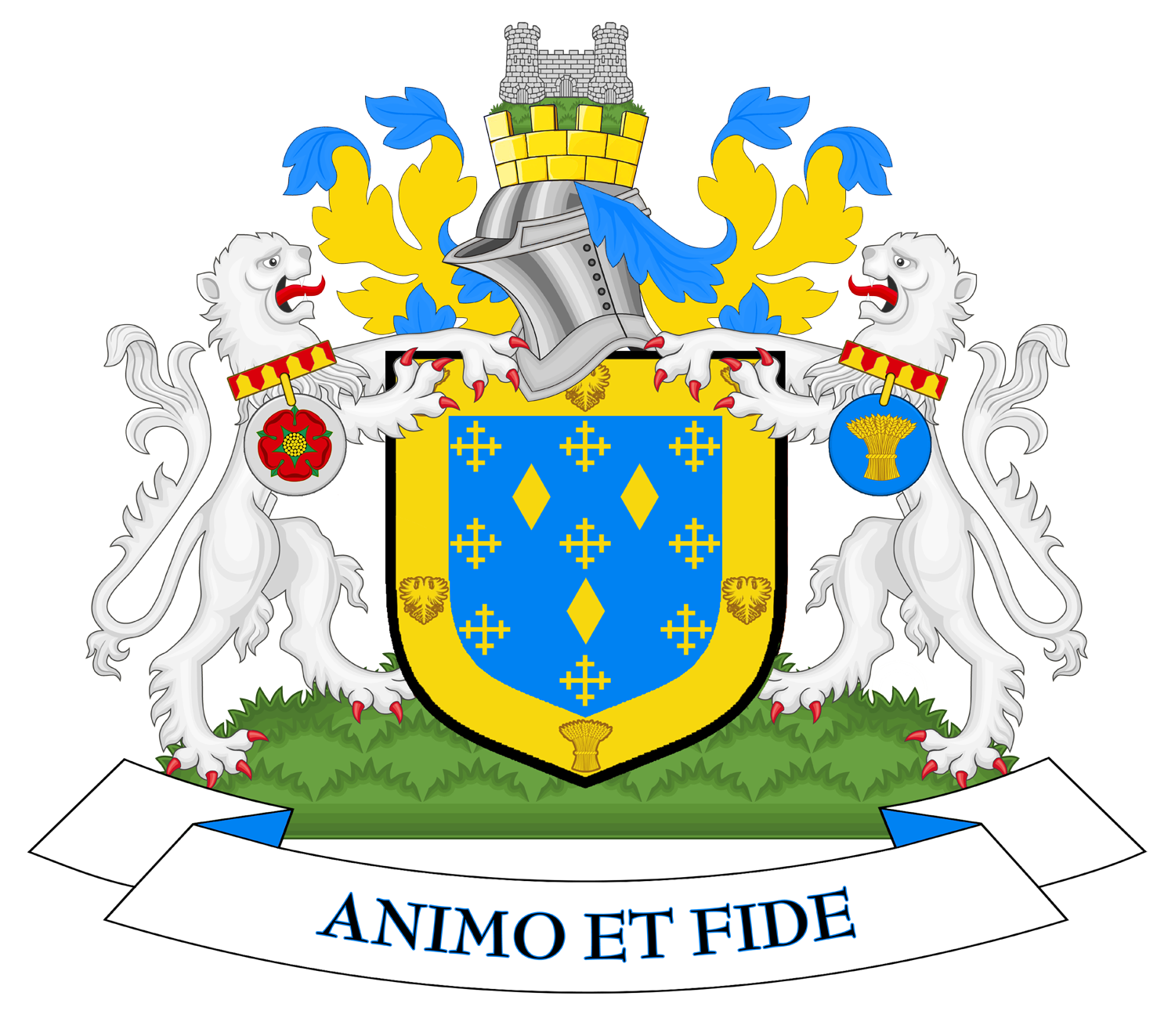
← 1991	7 May 1992	1994 →

21 of 63 seats to Stockport Metropolitan Borough Council 32 seats needed for a majority
	First party	Second party	Third party
Leader	Eric Kime	John Needham	Ann Coffey
Party	Liberal Democrats	Conservative	Labour
Leader's seat	South Marple	Cheadle	South Reddish
Last election	11 seats, 36.3%	5 seats, 32.4%	4 seats, 26.5%
Seats before	26	17	17
Seats won	7	8	5
Seats after	26	17	17
Seat change	Steady	Steady	Steady
Popular vote	31,003	36,618	20,353
Percentage	33.7%	39.9%	22.2%
Swing	▼2.6%	▲7.5%	▼4.3%
	Fourth party
Leader	Ron Stenson
Party	Heald Green Ratepayers
Leader's seat	Heald Green
Last election	1 seat, 3.0%
Seats before	3
Seats won	1
Seats after	3
Seat change	Steady
Popular vote	3,021
Percentage	3.3%
Swing	▲0.3%
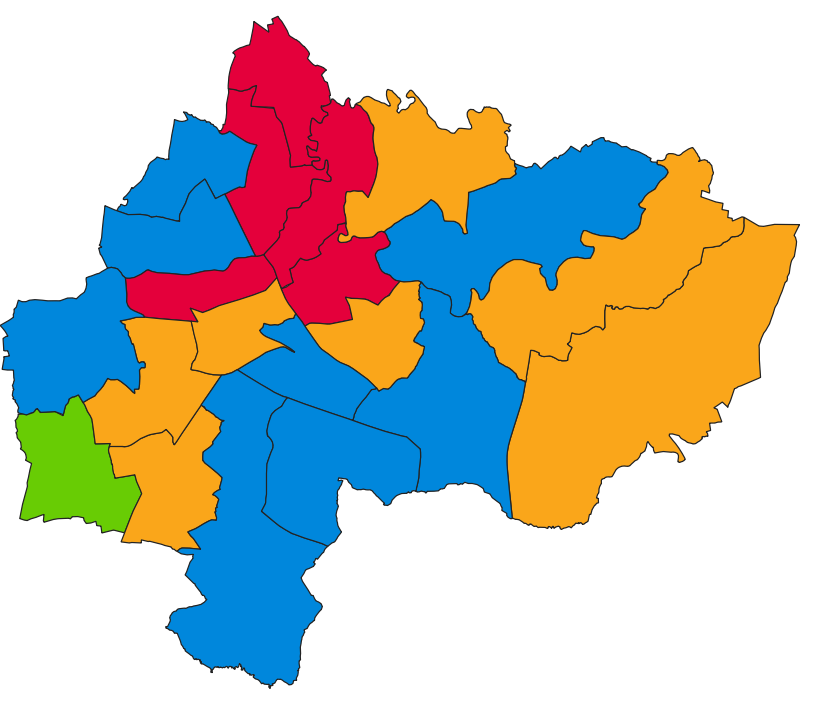
- Map of results of 1992 election
Leader of the Council before election
No leader
No overall control
Leader of the Council after election
No leader
No overall control

Elections to Stockport Council were held on Thursday, 7 May 1992. One third of the council was up for election, with each successful candidate to serve a four-year term of office, expiring in 1996. The council remained under no overall control.

== Election result ==
Party	Votes		Seats			Full Council	
Liberal Democrats	31,003 (33.7%)	▼2.6	7 (33.3%)	7 / 21	Steady	26 (41.3%)	26 / 63
Conservative Party	36,618 (39.9%)	▲7.5	8 (38.1%)	8 / 21	Steady	17 (27.0%)	17 / 63
Labour Party	20,353 (22.2%)	▼4.3	5 (23.8%)	5 / 21	Steady	17 (27.0%)	17 / 63
Heald Green Ratepayers	3,021 (3.3%)	▲0.3	1 (4.8%)	1 / 21	Steady	3 (4.8%)	3 / 63
Green Party	879 (1.0%)	▼0.8	0 (0.0%)	0 / 21	Steady	0 (0.0%)	0 / 63

↓
17	26	3	17

== Ward results ==
=== Bredbury ===
Bredbury
Party	Candidate	Votes	%	±%
Liberal Democrats	M. Wilson*	2,368	54.9	+4.2
Conservative	P. Orton	1,200	27.8	+9.5
Labour	S. Humphries	747	17.3	−13.7
Majority		1,168	27.1	+7.4
Turnout		4,315	37.0	−9.9
Liberal Democrats hold		Swing		

=== Brinnington ===
Brinnington
Party	Candidate	Votes	%	±%
Labour	M. Rowles*	2,037	78.9	−0.5
Conservative	J. Frost	300	11.6	+2.4
Liberal Democrats	A. Cliffe	186	7.2	−1.2
Green	N. Butterfield	60	2.3	−0.7
Majority		1,737	67.3	−2.9
Turnout		2,583	32.4	−11.7
Labour hold		Swing		

=== Cale Green ===
Cale Green
Party	Candidate	Votes	%	±%
Liberal Democrats	M. Cliffe	1,338	41.9	−15.5
Labour	M. Weldon	1,290	40.4	+8.1
Conservative	J. Hurley	502	15.7	+6.7
Green	E. Massey-Corte	65	2.0	+0.6
Majority		48	1.5	−23.6
Turnout		3,195	36.7	−16.4
Liberal Democrats gain from Labour		Swing		

=== Cheadle ===
Cheadle
Party	Candidate	Votes	%	±%
Conservative	L. Livesley*	2,443	66.6	+8.1
Liberal Democrats	A. Lee	870	23.7	−2.6
Labour	A. Kellett	353	9.6	−5.6
Majority		1,573	42.9	+10.7
Turnout		3,666	37.8	−7.3
Conservative hold		Swing		

=== Cheadle Hulme North ===
Cheadle Hulme North
Party	Candidate	Votes	%	±%
Liberal Democrats	P. Porgess*	1,984	49.1	−2.0
Conservative	L. Morgan	1,604	39.7	+7.1
Labour	P. Dykes	452	11.2	−5.0
Majority		380	9.4	−9.1
Turnout		4,040	34.7	−9.8
Liberal Democrats hold		Swing		

=== Cheadle Hulme South ===
Cheadle Hulme South
Party	Candidate	Votes	%	±%
Liberal Democrats	M. Lowe*	2,752	53.1	−0.8
Conservative	J. Lowry	2,243	43.3	+6.2
Labour	D. Wastell	187	3.6	−2.4
Majority		509	9.8	−7.4
Turnout		5,182	46.8	−6.8
Liberal Democrats hold		Swing		

=== Davenport ===
Davenport
Party	Candidate	Votes	%	±%
Conservative	G. Coales*	2,169	51.3	+10.4
Labour	J. Woodrow	1,572	37.2	−6.2
Liberal Democrats	F. Cooper	401	9.5	−2.4
Green	J. Clements	82	1.9	−1.8
Majority		597	14.1	
Turnout		4,224	44.7	−3.9
Conservative hold		Swing		

=== East Bramhall ===
East Bramhall
Party	Candidate	Votes	%	±%
Conservative	D. Havers*	3,572	64.0	+6.6
Liberal Democrats	P. Gooding	1,531	27.5	−1.1
Labour	J. McConnell	346	6.2	−4.5
Green	M. Suter	128	2.3	−1.0
Majority		2,041	36.6	+7.8
Turnout		5,577	43.4	−8.9
Conservative hold		Swing		

=== Edgeley ===
Edgeley
Party	Candidate	Votes	%	±%
Labour	D. McMillan	1,795	44.3	+1.6
Liberal Democrats	D. Evans	1,584	39.1	−4.6
Conservative	S. Kirkham	585	14.4	+3.2
Green	I. Boyd	87	2.1	−0.3
Majority		211	5.2	
Turnout		4,051	41.7	−9.8
Labour gain from Liberal Democrats		Swing		

=== Great Moor ===
Great Moor
Party	Candidate	Votes	%	±%
Liberal Democrats	A. Walker	1,941	40.9	−6.9
Conservative	B. Haley	1,600	33.7	+11.7
Labour	B. Holland	1,201	25.3	−3.1
Majority		341	7.2	−12.2
Turnout		4,742	44.3	−10.2
Liberal Democrats gain from Labour		Swing		

=== Hazel Grove ===
Hazel Grove
Party	Candidate	Votes	%	±%
Conservative	T. Dunstan*	3,030	50.4	+10.1
Liberal Democrats	J. Pallot	2,564	42.6	−4.1
Labour	M. Wallis	419	7.0	−3.7
Majority		466	7.8	
Turnout		6,013	49.2	−4.0
Conservative hold		Swing		

=== Heald Green ===
Heald Green
Party	Candidate	Votes	%	±%
Heald Green Ratepayers	R. Stenson*	3,021	78.1	+6.1
Conservative	S. Swinglehurst	461	11.9	−1.1
Labour	J. Becker	261	6.7	−4.1
Liberal Democrats	D. Roberts Jones	127	3.3	−1.0
Majority		2,560	66.2	+7.2
Turnout		3,870	38.1	−7.4
Heald Green Ratepayers hold		Swing		

=== Heaton Mersey ===
Heaton Mersey
Party	Candidate	Votes	%	±%
Conservative	E. Foulkes*	2,765	52.0	+7.0
Labour	L. Auger	1,885	35.5	−2.0
Liberal Democrats	P. Rowe	411	7.7	−3.3
Green	D. Carter	252	4.7	−1.8
Majority		880	16.5	+9.0
Turnout		5,313	46.1	−8.1
Conservative hold		Swing		

=== Heaton Moor ===
Heaton Moor
Party	Candidate	Votes	%	±%
Conservative	J. MacCarron*	2,379	58.1	+6.5
Labour	T. Grundy	1,074	26.2	−4.6
Liberal Democrats	K. Crauford	571	13.9	0
Green	I. Lindsay-Dunn	72	1.8	−1.9
Majority		1,305	31.9	+11.1
Turnout		4,096	42.4	−5.6
Conservative hold		Swing		

=== Manor ===
Manor
Party	Candidate	Votes	%	±%
Labour	I. Jackson	1,573	40.5	+4.4
Liberal Democrats	D. Talbot*	1,532	39.4	−11.7
Conservative	E. Dennis	719	18.5	+7.4
Green	R. Lindsay-Dunn	60	1.5	−0.2
Majority		41	1.1	
Turnout		3,884	40.9	−13.7
Labour gain from Liberal Democrats		Swing		

=== North Marple ===
North Marple
Party	Candidate	Votes	%	±%
Liberal Democrats	J. Roberts*	2,201	50.0	−1.5
Conservative	J. Stanyer	1,873	42.5	+6.2
Labour	A. Tognarelli	332	7.5	−4.7
Majority		328	7.5	−7.7
Turnout		4,406	46.9	−4.1
Liberal Democrats hold		Swing		

=== North Reddish ===
North Reddish
Party	Candidate	Votes	%	±%
Labour	R. Smith*	1,903	50.2	+0.9
Liberal Democrats	J. Keane	1,295	34.2	−4.8
Conservative	S. Swinyard	520	13.7	+2.0
Green	I. Phillips	73	1.9	N/A
Majority		608	16.0	+5.7
Turnout		3,791	31.7	−11.0
Labour hold		Swing		

=== Romiley ===
Romiley
Party	Candidate	Votes	%	±%
Conservative	H. Whitehead*	2,261	46.8	+9.4
Liberal Democrats	H. Lees	2,083	43.1	−0.2
Labour	D. Brown	485	10.0	−9.2
Majority		178	3.7	
Turnout		4,829	43.2	−9.3
Conservative hold		Swing		

=== South Marple ===
South Marple
Party	Candidate	Votes	%	±%
Liberal Democrats	T. Jackson*	2,558	49.0	−2.2
Conservative	G. Mottram	2,449	46.9	+8.2
Labour	H. Abrams	210	4.0	−3.1
Majority		109	2.1	−10.4
Turnout		5,217	52.9	−1.7
Liberal Democrats hold		Swing		

=== South Reddish ===
South Reddish
Party	Candidate	Votes	%	±%
Labour	M. A. Coffey*	2,049	61.1	−4.8
Conservative	S. Burt	927	27.7	+6.6
Liberal Democrats	I. McLean	375	11.2	−1.8
Majority		1,122	33.4	−11.4
Turnout		3,351	31.1	−10.7
Labour hold		Swing		

=== West Bramhall ===
West Bramhall
Party	Candidate	Votes	%	±%
Conservative	S. Taylor	3,016	54.5	−2.2
Liberal Democrats	P. Calton	2,331	42.2	+5.6
Labour	S. Bennett	182	3.3	−3.4
Majority		685	13.3	−7.8
Turnout		5,529	47.9	−3.1
Conservative hold		Swing		
