= David Goddard, Baron Goddard of Stockport =

British politician

The Right Honourable The Lord Goddard of Stockport
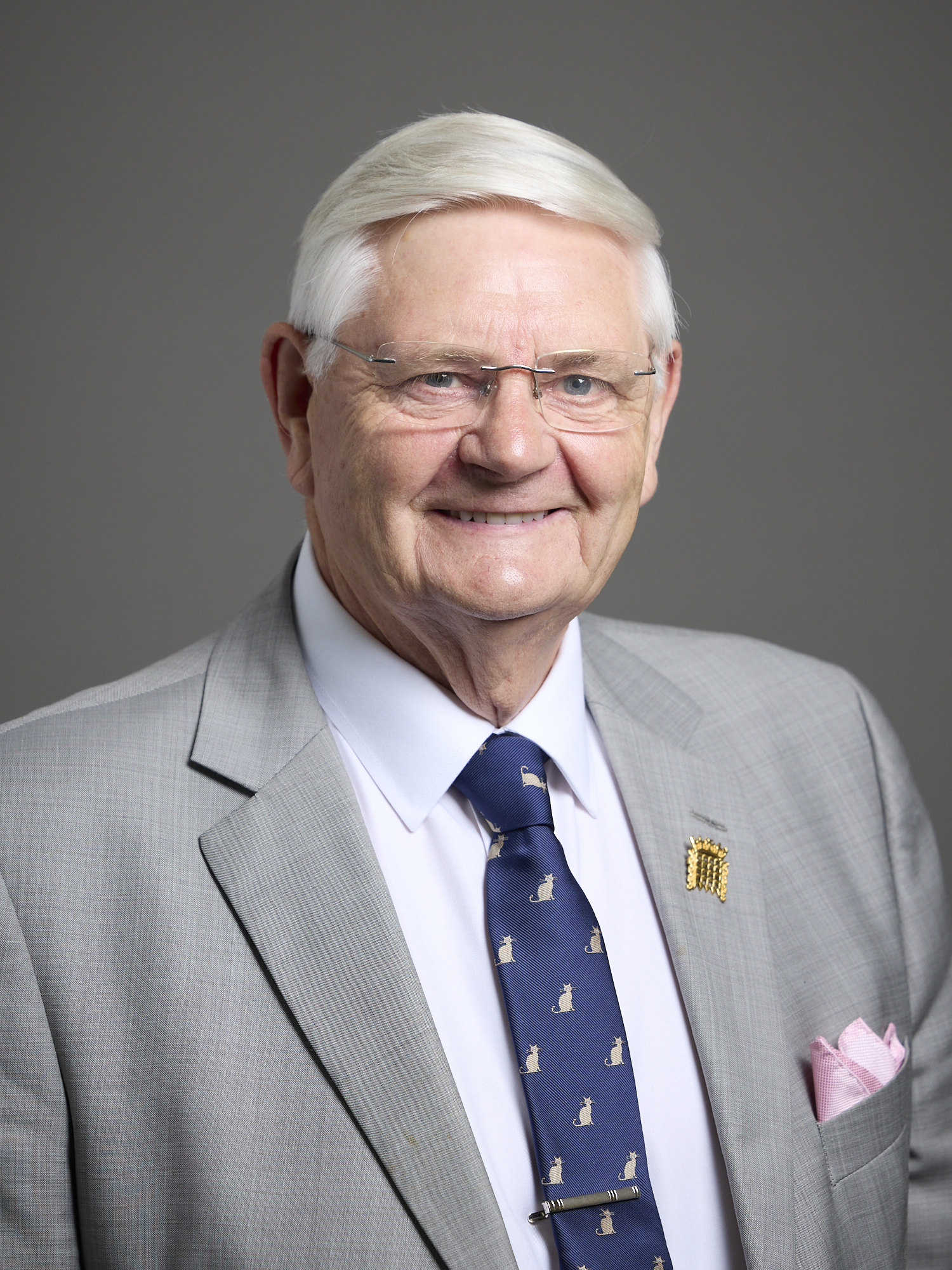
- Official portrait, 2026

Chief Whip of the Liberal Democrats in the House of Lords
- Incumbent
- Assumed office 1 February 2026
- Preceded by: Baron Stoneham of Droxford

Member of the House of Lords
- Lord Temporal
- Life peerage 15 September 2014

Leader of Stockport Metropolitan Borough Council
- In office 2007–2012
- Preceded by: Brian Millard
- Succeeded by: Sue Derbyshire

Personal details
- Born: 2 October 1952 (age 74)
- Party: Liberal Democrats

David Goddard, Baron Goddard of Stockport (born 2 October 1952) is a British Liberal Democrat politician. He was made a life peer, as Baron Goddard of Stockport, of Stockport in the County of Greater Manchester, on 15 September 2014.

A gas engineer by trade, he was an elected member of Stockport Metropolitan Borough Council from 1990 until 2012 - initially as a Labour councillor before defecting to the Liberal Democrats around the turn of the millennium - and was elected again in 2014 before standing down in 2018. He was leader of the council between 2007 and 2012.

In February 2026, he became Liberal Democrat Chief Whip in the House of Lords.

== Elections contested ==
=== Stockport Metropolitan Borough Council elections ===
| Year | Ward | Party | Votes | % votes | Position | Ref. |
|---|---|---|---|---|---|---|
| 1988 | Romiley | Labour | 1,300 | 23.4 | 3rd of 5 | |
| 1990 | South Reddish | Labour | 4,054 | 73.7 | Won | |
| 1994 | South Reddish | Labour | 2,476 | 60.0 | Won | |
| 1998 | South Reddish | Labour | 1,551 | 70.6 | Won | |
| 2002 | Great Moor | Liberal Democrats | 1,622 | 52.9 | Won | |
| 2004 | Offerton | Liberal Democrats | 1,806 | 44.8 | Won | |
| 2008 | Offerton | Liberal Democrats | 1,602 | 48.8 | Won | |
| 2012 | Offerton | Liberal Democrats | 1,301 | 35.6 | 2nd of 4 | |
| 2014 | Offerton | Liberal Democrats | 1,159 | 32.0 | Won | |

Orders of precedence in the United Kingdom
| Preceded by The Lord Suri | Gentlemen; Baron Rose of Monewden | Followed by The Lord Rose of Monewden |
