= 1988 Stockport Metropolitan Borough Council election =

Local election in Stockport

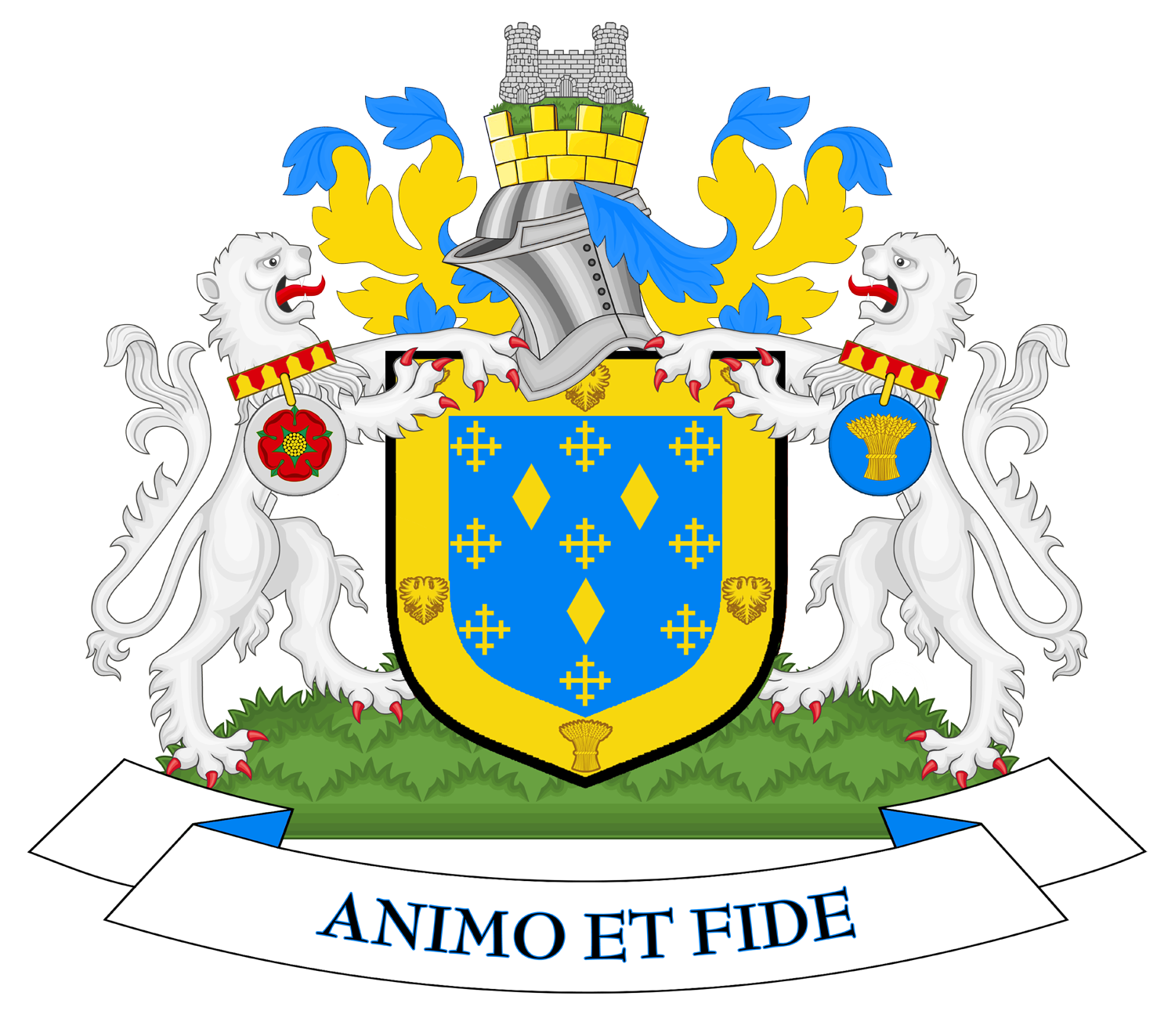
- 5 May 1988

22 of 63 seats to Stockport Metropolitan Borough Council 32 seats needed for a majority
	First party	Second party	Third party
Leader	John Ashworth	John Needham	Alan Mobbs
Party	SLD	Conservative	Labour
Leader's seat	Edgeley	Cheadle	South Reddish
Last election	10 seats, 37.1%	6 seats, 38.3%	4 seats, 20.8%
Seats before	23	22	14
Seats won	6	10	5
Seats after	24	22	14
Seat change	▲1	Steady	Steady
Popular vote	30,812	43,311	27,481
Percentage	28.0%	39.4%	25.0%
Swing	▼9.1%	▲1.1%	▲4.2%
	Fourth party
Leader	Ron Stenson
Party	Heald Green Ratepayers
Leader's seat	Heald Green
Last election	1 seat, 3.0%
Seats before	3
Seats won	1
Seats after	3
Seat change	Steady
Popular vote	3,265
Percentage	3.0%
Swing	Steady
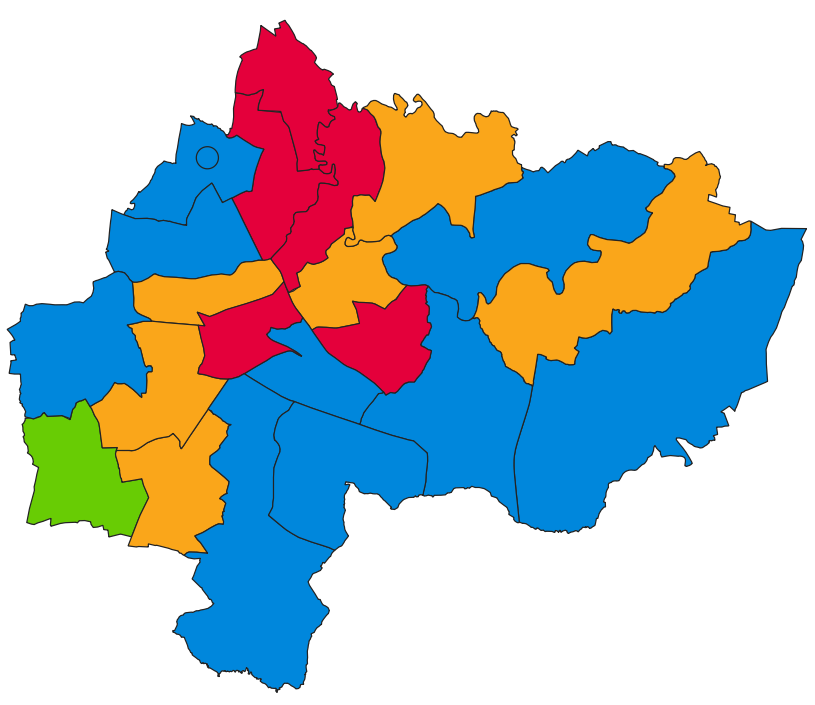
- Map of results of 1988 election
Leader of the Council before election
No leader
No overall control
Leader of the Council after election
No leader
No overall control

Elections to Stockport Council were held on Thursday, 5 May 1988. One third of the council was up for election, with each successful candidate to serve a four-year term of office, expiring in 1992. The council remained under no overall control.

== Election result ==
Party	Votes		Seats			Full Council	
SLD	30,812 (28.0%)	▼9.1	6 (27.3%)	6 / 22	▲1	24 (38.1%)	24 / 63
Conservative Party	43,311 (39.4%)	▲1.1	10 (45.5%)	10 / 22	Steady	22 (34.9%)	22 / 63
Labour Party	27,481 (25.0%)	▲4.2	5 (22.7%)	5 / 22	Steady	14 (22.2%)	14 / 63
Heald Green Ratepayers	3,265 (3.0%)	Steady	1 (4.5%)	1 / 22	Steady	3 (4.8%)	3 / 63
SDP	2,428 (2.2%)	N/A	0 (0.0%)	0 / 22	N/A	0 (0.0%)	0 / 63
Green Party	2,225 (2.0%)	▲1.2	0 (0.0%)	0 / 22	Steady	0 (0.0%)	0 / 63
Independent Labour	417 (0.4%)	▲0.4	0 (0.0%)	0 / 22	▼1	0 (0.0%)	0 / 63

↓
14	24	3	22

== Ward results ==
=== Bredbury ===
Bredbury
Party	Candidate	Votes	%	±%
SLD	M. Wilson*	2,551	48.6	−4.3
Conservative	S. Frost	1,528	29.1	+1.5
Labour	J. Woodrow	1,104	21.0	+1.5
Green	R. Lindsay-Dunn	71	1.4	N/A
Majority		1,023	19.5	−5.8
Turnout		5,254	44.6	−6.1
SLD hold		Swing		

=== Brinnington ===
Brinnington
Party	Candidate	Votes	%	±%
Labour	M. Rowles*	2,657	82.4	+8.6
Conservative	P. Hooley	320	9.9	−2.4
SLD	D. Roberts-Jones	197	6.1	−7.8
Green	S. Boyd	50	1.6	N/A
Majority		2,337	72.5	+12.6
Turnout		3,224	39.2	−1.6
Labour hold		Swing		

=== Cale Green ===
Cale Green
Party	Candidate	Votes	%	±%
Labour	K. Bagnall*	1,800	42.6	+2.5
SLD	P. Beatty	1,385	32.8	−6.9
Conservative	J. Wiedman	665	15.7	−4.5
Independent Labour	R. Boyd	163	3.9	N/A
SDP	E. Harding	160	3.8	N/A
Green	M. Ledger	56	1.3	N/A
Majority		415	9.8	+9.4
Turnout		4,229	45.6	−0.3
Labour hold		Swing		

=== Cheadle ===
Cheadle
Party	Candidate	Votes	%	±%
Conservative	L. Livesley*	2,652	61.1	+8.2
SLD	I. Kirk	966	22.3	−18.6
Labour	A. Kellett	487	11.2	+5.0
SDP	M. Gregory	134	3.1	N/A
Green	C. Jackson	101	2.3	N/A
Majority		1,686	38.8	+26.8
Turnout		4,340	42.8	−11.4
Conservative hold		Swing		

=== Cheadle Hulme North ===
Cheadle Hulme North
Party	Candidate	Votes	%	±%
SLD	P. Porgess*	2,777	50.3	−1.8
Conservative	V. Brooks	2,032	36.8	−0.3
Labour	D. Bennett	527	9.5	−0.3
SDP	D. Owen	134	2.4	N/A
Green	I. Boyd	53	1.0	0
Majority		745	13.5	−1.5
Turnout		5,523	45.6	−5.1
SLD hold		Swing		

=== Cheadle Hulme South ===
Cheadle Hulme South
Party	Candidate	Votes	%	±%
SLD	M. Lowe	2,740	45.4	−8.7
Conservative	P. Hudson	2,735	45.3	+5.2
Labour	R. Brown	331	5.5	+1.1
SDP	A. Jones	122	2.0	N/A
Green	I. McFadden	103	1.7	+0.4
Majority		5	0.1	−13.9
Turnout		6,031	53.1	−4.6
SLD hold		Swing		

=== Davenport ===
Davenport
Party	Candidate	Votes	%	±%
Conservative	G. Coales	2,008	45.4	−0.5
Labour	M. Jones	1,628	36.8	+6.3
SLD	R. Borrows	473	10.7	−10.2
SDP	S. Rimmer	196	4.4	N/A
Green	C. Wharf	116	2.6	0
Majority		380	8.6	−6.8
Turnout		4,421	45.3	−6.7
Conservative hold		Swing		

=== East Bramhall ===
East Bramhall
Party	Candidate	Votes	%	±%
Conservative	D. Havers*	4,011	65.4	+5.8
SLD	J. Pruce	1,497	24.4	−8.8
Labour	W. Greaves	483	7.9	+2.8
SDP	J. Skorecki	141	2.3	N/A
Majority		2,514	41.0	+16.6
Turnout		6,132	46.7	−9.0
Conservative hold		Swing		

=== Edgeley ===
Edgeley
Party	Candidate	Votes	%	±%
SLD	S. Rickman	1,910	40.7	−18.9
Labour	B. Farebrother	1,731	36.9	+8.6
Conservative	K. Potts	963	20.5	+9.4
Green	S. Filmore	93	2.0	+1.0
Majority		179	3.8	−27.5
Turnout		4,697	47.1	−8.2
SLD gain from Labour		Swing		

=== Great Moor ===
Great Moor
Party	Candidate	Votes	%	±%
Labour	D. Rowbotham	1,684	32.9	+4.9
SLD	S. Oldham	1,595	31.1	−10.7
Conservative	P. Lloyd*	1,588	31.0	+1.4
SDP	W. Cunningham	170	3.3	N/A
Green	P. Jordan	88	1.7	+1.1
Majority		89	1.8	
Turnout		5,125	46.1	−9.0
Labour gain from Conservative		Swing		

=== Hazel Grove ===
Hazel Grove
Party	Candidate	Votes	%	±%
Conservative	T. Dunstan	2,823	44.4	+0.7
SLD	C. Beaver	2,782	43.8	−3.4
Labour	M. Wallis	551	8.7	+0.9
Green	M. Suter	103	1.6	+0.3
SDP	S. Lomas	96	1.5	N/A
Majority		41	0.6	
Turnout		6,355	50.6	−6.7
Conservative gain from SLD		Swing		

=== Heald Green ===
Heald Green
Party	Candidate	Votes	%	±%
Heald Green Ratepayers	R. Stenson*	3,265	69.7	−0.5
Conservative	C. Turner	810	17.3	+1.3
Labour	J. Becker	406	8.7	+1.7
SLD	N. Fawcett	156	3.3	−3.4
Green	J. Filmore	49	1.0	N/A
Majority		2,455	52.4	−1.8
Turnout		4,686	44.0	−3.7
Heald Green Ratepayers hold		Swing		

=== Heaton Mersey ===
Heaton Mersey
Party	Candidate	Votes	%	±%
Conservative	E. Foulkes*	2,659	49.3	−4.2
Labour	S. Bailey	1,659	30.8	+5.2
SLD	A. Walker	477	8.9	−12.0
SDP	E. Cunningham	298	5.5	N/A
Green	D. Carter	296	5.5	N/A
Majority		1,000	18.6	−9.3
Turnout		5,389	46.1	−7.9
Conservative hold		Swing		

=== Heaton Moor ===
Heaton Moor (2 vacancies)
Party	Candidate	Votes	%	±%
Conservative	J. MacCarron	2,662	56.3	−2.8
Conservative	J. Lloyd*	2,630	55.6	−3.5
Labour	H. Nance	1,190	25.2	+5.9
Labour	T. Grundy	1,063	22.5	+3.2
SLD	A. McLean	523	11.1	−8.6
SLD	J. Facer-Smith	431	9.1	−10.6
Green	F. Chapman	325	6.9	+4.9
SDP	I. Lomas	156	3.3	N/A
Majority		1,440	30.4	−8.9
Turnout		4,730	46.3	−3.9
Conservative hold		Swing		
Conservative hold		Swing		

=== Manor ===
Manor
Party	Candidate	Votes	%	±%
SLD	D. Talbot	2,321	47.1	−2.2
Labour	T. McGee*	1,831	37.2	+5.4
Conservative	C. Brown	697	14.2	−3.8
Green	A. McKenzie	74	1.5	+0.6
Majority		490	9.9	−7.6
Turnout		4,923	50.5	−3.5
SLD gain from Labour		Swing		

=== North Marple ===
North Marple
Party	Candidate	Votes	%	±%
SLD	J. Roberts*	2,295	47.5	−1.8
Conservative	D. Lomas	1,923	39.8	−0.4
Labour	A. Tognarelli	442	9.2	+0.4
Green	J. Armstrong	104	2.2	+0.5
SDP	R. McKnight	64	1.3	N/A
Majority		372	7.7	−1.4
Turnout		4,828	51.2	−6.6
SLD hold		Swing		

=== North Reddish ===
North Reddish
Party	Candidate	Votes	%	±%
Labour	A. Flood*	3,092	64.8	+1.6
Conservative	S. Rixon	1,111	23.3	−13.5
SLD	C. Phythian	336	7.0	N/A
SDP	V. Griffiths	136	2.8	N/A
Green	D. Gibson	97	2.0	N/A
Majority		1,981	41.5	+15.1
Turnout		4,772	39.0	−4.2
Labour hold		Swing		

=== Romiley ===
Romiley
Party	Candidate	Votes	%	±%
Conservative	H. Whitehead*	2,452	44.1	+4.6
SLD	S. Swiffin	1,565	28.2	−17.2
Labour	D. Goddard	1,300	23.4	+8.2
SDP	S. Jeffries	129	2.3	N/A
Green	I. Lindsay-Dunn	112	2.0	N/A
Majority		887	15.9	
Turnout		5,558	47.9	−5.4
Conservative hold		Swing		

=== South Marple ===
South Marple
Party	Candidate	Votes	%	±%
Conservative	C. Mason*	2,538	46.2	+4.2
SLD	T. Jackson	2,425	44.2	−7.1
Labour	S. Rodrigues	329	6.0	+1.2
Green	N. Watson	137	2.5	+0.6
SDP	F. Ansell	62	1.1	N/A
Majority		113	2.0	
Turnout		5,491	54.1	−5.5
Conservative hold		Swing		

=== South Reddish ===
South Reddish
Party	Candidate	Votes	%	±%
Labour	M. A. Coffey*	2,762	60.2	+11.4
Conservative	R. Camblin	1,170	25.5	−6.4
SDP	H. Griffiths	298	6.5	N/A
Independent Labour	A. Bradbury*	254	5.5	N/A
Green	S. Ledger	107	2.3	+0.9
Majority		1,592	34.7	+17.8
Turnout		4,591	41.4	−2.5
Labour gain from Independent Labour		Swing		

=== West Bramhall ===
West Bramhall
Party	Candidate	Votes	%	±%
Conservative	D. West*	3,334	61.9	+2.2
SLD	M. Walker	1,410	26.2	−9.0
Labour	S. Humphries	424	7.9	+2.8
SDP	P. Vittoz	132	2.4	N/A
Green	G. Johnson	90	1.7	N/A
Majority		1,924	35.7	+11.2
Turnout		5,390	44.8	−7.6
Conservative hold		Swing		
