= Brian Millard =

British politician (died 2009)

Leader of Stockport Metropolitan Borough Council
- In office 2005–2007
- Preceded by: Mark Hunter
- Succeeded by: David Goddard

Member of Stockport Metropolitan Borough Council for Cheadle and Gatley
- In office 2005 – 4 July 2009

Personal details
- Died: 4 July 2009
- Party: Liberal Democrats
- Education: University of Liverpool
- Occupation: Liberal Democrat councillor

Brian Millard was a British local politician, and was the leader of Stockport Metropolitan Borough Council 2005–2007.

Millard attained a degree in chemistry from the University of Sheffield, before attending the University of Liverpool to complete his doctorate.

He was the Liberal Democrat Leader of Stockport Metropolitan Borough Council (SMBC) from 2005 to 2007. As such he took political responsibility for all Executive Councillors' portfolios and deputizes for other Executive Councillors. Millard took over as leader of the council from Mark Hunter after Hunter's byelection success beating Stephen Day in 2005.

He died on 4 July 2009 at the age of 71 and had recently been elected Deputy Chairman of the local Fire Authority.

Until his death, Millard represented the Cheadle and Gatley ward, he was re-elected on Thursday 4 May 2006 with a majority of several hundred votes.
