= Marple South and High Lane =

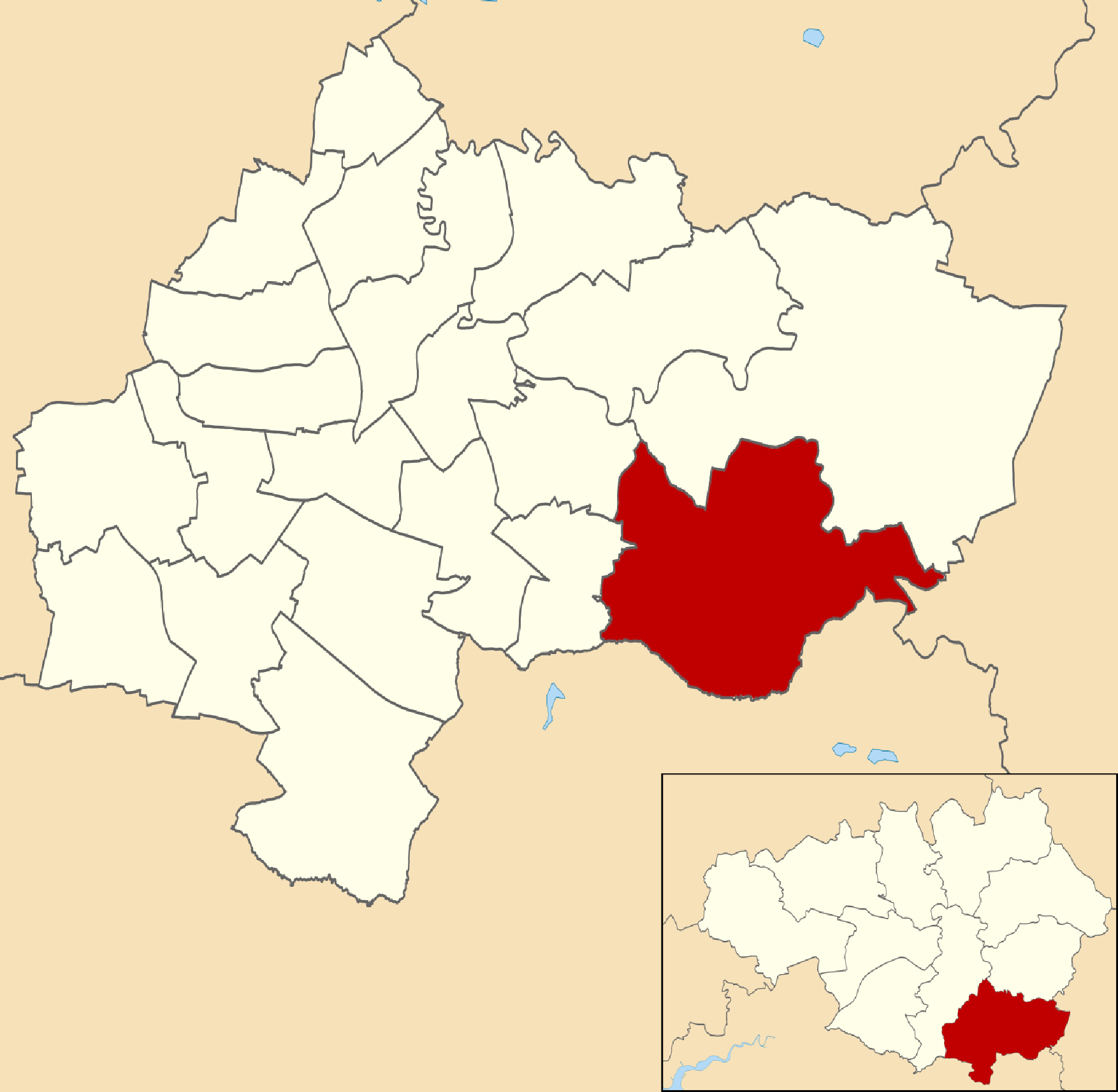
- Marple South and High Lane within Stockport
- Population: 9,733 (2010)
- Country: England
- Sovereign state: United Kingdom
- UK Parliament: Hazel Grove
- Councillors: Colin MacAlister (Liberal Democrat); Aron Thornley (Liberal Democrat); Shan Alexander (Liberal Democrat)

Marple South and High Lane is an electoral ward in the Metropolitan Borough of Stockport. It elects three Councillors to Stockport Metropolitan Borough Council using the first past the post electoral method, electing one Councillor every year without election on the fourth.

It covers the southern part of Marple. Together with Bredbury & Woodley, Bredbury Green and Romiley, Hazel Grove, Manor, Marple North and Offerton, and part of the Norbury and Woodsmoor ward, it constitutes the Hazel Grove Parliamentary constituency. Marple South and High Lane is also home to the Marple Sixth Form College, which is part of Cheadle and Marple Sixth Form College.

The ward was previously called Marple South but the council agreed to the ward's name change in October 2017 following a public consultation.

== Councillors ==
Marple South and High Lane electoral ward is represented in Westminster by Lisa Smart MP for Hazel Grove.

The ward is represented on Stockport Council by three councillors: Colin Macalister (Lib Dem), Aron Thornley (Labour), and Shan Alexander (Lib Dem).

Election	Councillor	Councillor	Councillor
2004	Roy Weaver (Lib Dem)	Chris Baker (Lib Dem)	Shan Alexander (Lib Dem)
2006	Sue Ingham (Lib Dem)	Chris Baker (Lib Dem)	Shan Alexander (Lib Dem)
2007	Sue Ingham (Lib Dem)	Chris Baker (Lib Dem)	Shan Alexander (Lib Dem)
2008	Sue Ingham (Lib Dem)	Chris Baker (Lib Dem)	Shan Alexander (Lib Dem)
2010	Sue Ingham (Lib Dem)	Chris Baker (Lib Dem)	Shan Alexander (Lib Dem)
2011	Sue Ingham (Lib Dem)	Kevin Dowling (Lib Dem)	Shan Alexander (Lib Dem)
2012	Sue Ingham (Lib Dem)	Kevin Dowling (Lib Dem)	Shan Alexander (Lib Dem)
2014	Sue Ingham (Lib Dem)	Kevin Dowling (Lib Dem)	Shan Alexander (Lib Dem)
2015	Sue Ingham (Lib Dem)	Kenny Blair (Con)	Shan Alexander (Lib Dem)
2016	Sue Ingham (Lib Dem)	Kenny Blair (Con)	Tom Dowse (Con)
May 2018	Colin MacAlister (Lib Dem)	Kenny Blair (Con)	Tom Dowse (Con)
July 2018	Colin MacAlister (Lib Dem)	Kenny Blair (Ind)	Tom Dowse (Con)
2019	Colin MacAlister (Lib Dem)	Aron Thornley (Lib Dem)	Tom Dowse (Con)
2021	Colin MacAlister (Lib Dem)	Aron Thornley (Lib Dem)	Shan Alexander (Lib Dem)
2022	Colin MacAlister (Lib Dem)	Aron Thornley (Lib Dem)	Shan Alexander (Lib Dem)
2023	Colin MacAlister (Lib Dem)	Aron Thornley (Independent)	Shan Alexander (Lib Dem)
2024	Colin MacAlister (Lib Dem)	Aron Thornley (Labour)	Shan Alexander (Lib Dem)

indicates seat up for re-election. indicates councillor defected.

== Elections in the 2020s ==
=== May 2026 ===
Marple South & High Lane
Party	Candidate	Votes	%	±%
Liberal Democrats	Dominic Warner	2,267	47.3	−7.6
Reform	Carl Rydings	1,214	25.3	N/A
Green	Rebecca Hurst	593	12.4	+2.0
Conservative	Annette Finnie	507	10.6	−9.5
Labour	Brian Wild	214	4.5	−10.2
Majority		1,053	22.0	
Turnout		4,806	48.6	+9.1
Registered electors		9,881		
Liberal Democrats hold		Swing		

=== May 2024 ===
Marple South & High Lane
Party	Candidate	Votes	%	±%
Liberal Democrats	Colin MacAlister*	2,099	54.9	+0.1
Conservative	Elizabeth Arnold	767	20.1	−3.7
Labour	Mags Hindle	562	14.7	+2.2
Green	Andrew Threlfall	397	10.4	−4.6
Majority		1,332	34.8	
Turnout		3,876	39.5	+1.3
Registered electors		9,806		
Liberal Democrats hold		Swing		

=== May 2023 ===
Marple South & High Lane (3)
Party	Candidate	Votes	%
Liberal Democrats	Shan Alexander	2,168	57.4
Liberal Democrats	Aron Thornley	2,115	56.0
Liberal Democrats	Colin MacAlister	2,069	54.8
Conservative	Annette Finnie	898	23.8
Conservative	Andrew Lord	807	21.4
Conservative	William Morley-Scott	721	19.1
Green	Andrew Threlfall	565	15.0
Labour	Mags Hindle	473	12.5
Labour	Peter Towey	363	9.6
Labour	Matthew Whittley	316	8.4
Rejected ballots		8	
Turnout		3,777	38.2
Total votes		10,495	
Registered electors		9,882	
Liberal Democrats win (new seat)			
Liberal Democrats win (new seat)			
Liberal Democrats win (new seat)			

=== May 2022 ===
Marple South and High Lane
Party	Candidate	Votes	%	±%
Liberal Democrats	Colin MacAlister*	2,334	58.0	+8
Conservative	Andrew Lord	1,025	25.5	−5
Labour	Paul Wright	424	10.5	−2
Green	Andrew Threlfall	224	5.6	±0
Majority		1,309	32.5	
Rejected ballots		16	0.4	
Turnout		4,023	40.3	−6
Registered electors		9,977		
Liberal Democrats hold		Swing		

=== May 2021 ===
Marple South and High Lane
Party	Candidate	Votes	%	±%
Liberal Democrats	Shan Alexander	2,299	50	+4
Conservative	Darran Palmer	1,409	31	+16
Labour	Paul Wright	613	13	+2
Green	Andrew Threlfall	290	6	+1
Majority		890		
Turnout		4,639	46	
Registered electors		9,978		
Liberal Democrats gain from Conservative		Swing		

== Elections in the 2010s ==
=== May 2019 ===
Kenny Blair left the Conservatives and became an independent councillor in 2018.

2019
Party	Candidate	Votes	%	±%
Liberal Democrats	Aron Thornley	2,037	46	
Independent	Kenny Blair	1,030	23	
Conservative	Darran John Palmer	682	15	
Labour	Chris Wallis	477	11	
Green	Andrew Threlfall	233	5	
Majority		1,007		
Turnout		4,459	46	
Liberal Democrats gain from Conservative		Swing		

=== May 2018 ===
2018
Party	Candidate	Votes	%	±%
Liberal Democrats	Colin MacAlister	2,026	42	
Conservative	Yvonne Collier	1,871	39	
Labour	Christopher Wallis	756	16	
Green	Robbie Lee	138	3	
Majority		155		
Turnout		4,791	48	
Liberal Democrats hold		Swing		

=== May 2016 ===
2016
Party	Candidate	Votes	%	±%
Conservative	Tom Dowse	1,651	37	
Liberal Democrats	Colin MacAlister	1,628	36	
Labour	Sheila Townsend	585	13	
UKIP	Grahame Bradbury	447	10	
Green	Graham Reid	178	4	
Majority		23		
Turnout		4,489	46	
Conservative gain from Liberal Democrats		Swing		

=== May 2015 ===
2015
Party	Candidate	Votes	%	±%
Conservative	Kenny Blair	2,731	38	
Liberal Democrats	Kevin Dowling	2,103	29	
Labour	Janet Glover	1,001	14	
UKIP	Darran Palmer	959	13	
Green	Graham Reid	422	6	
Majority		628		
Turnout		7,216	73	
Conservative gain from Liberal Democrats		Swing		

=== May 2014 ===
2014
Party	Candidate	Votes	%	±%
Liberal Democrats	Susan Ingham	1,535	38%	−11.79%
Conservative	Bev Morley-Scott	950	23%	−0.67%
UKIP	Darran John Palmer	873	22%	+10.2%
Labour	Kevin Dolan	446	11%	−3.34%
Green	Graham Douglas Reid	254	6%	N/A
Majority		585	15%	−11.12
Turnout		4058		
Liberal Democrats hold		Swing		

=== May 2012 ===
2012
Party	Candidate	Votes	%	±%
Liberal Democrats	Shan Alexander	1,906	49.79	−1.82
Conservative	Carl Rydings	906	23.67	−11.33
Labour	Clifford Stanway	549	14.34	+10.54
UKIP	Tony Moore	467	12.20	+7.14
Majority		1,000	26.12	
Turnout		3,851	39.57	
Liberal Democrats hold		Swing		

=== May 2011 ===
2011
Party	Candidate	Votes	%	±%
Liberal Democrats	Kevin Dowling	1,948	42.0	
Conservative	Andrew Lord	1,493	32.2	
Labour	Clifford Stanway	783	16.7	
UKIP	Tony Moore	380	8.2	
Majority		455		
Turnout		4,638	47.78	
Liberal Democrats hold		Swing		
