= Cheadle and Gatley (ward) =

Electoral ward in Greater Manchester, England

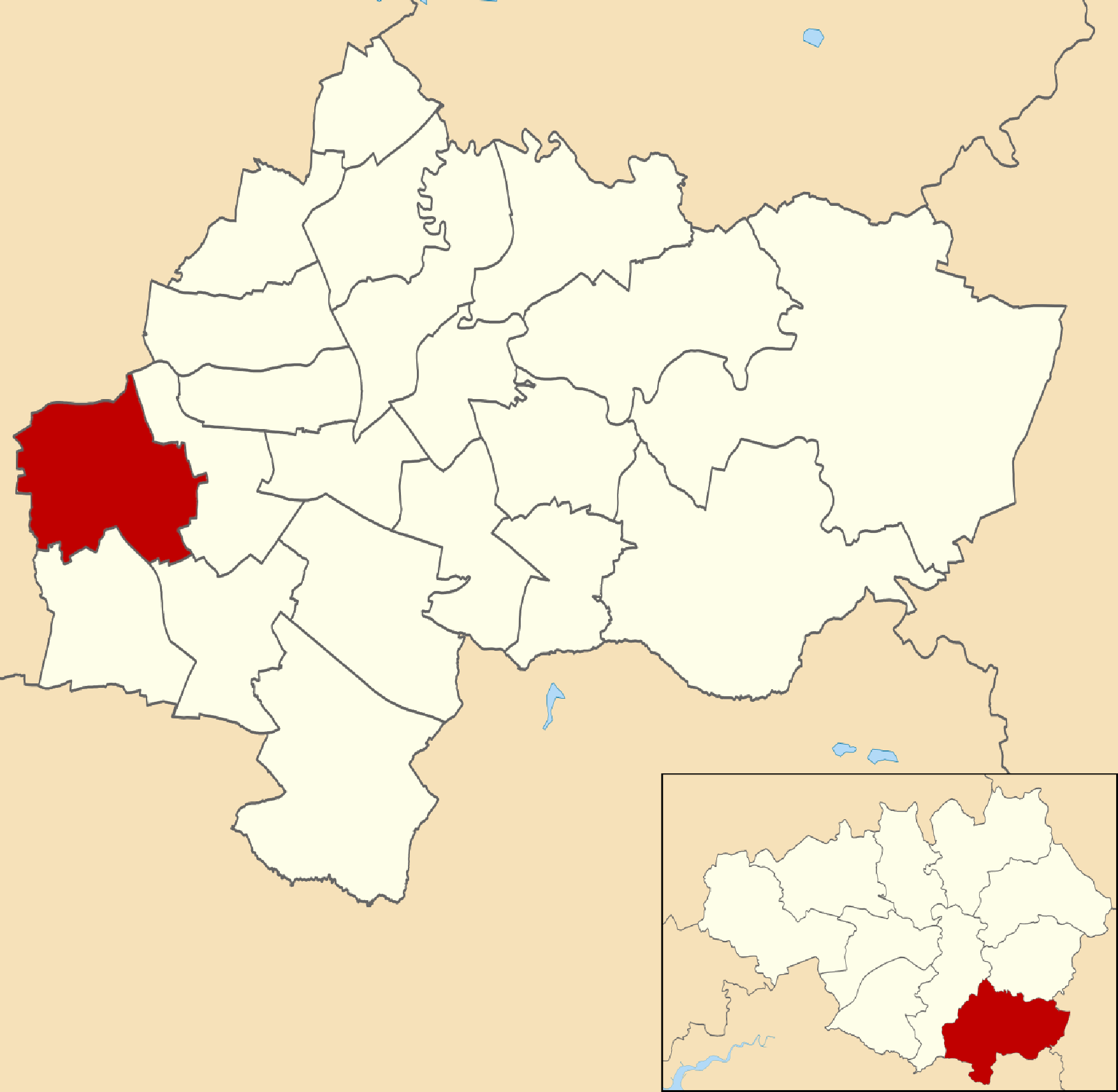
- Cheadle and Gatley within Stockport
- Area: 6.54 km^{2} (2.53 sq mi)
- Population: 14,698 (2011)
  - Density: 2,247/km^{2} (5,820/sq mi)
- Country: England
- Sovereign state: United Kingdom
- UK Parliament: Cheadle
- Councillors: Ian Hunter (Liberal Democrat); Graham Greenhalgh (Liberal Democrat); Keith Holloway (Liberal Democrat)

Cheadle and Gatley was an electoral ward in the Metropolitan Borough of Stockport between 2004 and 2023. It elected three councillors to Stockport Metropolitan Borough Council using the first past the post electoral method, electing one councillor every year without election on the fourth.

Together with Bramhall North, Bramhall South, Cheadle Hulme North, Cheadle Hulme South, Heald Green and Stepping Hill Wards it made up the Cheadle Parliamentary Constituency. The ward contained the Cheadle College, which is part of the Cheadle and Marple Sixth Form College.

The Cheadle and Gatley Urban District existed between 1886 and 1974 and had covered a larger area than the later Cheadle and Gatley ward.

== Councillors ==
Cheadle and Gatley electoral ward is represented in Westminster by Mary Robinson MP for Cheadle.

The ward is represented on Stockport Council by three councillors:

- Ian Hunter (Lib Dem)
- Graham Greenhalgh (Lib Dem)
- Keith Holloway (Lib Dem)

| Election | Councillor | Councillor | Councillor |
|---|---|---|---|
| 2004 | Brian Millard (Lib Dem) | Pam King (Lib Dem) | Paul Carter (Lib Dem) |
| 2006 | Brian Millard (Lib Dem) | Pam King (Lib Dem) | Paul Carter (Lib Dem) |
| 2007 | Brian Millard (Lib Dem) | Pam King (Lib Dem) | Paul Carter (Lib Dem) |
| 2008 | Brian Millard (Lib Dem) | Pam King (Lib Dem) | Mick Jones (Con) |
| By-election; 10 September 2009 | Iain Roberts (Lib Dem) | Pam King (Lib Dem) | Mick Jones (Con) |
| 2010 | Iain Roberts (Lib Dem) | Pam King (Lib Dem) | Mick Jones (Con) |
| 2011 | Iain Roberts (Lib Dem) | Pam King (Lib Dem) | Mick Jones (Con) |
| 2012 | Iain Roberts (Lib Dem) | Pam King (Lib Dem) | Keith Holloway (Lib Dem) |
| 2014 | Iain Roberts (Lib Dem) | Pam King (Lib Dem) | Keith Holloway (Lib Dem) |
| 2015 | Iain Roberts (Lib Dem) | Graham Greenhalgh (Lib Dem) | Keith Holloway (Lib Dem) |
| 2016 | Iain Roberts (Lib Dem) | Graham Greenhalgh (Lib Dem) | Keith Holloway (Lib Dem) |
| 2018 | Iain Roberts (Lib Dem) | Graham Greenhalgh (Lib Dem) | Keith Holloway (Lib Dem) |
| 2019 | Iain Roberts (Lib Dem) | Graham Greenhalgh (Lib Dem) | Keith Holloway (Lib Dem) |
| 2021 | Iain Roberts (Lib Dem) | Graham Greenhalgh (Lib Dem) | Keith Holloway (Lib Dem) |
| 2022 | Ian Hunter (Lib Dem) | Graham Greenhalgh (Lib Dem) | Keith Holloway (Lib Dem) |

indicates seat up for re-election. indicates seat won in by-election.

== Elections in 2010s ==
=== May 2019 ===
2019
| Party | Candidate | Votes | % | ±% |
|---|---|---|---|---|
| Liberal Democrats | Graham Greenhalgh | 2,088 | 49 | |
| Conservative | Mark Anthony Williams | 1,037 | 24 | |
| Labour | Khalid Mahmood Ahmed | 829 | 19 | |
| Green | Praveen Prabhakaran Kutty | 316 | 7 | |
| Majority | | 1,051 | | |
| Turnout | | 4,270 | 36 | |
| Liberal Democrats hold | | Swing | | |

=== May 2018 ===
2018
| Party | Candidate | Votes | % | ±% |
|---|---|---|---|---|
| Liberal Democrats | Iain Roberts | 2,281 | 47 | |
| Conservative | Jon Shaw | 1,420 | 29 | |
| Labour | Colin Owen | 1,047 | 22 | |
| Green | Karl Wardlaw | 99 | 2 | |
| Majority | | 861 | | |
| Turnout | | 4,847 | 41 | |
| Liberal Democrats hold | | Swing | | |

=== May 2016 ===
2016
| Party | Candidate | Votes | % | ±% |
|---|---|---|---|---|
| Liberal Democrats | Keith Holloway | 2,037 | 42 | |
| Conservative | Dawn Calmonson | 1,536 | 31 | |
| Labour | Colin Owen | 850 | 17 | |
| UKIP | Julie Warburton | 337 | 7 | |
| Green | Natasha Brooks | 144 | 3 | |
| Majority | | 501 | | |
| Turnout | | 4,904 | 42 | |
| Liberal Democrats hold | | Swing | | |

=== May 2015 ===
2015
| Party | Candidate | Votes | % | ±% |
|---|---|---|---|---|
| Liberal Democrats | Graham Greenhalgh | 3,056 | 36 | |
| Conservative | Graham Haslam | 2,602 | 31 | |
| Labour | Colin Owen | 1,687 | 20 | |
| UKIP | Michael Buxton | 678 | 8 | |
| Green | Natasha Brooks | 410 | 5 | |
| Majority | | 454 | | |
| Turnout | | 8,433 | 71 | |
| Liberal Democrats hold | | Swing | | |

=== May 2014 ===
2014
| Party | Candidate | Votes | % | ±% |
|---|---|---|---|---|
| Liberal Democrats | Iain Roberts | 2,176 | 45% | +2.48% |
| Conservative | Graham Michael Haslam | 1078 | 22% | −15.08% |
| Labour | Colin Owen | 781 | 16% | −4.40% |
| UKIP | Grahame Daniel Bradbury | 630 | 13% | N/A |
| Green | Natasha Maria Brooks | 216 | 4% | N/A |
| Majority | | 1098 | 23% | +17.55 |
| Turnout | | 4881 | | |
| Liberal Democrats hold | | Swing | | |

=== May 2012 ===
2012
| Party | Candidate | Votes | % | ±% |
|---|---|---|---|---|
| Liberal Democrats | Keith Holloway | 2,030 | 42.52 | −2.92 |
| Conservative | Mick Jones | 1,770 | 37.08 | −8.72 |
| Labour | Colin Owen | 974 | 20.40 | +11.64 |
| Majority | | 260 | 5.45 | |
| Turnout | | 4,800 | 41.33 | |
| Liberal Democrats gain from Conservative | | Swing | | |

=== May 2011 ===
2011
| Party | Candidate | Votes | % | ±% |
|---|---|---|---|---|
| Liberal Democrats | Pam King | 2,153 | 40.0 | −13.0 |
| Conservative | Julie Smith-Jones | 2,063 | 38.3 | +2.0 |
| Labour | Colin Owen | 1,143 | 21.2 | +10.8 |
| Majority | | 90 | | |
| Turnout | | 5,383 | 46.53 | |
| Liberal Democrats hold | | Swing | | |
