= Stockport Metropolitan Borough Council elections =

Local government elections in Greater Manchester, England

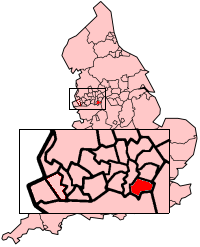
The Metropolitan Borough of Stockport shown within England.

Stockport Metropolitan Borough Council elections are generally held three years out of every four, with a third of the council being elected each time. Stockport Metropolitan Borough Council is the local authority for the metropolitan borough of Metropolitan Borough of Stockport in Greater Manchester, England. Since the last boundary changes in 2023, 63 councillors have been elected from 21 wards.

== Council elections ==
- 1973 election
- 1975 election
- 1976 election
- 1978 election
- 1979 election
- 1980 election
- 1982 election
- 1983 election
- 1984 election
- 1986 election
- 1987 election
- 1988 election
- 1990 election
- 1991 election
- 1992 election
- 1994 election
- 1995 election
- 1996 election
- 1998 election
- 1999 election
- 2000 election
- 2002 election
- 2003 election
- 2004 election (Note: Whole council elected following ward boundary changes.)
- 2006 election
- 2007 election
- 2008 election
- 2010 election
- 2011 election
- 2012 election
- 2014 election
- 2015 election
- 2016 election
- 2018 election
- 2019 election
- 2021 election (Note: Elections originally scheduled for 2020 but were suspended for a year due to the COVID-19 pandemic)
- 2022 election
- 2023 election
- 2024 election
- 2026 election

== Borough result maps ==
2004 results map

2006 results map

2007 results map

2008 results map

2010 results map

2011 results map

2012 results map

2014 results map

2015 results map

2016 results map

2018 results map

2019 results map

2021 results map

2022 results map

2023 results map

2024 results map

2026 results map

== By-election results ==
=== 1998-2002 ===
Cheadle Hulme South by-election 10 September 1998
Party	Candidate	Votes	%	±%
Liberal Democrats		2,264	65.2	+14.4
Conservative		1,048	30.2	+4.7
Labour		161	4.6	−19.1
Majority		1,218	35.0	
Turnout		3,473	31.3	
Liberal Democrats hold		Swing		

=== 2002-2006 ===
Manor by-election 17 October 2002
Party	Candidate	Votes	%	±%
Liberal Democrats		1,015	46.0	−0.7
Labour		975	44.2	+4.2
Conservative		165	7.5	−1.4
UKIP		53	2.4	+2.4
Majority		40	1.8	
Turnout		2,208	23.5	
Liberal Democrats hold		Swing		

Cheadle Hulme South by-election 17 July 2003
Party	Candidate	Votes	%	±%
Liberal Democrats		1,830	51.9	−1.2
Conservative		1,458	41.3	+3.1
Labour		143	4.1	−4.6
UKIP		97	2.7	+2.7
Majority		372	10.6	
Turnout		3,528	31.4	
Liberal Democrats hold		Swing		

=== 2006-2010 ===
Stepping Hill by-election 11 June 2009
Party	Candidate	Votes	%	±%
Liberal Democrats	Wendy E. Orrell	1,779	47.4	−6.1
Conservative	J.D. Wright	1,336	35.6	−1.0
UKIP	G. Price	257	6.8	+6.8
Labour	J.M. Rothwell	225	6.0	−0.0
Green	P. Shaw	158	4.2	+0.3
Majority		443	11.8	
Turnout		3,775	38.7	
Liberal Democrats hold		Swing		

Reddish North by-election 23 July 2009
Party	Candidate	Votes	%	±%
Labour	David Wilson	1,218	49.5	+1.0
Conservative	Gareth Butler	403	16.4	−8.9
UKIP	Gerald Price	342	13.9	+13.9
Liberal Democrats	Norman Beverley	303	12.3	+0.7
BNP	Paul Bennett	195	7.9	−6.6
Majority		815	33.1	
Turnout		2,461	23.5	
Labour hold		Swing		

Cheadle and Gatley by-election 10 September 2009
Party	Candidate	Votes	%	±%
Liberal Democrats	Iain Roberts	2,625	52.9	+7.5
Conservative	J Smith-Jones	2,005	40.4	−5.4
Labour	K Priestley	143	2.9	−5.9
UKIP	D Perry	96	1.9	+1.9
Green	D Leaver	91	1.8	+1.8
Majority		620	12.5	
Turnout		4,960	43.9	
Liberal Democrats hold		Swing		

=== 2014-2018 ===
Bramhall South and Woodford by-election 20 November 2014
Party	Candidate	Votes	%	±%
Conservative	John McGahan	2,080	53.2	+8.2
Liberal Democrats	Jeremy Meal	1,502	38.4	+5.3
Green	David McDonough	197	5.0	+5.0
Labour	Kathryn Priestley	132	3.4	−5.5
Majority		578	14.8	
Turnout		3,911	39.5	
Conservative hold		Swing		

Brinnington and Central by-election 8 June 2017
Party	Candidate	Votes	%	±%
Labour	Becky Crawford	3,877	75.0	−2.1
Conservative	Ros Lloyd	875	16.9	+5.8
Liberal Democrats	Alex Orndal	193	3.7	+3.7
Green	James Pelham	170	3.3	−8.5
Old Swan Against the Cuts	John Pearson	56	1.1	+1.1
Majority		3,002	55.1	
Turnout		5,190	48.4	
Labour hold		Swing		

=== 2018-2022 ===
Hazel Grove by-election 1 August 2019
Party	Candidate	Votes	%	±%
Liberal Democrats	Charles Gibson	1,401	45.7	−2.0
Conservative	Oliver Johnstone	1,194	38.9	+9.6
Labour	Julie Wharton	329	10.7	−0.2
Green	Michael Padfield	142	4.6	+0.2
Majority		207	6.8	
Turnout		3,066		
Liberal Democrats hold		Swing		

=== 2022-2026 ===
Edgeley and Cheadle Heath by-election 13 October 2022
Party	Candidate	Votes	%	±%
Labour	Georgia Lynott	1,172	53.0	
Liberal Democrats	Robbie Cowbury	840	38.0	
Green	Philip Handscomb	200	9.0	
Majority		332	15.0	
Turnout		2,238	21.1	
Labour hold		Swing		

Bredbury Green and Romiley by-election 17 October 2024
Party	Candidate	Votes	%	±%
Liberal Democrats	Rachel Bresnahan	1,506	65.8	
Conservative	Pat Bentley	552	24.1	
Labour	Papa Andoh-Kweku	127	5.5	
Green	Stephanie Wyatt	104	4.5	
Majority		954	41.7	
Turnout		2,302	21.5	
Liberal Democrats hold		Swing		

Cheadle West and Gatley by-election 17 October 2024
Party	Candidate	Votes	%	±%
Liberal Democrats	Huma Khan	1,159	45.1	
Conservative	Michael Fox	553	21.5	
Labour	Dan Farley	517	20.1	
Green	Alexander Drury	341	13.3	
Majority		606	23.6	
Turnout		2,579	22.0	
Liberal Democrats hold		Swing		

Bramhall South and Woodford by-election 31 October 2024
Party	Candidate	Votes	%	±%
Conservative	Peter Crossen	1,909	47.9	
Liberal Democrats	Sandeep Kashyap	1,733	43.5	
Reform	John Howard Kelly	133	3.3	
Labour	Jake Thomas	115	2.9	
Green	Andrew Dearden	95	2.4	
Majority		176	0.4	
Turnout		3,989	37.0	
Conservative gain from Liberal Democrats		Swing		
