= 1979 Stockport Metropolitan Borough Council election =

Local election in Stockport

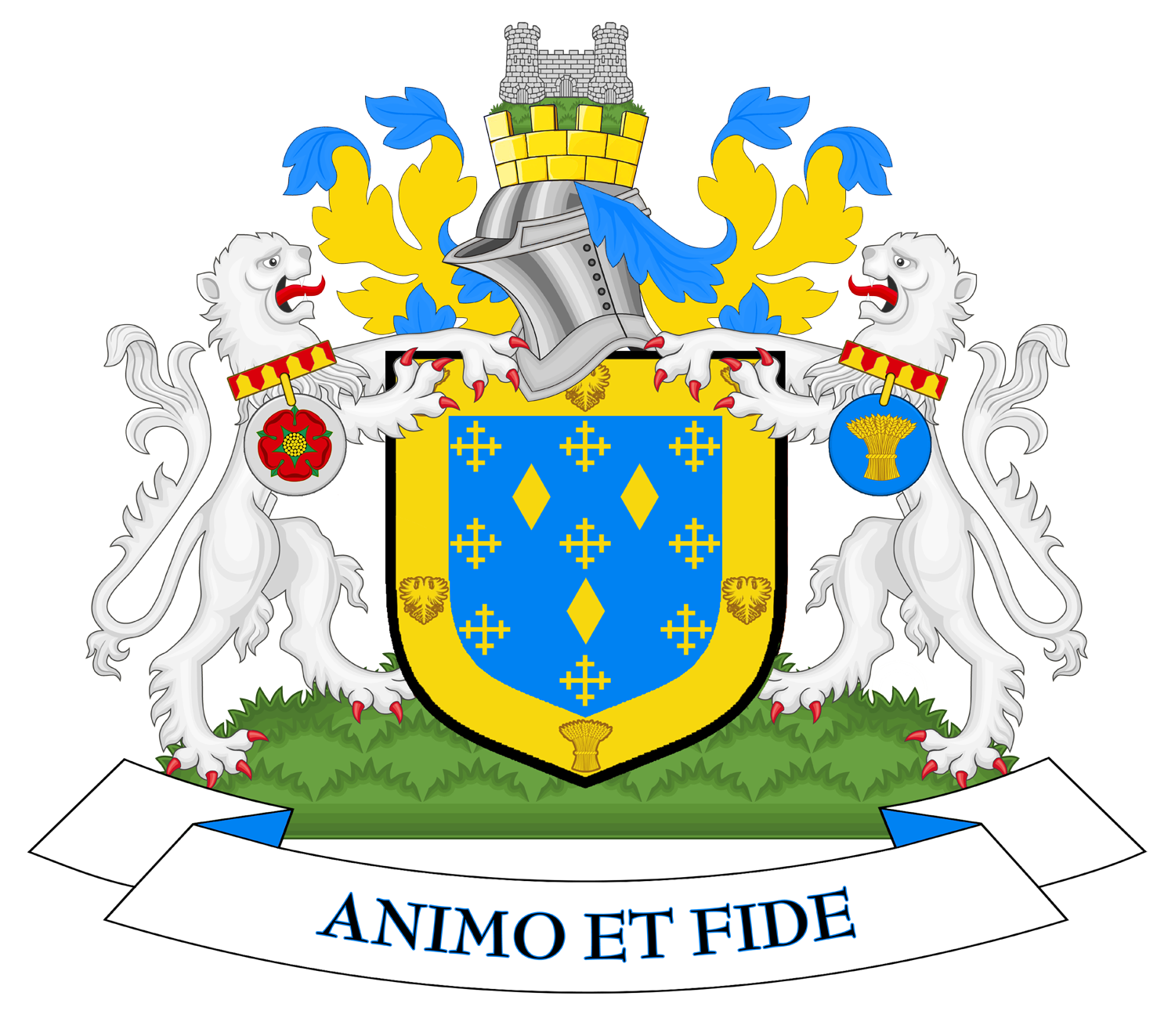
← 1978	3 May 1979	1980 →

20 of 60 seats to Stockport Metropolitan Borough Council 31 seats needed for a majority
	First party	Second party	Third party
Leader	John Lloyd	Bernard Bradbury	Ken Anstis
Party	Conservative	Labour	Liberal
Leader's seat	Heaton Moor & Heaton Chapel	Reddish Green & Longford	Cheadle Hulme North & Adswood
Last election	11 seats, 49.9%	6 seats, 25.5%	2 seats, 22.1%
Seats before	39	13	5
Seats won	11	6	2
Seats after	35	16	6
Seat change	▼4	▲3	▲1
Popular vote	78,558	46,047	42,542
Percentage	45.3%	26.6%	24.6%
Swing	▼4.6%	▲1.1%	▲2.5%
	Fourth party
Leader	Robert Crook
Party	Heald Green Ratepayers
Leader's seat	Heald Green
Last election	1 seat, 2.4%
Seats before	3
Seats won	1
Seats after	3
Seat change	Steady
Popular vote	5,148
Percentage	3.0%
Swing	▲0.6%
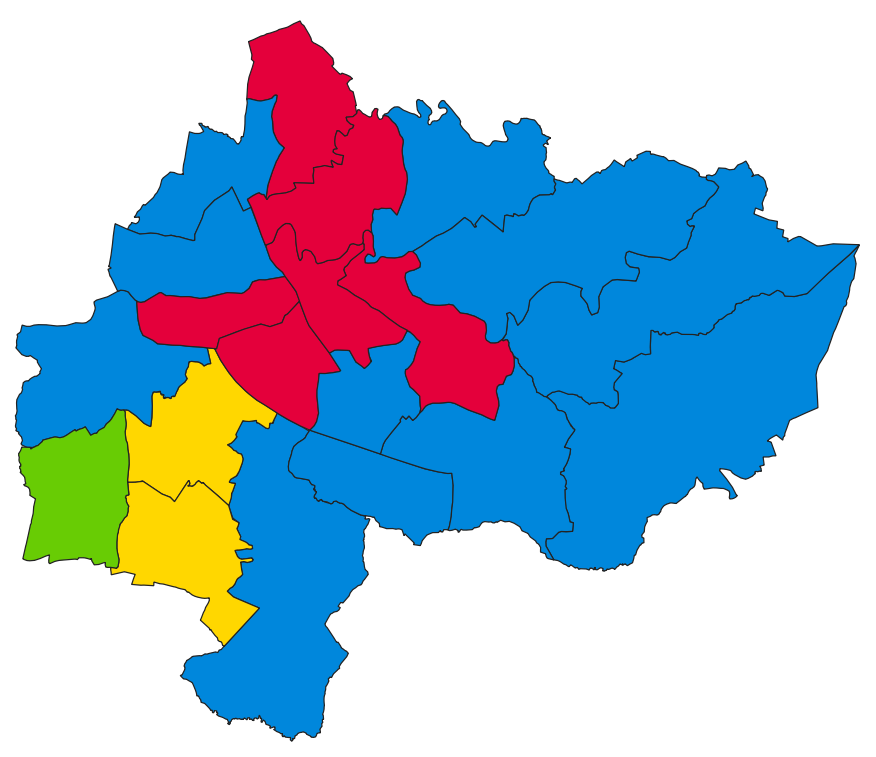
- Map of results of 1979 election
Leader of the Council before election
John Lloyd
Conservative
Leader of the Council after election
John Lloyd
Conservative

Elections to Stockport Council were held on Thursday, 3 May 1979, on the same day as the 1979 UK general election. One third of the council was up for election, with each successful candidate to serve a four-year term of office, expiring in 1983. The Conservative Party retained overall control of the council.

== Election result ==
Party	Votes		Seats			Full Council	
Conservative Party	78,558 (45.3%)	▼4.6	11 (55.0%)	11 / 20	▼3	35 (58.3%)	35 / 60
Labour Party	46,047 (26.6%)	▲1.1	6 (30.0%)	6 / 20	▲3	16 (26.7%)	16 / 60
Liberal Party	42,542 (24.6%)	▲2.5	2 (10.0%)	2 / 20	▲1	6 (10.0%)	6 / 60
Heald Green Ratepayers	5,148 (3.0%)	▲0.6	1 (5.0%)	1 / 20	Steady	3 (5.0%)	3 / 60
Independent	383 (0.2%)	N/A	0 (0.0%)	0 / 20	N/A	0 (0.0%)	0 / 60
Communist	288 (0.2%)	▲0.1	0 (0.0%)	0 / 20	Steady	0 (0.0%)	0 / 60
Residents	268 (0.2%)	N/A	0 (0.0%)	0 / 20	N/A	0 (0.0%)	0 / 60

↓
16	6	3	35

== Ward results ==
=== No.1 (Brinnington & Lancashire Hill) ===
Brinnington & Lancashire Hill
Party	Candidate	Votes	%	±%
Labour	C. MacAlister*	5,992	61.6	−4.2
Conservative	J. Harris	2,690	27.7	−1.3
Liberal	B. Hall	1,045	10.7	+5.5
Majority		3,302	33.9	−2.9
Turnout		9,727	73.5	+39.5
Labour hold		Swing		

=== No.2 (Manor & Little Moor) ===
Manor & Little Moor
Party	Candidate	Votes	%	±%
Labour	J. Tucker*	2,980	46.4	−2.5
Conservative	B. Skitt	2,588	40.3	+1.8
Liberal	B. Tuck	851	13.3	+0.7
Majority		392	6.1	−4.3
Turnout		6,419	76.6	+40.9
Labour hold		Swing		

=== No.3 (Vernon & Offerton) ===
Vernon & Offerton
Party	Candidate	Votes	%	±%
Labour	W. McCann	3,557	42.2	−4.2
Conservative	E. Williamson	3,509	41.7	−2.7
Liberal	E. Fantom	1,353	16.1	+6.9
Majority		48	0.5	−1.5
Turnout		8,419	78.0	+43.0
Labour gain from Conservative		Swing		

=== No.4 (Heaviley & Davenport) ===
Heaviley & Davenport
Party	Candidate	Votes	%	±%
Conservative	B. Haley*	4,697	54.4	−10.8
Labour	C. Gill	2,187	25.3	+1.0
Liberal	R. Quayle	1,757	20.3	+9.8
Majority		2,510	29.1	−11.8
Turnout		8,641	79.5	+40.8
Conservative hold		Swing		

=== No.5 (Adswood & Cale Green) ===
Adswood & Cale Green
Party	Candidate	Votes	%	±%
Labour	H. Peters	3,960	47.7	−4.3
Conservative	I. Roberts*	3,183	38.3	−0.9
Liberal	J. Rees	950	11.4	+5.8
Independent	K. Walker	215	2.6	N/A
Majority		777	9.4	−3.4
Turnout		8,308	71.6	+36.5
Labour gain from Conservative		Swing		

=== No.6 (Edgeley & Cheadle Heath) ===
Edgeley & Cheadle Heath
Party	Candidate	Votes	%	±%
Labour	A. Endsor	3,344	40.1	−5.2
Liberal	J. Hartley	2,417	29.0	+2.2
Conservative	J. Walsh	2,149	25.7	−2.2
Residents	S. Howell	268	3.2	N/A
Independent	W. Statham	168	2.0	N/A
Majority		927	11.1	−6.3
Turnout		8,346	75.8	+30.5
Labour hold		Swing		

=== No.7 (Heaton Mersey & Heaton Norris) ===
Heaton Mersey & Heaton Norris
Party	Candidate	Votes	%	±%
Conservative	V. Burgon*	5,651	55.3	−7.4
Labour	J. Hooke	3,149	30.8	+0.5
Liberal	J. Rigby	1,410	13.8	+6.8
Majority		2,502	24.5	−7.9
Turnout		10,210	78.5	+37.2
Conservative hold		Swing		

=== No.8 (Heaton Moor & Heaton Chapel) ===
Heaton Moor & Heaton Chapel
Party	Candidate	Votes	%	±%
Conservative	W. Knight*	4,853	51.3	−0.7
Labour	T. Broome	2,886	30.5	+1.4
Liberal	G. Fenton	1,720	18.2	−0.7
Majority		1,967	20.8	−2.1
Turnout		7,459	79.3	+37.6
Conservative hold		Swing		

=== No.9 (Reddish Green & Longford) ===
Reddish Green & Longford
Party	Candidate	Votes	%	±%
Labour	B. Bradbury*	4,996	52.4	−6.2
Conservative	D. Lloyd	3,329	34.9	−1.8
Liberal	D. Swindley	927	9.7	+6.2
Communist	N. Bourne	288	3.0	+1.7
Majority		1,667	17.5	−4.4
Turnout		9,540	77.5	+33.0
Labour hold		Swing		

=== No.10 (Bredbury Goyt) ===
Bredbury Goyt
Party	Candidate	Votes	%	±%
Conservative	J. Howe*	4,433	48.2	−10.2
Liberal	L. Rice	2,509	27.3	+5.7
Labour	W. Prince	2,253	24.5	+4.5
Majority		1,924	20.9	−15.9
Turnout		9,195	79.4	+38.7
Conservative hold		Swing		

=== No.11 (Bredbury Tame) ===
Bredbury Tame
Party	Candidate	Votes	%	±%
Conservative	K. Greenhough*	3,140	37.4	−7.5
Labour	K. Bagnall	2,957	35.2	+0.4
Liberal	D. Humphries	2,292	27.3	+7.0
Majority		183	2.2	−7.9
Turnout		8,389	80.7	+36.9
Conservative hold		Swing		

=== No.12 (Heald Green) ===
Heald Green
Party	Candidate	Votes	%	±%
Heald Green Ratepayers	N. Fields*	5,148	59.6	+16.2
Conservative	A. Roney	2,379	27.6	−14.1
Liberal	A. Sinclair	570	6.6	+1.3
Labour	A. Mawhinney	537	6.2	−3.4
Majority		2,769	32.1	+30.4
Turnout		8,634	80.5	+31.9
Heald Green Ratepayers hold		Swing		

=== No.13 (Cheadle & Gatley) ===
Cheadle & Gatley
Party	Candidate	Votes	%	±%
Conservative	L. Singer*	6,489	61.7	−2.0
Liberal	J. Allan	2,967	28.2	+0.1
Labour	M. Lawley	1,069	10.2	+2.0
Majority		3,522	33.5	−2.1
Turnout		10,525	80.6	+31.6
Conservative hold		Swing		

=== No.14 (Cheadle Hulme South) ===
Cheadle Hulme South
Party	Candidate	Votes	%	±%
Liberal	L. G. Bayley*	3,971	51.2	−6.8
Conservative	T. Radcliffe	3,361	43.3	+5.4
Labour	L. Lawrence	426	5.5	+1.4
Majority		610	7.9	−12.2
Turnout		7,758	83.4	+32.9
Liberal hold		Swing		

=== No.15 (Cheadle Hulme North & Adswood) ===
Cheadle Hulme North & Adswood
Party	Candidate	Votes	%	±%
Liberal	J. Pantall	4,480	47.1	−0.5
Conservative	A. Grisenthwaite*	3,851	40.5	−0.5
Labour	P. Scott	1,188	12.5	+1.1
Majority		629	6.6	0
Turnout		9,519	80.0	+33.8
Liberal gain from Conservative		Swing		

=== No.16 (Torkington & Norbury) ===
Torkington & Norbury
Party	Candidate	Votes	%	±%
Conservative	D. West	4,789	49.2	−5.8
Liberal	D. Robinson	3,607	37.1	+4.2
Labour	J. Vosper	1,339	13.8	+1.7
Majority		1,182	12.1	−10.0
Turnout		9,735	80.5	+34.9
Conservative hold		Swing		

=== No.17 (Ladybrook) ===
Ladybrook
Party	Candidate	Votes	%	±%
Conservative	C. Gibson*	3,071	59.0	−3.6
Liberal	J. Hart	1,725	33.1	+0.9
Labour	P. Gray	408	7.8	+2.6
Majority		1,346	25.9	−4.5
Turnout		5,204	85.2	+30.2
Conservative hold		Swing		

=== No.18 (Park & Pownall) ===
Park & Pownall
Party	Candidate	Votes	%	±%
Conservative	R. Peuleve*	6,368	61.1	−2.8
Liberal	W. Littlehales	3,129	30.0	+0.8
Labour	G. Lomax	919	8.8	+1.9
Majority		3,239	31.1	−3.6
Turnout		10,416	82.8	+34.8
Conservative hold		Swing		

=== No.19 (Marple) ===
Marple
Party	Candidate	Votes	%	±%
Conservative	J. Headridge*	4,185	54.8	−2.4
Liberal	J. Facer-Smith	2,246	29.4	−1.2
Labour	M. Stevens	1,206	15.8	+3.6
Majority		1,939	25.4	−1.2
Turnout		7,637	81.2	+34.8
Conservative hold		Swing		

=== No.20 (Mellor & High Lane) ===
Mellor & High Lane
Party	Candidate	Votes	%	±%
Conservative	A. Finnie*	3,843	53.7	−10.4
Liberal	D. Brailsford	2,616	36.6	+10.0
Labour	W. Watson	694	9.7	+0.4
Majority		1,227	17.2	−20.3
Turnout		7,153	82.0	+33.7
Conservative hold		Swing		
