= 1973 Stockport Metropolitan Borough Council election =

Local election in Stockport

1973 Stockport Metropolitan Borough Council Council election
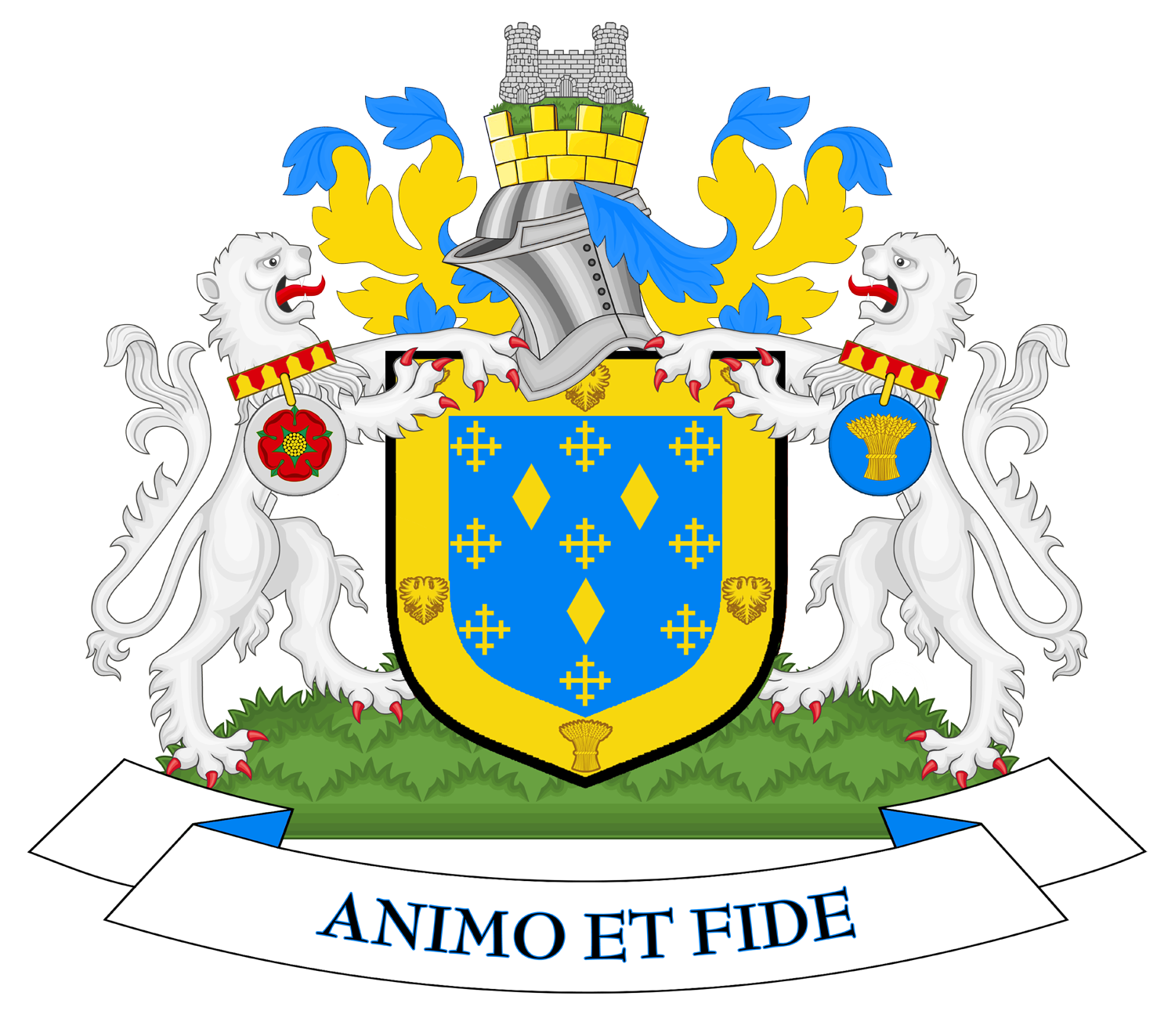
10 May 1973	1975 →

All 60 seats to Stockport Metropolitan Borough Council 31 seats needed for a majority
- Turnout

	First party	Second party	Third party
Leader	Walter Knight	Brian Slack	Ken Anstis
Party	Conservative	Labour	Liberal
Leader's seat	Heaton Moor & Heaton Chapel	Manor & Little Moor	Cheadle Hulme North & Adswood
Seats won	27	16	13
Popular vote	100,943	57,905	90,774
Percentage	38.8%	22.3%	34.9%
	Fourth party	Fifth party
Leader	Robert Crook	Robert Law
Party	Heald Green Ratepayers	Residents
Leader's seat	Heald Green	Cheadle Hulme South
Seats won	3	1
Popular vote	5,711	3,876
Percentage	2.2%	1.5%
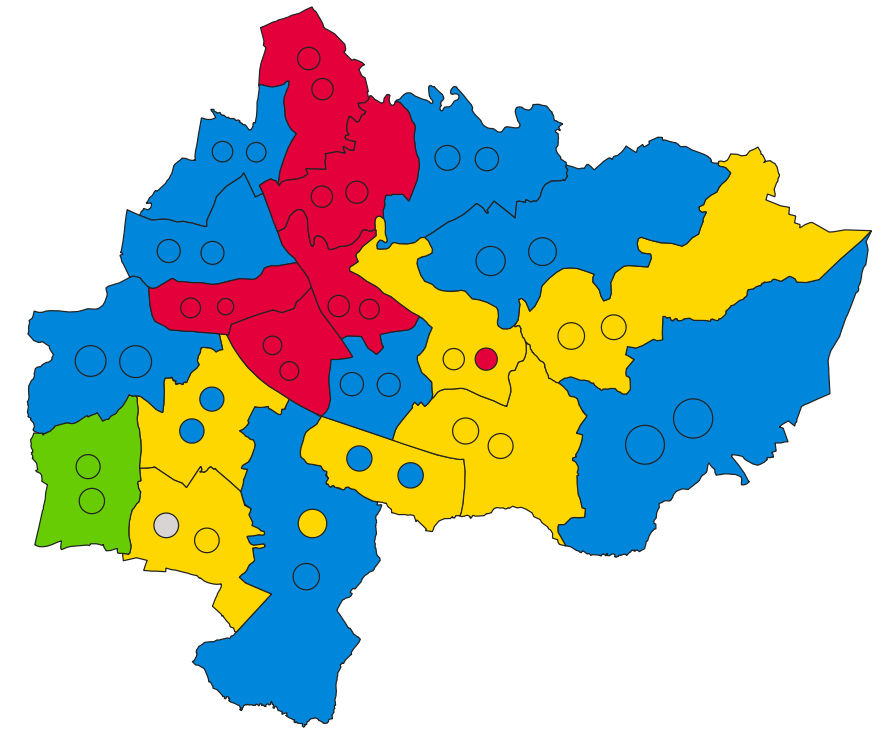
- Winner of each seat at the 1973 Stockport Metropolitan Borough Council election
Leader after election
Walter Knight
Conservative

The first elections to Stockport Council were held on Thursday, 10 May 1973. This was a new council created to replace Stockport County Borough, Bredbury and Romiley Urban District, Cheadle and Gatley Urban District, Hazel Grove and Bramhall Urban District, and Marple Urban District. This election would create the entire 60-member council, which would shadow its predecessor councils before taking over their functions on 1 April 1974, as specified in the Local Government Act 1972. Each 1st-placed candidate would serve a five-year term of office, expiring in 1978. Each 2nd-placed candidate would serve a three-year term of office, expiring in 1976. Each 3rd-placed candidate would serve a two-year term of office, expiring in 1975.

The council went into no overall control.

== Election result ==
Party	Votes	Seats	
Conservative Party	100,943 (38.8%)	27 (45.0%)	27 / 60
Labour Party	57,905 (22.3%)	16 (26.7%)	16 / 60
Liberal Party	90,774 (34.9%)	13 (21.7%)	13 / 60
Heald Green Ratepayers	5,711 (2.2%)	3 (5.0%)	3 / 60
Residents	3,876 (1.5%)	1 (1.7%)	1 / 60
Communist	751 (0.3%)	0 (0.0%)	0 / 60

↓
16	13	1	3	27

== Ward results ==
=== No.1 (Brinnington & Lancashire Hill) ===
Brinnington & Lancashire Hill
Party	Candidate	Votes	%	±%
Labour	K. Ford	2,128	60.4	
Labour	A. Bradbury	1,981	56.3	
Labour	D. T. Greene	1,922	54.6	
Liberal	J. D. Hunt	872	24.8	
Conservative	W. R. Thomson	750	21.3	
Conservative	R. Downs	740	21.0	
Conservative	D. Caldwell	725	20.6	
Liberal	J. Langrish	699	19.9	
Liberal	M. Clare	659	18.7	
Communist	I. Crawford	133	3.8	
Majority		1,050	29.8	
Turnout		3,521	25.9	
Labour win (new seat)				
Labour win (new seat)				
Labour win (new seat)				

=== No.2 (Manor & Little Moor) ===
Manor & Little Moor
Party	Candidate	Votes	%	±%
Labour	E. Leah	1,323	42.0	
Labour	G. B. Slack	1,296	41.2	
Labour	K. Parkin	1,277	40.6	
Conservative	J. C. Crowther	1,126	35.8	
Conservative	D. E. Bath	1,068	33.9	
Conservative	M. Hamilton	915	29.1	
Liberal	J. Clarney	876	27.8	
Liberal	E. Fantom	798	25.3	
Liberal	G. F. Fletcher	768	24.4	
Majority		151	4.8	
Turnout		3,149	33.6	
Labour win (new seat)				
Labour win (new seat)				
Labour win (new seat)				

=== No.3 (Vernon & Offerton) ===
Vernon & Offerton
Party	Candidate	Votes	%	±%
Liberal	C. J. Carter	1,212	39.8	
Liberal	R. Dearman	1,098	36.1	
Labour	M. Mendelson	1,085	35.6	
Liberal	V. Corner	1,060	34.8	
Labour	J. Vesey	1,013	33.3	
Labour	M. Marston	999	32.8	
Conservative	S. Brumat	892	29.3	
Conservative	A. Bennett	828	27.2	
Conservative	E. Williamson	812	26.7	
Communist	K. Marston	129	4.2	
Majority		25	0.8	
Turnout		3,042	34.3	
Liberal win (new seat)				
Liberal win (new seat)				
Labour win (new seat)				

=== No.4 (Heaviley & Davenport) ===
Heaviley & Davenport
Party	Candidate	Votes	%	±%
Conservative	L. Smith	2,046	50.7	
Conservative	H. Dodd	2,022	50.1	
Conservative	B. P. Howarth	1,956	48.5	
Liberal	J. S. Hosking	1,455	36.1	
Liberal	E. Prusmann	1,405	34.8	
Liberal	M. J. Holt	1,054	26.1	
Labour	A. J. Hodgson	759	18.8	
Labour	S. C. Rimmer	714	17.7	
Labour	P. G. Scott	693	17.2	
Majority		502	12.4	
Turnout		4,036	39.3	
Conservative win (new seat)				
Conservative win (new seat)				
Conservative win (new seat)				

=== No.5 (Adswood & Cale Green) ===
Adswood & Cale Green
Party	Candidate	Votes	%	±%
Labour	W. Cameron	1,907	48.2	
Labour	K. R. Brookes	1,857	46.9	
Labour	H. A. Walker	1,787	45.2	
Conservative	B. Haley	1,216	30.7	
Conservative	E. Howard	1,216	30.7	
Conservative	W. D. Holliday	1,212	30.6	
Liberal	A. Hodgson	954	24.1	
Liberal	J. Rees	869	22.0	
Liberal	B. Tuck	868	21.9	
Majority		571	14.5	
Turnout		3,957	33.3	
Labour win (new seat)				
Labour win (new seat)				
Labour win (new seat)				

=== No.6 (Edgeley & Cheadle Heath) ===
Edgeley & Cheadle Heath
Party	Candidate	Votes	%	±%
Labour	V. Holland	1,934	51.6	
Labour	R. Heys	1,898	50.6	
Labour	F. W. Ollier	1,875	50.0	
Conservative	T. F. Earley	1,431	38.2	
Conservative	M. S. Burgoyne	1,387	37.0	
Conservative	A. Murray	1,338	35.7	
Liberal	A. S. Sinclair	445	11.9	
Liberal	M. Walmsley	432	11.5	
Liberal	S. Carter	420	11.2	
Communist	V. M. Ohren	98	2.6	
Majority		444	11.8	
Turnout		3,750	31.5	
Labour win (new seat)				
Labour win (new seat)				
Labour win (new seat)				

=== No.7 (Heaton Mersey & Heaton Norris) ===
Heaton Mersey & Heaton Norris
Party	Candidate	Votes	%	±%
Conservative	J. H. Dickens	2,304	48.2	
Conservative	E. D. Foulkes	2,286	47.8	
Conservative	V. Burgon	2,284	47.8	
Liberal	C. R. Hicks	1,777	37.2	
Liberal	A. Cottam	1,301	27.2	
Liberal	W. R. Littlehales	1,086	22.7	
Labour	J. Boddy	1,085	22.7	
Labour	D. Robinson	1,039	21.7	
Labour	C. Orford	1,030	21.5	
Communist	B. Ainley	148	3.1	
Majority		507	10.6	
Turnout		4,782	41.4	
Conservative win (new seat)				
Conservative win (new seat)				
Conservative win (new seat)				

=== No.8 (Heaton Moor & Heaton Chapel) ===
Heaton Moor & Heaton Chapel
Party	Candidate	Votes	%	±%
Conservative	J. A. MacCarron	2,580	52.9	
Conservative	J. Lloyd	2,558	52.5	
Conservative	W. C. Knight	2,543	52.2	
Labour	A. J. Flood	1,484	30.4	
Labour	W. R. Fox	1,453	29.8	
Labour	E. Wood	1,384	28.4	
Liberal	M. Clark	912	18.7	
Liberal	E. Minns	805	16.5	
Liberal	W. R. Johnson	796	16.3	
Communist	J. Printy	123	2.5	
Majority		1,059	21.7	
Turnout		4,876	40.6	
Conservative win (new seat)				
Conservative win (new seat)				
Conservative win (new seat)				

=== No.9 (Reddish Green & Longford) ===
Reddish Green & Longford
Party	Candidate	Votes	%	±%
Labour	A. W. Verdeille	2,105	56.1	
Labour	C. A. Foster	2,038	54.3	
Labour	B. Bradbury	2,030	54.1	
Conservative	D. R. Willett	1,043	27.8	
Conservative	T. Thornley	1,036	27.6	
Conservative	A. A. Jones	980	26.1	
Liberal	E. Hunt	694	18.5	
Liberal	N. Fenton	634	16.9	
Liberal	P. A. Green	576	15.4	
Communist	N. Bourne	120	3.2	
Majority		987	26.3	
Turnout		3,751	31.7	
Labour win (new seat)				
Labour win (new seat)				
Labour win (new seat)				

=== No.10 (Bredbury Goyt) ===
Bredbury Goyt
Party	Candidate	Votes	%	±%
Conservative	M. Greenwood	2,216	43.8	
Conservative	H. B. Whitehead	2,171	42.9	
Conservative	J. G. Howe	2,167	42.8	
Liberal	H. D. McKell	1,916	37.9	
Liberal	D. Guinnane	1,888	37.3	
Liberal	B. Beagley	1,860	36.8	
Labour	C. Ryder	1,035	20.5	
Labour	J. P. E. Howard	1,023	20.2	
Labour	R. Perringo	917	18.1	
Majority		251	5.0	
Turnout		5,060	45.6	
Conservative win (new seat)				
Conservative win (new seat)				
Conservative win (new seat)				

=== No.11 (Bredbury Tame) ===
Bredbury Tame
Party	Candidate	Votes	%	±%
Conservative	G. C. Stanway	1,729	38.2	
Conservative	R. E. Walker	1,673	37.0	
Conservative	K. H. Greenhough	1,661	36.7	
Liberal	S. Hall	1,553	34.3	
Liberal	M. Bird	1,479	32.7	
Liberal	M. Knight	1,440	31.8	
Labour	P. C. Snape	1,398	30.9	
Labour	B. Hughes	1,346	29.7	
Labour	H. D. Brown	1,307	28.9	
Majority		108	2.4	
Turnout		4,527	44.0	
Conservative win (new seat)				
Conservative win (new seat)				
Conservative win (new seat)				

=== No.12 (Heald Green) ===
Heald Green
Party	Candidate	Votes	%	±%
Heald Green Ratepayers	R. G. Crook	2,014	46.4	
Heald Green Ratepayers	R. Stenson	1,917	44.2	
Heald Green Ratepayers	N. Fields	1,780	41.0	
Liberal	O. Lawton	1,254	28.9	
Liberal	P. V. Porgess	1,248	28.8	
Liberal	J. Allan	1,233	28.4	
Conservative	E. A. Grinyer	830	19.1	
Conservative	M. Campbell	792	18.3	
Conservative	M. Grinyer	738	17.0	
Labour	J. Becker	456	10.5	
Labour	R. W. Seedhouse	376	8.7	
Labour	G. R. Knight	369	8.5	
Majority		526	12.1	
Turnout		4,338	43.0	
Heald Green Ratepayers win (new seat)				
Heald Green Ratepayers win (new seat)				
Heald Green Ratepayers win (new seat)				

=== No.13 (Cheadle & Gatley) ===
Cheadle & Gatley
Party	Candidate	Votes	%	±%
Conservative	B. Johnson	3,200	51.2	
Conservative	F. H. Bishop	3,021	48.3	
Conservative	L. I. Singer	2,901	46.4	
Liberal	L. E. Foulger	2,837	45.3	
Liberal	M. J. Anstey	2,714	43.4	
Liberal	J. B. Robins	2,648	42.3	
Labour	J. Lamerick	528	8.4	
Labour	M. Legg	494	7.9	
Labour	K. E. Worrall	434	6.9	
Majority		64	1.1	
Turnout		6,256	46.9	
Conservative win (new seat)				
Conservative win (new seat)				
Conservative win (new seat)				

=== No.14 (Cheadle Hulme South) ===
Cheadle Hulme South
Party	Candidate	Votes	%	±%
Liberal	A. B. Leah	1,358	36.0	
Residents	R. A. Law	1,331	35.3	
Liberal	P. Davis	1,318	34.9	
Residents	R. F. Dalton	1,296	34.3	
Liberal	J. A. Tovey	1,288	34.1	
Residents	C. D. Goode	1,249	33.1	
Conservative	V. C. James	992	26.3	
Conservative	E. D. Minshull	969	25.7	
Conservative	A. Ward	929	24.6	
Labour	H. Low	212	5.6	
Labour	C. Campbell	190	5.0	
Labour	H. Saunders	186	4.9	
Majority		22	0.6	
Turnout		3,773	46.2	
Liberal win (new seat)				
Residents win (new seat)				
Liberal win (new seat)				

=== No.15 (Cheadle Hulme North & Adswood) ===
Cheadle Hulme North & Adswood
Party	Candidate	Votes	%	±%
Liberal	K. G. Anstis	2,356	45.9	
Conservative	B. L. Thompson	2,182	42.6	
Conservative	A. Grisenthwaite	2,168	42.3	
Conservative	J. M. Walsh	2,161	42.1	
Liberal	M. Gowland	2,124	41.4	
Liberal	N. L. Hall	2,026	39.5	
Labour	N. Whittaker	867	16.9	
Labour	T. Willard	760	14.8	
Labour	A. Turner	756	14.7	
Majority		7	0.2	
Turnout		5,128	43.5	
Liberal win (new seat)				
Conservative win (new seat)				
Conservative win (new seat)				

=== No.16 (Torkington & Norbury) ===
Torkington & Norbury
Party	Candidate	Votes	%	±%
Liberal	D. E. Box	3,026	58.2	
Liberal	M. Hendley	2,979	57.3	
Liberal	H. Burrows	2,962	57.0	
Conservative	T. Peace	1,874	36.1	
Conservative	M. Scott	1,811	34.9	
Conservative	D. Harrison	1,725	33.2	
Labour	E. Brindley	504	9.7	
Labour	R. McKnight	373	7.2	
Labour	W. Morris	340	6.5	
Majority		1,088	20.9	
Turnout		5,196	44.0	
Liberal win (new seat)				
Liberal win (new seat)				
Liberal win (new seat)				

=== No.17 (Ladybrook) ===
Ladybrook
Party	Candidate	Votes	%	±%
Liberal	J. M. Ashworth	1,511	51.5	
Conservative	J. Timmins Fletcher	1,443	49.2	
Conservative	A. W. Chapman	1,405	47.9	
Liberal	J. L. Warrington	1,388	47.3	
Liberal	B. Massey	1,369	46.6	
Conservative	H. Gardiner	1,359	46.3	
Labour	B. Hodgson	122	4.2	
Labour	E. Pollard	113	3.9	
Labour	G. Scott	98	3.3	
Majority		17	0.6	
Turnout		2,935	52.9	
Liberal win (new seat)				
Conservative win (new seat)				
Conservative win (new seat)				

=== No.18 (Park & Pownall) ===
Park & Pownall
Party	Candidate	Votes	%	±%
Conservative	J. B. Leck	2,917	50.3	
Liberal	P. N. Borrow	2,829	48.8	
Conservative	R. L. Peuleve	2,828	48.8	
Liberal	H. F. Ridley	2,807	48.4	
Conservative	R. H. Vincent	2,778	47.9	
Liberal	S. Langrish	2,712	46.8	
Labour	A. Everett	187	3.2	
Labour	G. E. Bingham	186	3.2	
Labour	J. C. Gidman	156	2.7	
Majority		21	0.4	
Turnout		5,798	50.6	
Conservative win (new seat)				
Liberal win (new seat)				
Conservative win (new seat)				

=== No.19 (Marple) ===
Marple
Party	Candidate	Votes	%	±%
Liberal	J. A. Crofton	2,206	48.9	
Liberal	J. Brady	2,205	48.9	
Liberal	G. Gribble	2,018	44.8	
Conservative	D. J. Headridge	1,878	41.7	
Conservative	R. J. Chronnell	1,689	37.5	
Conservative	D. Lomas	1,495	33.2	
Labour	J. E. Yarwood	785	17.4	
Labour	E. Daley	672	14.9	
Labour	D. A. Burke	590	13.1	
Majority		140	3.1	
Turnout		4,509	51.5	
Liberal win (new seat)				
Liberal win (new seat)				
Liberal win (new seat)				

=== No.20 (Mellor & High Lane) ===
Mellor & High Lane
Party	Candidate	Votes	%	±%
Conservative	J. H. Cooke	2,009	47.4	
Conservative	C. F. Mason	1,969	46.5	
Conservative	A. W. Finnie	1,969	46.5	
Liberal	A. S. Bell	1,946	46.0	
Liberal	P. G. Reed	1,892	44.7	
Liberal	L. Arrandale	1,859	43.9	
Labour	R. Barstow	358	8.5	
Labour	H. J. Abrams	355	8.4	
Labour	W. J. Lloyd	350	8.2	
Majority		23	0.5	
Turnout		4,235	49.0	
Conservative win (new seat)				
Conservative win (new seat)				
Conservative win (new seat)				
