= 1976 Stockport Metropolitan Borough Council election =

Local election in Stockport

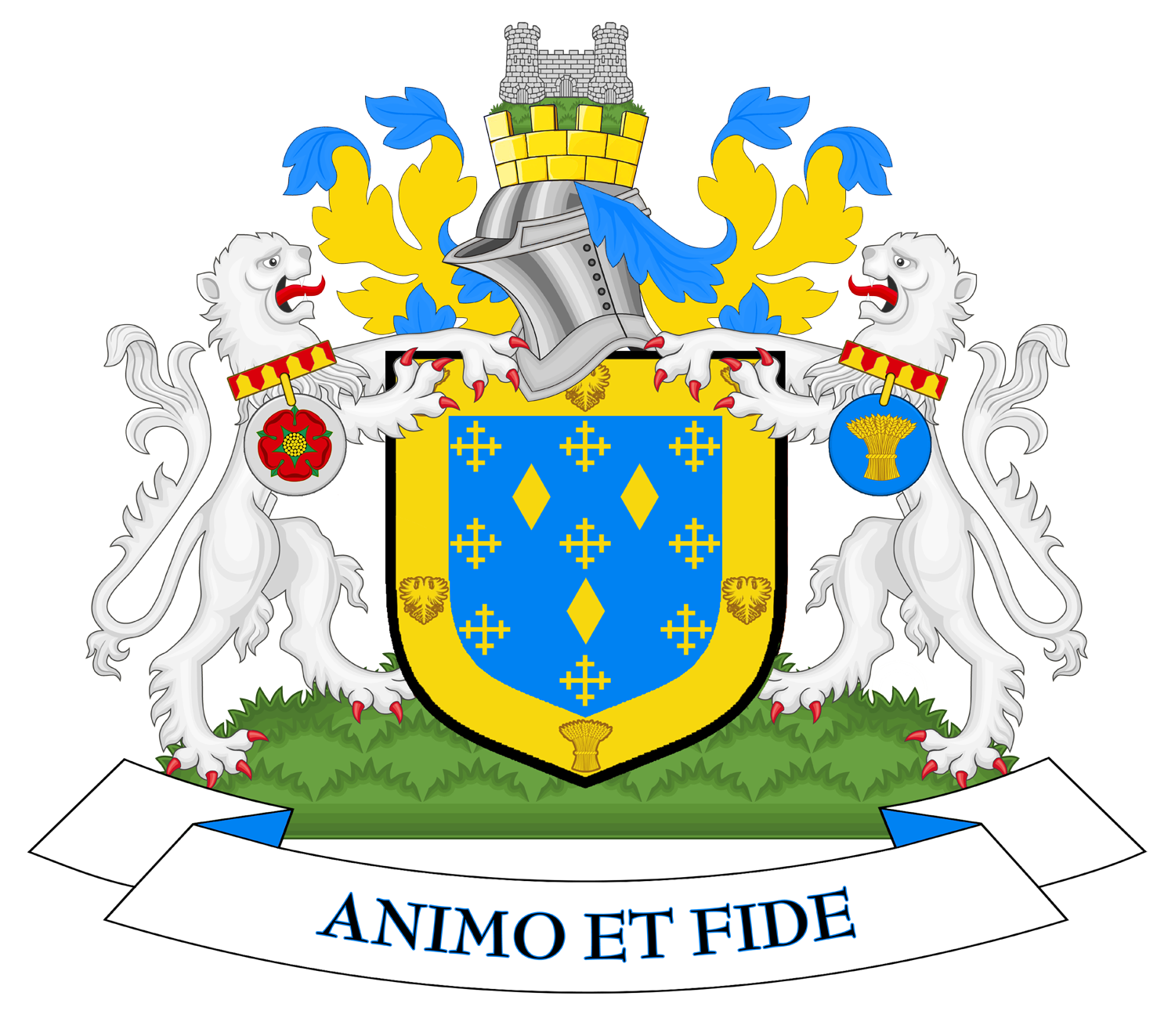
← 1975	6 May 1976	1978 →

20 of 60 seats to Stockport Metropolitan Borough Council 31 seats needed for a majority
	First party	Second party	Third party
Leader	Walter Knight	Bernard Bradbury	Ken Anstis
Party	Conservative	Labour	Liberal
Leader's seat	Heaton Moor & Heaton Chapel	Reddish Green & Longford	Cheadle Hulme North & Adswood
Last election	17 seats, 52.2%	2 seats, 18.0%	0 seats, 25.2%
Seats before	34	12	10
Seats won	14	4	1
Seats after	39	11	7
Seat change	▲5	▼1	▼3
Popular vote	48,659	20,740	24,120
Percentage	49.7%	21.2%	24.6%
Swing	▼2.5%	▲3.2%	▼0.6%
	Fourth party
Leader	Robert Crook
Party	Heald Green Ratepayers
Leader's seat	Heald Green
Last election	1 seat, 2.5%
Seats before	3
Seats won	1
Seats after	3
Seat change	Steady
Popular vote	2,713
Percentage	2.8%
Swing	▲0.3%
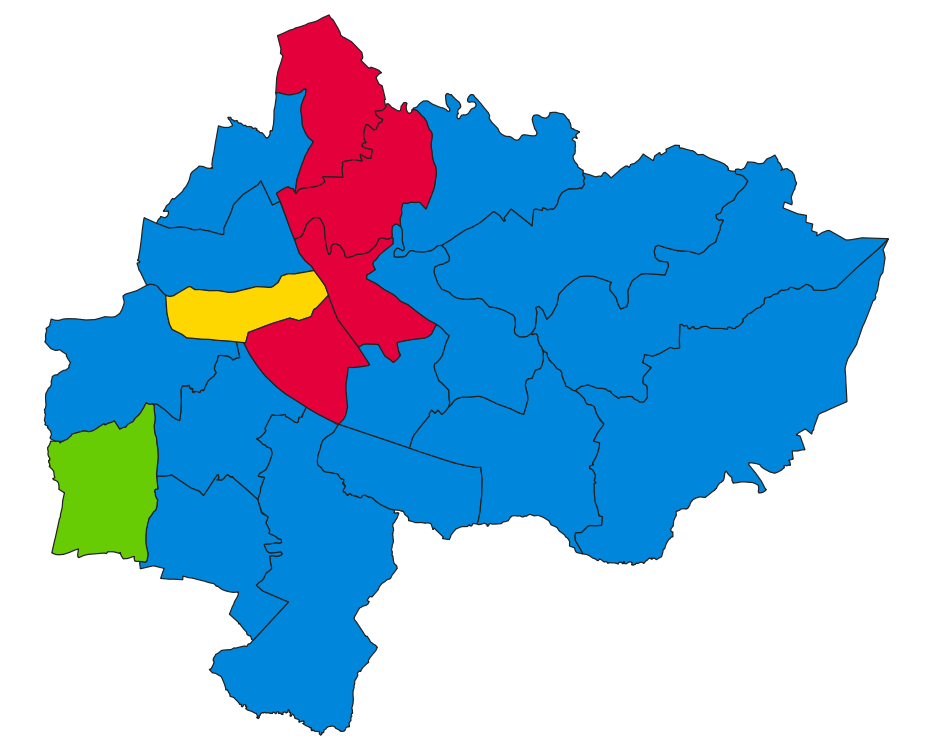
- Map of results of 1976 election
Leader of the Council before election
Walter Knight
Conservative
Leader of the Council after election
Walter Knight
Conservative

Elections to Stockport Council were held on Thursday, 6 May 1976. One third of the council was up for election, with each successful candidate to serve a four-year term of office, expiring in 1980. The Conservative Party retained overall control of the council.

== Election result ==
Party	Votes		Seats			Full Council	
Conservative Party	48,659 (49.7%)	▼2.5	14 (70.0%)	14 / 20	▲5	39 (65.0%)	39 / 60
Labour Party	20,740 (21.2%)	▲3.2	4 (20.0%)	4 / 20	▼1	11 (18.3%)	11 / 60
Liberal Party	24,120 (24.6%)	▼0.6	1 (5.0%)	1 / 20	▼3	7 (11.7%)	7 / 60
Heald Green Ratepayers	2,713 (2.8%)	▲0.3	1 (5.0%)	1 / 20	Steady	3 (5.0%)	3 / 60
Residents	1,329 (1.4%)	▼0.1	0 (0.0%)	0 / 20	▼1	0 (0.0%)	0 / 60
Communist	203 (0.2%)	▼0.2	0 (0.0%)	0 / 20	Steady	0 (0.0%)	0 / 60
Independent	86 (0.1%)	Steady	0 (0.0%)	0 / 20	Steady	0 (0.0%)	0 / 60

↓
11	7	3	39

== Ward results ==
=== No.1 (Brinnington & Lancashire Hill) ===
Brinnington & Lancashire Hill
Party	Candidate	Votes	%	±%
Labour	A. Bradbury*	2,552	60.7	+10.3
Conservative	G. Brook	1,343	32.0	−2.8
Liberal	J. D. Hunt	306	7.3	−7.6
Majority		1,209	28.8	+13.2
Turnout		4,201	31.0	+4.1
Labour hold		Swing		

=== No.2 (Manor & Little Moor) ===
Manor & Little Moor
Party	Candidate	Votes	%	±%
Labour	H. Walker	1,468	43.1	+7.3
Conservative	M. Wilson	1,409	41.4	−7.6
Liberal	M. Walmsley	464	13.6	+0.5
Communist	I. Crawford	64	1.9	−0.2
Majority		59	1.7	
Turnout		3,405	39.1	+3.1
Labour hold		Swing		

=== No.3 (Vernon & Offerton) ===
Vernon & Offerton
Party	Candidate	Votes	%	±%
Conservative	W. Malpass	1,561	39.9	−1.1
Labour	W. Meen	1,525	39.0	+3.1
Liberal	R. Dearman*	827	21.1	−2.0
Majority		36	0.9	−4.2
Turnout		3,913	41.1	+6.1
Conservative gain from Liberal		Swing		

=== No.4 (Heaviley & Davenport) ===
Heaviley & Davenport
Party	Candidate	Votes	%	±%
Conservative	H. Dodd*	2,799	62.8	−5.4
Liberal	R. Quayle	921	20.7	+5.4
Labour	P. Towey	739	16.5	0
Majority		1,878	42.1	−9.6
Turnout		4,459	41.4	−0.1
Conservative hold		Swing		

=== No.5 (Adswood & Cale Green) ===
Adswood & Cale Green
Party	Candidate	Votes	%	±%
Labour	K. Brookes*	1,907	44.5	+7.3
Conservative	G. Lowe	1,607	41.6	−4.5
Liberal	E. Fantom	534	13.9	−0.8
Majority		111	2.9	
Turnout		3,859	33.6	+5.4
Labour hold		Swing		

=== No.6 (Edgeley & Cheadle Heath) ===
Edgeley & Cheadle Heath
Party	Candidate	Votes	%	±%
Liberal	F. Childs	2,017	39.3	+18.9
Conservative	H. Bennett	1,510	29.4	−11.3
Labour	R. Heys*	1,482	28.8	−6.5
Independent	J. Hunt	86	1.7	N/A
Communist	V. Ohren	43	0.8	−0.5
Majority		507	9.9	
Turnout		5,138	46.7	+10.3
Liberal gain from Labour		Swing		

=== No.7 (Heaton Mersey & Heaton Norris) ===
Heaton Mersey & Heaton Norris
Party	Candidate	Votes	%	±%
Conservative	E. Foulkes*	3,360	65.2	+2.7
Labour	A. Jones	1,042	20.2	+1.6
Liberal	N. Dobbie	749	14.6	−1.1
Majority		2,317	45.0	+0.9
Turnout		5,152	42.2	−0.2
Conservative hold		Swing		

=== No.8 (Heaton Moor & Heaton Chapel) ===
Heaton Moor & Heaton Chapel
Party	Candidate	Votes	%	±%
Conservative	J. Lloyd*	3,297	63.8	0
Labour	J. Lowe	1,221	23.6	+1.8
Liberal	R. Worthington	648	12.6	−1.8
Majority		2,076	40.2	−1.8
Turnout		5,166	44.0	0
Conservative hold		Swing		

=== No.9 (Reddish Green & Longford) ===
Reddish Green & Longford
Party	Candidate	Votes	%	±%
Labour	C. Foster*	2,495	49.6	+2.5
Conservative	M. Litchfield	1,959	38.9	+1.3
Liberal	L. Duckett	480	9.5	−3.7
Communist	N. Bourne	96	2.0	−0.2
Majority		536	10.7	+1.2
Turnout		5,030	42.0	+8.2
Labour hold		Swing		

=== No.10 (Bredbury Goyt) ===
Bredbury Goyt
Party	Candidate	Votes	%	±%
Conservative	H. Whitehead*	2,840	57.7	+0.8
Liberal	S. Hall	1,358	27.6	−3.1
Labour	W. Prince	720	14.7	+2.3
Majority		1,482	30.1	+3.9
Turnout		4,918	44.0	−0.9
Conservative hold		Swing		

=== No.11 (Bredbury Tame) ===
Bredbury Tame
Party	Candidate	Votes	%	±%
Conservative	K. H. Greenhough*	2,193	45.5	−2.5
Labour	J. Howard	1,467	30.4	+8.4
Liberal	B. Hall	1,165	24.1	−5.9
Majority		726	15.1	−2.9
Turnout		4,825	46.7	+2.9
Conservative hold		Swing		

=== No.12 (Heald Green) ===
Heald Green
Party	Candidate	Votes	%	±%
Heald Green Ratepayers	R. Stenson*	2,713	55.3	+7.6
Conservative	M. Campbell	1,111	22.6	−8.2
Liberal	P. Porgess	723	14.7	−0.6
Labour	D. Lewis	361	7.4	+1.2
Majority		1,602	32.7	+20.6
Turnout		4,908	47.8	−0.1
Heald Green Ratepayers hold		Swing		

=== No.13 (Cheadle & Gatley) ===
Cheadle & Gatley
Party	Candidate	Votes	%	±%
Conservative	F. Bishop*	4,004	62.7	+1.9
Liberal	L. Foulgar	1,639	25.6	−7.4
Labour	A. Endsor	747	11.7	+5.4
Majority		2,365	37.1	+9.3
Turnout		6,390	48.7	−5.1
Conservative hold		Swing		

=== No.14 (Cheadle Hulme South) ===
Cheadle Hulme South
Party	Candidate	Votes	%	±%
Conservative	W. Allen	1,913	41.0	+6.0
Residents	R. Higgins	1,329	28.5	−4.4
Liberal	R. Smith	1,120	24.0	−2.9
Labour	C. Gill	306	6.6	+1.3
Majority		584	12.5	+10.4
Turnout		4,668	56.9	+5.1
Conservative gain from Residents		Swing		

=== No.15 (Cheadle Hulme North & Adswood) ===
Cheadle Hulme North & Adswood
Party	Candidate	Votes	%	±%
Conservative	B. Thompson*	2,974	49.6	+4.9
Liberal	K. Rossall	2,173	35.8	−4.3
Labour	M. Parker	878	14.6	−0.6
Majority		825	13.7	+9.2
Turnout		6,001	51.4	+5.2
Conservative hold		Swing		

=== No.16 (Torkington & Norbury) ===
Torkington & Norbury
Party	Candidate	Votes	%	±%
Conservative	B. Miller	3,678	51.2	−7.7
Liberal	M. Hendley*	2,441	40.0	+7.3
Labour	G. Collier	538	8.8	+0.4
Majority		690	11.2	−15.1
Turnout		6,110	51.6	−1.2
Conservative gain from Liberal		Swing		

=== No.17 (Ladybrook) ===
Ladybrook
Party	Candidate	Votes	%	±%
Conservative	D. Havers	1,991	60.3	−0.2
Liberal	J. Warrington	1,148	34.8	−0.6
Labour	M. Francis	164	4.9	+0.7
Majority		843	25.5	+0.4
Turnout		3,303	59.5	+2.1
Conservative hold		Swing		

=== No.18 (Park & Pownall) ===
Park & Pownall
Party	Candidate	Votes	%	±%
Conservative	A. McGregor	3,911	63.2	+1.4
Liberal	B. Massey	2,018	31.5	−1.7
Labour	F. Ollier	339	5.3	+0.3
Majority		2,030	31.7	+3.1
Turnout		6,405	54.2	−0.1
Conservative gain from Liberal		Swing		

=== No.19 (Marple) ===
Marple
Party	Candidate	Votes	%	±%
Conservative	M. Taylor	2,368	49.6	−3.4
Liberal	J. Brady*	1,964	41.1	+4.1
Labour	K. Parkin	442	9.3	−0.7
Majority		404	8.5	−7.6
Turnout		4,774	52.5	+2.1
Conservative gain from Liberal		Swing		

=== No.20 (Mellor & High Lane) ===
Mellor & High Lane
Party	Candidate	Votes	%	±%
Conservative	C. Mason*	2,831	61.1	−1.8
Liberal	G. Fernyhough	1,425	31.3	+1.7
Labour	R. Barstow	347	7.6	+1.1
Majority		1,355	29.8	−4.5
Turnout		4,552	53.1	+1.8
Conservative hold		Swing		
