= 1978 Stockport Metropolitan Borough Council election =

Local election in Stockport

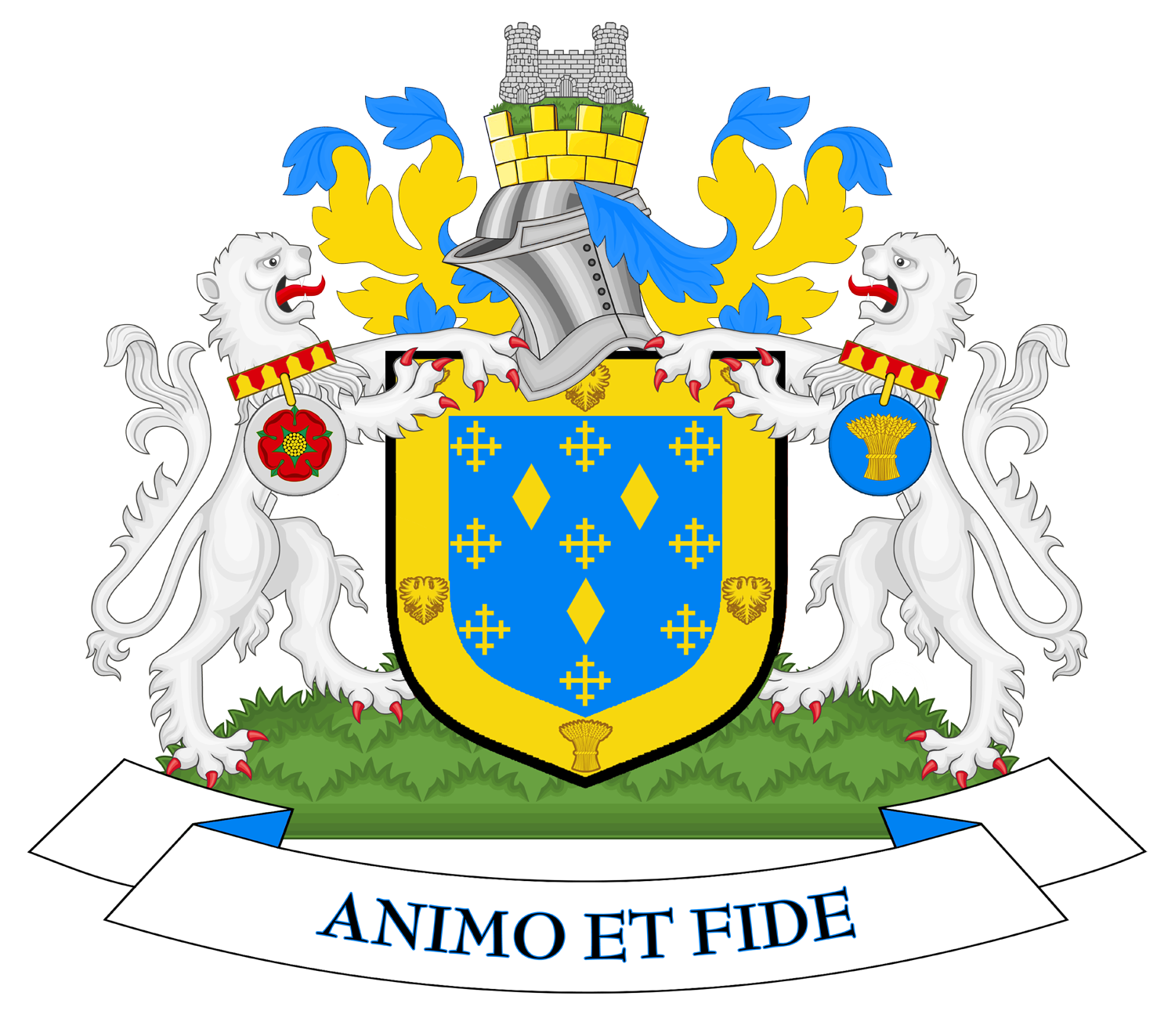
← 1976	4 May 1978	1979 →

20 of 60 seats to Stockport Metropolitan Borough Council 31 seats needed for a majority
	First party	Second party	Third party
Leader	John Howe	Bernard Bradbury	Ken Anstis
Party	Conservative	Labour	Liberal
Leader's seat	Bredbury Goyt	Reddish Green & Longford	Cheadle Hulme North & Adswood
Last election	14 seats, 49.7%	4 seats, 21.2%	1 seats, 24.6%
Seats before	39	12	6
Seats won	11	6	2
Seats after	40	13	4
Seat change	▲1	▲1	▼2
Popular vote	46,675	23,868	20,694
Percentage	49.9%	25.5%	22.1%
Swing	▲0.2%	▲4.3%	▼2.5%
	Fourth party
Leader	Robert Crook
Party	Heald Green Ratepayers
Leader's seat	Heald Green
Last election	1 seat, 2.8%
Seats before	3
Seats won	1
Seats after	3
Seat change	Steady
Popular vote	2,204
Percentage	2.4%
Swing	▼0.4%
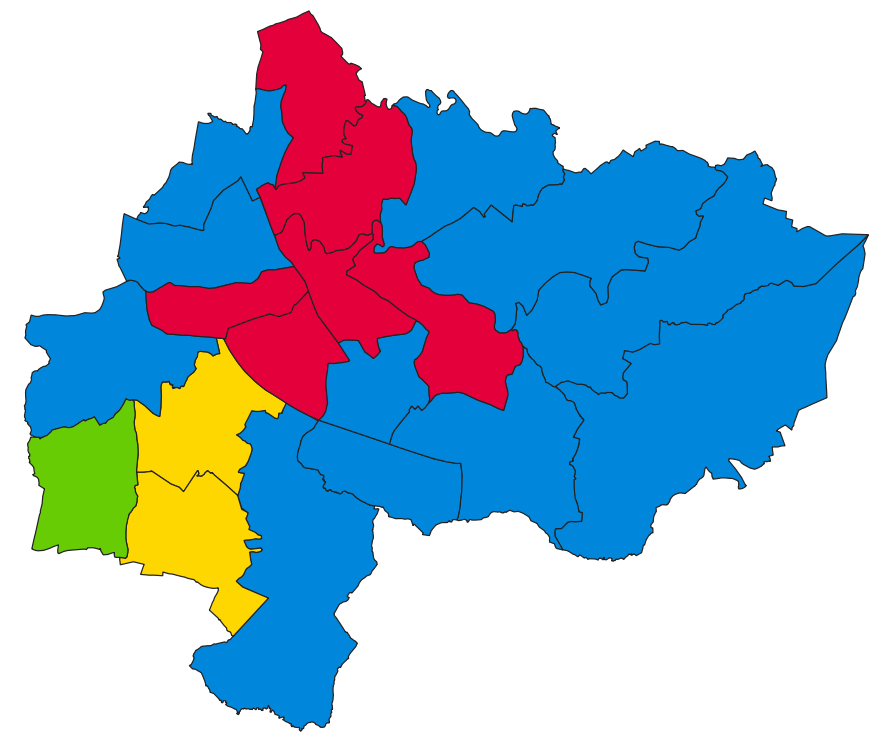
- Map of results of 1978 election
Leader of the Council before election
John Howe
Conservative
Leader of the Council after election
John Howe
Conservative

Elections to Stockport Council were held on Thursday, 4 May 1978. One third of the council was up for election, with each successful candidate to serve a four-year term of office, expiring in 1982. The Conservative Party retained overall control of the council.

== Election result ==
Party	Votes		Seats			Full Council	
Conservative Party	46,675 (49.9%)	▲0.2	11 (55.0%)	11 / 20	▲1	40 (66.7%)	40 / 60
Labour Party	23,868 (25.5%)	▲4.3	6 (30.0%)	6 / 20	▲1	13 (21.7%)	13 / 60
Liberal Party	20,694 (22.1%)	▼2.5	2 (10.0%)	2 / 20	▼2	4 (6.7%)	4 / 60
Heald Green Ratepayers	2,204 (2.4%)	▼0.4	1 (5.0%)	1 / 20	Steady	3 (5.0%)	3 / 60
National Front	124 (0.1%)	N/A	0 (0.0%)	0 / 20	N/A	0 (0.0%)	0 / 60
Communist	64 (0.1%)	▼0.1	0 (0.0%)	0 / 20	Steady	0 (0.0%)	0 / 60

↓
13	4	3	40

== Ward results ==
=== No.1 (Brinnington & Lancashire Hill) ===
Brinnington & Lancashire Hill
Party	Candidate	Votes	%	±%
Labour	K. Ford*	2,956	65.8	+5.1
Conservative	G. Harris	1,304	29.0	−3.0
Liberal	C. Ashworth	230	5.2	−2.1
Majority		1,652	36.8	+8.0
Turnout		4,490	34.0	+3.0
Labour hold		Swing		

=== No.2 (Manor & Little Moor) ===
Manor & Little Moor
Party	Candidate	Votes	%	±%
Labour	E. Gallacher	1,468	48.9	+5.8
Conservative	B. Skitt	1,409	38.5	−2.9
Liberal	R. Quayle	375	12.6	−1.0
Majority		309	10.4	+8.7
Turnout		2,982	35.7	−3.4
Labour hold		Swing		

=== No.3 (Vernon & Offerton) ===
Vernon & Offerton
Party	Candidate	Votes	%	±%
Labour	P. Brogan	1,561	46.4	+7.4
Conservative	E. Williamson*	1,525	44.4	+4.5
Liberal	B. Tuck	336	9.2	−11.9
Majority		74	2.0	
Turnout		3,636	35.0	−6.1
Labour gain from Conservative		Swing		

=== No.4 (Heaviley & Davenport) ===
Heaviley & Davenport
Party	Candidate	Votes	%	±%
Conservative	E. Lowe*	2,738	65.2	+2.4
Labour	C. Gill	1,021	24.3	+7.8
Liberal	E. Fantom	438	10.5	−10.2
Majority		1,717	40.9	−1.2
Turnout		4,197	38.7	−2.7
Conservative hold		Swing		

=== No.5 (Adswood & Cale Green) ===
Adswood & Cale Green
Party	Candidate	Votes	%	±%
Labour	W. Cameron*	2,072	52.0	+7.5
Conservative	E. Howard	1,562	39.2	−2.4
Liberal	J. Rees	223	5.6	−8.3
National Front	K. Walker	124	3.2	N/A
Majority		510	12.8	+9.9
Turnout		3,981	35.1	+1.5
Labour hold		Swing		

=== No.6 (Edgeley & Cheadle Heath) ===
Edgeley & Cheadle Heath
Party	Candidate	Votes	%	±%
Labour	V. Holland*	2,250	45.3	+16.5
Conservative	W. Wilson	1,383	27.9	−1.5
Liberal	S. Howell	1,329	26.8	−12.5
Majority		867	17.4	
Turnout		4,962	45.3	−1.4
Labour hold		Swing		

=== No.7 (Heaton Mersey & Heaton Norris) ===
Heaton Mersey & Heaton Norris
Party	Candidate	Votes	%	±%
Conservative	P. Whitney	3,311	62.7	−2.5
Labour	T. Broome	1,601	30.3	+10.1
Liberal	H. Burrows	368	7.0	−7.6
Majority		1,710	32.4	−12.6
Turnout		5,280	41.3	−0.9
Conservative hold		Swing		

=== No.8 (Heaton Moor & Heaton Chapel) ===
Heaton Moor & Heaton Chapel
Party	Candidate	Votes	%	±%
Conservative	J. A. MacCarron*	2,549	52.0	−11.8
Labour	M. Evans	1,426	29.1	+5.5
Liberal	G. Fenton	930	18.9	+6.3
Majority		1,123	22.9	−17.3
Turnout		4,905	41.7	−2.3
Conservative hold		Swing		

=== No.9 (Reddish Green & Longford) ===
Reddish Green & Longford
Party	Candidate	Votes	%	±%
Labour	A. Verdeille*	3,096	58.6	+9.0
Conservative	D. Lloyd	1,940	36.7	−2.2
Liberal	D. Swindley	185	3.5	−6.0
Communist	N. Bourne	64	1.2	−0.8
Majority		1,156	21.9	+11.2
Turnout		5,285	44.5	+2.5
Labour hold		Swing		

=== No.10 (Bredbury Goyt) ===
Bredbury Goyt
Party	Candidate	Votes	%	±%
Conservative	P. Gilleney	2,720	58.4	+0.7
Liberal	L. Rice	1,009	21.6	−6.0
Labour	W. Prince	932	20.0	+5.4
Majority		1,711	36.8	+6.7
Turnout		4,661	40.7	−3.3
Conservative hold		Swing		

=== No.11 (Bredbury Tame) ===
Bredbury Tame
Party	Candidate	Votes	%	±%
Conservative	B. Norris*	2,193	44.9	−0.6
Labour	P. Scott	1,584	34.8	+4.4
Liberal	D. Humphries	921	20.3	−3.8
Majority		461	10.1	−5.0
Turnout		4,550	43.8	−2.9
Conservative hold		Swing		

=== No.12 (Heald Green) ===
Heald Green
Party	Candidate	Votes	%	±%
Heald Green Ratepayers	R. Crook*	2,204	43.4	−11.9
Conservative	A. Roney	2,117	41.7	+19.1
Labour	M. Lawley	487	9.6	+2.2
Liberal	J. Allan	267	5.3	−9.4
Majority		87	1.7	−31.0
Turnout		5,075	48.6	+0.8
Heald Green Ratepayers hold		Swing		

=== No.13 (Cheadle & Gatley) ===
Cheadle & Gatley
Party	Candidate	Votes	%	±%
Conservative	B. Johnson*	4,048	63.7	+1.0
Liberal	P. Porgess	1,788	28.1	+2.5
Labour	H. Volante	523	8.2	−3.5
Majority		2,260	35.6	−1.5
Turnout		6,359	49.0	+0.3
Conservative hold		Swing		

=== No.14 (Cheadle Hulme South) ===
Cheadle Hulme South
Party	Candidate	Votes	%	±%
Liberal	B. Leah*	2,606	58.0	+34.0
Conservative	T. Radcliffe	1,701	37.9	−3.1
Labour	S. Rimmer	187	4.1	−2.5
Majority		905	20.1	
Turnout		4,494	50.5	−6.4
Liberal hold		Swing		

=== No.15 (Cheadle Hulme North & Adswood) ===
Cheadle Hulme North & Adswood
Party	Candidate	Votes	%	±%
Liberal	K. G. Anstis*	2,586	47.6	+11.8
Conservative	J. Walsh	2,229	41.0	−8.6
Labour	R. Heys	622	11.4	−3.2
Majority		357	6.6	
Turnout		5,437	46.2	−5.2
Liberal hold		Swing		

=== No.16 (Torkington & Norbury) ===
Torkington & Norbury
Party	Candidate	Votes	%	±%
Conservative	A. Law*	3,008	55.0	+3.8
Liberal	K. Lawrence	1,801	32.9	−7.1
Labour	J. Vosper	659	12.1	+3.3
Majority		1,207	22.1	+10.9
Turnout		5,468	45.6	−6.0
Conservative hold		Swing		

=== No.17 (Ladybrook) ===
Ladybrook
Party	Candidate	Votes	%	±%
Conservative	A. Doherty	1,979	62.6	+2.3
Liberal	J. Ashworth*	1,016	32.2	−2.6
Labour	A. Pitt	164	5.2	+0.3
Majority		963	30.4	+4.9
Turnout		3,159	55.0	−4.5
Conservative gain from Liberal		Swing		

=== No.18 (Park & Pownall) ===
Park & Pownall
Party	Candidate	Votes	%	±%
Conservative	J. B. Leck*	3,779	63.9	+0.7
Liberal	R. Tilley	1,729	29.2	−2.3
Labour	G. Lomax	339	6.9	+1.6
Majority		2,050	34.7	+3.0
Turnout		5,912	48.0	−6.2
Conservative hold		Swing		

=== No.19 (Marple) ===
Marple
Party	Candidate	Votes	%	±%
Conservative	S. Clarke	2,488	57.2	+7.6
Liberal	G. Gribble	1,330	30.6	−10.5
Labour	M. Stevens	532	12.2	+2.9
Majority		1,158	26.6	+18.1
Turnout		4,350	46.4	−6.1
Conservative gain from Liberal		Swing		

=== No.20 (Mellor & High Lane) ===
Mellor & High Lane
Party	Candidate	Votes	%	±%
Conservative	H. Cooke*	2,692	64.1	+3.0
Liberal	J. Hart	1,117	26.6	−4.7
Labour	W. Watson	388	9.3	+1.7
Majority		1,575	37.5	+7.7
Turnout		4,197	48.3	−4.8
Conservative hold		Swing		
