= 1975 Stockport Metropolitan Borough Council election =

Local election in Stockport

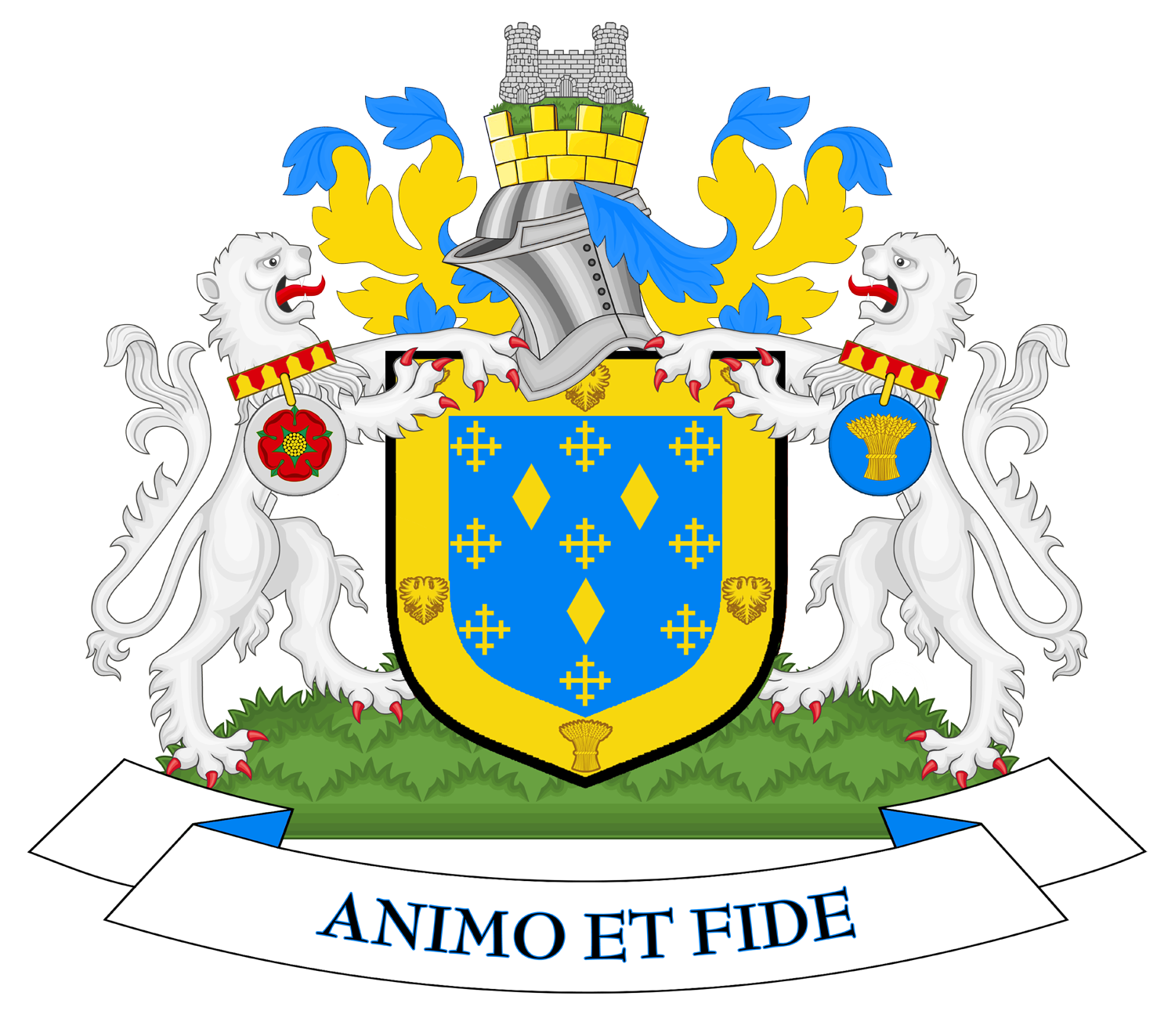
← 1973	1 May 1975	1976 →

20 of 60 seats to Stockport Metropolitan Borough Council 31 seats needed for a majority
	First party	Second party	Third party
Leader	Walter Knight	Brian Slack	Ken Anstis
Party	Conservative	Labour	Liberal
Leader's seat	Heaton Moor & Heaton Chapel	Manor & Little Moor	Cheadle Hulme North & Adswood
Last election	27 seats, 38.8%	16 seats, 22.3%	13 seats, 34.9%
Seats before	27	16	13
Seats won	17	2	0
Seats after	34	12	10
Seat change	▲7	▼4	▼3
Popular vote	48,171	16,668	23,284
Percentage	52.2%	18.0%	25.2%
Swing	▲13.4%	▼4.3%	▼9.7%
	Fourth party	Fifth party
Leader	Robert Crook	Robert Law
Party	Heald Green Ratepayers	Residents
Leader's seat	Heald Green	Cheadle Hulme South
Last election	3 seats, 2.2%	1 seat, 1.5%
Seats before	3	1
Seats won	1	0
Seats after	3	1
Seat change	Steady	Steady
Popular vote	2,326	1,384
Percentage	2.5%	1.5%
Swing	▲0.3%	Steady
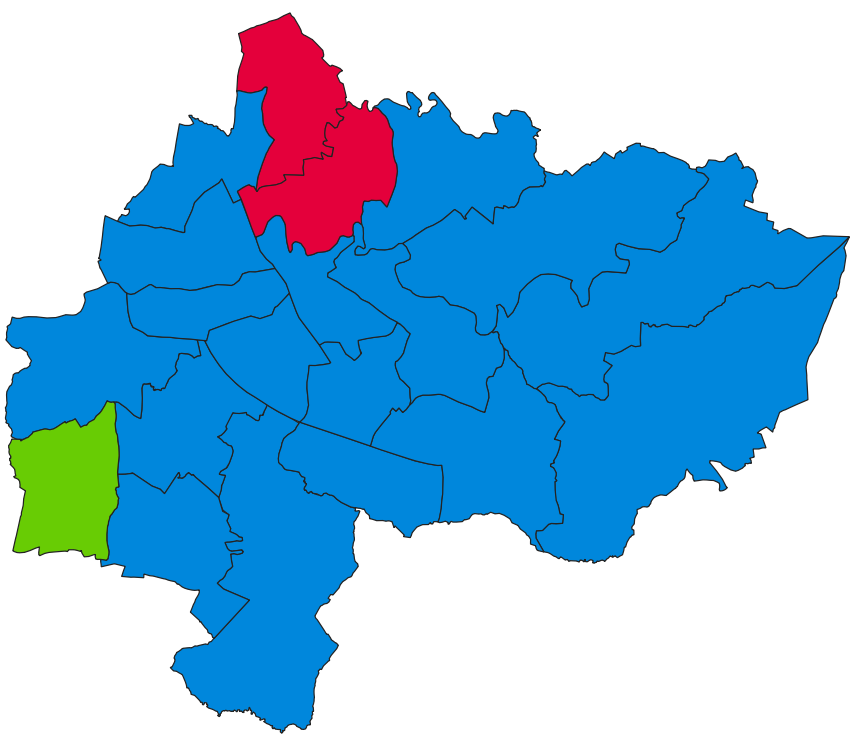
- Map of results of 1975 election
Leader of the Council before election
Walter Knight
Conservative
Leader of the Council after election
Walter Knight
Conservative

Elections to Stockport Council were held on Thursday, 1 May 1975. One third of the council was up for election, with each successful candidate to serve a four-year term of office, expiring in 1979. These were the first Borough elections to be held in Stockport since it received its Royal Charter (and effectively took over from its predecessor Districts and Municipal Boroughs) in 1974. The Conservative Party gained overall control of the council, from no overall control.

== Election result ==
Party	Votes		Seats			Full Council	
Conservative Party	48,171 (52.2%)	▲13.4	17 (85.0%)	17 / 20	▲7	34 (56.7%)	34 / 60
Labour Party	16,668 (18.0%)	▼4.3	2 (10.0%)	2 / 20	▼4	12 (20.0%)	12 / 60
Liberal Party	23,284 (25.2%)	▼9.7	0 (0.0%)	0 / 20	▼3	10 (16.7%)	10 / 60
Heald Green Ratepayers	2,326 (2.5%)	▲0.3	1 (5.0%)	1 / 20	Steady	3 (5.0%)	3 / 60
Residents	1,384 (1.5%)	Steady	0 (0.0%)	0 / 20	Steady	1 (1.7%)	1 / 60
Communist	344 (0.4%)	▲0.1	0 (0.0%)	0 / 20	Steady	0 (0.0%)	0 / 60
National Front	92 (0.1%)	N/A	0 (0.0%)	0 / 20	N/A	0 (0.0%)	0 / 60
Independent	80 (0.1%)	N/A	0 (0.0%)	0 / 20	N/A	0 (0.0%)	0 / 60

↓
12	10	1	3	34

== Ward results ==
=== No.1 (Brinnington & Lancashire Hill) ===
Brinnington & Lancashire Hill
Party	Candidate	Votes	%	±%
Labour	D. T. Greene*	1,845	50.4	−10.0
Conservative	G. Brook	1,273	34.8	+13.5
Liberal	J. D. Hunt	545	14.9	−9.9
Majority		572	15.6	−14.2
Turnout		3,663	26.9	+1.0
Labour hold		Swing		

=== No.2 (Manor & Little Moor) ===
Manor & Little Moor
Party	Candidate	Votes	%	±%
Conservative	A. Chapman	1,569	49.0	+13.2
Labour	M. Wilson	1,147	35.8	−6.2
Liberal	G. F. Fletcher	418	13.1	−14.7
Communist	K. Marston	67	2.1	N/A
Majority		422	13.2	
Turnout		3,201	36.0	+2.4
Conservative gain from Labour		Swing		

=== No.3 (Vernon & Offerton) ===
Vernon & Offerton
Party	Candidate	Votes	%	±%
Conservative	R. Murphy	1,341	41.0	+11.7
Labour	M. Mendelson*	1,174	35.9	+0.3
Liberal	J. S. Hosking	752	23.1	−16.7
Majority		167	5.1	
Turnout		3,267	35.0	+0.7
Conservative gain from Labour		Swing		

=== No.4 (Heaviley & Davenport) ===
Heaviley & Davenport
Party	Candidate	Votes	%	±%
Conservative	B. Haley	2,987	68.2	+17.5
Labour	B. Barstow	724	16.5	−2.3
Liberal	D. Dearman	668	15.3	−20.8
Majority		2,263	51.7	+39.3
Turnout		4,379	41.5	+2.2
Conservative hold		Swing		

=== No.5 (Adswood & Cale Green) ===
Adswood & Cale Green
Party	Candidate	Votes	%	±%
Conservative	I. Roberts	1,907	46.1	+15.4
Labour	H. Walker*	1,216	37.2	−11.0
Liberal	E. Fantom	490	14.7	−9.4
Communist	I. Crawford	70	2.1	N/A
Majority		297	8.9	
Turnout		3,343	28.2	−5.1
Conservative gain from Labour		Swing		

=== No.6 (Edgeley & Cheadle Heath) ===
Edgeley & Cheadle Heath
Party	Candidate	Votes	%	±%
Conservative	J. Redfern	1,666	40.7	+2.5
Labour	F. Ollier*	1,445	35.3	−16.3
Liberal	F. Childs	836	20.4	+8.5
National Front	M. Pegg	92	2.2	N/A
Communist	V. Ohren	54	1.3	−1.3
Majority		221	5.4	
Turnout		4,093	36.4	+4.9
Conservative gain from Labour		Swing		

=== No.7 (Heaton Mersey & Heaton Norris) ===
Heaton Mersey & Heaton Norris
Party	Candidate	Votes	%	±%
Conservative	V. Burgon*	3,172	62.8	+14.6
Labour	A. Beck	942	18.6	−4.1
Liberal	P. Rowe	794	15.7	−21.5
Independent	T. Denton	80	1.6	N/A
Communist	B. Ainley	64	1.3	−1.5
Majority		2,230	44.1	+33.5
Turnout		5,052	42.2	+0.8
Conservative hold		Swing		

=== No.8 (Heaton Moor & Heaton Chapel) ===
Heaton Moor & Heaton Chapel
Party	Candidate	Votes	%	±%
Conservative	W. C. Knight*	3,299	63.8	+10.9
Labour	D. Rigby	1,129	21.8	−8.6
Liberal	R. Worthington	742	14.4	−4.3
Majority		2,170	42.0	+20.3
Turnout		5,170	44.0	+3.4
Conservative hold		Swing		

=== No.9 (Reddish Green & Longford) ===
Reddish Green & Longford
Party	Candidate	Votes	%	±%
Labour	B. Bradbury*	1,936	47.1	−9.0
Conservative	A. Jones	1,547	37.6	+9.8
Liberal	P. Sharp	542	13.2	−5.5
Communist	N. Bourne	89	2.2	−1.0
Majority		389	9.5	−16.8
Turnout		4,114	33.8	+2.1
Labour hold		Swing		

=== No.10 (Bredbury Goyt) ===
Bredbury Goyt
Party	Candidate	Votes	%	±%
Conservative	J. G. Howe*	2,837	56.9	+13.1
Liberal	S. Hall	1,529	30.7	−7.2
Labour	M. Brierley	617	12.4	−8.1
Majority		1,308	26.2	+21.2
Turnout		4,983	44.9	
Conservative hold		Swing		

=== No.11 (Bredbury Tame) ===
Bredbury Tame
Party	Candidate	Votes	%	±%
Conservative	K. H. Greenhough*	2,171	48.0	+9.8
Liberal	S. Humphries	1,354	30.0	−4.3
Labour	H. Brown	996	22.0	−8.9
Majority		817	18.0	+15.6
Turnout		4,521	43.8	−0.2
Conservative hold		Swing		

=== No.12 (Heald Green) ===
Heald Green
Party	Candidate	Votes	%	±%
Heald Green Ratepayers	N. Fields*	2,326	47.7	+1.3
Conservative	C. Bowes	1,501	30.8	+11.7
Liberal	P. Porgess	745	15.3	−13.6
Labour	D. Lewis	301	6.2	−4.3
Majority		825	12.1	0
Turnout		4,873	47.9	+4.9
Heald Green Ratepayers hold		Swing		

=== No.13 (Cheadle & Gatley) ===
Cheadle & Gatley
Party	Candidate	Votes	%	±%
Conservative	L. I. Singer*	4,276	60.8	+9.6
Liberal	P. Parker	2,320	33.0	−12.3
Labour	C. Campbell	441	6.3	−2.1
Majority		1,956	27.8	+26.7
Turnout		7,037	53.8	+6.9
Conservative hold		Swing		

=== No.14 (Cheadle Hulme South) ===
Cheadle Hulme South
Party	Candidate	Votes	%	±%
Conservative	V. J. James	1,472	35.0	+8.7
Residents	N. Burnell	1,384	32.9	−2.4
Liberal	B. Rees	1,131	26.9	−9.1
Labour	M. Parker	224	5.3	−0.3
Majority		88	2.1	
Turnout		4,211	51.8	+5.6
Conservative gain from Liberal		Swing		

=== No.15 (Cheadle Hulme North & Adswood) ===
Cheadle Hulme North & Adswood
Party	Candidate	Votes	%	±%
Conservative	A. Grisenthwaite*	2,419	44.7	+2.1
Liberal	K. Rossall	2,173	40.1	−5.8
Labour	N. Stoddard	821	15.2	−1.7
Majority		246	4.5	+4.3
Turnout		5,413	46.2	+2.7
Conservative hold		Swing		

=== No.16 (Torkington & Norbury) ===
Torkington & Norbury
Party	Candidate	Votes	%	±%
Conservative	J. Kane	3,678	58.9	+22.8
Liberal	H. Burrows*	2,039	32.7	−25.5
Labour	G. Collier	526	8.4	−1.3
Majority		1,639	26.3	
Turnout		6,243	52.8	+8.8
Conservative gain from Liberal		Swing		

=== No.17 (Ladybrook) ===
Ladybrook
Party	Candidate	Votes	%	±%
Conservative	F. Gibson	1,920	60.5	+11.3
Liberal	J. Warrington	1,124	35.4	−16.1
Labour	B. Hughes	132	4.2	0
Majority		796	25.1	+24.5
Turnout		3,176	57.4	+4.5
Conservative hold		Swing		

=== No.18 (Park & Pownall) ===
Park & Pownall
Party	Candidate	Votes	%	±%
Conservative	R. L. Peuleve	3,911	61.8	+11.5
Liberal	P. Gooding	2,101	33.2	−15.6
Labour	A. Endsor	315	5.0	+1.8
Majority		1,810	28.6	+28.2
Turnout		6,327	54.3	+3.7
Conservative hold		Swing		

=== No.19 (Marple) ===
Marple
Party	Candidate	Votes	%	±%
Conservative	D. J. Headridge	2,394	53.0	+11.3
Liberal	G. Gribble*	1,669	37.0	−11.9
Labour	W. Lloyd	451	10.0	−7.4
Majority		725	16.1	+13.0
Turnout		4,514	50.4	−1.1
Conservative gain from Liberal		Swing		

=== No.20 (Mellor & High Lane) ===
Mellor & High Lane
Party	Candidate	Votes	%	±%
Conservative	A. W. Finnie*	2,831	63.9	+16.5
Liberal	G. Fernyhough	1,312	29.6	−16.4
Labour	J. Cosgrove	286	6.5	−2.0
Majority		1,519	34.3	+33.8
Turnout		4,429	51.3	+2.3
Conservative hold		Swing		
