= 2011 Stockport Metropolitan Borough Council election =

2011 UK local government election

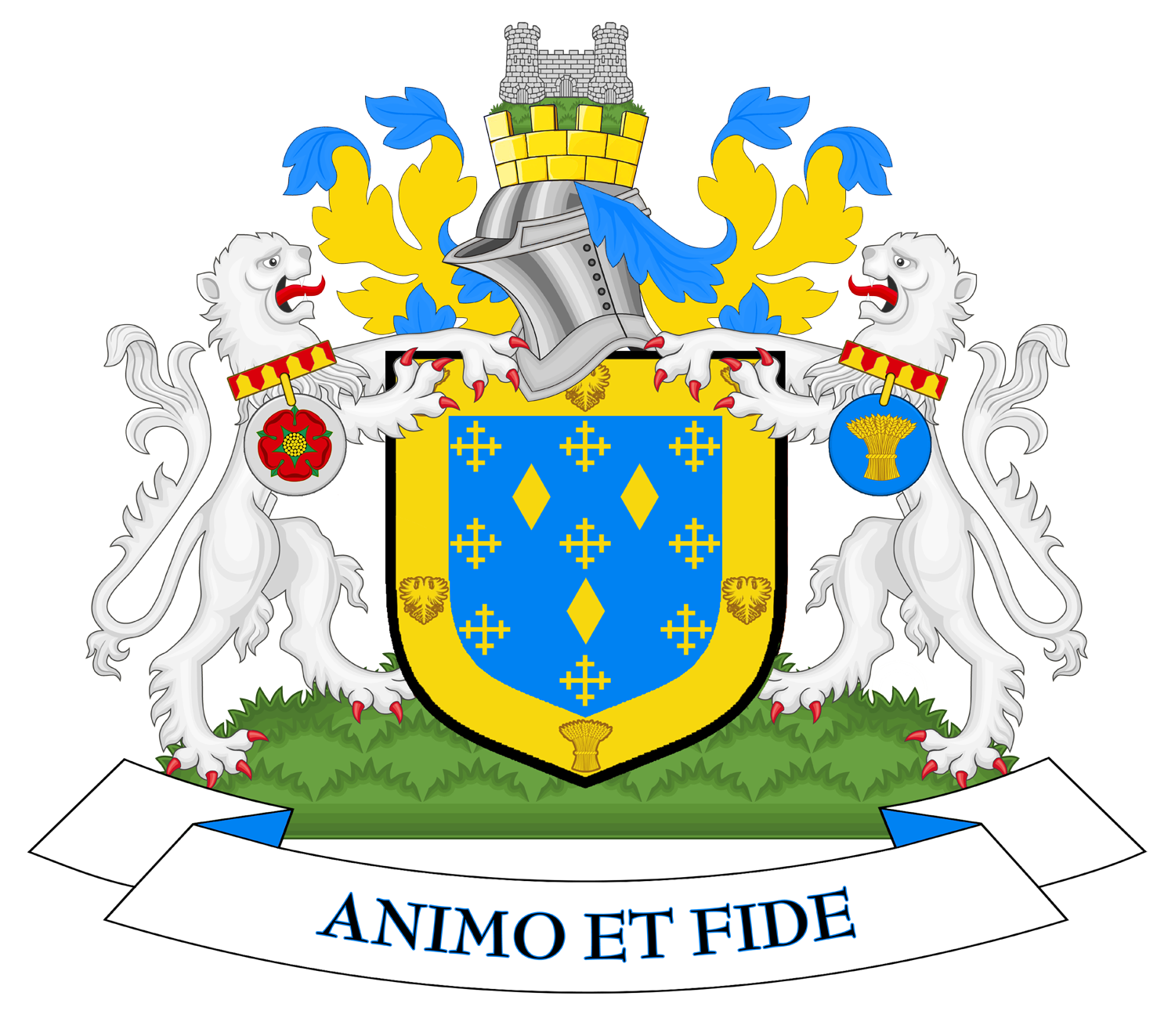
- 5 May 2011

21 Seats up for Election
	First party	Second party
Leader	Dave Goddard	Andrew Verdeille
Party	Liberal Democrats	Labour
Leader's seat	Offerton	Reddish South
Seats before	37	13
Seats won	8	9
Seats after	31	16
Seat change	▼6	▲3
	Third party	Fourth party
Leader	Syd Lloyd	Peter Burns
Party	Conservative	Heald Green Ratepayers
Leader's seat	Bredbury Green & Romiley	Heald Green
Seats before	8	3
Seats won	4	1
Seats after	11	3
Seat change	▲3	Steady
- Map showing the results of the 2011 Stockport Metropolitan Borough Council elections by ward. Red shows Labour seats, blue shows the Conservatives, yellow shows the Liberal Democrats and green the Heald Green Ratepayers.

Elections to Stockport Metropolitan Borough Council were held on 5 May 2011, with one third of the seats up for election.

Following the elections, the Liberal Democrats lost their majority on the council for the first time since 2002, but continued in power without an overall majority.

The state of the parties after the election was:

Party	Seats	±	% votes
Liberal Democrat	31	-6	
Labour	16	+3	
Conservative	11	+3	
Heald Green Ratepayer	3	0	
Independent left	2	0	

== Ward results ==
=== Bramhall North ===
Bramhall North
Party	Candidate	Votes	%	±%
Conservative	Alanna Vine	2,799	49.2	+1.4
Liberal Democrats	Helen Foster-Grime	2,261	39.8	−8.0
Labour	Brian Harrop	596	10.5	+4.0
Majority		538		
Turnout		5,687	53.18	
Conservative gain from Liberal Democrats		Swing		

=== Bramhall South ===
Bramhall South
Party	Candidate	Votes	%	±%
Conservative	Paul Bellis*	2,791	54.2	
Liberal Democrats	Paul Carter	1,489	28.9	
Labour	Beryl Dykes	480	9.3	
UKIP	David Perry	213	4.1	
Green	Ross White	176	3.4	
Majority		1,302		
Turnout		5,149	51.94	
Conservative hold		Swing		

=== Bredbury and Woodley ===
Bredbury and Woodley
Party	Candidate	Votes	%	±%
Liberal Democrats	Michael Wilson	1,912	48.9	−10.0
Labour	Philip Bray	1,153	29.5	+14.5
Conservative	Rosalind Lloyd	844	21.6	−3.7
Majority		759		
Turnout		3,909	36.00	
Liberal Democrats hold		Swing		

=== Bredbury Green and Romiley ===
Bredbury Green and Romiley
Party	Candidate	Votes	%	±%
Conservative	Syd Lloyd	2,238	46.7	
Liberal Democrats	Margaret McLay	1,580	33.0	
Labour	David Sedgwick	970	20.3	
Majority		658		
Turnout		4,788	43.68	
Conservative gain from Liberal Democrats		Swing		

=== Brinnington and Central ===
Brinnington and Central
Party	Candidate	Votes	%	±%
Labour	Chris Murphy	1,992	69.8	+20.6
Liberal Democrats	Bruce Fairbanks	336	11.8	−16
Conservative	Steve Holgate	305	10.7	+0.6
Green	Chris Green	219	7.7	+5.2
Majority		1,656		
Turnout		2,852	28.26	
Labour hold		Swing		

=== Cheadle and Gatley ===
Cheadle and Gatley
Party	Candidate	Votes	%	±%
Liberal Democrats	Pam King	2,153	40.0	−13.0
Conservative	Julie Smith-Jones	2,063	38.3	+2.0
Labour	Colin Owen	1,143	21.2	+10.8
Majority		90		
Turnout		5,383	46.53	
Liberal Democrats hold		Swing		

=== Cheadle Hulme North ===
Cheadle Hulme North
Party	Candidate	Votes	%	±%
Liberal Democrats	Paul Porgess	1,753	41.6	
Labour	Matthew Baker	1,188	28.2	
Conservative	Robert Stevenson	984	23.4	
UKIP	Hilda Peake	268	6.4	
Majority		565		
Turnout		4,213	41.46	
Liberal Democrats hold		Swing		

=== Cheadle Hulme South ===
Cheadle Hulme South
Party	Candidate	Votes	%	±%
Liberal Democrats	Suzanne Wyatt	2,069	42.4	−11.8
Conservative	Brian Dougal	1,729	35.4	−1.5
Labour	Theo Smith	767	15.7	+7.3
UKIP	Cyril Peake	283	5.8	+5.8
Majority		340		
Turnout		4,881	45.85	
Liberal Democrats hold		Swing		

=== Davenport and Cale Green ===
Davenport and Cale Green
Party	Candidate	Votes	%	±%
Labour	Brian Hendley	2,083	54.0	
Liberal Democrats	John Reid	819	21.2	
Conservative	Bryan Lees	607	15.7	
Green	Phil Shaw	320	8.3	
Majority		1,264		
Turnout		3,858	35.26	
Labour gain from Liberal Democrats		Swing		

=== Edgeley and Cheadle Heath ===
Edgeley and Cheadle Heath
Party	Candidate	Votes	%	±%
Labour	Richard Coaton	2,428	66.4	
Conservative	Chris Holgate	547	14.9	
Liberal Democrats	Danny Langley	406	11.1	
Green	Andrew Knighton	256	7.0	
Majority		1,881		
Turnout		3,659	34.36	
Labour hold		Swing		

=== Hazel Grove ===
Hazel Grove
Party	Candidate	Votes	%	±%
Conservative	William Wragg	1,918	38.8	+2.4
Liberal Democrats	Christine Corris	1,789	36.1	−14.9
Labour	Karen Vickers	892	18.0	+6.2
UKIP	Mark Shanahan	331	6.7	
Majority		129		
Turnout		4,949	44.73	
Conservative gain from Liberal Democrats		Swing		

=== Heald Green ===
Heald Green
Party	Candidate	Votes	%	±%
Heald Green Ratepayers	Eileen Sylvia Humphreys	2,690	65.7	
Labour	Kathryn Priestley	526	12.8	
Conservative	Pat Leck	389	9.5	
Liberal Democrats	Eric Brindley	322	7.9	
BNP	Richard Skill	170	4.1	
Majority		2,164		
Turnout		4,120	41.29	
Heald Green Ratepayers hold		Swing		

=== Heatons North ===
Heatons North
Party	Candidate	Votes	%	±%
Labour	Alex Ganotis	2,120	45.1	
Conservative	Jackie Jones	1,758	37.4	
Liberal Democrats	Andrew Rawling	396	8.4	
Green	Peter Barber	392	8.3	
Majority		362		
Turnout		4,704	44.55	
Labour gain from Conservative		Swing		

=== Heatons South ===
Heatons South
Party	Candidate	Votes	%	±%
Labour	Dean Fitzpatrick	2,568	52.8	
Conservative	Barbara Judson	1,507	31.0	
Liberal Democrats	Ron Axtell	442	9.1	
Green	Conrad Beard	324	6.7	
Majority		1,061		
Turnout		4,866	44.51	
Labour hold		Swing		

=== Manor ===
Patrick McAuley left Labour and became a Lib Dem councillor in 2012.

Manor
Party	Candidate	Votes	%	±%
Labour	Patrick McAuley	1,603	44.0	
Liberal Democrats	Jenny Humphreys	1,314	36.0	
Conservative	Leslie Judson	526	14.4	
BNP	Duncan Warner	204	5.6	
Majority		289		
Turnout		3,665	34.66	
Labour gain from Liberal Democrats		Swing		

=== Marple North ===
Marple North
Party	Candidate	Votes	%	±%
Liberal Democrats	Andrew Bispham	2,061	40.0	
Conservative	Annette Finnie	1,680	32.6	
Labour	David Rowbottom	760	14.8	
Green	Maggie Preston	381	7.4	
UKIP	Ray Jones	253	4.5	
Majority		381		
Turnout		5,151	51.68	
Liberal Democrats hold		Swing		

=== Marple South ===
Marple South
Party	Candidate	Votes	%	±%
Liberal Democrats	Kevin Dowling	1,948	42.0	
Conservative	Andrew Lord	1,493	32.2	
Labour	Clifford Stanway	783	16.7	
UKIP	Tony Moore	380	8.2	
Majority		455		
Turnout		4,638	47.78	
Liberal Democrats hold		Swing		

=== Offerton ===
Offerton
Party	Candidate	Votes	%	±%
Liberal Democrats	Wendy Meikle	1,404	36.8	
Labour	Laura Booth	1,203	31.6	
Conservative	Julie Dawn Wragg	804	21.1	
UKIP	Harry Perry	386	10.1	
Majority		201		
Turnout		3,811	36.32	
Liberal Democrats hold		Swing		

=== Reddish North ===
Reddish North (2)
Party	Candidate	Votes	%	±%
Labour	Paul Moss	2,421		
Labour	David Wilson	2,304		
Conservative	Anthony Hannay	645		
Conservative	Julie Whelan	569		
BNP	Paul Bennett	291		
Liberal Democrats	Pat Buttle	231		
Liberal Democrats	Robert Littlehales	183		
Majority		117		
Turnout		3,604	33.61	
Labour hold		Swing		
Labour hold		Swing		

=== Reddish South ===
Reddish South
Party	Candidate	Votes	%	±%
Labour	Walter Brett	2,347	65.0	
Conservative	Stephen Burt	640	17.7	
Liberal Democrats	Norman Beverley	421	11.7	
BNP	Shelia Spink	177	4.9	
Majority		1,707		
Turnout		3,608	34.40	
Labour hold		Swing		

=== Stepping Hill ===
Stepping Hill
Party	Candidate	Votes	%	±%
Liberal Democrats	Ben Alexander	1,786	39.2	
Conservative	John Wright	1,406	30.9	
Labour	Janet Rothwell	935	20.5	
Green	Ken Pease	155	3.4	
UKIP	Izzy Bolton	150	3.3	
BNP	Alan Carney	96	2.1	
Majority		380		
Turnout		4,552	46.33	
Liberal Democrats hold		Swing		

== Changes 2011–2012 ==
On 21 January 2012, Patrick McAuley, Labour councillor for Manor since May 2011, announced on Twitter that he had resigned from the Labour Party but that he would continue to serve as a councillor;

Preceded by 2010 Stockport Metropolitan Borough Council election	Stockport Metropolitan Borough Council elections	Succeeded by 2012 Stockport Metropolitan Borough Council election
