= Brinnington and Central =

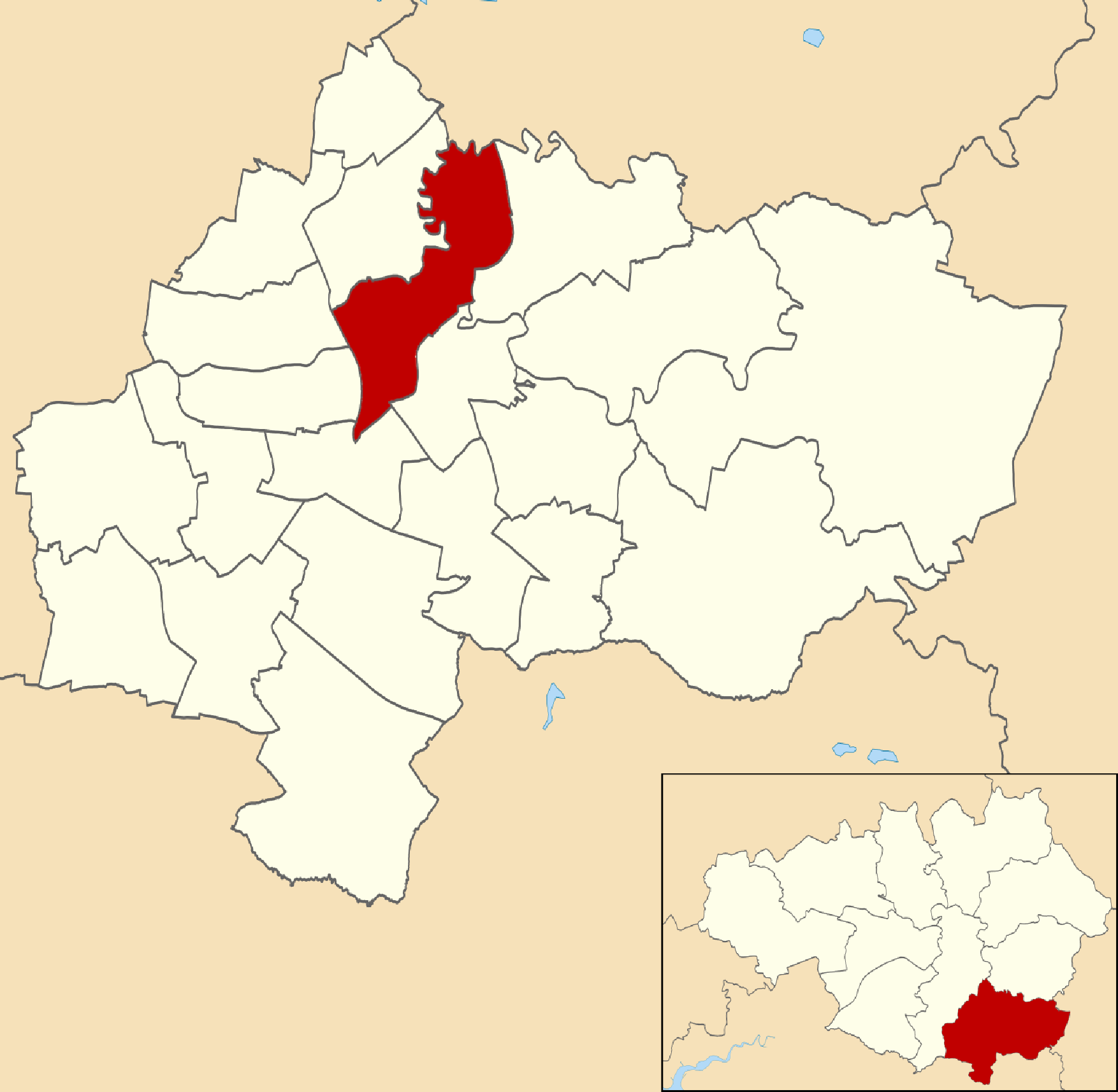
- Brinnington and Central within Stockport
- Population: 9,984 (2010)
- Country: England
- Sovereign state: United Kingdom
- UK Parliament: Stockport
- Councillors: Amanda Peers (Labour Co-op); Kerry Waters (Labour); Andy Sorton (Labour)

Brinnington and Central is an electoral ward in the Metropolitan Borough of Stockport. It elects three Councillors to Stockport Metropolitan Borough Council using the first past the post electoral method, electing one Councillor every year without election on the fourth.

Together with Davenport and Cale Green, Edgeley and Cheadle Heath, Heatons North, Heatons South and Manor, the ward lies in the Stockport Parliamentary Constituency. The ward had previously been in the Denton & Reddish constituency from 1983 to 1997, when boundary changes brought it back to Stockport. The ward contains Stockport town centre and major attractions including the Hatworks and Air Raid Shelters. Brinnington & Central is one of three Priority 1 centres for deprivation.

== Councillors ==
The ward is represented on Stockport Council by three councillors:

- Amanda Peers (Lab)
- Kerry Waters (Lab)
- Andy Sorton (Lab)

Election	Councillor	Councillor	Councillor
2004	Colin MacAlister (Lab)	Chris Murphy (Lab)	Maureen Rowles (Lab)
2006	Colin MacAlister (Lab)	Chris Murphy (Lab)	Maureen Rowles (Lab)
2007	Colin MacAlister (Lab)	Chris Murphy (Lab)	Maureen Rowles (Lab)
2008	Colin MacAlister (Lab)	Chris Murphy (Lab)	Chris Walker (Lib Dem)
February 2010	Colin MacAlister (Lib Dem)	Chris Murphy (Lab)	Chris Walker (Lib Dem)
April 2010	Colin MacAlister (Lib Dem)	Chris Murphy (Lab)	Chris Walker (Ind)
May 2010	Maureen Rowles (Lab)	Chris Murphy (Lab)	Chris Walker (Ind)
November 2010	Maureen Rowles (Lab)	Chris Murphy (Lab)	Chris Walker (Lib Dem)
May 2011	Maureen Rowles (Lab)	Chris Murphy (Lab)	Chris Walker (Lib Dem)
June 2011	Maureen Rowles (Lab)	Chris Murphy (Lab)	Chris Walker (Ind)
2012	Maureen Rowles (Lab)	Chris Murphy (Lab)	Andy Sorton (Lab)
2014	Maureen Rowles (Lab)	Chris Murphy (Lab)	Andy Sorton (Lab)
2015	Maureen Rowles (Lab)	Chris Murphy (Lab)	Andy Sorton (Lab)
2016	Maureen Rowles (Lab)	Chris Murphy (Lab)	Andy Sorton (Lab)
By-election; 8 June 2017	Becky Crawford (Lab)	Chris Murphy (Lab)	Andy Sorton (Lab)
2018	Becky Crawford (Lab)	Chris Murphy (Lab)	Andy Sorton (Lab)
2019	Becky Crawford (Lab)	Kerry Waters (Lab)	Andy Sorton (Lab)
2021	Becky Crawford (Lab)	Chris Murphy (Lab)	Andy Sorton (Lab)
2022	Amanda Peers (Lab Co-op)	Chris Murphy (Lab)	Andy Sorton (Lab)

indicates seat up for re-election. indicates seat won in by-election. indicates councillor suspended / defected.

== Elections in 2010s ==
=== May 2019 ===
2019
Party	Candidate	Votes	%	±%
Labour	Kerry Waters	1,248	60	
Green	Karl Peter Marx Wardlaw	272	13	
Conservative	Ros Lloyd	215	10	
Liberal Democrats	Geoff Abell	183	9	
End Austerity	John Chapman Pearson	164	8	
Majority		976		
Turnout		2,082	20	
Labour hold		Swing		

=== May 2018 ===
2018
Party	Candidate	Votes	%	±%
Labour	Becky Crawford	1,745	78	
Conservative	Ros Lloyd	337	15	
Liberal Democrats	Alex Orndal	161	7	
Majority		1,408		
Turnout		2,243	21	
Labour hold		Swing		

=== By-election 8 June 2017 ===
By-election 8 June 2017
Party	Candidate	Votes	%	±%
Labour	Becky Crawford	3,877	75	
Conservative	Rosalind Lloyd	875	17	
Liberal Democrats	Alex Orndal	193	4	
Green	James Pelham	170	3	
End Austerity	John Pearson	56	1	
Majority		3,002		
Turnout		5,171		
Labour hold		Swing		

=== May 2016 ===
2016
Party	Candidate	Votes	%	±%
Labour	Andy Sorton	1,889	77	
Green	James Pelham	288	12	
Conservative	Ros Lloyd	272	11	
Majority		1,601	25	
Turnout		2,449	25	
Labour hold		Swing		

=== May 2015 ===
2015
Party	Candidate	Votes	%	±%
Labour	Chris Murphy	2,860	57	
UKIP	John Wild	991	20	
Conservative	Rosalind Lloyd	520	10	
Liberal Democrats	Colin Gell	308	6	
Green	Christopher Green	244	5	
Left Unity	Ali Treacher	48	1	
Independent	John Heginbotham	35	1	
Majority		1,869		
Turnout		5,006		
Labour hold		Swing		

=== May 2014 ===
2014
Party	Candidate	Votes	%	±%
Labour	Maureen Rowles	1,540	57	−13.4
UKIP	Michael Buxton	633	23	+11.20
Liberal Democrats	Colin Gell	190	7	−1.23
Conservative	Pat Leck	181	7	+0.37
BNP	Brenda Waterhouse	93	3	N/A
Independent	John Heginbotham	68	3	+0.06%
Majority		907	34	−24.61
Turnout		2705		
Labour hold		Swing		

=== May 2012 ===
2012
Party	Candidate	Votes	%	±%
Labour	Andy Sorton	1,677	70.40	+32.95
UKIP	Phil Lewis	281	11.80	N/A
Liberal Democrats	John Reid	196	8.23	−38.69
Conservative	Stephen Holgate	158	6.63	−2.98
Independent	John Heginbotham	70	2.94	N/A
Majority		1,396	58.61	
Turnout		2,387	23.30	
Labour gain from Liberal Democrats		Swing		

=== May 2011 ===
2011
Party	Candidate	Votes	%	±%
Labour	Chris Murphy	1,992	69.8	+20.6
Liberal Democrats	Bruce Fairbanks	336	11.8	−16
Conservative	Steve Holgate	305	10.7	+0.6
Green	Chris Green	219	7.7	+5.2
Majority		1,656		
Turnout		2,852	28.26	
Labour hold		Swing		
