= Cheadle Hulme North =

Electoral ward in Greater Manchester, England

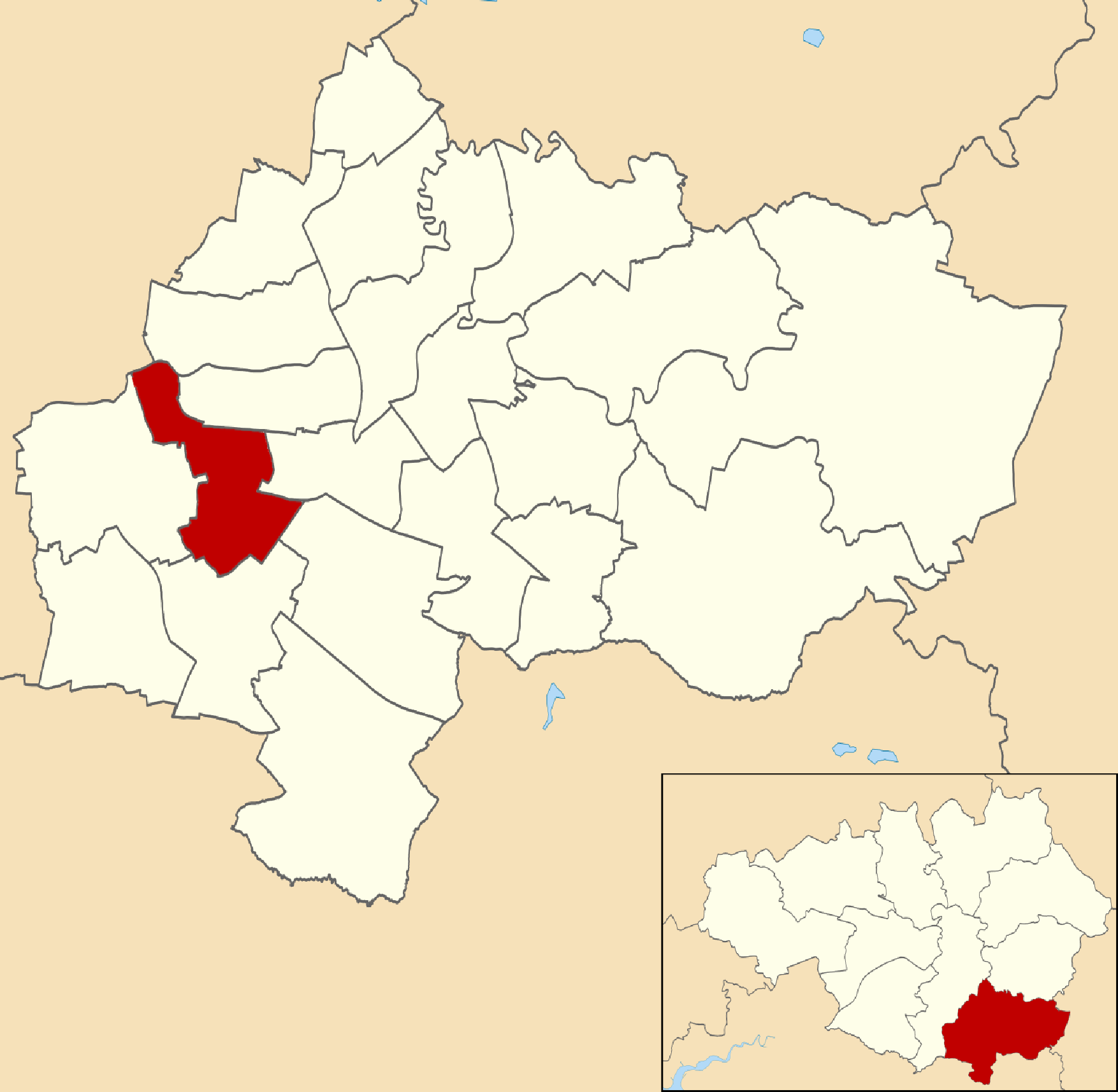
- Cheadle Hulme North within Stockport
- Population: 10,125 (2010)
- Country: England
- Sovereign state: United Kingdom
- UK Parliament: Cheadle
- Councillors: David Meller (Labour Co-op); Tom Morrison (Liberal Democrat); Jilly Julian (Liberal Democrat)

Cheadle Hulme North is an electoral ward in the Metropolitan Borough of Stockport. It elects three Councillors to Stockport Metropolitan Borough Council using the first past the post electoral method, electing one Councillor every year without election on the fourth. There were no local elections in 2020 due to the COVID-19 pandemic, so the fourth year of no elections (due in 2021) was effectively swapped with the third year (2020).

The ward is represented in Westminster by Mary Robinson MP for Cheadle.

The M60 Manchester Ring Road crosses the northern part of the ward.

== Councillors ==
The ward is represented on Stockport Council by three councillors: David Meller (Labour), Tom Morrison (Lib Dem), and Jilly Julian (Lib Dem).

Election	Councillor	Councillor	Councillor
2004	June Somekh (Lib Dem)	Paul Porgess (Lib Dem)	John Pantall (Lib Dem)
2006	June Somekh (Lib Dem)	Paul Porgess (Lib Dem)	John Pantall (Lib Dem)
2007	June Somekh (Lib Dem)	Paul Porgess (Lib Dem)	John Pantall (Lib Dem)
2008	June Somekh (Lib Dem)	Paul Porgess (Lib Dem)	John Pantall (Lib Dem)
2010	June Somekh (Lib Dem)	Paul Porgess (Lib Dem)	John Pantall (Lib Dem)
2011	June Somekh (Lib Dem)	Paul Porgess (Lib Dem)	John Pantall (Lib Dem)
2012	June Somekh (Lib Dem)	Paul Porgess (Lib Dem)	John Pantall (Lib Dem)
2014	June Somekh (Lib Dem)	Paul Porgess (Lib Dem)	John Pantall (Lib Dem)
2015	June Somekh (Lib Dem)	Paul Porgess (Lib Dem)	John Pantall (Lib Dem)
2016	June Somekh (Lib Dem)	Paul Porgess (Lib Dem)	John Pantall (Lib Dem)
2018	David Meller (Lab Co-op)	Paul Porgess (Lib Dem)	John Pantall (Lib Dem)
2019	David Meller (Lab Co-op)	Tom Morrison (Lib Dem)	John Pantall (Lib Dem)
2021	David Meller (Lab Co-op)	Tom Morrison (Lib Dem)	Jilly Julian (Lib Dem)
2022	David Meller (Lab Co-op)	Tom Morrison (Lib Dem)	Jilly Julian (Lib Dem)

indicates seat up for re-election.

== Elections in the 2020s ==
=== May 2022 ===
Cheadle Hulme North
Party	Candidate	Votes	%	±%
Labour Co-op	David Meller*	1,814	45.6	7 ▲
Liberal Democrats	Michael Hannon	1,578	39.6	1 ▲
Conservative	Brian Dougal	443	11.1	6 ▼
Green	Michael Padfield	136	3.4	Steady
Majority		236	6.0	6 ▲
Rejected ballots		9	0.2	
Turnout		3,980	39.9	Steady
Registered electors		9,987		
Labour Co-op hold		Swing	3 ▲	

=== May 2021 ===
2021
Party	Candidate	Votes	%	±%
Liberal Democrats	Jilly Julian	1,943	45	−6
Labour Co-op	Claire Vibert	1,618	37	+6
Conservative	Sue Carroll	639	15	+7
Green	Michael Padfield	157	4	−
Majority		325		
Turnout		4,375	44	
Registered electors		10,043		
Liberal Democrats hold		Swing		

== Elections in the 2010s ==
=== May 2019 ===
2019
Party	Candidate	Votes	%	±%
Liberal Democrats	Tom Morrison	2,069	51	
Labour	Rachel Wise	1,239	31	
Conservative	Bob Stevenson	317	8	
UKIP	Taff Davies	268	7	
Green	Michael John Padfield	153	4	
Majority		830		
Turnout		4,046	40	
Liberal Democrats hold		Swing		

=== May 2018 ===
2018
Party	Candidate	Votes	%	±%
Labour Co-op	David Meller	1,577	39	
Liberal Democrats	Claire Halliwell	1,575	39	
Conservative	Bob Stevenson	684	17	
Green	Michael Padfield	101	3	
UKIP	Taff Davies	71	2	
Majority		2		
Turnout		4,008	40	
Labour Co-op gain from Liberal Democrats		Swing		

=== May 2016 ===
2016
Party	Candidate	Votes	%	±%
Liberal Democrats	John Pantall	1,709	47	
Labour	Liz Marron	824	22	
Conservative	Natalie Fenton	587	16	
UKIP	Taff Davies	409	11	
Green	Michael Padfield	144	4	
Majority		885		
Turnout		3,673	37	
Liberal Democrats hold		Swing		

=== May 2015 ===
2015
Party	Candidate	Votes	%	±%
Liberal Democrats	Paul Porgess	2,605	37	
Conservative	Sue Carroll	1,735	25	
Labour	Yvonne Guariento	1,480	21	
UKIP	Taff Davies	842	12	
Green	Michael John Padfield	368	5	
Majority		870		
Turnout		7,030	73	
Liberal Democrats hold		Swing		

=== May 2014 ===
2014
Party	Candidate	Votes	%	±%
Liberal Democrats	June Somekh	1,307	36%	−16.44%
Labour	Yvonne Maureen Guariento	780	21%	−8.32%
Conservative	Sue Carroll	679	18%	−0.24%
UKIP	Tony Moore	668	18%	N/A
Green	Michael John Padfield	225	6%	N/A
Majority		527	15%	
Turnout		3659		
Liberal Democrats hold		Swing		

=== May 2012 ===
2012
Party	Candidate	Votes	%	±%
Liberal Democrats	John Pantall	1,762	52.44	−4.39
Labour	Emily Hewson	985	29.32	+22.78
Conservative	Chris Green	613	18.24	−13.01
Majority		777	23.13	
Turnout		3,384	33.27	
Liberal Democrats hold		Swing		

=== May 2011 ===
2011
Party	Candidate	Votes	%	±%
Liberal Democrats	Paul Porgess	1,753		
Labour	Matthew Baker	1,188		
Conservative	Robert Stevenson	984		
UKIP	Hilda Peake	268		
Majority		565		
Turnout		4,213	41.46	
Liberal Democrats hold		Swing		
