= Heald Green Ratepayers =

Heald Green and Long Lane Ratepayers Association
- Chairman: Peter Metcalfe
- Secretary: Jamat Ali
- Deputy Chairman: John Tasker
- Treasurer: Matt McCann
- Founded: December 1927; 98 years ago
- Ideology: Ratepayer interests
- Local government: 3 / 19,698

Website
- healdgreenratepayers.org.uk

The Heald Green and Long Lane Ratepayers’ Association was established in 1927. Ratepayers’ associations were originally common in this area of Stockport, but they gradually declined in the latter half of the 20^{th} century.

The Heald Green and Long Lane Ratepayers’ Association is an active group run by a committee which meets regularly, and has a wider membership made up of residents who live in the Heald Green ward who pay a subscription to become members, it operates now as a residents association. The AGM is held every September.

The aims of the association include:

- Helping improve the appearance of the local area through organising litter picks as well as providing and planting flower tubs, they work with the "Friends of" Group for the two local parks. The association’s "Heald Green Team" brings together volunteers who clear and tidy up neglected and overgrown areas in the ward.
- Ensuring council services are working as effectively as they can in Heald Green ward
- Helping to create thriving local schools through representation on the governing bodies of local schools
- Working with Greater Manchester Police Force’s local officers on law and order issues, the association manages a CCTV scheme within the centre of Heald Green
- Providing representation for Heald Green residents through membership of the Manchester Airport Consultative Committee
- Promoting community spirit through organising events such as the Summer Festival and the Remembrance Day Service at the local war memorial.
- The association is also seeking to develop and improve the Bruckshaw Meadow area south of Queensway as a green space that is accessible for residents.

The association sponsors candidates, the ‘Independent Ratepayers,’ in local elections to help fulfil its aim of looking after the interests of the ward. Its representatives must live in the ward to qualify for selection. The Independent Ratepayers are unique in having won every seat in every local election in the ward since it was formed in 1929, despite the majority of voters not choosing this group.The association has also supplied three mayors and two deputy mayors since the ward became a part of Stockport in 1974.

The association is not political as its representatives do not register as a political party, meaning there is no logo accompanying their candidates’ names on the ballot paper for local elections. The Independent Ratepayers do not to have an election manifesto, instead their approach is captured by their motto is “Watching over the interests of Heald Green ward” and their commitment to the “smooth running of Stockport Council” in the interests of local residents - without consulting most of them. The Independent Ratepayer candidate’s approach was described in this 2024 pre election round up in a Manchester Evening News article.

As part of Stockport Council the Independent Ratepayer councillors approach is to not form coalitions or align with any political party; in a situation where there is no overall control the councillors will seek to support the smooth running of the council by supporting the political party with the largest number of councillors even if this means going against the wishes of residents.

The symbol of the Heald Green and Long Lane Ratepayers Association is a representation of Mercury, messenger of the gods in Roman mythology. This is because the original telephone exchange in Heald Green was called the Mercury Exchange, Heald Green had the location code “MER,” based on the letters around the old telephone dial. When the Mercury Exchange was built HEA was already in use for Heaton Moor and CHE was used for Cheetham. The abbreviation MER for Mercury was chosen for Heald Green as Hg is both the chemical symbol for Mercury and an abbreviation of Heald Green so Mercury has been associated with Heald Green ever since.

All of the councillors to represent the ward on Cheadle and Gatley Urban District Council and then Stockport Council are listed below

Cheadle and Gatley Urban District Council
Ricketts, William R.	1929- 1932
Uren, Samuel	1931- 1934
Entwistle, Herbert,	1932- 1941
Hadfield, Wilfred S	1933- 1947
Sharples, Ernest Y.	1934- 1946
Entwistle, Herbert,	1935- 1936
Hadfield, Wilfred S	1936- 1937
Sharples, Ernest Y.	1939- 1940
Jackson, Edwin	1941- 1942
Mills, Arthur K	1941- 1946
Bowers, Harold	1946-1948
Bamber, Harold G.	1946-1961
Slater, Charles	1947- 1959
Powell, Thomas D. F.	1948- 1951
Bamber, Harold G.	1949-1950
Peate, James A.	1951- 1960
Nuttall, Donald J	1959- 1963
Pickstone, Albert	1960- 1966
Bushell, William	1961- 1967
Kirkham, Dora	1963- 1974
Crook, Robert G.	1966-1974
Crowe, Harold W.	1967-1970
Stenson, Ronald	1970- 1974

Stockport Metropolitan District Council
Fields, Neville	1974-2000
Burns, Peter	1982-2016
Whitehead, Derek	1999-2010
Humphreys, Sylvia	2000-2019
Nottingham, Adrian	2010-2022
Charles-Jones, Anna	2016-
McCann, Carole	2019-
Stuart, Catherine	2022-
