= Heald Green (ward) =

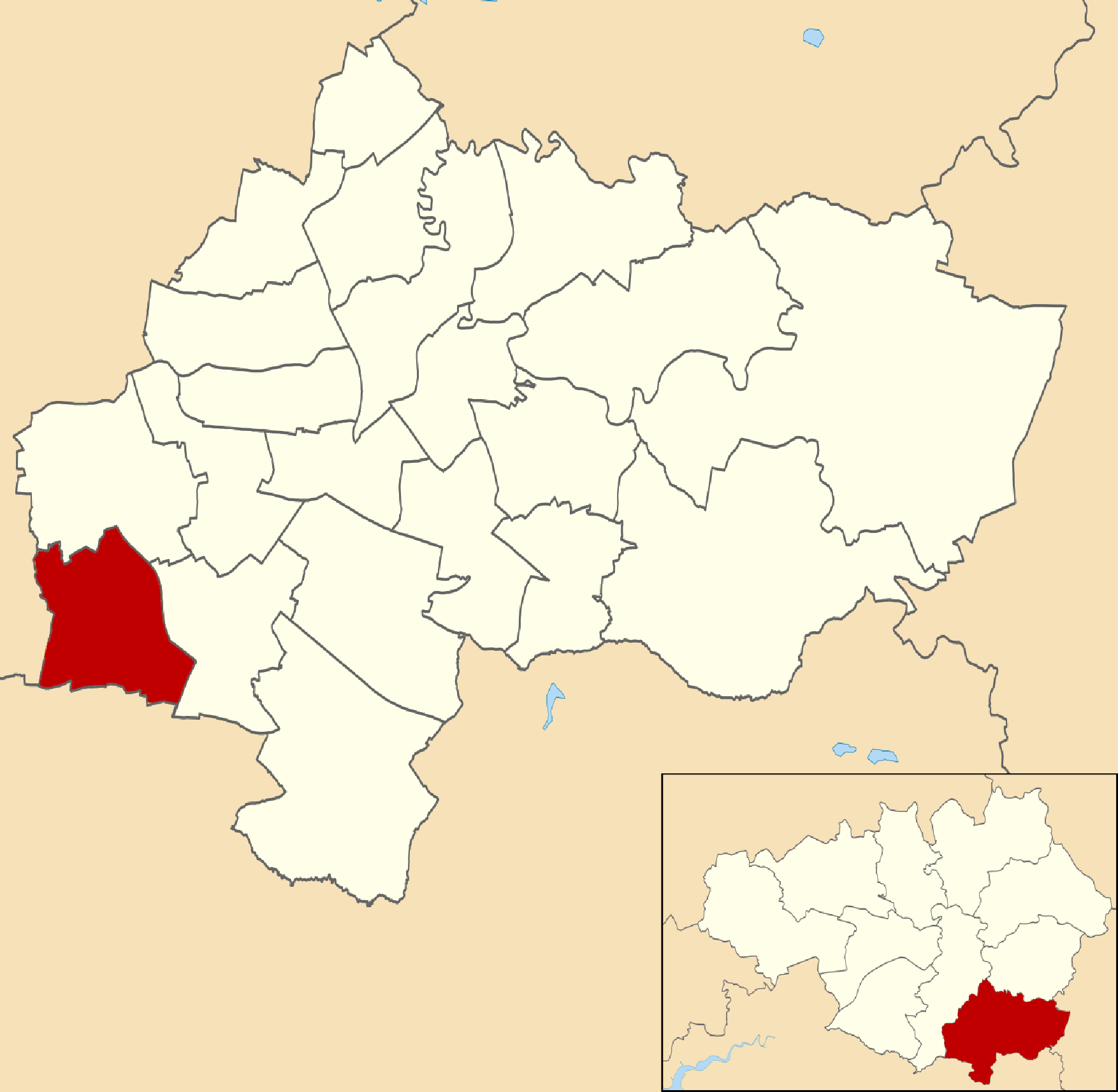
- Heald Green within Stockport
- Population: 10,027 (2010)
- Country: England
- Sovereign state: United Kingdom
- UK Parliament: Cheadle
- Councillors: Catherine Stuart (Independent); Carole McCann (Independent); Anna Charles-Jones (Independent)

Heald Green is an electoral ward in the Metropolitan Borough of Stockport. It elects three Councillors to Stockport Metropolitan Borough Council using the first past the post electoral method, electing each Councillor for a four-year term with no election every fourth year.

The ward is in the south-west of Stockport and has a railway station with services to Manchester and Manchester Airport.

All three seats are currently held by independents representing the Heald Green and Long Lane Ratepayers Association.

== Councillors ==
Heald Green electoral ward is represented in Westminster by Tom Morrison MP for Cheadle.

The ward is represented on Stockport Council by three councillors: Catherine Stuart (Independent); Carole McCann (Independent); and Anna Charles-Jones (Independent).

Election	Councillor	Councillor	Councillor
1995	Neville Fields	Ronald Stenson	Peter Burns
1996	Derek Whitehead	Ronald Stenson	Peter Burns
1998	Derek Whitehead	Ronald Stenson	Peter Burns
1999	Derek Whitehead	Ronald Stenson	Peter Burns
2000	Derek Whitehead	Sylvia Humphreys	Peter Burns
2002	Derek Whitehead	Sylvia Humphreys	Peter Burns
2003	Derek Whitehead	Sylvia Humphreys	Peter Burns
2004	Derek Whitehead	Sylvia Humphreys	Peter Burns
2006	Derek Whitehead	Sylvia Humphreys	Peter Burns
2007	Derek Whitehead	Sylvia Humphreys	Peter Burns
2008	Derek Whitehead	Sylvia Humphreys	Peter Burns
2010	Adrian Nottingham	Sylvia Humphreys	Peter Burns
2011	Adrian Nottingham	Sylvia Humphreys	Peter Burns
2012	Adrian Nottingham	Sylvia Humphreys	Peter Burns
2014	Adrian Nottingham	Sylvia Humphreys	Peter Burns
2015	Adrian Nottingham	Sylvia Humphreys	Peter Burns
2016	Adrian Nottingham	Sylvia Humphreys	Anna Charles-Jones
2018	Adrian Nottingham	Sylvia Humphreys	Anna Charles-Jones
2019	Adrian Nottingham	Carole McCann	Anna Charles-Jones
2021	Adrian Nottingham	Carole McCann	Anna Charles-Jones
2022	Catherine Stuart	Carole McCann	Anna Charles-Jones
2023	Catherine Stuart	Carole McCann	Anna Charles-Jones
2024	Catherine Stuart	Carole McCann	Anna Charles-Jones

indicates seat up for re-election.

== Elections in the 2020s ==
=== May 2024 ===
Heald Green
Party	Candidate	Votes	%	±%
Heald Green Ratepayers	Catherine Stuart*	1,787	43.3	+1.7
Liberal Democrats	Qasim Ahmed	1,143	27.7	+0.6
Labour	Kath Priestley	626	15.2	−1.9
Conservative	Yvonne Salmons	383	9.3	+1.3
Green	Chitra Ramachandran	189	4.6	−0.9
Majority		644	15.6	
Turnout		4,151	37.5	+4.1
Registered electors		11,077		
Heald Green Ratepayers hold		Swing		

=== May 2023 ===
Because of boundary changes made in November 2022, all three seats were contested in 2023. This election took place using the plurality block voting system. Carole McCann will serve a four year term ending in 2027, Anna Charles-Jones will serve a three year term ending in 2026 and Catherine Stuart will serve a one year term ending in 2024.

Heald Green (3)
Party	Candidate	Votes	%
Heald Green Ratepayers	Carole McCann	1,663	45.6
Heald Green Ratepayers	Anna Charles-Jones	1,625	44.6
Heald Green Ratepayers	Catherine Stuart	1,516	41.6
Liberal Democrats	Qasim Ahmed	988	27.1
Liberal Democrats	Gemma Bowker	893	24.5
Liberal Democrats	Iain Roberts	863	23.7
Labour	Kath Priestley	625	17.1
Labour	Colin Owen	563	15.4
Labour	Brian Preece	442	12.1
Conservative	Janice McGahan	302	8.3
Conservative	Yvonne Salmons	290	8.0
Conservative	Oliver Williamson	237	6.5
Green	Chitra Ramachandran	202	5.5
Rejected ballots		8	
Turnout		3,645	33.4
Total votes		10,209	
Registered electors		10,927	
Heald Green Ratepayers win (new seat)			
Heald Green Ratepayers win (new seat)			
Heald Green Ratepayers win (new seat)			

=== May 2022 ===
Heald Green
Party	Candidate	Votes	%	±%
Independent	Catherine Louise Stuart	1,552	50.5	−3.5
Liberal Democrats	Gemma Jane Bowker	520	16.9	+6.9
Labour	Kath Priestley	518	16.8	+0.8
Conservative	Yvonne Salmons	376	12.2	−0.8
Green	Chitra Ramachandran	109	3.5	−2.5
Majority		1,032		
Turnout		3,075	31.2	−5.8
Independent hold		Swing		

=== May 2021 ===
Heald Green
Party	Candidate	Votes	%	±%
Independent	Anna Charles-Jones	1,976	54	−15
Labour	Holly McCormack	592	16	+3
Conservative	Yvonne Salmons	469	13	+6
Liberal Democrats	Ian Hunter	380	10	+4
Green	Ian Brown	224	6	+1
Majority		1,447		
Turnout		3,665	37	
Independent hold		Swing		

== Elections in the 2010s ==
=== May 2019 ===
2019
Party	Candidate	Votes	%	±%
Independent	Carole McCann	2,393	69	
Labour	Joi Emily Amos	450	13	
Conservative	Yvonne Salmons	238	7	
Liberal Democrats	Jane Rosalind O'Neill	208	6	
Green	Richard Ian Brown	160	5	
Majority		1,943		
Turnout		3,449	35	
Independent hold		Swing		

=== May 2018 ===
2018
Party	Candidate	Votes	%	±%
Independent	Adrian Nottingham	2,056	59	+5
Labour	Laith Mahdi Gibani	608	17	+2
Conservative	Yvonne Salmons	416	12	+1
Liberal Democrats	Anna Walker	203	6	−2
Green	Richard Brown	114	3	+1.5
UKIP	Tony Moore	82	2	−7
Majority		1,448		
Turnout		3,479	35	
Independent hold		Swing		

=== May 2016 ===
2016
Party	Candidate	Votes	%	±%
Independent	Anna Charles-Jones	2,002	54	0
Labour	Kath Priestley	572	16	+2
Conservative	Yvonne Salmons	404	11	+2
UKIP	Tony Moore	347	9	–6
Liberal Democrats	Gahffar Karim	294	8	+1
Green	Camilla Luff	64	2	new
Majority		1,430		
Turnout		3,683	37	
Independent hold		Swing		

=== May 2015 ===
2015
Party	Candidate	Votes	%	±%
Independent	Eileen Sylvia Humphreys	2,788	41	
Conservative	Yvonne Salmons	1,145	17	
Labour	Kathryn Priestley	1,064	16	
Liberal Democrats	David Robert-Jones	820	12	
UKIP	Tony Moore	817	12	
Green	Gordon Combe	200	3	
Majority		1,643		
Turnout		6,834	68	
Independent hold		Swing		

=== May 2014 ===
2014
Party	Candidate	Votes	%	±%
Independent	Adrian Nottingham	2,010	54%	−16.59%
UKIP	Ann Moore	547	15%	N/A
Labour	Kathryn Ann Priestley	531	14%	+1.09%
Conservative	Yvonne Salmons	333	9%	+2.65%
Liberal Democrats	David Roberts-Jones	269	7%	+0.47%
Majority		1463	39%	−18.37%
Turnout		3690		
Independent hold		Swing		

=== May 2012 ===
2012
Party	Candidate	Votes	%	±%
Independent	Peter Burns	2,303	70.28	+1.76
Labour	Martin Miller	423	12.91	+7.70
Liberal Democrats	David Robert-Jones	214	6.53	−2.77
Conservative	Patricia Leck	208	6.35	−4.11
BNP	Richard Skill	129	3.94	−2.59
Majority		1,880	57.37	
Turnout		3,284	32.89	
Independent hold		Swing		

=== May 2011 ===
2011
Party	Candidate	Votes	%	±%
Independent	Sylvia Humphreys	2,690		
Labour	Kathryn Priestley	526		
Conservative	Pat Leck	389		
Liberal Democrats	Eric Brindley	322		
BNP	Richard Skill	170		
Majority		2,164		
Turnout		4,120	41.29	
Independent hold		Swing		
