= 2008 Stockport Metropolitan Borough Council election =

2008 UK local government election

Map showing the results of the 2008 Stockport Metropolitan Borough Council elections by ward.

Elections to Stockport Metropolitan Borough Council were held on 1 May 2008. One third of the council was up for election. The Liberal Democrats held overall control of the council.

The council is currently made up of;

Party	Seats	+/-	% votes
Liberal Democrat	36	0	
Labour	14	-1	
Conservative	10	+1	
Heald Green Ratepayer	3	0	

== Summary ==
There were two main changes at this election. In the Cheadle & Gatley ward, incumbent councillor Paul Carter of the Liberal Democrats lost his seat to the Conservative candidate Mick Jones. Similarly in the Brinnington and Central Ward, Labour councillor Maureen Rowles lost her seat to the Liberal Democrat candidate Christian Walker.

The following summary indicates the number of seats which are being defended by each party.

Stockport Council election, 2008 - Summary
Party	Seats	Gains	Losses	Net gain/loss	Seats %	Votes %	Votes	+/−
Liberal Democrats	12	1	1	0	57.1	39.6	31,655	0
Conservative	4	1	0	+1	19.0	35.2	28,127	0
Labour	4	0	1	-1	19.0	15.9	12,740	0
Independent	1	0	0	0	4.8	3.2	2,594	0
BNP	0	0	0	0	0.0	2.6	2,050	0
Green	0	0	0	0	0.0	2.3	1,818	0
UKIP	0	0	0	0	0.0	1.1	914	0

== Ward results ==
=== Bramhall North ward ===
Bramhall North
Party	Candidate	Votes	%	±%
Conservative	Linda Holt	3,043	56.3	
Liberal Democrats	John Ellis	2,018	37.3	
Labour	Kathryn Priestley	140	2.6	
BNP	David Gordon	123	2.3	
UKIP	Malcolm Crossley	84	1.6	
Majority		1,025	19.0	
Conservative hold		Swing		

=== Bramhall South ward ===
Bramhall South
Party	Candidate	Votes	%	±%
Conservative	Brian Bagnall*	2,762	59.4	
Liberal Democrats	Keith Holloway	1,554	33.4	
Labour	Beryl Dykes	170	3.7	
UKIP	David Perry	163	3.5	
Majority		1,208	26.0	
Conservative hold		Swing		

=== Bredbury and Woodley ward ===
Bredbury and Woodley
Party	Candidate	Votes	%	±%
Liberal Democrats	Stella Humphries	2,056	61.0	
Conservative	Jamie Holland	996	29.5	
Labour	Clifford Stanway	321	9.5	
Majority		1,060	31.5	
Liberal Democrats hold		Swing		

=== Bredbury Green and Romiley ward ===
Bredbury Green and Romiley
Party	Candidate	Votes	%	±%
Liberal Democrats	Hazel Lees	2,159	48.0	
Conservative	John Rogers	2,040	45.3	
Labour	Bill Cawley	303	6.7	
Majority		119	2.7	
Liberal Democrats hold		Swing		

=== Brinnington and Central ward ===
A month after the election Councillor Chris Walker was charged with racist abuse of a police officer and suspended by the Liberal Democrats and served as an Independent councillor, he was found guilty in April 2010. Walker returned to the Lib Dems in November 2010. He declared himself Independent again in June 2011. He did not try to defend the seat at the May 2012 election.

Brinnington and Central
Party	Candidate	Votes	%	±%
Liberal Democrats	Chris Walker	1,264	46.9	
Labour	Maureen Rowles	1,009	37.5	
Conservative	Steve Holgate	259	9.6	
Green	Phil Shaw	162	6.0	
Majority		255	9.4	
Liberal Democrats gain from Labour		Swing		

=== Cheadle and Gatley ward ===
Cheadle and Gatley
Party	Candidate	Votes	%	±%
Conservative	Mick Jones	2,194	45.8	
Liberal Democrats	Paul Carter	2,177	45.4	
Labour	Colin Owen	420	8.8	
Majority		17	0.4	
Conservative gain from Liberal Democrats		Swing		

=== Cheadle Hulme North ward ===
Cheadle Hulme North
Party	Candidate	Votes	%	±%
Liberal Democrats	John Pantall	2,009	56.8	
Conservative	Christopher Ashley	1,105	31.3	
Labour	Brian Harrop	231	6.5	
UKIP	Hilda Peake	190	5.4	
Majority		904	25.5	
Liberal Democrats hold		Swing		

=== Cheadle Hulme South ward ===
Cheadle Hulme South
Party	Candidate	Votes	%	±%
Liberal Democrats	Lenny Grice	2,215	51.3	
Conservative	Mark Roscoe	1,702	39.4	
Green	David Leaver	141	3.3	
Labour	Linda Sinclair	131	3.1	
UKIP	Cyril Peake	126	2.9	
Majority		513	11.9	
Liberal Democrats hold		Swing		

=== Davenport and Cale Green ward ===
Davenport and Cale Green
Party	Candidate	Votes	%	±%
Liberal Democrats	Ann Smith	1,427	45.4	
Labour Co-op	Brian Hendley	903	28.7	
Conservative	Chris Holgate	589	18.7	
BNP	Steven Flood	224	7.1	
Majority		524	16.7	
Liberal Democrats hold		Swing		

=== Edgeley and Cheadle Heath ward ===
Edgeley and Cheadle Heath
Party	Candidate	Votes	%	±%
Labour	Sheila Bailey	1,447	46.7	
Liberal Democrats	Andrew Rawling	972	31.4	
Conservative	Beryl Charlesworth	481	15.5	
Green	Vanessa Kellaway	199	6.4	
Majority		475	15.3	
Labour hold		Swing		

=== Hazel Grove ward ===
Hazel Grove
Party	Candidate	Votes	%	±%
Liberal Democrats	Kevin Hogg	2,345	54.9	
Conservative	Julian Lewis-Booth	1,668	39.0	
Labour	Yvonne Bradley	262	6.1	
Majority		677	15.9	
Liberal Democrats hold		Swing		

=== Heald Green ward ===
Heald Green
Party	Candidate	Votes	%	±%
Independent	Peter Burns	2,594	68.5	
Conservative	Robert Stevenson	396	10.5	
Liberal Democrats	Iain Roberts	352	9.3	
BNP	Richard Skill	247	6.5	
Labour	Peter Jackson	197	5.2	
Majority		2,198	58.0	
Independent hold		Swing		

=== Heatons North ward ===
Heatons North
Party	Candidate	Votes	%	±%
Conservative	Les Jones	2,069	52.9	
Labour	Margaret Pollard	1,000	25.6	
Liberal Democrats	Kevin Dowling	358	9.1	
Green	Janet Cuff	336	8.6	
UKIP	Gerald Price	150	3.8	
Majority		1,069	27.3	
Conservative hold		Swing		

=== Heatons South ward ===
Heatons South
Party	Candidate	Votes	%	±%
Labour	Colin Foster	1,796	45.3	
Conservative	Alex Raisbeck	1,468	29.6	
Liberal Democrats	Ronald Axtell	408	10.3	
Green	Peter Barber	292	7.4	
Majority		328	15.7	
Labour hold		Swing		

=== Manor ward ===
Manor
Party	Candidate	Votes	%	±%
Liberal Democrats	Sue Derbyshire	1,435	45.4	
Labour	Brigitte Lechner	739	23.4	
Conservative	Barry Charlesworth	551	17.4	
BNP	Duncan Warner	437	13.8	
Majority		696	22.0	
Liberal Democrats hold		Swing		

=== Marple North ward ===
Marple North
Party	Candidate	Votes	%	±%
Liberal Democrats	Martin Candler	2,162	51.2	
Conservative	Cath Walsh	1,502	35.6	
Green	Maggie Preston	340	8.1	
Labour	David Rowbottom	215	5.1	
Majority		660	15.6	
Liberal Democrats hold		Swing		

=== Marple South ward ===
Marple South
Party	Candidate	Votes	%	±%
Liberal Democrats	Shan Alexander	2,051	51.6	
Conservative	William Wragg	1,391	35.0	
UKIP	Tony Moore	201	5.1	
Green	Graham Reid	180	4.5	
Labour	Karen Vickers	151	3.8	
Majority		660	16.6	
Liberal Democrats hold		Swing		

=== Offerton ward ===
Offerton
Party	Candidate	Votes	%	±%
Liberal Democrats	Dave Goddard	1,602	48.8	
Conservative	Nikki Lewis-Booth	738	22.5	
BNP	Stephen Maher	617	18.8	
Labour	Susan Ball	326	9.9	
Majority		864	26.3	
Liberal Democrats hold		Swing		

=== Reddish North ward ===
Reddish North
Party	Candidate	Votes	%	±%
Labour	Anne Graham	1,341	48.5	
Conservative	Tony Hannay	699	25.3	
BNP	Paul Bennett	402	14.5	
Liberal Democrats	Peter Weigert	321	11.6	
Majority		642	23.2	
Labour hold		Swing		

=== Reddish South ward ===
Reddish South
Party	Candidate	Votes	%	±%
Labour	Andrew Verdeille	1,382	49.5	
Conservative	Steve Burt	917	32.8	
Liberal Democrats	Danny Langley	494	17.7	
Majority		465	16.7	
Labour hold		Swing		

=== Stepping Hill ward ===
Stepping Hill
Party	Candidate	Votes	%	±%
Liberal Democrats	Maggie Clay	2,276	53.5	
Conservative	Michael Cunningham	1,557	36.6	
Labour	Janet Rothwell	256	6.0	
Green	Ken Pease	168	3.9	
Majority		719	16.9	
Liberal Democrats hold		Swing		

== Changes 2008–2010 ==
- Christian Walker, elected as a Liberal Democrat, left the party shortly after the election and sat as an independent. and then in 2011 declared himself independent again.

During 2009, which was a "fallow year" (one without scheduled elections), there were three by-elections following the deaths of serving councillors.
