= Offerton (ward) =

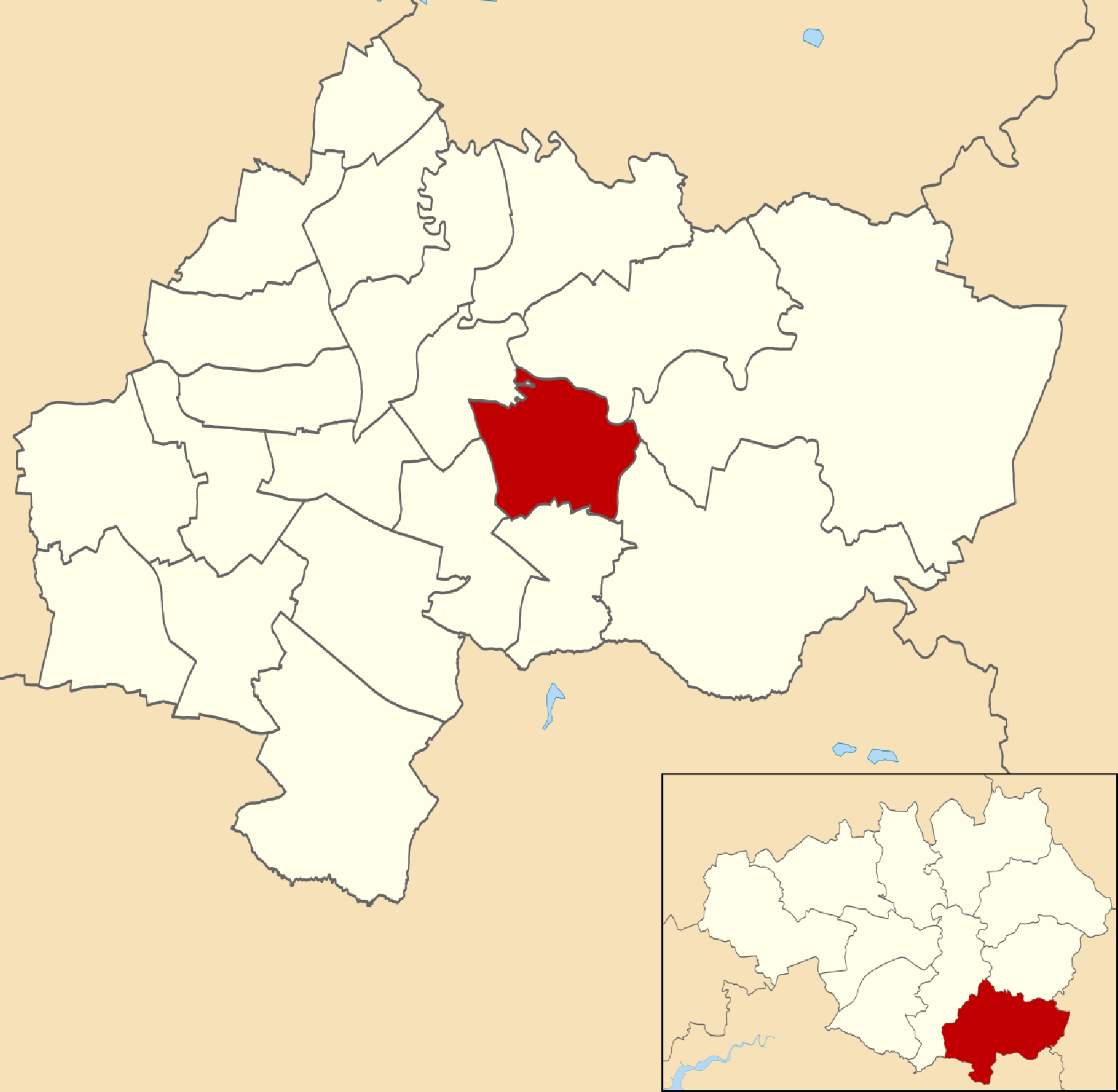
- Offerton within Stockport
- Population: 10,519 (2010)
- Country: England
- Sovereign state: United Kingdom
- UK Parliament: Hazel Grove
- Councillors: Will Dawson (Liberal Democrat); Wendy Meikle (Liberal Democrat); Oliver Harrison (Liberal Democrats)

Offerton is an electoral ward in the Metropolitan Borough of Stockport. It elects three Councillors to Stockport Metropolitan Borough Council using the first-past-the-post electoral method, electing one Councillor every year without election on the fourth.

Together with Bredbury and Woodley, Bredbury Green and Romiley, Hazel Grove, Manor, Marple North and Marple South and High Lane, and part of the Norbury and Woodsmoor ward the majority of the ward falls within the Hazel Grove Parliamentary constituency. Part of the Offerton ward (polling districts OF2 and OF7) falls within the Cheadle constituency.

Offerton Ward was home to the former Offerton High School.

Offerton Ward is located near the centre of the borough and is bordered by Bramhall North, Bredbury Green & Romiley, Hazel Grove, Manor and Norbury & Woodsmoor.

The ward was also the seat of former Council Leader Dave Goddard, who in 2012 lost his seat to Laura Booth of the Labour Party, who later became a Lib Dem. Goddard regained the seat in 2013 and held it until 2018, and is now a member of the House of Lords.

== Councillors ==
Offerton is represented in Westminster by Lisa Smart MP for Hazel Grove, and Tom Morrison MP for Cheadle.

The ward is represented on Stockport Council by three councillors:, Will Dawson (Lib Dem), Dan Oliver (Lib Dem), and Helen Hibbert (Labour).

Election	Councillor	Councillor	Councillor
2004	Tom Eric Pyle (Ind)	Wendy Meikle (Lib Dem)	Dave Goddard (Lib Dem)
2006	John Smith (Lib Dem)	Wendy Meikle (Lib Dem)	Dave Goddard (Lib Dem)
2007	John Smith (Lib Dem)	Wendy Meikle (Lib Dem)	Dave Goddard (Lib Dem)
2008	John Smith (Lib Dem)	Wendy Meikle (Lib Dem)	Dave Goddard (Lib Dem)
2010	John Smith (Lib Dem)	Wendy Meikle (Lib Dem)	Dave Goddard (Lib Dem)
2011	John Smith (Lib Dem)	Wendy Meikle (Lib Dem)	Dave Goddard (Lib Dem)
January 2012	John Smith (Con)	Wendy Meikle (Lib Dem)	Dave Goddard (Lib Dem)
May 2012	John Smith (Con)	Wendy Meikle (Lib Dem)	Laura Booth (Lab)
2014	Dave Goddard (Lib Dem)	Wendy Meikle (Lib Dem)	Laura Booth (Lab)
October 2014	Dave Goddard (Lib Dem)	Wendy Meikle (Lib Dem)	Laura Booth (Ind)
April 2015	Dave Goddard (Lib Dem)	Wendy Meikle (Lib Dem)	Laura Booth (Lib Dem)
May 2015	Dave Goddard (Lib Dem)	Wendy Meikle (Lib Dem)	Laura Booth (Lib Dem)
2016	Dave Goddard (Lib Dem)	Wendy Meikle (Lib Dem)	Laura Booth (Lib Dem)
April 2018	Dave Goddard (Lib Dem)	Wendy Meikle (Lib Dem)	Laura Booth (Ind)
May 2018	Will Dawson (Lib Dem)	Wendy Meikle (Lib Dem)	Laura Booth (Lab)
2019	Will Dawson (Lib Dem)	Wendy Meikle (Lib Dem)	Laura Booth (Lab)
2021	Will Dawson (Lib Dem)	Wendy Meikle (Lib Dem)	Oliver Harrison (Lib Dem)
2022	Will Dawson (Lib Dem)	Wendy Meikle (Lib Dem)	Oliver Harrison (Lib Dem)
2023	Will Dawson (Lib Dem)	Helen Hibbert (Lab)	Will Sharp (Lab)
2024	Will Dawson (Lib Dem)	Helen Hibbert (Lab)	Dan Oliver (Lib Dem)

indicates seat up for re-election. indicates councillor defected.

== Elections in the 2020s ==
=== May 2024 ===
Offerton
Party	Candidate	Votes	%	±%
Liberal Democrats	Dan Oliver	1,512	39.5	+1.2
Labour	Will Sharp*	1,487	38.9	+0.3
Reform	John Kelly	337	8.8	+4.0
Conservative	Andrew Lord	287	7.5	−5.6
Green	Steve Torley	203	5.3	−4.9
Majority		25	0.7	
Turnout		3,841	34.4	+1.1
Registered electors		11,162		
Liberal Democrats gain from Labour		Swing		

=== May 2023 ===
Offerton (3)
Party	Candidate	Votes	%
Liberal Democrats	Will Dawson	1,664	44.8
Labour	Helen Hibbert	1,479	39.8
Labour	Will Sharp	1,431	38.6
Liberal Democrats	Oliver Harrison	1,421	38.3
Labour	Pauline Sheaff	1,338	36.0
Liberal Democrats	Mark Weldon	1,182	31.8
Conservative	Michael Butler	486	13.1
Conservative	Sally Bennett	391	10.5
Green	Steve Torley	377	10.2
Conservative	Susan Ward	270	7.3
Reform	John Kelly	178	4.8
Rejected ballots		16	
Turnout		3,712	33.3
Total votes		10,217	
Registered electors		11,160	
Liberal Democrats win (new seat)			
Labour win (new seat)			
Labour win (new seat)			

=== May 2022 ===
Offerton
Party	Candidate	Votes	%	±%
Liberal Democrats	Will Dawson*	1,516	45.5	+10
Labour	Will Sharp	950	28.5	−3
Conservative	Andrew Baker	672	20.2	−5
Green	Simon Edge	91	2.7	−1
Reform	John Kelly	91	2.7	±0
Majority		566	17.0	
Rejected ballots		10	0.3	
Turnout		3,330	32.5	−2
Registered electors		10,251		
Liberal Democrats hold		Swing		

=== May 2021 ===
Offerton
Party	Candidate	Votes	%	±%
Liberal Democrats	Oliver Harrison	1,280	36	−21
Labour	Joe Barratt	1,138	32	+15
Conservative	Tony Moore	886	25	+8
Green	Simon Edge	141	4	−6
Reform	John Kelly	110	3	New
Majority		142		
Turnout		3,572	35	
Registered electors		10,305		
Liberal Democrats hold		Swing		

== Elections in the 2010s ==
=== May 2019 ===
2019
Party	Candidate	Votes	%	±%
Liberal Democrats	Wendy Meikle	1,581	57	
Conservative	Michael Frank Butler	473	17	
Labour	James Thomas Pelham	469	17	
Green	Simon Edge	274	10	
Majority		1,108		
Turnout		2,797	27	
Liberal Democrats hold		Swing		

=== May 2018 ===
2018
Party	Candidate	Votes	%	±%
Liberal Democrats	Will Dawson	1,973	52	
Labour	Dan Oliver	1,117	30	
Conservative	Darran Palmer	587	16	
Green	Simon Edge	89	2	
Majority		856		
Turnout		3,766	34	
Liberal Democrats hold		Swing		

=== May 2016 ===
Laura Booth left Labour in 2014 and joined the Lib Dems in 2015 and rejoined Labour in 2018

2016
Party	Candidate	Votes	%	±%
Liberal Democrats	Laura Booth	1,282	35	
Labour	Janet Glover	1,000	27	
UKIP	Darran Palmer	666	18	
Conservative	Richard Britton	614	17	
Green	Simon Edge	88	2	
Majority		282		
Turnout		3,650	36	
Liberal Democrats gain from Labour		Swing		

=== May 2015 ===
2015
Party	Candidate	Votes	%	±%
Liberal Democrats	Wendy Meikle	2,049	31	
Conservative	Tom Dowse	1,781	27	
Labour	Charlie Stewart	1,460	22	
UKIP	Grahame Bradbury	1,115	17	
Green	Hannah Arnold	209	3	
Majority		268		
Turnout		6,614	63	
Liberal Democrats hold		Swing		

=== May 2014 ===
2014
Party	Candidate	Votes	%	±%
Liberal Democrats	Dave Goddard	1,159	32%	−3.58%
Labour	Charlie Stewart	1,052	29%	−7.81
UKIP	Harry Perry	843	23%	+13.46%
Conservative	Bill Law	557	15%	−3.07%
Majority		107	3%	
Turnout		3,611		
Liberal Democrats gain from Conservative		Swing		

=== May 2012 ===
Laura Booth left Labour in 2014 and joined the Lib Dems in 2015. She was re-elected as the Lib Dem councillor for Offerton in 2016.

2012
Party	Candidate	Votes	%	±%
Labour	Laura Booth	1,346	36.81	+26.88
Liberal Democrats	Dave Goddard	1,301	35.58	−13.22
Conservative	Steve Rodriquez	661	18.07	−4.05
UKIP	Harry Perry	349	9.54	N/A
Majority		45	1.23	
Turnout		3,663	34.95	
Labour gain from Liberal Democrats		Swing		

=== May 2011 ===
2011
Party	Candidate	Votes	%	±%
Liberal Democrats	Wendy Meikle	1,404	36.8	
Labour	Laura Booth	1,203	31.6	
Conservative	Julie Dawn Wragg	804	21.1	
UKIP	Harry Perry	386	10.1	
Majority		201		
Turnout		3,811	36.32	
Liberal Democrats hold		Swing		
