= 2014 Stockport Metropolitan Borough Council election =

2014 UK local government election

Stockport Metropolitan Council Election, 2014
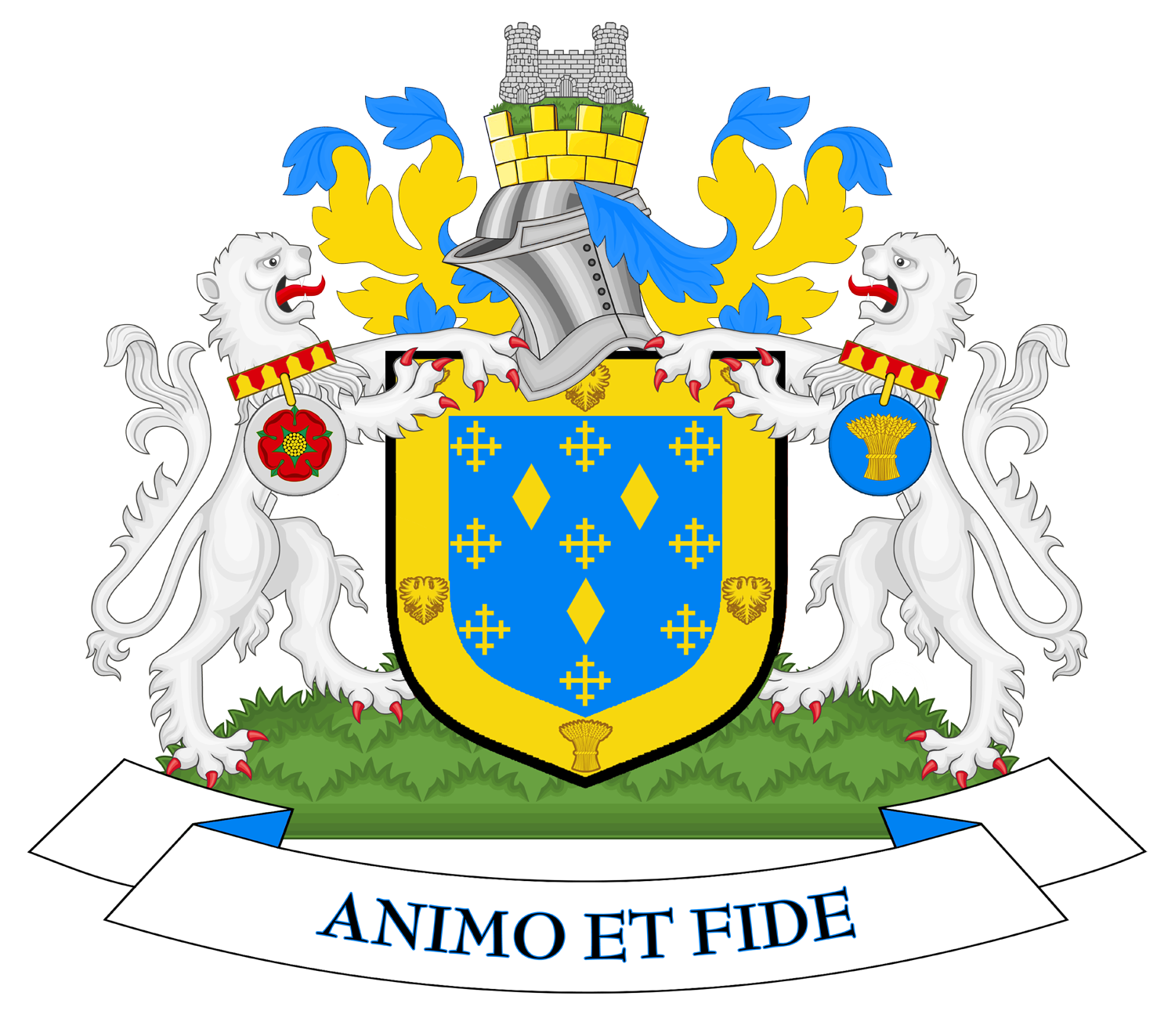
- 22 May 2014

21 Seats up for Election
	First party	Second party
Leader	Sue Derbyshire	Andrew Verdeille
Party	Liberal Democrats	Labour
Leader's seat	Manor	Reddish South
Seats before	29	21
Seats won	9	7
Seats after	28	22
Seat change	▼1	▲1
	Third party	Fourth party
Leader	Syd Lloyd	Peter Burns
Party	Conservative	Heald Green Ratepayers
Leader's seat	Bredbury Green & Romiley	Heald Green
Seats before	10	3
Seats won	4	1
Seats after	10	3
Seat change	Steady	Steady
- Map showing the results of the 2014 Stockport Metropolitan Borough Council elections by ward. Red shows Labour seats, blue shows the Conservatives, yellow shows the Liberal Democrats and green the Heald Green Ratepayers.
Leader of the Council before election
Sue Derbyshire
Liberal Democrats
Leader of the Council
Sue Derbyshire
Liberal Democrats

Elections to Stockport Metropolitan Borough Council took place on 22 May 2014. They coincided with other local elections happening on this day across the UK, as well as the 2014 elections to the European Parliament.

Stockport Council is elected in thirds which means that in each three member local ward, one councillor is elected every year, except every four years which is classed as fallow year. The previous fallow year was 2013, when no local government elections took place in the borough.

Following the elections, the Lib Dem minority run administration was able to continue in office.

== State of the Parties ==
Going into the election the Liberal Democrats hold 29 seats, the Labour Party on 21, The Conservatives on 10 and the Heald Green Independent Rate Payers holding 3. Following the election the state of the Parties is as follows: Liberal Democrats: 28, Labour: 22, Conservatives: 10, Heald Green Rate Payers: 3.

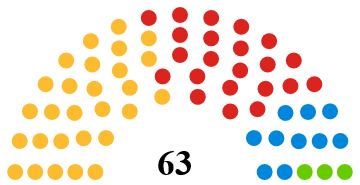
Stockport Council Composition 2014

In the 2014 election 7 parties contested seats throughout the borough and gained the following vote shares:

Party	Seats Won	Vote Share
Liberal Democrats	9	26%
Labour	7	29%
Conservatives	4	23%
Heald Green Ratepayers	1	3%
UKIP	0	13%
Green Party	0	4%
BNP	0	1%

In the 2014/15 year there were several defections. Three from Labour to sit as Independents, and one from the Conservatives to UKIP.

== Election results by ward ==
Asterisk (*) indicates incumbent in the ward, and bold names highlight winning candidate.

=== Bramhall North ===
Bramhall North
Party	Candidate	Votes	%	±%
Conservative	Lisa Walker*	2,185	50%	−2.26%
Liberal Democrats	Pauline Banham	1076	24%	−11.86%
UKIP	Ray Jones	594	14%	N/A
Labour	Elizabeth Nicola Marron	538	12%	+0.2%
Majority		1109	26%	+9.6%
Turnout		4393		
Conservative hold		Swing		

=== Bramhall South & Woodford ===
Bramhall South & Woodford
Party	Candidate	Votes	%	±%
Conservative	Anita Johnson	1,862	45%	−4.48%
Liberal Democrats	Jeremy Richard Meal	1373	33%	+6.78
UKIP	David Michael Perry	538	13%	+4.09
Labour	Ruth Kaiser	369	9%	−1.13%
Majority		489	12%	−11.26%
Turnout		4142		
Conservative hold		Swing		

Bramhall South & Woodford saw a By-Election in the ward in November 2014 due to the resignation of the incumbent Conservative councillor. The Conservatives held the seat.

=== Bredbury & Woodley ===
Bredbury & Woodley
Party	Candidate	Votes	%	±%
Liberal Democrats	Chris Gordon*	1,349	36%	−5.19%
Labour	Roy Edward Driver	998	26%	−9.6%
UKIP	Richard Ellis	834	22%	N/A
Conservative	Sue Howard	498	13%	−1.49%
BNP	Andy Webster	89	2%	−6.71%
Majority		351	10%	+4.41%
Turnout		3768		
Liberal Democrats hold		Swing		

=== Bredbury Green & Romiley ===
Mags Kirkham left the Lib Dems in April 2016 to become an Independent politician.

Bredbury Green & Romiley
Party	Candidate	Votes	%	±%
Liberal Democrats	Mags Kirkham*	1,350	33%	−8.14%
Conservative	Sally Bennett	1173	29%	−5.37
UKIP	Brian Stanyer	784	19%	N/A
Labour	Brian Anthony Wild	713	17%	−3.39%
BNP	Tony Dean	60	1%	−3.10%
Majority		177	4%	
Turnout		4080		
Liberal Democrats hold		Swing		

=== Brinnington & Central ===
Brinnington & Central
Party	Candidate	Votes	%	±%
Labour	Maureen Rowles*	1,540	57%	−13.4%
UKIP	Michael Buxton	633	23%	+11.20%
Liberal Democrats	Colin Gell	190	7%	−1.23%
Conservative	Pat Leck	181	7%	+0.37%
BNP	Brenda Waterhouse	93	3%	N/A
Independent	John Heginbotham	68	3%	+0.06%
Majority		907	34%	−24.61%
Turnout		2705		
Labour hold		Swing		

=== Cheadle & Gatley ===
Cheadle & Gatley
Party	Candidate	Votes	%	±%
Liberal Democrats	Iain Roberts*	2,176	45%	+2.48%
Conservative	Graham Michael Haslam	1078	22%	−15.08%
Labour	Colin Owen	781	16%	−4.40%
UKIP	Grahame Daniel Bradbury	630	13%	N/A
Green	Natasha Maria Brooks	216	4%	N/A
Majority		1098	23%	+17.55
Turnout		4881		
Liberal Democrats hold		Swing		

=== Cheadle Hulme North ===
Cheadle Hulme North
Party	Candidate	Votes	%	±%
Liberal Democrats	June Somekh*	1,307	36%	−16.44%
Labour	Yvonne Maureen Guariento	780	21%	−8.32%
Conservative	Sue Carroll	679	18%	−0.24%
UKIP	Tony Moore	668	18%	N/A
Green	Michael John Padfield	225	6%	N/A
Majority		527	15%	
Turnout		3659		
Liberal Democrats hold		Swing		

=== Cheadle Hulme South ===
Stuart Bodsworth defected to the Labour Party on the night of the 2016 local election.

Cheadle Hulme South
Party	Candidate	Votes	%	±%
Liberal Democrats	Stuart Andrew Bodsworth*	1,630	41%	−5.86%
Conservative	Paul Davies	1104	27%	−1.90%
UKIP	Cyril Arthur Peake	703	17%	+7.23%
Labour	Chris Carter	582	14%	−0.46%
Majority		526	14%	−3.96%
Turnout		4019		
Liberal Democrats hold		Swing		

=== Davenport & Cale Green ===
Davenport & Cale Green
Party	Candidate	Votes	%	±%
Labour	Elise Wilson	1,557	43%	−2.92%
Liberal Democrats	Ann Smith	900	25%	−13.01%
UKIP	Doreen Sheila Hopkins	650	18%	N/A
Conservative	Julie Wragg	282	8%	−0.59%
Green	Phil Shaw	245	7%	+0.66%
Majority		657	18%	
Turnout		3634		
Labour gain from Liberal Democrats		Swing		

=== Edgeley & Cheadle Heath ===
Edgeley & Cheadle Heath
Party	Candidate	Votes	%	±%
Labour	Philip Harding*	1,884	58%	−16.59%
UKIP	Chris Pamp	579	18%	N/A
Green	Camilla Luff	297	9%	+1.66%
Conservative	Morag White	267	8%	−1.61%
Liberal Democrats	Danny Langley	240	7%	−1.46%
Majority		1305	40%	−25%
Turnout		3267		
Labour hold		Swing		

=== Hazel Grove ===
Hazel Grove
Party	Candidate	Votes	%	±%
Conservative	Oliver James Johnstone	1,700	38%	−2.41%
Liberal Democrats	Stuart Corris*	1414	31%	−11.05%
UKIP	Tony Moore	692	15%	N/A
Labour	Janet Elizabeth Glover	488	11%	−6.54%
Green	Rob Turner	208	5%	N/A
Majority		286	7%	+5.35%
Turnout		4502		
Conservative gain from Liberal Democrats		Swing		

=== Heald Green ===
Heald Green
Party	Candidate	Votes	%	±%
Heald Green Ratepayers	Adrian Roger Nottingham*	2,010	54%	−16.59%
UKIP	Ann Moore	547	15%	N/A
Labour	Kathryn Ann Priestley	531	14%	+1.09%
Conservative	Yvonne Salmons	333	9%	+2.65%
Liberal Democrats	David Roberts-Jones	269	7%	+0.47%
Majority		1463	39%	−18.37%
Turnout		3690		
Heald Green Ratepayers hold		Swing		

=== Heatons North ===
Heatons North
Party	Candidate	Votes	%	±%
Labour	John Taylor	2,105	52%	+4.10%
Conservative	Rosalind Elaine Lloyd	1168	29%	−9.88%
Green	Janet Cuff	526	13%	+
Liberal Democrats	Jenny Humphreys	266	7%	+3.89%
Majority		937	23%	+13.99%
Turnout		4065		
Labour gain from Conservative		Swing		

=== Heatons South ===
Heatons South
Party	Candidate	Votes	%	±%
Labour	Tom McGee*	2,459	58%	−9.85%
Conservative	Natalie Louise Fenton	980	23%	+1.21%
Green	Conrad Clive Beard	410	10%	N/A
Liberal Democrats	Denise Brewster	247	6%	−0.87%
BNP	Sheila Mary Spink	165	4%	+0.51%
Majority		1479	35%	−11.06%
Turnout		4261		
Labour hold		Swing		

=== Manor ===
Manor
Party	Candidate	Votes	%	±%
Liberal Democrats	Daniel Hawthorne*	1,458	40%	−4.32%
Labour	Walter Barrett	1233	34%	−9.44%
UKIP	John Howard Kelly	660	18%	N/A
Conservative	Beverley Oliver	203	6%	+1.36%
BNP	Duncan Noel Warner	67	2%	−2.76%
Majority		225	6%	+5.25%
Turnout		3621		
Liberal Democrats hold		Swing		

=== Marple North ===
Marple North
Party	Candidate	Votes	%	±%
Liberal Democrats	Geoff Abell	1,580	37%	−4.77%
Conservative	Annette Claire Finnie	1248	29%	+2.02%
UKIP	Chelsea Helen Smith	539	13%	+3.81%
Labour	David Edward Rowbottom	538	13%	−1.10%
Green	Maggie Preston	328	8%	+0.78%
Majority		332	8%	−6.79
Turnout		4233		
Liberal Democrats hold		Swing		

=== Marple South ===
Marple South
Party	Candidate	Votes	%	±%
Liberal Democrats	Susan Ingham*	1,535	38%	−11.79%
Conservative	Bev Morley-Scott	950	23%	−0.67%
UKIP	Darran John Palmer	873	22%	+10.2%
Labour	Kevin Dolan	446	11%	−3.34%
Green	Graham Douglas Reid	254	6%	N/A
Majority		585	15%	−11.12
Turnout		4058		
Liberal Democrats hold		Swing		

=== Offerton ===
Offerton
Party	Candidate	Votes	%	±%
Liberal Democrats	Dave Goddard	1,159	32%	−3.58%
Labour	Charlie Stewart	1052	29%	−7.81
UKIP	Harry Perry	843	23%	+13.46%
Conservative	Bill Law	557	15%	−3.07%
Majority		107	3%	
Turnout		3611		
Liberal Democrats gain from Conservative		Swing		

=== Reddish North ===
Reddish North
Party	Candidate	Votes	%	±%
Labour	David Stephen Wilson*	2,082	66%	−3.39%
Conservative	Anthony Hannay	479	15%	+2.5%
BNP	Paul Bennett	419	13%	+1.74%
Liberal Democrats	Paul John Ankers	174	6%	−0.85%
Majority		1603	51%	−5.90%
Turnout		3154		
Labour hold		Swing		

=== Reddish South ===
Reddish South
Party	Candidate	Votes	%	±%
Labour	Tom Grundy*	1,948	60%	−10.22%
Conservative	Alex Fenton	561	17%	+3.50%
Green	Jess Northey	322	10%	N/A
BNP	Ged Williams	271	8%	+1.35%
Liberal Democrats	Louise Shaw	169	5%	−4.63%
Majority		1387	43%	−13.72
Turnout		3271		
Labour hold		Swing		

=== Stepping Hill ===
Stepping Hill
Party	Candidate	Votes	%	±%
Conservative	John Douglas Wright	1,316	33%	+6.76%
Liberal Democrats	Mark Edward Weldon*	1279	32%	−7.07%
Labour	Janet Mary Rothwell	1054	26%	+3.61%
Green	Ken Pease	381	9%	+2.88%
Majority		37	1%	
Turnout		4030		
Conservative gain from Liberal Democrats		Swing		

== Changes 2014–2015 ==
In October and November 2014, Labour lost three Stockport councillors, with Brian Hendley, Paul Moss, and Laura Booth all leaving the party. Hendley had been deselected without his knowing, Moss resigned due to house building on Reddish Vale Country Park, and Booth quit over allegations of a "culture of systematic bullying".

=== Bramhall South & Woodford ===
Bramhall South & Woodford by-election 20 November 2014
Party	Candidate	Votes	%	±%
Conservative	John McGahan	2,080	53.2	
Liberal Democrats	Jeremy Richard Meal	1,502	38.4	
Green	David James McDonough	197	5.0	
Labour	Kathryn Ann Priestley	132	3.4	
Majority		578	14.8	
Turnout		3,911	39.5	
Conservative hold		Swing		
