= Bramhall North =

Electoral division of Stockport, England

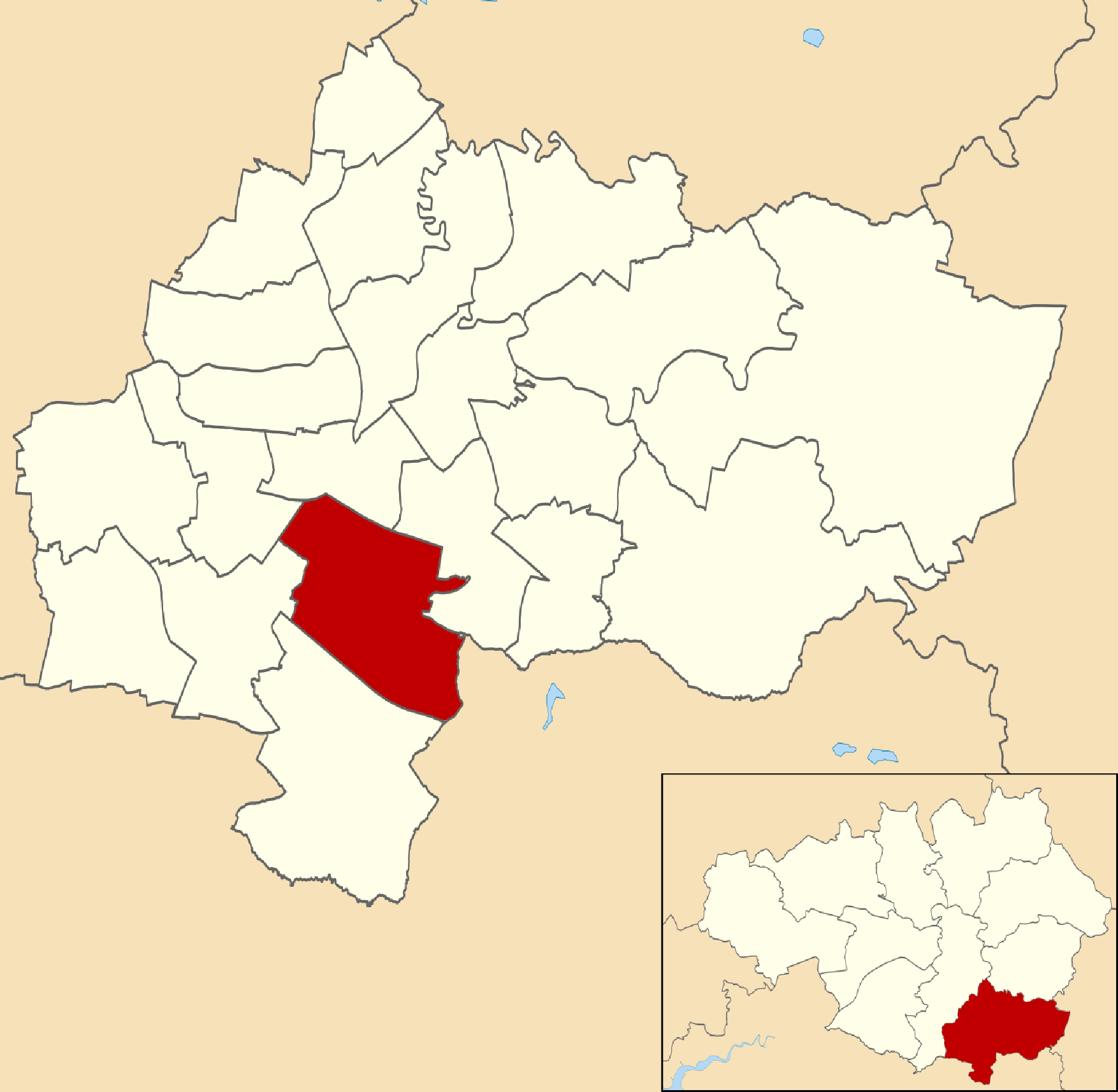
- Bramhall North within Stockport
- Population: 10,689 (2010)
- Country: England
- Sovereign state: United Kingdom
- UK Parliament: Cheadle
- Councillors: Mark Jones (Liberal Democrat); Suzanne Wyatt (Liberal Democrat); Alex Wynne (Liberal Democrat)

Bramhall North is an electoral ward in the Metropolitan Borough of Stockport. It elects three Councillors to Stockport Metropolitan Borough Council using the first past the post electoral method, electing one Councillor every year without election on the fourth.

It covers the northern part of Bramhall and includes Bramhall Station to the south of the ward. The ward contains Bramhall High School and four local primary schools.

Together with the Bramhall South, Cheadle and Gatley, Cheadle East & Cheadle Hulme North, Cheadle Hulme South, Heald Green and Norbury & Woodsmoor wards it makes up the Cheadle Parliamentary Constituency.

== Councillors ==
Bramhall North electoral ward is represented in Westminster by Tom Morrison MP for Cheadle.

The ward is represented on Stockport Council by three councillors: Mark Jones (Lib Dem), Suzanne Wyatt (Lib Dem), and Alex Wynne (Lib Dem).

Election	Councillor	Councillor	Councillor
2004	Maureen Walsh (Con)	Anthony Johnson (Con)	Ken Holt (Con)
2006	Maureen Walsh (Con)	Anthony Johnson (Con)	Ken Holt (Con)
2007	Maureen Walsh (Con)	Helen Foster-Grime (Lib Dem)	Ken Holt (Con)
2008	Maureen Walsh (Con)	Helen Foster-Grime (Lib Dem)	Linda Holt (Con)
January 2010	Maureen Walsh (Ind)	Helen Foster-Grime (Lib Dem)	Linda Holt (Con)
May 2010	Lisa Walker (Con)	Helen Foster-Grime (Lib Dem)	Linda Holt (Con)
2011	Lisa Walker (Con)	Alanna Vine (Con)	Linda Holt (Con)
2012	Lisa Walker (Con)	Alanna Vine (Con)	Linda Holt (Con)
2014	Lisa Walker (Con)	Alanna Vine (Con)	Linda Holt(Con)
2015	Lisa Walker (Con)	Alanna Vine (Con)	Linda Holt (Con)
2016	Lisa Walker (Con)	Alanna Vine (Con)	Linda Holt (Con)
2018	Lisa Walker (Con)	Alanna Vine (Con)	Linda Holt (Con)
2019	Lisa Walker (Con)	Alanna Vine (Con)	Linda Holt (Con)
2021	Lisa Walker (Con)	Alanna Vine (Con)	Linda Holt (Con)
May 2022	Frankie Singleton (Lib Dem)	Alanna Vine (Con)	Linda Holt (Con)
Jul 2022	Frankie Singleton (Lib Dem)	Alanna Vine (Ind)	Linda Holt (Con)
May 2023	Mark Jones (Lib Dem)	Suzanne Wyatt (Lib Dem)	Alex Wynne (Lib Dem)
May 2024	Mark Jones (Lib Dem)	Suzanne Wyatt (Lib Dem)	Alex Wynne (Lib Dem)

indicates seat up for re-election. indicates councillor defected or was suspended/expelled from their party.

Cllr Vine was elected as a Conservative but was suspended from the party on 13 July 2022 due to racist social media posts; she was subsequently expelled on 13 September 2022.

== Elections in 2020s ==
=== May 2024 ===
2024
Party	Candidate	Votes	%	±%
Liberal Democrats	Alex Wynne*	2,021	47.8	+7.5
Conservative	Linda Holt	1,534	36.2	−1.7
Labour	Mike Bennett	411	9.7	+2.4
Green	Deborah Hind	264	6.2	−4.7
Majority		487	11.6	
Turnout		4,265	43.7	−0.1
Registered electors		9,755		
Liberal Democrats hold		Swing		

=== May 2023 ===
2023
Party	Candidate	Votes	%
Liberal Democrats	Mark Jones	2,210	51.6
Liberal Democrats	Suzanne Wyatt	2,149	50.2
Liberal Democrats	Alex Wynne	1,728	40.3
Conservative	Fiona Bates	1,634	38.1
Conservative	Linda Holt	1,625	37.9
Conservative	Peter Crossen	1,503	35.1
Green	Deborah Hind	468	10.9
Labour	Jill Beswick	420	9.8
Labour	Mike Bennett	311	7.3
Labour	David Parkinson	252	5.9
Rejected ballots		13	
Turnout		4,285	43.8
Total votes		12,300	
Registered electors		9,792	
Liberal Democrats win (new seat)			
Liberal Democrats win (new seat)			
Liberal Democrats win (new seat)			

=== May 2022 ===
2022
Party	Candidate	Votes	%	±%
Liberal Democrats	Frankie Singleton	1,774	42.1	+10
Conservative	Lisa Walker*	1,734	41.1	−11
Labour	Terry Tallis	417	9.9	+1
Green	Deborah Hind	276	6.5	±0
Majority		40	1.0	
Rejected ballots		17	0.4	
Turnout		4,218	41.1	−6
Registered electors		10,253		
Liberal Democrats gain from Conservative		Swing		

=== May 2021 ===
2021
Party	Candidate	Votes	%	±%
Conservative	Linda Holt *	2,512	52	+5
Liberal Democrats	Mark Jones	1,529	32	−5
Labour	Abd-Assamad Mahmud	452	9	+1
Green	Deborah Hind	314	7	−
Majority		983		
Turnout		4838	47	
Registered electors		10,374		
Conservative hold		Swing		

== Elections in 2010s ==
=== May 2019 ===
2019
Party	Candidate	Votes	%	±%
Conservative	Alanna Vine*	1,943	47.47	−5.43
Liberal Democrats	Mark Jones	1,534	37.48	+7.17
Labour	Pauline Sheaff	329	8.04	−3.97
Green	Deborah Hind	287	7.01	+2.21
Majority		409	9.99	
Turnout		4,093	40	
Conservative hold		Swing		

=== May 2018 ===
2018
Party	Candidate	Votes	%	±%
Conservative	Linda Holt	2,269	52.90	
Liberal Democrats	Richard Flowers	1,300	30.31	
Labour	Janet Mobbs	515	12.01	
Green	Deborah Hind	206	4.80	
Majority		969		
Turnout		4,289	41	
Conservative hold		Swing		

=== May 2016 ===
2016
Party	Candidate	Votes	%	±%
Conservative	Linda Holt	2,400	53.17	
Liberal Democrats	Pauline Banham	1,177	26.07	
Labour	David Lee White	432	9.57	
UKIP	Joan Anne Wells	316	7.00	
Green	Deborah Evelyn Hind	189	4.19	
Majority		1,223		
Turnout		4,514	43	
Conservative hold		Swing		

=== May 2015 ===
2015
Party	Candidate	Votes	%	±%
Conservative	Alanna Vine	3,920	48.53	
Liberal Democrats	Helen Foster-Grime	2,551	31.58	
Labour	Elizabeth Marron	754	9.33	
UKIP	David Perry	515	6.38	
Green	Deborah Hind	338	4.18	
Majority		1,369		
Turnout		8,078	75	
Conservative hold		Swing		

=== May 2014 ===
2014
Party	Candidate	Votes	%	±%
Conservative	Lisa Walker*	2,185	49.74	−2.26
Liberal Democrats	Pauline Banham	1076	24.49	−11.86
UKIP	Ray Jones	594	13.52	N/A
Labour	Elizabeth Nicola Marron	538	12.25	+0.2
Majority		1109	26	+9.6
Turnout		4393		
Conservative hold		Swing		

=== May 2012 ===
2012
Party	Candidate	Votes	%	±%
Conservative	Linda Holt*	2,291	52.26	−4.01
Liberal Democrats	Helen Foster-Grime	1,572	35.86	−1.46
Labour	Brian Harrop	521	11.88	+9.30
Majority		719	16.40	
Turnout		4,413	41.36	
Conservative hold		Swing		

=== May 2011 ===
2011
Party	Candidate	Votes	%	±%
Conservative	Alanna Vine	2,799	49.2	+1.4
Liberal Democrats	Helen Foster-Grime*	2,261	39.8	−8.0
Labour	Brian Harrop	596	10.5	+4.0
Majority		538		
Turnout		5,687	53.18	
Conservative gain from Liberal Democrats		Swing		

=== May 2010 ===
2010
Party	Candidate	Votes	%	±%
Conservative	Lisa Walker	3,764	47.8	−8.5
Liberal Democrats	Pauline Banham	3763	47.8	+10.5
Labour	Brian Harrop	521	6.5	+2.9
Majority		1	0.0001	−19
Turnout		7898	73.9	
Conservative gain from Independent		Swing		

Note: The electoral result after many recounts was a tie between Lisa Walker and Pauline Banham, as a result ballots were drawn for the winner of which Lisa Walker then scored one vote higher than Pauline Banham.

== Elections in the 2000s ==
=== May 2008 ===
Bramhall North ward candidates
Party	Candidate	Votes	%	±%
Conservative	Linda Holt	3,043	56.3	
Liberal Democrats	John Ellis	2,018	37.3	
Labour	Kathryn Priestley	140	2.6	
BNP	David Gordon	123	2.3	
UKIP	Malcolm Crossley	84	1.6	
Majority		1,025	19.0	
Conservative hold		Swing		

=== May 2007 ===
Bramhall North ward
Party	Candidate	Votes	%	±%
Liberal Democrats	Foster-Grime, H.	2525	47.5	
Conservative	McCarron, R.B.	2457	46.3	
BNP	Gordon, D.R.	186	3.5	
Labour	Priestly, K.A.	143	2.7	
Majority		68	1.3	
Rejected ballots		10	0.2	
Turnout		5321	50.7	
Liberal Democrats gain from Conservative		Swing		
