= Bramhall South and Woodford =

Electoral division of Stockport, England

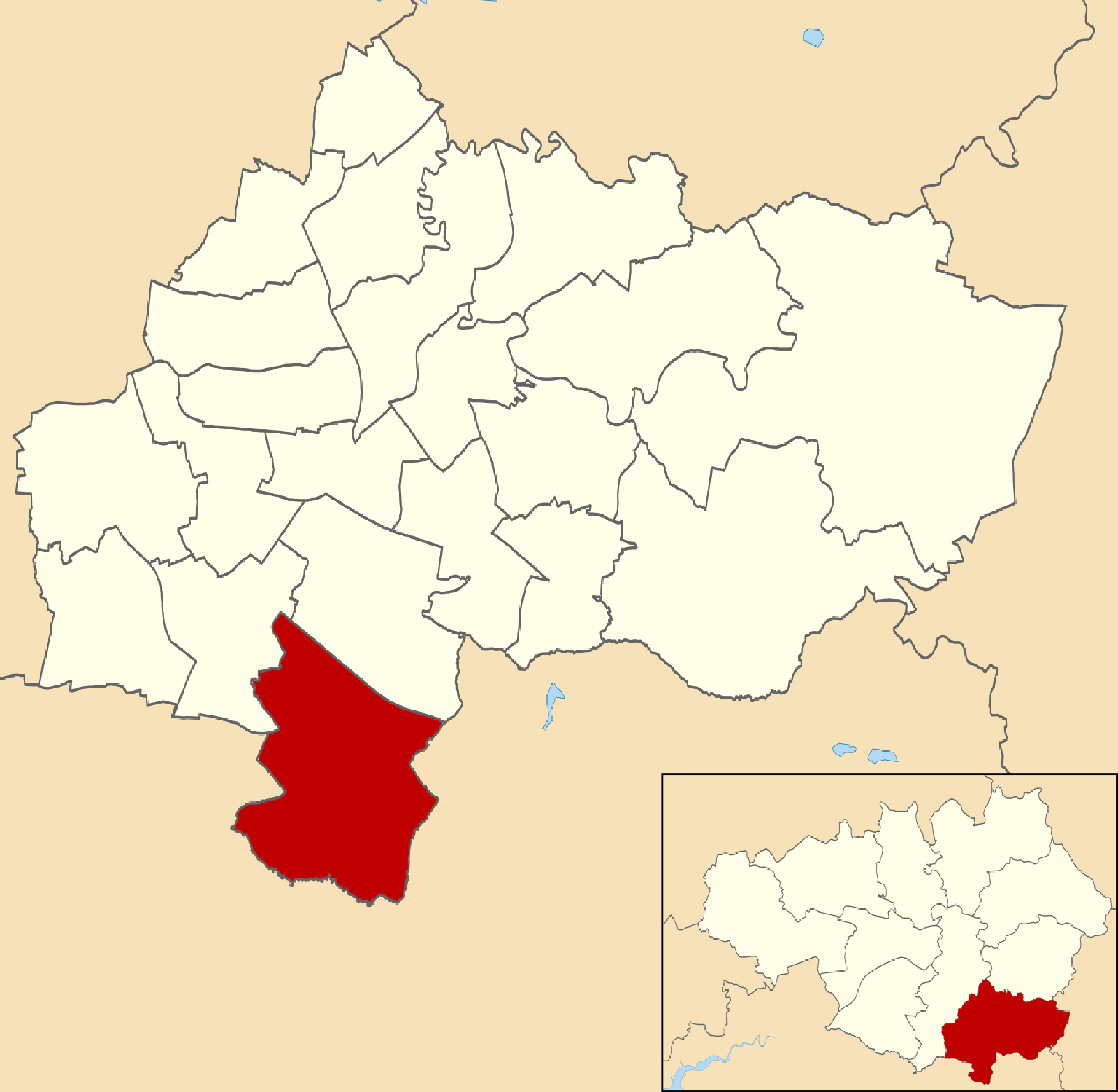
- Bramhall South and Woodford within Stockport
- Population: 12,507 (2020)
- Country: England
- Sovereign state: United Kingdom
- UK Parliament: Cheadle
- Councillors: Peter Crossen (Conservative); Dallas Jones (Liberal Democrat); Jeremy Meal (Liberal Democrat)

Bramhall South and Woodford is an electoral ward in the Metropolitan Borough of Stockport. It elects three councillors to Stockport Metropolitan Borough Council using the first-past-the-post electoral method, electing one councillor every year without election on the fourth.

The ward was created in 2004, from parts of the former wards of West Bramhall and Cheadle Hulme South. It covers the southern part of Bramhall and the village of Woodford. The ward contains the main village centre of Bramhall. To the south of the ward is Wilmslow and Handforth Dean.

Together with Bramhall North, Cheadle and Gatley, Cheadle Hulme North, Cheadle Hulme South, Heald Green and Stepping Hill wards it makes up the Cheadle Parliamentary Constituency.

In January 2015, it became home to the first ever UKIP representative to hold a political position in Stockport when Paul Bellis joined the party following his exit from the Conservatives. However, he failed to defend his seat from Conservative Party candidate Mike Hurleston in the subsequent election. Following the May 2022 local elections, Liberal Democrat councillor Ian Powney became the first non-Conservative representative to be elected by the ward.

== Councillors ==
Bramhall South electoral ward is represented in Westminster by Mary Robinson MP for Cheadle.

The ward is represented on Stockport Council by three councillors: Peter Crossen (Conservative), Dallas Jones (Lib Dem), and Jeremy Meal (Lib Dem).

Election	Councillor	Councillor	Councillor
2004	John Leck (Con)	Paul Bellis (Con)	Brian Bagnall (Con)
2006	John Leck (Con)	Paul Bellis (Con)	Brian Bagnall (Con)
2007	John Leck (Con)	Paul Bellis (Con)	Brian Bagnall (Con)
2008	John Leck (Con)	Paul Bellis (Con)	Brian Bagnall (Con)
2010	John Leck (Con)	Paul Bellis (Con)	Brian Bagnall (Con)
2011	John Leck (Con)	Paul Bellis (Con)	Brian Bagnall (Con)
2012	John Leck (Con)	Paul Bellis (Con)	Brian Bagnall (Con)
May 2014	Anita Johnson (Con)	Paul Bellis (Con)	Brian Bagnall (Con)
By-election; 20 November 2014	John McGahan (Con)	Paul Bellis (Con)	Brian Bagnall (Con)
January 2015	John McGahan (Con)	Paul Bellis (UKIP)	Brian Bagnall (Con)
May 2015	John McGahan (Con)	Mike Hurleston (Con)	Brian Bagnall (Con)
2016	John McGahan (Con)	Mike Hurleston (Con)	Brian Bagnall (Con)
2018	John McGahan (Con)	Mike Hurleston (Con)	Brian Bagnall (Con)
2019	John McGahan (Con)	Mike Hurleston (Con)	Brian Bagnall (Con)
2021	John McGahan (Con)	Mike Hurleston (Con)	Brian Bagnall (Con)
2022	Ian Powney (Lib Dem)	Mike Hurleston (Con)	Brian Bagnall (Con)
2023	Ian Powney (Lib Dem)	Dallas Jones (Lib Dem)	Jeremy Meal (Lib Dem)
2024	Ian Powney (Lib Dem)	Dallas Jones (Lib Dem)	Jeremy Meal (Lib Dem)
By-election; 31 October 2024	Peter Crossen (Con)	Dallas Jones (Lib Dem)	Jeremy Meal (Lib Dem)
2026	Peter Crossen (Con)	Dallas Jones (Lib Dem)	Jeremy Meal (Lib Dem)

indicates seat up for re-election. indicates seat won in by-election. indicates councillor defected.

== Elections in 2020s ==
=== May 2026 ===
2026
Party	Candidate	Votes	%	±%
Liberal Democrats	Dallas Jones	2,417	41	−3
Conservative	Ste Mulvenna	2114	36	−12
Reform	Stephen Speakman	776	13	+10
Green	Thomas Price	393	7	+5
Labour	Phil Matley	134	2	−1
Majority		303	5	+1
Turnout		5834	54	+17
Liberal Democrats hold		Swing	+4.5	

=== October 2024 (by-election) ===
By-election 31 October 2024
Party	Candidate	Votes	%	±%
Conservative	Peter Crossen	1,909	48	+5
Liberal Democrats	Sandeep Singh Kashyap	1733	44	−1
Reform	John Howard Kelly	133	3	N/A
Labour	Jake Stewart Thomas	115	3	−4
Green	Andrew James Dearden	95	2	−3
Majority		176	4	+2
Turnout		3985	37	−10
Conservative gain from Liberal Democrats		Swing	+3	

The by-election occurred due to the resignation of the incumbent Liberal Democrat candidate Ian Powney.

=== May 2024 ===
2024
Party	Candidate	Votes	%	±%
Liberal Democrats	Jeremy Richard Meal	2,185	45	
Conservative	Peter Crossen	2,104	43	
Labour	Sandy Broadhurst	344	7	
Green	Andrew James Dearden	231	5	
Majority		81	2	
Turnout		4,864	47	
Liberal Democrats hold		Swing		

=== May 2023 ===
2023
Party	Candidate	Votes	%	±%
Liberal Democrats	Ian George Powney	2,342	17	
Liberal Democrats	Dallas Ann Jones	2,228	16	
Liberal Democrats	Jeremy Richard Meal	2,188	16	
Conservative	Brian Bagnall	2,025	15	
Conservative	Mike Hurleston	1,828	14	
Conservative	John McGahan	1,789	13	
Green	Andrew James Dearden	437	3	
Labour	Vince Martin	254	2	
Labour	Karen Szkilnyk	230	2	
Labour	Chris Wells	207	2	
Majority				
Turnout				
Liberal Democrats gain from Conservative		Swing		

=== May 2022 ===
2022
Party	Candidate	Votes	%	±%
Liberal Democrats	Ian George Powney	2,361	49	+9
Conservative	John McGahan	2,038	42	−6
Labour	Yvonne Maureen Guariento	288	6	−1
Green	Andrew James Dearden	177	4	−1
Majority		323	7	−1
Turnout		4,864	48	−4
Liberal Democrats gain from Conservative		Swing	+7.5	

=== May 2021 ===
2021
Party	Candidate	Votes	%	±%
Conservative	Brian Bagnall	2,535	48	+3
Liberal Democrats	Ian George Powney	2,136	40	−1
Labour	Sue Glithero	355	7	+1
Green	Andrew James Dearden	255	5	−3
Majority		399	8	+4
Turnout		5,281	52	+9
Conservative hold		Swing	+2	

== Elections in 2010s ==
=== May 2019 ===
2019
Party	Candidate	Votes	%	±%
Conservative	Mike Hurleston	1,905	45	−8
Liberal Democrats	Jeremy Meal	1,711	41	+5
Green	Charlotte Amy May	341	8	+5
Labour	Colin Owen	245	6	−2
Majority		194	4	−13
Turnout		4,202	43	−3
Conservative hold		Swing	-6.5	

=== May 2018 ===
2018
Party	Candidate	Votes	%	±%
Conservative	John McGahan	2,354	53	+9
Liberal Democrats	Jeremy Meal	1,598	36	+1
Labour	Khalid Ahmed	340	8	+2
Green	Malcolm Brown	113	3	0
UKIP	David Perry	52	1	−4
Majority		756	17	+10
Turnout		4,457	46	−1
Conservative hold		Swing	+4	

=== May 2016 ===
2016
Party	Candidate	Votes	%	±%
Conservative	Brian Bagnall	1,972	44	−2
Liberal Democrats	Jeremy Richard Meal	1,657	37	+4
Labour	Philip Stanley Matley	260	6	−1
Independent	Paul Bellis	248	6	N/A
UKIP	David Perry	236	5	−5
Green	Malcolm Brown	127	3	−1
Majority		315	7	−6
Turnout		4,500	47	−32
Conservative hold		Swing	-3	

=== May 2015 ===
2015
Party	Candidate	Votes	%	±%
Conservative	Mike Hurleston	3,598	46	−7
Liberal Democrats	Jeremy Meal	2,579	33	−5
UKIP	Paul Bellis	779	10	N/A
Labour	Beryl Dykes	572	7	+4
Green	Nicole Spring	281	4	−1
Majority		1,019	13	−2
Turnout		7,809	79	+39
Conservative gain from UKIP		Swing	-1	

=== November 2014 (by-election) ===
By-election 20 November 2014
Party	Candidate	Votes	%	±%
Conservative	John McGahan	2,080	53	+8
Liberal Democrats	Jeremy Richard Meal	1502	38	+5
Green	David James McDonough	197	5	N/A
Labour	Kathryn Ann Priestley	132	3	−6
Majority		578	15	+3
Turnout		3911	40	−3
Conservative hold		Swing	+1.5	

The by-election occurred due to the resignation of the incumbent Conservative Party candidate Anita Johnston due to ill health.

=== May 2014 ===
2014
Party	Candidate	Votes	%	±%
Conservative	Anita Johnson	1,862	45	−4
Liberal Democrats	Jeremy Richard Meal	1373	33	+6
UKIP	David Michael Perry	538	13	+4
Labour	Ruth Kaiser	369	9	−1
Majority		489	12	−11
Turnout		4142	43	+3.8
Conservative hold		Swing	-5	

=== May 2012 ===
2012
Party	Candidate	Votes	%	±%
Conservative	Brian Bagnall	1,900	49	−5
Liberal Democrats	Pauline Banham	1,007	26	−3
Labour	Beryl Dykes	389	10	+1
UKIP	David Perry	342	9	+5
Green	Ross White	202	5	+2
Majority		893	23	−2
Turnout		3,840	39.2	−12.8
Conservative hold		Swing	-1	

=== May 2011 ===
2011
Party	Candidate	Votes	%	±%
Conservative	Paul Bellis	2,791	54	+5
Liberal Democrats	Paul Carter	1,489	29	−12
Labour	Beryl Dykes	480	9	+4
UKIP	David Perry	213	4	−1
Green	Ross White	176	3	+1
Majority		1,302	25	+17
Turnout		5,149	52	
Conservative hold		Swing	+8.5	

=== May 2010 ===
2010
Party	Candidate	Votes	%	±%
Conservative	John Leck	3,775	49	−10
Liberal Democrats	Paul Carter	3,195	41	+8
Labour	Beryl Dykes	387	5	+1
UKIP	David Perry	213	3	−1
Green	Ross White	173	2	N/A
Majority		580	8	−18
Turnout		7,743		
Conservative hold		Swing	-9	

== Elections in the 2000s ==
=== May 2008 ===
2008
Party	Candidate	Votes	%	±%
Conservative	Brian Bagnall	2,762	59	+3
Liberal Democrats	Keith Holloway	1,554	33	−1
Labour	Beryl Dykes	170	4	+1
UKIP	David Perry	163	4	+1
Majority		1,208	26	−4
Turnout		4,649		
Conservative hold		Swing	+2	

=== May 2007 ===
2007
Party	Candidate	Votes	%	±%
Conservative	Paul Bellis	2,713	56	+3
Liberal Democrats	Lenny Grice	1,787	37	−4
UKIP	David Perry	155	3	0
Labour	Beryl Dykes	151	3	0
Majority		926	22	+10
Turnout		4,806		
Conservative hold		Swing	+3.5	

=== May 2006 ===
2006
Party	Candidate	Votes	%	±%
Conservative	John Leck	2,606	53	
Liberal Democrats	Lenny Grice	2,044	41	
UKIP	David Perry	146	3	
Labour	Beryl Dykes	142	3	
Majority		562	12	
Turnout		4,938		
Conservative hold		Swing		

=== May 2004 ===
2004
Party	Candidate	Votes	%	±%
Conservative	Brian Bagnall	2,673	16	
Conservative	Paul Bellis	2,656	16	
Conservative	John Leck	2,620	16	
Liberal Democrats	Paul Carter	2,507	15	
Liberal Democrats	T. Healy	2,418	15	
Liberal Democrats	J.D. Rule	2,085	13	
UKIP	David Perry	491	3	
Labour	A.P. Graystone	396	2	
Labour	G.M. Scott	270	2	
Labour	Brian James Russell	259	2	
Majority				
Turnout				
Conservative win (new seat)				
