= 2004 Stockport Metropolitan Borough Council election =

2004 local election in England

Stockport Council Election 2004
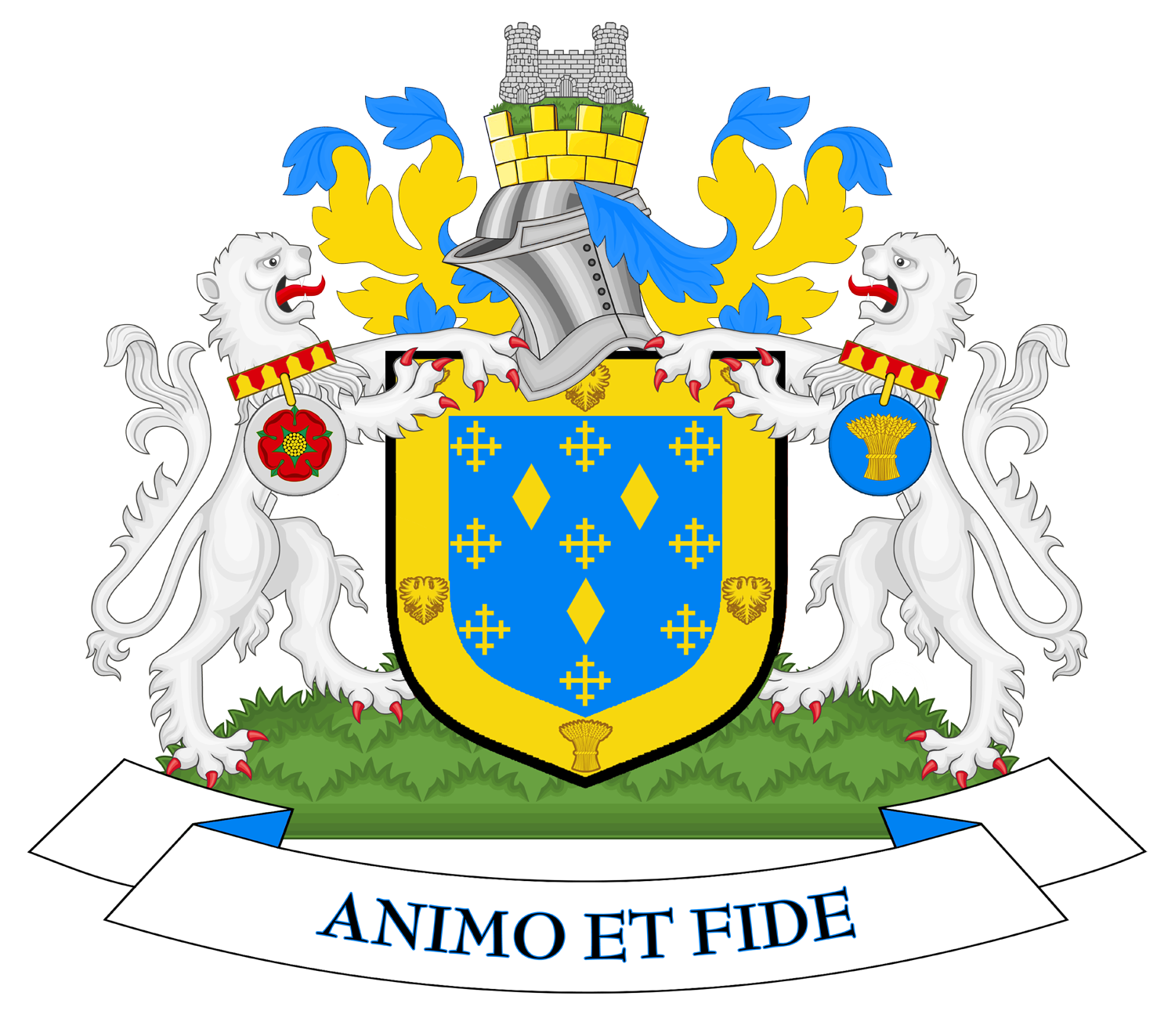
- 10 June 2004

21 Seats up for Election
	First party	Second party
Party	Liberal Democrats	Labour
Seats before	34	17
Seats won	35	14
Seats after	35	14
Seat change	▲1	▼3
	Third party	Fourth party
Party	Conservative	Heald Green Ratepayers
Seats before	9	3
Seats won	10	3
Seats after	10	3
Seat change	▲1	Steady
- Map showing the results of the 2004 Stockport Metropolitan Borough Council elections by ward. Red shows Labour seats, blue shows the Conservatives, yellow shows the Liberal Democrats and green the Heald Green Ratepayers.

The 2004 Stockport Metropolitan Borough Council election took place on 10 June 2004 to elect members of Stockport Metropolitan Borough Council in England. This was on the same day as other local elections. Due to demographic changes in the Borough since its formation in 1973, and in common with most other English Councils in 2004, boundary changes were implemented in time for these elections. Due to these changes, it was necessary for the whole Council to be re-elected for the first time since 1973. The Liberal Democrats held overall control of the council.

Party	Seats	% votes
Liberal Democrats	35	
Labour	14	
Conservative	10	
Heald Green Ratepayers	3	
Independent	1	

== Ward results ==
=== Bramhall North ===
Bramhall North
Party	Candidate	Votes	%	±%
Conservative	Ken Holt*	2,892	52.2	
Conservative	Anthony Johnson*	2,777		
Conservative	Maureen Walsh*	2,588		
Liberal Democrats	L. Grice	2,333	42.1	
Liberal Democrats	A. Smith	2,294		
Liberal Democrats	J. Davnall	2,173		
Labour	D. Heywood	310	5.6	
Labour	J. Owen	284		
Labour	M. Rowles-Arden	266		
Majority				
Turnout			52.5	

=== Bramhall South ===
Bramhall South
Party	Candidate	Votes	%	±%
Conservative	Brian Bagnall*	2,673	44.1	
Conservative	Paul Bellis*	2,656		
Conservative	J. Leck	2,620		
Liberal Democrats	P. Carter	2,507	41.3	
Liberal Democrats	T. Healy	2,418		
Liberal Democrats	J. Rule	2,085		
UKIP	D. Perry	491	8.1	
Labour	A. Graystone	396	6.5	
Labour	G. Scott	270		
Labour	B. Russell	259		
Majority				
Turnout			58.5	

=== Bredbury and Woodley ===
Bredbury and Woodley
Party	Candidate	Votes	%	±%
Liberal Democrats	D. Humphries	2,916	63.9	
Liberal Democrats	Michael Wilson*	2,648		
Liberal Democrats	Chris Gordon*	2,582		
Conservative	A. Gibbons	948	20.8	
Conservative	C. Hickson	754		
Labour	A. Salt	702	15.4	
Labour	D. Bottomley	580		
Labour	B. Huges	519		
Majority				
Turnout			41.1	

=== Bredbury Green and Romiley ===
Bredbury Green and Romiley
Party	Candidate	Votes	%	±%
Liberal Democrats	Hazel Lees*	2,646	63.9	
Liberal Democrats	Margaret McLay*	2,357		
Liberal Democrats	B. Jones	1,922		
Conservative	K. Gibbons	1,261	26.5	
Conservative	G. Jones	1,235		
Conservative	W. Law	1,093		
Labour	P. Bray	847	17.8	
Labour	C. Hughes	730		
Labour	T. Pemberton	653		
Majority				
Turnout			41.8	

=== Brinnington and Central ===
Brinnington and Central
Party	Candidate	Votes	%	±%
Labour	Maureen Rowles*	1,559	55.9	
Labour	Chris Murphy*	1,370		
Labour	Colin MacAlister*	1,322		
Liberal Democrats	C. Walker	651	23.3	
Liberal Democrats	D. White	569		
Liberal Democrats	J. White	497		
Conservative	C. Holgate	362	13.0	
Conservative	A. Sidderley	355		
Conservative	T. Earley	350		
Socialist (GB)	J. Pearson	218	7.8	
Majority				
Turnout			26.8	

=== Cheadle and Gatley ===
Cheadle and Gatley
Party	Candidate	Votes	%	±%
Liberal Democrats	Paul Carter	2,533	46.0	
Liberal Democrats	Pam King	2,449		
Liberal Democrats	Brian Millard	2,353		
Conservative	L. Livesley	2,296	41.7	
Conservative	I. Roberts	2,131		
Conservative	S. Speakman	2,002		
Labour	C. Owen	676	12.3	
Labour	P. Jackson	672		
Labour	A. Kellett	633		
Majority				
Turnout			48.2	

=== Cheadle Hulme North ===
Cheadle Hulme North
Party	Candidate	Votes	%	±%
Liberal Democrats	John Pantall*	2,223	53.3	
Liberal Democrats	Paul Porgess*	2,028		
Liberal Democrats	June Somekh*	1,876		
Conservative	J. Creed	1,400	33.6	
Conservative	R. Radmore	1,278		
Conservative	P. Leck	1,209		
Labour	P. Dykes	547	13.1	
Green	D. Leaver	476	11.4	
Labour	M. Pollard	408		
Labour	E. Pollard	404		
Majority				
Turnout			42.7	

=== Cheadle Hulme South ===
Cheadle Hulme South
Party	Candidate	Votes	%	±%
Liberal Democrats	L. Shaw*	2,689	53.4	
Liberal Democrats	Suzanne Wyatt	2,437		
Liberal Democrats	Stuart Bodsworth*	2,327		
Conservative	J. Kitson	1,808	35.9	
Conservative	D. Lawson	1,648		
Conservative	M. White	1,613		
Labour	J. Miller	537	10.7	
Labour	F. McGee	361		
Labour	S. Rowles	352		
Majority				
Turnout			47.5	

=== Davenport and Cale Green ===
Davenport and Cale Green
Party	Candidate	Votes	%	±%
Liberal Democrats	J. Abrams	1,747	48.0	
Liberal Democrats	Roy Driver	1,730		
Liberal Democrats	David White	1,685		
Labour	T. McGee	1,351	37.2	
Labour	J. McGuire	1,277		
Labour	M. Miller	1,250		
Conservative	B. Charlesworth	538	14.8	
Conservative	M. Jackson	523		
Conservative	C. Garner	521		
Majority				
Turnout			34.6	

=== Edgeley and Cheadle Heath ===
Edgeley and Cheadle Heath
Party	Candidate	Votes	%	±%
Labour	Sheila Bailey*	2,098	53.8	
Labour	Richard Coaton	2,021		
Labour	Philip Harding*	1,794		
Liberal Democrats	W. Littlehales	853	21.9	
Liberal Democrats	M. Nuttall	835		
Liberal Democrats	A. Stewart	765		
Conservative	S. Holgate	565	14.5	
Conservative	A. Snape	542		
Conservative	M. O'Neill	533		
BNP	R. Chadfield	385	9.9	
Majority				
Turnout			35.0	

=== Hazel Grove ===
Hazel Grove
Party	Candidate	Votes	%	±%
Liberal Democrats	Kevin Hogg	2,844	53.1	
Liberal Democrats	Christine Corris	2,835		
Liberal Democrats	Stuart Corris	2,781		
Conservative	J. Lewis-Booth	1,919	35.8	
Conservative	K. Labrey	1,904		
Conservative	N. Menzies	1,709		
Labour	Y. Bradley	592	11.1	
Labour	J. Steven	439		
Labour	A. Verdeille	395		
Majority				
Turnout			48.9	

=== Heald Green ===
Heald Green
Party	Candidate	Votes	%	±%
Heald Green Ratepayers	Peter Burns*	3,216	67.1	
Heald Green Ratepayers	Eileen Sylvia Humphries*	3,059		
Heald Green Ratepayers	Derek Whitehead*	3,046		
Liberal Democrats	H. Thompson	658	13.7	
Liberal Democrats	P. Buttle	617		
Liberal Democrats	K. Holloway	612		
Conservative	C. Davenport	489	10.2	
Conservative	R. Stevenson	464		
Conservative	D. Khan	462		
Labour	K. Priestley	431	9.0	
Labour	A. Sutherland	316		
Labour	M. Thompson	308		
Majority				
Turnout			45.8	

=== Heatons North ===
Heatons North
Party	Candidate	Votes	%	±%
Conservative	Les Jones*	3,103	46.5	
Conservative	Jackie Jones*	2,085		
Conservative	Anthony O'Neill*	2,080		
Labour	R. Berry	1,312	19.7	
Labour	J. Humphries	1,165		
Labour	I. Fenwick	1,146		
Liberal Democrats	J. Langrish	1,008	15.1	
Liberal Democrats	D. Craufurd	903		
Liberal Democrats	D. Thame	797		
Green	J. Cuff	678	10.2	
UKIP	G. Price	567	8.5	
Majority				
Turnout			45.8	

=== Heatons South ===
Heatons South
Party	Candidate	Votes	%	±%
Labour	Colin Foster*	2,077	34.7	
Labour	Lesley Auger*	1,989		
Conservative	David Foulkes*	1,788	29.9	
Conservative	B. Lees*	1,748		
Conservative	M. Lord	1,622		
Labour	M. Junejo	1,499		
Liberal Democrats	R. Axtell	1,109	18.5	
Green	A. Hardman	1,007	16.8	
Liberal Democrats	P. Jackson	822		
Majority				
Turnout			45.9	

=== Manor ===
Manor
Party	Candidate	Votes	%	±%
Liberal Democrats	Sue Derbyshire*	1,879	41.4	
Liberal Democrats	Jenny Humphreys*	1,787		
Liberal Democrats	David Robert-Jones	1,558		
Labour	B. Lechner	1,461	32.2	
Labour	M. Duerdoth	926		
Labour	Howard Dawber	901		
BNP	D. Warner	672	14.8	
Conservative	B. Charlesworth	530	11.7	
Conservative	A. Daly	497		
Conservative	M. Mason	487		
Majority				
Turnout			37.1	

=== Marple North ===
Marple North
Party	Candidate	Votes	%	±%
Liberal Democrats	Martin Candler*	2,808	53.8	
Liberal Democrats	Andrew Bispham*	2,454		
Liberal Democrats	Mark Hunter*	2,344		
Conservative	A. Hickson	1,424	27.3	
Conservative	B. Hopwood	1,407		
Conservative	N. Lewis-Booth	1,348		
Green	M. Preston	611	11.7	
Labour	S. Townsend	380	7.3	
Labour	D. Rowbottom	337		
Labour	D. Woodman	318		
Majority				
Turnout			51.5	

=== Marple South ===
Marple South
Party	Candidate	Votes	%	±%
Liberal Democrats	Shan Alexander	2,458	46.0	
Liberal Democrats	Chris Baker*	2,276		
Liberal Democrats	Roy Weaver	2,273		
Conservative	H. Haley	1,924	36.0	
Conservative	W. Morley-Scott	1,878		
Conservative	G. Cameron	1,774		
Green	G. Reid	560	10.5	
Labour	W. Sewell	397	7.4	
Labour	M. Brett	292		
Labour	F. Ogden	284		
Majority				
Turnout			50.2	

=== Offerton ===
Offerton
Party	Candidate	Votes	%	±%
Liberal Democrats	Dave Goddard*	1,806	44.8	
Liberal Democrats	Wendy Meikle	1,773		
Independent	T. Pyle	1,547	38.4	
Liberal Democrats	P. Beatty*	1,542		
Independent	K. Southwick	1,361		
Independent	S. Ryan	1,320		
Labour	S. Ball	679	16.8	
Labour	A. Trafford	458		
Labour	D. Trafford	420		
Majority				
Turnout			37.9	

=== Reddish North ===
Reddish North
Party	Candidate	Votes	%	±%
Labour	Anne Graham*	1,859	57.9	
Labour	David Owen*	1,780		
Labour	Peter Scott*	1,720		
Conservative	A. Hannay	820	25.5	
Conservative	J. Whelan	769		
Conservative	N. Peacock	755		
Liberal Democrats	M. Lees	534	16.6	
Liberal Democrats	M. Gordon	533		
Liberal Democrats	R. Willocks	510		
Majority				
Turnout			31.7	

=== Reddish South ===
Reddish South
Party	Candidate	Votes	%	±%
Labour	J. Kidd*	1,897	49.9	
Labour	Walter Brett*	1,875		
Labour	Tom Grundy*	1,869		
Conservative	E. Berridge	1,071	28.2	
Liberal Democrats	S. Duncan	830	21.9	
Liberal Democrats	B. Fairbanks	691		
Liberal Democrats	R. Stephenson	660		
Majority				
Turnout			35.0	

=== Stepping Hill ===
Stepping Hill
Party	Candidate	Votes	%	±%
Liberal Democrats	Maggie Clay	2,195	37.7	
Liberal Democrats	Ben Alexander	1,969		
Liberal Democrats	Mark Weldon	1,895		
Conservative	G. Berry	1,451	24.9	
Conservative	B. Haley	1,447		
Conservative	J. Lowery	1,350		
Labour	G. Smith	733	12.6	
Labour	S. Moran	700		
Labour	D. Wilson	586		
UKIP	A. Moore	563	9.7	
Green	D. Bagshaw	486	8.3	
BNP	D. Gordon	395	6.8	
Majority				
Turnout			48.9	
