= 2019 Stockport Metropolitan Borough Council election =

2019 local election in England

Stockport Metropolitan Council Election 2019
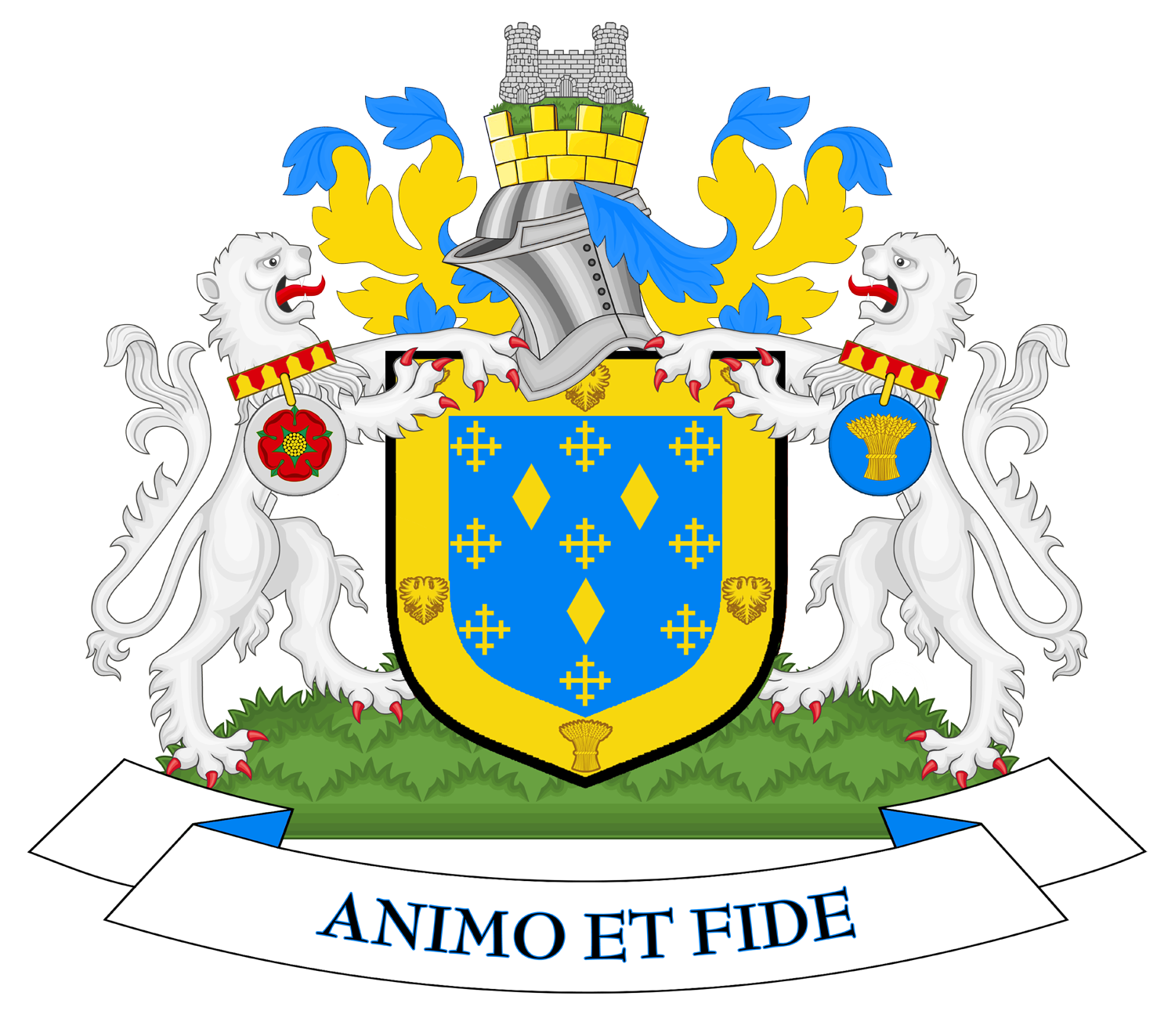
- 2 May 2019

21 Seats up for Election
	First party	Second party
Leader	Elise Wilson	Mark Hunter
Party	Labour	Liberal Democrats
Leader's seat	Davenport and Cale Green	Cheadle Hulme South
Seats before	23	21
Seats won	8	10
Seats after	26	26
Seat change	▲3	▲5
Popular vote	20,612	25,627
Percentage	27.8%	34.6%
	Third party	Fourth party
Leader	Syd Lloyd (retiring)	Adrian Nottingham
Party	Conservative	Heald Green Ratepayers
Leader's seat	Bramhall and Woodford	Heald Green
Seats before	12	3
Seats won	2	1
Seats after	8	3
Seat change	▼4	Steady
Popular vote	15,142	2,393
Percentage	20.4%	3.2%
- Map showing the results of the 2019 Stockport Metropolitan Borough Council elections by ward. Red shows Labour seats, blue shows the Conservatives, yellow shows the Liberal Democrats and green the Heald Green Ratepayers.
Leader of the Council before election
Alex Ganotis
Labour
Leader of the Council
Elise Wilson
Labour

The 2019 Stockport Metropolitan Borough Council election took place on 2 May 2019 to elect members of Stockport Metropolitan Borough Council in England. This was on the same day as other local elections. Stockport Council is elected in thirds, which means that in each three member local ward, one councillor is elected every year, except every four years which is classed as a fallow year. The last fallow year was 2017, when no local government elections took place in the borough. Those councillors elected in 2019 will serve a four-year term, expiring in 2023.

Despite Labour drawing level on seats with the Liberal Democrats, with both parties holding 26 councillors, the Labour minority administration continued in office.

== Results summary ==
2019 Stockport Metropolitan Borough Council election
Party	This election				Full council			This election		
Party	Candidates	Seats	Net	Seats %	Other	Total	Total %	Votes	Votes %	+/−
Liberal Democrats	{{{candidates}}}	10	▲5	47.6	16	26	41.3	25,627	34.55	▲2.85
Labour	{{{candidates}}}	8	▲1	38.1	18	26	41.3	20,612	27.79	▼5.71
Conservative	{{{candidates}}}	2	▼4	9.5	6	8	12.7	15,142	20.41	▼6.89
Heald Green Ratepayers	{{{candidates}}}	1	Steady	4.8	2	3	4.8	2,393	3.23	▲0.63
Green	{{{candidates}}}	0	Steady	0.0	0	0	0.0	6,867	9.26	
UKIP	{{{candidates}}}	0	Steady	0.0	0	0	0.0	1,948	2.63	
Independent	{{{candidates}}}	0	▼2	0.0	0	0	0.0	1,030	1.39	
Foundation Party	{{{candidates}}}	0	Steady	0.0	0	0	0.0	203	0.27	
Women's Equality	{{{candidates}}}	0	Steady	0.0	0	0	0.0	188	0.25	
End Austerity	{{{candidates}}}	0	Steady	0.0	0	0	0.0	164	0.22	

== Election results by ward ==
Asterisk (*) indicates incumbent in the Ward, and Bold names highlight winning candidate.

=== Bramhall North ===
Bramhall North
Party	Candidate	Votes	%	±%
Conservative	Alanna Vine*	1,943	47.47	−5.43
Liberal Democrats	Mark Jones	1,534	37.48	+7.17
Labour	Pauline Sheaff	329	8.04	−3.97
Green	Deborah Hind	287	7.01	+2.21
Majority		409	9.99	
Turnout		4,093	40	
Conservative hold		Swing		

=== Bramhall South and Woodford ===
Bramhall South and Woodford
Party	Candidate	Votes	%	±%
Conservative	Mike Hurleston*	1,905	45	−8
Liberal Democrats	Jeremy Meal	1,711	41	+5
Green	Charlotte May	341	8	+5
Labour	Colin Owen	245	6	−2
Majority		194	4	
Turnout		4,202	43	
Conservative hold		Swing		

=== Bredbury and Woodley ===
Bredbury and Woodley
Party	Candidate	Votes	%	±%
Liberal Democrats	Stuart Corris*	1,608	53	−1
Labour	Holly McCormack	470	15	−4
Conservative	Susan Howard	403	13	−8
UKIP	Vernon Bailey	396	13	N/A
Green	Conrad Beard	185	6	+1
Majority		1,138	38	
Turnout		3,062	29	
Liberal Democrats hold		Swing		

=== Bredbury Green and Romiley ===
Bredbury Green and Romiley
Party	Candidate	Votes	%	±%
Liberal Democrats	Mark Roberts	2,123	60	+9
Conservative	Sally Bennett	710	20	−9
Labour	Peter Black	480	13	−3
Green	Camilla Luff	248	7	+3
Majority		1,413	40	
Turnout		3,613	33	
Liberal Democrats gain from Conservative		Swing		

=== Brinnington and Central ===
Brinnington and Central
Party	Candidate	Votes	%	±%
Labour	Kerry Waters	1,248	60	−18
Green	Karl Wardlaw	272	13	N/A
Conservative	Ros Lloyd	215	10	−5
Liberal Democrats	Geoff Abell	183	9	+2
End Austerity	John Pearson	164	8	N/A
Majority		976	47	
Turnout		2,082	20	
Labour hold		Swing		

=== Cheadle and Gatley ===
Cheadle and Gatley
Party	Candidate	Votes	%	±%
Liberal Democrats	Graham Greenhalgh*	2,088	49	+2
Conservative	Mark Williams	1,037	24	−5
Labour	Khalid Ahmed	829	19	−3
Green	Praveen Kutty	316	7	+5
Majority		1,051	25	
Turnout		4,270	36	
Liberal Democrats hold		Swing		

=== Cheadle Hulme North ===
Cheadle Hulme North
Party	Candidate	Votes	%	±%
Liberal Democrats	Tom Morrison	2,069	51	+12
Labour	Rachel Wise	1,239	31	−8
Conservative	Bob Stevenson	317	8	−9
UKIP	Taff Davies	268	7	+5
Green	Michael Padfield	153	4	+1
Majority		830	20	
Turnout		4,046	40	
Liberal Democrats hold		Swing		

=== Cheadle Hulme South ===
Cheadle Hulme South
Party	Candidate	Votes	%	±%
Liberal Democrats	Suzanne Wyatt*	2,149	53	−3
Conservative	Mark Littlewood	890	22	−6
Labour	Martin Miller	373	9	−1
Green	Malcolm Brown	320	8	+5
UKIP	Cyril Peake	295	7	+5
Majority		1,259	31	
Turnout		4,027	37	
Liberal Democrats hold		Swing		

=== Davenport and Cale Green ===
Davenport and Cale Green
Party	Candidate	Votes	%	±%
Labour	Dickie Davies*	1,650	57	−9
Liberal Democrats	Gemma-Jane Bowker	469	16	+6
Green	Chris Gibbins	424	15	+9
Conservative	Sam Baxter	370	13	−5
Majority		1,181	41	
Turnout		2,913	27	
Labour hold		Swing		

=== Edgeley & Cheadle Heath ===
Edgeley & Cheadle Heath
Party	Candidate	Votes	%	±%
Labour	Matt Wynne	1,797	63	−11
UKIP	Peter Behan	327	11	+8
Green	Shaughan Rick	286	10	+4
Conservative	Richard Walsh	256	9	+1
Liberal Democrats	Oliver Harrison	199	7	−2
Majority		1,470	52	
Turnout		2,865	28	
Labour hold		Swing		

=== Hazel Grove ===
Hazel Grove
Party	Candidate	Votes	%	±%
Liberal Democrats	Lou Ankers	1,993	47.69	+3.63
Conservative	Julian Anthony Lewis-Booth	1,225	29.31	−11.27
Labour	Julie Anne Wharton	457	10.94	−1.46
UKIP	Eunice Ann Normansell	321	7.68	N/A
Green	Clare Brown	183	4.38	+1.42
Majority		768	18.38	
Turnout		4,179	39	
Liberal Democrats gain from Conservative		Swing		

=== Heald Green ===
Heald Green
Party	Candidate	Votes	%	±%
Heald Green Ratepayers	Carole McCann	2,393	69	+10
Labour	Joi Amos	450	13	−4
Conservative	Yvonne Salmons	238	7	−5
Liberal Democrats	Jane O'Neill	208	6	−
Green	Richard Brown	114	5	+2
Majority		1,943	56	
Turnout		3,449	35	
Heald Green Ratepayers hold		Swing		

=== Heatons North ===
Heatons North
Party	Candidate	Votes	%	±%
Labour	Dena Ryness	1,955	50	−11
Conservative	Anne-Marie Wadsworth	727	19	−4
Green	Janet Cuff	616	16	+10
Liberal Democrats	Jenny Humphreys	429	11	+5
Women's Equality	Jen Bryan	188	5	−
Majority		1,228	31	
Turnout		3,915	36	
Labour hold		Swing		

=== Heatons South ===
Heatons South
Party	Candidate	Votes	%	±%
Labour	Dean Fitzpatrick*	2,270	59	−7
Conservative	Beverley Oliver	633	16	−5
Green	Samuel Dugdale	620	16	+9
Liberal Democrats	Charles Gibson	349	9	+3
Majority		1,637	43	
Turnout		3,872	36	
Labour hold		Swing		

=== Manor ===
Manor
Party	Candidate	Votes	%	±%
Labour	Laura Clingan	1,268	45	▼10
Liberal Democrats	Margaret McDermott	761	27	▲1
Conservative	Janice McGahan	301	11	▼2
Green	Anthony Rablen	273	10	▲6
Foundation Party	John Kelly	203	7	N/A
Majority		507	18	▼11
Turnout		2,806	27	▼1
Labour gain from Independent		Swing	▼5.5	

=== Marple North ===
Marple North
Party	Candidate	Votes	%	±%
Liberal Democrats	Becky Senior	2,225	51	+3
Conservative	Hannah Sneddon	940	21	−3
Labour	Claire Vibert	803	18	−
Green	Carolyn Leather	406	9	+4
Majority		1,285	30	
Turnout		4,374	46	
Liberal Democrats gain from Conservative		Swing		

=== Marple South and High Lane ===
Marple South and High Lane
Party	Candidate	Votes	%	±%
Liberal Democrats	Aron Thornley	2,037	46	+4
Independent	Kenny Blair	1,030	23	N/A
Conservative	Darran Palmer	682	15	−24
Labour	Chris Wallis	477	11	−5
Green	Andrew Threlfall	233	5	+2
Majority		1,007	23	
Turnout		4,459	46	
Liberal Democrats gain from Independent		Swing		

=== Offerton ===
Offerton
Party	Candidate	Votes	%	±%
Liberal Democrats	Wendy Meikle*	1,581	57	+5
Conservative	Michael Butler	473	17	+1
Labour	James Pelham	469	17	−13
Green	Simon Edge	274	10	+8
Majority		1,108		
Turnout		2,870	28	
Liberal Democrats hold		Swing		

=== Reddish North ===
Reddish North
Party	Candidate	Votes	%	±%
Labour	Roy Driver*	1,403	58	−15
Green	Helena Mellish	478	20	+13
Conservative	Natalie Fenton	349	14	−2
Liberal Democrats	Susan Ingham	192	8	+4
Majority		925		
Turnout		2,498	24	
Labour hold		Swing		

=== Reddish South ===
Reddish South
Party	Candidate	Votes	%	±%
Labour	Janet Mobbs	1,379	47	−17
Green	Gary Lawson	558	19	+13
Conservative	Sue Carroll	363	12	−7
UKIP	Joshua Seddon	341	12	+7
Liberal Democrats	Alex Orndal	267	9	+3
Majority		821		
Turnout		2,922	28	
Labour hold		Swing		

=== Stepping Hill ===
Stepping Hill
Party	Candidate	Votes	%	±%
Liberal Democrats	Grace Baynham	1,452	37	+2
Conservative	Paul Hadfield*	1,165	30	−7
Labour	Drew Carswell	1,021	26	+2
Green	Ken Pease	280	7	+3
Majority		287		
Turnout		3,974	39	
Liberal Democrats gain from Conservative		Swing		

== Changes since this election ==
=== Hazel Grove ===
Hazel Grove by-election: 1 August 2019
Party	Candidate	Votes	%	±%
Liberal Democrats	Charles Gibson	1,401	46	−2
Conservative	Oliver Johnstone	1,194	39	+10
Labour	Julie Wharton	329	11	0
Green	Michael Padfield	142	5	+1
Majority		207		
Turnout		3,066	28	
Liberal Democrats hold		Swing		
