= 2012 Stockport Metropolitan Borough Council election =

2012 UK local government election

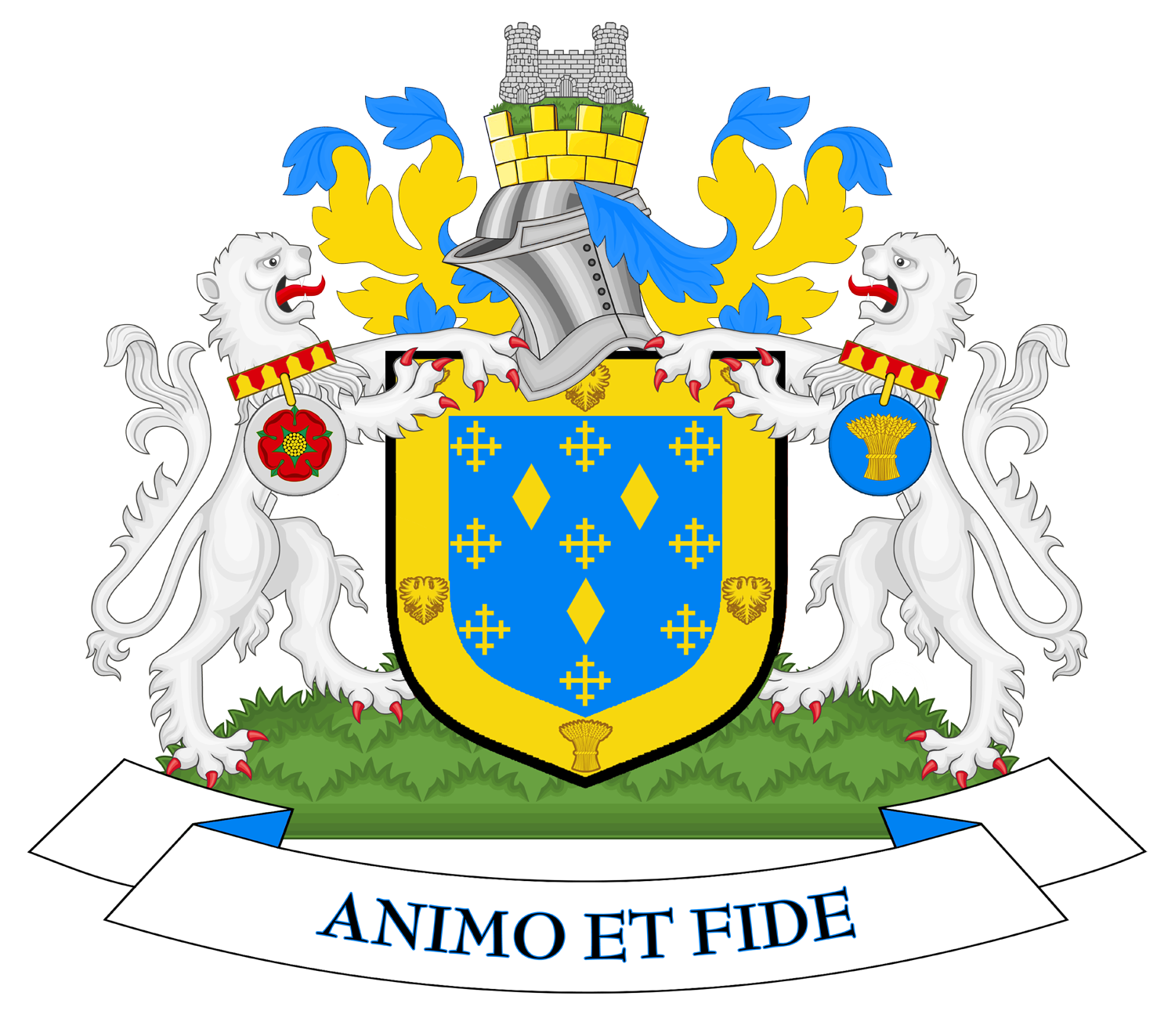
- 3 May 2012

21 Seats up for Election
	First party	Second party
Leader	Dave Goddard	Andrew Verdeille
Party	Liberal Democrats	Labour
Leader's seat	Offerton	Reddish South
Seats before	31	16
Seats won	10	8
Seats after	28	21
Seat change	▼3	▲5
	Third party	Fourth party
Leader	Syd Lloyd	Peter Burns
Party	Conservative	Heald Green Ratepayers
Leader's seat	Bredbury Green & Romiley	Heald Green
Seats before	11	3
Seats won	2	1
Seats after	10	3
Seat change	▼1	Steady
- Map showing the results of the 2012 Stockport Metropolitan Borough Council elections by ward. Red shows Labour seats, blue shows the Conservatives, yellow shows the Liberal Democrats and green the Heald Green Ratepayers.
Council Leader before election
Dave Goddard
Liberal Democrats
Subsequent Council Leader
Sue Derbyshire
Liberal Democrats

The 2012 Stockport Metropolitan Borough Council election took place on 3 May 2012 to elect members of Stockport Metropolitan Borough Council in England. It was on the same day as other 2012 United Kingdom local elections.

The state of the parties after the election was:

Following the election, the Lib Dem minority administration was able to continue in office however the leader of the council, Dave Goddard, lost his seat to Labour by 45 votes, meaning that he was replaced by Sue Derbyshire.

Party	Seats	+/-	% votes
Liberal Democrat	28	–3	
Labour	21	+5	
Conservative	10	–1	
Heald Green Ratepayer	3	0	
People Matter	1	0	

== Ward results ==
An asterisk denotes an incumbent.

=== Bramhall North ward ===
Bramhall North
Party	Candidate	Votes	%	±%
Conservative	Linda Holt*	2,291	52.26	−4.01
Liberal Democrats	Helen Foster-Grime	1,572	35.86	−1.46
Labour	Brian Harrop	521	11.88	+9.30
Majority		719	16.40	
Turnout		4,413	41.36	
Conservative hold		Swing		

=== Bramhall South ward ===
Bramhall South
Party	Candidate	Votes	%	±%
Conservative	Brian Bagnall*	1,900	49.48	−9.93
Liberal Democrats	Pauline Banham	1,007	26.22	−7.20
Labour	Beryl Dykes	389	10.13	+6.47
UKIP	David Perry	342	8.91	+5.40
Green	Ross White	202	5.26	N/A
Majority		893	23.26	
Turnout		3,852	39.32	
Conservative hold		Swing		

=== Bredbury & Woodley ward ===
Bredbury & Woodley
Party	Candidate	Votes	%	±%
Liberal Democrats	Christine Corris	1,333	41.19	−19.76
Labour	Roy Driver	1,152	35.60	+26.08
Conservative	Chris Kelly	469	14.49	−15.04
BNP	Andy Webster	282	8.71	N/A
Majority		181	5.59	
Turnout		3,252	29.95	
Liberal Democrats hold		Swing		

=== Bredbury Green & Romiley ward ===
Bredbury Green & Romiley
Party	Candidate	Votes	%	±%
Liberal Democrats	Hazel Lees *	1,594	41.14	−6.82
Conservative	Sally Bennett	1,332	34.37	−10.94
Labour	Kathryn Priestley	790	20.39	+13.66
BNP	Tony Dean	159	4.10	N/A
Majority		262	6.76	
Turnout		3,888	35.62	
Liberal Democrats hold		Swing		

=== Brinnington & Central ward ===
Brinnington & Central
Party	Candidate	Votes	%	±%
Labour	Andy Sorton	1,677	70.40	+32.95
UKIP	Phil Lewis	281	11.80	N/A
Liberal Democrats	John Reid	196	8.23	−38.69
Conservative	Stephen Holgate	158	6.63	−2.98
Independent	John Heginbotham	70	2.94	N/A
Majority		1,396	58.61	
Turnout		2,387	23.30	
Labour gain from Liberal Democrats		Swing		

=== Cheadle & Gatley ward ===
Cheadle & Gatley
Party	Candidate	Votes	%	±%
Liberal Democrats	Keith Holloway	2,030	42.52	−2.92
Conservative	Mick Jones	1,770	37.08	−8.72
Labour	Colin Owen	974	20.40	+11.64
Majority		260	5.45	
Turnout		4,800	41.33	
Liberal Democrats gain from Conservative		Swing		

=== Cheadle Hulme North ward ===
Cheadle Hulme North
Party	Candidate	Votes	%	±%
Liberal Democrats	John Pantall	1,762	52.44	−4.39
Labour	Emily Hewson	985	29.32	+22.78
Conservative	Chris Green	613	18.24	−13.01
Majority		777	23.13	
Turnout		3,384	33.27	
Liberal Democrats hold		Swing		

=== Chealde Hulme South ward ===
Cheadle Hulme South
Party	Candidate	Votes	%	±%
Liberal Democrats	Lenny Grice*	1,876	46.86	−4.47
Conservative	Julie Smith-Jones	1,157	28.90	−10.54
Labour	Theo Smith	579	14.46	+11.43
UKIP	Cyril Peake	391	9.77	+6.85
Majority		719	17.96	
Turnout		4,015	37.76	
Liberal Democrats hold		Swing		

=== Davenport & Cale Green ward ===
Davenport & Cale Green
Party	Candidate	Votes	%	±%
Labour	Wendy Wild	1,492	45.92	+17.19
Liberal Democrats	Ann Smith*	1,235	38.01	−7.39
Conservative	Jackie Jones	279	8.59	−10.15
Green	Phil Shaw	206	6.34	N/A
Liberal	Graham Ogden	37	1.14	N/A
Majority		257	7.91	
Turnout		3,260	29.54	
Labour gain from Liberal Democrats		Swing		

=== Edgeley & Cheadle Heath ward ===
Edgeley & Cheadle Heath
Party	Candidate	Votes	%	±%
Labour	Sheila Bailey*	2,205	74.59	+27.90
Conservative	Christine Holgate	284	9.61	−5.91
Liberal Democrats	Alan Livingstone	250	8.46	−22.91
Green	Camilla Luff	217	7.34	+0.92
Majority		1,921	65.00	
Turnout		2,968	27.83	
Labour hold		Swing		

=== Hazel Grove ward ===
Hazel Grove
Party	Candidate	Votes	%	±%
Liberal Democrats	Kevin Hogg*	1,736	42.05	−12.80
Conservative	Oliver Johnstone	1,668	40.41	+1.39
Labour	Catherine Sheppard	724	17.54	+11.41
Majority		68	1.65	
Turnout		4,148	37.63	
Liberal Democrats hold		Swing		

=== Heald Green ward ===
Heald Green
Party	Candidate	Votes	%	±%
Independent	Peter Burns*	2,303	70.28	+1.76
Labour	Martin Miller	423	12.91	+7.70
Liberal Democrats	David Robert-Jones	214	6.53	−2.77
Conservative	Patricia Leck	208	6.35	−4.11
BNP	Richard Skill	129	3.94	−2.59
Majority		1,880	57.37	
Turnout		3,284	32.89	
Independent hold		Swing		

=== Heatons North ward ===
Heatons North
Party	Candidate	Votes	%	±%
Labour	David Sedgwick	1,913	47.90	+22.34
Conservative	Barbara Judson	1,553	38.88	−13.99
Green	Janet Cuff	364	9.11	+0.53
Liberal Democrats	Andrew Rawling	164	4.11	−5.04
Majority		360	9.01	
Turnout		4,008	38.13	
Labour gain from Conservative		Swing		

=== Heatons South ward ===
Heatons South
Party	Candidate	Votes	%	±%
Labour	Colin Foster*	2,706	67.85	+22.55
Conservative	Bryan Lees	869	21.79	−15.24
Liberal Democrats	Ronald Axtell	274	6.87	−3.42
BNP	Sheila Spink	139	3.49	N/A
Majority		1,837	46.06	
Turnout		4,002	36.58	
Labour hold		Swing		

=== Manor ward ===
Manor
Party	Candidate	Votes	%	±%
Liberal Democrats	Sue Derbyshire*	1,415	44.32	−1.07
Labour	Walter Barrett	1,391	43.56	+20.19
Conservative	Leslie Judson	235	7.36	−10.07
BNP	Duncan Warner	152	4.76	−9.06
Majority		24	0.75	
Turnout		3,211	30.52	
Liberal Democrats hold		Swing		

=== Marple North ward ===
Marple North
Party	Candidate	Votes	%	±%
Liberal Democrats	Martin Candler*	1,700	41.77	−9.48
Conservative	Annette Finnie	1,098	26.98	−8.62
Labour	David Rowbottom	574	14.10	+9.01
UKIP	Ray Jones	374	9.19	N/A
Green	Maggie Preston	294	7.22	−0.84
Independent	Barry Minshall	30	0.74	N/A
Majority		602	14.79	
Turnout		4,076	41.34	
Liberal Democrats hold		Swing		

=== Marple South ward ===
Marple South
Party	Candidate	Votes	%	±%
Liberal Democrats	Shan Alexander*	1,906	49.79	−1.82
Conservative	Carl Rydings	906	23.67	−11.33
Labour	Clifford Stanway	549	14.34	+10.54
UKIP	Tony Moore	467	12.20	+7.14
Majority		1,000	26.12	
Turnout		3,851	39.57	
Liberal Democrats hold		Swing		

=== Offerton ward ===
Dave Goddard had been the leader of Stockport Council before he lost his seat in this election. Laura Booth left Labour in 2014 and joined the Lib Dems in 2015. She was re-elected as the Lib Dem councillor for Offerton in 2016.

Offerton
Party	Candidate	Votes	%	±%
Labour	Laura Booth	1,346	36.81	+26.88
Liberal Democrats	Dave Goddard*	1,301	35.58	−13.22
Conservative	Steve Rodriquez	661	18.07	−4.05
UKIP	Harry Perry	349	9.54	N/A
Majority		45	1.23	
Turnout		3,663	34.95	
Labour gain from Liberal Democrats		Swing		

=== Reddish North ward ===
Reddish North
Party	Candidate	Votes	%	±%
Labour	Kate Butler	2,027	69.39	+20.86
Conservative	Julia Whelan	365	12.50	−12.80
BNP	Paul Bennett	329	11.26	−3.29
Liberal Democrats	Louise Shaw	200	6.85	−4.77
Majority		1,662	56.90	
Turnout		2,933	27.26	
Labour hold		Swing		

=== Reddish South ward ===
Reddish South
Party	Candidate	Votes	%	±%
Labour	Andy Verdeille*	2,028	70.22	+20.74
Conservative	Anthony Hannay	390	13.50	−19.33
Liberal Democrats	Norman Beverley	278	9.63	−8.06
BNP	Ged Williams	192	6.65	N/A
Majority		1,638	56.72	
Turnout		2,905	27.83	
Labour hold		Swing		

=== Stepping Hill ward ===
Stepping Hill
Party	Candidate	Votes	%	±%
Liberal Democrats	Wendy Orrell	1,422	39.07	−14.40
Conservative	John Wright	955	26.24	−10.34
Labour	Janet Rothwell	815	22.39	+16.38
UKIP	Izzy Bolton	229	6.29	N/A
Green	Ken Pease	219	6.02	+2.07
Majority		467	12.83	
Turnout		3,654	37.50	
Liberal Democrats hold		Swing		

== Changes 2012–2014 ==
Patrick McAuley, who had left Labour in January 2012 to sit as an independent, joined the Liberal Democrat group in December 2012,
