= 2016 Stockport Metropolitan Borough Council election =

2016 local election in England

Stockport Metropolitan Council Election 2016
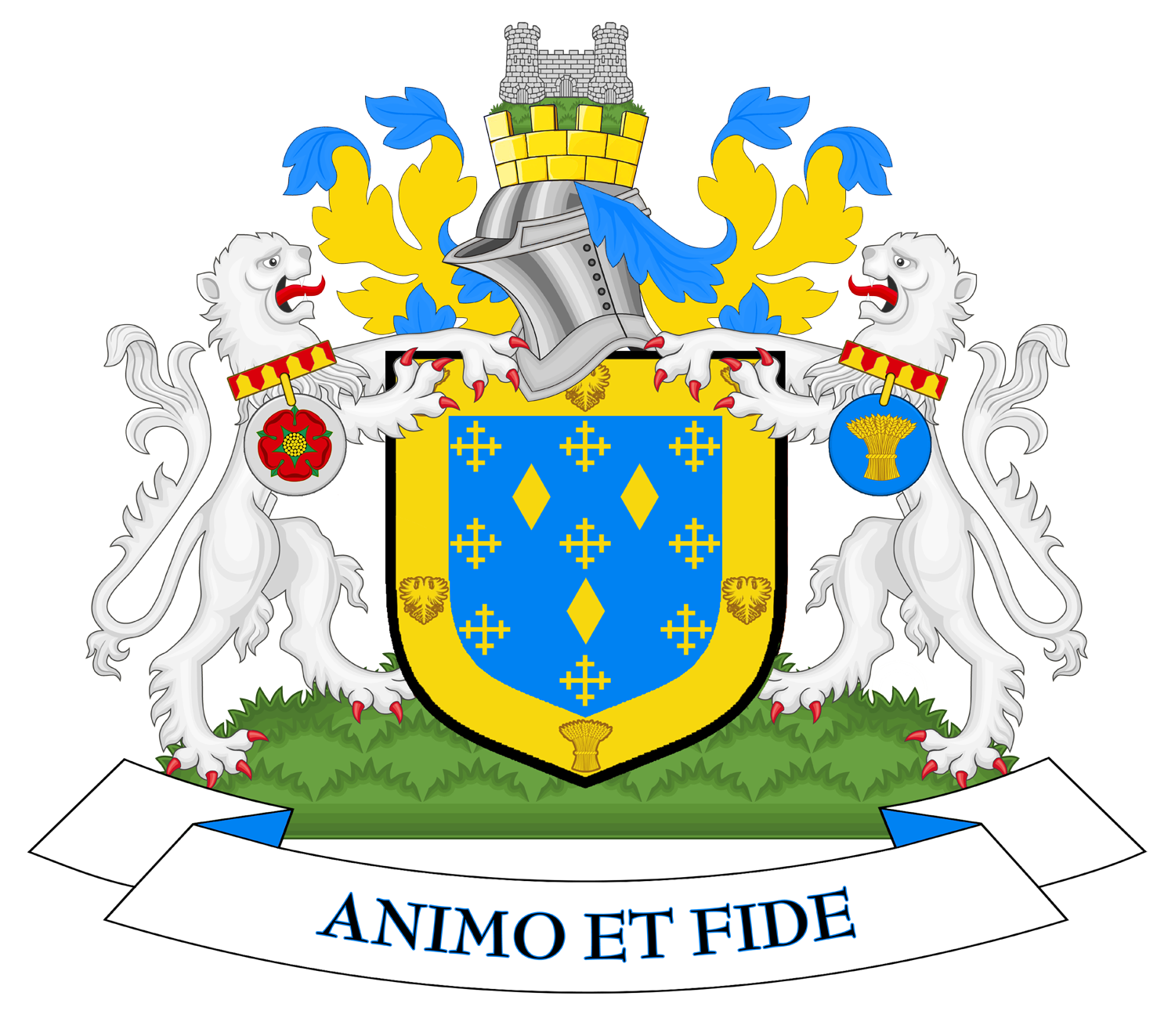
- 5 May 2016

21 Seats up for Election
	First party	Second party
Party	Labour	Liberal Democrats
Seats before	23	24
Seats won	8	9
Seats after	23	23
Seat change	Steady	▼1
	Third party	Fourth party
Party	Conservative	Heald Green Ratepayers
Seats before	13	3
Seats won	3	1
Seats after	14	3
Seat change	▲1	Steady
- Map showing the results of the 2016 Stockport Metropolitan Borough Council elections by ward. Red shows Labour seats, blue shows the Conservatives, yellow shows the Liberal Democrats and green the Heald Green Ratepayers.
Leader of the Council before election
Sue Derbyshire
Liberal Democrats
Leader of the Council
Alex Ganotis
Labour

The 2016 Stockport Metropolitan Borough Council election took place on 5 May 2016 to elect members of Stockport Metropolitan Borough Council in England. This was on the same day as other local elections. Stockport Council is elected in thirds which means that in each three member local ward, one councillor is elected every year, except every four years which is classed as fallow year. The last fallow year was 2013, when no local government elections took place in the borough. Those councillors elected would serve a four-year term expiring in 2020, the term was subsequently extended for a further year due to the deferral of the 2020 UK local elections.

Following the elections, the Lib Dem minority administration was replaced by a Labour minority administration. The Liberal Democrats had previously governed Stockport with a majority from 2002, and in a minority since 2011. This was able to occur as a result of a Liberal Democrat councillor defecting to Labour on election night, leaving Labour as the largest party with 23 councillors to the Liberal Democrats 21.

== Election results by ward ==
Asterisk (*) indicates incumbent in the Ward, and Bold names highlight winning candidate.

=== Bramhall North ===
Bramhall North
Party	Candidate	Votes	%	±%
Conservative	Linda Holt*	2,400	53	
Liberal Democrats	Pauline Banham	1,177	26	
Labour	David Lee White	432	10	
UKIP	Joan Anne Wells	316	7	
Green	Deborah Evelyn Hind	189	4	
Majority		1,223		
Turnout		4,514	43	
Conservative hold		Swing		

=== Bramhall South & Woodford ===
Bramhall South & Woodford
Party	Candidate	Votes	%	±%
Conservative	Brian Bagnall*	1,972	44	
Liberal Democrats	Jeremy Richard Meal	1,657	37	
Labour	Philip Stanley Matley	260	6	
Independent	Paul Bellis	248	6	
UKIP	David Perry	236	5	
Green	Malcolm Brown	127	3	
Majority		315		
Turnout		4,500	47	
Conservative hold		Swing		

=== Bredbury & Woodley ===
Bredbury and Woodley
Party	Candidate	Votes	%	±%
Liberal Democrats	Christine Corris*	1,539	45	
Labour	Amanda Green	692	20	
Conservative	Jamie Holt	618	18	
UKIP	Richard Ellis	504	15	
Green	Conrad Beard	103	3	
Majority		847		
Turnout		3,456		
Liberal Democrats hold		Swing		

=== Bredbury Green & Romiley ===
Bredbury Green & Romiley
Party	Candidate	Votes	%	±%
Liberal Democrats	Lisa Smart*	2,284	51	
Conservative	Sally Bennett	1,442	32	
Labour	Brian Wild	602	13	
Green	Gavin Pate	151	3	
Majority		842		
Turnout		4,479	41	
Liberal Democrats hold		Swing		

=== Brinnington & Central ===
Brinnington & Central
Party	Candidate	Votes	%	±%
Labour	Andy Sorton*	1,889	77	
Green	James Pelham	288	12	
Conservative	Ros Lloyd	272	11	
Majority		1,601	25	
Turnout		2,449	25	
Labour hold		Swing		

=== Cheadle & Gatley ===
Cheadle & Gatley
Party	Candidate	Votes	%	±%
Liberal Democrats	Keith Holloway*	2,037	42	
Conservative	Dawn Calmonson	1,536	31	
Labour	Colin Owen	850	17	
UKIP	Julie Warburton	337	7	
Green	Natasha Brooks	144	3	
Majority		501		
Turnout		4,904	42	
Liberal Democrats hold		Swing		

=== Cheadle Hulme North ===
Cheadle Hulme North
Party	Candidate	Votes	%	±%
Liberal Democrats	John Pantall*	1,709	47	
Labour	Liz Marron	824	22	
Conservative	Natalie Fenton	587	16	
UKIP	Taff Davies	409	11	
Green	Michael Padfield	144	4	
Majority		885		
Turnout		3,673	37	
Liberal Democrats hold		Swing		

=== Cheadle Hulme South ===
Cheadle Hulme South
Party	Candidate	Votes	%	±%
Liberal Democrats	Mark Hunter	2,830	60	
Conservative	Stephen Robinson	1,060	23	
Labour	Chris Carter	335	7	
UKIP	Cyril Peake	335	7	
Green	Clare Brown	136	3	
Majority		1,770		
Turnout		4,696	45	
Liberal Democrats hold		Swing		

=== Davenport & Cale Green ===
Davenport & Cale Green
Party	Candidate	Votes	%	±%
Labour	Wendy Wild*	1,935	57	
UKIP	Dottie Hopkins	469	14	
Liberal Democrats	Helen Shaw	411	12	
Conservative	Gill Shaw	390	11	
Green	Chris Gibbins	194	6	
Majority		1,466		
Turnout		3,399	32	
Labour hold		Swing		

=== Edgeley & Cheadle Heath ===
Edgeley & Cheadle Heath
Party	Candidate	Votes	%	±%
Labour	Sheila Bailey*	2,214	68	
UKIP	Peter Behan	393	12	
Conservative	Maureen Baldwin-Moore	252	8	
Green	Gordon Combe	198	6	
Liberal Democrats	Claire Halliwell	192	6	
Majority		1,821		
Turnout		3,249	31	
Labour hold		Swing		

=== Hazel Grove ===
Hazel Grove
Party	Candidate	Votes	%	±%
Liberal Democrats	Jon Twigge	1,777	39	
Conservative	Sue Carroll	1,494	33	
Labour	Julie Wharton	634	14	
UKIP	Tara O'Brien	534	12	
Green	Ken Pease	120	3	
Majority		283		
Turnout		4,559	43	
Liberal Democrats hold		Swing		

=== Heald Green ===
Heald Green
Party	Candidate	Votes	%	±%
Heald Green Ratepayers	Anna Charles-Jones	2,002	54	0
Labour	Kath Priestley	572	16	+2
Conservative	Yvonne Salmons	404	11	+2
UKIP	Tony Moore	347	9	–6
Liberal Democrats	Gahffar Karim	294	8	+1
Green	Camilla Luff	64	2	N/A
Majority		1,430		
Turnout		3,683	37	
Heald Green Ratepayers hold		Swing		

=== Heatons North ===
Heatons North
Party	Candidate	Votes	%	±%
Labour	David Sedgwick*	2,602	61	
Conservative	Pamela Haworth	1,051	25	
Green	Janet Cuff	377	9	
Liberal Democrats	Jenny Humphreys	231	5	
Majority		1,551		
Turnout		4,261	41	
Labour hold		Swing		

=== Heatons South ===
Heatons South
Party	Candidate	Votes	%	±%
Labour	Colin Foster*	2,962	68	
Conservative	Robert Stevenson	805	19	
Liberal Democrats	James Feetham	305	7	
Green	Samuel Dugdale	279	6	
Majority		2,157		
Turnout		4,351	40	
Labour hold		Swing		

=== Manor ===
Sue Derbyshire had been the leader of Stockport Council before she lost her seat in this election.

Manor
Party	Candidate	Votes	%	±%
Labour	Charlie Stewart	1,624	44	
Liberal Democrats	Sue Derbyshire*	1,187	32	
UKIP	John Kelly	508	14	
Conservative	Janice McGahan	208	6	
Green	Nancy Richardson	123	3	
Independent	John Pearson	39	1	
Majority		437		
Turnout		3,689	36	
Labour gain from Liberal Democrats		Swing		

=== Marple North ===
Marple North
Party	Candidate	Votes	%	±%
Liberal Democrats	Malcolm Allan	1,985	42	
Conservative	John Bates	1,393	29	
Labour	David Rowbottom	545	11	
UKIP	Ray Jones	316	7	
Independent	Kevin Dowling	315	7	
Green	Trevor Smith	207	4	
Majority		592		
Turnout		4,761	49	
Liberal Democrats hold		Swing		

=== Marple South ===
Marple South
Party	Candidate	Votes	%	±%
Conservative	Tom Dowse	1,651	37	
Liberal Democrats	Colin MacAlister	1,628	36	
Labour	Sheila Townsend	585	13	
UKIP	Grahame Bradbury	447	10	
Green	Graham Reid	178	4	
Majority		23		
Turnout		4,489	46	
Conservative gain from Liberal Democrats		Swing		

=== Offerton ===
Laura Booth was previously the Labour Party councillor for Offerton. She left Labour in 2014 and joined the Lib Dems in 2015.

Offerton
Party	Candidate	Votes	%	±%
Liberal Democrats	Laura Booth*	1,282	35	
Labour	Janet Glover	1,000	27	
UKIP	Darran Palmer	666	18	
Conservative	Richard Britton	614	17	
Green	Simon Edge	88	2	
Majority		282		
Turnout		3,650	36	
Liberal Democrats gain from Labour		Swing		

=== Reddish North ===
Reddish North
Party	Candidate	Votes	%	±%
Labour	Kate Butler*	1,763	56	
UKIP	Josh Seddon	503	16	
Independent	Jeanette Doyle	412	13	
Conservative	Diane Fenton	277	9	
Green	Helena Mellish	95	3	
Liberal Democrats	Paul Ankers	92	3	
Majority		1,260		
Turnout		3,142	30	
Labour hold		Swing		

=== Reddish South ===
Reddish South
Party	Candidate	Votes	%	±%
Labour	Yvonne Guariento	1,836	58	
UKIP	Ann Moore	445	14	
Conservative	Alexander Fenton	442	14	
Green	Gary Lawson	223	7	
Liberal Democrats	Brian Hendley	189	6	
Majority		1,391		
Turnout		3,177	31	
Labour hold		Swing		

=== Stepping Hill ===
Stepping Hill
Party	Candidate	Votes	%	±%
Liberal Democrats	Mark Weldon	1,592	39	
Conservative	Jon Shaw	1,221	30	
Labour	Dena Ryness	712	17	
UKIP	Izzy Bolton	387	9	
Green	Steve Torley	206	5	
Majority		371		
Turnout		4,128	42	
Liberal Democrats hold		Swing		

== Changes since this election ==
=== Brinnington & Central ===
Brinnington and Central by-election 8 June 2017
Party	Candidate	Votes	%	±%
Labour	Becky Crawford	3,877	75.0	
Conservative	Ros Lloyd	875	16.9	
Liberal Democrats	Alex Orndal	193	3.7	
Green	James Thomas Pelham	170	3.3	
Independent	John Chapman Pearson	56	1.1	
Majority		3,002	55.1	
Turnout		5,190	48.4	
Labour hold		Swing		
