= 2024 Stockport Metropolitan Borough Council election =

2024 local government election in Stockport

- 2 May 2024

21 out of 63 seats to Stockport Metropolitan Borough Council 32 seats needed for a majority

	Majority party	Minority party	Third party
Leader	Mark Hunter	David Meller	Gary Lawson
Party	Liberal Democrats	Labour	Green
Last election	30 seats, 38.5%	24 seats, 32.5%	3 seats, 7.2%
Seats before	29	24	3
Seats after	31	22	3
Seat change	▲2	▼2	Steady
Popular vote	27,834	25,837	8,849
Percentage	34.2%	31.7%	10.9%
Swing	▼4.3%	▼0.8%	▲3.7%
	Fourth party	Fifth party	Sixth party
Leader	Anna Charles-Jones	Matt Wynne
Party	Heald Green Ratepayers	Community Association	Independent
Last election	3 seats, 2.2%	3 seats, 2.2%	0 seats, 0.5%
Seats before	3	3	1
Seats after	3	3	1
Seat change	Steady	Steady	Steady
Popular vote	1,787	1,751	353
Percentage	2.2%	2.2%	0.4%
Swing	0.0%	0.0%	▼0.1%
- Winner of each seat at the 2024 Stockport Metropolitan Borough Council election
Leader before election
Mark Hunter
Liberal Democrat
No overall control
Leader after election
Mark Hunter
Liberal Democrat
No overall control

The 2024 Stockport Metropolitan Borough Council election was held on 2 May 2024 to elect 21 out of 63 members of the Stockport Metropolitan Borough Council. The election took place at the same time as the 2024 Greater Manchester mayoral election and other local elections across England.

Prior to the election the council was under no overall control, being led by a Liberal Democrat minority administration. The election saw the Liberal Democrats gain two seats from Labour, but they remained one seat short of an overall majority.

== Previous council composition ==
After 2023 election		Before 2024 election		After 2024 election	
Party	Seats	Party	Seats	Party	Seats
Liberal Democrats	30	Liberal Democrats	29	Liberal Democrats	31
Labour	24	Labour	24	Labour	22
Heald Green Ratepayers	3	Heald Green Ratepayers	3	Heald Green Ratepayers	3
Green	3	Green	3	Green	3
Community Association	3	Community Association	3	Community Association	3
Independent	0	Independent	1	Independent	1

== Results summary ==
2024 Stockport Metropolitan Borough Council election
Party	This election			Full council			This election		
Party	Seats	Net	Seats %	Other	Total	Total %	Votes	Votes %	+/−
Liberal Democrats	11	▲2	52.4	20	31	49.2	27,824	34.2	–4.3
Labour	7	▼2	33.3	15	22	34.9	25,837	31.7	–0.8
Green	1	Steady	4.8	2	3	4.8	8,849	10.9	+3.7
Heald Green Ratepayers	1	Steady	4.8	2	3	4.8	1,787	2.2	±0.0
Community Association	1	Steady	4.8	2	3	4.8	1,751	2.2	±0.0
Independent	0	Steady	0.0	1	1	1.6	353	0.4	–0.1
Conservative	0	Steady	0.0	0	0	0.0	13,601	16.7	+0.4
Party of Women	0	Steady	0.0	0	0	0.0	139	0.2	N/A
Women's Equality	0	Steady	0.0	0	0	0.0	94	0.1	–0.1

== Ward results ==
=== Bramhall North ===
Bramhall North
Party	Candidate	Votes	%	±%
Liberal Democrats	Alex Wynne*	2,021	47.8	+7.5
Conservative	Linda Holt	1,534	36.2	−1.7
Labour	Mike Bennett	411	9.7	+2.4
Green	Deborah Hind	264	6.2	−4.7
Majority		487	11.6	
Turnout		4,265	43.7	−0.1
Registered electors		9,755		
Liberal Democrats hold		Swing		

=== Bramhall South & Woodford ===
Bramhall South & Woodford
Party	Candidate	Votes	%	±%
Liberal Democrats	Jeremy Meal*	2,185	44.9	−1.2
Conservative	Peter Crossen	2,104	43.2	+0.6
Labour	Sandy Broadhurst	344	7.0	+1.7
Green	Andrew Dearden	231	4.7	−4.5
Majority		81	1.7	
Turnout		4,899	47.1	+0.9
Registered electors		10,392		
Liberal Democrats hold		Swing		

=== Bredbury & Woodley ===
Bredbury & Woodley
Party	Candidate	Votes	%	±%
Labour	Rosemary Barratt*	1,756	47.4	+8.3
Liberal Democrats	Dan Willis	1,269	34.2	−2.5
Conservative	Bernie Wylde	501	13.5	+2.3
Green	Michael Padfield	180	4.8	−3.4
Majority		487	13.2	
Turnout		3,757	34.4	−0.2
Registered electors		10,900		
Labour hold		Swing		

=== Bredbury Green & Romiley ===
Bredbury Green & Romiley
Party	Candidate	Votes	%	±%
Liberal Democrats	Mark Roberts*	2,192	58.7	+1.5
Conservative	Pat Bentley	695	18.6	+1.6
Labour	Peter Black	634	17.0	+3.4
Green	Stephanie Wyatt	213	5.7	−3.2
Majority		1497	40.1	
Turnout		3,777	35.9	+1.9
Registered electors		10,526		
Liberal Democrats hold		Swing		

=== Brinnington & Stockport Central ===
Brinnington & Stockport Central
Party	Candidate	Votes	%	±%
Labour	Karl Marx Wardlaw*	1,069	61.0	+7.5
Liberal Democrats	Jamie Hirst	254	14.4	+0.6
Conservative	Rosalind Lloyd	219	12.5	−1.6
Green	Antony Rablen	210	12.0	−5.9
Majority		815	46.6	
Turnout		1,785	19.6	+2.0
Registered electors		9,082		
Labour hold		Swing		

=== Cheadle East & Cheadle Hulme North ===
Cheadle East & Cheadle Hulme North
Party	Candidate	Votes	%	±%
Liberal Democrats	Mike Newman	1,927	44.7	+6.7
Labour	Yvonne Guariento*	1,743	40.4	+0.2
Conservative	Naveed Khan	372	8.6	−0.6
Green	Mandy Padfield	270	6.2	−2.9
Majority		184	4.3	
Turnout		4,357	37.8	+1.9
Registered electors		11,525		
Liberal Democrats gain from Labour		Swing		

=== Cheadle Hulme South ===
Cheadle Hulme South
Party	Candidate	Votes	%	±%
Liberal Democrats	Keith Holloway*	2,637	56.2	+0.8
Conservative	Brian Dougal	828	17.7	+0.9
Labour	Barry Hawkins	813	17.4	+1.4
Green	Peter Atkinson	387	8.3	−3.3
Majority		1,809	38.5	
Turnout		4,707	39.9	+3.0
Registered electors		11,796		
Liberal Democrats hold		Swing		

=== Cheadle West & Gatley ===
Cheadle West & Gatley
Party	Candidate	Votes	%	±%
Liberal Democrats	Tom Morrison*	2,515	57.1	+6.8
Labour	Colin Owen	863	19.6	+2.7
Conservative	Faria Khan	626	14.2	−3.0
Green	Alexander Drury	398	9.0	−6.6
Majority		1,652	37.5	
Turnout		4,467	39.1	+3.7
Registered electors		11,411		
Liberal Democrats hold		Swing		

=== Davenport & Cale Green ===
Davenport & Cale Green
Party	Candidate	Votes	%	±%
Labour	Paul Wright	1,923	53.7	−3.5
Liberal Democrats	Dominic Wells	548	15.3	−1.7
Green	Paolo Granelli	425	11.9	−4.1
Reform	Doreen Hopkins	283	7.9	+2.2
Conservative	Nathan Lumb	266	7.4	−5.8
Party of Women	Tara Hughes	139	3.9	N/A
Majority		1,375	38.4	
Turnout		3,602	31.1	+2.8
Registered electors		11,567		
Labour hold		Swing		

=== Edgeley ===
Edgeley
Party	Candidate	Votes	%	±%
Community Association	Asa Caton*	1,751	59.3	+12.5
Labour	Callum Walmsley	847	28.7	−9.2
Green	Patrick Ralph	178	6.0	−0.5
Liberal Democrats	Douglas Greenhalgh	89	3.0	−3.0
Conservative	Karl Seppman	87	2.9	−0.5
Majority		904	30.6	
Turnout		2,976	33.3	−1.7
Registered electors		8,930		
Community Association hold		Swing		

=== Hazel Grove ===
Hazel Grove
Party	Candidate	Votes	%	±%
Liberal Democrats	Frankie Singleton*	1,524	42.1	−0.7
Conservative	Tim Morley	937	25.9	−1.3
Labour	Johnny White	757	20.9	+7.1
Green	Fiona Bullock	401	11.1	+0.1
Majority		587	16.2	
Turnout		3,679	35.3	+2.7
Registered electors		10,432		
Liberal Democrats hold		Swing		

=== Heald Green ===
Heald Green
Party	Candidate	Votes	%	±%
Heald Green Ratepayers	Catherine Stuart*	1,787	43.3	+1.7
Liberal Democrats	Qasim Ahmed	1,143	27.7	+0.6
Labour	Kath Priestley	626	15.2	−1.9
Conservative	Yvonne Salmons	383	9.3	+1.3
Green	Chitra Ramachandran	189	4.6	−0.9
Majority		644	15.6	
Turnout		4,151	37.5	+4.1
Registered electors		11,077		
Heald Green Ratepayers hold		Swing		

=== Heatons North ===
Heatons North
Party	Candidate	Votes	%	±%
Labour	Dena Ryness*	2,770	62.1	−0.6
Green	Sam Dugdale	821	18.4	−2.8
Conservative	Hassan Sajjad	563	12.6	−2.6
Liberal Democrats	Jeffrey Scroggie	308	6.9	−2.2
Majority		1,949	43.7	
Turnout		4,513	41.2	+2.3
Registered electors		10,961		
Labour hold		Swing		

=== Heatons South ===
Heatons South
Party	Candidate	Votes	%	±%
Labour	Claire Vibert*	2,787	64.1	+1.7
Green	Laura Smith	692	15.9	−7.0
Conservative	Joel Tennuchi	469	10.8	−3.1
Liberal Democrats	Margaret McDermott	403	9.3	−0.8
Majority		2,095	48.2	
Turnout		4,396	40.4	+2.1
Registered electors		10,878		
Labour hold		Swing		

=== Manor ===
Manor
Party	Candidate	Votes	%	±%
Labour	Jon Byrne	1,583	52.3	+13.2
Liberal Democrats	Jason Jones	779	25.7	−9.0
Reform	Stephen Speakman	281	9.3	+4.9
Conservative	Janice McGahan	195	6.4	−1.5
Green	Fiona Aviani-Bartram	188	6.2	−3.0
Majority		804	26.6	
Turnout		3,038	30.0	+0.8
Registered electors		10,086		
Labour hold		Swing		

=== Marple North ===
Marple North
Party	Candidate	Votes	%	±%
Liberal Democrats	Micheala Meikle	2,186	49.7	−7.1
Conservative	Nigel Noble	757	17.2	−0.4
Labour	Mike Hill	695	15.8	+3.1
Green	John Bright	407	9.3	−5.8
Independent	Steve Hatton	353	8.0	+1.5
Majority		1,429	32.5	
Turnout		4,426	46.7	+1.1
Registered electors		9,479		
Liberal Democrats hold		Swing		

=== Marple South & High Lane ===
Marple South & High Lane
Party	Candidate	Votes	%	±%
Liberal Democrats	Colin MacAlister*	2,099	54.9	+0.1
Conservative	Elizabeth Arnold	767	20.1	−3.7
Labour	Mags Hindle	562	14.7	+2.2
Green	Andrew Threlfall	397	10.4	−4.6
Majority		1,332	34.8	
Turnout		3,876	39.5	+1.3
Registered electors		9,806		
Liberal Democrats hold		Swing		

=== Norbury & Woodsmoor ===
Norbury & Woodsmoor
Party	Candidate	Votes	%	±%
Liberal Democrats	Pete West*	1,984	42.9	+5.3
Conservative	Oliver Johnstone	1,478	31.9	−3.8
Labour	Colin Devine	712	15.4	−1.2
Reform	Lynn Schofield	260	5.6	+3.1
Green	Philip Handscomb	192	4.2	−4.2
Majority		506	11.0	
Turnout		4,648	46.2	+2.3
Registered electors		10,061		
Liberal Democrats hold		Swing		

=== Offerton ===
Offerton
Party	Candidate	Votes	%	±%
Liberal Democrats	Dan Oliver	1,512	39.5	+1.2
Labour	Will Sharp*	1,487	38.9	+0.3
Reform	John Kelly	337	8.8	+4.0
Conservative	Andrew Lord	287	7.5	−5.6
Green	Steve Torley	203	5.3	−4.9
Majority		25	0.7	
Turnout		3,841	34.4	+1.1
Registered electors		11,162		
Liberal Democrats gain from Labour		Swing		

=== Reddish North ===
Reddish North
Party	Candidate	Votes	%	±%
Labour	Rachel Wise*	2,006	67.2	+14.0
Green	Helena Mellish	411	13.8	−10.1
Conservative	Annette Finnie	299	10.0	−5.0
Liberal Democrats	Ben Traynor	174	5.8	−3.0
Women's Equality	Paula King	94	3.2	−7.6
Majority		1,595	53.4	
Turnout		3,040	26.7	+2.4
Registered electors		11,372		
Labour hold		Swing		

=== Reddish South ===
Reddish South
Party	Candidate	Votes	%	±%
Green	James Frizzell	2,192	55.5	+4.3
Labour	Joanna Williams	1,449	36.7	−1.4
Conservative	John Bates	234	5.9	−1.0
Liberal Democrats	Susan Ingham	75	1.9	−0.8
Majority		743	18.8	
Turnout		3,978	35.2	+0.8
Registered electors		11,290		
Green hold		Swing		

== Changes 2024-2026 ==
=== By-elections ===
==== Bredbury Green & Romiley ====
By-election due to the resignation of councillor Lisa Smart.

Bredbury Green & Romiley: 17 October 2024
Party	Candidate	Votes	%	±%
Liberal Democrats	Rachel Bresnahan	1,506	65.8	+7.1
Conservative	Pat Bentley	552	24.1	+5.5
Labour	Papa Andoh-Kweku	127	5.5	–11.5
Green	Stephanie Wyatt	104	4.5	–1.2
Majority		954	41.7	+1.6
Turnout		2,302	21.5	–14.4
Registered electors		10,690		
Liberal Democrats hold		Swing	▲0.8	

==== Cheadle West & Gatley ====
By-election due to the resignation of councillor Tom Morrison.

Cheadle West & Gatley by-election: 17 October 2024
Party	Candidate	Votes	%	±%
Liberal Democrats	Huma Khan	1,159	45.1	–12.0
Conservative	Michael Fox	553	21.5	+7.3
Labour	Dan Farley	517	20.1	+0.5
Green	Alexander Drury	341	13.3	+4.3
Majority		606	23.6	–13.9
Turnout		2,579	22.0	–17.1
Registered electors		11,717		
Liberal Democrats hold		Swing	▼9.7	

==== Bramhall South and Woodford ====
By-election due to the resignation of councillor Ian Powney.

Bramhall South and Woodford by-election: 31 October 2024
Party	Candidate	Votes	%	±%
Conservative	Peter Crossen	1,909	47.9	+4.7
Liberal Democrats	Sandeep Singh Kashyap	1,733	43.5	–1.4
Reform	John Kelly	133	3.3	N/A
Labour	Jake Thomas	115	2.9	–4.1
Green	Andrew Dearden	95	2.4	–2.3
Majority		176	4.4	N/A
Turnout		3,989	37.0	–10.1
Registered electors		10,780		
Conservative gain from Liberal Democrats		Swing	▲3.1	
