= Marple North =

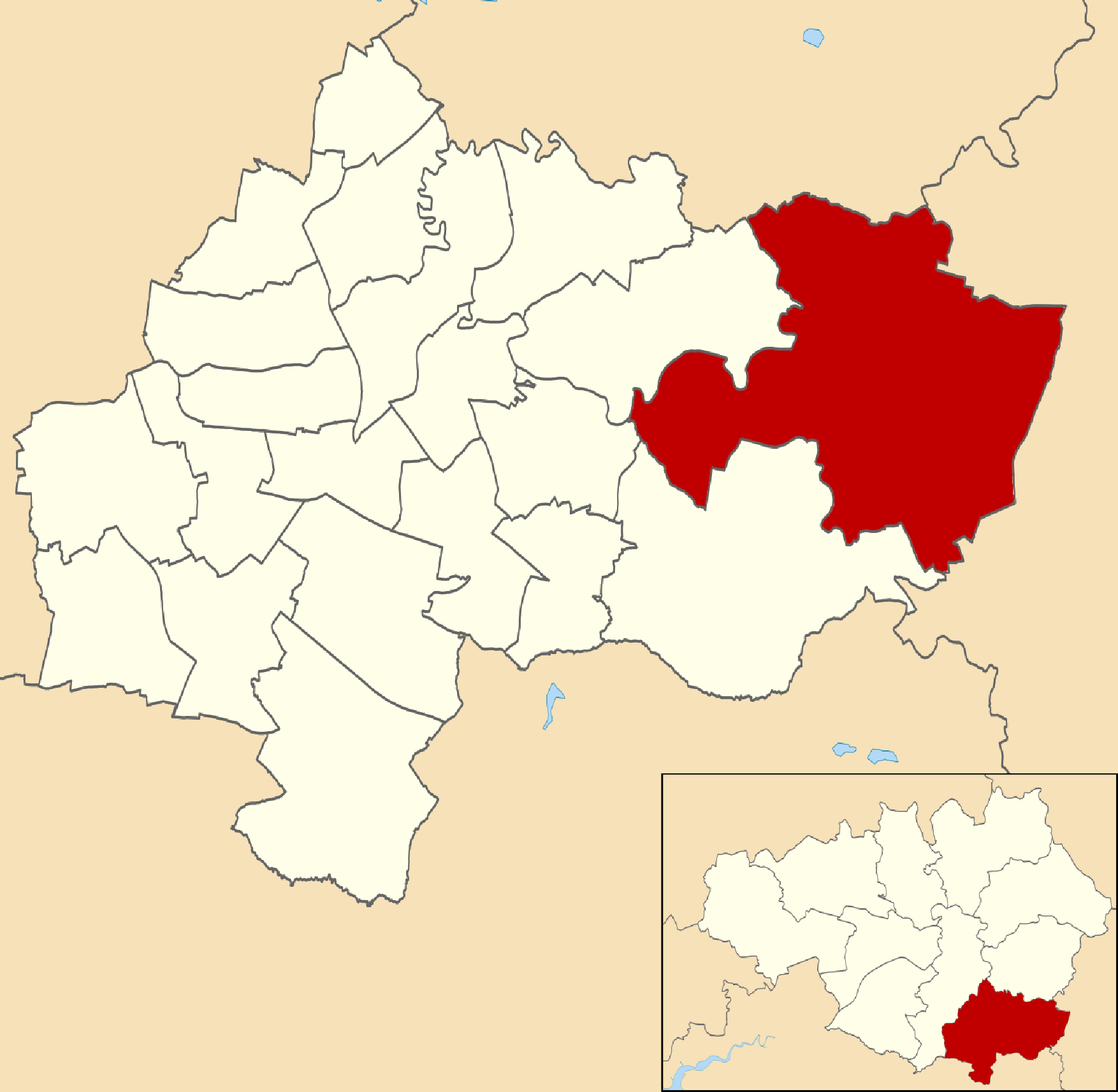
- Marple North within Stockport
- Population: 9,906 (2010)
- Country: England
- Sovereign state: United Kingdom
- UK Parliament: Hazel Grove
- Councillors: Steve Gribbon (Liberal Democrat); Micheala Meikle (Liberal Democrat); Megan Axon (Liberal Democrat)

Marple North is an electoral ward in the Metropolitan Borough of Stockport. It elects three Councillors to Stockport Metropolitan Borough Council using the first past the post electoral method, electing one Councillor every year without election on the fourth.

It covers the northern part of Marple and has two rail stations, both Marple Station and Rose Hill Marple. The ward also contains Brabyns Park as well as Etherow Country Park. Marple North was the seat of former Council Leader and former Cheadle MP Mark Hunter. Together with Bredbury & Woodley, Bredbury Green and Romiley, Hazel Grove, Manor, Marple South and Offerton, and part of Norbury & Woodsmoor, it constitutes the Hazel Grove Parliamentary constituency.

== Councillors ==
Marple North electoral ward is represented in Westminster by Lisa Smart MP for Hazel Grove.

The ward is represented on Stockport Council by three councillors: Steve Gribbon (Lib Dem), Micheala Meikle (Lib Dem) and Megan Axon (Lib Dem).

Election	Councillor	Councillor	Councillor
2004	Mark Hunter (Lib Dem)	Andrew Bispham (Lib Dem)	Martin Candler (Lib Dem)
2006	Craig Wright (Lib Dem)	Andrew Bispham (Lib Dem)	Martin Candler (Lib Dem)
2007	Craig Wright (Lib Dem)	Andrew Bispham (Lib Dem)	Martin Candler (Lib Dem)
2008	Craig Wright (Lib Dem)	Andrew Bispham (Lib Dem)	Martin Candler (Lib Dem)
2010	Craig Wright (Lib Dem)	Andrew Bispham (Lib Dem)	Martin Candler (Lib Dem)
2011	Craig Wright (Lib Dem)	Andrew Bispham (Lib Dem)	Martin Candler (Lib Dem)
2012	Craig Wright (Lib Dem)	Andrew Bispham (Lib Dem)	Martin Candler (Lib Dem)
2014	Geoff Abell (Lib Dem)	Andrew Bispham (Lib Dem)	Martin Candler (Lib Dem)
2015	Geoff Abell (Lib Dem)	Annette Finnie (Con)	Martin Candler (Lib Dem)
2016	Geoff Abell (Lib Dem)	Annette Finnie (Con)	Malcolm Allan (Lib Dem)
2018	Steve Gribbon (Lib Dem)	Annette Finnie (Con)	Malcolm Allan (Lib Dem)
2019	Steve Gribbon (Lib Dem)	Becky Senior (Lib Dem)	Malcolm Allan (Lib Dem)
2021	Steve Gribbon (Lib Dem)	Becky Senior (Lib Dem)	Malcolm Allan (Lib Dem)
2022	Steve Gribbon (Lib Dem)	Becky Senior (Lib Dem)	Malcolm Allan (Lib Dem)
2023	Steve Gribbon (Lib Dem)	Becky Senior (Lib Dem)	Geoff Abell (Lib Dem)
2024	Steve Gribbon (Lib Dem)	Michaela Meikle (Lib Dem)	Geoff Abell (Lib Dem)
2026	Steve Gribbon (Lib Dem)	Michaela Meikle (Lib Dem)	Megan Axon (Lib Dem)

indicates seat up for re-election.

== Elections in the 2020s ==
=== May 2026 ===
Marple North
Party	Candidate	Votes	%	±%
Liberal Democrats	Megan Axon	2,754	52.2	+2.5
Reform	Matthew Haydon Sharp	922	17.5	+17.5
Green	John Bright	694	13.2	+3.9
Conservative	Nigel Noble	590	11.2	−6.0
Labour	Peter Black	312	5.9	−9.9
Majority		1,832	34.7	
Liberal Democrats hold		Swing		

=== May 2024 ===
Marple North
Party	Candidate	Votes	%	±%
Liberal Democrats	Micheala Meikle	2,186	49.7	−7.1
Conservative	Nigel Noble	757	17.2	−0.4
Labour	Mike Hill	695	15.8	+3.1
Green	John Bright	407	9.3	−5.8
Independent	Steve Hatton	353	8.0	+1.5
Majority		1,429	32.5	
Turnout		4,426	46.7	+1.1
Registered electors		9,479		
Liberal Democrats hold		Swing		

=== May 2023 ===
Marple North (3)
Party	Candidate	Votes	%
Liberal Democrats	Steven Gribbon	2,752	63.2
Liberal Democrats	Geoff Abell	2,638	60.6
Liberal Democrats	Becky Senior	2,472	56.8
Conservative	Nigel Noble	766	17.6
Green	John Bright	658	15.1
Conservative	Joyce Ebbage	644	14.8
Conservative	Daniel Marchbank	613	14.1
Labour	Sandy Broadhurst	552	12.7
Labour	Craig Hamilton	430	9.9
Labour	Brian Wild	382	8.8
Independent	Steve Hatton	282	6.5
Rejected ballots		6	
Turnout		4,354	45.6
Total votes		12,189	
Registered electors		9,542	
Liberal Democrats win (new seat)			
Liberal Democrats win (new seat)			
Liberal Democrats win (new seat)			

=== May 2022 ===
Marple North
Party	Candidate	Votes	%	±%
Liberal Democrats	Stephen Gribbon*	2,624	56.4	+2
Conservative	Annette Finnie	1,023	22.0	−6
Labour	Claire Vibert	729	15.7	+5
Green	John Bright	267	5.7	−1
Majority		1,601	34.4	
Rejected ballots		10	0.2	
Turnout		4,653	48.0	−4
Registered electors		9,688		
Liberal Democrats hold		Swing		

=== May 2021 ===
Marple North
Party	Candidate	Votes	%	±%
Liberal Democrats	Malcolm Allan *	2,707	54	+3
Conservative	Annette Finnie	1,402	28	+7
Labour	Peter Towey	560	11	−7
Green	Carolyn Leather	366	7	−2
Majority		1,305		
Turnout		5,060	52	
Registered electors		9,766		
Liberal Democrats hold		Swing		

== Elections in the 2010s ==
=== May 2019 ===
2019
Party	Candidate	Votes	%	±%
Liberal Democrats	Becky Senior	2,225	51	
Conservative	Hannah Lesley Sneddon	940	21	
Labour	Claire Vibert	803	18	
Green	Carolyn Julie Leather	406	9	
Majority		1,285		
Turnout		4,374	46	
Liberal Democrats gain from Conservative		Swing		

=== May 2018 ===
2018
Party	Candidate	Votes	%	±%
Liberal Democrats	Steve Gribbon	2,213	48	
Conservative	Hannah Sneddon	1,115	24	
Labour	Chris Gleeson	810	18	
Green	Carolyn Leather	239	5	
Independent	Kevin Dowling	192	4	
Majority		1,098		
Turnout		4,569	47	
Liberal Democrats hold		Swing		

=== May 2016 ===
2016
Party	Candidate	Votes	%	±%
Liberal Democrats	Malcolm Allan	1,985	42	
Conservative	John Bates	1,393	29	
Labour	David Rowbottom	545	11	
UKIP	Ray Jones	316	7	
Independent	Kevin Dowling	315	7	
Green	Trevor Smith	207	4	
Majority		592		
Turnout		4,761	49	
Liberal Democrats hold		Swing		

=== May 2015 ===
2015
Party	Candidate	Votes	%	±%
Conservative	Annette Finnie	2,888	38	
Liberal Democrats	Andrew Bispham	2,550	34	
Labour	David Rowbottom	1,040	14	
UKIP	Ray Jones	609	8	
Green	Maggie Preston	506	7	
Majority		338		
Turnout		7,593	76	
Conservative gain from Liberal Democrats		Swing		

=== May 2014 ===
2014
Party	Candidate	Votes	%	±%
Liberal Democrats	Geoff Abell	1580	37%	−4.77%
Conservative	Annette Claire Finnie	1248	29%	+2.02%
UKIP	Chelsea Helen Smith	539	13%	+3.81%
Labour	David Edward Rowbottom	538	13%	−1.10%
Green	Maggie Preston	328	8%	+0.78%
Majority		332	8%	−6.79
Turnout		4233		
Liberal Democrats hold		Swing		

=== May 2012 ===
2012
Party	Candidate	Votes	%	±%
Liberal Democrats	Martin Candler	1,700	41.77	−9.48
Conservative	Annette Finnie	1,098	26.98	−8.62
Labour	David Rowbottom	574	14.10	+9.01
UKIP	Ray Jones	374	9.19	N/A
Green	Maggie Preston	294	7.22	−0.84
Independent	Barry Minshall	30	0.74	N/A
Majority		602	14.79	
Turnout		4,076	41.34	
Liberal Democrats hold		Swing		

=== May 2011 ===
2011
Party	Candidate	Votes	%	±%
Liberal Democrats	Andrew Bispham	2,061	40.0	
Conservative	Annette Finnie	1,680	32.6	
Labour	David Rowbottom	760	14.8	
Green	Maggie Preston	381	7.4	
UKIP	Ray Jones	253	4.5	
Majority		381		
Turnout		5,151	51.68	
Liberal Democrats hold		Swing		
