= Reddish South (ward, 2023–present) =

Electoral ward in the UK

- Population: 10,336 (2010)
- Country: England
- Sovereign state: United Kingdom
- UK Parliament: Denton and Reddish
- Councillors: James Frizzell (Green); Laura Smith (Green); Liz Crix (Green)

Reddish South is an electoral ward in the Metropolitan Borough of Stockport. It elects three councillors to Stockport Metropolitan Borough Council using the first past the post electoral method, electing one councillor every year without election on the fourth. However; in 2023 due to the boundary changes that year all three seats were up for election. The councillor that was elected but receaved the fewest number of votes would serve a 1 year term, the second place councillor a 2 year term and the councillor with the most vote a 3 year term.

It covers the southern part of Reddish, including parts of Heaton Norris and Heaton Chapel. Together with Reddish North it formed part of the Denton and Reddish Parliamentary Constituency.

== Councillors ==
Reddish South electoral ward is represented in Westminster by Navendu Mishra MP for Stockport.

The ward in Stockport is represented by three councillors: James Frizzell (Green), Gary Lawson (Green), and Liz Crix (Green).

Election	Councillor	Councillor	Councillor
2023	James Frizzell (Grn)	Gary Lawson (Grn)	Liz Crix (Grn)
2024	James Frizzell (Grn)	Gary Lawson (Grn)	Liz Crix (Grn)
2026	James Frizzell (Grn)	Laura Smith (Grn)	Liz Crix (Grn)

indicates seat up for re-election.

== Elections ==
=== May 2026 ===
Reddish South (3)
Party	Candidate	Votes	%	±%
Green	Laura Smith	2,515	54.2	+36.5
Reform	John Paul Jones	1,226	26.4	N/A
Labour	Papa Andoh-Kweku	540	11.6	−1.8
Conservative	Hassan Sajjad	192	4.1	−1.8
Liberal Democrats	Eileen V Campbell	164	3.5	+2.1
Majority		1,289	27.8	
Rejected ballots		19	0.4	-0.3
Turnout		4,637	40.9	+5.9
Total votes		4,656		
Registered electors		11,384		

=== May 2024 ===
Reddish South (3)
Party	Candidate	Votes	%	±%
Green	James Frizzell	2,192	55.5	+37.1
Labour	Joanna Williams	1,449	36.7	+23.3
Conservative	John Bates	234	5.9	+3.4
Liberal Democrats	Susan Ingham	75	1.9	+0.9
Majority		743	18.8	+13.8
Rejected ballots		28	0.7	
Turnout		3,950	35.0	+0.6
Total votes		3,978		
Registered electors		11,290		

=== May 2023 ===
Reddish South (3)
Party	Candidate	Votes	%	±%
Green	Liz Crix	2,174	20.1	
Green	Gary Lawson	2,042	18.9	
Green	James Frizzell	1,989	18.4	
Labour	Joanna Williams	1,481	13.4	
Labour	David White	1,453	13.4	
Labour	Paul Wright	1,195	11.0	
Conservative	John Bates	268	2.5	
Liberal Democrats	Megan Grant	104	1.0	
Liberal Democrats	Robert Richardson	71	0.7	
Liberal Democrats	June Somekh	54	0.5	
Majority				
Rejected ballots		19		
Turnout		3,885	34.4	
Total votes		10,831		
Registered electors		11,293		
