= Bredbury Green and Romiley =

Bredbury Green & Romiley
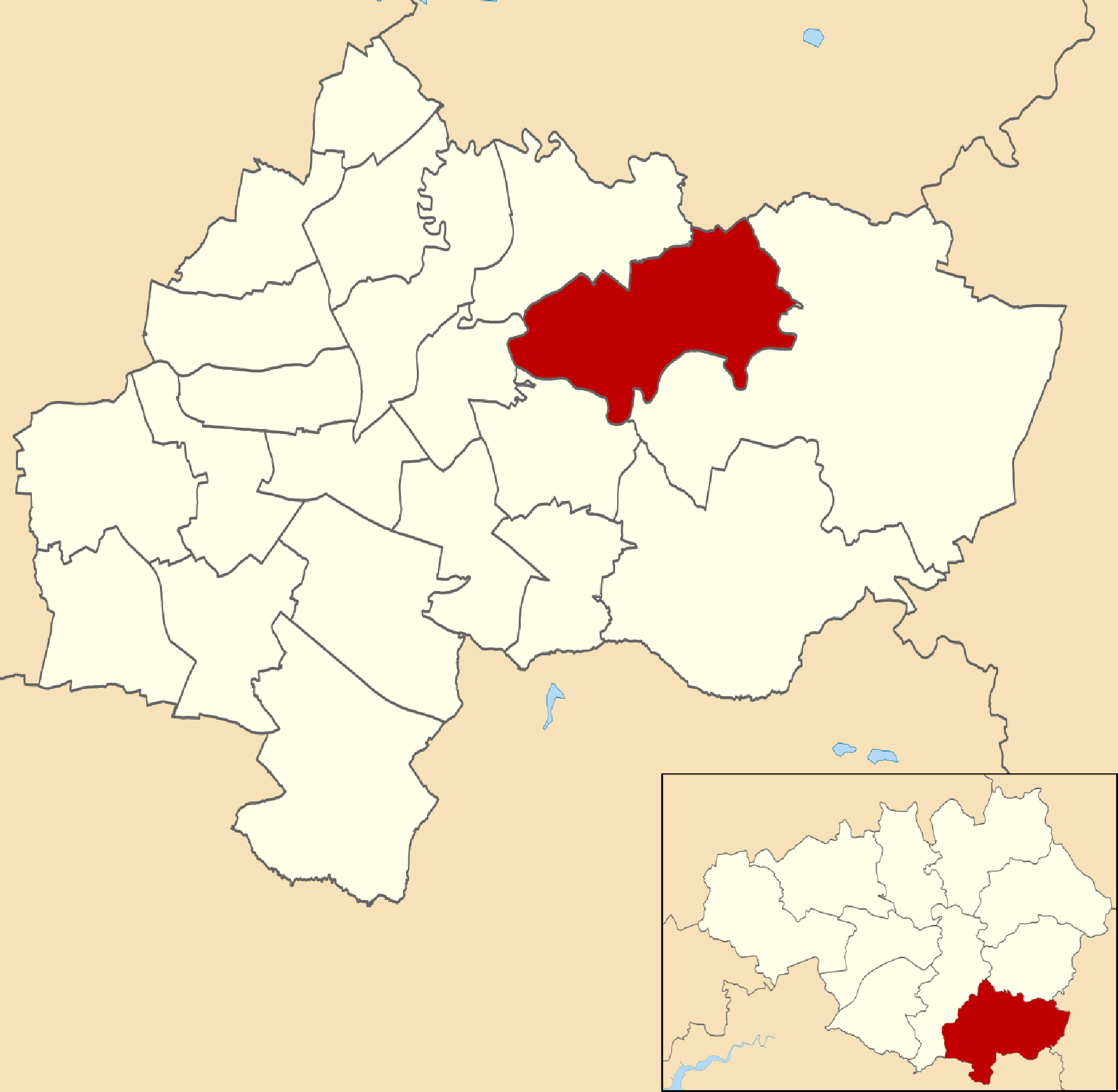
- Bredbury Green & Romiley within Stockport
- Population: 10,919 (2010)
- Country: England
- Sovereign state: United Kingdom
- UK Parliament: Hazel Grove
- Councillors: Angie Clark (Liberal Democrat); Mark Roberts (Liberal Democrat); Rachel Bresnahan (Liberal Democrat)

Bredbury Green & Romiley is an electoral ward in the Metropolitan Borough of Stockport.

Together with Bredbury & Woodley, Hazel Grove, Marple North, Marple South and Offerton it constitutes the Hazel Grove parliamentary constituency. The ward contains both Werneth School and Harrytown Catholic High School.

There were all up elections in Stockport in 2023, as a result of boundary changes by the Electoral Commission. Following the election of Lisa Smart to Parliament in July 2024, a by election was held in October 2024 with Rachel Bresnahan, a local youth worker, taking the seat for the Liberal Democrats.

== Councillors ==
Bredbury Green and Romiley electoral ward is represented in Westminster by Lisa Smart MP for Hazel Grove.

The ward is represented on Stockport Council by three councillors:

- Angie Clark (Lib Dem)
- Mark Roberts (Lib Dem)
- Rachel Bresnahan (Lib Dem)

Election	Councillor	Councillor	Councillor
2004	Brendan Jones (Lib Dem)	Margaret McLay (Lib Dem)	Hazel Lees (Lib Dem)
2006	Syd Lloyd (Con)	Margaret McLay (Lib Dem)	Hazel Lees (Lib Dem)
2007	Syd Lloyd (Con)	Margaret McLay (Lib Dem)	Hazel Lees (Lib Dem)
2008	Syd Lloyd (Con)	Margaret McLay (Lib Dem)	Hazel Lees (Lib Dem)
2010	Mags Kirkham (Lib Dem)	Margaret McLay (Lib Dem)	Hazel Lees (Lib Dem)
2011	Mags Kirkham (Lib Dem)	Syd Lloyd (Con)	Hazel Lees (Lib Dem)
2012	Mags Kirkham (Lib Dem)	Syd Lloyd (Con)	Hazel Lees (Lib Dem)
2014	Mags Kirkham (Lib Dem)	Syd Lloyd (Con)	Hazel Lees (Lib Dem)
2015	Mags Kirkham (Lib Dem)	Syd Lloyd (Con)	Hazel Lees (Lib Dem)
April 2016	Mags Kirkham (Ind)	Syd Lloyd (Con)	Hazel Lees (Lib Dem)
May 2016	Mags Kirkham (Ind)	Syd Lloyd (Con)	Lisa Smart (Lib Dem)
2018	Angie Clark (Lib Dem)	Syd Lloyd (Con)	Lisa Smart (Lib Dem)
2019	Angie Clark (Lib Dem)	Mark Roberts (Lib Dem)	Lisa Smart (Lib Dem)
2021	Angie Clark (Lib Dem)	Mark Roberts (Lib Dem)	Lisa Smart (Lib Dem)
2022	Angie Clark (Lib Dem)	Mark Roberts (Lib Dem)	Lisa Smart (Lib Dem)
2023	Angie Clark (Lib Dem)	Mark Roberts (Lib Dem)	Lisa Smart (Lib Dem)
2024	Angie Clark (Lib Dem)	Mark Roberts (Lib Dem)	Lisa Smart (Lib Dem)
Oct 2024	Angie Clark (Lib Dem)	Mark Roberts (Lib Dem)	Rachel Bresnahan (Lib Dem)

indicates seat up for re-election. indicates councillor defected.

== Elections in 2020s ==
=== Oct 2024 ===
Oct 2024
Party	Candidate	Votes	%	±%
Liberal Democrats	Rachel Bresnahan	1,506	65.8	+7.1
Conservative	Pat Bentley	552	24.1	+5.5
Labour	Papa Andoh-Kweku	127	5.5	−11.5
Green	Stephanie Wyatt	104	4.5	−1.2
Majority		954	41.7	
Turnout		2,289	21.5	
Liberal Democrats hold		Swing		

=== May 2024 ===
2024
Party	Candidate	Votes	%	±%
Liberal Democrats	Mark Roberts	2,192	58.7	
Conservative	Pat Bentley	695	18.6	
Labour	Peter Black	634	17	
Green	Stephanie Wyatt	213	5.7	
Majority		1,497	40.1	
Turnout		3734	35.9	
Liberal Democrats hold		Swing		

=== May 2023 ===
Bredbury Green & Romiley (3)
Party	Candidate	Votes	%
Liberal Democrats	Lisa Smart	2,301	64.3
Liberal Democrats	Angie Clark	2,239	62.6
Liberal Democrats	Mark Roberts	2,048	57.2
Conservative	Pat Bentley	607	17.0
Conservative	Jane Cannon	563	15.7
Conservative	Maureen Walsh	559	15.6
Labour	Peter Black	488	13.6
Labour	David Colman	439	12.3
Labour	Susan Colman	399	11.1
Green	Stephanie Wyatt	319	8.9
Rejected ballots		13	
Turnout		3,579	34.0
Total votes		9,962	
Registered electors		10,535	
Liberal Democrats win (new seat)			
Liberal Democrats win (new seat)			
Liberal Democrats win (new seat)			

=== May 2022 ===
2022
Party	Candidate	Votes	%	±%
Liberal Democrats	Angie Clark	2,299	59.4	+2.4
Conservative	Sally Bennett	943	24.4	−2.6
Labour	Rachel Wise	472	12.2	−0.2
Green	Lucy Mary Priest	213	4	0
Majority		1,356	35	
Turnout		3870	35.2	
Liberal Democrats hold		Swing		

=== May 2021 ===
2021
Party	Candidate	Votes	%	±%
Liberal Democrats	Lisa Smart	2,366	56.6	−3
Conservative	Richard David Ellis	1,144	27.4	+7.5
Labour	Rachel Wise	490	11.7	−1.8
Green	Alex Louise Crompton	182	4.4	−2.6
Majority		1,222	29.8	+0.1
Turnout		4,182	38.0	
Liberal Democrats hold		Swing		

== Elections in 2010s ==
=== May 2019 ===
2019
Party	Candidate	Votes	%	±%
Liberal Democrats	Mark Roberts	2,123	60	
Conservative	Sally Bennett	710	20	
Labour	Peter Black	480	13	
Green	Camilla Helen Luff	248	7	
Majority		1,413		
Turnout		3,561	33	
Liberal Democrats gain from Conservative		Swing		

=== May 2018 ===
2018
Party	Candidate	Votes	%	±%
Liberal Democrats	Angie Clark	2,014	51	
Conservative	Nicki Baines	1,130	29	
Labour	Laura Clingan	625	16	
Green	Trevor Smith	142	4	
Majority		884		
Turnout		3,911	35	
Liberal Democrats gain from Independent		Swing		

=== May 2016 ===
2016
Party	Candidate	Votes	%	±%
Liberal Democrats	Lisa Smart	2,284	51	
Conservative	Sally Bennett	1,442	32	
Labour	Brian Wild	602	13	
Green	Gavin Pate	151	3	
Majority		842		
Turnout		4,479	41	
Liberal Democrats hold		Swing		

=== May 2015 ===
2015
Party	Candidate	Votes	%	±%
Conservative	Syd Lloyd	2,481	34	
Liberal Democrats	Natalie Bird	2,067	29	
Labour	Phillip Bray	1,391	19	
UKIP	Brian Stanyer	1,066	15	
Green	Chris Gibbins	243	3	
Majority		414		
Turnout		7,248	66	
Conservative hold		Swing		

=== May 2014 ===
Mags Kirkham left the Lib Dems in April 2016 to become an Independent politician.

2014
Party	Candidate	Votes	%	±%
Liberal Democrats	Mags Kirkham*	1,350	33%	−8.14%
Conservative	Sally Bennett	1173	29%	−5.37
UKIP	Brian Stanyer	784	19%	N/A
Labour	Brian Anthony Wild	713	17%	−3.39%
BNP	Tony Dean	60	1%	−3.10%
Majority		177	4%	
Turnout		4080		
Liberal Democrats hold		Swing		

=== May 2012 ===
2012
Party	Candidate	Votes	%	±%
Liberal Democrats	Hazel Lees	1,594	41.14	−6.82
Conservative	Sally Bennett	1,332	34.37	−10.94
Labour	Kathryn Priestley	790	20.39	+13.66
BNP	Tony Dean	159	4.10	N/A
Majority		262	6.76	
Turnout		3,888	35.62	
Liberal Democrats hold		Swing		

=== May 2011 ===
2011
Party	Candidate	Votes	%	±%
Conservative	Syd Lloyd	2,238	46.7	
Liberal Democrats	Margaret McLay	1,580	33.0	
Labour	David Sedgwick	970	20.3	
Majority		658		
Turnout		4,788	43.68	
Conservative gain from Liberal Democrats		Swing		
