= Edgeley and Cheadle Heath =

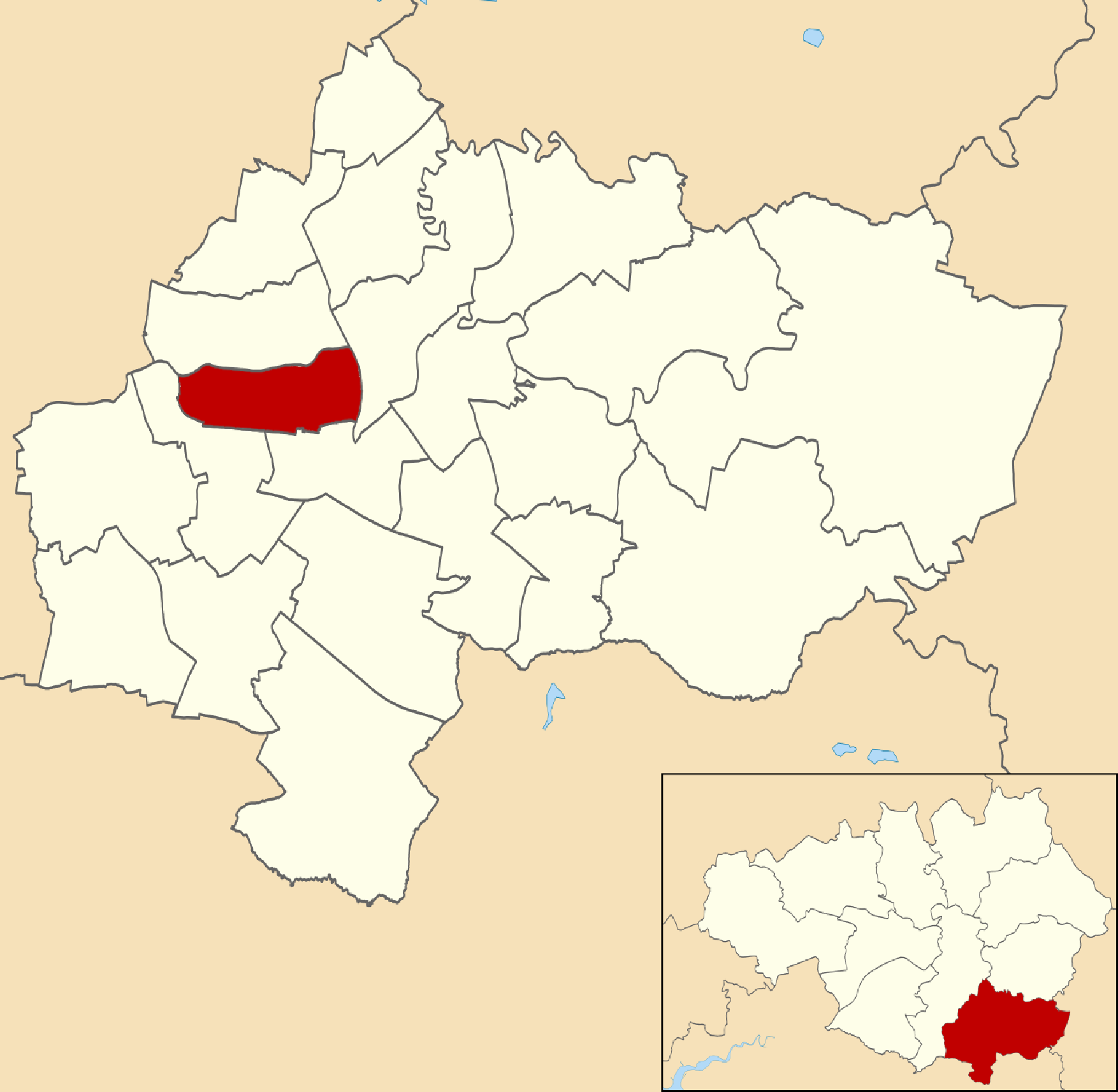
- Edgeley and Cheadle Heath within Stockport
- Population: 10,664 (2010)
- Country: England
- Sovereign state: United Kingdom
- UK Parliament: Stockport
- Councillors: Louise Heywood (Labour); Matt Wynne (Independent); Georgia Lynott (Labour)

Edgeley and Cheadle Heath is an electoral ward in the Metropolitan Borough of Stockport. It was established in 2004 by The Borough of Stockport (Electoral Changes) Order 2004. It elects three Councillors to Stockport Metropolitan Borough Council using the first past the post electoral method, electing one Councillor every year without an election on the fourth.

Together with Brinnington & Central, Davenport and Cale Green, Heatons North, Heatons South and Manor, the ward lies in the Stockport Parliamentary Constituency. At the border of the ward with Brinnington & Central lies Stockport Station, formerly known as Edgeley Station. The ward also contains Stockport Academy, formerly Avondale High School.

== Councillors ==
Edgeley and Cheadle Heath electoral ward is represented in Westminster by Navendu Mishra MP for Stockport.

The ward is represented on Stockport Council by three councillors:

- Louise Heywood (Lab)
- Matt Wynne (Ind)
- Georgia Lynott (Lab)

Matt Wynne was elected as a Labour candidate for the 2019 election. However on 6 October 2022 he quit the Labour party after they deemed him unfit to stand for the 2023 election. He is currently an independent councillor.

Election	Councillor	Councillor	Councillor
2004	Philip Harding (Lab)	Richard Coaton (Lab)	Sheila Bailey (Lab)
2006	Philip Harding (Lab)	Richard Coaton (Lab)	Sheila Bailey (Lab)
2007	Philip Harding (Lab)	Richard Coaton (Lab)	Sheila Bailey (Lab)
2008	Philip Harding (Lab)	Richard Coaton (Lab)	Sheila Bailey (Lab)
2010	Philip Harding (Lab)	Richard Coaton (Lab)	Sheila Bailey (Lab)
2011	Philip Harding (Lab)	Richard Coaton (Lab)	Sheila Bailey (Lab)
2012	Philip Harding (Lab)	Richard Coaton (Lab)	Sheila Bailey (Lab)
2014	Philip Harding (Lab)	Richard Coaton (Lab)	Sheila Bailey (Lab)
2015	Philip Harding (Lab)	Richard Coaton (Lab)	Sheila Bailey (Lab)
2016	Philip Harding (Lab)	Richard Coaton (Lab)	Sheila Bailey (Lab)
2018	Philip Harding (Lab)	Richard Coaton (Lab)	Sheila Bailey (Lab)
2019	Philip Harding (Lab)	Matt Wynne (Lab)	Sheila Bailey (Lab)
2021	Philip Harding (Lab)	Matt Wynne (Lab)	Sheila Bailey (Lab)
2022	Louise Heywood (Lab)	Matt Wynne (Lab)	Sheila Bailey (Lab)
2022	Louise Heywood (Lab)	Matt Wynne (Ind.)	Georgia Lynott (Lab)

indicates seat up for re-election.

== Elections in the 2020s ==
=== October 2022 ===
2022
Party	Candidate	Votes	%	±%
Labour	Georgia Lynott	1,172	52.98	−19.51
Liberal Democrats	Robbie Cowbury	840	37.98	+32.04
Green	Philip Handscomb	200	9.04	+0.49
Majority		332	15.01	−44.46
Turnout		2212	20.82	−12.64
Labour hold		Swing		

=== May 2022 ===
2022
Party	Candidate	Votes	%	±%
Labour	Louise Heywood	2,172	71.80	
Conservative	Karl Seppman	309	10.22	
Liberal Democrats	Tracey Whitmore	250	8.27	
Green	Shaughan Rick	234	7.74	
Reform	Lynn Schofield	60	1.98	
Majority		1863	61.59	
Turnout		3025	28.69	
Labour hold		Swing		

=== May 2021 ===
2021
Party	Candidate	Votes	%	±%
Labour	Sheila Bailey	2,561	72.49	
Conservative	Richard Walsh	460	13.02	
Green	Shaughan Rick	302	8.55	
Liberal Democrats	Tracey Whitmore	210	5.94	
Majority		2101	59.47	
Turnout		3533	33.46	
Labour hold		Swing		

== Elections in the 2010s ==
=== May 2019 ===
2019
Party	Candidate	Votes	%	±%
Labour	Matt Wynne	1,797	62.72	
UKIP	Peter Gerald Behan	327	11.41	
Green	Shaughan James Rick	286	9.98	
Conservative	Richard Philip Walsh	256	8.94	
Liberal Democrats	Oliver John Harrison	199	6.95	
Majority		1,470	51.31	
Turnout		2,865	27.37	
Labour hold		Swing		

=== May 2018 ===
2018
Party	Candidate	Votes	%	±%
Labour	Philip Harding	1,709	73.86	
Liberal Democrats	Oliver Harrison	203	8.77	
Conservative	Pat Leck	187	8.08	
Green	Camilla Luff	144	6.22	
UKIP	Peter Behan	71	3.07	
Majority		1,506	65.08	
Turnout		2,314	21.87	
Labour hold		Swing		

On 17 April 2018, Stockport Council published a notice to confirm that due to the death of the Conservative candidate Maureen Baldwin-Moore the scheduled election for this ward would no longer take place on 3 May 2018, and that a new poll would take place on 24 May 2018. Under the Electoral Administration Act, the Conservatives were allowed to select a replacement candidate, but new nominations by other parties were not permitted.

=== May 2016 ===
2016
Party	Candidate	Votes	%	±%
Labour	Sheila Bailey	2,214	68.14	
UKIP	Peter Behan	393	12.10	
Conservative	Maureen Baldwin-Moore	252	7.76	
Green	Gordon Combe	198	6.09	
Liberal Democrats	Claire Halliwell	192	5.91	
Majority		1,821	56.05	
Turnout		3,249	31.31	
Labour hold		Swing		

=== May 2015 ===
2015
Party	Candidate	Votes	%	±%
Labour	Richard Coaton	3,466	55	
Conservative	Alex Kenyon	945	15	
UKIP	Chelsea Smith	857	14	
Liberal Democrats	Danny Langley	549	9	
Green	Camilla Luff	506	8	
Majority		2,521		
Turnout		6,323	59	
Labour hold		Swing		

=== May 2014 ===
2014
Party	Candidate	Votes	%	±%
Labour	Philip Harding	1,884	58%	−16.59%
UKIP	Chris Pamp	579	18%	N/A
Green	Camilla Luff	297	9%	+1.66%
Conservative	Morag White	267	8%	−1.61%
Liberal Democrats	Danny Langley	240	7%	−1.46%
Majority		1,305	40%	−25%
Turnout		3267		
Labour hold		Swing		

=== May 2012 ===
2012
Party	Candidate	Votes	%	±%
Labour	Sheila Bailey	2,205	74.59	+27.90
Conservative	Christine Holgate	284	9.61	−5.91
Liberal Democrats	Alan Livingstone	250	8.46	−22.91
Green	Camilla Luff	217	7.34	+0.92
Majority		1,921	65.00	
Turnout		2,968	27.83	
Labour hold		Swing		

=== May 2011 ===
2011
Party	Candidate	Votes	%	±%
Labour	Richard Coaton	2,428	66.4	
Conservative	Chris Holgate	547	14.9	
Liberal Democrats	Danny Langley	406	11.1	
Green	Andrew Knighton	256	7.0	
Majority		1,881		
Turnout		3,659	34.36	
Labour hold		Swing		
