= 2026 Stockport Metropolitan Borough Council election =

2026 English local government election

- 7 May 2026

21 out of 63 seats to Stockport Metropolitan Borough Council 32 seats needed for a majority
- Registered: 226,799
- Turnout: 99,697; 44.0%

	First party	Second party	Third party
Leader	Mark Roberts	Christine Carrigan	Gary Lawson
Party	Liberal Democrats	Labour	Green
Last election	31 seats, 34.2%	22 seats, 31.7%	3 seats, 10.9%
Seats before	30	19	3
Seats won	13	2	2
Seats after	33	15	4
Seat change	▲3	▼4	▲1
Popular vote	32,050	12,831	16,788
Percentage	32.2%	12.9%	16.9%
Swing	▼2.0%	▼18.8%	▲6.0%
	Fourth party	Fifth party	Sixth party
Leader		Anna Charles-Jones	Matt Wynne
Party	Independent	Heald Green Ratepayers	Community Association
Last election	1 seat, 0.4%	3 seats, 2.2%	3 seats, 2.2%
Seats before	4	3	3
Seats won	0	1	1
Seats after	3	3	3
Seat change	▼1	Steady	Steady
Popular vote	0	1,780	1,770
Percentage	0	1.8%	1.8
Swing		▼0.4%	▼0.4%
	Seventh party	Eighth party
Party	Reform	Conservative
Last election	0 seats	0 seats, 16.7%
Seats before	0	1
Seats won	2	0
Seats after	2	1
Seat change	▲2	Steady
Popular vote	24,498	9,576
Percentage	24.6%	9.6%
Swing	▲24.6%	▼7.1%
- Results by Ward
Leader before election
Mark Roberts
Liberal Democrats
No overall control (Note: Liberal Democrat minority.)
Leader after election
Mark Roberts
Liberal Democrats

The 2026 Stockport Metropolitan Borough Council election took place on Thursday 7 May 2026, alongside other local elections in the United Kingdom. One third of the 63 members of Stockport Metropolitan Borough Council in Greater Manchester were elected.

Prior to the election, the council was under no overall control. The Liberal Democrats were the largest party and ran the council as a minority administration. At this election the party gained three extra seats, giving them an overall majority on the council.

== Council composition ==
After 2024 election		Before 2026 election	
Party	Seats	Party	Seats
Liberal Democrats	31	Liberal Democrats	30
Labour	22	Labour	19
Community Association	3 (Note: Sit as part of the Stockport Community Group.)	Community Association	3
Green	3	Green	3
Heald Green Ratepayers	3	Heald Green Ratepayers	3
Conservative	0	Conservative	1
Independent	1	Independent	4

Changes 2024–2026:

- August 2024: Aron Thornley (Independent) joins Labour
- September 2024: Tom Morrison (Liberal Democrats), Ian Powney (Liberal Democrats), and Lisa Smart (Liberal Democrats) resign – by-elections held October 2024
- October 2024: Rachel Bresnahan (Liberal Democrats) and Huma Khan (Liberal Democrats) hold by-elections, and Peter Crossen (Conservative) gains by-election from Liberal Democrats
- February 2025: Holly McCormack (Labour) and David Sedgwick (Labour) suspended from party
- September 2025: Joe Barratt (Labour) and Rosemary Barratt (Labour) leave party to sit as independents (Note: Sit as part of the Bredbury and Woodley Independents group.)

== Summary ==
=== Background ===
Stockport Metropolitan Borough Council was created in 1974. The Conservatives saw early success, controlling the council as a majority from its creation until 1983. 1988 saw the what was then the SLD become the largest party; since then council control has been contested between the Liberal Democrats and Labour. The Liberal Democrats formed their first majority administration in 1999 after a decade of no overall control, which lasted until 2011. The first Labour-led administration was formed in 2016 as a minority. The Liberal Democrats again became the largest group in 2021, but it was not until 2022 that they formed a minority administration.

A new set of ward boundaries was used for the 2023 election. As such, this election will be for the councillors elected with the second highest number of votes in each of the 21 three-member wards. The Liberal Democrats will be defending 11 seats, Labour will be defending 7, and the Greens, Heald Green Ratepayers, and Edgeley Community Association will be defending 1 each.

=== Election result ===
2026 Stockport Metropolitan Borough Council election
Party	This election				Full council			This election		
Party	Candidates	Seats	Net	Seats %	Other	Total	Total %	Votes	Votes %	+/−
Liberal Democrats	{{{candidates}}}	13	▲2	61.9	20	33	52.4	32,050	32.2	–2.0
Labour	{{{candidates}}}	2	▼4	9.6	12	14	22.2	12,831	12.9	–18.8
Green	{{{candidates}}}	2	▲1	9.6	2	4	6.3	16,788	16.9	+6.0
Independent	{{{candidates}}}	0	▼1	0.0	3	3	4.8	N/A (Note: Did not stand candidates.)	N/A	–0.4
Heald Green Ratepayers	{{{candidates}}}	1	Steady	4.8	2	3	4.8	1,780	1.8	–0.4
Community Association	{{{candidates}}}	1	Steady	4.8	2	3	4.8	1,770	1.8	–0.4
Reform	{{{candidates}}}	2	▲2	9.6	0	2	3.2	24,498	24.6	+24.6
Conservative	{{{candidates}}}	0	Steady	0.0	1	1	1.6	9,576	9.6	–7.1
Party of Women	{{{candidates}}}	0	Steady	0.0	0	0	0.0	47		
TUSC	{{{candidates}}}	0	Steady	0.0	0	0	0.0	64		
Your Party	{{{candidates}}}	0	Steady	0.0	0	0	0.0	54		

== Incumbent ==
Ward	Incumbent councillor	Party	Re-standing
Bramhall North	Suzanne Wyatt	Liberal Democrats	No
Bramhall South & Woodford	Dallas Jones	Liberal Democrats	Yes
Bredbury & Woodley	Sue Thorpe	Liberal Democrats	No
Bredbury Green & Romiley	Angie Clark	Liberal Democrats	Yes
Brinnington & Stockport Central	Kerry Waters	Labour	No
Cheadle East & Cheadle; Hulme North	Jilly Julian	Liberal Democrats	Yes
Cheadle Hulme South	Helen Foster-Grime	Liberal Democrats	Yes
Cheadle West & Gatley	Ian Hunter	Liberal Democrats	Yes
Davenport & Cale Green	Wendy Wild	Labour	Yes
Edgeley	Leah Taylor	Community Association	No
Hazel Grove	Wendy Meikle	Liberal Democrats	Yes
Heald Green	Anna Charles-Jones	Ratepayers	Yes
Heatons North	John Taylor	Labour	No
Heatons South	Dean Fitzpatrick	Labour	Yes
Manor	Sue Glithero	Labour	Yes
Marple North	Geoff Abell	Liberal Democrats	No
Marple South & High Lane	Aron Thornley (Note: Originally elected as a Liberal Democrat, but left the party to sit as an independent. He joined Labour in August 2024.)	Labour	No
Norbury & Woodsmoor	Dominic Hardwick	Liberal Democrats	Yes
Offerton	Helen Hibbert	Labour	Yes
Reddish North	Holly McCormack (Note: Originally elected as Labour, but was suspended from the party in February 2025 and now sits as an independent.)	Independent	No
Reddish South	Gary Lawson	Green	No

== Ward results ==
=== Bramhall North ===
Bramhall North
Party	Candidate	Votes	%	±%
Liberal Democrats	Taya Clarke	2,188	45.4	−2.4
Reform	Rajinder Singh	1,146	23.8	N/A
Conservative	Archana Prasad	804	16.7	−19.5
Green	Nathaniel Butler	483	10.0	+3.8
Labour	Jake Thomas	200	4.1	−5.6
Majority		1,042	21.6	
Turnout		4,828	48.9	+5.2
Registered electors		9,874		
Liberal Democrats hold		Swing		

=== Bramhall South & Woodford ===
Bramhall South & Woodford
Party	Candidate	Votes	%	±%
Liberal Democrats	Dallas Jones*	2,417	41.4	−3.5
Conservative	Ste Mulvenna	2,114	36.2	−7.0
Reform	Stephen Speakman	776	13.3	N/A
Green	Thomas Price	393	6.7	+2.0
Labour	Phil Matley	134	2.3	−4.7
Majority		303	5.2	
Turnout		5,840	53.5	+6.4
Registered electors		10,915		
Liberal Democrats hold		Swing		

=== Bredbury & Woodley ===
Bredbury & Woodley
Party	Candidate	Votes	%	±%
Liberal Democrats	Niki Meerman	2,013	43.3	+9.1
Reform	Mark Kelly	1,734	37.3	N/A
Green	Charlotte Allen	408	8.8	+4.0
Labour	Charlie Stewart	252	5.4	−42.0
Conservative	William Law	246	5.3	−8.2
Majority		279	6.0	
Turnout		4,666	42.4	+8.0
Registered electors		11,011		
Liberal Democrats gain from Labour		Swing		

=== Bredbury Green & Romiley ===
Bredbury Green & Romiley
Party	Candidate	Votes	%	±%
Liberal Democrats	Angie Clark*	2,097	45.6	−12.1
Reform	Stuart Reeves	1,362	29.6	N/A
Green	Lady Simon of Wythenshawe	475	10.3	+4.6
Conservative	Pat Bentley	430	9.3	−9.3
Labour	Aron Thornley	239	5.2	−11.8
Majority		735	16.0	
Turnout		4,613	43.5	+7.6
Registered electors		10,611		
Liberal Democrats hold		Swing		

=== Brinnington & Stockport Central ===
Brinnington & Stockport Central
Party	Candidate	Votes	%	±%
Reform	Shaun Regan	843	30.8	N/A
Labour	Callum Walmsley	784	28.6	−32.4
Green	Eli King	662	24.2	+12.2
Liberal Democrats	Douglas Greenhalgh	297	10.8	−3.6
Conservative	Ros Lloyd	120	4.4	−8.1
TUSC	Adil Shaikh	32	1.2	N/A
Majority		59	2.2	
Turnout		2,749	28.1	+8.5
Registered electors		9,797		
Reform gain from Labour		Swing		

=== Cheadle East & Cheadle Hulme North ===
Cheadle East & Cheadle Hulme North
Party	Candidate	Votes	%	±%
Liberal Democrats	Jilly Julian*	2,105	44.0	−0.7
Reform	Stacey Knighton	1,291	27.0	N/A
Green	Thomas Longden	632	13.2	+7.0
Labour	Yvonne Guariento	530	11.1	−29.3
Conservative	Naveed Khan	221	4.6	−4.0
Majority		814	17.0	
Turnout		4,793	40.9	+3.1
Registered electors		11,705		
Liberal Democrats hold		Swing		

=== Cheadle Hulme South ===
Cheadle Hulme South
Party	Candidate	Votes	%	±%
Liberal Democrats	Helen Foster-Grime*	3,026	56.0	−0.2
Reform	Richard Bloor	1071	19.8	N/A
Green	Peter Atkinson	544	10.1	+1.8
Conservative	Daniel Yacoubian	492	9.1	−8.6
Labour	Barry Hawkins	274	5.1	−12.3
Majority		1,955	36.2	−1.7
Turnout		5,415	45.6	+5.7
Registered electors		11,871		
Liberal Democrats hold		Swing		

=== Cheadle West & Gatley ===
Cheadle West & Gatley
Party	Candidate	Votes	%	±%
Liberal Democrats	Ian Hunter*	2,299	46.2	−14.9
Reform	Denise Fletcher	971	19.5	N/A
Green	Stephanie Wyatt	709	14.2	+5.2
Conservative	Penny Davis	650	13.1	−1.1
Labour	Carl Carrigan	349	7.0	−12.6
Majority		1,328	26.7	−10.8
Turnout		4,991	43.1	+4.0
Registered electors		11,570		
Liberal Democrats hold		Swing		

=== Davenport & Cale Green ===
Davenport & Cale Green
Party	Candidate	Votes	%	±%
Liberal Democrats	Alice Delemare	1,323	28.1	+12.8
Labour	Wendy Wild*	1,081	22.9	−30.8
Reform	Alan Livingstone	1,063	22.6	+14.7
Green	Andrew Glassford	954	20.2	+8.3
Conservative	Nathan Lumb	191	4.1	−3.3
Your Party	Ashley Walker	54	1.1	N/A
Party of Women	Tara Hughes	47	1.0	−2.9
Majority		242	5.2	
Turnout		4,720	39.7	+8.6
Registered electors		11,903		
Liberal Democrats gain from Labour		Swing		

=== Edgeley ===
Edgeley
Party	Candidate	Votes	%	±%
Community Association	Jess Meller	1,770	46.3	−13.0
Reform	Peter Marsh	731	19.1	N/A
Green	Will York	666	17.4	+11.4
Labour	Mike Naylor	419	11.0	−17.7
Liberal Democrats	Robbie Cowbury	151	3.9	+0.9
Conservative	Stephen Wear	88	2.3	−0.6
Majority		1,039	27.2	−3.4
Turnout		3,840	41.7	+8.4
Registered electors		9,209		
Community Association hold		Swing		

=== Hazel Grove ===
Hazel Grove
Party	Candidate	Votes	%	±%
Liberal Democrats	Wendy Meikle*	1,742	37.7	−4.4
Reform	John Kelly	1,662	35.7	N/A
Conservative	Tim Morley	524	11.2	−14.7
Green	Dave Shearman	470	10.1	−1.0
Labour	Johnny White	261	5.6	−15.3
Majority		80	1.7	−14.5
Turnout		4,669	43.7	+8.4
Registered electors		10,683		
Liberal Democrats hold		Swing		

=== Heald Green ===
Heald Green
Party	Candidate	Votes	%	±%
Heald Green Ratepayers	Anna Charles-Jones*	1,780	35.8	−7.5
Liberal Democrats	Nasser Shaikh	1,372	27.6	−0.1
Reform	Carl McCabe	972	19.2	N/A
Green	Emma McCarthy	434	8.7	+3.9
Conservative	Minara Cook	222	4.5	−4.8
Labour	Kath Priestley	196	3.9	−11.3
Majority		408	8.2	−7.4
Turnout		4,983	43.8	+6.3
Registered electors		11,364		
Heald Green Ratepayers hold		Swing		

=== Heatons North ===
Heatons North
Party	Candidate	Votes	%	±%
Labour	Jo Williams	1,743	33.6	−28.5
Green	Helena Mellish	1,613	31.1	+12.7
Reform	John Wilson	840	16.2	N/A
Conservative	Timothy Cho	584	11.3	−1.3
Liberal Democrats	Alex Hartley	409	7.9	+1.0
Majority		130	2.5	−41.2
Turnout		5,200	47.0	+5.8
Registered electors		11,074		
Labour hold		Swing		

=== Heatons South ===
Heatons South
Party	Candidate	Votes	%	±%
Labour	Dean Fitzpatrick*	2,138	40.7	−23.7
Green	Jake Welsh	1276	24.3	+8.4
Reform	Mark Wilkinson	950	18.1	N/A
Conservative	Joel Tennuchi	460	8.8	−2.0
Liberal Democrats	Marcel Ridyard	391	7.5	−1.8
TUSC	Libby Williams	32	0.6	N/A
Majority		862	16.4	−31.8
Turnout		5,262	47.4	+7.0
Registered electors		11,098		
Labour hold		Swing		

=== Manor ===
Manor
Party	Candidate	Votes	%	±%
Reform	Brian Battle	1,521	36.2	+26.9
Labour	Sue Glithero*	1,003	23.9	−28.4
Liberal Democrats	Jason Jones	893	21.3	−4.4
Green	Daniel Brown	633	15.1	+8.9
Conservative	John Bates	147	3.5	−2.9
Majority		518	12.3	
Turnout		4,213	41.1	+11.1
Registered electors		10,249		
Reform gain from Labour		Swing		

=== Marple North ===
Marple North
Party	Candidate	Votes	%	±%
Liberal Democrats	Megan Axon	2,754	52.2	+2.5
Reform	Matthew Sharp	922	17.5	N/A
Green	John Bright	694	13.2	+3.9
Conservative	Nigel Noble	590	11.2	−6.0
Labour	Peter Black	312	5.9	−9.9
Majority		1,832	34.7	+2.2
Turnout		5,279	54.7	+8.0
Registered electors		9,652		
Liberal Democrats hold		Swing		

To note: No Independent candidate this election, -8.0% vote share on 2024 result.

=== Marple South & High Lane ===
Marple South & High Lane
Party	Candidate	Votes	%	±%
Liberal Democrats	Dominic Warner	2,267	47.3	−7.6
Reform	Carl Rydings	1,214	25.3	N/A
Green	Rebecca Hurst	593	12.4	+2.0
Conservative	Annette Finnie	507	10.6	−9.5
Labour	Brian Wild	214	4.5	−10.2
Majority		1,053	22.0	
Turnout		4,806	48.6	+9.1
Registered electors		9,881		
Liberal Democrats hold		Swing		

=== Norbury & Woodsmoor ===
Norbury & Woodsmoor
Party	Candidate	Votes	%	±%
Liberal Democrats	Dominic Hardwick*	2,227	45.3	+2.4
Reform	Oliver Speakman	1,276	25.9	N/A
Conservative	John Wright	575	11.7	−20.2
Green	Jessica Hett	546	11.1	+6.9
Labour	Colin Devine	295	6.0	−9.4
Majority		951	19.4	
Turnout		4,926	48.8	+2.6
Registered electors		10,097		
Liberal Democrats hold		Swing		

=== Offerton ===
Offerton
Party	Candidate	Votes	%	±%
Liberal Democrats	Jamie Hirst	1,736	35.7	−3.8
Reform	Stuart Kirby	1,481	30.5	N/A
Labour	Helen Hibbert	908	18.7	−20.2
Green	Suzi Mäkinen	500	10.3	+5.0
Conservative	Andrew Lord	234	4.8	−2.7
Majority		255	5.2	
Turnout		4,873	43.1	+8.7
Registered electors		11,304		
Liberal Democrats hold		Swing		

=== Reddish North ===
Reddish North
Party	Candidate	Votes	%	±%
Green	David White	1,588	36.4	+22.6
Reform	Dan Cole	1,446	33.2	N/A
Labour	Dan Farley	959	22.0	−45.2
Conservative	Karl Seppman	185	4.2	−5.8
Liberal Democrats	Heather Smith	179	4.1	−1.7
Majority		142	3.2	
Turnout		4,375	37.9	+11.2
Registered electors		11,547		
Green gain from Independent		Swing		

=== Reddish South ===
Reddish South
Party	Candidate	Votes	%	±%
Green	Laura Smith	2,515	54.2	−1.3
Reform	John Jones	1,226	26.4	N/A
Labour	Papa Andoh-Kweku	540	11.6	−25.1
Conservative	Hassan Sajjad	192	4.1	−1.8
Liberal Democrats	Eileen Campbell	164	3.5	+1.6
Majority		1,289	27.8	
Turnout		4,656	40.9	+5.7
Registered electors		11,384		
Green hold		Swing		
