= 2021 Stockport Metropolitan Borough Council election =

English local election

2021 Stockport Metropolitan Borough Council Council election
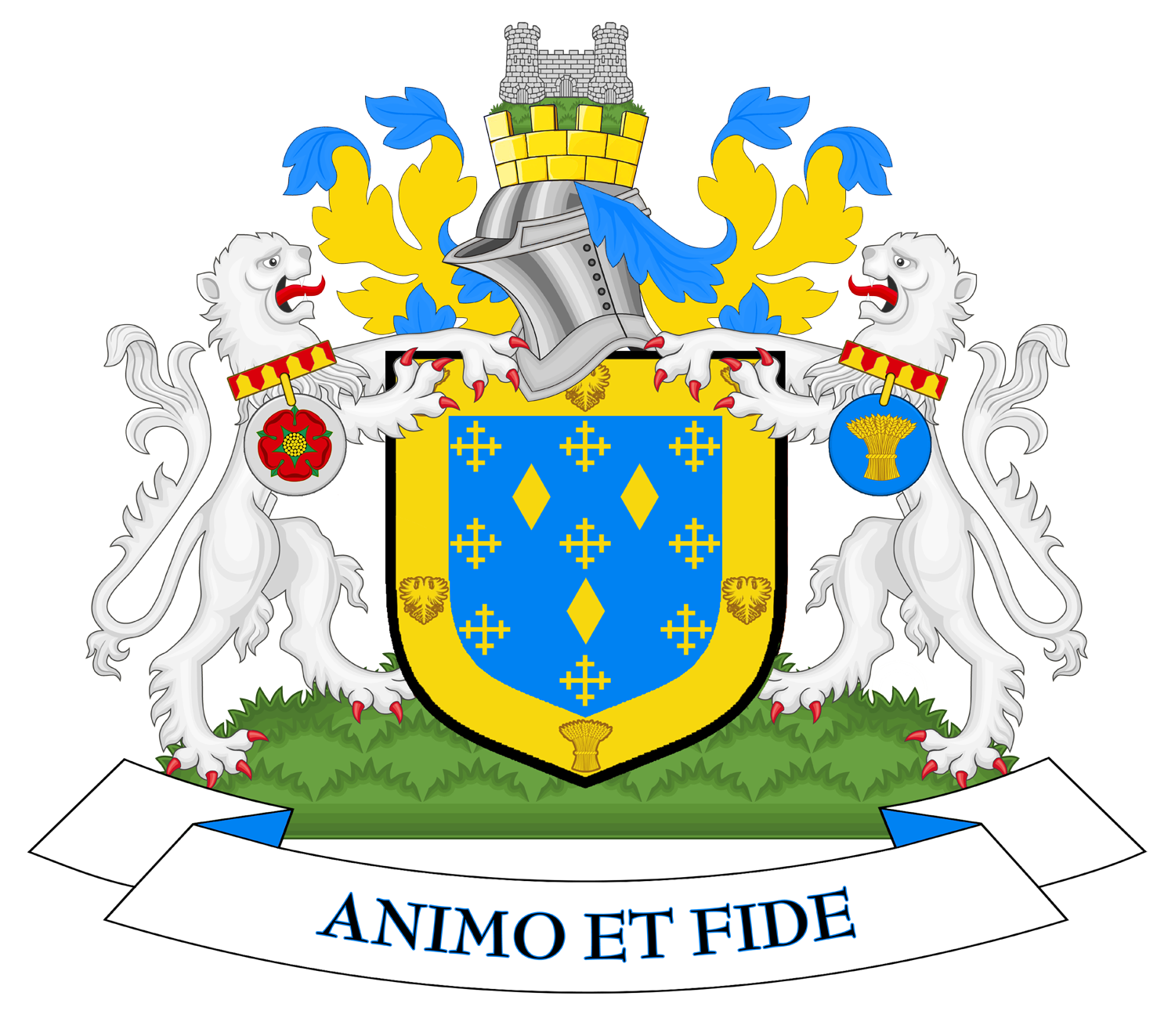
← 2019	6 May 2021	2022 →

21 of 63 seats (one third) to Stockport Metropolitan Borough Council 32 seats needed for a majority
	First party	Second party
Leader	Mark Hunter	Elise Wilson
Party	Liberal Democrats	Labour
Leader's seat	Cheadle Hulme South	Davenport and Cale Green
Seats before	26	26
Seats won	26	25
Seat change	Steady	▼1
Popular vote	27,300	28,525
Percentage	30.6%	31.9%
Swing	▼4.0%	▲4.1%
	Third party	Fourth party
		HG
Leader	Mike Hurleston	Adrian Nottingham
Party	Conservative	Heald Green Ratepayers
Leader's seat	Bramhall South and Woodford	Heald Green
Seats before	8	3
Seats won	8	3
Seat change	Steady	Steady
Popular vote	22,996	1,976
Percentage	25.7%	2.2%
Swing	▲5.3%	▼1.0%
- Map showing the results the 2021 Stockport Metropolitan Borough Council elections by ward. Red shows Labour seats, blue shows the Conservatives, yellow shows the Liberal Democrats, light green the Heald Green Ratepayers and green the Green Party.
Leader of the Council before election
Elise Wilson
Labour
Leader of the Council
Elise Wilson
Labour

The 2021 Stockport Metropolitan Borough Council election was held on 6 May 2021, to elect members of Stockport Metropolitan Borough Council in England. This was on the same day as other local elections.

Stockport Council is elected in thirds, which means that in each three member local ward, one councillor is elected every year, except every four years which is classed as a fallow year. These elections were originally scheduled for 2020 but were suspended for a year due to the COVID-19 pandemic. Due to the delayed election those councillors elected in 2021 will serve a three-year term, expiring in 2024.

== Results summary ==
Changes in seat numbers are compared with the composition of the council immediately prior to the election. Changes in vote share are compared with the previous election in 2019.

Stockport Metropolitan Borough Council
Party	This election			Full council			This election		
Party	Seats	Net	Seats %	Other	Total	Total %	Votes	Votes %	+/−
Liberal Democrats	8	Steady	38.1	18	26	41.3	27,300	30.59	▼3.96
Labour	8	▼1	38.1	17	25	39.7	28,525	31.96	▲4.17
Conservative	3	Steady	14.3	5	8	12.7	22,996	25.76	▲5.35
Green	1	▲1	4.8	0	1	1.6	7,274	8.15	▼1.11
Heald Green Ratepayers	1	Steady	4.8	2	3	4.8	1,976	2.21	▼1.02
Independent	0	Steady	0.0	0	0	0.0	704	0.79	▼0.60
Reform UK	0	Steady	0.0	0	0	0.0	282	0.32	N/A
Women's Equality	0	Steady	0.0	0	0	0.0	103	0.12	▼0.13
TUSC	0	Steady	0.0	0	0	0.0	98	0.11	N/A

== Aftermath ==
Since 2011, no single political party has held a majority on the council, with it being run as a minority administration by the largest party - from 2011 to 2016 by the Liberal Democrats, and since 2016 by Labour. In this election, the Liberal Democrats overtook Labour to once again become the largest party on the council. In the subsequent council vote however, the eight-strong Conservative group decided to support the continuation of the minority Labour administration, voting against a bid to remove the Labour leader of the council.

== Ward results ==
Asterisk indicates incumbent in the Ward, and Bold names highlight winning candidate.

All % changes are since 2016, when these seats were last up for election.

=== Bramhall North ===
Bramhall North
Party	Candidate	Votes	%	±%
Conservative	Linda Holt *	2,512	52	+5
Liberal Democrats	Mark Jones	1,529	32	−5
Labour	Abd-Assamad Mahmud	452	9	+1
Green	Deborah Hind	314	7	−
Majority		983		
Turnout		4838	47	
Registered electors		10,374		
Conservative hold		Swing		

=== Bramhall South and Woodford ===
Bramhall South and Woodford
Party	Candidate	Votes	%	±%
Conservative	Brian Bagnall *	2,535	48	+3
Liberal Democrats	Ian Powney	2,136	40	−1
Labour	Sue Glithero	355	7	+1
Green	Andrew Dearden	255	5	−3
Majority		399		
Turnout		5,320	52	
Registered electors		10,191		
Conservative hold		Swing		

=== Bredbury and Woodley ===
Bredbury and Woodley
Party	Candidate	Votes	%	±%
Liberal Democrats	Sue Thorpe	1,749	49	−4
Conservative	Timothy Morley	921	26	+13
Labour	Louise Heywood	718	20	+5
Green	Stephanie Wyatt	183	5	−1
Majority		828		
Turnout		3,592	34	
Registered electors		10,670		
Liberal Democrats hold		Swing		

=== Bredbury Green and Romiley ===
Bredbury Green and Romiley
Party	Candidate	Votes	%	±%
Liberal Democrats	Lisa Smart *	2,366	57	−3
Conservative	Richard Ellis	1,144	27	+7
Labour	Rachel Wise	490	12	−1
Green	Alex Crompton	182	4	−3
Majority		1,222		
Turnout		4,206	38	
Registered electors		11,060		
Liberal Democrats hold		Swing		

=== Brinnington and Central ===
Brinnington and Central
Party	Candidate	Votes	%	±%
Labour	Andy Sorton *	1,584	62	+2
Conservative	Natalie Fenton	473	19	+8
Green	Karl Wardlaw	225	9	−4
Liberal Democrats	David Brewin	164	6	−3
TUSC	John Pearson	98	4	New
Majority		1,111		
Turnout		2,568	23	
Registered electors		11,229		
Labour hold		Swing		

=== Cheadle and Gatley ===
Cheadle and Gatley
Party	Candidate	Votes	%	±%
Liberal Democrats	Keith Holloway *	2,283	46	−3
Conservative	Adrian Walmsley	1,411	28	+4
Labour	Colin Owen	923	19	−
Green	Alexander Drury	357	7	−
Majority		872		
Turnout		5,007	41	
Registered electors		12,184		
Liberal Democrats hold		Swing		

=== Cheadle Hulme North ===
Cheadle Hulme North
Party	Candidate	Votes	%	±%
Liberal Democrats	Jilly Julian	1,943	45	−6
Labour Co-op	Claire Vibert	1,618	37	+6
Conservative	Sue Carroll	639	15	+7
Green	Michael Padfield	157	4	−
Majority		325		
Turnout		4,375	44	
Registered electors		10,043		
Liberal Democrats hold		Swing		

=== Cheadle Hulme South ===
Cheadle Hulme South
Party	Candidate	Votes	%	±%
Liberal Democrats	Mark Hunter *	2,888	61	+8
Conservative	Brian Dougal	1,135	24	+2
Labour	James Mason	428	9	−
Green	Chitra Ramachandran	191	4	−4
Reform UK	Taff Davies	76	2	New
Independent	Paul Davies	32	1	New
Majority		1,753		
Turnout		4,768	44	
Registered electors		10,887		
Liberal Democrats hold		Swing		

=== Davenport and Cale Green ===
Davenport and Cale Green
Party	Candidate	Votes	%	±%
Labour	Wendy Wild *	2,344	64	+7
Conservative	Michael Lyons	631	17	+4
Liberal Democrats	Gemma-Jane Bowker	338	9	−7
Green	Paolo Granelli	279	8	−7
Reform UK	Stephen Speakman	96	3	New
Majority		1,713		
Turnout		3,711	33	
Registered electors		11,140		
Labour hold		Swing		

=== Edgeley & Cheadle Heath ===
Edgeley & Cheadle Heath
Party	Candidate	Votes	%	±%
Labour	Sheila Bailey *	2,561	72	+9
Conservative	Richard Walsh	460	13	+4
Green	Shaughan Rick	302	9	−1
Liberal Democrats	Tracey Whitmore	210	6	−1
Majority		2,101		
Turnout		3,560	34	
Registered electors		10,560		
Labour hold		Swing		

=== Hazel Grove ===
Hazel Grove
Party	Candidate	Votes	%	±%
Conservative	Oliver Johnstone	2,212	45	+16
Liberal Democrats	Charles Gibson *	1,848	37	−11
Labour Co-op	Christine Carrigan	725	15	+4
Green	Catherine De Cadorette	169	3	−1
Majority		364		
Turnout		4,990	45	
Registered electors		10,987		
Conservative gain from Liberal Democrats		Swing		

=== Heald Green ===
Heald Green
Party	Candidate	Votes	%	±%
Heald Green Ratepayers	Anna Charles-Jones *	1,976	54	−15
Labour	Holly McCormack	592	16	+3
Conservative	Yvonne Salmons	469	13	+6
Liberal Democrats	Ian Hunter	380	10	+4
Green	Ian Brown	224	6	+1
Majority		1,447		
Turnout		3,665	37	
Registered electors		10,000		
Heald Green Ratepayers hold		Swing		

=== Heatons North ===
Heatons North
Party	Candidate	Votes	%	±%
Labour Co-op	David Sedgwick *	3,358	66	+16
Conservative	Hassan Sajjad	928	18	−1
Green	Samuel Dugdale	416	8	−8
Liberal Democrats	Jenny Humphreys	280	6	−5
Women's Equality	Paula King	103	2	−3
Majority		2430		
Turnout		5,123	46	
Registered electors		11,037		
Labour Co-op hold		Swing		

=== Heatons South ===
Heatons South
Party	Candidate	Votes	%	±%
Labour	Colin Foster *	3,271	67	+8
Conservative	Jason Davis-D'Cruz	884	18	+2
Green	Sophie Tyrrell	519	11	−5
Liberal Democrats	Jeffrey Scroggie	195	4	−5
Majority		2,387		
Turnout		4,911	45	
Registered electors		10,861		
Labour hold		Swing		

=== Manor ===
Manor
Party	Candidate	Votes	%	±%
Labour Co-op	Charlie Stewart*	1,674	47	+2
Liberal Democrats	Mike Nash	1,216	34	+7
Conservative	Karl Seppman	463	13	+2
Green	Anthony Rablen	217	6	−4
Majority		458		
Turnout		3,598	34	
Registered electors		10,536		
Labour Co-op hold		Swing		

=== Marple North ===
Marple North
Party	Candidate	Votes	%	±%
Liberal Democrats	Malcolm Allan *	2,707	54	+3
Conservative	Annette Finnie	1,402	28	+7
Labour	Peter Towey	560	11	−7
Green	Carolyn Leather	366	7	−2
Majority		1,305		
Turnout		5,060	52	
Registered electors		9,766		
Liberal Democrats hold		Swing		

=== Marple South and High Lane ===
Marple South and High Lane
Party	Candidate	Votes	%	±%
Liberal Democrats	Shan Alexander	2,299	50	+4
Conservative	Darran Palmer	1,409	31	+16
Labour	Paul Wright	613	13	+2
Green	Andrew Threlfall	290	6	+1
Majority		890		
Turnout		4,639	46	
Registered electors		9,978		
Liberal Democrats gain from Conservative		Swing		

=== Offerton ===
Offerton
Party	Candidate	Votes	%	±%
Liberal Democrats	Oliver Harrison	1,280	36	−21
Labour	Joe Barratt	1,138	32	+15
Conservative	Tony Moore	886	25	+8
Green	Simon Edge	141	4	−6
Reform UK	John Kelly	110	3	New
Majority		142		
Turnout		3,572	35	
Registered electors		10,305		
Liberal Democrats hold		Swing		

=== Reddish North ===
Reddish North
Party	Candidate	Votes	%	±%
Labour	Kate Butler *	2,029	61	+3
Conservative	Jacob Chacko	500	15	+1
Independent	Carl Evans	462	14	New
Green	Helena Mellish	252	8	−12
Liberal Democrats	Susan Ingham	92	3	−5
Majority		1,529		
Turnout		3,348	31	
Registered electors		10,844		
Labour hold		Swing		

=== Reddish South ===
Reddish South
Party	Candidate	Votes	%	±%
Green	Gary Lawson	2,010	47.85	+29
Labour	Yvonne Guariento *	1,453	34.59	−12
Conservative	Rita Jones	450	10.71	−1
Independent	Daniel Zieba	210	5.00	N/A
Liberal Democrats	Alex Orndal	60	1.43	−8
Majority		557	13.26	
Turnout		4,201	40	
Registered electors		10,405		
Green gain from Labour		Swing		

=== Stepping Hill ===
Stepping Hill
Party	Candidate	Votes	%	±%
Labour	Rory Leonard	1,639	34.45	+9
Conservative	Paul Hadfield	1,532	32.21	+2
Liberal Democrats	Mark Weldon *	1,337	28.11	−9
Green	Stephen Torley	225	4.73	−2
Majority		107	2.25	
Turnout		4,757	46	
Registered electors		10,330		
Labour gain from Liberal Democrats		Swing		
