= 2022 Stockport Metropolitan Borough Council election =

2022 local election in England

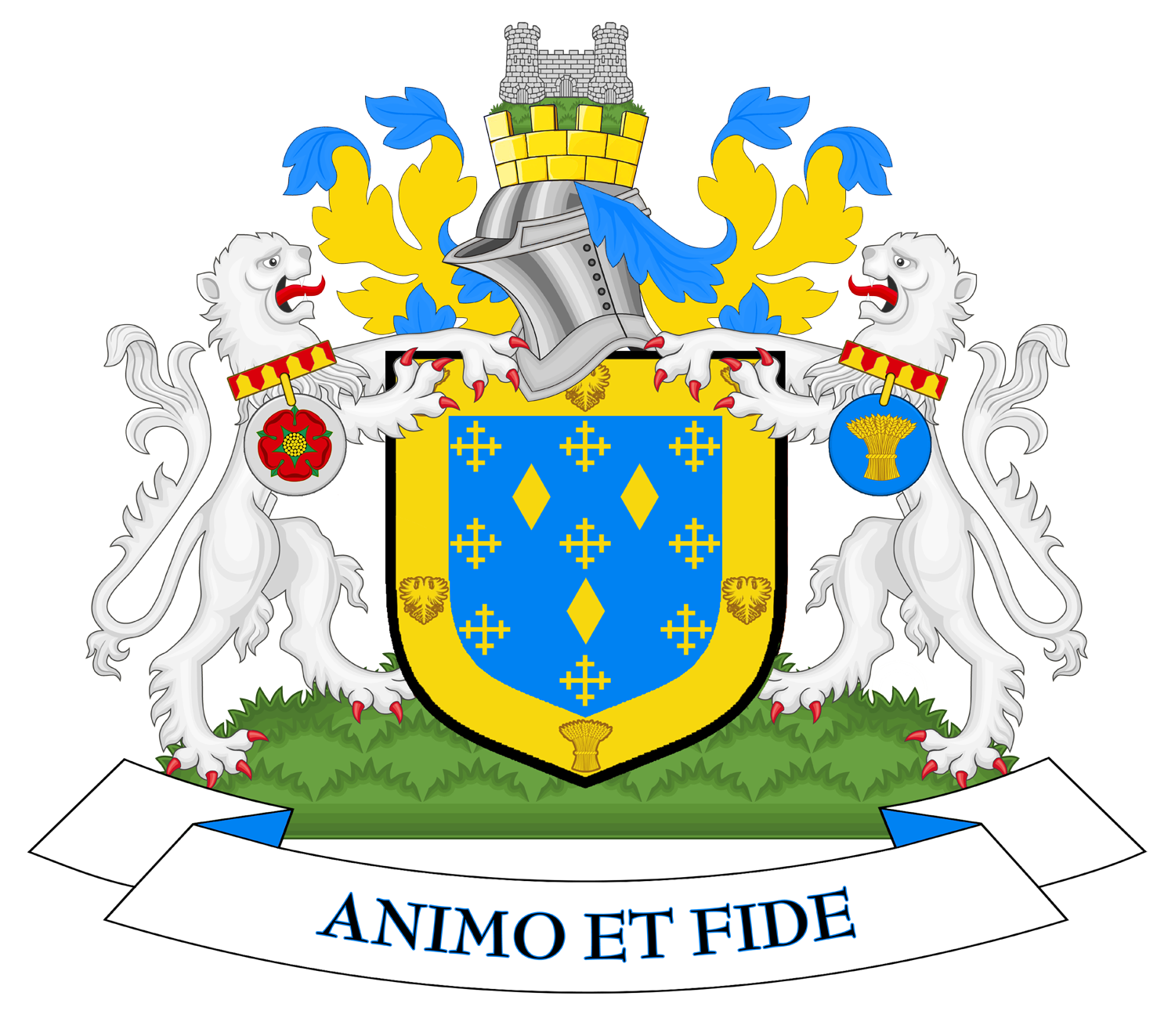
| ← 2021 | 5 May 2022 | 2023 → |

21 out of 63 seats to Stockport Metropolitan Borough Council 32 seats needed for a majority
- Turnout: 35.7%

| | First party | Second party | Third party |
|---|---|---|---|
| Leader | Mark Hunter | Elise Wilson | Mike Hurleston |
| Party | Liberal Democrats | Labour | Conservative |
| Leader's seat | Cheadle Hulme South | Davenport and Cale Green | Bramhall South and Woodford |
| Seats before | 26 | 25 | 8 |
| Seats won | 10 | 9 | 0 |
| Seats after | 28 | 25 | 5 |
| Seat change | ▲2 | Steady | ▼3 |
| Popular vote | 27,452 | 25,986 | 17,241 |
| Percentage | 34.5% | 32.7% | 21.7% |
| Swing | ▲3.9% | ▲0.7% | ▼4.1% |
| | Fourth party | Fifth party |
| Leader | Anna Charles-Jones | N/A |
| Party | Heald Green Ratepayers | Green |
| Leader's seat | Heald Green | N/A |
| Seats before | 3 | 1 |
| Seats won | 1 | 1 |
| Seats after | 3 | 2 |
| Seat change | Steady | ▲1 |
| Popular vote | 1,552 | 6,351 |
| Percentage | 2.0% | 8.0% |
| Swing | ▼0.3% | ▼0.2% |
- Winner of each seat at the 2022 Stockport Metropolitan Borough Council election
Leader of the Council before election
Elise Wilson
Labour
Leader of the Council
Mark Hunter
Liberal Democrats

The 2022 Stockport Metropolitan Borough Council election took place 5 May 2022 to elect members of Stockport Metropolitan Borough Council. This was on the same day as other local elections. 21 of the 63 seats were up for election.

== Background ==
Stockport began as a Conservative council, with Conservative majorities from 1975 to 1982. The Liberal Democrats (Liberal Party from 1973 to 1988) overtook the Conservatives in 1992, and formed their first administration in 1999, before another period of no overall control from 2000 to 2002 with the second Liberal Democrat majority lasting until 2011. A Labour minority administration replaced the Liberal Democrats in 2016, and has survived despite the Liberal Democrats becoming the largest party in 2021. In the 2021 election, the Liberal Democrats made no gains or losses with 30.59% of the vote, Labour lost 1 seat with 31.96%, the Conservatives made no gains or losses with 25.76%, the Green Party won their first seat on the council with 8.15%, and Heald Green Ratepayers kept their seat up for election with 2.21%.

The seats up for election in 2022 were last elected in 2018. In that election, Labour gained 2 seats with 33.4%, the Liberal Democrats lost 1 seat with 31.6%, Conservatives lost 1 seat with 27.1%, and independents made no gains or losses with 2.9%.

== Previous council composition ==
| After 2021 election | | Before 2022 election | |
| Party | Seats | Party | Seats |
|---|---|---|---|
| Liberal Democrats | 26 | Liberal Democrats | 26 |
| Labour | 25 | Labour | 25 |
| Conservative | 8 | Conservative | 8 |
| Heald Green Ratepayers | 3 | Heald Green Ratepayers | 3 |
| Green | 1 | Green | 1 |

== Results ==
Changes are compared with the 2021 election.

2022 Stockport Metropolitan Borough Council election
| Party | This election | | | Full council | | | This election | | |
| Party | Seats | Net | Seats % | Other | Total | Total % | Votes | Votes % | +/− |
|---|---|---|---|---|---|---|---|---|---|
| Liberal Democrats | 10 | ▲2 | 47.6 | 18 | 28 | 44.4 | 27,452 | 34.5 | +3.9 |
| Labour | 9 | Steady | 42.9 | 16 | 25 | 39.7 | 25,986 | 32.7 | +0.7 |
| Conservative | 0 | ▼3 | 0 | 5 | 5 | 7.9 | 17,241 | 21.7 | –4.1 |
| Heald Green Ratepayers | 1 | Steady | 4.8 | 2 | 3 | 4.8 | 1,552 | 2.0 | –0.3 |
| Green | 1 | ▲1 | 4.8 | 1 | 2 | 3.2 | 6,351 | 8.0 | –0.2 |
| Reform UK | 0 | Steady | 0 | 0 | 0 | 0 | 369 | 0.5 | +0.2 |
| Women's Equality | 0 | Steady | 0 | 0 | 0 | 0 | 209 | 0.3 | +0.1 |
| Independent | 0 | Steady | 0 | 0 | 0 | 0 | 42 | 0.1 | N/A |

== Results by ward ==
An asterisk indicates an incumbent councillor. Councillors were last elected in 2018 and changes are compared to those results.

=== Bramhall North ===
Bramhall North
| Party | Candidate | Votes | % | ±% |
|---|---|---|---|---|
| Liberal Democrats | Frankie Singleton | 1,774 | 42.1 | +10 |
| Conservative | Lisa Walker* | 1,734 | 41.1 | −11 |
| Labour | Terry Tallis | 417 | 9.9 | +1 |
| Green | Deborah Hind | 276 | 6.5 | ±0 |
| Majority | | 40 | 1.0 | |
| Rejected ballots | | 17 | 0.4 | |
| Turnout | | 4,218 | 41.1 | −6 |
| Registered electors | | 10,253 | | |
| Liberal Democrats gain from Conservative | | Swing | | |

=== Bramhall South and Woodford ===
Bramhall South and Woodford
| Party | Candidate | Votes | % | ±% |
|---|---|---|---|---|
| Liberal Democrats | Ian Powney | 2,361 | 48.4 | +8 |
| Conservative | John McGahan* | 2,038 | 41.8 | −6 |
| Labour | Yvonne Guariento | 288 | 5.9 | −1 |
| Green | Andrew Dearden | 177 | 3.6 | −1 |
| Majority | | 323 | 6.6 | |
| Rejected ballots | | 17 | 0.3 | |
| Turnout | | 4,881 | 47.8 | −4 |
| Registered electors | | 10,203 | | |
| Liberal Democrats gain from Conservative | | Swing | | |

=== Bredbury and Woodley ===
Bredbury and Woodley
| Party | Candidate | Votes | % | ±% |
|---|---|---|---|---|
| Liberal Democrats | Vince Shaw | 1,532 | 41.1 | −8 |
| Labour | Joe Barratt | 1,296 | 34.8 | +15 |
| Conservative | Tim Morley | 735 | 19.7 | −6 |
| Green | Stephanie Wyatt | 147 | 3.9 | −1 |
| Majority | | 236 | 6.3 | |
| Rejected ballots | | 17 | 0.5 | |
| Turnout | | 3,727 | 35.1 | +1 |
| Registered electors | | 10,616 | | |
| Liberal Democrats hold | | Swing | | |

=== Bredbury Green and Romiley ===
Bredbury Green and Romiley
| Party | Candidate | Votes | % | ±% |
|---|---|---|---|---|
| Liberal Democrats | Angie Clark* | 2,299 | 59.1 | +2 |
| Conservative | Sally Bennett | 943 | 24.3 | −3 |
| Labour | Rachel Wise | 472 | 12.1 | ±0 |
| Green | Lucy Priest | 156 | 4.0 | ±0 |
| Majority | | 1,356 | 34.8 | |
| Rejected ballots | | 17 | 0.4 | |
| Turnout | | 3,887 | 35.2 | −3 |
| Registered electors | | 11,031 | | |
| Liberal Democrats hold | | Swing | | |

=== Brinnington and Central ===
Brinnington and Central
| Party | Candidate | Votes | % | ±% |
|---|---|---|---|---|
| Labour Co-op | Amanda Peers | 1,391 | 64.1 | +2 |
| Conservative | Rosalind Lloyd | 347 | 16.0 | −3 |
| Green | Carolyn Leather | 232 | 10.7 | +2 |
| Liberal Democrats | Susan Ingham | 185 | 8.5 | +3 |
| Majority | | 1,044 | 48.1 | |
| Rejected ballots | | 16 | 0.7 | |
| Turnout | | 2,171 | 18.9 | −4 |
| Registered electors | | 11,510 | | |
| Labour Co-op hold | | Swing | | |

=== Cheadle and Gatley ===
Cheadle and Gatley
| Party | Candidate | Votes | % | ±% |
|---|---|---|---|---|
| Liberal Democrats | Ian Hunter | 2,385 | 54.4 | +8 |
| Conservative | Adrian Walmsley | 1,046 | 23.8 | −4 |
| Labour | Colin Owen | 677 | 15.4 | −4 |
| Green | Alexander Drury | 265 | 6.0 | −1 |
| Majority | | 1,339 | 30.6 | |
| Rejected ballots | | 14 | 0.3 | |
| Turnout | | 4,387 | 36.1 | −5 |
| Registered electors | | 12,146 | | |
| Liberal Democrats hold | | Swing | | |

=== Cheadle Hulme North ===
Cheadle Hulme North
| Party | Candidate | Votes | % | ±% |
|---|---|---|---|---|
| Labour Co-op | David Meller* | 1,814 | 45.6 | +9 |
| Liberal Democrats | Michael Hannon | 1,578 | 39.6 | −5 |
| Conservative | Brian Dougal | 443 | 11.1 | −4 |
| Green | Michael Padfield | 136 | 3.4 | −1 |
| Majority | | 236 | 6.0 | |
| Rejected ballots | | 9 | 0.2 | |
| Turnout | | 3,980 | 39.9 | −4 |
| Registered electors | | 9,987 | | |
| Labour Co-op hold | | Swing | | |

=== Cheadle Hulme South ===
Cheadle Hulme South
| Party | Candidate | Votes | % | ±% |
|---|---|---|---|---|
| Liberal Democrats | Helen Foster-Grime* | 2,487 | 57.8 | −3 |
| Conservative | Peter Crossen | 1,160 | 27.0 | +3 |
| Labour | Barry Hawkins | 399 | 9.3 | ±0 |
| Green | Andrew O'Shea | 176 | 4.1 | ±0 |
| Reform UK | Taff Davies | 64 | 1.5 | ±0 |
| Majority | | 1,327 | 30.8 | |
| Rejected ballots | | 15 | 0.3 | |
| Turnout | | 4,301 | 39.8 | −4 |
| Registered electors | | 10,815 | | |
| Liberal Democrats hold | | Swing | | |

=== Davenport and Cale Green ===
Davenport and Cale Green
| Party | Candidate | Votes | % | ±% |
|---|---|---|---|---|
| Labour | Elise Wilson* | 2,085 | 64.8 | +1 |
| Conservative | Michael Lyons | 440 | 13.7 | −3 |
| Liberal Democrats | Charles Gibson | 311 | 9.7 | +1 |
| Green | William Hanson | 225 | 7.0 | −1 |
| Reform UK | Dottie Hopkins | 108 | 3.4 | ±0 |
| Stockport Fights Austerity No to Cuts | John Pearson | 42 | 1.3 | N/A |
| Majority | | 1,645 | 51.1 | |
| Rejected ballots | | 6 | 0.2 | |
| Turnout | | 3,217 | 28.8 | −4 |
| Registered electors | | 11,177 | | |
| Labour hold | | Swing | | |

=== Edgeley and Cheadle Heath ===
Edgeley and Cheadle Heath
| Party | Candidate | Votes | % | ±% |
|---|---|---|---|---|
| Labour | Louise Heywood | 2,172 | 71.6 | ±0 |
| Conservative | Karl Seppman | 309 | 10.2 | −3 |
| Liberal Democrats | Tracey Whitmore | 250 | 8.2 | +2 |
| Green | Shaughan Rick | 234 | 7.7 | −1 |
| Reform UK | Lynn Schofield | 60 | 2.0 | N/A |
| Majority | | 1,863 | 61.4 | |
| Rejected ballots | | 7 | 0.2 | |
| Turnout | | 3,032 | 28.8 | −5 |
| Registered electors | | 10,543 | | |
| Labour hold | | Swing | | |

=== Hazel Grove ===
Hazel Grove
| Party | Candidate | Votes | % | ±% |
|---|---|---|---|---|
| Liberal Democrats | Paul Ankers* | 2,107 | 48.1 | +11 |
| Conservative | Tony Moore | 1,543 | 35.2 | −10 |
| Labour | Georgia Lynott | 534 | 12.2 | −3 |
| Green | Catherine de Cadorette | 183 | 4.2 | +1 |
| Majority | | 564 | 12.9 | |
| Rejected ballots | | 15 | 0.3 | |
| Turnout | | 4,382 | 40.0 | −5 |
| Registered electors | | 11,493 | | |
| Liberal Democrats hold | | Swing | | |

=== Heald Green ===
Heald Green
| Party | Candidate | Votes | % | ±% |
|---|---|---|---|---|
| Heald Green Ratepayers | Catherine Stuart | 1,552 | 49.8 | −4 |
| Liberal Democrats | Gemma-Jane Bowker | 520 | 16.7 | +7 |
| Labour | Kath Priestley | 518 | 16.6 | +1 |
| Conservative | Yvonne Salmons | 376 | 12.1 | −1 |
| Green | Chitra Ramachandran | 109 | 3.5 | −2 |
| Majority | | 1,032 | 33.1 | |
| Rejected ballots | | 12 | 0.4 | |
| Turnout | | 3,117 | 31.5 | −5 |
| Registered electors | | 10,962 | | |
| Heald Green Ratepayers hold | | Swing | | |

=== Heatons North ===
Heatons North
| Party | Candidate | Votes | % | ±% |
|---|---|---|---|---|
| Labour | John Taylor* | 2,532 | 61.2 | −5 |
| Conservative | Jason Davis-D'Cruz | 763 | 18.4 | ±0 |
| Green | Sam Dugdale | 469 | 11.3 | +3 |
| Liberal Democrats | Jenny Humphreys | 250 | 6.0 | ±0 |
| Women's Equality | Dianne Coffey | 108 | 2.6 | +1 |
| Majority | | 1,769 | 42.8 | |
| Rejected ballots | | 14 | 0.3 | |
| Turnout | | 4,136 | 38.0 | −8 |
| Registered electors | | 10,898 | | |
| Labour hold | | Swing | | |

=== Heatons South ===
Heatons South
| Party | Candidate | Votes | % | ±% |
|---|---|---|---|---|
| Labour | Tom McGee* | 2,749 | 67.0 | ±0 |
| Conservative | Natalie Fenton | 663 | 16.2 | −2 |
| Green | Sophie Tyrell | 454 | 11.1 | ±0 |
| Liberal Democrats | Jeffrey Scroggie | 226 | 5.5 | +2 |
| Majority | | 2,086 | 50.8 | |
| Rejected ballots | | 8 | 0.2 | |
| Turnout | | 4,100 | 38.1 | −7 |
| Registered electors | | 10,773 | | |
| Labour hold | | Swing | | |

=== Manor ===
Manor
| Party | Candidate | Votes | % | ±% |
|---|---|---|---|---|
| Labour | Sue Glithero | 1,579 | 50.2 | +3 |
| Liberal Democrats | Mike Nash | 1,011 | 32.1 | −2 |
| Conservative | Janice McGahan | 366 | 11.6 | −1 |
| Green | Tony Rablen | 169 | 5.4 | −1 |
| Majority | | 568 | 18.1 | |
| Rejected ballots | | 21 | 0.7 | |
| Turnout | | 3,146 | 29.9 | −4 |
| Registered electors | | 10,539 | | |
| Labour hold | | Swing | | |

=== Marple North ===
Marple North
| Party | Candidate | Votes | % | ±% |
|---|---|---|---|---|
| Liberal Democrats | Stephen Gribbon* | 2,624 | 56.4 | +2 |
| Conservative | Annette Finnie | 1,023 | 22.0 | −6 |
| Labour | Claire Vibert | 729 | 15.7 | +5 |
| Green | John Bright | 267 | 5.7 | −1 |
| Majority | | 1,601 | 34.4 | |
| Rejected ballots | | 10 | 0.2 | |
| Turnout | | 4,653 | 48.0 | −4 |
| Registered electors | | 9,688 | | |
| Liberal Democrats hold | | Swing | | |

=== Marple South and High Lane ===
Marple South and High Lane
| Party | Candidate | Votes | % | ±% |
|---|---|---|---|---|
| Liberal Democrats | Colin MacAlister* | 2,334 | 58.0 | +8 |
| Conservative | Andrew Lord | 1,025 | 25.5 | −5 |
| Labour | Paul Wright | 424 | 10.5 | −2 |
| Green | Andrew Threlfall | 224 | 5.6 | ±0 |
| Majority | | 1,309 | 32.5 | |
| Rejected ballots | | 16 | 0.4 | |
| Turnout | | 4,023 | 40.3 | −6 |
| Registered electors | | 9,977 | | |
| Liberal Democrats hold | | Swing | | |

=== Offerton ===
Offerton
| Party | Candidate | Votes | % | ±% |
|---|---|---|---|---|
| Liberal Democrats | Will Dawson* | 1,516 | 45.5 | +10 |
| Labour | Will Sharp | 950 | 28.5 | −3 |
| Conservative | Andrew Baker | 672 | 20.2 | −5 |
| Green | Simon Edge | 91 | 2.7 | −1 |
| Reform UK | John Kelly | 91 | 2.7 | ±0 |
| Majority | | 566 | 17.0 | |
| Rejected ballots | | 10 | 0.3 | |
| Turnout | | 3,330 | 32.5 | −2 |
| Registered electors | | 10,251 | | |
| Liberal Democrats hold | | Swing | | |

=== Reddish North ===
Reddish North
| Party | Candidate | Votes | % | ±% |
|---|---|---|---|---|
| Labour | David Wilson* | 1,881 | 68.7 | +8 |
| Conservative | Hamida Jaweed | 362 | 13.2 | −2 |
| Green | Helena Mellish | 246 | 9.0 | +1 |
| Liberal Democrats | Geoffrey Abell | 128 | 4.7 | +2 |
| Women's Equality | Paula King | 101 | 3.7 | N/A |
| Majority | | 1,519 | 55.5 | |
| Rejected ballots | | 20 | 0.7 | |
| Turnout | | 2,738 | 25.5 | −5 |
| Registered electors | | 10,748 | | |
| Labour hold | | Swing | | |

=== Reddish South ===
Reddish South
| Party | Candidate | Votes | % | ±% |
|---|---|---|---|---|
| Green | Liz Crix | 1,916 | 50.2 | +2.3 |
| Labour | Holly McCormack | 1,538 | 40.3 | +5.7 |
| Conservative | Hassan Sajjad | 287 | 7.5 | −3.2 |
| Liberal Democrats | Mark Jones | 60 | 1.6 | +0.2 |
| Majority | | 378 | 9.9 | |
| Rejected ballots | | 17 | 0.4 | |
| Turnout | | 3,818 | 36.8 | −3 |
| Registered electors | | 10,385 | | |
| Green gain from Labour | | Swing | | |

=== Stepping Hill ===
Stepping Hill
| Party | Candidate | Votes | % | ±% |
|---|---|---|---|---|
| Labour Co-op | Christine Carrigan | 1,541 | 36.0 | +1.5 |
| Liberal Democrats | Pete West | 1,514 | 35.4 | +6.3 |
| Conservative | John Wright* | 966 | 22.6 | −9.6 |
| Green | Steve Torley | 199 | 4.7 | ±0.0 |
| Reform UK | Stephen Speakman | 46 | 1.1 | N/A |
| Majority | | 27 | 0.6 | |
| Rejected ballots | | 9 | 0.2 | |
| Turnout | | 4,275 | 41.3 | −5 |
| Registered electors | | 10,360 | | |
| Labour Co-op gain from Conservative | | Swing | | |

== Aftermath ==
In the previous council elections in 2021, the Conservative group had voted with Labour to continue the Labour administration.

After these elections the Labour and Conservative councillors combined no longer held a majority, meaning a Liberal Democrat minority administration was able to be formed.

== Changes since this election ==
=== Edgeley and Cheadle Heath by-election ===
A by-election was held on 13 October 2022 in the Edgeley and Cheadle Heath ward due to the death of councillor Sheila Bailey on 3 August 2022. Changes are relative to the 2021 election.

Edgeley and Cheadle Heath by-election
| Party | Candidate | Votes | % | ±% |
|---|---|---|---|---|
| Labour | Georgia Lynott | 1,172 | 53.0 | −19 |
| Liberal Democrats | Robbie Cowbury | 840 | 38.0 | +32 |
| Green | Philip Handscomb | 200 | 9.0 | ±0 |
| Majority | | 332 | 15.0 | −44 |
| Total valid votes | | 2,212 | 20.8 | |
| Rejected ballots | | 26 | 1.2 | |
| Turnout | | 2,238 | 21.1 | −12.9 |
| Registered electors | | 10,626 | | |
| Labour hold | | Swing | -25.5 | |
