= 2023 Stockport Metropolitan Borough Council election =

2023 local government election in Stockport

- 4 May 2023

All 63 seats to Stockport Metropolitan Borough Council 32 seats needed for a majority

| | First party | Second party | Third party |
|---|---|---|---|
| Leader | Mark Hunter | Elise Wilson | Gary Lawson |
| Party | Liberal Democrats | Labour | Green |
| Last election | 28 seats, 34.5% | 25 seats, 32.7% | 2 seats, 8.0% |
| Seats won | 30 | 24 | 3 |
| Seat change | ▲2 | ▼1 | ▲1 |
| Popular vote | 82,930 | 70,045 | 15,578 |
| Percentage | 38.5% | 32.5% | 7.2% |
| Swing | ▲4.0% | ▼0.2% | ▼0.8% |
| | Fourth party | Fifth party | Sixth party |
| Leader | Anna Charles-Jones | Matt Wynne | Mike Hurleston |
| Party | Heald Green Ratepayers | Community Association | Conservative |
| Last election | 3 seats, 2.0% | N/A | 5 seats, 21.7% |
| Seats won | 3 | 3 | 0 |
| Seat change | Steady | ▲3 | ▼5 |
| Popular vote | 4,804 | 4,662 | 35,267 |
| Percentage | 2.2% | 2.2% | 16.4% |
| Swing | ▲0.2% | N/A | ▼5.3% |
- Winner of each seat at the 2023 Stockport Metropolitan Borough Council election
Leader before election
Mark Hunter
Liberal Democrat
No overall control
Leader of the Council
Mark Hunter
Liberal Democrat
No overall control

The 2023 Stockport Metropolitan Borough Council elections took place on 4 May 2023 alongside other local elections in the United Kingdom. Due to boundary changes, all 63 seats on Stockport Metropolitan Borough Council were contested.

The council was under no overall control prior to the election, being led by a Liberal Democrat minority administration. The council remained under no overall control after the election, but the Liberal Democrats increased their share of the seats.

== Background ==
Stockport began as a Conservative council, with Conservative majorities from 1975 to 1982. The Liberal Democrats (Liberal Party from 1973 to 1988) overtook the Conservatives in 1992, and formed their first administration in 1999, before another period of no overall control from 2000 to 2002 with the second Liberal Democrat majority lasting until 2011. A Labour minority administration replaced the Liberal Democrats in 2016, and survived until 2022, when the Lib Dems increased their lead over the Labour Party and were able to take control of the authority.

In November 2022 the Local Government Boundary Commission for England made The Stockport (Electoral Changes) Order 2022, which officially abolished the 21 existing wards and replaced them with 21 new wards on different boundaries. Because of this change all 63 seats on the council, three per ward, were contested.

== Electoral process ==
The election took place using the plurality block voting system, a form of first-past-the-post voting, with each ward being represented by three councillors. The candidate with the most votes in each ward will serve a four year term ending in 2027, the second-placed candidate will serve a three year term ending in 2026 and the third-placed candidate will serve a one year term ending in 2024.

All registered electors (British, Irish, Commonwealth and European Union citizens) living in Stockport aged 18 or over were entitled to vote in the election. People who lived at two addresses in different councils, such as university students with different term-time and holiday addresses, were entitled to be registered for and vote in elections in both local authorities. Voting in-person at polling stations took place from 07:00 to 22:00 on election day, and voters were able to apply for postal votes or proxy votes in advance of the election.

== Previous council composition ==
| After 2022 election | | Before 2023 election | | After 2023 election | |
| Party | Seats | Party | Seats | Party | Seats |
|---|---|---|---|---|---|
| Liberal Democrats | 28 | Liberal Democrats | 28 | Liberal Democrats | 30 |
| Labour | 25 | Labour | 22 | Labour | 24 |
| Conservative | 5 | Conservative | 4 | Conservative | 0 |
| Heald Green Ratepayers | 3 | Heald Green Ratepayers | 3 | Heald Green Ratepayers | 3 |
| Green | 2 | Green | 2 | Green | 3 |
| | | Community Association | 1 | Community Association | 3 |
| Independent | 0 | Independent | 3 | Independent | 0 |

== Results ==
2023 Stockport Metropolitan Borough Council election
| Party | Seats | Net gain/loss | Seats % | Votes % | Votes | +/− |
|---|---|---|---|---|---|---|
| Liberal Democrats | 30 | 2 ▲ | 47.6 | 38.5 | 82,930 | |
| Labour | 24 | 1 ▼ | 38.1 | 32.5 | 70,045 | |
| Conservative | 0 | 5 ▼ | | 16.4 | 35,267 | |
| Green | 3 | 1 ▲ | 4.8 | 7.2 | 15,578 | |
| Heald Green Ratepayers | 3 | 0 | 4.8 | 2.2 | 4,804 | |
| Community Association | 3 | 3 ▲ | 4.8 | 2.2 | 4,662 | |
| Independent | 0 | 0 | | 0.5 | 1,053 | |
| Reform | 0 | 0 | | 0.3 | 606 | |
| Women's Equality | 0 | 0 | | 0.2 | 384 | |
| Stockport Fights Austerity No to Cuts | 0 | 0 | | 0.1 | 233 | |

Bold names highlight a winning candidate.

=== Bramhall North ===
Bramhall North (3)
| Party | Candidate | Votes | % |
|---|---|---|---|
| Liberal Democrats | Mark Jones | 2,210 | 51.6 |
| Liberal Democrats | Suzanne Wyatt | 2,149 | 50.2 |
| Liberal Democrats | Alex Wynne | 1,728 | 40.3 |
| Conservative | Fiona Bates | 1,634 | 38.1 |
| Conservative | Linda Holt | 1,625 | 37.9 |
| Conservative | Peter Crossen | 1,503 | 35.1 |
| Green | Deborah Hind | 468 | 10.9 |
| Labour | Jill Beswick | 420 | 9.8 |
| Labour | Mike Bennett | 311 | 7.3 |
| Labour | David Parkinson | 252 | 5.9 |
| Rejected ballots | | 13 | |
| Turnout | | 4,285 | 43.8 |
| Total votes | | 12,300 | |
| Registered electors | | 9,792 | |
| Liberal Democrats win (new seat) | | | |
| Liberal Democrats win (new seat) | | | |
| Liberal Democrats win (new seat) | | | |

=== Bramhall South & Woodford ===
Bramhall South and Woodford (3)
| Party | Candidate | Votes | % |
|---|---|---|---|
| Liberal Democrats | Ian Powney | 2,342 | 49.3 |
| Liberal Democrats | Dallas Jones | 2,228 | 46.9 |
| Liberal Democrats | Jeremy Meal | 2,188 | 46.1 |
| Conservative | Brian Bagnall | 2,025 | 42.6 |
| Conservative | Mike Hurleston | 1,828 | 38.5 |
| Conservative | John McGahan | 1,789 | 37.7 |
| Green | Andrew Dearden | 437 | 9.2 |
| Labour | Vince Martin | 254 | 5.3 |
| Labour | Karen Szkilnyk | 230 | 4.8 |
| Labour | Chris Wells | 207 | 4.4 |
| Rejected ballots | | 19 | |
| Turnout | | 4,750 | 46.2 |
| Total votes | | 13,528 | |
| Registered electors | | 10,277 | |
| Liberal Democrats win (new seat) | | | |
| Liberal Democrats win (new seat) | | | |
| Liberal Democrats win (new seat) | | | |

=== Bredbury & Woodley ===
Bredbury & Woodley (3)
| Party | Candidate | Votes | % |
|---|---|---|---|
| Labour | Joe Barratt | 1,639 | 43.3 |
| Liberal Democrats | Sue Thorpe | 1,598 | 42.2 |
| Labour | Rosemary Barratt | 1,479 | 39.1 |
| Liberal Democrats | James Epps | 1,390 | 36.7 |
| Liberal Democrats | Dan Willis | 1,388 | 36.7 |
| Labour | Charlotte Price | 1,238 | 32.7 |
| Conservative | Tim Morley | 515 | 13.6 |
| Conservative | Michael Lyons | 480 | 12.7 |
| Conservative | Bernie Wylde | 424 | 11.2 |
| Green | Alex Crompton | 312 | 8.2 |
| Independent | Sue Chatton | 243 | 6.4 |
| Rejected ballots | | 12 | |
| Turnout | | 3,785 | 34.6 |
| Total votes | | 10,706 | |
| Registered electors | | 10,952 | |
| Labour win (new seat) | | | |
| Liberal Democrats win (new seat) | | | |
| Labour win (new seat) | | | |

=== Bredbury Green & Romiley ===
Bredbury Green & Romiley (3)
| Party | Candidate | Votes | % |
|---|---|---|---|
| Liberal Democrats | Lisa Smart | 2,301 | 64.3 |
| Liberal Democrats | Angie Clark | 2,239 | 62.6 |
| Liberal Democrats | Mark Roberts | 2,048 | 57.2 |
| Conservative | Pat Bentley | 607 | 17.0 |
| Conservative | Jane Cannon | 563 | 15.7 |
| Conservative | Maureen Walsh | 559 | 15.6 |
| Labour | Peter Black | 488 | 13.6 |
| Labour | David Colman | 439 | 12.3 |
| Labour | Susan Colman | 399 | 11.1 |
| Green | Stephanie Wyatt | 319 | 8.9 |
| Rejected ballots | | 13 | |
| Turnout | | 3,579 | 34.0 |
| Total votes | | 9,962 | |
| Registered electors | | 10,535 | |
| Liberal Democrats win (new seat) | | | |
| Liberal Democrats win (new seat) | | | |
| Liberal Democrats win (new seat) | | | |

=== Brinnington & Stockport Central ===
Brinnington & Stockport Central (3)
| Party | Candidate | Votes | % |
|---|---|---|---|
| Labour | Christine Carrigan | 1,041 | 66.1 |
| Labour | Kerry Waters | 931 | 59.1 |
| Labour | Karl Wardlaw | 843 | 53.5 |
| Green | Alexander Drury | 282 | 17.9 |
| Conservative | Ros Lloyd | 222 | 14.1 |
| Liberal Democrats | Catrin Barrowcliff | 217 | 13.8 |
| Liberal Democrats | Susan Ingham | 212 | 13.5 |
| Liberal Democrats | Jack Holliss | 142 | 9.0 |
| Rejected ballots | | 18 | |
| Turnout | | 1,575 | 17.6 |
| Total votes | | 3,890 | |
| Registered electors | | 8,950 | |
| Labour win (new seat) | | | |
| Labour win (new seat) | | | |
| Labour win (new seat) | | | |

=== Cheadle East & Cheadle Hulme North ===
Cheadle East & Cheadle Hulme North (3)
| Party | Candidate | Votes | % |
|---|---|---|---|
| Labour Co-op | David Meller | 2,041 | 49.3 |
| Liberal Democrats | Jilly Julian | 1,846 | 44.5 |
| Labour Co-op | Yvonne Guariento | 1,666 | 40.2 |
| Labour Co-op | Mike Hill | 1,586 | 38.3 |
| Liberal Democrats | Brian Hendley | 1,575 | 38.0 |
| Liberal Democrats | Jane O'Neill | 1,408 | 34.0 |
| Conservative | Mike Booth | 449 | 10.8 |
| Conservative | Naveed Khan | 381 | 9.2 |
| Green | Michael Padfield | 377 | 9.1 |
| Conservative | Pat Leck | 368 | 8.9 |
| Rejected ballots | | 15 | |
| Turnout | | 4,144 | 35.9 |
| Total votes | | 11,697 | |
| Registered electors | | 11,533 | |
| Labour Co-op win (new seat) | | | |
| Liberal Democrats win (new seat) | | | |
| Labour Co-op win (new seat) | | | |

=== Cheadle Hulme South ===
Cheadle Hulme South (3)
| Party | Candidate | Votes | % |
|---|---|---|---|
| Liberal Democrats | Mark Hunter | 2,852 | 65.6 |
| Liberal Democrats | Helen Foster-Grime | 2,657 | 61.2 |
| Liberal Democrats | Keith Holloway | 2,405 | 55.4 |
| Conservative | Brian Dougal | 732 | 16.8 |
| Conservative | Michael Evans | 728 | 16.8 |
| Labour | Barry Hawkins | 694 | 16.0 |
| Conservative | Gill Shaw | 631 | 14.5 |
| Labour | Tess McDermott | 509 | 11.7 |
| Green | Andrew O'Shea | 506 | 11.6 |
| Labour | James Pelham | 398 | 9.2 |
| Rejected ballots | | 8 | |
| Turnout | | 4,345 | 36.9 |
| Total votes | | 12,112 | |
| Registered electors | | 11,766 | |
| Liberal Democrats win (new seat) | | | |
| Liberal Democrats win (new seat) | | | |
| Liberal Democrats win (new seat) | | | |

=== Cheadle West & Gatley ===
Cheadle West & Gatley (3)
| Party | Candidate | Votes | % |
|---|---|---|---|
| Liberal Democrats | Clive Greenhalgh | 2,219 | 55.3 |
| Liberal Democrats | Ian Hunter | 2,160 | 53.9 |
| Liberal Democrats | Tom Morrison | 2,018 | 50.3 |
| Conservative | Michael Fox | 832 | 20.7 |
| Conservative | Minara Cook | 759 | 18.9 |
| Conservative | Faria Khan | 690 | 17.2 |
| Labour | Christopher Gleeson | 678 | 16.9 |
| Green | Rayne Barrett | 625 | 15.6 |
| Labour | Elaine Preece | 569 | 14.2 |
| Labour | Themis Kokolakakis | 510 | 12.7 |
| Rejected ballots | | 16 | |
| Turnout | | 4,011 | 35.4 |
| Total votes | | 11,060 | |
| Registered electors | | 11,340 | |
| Liberal Democrats win (new seat) | | | |
| Liberal Democrats win (new seat) | | | |
| Liberal Democrats win (new seat) | | | |

=== Davenport & Cale Green ===
Davenport & Cale Green (3)
| Party | Candidate | Votes | % |
|---|---|---|---|
| Labour | Dickie Davies | 2,165 | 66.9 |
| Labour | Wendy Wild | 1,890 | 58.4 |
| Labour | Janet Mobbs | 1,849 | 57.2 |
| Liberal Democrats | Dominic Wells | 549 | 17.0 |
| Green | Paolo Granelli | 518 | 16.0 |
| Liberal Democrats | Stuart Ardern | 446 | 13.8 |
| Conservative | Nathan Lumb | 427 | 13.2 |
| Liberal Democrats | Bruce Fairbanks | 393 | 12.2 |
| Reform | Dottie Hopkins | 185 | 5.7 |
| Stockport Fights Austerity No to Cuts | John Pearson | 117 | 3.6 |
| Stockport Fights Austerity No to Cuts | Ashley Walker | 116 | 3.6 |
| Rejected ballots | | 7 | |
| Turnout | | 3,234 | 28.3 |
| Total votes | | 8,655 | |
| Registered electors | | 11,418 | |
| Labour win (new seat) | | | |
| Labour win (new seat) | | | |
| Labour win (new seat) | | | |

=== Edgeley ===
Edgeley (3)
| Party | Candidate | Votes | % |
|---|---|---|---|
| Community Association | Matt Wynne | 1,714 | 54.9 |
| Community Association | Leah Taylor | 1,487 | 47.6 |
| Community Association | Asa Caton | 1,461 | 46.8 |
| Labour | Louise Heywood | 1,183 | 37.9 |
| Labour | Georgia Lynott | 1,166 | 37.3 |
| Labour | Rory Leonard | 1,083 | 34.7 |
| Green | Shaughan Rick | 204 | 6.5 |
| Liberal Democrats | Robbie Cowbury | 187 | 6.0 |
| Liberal Democrats | Tracey Whitmore | 155 | 5.0 |
| Liberal Democrats | Ben Traynor | 124 | 4.0 |
| Conservative | Karl Seppman | 106 | 3.4 |
| Rejected ballots | | 9 | |
| Turnout | | 3,123 | 35.0 |
| Total votes | | 8,870 | |
| Registered electors | | 8,917 | |
| Community Association win (new seat) | | | |
| Community Association win (new seat) | | | |
| Community Association win (new seat) | | | |

=== Hazel Grove ===
Hazel Grove (3)
| Party | Candidate | Votes | % |
|---|---|---|---|
| Liberal Democrats | Jake Austin | 1,662 | 48.8 |
| Liberal Democrats | Wendy Meikle | 1,596 | 46.9 |
| Liberal Democrats | Frankie Singleton | 1,458 | 42.8 |
| Conservative | Bill Law | 924 | 27.2 |
| Conservative | Elizabeth Arnold | 891 | 26.2 |
| Conservative | Andrew Baker | 891 | 26.2 |
| Labour | Carl Carrigan | 708 | 20.8 |
| Labour | Linda Paton | 544 | 16.0 |
| Labour | Johnny White | 468 | 13.8 |
| Green | Mary Bullock | 375 | 11.0 |
| Rejected ballots | | 18 | |
| Turnout | | 3,403 | 32.6 |
| Total votes | | 9,517 | |
| Registered electors | | 10,451 | |
| Liberal Democrats win (new seat) | | | |
| Liberal Democrats win (new seat) | | | |
| Liberal Democrats win (new seat) | | | |

=== Heald Green ===
Heald Green (3)
| Party | Candidate | Votes | % |
|---|---|---|---|
| Heald Green Ratepayers | Carole McCann | 1,663 | 45.6 |
| Heald Green Ratepayers | Anna Charles-Jones | 1,625 | 44.6 |
| Heald Green Ratepayers | Catherine Stuart | 1,516 | 41.6 |
| Liberal Democrats | Qasim Ahmed | 988 | 27.1 |
| Liberal Democrats | Gemma Bowker | 893 | 24.5 |
| Liberal Democrats | Iain Roberts | 863 | 23.7 |
| Labour | Kath Priestley | 625 | 17.1 |
| Labour | Colin Owen | 563 | 15.4 |
| Labour | Brian Preece | 442 | 12.1 |
| Conservative | Janice McGahan | 302 | 8.3 |
| Conservative | Yvonne Salmons | 290 | 8.0 |
| Conservative | Oliver Williamson | 237 | 6.5 |
| Green | Chitra Ramachandran | 202 | 5.5 |
| Rejected ballots | | 8 | |
| Turnout | | 3,645 | 33.4 |
| Total votes | | 10,209 | |
| Registered electors | | 10,927 | |
| Heald Green Ratepayers win (new seat) | | | |
| Heald Green Ratepayers win (new seat) | | | |
| Heald Green Ratepayers win (new seat) | | | |

=== Heatons North ===
Heatons North (3)
| Party | Candidate | Votes | % |
|---|---|---|---|
| Labour | David Sedgwick | 2,873 | 67.6 |
| Labour | John Taylor | 2,819 | 66.3 |
| Labour | Dena Ryness | 2,664 | 62.7 |
| Green | Sam Dugdale | 900 | 21.2 |
| Conservative | Hassan Sajjad | 647 | 15.2 |
| Liberal Democrats | Paul Ankers | 386 | 9.1 |
| Women's Equality | Diane Coffey | 384 | 9.0 |
| Liberal Democrats | Jenny Humphreys | 371 | 8.7 |
| Liberal Democrats | Craig Wright | 260 | 6.1 |
| Rejected ballots | | 22 | |
| Turnout | | 4,250 | 38.9 |
| Total votes | | 11,304 | |
| Registered electors | | 10,922 | |
| Labour win (new seat) | | | |
| Labour win (new seat) | | | |
| Labour win (new seat) | | | |

=== Heatons South ===
Heatons South (3)
| Party | Candidate | Votes | % |
|---|---|---|---|
| Labour | Colin Foster | 2,868 | 69.3 |
| Labour | Dean Fitzpatrick | 2,838 | 68.6 |
| Labour | Claire Vibert | 2,582 | 62.4 |
| Green | Sophie Tyrrell | 947 | 22.9 |
| Conservative | Joel Tennuchi | 575 | 13.9 |
| Liberal Democrats | Margaret McDermott | 418 | 10.1 |
| Liberal Democrats | Malcolm Allan | 353 | 8.5 |
| Liberal Democrats | Richard Hardisty | 325 | 7.9 |
| Rejected ballots | | 14 | |
| Turnout | | 4,136 | 38.3 |
| Total votes | | 10,906 | |
| Registered electors | | 10,801 | |
| Labour win (new seat) | | | |
| Labour win (new seat) | | | |
| Labour win (new seat) | | | |

=== Manor ===
Manor (3)
| Party | Candidate | Votes | % |
|---|---|---|---|
| Labour | Laura Clingan | 1,328 | 45.1 |
| Labour | Sue Glithero | 1,280 | 43.5 |
| Labour | Charlie Stewart | 1,152 | 39.1 |
| Liberal Democrats | Micheala Meikle | 1,103 | 37.5 |
| Liberal Democrats | Jamie Hirst | 1,047 | 35.6 |
| Liberal Democrats | Jason Jones | 1,021 | 34.7 |
| Green | Antony Rablen | 270 | 9.2 |
| Conservative | Charlotte Tinné | 233 | 7.9 |
| Independent | Brian Battle | 213 | 7.2 |
| Independent | Chris Murphy | 173 | 5.9 |
| Independent | Andy Sorton | 142 | 4.8 |
| Reform | Stephen Speakman | 130 | 4.4 |
| Rejected ballots | | 9 | |
| Turnout | | 2,945 | 29.2 |
| Total votes | | 8,092 | |
| Registered electors | | 10,071 | |
| Labour win (new seat) | | | |
| Labour win (new seat) | | | |
| Labour win (new seat) | | | |

=== Marple North ===
Marple North (3)
| Party | Candidate | Votes | % |
|---|---|---|---|
| Liberal Democrats | Steven Gribbon | 2,752 | 63.2 |
| Liberal Democrats | Geoff Abell | 2,638 | 60.6 |
| Liberal Democrats | Becky Senior | 2,472 | 56.8 |
| Conservative | Nigel Noble | 766 | 17.6 |
| Green | John Bright | 658 | 15.1 |
| Conservative | Joyce Ebbage | 644 | 14.8 |
| Conservative | Daniel Marchbank | 613 | 14.1 |
| Labour | Sandy Broadhurst | 552 | 12.7 |
| Labour | Craig Hamilton | 430 | 9.9 |
| Labour | Brian Wild | 382 | 8.8 |
| Independent | Steve Hatton | 282 | 6.5 |
| Rejected ballots | | 6 | |
| Turnout | | 4,354 | 45.6 |
| Total votes | | 12,189 | |
| Registered electors | | 9,542 | |
| Liberal Democrats win (new seat) | | | |
| Liberal Democrats win (new seat) | | | |
| Liberal Democrats win (new seat) | | | |

=== Marple South & High Lane ===
Marple South & High Lane (3)
| Party | Candidate | Votes | % |
|---|---|---|---|
| Liberal Democrats | Shan Alexander | 2,168 | 57.4 |
| Liberal Democrats | Aron Thornley | 2,115 | 56.0 |
| Liberal Democrats | Colin MacAlister | 2,069 | 54.8 |
| Conservative | Annette Finnie | 898 | 23.8 |
| Conservative | Andrew Lord | 807 | 21.4 |
| Conservative | William Morley-Scott | 721 | 19.1 |
| Green | Andrew Threlfall | 565 | 15.0 |
| Labour | Mags Hindle | 473 | 12.5 |
| Labour | Peter Towey | 363 | 9.6 |
| Labour | Matthew Whittley | 316 | 8.4 |
| Rejected ballots | | 8 | |
| Turnout | | 3,777 | 38.2 |
| Total votes | | 10,495 | |
| Registered electors | | 9,882 | |
| Liberal Democrats win (new seat) | | | |
| Liberal Democrats win (new seat) | | | |
| Liberal Democrats win (new seat) | | | |

=== Norbury & Woodsmoor ===
Norbury & Woodsmoor (3)
| Party | Candidate | Votes | % |
|---|---|---|---|
| Liberal Democrats | Grace Baynham | 1,944 | 43.8 |
| Liberal Democrats | Dominic Hardwick | 1,936 | 43.7 |
| Liberal Democrats | Pete West | 1,667 | 37.6 |
| Conservative | Oliver Johnstone | 1,581 | 35.7 |
| Conservative | Lisa Walker | 1,273 | 28.7 |
| Conservative | John Wright | 1,270 | 28.6 |
| Labour | Jon Byrne | 820 | 18.5 |
| Labour | Noelle Caruso-Kelly | 789 | 17.8 |
| Labour | Ian Devine | 736 | 16.6 |
| Green | Philip Handscomb | 373 | 8.4 |
| Reform | Lynn Schofield | 113 | 2.5 |
| Rejected ballots | | 8 | |
| Turnout | | 4,434 | 43.9 |
| Total votes | | 12,502 | |
| Registered electors | | 10,110 | |
| Liberal Democrats win (new seat) | | | |
| Liberal Democrats win (new seat) | | | |
| Liberal Democrats win (new seat) | | | |

=== Offerton ===
Offerton (3)
| Party | Candidate | Votes | % |
|---|---|---|---|
| Liberal Democrats | Will Dawson | 1,664 | 44.8 |
| Labour | Helen Hibbert | 1,479 | 39.8 |
| Labour | Will Sharp | 1,431 | 38.6 |
| Liberal Democrats | Oliver Harrison | 1,421 | 38.3 |
| Labour | Pauline Sheaff | 1,338 | 36.0 |
| Liberal Democrats | Mark Weldon | 1,182 | 31.8 |
| Conservative | Michael Butler | 486 | 13.1 |
| Conservative | Sally Bennett | 391 | 10.5 |
| Green | Steve Torley | 377 | 10.2 |
| Conservative | Susan Ward | 270 | 7.3 |
| Reform | John Kelly | 178 | 4.8 |
| Rejected ballots | | 16 | |
| Turnout | | 3,712 | 33.3 |
| Total votes | | 10,217 | |
| Registered electors | | 11,160 | |
| Liberal Democrats win (new seat) | | | |
| Labour win (new seat) | | | |
| Labour win (new seat) | | | |

=== Reddish North ===
Reddish North (3)
| Party | Candidate | Votes | % |
|---|---|---|---|
| Labour | David Wilson | 1,799 | 65.4 |
| Labour | Holly McCormack | 1,632 | 59.3 |
| Labour | Rachel Wise | 1,464 | 53.2 |
| Green | Helena Mellish | 658 | 23.9 |
| Conservative | Bernard Clayton | 412 | 15.0 |
| Women's Equality | Paula King | 297 | 10.8 |
| Liberal Democrats | Patricia Jones | 242 | 8.8 |
| Liberal Democrats | John Pantall | 164 | 6.0 |
| Liberal Democrats | Linda Richardson | 149 | 5.4 |
| Rejected ballots | | 15 | |
| Turnout | | 2,750 | 24.3 |
| Total votes | | 6,817 | |
| Registered electors | | 11,322 | |
| Labour win (new seat) | | | |
| Labour win (new seat) | | | |
| Labour win (new seat) | | | |

=== Reddish South ===
Reddish South (3)
| Party | Candidate | Votes | % |
|---|---|---|---|
| Green | Liz Crix | 2,174 | 56.0 |
| Green | Gary Lawson | 2,042 | 52.6 |
| Green | James Frizzell | 1,989 | 51.2 |
| Labour | Joanna Williams | 1,481 | 38.1 |
| Labour | David White | 1,453 | 37.4 |
| Labour | Paul Wright | 1,195 | 30.8 |
| Conservative | John Bates | 268 | 6.9 |
| Liberal Democrats | Megan Grant | 104 | 2.7 |
| Liberal Democrats | Robert Richardson | 71 | 1.8 |
| Liberal Democrats | June Somekh | 54 | 1.4 |
| Rejected ballots | | 19 | |
| Turnout | | 3,885 | 34.4 |
| Total votes | | 10,831 | |
| Registered electors | | 11,293 | |
| Green win (new seat) | | | |
| Green win (new seat) | | | |
| Green win (new seat) | | | |
