= Stockport Metropolitan Borough Council =

Local government body in England

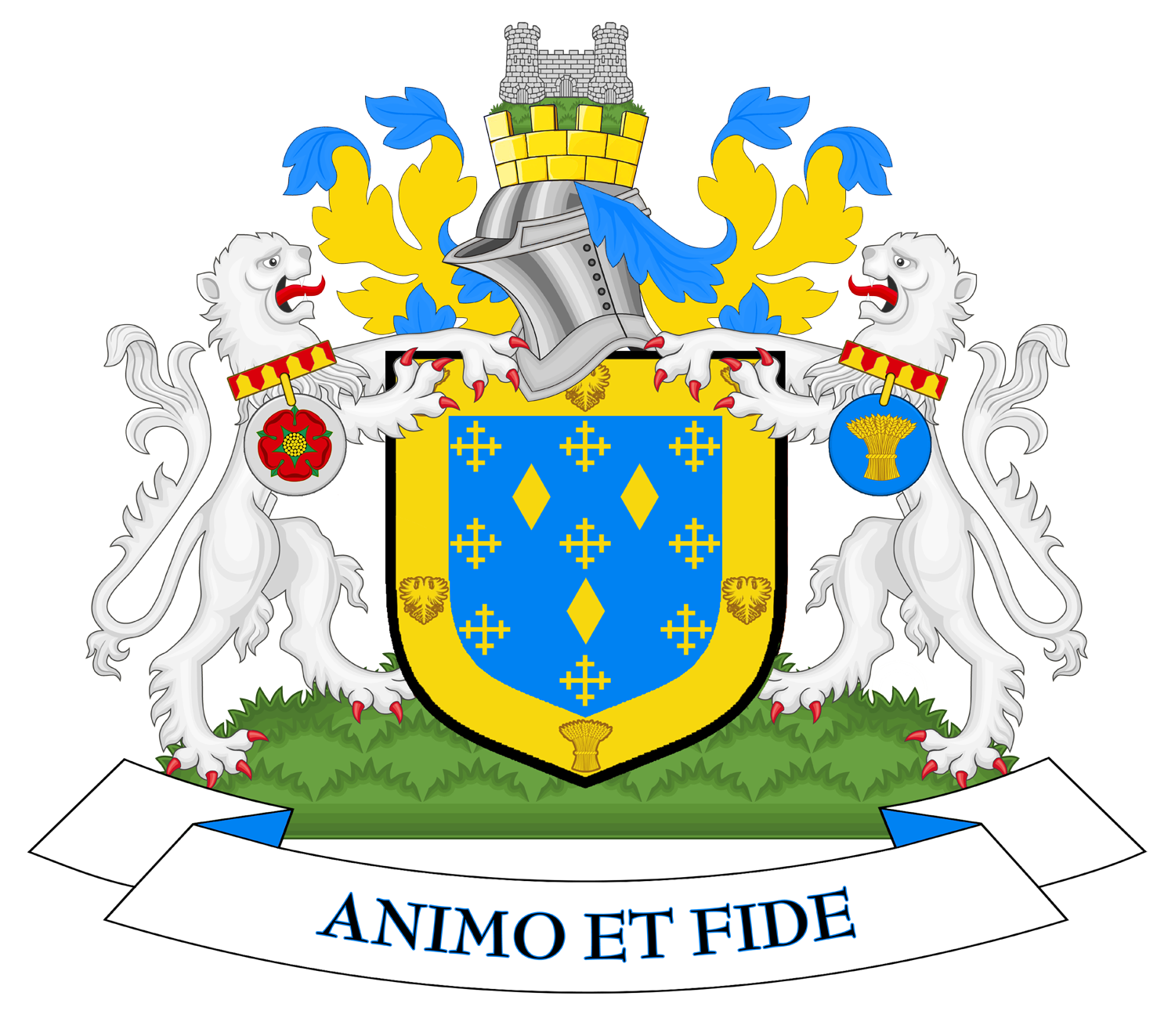

Type
- Type: Metropolitan borough council

Leadership
- Mayor: Mark Hunter, Liberal Democrat since 26 May 2026
- Leader: Mark Roberts, Liberal Democrat since 20 May 2025
- Chief Executive: Michael Cullen since 2024

Structure
- Seats: 63 councillors
- Graph of the party split among 63 seats.
- Political groups: Administration (34) Liberal Democrats (34) Other parties (29) Labour (14) Green (4) Edgeley CA (3) Reform (2) Conservative (1) Independent (5)
- Joint committees: Greater Manchester Combined Authority; Greater Manchester Police, Fire and Crime Panel
- Length of term: 4 years

Elections
- Voting system: First-past-the-post
- Last election: 7 May 2026
- Next election: 6 May 2027

Meeting place
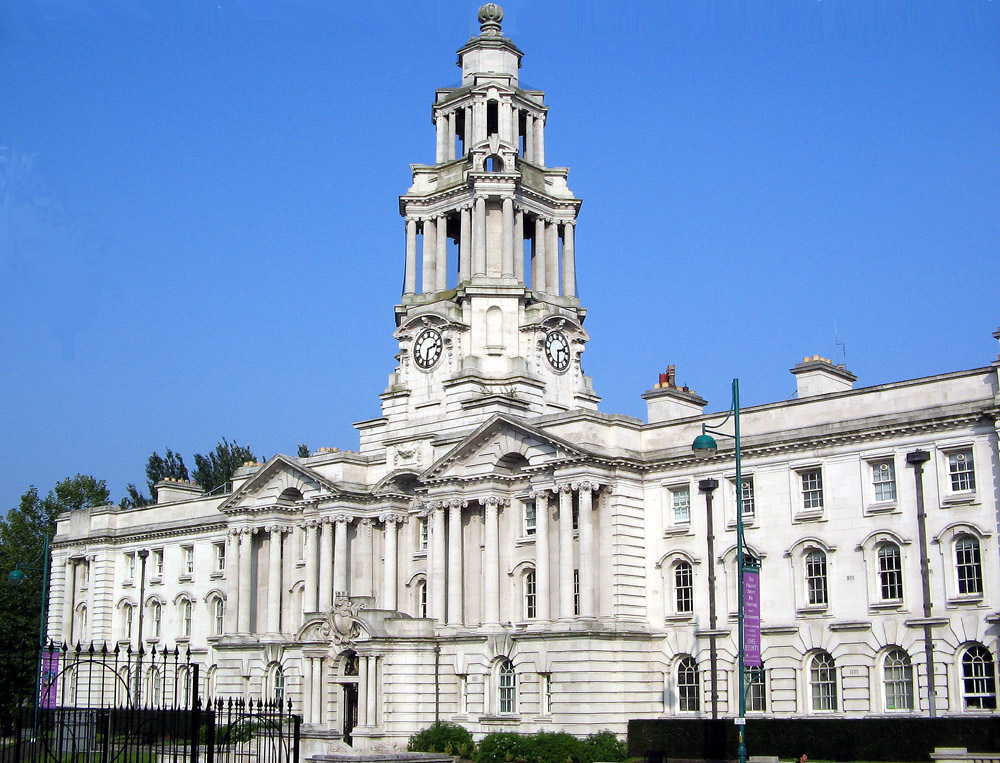
- Town Hall, Wellington Road South, Stockport, SK1 3XE

Website
- stockport.gov.uk

Stockport Metropolitan Borough Council (SMBC), also known as Stockport Council, is the local authority of the Metropolitan Borough of Stockport in Greater Manchester, England. It is a metropolitan borough council and provides the majority of local government services in the borough. The council has been a member of the Greater Manchester Combined Authority since 2011.

The council has been under Liberal Democrat majority control since 2026, with the party having previously run the council in a minority administration since 2022. The council meets at Stockport Town Hall and has additional offices in the adjoining Stopford House and Fred Perry House.

== History ==
The town of Stockport was an ancient borough, having been made a borough during the reign of Henry III (reigned 1216–1272). The original borough was entirely south of the River Mersey in Cheshire. The borough was reformed to become a municipal borough in 1836 under the Municipal Corporations Act 1835, at which point the boundaries were enlarged, with some of the gained area being on the north side of the Mersey in Lancashire; after 1836 the borough therefore straddled the two counties. The municipal borough was governed by a body formally called the 'mayor, aldermen and burgesses of the borough of Stockport', generally known as the corporation, town council or borough council.

When elected county councils were established in 1889, Stockport was considered large enough for its existing council to provide county-level services, and so it was made a county borough, independent from both Cheshire County Council and Lancashire County Council, whilst continuing to straddle the geographical counties of Cheshire and Lancashire. The borough boundaries were enlarged several times.

The larger Metropolitan Borough of Stockport and its council were created in 1974 under the Local Government Act 1972 as one of ten metropolitan districts within the new metropolitan county of Greater Manchester. The first election was held in 1973. For its first year the council acted as a shadow authority alongside the area's five outgoing authorities, being the borough council of Stockport and the urban district councils of Bredbury and Romiley, Cheadle and Gatley, Hazel Grove and Bramhall, and Marple. The new metropolitan district and its council formally came into being on 1 April 1974, at which point the old districts and their councils were abolished.

The metropolitan district was awarded borough status from its creation, allowing the chair of the council to take the title of mayor, continuing Stockport's series of mayors.

From 1974 until 1986 the council was a lower-tier authority, with upper-tier functions provided by the Greater Manchester County Council. The county council was abolished in 1986, under the Local Government Act 1985, and its functions passed to Greater Manchester's 10 borough councils, including Stockport, with some services provided through joint committees.

Since 2011 the council has been a member of the Greater Manchester Combined Authority, which has been led by the directly elected Mayor of Greater Manchester since 2017. The combined authority provides strategic leadership and co-ordination for certain functions across Greater Manchester, notably regarding transport and town planning, but Stockport Metropolitan Borough Council continues to be responsible for most local government functions.

== Governance ==
The council provides metropolitan borough services. Some strategic functions in the area are provided by the Greater Manchester Combined Authority; the leader of Stockport Council sits on the combined authority as Stockport's representative. There are no civil parishes in the borough.

=== Political control ===
Stockport has been under Liberal Democrat majority control since 2026, having led the council under a minority administration since 2022,

Political control of the council since the 1974 reforms took effect has been as follows:

Party in control	Years
No overall control	1974–1975
Conservative	1975–1983
No overall control	1983–1999
Liberal Democrats	1999–2000
No overall control	2000–2002
Liberal Democrats	2002–2011
No overall control	2011–2026
Liberal Democrats	2026–present

=== Leadership ===
The role of mayor is largely ceremonial in Stockport. Political leadership is instead provided by the leader of the council. The leaders since 1974 have been:

Councillor	Party	From	To
Walter Knight	Conservative	1 Apr 1974	26 Dec 1976
John Howe	Conservative	Jan 1977	May 1978
John Lloyd	Conservative	May 1978	May 1984
(no leader) (Note: During this period when no formal leader was appointed, the most senior political position on the council was the chair of the policy and resources committee. The leader chaired that committee prior to 1984 and after 1996. The chairs of the policy and resources committee whilst there was no formally appointed leader were: John Lloyd, Conservative, May 1984 to May 1986 (who had been leader 1978 to 1984).; John Needham, Conservative, May 1986 to 1989.; Eric Kime, Liberal Democrat, 1989 to 1992.; Fred Ridley, Liberal Democrat, 1992 to 1996 (when he became leader).; When Ridley stood down as leader in 2002 he was described as having led the council for ten years.)		May 1984	14 May 1996
Fred Ridley	Liberal Democrats	14 May 1996	May 2002
Mark Hunter	Liberal Democrats	14 May 2002	18 Aug 2005
Brian Millard	Liberal Democrats	18 Aug 2005	22 May 2007
Dave Goddard	Liberal Democrats	22 May 2007	May 2012
Sue Derbyshire	Liberal Democrats	22 May 2012	May 2016
Alex Ganotis	Labour	24 May 2016	21 May 2019
Elise Wilson	Labour	21 May 2019	19 May 2022
Mark Hunter	Liberal Democrats	19 May 2022	20 May 2025
Mark Roberts	Liberal Democrats	20 May 2025	incumbent

=== Composition ===
Following the 2026 election, and a subsequent change of allegiance later in May 2026, the composition of the council was:

Party	Seats
Liberal Democrats	34
Labour	14
Green	4
Edgeley Community Association	3
Reform	2
Conservative	1
Independent	5
Total	63

Three of the independent councillors sit together as the "Independent Ratepayers" group; those three are all sponsored by the Heald Green Ratepayers, which is not formally registered as a political party with the Electoral Commission. The Edgeley Community Association and one of the independent councillors sit together as the "Stockport Community Group". The other independent councillor is not aligned to a group. The next election is due in May 2027.

== Elections ==
Since the last boundary changes in 2023, the council has comprised 63 councillors representing 21 wards, with each ward electing three councillors. Elections are held three years out of every four, with a third of the council (one councillor for each ward) elected each time for a four-year term of office.

== Wards and councillors ==
Ward	Councillor	Party	Term of office
Bramhall North	Mark Jones	Liberal Democrats	2023–27
Bramhall North	Alex Wynne	Liberal Democrats	2024–28
Bramhall North	Taya Clarke	Liberal Democrats	2026–30
Bramhall South and Woodford	Peter Crossen	Conservative	2024–27 (Note: Elected in a by-election.)
Bramhall South and Woodford	Jeremy Meal	Liberal Democrats	2024–28
Bramhall South and Woodford	Dallas Jones	Liberal Democrats	2026–30
Bredbury and Woodley	Joe Barratt	Liberal Democrats (Note: Elected as a Labour councillor but resigned to sit as an independent in September 2025, then joined the Liberal Democrats in May 2026.)	2023–27
Bredbury and Woodley	Rosemary Barratt	Independent (Note: Elected as a Labour councillor but resigned to sit as an independent in September 2025.)	2024–28
Bredbury and Woodley	Niki Meerman	Liberal Democrats	2026–30
Bredbury Green and Romiley	Rachel Bresnahan	Liberal Democrats	2024–27
Bredbury Green and Romiley	Mark Roberts	Liberal Democrats	2024–28
Bredbury Green and Romiley	Angie Clark	Liberal Democrats	2026–30
Brinnington and Stockport Central	Christine Carrigan	Labour Co-op	2023–27
Brinnington and Stockport Central	Karl Wardlaw	Labour	2024–28
Brinnington and Stockport Central	Shaun Regan	Reform	2026–30
Cheadle East and Cheadle Hulme North	David Meller	Labour Co-op	2023–27
Cheadle East and Cheadle Hulme North	Mike Newman	Liberal Democrats	2024–28
Cheadle East and Cheadle Hulme North	Jilly Julian	Liberal Democrats	2026–30
Cheadle Hulme South	Mark Hunter	Liberal Democrats	2023–27
Cheadle Hulme South	Keith Holloway	Liberal Democrats	2024–28
Cheadle Hulme South	Helen Foster-Grime	Liberal Democrats	2026–30
Cheadle West and Gatley	Clive Greenhalgh	Liberal Democrats	2023–27
Cheadle West and Gatley	Huma Khan	Liberal Democrats	2024–28
Cheadle West and Gatley	Ian Hunter	Liberal Democrats	2026–30
Davenport and Cale Green	Dickie Davies	Labour	2023–27
Davenport and Cale Green	Paul Wright	Labour	2024–28
Davenport and Cale Green	Alice Delemare	Liberal Democrats	2026–30
Edgeley	Matt Wynne	Community Association	2023–27
Edgeley	Asa Caton	Community Association	2024–28
Edgeley	Jess Meller	Community Association	2023–26
Hazel Grove	Jake Austin	Liberal Democrats	2023–27
Hazel Grove	Frankie Singleton	Liberal Democrats	2024–28
Hazel Grove	Wendy Meikle	Liberal Democrats	2026–30
Heald Green	Carole McCann	Independent (Note: Sponsored by Heald Green Ratepayers)	2023–27
Heald Green	Catherine Stuart	Independent	2024–28
Heald Green	Anna Charles-Jones	Independent	2026–30
Heatons North	David Sedgwick	Independent (Note: Elected as a Labour councillor but resigned to sit as an independent in February 2025.)	2023–27
Heatons North	Dena Ryness	Labour Co-op	2024–28
Heatons North	Jo Williams	Labour	2026–30
Heatons South	Colin Foster	Labour	2023–27
Heatons South	Claire Vibert	Labour Co-op	2024–28
Heatons South	Dean Fitzpatrick	Labour	2026–30
Manor	Laura Clingan	Labour	2023–27
Manor	Jon Byrne	Labour	2024–28
Manor	Brian Battle	Reform	2026–30
Marple North	Steve Gribbon	Liberal Democrats	2023–27
Marple North	Micheala Meikle	Liberal Democrats	2024–28
Marple North	Megan Axon	Liberal Democrats	2026–30
Marple South and High Lane	Shan Alexander	Liberal Democrats	2023–27
Marple South and High Lane	Colin MacAlister	Liberal Democrats	2024–28
Marple South and High Lane	Dominic Warner	Liberal Democrats	2026–30
Norbury and Woodsmoor	Grace Baynham	Liberal Democrats	2023–27
Norbury and Woodsmoor	Pete West	Liberal Democrats	2024–28
Norbury and Woodsmoor	Dominic Hardwick	Liberal Democrats	2026–30
Offerton	Will Dawson	Liberal Democrats	2023–27
Offerton	Dan Oliver	Liberal Democrats	2024–28
Offerton	Jamie Hirst	Liberal Democrats	2026–30
Reddish North	David Wilson	Labour	2023–27
Reddish North	Rachel Wise	Labour Co-op	2024–28
Reddish North	David White	Green	2026–30
Reddish South	Liz Crix	Green	2023–27
Reddish South	James Frizzell	Green	2024–28
Reddish South	Laura Smith	Green	2026–30

== Structure ==
The council uses a leader and cabinet system. There are eight cabinet members, including the leader of the council; each has a separate portfolio containing responsibilities for different services and areas of the council. There are also six scrutiny committees which scrutinise decisions made by the cabinet. The cabinet of the consists of eight councillors:

- Leader of the Council: Mark Roberts
- Finance and Resources: Jilly Julian (Deputy leader)
- Housing and Environment: Jake Austin
- Parks, Highways & Transport Services: Grace Baynham
- Health, Wellbeing and Adult Social Care: Helen Foster-Grime
- Economy, Regeneration & Skills: Micheala Meikle
- Children, Families & Education: Wendy Meikle
- Communities, Culture & Public Protection: Dan Oliver

== Premises ==
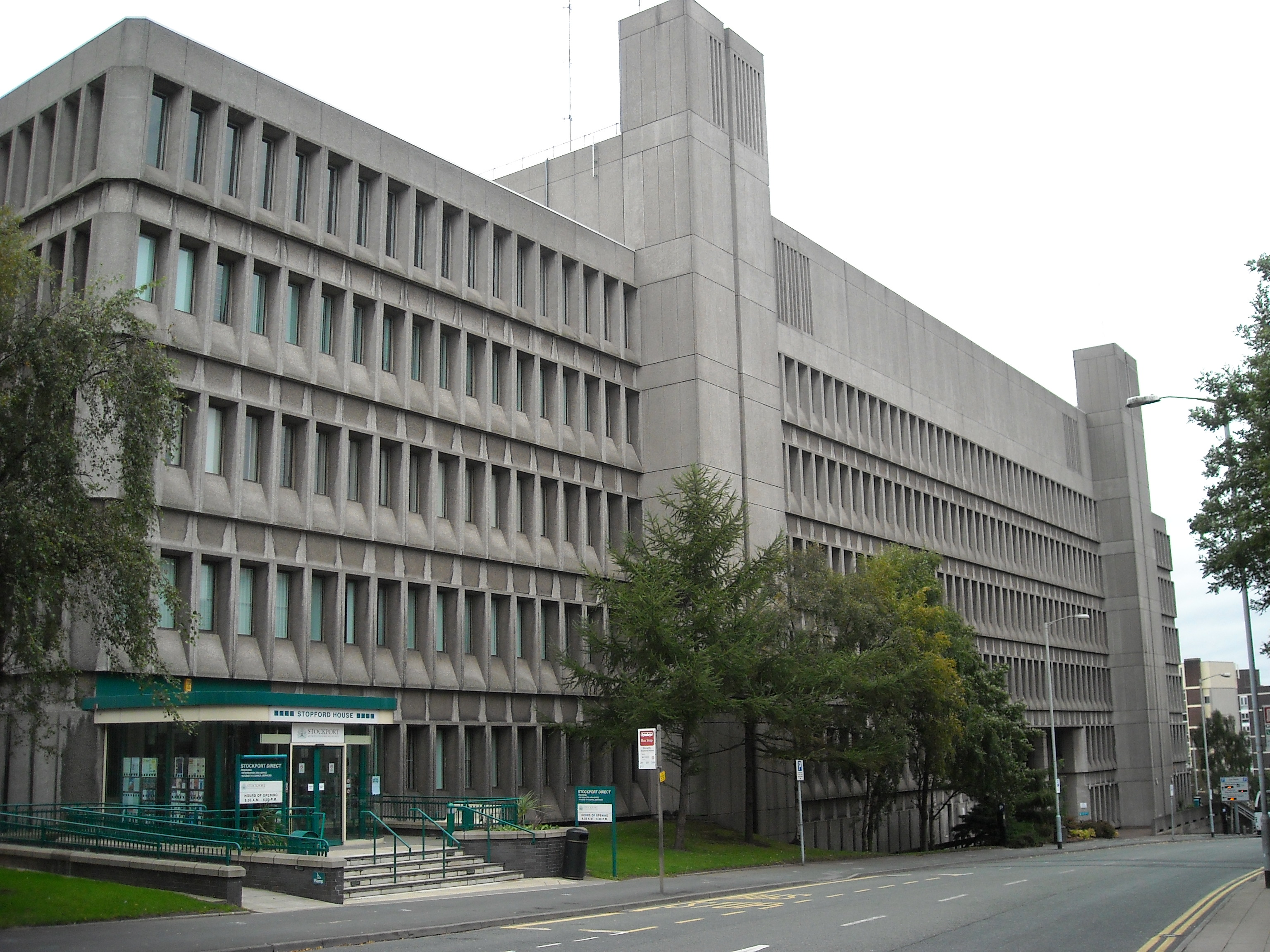
Stopford House, Piccadilly, Stockport, SK1 3XE: Council offices, incorporating the main public reception

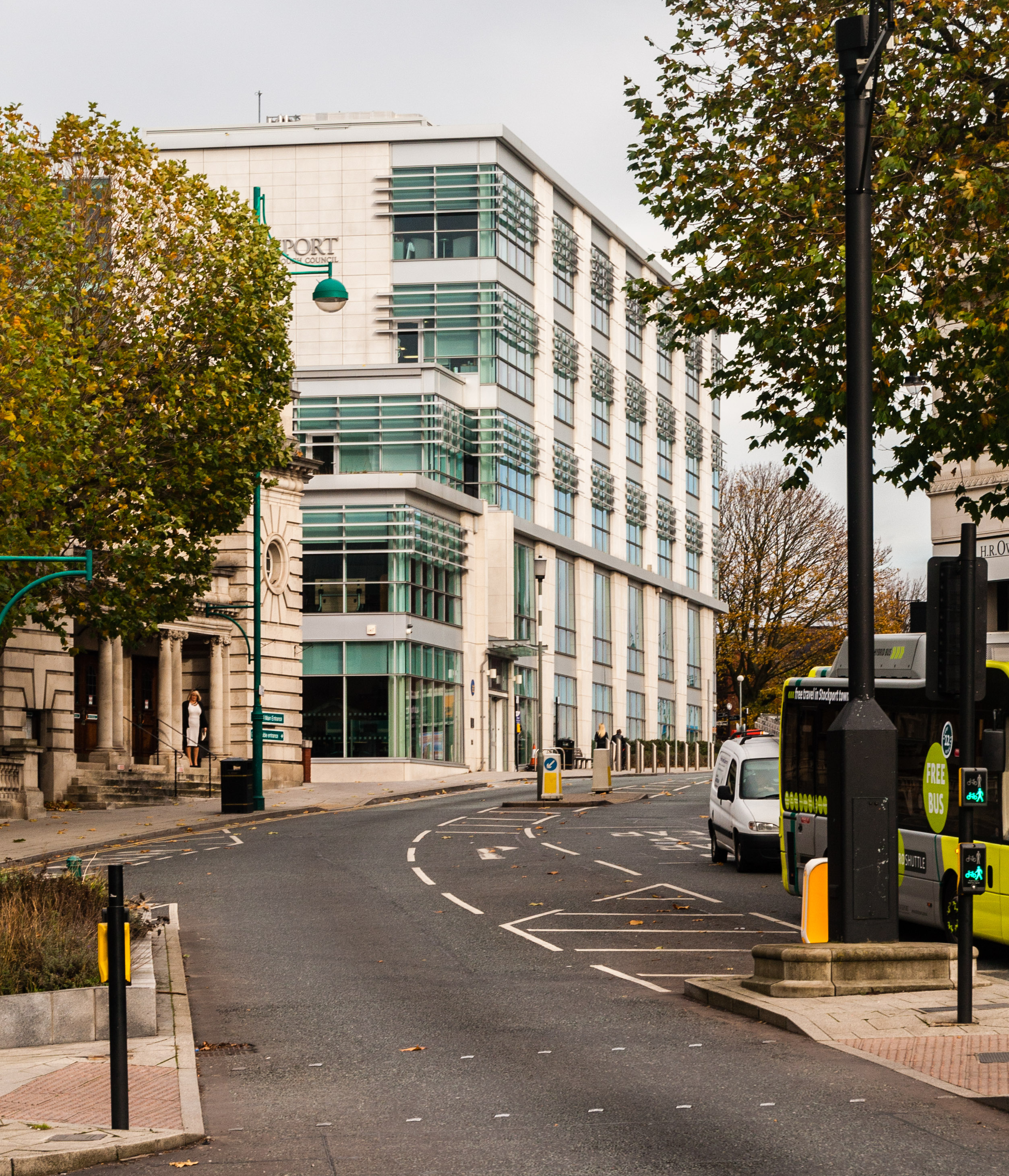
Fred Perry House, Edward Street

Full council meetings are held at Stockport Town Hall on Wellington Road South, which had been completed in 1908 for the old Stockport Borough Council. An additional office block called Stopford House was built on Piccadilly (backing onto the Town Hall) in 1975. Another adjoining office building called Fred Perry House on Edward Street was completed in 2011, named after tennis player Fred Perry (1909–1995) who was from Stockport.
