= List of MPs for constituencies in England (2005–2010) =

This is a list of members of Parliament (MPs) elected to the House of Commons by constituencies in England for the Fifty-Fourth Parliament of the United Kingdom (2005 to 2010).

It includes both MPs elected at the 2005 general election, held on 5 May 2005, and those subsequently elected in by-elections.

The list is sorted by the name of the MP, and MPs who did not serve throughout the Parliament are italicised. New MPs elected since the general election are noted at the bottom of the page.

== Full composition before 2010 election ==
Affiliation	Members
Labour Party	280
Conservative Party	205
Liberal Democrats	47
Respect Party	1
Total	533

== MPs in the East of England region ==
Affiliation	Members
Conservative Party	40
Liberal Democrats	3
Labour Party	13
Total	58

== Total MPs ==
MP	Constituency	Party	Notes
Diane Abbott	Hackney North and Stoke Newington	Labour	
Adam Afriyie	Windsor	Conservative	
Bob Ainsworth	Coventry North East	Labour	
Peter Ainsworth	East Surrey	Conservative	
Graham Allen	Nottingham North	Labour	
David Amess	Southend West	Conservative	
Michael Ancram	Devizes	Conservative	
David Anderson	Blaydon	Labour	
Janet Anderson	Rossendale and Darwen	Labour	
James Arbuthnot	North East Hampshire	Conservative	
Hilary Armstrong	North West Durham	Labour	
Charlotte Atkins	Staffordshire Moorlands	Labour	
Peter Atkinson	Hexham	Conservative	
Ian Austin	Dudley North	Labour	
John Austin	Erith and Thamesmead	Labour	
Richard Bacon	South Norfolk	Conservative	
Adrian Bailey	West Bromwich West	Labour	
Vera Baird	Redcar	Labour	
Norman Baker	Lewes	Liberal Democrat	
Tony Baldry	Banbury	Conservative	
Ed Balls	Normanton	Labour	
Gregory Barker	Bexhill and Battle	Conservative	
Celia Barlow	Hove	Labour	
John Baron	Billericay	Conservative	
Kevin Barron	Rother Valley	Labour	
John Battle	Leeds West	Labour	
Hugh Bayley	York, City of	Labour	
Margaret Beckett	Derby South	Labour	
Alan Beith	Berwick-upon-Tweed	Liberal Democrat	
Sir Stuart Bell	Middlesbrough	Labour	
Henry Bellingham	North West Norfolk	Conservative	
Hilary Benn	Leeds Central	Labour	
Joe Benton	Bootle	Labour	
Richard Benyon	Newbury	Conservative	
John Bercow	Buckingham	Conservative	
Sir Paul Beresford	Mole Valley	Conservative	
Roger Berry	Kingswood	Labour	
Clive Betts	Sheffield Attercliffe	Labour	
Brian Binley	Northampton South	Conservative	
Liz Blackman	Erewash	Labour	
Roberta Blackman-Woods	Durham, City of	Labour	
Tony Blair	Sedgefield	Labour	Resigned 27 June 2007
Hazel Blears	Salford	Labour	
Bob Blizzard	Waveney	Labour	
David Blunkett	Sheffield Brightside	Labour	
Crispin Blunt	Reigate	Conservative	
Peter Bone	Wellingborough	Conservative	
David Borrow	South Ribble	Labour	
Tim Boswell	Daventry	Conservative	
Peter Bottomley	Worthing West	Conservative	
Ben Bradshaw	Exeter	Labour	
Graham Brady	Altrincham and Sale West	Conservative	
Tom Brake	Carshalton and Wallington	Liberal Democrat	
Julian Brazier	Canterbury	Conservative	
Colin Breed	South East Cornwall	Liberal Democrat	
James Brokenshire	Hornchurch	Conservative	
Annette Brooke	Mid Dorset and North Poole	Liberal Democrat	
Lyn Brown	West Ham	Labour	
Nick Brown	Newcastle upon Tyne East and Wallsend	Labour	
Jeremy Browne	Taunton	Liberal Democrat	
Angela Browning	Tiverton and Honiton	Conservative	
Karen Buck	Regent's Park and Kensington North	Labour	
Richard Burden	Birmingham, Northfield	Labour	
Colin Burgon	Elmet	Labour	
Andy Burnham	Leigh	Labour	
Simon Burns	Chelmsford West	Conservative	
David Burrowes	Enfield Southgate	Conservative	
Paul Burstow	Sutton and Cheam	Liberal Democrat	
Alistair Burt	North East Bedfordshire	Conservative	
Lorely Burt	Solihull	Liberal Democrat	
Dawn Butler	Brent South	Labour	
John Butterfill	Bournemouth West	Conservative	
Stephen Byers	North Tyneside	Labour	
Liam Byrne	Birmingham, Hodge Hill	Labour	
Dr Vincent Cable	Twickenham	Liberal Democrat	
Richard Caborn	Sheffield Central	Labour	
Patsy Calton	Cheadle	Liberal Democrat	Died 29 May 2005
David Cameron	Witney	Conservative	
Alan Campbell	Tynemouth	Labour	
Ronnie Campbell	Blyth Valley	Labour	
Douglas Carswell	Harwich	Conservative	
William Cash	Stone	Conservative	
Ian Cawsey	Brigg and Goole	Labour	
Colin Challen	Morley and Rothwell	Labour	
Ben Chapman	Wirral South	Labour	
David Chaytor	Bury North	Labour	
Christopher Chope	Christchurch	Conservative	
Michael Clapham	Barnsley West and Penistone	Labour	
James Clappison	Hertsmere	Conservative	
Greg Clark	Tunbridge Wells	Conservative	
Paul Clark	Gillingham	Labour	
Charles Clarke	Norwich South	Labour	
Kenneth Clarke	Rushcliffe	Conservative	
Nicholas Clegg	Sheffield Hallam	Liberal Democrat	
David Clelland	Tyne Bridge	Labour	
Geoffrey Clifton-Brown	Cotswold	Conservative	
Vernon Coaker	Gedling	Labour	
Ann Coffey	Stockport	Labour	
Harry Cohen	Leyton and Wanstead	Labour	
Derek Conway	Old Bexley and Sidcup	Conservative	
Frank Cook	Stockton North	Labour	
Rosie Cooper	West Lancashire	Labour	
Yvette Cooper	Pontefract and Castleford	Labour	
Jeremy Corbyn	Islington North	Labour	
Sir Patrick Cormack	South Staffordshire	Conservative	
Jim Cousins	Newcastle upon Tyne Central	Labour	
Geoffrey Cox	Torridge and West Devon	Conservative	
David Crausby	Bolton North East	Labour	
Mary Creagh	Wakefield	Labour	
Jon Cruddas	Dagenham	Labour	
Ann Cryer	Keighley	Labour	
John Cummings	Easington	Labour	
Jim Cunningham	Coventry South	Labour	
Tony Cunningham	Workington	Labour	
David Curry	Skipton and Ripon	Conservative	
Claire Curtis-Thomas	Crosby	Labour	
Edward Davey	Kingston and Surbiton	Liberal Democrat	
Philip Davies	Shipley	Conservative	
Quentin Davies	Grantham and Stamford	Labour Party	Elected as a Conservative
David Davis	Haltemprice and Howden	Conservative	
Janet Dean	Burton	Labour	
John Denham	Southampton Itchen	Labour	
Parmjit Dhanda	Gloucester	Labour	
Andrew Dismore	Hendon	Labour	
Jonathan Djanogly	Huntingdon	Conservative	
Jim Dobbin	Heywood and Middleton	Labour	
Frank Dobson	Holborn and St Pancras	Labour	
Stephen Dorrell	Charnwood	Conservative	
Nadine Dorries	Mid Bedfordshire	Conservative	
Jim Dowd	Lewisham West	Labour	
David Drew	Stroud	Labour	
James Duddridge	Rochford and Southend East	Conservative	
Alan Duncan	Rutland and Melton	Conservative	
Philip Dunne	Ludlow	Conservative	
Gwyneth Dunwoody	Crewe and Nantwich	Labour	Died 17 April 2008
Angela Eagle	Wallasey	Labour	
Maria Eagle	Liverpool Garston	Labour	
Clive Efford	Eltham	Labour	
Louise Ellman	Liverpool Riverside	Labour	
Tobias Ellwood	Bournemouth East	Conservative	
Natascha Engel	North East Derbyshire	Labour	
Jeff Ennis	Barnsley East and Mexborough	Labour	
Bill Etherington	Sunderland North	Labour	
Nigel Evans	Ribble Valley	Conservative	
David Evennett	Bexleyheath and Crayford	Conservative	
Michael Fabricant	Lichfield	Conservative	
Michael Fallon	Sevenoaks	Conservative	
Paul Farrelly	Newcastle-under-Lyme	Labour	
Tim Farron	Westmorland and Lonsdale	Liberal Democrat	
Lynne Featherstone	Hornsey and Wood Green	Liberal Democrat	
Frank Field	Birkenhead	Labour	
Mark Field	London and Westminster, Cities of	Conservative	
Mark Fisher	Stoke-on-Trent Central	Labour	
Jim Fitzpatrick	Poplar and Canning Town	Labour	
Robert Flello	Stoke-on-Trent South	Labour	
Caroline Flint	Don Valley	Labour	
Barbara Follett	Stevenage	Labour	
Eric Forth	Bromley and Chislehurst	Conservative	Died 17 May 2006
Don Foster	Bath	Liberal Democrat	
Michael Foster	Hastings and Rye	Labour	
Michael Foster	Worcester	Labour	
Liam Fox	Woodspring	Conservative	
Mark Francois	Rayleigh	Conservative	
Christopher Fraser	South West Norfolk	Conservative	
Roger Gale	North Thanet	Conservative	
George Galloway	Bethnal Green and Bow	RESPECT	
Mike Gapes	Ilford South	Labour	
Barry Gardiner	Brent North	Labour	
Edward Garnier	Harborough	Conservative	
David Gauke	South West Hertfordshire	Conservative	
Geoff Hoon	Ashfield	Labour	
Andrew George	St Ives	Liberal Democrat	
Bruce George	Walsall South	Labour	
Neil Gerrard	Walthamstow	Labour	
Nick Gibb	Bognor Regis and Littlehampton	Conservative	
Dr Ian Gibson	Norwich North	Labour	
Sandra Gidley	Romsey	Liberal Democrat	
Cheryl Gillan	Chesham and Amersham	Conservative	
Linda Gilroy	Plymouth Sutton	Labour	
Roger Godsiff	Birmingham, Sparkbrook and Small Heath	Labour	
Paul Goggins	Wythenshawe and Sale East	Labour	
Julia Goldsworthy	Falmouth and Camborne	Liberal Democrat	
Helen Goodman	Bishop Auckland	Labour	
Paul Goodman	Wycombe	Conservative	
Robert Goodwill	Scarborough and Whitby	Conservative	
Michael Gove	Surrey Heath	Conservative	
James Gray	North Wiltshire	Conservative	
Chris Grayling	Epsom and Ewell	Conservative	
Damian Green	Ashford	Conservative	
Justine Greening	Putney	Conservative	
John Greenway	Ryedale	Conservative	
Dominic Grieve	Beaconsfield	Conservative	
John Grogan	Selby	Labour	
John Gummer	Suffolk Coastal	Conservative	
Andrew Gwynne	Denton and Reddish	Labour	
William Hague	Richmond, North Yorkshire	Conservative	
Mike Hall	Weaver Vale	Labour	
Patrick Hall	Bedford	Labour	
Fabian Hamilton	Leeds North East	Labour	
Philip Hammond	Runnymede and Weybridge	Conservative	
Stephen Hammond	Wimbledon	Conservative	
Mike Hancock	Portsmouth South	Liberal Democrat	
Greg Hands	Hammersmith and Fulham	Conservative	
Harriet Harman	Camberwell and Peckham	Labour	
Mark Harper	Forest of Dean	Conservative	
Dr Evan Harris	Oxford West and Abingdon	Liberal Democrat	
Nick Harvey	North Devon	Liberal Democrat	
Sir Alan Haselhurst	Saffron Walden	Conservative	
John Hayes	South Holland and The Deepings	Conservative	
Sylvia Heal	Halesowen and Rowley Regis	Labour	
Oliver Heald	North East Hertfordshire	Conservative	
John Healey	Wentworth	Labour	
David Heath	Somerton and Frome	Liberal Democrat	
David Heathcoat-Amory	Wells	Conservative	
John Hemming	Birmingham, Yardley	Liberal Democrat	
Doug Henderson	Newcastle upon Tyne North	Labour	
Mark Hendrick	Preston	Labour	
Charles Hendry	Wealden	Conservative	
Stephen Hepburn	Jarrow	Labour	
John Heppell	Nottingham East	Labour	
Nick Herbert	Arundel and South Downs	Conservative	
Stephen Hesford	Wirral West	Labour	
Patricia Hewitt	Leicester West	Labour	
David Heyes	Ashton-under-Lyne	Labour	
Keith Hill	Streatham	Labour	
Meg Hillier	Hackney South and Shoreditch	Labour	
Mark Hoban	Fareham	Conservative	
Margaret Hodge	Barking	Labour	
Sharon Hodgson	Gateshead East and Washington West	Labour	
Kate Hoey	Vauxhall	Labour	
Douglas Hogg	Sleaford and North Hykeham	Conservative	
Philip Hollobone	Kettering	Conservative	
Adam Holloway	Gravesham	Conservative	
Paul Holmes	Chesterfield	Liberal Democrat	
Phil Hope	Corby	Labour	
Kelvin Hopkins	Luton North	Labour	
John Horam	Orpington	Conservative	
Martin Horwood	Cheltenham	Liberal Democrat	
Michael Howard	Folkestone and Hythe	Conservative	
David Howarth	Cambridge	Liberal Democrat	
George Howarth	Knowsley North and Sefton East	Labour	
Gerald Howarth	Aldershot	Conservative	
Lindsay Hoyle	Chorley	Labour	
Beverley Hughes	Stretford and Urmston	Labour	
Simon Hughes	North Southwark and Bermondsey	Liberal Democrat	
Chris Huhne	Eastleigh	Liberal Democrat	
Joan Humble	Blackpool North and Fleetwood	Labour	
Jeremy Hunt	South West Surrey	Conservative	
Mark Hunter	Cheadle	Liberal Democrat	Elected in 2005 by-election
Nick Hurd	Ruislip-Northwood	Conservative	
John Hutton	Barrow and Furness	Labour	
Dr Brian Iddon	Bolton South East	Labour	
Eric Illsley	Barnsley Central	Labour	
Michael Jack	Fylde	Conservative	
Glenda Jackson	Hampstead and Highgate	Labour	
Stewart Jackson	Peterborough	Conservative	
Bernard Jenkin	North Essex	Conservative	
Brian Jenkins	Tamworth	Labour	
Alan Johnson	Kingston upon Hull West and Hessle	Labour	
Boris Johnson	Henley	Conservative	
Diana Johnson	Kingston upon Hull North	Labour	
Helen Jones	Warrington North	Labour	
Kevan Jones	North Durham	Labour	
Dr Lynne Jones	Birmingham, Selly Oak	Labour	
Tessa Jowell	Dulwich and West Norwood	Labour	
Gerald Kaufman	Manchester Gorton	Labour	
Daniel Kawczynski	Shrewsbury and Atcham	Conservative	
Sally Keeble	Northampton North	Labour	
Barbara Keeley	Worsley	Labour	
Alan Keen	Feltham and Heston	Labour	
Ann Keen	Brentford and Isleworth	Labour	
Paul Keetch	Hereford	Liberal Democrat	
Ruth Kelly	Bolton West	Labour	
Fraser Kemp	Houghton and Washington East	Labour	
Jane Kennedy	Liverpool Wavertree	Labour	
Robert Key	Salisbury	Conservative	
Piara Singh Khabra	Ealing Southall	Labour	Died 19 June 2007
Sadiq Khan	Tooting	Labour	
David Kidney	Stafford	Labour	
Peter Kilfoyle	Liverpool Walton	Labour	
Julie Kirkbride	Bromsgrove	Conservative	
Greg Knight	East Yorkshire	Conservative	
Jim Knight	South Dorset	Labour	
Susan Kramer	Richmond Park	Liberal Democrat	
Dr Ashok Kumar	Middlesbrough South and East Cleveland	Labour	Died 15 March 2010
Dr Stephen Ladyman	South Thanet	Labour	
Eleanor Laing	Epping Forest	Conservative	
Jacqui Lait	Beckenham	Conservative	
Norman Lamb	North Norfolk	Liberal Democrat	
David Lammy	Tottenham	Labour	
Mark Lancaster	North East Milton Keynes	Conservative	
Andrew Lansley	South Cambridgeshire	Conservative	
David Laws	Yeovil	Liberal Democrat	
Bob Laxton	Derby North	Labour	
John Leech	Manchester Withington	Liberal Democrat	
Edward Leigh	Gainsborough	Conservative	
David Lepper	Brighton Pavilion	Labour	
Oliver Letwin	West Dorset	Conservative	
High Peak	Levitt, Tom	Labour	
Ivan Lewis	Bury South	Labour	
Dr Julian Lewis	New Forest East	Conservative	
Ian Liddell-Grainger	Bridgwater	Conservative	
David Lidington	Aylesbury	Conservative	
Peter Lilley	Hitchin and Harpenden	Conservative	
Martin Linton	Battersea	Labour	
Tony Lloyd	Manchester Central	Labour	
Sir Michael Lord	Central Suffolk and North Ipswich	Conservative	
Tim Loughton	East Worthing and Shoreham	Conservative	
Andy Love	Edmonton	Labour	
Peter Luff	Mid Worcestershire	Conservative	
Andrew MacKay	Bracknell	Conservative	
Dr Denis MacShane	Rotherham	Labour	
Andrew Mackinlay	Thurrock	Labour	
David Maclean	Penrith and The Border	Conservative	
Fiona Mactaggart	Slough	Labour	
Khalid Mahmood	Birmingham, Perry Barr	Labour	
Anne Main	St Albans	Conservative	
Shahid Malik	Dewsbury	Labour	
Humfrey Malins	Woking	Conservative	
Judy Mallaber	Amber Valley	Labour	
John Mann	Bassetlaw	Labour	
John Maples	Stratford-on-Avon	Conservative	
Rob Marris	Wolverhampton South West	Labour	
Gordon Marsden	Blackpool South	Labour	
Robert Marshall-Andrews	Medway	Labour	
Eric Martlew	Carlisle	Labour	
Michael Mates	East Hampshire	Conservative	
Francis Maude	Horsham	Conservative	
Theresa May	Maidenhead	Conservative	
Stephen McCabe	Birmingham, Hall Green	Labour	
Christine McCafferty	Calder Valley	Labour	
Kerry McCarthy	Bristol East	Labour	
Sarah McCarthy-Fry	Portsmouth North	Labour	
Ian McCartney	Makerfield	Labour	
Siobhain McDonagh	Mitcham and Morden	Labour	
John McDonnell	Hayes and Harlington	Labour	
Pat McFadden	Wolverhampton South East	Labour	
Anne McIntosh	Vale of York	Conservative	
Shona McIsaac	Cleethorpes	Labour	
Patrick McLoughlin	West Derbyshire	Conservative	
Tony McNulty	Harrow East	Labour	
Michael Meacher	Oldham West and Royton	Labour	
Alan Meale	Mansfield	Labour	
Patrick Mercer	Newark	Conservative	
Gillian Merron	Lincoln	Labour	
Alan Milburn	Darlington	Labour	
David Miliband	South Shields	Labour	
Ed Miliband	Doncaster North	Labour	
Andrew Miller	Ellesmere Port and Neston	Labour	
Maria Miller	Basingstoke	Conservative	
Anne Milton	Guildford	Conservative	
Andrew Mitchell	Sutton Coldfield	Conservative	
Austin Mitchell	Great Grimsby	Labour	
Laura Moffatt	Crawley	Labour	
Chris Mole	Ipswich	Labour	
Margaret Moran	Luton South	Labour	
Elliot Morley	Scunthorpe	Labour	
Malcolm Moss	North East Cambridgeshire	Conservative	
Kali Mountford	Colne Valley	Labour	
George Mudie	Leeds East	Labour	
Greg Mulholland	Leeds North West	Liberal Democrat	
Chris Mullin	Sunderland South	Labour	
Meg Munn	Sheffield Heeley	Labour	
Denis Murphy	Wansbeck	Labour	
Dr Andrew Murrison	Westbury	Conservative	
Douglas Naysmith	Bristol North West	Labour	
Bob Neill	Bromley and Chislehurst	Conservative	Elected in 2006 by-election
Brooks Newmark	Braintree	Conservative	
Dan Norris	Wansdyke	Labour	
Mike O'Brien	North Warwickshire	Labour	
Stephen O'Brien	Eddisbury	Conservative	
Edward O'Hara	Knowsley South	Labour	
Mark Oaten	Winchester	Liberal Democrat	
Bill Olner	Nuneaton	Labour	
George Osborne	Tatton	Conservative	
Richard Ottaway	Croydon South	Conservative	
James Paice	South East Cambridgeshire	Conservative	
Nick Palmer	Broxtowe	Labour	
Owen Paterson	North Shropshire	Conservative	
Ian Pearson	Dudley South	Labour	
Andrew Pelling	Croydon Central	Conservative	
Mike Penning	Hemel Hempstead	Conservative	
John Penrose	Weston-Super-Mare	Conservative	
Eric Pickles	Brentwood and Ongar	Conservative	
James Plaskitt	Warwick and Leamington	Labour	
Greg Pope	Hyndburn	Labour	
Stephen Pound	Ealing North	Labour	
Bridget Prentice	Lewisham East	Labour	
Gordon Prentice	Pendle	Labour	
John Prescott	Kingston upon Hull East	Labour	
Dawn Primarolo	Bristol South	Labour	
Mark Prisk	Hertford and Stortford	Conservative	
Mark Pritchard	Wrekin, The	Conservative	
Gwyn Prosser	Dover	Labour	
Dr John Pugh	Southport	Liberal Democrat	
Ken Purchase	Wolverhampton North East	Labour	
James Purnell	Stalybridge and Hyde	Labour	
Bill Rammell	Harlow	Labour	
John Randall	Uxbridge	Conservative	
Nick Raynsford	Greenwich and Woolwich	Labour	
John Redwood	Wokingham	Conservative	
Andy Reed	Loughborough	Labour	
Jamie Reed	Copeland	Labour	
Malcolm Rifkind	Kensington and Chelsea	Conservative	
Linda Riordan	Halifax	Labour	
Andrew Robathan	Blaby	Conservative	
Hugh Robertson	Faversham and Mid Kent	Conservative	
Laurence Robertson	Tewkesbury	Conservative	
Geoffrey Robinson	Coventry North West	Labour	
Dan Rogerson	North Cornwall	Liberal Democrat	
Terry Rooney	Bradford North	Labour	
Andrew Rosindell	Romford	Conservative	
Paul Rowen	Rochdale	Liberal Democrat	
Joan Ruddock	Lewisham Deptford	Labour	
David Ruffley	Bury St Edmunds	Conservative	
Bob Russell	Colchester	Liberal Democrat	
Christine Russell	Chester, City of	Labour	
Joan Ryan	Enfield North	Labour	
Martin Salter	Reading West	Labour	
Adrian Sanders	Torbay	Liberal Democrat	
Lee Scott	Ilford North	Conservative	
Alison Seabeck	Plymouth Devonport	Labour	
Andrew Selous	South West Bedfordshire	Conservative	
Grant Shapps	Welwyn Hatfield	Conservative	
Jonathan Shaw	Chatham and Aylesford	Labour	
Barry Sheerman	Huddersfield	Labour	
Richard Shepherd	Aldridge-Brownhills	Conservative	
Clare Short	Birmingham, Ladywood	Independent Labour	Elected as Labour
Mark Simmonds	Boston and Skegness	Conservative	
Siôn Simon	Birmingham, Erdington	Labour	
Alan Simpson	Nottingham South	Labour	
Keith Simpson	Mid Norfolk	Conservative	
Marsha Singh	Bradford West	Labour	
Dennis Skinner	Bolsover	Labour	
Andy Slaughter	Ealing, Acton and Shepherd's Bush	Labour	
Andrew Smith	Oxford East	Labour	
Angela Smith	Basildon	Labour	
Angela Smith	Sheffield Hillsborough	Labour	
Geraldine Smith	Morecambe and Lunesdale	Labour	
Iain Duncan Smith	Chingford and Woodford Green	Conservative	
Jacqui Smith	Redditch	Labour	
Anne Snelgrove	Swindon South	Labour	
Nicholas Soames	Mid Sussex	Conservative	
Sir Peter Soulsby	Leicester South	Labour	
Helen Southworth	Warrington South	Labour	
John Spellar	Warley	Labour	
Caroline Spelman	Meriden	Conservative	
Sir Michael Spicer	West Worcestershire	Conservative	
Bob Spink	Castle Point	Conservative	
Richard Spring	West Suffolk	Conservative	
Sir John Stanley	Tonbridge and Malling	Conservative	
Dr Phyllis Starkey	Milton Keynes South West	Labour	
Anthony Steen	Totnes	Conservative	
Ian Stewart	Eccles	Labour	
Howard Stoate	Dartford	Labour	
Jack Straw	Blackburn	Labour	
Gary Streeter	South West Devon	Conservative	
Graham Stringer	Manchester Blackley	Labour	
Gisela Stuart	Birmingham, Edgbaston	Labour	
Graham Stuart	Beverley and Holderness	Conservative	
Andrew Stunell	Hazel Grove	Liberal Democrat	
Gerry Sutcliffe	Bradford South	Labour	
Desmond Swayne	New Forest West	Conservative	
Hugo Swire	East Devon	Conservative	
Robert Syms	Poole	Conservative	
Sir Peter Tapsell	Louth and Horncastle	Conservative	
Dari Taylor	Stockton South	Labour	
David Taylor	North West Leicestershire	Labour	Died 26 December 2009
Ian Taylor	Esher and Walton	Conservative	
Matthew Taylor	Truro and St Austell	Liberal Democrat	
Dr Richard Taylor	Wyre Forest	Health Concern	
Sarah Teather	Brent East	Liberal Democrat	
Gareth Thomas	Harrow West	Labour	
Emily Thornberry	Islington South and Finsbury	Labour	
Stephen Timms	East Ham	Labour	
Paddy Tipping	Sherwood	Labour	
Mark Todd	South Derbyshire	Labour	
David Tredinnick	Bosworth	Conservative	
Jon Trickett	Hemsworth	Labour	
Paul Truswell	Pudsey	Labour	
Andrew Turner	Isle of Wight	Conservative	
Des Turner	Brighton Kemptown	Labour	
Neil Turner	Wigan	Labour	
Derek Twigg	Halton	Labour	
Andrew Tyrie	Chichester	Conservative	
Kitty Ussher	Burnley	Labour	
Ed Vaizey	Wantage	Conservative	
Shailesh Vara	North West Cambridgeshire	Conservative	
Keith Vaz	Leicester East	Labour	
Peter Viggers	Gosport	Conservative	
Theresa Villiers	Chipping Barnet	Conservative	
Dr Rudi Vis	Finchley and Golders Green	Labour	
Charles Walker	Broxbourne	Conservative	
Ben Wallace	Lancaster and Wyre	Conservative	
Joan Walley	Stoke-on-Trent North	Labour	
Robert Walter	North Dorset	Conservative	
Lynda Waltho	Stourbridge	Labour	
Claire Ward	Watford	Labour	
Robert Wareing	Liverpool West Derby	Labour	
Nigel Waterson	Eastbourne	Conservative	
Angela Watkinson	Upminster	Conservative	
Tom Watson	West Bromwich East	Labour	
David Watts	St Helens North	Labour	
Steve Webb	Northavon	Liberal Democrat	
Dr Alan Whitehead	Southampton Test	Labour	
John Whittingdale	Maldon and East Chelmsford	Conservative	
Malcolm Wicks	Croydon North	Labour	
Ann Widdecombe	Maidstone and The Weald	Conservative	
Bill Wiggin	Leominster	Conservative	
David Willetts	Havant	Conservative	
Roger Williams	Brecon and Radnorshire	Liberal Democrat	
Stephen Williams	Bristol West	Liberal Democrat	
Phil Willis	Harrogate and Knaresborough	Liberal Democrat	
Michael Wills	Swindon North	Labour	
David Wilshire	Spelthorne	Conservative	
Rob Wilson	Reading East	Conservative	
David Winnick	Walsall North	Labour	
Ann Winterton	Congleton	Conservative	
Sir Nicholas Winterton	Macclesfield	Conservative	
Rosie Winterton	Doncaster Central	Labour	
Mike Wood	Batley and Spen	Labour	
Shaun Woodward	St Helens South	Labour	
Phil Woolas	Oldham East and Saddleworth	Labour	
Dr Tony Wright	Cannock Chase	Labour	
Tony D Wright	Great Yarmouth	Labour	
David Wright	Telford	Labour	
Iain Wright	Hartlepool	Labour	
Jeremy Wright	Rugby and Kenilworth	Conservative	
Derek Wyatt	Sittingbourne and Sheppey	Labour	
Tim Yeo	South Suffolk	Conservative	
Sir George Young	North West Hampshire	Conservative	
Richard Younger-Ross	Teignbridge	Liberal Democrat	

== By-elections ==
By-election	Date	Incumbent	Party	Winner	Party	Cause
Bromley and Chislehurst	29 June 2006	Eric Forth	Conservative	Bob Neill	Conservative	Death (cancer)
Cheadle	14 July 2005	Patsy Calton	Liberal Democrats	Mark Hunter	Liberal Democrats	Death (cancer)

== See also ==
- Results of the 2005 United Kingdom general election
- List of MPs elected in the 2005 United Kingdom general election
- List of MPs for constituencies in Scotland (2005–2010)
- List of MPs for constituencies in Northern Ireland (2005–2010)
- List of MPs for constituencies in Wales (2005–2010)
- List of United Kingdom Labour MPs (2005–2010)
- List of United Kingdom Labour and Labour Co-operative MPs (2005–2010)
- List of United Kingdom Labour Co-operative MPs (2005–2010)
- List of United Kingdom Conservative MPs (2005–2010)
- List of United Kingdom Liberal Democrat MPs (2005–2010)
- Category:UK MPs 2005-2010
