= 1995 Stockport Metropolitan Borough Council election =

Local election in Stockport

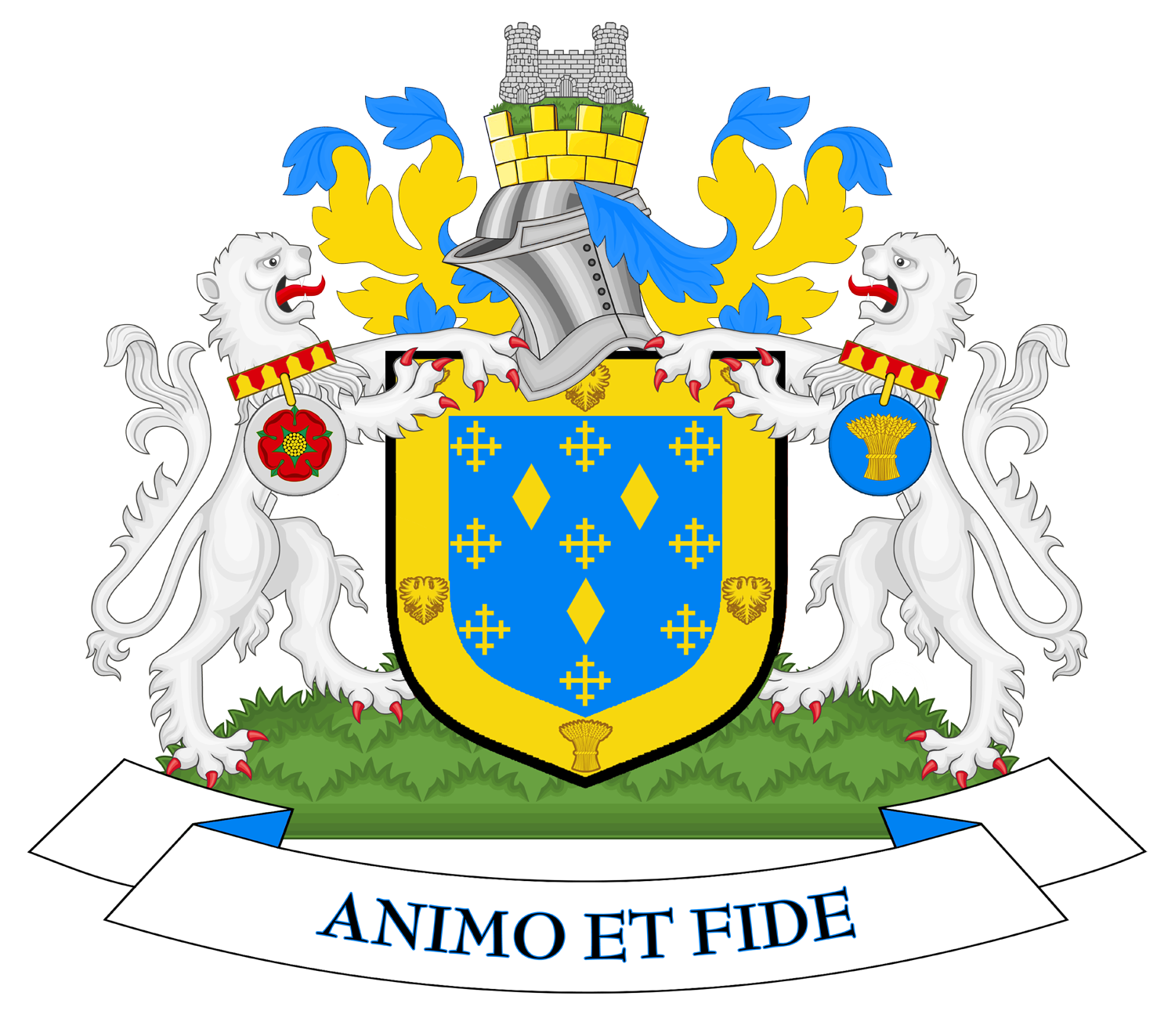
← 1994	4 May 1995	1996 →

21 of 63 seats to Stockport Metropolitan Borough Council 32 seats needed for a majority
	First party	Second party	Third party
Leader	Fred Ridley	Colin MacAlister	Ian Roberts
Party	Liberal Democrats	Labour	Conservative
Leader's seat	Cheadle Hulme South	Brinnington	Cheadle
Last election	12 seats, 43.9%	9 seats, 28.9%	0 seats, 23.3%
Seats before	29	18	13
Seats won	9	9	2
Seats after	27	23	10
Seat change	▼2	▲5	▼3
Popular vote	29,203	34,234	20,192
Percentage	33.7%	39.5%	23.3%
Swing	▼10.2%	▲10.6%	Steady
	Fourth party
Leader	Ron Stenson
Party	Heald Green Ratepayers
Leader's seat	Heald Green
Last election	1 seat, 3.0%
Seats before	3
Seats won	1
Seats after	3
Seat change	Steady
Popular vote	2,193
Percentage	2.5%
Swing	▼0.5%
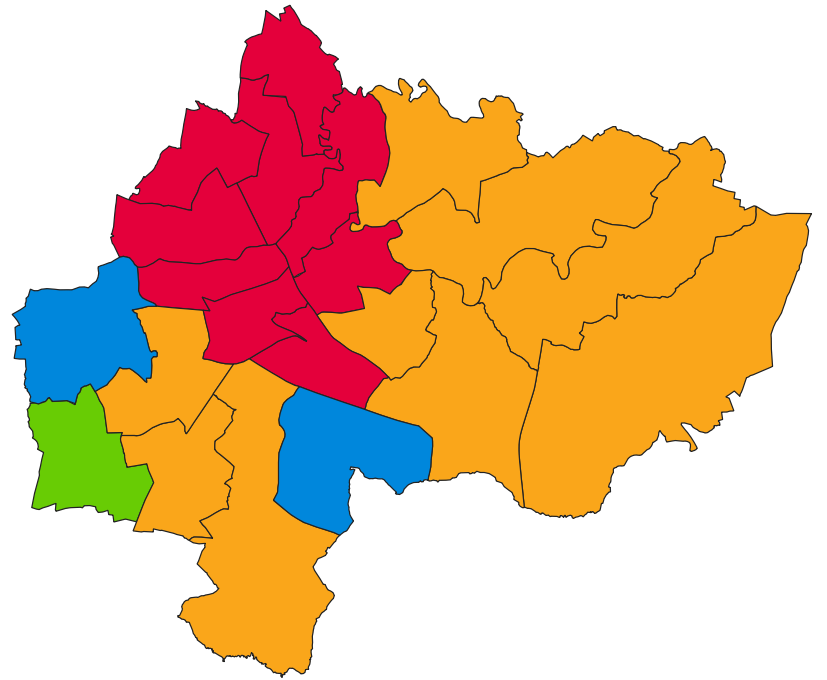
- Map of results of 1995 election
Leader of the Council before election
No leader
No overall control
Leader of the Council after election
No leader
No overall control

Elections to Stockport Council were held on Thursday, 4 May 1995. One third of the council was up for election, expiring in 1999. The council remained under no overall control.

== Election result ==
Party	Votes		Seats			Full Council	
Liberal Democrats	29,203 (33.7%)	▼10.2	9 (42.9%)	9 / 21	▼2	27 (42.9%)	27 / 63
Labour Party	34,234 (39.5%)	▲10.6	9 (42.9%)	9 / 21	▲5	23 (36.5%)	23 / 63
Conservative Party	20,192 (23.3%)	Steady	2 (9.5%)	2 / 21	▼3	10 (15.9%)	10 / 63
Heald Green Ratepayers	2,139 (2.5%)	▼0.5	1 (4.8%)	1 / 21	Steady	3 (4.8%)	3 / 63
Green Party	794 (0.9%)	Steady	0 (0.0%)	0 / 21	Steady	0 (0.0%)	0 / 63

↓
23	27	3	10

== Ward results ==
=== Bredbury ===
Bredbury
Party	Candidate	Votes	%	±%
Liberal Democrats	G. Cooper*	2,284	53.4	−12.7
Labour	S. Humphries	1,355	31.7	+13.0
Conservative	K. Gibbons	635	14.9	−0.4
Majority		929	21.7	−25.7
Turnout		4,274	37.0	−5.5
Liberal Democrats hold		Swing		

=== Brinnington ===
Brinnington
Party	Candidate	Votes	%	±%
Labour	C. MacAlister*	2,184	87.3	+6.9
Liberal Democrats	H. Austin	167	6.7	−6.1
Conservative	P. Gresty	150	6.0	−0.8
Majority		2,017	80.6	+13.0
Turnout		2,501	32.5	−6.1
Labour hold		Swing		

=== Cale Green ===
Cale Green
Party	Candidate	Votes	%	±%
Labour	J. McGuire	2,277	67.8	+12.8
Liberal Democrats	J. Jones	873	26.0	−11.8
Conservative	G. McKelvie	206	6.1	−1.1
Majority		659	41.8	+24.6
Turnout		3,356	37.9	−5.3
Labour gain from Liberal Democrats		Swing		

=== Cheadle ===
Cheadle
Party	Candidate	Votes	%	±%
Conservative	I. Roberts*	1,734	41.7	+2.3
Liberal Democrats	K. Crauford	1,518	36.5	−10.7
Labour	A. Kellett	911	21.9	+8.4
Majority		216	5.2	
Turnout		4,163	37.0	−7.4
Conservative hold		Swing		

=== Cheadle Hulme North ===
Cheadle Hulme North
Party	Candidate	Votes	%	±%
Liberal Democrats	J. Pantall*	1,937	48.7	−10.7
Labour	J. Wallace	1,269	31.9	+14.1
Conservative	A. Johnson	769	19.3	−3.5
Majority		668	16.8	−19.8
Turnout		3,975	34.9	−6.5
Liberal Democrats hold		Swing		

=== Cheadle Hulme South ===
Cheadle Hulme South
Party	Candidate	Votes	%	±%
Liberal Democrats	F. Ridley*	2,322	53.2	−7.0
Conservative	P. Bellis	1,299	29.8	+0.1
Labour	S. Bennett	740	17.0	+6.9
Majority		1,023	23.4	−7.1
Turnout		4,361	39.7	−7.0
Liberal Democrats hold		Swing		

=== Davenport ===
Davenport
Party	Candidate	Votes	%	±%
Labour	M. Jones*	2,298	62.0	+9.2
Conservative	D. Wilson	906	24.4	−3.4
Liberal Democrats	G. Cain	412	11.1	−8.3
Green	J. Clements	92	2.5	N/A
Majority		1,392	37.6	+12.6
Turnout		3,708	40.1	−6.4
Labour hold		Swing		

=== East Bramhall ===
East Bramhall
Party	Candidate	Votes	%	±%
Conservative	K. Holt*	2,460	44.2	+2.8
Liberal Democrats	P. King	2,116	38.0	−5.5
Labour	D. White	820	14.7	+2.7
Green	M. Suter	166	3.0	−0.1
Majority		344	6.2	
Turnout		5,562	43.6	−1.4
Conservative hold		Swing		

=== Edgeley ===
Edgeley
Party	Candidate	Votes	%	±%
Labour	C. Fielder	2,634	69.4	+15.0
Liberal Democrats	R. Inkpen	821	21.6	−9.2
Conservative	H. Brown	281	7.4	+1.2
Green	G. Johnson	60	1.6	0
Majority		1,813	47.8	+37.2
Turnout		3,796	40.5	−8.7
Labour gain from Liberal Democrats		Swing		

=== Great Moor ===
Great Moor
Party	Candidate	Votes	%	±%
Liberal Democrats	T. E. Pyle*	2,025	45.8	−7.7
Labour	B. Holland	1,680	38.0	+7.3
Conservative	E. Howard	721	16.3	+0.5
Majority		345	7.8	−15.0
Turnout		4,426	41.2	−10.3
Liberal Democrats hold		Swing		

=== Hazel Grove ===
Hazel Grove
Party	Candidate	Votes	%	±%
Liberal Democrats	C. Phythian	2,527	48.9	−12.2
Conservative	D. Yates	1,636	31.7	+3.8
Labour	M. McNamee	1,000	19.4	+8.4
Majority		891	17.2	−16.0
Turnout		5,163	42.5	−8.1
Liberal Democrats hold		Swing		

=== Heald Green ===
Heald Green
Party	Candidate	Votes	%	±%
Heald Green Ratepayers	N. Fields*	2,139	62.7	−12.2
Labour	J. Becker	690	20.2	+8.4
Conservative	S. Swinglehurst	304	8.9	+1.5
Liberal Democrats	D. Roberts Jones	280	8.2	+2.4
Majority		1,449	42.5	−20.6
Turnout		3,413	33.5	−9.3
Heald Green Ratepayers hold		Swing		

=== Heaton Mersey ===
Heaton Mersey
Party	Candidate	Votes	%	±%
Labour	P. Lanigan	3,191	60.2	+5.7
Conservative	L. Jones*	1,666	31.4	+3.2
Liberal Democrats	M. Colbridge	332	6.3	−8.6
Green	M. Sullivan	112	2.1	−0.4
Majority		1,525	28.8	+2.5
Turnout		5,301	45.3	−5.6
Labour gain from Conservative		Swing		

=== Heaton Moor ===
Heaton Moor
Party	Candidate	Votes	%	±%
Labour	S. Vegro	2,211	54.1	+11.1
Conservative	W. Crook*	1,384	33.8	0
Liberal Democrats	S. Newton	419	10.2	−10.7
Green	I. Lindsay-Dunn	76	1.9	−0.4
Majority		827	20.3	+11.1
Turnout		4,090	41.8	−5.1
Labour gain from Conservative		Swing		

=== Manor ===
Manor
Party	Candidate	Votes	%	±%
Labour	P. Wharton	2,352	54.6	+9.0
Liberal Democrats	M. Torode	1,625	37.7	−6.5
Conservative	E. Dennis	260	6.0	−1.9
Green	R. Lindsay-Dunn	69	1.6	−0.7
Majority		727	16.9	+15.5
Turnout		4,306	45.4	−3.3
Labour gain from Liberal Democrats		Swing		

=== North Marple ===
North Marple
Party	Candidate	Votes	%	±%
Liberal Democrats	B. Harrison*	2,185	57.7	−6.8
Conservative	P. Smith	878	23.2	−0.8
Labour	S. Townsend	727	19.2	+7.7
Majority		1,307	34.5	+4.0
Turnout		3,790	40.3	−9.0
Liberal Democrats hold		Swing		

=== North Reddish ===
North Reddish
Party	Candidate	Votes	%	±%
Labour	P. Scott*	2,845	82.8	+8.3
Conservative	R. Stevenson	331	9.6	−0.2
Liberal Democrats	A. Thomas	259	7.5	−8.2
Majority		2,514	73.2	+14.4
Turnout		3,435	29.0	−6.2
Labour hold		Swing		

=== Romiley ===
Romiley
Party	Candidate	Votes	%	±%
Liberal Democrats	J. Ingham*	1,916	46.2	−14.5
Labour	D. Brown	1,145	27.6	+11.8
Conservative	W. Law	958	23.1	+2.4
Green	G. Reid	126	3.0	+0.3
Majority		771	18.6	−21.4
Turnout		4,145	37.8	−7.8
Liberal Democrats hold		Swing		

=== South Marple ===
South Marple
Party	Candidate	Votes	%	±%
Liberal Democrats	J. Hart	2,281	55.5	−5.5
Conservative	D. Law	1,176	28.6	−5.9
Labour	H. Abrams	654	15.9	+9.4
Majority		1,105	26.9	+3.3
Turnout		4,111	42.0	−10.7
Liberal Democrats hold		Swing		

=== South Reddish ===
South Reddish
Party	Candidate	Votes	%	±%
Labour	S. Broadhurst*	2,782	74.0	+14.0
Liberal Democrats	I. McLean	599	15.9	−12.7
Conservative	D. Lawson	380	10.1	−1.3
Majority		2,183	58.1	+26.7
Turnout		3,761	35.2	−3.3
Labour hold		Swing		

=== West Bramhall ===
West Bramhall
Party	Candidate	Votes	%	±%
Liberal Democrats	A. Smith	2,305	46.8	−9.9
Conservative	A. Law*	2,058	41.8	+3.5
Labour	P. Dykes	469	9.5	+4.5
Green	P. Carpenter	93	1.9	N/A
Majority		247	5.0	−13.4
Turnout		4,925	42.5	−10.4
Liberal Democrats gain from Conservative		Swing		
