= 2000 Stockport Metropolitan Borough Council election =

Local election in Stockport

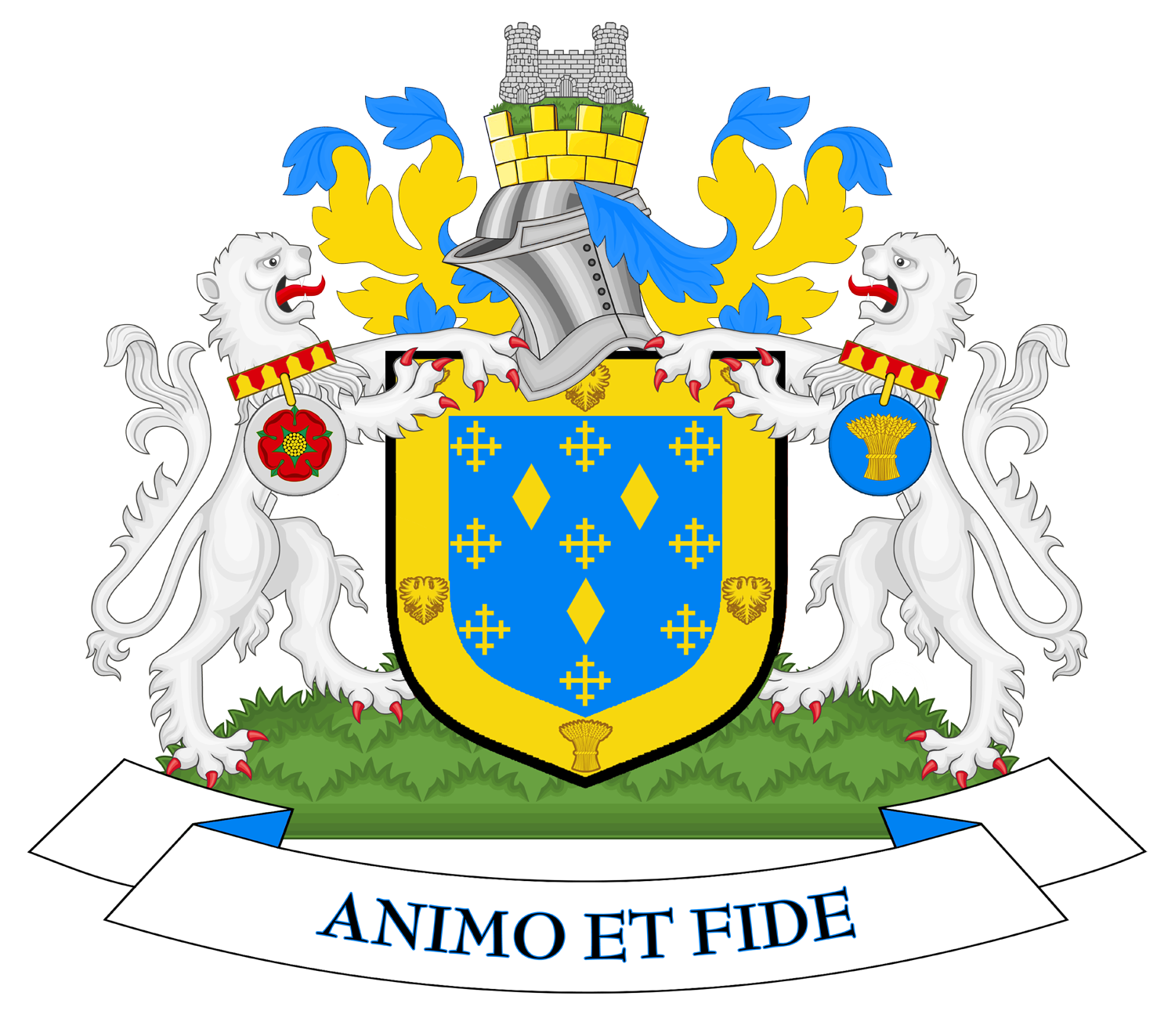
- 4 May 2000

22 of 63 seats to Stockport Metropolitan Borough Council 32 seats needed for a majority
| | First party | Second party | Third party |
|---|---|---|---|
| Leader | Fred Ridley | Tom McGee | Kenneth Holt |
| Party | Liberal Democrats | Labour | Conservative |
| Leader's seat | Cheadle Hulme South | Davenport | East Bramhall |
| Last election | 11 seats, 38.5% | 8 seats, 27.6% | 1 seat, 26.0% |
| Seats before | 32 | 25 | 2 |
| Seats won | 10 | 7 | 4 |
| Seats after | 31 | 22 | 6 |
| Seat change | ▼1 | ▼3 | ▲4 |
| Popular vote | 25,617 | 16,099 | 22,485 |
| Percentage | 37.2% | 23.4% | 32.6% |
| Swing | ▼1.3% | ▼4.2% | ▲5.5% |
| | Fourth party | Fifth party |
| Leader | Ron Stenson | David Goddard |
| Party | Heald Green Ratepayers | Independent |
| Leader's seat | Heald Green | South Reddish |
| Last election | 1 seat, 3.5% | 0 seats, 2.2% |
| Seats before | 3 | 1 |
| Seats won | 1 | 0 |
| Seats after | 3 | 1 |
| Seat change | Steady | Steady |
| Popular vote | 2,483 | 786 |
| Percentage | 3.6% | 1.1% |
| Swing | ▲0.1% | ▼1.1% |
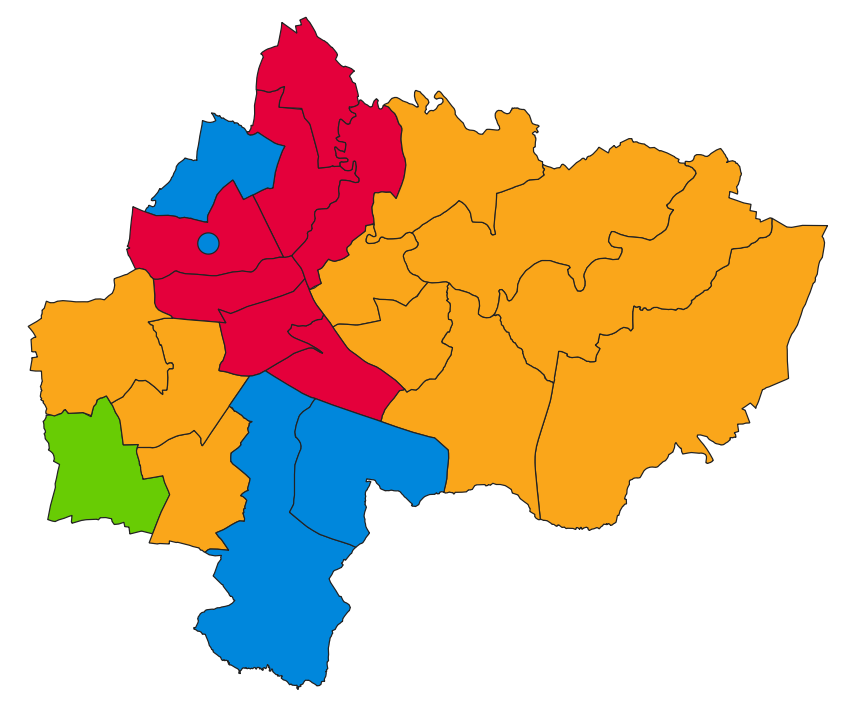
- Map of results of 2000 election
Leader of the Council before election
Fred Ridley
Liberal Democrats
Leader of the Council after election
Fred Ridley
Liberal Democrats

Elections to Stockport Council were held on Thursday, 4 May 2000. One third of the council was up for election, with each successful candidate to serve a four-year term of office, expiring in 2004. The Liberal Democrats lost overall control of the council, to no overall control.

== Election result ==
| Party | Votes | | Seats | | | Full Council | |
| Liberal Democrats | 25,617 (37.2%) | ▼1.3 | 10 (45.5%) | 10 / 22 | ▼1 | 31 (49.2%) | 31 / 63 |
| Labour Party | 16,099 (23.4%) | ▼4.2 | 7 (31.8%) | 7 / 22 | ▼3 | 22 (34.9%) | 22 / 63 |
| Conservative Party | 22,485 (32.6%) | ▲5.5 | 4 (18.2%) | 4 / 22 | ▲4 | 6 (9.5%) | 6 / 63 |
| Heald Green Ratepayers | 2,483 (3.6%) | ▲0.1 | 1 (4.5%) | 1 / 22 | Steady | 3 (4.8%) | 3 / 63 |
| Independent | 786 (1.1%) | ▼1.1 | 0 (0.0%) | 0 / 22 | Steady | 1 (1.6%) | 1 / 63 |
| Green Party | 870 (1.3%) | ▲0.2 | 0 (0.0%) | 0 / 22 | Steady | 0 (0.0%) | 0 / 63 |
| UKIP | 577 (0.8%) | N/A | 0 (0.0%) | 0 / 22 | N/A | 0 (0.0%) | 0 / 63 |

↓
| 22 | 31 | 1 | 3 | 6 |

== Ward results ==
=== Bredbury ===
Bredbury
| Party | Candidate | Votes | % | ±% |
|---|---|---|---|---|
| Liberal Democrats | M. Wilson* | 1,847 | 67.8 | +0.6 |
| Conservative | K. Gibbons | 443 | 16.3 | +3.2 |
| Labour | D. Brown | 433 | 15.9 | −3.8 |
| Majority | | 1,404 | 51.5 | +4.0 |
| Turnout | | 2,723 | 23.2 | −1.6 |
| Liberal Democrats hold | | Swing | | |

=== Brinnington ===
Brinnington
| Party | Candidate | Votes | % | ±% |
|---|---|---|---|---|
| Labour | M. Rowles* | 921 | 75.2 | −6.6 |
| Conservative | R. Davison | 161 | 13.2 | +4.5 |
| Liberal Democrats | M. King | 142 | 11.6 | +2.1 |
| Majority | | 760 | 62.1 | −10.2 |
| Turnout | | 1,224 | 16.7 | −3.9 |
| Labour hold | | Swing | | |

=== Cale Green ===
Cale Green
| Party | Candidate | Votes | % | ±% |
|---|---|---|---|---|
| Labour | D. White* | 943 | 54.2 | −16.2 |
| Liberal Democrats | R. Driver | 564 | 32.4 | +15.0 |
| Conservative | J. Jones | 233 | 13.4 | +1.2 |
| Majority | | 379 | 21.8 | −31.2 |
| Turnout | | 1,740 | 19.1 | −1.9 |
| Labour hold | | Swing | | |

=== Cheadle ===
Cheadle
| Party | Candidate | Votes | % | ±% |
|---|---|---|---|---|
| Liberal Democrats | B. Millard | 1,866 | 51.2 | −4.5 |
| Conservative | I. Roberts | 1,448 | 39.7 | +4.5 |
| Labour | S. Moran | 333 | 9.1 | 0 |
| Majority | | 418 | 11.5 | −9.0 |
| Turnout | | 3,647 | 31.4 | −4.2 |
| Liberal Democrats hold | | Swing | | |

=== Cheadle Hulme North ===
Cheadle Hulme North
| Party | Candidate | Votes | % | ±% |
|---|---|---|---|---|
| Liberal Democrats | P. Porgess* | 1,520 | 53.8 | +2.8 |
| Conservative | S. Dey | 851 | 30.2 | +1.8 |
| Labour | M. Junejo | 303 | 10.7 | −9.9 |
| UKIP | V. Cavanagh | 149 | 5.3 | N/A |
| Majority | | 669 | 23.6 | +1.0 |
| Turnout | | 2,823 | 24.5 | −0.8 |
| Liberal Democrats hold | | Swing | | |

=== Cheadle Hulme South ===
Cheadle Hulme South
| Party | Candidate | Votes | % | ±% |
|---|---|---|---|---|
| Liberal Democrats | K. Fletcher* | 1,905 | 55.4 | −3.5 |
| Conservative | D. Lawson | 1,276 | 37.1 | +6.8 |
| Labour | R. Cooper | 258 | 7.5 | −3.3 |
| Majority | | 629 | 18.3 | −10.3 |
| Turnout | | 3,439 | 30.6 | −1.6 |
| Liberal Democrats hold | | Swing | | |

=== Davenport ===
Davenport
| Party | Candidate | Votes | % | ±% |
|---|---|---|---|---|
| Labour | M. Weldon* | 949 | 42.5 | +0.8 |
| Conservative | M. Kilty | 902 | 40.4 | +17.5 |
| Liberal Democrats | J. Humphreys | 384 | 17.1 | +8.2 |
| Majority | | 47 | 2.1 | −13.1 |
| Turnout | | 2,235 | 24.1 | −3.9 |
| Labour hold | | Swing | | |

=== East Bramhall ===
East Bramhall
| Party | Candidate | Votes | % | ±% |
|---|---|---|---|---|
| Conservative | M. Walsh | 2,427 | 46.1 | −3.9 |
| Liberal Democrats | P. King* | 2,407 | 45.7 | +3.4 |
| Labour | P. Hopkins | 261 | 5.0 | −1.1 |
| UKIP | A. Moore | 90 | 1.7 | N/A |
| Green | M. Suter | 83 | 1.5 | −0.1 |
| Majority | | 20 | 0.4 | −7.4 |
| Turnout | | 5,268 | 41.2 | −3.2 |
| Conservative gain from Liberal Democrats | | Swing | | |

=== Edgeley ===
Edgeley
| Party | Candidate | Votes | % | ±% |
|---|---|---|---|---|
| Labour | J. Siddelley* | 1,159 | 62.7 | −8.2 |
| Liberal Democrats | R. Seymour | 315 | 17.0 | +0.7 |
| Conservative | D. Green | 303 | 16.4 | +6.0 |
| Green | G. Johnson | 72 | 3.9 | +1.5 |
| Majority | | 844 | 45.7 | −8.9 |
| Turnout | | 1.849 | 19.9 | −3.9 |
| Labour hold | | Swing | | |

=== Great Moor ===
Great Moor
| Party | Candidate | Votes | % | ±% |
|---|---|---|---|---|
| Liberal Democrats | P. Beatty | 1,409 | 46.0 | −7.8 |
| Independent | K. Ralphs | 583 | 19.0 | +5.3 |
| Conservative | B. Haley | 568 | 18.6 | +8.4 |
| Labour | J. Humphries | 459 | 15.0 | −5.6 |
| Green | K. Pease | 42 | 1.4 | −0.2 |
| Majority | | 826 | 27.0 | −6.1 |
| Turnout | | 3,061 | 28.6 | −3.8 |
| Liberal Democrats hold | | Swing | | |

=== Hazel Grove ===
Hazel Grove
| Party | Candidate | Votes | % | ±% |
|---|---|---|---|---|
| Liberal Democrats | S. Corris* | 2,011 | 51.0 | −6.1 |
| Conservative | J. Townsend | 1,528 | 38.7 | +6.6 |
| Labour | H. Abrams | 266 | 6.7 | −4.1 |
| UKIP | G. Black | 142 | 3.6 | N/A |
| Majority | | 483 | 12.3 | −12.7 |
| Turnout | | 3,947 | 31.9 | +0.6 |
| Liberal Democrats hold | | Swing | | |

=== Heald Green ===
Heald Green
| Party | Candidate | Votes | % | ±% |
|---|---|---|---|---|
| Heald Green Ratepayers | E. Humphreys | 2,483 | 79.5 | +2.4 |
| Conservative | P. Leck | 292 | 9.4 | +0.8 |
| Labour | K. Price | 192 | 6.1 | −1.8 |
| Liberal Democrats | J. Porgess | 155 | 5.0 | −1.4 |
| Majority | | 2,191 | 70.2 | +1.7 |
| Turnout | | 3,122 | 30.5 | +0.1 |
| Heald Green Ratepayers hold | | Swing | | |

=== Heaton Mersey ===
Heaton Mersey (2 vacancies)
| Party | Candidate | Votes | % | ±% |
|---|---|---|---|---|
| Labour | L. Auger* | 1,791 | 44.7 | −11.4 |
| Conservative | E. Foulkes | 1,431 | 35.7 | +5.8 |
| Labour | P. Diggett | 1,410 | 35.2 | −20.9 |
| Conservative | B. Lees | 1,367 | 34.1 | +4.2 |
| Green | M. Sullivan | 396 | 9.9 | +5.7 |
| Liberal Democrats | H. Thompson | 389 | 9.7 | −0.1 |
| Liberal Democrats | D. Roberts-Jones | 324 | 8.1 | −1.7 |
| Majority | | 21 | 0.5 | −25.6 |
| Turnout | | 4,008 | 33.1 | +1.3 |
| Labour hold | | Swing | | |
| Conservative gain from Labour | | Swing | | |

=== Heaton Moor ===
Heaton Moor
| Party | Candidate | Votes | % | ±% |
|---|---|---|---|---|
| Conservative | L. Jones | 1,901 | 49.1 | +4.2 |
| Labour | R. Chapman | 1,564 | 40.4 | −4.6 |
| Liberal Democrats | R. Axtell | 298 | 7.7 | +0.3 |
| Green | J. Cuff | 108 | 2.8 | +0.1 |
| Majority | | 337 | 8.7 | |
| Turnout | | 3,871 | 38.5 | +1.6 |
| Conservative gain from Labour | | Swing | | |

=== Manor ===
Manor
| Party | Candidate | Votes | % | ±% |
|---|---|---|---|---|
| Liberal Democrats | N. Derbyshire | 1,422 | 46.2 | −2.6 |
| Labour | I. Jackson* | 1,324 | 43.0 | −2.0 |
| Conservative | B. Charlesworth | 253 | 8.2 | +3.5 |
| Green | R. Lindsay-Dunn | 79 | 2.6 | +1.1 |
| Majority | | 98 | 3.2 | −0.6 |
| Turnout | | 3,078 | 32.7 | −4.0 |
| Liberal Democrats gain from Labour | | Swing | | |

=== North Marple ===
North Marple
| Party | Candidate | Votes | % | ±% |
|---|---|---|---|---|
| Liberal Democrats | M. Hunter* | 1,853 | 60.0 | −2.5 |
| Conservative | J. Leck | 929 | 30.1 | +8.8 |
| Labour | S. Townsend | 308 | 9.9 | −1.4 |
| Majority | | 924 | 29.9 | −11.3 |
| Turnout | | 3,090 | 32.6 | +0.2 |
| Liberal Democrats hold | | Swing | | |

=== North Reddish ===
North Reddish
| Party | Candidate | Votes | % | ±% |
|---|---|---|---|---|
| Labour | D. Owen | 1,282 | 64.8 | −8.2 |
| Conservative | C. Wilson | 465 | 23.5 | +8.7 |
| Liberal Democrats | D. Matthews | 232 | 11.7 | −0.5 |
| Majority | | 817 | 41.3 | −16.9 |
| Turnout | | 1,979 | 16.8 | −2.0 |
| Labour hold | | Swing | | |

=== Romiley ===
Romiley
| Party | Candidate | Votes | % | ±% |
|---|---|---|---|---|
| Liberal Democrats | H. Lees* | 1,689 | 56.7 | +2.7 |
| Conservative | G. Jones | 903 | 30.3 | +2.6 |
| Labour | B. Lechner | 296 | 9.9 | −5.3 |
| Green | G. Reid | 90 | 3.1 | 0 |
| Majority | | 786 | 26.4 | +0.1 |
| Turnout | | 2,978 | 27.0 | −1.3 |
| Liberal Democrats hold | | Swing | | |

=== South Marple ===
South Marple
| Party | Candidate | Votes | % | ±% |
|---|---|---|---|---|
| Liberal Democrats | M. Elwood | 2,153 | 50.6 | −0.8 |
| Conservative | B. Morley-Scott | 1,806 | 42.4 | +2.6 |
| Labour | M. Duerdoth | 161 | 3.8 | −1.5 |
| UKIP | W. Leigh | 136 | 3.2 | N/A |
| Majority | | 347 | 8.2 | −3.4 |
| Turnout | | 4,256 | 43.6 | +5.9 |
| Liberal Democrats hold | | Swing | | |

=== South Reddish ===
South Reddish
| Party | Candidate | Votes | % | ±% |
|---|---|---|---|---|
| Labour | T. Grundy* | 1,274 | 61.4 | −6.6 |
| Conservative | S. Burt | 381 | 18.4 | +6.2 |
| Liberal Democrats | P. Buttle | 217 | 10.4 | −2.2 |
| Independent | G. Price | 203 | 9.8 | +2.6 |
| Majority | | 893 | 43.0 | −12.4 |
| Turnout | | 2,075 | 19.2 | −3.4 |
| Labour hold | | Swing | | |

=== West Bramhall ===
West Bramhall
| Party | Candidate | Votes | % | ±% |
|---|---|---|---|---|
| Conservative | P. Bellis | 2,617 | 48.4 | +1.4 |
| Liberal Democrats | S. Wyatt* | 2,515 | 46.6 | −0.7 |
| Labour | G. Smith | 212 | 3.9 | −1.8 |
| UKIP | D. Perry | 60 | 1.1 | N/A |
| Majority | | 102 | 1.8 | |
| Turnout | | 5,404 | 46.4 | 0 |
| Conservative gain from Liberal Democrats | | Swing | | |
