= 1996 Stockport Metropolitan Borough Council election =

Local election in Stockport

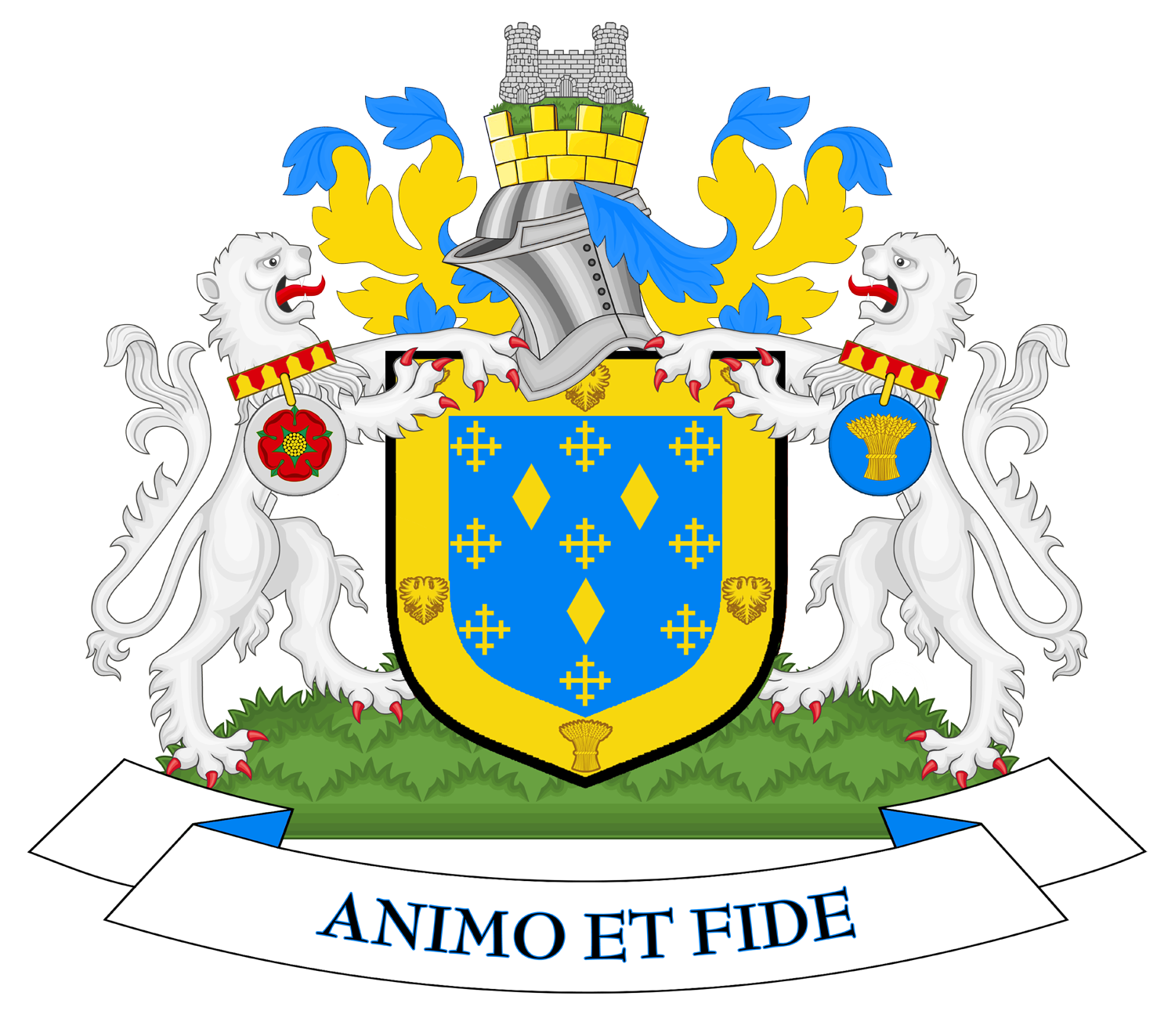
← 1995	2 May 1996	1998 →

21 of 63 seats to Stockport Metropolitan Borough Council 32 seats needed for a majority
	First party	Second party	Third party
Leader	Fred Ridley	Colin MacAlister	Ron Stenson
Party	Liberal Democrats	Labour	Heald Green Ratepayers
Leader's seat	Cheadle Hulme South	Brinnington	Heald Green
Last election	9 seats, 33.7%	9 seats, 39.5%	1 seat, 2.5%
Seats before	27	23	3
Seats won	11	9	1
Seats after	31	27	3
Seat change	▲4	▲4	Steady
Popular vote	31,865	28,484	2,437
Percentage	38.6%	34.5%	3.0%
Swing	▲4.9%	▼5.0%	▲0.5%
	Fourth party
Leader	Ian Roberts
Party	Conservative
Leader's seat	Cheadle
Last election	2 seats, 23.3%
Seats before	10
Seats won	0
Seats after	2
Seat change	▼8
Popular vote	18,680
Percentage	22.6%
Swing	▼0.7%
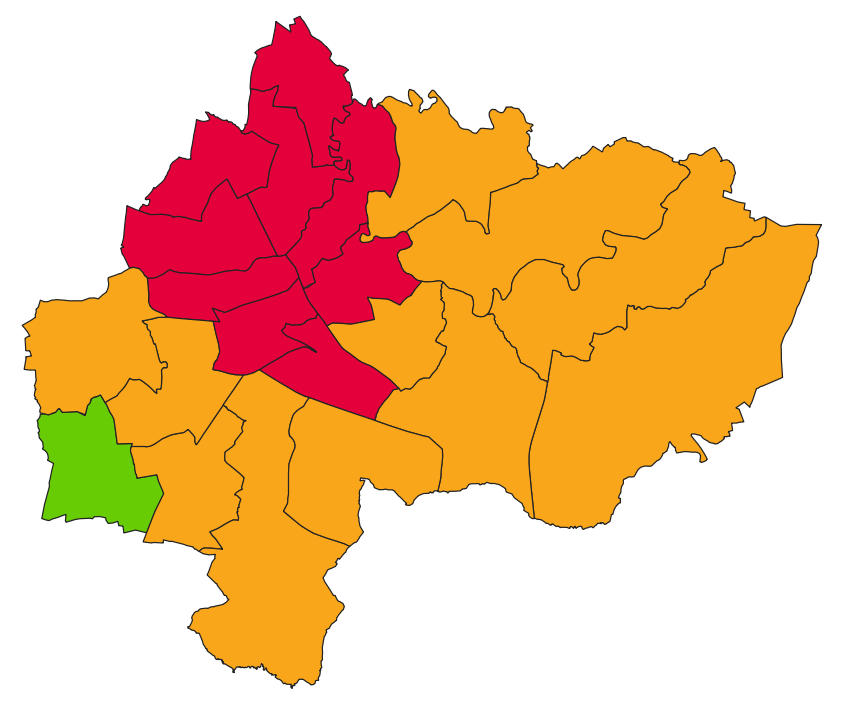
- Map of results of 1996 election
Leader of the Council before election
No leader
No overall control
Leader of the Council after election
Fred Ridley
Liberal Democrats

Elections to Stockport Council were held on Thursday, 2 May 1996. One third of the council was up for election, with each successful candidate to serve a four-year term of office, expiring in 2000. The council remained under no overall control.

== Election result ==
Party	Votes		Seats			Full Council	
Liberal Democrats	31,865 (38.6%)	▲4.9	11 (52.4%)	11 / 21	▲4	31 (49.2%)	31 / 63
Labour Party	28,484 (34.5%)	▼5.0	9 (42.9%)	9 / 21	▲4	27 (42.9%)	27 / 63
Heald Green Ratepayers	2,437 (3.0%)	▲0.5	1 (4.8%)	1 / 21	Steady	3 (4.8%)	3 / 63
Conservative Party	18,680 (22.6%)	▼0.7	0 (0.0%)	0 / 21	▼8	2 (3.2%)	2 / 63
Green Party	830 (1.0%)	▲0.1	0 (0.0%)	0 / 21	Steady	0 (0.0%)	0 / 63
Independent	227 (0.3%)	N/A	0 (0.0%)	0 / 21	N/A	0 (0.0%)	0 / 63

↓
27	31	3	2

== Ward results ==
=== Bredbury ===
Bredbury
Party	Candidate	Votes	%	±%
Liberal Democrats	M. Wilson*	2,149	54.3	+0.9
Labour	D. Brown	1,175	29.7	−2.0
Conservative	K. Gibbons	635	16.0	+1.1
Majority		974	24.6	+2.9
Turnout		3,959	33.2	−3.8
Liberal Democrats hold		Swing		

=== Brinnington ===
Brinnington
Party	Candidate	Votes	%	±%
Labour	M. Rowles*	1,958	87.7	+0.4
Liberal Democrats	K. Crauford	275	12.3	+5.6
Majority		1,683	75.4	−5.2
Turnout		2,233	29.6	−2.9
Labour hold		Swing		

=== Cale Green ===
Cale Green
Party	Candidate	Votes	%	±%
Labour	D. White	2,110	73.2	+5.4
Liberal Democrats	M. Cliffe*	771	26.8	+0.8
Majority		1,339	46.4	+4.6
Turnout		2,881	32.7	−5.2
Labour gain from Liberal Democrats		Swing		

=== Cheadle ===
Cheadle
Party	Candidate	Votes	%	±%
Liberal Democrats	J. Rule	1,970	46.2	+9.7
Conservative	E. Livesley*	1,652	38.7	−3.0
Labour	J. Wallace	643	15.1	−6.8
Majority		318	7.5	
Turnout		4,265	37.7	+0.7
Liberal Democrats gain from Conservative		Swing		

=== Cheadle Hulme North ===
Cheadle Hulme North
Party	Candidate	Votes	%	±%
Liberal Democrats	P. Porgess*	2,188	50.5	+1.8
Labour	P. Diggett	1,326	30.6	−1.3
Conservative	R. Stevenson	819	18.9	−0.4
Majority		862	19.9	+3.1
Turnout		4,333	38.0	+3.1
Liberal Democrats hold		Swing		

=== Cheadle Hulme South ===
Cheadle Hulme South
Party	Candidate	Votes	%	±%
Liberal Democrats	M. Lowe*	2,474	58.3	+5.1
Conservative	P. Bellis	1,267	29.9	+0.1
Labour	P. Wallace	502	11.8	−5.2
Majority		1,207	28.4	+5.0
Turnout		4,243	38.4	−1.3
Liberal Democrats hold		Swing		

=== Davenport ===
Davenport
Party	Candidate	Votes	%	±%
Labour	M. Weldon	1,857	55.0	−7.0
Conservative	I. Barrett	909	26.9	+2.5
Liberal Democrats	J. Jones	513	15.2	+4.1
Green	K. Pease	95	2.8	+0.3
Majority		948	28.1	−9.5
Turnout		3,374	36.5	−3.6
Labour gain from Conservative		Swing		

=== East Bramhall ===
East Bramhall
Party	Candidate	Votes	%	±%
Liberal Democrats	P. King	2,450	43.5	+5.5
Conservative	A. Johnson	2,427	43.1	−1.1
Labour	S. Bennett	638	11.3	−3.4
Green	M. Suter	122	2.2	−0.8
Majority		23	0.4	
Turnout		5,637	44.0	+0.4
Liberal Democrats gain from Conservative		Swing		

=== Edgeley ===
Edgeley
Party	Candidate	Votes	%	±%
Labour	D. McMillan*	2,530	74.1	+4.7
Liberal Democrats	M. Cross	771	22.6	+1.0
Green	G. Johnson	115	3.4	+1.8
Majority		1,759	51.5	+3.7
Turnout		3,416	46.8	−3.7
Labour hold		Swing		

=== Great Moor ===
Great Moor
Party	Candidate	Votes	%	±%
Liberal Democrats	A. Walker*	2,171	51.6	+5.8
Labour	D. Cohen	1,347	32.0	−6.0
Conservative	P. Orton	688	16.4	+0.1
Majority		824	19.6	+11.8
Turnout		4,206	39.5	−1.7
Liberal Democrats hold		Swing		

=== Hazel Grove ===
Hazel Grove
Party	Candidate	Votes	%	±%
Liberal Democrats	S. Corris	2,717	52.5	+3.6
Conservative	T. Dunstan*	1,861	36.0	+4.3
Labour	H. Abrams	597	11.5	−7.9
Majority		856	16.5	−0.7
Turnout		5,175	42.4	−0.1
Liberal Democrats gain from Conservative		Swing		

=== Heald Green ===
Heald Green
Party	Candidate	Votes	%	±%
Heald Green Ratepayers	R. Stenson*	2,437	70.1	+7.4
Labour	J. Becker	488	14.0	−6.2
Conservative	S. Swinglehurst	290	8.3	−0.6
Liberal Democrats	D. Roberts Jones	259	7.5	−0.7
Majority		1,949	56.1	+13.6
Turnout		3,474	33.8	+0.3
Heald Green Ratepayers hold		Swing		

=== Heaton Mersey ===
Heaton Mersey
Party	Candidate	Votes	%	±%
Labour	L. Auger	2,797	58.1	−4.1
Conservative	E. Foulkes*	1,536	31.9	+0.5
Liberal Democrats	S. Newton	355	7.4	+1.1
Green	M. Sullivan	125	2.6	+0.5
Majority		1,261	26.2	−2.6
Turnout		4,813	41.1	−4.2
Labour gain from Conservative		Swing		

=== Heaton Moor ===
Heaton Moor
Party	Candidate	Votes	%	±%
Labour	J. Lewis	1,843	46.0	−8.1
Conservative	L. Jones	1,450	36.2	+2.4
Liberal Democrats	N. Reynolds	591	14.8	+4.6
Green	J. Cuff	122	3.0	+1.1
Majority		393	9.8	−10.5
Turnout		4,006	40.9	−0.9
Labour gain from Conservative		Swing		

=== Manor ===
Manor
Party	Candidate	Votes	%	±%
Labour	I. Jackson*	1,903	52.2	−2.4
Liberal Democrats	M. Torode	1,457	40.0	+2.3
Conservative	E. Dennis	229	6.3	+0.3
Green	R. Lindsay-Dunn	56	1.5	−0.1
Majority		446	12.2	−4.7
Turnout		3,645	38.4	−7.0
Labour hold		Swing		

=== North Marple ===
North Marple
Party	Candidate	Votes	%	±%
Liberal Democrats	M. Hunter	2,270	60.7	+3.0
Conservative	C. Mulliner	709	18.9	−4.3
Labour	S. Townsend	536	14.3	−4.9
Independent	J. Tyers	227	6.1	N/A
Majority		1,561	41.8	+7.3
Turnout		3,742	39.8	−0.5
Liberal Democrats hold		Swing		

=== North Reddish ===
North Reddish
Party	Candidate	Votes	%	±%
Labour	R. Smith*	2,264	80.6	−2.2
Liberal Democrats	P. Larkin	544	19.4	+11.9
Majority		1,720	61.3	−11.9
Turnout		2,808	23.7	−5.3
Labour hold		Swing		

=== Romiley ===
Romiley
Party	Candidate	Votes	%	±%
Liberal Democrats	H. Lees	2,240	51.9	+5.7
Conservative	H. Whitehead*	1,256	29.1	+6.0
Labour	S. Humphries	734	17.0	−10.6
Green	G. Reid	89	2.1	−0.9
Majority		984	22.8	+4.2
Turnout		4,319	39.4	+1.6
Liberal Democrats gain from Conservative		Swing		

=== South Marple ===
South Marple
Party	Candidate	Votes	%	±%
Liberal Democrats	A. Taylor	2,359	59.9	+4.4
Conservative	D. Law	1,105	28.1	−0.5
Labour	W. Sewell	369	9.4	−6.5
Green	A. Riddell	106	2.7	N/A
Majority		1,254	31.8	+4.9
Turnout		3,939	40.3	−1.7
Liberal Democrats hold		Swing		

=== South Reddish ===
South Reddish
Party	Candidate	Votes	%	±%
Labour	T. Grundy*	2,445	78.2	+4.2
Liberal Democrats	I. McLean	682	21.8	+5.9
Majority		1,763	56.4	−1.7
Turnout		3,127	29.2	−6.0
Labour hold		Swing		

=== West Bramhall ===
West Bramhall
Party	Candidate	Votes	%	±%
Liberal Democrats	S. Wyatt	2,659	54.0	+7.2
Conservative	S. Taylor*	1,847	37.5	−4.3
Labour	G. Smith	422	8.6	−0.9
Majority		812	16.5	+11.5
Turnout		4,928	42.5	0
Liberal Democrats gain from Conservative		Swing		
