= European Statutory Instruments Committee =

Select committee in the UK Parliament

The European Statutory Instruments Committee is a select committee of the House of Commons in the Parliament of the United Kingdom. It has a remit to consider proposed instruments relating to the European Union.

== Membership ==
As of 15 March 2020, the members of the committee are as follows:

Member	Party	Constituency
Andrew Jones MP	Conservative	Harrogate & Knaresborough
Kirsty Blackman MP	SNP	Aberdeen North
Geraint Davies MP	Labour	Swansea West
Rt. Hon Philip Dunne PC MP	Conservative	Ludlow
Stephen Kinnock MP	Labour	Aberavon
Rt. Hon. Sir David Evennett PC MP	Conservative	Bexleyheath and Crayford
Vicky Ford MP	Conservative	Chelmsford
Owen Thompson MP	SNP	Midlothian
Flick Drummond MP	Conservative	Meon Valley
Mark Garnier MP	Conservative	Wyre Forest
Charlotte Nichols MP	Labour	Warrington North
Richard Holden MP	Conservative	North West Durham
Mary Robinson MP	Conservative	Cheadle
Craig Williams MP	Conservative	Montgomeryshire
Jo Stevens MP	Labour	Cardiff Central
Liz Twist MP	Labour	Blaydon

== See also ==
- Parliamentary committees of the United Kingdom
