= Mary Robinson (British politician) =

British politician (born 1955)

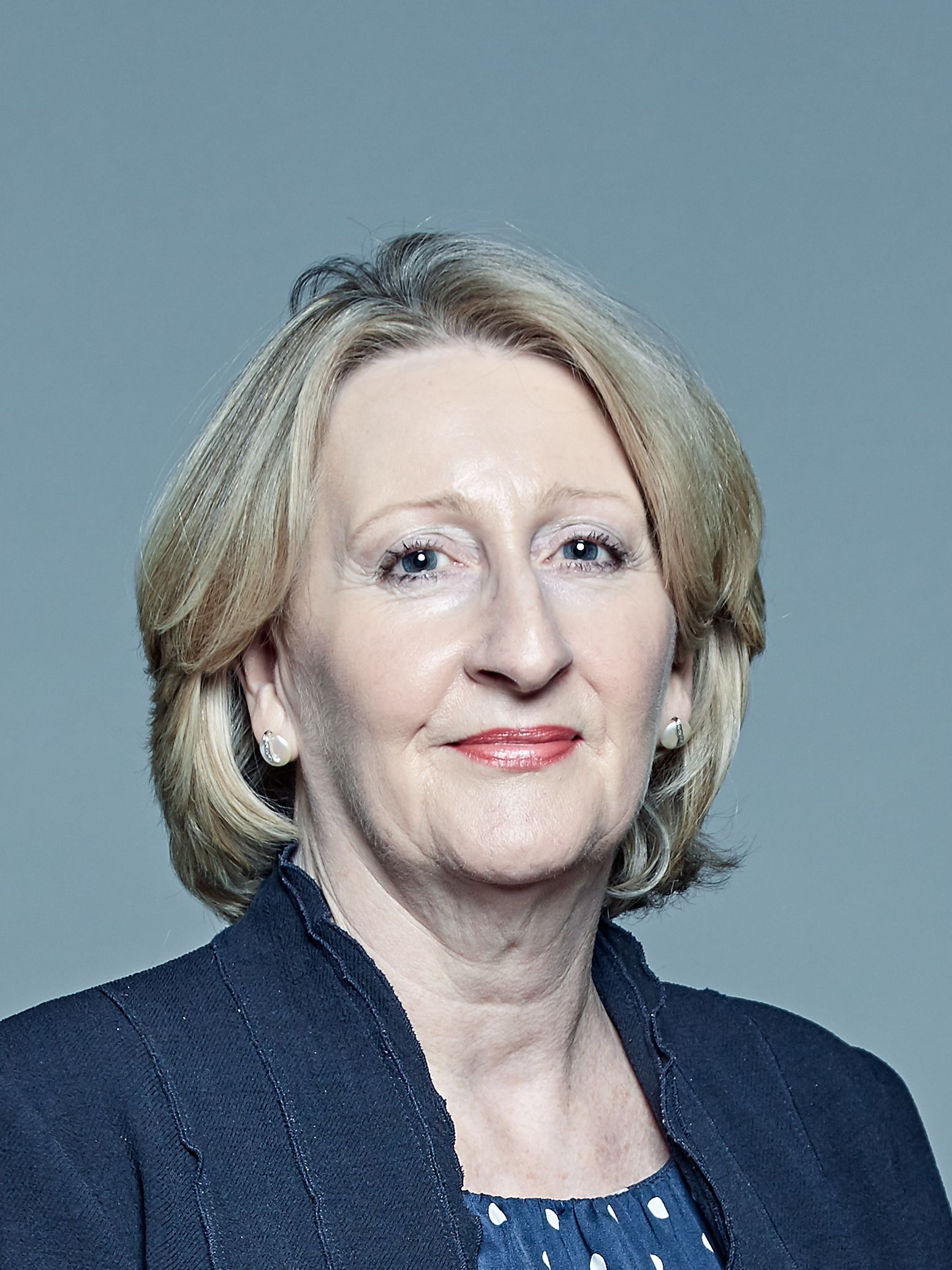
- Official portrait, 2018

Member of Parliament for Cheadle
- In office 7 May 2015 – 30 May 2024
- Preceded by: Mark Hunter
- Succeeded by: Tom Morrison

Personal details
- Born: 23 August 1955 (age 70)
- Party: Conservative
- Website: Official website

Mary Josephine Robinson (born 23 August 1955) is a British Conservative politician. She was elected as the Member of Parliament (MP) for Cheadle at the 2015 general election. At the 2024 general election, Robinson lost her seat to Tom Morrison of the Liberal Democrats.

== Early life ==
Robinson was born on 23 August 1955. She studied law and worked as a chartered accountant. She ran an accountancy practice in Preston called Robinson Rose Ltd with her husband, Stephen, but this went into administration and was acquired by the Champion Group in 2008. In 2012, she founded a fashion design business, Mary Felicity Design Ltd, with her daughter Felicity.

She unsuccessfully stood as the Conservative candidate in the Howick & Priory ward of South Ribble Borough Council in Preston in 2003, but was subsequently elected in the same ward in 2007, when her husband Stephen was also elected as a councillor on the same Council.

== Parliamentary career ==
Robinson was selected as the Conservative candidate for Cheadle in 2013 and stood down as a councillor on South Ribble Borough Council. Her husband also stood down as a councillor and, in the local election that followed, the Liberal Democrats won one of the vacant seats left by the couple. She was elected as the Member of Parliament (MP) for Cheadle at the 2015 general election, achieving a swing of 12.2% against the incumbent Liberal Democrat MP Mark Hunter.

In 2016, Robinson was one of a number of Conservative MPs investigated by police, for allegedly spending more than the legal limit on constituency election campaign expenses; the police passed her file to the Crown Prosecution Service (CPS), who decided that no criminal charges would be brought.

She was opposed to Brexit before the 2016 referendum.

Robinson held her seat at the 2017 general election and 2019 election with a slightly reduced majority.

In Parliament, Robinson served on the European Statutory Instruments Committee and Levelling Up, Housing and Communities Committee. She previously served on the Administration Committee in 2017.

In 2020, Robinson became Chair and Registered Contact for the All Party Parliamentary Group on Whistleblowing. The group has been working to promote an Office of the Whistleblower which was introduced in a private members bill from her APPG colleague, Baroness Kramer.

At the 2024 general election, Tom Morrison defeated Mary Robinson with a majority of 12,235, in the first election using the constituency's new boundaries.

== Personal life ==
She is married to Stephen Robinson and they have four grown up children. In 2016, her husband Stephen stood as the Conservative candidate for the Cheadle Hulme South ward on Stockport Metropolitan Borough Council, but lost to Mark Hunter, the former local MP whom Mary Robinson had defeated in 2015.

Parliament of the United Kingdom
Preceded by Mark Hunter	Member of Parliament for Cheadle; 2015–2024	Succeeded by Tom Morrison
