= Michael Winstanley, Baron Winstanley =

British politician (1918–1993)

The Right Honorable The Lord Winstanley

Member of Parliament for Cheadle
- In office 31 March 1966 – 29 May 1970
- Preceded by: William Shepherd
- Succeeded by: Tom Normanton

Member of Parliament for Hazel Grove
- In office 28 February 1974 – 20 September 1974
- Preceded by: constituency created
- Succeeded by: Tom Arnold

Personal details
- Born: 27 August 1918
- Died: 18 July 1993 (aged 74)
- Party: Liberal
- Education: University of Manchester
- Occupation: General practitioner; TV Presenter; Politician

Michael Platt Winstanley, Baron Winstanley (27 August 1918 – 18 July 1993) was the Liberal member of parliament (MP) for Cheadle from 1966 to 1970 and, after boundary changes, for Hazel Grove, a newly created seat comprising half his former seat, from February to October 1974.

== Early life ==
Winstanley was born in Nantwich, Cheshire, to Sydney Adams Winstanley (1878–1953), GP. He was educated at Manchester Grammar School and the University of Manchester where he was President of the University Union and captain of cricket. He graduated in medicine and served in the RAMC before becoming a general practitioner in Urmston.

== Television career ==
Winstanley became a media personality as a television and radio doctor in the 1960s. Between 1972 and 1986, he presented Granada Television's This Is Your Right, an early-evening, five-minute consumer advice and legal rights bulletin which ultimately credited him as Lord Michael Winstanley.

== Politics ==
Following his return to the House of Commons in 1974, Winstanley discovered that he held a post which would disqualify him from being a member of the House of Commons, medical officer at a Royal Ordnance Factory that amounted to employment in the Civil Service of the Crown. On 3 April 1974, the Commons passed a motion under section 6 of the House of Commons Disqualification Act 1957 to override the disqualification and allow Winstanley to sit.

== Honours ==
Winstanley was created a life peer on 23 January 1976 with the title Baron Winstanley, of Urmston in Greater Manchester. He was chairman of the Countryside Commission from 1978 to 1980.

== Personal life ==
Winstanley's daughter, Diana, became a highly respected academic and teacher at Kingston University, where bursaries are offered in her memory. His niece is journalist and newsreader Anna Ford.

Parliament of the United Kingdom
Preceded by William Shepherd	Member of Parliament for Cheadle; 1966—1970	Succeeded by Tom Normanton
New constituency	Member of Parliament for Hazel Grove; Feb 1974 – Oct 1974	Succeeded by Tom Arnold
