= Stephen Day (British politician) =

British politician

Member of Parliament for Cheadle
- In office 11 June 1987 – 14 May 2001
- Preceded by: Tom Normanton
- Succeeded by: Patsy Calton

Leeds City Councillor for Otley Ward
- In office 1975–1980
- Preceded by: D. Whitley
- Succeeded by: Ward abolished

Personal details
- Born: 30 October 1948 (age 77)
- Party: Conservative

Stephen Richard Day (born 30 October 1948) is a Conservative Party politician in the United Kingdom, and a former member of parliament (MP).

He was the Conservative candidate for Bradford West at the 1983 general election, before being elected as MP for Cheadle from 1987 to 2001, when he lost his seat by 33 votes, the smallest margin of any constituency in the country. He stood again in the 2005 general election and lost by over 4,000 votes, but the seat became vacant within a month on the death of MP Patsy Calton. Day was the Conservative candidate in the resulting by-election, but lost to Liberal Democrat candidate, Mark Hunter. As a result, Day announced that he would not be the Conservative candidate at the next general election.

Day is also Secretary of the Association of Conservative Clubs (ACC) and is prominent within the Conservative Clubs movement in the United Kingdom.

Parliament of the United Kingdom
Preceded by Tom Normanton	Member of Parliament for Cheadle; 1987 – 2001	Succeeded by Patsy Calton
