= Tom Morrison (British politician) =

British politician (elected 2024)

Tom Morrison MP
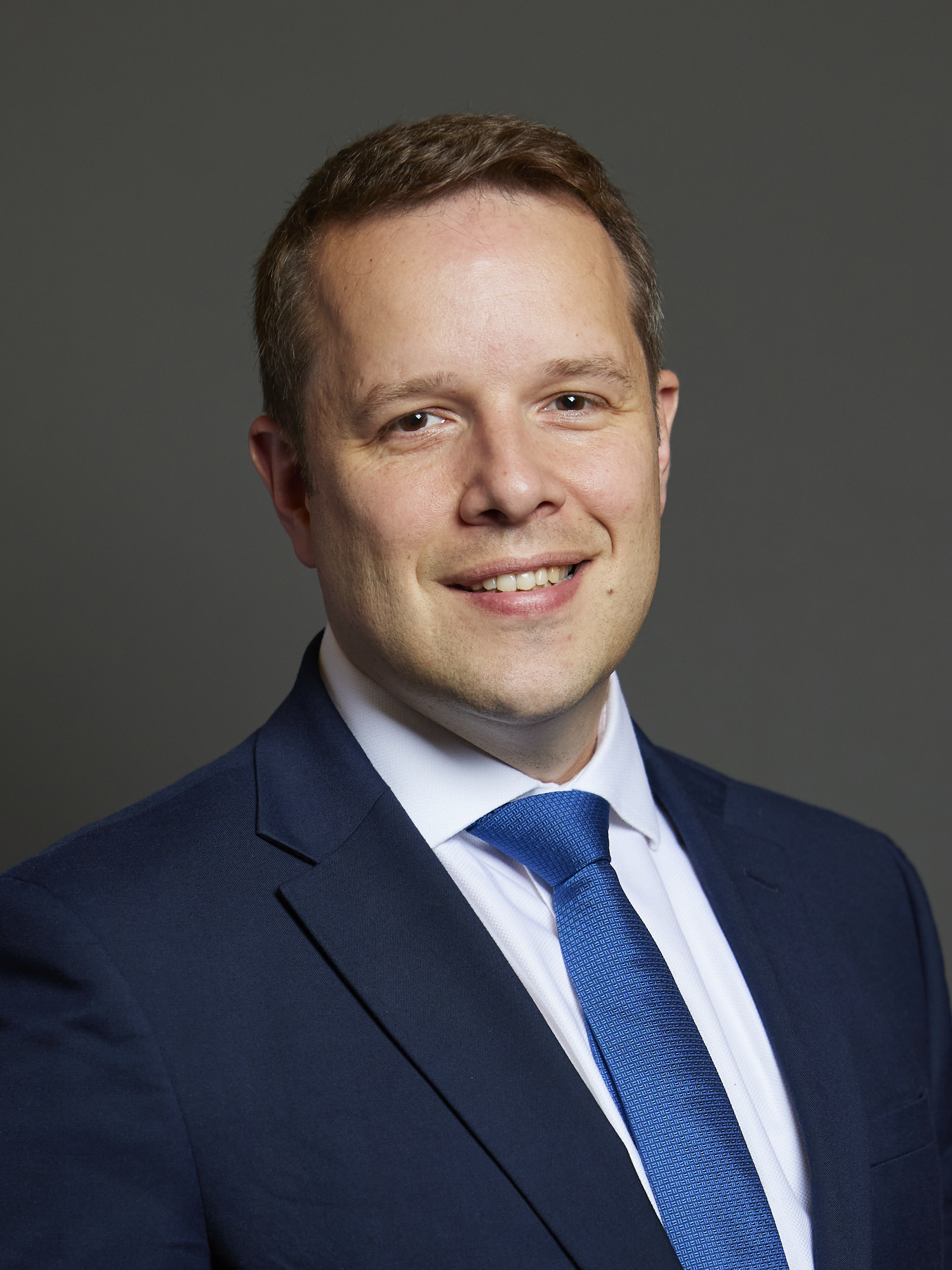
- Official portrait, 2024

Member of Parliament for Cheadle
- Incumbent
- Assumed office 4 July 2024
- Preceded by: Mary Robinson
- Majority: 12,235 (24.1%)

Liberal Democrat portfolios
- 2024–2026: Deputy Chief Whip

Personal details
- Born: Thomas William Morrison; May 1982 (age 44)
- Party: Liberal Democrats
- Website: cheadle-libdems.org.uk

Thomas William Morrison (born May 1982) is a British Liberal Democrat politician who has been Member of Parliament (MP) for Cheadle since 2024.

He was appointed Liberal Democrat Deputy Chief Whip in the House of Commons by leader Ed Davey in September 2024.

Morrison was previously a councillor for Cheadle Hulme North. He sat on Greater Manchester’s Police, Fire and Crime Panel in his capacity as a councillor.

Parliament of the United Kingdom
| Preceded by Mary Robinson | Member of Parliament for Cheadle; 2024–present | Incumbent |
