= Tom Normanton =

British politician

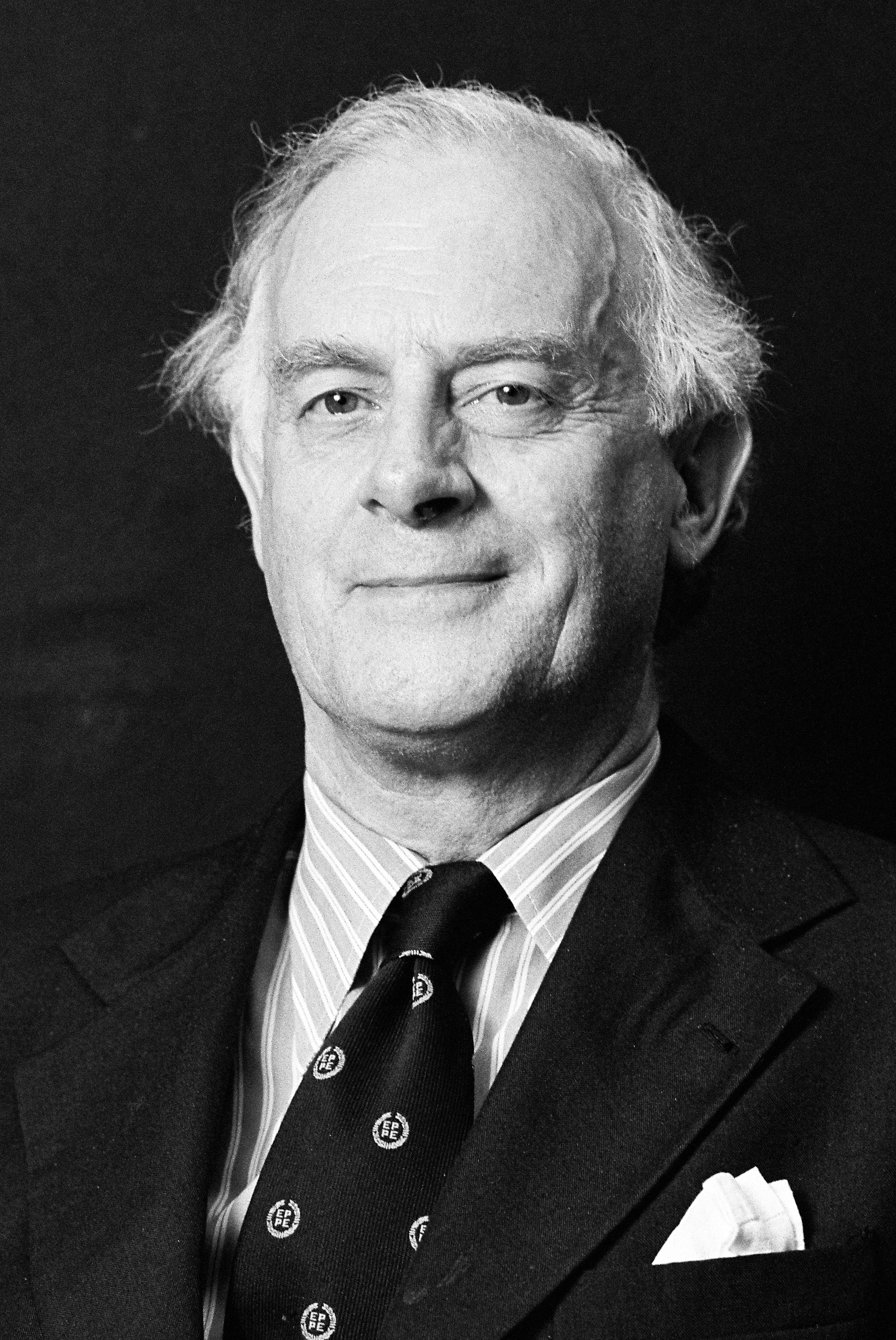
European Parliament portrait

Sir Tom Normanton (12 March 1917 – 6 August 1997) was a Conservative Party politician in the United Kingdom.

== Early life and Summary ==
He was educated at Malsis School in North Yorkshire from 1929 to 1931 and then attended Manchester Grammar School and Manchester University. He joined the family textile business and served in the army in the Second World War, reaching the rank of Major. His obituary stated that he was an improbable combination of the flamboyant, the phlegmatic and the industrious. He was an industrialist of some distinction, above all in the textile industry. He exhibited intense patriotism together with European idealism. He was invited back to Malsis School to present the prizes at Open Day in 1979, but Richard Francis took his place.

== Political career ==
Normanton contested Rochdale in the 1959 United Kingdom general election and 1964 general elections, but came third each time. He was elected at the 1970 general election as member of parliament (MP) for Cheadle, and stood down at the 1987 general election, when he was succeeded by Stephen Day. He was knighted in 1987.

From 1973 to 1979 he was a Member of the European Parliament (MEP), in the period before the European Parliament was directly elected. He was then elected at the 1979 European Parliament election as the MEP for Cheshire East. He was re-elected in 1984, and served as an MEP until his defeat in 1989.

Parliament of the United Kingdom
Preceded by Michael Winstanley	Member of Parliament for Cheadle; 1970–1987	Succeeded by Stephen Day
