= Bucklow (constituency) =

Parliamentary constituency in the United Kingdom, 1945–1950

- Former county constituency for the House of Commons

1945–1950
- Seats: one
- Created from: Altrincham and Knutsford
- Replaced by: Cheadle, Knutsford and Runcorn

Bucklow was, from 1945 to 1950, a county constituency of the House of Commons of the Parliament of the United Kingdom. It elected one Member of Parliament (MP), elected by the first past the post voting system.

== History and boundaries ==
The House of Commons (Redistribution of Seats) Act 1944 set up Boundary Commissions to carry out periodic reviews of the distribution of parliamentary constituencies. It also authorised an initial review to subdivide abnormally large constituencies (those exceeding an electorate of 100,000) in time for the 1945 election. This was implemented by the Redistribution of Seats Order 1945 under which Cheshire was allocated one additional seat, by splitting the constituency of Altrincham into two seats:

- Altrincham and Sale, comprising the two respective municipal boroughs; and
- Bucklow, comprising the bulk of the remainder of the constituency, comprising:

The Urban Districts of Bowdon, Cheadle and Gatley, Hale, and Lymm, part of the Rural District of Bucklow and the parts of the County Borough of Manchester currently in the constituency of Altrincham (the former parishes of Baguley, Northenden and Northen Etchells).

In 1945, the Bucklow area consisted of small towns and countryside surrounding the larger town of Altrincham, near the city of Manchester. It is now a suburban area within the Greater Manchester conurbation.

Under the Representation of the People Act 1948 (which applied from the 1950 general election), Bucklow was abolished and divided between a number of constituencies:

- Cheadle and Gatley became part of the new constituency of Cheadle;
- Bowdon, Hale and the parts of the rural district of Bucklow were transferred to Knutsford;
- Lymm became part of the new Runcorn seat; and
- the parts now in Manchester were combined with Didsbury to form the new constituency of Manchester Wythenshawe.

== Member of Parliament ==
Election	Member	Party
1945	William Shepherd	Conservative
1950	constituency abolished: see Cheadle, Knutsford & Runcorn	

== Election result ==
General election 1945: Bucklow
Party	Candidate	Votes	%	±%
Conservative	William Shepherd	30,165	57.3	
Labour	Alexander Haycock	22,497	42.7	
Majority		7,668	14.6	
Turnout		69,044	76.3	
Conservative win (new seat)				

== See also ==
- List of former United Kingdom Parliament constituencies
- History of parliamentary constituencies and boundaries in Cheshire
