= William Shepherd (British politician) =

William Stanley Shepherd (12 March 1910 – 11 October 2002) was a British Conservative politician.

== Education and career ==
Shepherd was educated at Crewe and worked as a manufacturing chemist and company director and director of the Manchester Chamber of Commerce. He served with the army in France, Belgium and the Netherlands during World War II, reaching the rank of Lieutenant.

Shepherd was elected member of parliament for Bucklow at the 1945 general election and for Cheadle from 1950 until 1966, when he was defeated by the Liberal Dr. Michael Winstanley.

In Parliament, Shepherd served as a senior member of the Conservative Parliamentary Committee on Trade and Industry and wrote extensively on industrial and social matters.

He also spoke out against reform of anti-homosexual laws, once stating "The proper way to look at homosexuality is to regard it not as something separate but as something to which any of us can succumb if the circumstances of our lives or the weakness of our outlook make us susceptible."

During a parliamentary debate on the then newly-published Wolfenden Report on Homosexuality and Prostitution on Wednesday 26 November 1958, he the following in opposition of the decriminalisation of homosexuality:

"We ought to face the fact that homosexuality is unnatural and that in the majority of cases there are prospects of people of overcoming these tendencies. Incest is a much more natural act than homosexuality

In the 1980s, he joined the Social Democratic Party (SDP).

Parliament of the United Kingdom
New constituency	Member of Parliament for Bucklow; 1945–1950	constituency abolished
New constituency	Member of Parliament for Cheadle; 1950–1966	Succeeded by Michael Winstanley
