= 2005 Cheadle by-election =

2005 UK Parliamentary by-election

- 14 July 2005

Cheadle parliamentary seat
- Turnout: 55.2%
	First party	Second party
Candidate	Mark Hunter	Stephen Day
Party	Liberal Democrats	Conservative
Popular vote	19,593	15,936
Percentage	52.2%	42.4%
Swing	▲3.3%	▲2.0%
MP before election
Patsy Calton
Liberal Democrats
Subsequent MP
Mark Hunter
Liberal Democrats

Location of Cheadle within Greater Manchester

A by-election for the United Kingdom parliamentary constituency of Cheadle was held on 14 July 2005, following the death of incumbent Liberal Democrat MP Patsy Calton. It was won by Mark Hunter, who retained the seat for the Liberal Democrats.

The Conservative candidate was Stephen Day, who held the seat from 1987 to 2001, and was defeated by Calton in the 2005 general election two months earlier. The campaign was marred by accusations of dirty tricks and ruthless negative campaigning, principally accusing the Conservative campaign; in his victory speech, Hunter described the campaign of the Conservatives as 'nasty' and 'misleading'. Both the Liberal Democrats and a local newspaper threatened legal action over inaccuracies and defamation in Conservative campaign leaflets. The most significant example was a Conservative leaflet that superimposed a headline about Hunter's voting record on crime with a headline from a local newspaper about a rape, prompting the Liberal Democrats to threaten legal action.

With only 4.6% of the vote, the Labour Party candidate, Martin Miller, lost his deposit. Labour Party did not fight an energetic campaign in a seat that was a Liberal Democrat–Conservative marginal.

With the exception of the 1997 Winchester by-election, where the general election result was annulled, it was the first seat to be defended in a by-election by the Liberal Democrats since their formation in 1988.

== Result ==
Cheadle by-election, 2005
Party	Candidate	Votes	%	±%
Liberal Democrats	Mark Hunter	19,593	52.2	▲3.3
Conservative	Stephen Day	15,936	42.4	▲2.0
Labour	Martin Miller	1,739	4.6	▼4.2
Veritas	Leslie Leggett	218	0.6	New
Alliance for Change (UK)	John Allman	81	0.2	New
Majority		3,657	9.8	▲1.3
Turnout		37,567	55.2	▼14.4
Liberal Democrats hold		Swing	▲0.6	

== See also ==
- List of United Kingdom by-elections
