= Mark Hunter (politician) =

British politician

Leader of Stockport Metropolitan Borough Council
- In office 19 May 2022 – 20 May 2025
- Preceded by: Elise Wilson
- Succeeded by: Mark Roberts
- In office 14 May 2002 – 14 July 2005
- Preceded by: Fred Ridley
- Succeeded by: Brian Millard

Member of the Greater Manchester Combined Authority
- In office 19 May 2022 – 20 May 2025
- Preceded by: Elise Wilson
- Succeeded by: Mark Roberts

Councillor for Cheadle Hulme South
- Incumbent
- Assumed office 5 May 2016
- Preceded by: Lenny Grice
- Majority: 1,753 (37%)

Member of Parliament for Cheadle
- In office 14 July 2005 – 30 March 2015
- Preceded by: Patsy Calton
- Succeeded by: Mary Robinson

Councillor for Marple North
- In office 2 May 1996 – 4 May 2006
- Preceded by: Jacqueline Roberts
- Succeeded by: Craig Wright

Councillor for Droylsden West
- In office 1 May 1980 – 15 June 1989
- Preceded by: G. James
- Succeeded by: Ann Holland

Personal details
- Born: 25 July 1957 (age 69) Manchester, England
- Party: Liberal Democrat
- Website: www.markhunter.org.uk

Mark James Hunter (born 25 July 1957) is a British Liberal Democrat politician and former leader of Stockport Metropolitan Borough Council who became Member of Parliament (MP) for Cheadle at a 2005 by-election. At the 2015 general election, Hunter lost his seat to Mary Robinson of the Conservative Party. Hunter then returned to Stockport Metropolitan Borough Council, and served as the leader of from 19 May 2022 to 21 May 2025. As leader he was also a member of the Greater Manchester Combined Authority and was the combined authority's portfolio holder for Children and Young People. He has continued to serve as Councillor for Cheadle Hulme South.

== Education and background ==
Mark Hunter was educated at Audenshaw Grammar School for Boys and worked as a marketing executive for the Guardian Media Group until 2002.

== Political career ==
=== Before Parliament ===
Mark Hunter ran as the Liberal candidate in Ashton under Lyne in the 1987 general election, and as the Liberal Democrat candidate in Stockport in the 2001 general election. He was first elected to Stockport Metropolitan Borough Council in May 1996 for a ward in Marple, and served as chair of education before replacing Patsy Calton as deputy leader and executive member for regeneration in June 2001 when she stood down after becoming the local MP. In May 2002 he became leader of the council.

As Leader, Mark Hunter served on the North West Regional Authority. He was also elected to the Liberal Democrat executive on the Local Government Association.

=== Election to Parliament ===
When Patsy Calton died from cancer shortly after the 2005 general election, Mark Hunter was selected to follow her. Stephen Day who was MP prior to 2001 was selected as the Conservative Party candidate. In a by-election which saw accusations of 'dirty tricks' from all parties but was fairly low-profile (coming so soon after the general election), he managed to slightly increase the Liberal Democrat percentage of the vote on a lower turnout.

=== Parliamentary roles ===
Mark Hunter served as Liberal Democrat Deputy Chief Whip in the Coalition Government from 2010 until his resignation in 2014. From the election of Nick Clegg as leader of the Liberal Democrats in December 2007 to the 2010 general election, Hunter served as Clegg's Parliamentary Private Secretary (PPS) and the party's Transport Spokesman in the Commons.

Prior to this, Hunter had been a member of the Shadow Foreign Affairs team in 2007, Shadow Home Affairs team in 2006 and Shadow ODPM team in 2005.

Hunter was a member of the Business, Enterprise and Regulatory Reform Committee which replaced the Trade and Industry Select Committee (of which he was also a member) in November 2007. By virtue of sitting on the BERR committee, Hunter was also a member of the Quadripartite Committee on Strategic Export Controls.

In 2009 he tabled an early day motion to save payments by cheque which were due to be phased out.

=== 2015 general election ===
Mary Robinson defeated Mark Hunter with a majority of 6,453 on a 16.1% swing from the Liberal Democrats to the Conservatives. Hunter said that "sometimes you have to accept that you can't swim against the national tide."

=== 2017 general election ===
Mark Hunter failed to regain his seat in the Cheadle constituency during the 2017 general election.

=== Return to Stockport Council ===
Hunter re-joined Stockport Metropolitan Borough Council after winning election to the Cheadle Hulme South ward in 2016. He subsequently replaced Iain Roberts as leader of the Liberal Democrat Group, and opposition leader, in June 2017.

Following the 2022 local elections he was elected as the leader of the council, ousting Labour's Elise Wilson.

In March 2025 Hunter announced that he would step down as the council's leader in May. He continued to serve as a backbench councillor following his resignation.

== Elections contested ==
=== Parliamentary elections ===
Year	Constituency	Party	Votes	% votes	Position	Ref.
1987 general election	Ashton-under-Lyne	Liberal	7,760	18.0	3rd of 3	
2001 general election	Stockport	Liberal Democrats	5,490	15.5	3rd of 3	
2005 Cheadle by-election	Cheadle	Liberal Democrats	19,593	52.2	Won	
2010 general election	Cheadle	Liberal Democrats	24,717	47.1	Won	
2015 general election	Cheadle	Liberal Democrats	16,436	31.0	2nd of 7	
2017 general election	Cheadle	Liberal Democrats	19,824	36.3	2nd of 3	

=== Stockport Metropolitan Borough Council elections ===
Year	Ward	Party	Votes	% votes	Position	Ref.
1996	North Marple	Liberal Democrats	2,270	60.7	Won	
2000	North Marple	Liberal Democrats	1,853	60.0	Won	
2004	North Marple	Liberal Democrats	2,344	53.8	Elected	
2016	Cheadle Hulme South	Liberal Democrats	2,830	60.0	Won	
2021	Cheadle Hulme South	Liberal Democrats	2,888	61.0	Won	
2023	Cheadle Hulme South	Liberal Democrats	2,852	65.6	Won	

Parliament of the United Kingdom
Preceded by Patsy Calton	Member of Parliament for Cheadle; 2005–2015	Succeeded by Mary Robinson
Political offices
Preceded by Elise Wilson	Leader of Stockport Metropolitan Borough Council; 2022–present	Incumbent
