= Patsy Calton =

British politician (1948–2005)

- Official portrait, 2005

Member of Parliament for Cheadle
- In office 7 June 2001 – 29 May 2005
- Preceded by: Stephen Day
- Succeeded by: Mark Hunter

Personal details
- Born: Patricia Yeldon; 19 September 1948 Somerset, England
- Died: 29 May 2005 (aged 56) Stockport, England
- Party: Liberal Democrat
- Spouse: Clive Calton (m. 1969)
- Children: 3
- Education: Wymondham College
- Alma mater: UMIST
- Profession: Teacher

Patricia Calton (née Yeldon; 19 September 1948 – 29 May 2005) was a British Liberal Democrat politician who served as Member of Parliament (MP) for Cheadle in Greater Manchester.

She was first elected at the 2001 general election, with a 33-vote majority over the sitting Conservative MP Stephen Day. She held her seat in the 2005 general election with a majority of 4,020 votes over Stephen Day, despite being too ill with cancer to campaign personally. She died less than four weeks later, although she was sworn in as an MP five days before her death. She also stood at the 1992 general election and the 1997 general election. She had previously been a deputy leader of Stockport Metropolitan Borough Council. She is, to date, the only Liberal Democrat MP to have died in office since the party's foundation in 1988.

== Biography ==
Calton was born into a Royal Air Force family and as a result moved around frequently as a child. She began her schooling in Egypt while her father was posted there but most of her school days were spent at Wymondham College in Norfolk.

After her degree in biochemistry at the University of Manchester Institute of Science and Technology (UMIST), she took a Postgraduate Certificate in Education at the University of Manchester.

Either side of a career break while bringing up her family, she taught Chemistry in comprehensive schools in Greater Manchester and Cheshire. In June 2001 she left teaching for Parliament, her last school being Poynton High School, where she was head of Chemistry and head of Legh House.

In Parliament, she was a Liberal Democrat spokeswoman on Northern Ireland and on health, and was also chair of the all-party group on breast cancer.

She was married to her husband Clive in 1969. They had three children; Libby, Andrew and Catherine and one grandchild named Bethany. The family lived in Bramhall for most of their married life and all the children were educated at local schools — Pownall Green Primary and Bramhall High School — and then at Stockport's sixth form colleges.

Calton was first diagnosed with breast cancer following the 1997 election campaign. She recovered after she had undergone a double mastectomy the same year. She ran the London Marathon four times to raise money for Macmillan Nurses. In February 2005 the cancer recurred, this time in the spine. She died in Stockport on 29 May 2005. A few days before her death, she entered the House of Commons in a wheelchair to affirm her allegiance. Speaker Michael Martin broke with tradition, leaving the Speaker's Chair to shake Calton's hand, said "welcome home Patsy," and kissed her cheek.

After her death, Breakthrough Breast Cancer established the Breakthrough Patsy Calton Award in her honour to recognise exceptional achievement by parliamentarians in campaigning for improvements in breast cancer research, services and/or the patient experience.

Parliament of the United Kingdom
Preceded by Stephen Day	Member of Parliament for Cheadle; 2001–2005	Succeeded by Mark Hunter
