= Cheadle Hulme South =

Electoral ward in Greater Manchester, England

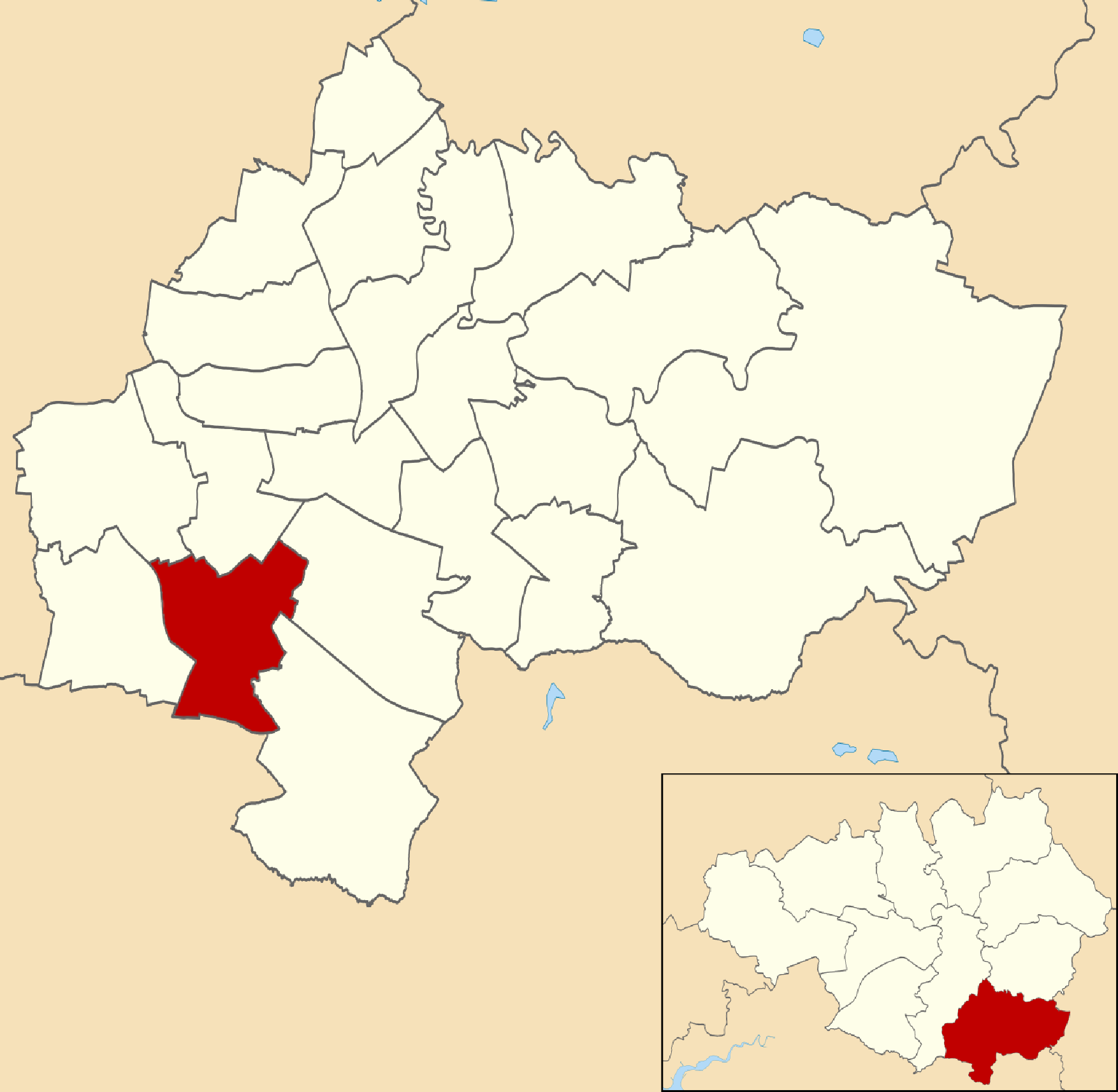
- Cheadle Hulme South within Stockport
- Population: 10,477 (2010)
- Country: England
- Sovereign state: United Kingdom
- UK Parliament: Cheadle
- Councillors: Helen Foster-Grime (Liberal Democrat); Suzanne Wyatt (Liberal Democrat); Mark Hunter (Liberal Democrat)

Cheadle Hulme South is an electoral ward in the Metropolitan Borough of Stockport. It elects three Councillors to Stockport Metropolitan Borough Council using the first past the post electoral method, electing one Councillor every year without election on the fourth.

It covers the southern part of Cheadle Hulme and contains Cheadle Hulme Station, as well the Cheadle Conservative and Liberal Democrat Constituency offices. The ward has Cheadle Hulme High School located on Woods Lane. Together with Bramhall North, Bramhall South, Cheadle and Gatley, Cheadle Hulme North, Heald Green and Stepping Hill Wards it makes up the Cheadle Parliamentary Constituency.

== Councillors ==
Cheadle Hulme South electoral ward is represented in Westminster by Mary Robinson MP for Cheadle.

The ward is represented on Stockport Council by three councillors: Helen Foster-Grime (Lib Dem), Suzanne Wyatt (Lib Dem), and Mark Hunter (Lib Dem).

Election	Councillor	Councillor	Councillor
2004	Stuart Bodsworth (Lib Dem)	Suzanne Wyatt (Lib Dem)	Ingrid Shaw (Lib Dem)
2006	Stuart Bodsworth (Lib Dem)	Suzanne Wyatt (Lib Dem)	Ingrid Shaw (Lib Dem)
2007	Stuart Bodsworth (Lib Dem)	Suzanne Wyatt (Lib Dem)	Ingrid Shaw (Lib Dem)
2008	Stuart Bodsworth (Lib Dem)	Suzanne Wyatt (Lib Dem)	Lenny Grice (Lib Dem)
2010	Stuart Bodsworth (Lib Dem)	Suzanne Wyatt (Lib Dem)	Lenny Grice (Lib Dem)
2011	Stuart Bodsworth (Lib Dem)	Suzanne Wyatt (Lib Dem)	Lenny Grice (Lib Dem)
2012	Stuart Bodsworth (Lib Dem)	Suzanne Wyatt (Lib Dem)	Lenny Grice (Lib Dem)
2014	Stuart Bodsworth (Lib Dem)	Suzanne Wyatt (Lib Dem)	Lenny Grice (Lib Dem)
2015	Stuart Bodsworth (Lib Dem)	Suzanne Wyatt (Lib Dem)	Lenny Grice (Lib Dem)
2016	Stuart Bodsworth (Lab)	Suzanne Wyatt (Lib Dem)	Mark Hunter (Lib Dem)
2018	Helen Foster-Grime (Lib Dem)	Suzanne Wyatt (Lib Dem)	Mark Hunter (Lib Dem)
2019	Helen Foster-Grime (Lib Dem)	Suzanne Wyatt (Lib Dem)	Mark Hunter (Lib Dem)
2021	Helen Foster-Grime (Lib Dem)	Suzanne Wyatt (Lib Dem)	Mark Hunter (Lib Dem)
2022	Helen Foster-Grime (Lib Dem)	Suzanne Wyatt (Lib Dem)	Mark Hunter (Lib Dem)

indicates seat up for re-election. indicates councillor defected.

== Elections in the 2020s ==
=== May 2021 ===
2021
Party	Candidate	Votes	%	±%
Liberal Democrats	Mark Hunter	2,888	61	
Conservative	Brian Dougal	1135	24	
Labour	James Paul Mason	428	9	
Green	Chitra Ramachandran	191	4	
Reform	Taff Davies	76	2	
Independent	Paul Davies	32	1	
Majority		1,753		
Turnout		4,750	44	
Liberal Democrats hold		Swing		

== Elections in the 2010s ==
=== May 2019 ===
2019
Party	Candidate	Votes	%	±%
Liberal Democrats	Suzanne Wyatt	2,149	55	
Conservative	Mark Anthony Littlewood	890	23	
Labour	Martin Miller	373	9	
UKIP	Cyril Arthur Peake	295	8	
Green	Malcolm Brown	220	6	
Majority		1,259		
Turnout		3,927	37	
Liberal Democrats hold		Swing		

=== May 2018 ===
2018
Party	Candidate	Votes	%	±%
Liberal Democrats	Helen Foster-Grime	2,267	56	
Conservative	Sue Carroll	1,144	28	
Labour	Anthony Hay	424	10	
Green	Clare Brown	142	3	
UKIP	Cyril Peake	92	2	
Majority		1,123		
Turnout		4,069	38	
Liberal Democrats gain from Labour		Swing		

=== May 2016 ===
2016
Party	Candidate	Votes	%	±%
Liberal Democrats	Mark Hunter	2,830	60	
Conservative	Stephen Robinson	1,060	23	
Labour	Chris Carter	335	7	
UKIP	Cyril Peake	335	7	
Green	Clare Brown	136	3	
Majority		1,770		
Turnout		4,696	45	
Liberal Democrats hold		Swing		

=== May 2015 ===
2015
Party	Candidate	Votes	%	±%
Liberal Democrats	Suzanne Wyatt*	2,907	37	
Conservative	Debbie Robinson	2,769	35	
Labour	Chris Carter	984	13	
UKIP	Cyril Peake	785	10	
Green	Philippa Tomczak	420	5	
Majority		138		
Turnout		7,865	73	
Liberal Democrats hold		Swing		

=== May 2014 ===
2014
Party	Candidate	Votes	%	±%
Liberal Democrats	Stuart Andrew Bodsworth	1,630	41%	−5.86%
Conservative	Paul Davies	1104	27%	−1.90%
UKIP	Cyril Arthur Peake	703	17%	+7.23%
Labour	Chris Carter	582	14%	−0.46%
Majority		526	14%	−3.96%
Turnout		4019		
Liberal Democrats hold		Swing		

=== May 2012 ===
Cheadle Hulme South
Party	Candidate	Votes	%	±%
Liberal Democrats	Lenny Grice	1,876	46.86	−4.47
Conservative	Julie Smith-Jones	1,157	28.90	−10.54
Labour	Theo Smith	579	14.46	+11.43
UKIP	Cyril Peake	391	9.77	+6.85
Majority		719	17.96	
Turnout		4,015	37.76	
Liberal Democrats hold		Swing		

=== May 2011 ===
2011
Party	Candidate	Votes	%	±%
Liberal Democrats	Suzanne Wyatt	2,069	42.4	−11.8
Conservative	Brian Dougal	1,729	35.4	−1.5
Labour	Theo Smith	767	15.7	+7.3
UKIP	Cyril Peake	283	5.8	+5.8
Majority		340		
Turnout		4,881	45.85	
Liberal Democrats hold		Swing		
