= Cheadle (constituency) =

Parliamentary constituency in the United Kingdom, 1950 onwards

Coordinates: 53.396°N 2.204°W

- Borough constituency for the House of Commons
- Interactive map of boundaries since 2010
- Location within North West England
- County: Greater Manchester
- Population: 91,023 (2011 census)
- Electorate: 73,775 (March 2020)
- Major settlements: Cheadle, Cheadle Hulme, Bramhall

Current constituency
- Created: 1950
- Member of Parliament: Tom Morrison (Liberal Democrats)
- Seats: One
- Created from: Bucklow (Majority), Macclesfield and Knutsford
- During its existence contributed to new seat(s) of: Hazel Grove (1974); Tatton (1983)

Cheadle is a borough constituency represented in the House of Commons of the Parliament of the United Kingdom since 2024 by Tom Morrison of the Liberal Democrats. It elects one Member of Parliament (MP) by the first-past-the-post voting system.

It is a marginal seat between the Conservatives and the Liberal Democrats. From 1970 until 2001, it was held by the Conservatives, after which it was held by the Liberal Democrats from 2001 until the 2015 general election, when it was taken back by the Conservatives. It was regained by the Liberal Democrats at the 2024 general election.

== Constituency profile ==
The Cheadle constituency is located in the Metropolitan Borough of Stockport in Greater Manchester. It is suburban in character and includes the neighbourhoods of Cheadle, Cheadle Hulme, Heald Green and Bramhall. The area is highly affluent; house prices are considerably higher than the rest of North West England and most of the constituency falls within the 10% least-deprived areas in England.

Residents of the constituency are older than average and have high levels of homeownership, income, education and professional employment. White people make up 83% of the population and Asians, mostly Pakistanis, are the largest ethnic minority group at 12%. Most of the constituency is represented by Liberal Democrats at the local borough council, with some Labour Party and independent councillors elected in Cheadle village and Heald Green, respectively. An estimated 58% of voters in the constituency supported remaining in the European Union in the 2016 referendum, compared to 48% nationally.

== Boundaries ==
=== Historic ===
1950–1955: The Urban Districts of Bredbury and Romiley, Cheadle and Gatley, Hazel Grove and Bramhall, and Marple.

Cheadle and Gatley, previously part of the abolished constituency of Bucklow, Hazel Grove and Bramhall transferred from Knutsford, and Bredbury, Romiley and Marple transferred from Macclesfield. Also included Mellor (now part of the Urban District of Marple), which was previously in the Derbyshire constituency of High Peak.

1955–1974: As above except the part of Bredbury ward added to the County Borough of Stockport by the Stockport (Extension) Order 1952, which was transferred to Stockport South (Statutory Instrument 1953–742).

1974–1983: The Urban Districts of Cheadle and Gatley, and Wilmslow.

The majority of the constituency was hived off to form Hazel Grove, leaving just Cheadle and Gatley. Partly compensated by the transfer of Wilmslow from Macclesfield.

From 1 April 1974 until the next boundary review came into effect for the 1983 general election, the constituency comprised parts of the Metropolitan Borough of Stockport in Greater Manchester (Cheadle and Gatley) and parts of the expanded Borough of Macclesfield in Cheshire (Wilmslow), but its boundaries were unchanged.

1983–2010: The Metropolitan Borough of Stockport wards of Cheadle, Cheadle Hulme North, Cheadle Hulme South, East Bramhall, Heald Green, and West Bramhall.

Wilmslow included in the new constituency of Tatton in Cheshire, with smaller parts transferred to Macclesfield and Stockport; Bramhall transferred from Hazel Grove.

2010–2023: The Metropolitan Borough of Stockport wards of Bramhall North, Bramhall South, Cheadle and Gatley, Cheadle Hulme North, Cheadle Hulme South, Heald Green, and Stepping Hill.

Boundaries adjusted to take account of revision of local authority wards.

=== Current ===
Following a local government boundary review which came into effect in May 2023, the constituency now comprises the following wards or part wards of the Metropolitan Borough of Stockport:

- Bramhall North, Bramhall South & Woodford, Cheadle East & Cheadle Hulme North (part), Cheadle West & Gatley, Cheadle Hulme South, Davenport & Cale Green (small part), Heald Green, Norbury & Woodsmoor (part), Offerton (part), and a very small part of Hazel Grove.

The 2023 review of Westminster constituencies, which was based on the ward structure in place at 1 December 2020, left the boundaries unchanged.

== History ==
Cheadle was created as a county constituency under the Representation of the People Act 1948, for the 1950 general election. it covered a predominantly urban and relatively affluent area in the south-eastern suburbs of the Manchester conurbation.

The growth of the suburbs of Manchester led to a rapidly rising electorate from the late 1950s and by the 1970 election there were 107,225 electors and some reduction was inevitable. At the February 1974 general election the seat was re-classified as a borough constituency and split in two, with the eastern parts forming the new Hazel Grove constituency.

As a result of changes to the county boundaries which came into effect on 1 April 1974, the constituency crossed between Greater Manchester and Cheshire. Realigning with the county boundaries in 1983, the constituency was redrawn, losing Wilmslow to Tatton, whilst gaining back Bramhall from Hazel Grove.

== Members of Parliament ==
The current MP is the Liberal Democrat Tom Morrison, who defeated Mary Robinson at the 2024 General Election.

From 1974 (when half of the seat was split off to create the Hazel Grove constituency), Cheadle had safe Conservative majorities until the 1997 election, when the Liberal Democrats reduced the margin to around 3,000 votes. Patsy Calton scraped home in 2001 by a majority of 33 votes, the narrowest in the House of Commons, but returned with a much safer 4,000 votes in 2005. She died on 29 May 2005, triggering a by-election in July 2005, where Mark Hunter was elected with a majority of 3,657. Although held by Hunter in 2010, the Conservatives regained the seat in 2015 and held it in 2017 and 2019, albeit with reduced majorities on each occasion.

Election	Member	Party	Notes
1950	William Shepherd	Conservative	Member for Bucklow (1945–1950)
1966	Michael Winstanley	Liberal	
1970	Tom Normanton	Conservative	
Constituency split, majority renamed Hazel Grove, minority merged with part of Knutsford
Feb 1974	Tom Normanton	Conservative	
1987	Stephen Day	Conservative	
2001	Patsy Calton	Liberal Democrats	
2005 by-election	Mark Hunter	Liberal Democrats	
2015	Mary Robinson	Conservative	
2024	Tom Morrison	Liberal Democrats	

== Election results 2010–present ==
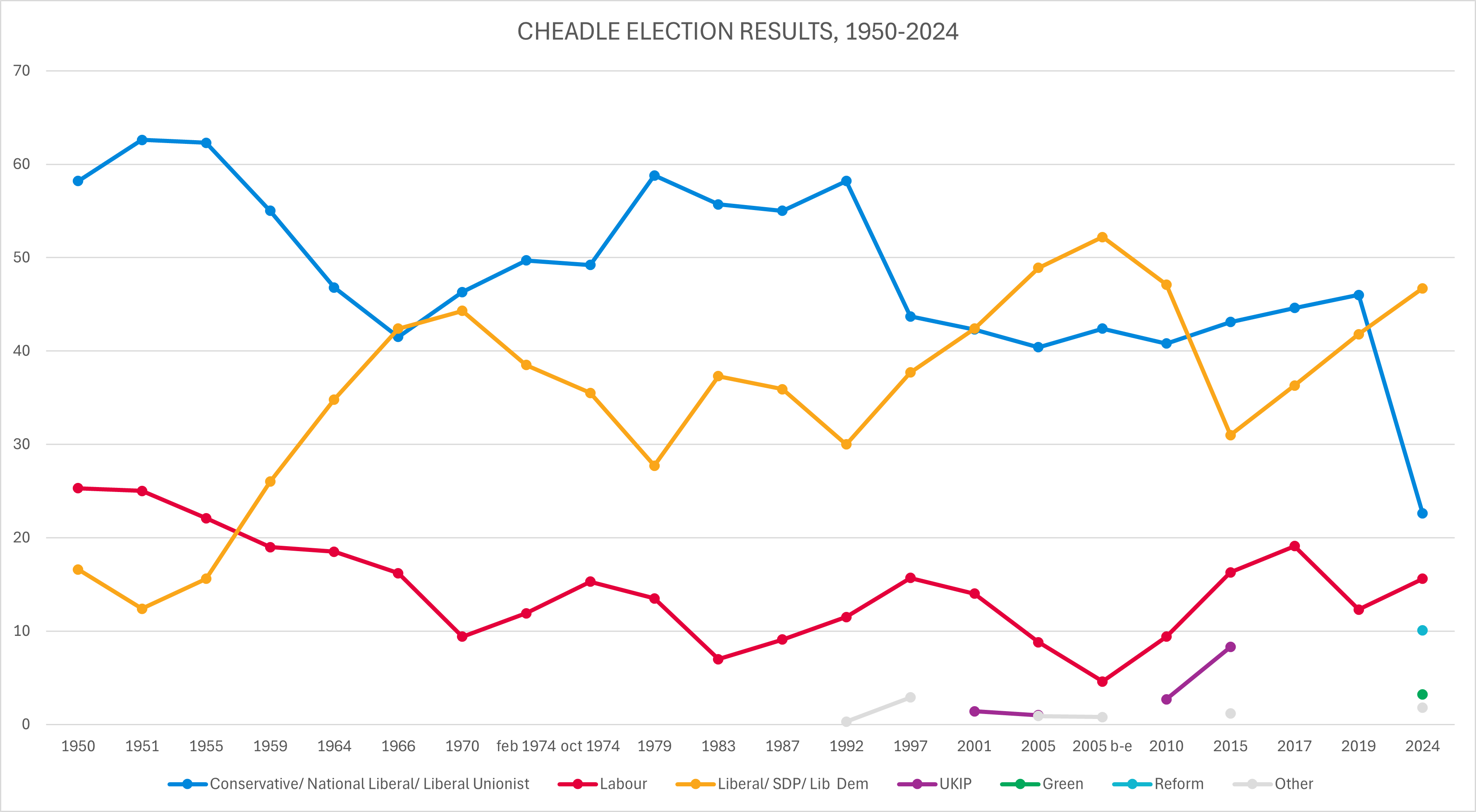
Election results 1950–2024

=== Elections in the 2020s ===
General election 2024: Cheadle
Party	Candidate	Votes	%	±%
Liberal Democrats	Tom Morrison	23,681	46.7	+4.9
Conservative	Mary Robinson	11,446	22.6	−23.4
Labour	Kelly Fowler	7,909	15.6	+3.3
Reform	Stephen Speakman	5,149	10.1	N/A
Green	Alexander Drury	1,630	3.2	N/A
Workers Party	Tanya Manzoor	811	1.6	N/A
Independent	Marcus Farmer	105	0.2	N/A
Rejected ballots		110		
Majority		12,235	24.1	N/A
Turnout		50,731	68.2	−6.8
Registered electors		74,385		–0.3
Liberal Democrats gain from Conservative		Swing	+14.2	

=== Elections in the 2010s ===
General election 2019: Cheadle
Party	Candidate	Votes	%	±%
Conservative	Mary Robinson	25,694	46.0	+1.4
Liberal Democrats	Tom Morrison	23,358	41.8	+5.5
Labour	Zahid Chauhan	6,851	12.3	−6.8
Majority		2,336	4.2	−4.1
Turnout		55,903	75.0	–0.0
Registered electors		74,577		+2.4
Conservative hold		Swing	−2.0	

General election 2017: Cheadle
Party	Candidate	Votes	%	±%
Conservative	Mary Robinson	24,331	44.6	+1.5
Liberal Democrats	Mark Hunter	19,824	36.3	+5.4
Labour	Martin Miller	10,417	19.1	+2.8
Majority		4,507	8.3	−3.9
Turnout		54,572	75.0	+2.5
Registered electors		72,780		–0.6
Conservative hold		Swing	−1.9	

General election 2015: Cheadle
Party	Candidate	Votes	%	±%
Conservative	Mary Robinson	22,889	43.1	+2.3
Liberal Democrats	Mark Hunter	16,436	31.0	−16.1
Labour	Martin Miller	8,673	16.3	+6.9
UKIP	Shaun Hopkins	4,423	8.3	+5.6
Independent	Matthew Torbitt	390	0.7	N/A
Above and Beyond	Drew Carswell	208	0.4	N/A
Independence from Europe	Helen Bashford	76	0.1	N/A
Majority		6,453	12.1	N/A
Turnout		53,095	72.5	+0.0
Registered electors		73,239		+1.1
Conservative gain from Liberal Democrats		Swing	+9.2	

General election 2010: Cheadle
Party	Candidate	Votes	%	±%
Liberal Democrats	Mark Hunter	24,717	47.1	−0.7
Conservative	Ben Jeffreys	21,445	40.8	+0.5
Labour	Martin Miller	4,920	9.4	−0.5
UKIP	Tony Moore	1,430	2.7	+1.5
Majority		3,272	6.2	−1.2
Turnout		52,512	72.5	+3.7
Registered electors		72,458		+0.5
Liberal Democrats hold		Swing	−0.6	

2005 notional result
Party	Vote	%
Liberal Democrats	23,671	47.8
Conservative	19,999	40.3
Labour	4,889	9.9
UKIP	584	1.2
BNP	421	0.8
Turnout	49,564	68.7
Electorate	72,103	

== Election results 1974–2010 ==
=== Elections in the 2000s ===
By-election 2005: Cheadle
Party	Candidate	Votes	%	±%
Liberal Democrats	Mark Hunter	19,593	52.2	+3.3
Conservative	Stephen Day	15,936	42.4	+2.0
Labour	Martin Miller	1,739	4.6	―4.2
Veritas	Leslie Leggett	218	0.6	N/A
Alliance for Change	John Allman	81	0.2	N/A
Majority		3,657	9.7	+1.3
Turnout		37,567	55.2	―14.4
Registered electors		68,051		–0.1
Liberal Democrats hold		Swing	+0.6	

General election 2005: Cheadle
Party	Candidate	Votes	%	±%
Liberal Democrats	Patsy Calton	23,189	48.9	+6.5
Conservative	Stephen Day	19,169	40.4	―1.9
Labour	Martin Miller	4,169	8.8	―5.2
UKIP	Vincent Cavanagh	489	1.0	―0.4
BNP	Richard Chadfield	421	0.9	N/A
Majority		4,020	8.5	+8.4
Turnout		47,437	69.6	+6.4
Registered electors		68,123		–1.3
Liberal Democrats hold		Swing	+4.2	

General election 2001: Cheadle
Party	Candidate	Votes	%	±%
Liberal Democrats	Patsy Calton	18,477	42.4	+4.7
Conservative	Stephen Day	18,444	42.3	–1.4
Labour	Howard Dawber	6,086	14.0	–1.8
UKIP	Vincent Cavanagh	599	1.4	N/A
Majority		33	0.1	N/A
Turnout		43,606	63.2	―14.1
Registered electors		69,002		+2.0
Liberal Democrats gain from Conservative		Swing	+3.1	

=== Elections in the 1990s ===
The Cheadle constituency underwent minor boundary changes after the 1992 general election and as such the change in share of vote is based on a notional calculation.

General election 1997: Cheadle
Party	Candidate	Votes	%	±%
Conservative	Stephen Day	22,944	43.7	–13.9
Liberal Democrats	Patsy Calton	19,755	37.7	+8.1
Labour	Paul Diggett	8,253	15.7	+3.3
Referendum	Paul Brook	1,511	2.9	N/A
Majority		3,189	6.0	–21.8
Turnout		52,463	77.3	−6.9
Registered electors		67,627		–1.7
Conservative hold		Swing	−11.0	

1992 notional result
Party	Vote	%
Conservative	32,804	57.7
Liberal Democrats	16,828	29.6
Labour	7,080	12.4
Others	183	0.3
Turnout	56,895	82.7
Electorate	68,789	

General election 1992: Cheadle
Party	Candidate	Votes	%	±%
Conservative	Stephen Day	32,504	58.2	+3.2
Liberal Democrats	Patsy Calton	16,726	30.0	−5.9
Labour	Sandra Broadhurst	6,442	11.5	+2.4
Natural Law	Phillipa Whittle	168	0.3	N/A
Majority		15,778	28.3	+9.1
Turnout		55,840	84.4	+3.4
Registered electors		66,131		–3.3
Conservative hold		Swing	+4.5	

=== Elections in the 1980s ===
General election 1987: Cheadle
Party	Candidate	Votes	%	±%
Conservative	Stephen Day	30,484	55.0	−0.7
Liberal	Brian Leah	19,853	35.9	−1.4
Labour	Ann Coffey	5,037	9.1	+2.1
Majority		10,631	19.1	+0.7
Turnout		55,374	81.0	+4.2
Registered electors		68,332		+2.7
Conservative hold		Swing	+0.4	

The boundaries of the constituency changed in 1983. Changes in the vote are based on the estimated results for 1979 had the 1983 boundaries been in operation then.

General election 1983: Cheadle
Party	Candidate	Votes	%	±%
Conservative	Tom Normanton	28,452	55.7	−4.5
Liberal	Paul Clark	19,072	37.3	+9.0
Labour	Kenneth Parker	3,553	7.0	−4.5
Majority		9,380	18.4	–13.5
Turnout		51,077	76.8	−5.0
Registered electors		66,474		
Conservative hold		Swing	–6.8	

1979 notional result
Party	Vote	%
Conservative	32,217	60.2
Liberal	15,146	28.3
Labour	6,139	11.5
Turnout	53,502	
Electorate		

=== Elections in the 1970s ===
General election 1979: Cheadle
Party	Candidate	Votes	%	±%
Conservative	Tom Normanton	32,407	58.8	+9.7
Liberal	David Austick	15,268	27.7	−7.8
Labour	Frances Done	7,415	13.5	−1.8
Majority		17,139	31.1	+17.5
Turnout		55,090	81.8	+1.6
Registered electors		67,362		+2.7
Conservative hold		Swing	+8.7	

General election October 1974: Cheadle
Party	Candidate	Votes	%	±%
Conservative	Tom Normanton	25,863	49.2	−0.5
Liberal	Christopher Green	18,687	35.5	−2.9
Labour	Paul Castle	8,048	15.3	+3.4
Majority		7,176	13.7	+2.5
Turnout		52,598	80.2	−5.2
Registered electors		65,558		+0.9
Conservative hold		Swing	+1.2	

After the 1970 general election, boundary changes created the Hazel Grove constituency which reduced the size of the Cheadle one. The previous Member of Parliament for Cheadle, Dr Michael Winstanley became the first member returned by Hazel Grove.

General election February 1974: Cheadle
Party	Candidate	Votes	%	±%
Conservative	Tom Normanton	27,556	49.7	–1.3
Liberal	Christopher Green	21,332	38.5	+2.3
Labour	Paul Castle	6,584	11.9	–0.9
Majority		6,224	11.2	–3.6
Turnout		55,472	85.4	+7.2
Registered electors		64,942		+3.2
Conservative hold		Swing	–1.8	

1970 notional result
Party	Vote	%
Conservative	25,100	51.0
Liberal	17,800	36.2
Labour	6,300	12.8
Turnout	49,200	78.2
Electorate	62,891	

== Election results 1950–1974 ==
=== Elections in the 1970s ===
General election 1970: Cheadle
Party	Candidate	Votes	%	±%
Conservative	Tom Normanton	39,728	46.3	+4.8
Liberal	Michael Winstanley	37,974	44.3	+1.9
Labour	Roger Stott	8,062	9.4	−6.8
Majority		1,754	2.0	N/A
Turnout		85,764	79.9	−2.5
Registered electors		107,331		
Conservative gain from Liberal		Swing	+3.3	

=== Elections in the 1960s ===
General election 1966: Cheadle
Party	Candidate	Votes	%	±%
Liberal	Michael Winstanley	32,071	42.4	+7.6
Conservative	William Shepherd	31,416	41.5	−5.3
Labour	Sholto Moxley	12,244	16.2	−2.3
Majority		655	0.9	N/A
Turnout		75,731	82.4	−1.2
Registered electors				
Liberal gain from Conservative		Swing	+6.7	

General election 1964: Cheadle
Party	Candidate	Votes	%	±%
Conservative	William Shepherd	33,911	46.8	−8.2
Liberal	Roger Cuss	25,220	34.8	+8.8
Labour	Sholto Moxley	13,379	18.5	−0.6
Majority		8,691	12.0	−17.0
Turnout		72,510	83.6	−0.1
Registered electors				
Conservative hold		Swing	−8.5	

=== Elections in the 1950s ===
General election 1959: Cheadle
Party	Candidate	Votes	%	±%
Conservative	William Shepherd	32,787	55.0	−7.3
Liberal	Roger Cuss	15,469	26.0	+10.4
Labour	Charles Morris	11,373	19.0	−3.1
Majority		17,318	29.0	−11.2
Turnout		59,629	83.7	+3.1
Registered electors				
Conservative hold		Swing	−8.9	

General election 1955: Cheadle
Party	Candidate	Votes	%	±%
Conservative	William Shepherd	30,940	62.3	−0.3
Labour	Harry V. Stone	10,966	22.1	−2.9
Liberal	Ronald Palmer	7,756	15.6	+3.2
Majority		19,974	40.2	+2.6
Turnout		49,662	80.6	−5.1
Registered electors				
Conservative hold		Swing	+1.3	

General election 1951: Cheadle
Party	Candidate	Votes	%	±%
Conservative	William Shepherd	32,369	62.6	+4.4
Labour	Hatton Jones	12,910	25.0	−0.3
Liberal	George Samways	6,388	12.4	−4.2
Majority		19,459	37.6	+4.8
Turnout		51,667	85.7	−3.2
Registered electors				
Conservative hold		Swing	+2.4	

General election 1950: Cheadle
Party	Candidate	Votes	%
Conservative	William Shepherd	30,740	58.2
Labour	Hatton Jones	13,389	25.3
Liberal	George Samways	8,801	16.6
Majority		17,351	32.8
Turnout		52,930	88.9
Registered electors			
Conservative win (new seat)			

== See also ==
- List of parliamentary constituencies in Greater Manchester
- History of parliamentary constituencies and boundaries in Cheshire

== Sources ==
- Election result, 2005
- Election results, 1997 – 2001
- Election results, 1983 – 1992
- Election results, 1959 – 2001
- F.W.S. Craig. British Parliamentary Election Results 1950–1973. ISBN 0-900178-07-8
