= Parliamentary constituencies in Greater Manchester =

The ceremonial and metropolitan county of Greater Manchester is divided into 27 parliamentary constituencies—19 borough constituencies and 8 county constituencies. At the 2024 general election in Greater Manchester, Labour won 25 seats and the Liberal Democrats won 2.

== Constituencies ==
Conservative Party Green Party Independent Labour Party Liberal Democrats Reform UK Workers Party of Britain

Constituency (Note: BC denotes borough constituency, CC denotes county constituency.)	Electorate	Majority	Member of Parliament	Nearest opposition	Map
Altrincham and Sale West BC	74,026	4,174	Connor Rand (Lab)	Oliver Carroll (Con)	Boundary of Altrincham and Sale West in Greater Manchester
Ashton-under-Lyne BC	71,002	6,791	Angela Rayner (Lab)	Robert Barrowcliffe (Ref)	Boundary of Ashton-under-Lyne in Greater Manchester
Blackley and Middleton South BC	72,097	10,220	Graham Stringer (Lab)	Alison Devine (Ref)	Boundary of Blackley and Middleton South in Greater Manchester
Bolton North East BC	80,011	6,653	Kirith Entwistle (Lab)	Adele Warren (Con)	Boundary of Bolton North East in Greater Manchester
Bolton South and Walkden BC	79,622	6,743	Yasmin Qureshi (Lab)	Julie Pattison (Ref)	Boundary of Bolton South and Walkden in Greater Manchester
Bolton West CC	74,933	4,945	Phil Brickell (Lab)	Chris Green (Con)	Boundary of Bolton West in Greater Manchester
Bury North BC	77,703	6,944	James Frith (Lab)	James Daly (Con)	Boundary of Bury North in Greater Manchester
Bury South BC	75,339	9,361	Christian Wakeford (Lab)	Arnie Saunders (Con)	Boundary of Bury South in Greater Manchester
Cheadle BC	74,385	12,235	Tom Morrison (Lib Dem)	Mary Robinson (Con)	Boundary of Cheadle in Greater Manchester
Gorton and Denton BC	78,125	4,402	Hannah Spencer (Grn)	Matt Goodwin (Ref)	Boundary of Gorton and Denton in Greater Manchester
Hazel Grove CC	72,843	6,500	Lisa Smart (Lib Dem)	Claire Vibert (Lab)	Boundary of Hazel Grove in Greater Manchester
Heywood and Middleton North CC	74,786	6,082	Elsie Blundell (Lab)	Steve Potter (Ref)	Boundary of Heywood and Middleton North in Greater Manchester
Leigh and Atherton BC	79,978	8,881	Jo Platt (Labour Co-op)	George Woodward (Ref)	Boundary of Leigh and Atherton in Greater Manchester
Makerfield BC	76,641	9,231	Andy Burnham (Labour Co-op)	Robert Kenyon (Ref)	Boundary of Makerfield in Greater Manchester
Manchester Central BC	85,049	13,797	Lucy Powell (Labour Co-op)	Ekua Bayunu (Grn)	Boundary of Manchester Central in Greater Manchester
Manchester Rusholme BC	72,604	8,235	Afzal Khan (Lab)	Thirza Asanga-Rae (Grn)	Boundary of Manchester Rusholme in Greater Manchester
Manchester Withington BC	70,549	13,982	Jeff Smith (Lab)	Sam Easterby-Smith (Grn)	Boundary of Manchester Withington in Greater Manchester
Oldham East and Saddleworth CC	72,760	6,357	Debbie Abrahams (Lab)	Jacob Barden (Ref)	Boundary of Oldham East and Saddleworth in Greater Manchester
Oldham West, Chadderton and Royton BC	75,346	4,976	Jim McMahon (Labour Co-op)	Zaffar Iqbal (Ind)	Boundary of Oldham West, Chadderton and Royton in Greater Manchester
Rochdale CC	71,264	1,440	Paul Waugh (Lab)	George Galloway (Workers Party)	Boundary of Rochdale in Greater Manchester
Salford BC	83,633	15,101	Rebecca Long-Bailey (Lab)	Keith Whalley (Ref)	Boundary of Salford in Greater Manchester
Stalybridge and Hyde CC	72,265	8,539	Jonathan Reynolds (Labour Co-op)	Barbara Kaya (Ref)	Boundary of Stalybridge and Hyde in Greater Manchester
Stockport BC	76,625	15,270	Navendu Mishra (Lab)	Lynn Schofield (Ref)	Boundary of Stockport in Greater Manchester
Stretford and Urmston BC	75,153	16,150	Andrew Western (Lab)	Mark Cornes (Con)	Boundary of Stretford and Urmston in Greater Manchester
Wigan CC	77,538	9,549	Lisa Nandy (Lab)	Andy Dawber (Ref)	Boundary of Wigan in Greater Manchester
Worsley and Eccles CC	78,643	11,091	Michael Wheeler (Lab)	Craig Birtwistle (Ref)	Boundary of Worsley and Eccles in Greater Manchester
Wythenshawe and Sale East BC	77,765	14,610	Mike Kane (Lab)	Julie Fousert (Ref)	Boundary of Wythenshawe and Sale East in Greater Manchester

== Boundary changes ==
=== 2024 ===
See 2023 review of Westminster constituencies for further details.

Name (2010–2024)	Boundaries (2010–2024)	Name (2024–present)	Boundaries (2024–present)
1. Altrincham and Sale West BC; 2. Ashton-under-Lyne BC; 3. Blackley and Broughton BC; 4. Bolton North East BC; 5. Bolton South East BC; 6. Bolton West CC; 7. Bury North BC; 8. Bury South BC; 9. Cheadle BC; 10. Denton and Reddish BC; 11. Hazel Grove CC; 12. Heywood and Middleton CC; 13. Leigh CC; 14. Makerfield CC; 15. Manchester Central BC; 16. Manchester, Gorton BC; 17. Manchester, Withington BC; 18. Oldham East and Saddleworth CC; 19. Oldham West and Royton BC; 20. Rochdale CC; 21. Salford and Eccles BC; 22. Stalybridge and Hyde CC; 23. Stockport BC; 24. Stretford and Urmston BC; 25. Wigan CC; 26. Worsley and Eccles South CC; 27. Wythenshawe and Sale East BC	Parliamentary constituencies in Greater Manchester (2010–2024)	1. Altrincham and Sale West BC; 2. Ashton-under-Lyne BC; 3. Blackley and Middleton South BC; 4. Bolton North East BC; 5. Bolton South and Walkden BC; 6. Bolton West CC; 7. Bury North BC; 8. Bury South BC; 9. Cheadle BC; 10. Hazel Grove CC; 11. Heywood and Middleton North CC; 12. Gorton and Denton BC; 13. Leigh and Atherton BC; 14. Makerfield BC; 15. Manchester Central BC; 16. Manchester Rusholme BC; 17. Manchester Withington BC; 18. Oldham East and Saddleworth CC; 19. Oldham West, Chadderton and Royton BC; 20. Rochdale CC; 21. Salford BC; 22. Stalybridge and Hyde CC; 23. Stockport BC; 24. Stretford and Urmston BC; 25. Wigan CC; 26. Worsley and Eccles CC; 27. Wythenshawe and Sale East BC	Parliamentary constituencies in Greater Manchester (2024–present)

For the 2023 review of Westminster constituencies, which redrew the constituency map ahead of the 2024 general election, the Boundary Commission for England proposed that Greater Manchester be treated as a sub-region of the North West Region, retaining a total of 27 constituencies. However, significant changes were made to realign boundaries with revised ward boundaries and to ensure electorates were within the statutory range. Denton and Reddish was abolished and divided, and Manchester Rusholme was re-established, resulting in major reconfigurations of the Manchester Central and Manchester Gorton constituencies, with the latter renamed Gorton and Denton. Other boundary changes resulted in the following name changes:

Previous name	Revised name
Blackley and Broughton	Blackley and Middleton South
Bolton South East	Bolton South and Walkden
Heywood and Middleton	Heywood and Middleton North
Leigh	Leigh and Atherton
Salford and Eccles	Salford
Worsley and Eccles South	Worsley and Eccles

In addition, although unchanged, Oldham West and Royton was renamed Oldham West, Chadderton and Royton.

The following are the constituencies in place following the changes:

Containing electoral wards in the borough of Bolton

- Bolton North East
- Bolton South and Walkden (part)
- Bolton West

Containing electoral wards in the borough of Bury

- Bury North
- Bury South (part)

Containing electoral wards in the city of Manchester

- Gorton and Denton (part)
- Blackley and Middleton South (part)
- Manchester Central (part)
- Manchester Rusholme
- Manchester Withington
- Wythenshawe and Sale East (part)

Containing electoral wards in the borough of Oldham

- Manchester Central (part)
- Oldham East and Saddleworth
- Oldham West, Chadderton and Royton

Containing electoral wards in the borough of Rochdale

- Blackley and Middleton South (part)
- Heywood and Middleton North
- Rochdale

Containing electoral wards in the city of Salford

- Bolton South and Walkden (part)
- Bury South (part)
- Salford
- Worsley and Eccles (part)

Containing electoral wards in the borough of Stockport

- Cheadle
- Hazel Grove
- Stockport

Containing electoral wards in the borough of Tameside

- Ashton-under-Lyne
- Gorton and Denton (part)
- Stalybridge and Hyde

Containing electoral wards in the borough of Trafford

- Altrincham and Sale West
- Stretford and Urmston
- Wythenshawe and Sale East (part)

Containing electoral wards in the borough of Wigan

- Leigh and Atherton
- Makerfield
- Wigan
- Worsley and Eccles (part)

=== 2010 ===
Under the fifth periodic review of Westminster constituencies, the Boundary Commission for England decided to reduce the number of seats in Greater Manchester from 28 to 27, leading to significant changes in the city of Salford, where the three constituencies of Eccles, Salford, and Worsley were abolished and replaced by the two constituencies of Salford and Eccles, and Worsley and Eccles South. Manchester, Blackley was replaced by Blackley and Broughton.

==== 1997 boundaries ====
Name (1997–2010)		Boundaries (1997–2010)
1. Altrincham and Sale West BC; 2. Ashton under Lyne BC; 3. Bolton North East BC; 4. Bolton South East BC; 5. Bolton West CC; 6. Bury North BC; 7. Bury South BC; 8. Cheadle BC; 9. Denton and Reddish BC; 10. Eccles BC; 11. Hazel Grove CC; 12. Heywood and Middleton CC; 13. Leigh CC; 14. Makerfield CC	15. Manchester, Blackley BC; 16. Manchester Central BC; 17. Manchester, Gorton BC; 18. Manchester, Withington BC; 19. Oldham East and Saddleworth CC; 20. Oldham West and Royton BC; 21. Rochdale CC; 22. Salford BC; 23. Stalybridge and Hyde CC; 24. Stockport BC; 25. Stretford and Urmston BC; 26. Wigan CC; 27. Worsley CC; 28. Wythenshawe and Sale East BC	Former parliamentary constituencies in Greater Manchester

==== 2010 boundaries ====
Name (2010–2024)		Boundaries (2010–2024)
1. Altrincham and Sale West BC; 2. Ashton-under-Lyne BC; 3. Blackley and Broughton BC; 4. Bolton North East BC; 5. Bolton South East BC; 6. Bolton West CC; 7. Bury North BC; 8. Bury South BC; 9. Cheadle BC; 10. Denton and Reddish BC; 11. Hazel Grove CC; 12. Heywood and Middleton CC; 13. Leigh CC; 14. Makerfield CC	15. Manchester Central BC; 16. Manchester, Gorton BC; 17. Manchester, Withington BC; 18. Oldham East and Saddleworth CC; 19. Oldham West and Royton BC; 20. Rochdale CC; 21. Salford and Eccles BC; 22. Stalybridge and Hyde CC; 23. Stockport BC; 24. Stretford and Urmston BC; 25. Wigan CC; 26. Worsley and Eccles South CC; 27. Wythenshawe and Sale East BC	Current parliamentary constituencies in Greater Manchester

== Results history ==
Primary data source: House of Commons research briefing - General election results from 1918 to 2019

=== 2024 ===
The number of votes cast for each political party who fielded candidates in constituencies comprising Greater Manchester in the 2024 general election were as follows:

Party	Votes	%	Change from 2019	Seats	Change from 2019
Labour	471,074	42.8%	▼5.1%	25	▲7
Reform	191,257	17.4%	▲11.9%	0	0
Conservative	173,735	15.8%	▼19.1%	0	▼9
Liberal Democrats	95,978	8.7%	▼0.1	2	▲2
Green	89,203	8.1%	▲5.7%	0	0
Others	79,496	7.2%	▲6.7%	0	0
Total	1,100,743	100.0		27	

=== 2019 ===
The number of votes cast for each political party who fielded candidates in constituencies comprising Greater Manchester in the 2019 general election were as follows:

Party	Votes	%	Change from 2017	Seats	Change from 2017
Labour	597,271	47.9%	▼9.0%	18	▼5
Conservative	435,651	34.9%	▲2.4%	9	▲5
Liberal Democrats	109,555	8.8%	▲2.7%	0	0
Brexit Party	68,462	5.5%	new	0	0
Green	29,642	2.4%	▲1.4%	0	0
Others	6,602	0.5%	▼3.0%	0	0
Total	1,247,183	100.0		27	

=== Percentage votes ===
Election year	1983	1987	1992	1997	2001	2005	2010	2015	2017	2019	2024
Labour	39.7	44.0	47.3	56.3	53.7	47.2	40.3	46.1	56.9	47.9	42.8
Reform^{1}	-	-	-	-	-	-	-	-	-	5.5	17.4
Conservative	36.2	35.9	35.5	24.1	24.3	23.7	27.3	26.4	32.5	34.9	15.8
Liberal Democrats^{2}	23.6	19.9	15.7	16.0	18.3	23.3	23.8	7.1	6.1	8.8	8.7
Green	-	*	*	*	*	*	0.6	3.5	1.0	2.4	8.1
UKIP	-	-	-	*	*	*	3.2	16.1	2.8	*	*
Other	0.5	0.1	1.6	3.5	3.7	5.8	4.8	0.8	0.7	0.5	7.2

^{1}As the Brexit Party in 2019
^{2}1983 and 1987 - SDP–Liberal Alliance

* Included in Other

=== Seats ===
Election year	1983	1987	1992	1997	2001	2005	2010	2015	2017	2019	2024
Labour	18	19	20	25	25	23	22	22	23	18	25
Liberal Democrats^{1}	1	1	1	1	2	4	3	0	0	0	2
Conservative	11	10	9	2	1	1	2	5	4	9	0
Total	30	30	30	28	28	28	27	27	27	27	27

^{1}1983 and 1987 - SDP–Liberal Alliance

=== Maps ===
1983

1987

1992

1997

2001

2005

2010

2015

2017

2019

2024

== Historical representation by party ==
A cell marked → (with a different colour background to the preceding cell) indicates that the previous MP continued to sit under a new party name.

=== 1983 to 2010 ===
Conservative Labour Liberal Liberal Democrats

Constituency	1983	1987	88	1992	95	96	1997	99	2001	2005	05
Altrincham and Sale / Altrincham and Sale W (1997)	Montgomery						Brady				
Ashton-under-Lyne	Sheldon								Heyes		
Bolton North East	Thurnham					→	Crausby				
Bolton South East	Young						Iddon				
Bolton West	Sackville						Kelly				
Bury North	Burt						Chaytor				
Bury South	Sumberg						Lewis				
Cheadle	Normanton	Day							Calton		Hunter
Denton and Reddish	Bennett									Gwynne	
Eccles	Carter-Jones	Lestor					Stewart				
Hazel Grove	Arnold						Stunell				
Heywood and Middleton	Callaghan						Dobbin				
Leigh	Cunliffe								Burnham		
Makerfield	McGuire	McCartney									
Manchester Blackley	Eastham						Stringer				
Manchester Central	Litherland						Lloyd				
Manchester Gorton	Kaufman										
Manchester Withington	Silvester	Bradley								Leech	
Manchester Wythenshawe / Wythenshawe and Sale E (97)	Morris						Goggins				
Oldham C and Royton / Oldham E and Saddleworth (97)	Lamond			Davies			Woolas				
Oldham West / Oldham West and Royton (1997)	Meacher										
Rochdale	Smith		→	Lynne			Fitzsimons			Rowen	
Salford East / Salford (1997)	Orme						Blears				
Stalybridge and Hyde	Pendry								Purnell		
Stretford / Stretford and Urmston (1997)	Lloyd						Hughes				
Stockport	Favell			Coffey							
Wigan	Stott							Turner			
Worsley	Lewis									Keeley	
Davyhulme	Churchill										
Littleborough and Saddleworth	Dickens				Davies						
Constituency	1983	1987	88	1992	95	96	1997	99	2001	2005	05

=== 2010 to present ===
Change UK Conservative Green Independent Independent Labour Labour Liberal Democrats Workers

Constituency	2010	11	12	14	2015	15	2017	17	19	2019	22	24	2024	25	26
Altrincham and Sale West	Brady												Rand		
Ashton-under-Lyne	Heyes				Rayner										
Blackley and Broughton / Blackley and Middleton South (2024)	Stringer														
Bolton North East	Crausby									Logan			Entwistle		
Bolton South East / Bolton South and Walkden (2024)	Qureshi														
Bolton West	Hilling				Green								Brickell		
Bury North	Nuttall						Frith			Daly			Frith		
Bury South	Lewis							→		Wakeford	→				
Cheadle	Hunter				Robinson								Morrison		
Denton and Reddish / Gorton and Denton (2024)	Gwynne													→	Spencer
Hazel Grove	Stunell				Wragg							→	Smart		
Heywood and Middleton / Heywood and Middleton North (2024)	Dobbin			McInnes						Clarkson			Blundell		
Leigh / Leigh and Atherton (2024)	Burnham						Platt			Grundy			Platt		
Makerfield	Fovargue												Simons		Burnham
Manchester Central	Lloyd		Powell												
Manchester Gorton / Manchester Rusholme (2024)	Kaufman						Khan								
Manchester Withington	Leech				Smith										
Oldham East and Saddleworth	Woolas	Abrahams													
Oldham W and Royton / Oldham W, Chadderton and Royton ('24)	Meacher					McMahon									
Rochdale	Danczuk					→	Lloyd					Galloway	Waugh		
Salford and Eccles / Salford (2024)	Blears				Long-Bailey										
Stalybridge and Hyde	Reynolds														
Stockport	Coffey								→	Mishra					
Stretford and Urmston	Green										Western				
Wigan	Nandy														
Worsley and Eccles South / Worsley and Eccles (2024)	Keeley												Wheeler		
Wythenshawe and Sale East	Goggins			Kane											
Constituency	2010	11	12	14	2015	15	2017	17	19	2019	22	24	2024	25	26

== See also ==
- Constituencies of the Parliament of the United Kingdom
- Parliamentary constituencies in North West England
