= List of MPs who lost their seat in the 2019 United Kingdom general election =

Incumbent MPs who lost their seats in the 2019 General Election

Party	Name	Constituency	Office held whilst in Parliament	Year elected	Defeated by	Party
Labour	Richard Burden	Birmingham Northfield	Shadow Minister for Roads & Road Safety (2013–2016)	1992	Gary Sambrook	Conservative
Labour	Helen Goodman	Bishop Auckland	Shadow Foreign Minister	2005	Dehenna Davison	Conservative
Labour	Gordon Marsden	Blackpool South	Shadow Minister for Higher Education, Further Education and Skills	1997	Scott Benton	Conservative
Labour	Dennis Skinner	Bolsover	Chairman of the National Executive Committee	1970	Mark Fletcher	Conservative
Labour	David Crausby	Bolton North East		1997	Mark Logan	Conservative
Labour	Madeleine Moon	Bridgend	President of the NATO Parliamentary Assembly (2018–2019)	2005	Jamie Wallis	Conservative
Labour	Julie Cooper	Burnley	Shadow Community Health Minister	2015	Antony Higginbotham	Conservative
Labour	James Frith	Bury North		2017	James Daly	Conservative
Labour	Susan Elan Jones	Clwyd South		2010	Simon Baynes	Conservative
Labour	Thelma Walker	Colne Valley		2017	Jason McCartney	Conservative
Labour	Laura Smith	Crewe and Nantwich	Shadow Minister of State for the Cabinet Office (2018)	2017	Kieran Mullan	Conservative
Labour	Hugh Gaffney	Coatbridge, Chryston and Bellshill		2017	Steven Bonnar	SNP
Labour	Jenny Chapman	Darlington	Shadow Brexit Minister	2010	Peter Gibson	Conservative
Labour	David Hanson	Delyn	Shadow Minister of State for Immigration (2011–2015)	1992	Rob Roberts	Conservative
Labour	Paula Sherriff	Dewsbury	Shadow Minister for Social Care and Mental Health	2015	Mark Eastwood	Conservative
Labour	Caroline Flint	Don Valley	Shadow Secretary of State for Energy and Climate Change (2011–2015)	1997	Nick Fletcher	Conservative
Labour	Martin Whitfield	East Lothian		2017	Kenny MacAskill	SNP
Labour	Vernon Coaker	Gedling	Shadow Secretary of State for Northern Ireland (2015–2016)	1997	Tom Randall	Conservative
Labour	Paul Sweeney	Glasgow North East	Shadow Minister for Scotland	2017	Anne McLaughlin	SNP
Labour	Melanie Onn	Great Grimsby	Shadow Minister for Housing (2017–2019)	2015	Lia Nici	Conservative
Labour	Liz McInnes	Heywood and Middleton	Shadow Foreign Office Minister	2014	Chris Clarkson	Conservative
Labour	Ruth George	High Peak		2017	Robert Largan	Conservative
Labour	Graham Jones	Hyndburn		2010	Sara Britcliffe	Conservative
Labour	Sandy Martin	Ipswich	Shadow Minister for Waste & Recycling	2017	Tom Hunt	Conservative
Labour	John Grogan	Keighley		2017	Robbie Moore	Conservative
Labour	Emma Dent Coad	Kensington		2017	Felicity Buchan	Conservative
Labour	Lesley Laird	Kirkcaldy and Cowdenbeath	Shadow Secretary of State for Scotland	2017	Neale Hanvey (Note: Suspended at time of election)	SNP
Labour	Joanne Platt	Leigh	Shadow Cabinet Office Minister	2017	James Grundy	Conservative
Labour	Karen Lee	Lincoln	Shadow Minister for Fire and Rescue Services	2017	Karl McCartney	Conservative
Labour	Danielle Rowley	Midlothian	Shadow Minister for Climate Justice and Green Jobs	2017	Owen Thompson	SNP
Labour	Laura Pidcock	North West Durham	Shadow Secretary of State for Employment Rights	2017	Richard Holden	Conservative
Labour	Lisa Forbes	Peterborough		2019	Paul Bristow	Conservative
Labour	Anna Turley	Redcar	Chair of the Co-operative Party	2015	Jacob Young	Conservative
Labour	Gerard Killen	Rutherglen and Hamilton West		2017	Margaret Ferrier	SNP
Labour	Nic Dakin	Scunthorpe	Shadow Minister for Schools (2015–2016)	2010	Holly Mumby-Croft	Conservative
Labour	Phil Wilson	Sedgefield		2007	Paul Howell	Conservative
Labour	Paul Williams	Stockton South		2017	Matt Vickers	Conservative
Labour	Gareth Snell	Stoke-on-Trent Central		2017	Jo Gideon	Conservative
Labour	Ruth Smeeth	Stoke-on-Trent North		2015	Jonathan Gullis	Conservative
Labour	David Drew	Stroud	Shadow Farming and Rural Communities Minister	2017	Siobhan Baillie	Conservative
Labour	Chris Ruane	Vale of Clwyd		2017	James Davies	Conservative
Labour	Mary Creagh	Wakefield	Chair of the Environmental Audit Select Committee	2005	Imran Ahmad Khan	Conservative
Labour	Faisal Rashid	Warrington South		2017	Andy Carter	Conservative
Labour	Emma Reynolds	Wolverhampton North East	Shadow Secretary of State for Communities and Local Government (2015)	2010	Jane Stevenson	Conservative
Labour	Eleanor Smith	Wolverhampton South West		2017	Stuart Anderson	Conservative
Labour	Sue Hayman	Workington	Shadow Secretary of State for Environment, Food and Rural Affairs (2017–2019)	2015	Mark Jenkinson	Conservative
Conservative	Kirstene Hair	Angus		2017	Dave Doogan	SNP
Conservative	Paul Masterton	East Renfrewshire		2017	Kirsten Oswald	SNP
Conservative	Colin Clark	Gordon	Parliamentary Under-Secretary of State for Scotland	2017	Richard Thomson	SNP
Conservative	Luke Graham	Ochil and South Perthshire		2017	John Nicolson	SNP
Conservative	Zac Goldsmith	Richmond Park	Minister of State for Environment and International Development	2017	Sarah Olney	Liberal Democrats
Conservative	Anne Main	St Albans		2005	Daisy Cooper	Liberal Democrats
Conservative	Stephen Kerr	Stirling		2017	Alyn Smith	SNP
Independent	Dominic Grieve	Beaconsfield	Chair of the Intelligence and Security Committee	1997	Joy Morrissey	Conservative
Independent	Roger Godsiff	Birmingham Hall Green		1992	Tahir Ali	Labour
Independent	Ivan Lewis	Bury South	Shadow Secretary of State for Northern Ireland (2013–2015)	1997	Christian Wakeford	Conservative
Independent	Chris Williamson	Derby North	Shadow Minister for Fire and Emergency Services (2017–2018)	2017	Amanda Solloway	Conservative
Independent	Anne Milton	Guildford	Minister of State for Skills and Apprenticeships (2017–2019)	2005	Angela Richardson	Conservative
Independent	Gavin Shuker	Luton South		2010	Rachel Hopkins	Labour
Independent	David Gauke	South West Hertfordshire	Secretary of State for Justice (2018–2019)	2005	Gagan Mohindra	Conservative
Liberal Democrats	Philip Lee	Bracknell, contesting Wokingham	Liberal Democrat Spokesperson for Justice	2010	John Redwood	Conservative hold
Liberal Democrats	Jane Dodds	Brecon and Radnorshire	Liberal Democrat Spokesperson for Food and Rural Affairs & Leader of the Welsh Liberal Democrats	2019	Fay Jones	Conservative
Liberal Democrats	Tom Brake	Carshalton and Wallington	Liberal Democrat Spokesman for the Duchy of Lancaster	1997	Elliot Colburn	Conservative
Liberal Democrats	Stephen Lloyd	Eastbourne	Liberal Democrat Spokesperson for Work and Pensions (2017–2018)	2017	Caroline Ansell	Conservative
Liberal Democrats	Jo Swinson	East Dunbartonshire	Leader of the Liberal Democrats	2017	Amy Callaghan	SNP
Liberal Democrats	Sam Gyimah	East Surrey, contesting Kensington	Liberal Democrat Spokesperson for Business, Energy and Industrial Strategy	2010	see Labour loss to Felicity Buchan above	
Liberal Democrats	Antoinette Sandbach	Eddisbury		2015	Edward Timpson	Conservative
Liberal Democrats	Luciana Berger	Liverpool Wavertree, contesting Finchley and Golders Green	Liberal Democrat Spokesperson for Health, Wellbeing and Social Care	2015	Mike Freer	Conservative hold
Liberal Democrats	Angela Smith	Penistone and Stocksbridge, contesting Altrincham and Sale West	Liberal Democrat Spokesperson for International Development (2019)	2005	Miriam Cates	Conservative hold
Liberal Democrats	Chuka Umunna	Streatham, contesting Cities of London and Westminster	Liberal Democrat Spokesman for Foreign and Commonwealth Affairs	2010	Nickie Aiken	Conservative hold
Liberal Democrats	Sarah Wollaston	Totnes	Chair of the Liaison Committee and Heath Select Committee	2010	Anthony Mangnall	Conservative
The Independent Group	Anna Soubry	Broxtowe	Leader of the Independent Group for Change	2010	Darren Henry	Conservative
The Independent Group	Mike Gapes	Ilford South		1992	Sam Tarry	Labour
The Independent Group	Chris Leslie	Nottingham East	Shadow Chancellor of the Exchequer (2015)	2010	Nadia Whittome	Labour
DUP	Nigel Dodds	Belfast North	Leader of the Democratic Unionist Party in the House of Commons	2001	John Finucane	Sinn Féin
DUP	Emma Little-Pengelly	Belfast South		2017	Claire Hanna	SDLP
Birkenhead Social Justice	Frank Field	Birkenhead	Chair of the Work and Pensions Select Committee (2015–2019)	1979	Mick Whitley	Labour
Sinn Féin	Elisha McCallion	Foyle		2017	Colum Eastwood	SDLP
SNP	Stephen Gethins	North East Fife	SNP Westminster Spokesperson for International Affairs and Europe	2015	Wendy Chamberlain	Liberal Democrats

== Open (vacated) seats won by another party's candidate (or an independent candidate) ==
Party	Candidate	Incumbent retiring from the House	Constituency	Defeated by	Party
Conservative	Douglas Lumsden	Ross Thomson	Aberdeen South	Stephen Flynn	SNP
Labour	Natalie Fleet	Gloria De Piero	Ashfield	Lee Anderson	Conservative
Conservative	Martin Dowey	Bill Grant	Ayr, Carrick and Cumnock	Allan Dorans	SNP
Independent	Chris Altree (Labour)	John Woodcock (Note: Elected as Labour)	Barrow and Furness	Simon Fell	Conservative
Labour	Keir Morrison	John Mann	Bassetlaw	Brendan Clarke-Smith	Conservative
Labour	Susan Dungworth	Ronnie Campbell	Blyth Valley	Ian Levy	Conservative
Independent	Lucy Burke (Labour)	Ivan Lewis (Note: Elected as Labour)	Bury South	Christian Wakeford	Conservative
Independent	Melanie Dudley (Labour)	Ian Austin (Note: Elected as Labour)	Dudley North	Marco Longhi	Conservative
Independent	—N/a (Note: Hermon was an Ulster Unionist Party MP between 2001 and February 2010, and stood as an "independent unionist" candidate in the 2010, 2015, and 2017 elections. The UUP candidate was Alan Chambers, himself a former independent unionist)	Sylvia Hermon	North Down	Stephen Farry	Alliance
Labour	Carl Greatbatch	Paul Farrelly	Newcastle-under-Lyme	Aaron Bell	Conservative
Liberal Democrats	Karen Ward	Norman Lamb	North Norfolk	Duncan Baker	Conservative
Labour	Francyne Johnson	Angela Smith	Penistone and Stocksbridge	Miriam Cates	Conservative
Independent	Will Sweet (Conservative)	Justine Greening (Note: Elected as Conservative)	Putney	Fleur Anderson	Labour
Labour	Sophie Wilson	Kevin Barron	Rother Valley	Alexander Stafford	Conservative
Labour	Ibrahim Dogus	Tom Watson	West Bromwich East	Nicola Richards	Conservative
Labour	James Cunningham	Adrian Bailey	West Bromwich West	Shaun Bailey	Conservative
Labour	Mary Wimbury	Ian Lucas	Wrexham	Sarah Atherton	Conservative
Labour	Mary Roberts	Albert Owen	Ynys Môn	Virginia Crosbie	Conservative
