= Parliamentary constituencies in North West England =

The region of North West England is divided into 73 parliamentary constituencies, of which 34 are borough constituencies and 39 are county constituencies. Following the 2024 general election, 65 were represented by Labour MPs, 3 by Conservative MPs, 3 by Liberal Democrat MPs, 1 by the Speaker, and 1 by an independent MP. Reform UK gained 1 seat from Labour in the 2025 Runcorn and Helsby by-election. The Green Party gained another also from Labour in the 2026 Gorton and Denton by-election.

== Constituencies ==
† Conservative ‡ Labour ¤ Liberal Democrat ♣ Green Party ♠ Independent # Reform UK ★ Speaker ∞ Workers

Constituency (Note: BC denotes borough constituency, CC denotes county constituency.)	Electorate	Majority (Note: The majority is the number of votes the winning candidate receives more than their nearest rival.)	Member of Parliament	Nearest opposition	County	Constituency map
Altrincham and Sale West BC	74,026	4,174	Connor Rand‡	Oliver Carroll†	Greater Manchester	
Ashton-under-Lyne BC	71,002	6,791	Angela Rayner‡	Robert Barrowcliffe#	Greater Manchester	
Barrow and Furness CC	74,980	5,324	Michelle Scrogham‡	Simon Fell†	Cumbria	
Birkenhead BC	78,091	13,798	Alison McGovern‡	Jo Bird♣	Merseyside	
Blackburn BC	73,259	132	Adnan Hussain♠	Kate Hollern‡	Lancashire	
Blackley and Middleton South BC	72,097	10,220	Graham Stringer‡	Alison Devine#	Greater Manchester	
Blackpool North and Fleetwood BC	73,339	4,647	Lorraine Beavers‡	Paul Maynard†	Lancashire	
Blackpool South BC	77,460	6,868	Chris Webb‡	Mark Butcher#	Lancashire	
Bolton North East BC	80,011	6,653	Kirith Entwistle‡	Adele Warren†	Greater Manchester	
Bolton South and Walkden BC	79,622	6,743	Yasmin Qureshi‡	Julie Pattison#	Greater Manchester	
Bolton West CC	74,933	4,945	Phil Brickell‡	Chris Green†	Greater Manchester	
Bootle BC	73,037	21,983	Peter Dowd‡	Darren Burns#	Merseyside	
Burnley CC	74,951	3,420	Oliver Ryan‡	Gordon Birtwistle¤	Lancashire	
Bury North BC	77,703	6,944	James Frith‡	James Daly†	Greater Manchester	
Bury South BC	75,339	9,361	Christian Wakeford‡	Arnie Saunders†	Greater Manchester	
Carlisle	77,863	5,200	Julie Minns‡	John Stevenson†	Cumbria	
Cheadle BC	74,385	12,235	Tom Morrison¤	Mary Robinson†	Greater Manchester	
Chester North and Neston CC	70,215	11,870	Samantha Dixon‡	Simon Eardley†	Cheshire	
Chester South and Eddisbury CC	74,284	3,057	Aphra Brandreth†	Angeliki Stogia‡	Cheshire	
Chorley CC	74,800	20,575	Lindsay Hoyle★	Mark Tebbutt♣	Lancashire	
Congleton CC	72,914	3,387	Sarah Russell‡	Fiona Bruce†	Cheshire	
Crewe and Nantwich CC	78,423	9,727	Connor Naismith‡	Ben Fletcher†	Cheshire	
Ellesmere Port and Bromborough CC	70,799	16,908	Justin Madders‡	Michael Aldred#	Cheshire / Merseyside	
Fylde CC	77,100	561	Andrew Snowden†	Tom Calver‡	Lancashire	
Gorton and Denton CC	78,125	4,402	Hannah Spencer♣	Matt Goodwin#	Greater Manchester	
Hazel Grove CC	72,846	6,500	Lisa Smart¤	Claire Vibert‡	Greater Manchester	
Heywood and Middleton North CC	74,786	6,082	Elsie Blundell‡	Steve Potter#	Greater Manchester	
Hyndburn BC	67,147	1,687	Sarah Smith‡	Sara Britcliffe†	Lancashire	
Knowsley BC	71,964	18,319	Anneliese Midgley‡	Alexander Hitchmough#	Merseyside	
Lancaster and Wyre CC	74,760	9,253	Cat Smith‡	Peter Cartridge†	Lancashire	
Leigh and Atherton BC	79,978	8,881	Jo Platt‡	George Woodward#	Greater Manchester	
Liverpool Garston BC	69,282	20,104	Maria Eagle‡	Kiera Hubbard#	Merseyside	
Liverpool Riverside BC	71,380	14,793	Kim Johnson‡	Chris Coughlan♣	Merseyside	
Liverpool Walton BC	69,317	20,245	Dan Carden‡	Joe Doran#	Merseyside	
Liverpool Wavertree BC	70,581	16,304	Paula Barker‡	Tom Crone♣	Merseyside	
Liverpool West Derby BC	69,934	20,423	Ian Byrne‡	Jack Boyd#	Merseyside	
Macclesfield CC	76,416	9,120	Tim Roca‡	David Rutley†	Cheshire	
Makerfield CC	76,641	5,399	Andy Burnham‡	Robert Kenyon#	Greater Manchester	
Manchester Central BC	85,049	13,797	Lucy Powell‡	Ekua Bayunu♣	Greater Manchester	
Manchester Rusholme BC	72,604	8,235	Afzal Khan‡	Thirza Asanga-Rae♣	Greater Manchester	
Manchester Withington BC	70,549	13,982	Jeff Smith‡	Sam Easterby-Smith♣	Greater Manchester	
Mid Cheshire CC	70,384	8,927	Andrew Cooper‡	Charles Fifield†	Cheshire	
Morecambe and Lunesdale CC	76,424	5,815	Lizzi Collinge‡	David Morris†	Cumbria / Lancashire	
Oldham East and Saddleworth CC	72,760	6,357	Debbie Abrahams‡	Jacob Barden#	Greater Manchester	
Oldham West, Chadderton and Royton CC	75,346	4,976	Jim McMahon‡	Zaffar Iqbal♠	Greater Manchester	
Pendle and Clitheroe CC	78,796	902	Jonathan Hinder‡	Andrew Stephenson†	Lancashire	
Penrith and Solway	77,935	5,257	Markus Campbell-Savours‡	Mark Jenkinson†	Cumbria	
Preston BC	77,400	5,291	Mark Hendrick‡	Michael Lavalette♠	Lancashire	
Ribble Valley CC	80,484	856	Maya Ellis‡	Nigel Evans†	Lancashire	
Rochdale CC	71,264	1,440	Paul Waugh‡	George Galloway∞	Greater Manchester	
Rossendale and Darwen CC	74,440	5,628	Andy MacNae‡	Jake Berry†	Lancashire	
Runcorn and Helsby CC	71,955	6	Sarah Pochin#	Karen Shore‡	Cheshire	
Salford BC	83,633	15,101	Rebecca Long-Bailey‡	Keith Whalley#	Greater Manchester	
Sefton Central CC	74,282	18,282	Bill Esterson‡	Marcus Bleasdale†	Merseyside	
South Ribble CC	73,420	6,501	Paul Foster‡	Katherine Fletcher†	Lancashire	
Southport CC	73,641	5,789	Patrick Hurley‡	Damien Moore†	Lancashire / Merseyside	
St Helens North CC	75,483	12,169	David Baines‡	Malcolm Webster#	Merseyside	
St Helens South and Whiston BC	71,569	11,945	Marie Rimmer‡	Raymond Peters#	Merseyside	
Stalybridge and Hyde CC	72,265	8,539	Jonathan Reynolds‡	Barbara Kaya#	Greater Manchester	
Stockport BC	76,625	15,270	Navendu Mishra‡	Lynn Schofield#	Greater Manchester	
Stretford and Urmston BC	75,153	16,150	Andrew Western‡	Mark Cornes†	Greater Manchester	
Tatton CC	74,237	1,136	Esther McVey†	Ryan Jude‡	Cheshire	
Wallasey BC	74,082	17,996	Angela Eagle‡	David Burgess-Joyce#	Merseyside	
Warrington North CC	70,601	9,190	Charlotte Nichols‡	Trevor Nicholls#	Cheshire	
Warrington South BC	78,399	11,340	Sarah Hall‡	Andy Carter†	Cheshire	
West Lancashire CC	74,083	13,625	Ashley Dalton‡	Mike Prendergast†	Lancashire	
Westmorland and Lonsdale CC	72,029	21,472	Tim Farron¤	Matty Jackman†	Cumbria	
Whitehaven and Workington CC	73,198	13,286	Josh MacAlister‡	David Surtees#	Cumbria	A medium constituency in the west of the county.
Widnes and Halewood CC	70,161	16,425	Derek Twigg‡	Jake Fraser#	Cheshire / Merseyside	
Wigan CC	77,538	9,549	Lisa Nandy‡	Andy Dawber#	Greater Manchester	
Wirral West CC	72,838	9,998	Matthew Patrick‡	Jenny Johnson†	Merseyside	
Worsley and Eccles CC	78,643	11,091	Michael Wheeler‡	Craig Birtwistle#	Greater Manchester	
Wythenshawe and Sale East BC	77,765	14,610	Mike Kane‡	Julie Fousert#	Greater Manchester	

== 2024 boundary changes ==
See 2023 Periodic Review of Westminster constituencies for further details.

Following the abandonment of the Sixth Periodic Review (the 2018 review), the Boundary Commission for England formally launched the 2023 Review on 5 January 2021. The Commission calculated that the number of seats to be allocated to the North West region would be reduced by two, from 75 to 73. Initial proposals were published on 8 June and, following two periods of public consultation, revised proposals were published on 8 November 2022. The final proposals were published on 28 June 2023.

Under the proposals, the following constituencies for the region came into effect at the 2024 general election:

Constituency	Electorate	Ceremonial county	Local authority
Altrincham and Sale West BC	73,934	Greater Manchester	Trafford
Ashton-under-Lyne BC	72,278	Greater Manchester	Tameside
Barrow and Furness CC	76,603	Cumbria	Cumberland / Westmorland and Furness
Birkenhead BC	76,271	Merseyside	Wirral
Blackburn BC	70,586	Lancashire	Blackburn with Darwen
Blackley and Middleton South BC	71,735	Greater Manchester	Manchester / Rochdale
Blackpool North and Fleetwood BC	75,396	Lancashire	Blackpool / Wyre
Blackpool South BC	76,071	Lancashire	Blackpool
Bolton North East BC	77,020	Greater Manchester	Bolton
Bolton South and Walkden BC	75,716	Greater Manchester	Bolton / Salford
Bolton West BC	72,125	Greater Manchester	Bolton
Bootle BC	75,194	Merseyside	Sefton
Burnley CC	75,436	Lancashire	Burnley / Pendle
Bury North BC	77,009	Greater Manchester	Bury
Bury South BC	74,598	Greater Manchester	Bury / Salford
Carlisle CC	75,868	Cumbria	Cumberland
Cheadle BC	73,775	Greater Manchester	Stockport
Chester North and Neston CC	72,327	Cheshire	Cheshire West and Chester
Chester South and Eddisbury CC	71,975	Cheshire	Cheshire East / Cheshire West and Chester
Chorley CC	74,568	Lancashire	Chorley / South Ribble
Congleton CC	69,836	Cheshire	Cheshire East
Crewe and Nantwich CC	76,236	Cheshire	Cheshire East
Ellesmere Port and Bromborough BC	71,027	Cheshire / Merseyside	Cheshire West and Chester / Wirral
Fylde CC	75,114	Lancashire	Fylde / Wyre
Gorton and Denton BC	74,306	Greater Manchester	Manchester / Tameside
Hazel Grove CC	72,941	Greater Manchester	Stockport
Heywood and Middleton North CC	73,306	Greater Manchester	Rochdale
Hyndburn CC	69,971	Lancashire	Hyndburn / Ribble Valley
Knowsley BC	71,228	Merseyside	Knowsley
Lancaster and Wyre CC	74,992	Lancashire	Lancaster / Wyre
Leigh and Atherton BC	76,363	Greater Manchester	Wigan
Liverpool Garston BC	70,372	Merseyside	Liverpool
Liverpool Riverside BC	70,157	Merseyside	Liverpool
Liverpool Walton BC	75,926	Merseyside	Liverpool / Sefton
Liverpool Wavertree BC	71,076	Merseyside	Liverpool
Liverpool West Derby BC	70,730	Merseyside	Knowsley / Liverpool
Macclesfield CC	75,881	Cheshire	Cheshire East
Makerfield BC	76,517	Greater Manchester	Wigan
Manchester Central BC	75,311	Greater Manchester	Manchester / Oldham
Manchester Rusholme BC	70,692	Greater Manchester	Manchester
Manchester Withington BC	71,614	Greater Manchester	Manchester
Mid Cheshire CC	69,775	Cheshire	Cheshire East / Cheshire West and Chester
Morecambe and Lunesdale CC	76,040	Cumbria / Lancashire	Lancaster / Westmorland and Furness
Oldham East and Saddleworth CC	72,997	Greater Manchester	Oldham
Oldham West, Chadderton and Royton BC	74,183	Greater Manchester	Oldham
Pendle and Clitheroe CC	76,941	Lancashire	Pendle / Ribble Valley
Penrith and Solway CC	76,720	Cumbria	Cumberland / Westmorland and Furness
Preston BC	72,946	Lancashire	Preston
Ribble Valley CC	75,993	Lancashire	Preston / Ribble Valley / South Ribble
Rochdale CC	71,697	Greater Manchester	Rochdale
Rossendale and Darwen CC	74,593	Lancashire	Blackburn with Darwen / Rossendale
Runcorn and Helsby CC	70,950	Cheshire	Cheshire West and Chester / Halton
Salford BC	72,169	Greater Manchester	Salford
Sefton Central CC	74,746	Merseyside	Sefton
South Ribble CC	72,029	Lancashire	South Ribble
Southport CC	74,168	Lancashire / Merseyside	Sefton / West Lancashire
St Helens North CC	76,082	Merseyside	St Helens
St Helens South and Whiston BC	70,302	Merseyside	Knowsley / St Helens
Stalybridge and Hyde BC	73,028	Greater Manchester	Tameside
Stockport BC	74,769	Greater Manchester	Stockport
Stretford and Urmston BC	73,212	Greater Manchester	Trafford
Tatton CC	75,538	Cheshire	Cheshire East / Cheshire West and Chester / Warrington
Wallasey BC	73,054	Merseyside	Wirral
Warrington North CC	72,350	Cheshire	Warrington
Warrington South BC	76,639	Cheshire	Warrington
West Lancashire CC	73,652	Lancashire	West Lancashire
Westmorland and Lonsdale CC	72,322	Cumbria	Westmorland and Furness
Whitehaven and Workington CC	73,385	Cumbria	Cumberland
Widnes and Halewood CC	70,865	Cheshire / Merseyside	Halton / Knowsley
Wigan CC	75,607	Greater Manchester	Wigan
Wirral West CC	72,126	Merseyside	Wirral
Worsley and Eccles CC	76,915	Greater Manchester	Salford / Wigan
Wythenshawe and Sale East BC	76,971	Greater Manchester	Manchester / Trafford

== 2024 results ==
The number of votes cast for each political party who fielded candidates in constituencies comprising the North West region in the 2024 general election were as follows:

Party	Votes	%	Change from 2019	Seats	Change from 2019 (actual)	Change from 2019 (notional)
Labour	1,361,196	44.0	▼2.5	65	▲24	▲24
Conservative	581,099	18.8	▼18.7	3	▼29	▼28
Reform UK	512,115	16.6	▲12.7	0	0	0
Liberal Democrats	242,662	7.8	Steady	3	▲2	▲3
Green	217,092	7.0	▲4.6	0	0	0
Others	178,298	5.8	▲4.0	2	▲1	▲1
Total	3,092,462	100.0		73	▼2	

== Results history ==
Primary data source: House of Commons research briefing - General election results from 1918 to 2019 (2024 as above)

=== Percentage votes ===
North West votes %

Key:

- CON - Conservative Party, including National Liberal Party up to 1966
- LAB - Labour Party, including Labour and Co-operative Party (2019 & 2024 - includes the Speaker)
- LIB - Liberal Party up to 1979; SDP-Liberal Alliance 1983 & 1987; Liberal Democrats from 1992
- UKIP - UK Independence Party 2010 to 2017 (included in Other up to 2005 and from 2019)
- REF - Reform UK (Brexit Party in 2019)
- GRN - Green Party of England and Wales (included in Other up to 2005)

=== Seats ===
North West seats

Key:

- CON - Conservative Party, including National Liberal Party up to 1966
- LAB - Labour Party, including Labour and Co-operative Party (2019 & 2024 - includes the Speaker, Lindsay Hoyle)
- LIB - Liberal Party up to 1979; SDP-Liberal Alliance 1983 & 1987; Liberal Democrats from 1992
- OTH - 1997 - Independent (Martin Bell); 2019 & 2024 - Speaker (Lyndsay Hoyle); 2024 - Independent (Adnan Hussain)

== See also ==
- Constituencies of the Parliament of the United Kingdom
- Parliamentary constituencies in Cheshire
- Parliamentary constituencies in Cumbria
- Parliamentary constituencies in Greater Manchester
- Parliamentary constituencies in Lancashire
- Parliamentary constituencies in Merseyside
