= Down Syndrome Act 2022 =

UK parliament act

- Act of Parliament
- Parliament of the United Kingdom
- Long title: An Act to make provision about meeting the needs of persons with Down syndrome; and for connected purposes.
- Citation: 2022 c. 18
- Introduced by: Liam Fox MP (Commons); Baroness Hollins (Lords)

Dates
- Royal assent: 28 April 2022

Status: Current legislation

History of passage through Parliament

Text of statute as originally enacted

Text of the Down Syndrome Act 2022 as in force today (including any amendments) within the United Kingdom, from legislation.gov.uk.

The Down Syndrome Act 2022 (c. 18) is an act of Parliament introduced as a private member's bill and sponsored by Conservative MP Liam Fox. It was described as "world leading" by MP Ian Paisley Jr and is intended to make legal provisions for people living with Down's syndrome. It was introduced by Baroness Hollins in the House of Lords.

== Background ==
In the United Kingdom, it is estimated that there are 40,000 people living with the condition.

The bill recognises people with Down syndrome as a specific minority group, and ensures their specific social care needs are met. It is the first such legislation in the world.

== Support ==
The bill was supported by the Conservative Disability Group, Down Syndrome Policy Group and actor Tommy Jessop.

The bill had the following cross-party co-sponsors in the House of Commons: Ben Lake, Ian Paisley, Lisa Cameron, Mark Logan, Nick Fletcher, Layla Moran, Darren Jones, James Daly, Flick Drummond and Elliot Colburn.

== Criticism ==
Critics of the bill said that it used a medical rather than a needs-based approach to people's needs, and discriminated against people with learning disabilities caused by other conditions or with no specific diagnosis, who had similar or greater needs to those of people with Down Syndrome. There appeared to have been little consultation with organisations such as the Down Syndrome Association, and little was known about the newly-formed National Down Syndrome Policy Group which was supporting the bill.

== Passage ==
On 26 November 2021, it was debated at second reading. On 22 March 2022, an event was held at Parliament to celebrate the government announcing their support for the bill. The act received royal assent on 28 April 2022.
