= Peter Thurnham =

British politician

Member of Parliament for Bolton North East
- In office 9 June 1983 – 8 April 1997
- Preceded by: Constituency established
- Succeeded by: David Crausby

Personal details
- Born: Peter Giles Thurnham; 21 August 1938 Staines, Middlesex, England
- Died: 10 May 2008 (aged 69) Bentham, North Yorkshire, England
- Party: Liberal Democrats (after October 1996)
- Other political affiliations: Independent (February–October 1996); Conservative (before 1996)
- Spouses: Sarah Stroude (m. 1963; div. 2004) Carole Emery (m. 2008)
- Children: 5
- Education: Peterhouse, Cambridge; Cranfield Institute of Technology; Harvard Business School

Peter Giles Thurnham (21 August 1938 – 10 May 2008) was a British politician. He was Member of Parliament for Bolton North East from 1983 to 1997, originally as a Conservative before resigning to become an independent in February 1996 and then a Liberal Democrat in October 1996.

== Biography ==
=== Early life ===
Thurnham was born in Staines, Middlesex on 21 August 1938. His father was a tea planter in India, where he worked for Brooke Bond, and his mother was a physiotherapist. Thurnham spent much of his early life in southern India, before being educated at Eversley Preparatory School and Oundle School. He won a scholarship to read engineering at Peterhouse, Cambridge, and received an advanced diploma in engineering from Cranfield Institute of Technology in 1967, and then an MBA from Harvard Business School in 1969.

=== Career ===
Thurnham became a design engineer at NEI Parsons in Newcastle until 1966, and then a director at British Steam Specialties until 1972. He married his first wife in 1963, he moved to Leicester in 1967 and succeeded Sydney Wathes as MD of Wathes ltd., an established refrigeration and air conditioning company, which he grew to become the Wathes group of companies and later WR Group Holdings.

He became a member of South Lakeland Council in 1982, and was elected as Member of Parliament in the new constituency of Bolton North East at the 1983 general election, defeating the Labour candidate Ann Taylor who had until the election represented Bolton West. He lived in Kendal while he was an MP, with his wife taking charge of his company. He was noted for his very strong support for the Abortion Act 1967 and for embryo research, and was a founder member of the Progress campaign group which promotes IVF. He became Parliamentary Private Secretary to Secretary of State for Employment Norman Fowler from 1987 to 1990, and was then PPS to both Eric Forth and Robert Jackson in 1991 to 1992, and finally to Secretary of State for the Environment Michael Howard (his contemporary at Peterhouse) from 1992 to 1993. He never secured ministerial office, but became a party whip.

Bolton North East was a highly marginal seat, which Thurnham held by a wafer thin majority of 813 at the 1987 general election, reduced even further to only 185 at the 1992 general election, and subsequent boundary changes made his position worse. He first indicated that he would stand down at the next election, but instead put his name forward for the safer seat of Westmorland and Lonsdale. Thurnham was not interviewed, and Tim Collins - formerly an aide to John Major - was selected as the Conservative candidate instead.

Thurnham resigned the Conservative party whip in February 1996, reducing John Major's majority in Parliament to two. At the time, Thurnham indicated that this was because of his dismay at the Scott Report and the Nolan Report, but subsequently chose to cross the floor to join the Liberal Democrats in October 1996. He did not contest the seat at the 1997 general election.

After leaving the House of Commons, he was chairman of WR Group Holdings. He also ran a 200-acre (0.81 km^{2}) farm.

=== Family ===
He had a son and three daughters with his first wife, and they also adopted a son with cerebral palsy. They were divorced in 2004. He died of pancreatic cancer at home in Bentham, North Yorkshire on 10 May 2008, aged 69, the day after he married his second wife, Carole Emery.

Parliament of the United Kingdom
| New constituency | Member of Parliament for Bolton North East; 1983–1997 | Succeeded by David Crausby |
