= David Nuttall =

British politician (born 1962)

Member of Parliament for Bury North
- In office 6 May 2010 – 3 May 2017
- Preceded by: David Chaytor
- Succeeded by: James Frith

Personal details
- Born: 25 March 1962 (age 64) Sheffield, West Riding of Yorkshire, England
- Party: Conservative
- Spouse: Susan
- Education: University of London
- Occupation: Notary public
- Website: davidnuttall.info

David Taylor Nuttall (born 25 March 1962) is a former British Conservative Party politician. He is a former Member of Parliament (MP) for Bury North, having won his seat in the House of Commons at the 2010 general election. He lost his seat to Labour's James Frith at the 2017 general election.

== Early life ==
David Taylor Nuttall was born in Sheffield and educated at Aston Comprehensive School in Rotherham. He left school at 18 and became a trainee legal executive in a firm of solicitors in Sheffield. He qualified as a fellow of the Institute of Legal Executives, and obtained a law degree by correspondence from the University of London. He was admitted as a solicitor in December 1990 and became a partner in his firm, rising to senior partner in 1998. He became a notary public in November 1998.

== Political career ==
David Nuttall joined the Conservative Party in 1980 and, after contesting a number of local government elections, spent four years as a councillor on Rotherham Borough Council for the Broom ward and, later, two years representing the Wales Ward. He unsuccessfully contested the following parliamentary constituencies:

- Sheffield Hillsborough in the 1997 General Election
- Morecambe and Lunesdale in the 2001 General Election
- Bury North in the 2005 General Election

He contested the Bury North seat again in the 2010 election and was successful in overturning the majority of Labour incumbent David Chaytor, winning by a margin of 2,243 (5.0%). He held the seat in the 2015 General Election with a reduced majority of 378 over local councillor James Frith of Labour. In the 2017 General Election, Nuttall lost the seat to Frith despite an increase in his vote share. His 378 majority was overturned and became a 4,375 majority for Labour.

Nuttall lives with his wife, Susan, in Tottington, Lancashire.

During the 2015 general election campaign, Nuttall was helped by the pro-hunting group Vote-OK members with leafleting, putting up posters and telephone canvassing.

== Electoral Commission and police investigation ==
In March 2017, the Electoral Commission fined the Conservative party £70,000. During the 2015 general election coaches of activists were transported to marginal constituencies including Bury North to campaign alongside or in close proximity to local campaigners. The inclusion in the Party return of what in the commission's view should have been reported as candidate spending meant that there was a realistic prospect that this enabled its candidates to gain a financial advantage over opponents. Nuttall was investigated by Greater Manchester Police (GMP) over whether he breached election spending rules. GMP subsequently confirmed that they had passed a file to the Crown Prosecution Service having received an allegation of electoral fraud in relation to the 2015 general election. The CPS subsequently confirmed that no action was to be taken, either in respect of Bury North or indeed any of the other constituencies which had been the subject of these allegations.

== Views ==
=== Poverty ===
Nuttall made his maiden speech on 10 June 2010 during a debate on "Tackling Poverty in the UK". In his speech he said: "I intend to be a strong and independent advocate for my constituents". Nuttall's first question in the House of Commons attracted some local comment when, in the week that cuts in spending and public sector job cuts were announced, Nuttall chose to express regret over the freezing of the spending on the civil list and implications for the Queen's diamond jubilee. The Bury Times carried several letters protesting his stance. In December 2016 he was criticised for implying that those who receive unemployment benefits are 'scared of getting a job'. His response was in opposition to the SNP who had been pushing against benefit sanctions, a controversial punishment for those deemed not to be searching for work hard enough in line with government recommendations. Benefit sanctions can last up to 3 years and leave the claimant with no legitimate source of income whatsoever for that period.

=== Law and order ===
Nuttall is rated as one of the Conservatives' most rebellious MPs. In 2013 Nuttall was one of four MPs who camped outside Parliament in a move to facilitate parliamentary debate on what they called an "Alternative Queen's Speech"—an attempt to show what a future Conservative government might deliver. Some 42 policies were listed including reintroduction of the death penalty and conscription, privatising the BBC, banning the burka in public places and preparation to leave the European Union.

=== Women and equality ===
In 2014 Nuttall, along with six other Conservative Party MPs, voted against the Equal Pay (Transparency) Bill which would require all companies with more than 250 employees to declare the gap in pay between the average male and average female salaries. Later in December 2016, he was one of only two MPs who voted against a Bill supporting the ratification of the Istanbul Convention (a Bill designed to protect women against violence). On 5 February 2013 Nuttall voted against in the House of Commons Second Reading vote on same-sex marriage in Britain.

=== Health Service ===
In October 2015 Nuttall joined with Conservative MPs Philip Davies and Christopher Chope to "talk out" a private members' bill intended to limit hospital parking charges for carers. In March 2016 he joined three other Conservative backbench MPs in "talking out" a bill by Green Party MP Caroline Lucas, which aimed to reverse moves to privatise the NHS. By filibustering for three and a half hours, he left Caroline Lucas with just 17 minutes to present her bill, which was subsequently shelved without a vote.

=== European Union ===
Nuttall was unsuccessful as one of the Conservative Party MEP candidates for the constituency of Yorkshire and the Humber in the 1999 European Parliament elections.

In 2011 Nuttall handed PM David Cameron a petition calling for an in/out referendum on Britain's membership of the EU after he got 100,000 signatures calling for it. Afterwards, Cameron said he would not back such a referendum saying "it is in Britain's interest to remain in the EU".

Nuttall was also the sponsor of Robert Broadhurst, Senior Researcher for and employee of the Eurosceptic European Research Group. The ERG is a part publicly funded, single issue, research support group for certain members of the parliamentary Conservative Party; the group's focus being the sole issue of the UK's withdrawal from the European Union. Nuttall claimed £13,850 of taxpayers' money as staffing costs in respect of his subscriptions to the ERG between July 2010 and April 2016.

Parliament of the United Kingdom
Preceded by David Chaytor	Member of Parliament for Bury North; 2010—2017	Succeeded by James Frith
