= Bolton North East =

UK Parliament constituency (since 1983)

Coordinates: 53.587°N 2.410°W

- Borough constituency for the House of Commons
- Interactive map of boundaries since 2024
- Boundary of Bolton North East in North West England
- County: Greater Manchester
- Population: 95,288 (2011 census)
- Electorate: 77,020 (2023)
- Major settlements: Bromley Cross

Current constituency
- Created: 1983
- Member of Parliament: Kirith Entwistle (Labour)
- Seats: One
- Created from: Bolton West; Bolton East; Darwen

Bolton North East is a constituency (Note: A borough constituency (for the purposes of election expenses and type of returning officer)) represented in the House of Commons of the UK Parliament since 2024 by Kirith Entwistle, a Labour Party MP. (Note: As with all constituencies, the constituency elects one Member of Parliament (MP) by the first past the post system of election at least every five years.)

== Constituency profile ==
The seat covers parts of Bolton town centre and extends into the West Pennine Moors. The districts in close proximity to the town centre (Breightmet, Crompton, Halliwell, Tonge with the Haulgh) are Labour-voting areas, whereas the outer suburbs (Astley Bridge, Bradshaw, Bromley Cross) are much more Conservative inclined. Altogether, the national statistics collected reflect a socially diverse seat in terms of income; this has been a highly marginal seat when national polls are close, with lower than average social housing, and less deprivation than the average for the metropolitan county.

== History ==
Bolton North East has more often than not to date been a marginal seat (Note: As it has more often than not given marginal majorities of less than 10%) between Labour and Conservative candidates. In 1992, Labour's David Crausby came tantalisingly close to gaining the seat, but did not, as his party were expecting to. It would not be until 1997 that Labour gained the seat, with a huge 12,000 majority, holding it for the next 22 years. Labour comfortably held the seat in 2010, with very little swing from the previous election. Mark Logan finally recaptured the seat for the Conservatives in 2019 with a majority of just 0.9%, making it their fourth most marginal seat over Labour.

Logan opted not to contest the 2024 election and, after the Dissolution of Parliament, he endorsed the Labour Party. Labour's candidate, Kirith Entwistle subsequently won the seat with a majority of over 15%, with the Conservatives coming second just ahead of Reform UK.

== Boundaries ==
=== Historic ===
Bolton North East was created for the 1983 general election from parts of the constituencies of Bolton West and the former Bolton East.

1983–1997: The Metropolitan Borough of Bolton wards of Astley Bridge, Bradshaw, Breightmet, Bromley Cross, Central, and Tonge.

1997–2010: The Metropolitan Borough of Bolton wards of Astley Bridge, Bradshaw, Breightmet, Bromley Cross, Central, Halliwell, and Tonge.

2010–2024: The Metropolitan Borough of Bolton wards of Astley Bridge, Bradshaw, Breightmet, Bromley Cross, Crompton, Halliwell, and Tonge with the Haulgh.

=== Current ===
Further to the 2023 review of Westminster constituencies which came into effect for the 2024 general election, the constituency was expanded to bring the electorate within the permitted range by transferring from Bolton South East the ward of Little Lever & Darcy Lever (as it existed on 1 December 2020).

Following a local government boundary review which came into effect in May 2023, the constituency now comprises the following wards of the Metropolitan Borough of Bolton from the 2024 general election:

- Astley Bridge; Bradshaw; Breightmet; Bromley Cross; Halliwell; Little Lever & Darcy Lever; Queens Park & Central (majority); Tonge with the Haulgh; and a very small part of Smithhills.

== Members of Parliament ==
Election	Member	Party
1983	Peter Thurnham	Conservative
Feb 1996	Peter Thurnham	Independent
Oct 1996	Peter Thurnham	Liberal Democrats
1997	Sir David Crausby	Labour
2019	Mark Logan	Conservative
2024	Kirith Entwistle	Labour

== Elections ==
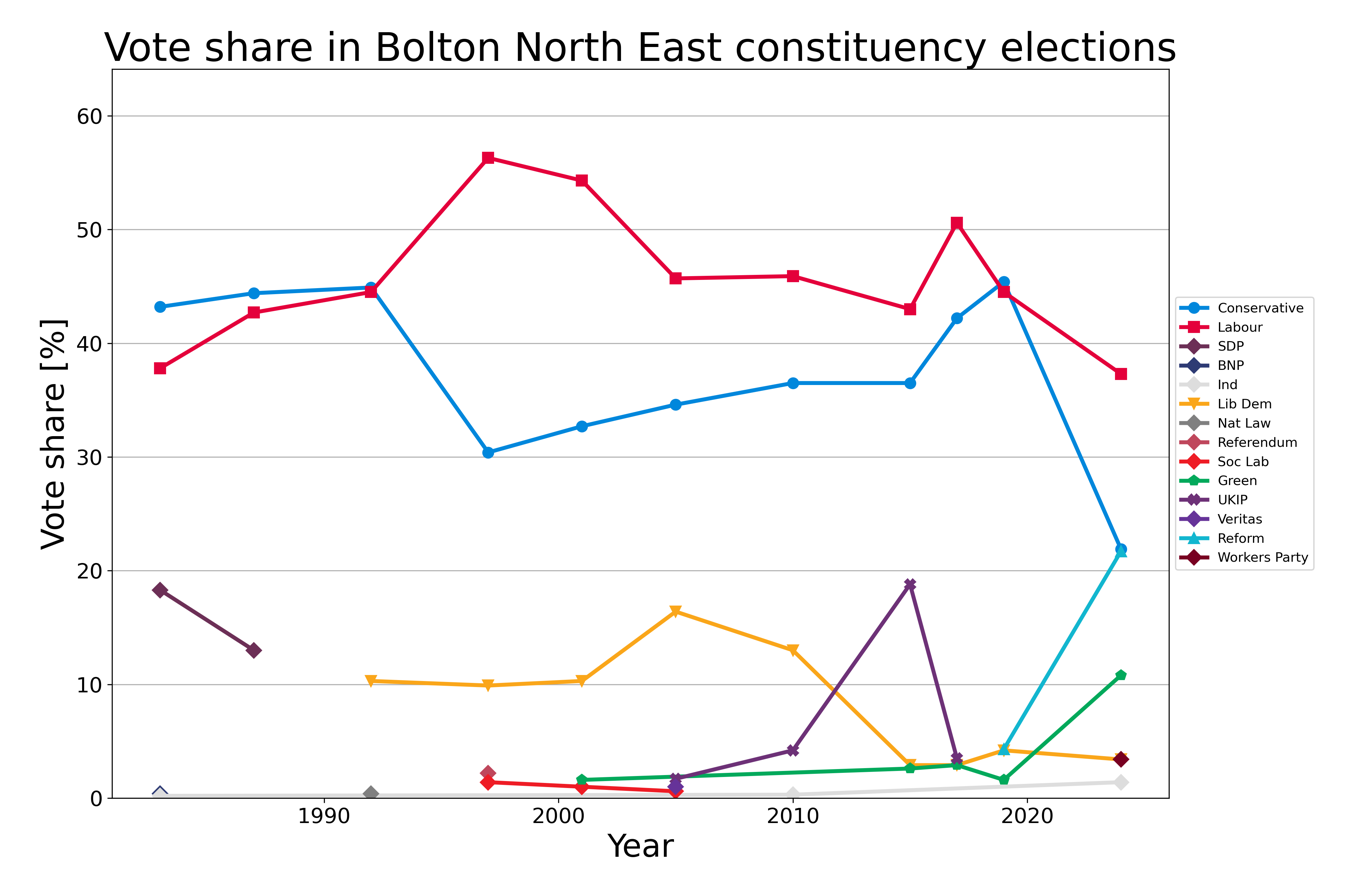
Bolton North East election results

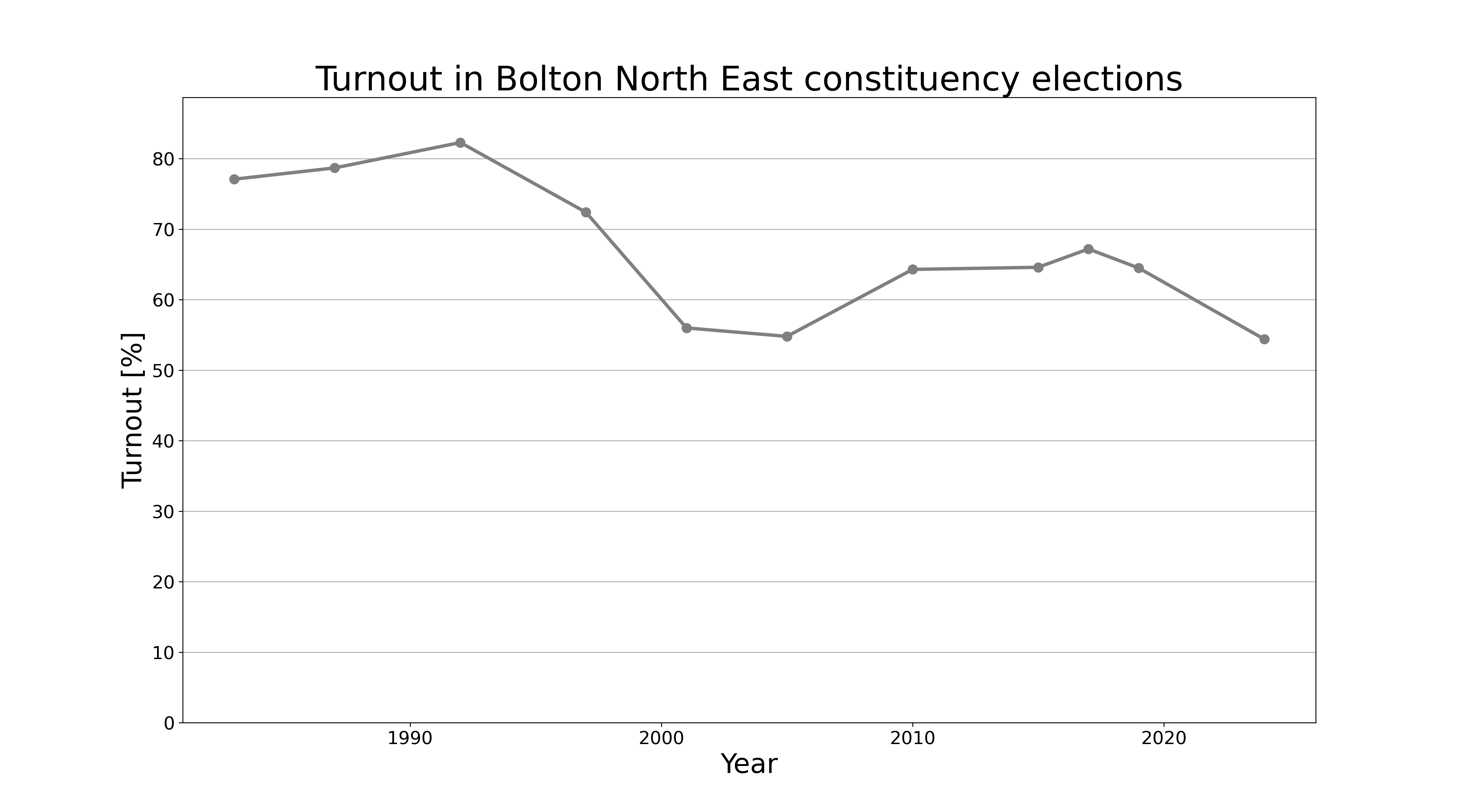
Bolton North East election turnout

=== Elections in the 2020s ===
General election 2024: Bolton North East
Party	Candidate	Votes	%	±%
Labour	Kirith Entwistle	16,166	37.3	−5.1
Conservative	Adele Warren	9,513	21.9	−23.1
Reform	Trevor Jones	9,428	21.7	+15.2
Green	Hanif Alli	4,683	10.8	+9.2
Liberal Democrats	Rebecca Forrest	1,507	3.5	−0.9
Workers Party	Syeda Kazmi	1,463	3.4	N/A
Independent	Kevin Allsop	345	0.8	N/A
Independent	John Partington	254	0.6	N/A
Majority		6,653	15.3	N/A
Turnout		43,359	54.2	−10.3
Registered electors		80,011		
Labour gain from Conservative		Swing	+8.1	

=== Elections in the 2010s ===
2019 notional result
Party	Vote	%
Conservative	22,436	45.0
Labour	21,158	42.4
Brexit Party	3,259	6.5
Liberal Democrats	2,188	4.4
Green	803	1.6
Turnout	49,844	64.7
Electorate	77,020	

General election 2019: Bolton North East
Party	Candidate	Votes	%	±%
Conservative	Mark Logan	19,759	45.4	+3.2
Labour	David Crausby	19,381	44.5	−6.1
Brexit Party	Trevor Jones	1,880	4.3	N/A
Liberal Democrats	Warren Fox	1,847	4.2	+1.3
Green	Liz Spencer	689	1.6	+0.8
Majority		378	0.9	N/A
Turnout		43,556	64.5	−2.7
Conservative gain from Labour		Swing	+4.7	

General election 2017: Bolton North East
Party	Candidate	Votes	%	±%
Labour	David Crausby	22,870	50.6	+7.6
Conservative	James Daly	19,073	42.2	+9.4
UKIP	Harry Lamb	1,567	3.5	−15.3
Liberal Democrats	Warren Fox	1,316	2.9	0.0
Green	Liz Spencer	357	0.8	−1.8
Majority		3,797	8.4	−1.8
Turnout		45,183	67.2	+3.6
Labour hold		Swing	−0.8	

General election 2015: Bolton North East
Party	Candidate	Votes	%	±%
Labour	David Crausby	18,541	43.0	−3.1
Conservative	James Daly	14,164	32.8	−3.7
UKIP	Harry Lamb	8,117	18.8	+14.6
Liberal Democrats	Stephen Rock	1,236	2.9	−10.1
Green	Laura Diggle	1,103	2.6	N/A
Majority		4,377	10.2	+0.8
Turnout		43,161	63.6	−0.7
Labour hold		Swing		

General election 2010: Bolton North East
Party	Candidate	Votes	%	±%
Labour	David Crausby	19,870	45.9	−0.4
Conservative	Deborah Dunleavy	15,786	36.5	+2.2
Liberal Democrats	Paul Ankers	5,624	13.0	−3.1
UKIP	Neil Johnson	1,815	4.2	+2.4
You Party	Norma Armston	182	0.4	N/A
Majority		4,084	9.4	−2.5
Turnout		43,277	64.3	+9.8
Labour hold		Swing	−1.3	

=== Elections in the 2000s ===
General election 2005: Bolton North East
Party	Candidate	Votes	%	±%
Labour	David Crausby	16,874	45.7	−8.6
Conservative	Paul Brierley	12,771	34.6	+1.9
Liberal Democrats	Adam Killeya	6,044	16.4	+6.1
UKIP	Kevin Epsom	640	1.7	N/A
Veritas	Alan Ainscow	375	1.0	N/A
Socialist Labour	Lynne Lowe	207	0.6	−0.4
Majority		4,103	11.1	−10.5
Turnout		36,911	54.8	−1.2
Labour hold		Swing	−5.2	

General election 2001: Bolton North East
Party	Candidate	Votes	%	±%
Labour	David Crausby	21,166	54.3	−1.8
Conservative	Michael Winstanley	12,744	32.7	+2.3
Liberal Democrats	Tim Perkins	4,004	10.3	+0.4
Green	Kenneth McIvor	629	1.6	N/A
Socialist Labour	Lynne Lowe	407	1.0	−0.4
Majority		8,422	21.6	−4.1
Turnout		38,950	56.0	−16.4
Labour hold		Swing		

=== Elections in the 1990s ===
General election 1997: Bolton North East
Party	Candidate	Votes	%	±%
Labour	David Crausby	27,621	56.1	
Conservative	Rob Wilson	14,952	30.4	
Liberal Democrats	Edmund Critchley	4,862	9.9	
Referendum	David Staniforth	1,096	2.2	N/A
Socialist Labour	William Kelly	676	1.4	N/A
Majority		12,669	25.7	
Turnout		49,207	72.4	
Labour hold		Swing	+10.2	

For the 1997 general election the boundaries of the seat were significantly redrawn. The Times Guide to the House of Commons 1997 estimated that had the new boundaries been used for the previous general election rather than being narrowly held by the Conservatives, the seat would have been won by the Labour candidate with a majority of 3,017 over the Conservatives. Thus technically the seat was notionally a Labour hold at this election rather than a gain for the party. The swing above is based on this notional result.

General election 1992: Bolton North East
Party	Candidate	Votes	%	±%
Conservative	Peter Thurnham	21,644	44.9	+0.5
Labour	David Crausby	21,459	44.5	+1.8
Liberal Democrats	Brian Dunning	4,971	10.3	−2.7
Natural Law	Peter Tong	181	0.4	N/A
Majority		185	0.4	−1.3
Turnout		48,255	82.3	+3.6
Conservative hold		Swing	−0.7	

=== Elections in the 1980s ===
General election 1987: Bolton North East
Party	Candidate	Votes	%	±%
Conservative	Peter Thurnham	20,742	44.4	+1.2
Labour	Frank White	19,929	42.7	+4.9
SDP	John Alcock	6,060	13.0	−5.3
Majority		813	1.7	−3.7
Turnout		46,731	78.7	+1.6
Conservative hold		Swing		

General election 1983: Bolton North East
Party	Candidate	Votes	%	±%
Conservative	Peter Thurnham	19,632	43.2	
Labour	Ann Taylor	17,189	37.8	
SDP	John Alcock	8,311	18.3	
BNP	David P. Ball	186	0.4	
Independent	Thomas Keen	104	0.2	
Majority		2,443	5.4	
Turnout		45,318	77.1	
Conservative win (new seat)				

== See also ==
- List of parliamentary constituencies in Greater Manchester
