= David Crausby =

British politician

Sir David Crausby
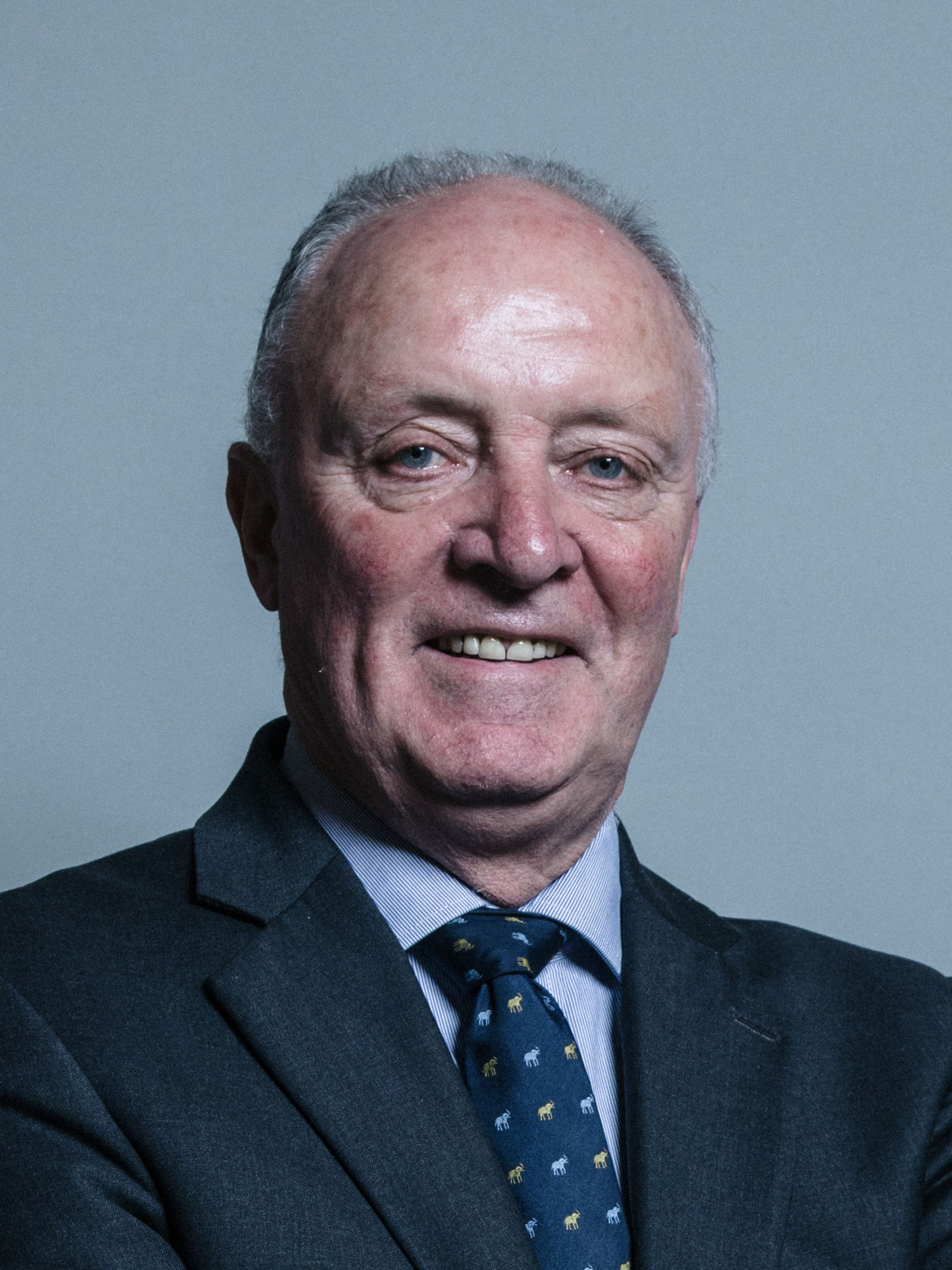
- Official portrait, 2017

Member of Parliament; for Bolton North East
- In office 1 May 1997 – 6 November 2019
- Preceded by: Peter Thurnham
- Succeeded by: Mark Logan

Member of Bury Council
- In office 3 May 1979 – 3 May 1984
- Ward: East
- Succeeded by: John Byrne
- In office 3 May 1984 – 7 May 1992
- Ward: Redvales
- Preceded by: M. Hall
- Succeeded by: C. Fitzgerald

Personal details
- Born: 17 June 1946 (age 80) Bury, Lancashire, England
- Party: Labour
- Spouse: Enid Anne Noon (m. 1965)
- Children: 2

Sir David Anthony Crausby (born 17 June 1946) is a British Labour politician who served as Member of Parliament (MP) for Bolton North East from the 1997 general election until his defeat in 2019.

Born in Bury, Lancashire, Crausby worked as a turner and later became a workplace representative for the Amalgamated Engineering Union. He was a Member of Bury Metropolitan Borough Council from 1979 to 1992, and elected as an MP at the 1997 general election.

A backbencher throughout his tenure in Parliament, Crausby was a long-serving member of the Defence Select Committee and Panel of Chairs. He represented the UK internationally as a delegate to the Nato and Council of Europe Parliamentary Assemblies, and was knighted in the 2017 New Year Honours. Crausby lost his seat to the Conservative candidate Mark Logan at the 2019 general election, as part of the "Red Wall" of traditionally safe Labour constituencies in Northern England that swung to the Conservatives that year.

== Early life and career ==
Crausby was born in Bury, Lancashire and educated locally at Derby Grammar School, now Derby High School, and Bury Technical College. He began a career as a turner, becoming an apprentice centre lathe turner in 1962, and later became works convenor for the Amalgamated Engineering Union at Beloit Walmsleys Ltd in Bolton. He remained in this position until his election to the House of Commons in 1997. He was elected a councillor in 1979 to the then Bury District Council, and served until 1992.

== Parliamentary career ==
He contested the marginal Bury North seat, having been just elected as chairman of the local constituency Labour Party, at the 1987 general election but was defeated by the sitting Conservative MP Alistair Burt by 6,911 votes. He contested the Conservative-held marginal seat of Bolton North East at the 1992 general election where the sitting MP Peter Thurnham was defending an 813 majority. Bolton North East became more marginal with Thurnham retaining the seat by just 185 votes.

Thurnham retired at the 1997 general election, having crossed the floor to join the Liberal Democrats on 12 October 1996. Crausby defeated the new Conservative candidate, Rob Wilson, by 12,669 votes. He made his maiden speech on 17 July 1997, in which he remembered the inventor of the spinning mule Samuel Crompton who was born in Bolton.

Crausby remained the MP there from 1997 until 2019. His majority fell to 8,422 in 2001 and 4,103 in 2005. In the 2010 and 2015 general elections his majorities were 4,084 and 4,377. In the 2017 general election he was again returned, with a majority of 3,797. He lost his seat to the Conservative Mark Logan by 378 votes in the 2019 general election.

In parliament, Crausby joined the Social Security Select committee in 1999, and was a member of the Defence Select Committee from the 2001 general election to 2010. He voted against the Iraq War in 2003.

In 2010 he became a member of the Speaker's Panel of Chairs and has overseen many debates in the Commons on behalf of the speaker, including the historic European Union (Withdrawal) Act 2018.

Crausby has a long-standing interest in improving railways in his constituency. He lobbied the last Labour government to address overcrowding and opposed the idea of a Greater Manchester congestion charge because of the lack of viable alternatives. He campaigned to retain the Preston-Bolton-Manchester electrification project which was at risk of cancellation after Labour lost the 2010 election. He has continued to lobby the Government through letters, petitions, and Parliamentary debates. In 2018 Crausby led a debate on Northern trains and called for the resignation of Transport Secretary Chris Grayling after the disastrous May timetable caused mass disruption across the North of England.

Crausby has also been involved in international politics. He represented the UK as a member of the delegation to the NATO Parliamentary Assembly from 2005 to 2015 and the UK delegation to the Parliamentary Assembly of the Council of Europe from 2013 to 2017.

In 2011, Crausby won The House magazine's Commons Speech of the Year, for his speech on bringing the military covenant into law, beating the then prime minister, David Cameron.

In February 2013, Crausby voted against the second reading of the Marriage (Same Sex Couples) Act 2013. Subsequently, in May 2013 the MP voted against the bill's third and final reading, opposing the legalisation of same-sex marriage within England and Wales.

Crausby was knighted in the 2017 New Year Honours. Crausby lost his seat at the 2019 General Election.

== Personal life ==
He married Enid Anne Noon in 1965 in Bury and they have two sons. His eldest son, also named David, is a commercial and editorial photographer; his work is represented by several agencies including Getty Images and Alamy. His son is currently based in Germany.

Parliament of the United Kingdom
Preceded by Peter Thurnham	Member of Parliament for Bolton North East; 1997–2019	Succeeded by Mark Logan
