= James Grundy (politician) =

British Conservative politician

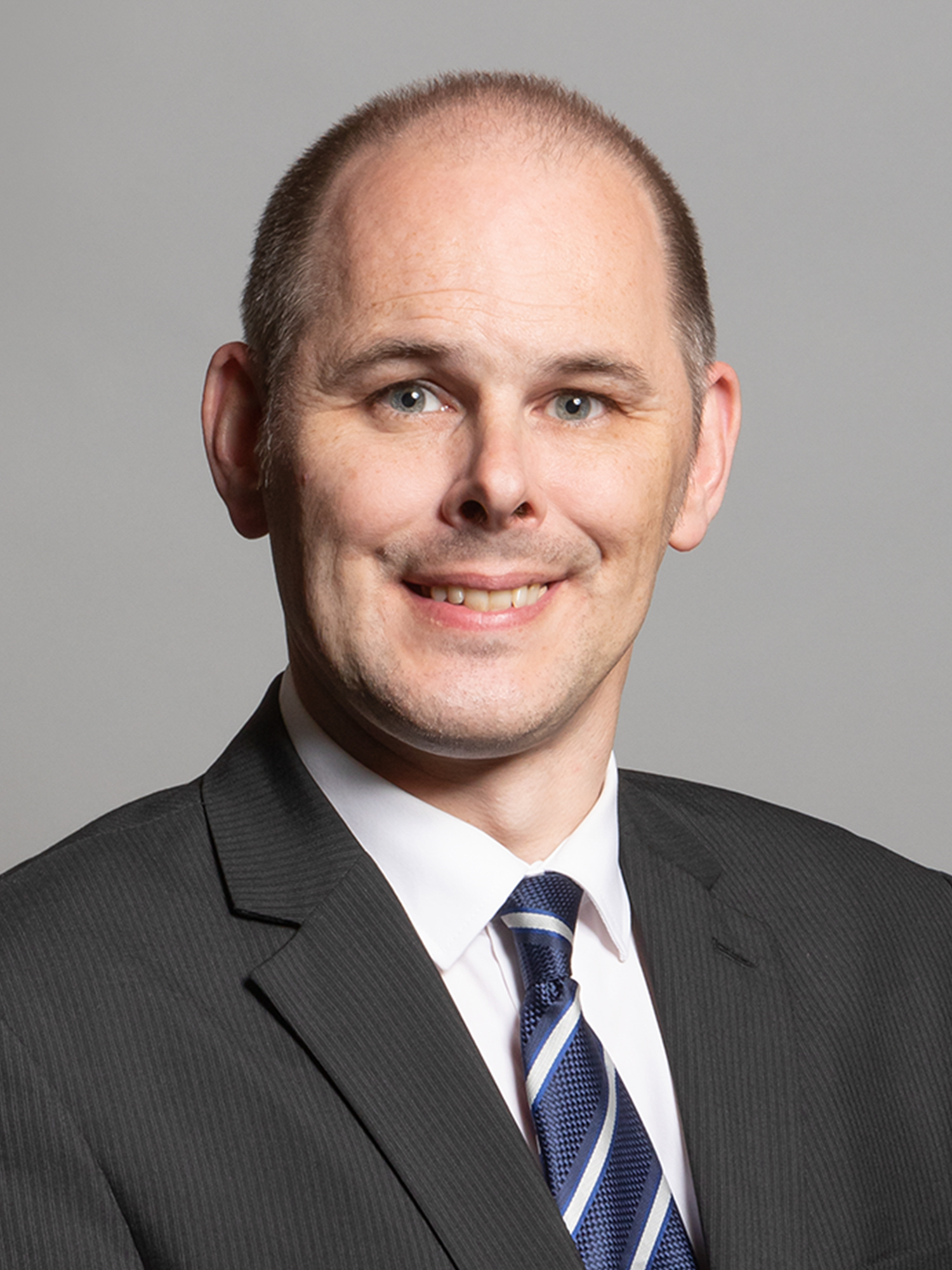
- Official portrait, 2020

Member of Parliament for Leigh
- In office 12 December 2019 – 30 May 2024
- Preceded by: Jo Platt
- Succeeded by: Constituency abolished

Councillor for Lowton East
- In office 1 May 2008 – 7 May 2021
- Preceded by: Ian Franzen
- Succeeded by: Marie Cooper

Personal details
- Born: James Nelson Grundy; 8 December 1978 (age 47) Warrington, Cheshire, England
- Party: Conservative
- Website: www.jamesgrundy.org.uk

James Nelson Grundy (born 8 December 1978) is a British Conservative Party politician who served as Member of Parliament (MP) for Leigh from 2019 to 2024.

== Early life ==
Grundy was born in Warrington, and raised on the family farm in Lowton, where he still resides. Grundy was also educated locally, having attended both Lowton St Mary's Primary School and Lowton High School.

== Political career ==
Grundy was elected to represent the Lowton East ward on Wigan Metropolitan Borough Council as a councillor in the 2008 local elections. He was elected to Parliament at the 2019 general election, taking the seat from Labour's Jo Platt. This made Grundy the first ever Conservative MP to represent the Leigh constituency since its creation; it was one of several Tory gains in the "Red Wall" of Northern England. He had previously stood in Leigh in 2017, and was heavily defeated by Platt. His win in the 2019 rematch saw the largest 2017 majority for a party overturned in the country.

Grundy's general election campaign pledges included respecting Leigh's vote to leave the EU in 2016; fighting for vital local transport infrastructure, such as the completion of the Atherleigh Way Bypass, and the re-opening of Golborne and Kenyon Junction stations; and securing investment for Leigh's town centres.

In 2020, Grundy put forward two bids to the Government's Restoring Your Railway Ideas Fund, progressing his pledge to get Kenyon Junction and Golborne Station reopened, following their closure after the Beeching Report. The latter is due to be reopened in 2027.

During the COVID-19 pandemic, Grundy was actively involved in supporting local people and local businesses. He supported local market traders' calls to open food stalls at Leigh Market as soon as the Government lifted restrictions.

In February 2020, a video recording obtained by LBC showed Grundy publicly exposing his genitals in front of a woman at an event in the Rams Head Inn, Lowton, in 2007. Since the event, Grundy has apologised for the incident and the distress he caused.

In the summer of 2020, Grundy launched his "Shop Safe, Shop Local" campaign, which encouraged local people to return to their local high street following the Coronavirus pandemic. The petition gained hundreds of signatures, and encouraged Wigan Council to deliver two hours' free parking on weekdays in Leigh's town centres, increased hand sanitization stations on the high street, and free face coverings for shoppers provided to local independent businesses.

As MP for Leigh, Grundy wrote regular columns for both the Wigan Observer and Leigh Journal, to update constituents of local issues.

Grundy announced in May 2024 that he would step down from Parliament at the forthcoming general election.

Parliament of the United Kingdom
Preceded by Joanne Platt	Member of Parliament for Leigh; 2019–2024	Constituency abolished
