= Kirith Entwistle =

British politician

Kirith Entwistle MP
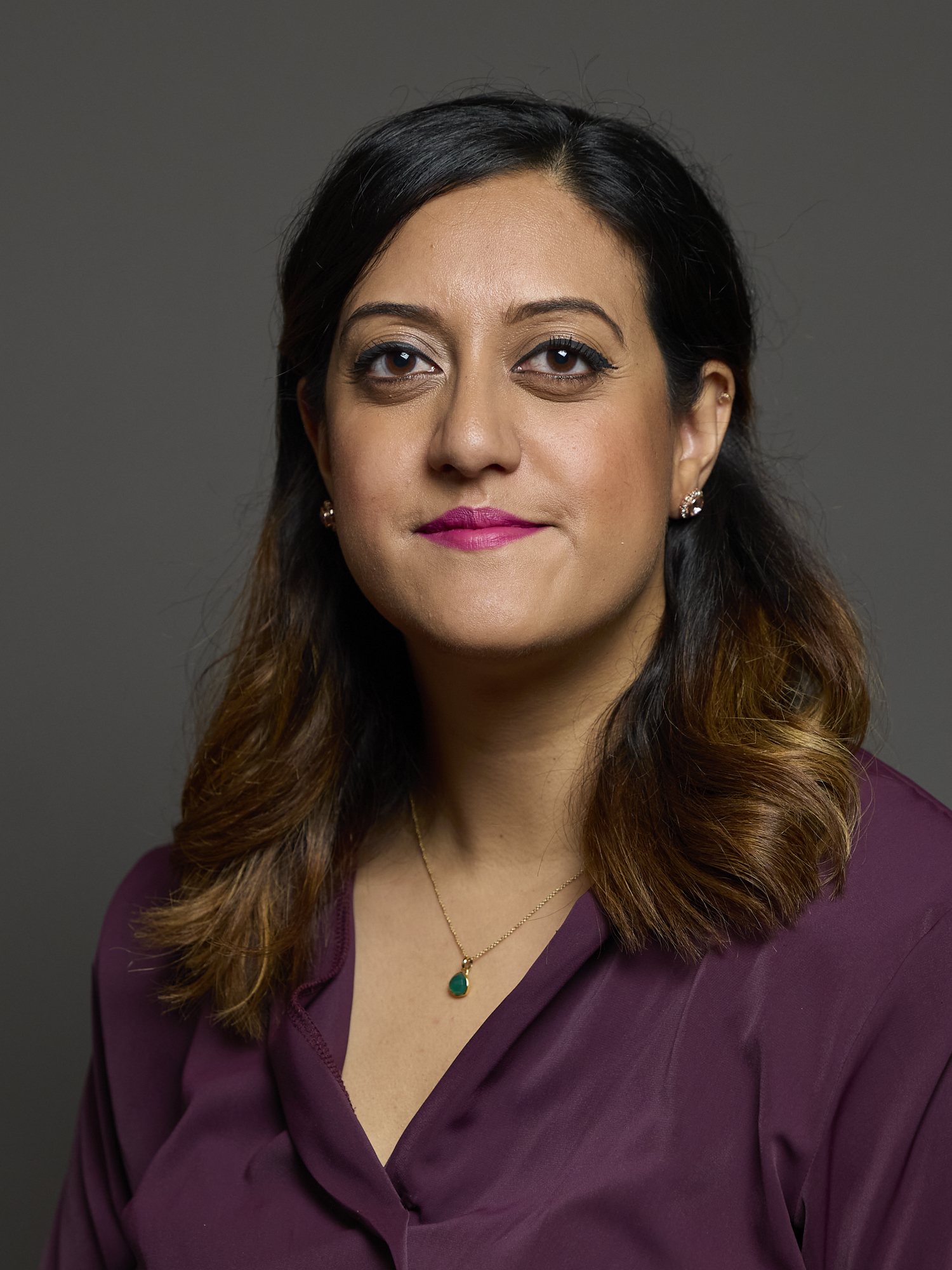
- Official portrait, 2024

Member of Parliament for Bolton North East
- Incumbent
- Assumed office 4 July 2024
- Preceded by: Mark Logan
- Majority: 6,653 (15.3%)

Personal details
- Born: Kirith Kaur Ahluwalia c. 1991 Southall, London, England
- Party: Labour
- Education: University of Portsmouth

Kirith Entwistle (née Kaur Ahluwalia; born c. 1991), is a British Labour Party politician serving as the Member of Parliament for Bolton North East since the 2024 general election.

== Background ==
Kirith Entwistle was born in Southall, London. Her grandparents are Kenyan Indians who migrated to the United Kingdom during the 1970s. Her father, originally from Delhi, moved to the UK in the 1980s. Entwistle graduated from the University of Portsmouth in 2012 with a Bachelor of Arts (BA) degree in American Studies. According to Bolton News, Entwistle worked "for a charity campaigning against loneliness and previously for the Royal British Legion".

Prior to her election, she was a policy, communications and public affairs manager for WaveLength Charity. She is the first Sikh to represent Bolton North East. She was also previously a member of the Young Fabians executive committee.

== Parliamentary career ==
Entwistle stood for election to Bolton Council in 2019 as the Labour Party Candidate for Bradshaw ward.

Entwistle was elected as Labour MP for the Bolton North East constituency in the 2024 general election.

Entwistle is a Member of the Women and Equalities Select Committee and The Modernisation Committee Since September 2025 she has been Parliamentary Private Secretary to the government’s Treasury team.

When MPs debated the Universal Credit Bill, Entwistle was one of the Labour rebels who backed the reasoned amendment, which forced concessions from the Government.

She has championed new laws to protected women and girls from non-consensual image abuse and worked with the campaign Dad Shift to advocate for improved paternal leave. In July 2025, she became co-Chair of a new group of Labour MPs, the Labour Group on Violence Against Women and Girls, to promote and champion policies that prevent and respond to violence against women and girls in all its forms.

She runs an annual Youth Drop-in event in her constituency, bringing together organisations that provide work, volunteering and development opportunities for 16–25 year olds.
