= Leigh and Atherton =

UK Parliament constituency (since 2024)

- Borough constituency for the House of Commons
- Interactive map of boundaries since 2024
- Location within North West England
- County: Greater Manchester
- Electorate: 76,363 (March 2020)
- Major settlements: Leigh, Atherton, Golborne, Lowton

Current constituency
- Created: 2024
- Member of Parliament: Jo Platt (Labour Co-op)
- Seats: One
- Created from: Leigh & Bolton West

Leigh and Atherton is a constituency of the House of Commons in the UK Parliament. It was created by the 2023 review of Westminster constituencies and was first contested at the 2024 general election. Since 2024, it has been represented by Jo Platt of the Labour Party, who had been MP for the predecessor seat of Leigh from 2017 to 2019.

== Constituency profile ==
Leigh and Atherton is a constituency in the Metropolitan Borough of Wigan in Greater Manchester and traditionally part of Lancashire. It is centred on the town of Leigh, which has a population of around 49,000, and also includes the nearby towns of Atherton, Tyldesley and Golborne and the villages of Lowton and Higher Folds. This area has an industrial heritage with a history of textile manufacturing, metalworking and coal mining. Leigh has high levels of deprivation whilst the rest of the constituency is average in terms of wealth. House prices are low compared to the rest of North West England and considerably lower than the national average.

In general, residents of Leigh and Atherton have low levels of income and education and are more religious than the rest of the country. Rates of child poverty and unemployment benefits are around average for the United Kingdom. Few residents work in professional occupations and a high proportion work in the retail and construction sectors. White people made up 94% of residents in the 2021 census. Almost all seats in the constituency at the local borough council are represented by the Labour Party, except Atherton which elected independent councillors. Voters in the constituency strongly supported leaving the European Union in the 2016 referendum; an estimated 65% voted in favour of Brexit compared to the nationwide figure of 52%.

== Boundaries ==
Further to the 2023 boundary review, the composition of the constituency was defined as being composed of the following electoral wards of the Metropolitan Borough of Wigan (as they existed on 1 December 2020):

- Atherleigh (except part of polling district LCA); Atherton; Golborne and Lowton West; Leigh East; Leigh South; Leigh West (polling districts LDB, LDC, LDD, LDE and LDF); Lowton East; Tyldesley.

Following a local government boundary review which came into effect in May 2023, the constituency now comprises the following wards or part wards of the Metropolitan Borough of Wigan from the 2024 general election:

- Astley (small part); Atherton North; Atherton South & Lilford; Golborne and Lowton West; Leigh Central & Higher Folds; Leigh South; Leigh West (most); Lowton East; Tyldesley & Mosley Common (majority); and a very small part of Hindley Green

The seat covers the bulk of, and replaces, the Leigh constituency, with the town of Atherton being added from Bolton West.

== Members of Parliament ==
Election	Member	Party
2024	Jo Platt	Labour Co-op

== Elections ==
=== Elections in the 2020s ===
General election 2024: Leigh and Atherton
Party	Candidate	Votes	%	±%
Labour Co-op	Jo Platt	19,971	48.5	+5.3
Reform	George Woodward	11,090	26.9	+21.1
Conservative	Michael Winstanley	6,483	15.7	−28.1
Green	Amelia Jones	1,653	4.0	+3.7
Liberal Democrats	Stuart Thomas	1,597	3.9	−0.7
English Democrat	Craig Buckley	376	0.9	N/A
Majority		8,881	21.6	N/A
Turnout		41,170	51.6	−6.4
Registered electors		79,978		
Labour Co-op gain from Conservative		Swing	−7.9	

=== Elections in the 2010s ===
2019 notional result
Party	Vote	%
Conservative	19,410	43.8
Labour	19,117	43.2
Brexit Party	2,572	5.8
Liberal Democrats	2,031	4.6
Others	999	2.2
Green	154	0.3
Turnout	44,283	58.0
Electorate	76,363	
