= Bury North =

UK Parliament constituency (since 1983)

Coordinates: 53.607°N 2.299°W

- Borough constituency for the House of Commons
- Interactive map of boundaries since 2024
- Location within North West England
- County: Greater Manchester
- Population: 87,218 (2011 UK Census)
- Electorate: 77,009 (March 2020)
- Major settlements: Bury, Ramsbottom, Tottington, Radcliffe (part), Greenmount, Summerseat,

Current constituency
- Created: 1983
- Member of Parliament: James Frith (Labour)
- Seats: One
- Created from: Rossendale (part); Bury and Radcliffe (part)

Bury North is a borough constituency in Greater Manchester, created in 1983 and represented in the House of Commons of the UK Parliament. With a Conservative majority of 105 votes, it was the most marginal constituency for a sitting MP in the United Kingdom at the 2019 general election. At the 2024 general election, James Frith regained the seat which he had held for Labour from 2017 to 2019.

== History ==
Bury North is a marginal seat between Labour and the Conservatives, and a bellwether constituency throughout most of its existence — the winner of the seat has tended to win the general election, with 2017 being an exceptional Labour gain, though it was subsequently regained by the Conservatives in 2019. In forerunner seats, the town of Bury did not have a Labour MP until 1964, since when Bury North has become reported on as an important marginal seat.

The 2010 Conservative win at Bury North was the Conservative Party's sole gain in Greater Manchester. The 2015 general election result was narrower, which produced the fifth-most marginal majority of the Conservative Party's 331 seats by percentage of majority. The 2019 general election result made this the most marginal constituency in Great Britain, with a narrow majority of 105 votes. Only Sinn Féin's majority of 57 in Fermanagh and South Tyrone was lower in the UK, and as Sinn Féin members do not take their seats, Daly's majority was therefore the smallest for that of a sitting MP.

Despite boundary changes which were favorable to the Conservatives, Labour retook the seat in 2024 with a majority of over 15%.

== Boundaries ==
=== Historic ===
The constituency of Bury North covers the towns of Ramsbottom, Tottington and Bury. It was created in 1983 from parts of the former seats of Rossendale and Bury and Radcliffe. In those boundary changes Ramsbottom was transferred from Rossendale to Bury North, while with the loss of Ramsbottom, Rossendale was linked with Darwen. In 2010 the Unsworth area was transferred to Bury South.

1983–2010: The Metropolitan Borough of Bury wards of Church, East, Elton, Moorside, Ramsbottom, Redvales, Tottington, and Unsworth.

2010–2024: The Metropolitan Borough of Bury wards of Church, East, Elton, Moorside, North Manor, Ramsbottom, Redvales, and Tottington.

=== Current ===
Further to the 2023 review of Westminster constituencies which came into effect for the 2024 general election, the constituency was expanded to bring the electorate within the permitted range by transferring from Bury South the ward of Radcliffe North (as it existed on 1 December 2020).

Following a local government boundary review which came into effect in May 2022, the constituency now comprises the following wards of the Metropolitan Borough of Bury from the 2024 general election:

- Bury East; Bury West (nearly all); Elton; Moorside; North Manor; Radcliffe North & Ainsworth (most); Ramsbottom; Redvales; Tottington; and a small part of Unsworth.

== Constituency profile ==
Despite its name, Bury North includes the entirety of the town of Bury, its name signifying the northern half of the wider metropolitan borough named after it. A traditional Labour-Conservative marginal, Ramsbottom and Tottington are mostly Conservative, but in the case of Ramsbottom, not always overwhelmingly so, whereas the town of Bury itself (particularly the Bury East ward) is generally more favourable to Labour, with Elton being a marginal. Tottington, Church ward and the rural North Manor ward are safely Conservative, however Ramsbottom is now a Labour marginal, re-gained by the party in 2018. The 2011 Ramsbottom local election was famously a tie between the Labour and Conservative candidates, decided by drawing straws which Labour won and took control of the council.

Ramsbottom, one of the towns in the rural north of the constituency, with Peel Monument in the distance.

The wards surrounding the town centre include some terraced and social housing and is ethnically diverse. The Bury town centre itself features two large sixth form colleges, the 'World Famous' market famed for Black Pudding as well as newer shopping and leisure developments such as The Rock. Tourist attractions include the East Lancashire Heritage Railway and Fusiliers Museum. North of Bury the area becomes more rural, approaching the provincial towns of Tottington and Ramsbottom, which are becoming increasingly desirable for Manchester commuters looking for quieter housing overlooking the West Pennines. Ramsbottom features Peel Monument, a tower on Holcombe Hill dedicated to former Conservative Prime Minister Robert Peel who was born in Bury. The tower is occasionally opened by volunteers, which offers views across Greater Manchester and as far out as Cheshire.

The constituency voted Leave in the 2016 referendum with a margin close to that of the national average at an estimated 54%.

== Members of Parliament ==
Election	Member	Party
1983	Alistair Burt	Conservative
1997	David Chaytor	Labour
2010	David Nuttall	Conservative
2017	James Frith	Labour
2019	James Daly	Conservative
2024	James Frith	Labour

== Elections ==
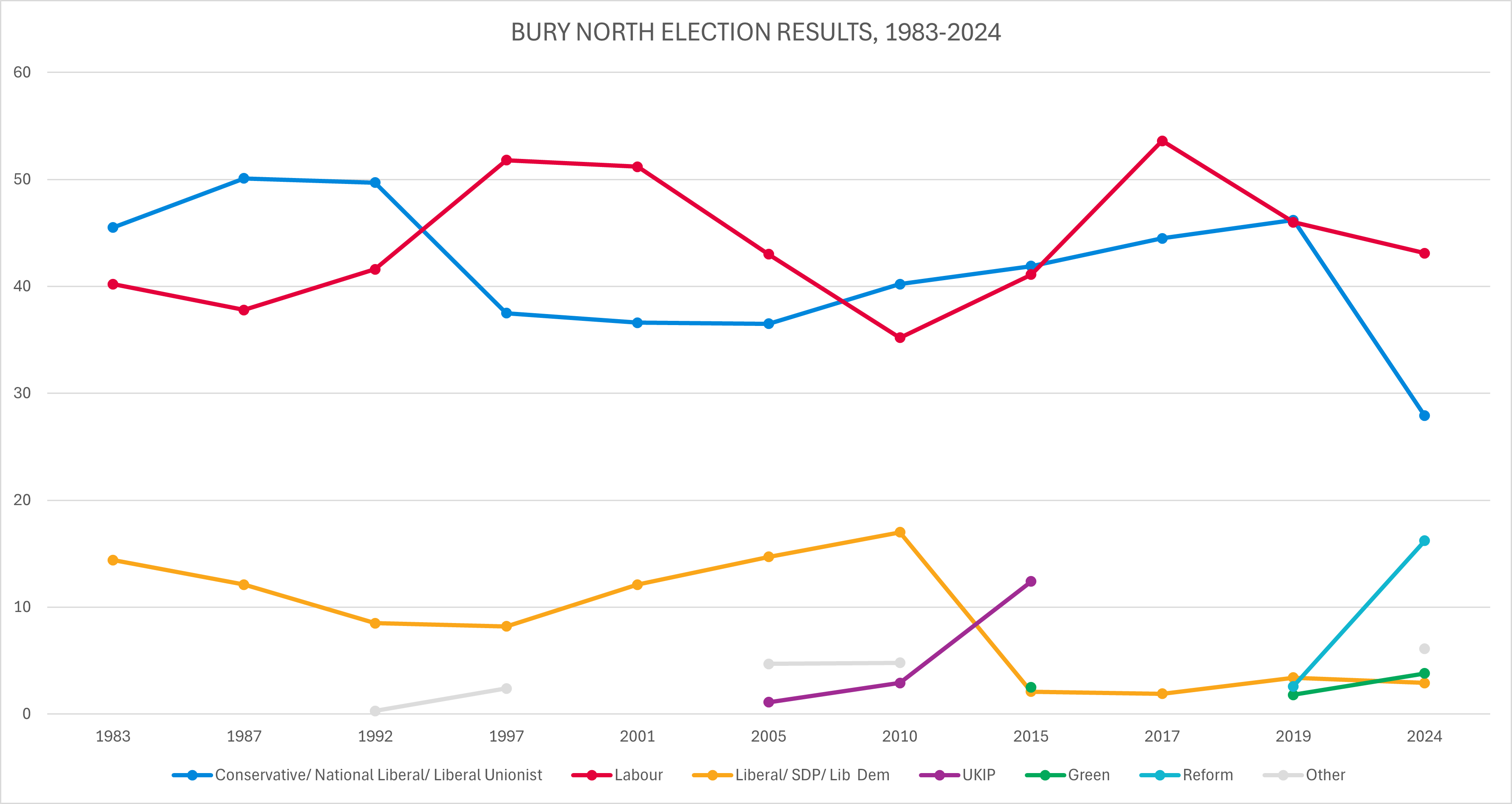
Election results 1983-2024

=== Elections in the 2020s ===
General election 2024: Bury North
Party	Candidate	Votes	%	±%
Labour	James Frith	19,625	43.1	–1.8
Conservative	James Daly	12,681	27.9	–19.4
Reform	Lynda Rosewell	7,385	16.2	+13.5
Workers Party	Shafat Ali	1,917	4.2	N/A
Green	Owain Sutton	1,747	3.8	+2.0
Liberal Democrats	Mark Alcock	1,317	2.9	–0.2
Independent	Anwarul Haq	571	1.3	N/A
Independent	Spencer Donnelly	277	0.6	N/A
Majority		6,944	15.2	N/A
Turnout		45,520	58.5	−10.8
Registered electors		77,703		
Labour gain from Conservative		Swing	+8.8	

=== Elections in the 2010s ===
2019 notional result
Party	Vote	%
Conservative	25,285	47.3
Labour	24,003	44.9
Liberal Democrats	1,639	3.1
Brexit Party	1,446	2.7
Green	939	1.8
Others	158	0.3
Turnout	53,470	69.4
Electorate	77,009	

General election 2019: Bury North
Party	Candidate	Votes	%	±%
Conservative	James Daly	21,660	46.2	+1.7
Labour	James Frith	21,555	46.0	–7.6
Liberal Democrats	Gareth Lloyd-Johnson	1,584	3.4	+1.5
Brexit Party	Alan McCarthy	1,240	2.6	N/A
Green	Charlie Allen	802	1.8	N/A
Majority		105	0.2	N/A
Turnout		46,841	68.1	–2.8
Conservative gain from Labour		Swing	+ 4.7	

This was the smallest Conservative majority at the 2019 general election.

General election 2017: Bury North
Party	Candidate	Votes	%	±%
Labour	James Frith	25,683	53.6	+12.5
Conservative	David Nuttall	21,308	44.5	+2.6
Liberal Democrats	Richard Baum	912	1.9	–0.2
Majority		4,375	9.1	N/A
Turnout		47,903	70.9	+4.0
Labour gain from Conservative		Swing	+ 5.0	

General election 2015: Bury North
Party	Candidate	Votes	%	±%
Conservative	David Nuttall	18,970	41.9	+1.7
Labour	James Frith	18,592	41.1	+5.9
UKIP	Ian Henderson	5,595	12.4	+9.5
Green	John Southworth	1,141	2.5	N/A
Liberal Democrats	Richard Baum	932	2.1	−14.9
Majority		378	0.8	−4.2
Turnout		45,230	66.9	−0.4
Conservative hold		Swing	−2.1	

General election 2010: Bury North
Party	Candidate	Votes	%	±%
Conservative	David Nuttall	18,070	40.2	+3.7
Labour	Maryam Khan	15,827	35.2	−7.8
Liberal Democrats	Richard Baum	7,645	17.0	+1.9
BNP	John Maude	1,825	4.1	+0.1
UKIP	Stephen Evans	1,282	2.9	+1.8
Independent	Bill Brison	181	0.4	N/A
Pirate	Graeme Lambert	131	0.3	N/A
Majority		2,243	5.0	N/A
Turnout		44,961	67.3	+5.7
Conservative gain from Labour		Swing	+5.8	

=== Elections in the 2000s ===
General election 2005: Bury North
Party	Candidate	Votes	%	±%
Labour	David Chaytor	19,130	43.0	−8.2
Conservative	David Nuttall	16,204	36.5	−0.1
Liberal Democrats	Wilfred Davison	6,514	14.7	+2.6
BNP	Stewart Clough	1,790	4.0	N/A
UKIP	Philip Silver	476	1.1	N/A
Socialist Labour	Ryan O'Neill	172	0.4	N/A
Veritas	Ian Upton	153	0.3	N/A
Majority		2,926	6.5	−8.1
Turnout		44,439	61.5	−1.5
Labour hold		Swing	−4.0	

General election 2001: Bury North
Party	Candidate	Votes	%	±%
Labour	David Chaytor	22,945	51.2	−0.6
Conservative	John Walsh	16,413	36.6	−0.9
Liberal Democrats	Bryn Hackley	5,430	12.1	+3.9
Majority		6,532	14.6	+0.3
Turnout		44,788	63.0	−14.8
Labour hold		Swing	+0.1	

=== Elections in the 1990s ===
General election 1997: Bury North
Party	Candidate	Votes	%	±%
Labour	David Chaytor	28,523	51.8	+10.2
Conservative	Alistair Burt	20,657	37.5	−12.2
Liberal Democrats	Neville Kenyon	4,536	8.2	−0.3
Referendum	Richard Hallewell	1,337	2.4	N/A
Majority		7,866	14.3	N/A
Turnout		55,053	77.8	−7.0
Labour gain from Conservative		Swing	+11.2	

General election 1992: Bury North
Party	Candidate	Votes	%	±%
Conservative	Alistair Burt	29,266	49.7	−0.4
Labour	Jim Dobbin	24,502	41.6	+3.8
Liberal Democrats	Colin McGrath	5,010	8.5	−3.6
Natural Law	Michael Sullivan	163	0.3	N/A
Majority		4,764	8.1	−4.2
Turnout		58,941	84.8	+2.3
Conservative hold		Swing	−2.1	

=== Elections in the 1980s ===
General election 1987: Bury North
Party	Candidate	Votes	%	±%
Conservative	Alistair Burt	28,097	50.1	+4.6
Labour	David Crausby	21,186	37.8	−2.4
Liberal	David Vasmer	6,804	12.1	−2.3
Majority		6,911	12.3	+7.0
Turnout		56,087	82.5	+2.9
Conservative hold		Swing	+3.5	

General election 1983: Bury North
Party	Candidate	Votes	%	±%
Conservative	Alistair Burt	23,923	45.5	
Labour	Frank White	21,131	40.2	
Liberal	Elisabeth Wilson	7,550	14.4	
Majority		2,792	5.3	
Turnout		52,604	79.6	
Conservative win (new seat)				

== See also ==
- Parliamentary constituencies in Greater Manchester
