= James Daly (English politician) =

British politician (born 1976)

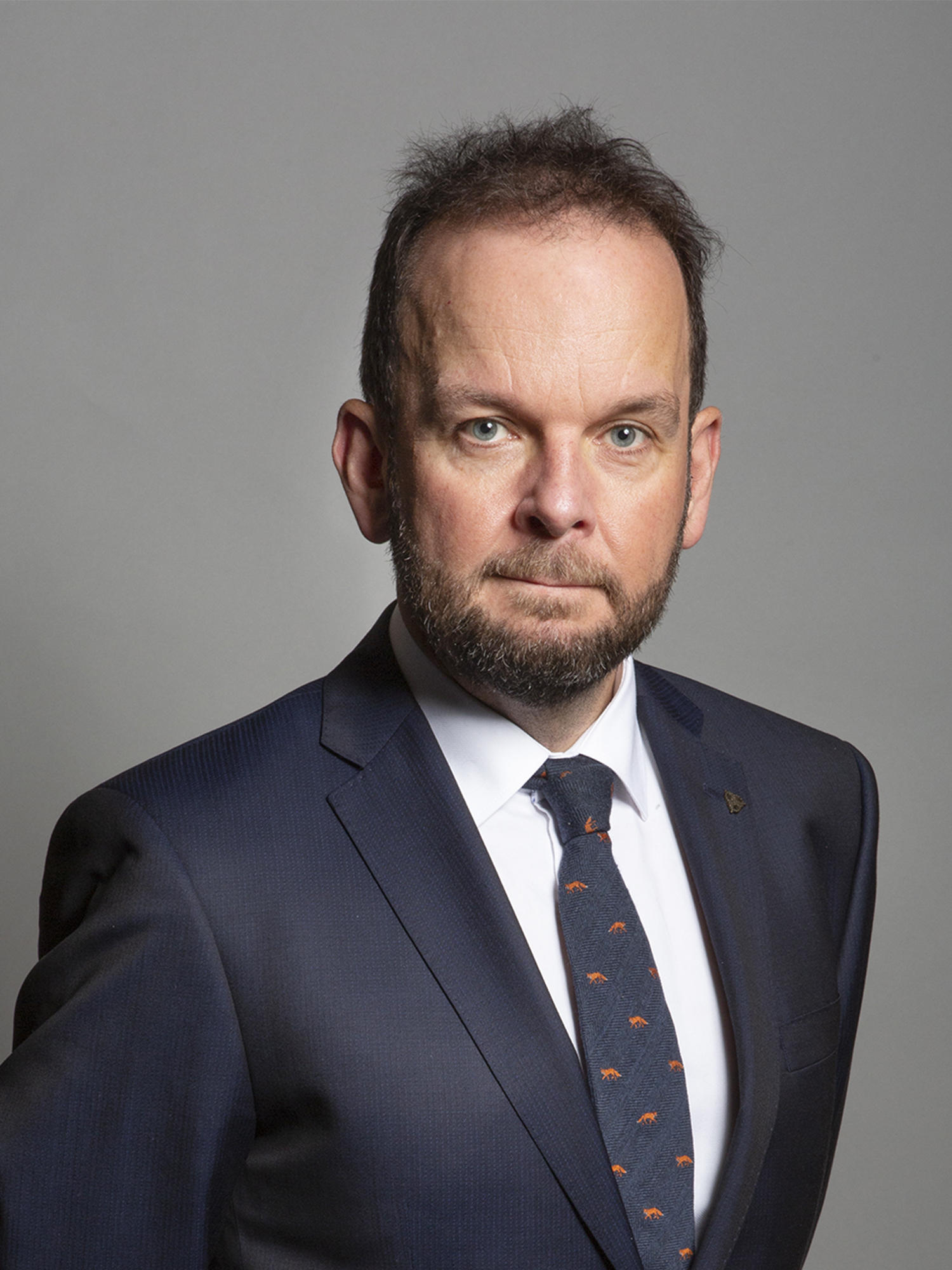
- Official portrait, 2019

Deputy Chairman of the Conservative Party
- In office 6 February 2024 – 5 July 2024
- Leader: Rishi Sunak
- Preceded by: Lee Anderson

Member of Parliament for Bury North
- In office 12 December 2019 – 30 May 2024
- Preceded by: James Frith
- Succeeded by: James Frith

Personal details
- Born: James Barry Daly; 19 March 1976 (age 50)
- Party: Conservative
- Education: Edge Hill University; University of Leeds

James Barry Daly (born 19 March 1976) is a British politician who served as the Deputy Chairman of the Conservative Party from February to July 2024. He served as the Member of Parliament (MP) for Bury North from 2019 to 2024.

== Early life ==
Daly studied at Edge Hill College and then the University of Leeds. He practised criminal law as a defence solicitor in Greater Manchester for 16 years before becoming an MP.

== Political career ==
James was a councillor for Bury Council's North Manor ward from 2012 to 2019, and served as leader of the Conservative group on the council from 2017 to 2019. Daly stood in neighbouring Bolton North East at the 2015 and 2017 general elections, coming second with 32.8% and 42.2% of the vote respectively. He also stood at the 2015 Oldham West and Royton by-election, finishing third with 2,596 votes (9.4%).

At the 2019 general election, he stood in Bury North, where he won the seat from Labour incumbent James Frith with a majority of 0.2%, representing a swing of 4.7%. With a majority of 105 votes, it was the most marginal seat in England at the time of the election.

He is an advocate of the Down Syndrome Bill, which would recognise people with Down syndrome as a specific minority group.

In June 2022, Daly gave his full support to Boris Johnson during the Partygate scandal despite his constituents being "angry." He was further quoted: "As an MP I fully understand the strength of feeling [about Partygate revelations]. I'm not saying anybody's wrong, but I had to think about my role as MP for Bury North and what's going to benefit my constituents. I hope people will look at what we've delivered and say 'this is a government and these are Conservative MPs who’ve done what they said they would do'."

On 13 June 2022, Daly was appointed Parliamentary Private Secretary to the Department for Work and Pensions ministerial team. He resigned from his position on 6 July 2022 following the Chris Pincher scandal, amid the July 2022 United Kingdom government crisis.

In March 2022, WhatsApp messages revealed that Matt Hancock had backed a plan to threaten Daly into voting for key lockdown decisions during the COVID-19 pandemic in England.

In September 2023, Daly wrote in the Bury Times that Labour's proposal to add VAT onto fee paying schools was "deeply depressing." In the article he praised the state education system but said that: "I was state-educated and will be forever grateful to my teachers for providing me with an enriching educational journey that I still benefit from today. The choices I make in my life today are directly linked to the aspiration and skills that my teachers and family taught me. One of those choices is to send my son to a fee-paying school."

In December 2023 he said that most struggling children in his constituency are the "products of crap parents". He later defended his comments, saying that he wanted "to ensure those from most disadvantaged backgrounds have best chance to thrive and succeed".

In February 2024, Daly was appointed a deputy chair of Conservative Party. This was following the resignations of Lee Anderson and Brendan Clarke-Smith.

Parliament of the United Kingdom
Preceded by James Frith	Member of Parliament for Bury North; 2019–2024	Succeeded by James Frith
