= Mark Logan (politician) =

British politician (born 1984)

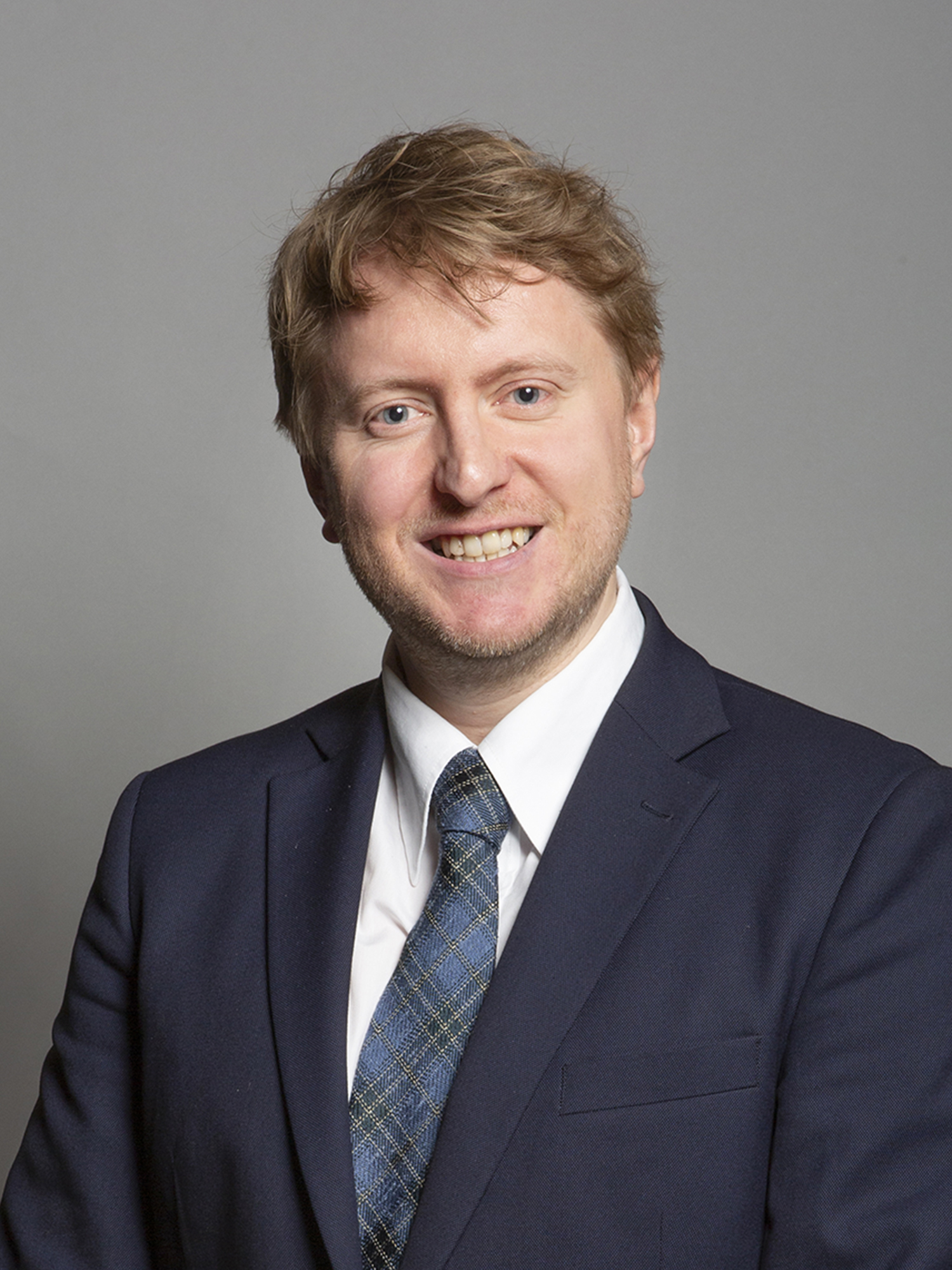

Member of Parliament for Bolton North East
- In office 12 December 2019 – 30 May 2024
- Preceded by: David Crausby
- Succeeded by: Kirith Entwistle

Personal details
- Born: Mark Rory Logan; 28 January 1984 (age 42) Ballymena, Northern Ireland
- Party: Labour (since 2024)
- Other political affiliations: Conservative (before 2024)
- Education: Queen's University Belfast (LLB); London School of Economics (MSc); Wadham College, Oxford (MSc)
- Website: Personal website

Mark Rory Logan (born 28 January 1984) is a former British politician. He served as a Conservative Member of Parliament (MP) for Bolton North East between 2019 and 2024, although he has since left the Conservatives and joined the Labour Party.

== Early life and career ==
Mark Logan was born and grew up in Ballymena in County Antrim. He graduated from Queen's University Belfast, and then earned two master's degrees, one from the London School of Economics and the second from Wadham College, Oxford. Before becoming an MP, he worked in the British Consulate-General in Shanghai as a locally engaged member of staff, where he was responsible for media and communications. Logan also worked for the Chinese conglomerate Sanpower Group; prior to that, he worked as a fundraiser for the University of Oxford.

== Political career ==
At the snap 2017 general election, Logan contested East Antrim for the Conservative Party, coming in sixth place with 2.5% of the vote, behind the incumbent DUP MP Sammy Wilson, Alliance's Stewart Dickson, the UUP's John Stewart, Sinn Féin's Oliver McMullan, and the SDLP candidate.

Logan was elected as MP for Bolton North East at the 2019 general election, winning with 45.4% of the vote and a majority of 378.

Logan is a campaigner for a direct train link from Bolton to London.

=== APPGs and Commons Select Committees ===
During his Parliamentary career, Logan was the Chair of All Party Parliamentary Group (APPG) on Afghanistan and Vice Chair of APPGs on British Council, China and Japan.

In 2024, Logan was amongst the delegation attending the 40th annual meeting of the UK-Japan 21st Century Group convened in Tokyo and Odawara, Kanagawa.

Logan served on the Science, Innovation and Technology Select Committee during the onset of the COVID-19 pandemic. The committee's work was central to scrutinising government and industries' response to the COVID-19 outbreak in the UK.

He is also a founding member of the Parliamentary Export Programme webinar series, which seeks to help local businesses increase international sales.

=== Parliamentary Private Secretary Career: 2022–2024 ===
Logan was appointed as Parliamentary Private Secretary to the Northern Ireland Office in March 2022. This was notable in that he was the only Northern Irish accent in the Conservative party and government of the day, the last being Brian Mawhinney in 2005. On King Charles III becoming the monarchy, Mark created a media storm by giving his Parliamentary oath in Ulster Scots.

He resigned on 6 July 2022 in protest at Boris Johnson's conduct in the Chris Pincher scandal, calling his position "almost impossible".

On 15 November 2022, Logan was appointed a Parliamentary Private Secretary (PPS) for the Department for Work and Pensions by Prime Minister, Rishi Sunak.

=== Resignation from the Conservative Party ===
On 30 May 2024 he announced he planned to vote for the Labour Party, citing ideological differences with the Conservative Party. He was not a candidate at the 2024 United Kingdom general election.

=== Foreign Policy and International Engagements ===
Of Conservative MPs, Logan was one of the most vocal since the outbreak of violence on October 7th 2023. In a House of Commons debate on Gaza, Logan quoted the ICC saying that "Israel has intentionally and systematically deprived the civilian population in all parts of Gaza of objects indispensable to human survival" and urged the British Government that "Never mind being on the right side of history; will we ensure that we are on the right side of the present?"

Logan is one of the leading experts in Chinese politics and UK-China relations within UK politics. He is a fluent speaker of Mandarin Chinese and also speaks some Shanghai dialect. Expanding on his Asia expertise, Logan is also currently learning Japanese.

Parliament of the United Kingdom
Preceded by Sir David Crausby	Member of Parliament for Bolton North East; 2019–2024	Succeeded by Kirith Entwistle
