= Jo Platt =

British politician (born 1973)

Jo Platt MP
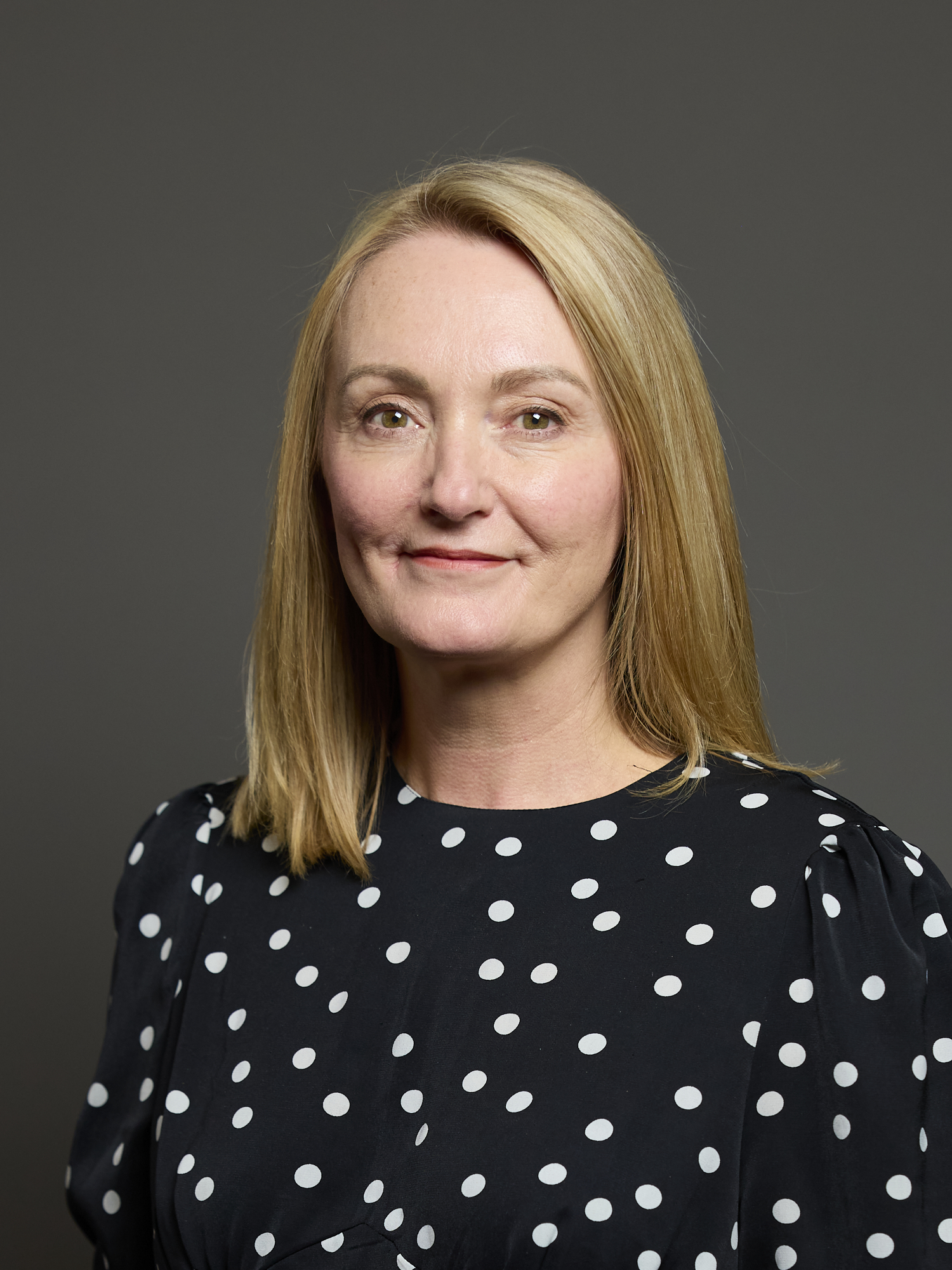
- Official portrait, 2024

Parliamentary Private Secretary to the Prime Minister
- Incumbent
- Assumed office 27 July 2026 Serving with David Baines & Sir Nic Dakin
- Prime Minister: Andy Burnham
- Preceded by: Abena Oppong-Asare; Jon Pearce; Catherine Fookes

Member of Parliament
- Incumbent
- Assumed office 4 July 2024
- Preceded by: Constituency established
- Constituency: Leigh and Atherton
- Majority: 8,881 (21.6%)
- In office 8 June 2017 – 6 November 2019
- Preceded by: Andy Burnham
- Succeeded by: James Grundy
- Constituency: Leigh

Member of Wigan Council for Astley Mosley Common
- In office 3 May 2012 – 6 September 2017
- Preceded by: Sean Ell
- Succeeded by: Paula Wakefield

Personal details
- Born: Joanne Marie Platt; 15 June 1973 (age 53) Salford, Lancashire, England
- Party: Labour Co-op
- Other political affiliations: Red Wall Caucus

Joanne Marie Platt (born 15 June 1973) is a British Labour and Co-operative politician who has served as the Member of Parliament (MP) for Leigh and Atherton since 2024. She was previously the MP for Leigh from 2017 to 2019.

== Education ==
Platt attended Bedford High School, Leigh.

== Political career ==
Platt was elected to Astley Mosley Common ward on Wigan Council at the 2012 local elections and re-elected in 2016. She was appointed as the Cabinet Member for Children and Young People in June 2014, and served as the Secretary of the Leigh Constituency Labour Party (CLP) during her tenure on the council. Platt resigned her council seat shortly after her election to Parliament in September 2017.

=== Parliamentary career ===
Platt was elected as the first female MP for Leigh at the 2017 general election, succeeding Andy Burnham, who stood down following his election as Greater Manchester Mayor. Upon her election, Platt advocated greater investment for post-industrial towns, restoring rail connectivity, increased local post-16 education provision and highlighting opportunities arising from devolution.

Platt was a brief member of the Environment, Food and Rural Affairs Committee in 2017, but sat on the Housing, Communities and Local Government Committee from 2017 to 2018.

Platt was appointed as the Parliamentary private secretary (PPS) to Angela Rayner, Shadow Education Secretary, in July 2017. She held the position until July 2018, when she was promoted to Shadow Minister for the Cabinet Office, focusing on cybersecurity, government digital projects, digital identity, outsourcing and government implementation. She criticised the Government's cybersecurity record in her role, and their handling of Huawei's involvement in the UK's 5G infrastructure. In March 2019, Platt advocated having a single Cybersecurity Minister and a government approach that facilitates the growth of the UK cyber sector in post-industrial towns. She also advocated the uptake of the cyber profession amongst those with neurodivergent conditions.

Platt set up and chaired the All Party Parliamentary Group on attention deficit hyperactivity disorder, informing and advising Ministers of the barriers those with ADHD face and the change that is required. In August 2018, she asked every clinical commissioning group (CCG) across the country what their average waiting time for ADHD diagnosis was, ultimately revealing some were waiting an average of two years for a diagnosis. She presented the findings to Prime Minister Theresa May during Prime Minister's Questions, securing a commitment from her to explore whether waiting times could be published to encourage a better diagnosis and treatment.

Platt lost her seat at the 2019 general election to the Conservative Party candidate, James Grundy. The result saw the largest 2017 majority for a party overturned in the country, and was the first time Labour had lost the seat since 1922.

After leaving Parliament, Platt worked for the charity Leigh Building Preservation Trust, at a local heritage site, Leigh Spinners, which is a Grade II* listed mill in the centre of Leigh. Platt was tasked with the management of renovating the building to house heritage, small business, enterprise, arts and culture. Whilst at Leigh Spinners Mill, she co-created a Co-operatives UK company, Leigh Spinners CBS, in order to drive further development for the site. Platt continues to campaign on local and national issues such as Long COVID, after contracting the virus in March 2020.

In 2022, Platt was selected as the prospective parliamentary candidate for Leigh and Atherton at the 2024 general election, and was re-elected. Jo is a member of the following All Party Parliamentary Groups:

- Greater Manchester (Chair)
- Long Covid (Chair)
- ME (Chair)
- Inclusion and Nurture in Education (Officer)
- Women's Health (Officer)

She endorsed her constituency predecessor Andy Burnham in the 2026 Labour Party leadership election, who went to appoint her as his Parliamentary Private Secretary.

== Personal life ==
Platt has two children. She describes herself as neurodivergent, and as suffering from long COVID.

Parliament of the United Kingdom
| Preceded by Andy Burnham | Member of Parliament for Leigh; 2017–2019 | Succeeded by James Grundy |
| New constituency | Member of Parliament for Leigh and Atherton; 2024–present | Incumbent |
