= James Frith =

British politician (born 1977)

James Frith MP
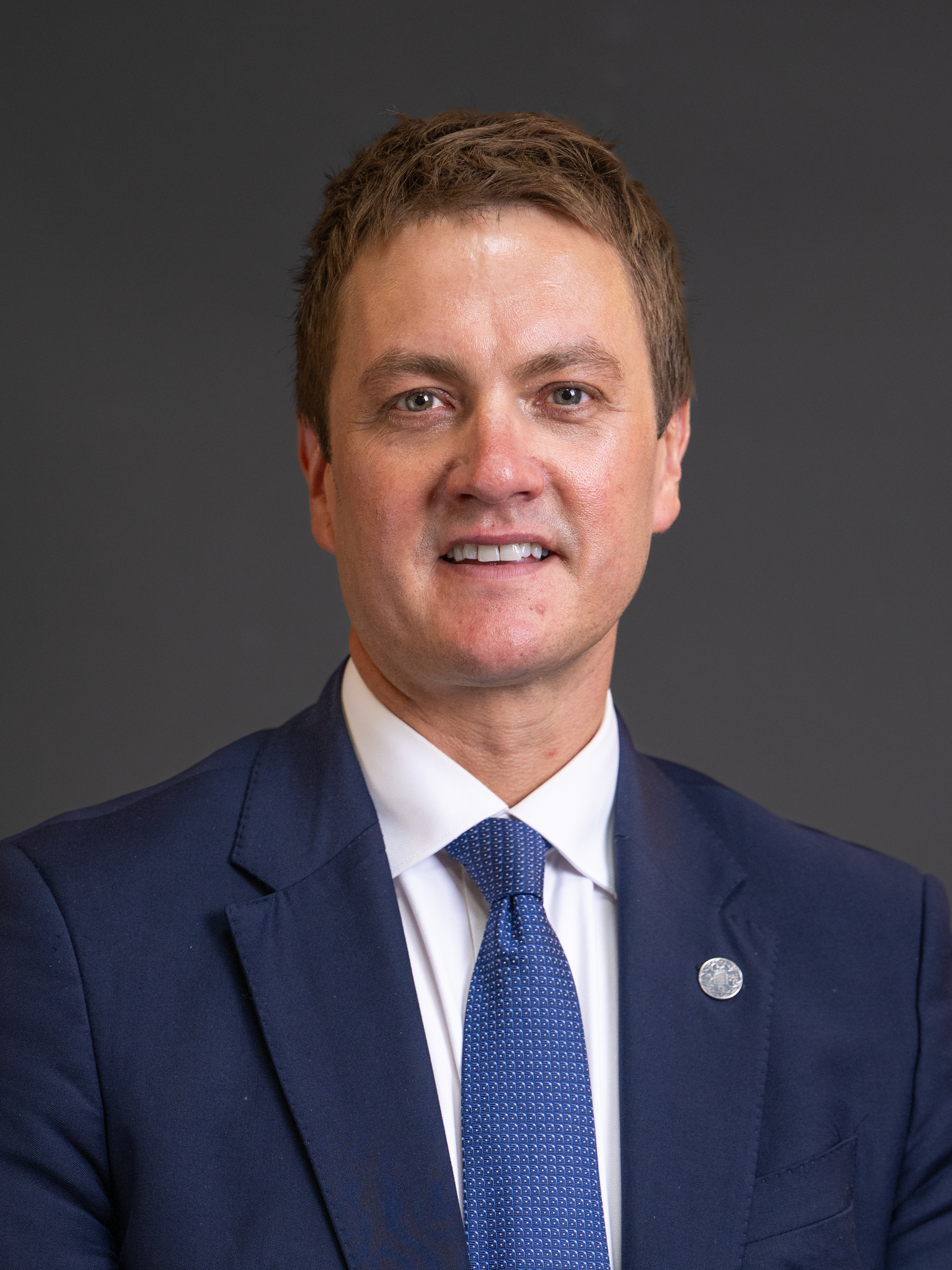
- Official portrait, 2025

Parliamentary Under-Secretary of State for Health Innovation
- Incumbent
- Assumed office 22 July 2026
- Prime Minister: Andy Burnham
- Preceded by: Preet Kaur Gill

Parliamentary Under-Secretary of State for Digital ID Parliamentary Secretary for the Cabinet Office
- In office 3 March 2026 – 22 July 2026
- Prime Minister: Keir Starmer
- Preceded by: Josh Simons
- Succeeded by: Office abolished

Member of Parliament for Bury North
- Incumbent
- Assumed office 4 July 2024
- Preceded by: James Daly
- Majority: 6,944 (15.2%)
- In office 8 June 2017 – 6 November 2019
- Preceded by: David Nuttall
- Succeeded by: James Daly

Member of Bury Council for Elton
- In office 5 May 2011 – 7 May 2015
- Preceded by: Denise Bigg
- Succeeded by: Michael Hankey

Personal details
- Born: James Richard Frith; 23 April 1977 (age 49) London, England
- Party: Labour
- Spouse: Nikki Frith
- Children: 4
- Parent: Richard Frith
- Education: Monkton Combe School; Taunton School; Manchester Metropolitan University (BA)

James Richard Frith (born 23 April 1977) is a British Labour Party politician who has been the Member of Parliament (MP) for Bury North since 2024. He was previously the MP from 2017 to 2019. Since 2026, Frith has served as Parliamentary Under-Secretary of State in the Department of Health and Social Care.

== Early life and career ==
Frith was born in London on 23 April 1977, the son of Richard Frith, who formerly served as Bishop of Hull and Bishop of Hereford. He was privately educated at both Monkton Combe School and Taunton School, and then studied Politics and Economics at Manchester Metropolitan University.

Frith was the lead singer in a rock band called Finka, and later another band, the Fusileers, performing nationwide at venues and festivals including Glastonbury.

During the 2005 General Election campaign, Frith worked as a Campaign and Communications Manager for the Labour Party and Ruth Kelly MP, then Secretary of State for Education.

Before his election to Parliament, Frith was the CEO and Founder of All Together, a social enterprise providing careers education and guidance services to young people to help them get into work.

== Political career ==
In the 2010 Bury Metropolitan Borough Council Election, Frith unsuccessfully stood as the Labour Party candidate for Elton ward against incumbent Conservative Michael Hankey. He successfully stood for Elton ward again in 2011, gaining the open seat from the Conservatives after disgraced incumbent Denise Bigg chose not to seek re-election. Frith became the first Labour councillor to represent the ward since 2002.

Frith sat on the Licensing Committee during his four-year term as a Councillor, and opted to run for Parliament rather than seek re-election.

After being selected as the Labour Party candidate in Bury North for the 2015 General Election, he was profiled by the Young Fabians during the 2015 General Election campaign for a pamphlet on prospective parliamentary candidates named 'Fifteen for 2015'. In the pamphlet, Frith said "I think [Blair] did more for ordinary people and families than any government since", but added New Labour “should have gone further and faster”. He lost to incumbent Conservative David Nuttall by 378 votes despite a swing to Labour.

Frith contributed to the Fabian Society's book Never Again: Lessons from Labour's Key Seats following his election defeat, criticising the leadership's 'failure to build on Labour's excellent record on enterprise and skills in government by engaging properly with the business community'.

He was re-selected to stand as the Labour candidate for Bury North in the 2017 General Election, fending off a challenge from high-profile candidate Karen Danczuk.

=== Parliamentary career ===
Frith was elected as Member of Parliament for Bury North in 2017, defeating incumbent Conservative David Nuttall with a majority of 4,375. He made his maiden speech on 19 July 2017 during the debate on tuition fees.

Frith was a member of the Education Select Committee from 2017 to 2019, and chaired the All-party parliamentary group for Hospice and End of Life Care. In May 2018, he was appointed as Parliamentary private secretary to John Healey, the Shadow Secretary of State for Housing.

He edited a book entitled New Brooms, published by the Fabian Society in 2018, featuring a collection of essays on parliamentary reform written by several Labour MPs from the 2017 intake.

In July 2019, Frith worked alongside UK Music to secure and lead a debate in Westminster Hall on the decline of music in education, during which he urged the government combat the crisis facing music in education.

He lost his seat in the 2019 General Election to James Daly, Bury Council's Conservative Group Leader, by 105 votes and conceded after three recounts. Following his defeat, Frith described feeling a "a degree of release" from the weeks campaigning, but added he felt the impact of being "inches from winning".

He was re-elected in the 2024 General Election to Bury North and was appointed Parliamentary Under-Secretary of State for Digital ID Government. In July 2026, he became Parliamentary Under-Secretary of State for Health Innovation.

=== Post-parliamentary activity ===
In an opinion piece for LabourList during the 2020 Labour Leadership Election, Frith invited all the candidates to visit his marginal constituency to better understand the seats they need to win. Also in the piece, he was critical of the party's 2019 General Election campaign for 'sending hundreds of activists to Tory seats that we had no hope of winning' and cautioned against creating a 'manifesto that nobody believes'.

Frith worked at Atticus Partners before re-entering parliament, a political lobbying and PR group.

== Personal life ==
Frith and his wife Nikki have been Bury residents since 2009, where they have raised their four children. He has spoken about the challenges of balancing family life whilst being a Member of Parliament.

Parliament of the United Kingdom
Preceded by David Nuttall	Member of Parliament for Bury North; 2017–2019	Succeeded by James Daly
Preceded by James Daly	Member of Parliament for Bury North; 2024–present	Incumbent
