= Herbert Griffiths =

Herbert Griffiths (14 April 1899 – 1 January 1969) was a British cinema organist, conductor, composer and arranger of concert, theatre and film music.

Griffiths was born in Southport, England. He studied organ at the Royal College of Music under Benjamin Lofthouse (1867-1948) and Herbert Frederick Ellingford (1876-1966), and music at Oxford University. He gained Associateship (ARCO) and Fellowship Diplomas (FRCO) from the Royal College of Organists.

Along with George Tootel, Reginald Foort and a few others, he was one of the earliest of the star cinema organists. In the early 1920s he became musical advisor to the theatre manager Oswald Stoll, and from 1923 until 1939 was music director of Stoll Theatres. He performed popular organ music for records and broadcasts in the late 1920s, sometimes on the organ of the Stoll Picture Theatre in London (on the site of what is now the Peacock Theatre). During the war he was Musical Advisor for South Eastern Command branch of the Department of National Service Entertainment (DNSE).

Earlier in his career Griffiths began composing concert works in traditional forms, such as the String Quartet in B minor (1920), as well as orchestral music, ballet music and songs (including the popular A Wayside Flower). But his work composing, arranging and conducting light operetta (and later film music) soon came to dominate his time. Waltzes from Vienna, a re-working of the 1930 operetta Walzer aus Wien with additional material by Griffiths and George H. Clutsam, was staged in London in 1931. The Viennese operetta A Kiss in Spring was originally composed by Emmerich Kálmán in 1930, but for the 1932 performances at the Alhambra Theatre in London Griffiths added to and reworked the score, with additional orchestrations by Constant Lambert, Arthur Wood, Alfred Reynolds and Walford Hyden. The choreography was by Frederick Ashton and the dancers included a young Alicia Markova as well as Harold Turner, Walter Gore and Prudence Hyman.

In 1934 Griffiths arranged the music of Schumann for The Golden Toy, with dances by Ninette De Valois. It ran for over three months at the London Coliseum. In 1937 he composed the music and conducted the orchestra for an ice skating and cabaret show titled St. Moritz – Ice Musical Spectacle, also at the Coliseum. In 1945-6 the Norman Ginsbury play The First Gentleman, starring Robert Morley and with music by Griffiths, was a big hit, running for 654 performances, initially at the New Theatre before transferring to the Savoy. However, when the play was made into a film in 1948, a new score by Lennox Berkeley was used.

His music work on films included Such Is the Law (1930), Black in the Face (1954), Five O'Clock Finish (1954), That's an Order (1955), Playground Express (1955), The Stripes of Sgt. Schweiger (1956) and The Baroness (1956).

He married Gwenda Lewis. They lived at 143 Horn Lane, Acton in the mid-1930s. By 1950 their address was 6, Leopold Road, Ealing Common. In the later 1950s they moved to Hove in East Sussex.
