= Waltzes from Vienna =

1934 film by Alfred Hitchcock

- Theatrical release poster
- Directed by: Alfred Hitchcock
- Screenplay by: Guy Bolton; Alma Reville
- Based on: Walzer aus Wien by Alfred Maria Willner; Heinz Reichert; Ernst Marischka
- Produced by: Tom Arnold
- Starring: Esmond Knight; Jessie Matthews; Edmund Gwenn; Fay Compton
- Cinematography: Glen MacWilliams
- Music by: Hubert Bath; Julius Bittner; Erich Wolfgang Korngold; Louis Levy
- Production companies: Gaumont British; Tom Arnold Films
- Distributed by: Gaumont British
- Release date: March 7, 1934 (UK)
- Running time: 80 minutes
- Country: United Kingdom
- Language: English

Waltzes from Vienna is a 1934 British biographical film directed by Alfred Hitchcock, sometimes known as Strauss' Great Waltz. It was part of the cycle of operetta films made in Britain during the 1930s.

Hitchcock's film is based on the stage musical Waltzes from Vienna, which premiered in Vienna in October 1930. With a libretto by A. M. Willner, Heinz Reichert and Ernst Marischka, this stage production contains music by Johann Strauss I and Johann Strauss II, selected and arranged by Erich Wolfgang Korngold and Julius Bittner into discrete musical numbers. Hitchcock, however, did not include these musical numbers in his film. In addition, he changed the end of the story. In the stage musical, Resi, the baker's daughter, decides that her father's apprentice, Leopold, will make a more suitable husband than the composer, Schani (Johann Strauss II). By contrast, Hitchcock's film rendition ends with Resi and Schani declaring their love for each other.

== Plot ==
As firemen race towards a fire at Ebezeder's Café, Resi and Schani, upstairs in the café, are oblivious to the danger and lost in a love duet that concludes with Schani telling Resi that he has dedicated his newest song to her. At the same time, Schani's music attracts the attention of the Countess Helga von Stahl, who is shopping in the dressmaker's store next door. Schani and Resi's romantic interlude is interrupted by Leopold, a baker in Resi's father's café who is in love with Resi, as he awkwardly climbs up the ladder to save her. Schani and Leopold argue over who will save Resi from the fire, but Leopold eventually wins and hauls Resi over his shoulder and down the ladder, causing her to lose her skirt on the way. Resi races to the dressmaker's shop to get away from the laughter of the onlookers. Schani retrieves Resi's skirt and then stumbles into the dressmaker's in search of Resi, where he meets the Countess. When the Countess learns that Schani is an aspiring musician, she proposes that he set some of her verses to music. As the Countess offers Schani her card, Resi enters the room and becomes immediately suspicious of the Countess's intentions.

With the romantic triangle set up, the next scene sets up the conflict between Schani and his father. At orchestra rehearsal, in which Schani plays second violin under his father's baton, Schani gets himself in trouble when he insults his father's music to his stand partner. The elder Strauss overhears and demands that Schani perform one of his own compositions for the members of the orchestra. Strauss Sr. then ridicules his son's waltz and tells him he could never have a career as a composer, inciting Schani to quit the orchestra.

Excited by his newfound freedom and the commission from the Countess, Schani visits Resi at her father's bakery to tell her his news. Resi initially berates Schani and informs him that, if he wants to marry her, he will have to give up music and take over the bakery. However, when she reads the Countess's lyrics, she is drawn into the music, singing the opening of Frühlingsstimmen waltz to Schani. Their moment of composition is interrupted when Resi's father arrives to give Schani a tour of the bakery. As Schani and Ebezeder walk into the basement, a memorable and unusual scene of musical composition begins. While Schani looks around, the tune that Resi sang begins to evolve. Two men throwing bread back and forth inspire the second phrase of the melody; a man tossing croissants into a box creates the offbeat rhythm of the waltz. The rhythm of the dough mixing machine provides Schani with the second main theme of the first waltz. As he tells the begrudging Leopold to go faster, this second theme turns into the beginning of the second large section of piece, at which point Schani runs upstairs, exclaiming to Resi that he has finished the composition. He then rushes off to tell the Countess that he has composed the perfect waltz to accompany her verses.

Schani then plays the final measures of the waltz to the Countess. After he finishes, she kisses him and then apologizes profusely, explaining that she was overwhelmed by his wonderful music. Schani then plays the second section of the waltz while her hand rests possessively on his shoulder, which, through a dissolve, becomes Resi's hand. After thanking Resi for coming up with the phrase, Schani agrees to dedicate the song to her. As the scene fades away, the page with Schani's dedication to Resi flips up to reveal another page with the same title, but dedicated to the Countess.

The duplicitous dedication is discovered when Resi hears Schani and the Countess playing the waltz for the publisher, Anton Drexler. Schani runs after Resi to explain and they reconcile only when Schani tells her that he will give up his music to work in the bakery. However, Schani is clearly miserable in his new job and he fights with Resi when he receives an invitation from the Countess to attend St. Stephen's Festival. Resi tells Schani that, if he attends, it will mean the end of their relationship. Meanwhile, the Countess plots a ruse that will cause Strauss Sr. to be late for the festival so that Schani can take his father's place to conduct his new waltz.

As Schani conducts Frühlingsstimmen at the festival, all of the film's conflicts come to a climax. The Countess detains the elder Strauss by asking the dancers at the festival to play to his ego, requesting that he play his waltzes over and over for their pleasure in a back room. Strauss Sr. finally arrives to find that his son has taken his place, performing for an enthusiastic audience. Meanwhile, Resi laments that Schani betrayed her by coming to the festival at the Countess's command.

Following the performance, the elder Strauss angrily tells his son that he had not authorized the performance, as the Countess had led him to believe. Schani leaves the festival in confusion and the Countess follows him home where they share another kiss. However, the romantic moment is interrupted by the Count, who, upon learning where the Countess had gone, left the party in a rage. Resi arrives in time to sneak in the back and replace the Countess, who then walks back up the front stairs to surprise her husband, as the crowd outside hums Frühlingsstimmen Waltz.

== Cast ==
- Esmond Knight as Johann "Schani" Strauss, the Younger
- Jessie Matthews as Resi Ebezeder
- Edmund Gwenn as Johann Strauss, the Elder
- Fay Compton as Countess Helga von Stahl
- Frank Vosper as Prince Gustav
- Robert Hale as Ebezeder
- Marcus Barron as Anton Drexler
- Charles Heslop as Valet
- Betty Huntley-Wright as Lady's Maid
- Hindle Edgar as Leopold (uncredited)
- Sybil Grove as Mme. Fouchett (uncredited)
- Bill Shine as Carl (uncredited)
- Bertram Dench as Engine driver (uncredited)
- B. M. Lewis as Domeyer (uncredited)
- John Singer as Boy (uncredited)
- Cyril Smith as Secretary (uncredited)

== Production background ==
The film tells the story of the writing and performance of The Blue Danube. According to Hitchcock:

Waltzes from Vienna gave me many opportunities for working out ideas in the relation of film and music. Naturally every cut in the film was worked out on the script before shooting began. But more than that, the musical cuts were worked out too.

Hitchcock told François Truffaut that this film was the lowest ebb of his career. He only agreed to make it because he had no other film projects that year and wanted to stay working. He never made another film based on a musical.

== Influence ==
The comment to Truffaut mentioned above has not prevented film scholars from finding value in this unusual Hitchcock film, as they point to Waltzes from Vienna as the foundation for many revolutionary ideas that appeared in his more highly regarded films. For example, Jack Sullivan and David Schroeder both agree that Hitchcock used this film to explore the potential of the waltz, which he used as a musical device that carried sinister meaning or accompanied dangerous situations in films like The Lodger (1927), Shadow of a Doubt (1943), Strangers on a Train (1951), and Torn Curtain (1966). Schroeder also suggests that Waltzes from Vienna taught Hitchcock that "gradually building towards a familiar tune, from a murky beginning to the melody known to everyone, will have little dramatic effect" – an experiment that likely remained on his mind as he built the unfamiliar "Lisa" tune out of nothing in Rear Window (1954).

In "Family Plots: Hitchcock and Melodrama," Richard Ness positions Waltzes from Vienna as the beginning of a series of films dealing with public performances, including the Royal Albert Hall scenes in the two versions of The Man Who Knew Too Much (1934 and 1956) and the ballet performance in Torn Curtain (1966). Finally, Maurice Yacowar comments on Hitchcock's innovative representation of a female character in Resi, suggesting that "in this film for perhaps the first time Hitchcock gives the women the powers of will and mind. All the men are lapdogs, save for the bull-headed senior Strauss, and even his vanity renders him putty in the hands of the ladies".

Aside from the influence this film had on Hitchcock's other films, Waltzes from Vienna set the stage for Julien Duvivier’s Strauss biopic The Great Waltz (1938), which maintains the character of the baker's daughter from the original stage musical while focusing on Johann Strauss II's revolutionary inclinations and the creation of his popular operetta, Die Fledermaus.

== Preservation and home media ==
The original negative of the film is held in the BFI National Archive, along with several other nitrate film copies.

Waltzes from Vienna has been heavily bootlegged on home video. Despite this, licensed releases have appeared on DVD from Network Distributing in the UK and Universal in France.
