= Lisa Smart =

British politician

Lisa Smart MP
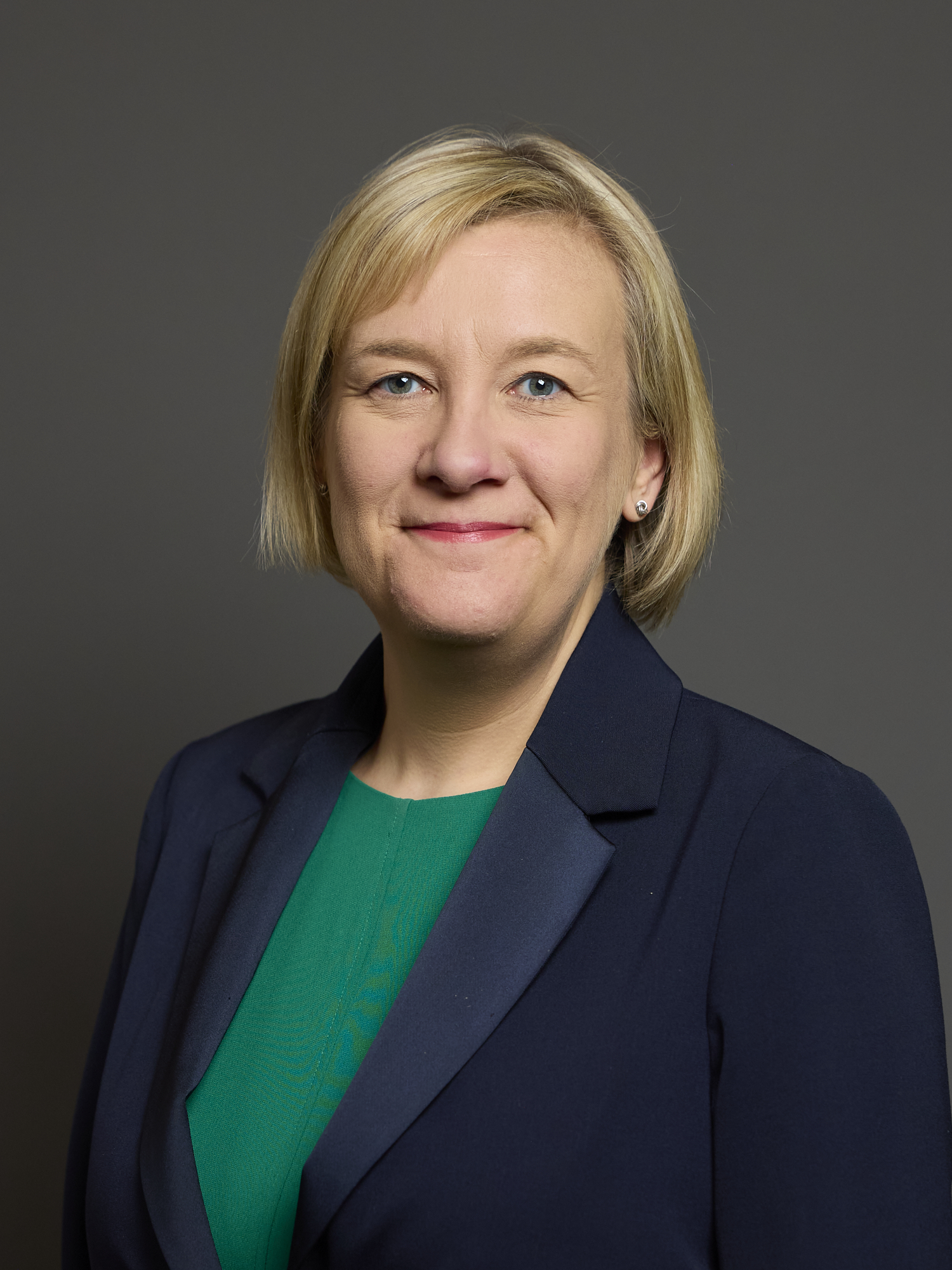
- Official portrait, 2024

Chair of the Liberal Democrats Parliamentary Party
- In office June 2024 – 9 September 2025
- Leader: Ed Davey
- Preceded by: Annette Brooke (2015)
- Succeeded by: Steff Aquarone

Member of Parliament for Hazel Grove
- Incumbent
- Assumed office 4 July 2024
- Preceded by: William Wragg
- Majority: 6,500 (14.1%)

Liberal Democrat portfolios
- 2024–2025: Home Affairs
- 2025: Women and Equalities
- 2025–present: Cabinet Office

Personal details
- Party: Liberal Democrats
- Education: Durham University; London Business School

Lisa Smart is a British Liberal Democrat politician who has served as Member of Parliament (MP) for Hazel Grove in Greater Manchester since 2024. She previously contested the seat in the 2015, 2017, and 2019 general elections. As of 2025, she is the Liberal Democrat Cabinet Office Spokesperson in the House of Commons.

== Early life ==
Smart grew up on Winston Avenue, in Lytham St Annes, and attended St Bede's Catholic High School, Lytham St Annes. Her grandmother was a Jewish refugee who fled the Nazis.

Smart graduated with a degree in mathematics from Durham University, and also holds an MBA from the London Business School.

According to her personal website, Smart has worked as a volunteer in her local community, "serving as a trustee for the New Horizons Canal Boat for disabled people and their carers in Marple, working as a volunteer for the Woodley & Romiley Towpath Team, and being a trustee of the Barrack Hill Education Trust."

== Political career ==
=== Early career ===
Smart lived in Wandsworth from 2001 and was the Liberal Democrat candidate for Merton and Wandsworth in the 2012 London Assembly election.

=== Stockport councillor (2016–24) ===
Smart served as a councillor on Stockport Metropolitan Borough Council, representing Bredbury Green and Romiley from 2016 to 2024. She was Deputy Leader of the Liberal Democrat group on Stockport Council until 2022, stepping down to concentrate on winning at the next general election.

After Andrew Stunell stood down as Liberal Democrat MP for Hazel Grove, Smart was selected as the candidate to contest the 2015 General Election, losing to Conservative William Wragg.

Smart stood again in 2017 and 2019, eventually gaining the seat in the 2024 general election.

=== Member of Parliament (2024–present) ===
One of the 72 Liberal Democrat MPs elected in the 2024 general election, Lisa Smart won Hazel Grove from the Conservatives. She was the first Liberal Democrat MP elected there since Andrew Stunell in 2010.

Historically being held by either the Liberal Democrats or the Conservatives, the 2024 general election saw the Labour Party come second for the first time in the seat's history.

General election 2024: Hazel Grove
Party	Candidate	Votes	%
Liberal Democrats	Lisa Smart	17,328	37.7
Labour	Claire Vibert	10,828	23.5
Conservative	Paul Athans	9,011	19.6
Reform	John Kelly	6,955	15.1
Green	Graham Reid	1,763	3.8
SDP	Tim O'Rourke	113	0.2
Majority		6,500	14.1
Turnout		45,998	63.2
Liberal Democrats win (new boundaries)			

During the 2024 election campaign, Smart was recorded joking that a person with a Liverpool accent who is not from the area was "nicking (stealing) stuff" while canvassing. The comment was criticised for reinforcing derogatory stereotypes about people from Liverpool.

Following her election to the House of Commons, Smart stood down as a Councillor in Stockport in September 2024.

Liberal Democrat leader Sir Ed Davey appointed Smart as Home Affairs spokesperson in September 2024. She was appointed the Women and Equalities Spokesperson after Christine Jardine was sacked from the office.

Parliament of the United Kingdom
Preceded by William Wragg	Member of Parliament for Hazel Grove; 2024–present	Incumbent
