= Bernard Sinclair =

French opera singer

Bernard Sinclair (1937 – 27 November 2015) was a French singer (baritone) particularly associated with the repertoire of the opéra comique and operetta, but also opera. He is also an actor, playwright and director. He died in the 10th arrondissement of Paris.

== Life ==
Sinclair was born in 1937, in Marcq-en-Barœul in the Nord department. He was first a medical student, before turning to a lyrical career, on the advice of Élie Delfosse, who was to become director of the Opéra de Nancy.

From the very beginning, he immediately took up the leading roles of opéra comique and operetta in provincial theatres. It is true that this seductive "baritone-martin" has a lot for him, a voice full of charm and radiant treble, a fine musicality, a physical youthful prime, joined to an elegance and a talent of comedian.

Paris discovered him in 1966 in La danseuse aux étoiles at the Théâtre Mogador. Very quickly he appeared at the Théâtre du Châtelet, the Théâtre du Palais-Royal, and the Opéra-Comique. There he sang a few roles of opéra comiques and opera.

== Repertory ==
Opera

- Frédéric in Lakmé,
- Mercutio in Faust,
- Escamillo in Carmen,
- Pelléas in Pelléas et Mélisande;

but above all the operetta repertoire in which he excelled particularly well, his favourite roles being: Franz Lehár's Paganini, Danilo in The Merry Widow, Der Zarewitsch, Brissac in Les Mousquetaires au couvent, Le Comte de Luxembourg, Goethe in Frédérique, Sou-Chong in The Land of Smiles, etc.

== Recordings ==
Throughout his career. he recorded numerous works, first for the lyrical service of the ORTF, and then for the recording house EMI, in particular La Fille de madame Angot, Les Cloches de Corneville, and Walzer aus Wien, with Mady Mesplé.

== New career on stage ==
Over the past few years, he has approached several classic roles (Le Cid), created (Tessa, la nymphe au cœur fidèle), created and directed his own play, Les Mouettes d' Étretat, in which he plays the lead role of an old prisoner tyrannized by his cellmate at the Théâtre du Nord-Ouest. At the beginning of 2014, he produced and played Maille à partir, a text created for him by Christian Morel de Sarcus, at Le Guichet Montparnasse.

== Actor ==
- 2014: Pierre Corneille's Le Cid, directed by Jean-Luc Jeener, Théâtre du Nord-Ouest, Le Mois Molière Versailles, Yvelines.
- 2013: Les Mouettes d'Étretat by Bernard Sinclair, directed by Bernard Sinclair, Théâtre du Nord-Ouest.

== Theatre direction ==
- 2014: Jean Giraudoux's Tessa, la nymphe au cœur fidèle, Théâtre du Nord-Ouest
- 2013: Les Mouettes d'Étretat by Bernard Sinclair, Théâtre du Nord-Ouest
