= Naughty Cinderella =

1933 British comedy film

- Winna Winifried and John Stuart in the film
- Directed by: Jean Daumery
- Written by: Scott Darling; Randall Faye
- Produced by: Irving Asher
- Starring: John Stuart; Winna Winifried; Betty Huntley-Wright
- Cinematography: Basil Emmott
- Production company: Warner Brothers-First National Productions
- Distributed by: Warner Bros.
- Release date: January 1933
- Running time: 56 minutes
- Country: United Kingdom
- Language: English

Naughty Cinderella is a 1933 British comedy film directed by Jean Daumery and starring John Stuart, Winna Winifried and Betty Huntley-Wright. It was produced as a quota quickie by Warner Bros. at the company's Teddington Studios in London.

== Preservation status ==
The British Film Institute National Archive holds a collection of stills but no film or video materials.

== Plot ==
Danish schoolgirl Brita Rasmussen, the ward of wealthy young Englishman Michael Wynard, is annoyed that she must remain at finishing school for another year. When she eventually arrives in England she decides to play a trick on Michael and dresses as a tomboy as in an old photograph, but meets him at night dressed as an adult and looking like a different person. This double life continues until her secret is revealed by Michael's housekeeper.

== Cast ==
- John Stuart as Michael Wynard
- Winna Winifried as Brita Rasmusson
- Betty Huntley-Wright as Elinore
- Marion Gerth as Elsa
- Marie Wright as Mrs Barrow
- Victor Fairley as Herr Amsel
- Catherine Watts as Clara Field

== Reception ==
The Daily Film Renter wrote: "Ingenious light comedy story of dual personality, with vein of romance running through it. Winna Winfried in first starring role scores personal success in rather improbable story. Sound and photography good and continuity smooth."

Picture Show wrote: "Ingenuous and unsubtle story of a Danish girl who pretends to be a spectacled tomboy to fool her dashing young guardian, and also appears as her bewitching self as the schoolgirl's 'friend.' When he discovers her deception, the young man sets out to teach her a lesson. The new star, Winna Winfried, is both promising and charming."
