= Little Miss Nobody (1933 film) =

- A. Bromley Davenport, Ben Field, Drusilla Wills, Sebastian Shaw, Winna Winifried and Alice O'Day in the film
- Directed by: John Daumery
- Produced by: Irving Asher
- Starring: Winna Winifried; Sebastian Shaw; Betty Huntley-Wright
- Cinematography: Basil Emmott
- Production company: Warner Brothers
- Distributed by: Warner Brothers
- Release date: February 1933
- Running time: 52 minutes
- Country: United Kingdom
- Language: English

Little Miss Nobody is a 1933 British comedy film directed by John Daumery and starring Winna Winifried, Sebastian Shaw, Drusilla Wills, and Betty Huntley-Wright. It was written by Irving Asher and was a quota quickie made at Teddington Studios by the British subsidiary of Warner Brothers.

== Preservation status ==
The British Film Institute National Archive holds a collection of stills but no film or video materials.

== Plot summary ==
Karen Bergen is a Danish girl with acting ambitions, and travels to London, staying in theatrical digs. Initially unsuccessful on the stage, her fellow boarders put her up in a top hotel, and she claims to be a foreign film star on her way to Hollywood. British film executives, however, do not fall for it.

== Cast ==
- Winna Winifried as Karen Bergen
- Sebastian Shaw as Pat Carey
- Betty Huntley-Wright as Tilly
- A. Bromley Davenport as Mr Romary
- Drusilla Wills as Birdie May
- Alice O'Day as Mrs Merridew
- Ben Field as Sam Brightwell
- Ernest Sefton as Mr Morrison
- Abraham Sofaer as Mr Beal

== Reception ==
Film Weekly wrote: "Although the idea is fairly novel and moderately plausible, neither the acting nor the direction is strong enough to support it. The result is just fair entertainment of a very artless kind."

Picturegoer wrote: "Transparently thin story of a Danish girl who comes to England to go on the stage and is forced into the limelight by publicity man and his actor friends. It is all exceptionally ingenuous and will appeal only to the wholly unsophisticated. The one redeeming point is Winna Winfried's charming poise and personality. Given a better chance she should go far."

The Daily Film Renter wrote: "Unconvincing and incredibly trivial story of Danish girl who is 'launched' as a film star by ludicrous publicity stunt. Mediocre direction fails to invest ridiculous narrative with vestige of interest, while uninspired cast hardly help matters. Banal dialogue and 'contrived' situations. Indifferent offering for the very uncritical."
