= Betty Huntley-Wright =

British actress and vocalist (1911–1993)

Betty Huntley-Wright (3 December 1911 – 27 May 1993) was a British actress and vocalist. Daughter of the comic actor Huntley Wright, she had a long career on stage, chiefly in comedy and pantomime, and in film, radio and television. Later, she also ran an antiques business in London.

== Biography ==
=== Early years ===
Huntley-Wright was born Betty Jessie Wright in Hampstead, London, one of three children of the comic actor Huntley Wright and his wife, the actress Mary Fraser. She was educated at Hampstead High School and studied for the stage under Julian Kimbell (singing), Anton Dolin and the Cone School (dancing). She made her first appearance on the stage at the Regent Theatre, Kings Cross, London, in 1928, as Chris Haversham in The Eye of Siva, and her first appearance in the West End, at His Majesty's Theatre in July 1929, as Freda in Noël Coward's operetta Bitter Sweet.

=== Acting career ===
In the early 1930s, Huntley-Wright performed in comedies and operetta in London and on tour. In 1933 she played Madeleine in a revival of Madame Pompadour, in which her father had made a great success in 1923. In the mid-1930s she extended the range of her career, playing an English and French season in Paris in 1935, and building up a repertoire of principal boy roles in pantomimes, including Jack in Jack and the Beanstalk (1934) and Aladdin in Aladdin (1939). From 1939 to 1942 she was a member of the BBC Repertory Company, formed to broadcast drama from studios away from London and wartime bombing. In 1942 she toured in Baby Mine and appeared again as Aladdin. Two years later, she was touring with the Carl Rosa Opera Company as Olympia, the doll, in The Tales of Hoffmann.

Huntley-Wright's post-war engagements continued to feature annual pantomimes and comedies in London and on tour. In 1957 she took over the part of Madame Dubonnet in the long-running musical The Boy Friend.

In films, Huntley-Wright's career started in 1933 with Naughty Cinderella and Little Miss Nobody. At the end of the war, she made further films, including Meet Sexton Blake! (1945), The First Gentleman (1948) Just Joe (1960), Carry On Loving (1970; part of the Carry On series), and many television appearances in a wide range of roles from Alice Ford in The Merry Wives of Windsor to roles in Bulldog Breed, Steptoe and Son, Softly, Softly, Fawlty Towers (as Mrs Twitchen in the episode titled "Gourmet Night") and All Gas and Gaiters.

=== Personal life ===
Huntley-Wright was twice married and twice divorced. Her first husband was the French actor-manager Claude Sainval (original name: Claude McConnel). Her second was the British actor John Arnatt.

Together with her daughter, the actress Bridget McConnel, Huntley-Wright developed her interest in antique thimbles into a business, forming a collectors club, the Thimble Society of London, in 1981. They also ran a small antiques business in London, trading at various times in the West End, Portobello Road and Chelsea.

She died of heart disease in Camden, London, in 1993, at the age of 81.

== Selected filmography ==
- Little Miss Nobody (1933)
- Waltzes from Vienna (1934)
- The Last Waltz (1936)
- Meet Sexton Blake! (1945)
- The First Gentleman (1948)
- Just Joe (1960)
- Carry On Loving (1970; part of the Carry On series)
