= Tom Arnold (theatre impresario) =

British theatre producer (1897–1969)

- Tom Arnold, King of Pantomime
- Born: Tom Arnold; 1897; Settle, Yorkshire, England
- Died: 2 February 1969 (aged 71–72); London, England
- Resting place: Golders Green Crematorium
- Occupation: Theatrical producer

Tom Arnold, OBE (1897 – 2 February 1969) was a theatrical producer in the United Kingdom.

Born in Yorkshire, Thomas Charles Arnold spent much of his life travelling, although he considered Brighton to be his second home. His business activities were extensive, and included opera, classical plays, films, revues, American rodeo and variety, ice spectaculars and circuses. He had interests in seaside piers and pleasure steamers and controlled the Ice Palace in Brighton. One of the most versatile and successful theatrical businessmen of his day, his empire extended to the continent and South Africa. He started in the theatre world shortly after the First World War, as a promoter and manager of touring revues seen mainly in provincial theatres and music halls.

When Julian Wylie died suddenly in December 1934, he had several Pantomime productions ongoing, and they were taken over by Arnold.

Arnold staged his first London pantomime in 1937, a production of Aladdin. He made at least one venture into Shakespeare with a production casting Ivor Novello as Henry V at Drury Lane in 1938. He also produced films in which George Formby appeared, and produced the Alfred Hitchcock movie Waltzes from Vienna (1934).

He is remembered in particular for his ice shows and circuses, some at the Stoll Theatre in Kingsway. Some of the most lavish and expensive ice shows ever produced were shown at Harringay Arena and the Wembley Arena. Harringay Arena was also home to his circus productions from 1947 to 1958.

Dubbed the King of Pantomime, it is perhaps his staging of pantomimes for which he is best remembered. In the year he died he was responsible for the production of fifteen pantomimes with a total cost of half a million pounds. He claimed to have staged 400 pantomimes in his lifetime.

He left a widow Helen, daughter Louise and a son Tom who became a Conservative Member of Parliament for Hazel Grove (1974-1997).
