= Hazel Grove (constituency) =

UK Parliament constituency (since 1974)

Coordinates: 53°22′N 2°07′W

- County constituency for the House of Commons
- Interactive map of boundaries since 2024
- Location within North West England
- County: Greater Manchester
- Electorate: 72,941 (March 2020)
- Major settlements: Bredbury, Romiley, Hazel Grove, Marple and Offerton

Current constituency
- Created: 1974
- Member of Parliament: Lisa Smart (Liberal Democrats)
- Seats: One
- Created from: Cheadle

Hazel Grove is a constituency (Note: A county constituency (for the purposes of election expenses and type of returning officer)) in Greater Manchester represented in the House of Commons of the UK Parliament since 2024 by Lisa Smart of the Liberal Democrats. (Note: As with all constituencies, the constituency elects one Member of Parliament (MP) by the first past the post system of election at least every five years.)

== Constituency profile ==
Hazel Grove is a constituency located on the outskirts of Greater Manchester within the Metropolitan Borough of Stockport. It is named after the large village of Hazel Grove and also contains the Stockport neighbourhoods of Offerton and Bosden Farm, the town of Bredbury and its connected villages of Woodley and Romiley, the town of Marple and the village of High Lane. The east of the constituency past Marple borders Derbyshire and the High Peak constituency.

Much of the area was developed during the early 20th century as suburban residential neighbourhoods serving Stockport's large textile industry. Bredbury also has a history of coal mining. The constituency overall has average levels of wealth; there is some deprivation in the areas close to Stockport town centre whilst Marple and Hazel Grove itself are affluent. House prices in the constituency are higher than the rest of North West England but lower than the national average.

Marple, on the outskirts of the constituency, on the border with the Peak District

In general, residents of the constituency are older and have high rates of homeownership. Levels of education and income are higher than the surrounding region and similar to the rest of the country. A high proportion of residents work in the retail and construction industries, and also in professional and scientific occupations. White people made up 94% of residents at the 2021 census. At the local borough council, most of the constituency is represented by Liberal Democrats whilst Offerton and Bredbury elected Labour Party councillors. An estimated 52% of residents supported leaving the European Union in the 2016 referendum, identical to the nationwide figure.

== Boundaries ==
=== Historic ===
1974–1983: The Urban Districts of Bredbury and Romiley, Hazel Grove and Bramhall, and Marple.

From 1 April 1974 until the next boundary review came into effect for the 1983 general election, the constituency comprised parts of the Metropolitan Borough of Stockport in Greater Manchester, but its boundaries were unchanged.

1983–2010: The Metropolitan Borough of Stockport wards of Bredbury, Great Moor, Hazel Grove, Marple North, Marple South and Romiley.

Bramhall was transferred back to Cheadle. The Great Moor ward, incorporating the community of Offerton, was transferred from the abolished Stockport South constituency.

2010–2024: The Metropolitan Borough of Stockport wards of Bredbury and Woodley, Bredbury Green and Romiley, Hazel Grove, Marple North, Marple South and High Lane, and Offerton.

Boundaries adjusted to take account of revision of local authority wards.

=== Current ===
Further to the 2023 review of Westminster constituencies which came into effect for the 2024 general election, the constituency was expanded to bring the electorate within the permitted range by transferring from Stockport the Manor ward (as it existed on 1 December 2020).

Following a local government boundary review which came into effect in May 2023, the constituency now comprises the following wards or part wards of the Metropolitan Borough of Stockport from the 2024 general election:

- Bredbury & Woodley; Bredbury Green & Romiley; Hazel Grove (virtually all); Manor; Marple North; Marple South & High Lane; Norbury & Woodsmoor (part); Offerton (part).

== Political history ==
Along with the neighbouring constituency of Cheadle, Hazel Grove has usually been a marginal contest between the Conservative Party and Liberal-affiliated candidates.

In its first election in February 1974, the seat was won by Michael Winstanley of the Liberal Party, who had been the MP for Cheadle between 1966 and 1970. Winstanley only held it for a few months because, at the general election in October 1974, he lost to the Conservatives' Tom Arnold.

Arnold held the seat until 1997, although (with the exception of the 1979 election) this was with small majorities over the local Liberals/SDP-Liberal Alliance/Liberal Democrats' candidate. At the 1997 general election, Arnold stood down and the seat was taken by Andrew Stunell of the Liberal Democrats. Stunell held the seat until his retirement in 2015, although with reduced majorities.

The Conservative share of the vote fell in Hazel Grove in both the 2001 and 2005 general elections, from a (winning) peak under Tom Arnold of 44.8% in 1992 to a low of 29.7% in 2005. Following three failed attempts to increase the share of the vote (1997, 2001 and 2005), this decline was reversed in the 2010 election by Annesley Abercorn, who achieved a 33.6% share of the vote (+3.9%) and a 2.4% swing from the Liberal Democrats to the Conservatives.

In 2015, Conservative William Wragg captured the seat with a majority of 15.8% on a swing of 15.2%. He retained the seat at the 2017 and 2019 elections, albeit with slightly reduced majorities. Wragg stood down for the 2024 election, having resigned the Conservative Party whip earlier in the year. Subsequently the seat was taken for the Liberal Democrats by Lisa Smart at her fourth attempt, with Labour moving into second place in the seat for the first time, the Conservatives dropping into third.

== Members of Parliament ==
Election	Member	Party	Notes
February 1974	Michael Winstanley	Liberal	Member for Cheadle (1966–1970)
October 1974	Tom Arnold	Conservative	
1997	Andrew Stunell	Liberal Democrats	Under-Secretary of State for Communities and Local Government (2010–2012)
2015	William Wragg	Conservative	
2024	William Wragg	Independent	
2024	Lisa Smart	Liberal Democrats	

== Elections ==
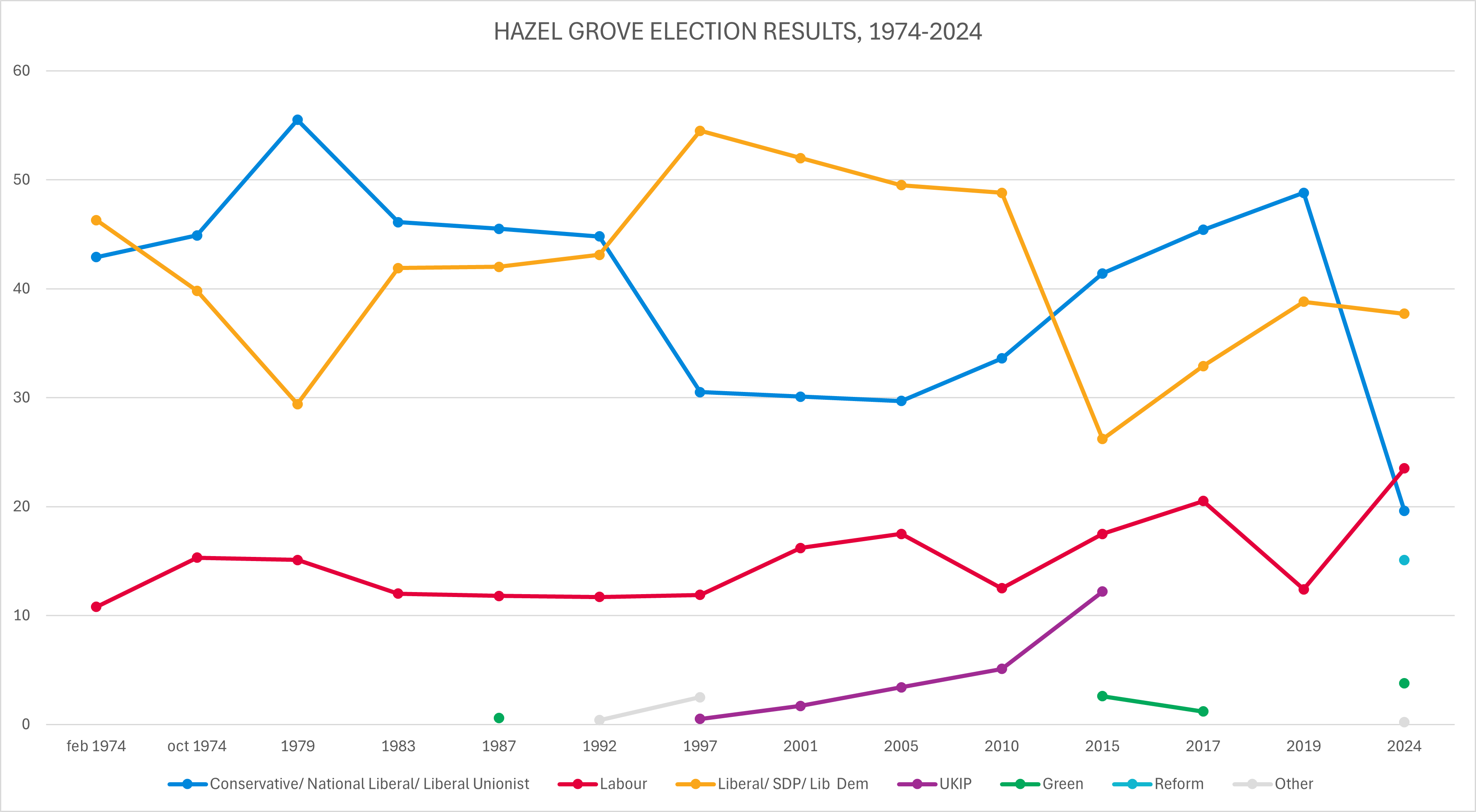
Election results 1983-2024

=== Elections in the 2020s ===
General election 2024: Hazel Grove
Party	Candidate	Votes	%	±%
Liberal Democrats	Lisa Smart	17,328	37.7	+0.5
Labour	Claire Vibert	10,828	23.5	+7.2
Conservative	Paul Athans	9,011	19.6	−26.0
Reform	John Kelly	6,955	15.1	+14.5
Green	Graham Reid	1,763	3.8	+3.5
SDP	Tim O'Rourke	113	0.2	N/A
Rejected ballots		170		
Majority		6,500	14.1	N/A
Turnout		45,998	63.2	–6.1
Registered electors		72,843		–0.1
Liberal Democrats gain from Conservative		Swing	+13.2	

Changes are from the notional 2019 results on the 2024 boundaries. Swing shown is Con to LD as the Con were previous incumbents, despite falling to third place.

=== Elections in the 2010s ===
2019 notional result
Party	Vote	%
Conservative	22,994	45.6
Liberal Democrats	18,775	37.2
Labour	8,208	16.3
Brexit Party	310	0.6
Green	154	0.3
Turnout	50,441	69.2
Electorate	72,941	

General election 2019: Hazel Grove
Party	Candidate	Votes	%	±%
Conservative	William Wragg	21,592	48.8	+3.4
Liberal Democrats	Lisa Smart	17,169	38.8	+5.9
Labour	Tony Wilson	5,508	12.4	—8.1
Majority		4,423	10.0	—2.5
Turnout		44,269	67.6	—2.3
Registered electors		63,346		+1.0
Conservative hold		Swing	–1.3	

General election 2017: Hazel Grove
Party	Candidate	Votes	%	±%
Conservative	William Wragg	20,047	45.4	+4.0
Liberal Democrats	Lisa Smart	14,533	32.9	+6.7
Labour	Nav Mishra	9,036	20.5	+3.0
Green	Robbie Lee	516	1.2	−1.4
Majority		5,514	12.5	−3.1
Turnout		44,132	69.9	+1.4
Registered electors		62,684		–0.7
Conservative hold		Swing	−1.4	

General election 2015: Hazel Grove
Party	Candidate	Votes	%	±%
Conservative	William Wragg	17,882	41.4	+7.8
Liberal Democrats	Lisa Smart	11,330	26.2	−22.6
Labour	Michael Taylor	7,584	17.5	+5.0
UKIP	Darran Palmer	5,283	12.2	+7.1
Green	Graham Reid	1,140	2.6	N/A
Majority		6,552	15.8	N/A
Turnout		42,759	68.5	+1.9
Registered electors		63,098		+0.0
Conservative gain from Liberal Democrats		Swing	+15.2	

General election 2010: Hazel Grove
Party	Candidate	Votes	%	±%
Liberal Democrats	Andrew Stunell	20,485	48.8	−0.7
Conservative	Annesley Abercorn	14,114	33.6	+3.9
Labour	Richard Scorer	5,234	12.5	−5.0
UKIP	John Whittaker	2,148	5.1	+1.8
Majority		6,371	15.2	−4.6
Turnout		41,981	66.6	+5.2
Registered electors		63,074		–2.1
Liberal Democrats hold		Swing	−2.4	

=== Elections in the 2000s ===
General election 2005: Hazel Grove
Party	Candidate	Votes	%	±%
Liberal Democrats	Andrew Stunell	19,355	49.5	−2.5
Conservative	Alan White	11,607	29.7	−0.4
Labour	Andrew Graystone	6,834	17.5	+1.3
UKIP	Keith Ryan	1,321	3.4	+1.7
Majority		7,748	19.8	−1.9
Turnout		39,117	60.8	+1.7
Registered electors		64,376		−1.1
Liberal Democrats hold		Swing	−1.0	

General election 2001: Hazel Grove
Party	Candidate	Votes	%	±%
Liberal Democrats	Andrew Stunell	20,020	52.0	−2.5
Conservative	Nadine Bargery	11,585	30.1	−0.4
Labour	Martin Miller	6,230	16.2	+4.3
UKIP	Gerald Price	643	1.7	+1.1
Majority		8,435	21.9	–2.0
Turnout		38,478	59.1	−18.4
Registered electors		65,107		+2.2
Liberal Democrats hold		Swing	–1.0	

=== Elections in the 1990s ===
General election 1997: Hazel Grove
Party	Candidate	Votes	%	±%
Liberal Democrats	Andrew Stunell	26,883	54.5	+11.4
Conservative	Brendan Murphy	15,069	30.5	−14.3
Labour	Jeffrey Lewis	5,882	11.9	+0.2
Referendum	John Stanyer	1,055	2.1	N/A
UKIP	Gordon Black	268	0.5	N/A
Humanist	Douglas Firkin-Flood	183	0.4	N/A
Majority		11,814	24.0	N/A
Turnout		49,340	77.3	
Registered electors		63,694		–1.0
Liberal Democrats gain from Conservative		Swing	+12.9	

General election 1992: Hazel Grove
Party	Candidate	Votes	%	±%
Conservative	Tom Arnold	24,479	44.8	−0.7
Liberal Democrats	Andrew Stunell	23,550	43.1	+1.1
Labour	Colin MacAllister	6,390	11.7	−0.1
Natural Law	Michael Penn	204	0.4	N/A
Majority		929	1.7	−1.8
Turnout		54,623	84.9	+3.3
Registered electors		64,302		–2.2
Conservative hold		Swing	−0.9	

=== Elections in the 1980s ===
General election 1987: Hazel Grove
Party	Candidate	Votes	%	±%
Conservative	Tom Arnold	24,396	45.5	−0.5
Liberal	Andrew Vos	22,556	42.0	+0.1
Labour	Glyn Ford	6,354	11.8	−0.2
Green	Freda Chapman	346	0.6	N/A
Majority		1,840	3.5	−0.6
Turnout		53,652	81.6	+4.4
Registered electors		65,717		+3.2
Conservative hold		Swing	−0.2	

General election 1983: Hazel Grove
Party	Candidate	Votes	%	±%
Conservative	Tom Arnold	22,627	46.1	–4.9
Liberal	Andrew Vos	20,605	41.9	+14.5
Labour	Jonathan Comyn-Platt	5,895	12.0	–9.4
Majority		2,022	4.1	–19.4
Turnout		49,127	77.2	
Registered electors		63,630		
Conservative hold		Swing	–9.7	

=== Elections in the 1970s ===
1979 notional result
Party	Vote	%
Conservative	25,596	51.0
Liberal	13,781	27.4
Labour	10,747	21.4
Others	98	0.2
Turnout	50,222	
Electorate		

General election 1979: Hazel Grove
Party	Candidate	Votes	%	±%
Conservative	Tom Arnold	32,420	55.5	+10.6
Liberal	Viv Bingham	17,148	29.4	−10.5
Labour	John Lowe	8,846	15.1	−0.2
Majority		15,272	26.1	+21.1
Turnout		58,414	83.4	+1.1
Registered electors		70,005		+3.4
Conservative hold		Swing	+10.5	

General election October 1974: Hazel Grove
Party	Candidate	Votes	%	±%
Conservative	Tom Arnold	25,012	44.9	+2.0
Liberal	Michael Winstanley	22,181	39.8	−6.5
Labour	Allan Roberts	8,527	15.3	+4.5
Majority		2,831	5.1	N/A
Turnout		55,720	82.4	−4.5
Registered electors		67,648		+0.9
Conservative gain from Liberal		Swing	+4.3	

General election February 1974: Hazel Grove
Party	Candidate	Votes	%	±%
Liberal	Michael Winstanley	26,966	46.3	+1.7
Conservative	Tom Arnold	24,968	42.9	–2.6
Labour	Allan Roberts	6,315	10.8	+0.9
Majority		1,998	3.4	N/A
Turnout		58,249	86.9	+7.2
Registered electors		67,020		+2.1
Liberal gain from Conservative		Swing	+2.2	

1970 notional result
Party	Vote	%
Conservative	23,800	45.5
Liberal	23,300	44.6
Labour	5,200	9.9
Turnout	52,300	79.7
Electorate	65,609	

== See also ==
- List of parliamentary constituencies in Greater Manchester
- History of parliamentary constituencies and boundaries in Cheshire

== Sources ==
- Election results 1974–2001
