= The First Gentleman (play) =

1945 play

- Original language: English
- Written by: Norman Ginsbury
- Genre: Historical
- Setting: England, 1810s

Premiere
- Date: 2 April 1945
- Place: Manchester Opera House

The First Gentleman is a 1945 historical play by the British writer Norman Ginsbury. It portrays the relationship between the future George IV, his daughter Princess Charlotte of Wales and her husband Leopold. It is set during the Regency era and features many other prominent figures of the time. It takes place between 1814 and 1819, set primarily at Carlton House and Brighton Pavilion.

Its West End run lasted for 553 performances between 18 July 1945 and 16 November 1946, originally at the New Theatre before transferring to the Savoy. The cast included Robert Morley as Prince George, Wendy Hiller as Charlotte, Philip Friend as Leopold, Amy Frank as Caroline of Brunswick and Robert Beaumont as William, Prince of Orange. The music was by Herbert Griffiths.

== Film adaptation ==
In 1948 the work was adapted into a film of the same title directed by Alberto Cavalcanti and starring Jean-Pierre Aumont, Joan Hopkins and Cecil Parker.

== Bibliography ==
- Wearing, J.P. The London Stage 1940-1949: A Calendar of Productions, Performers, and Personnel. Rowman & Littlefield, 2014.
