= Norman Ginsbury =

- Born: 8 November 1902; Whitechapel, London, England
- Died: 15 October 1991 (aged 88); Eastbourne, East Sussex, England
- Occupation: Writer

Norman Ginsbury (1902–1991) was a British writer, known for his plays. He also wrote material for film and television.

His 1935 play Viceroy Sarah about Sarah Churchill, Duchess of Marlborough, ran for 157 performances in the West End. The play was the basis for Gilbert Miller's 1941 production Anne of England, which was adapted by Ethel Borden and Mary Cass Canfield and starred Flora Robson.

His 1945 play The First Gentleman, with music by Herbert Griffiths, ran for more than five hundred performances and was adapted into a 1948 film of the same title. In 1946 he had also worked on the screenplay of The Magic Bow for Gainsborough Pictures. He was also co-wrote the original screenplay for Alexander Korda's troubled film production Bonnie Prince Charlie.

He also translated several of Henrik Ibsen's works for performance on the London stage.

== Bibliography ==
- Goble, Alan. The Complete Index to Literary Sources in Film. Walter de Gruyter, 1999.
- Wearing, J. P. The London Stage 1930-1939: A Calendar of Productions, Performers, and Personnel. Rowman & Littlefield, 2014.
