= Walzer aus Wien =

Opera

Walzer aus Wien ("Waltzes from Vienna," titled The Great Waltz in English) is a singspiel pasticcio in three acts, libretto by Alfred Maria Willner, Heinz Reichert and Ernst Marischka, music by Johann Strauss I (father) and Johann Strauss II (son), arranged by Erich Wolfgang Korngold and Julius Bittner, first performed at the Stadttheater in Vienna on 30 October 1930.

== French and English versions ==
The libretto was translated into French by André Mouëzy-Éon and Jean Marietti, and first performed, under the title Valses de Vienne at the Théâtre de la Porte Saint-Martin in Paris on 21 December 1933.

An English musical theatre adaptation called Walzes from Vienna (with additional music arranged by Herbert Griffiths), played in London at the Alhambra Theatre in 1931 with a cast led by Evelyn Herbert. As The Great Waltz it also played on Broadway in 1934, and there was another English version produced in London in 1970.

== Roles ==
Role	Voice type	Premiere Cast, 30 October 1930 (Conductor:)
Resi	soprano	Paula Brosig
Johann Strauss Jr	baritone	Hubert Marischka
Countess Olga	soprano	Betty Fischer
Johann Strauss Sr	spoken	Willy Thaller
Frau Kratochwill	soprano	Mizzi Zwerenz
Prince Gogol	tenor	Ludwig Herold
Leopold	tenor	Karl Göttler
Ebeseder	tenor	Fritz Imhoff

== Synopsis ==
The action takes place in Vienna around 1845, and relates the rivalry between the Strausses, father and son, and the love of the young Resi for Strauss Jr., but with the help of a Russian Countess, father and son are reconciled and love triumphs.

== Discography ==
- Valses de Vienne - Thérèse Schmidt, Aimé Doniat, Lina Dachary, Rosine Brédy, Jean-Louis Simon - Chorus and Orchestra, Jean-Claude Hartemann - Véga (1962)
- Valses de Vienne - Mady Mesplé, Bernard Sinclair, Christiane Stutzmann, Pierre Bertin - Choeurs René Duclos, Orchestre de l'Opéra-Comique, Jean Doussard - EMI (1971)

== Film ==
- Waltzes from Vienna, directed by Alfred Hitchcock (UK, 1934)

== Sources ==
- Casaglia, Gherardo (2005)."Walzer aus Wien". L'Almanacco di Gherardo Casaglia (in Italian).
- Gänzl, Kurt (1992), 'Walzer aus Wien' in The New Grove Dictionary of Opera, ed. Stanley Sadie (London) ISBN 0-333-73432-7
- L'opéra, Pierre Brunel & Stéphane Wolff, (Bordas,1980) ISBN 2-04-016367-0'
