= Just Joe =

1960 British film by Maclean Rogers

- Original Front of House still
- Directed by: Maclean Rogers
- Screenplay by: Raymond Drewe
- Based on: an original story by Donald Bull
- Produced by: Roger Proudlock
- Starring: Leslie Randall; Joan Reynolds; Michael Shepley; Anna May Wong
- Cinematography: Geoffrey Faithfull
- Edited by: Peter Austen-Hunt
- Production company: Roger Proudlock Productions (as Parkside Productions)
- Distributed by: Archway Film Distributors Ltd. (UK)
- Release date: July 1960 (UK)
- Running time: 73 minutes
- Country: United Kingdom
- Language: English

Just Joe is a 1960 British comedy film directed by Maclean Rogers and starring Leslie Randall, Joan Reynolds, Michael Shepley, and Anna May Wong. The screenplay was by Raymond Drewe based on a story by Donald Bull. Factory worker Joe discovers his heroic side when he becomes involved with spies chasing the secret formula of a new detergent.

== Preservation status ==
The British Film Institute National Archive holds a collection of stills but no film or video materials.

== Plot ==
When Joe, an ineffectual employee at a detergent factory, asks for a rise, his boss, Fowler, sacks him. But when it turns out that Joe has been awarded a medal for gallantry in the Korean war, Fowler immediately reinstates him – at a better salary – and starts a publicity campaign involving Peach Blossom, a Chinese woman Joe had rescued. Joe's wife Sybil soon becomes jealous of Peach Blossom, and her previously happy marriage is now on the rocks. Then a shady character called Charlie appears, claiming he is the real hero, not Joe, and he tries to blackmail Joe into supplying the company's secret detergent formula. When it is revealed that both Peach Blossom and Charlie are con-artists, Joe and Sybil are reconciled.

== Cast ==
- Leslie Randall as Joe
- Joan Reynolds as Sybil
- Michael Shepley as Fowler
- Anna May Wong as Peach Blossom
- Jon Pertwee as Prendergast
- Howard Pays as Rodney
- Martin Wyldeck as Bill
- Noel Dyson as Myra
- Bruce Seton as Charlie
- David Sale as Carruthers
- Betty Huntley-Wright as Miss Appleby

== Reception ==
The Monthly Film Bulletin wrote: "Despite simple and hard-working performances by Joan Reynolds and Leslie Randall, this film remains another lamentable example of the general ineptness of second-feature domestic comedy. The story is soap-opera, the pace slack and the direction lifeless. Michael Shepley and Jon Pertwee overplay their respective roles of peppery employer and zany research chemist in a desperate attempt to win a few laughs. A fight in a detergent laboratory provides a routine slapstick climax."

Kine Weekly wrote: "The script is somewhat sudsy, but the principal players work hard, the humour is clean and the staging adequate, it'll tickle the undemanding. ...The picture, which gives the impression of being made off the cuff, lacks cohesion, but incidental situations amuse. Leslie Randall has his moments as Joe; Joan Reynolds is-a refreshing Sybil; Michael Shepley registers as the choleric Fowler; and Anna May Wong looks her part as Peach Blosom. The first half is definitely on the slow side, but slapstick puts some pep into its concluding chapters."
