= Rough Waters =

1930 film

- Theatrical release poster
- Directed by: John Daumery
- Screenplay by: James A Starr (& dialogue)
- Story by: Lillie Hayward
- Starring: Rin Tin Tin; Lane Chandler; Jobyna Ralston; Edmund Breese
- Cinematography: William Rees
- Production company: Warner Bros. Pictures
- Distributed by: Warner Bros. Pictures
- Release date: June 7, 1930
- Running time: 53 Minutes
- Country: United States
- Language: English
- Budget: $76,000
- Box office: $129,000

Rough Waters is a 1930 American pre-Code all-talking adventure drama film directed by John Daumery and starring Rin Tin Tin. The film was adapted by James A. Starr from a story by Lillie Hayward, and was the last Rin Tin Tin film produced by Warner Bros. Pictures.

== Plot ==
The film begins with a parked car with drawn curtains inside of which three gangsters and silently waiting for their prey. When a large closed vehicle approaches the car with gangsters it crashes and the gangsters quickly rush to the vehicle, kill the chauffeur and two guards and steal a satchel with 100,000 dollars.

The gangsters then look for a hideout and find a fishing hut. This hut is the home of Capt. Thomas, who can no longer walk, and his young daughter Mary. Mary is in love with Cal Morton, who is a policeman that rides a motorcycle. Morton is Rin Tin Tin's owner. Masquerading as government agents, the gangsters break into the hut and prevent Capt. Thomas and Mary from leaving.

When Rin Tin Tin delivers the daily newspaper, as usual, Mary manages to place a note on Rin Tin Tin for Cal Morton. When Cal arrives with Rin Tin Tin, he and his dog are wounded by one of the gangsters. The gangsters also capture two mail agents. The gangsters then attempt to make a getaway by using a boat. In spite of being injured, Rin Tin Tin manages to prevent the escape of the gangsters and delivers them to Cal who handcuffs them with Bill's help.

== Cast ==
- Rin Tin Tin as Rinty
- Lane Chandler as Cal Morton
- Jobyna Ralston as Mary
- Edmund Breese as Captain Thomas
- Walter Miller as Morris
- William Irving as Bill
- George Rigon as Fred
- Richard Alexander as Little
- Skeets Noyes as Davis

== Box office ==
According to Warner Bros the film earned $95,000 domestically and $34,000 foreign.

== Preservation status ==
Rough Waters is now considered to be a lost film. No copies are known to exist.

== See also ==
- List of lost films
