= Tom Arnold (politician) =

British politician (1947–2023)

Sir Tom Arnold

Chair of the Treasury Select Committee
- In office 1 January 1995 – 16 October 1996

Member of Parliament for Hazel Grove
- In office 10 October 1974 – 8 April 1997
- Preceded by: Michael Winstanley
- Succeeded by: Andrew Stunell

Personal details
- Born: Thomas Richard Arnold; 25 January 1947 London, England
- Died: 14 November 2023 (aged 76)
- Party: Conservative
- Education: Pembroke College, Oxford

Sir Thomas Richard Arnold (25 January 1947 – 14 November 2023) was a British Conservative Party politician who was the Member of Parliament (MP) for Hazel Grove from 1974 to 1997.

== Biography ==
Thomas Richard Arnold was born in London on 25 January 1947, to his parents Thomas Charles Arnold, a theatrical producer and Helen Arnold. Young Tom Arnold attended the Bedales School, the Institut Le Rosey, and Pembroke College, Oxford.

Arnold died on 14 November 2023, at the age of 76.

== Political career ==
After unsuccessfully contesting the safe Labour seat of Manchester Cheetham in 1970, Arnold was elected to the British House of Commons for Hazel Grove in October 1974, defeating the Liberal incumbent Michael Winstanley; he had fought the same seat unsuccessfully in the previous General Election that same year. He served as the Conservative Member of Parliament for Hazel Grove until his retirement in 1997. From 1979 to 1982, Arnold was the Parliamentary Private Secretary in the Northern Ireland Office and later in the Foreign and Commonwealth Office. In 1983, Arnold was appointed Vice-Chairman of the Conservative Party under Chairmen Cecil Parkinson and John Gummer.

When Arnold began office, in 1974, he was one of the youngest members of Parliament, along with Anthony Nelson and Malcolm Rifkind, later joined in 1977 by both Andrew MacKay and Tim Smith. During the 1970s, the five were referred to as "The Tories' Young Men", with Arnold being the only backbencher in the group. Arnold was an ardent supporter of the European Economic Community during his time in Parliament, although he later became much more sceptical.

Arnold was knighted in the 1990 Birthday Honours for political service.

Parliament of the United Kingdom
Preceded by Michael Winstanley	Member of Parliament for Hazel Grove; 1974—1997	Succeeded by Andrew Stunell
