= Daumery =

Daumery is a surname. Notable people with the surname include:

- Carrie Daumery (1863–1938), Dutch-American actress
- Jean Daumery (1898–1934), Belgian film director
