= William Wragg =

British politician (born 1987)

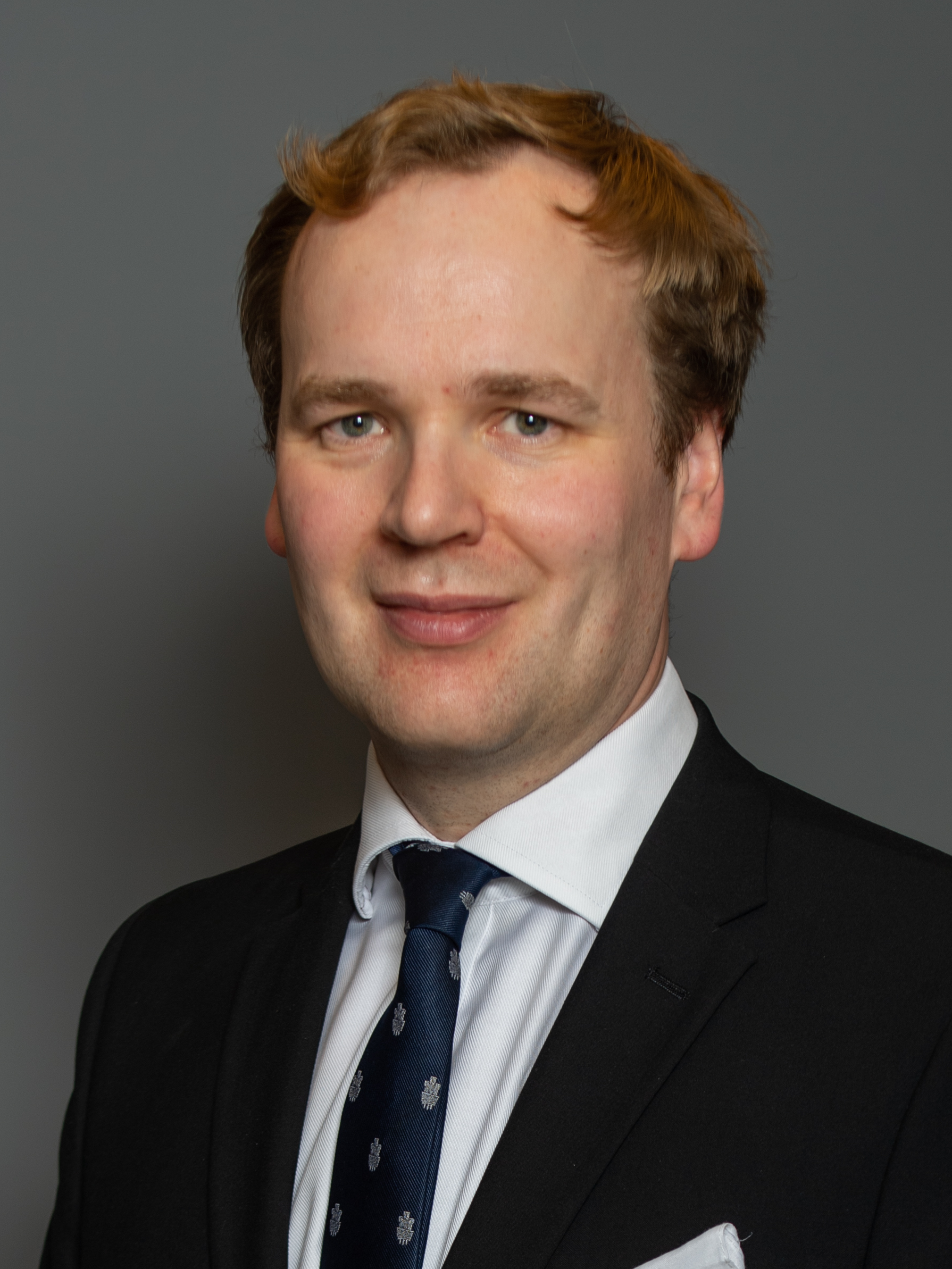
- Official portrait, 2022

Chairman of the Public Administration and Constitutional Affairs Select Committee
- In office 29 January 2020 – 8 April 2024
- Preceded by: Sir Bernard Jenkin
- Succeeded by: Dame Jackie Doyle-Price

Member of Parliament for Hazel Grove
- In office 7 May 2015 – 30 May 2024
- Preceded by: Andrew Stunell
- Succeeded by: Lisa Smart

Personal details
- Born: 11 December 1987 (age 38)
- Party: Independent (since April 2024); Conservative (until April 2024)
- Education: Poynton High School
- Alma mater: University of Manchester
- Occupation: Politician
- Website: williamwragg.org.uk

William Peter Wragg (born 11 December 1987), is a British politician who served as the Member of Parliament (MP) for Hazel Grove in Greater Manchester from 2015 to 2024. As a member of the Conservative Party, he previously served as a vice-chairman of its 1922 Committee. From April 2024 until parliament was dissolved in May 2024, he sat as an independent.

== Early life and education ==
William Wragg was born on 11 December 1987. He attended Poynton High School before gaining a first-class degree in history from the University of Manchester.

Wragg became a school governor in 2008 and went on to volunteer as a student mentor. He unsuccessfully stood as the Conservative candidate in the Hazel Grove ward of Stockport Metropolitan Borough Council in 2010, but was elected in the same ward in 2011. He completed a two-year Teach First training programme as a primary school teacher before taking up a job as a caseworker for a Conservative MP in 2014.

== Parliamentary career ==
At the 2015 general election Wragg was elected as MP for Hazel Grove, winning with 41.4% of the vote and a majority of 6,552. He stood down as a councillor and, in 2016, the Liberal Democrats won back the Hazel Grove council ward seat.

In February 2016, Wragg disclosed that he had moved back to his parents' house in order to save money for a deposit on buying a house.

In May 2016, it was reported that Wragg was one of a number of Conservative MPs being investigated by police in the 2015 general election party spending investigation, for allegedly spending more than the legal limit on constituency election campaign expenses; he was interviewed, under caution, by Police in 2017, after which Police passed his file to the Crown Prosecution Service (CPS). In May 2017, the CPS decided that no criminal charges would be brought.

Wragg campaigned for Brexit in the 2016 EU membership referendum and, following the resignation of Prime Minister David Cameron, campaigned for Andrea Leadsom in the 2016 Conservative leadership election.

At the snap 2017 general election, Wragg was re-elected as MP for Hazel Grove with an increased vote share of 45.4% and a decreased majority of 5,514. He had been targeted by the successor to the Remain campaign, Open Britain, for his support of a hard Brexit. Wragg served on the Procedure, Education and Backbench Business Committees, and the Finance Committee.

At the 2019 general election, Wragg was again re-elected with an increased vote share of 48.8% and a decreased majority of 4,423. In January 2020, Wragg was elected to chair the Public Administration and Constitutional Affairs Select Committee. Wragg won the contest by 335 to 183 votes.

Following an interim report on the connections between colonialism and properties now in the care of the National Trust, including links with historic slavery, Wragg was among the signatories of a letter to The Telegraph in November 2020 from the "Common Sense Group" of Conservative Parliamentarians. The letter accused the National Trust of being "coloured by cultural Marxist dogma, colloquially known as the 'woke agenda'".

In 2020, Wragg became a "lockdown rebel" and a steering committee member of the lockdown-sceptic COVID Recovery Group alongside a group of Conservatives who opposed the UK government's December 2020 lockdown. The Guardian described the group as European Research Group (ERG)-inspired, and a response by backbench Conservatives to Nigel Farage's anti-lockdown Reform UK party.

On 12 January 2022, Wragg called for Prime Minister Boris Johnson to resign over the Westminster lockdown parties controversy. Wragg publicly confirmed he had submitted a letter of no confidence in Johnson. On 20 January 2022, Wragg accused whips of blackmail against Conservative MPs who were believed to support ousting Johnson as prime minister. He said he had heard stories of MPs being told they could face loss of public investment in their constituencies and releasing of embarrassing stories. On 24 January, the Metropolitan Police met with Wragg to discuss the allegations.

Wragg became the sixth MP to call for Prime Minister Liz Truss's resignation on 19 October 2022. He also submitted a letter of no confidence in her leadership. On 22 November 2022, Wragg announced he would be standing down at the 2024 general election.

=== Grindr honeytrap scandal ===
In April 2024, Wragg admitted to sharing the contact details of several other Conservative MPs with a blackmailer after being the victim of a honeytrap on the gay dating app Grindr. Wragg had sent indecent images of himself to the blackmailer, who then threatened to release the images to the public unless Wragg provided the personal contacts of the other MPs. When the news of the affair broke, Wragg stated: "I was scared. I'm mortified. I'm so sorry that my weakness has caused other people hurt". Wragg later quit both his role as chair of the Commons Public Administration and Constitutional Affairs Committee and as vice chair of the 1922 Committee. On 9 April 2024 Wragg resigned the Conservative Party whip and sat as an Independent.

== Personal life ==
In November 2024 Wragg spoke publicly about being a victim of catfishing. He recalled that he had struggled with his mental health in the past and had had suicidal thoughts which led to him being admitted to hospital.

Parliament of the United Kingdom
| Preceded by Andrew Stunell | Member of Parliament for Hazel Grove; 2015–2024 | Succeeded by Lisa Smart |
