= Viceroy Sarah =

1935 play

- Original language: English
- Written by: Norman Ginsbury
- Genre: Historical
- Setting: England, 1704, 1711

Premiere
- Date: 2 February 1935
- Place: Whitehall Theatre, London

Viceroy Sarah is a 1935 historical play by the British writer Norman Ginsbury. It is based on the relationship between Sarah, Duchess of Marlborough and Queen Anne during the time of the War of the Spanish Succession.

Its West End run lasted for a 157 performances, premiering at the Whitehall Theatre before transferring to the Phoenix Theatre. Irene Vanbrugh starred as Sarah Churchill, alongside Barbara Everest as Anne and Robert Rendel as the Duke of Marlborough. The cast also included Harcourt Williams as George, Prince of Denmark, Olga Lindo as Abigail Hill and Ian Fleming as Robert Harley.

== Bibliography ==
- Wearing, J.P. The London Stage 1930-1939: A Calendar of Productions, Performers, and Personnel. Rowman & Littlefield, 2014.
