= Le Mois Molière =

Le Mois Molière (The Molière Month) is a theatre and music festival that takes place every year from the 1st to the 30th of June in the streets, parks, theatres and historical sites of the city of Versailles.

Created by François de Mazières in 1996, it promotes the renewal of popular theatre by giving priority to new companies in the festival programme and offering most of the shows for free. "The will to get out into the neighborhoods, the free aspect, the festive side and the will to perform great texts: all that is part of the festival's genetic code" explained François de Mazières in 2009, also the mayor of Versailles.

The creators chose the name of the festival in reference to the link between Versailles and Molière.

Launched in 1996, under the leadership of Francis Perrin, the then director of the Théâtre Montansier, who went around the streets of Versailles on his cart, with his troupe. He staged The Jealousy of Barbouille (La Jalousie du barbouillé fr:La Jalousie du barbouillé) and then, in 1997, The Flying Doctor (Le Médecin Volant) and The Mad (Les Fâcheux fr:Les Fâcheux). In 1999, he passed the flame to Jean-Daniel Laval, who took charge of the theatre.
