= Julius Bittner =

Austrian composer (1874–1939)

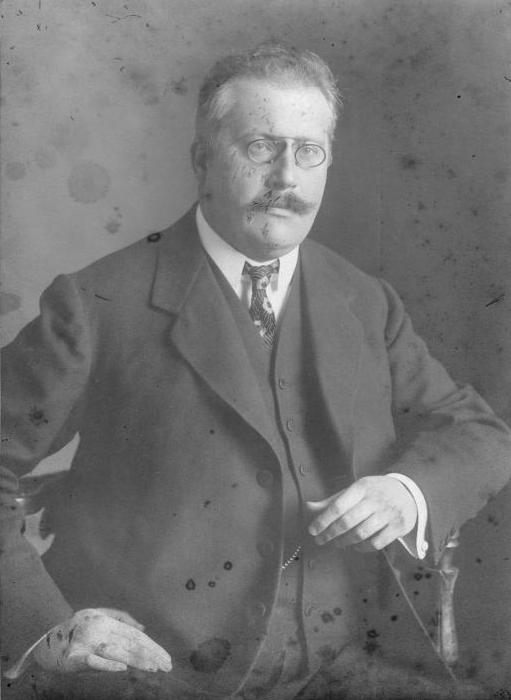
Julius Bittner in 1911

Julius Bittner (born Vienna, 9 April 1874; died Vienna, 9 January 1939) was an Austrian composer.

== Life ==
The son of a judge, Bittner also initially pursued a career in law. Until 1920 he was a judge in Wolkersdorf im Weinviertel, in Lower Austria. From 1920 to 1922 or 1923 he was an official in the Austrian Department of Justice.

In addition, Julius Bittner became one of the best-known and most performed Austrian opera composers in the first half of the 20th century. Many of his operas deal with Austrian-Alpine themes. He usually wrote his own libretti. After the Second World War, however, as a typical representative of late Romantic opera in the tradition of Richard Wagner, he was gradually forgotten. Critics gave him the somewhat derogatory nickname "the Anzengruber of the opera"; in importance he is comparable to his better known contemporary Wilhelm Kienzl.

Bittner was married to the alto Emilie Werner. As a leading member of Vienna's judiciary and close friend of Gustav Mahler, he assessed Mahler's estate for probate after his death. He later won the Mahler Prize in 1915. He composed many operas, two symphonies and many songs and was helped and promoted by Mahler and Bruno Walter. He was also a close friend of Erich Wolfgang Korngold and Franz Schmidt. He was for a while editor of the Austrian music journal Der Merker and wrote music criticism for it and other newspapers. He was so influential that he was able to arrange Arnold Schoenberg's release from active military service in the First World War.

He received numerous awards and honors and became a member of the Prussian Academy of Arts in Berlin in 1925. In 1964, the archive containing almost all of his works (autograph sketches, text books, scores and piano reductions) was taken over by the Vienna City Library.

Bittner is buried in an honorary grave in Vienna's Central Cemetery (Group 32C, Plot 15).

== Works ==
=== Operas (selection) ===
- 1907 Die rote Gred (premièred by conductor Ludwig Rottenberg on 26 October 1907 in Frankfurt am Main. The Viennese premiere, conducted by Bruno Walter at the Imperial Royal Court Opera, Vienna – today the Vienna State Opera, took place on 10 April 1908.)
- 1909 Der Musikant (premièred by Bruno Walter at the Imperial Royal Court Opera, Vienna – today the Vienna State Opera)
- 1911 Der Bergsee
- 1916 Das Höllisch Gold (his most successful work)
- 1917 Der liebe Augustin (Viennese Singspiel)
- 1921 Die Kohlhaymerin
- 1923 Das Rosengärtlein
- 1928 Mondnacht
- 1934 Das Veilchen

=== Voice with orchestra ===
- Sechs Lieder von der unglücklichen Liebe der edlen Dame Ping Tschi-Yu (1922)
- Grosse Messe mit te Deum (1926)

=== Orchestral Works ===
- Vaterland, Symphonic Poem in D minor (1915)
- Symphony No. 1 in F minor (1922)
- Symphony No. 2 in C minor (1934)

=== Chamber Music ===
- String Quartet No. 1 in A major (1913)
- String Quartet No. 2 in E-flat major (1917)

Julius Bittner also composed two symphonies, two symphonic poems and a work for two pianos and orchestra entitled Österreichische Tänze (Austrian Dances). He wrote incidental music to plays by Shakespeare, and for popular plays by Johann Nestroy and Ferdinand Raimund, chamber works (including two string quartets and a still unpublished Cello Sonata) many songs, and a Great Mass and Te Deum which was a cornerstone of the Austrian choral tradition until World War II. He also composed numerous operettas and three ballets, and assisted his friend Erich Wolfgang Korngold in the creation of the most successful of the Johann Strauss pastiches - Walzer aus Wien (premièred in Vienna on 30 October 1930), which became known in English as The Great Waltz.

== Awards ==
- 1915 Gustav Mahler Prize
- 1918 Raimund Prize
- 1925 City of Vienna Arts Prize
- 1937 Austrian State Prize for music and Literature

== Sources ==
- Richard Specht. Julius Bittner. Zeitgenössische Komponisten 10. Munich: Drei Masken, 1921.
- Julius Korngold. "Julius Bittner: 'Die rote Gred', 'Der Musikant', 'Der Bergsee', 'Das höllisch Gold'". In Deutsches Opernschaffen der Gegenwart. Kritische Aufsätze. Leipzig: Leonhardt, 1921. pp. 196–223.
- Hermann Ullrich. Julius Bittner. Eine Studie. Österreichische Komponisten des 20. Jahrhunderts 13. Vienna: Lafite, 1968.
- Waltraud Zauner. "Studien zu den musikalischen Bühnenwerken von Julius Bittner: mit Beiträgen zur Lebensgeschichte des Komponisten". Dissertation, University of Vienna, 1983.
- Waltraud Zauner. "Neues zur Lebensgeschichte von Julius Bittner". Studien zur Musikwissenschaft 35 (1984) 131–184.
- Waltraud Zauner. "'Meine tiefe und aufrichtige Verehrung für Ihre Person und Ihr Werk': Briefe an Julius Bittner". Österreichische Musikzeitung 44.2 (1989) 70–80.
