= Andrew Stunell =

British politician (1942–2024)

The Right Honourable The Lord Stunell OBE PC
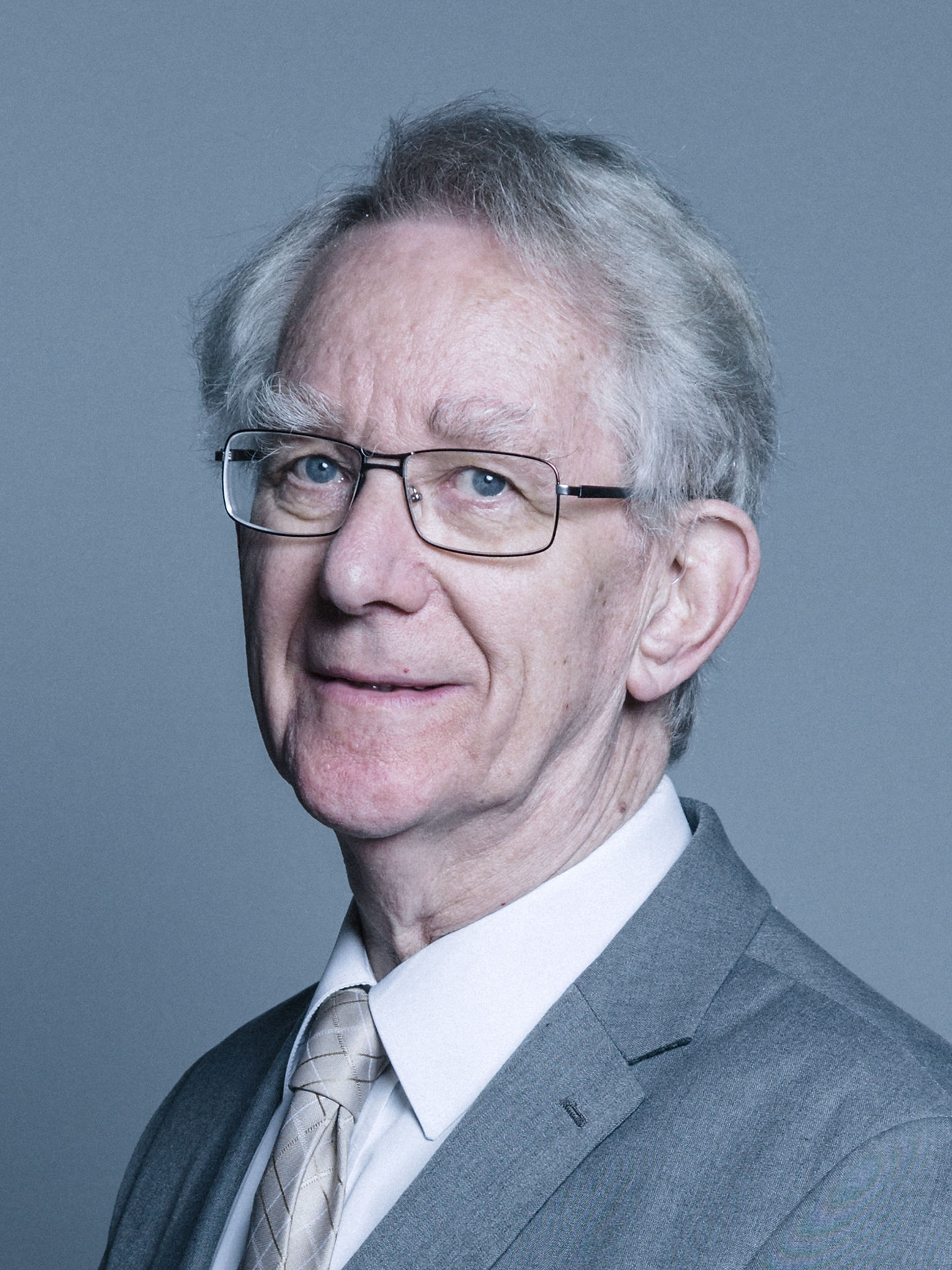
- Official portrait, 2018

Parliamentary Under Secretary of State for Communities and Local Government
- In office 13 May 2010 – 4 September 2012
- Prime Minister: David Cameron
- Preceded by: Barbara Follett
- Succeeded by: Don Foster

Liberal Democrat Chief Whip in the House of Commons
- In office 7 June 2001 – 22 March 2006
- Leader: Charles Kennedy
- Preceded by: Paul Tyler
- Succeeded by: Paul Burstow

Member of the House of Lords
- Lord Temporal
- Life peerage 26 October 2015 – 29 April 2024

Member of Parliament for Hazel Grove
- In office 1 May 1997 – 30 March 2015
- Preceded by: Tom Arnold
- Succeeded by: William Wragg

Personal details
- Born: 24 November 1942 Sutton, Surrey, England
- Died: 29 April 2024 (aged 81)
- Party: Liberal Democrats
- Education: Victoria University of Manchester; Liverpool John Moores University

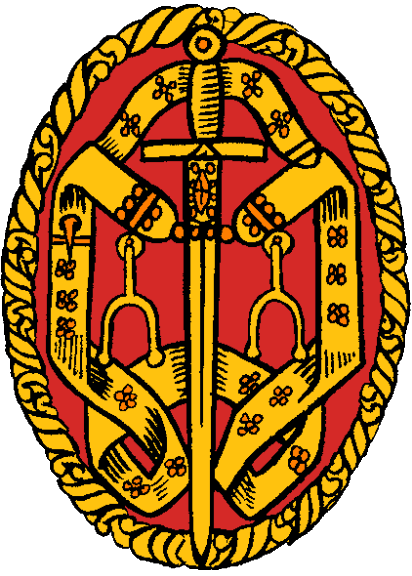
Insignia of a Knight Bachelor

Robert Andrew Stunell, Baron Stunell, OBE, PC (24 November 1942 – 29 April 2024) was a British Liberal Democrat politician who served as Member of Parliament for Hazel Grove from 1997 until he stood down in 2015, and then as a member of the House of Lords from 2015.

From 2010 to 2012 he served as the parliamentary under-secretary of state at the Department of Communities and Local Government. He was nominated for a life peerage in the 2015 Dissolution Honours.

== Early life and career ==
Andrew Stunell was born in Sutton, Surrey. He was educated at Surbiton County Grammar School for Boys, before studying architecture at the University of Manchester and Liverpool Polytechnic. He became a member of RIBA in 1969.

Stunell married Gillian Chorley in 1967. They have three sons and two daughters. He was a former Baptist lay preacher and an active member of his local Methodist church.

After graduation he was an architectural assistant until 1989, working for CWS Manchester from 1965 to 1967, Runcorn New Town from 1967 to 1981, then freelance 1981–5. From 1989 to 1996 he worked as Political Secretary of the Association of Liberal Democrat Councillors and was appointed an Officer of the Order of the British Empire (OBE) in the 1995 New Year Honours.

Stunell was elected to Chester City Council in 1979 and to Cheshire County Council in 1981. He subsequently served on Stockport Council for six years, remaining on the Council for a time after his election as an MP. He contested the City of Chester constituency three times, as the Liberal Party candidate in 1979 and for the SDP-Liberal Alliance in 1983 and 1987.

== Member of Parliament, 1997–2015 ==
=== Hazel Grove ===
Stunell was elected as the member of parliament for Hazel Grove in 1997 having fought the seat previously in 1992 when he came second with 43.1% of the vote. The general election of 1997 resulted in a majority of 11,814 and a 54.5% of the vote, taking the seat from the Conservatives. He retained the seat at the 2001 (52%), 2005 (49.5%) and 2010 (48.8%) general elections.

=== Liberal Democrat Frontbench ===
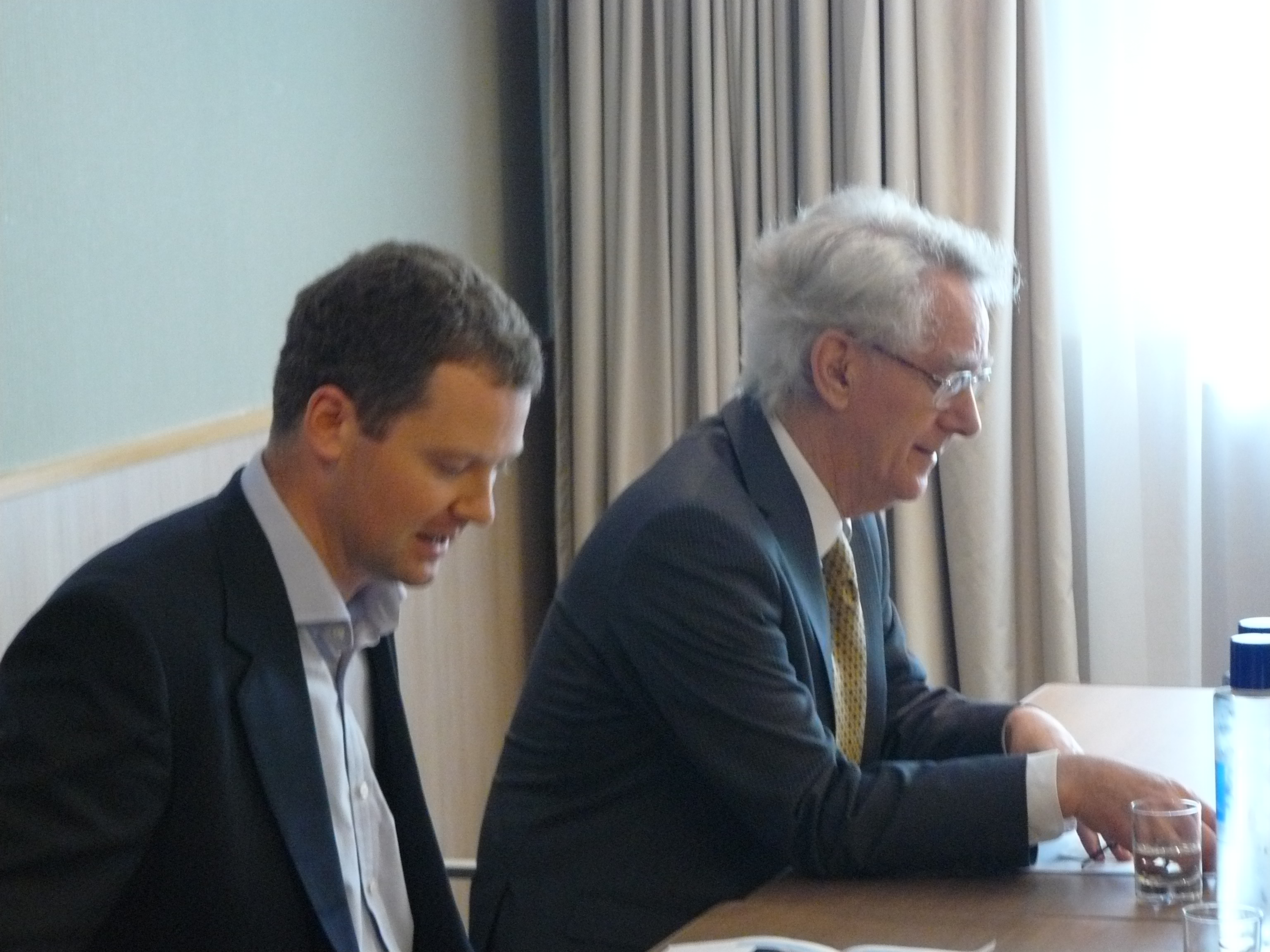
Stunell (right) with Neil O'Brien at Conservative Party conference in 2011

On entering parliament in 1997 Stunell was appointed the Shadow Energy minister under Paddy Ashdown, a role he performed until 2005. At the same time Stunell operated as the party's deputy chief whip, only stepping down from that position in 2001 when he was elected to the position of Chief Whip, a position he was re-elected to in 2005. He stood down from the role in March 2006 to serve as the Shadow Secretary of State for communities and local government which concluded in December 2007 when Nick Clegg asked him to become chair of the Liberal Democrat local elections team. In January 2009 Stunell was appointed to be the Liberal Democrat representative on the International Development Select Committee and in August 2009 he was asked to take on the role of vice-chair of the general election campaign.

=== Sustainable and Secure Buildings Act 2004 ===
In 2003 Stunell came top in the regular ballot of private members' bills and was successful in having his Sustainable and Secure Buildings Bill become an Act of Parliament in 2004. As part of the bill Stunell wanted to see all new and existing homes either built or renovated with security and energy saving features with Stunell saying that he wanted the bill to promote "greener and safer buildings".

=== Coalition negotiations ===
Following the general election of 2010, no one political party was able to secure a majority in the House of Commons. As a result, the Conservatives and Liberal Democrats entered into negotiations with each other to form the United Kingdom's first coalition government since the Second World War.

Stunell along with Danny Alexander, Chris Huhne and David Laws acted as the negotiating team for the Liberal Democrats with William Hague, Oliver Letwin, George Osborne and Edward Llewellyn acting for the Conservatives.

=== Coalition Government ===
Following the formation of the coalition, Stunell was appointed a Parliamentary under-secretary of state at the Department for Communities and Local Government under Secretary of State Eric Pickles. His responsibilities in the role were community cohesion, race equality, building regulations and the implementation of the Big Society particularly with regard to housing and regeneration.

He was sworn in as a member of the Privy Council on 7 November 2012 at Buckingham Palace. This entitled him to the Honorific Prefix "The Right Honourable" for life.

Stunell was knighted for public and political service in the 2013 Birthday Honours. receiving the accolade from the Prince of Wales on 24 January 2014.

In 2013 he announced that he would be stepping down at the next general election.

== Life peerage ==
Stunell was created a Life Peer taking the title Baron Stunell, of Hazel Grove in the County of Greater Manchester on 26 October 2015.

Stunell died on 29 April 2024, at the age of 81.

Parliament of the United Kingdom
Preceded by Tom Arnold	Member of Parliament for Hazel Grove; 1997–2015	Succeeded by William Wragg
Party political offices
Preceded by Paul Tyler	Liberal Democrat Chief Whip of the House of Commons; 2001–2006	Succeeded by Paul Burstow
