= The First Gentleman =

- UK theatrical poster
- Directed by: Alberto Cavalcanti
- Written by: Reginald Long; Nicholas Phipps
- Based on: The First Gentleman by Norman Ginsbury
- Produced by: Joseph Friedman
- Starring: Jean-Pierre Aumont; Joan Hopkins; Cecil Parker
- Cinematography: Jack Hildyard
- Edited by: Margery Saunders
- Music by: Lennox Berkeley
- Production company: Columbia British Productions
- Distributed by: Columbia Pictures
- Release dates: 15 March 1948 (UK); 17 February 1949 (US)
- Running time: 111 minutes
- Country: United Kingdom
- Language: English

The First Gentleman is a 1948 British historical drama film directed by Alberto Cavalcanti, and starring Jean-Pierre Aumont, Joan Hopkins, and Cecil Parker. It portrays the relationships and marriage of George, Prince Regent (future George IV) and his tense dealings with other members of his family such as his only child Princess Charlotte and his younger brother Frederick, Duke of York. It was also released as Affairs of a Rogue.The film is based on a play, The First Gentleman by Norman Ginsbury, which was staged in London in 1945, starring Robert Morley as the Prince Regent and Wendy Hiller as Princess Charlotte.

The film title is taken from the Prince Regent's nickname, the First Gentleman of Europe.

== Plot ==
At Windsor Castle in 1810, physicians tell the Queen that King George III will not recover his sanity. Their son and heir to the throne, Prince George, becomes Regent.

The Prince Regent plans to marry his only daughter Princess Charlotte, to Prince William of Orange and their engagement is announced. However, Charlotte shows more interest in Prince Leopold of Saxe-Coburg-Saalfeld, a poverty-stricken German prince living in England. The Prince Regent tries to force his decision upon her. He himself is estranged from his wife Caroline and in a relationship with Isabella, his longstanding mistress.

Charlotte leaves without permission to visit her mother Caroline at Connaught House. John Fisher, Bishop of Salisbury is sent to retrieve her. Henry Brougham, a government advisor, is also sent to assist. Together, they persuade her to go back to Windsor Castle and stay with her grandmother, Queen Charlotte, for at least 18 months.

Meanwhile, travelling on the continent, Prince Leopold meets Prince William of Orange, who informs him that William's engagement to Charlotte was broken off a long time before. Prince Leopold returns to England.

The Prince Regent is hosting a dinner at the newly completed Brighton Pavilion when a crowd begins to gather outside. They cheer Charlotte when she goes to the window to look at the fireworks but boo the Regent when he appears. His advisors tell him that if he were to let Charlotte marry Leopold he would be cheered. The Prince Regent is then persuaded by Charlotte to allow the marriage, but he says that as the state would have to support Prince Leopold he would be better placed as ruler of Hanover; however, Charlotte insists that she and Leopold will live in England. The Prince Regent decides to send abroad for Leopold's return, and it is then revealed that Leopold is already waiting in the Pavilion.

Leopold and Charlotte marry and the Prince Regent buys them Claremont House as a wedding present. Charlotte becomes pregnant but their son is stillborn and Charlotte becomes immediately ill, dying shortly before her father arrives. He is devastated, saying "Two generations gone in a moment". Grieving, he organises a funeral fit for a queen.

18 months later he is at the christening of his brother Prince Edward's daughter, stabilising the royal line of succession. They debate calling her either Alexandrina or Charlotte, but fix upon Victoria as a suitable royal name.

== Cast ==
- Cecil Parker as Prince Regent
- Jean-Pierre Aumont as Prince Leopold
- Joan Hopkins as Princess Charlotte
- Margaretta Scott as Isabella, Lady Hartford, a mistress of the Regent
- Jack Livesey as Edward, one of the Regent's younger brothers
- Ronald Squire as Henry Brougham, advisor to the Regent's estranged wife
- Athene Seyler as Miss Knight, friend of the Regent
- Judy Beaumont as Princess Sophia
- Olwen Brookes as Princess Mary
- Anthony Hawtrey as Sir Richard Croft, Princess Charlotte's physician
- Hugh Griffith as John Fisher, Bishop of Salisbury
- Gerard Heinz as Doctor Stockmar
- Joan Young as Mrs. Griffiths
- George Curzon as Duke of York, one of the Regent's younger brothers
- Betty Huntley-Wright as Princess Elizabeth, one of the Regent's younger sisters
- Tom Gill as Prince William, one of the Regent's younger brothers
- Lydia Sherwood as Princess Augusta, one of the Regent's younger sisters
- Frances Waring as Queen Charlotte, the Regent's mother
- Amy Frank as Caroline
- Richard Shayne as Lord Eldon
- Michael Warre as Public Speaker
- Melissa Stribling as Lady Conyngham, a mistress of the Regent
- Claud Allister as Manservant
- Drusilla Wills as 1st Lady in Waiting
- Judith Nelmes as 2nd Lady in Waiting
- Dorothy Hammond as 3rd Lady in Waiting
- Beatrice Rowe as 4th Lady in Waiting

== Production ==
Vernon Sewell wanted to make the film but Morley refused to appear in it. "He would sell the rights but he wouldn't make the film. Without Bob the thing was worth nothing."

== Critical reception ==
- TV Guide called it "a poorly mounted costume drama with a complicated script that moves at a snail's pace"
- Allmovie wrote, "Swamped in period costumes and decor, Affairs of a Rogue is consistently good to look at, even when the plotline begins to drag."
