= 2002 Stockport Metropolitan Borough Council election =

2002 local election in England

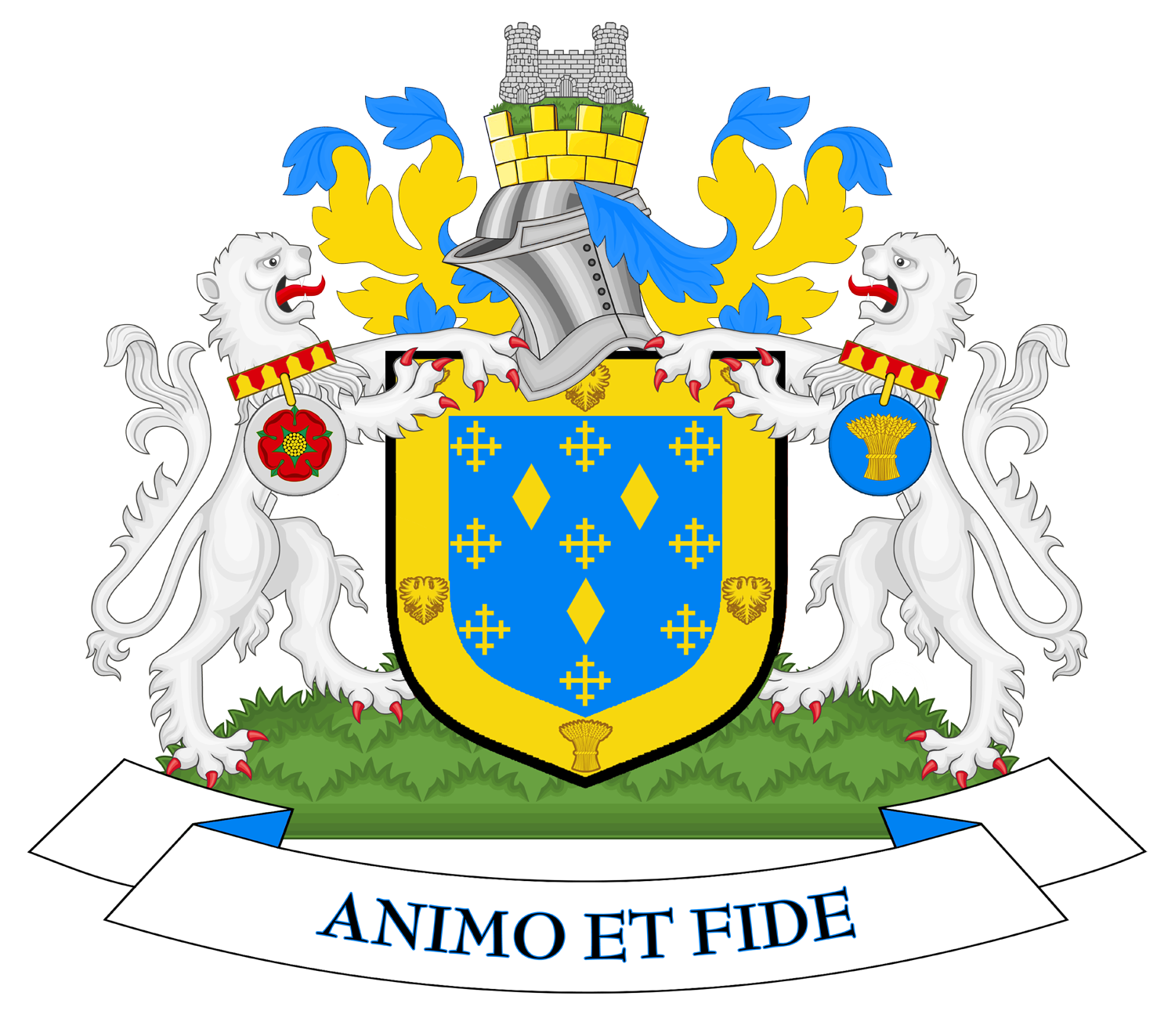
← 2000	2 May 2002	2003 →

21 seats up for election
	First party	Second party
Party	Liberal Democrats	Labour
Seats before	33	21
Seats won	11	6
Seats after	33	19
Seat change	Steady	▼2
	Third party	Fourth party
Party	Conservative	Heald Green Ratepayers
Seats before	6	3
Seats won	3	1
Seats after	8	3
Seat change	▲2	Steady
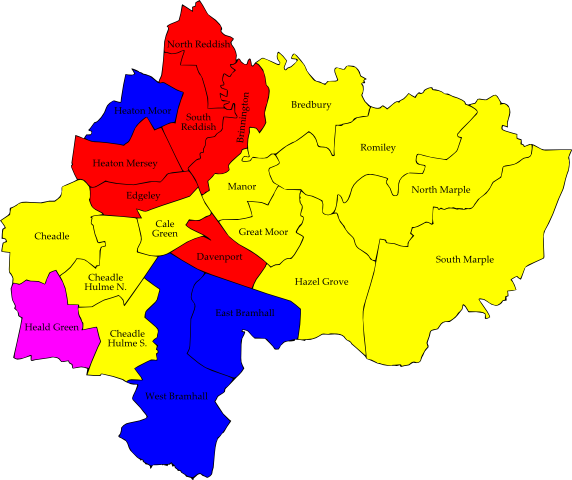
- Map showing the results of the 2002 Stockport Metropolitan Borough Council elections by ward. Red shows Labour seats, blue shows the Conservatives, yellow shows the Liberal Democrats and purple the Heald Green Ratepayers.

The 2002 Stockport Metropolitan Borough Council election was held on 2 May 2002 as part of the wider local elections. Twenty-one seats were up for election across every ward in Stockport and it resulted in the Liberal Democrats having a majority of seats on the council. The Liberal Democrats held this majority until the 2011 local elections.

== Results by ward ==
=== Bramhall East Ward ===
Bramhall East Ward
Party	Candidate	Votes	%	±%
Conservative	Tony Johnson	2,996	54.0	
Liberal Democrats	Stuart Bodsworth	2,226	40.1	
Labour	Keith Fenwick	328	5.9	
Majority				
Turnout		5,550	43.6	
Conservative hold		Swing		
