= 2003 Stockport Metropolitan Borough Council election =

2003 local election in England

Stockport Council Election 2003
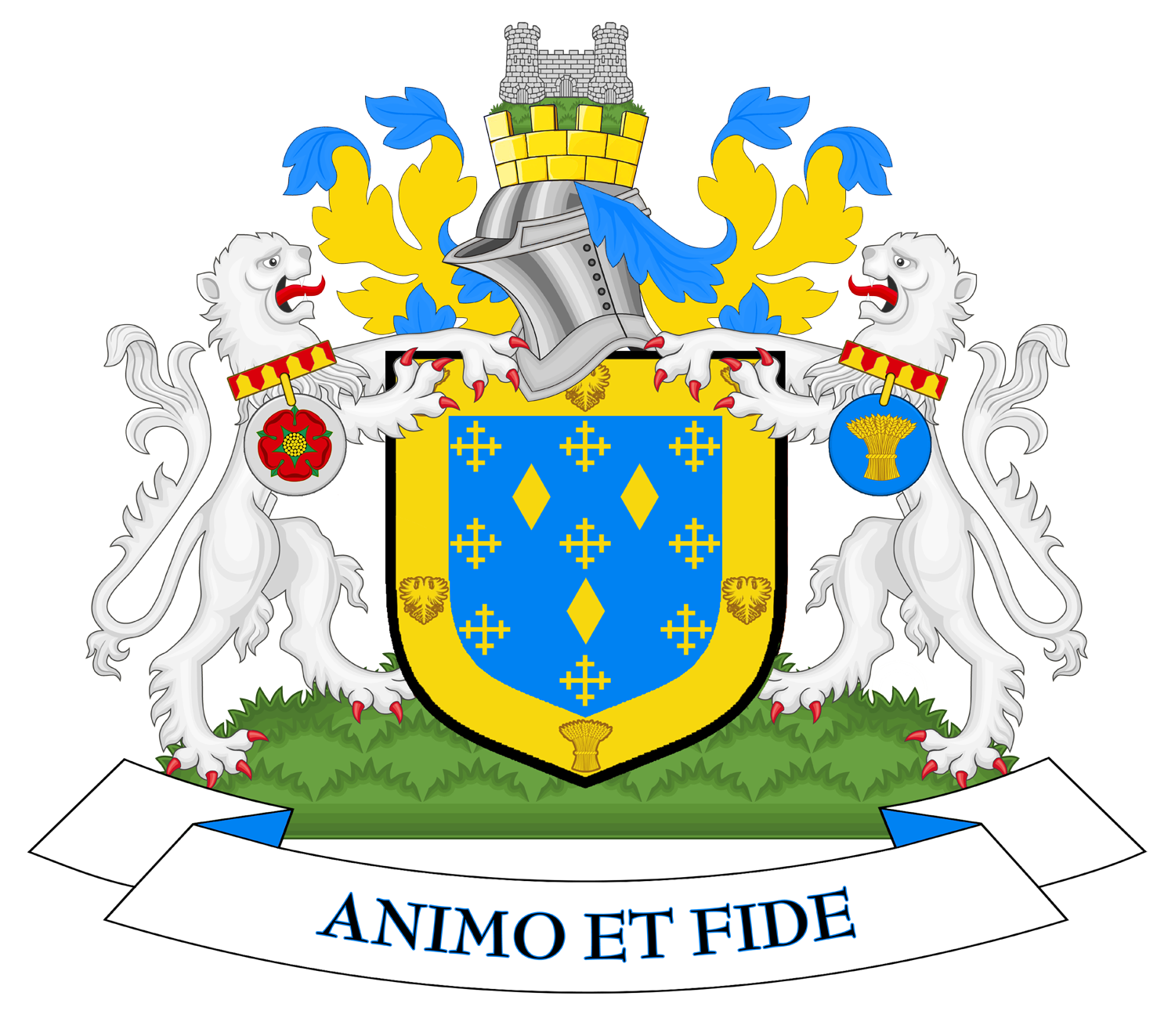
- 1 May 2003

21 Seats up for Election
	First party	Second party
Party	Liberal Democrats	Labour
Seats before	33	19
Seats won	10	5
Seats after	34	17
Seat change	▲1	▼1
	Third party	Fourth party
Party	Conservative	Heald Green Ratepayers
Seats before	8	3
Seats won	3	1
Seats after	9	3
Seat change	▲1	Steady
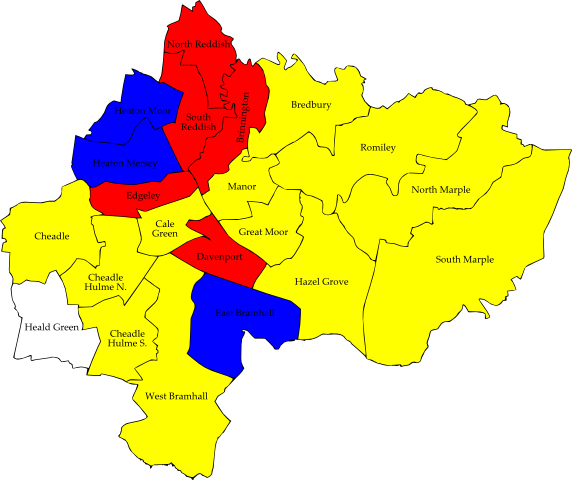
- Map showing the results of the 2003 Stockport Metropolitan Borough Council elections by ward. Red shows Labour seats, blue shows the Conservatives, yellow shows the Liberal Democrats and white the Heald Green Ratepayers.

Elections to Stockport Metropolitan Borough Council were held on 1 May 2003. One third of the council was up for election. The council remained in no overall control and this was the last Stockport local elections before the ward boundary changes came into effect for the 2004 local elections.

== Ward results ==
=== Bramhall East Ward ===
Bramhall East Ward
Party	Candidate	Votes	%	±%
Conservative	Kenneth Holt	2,770	58.4	+4.4
Liberal Democrats	Nicola Joy Livings	1670	35.2	−5.1
Labour	Keith Fenwick	302	6.4	+0.5
Majority		1,100	23.2	+9.3
Turnout		4,742	37.1	−6.5
Conservative hold		Swing		

=== Bramhall West Ward ===
Bramhall West Ward
Party	Candidate	Votes	%	±%
Liberal Democrats	Ann Smith	2,636	48.2	+2.3
Conservative	Christopher Hugh Davenport	2,573	47.1	−1.8
Labour	Gary Raymond Smith	189	3.5	−0.1
UKIP	David Michael Perry	67	1.2	0
Majority		63	1.1	N/A
Turnout		5465	47.0	−2.0
Liberal Democrats gain from Conservative		Swing		

=== Bredbury Ward ===
Bredbury Ward
Party	Candidate	Votes	%	±%
Liberal Democrats	Gordon.C	1,886	66.9	−1.9
Labour	McCarron, R.B.	472	16.7	+0.6
Conservative	Priestly, K.A.	460	16.3	+1.1
Majority		1,414	50.2	−2.5
Turnout		2,818	23.9	−3.6
Liberal Democrats hold		Swing		

=== Brinnington Ward ===
Brinnington Ward
Party	Candidate	Votes	%	±%
Labour	Macalister C.	907	74.4	−0.8
Liberal Democrats	Moss J.	190	15.6	+2.9
Conservative	Sidderley A.	122	10.0	+0.8
Majority		717	58.8	−3.7
Turnout		1,219	16.9	−6.2
Labour hold		Swing		

=== Cale Green Ward ===
Cale Green Ward
Party	Candidate	Votes	%	±%
Liberal Democrats	Abrams J.	1,214	52.4	+1.7
Labour	Mcguire J.	907	39.2	−2.4
Conservative	Berridge E. Ms.	195	8.4	+0.7
Majority		307	13.3	+4.2
Turnout		2,818	25.6	−2.4
Liberal Democrats hold		Swing		

=== Cheadle Ward ===
Cheadle Ward
Party	Candidate	Votes	%	±%
Liberal Democrats	Paul Carter	2,024	53.5	+4.5
Conservative	Louis Eric Livesley	1,402	37.1	−0.8
Labour	David Heywood	357	9.4	0
Majority		622	16.4	+5.3
Turnout		3783	32.5	−3.5
Liberal Democrats hold		Swing		

=== Cheadle Hulme North Ward ===
Cheadle Hulme North Ward
Party	Candidate	Votes	%	±%
Liberal Democrats	John Pantall	1,722	58.1	+4.5
Conservative	Patricia Ann Leck	889	30.0	−4.1
Labour	Steve Bennett	353	11.9	−0.3
Majority		833	28.1	+8.5
Turnout		2964	25.6	−4.8
Liberal Democrats hold		Swing		

=== Cheadle Hulme South Ward ===
Cheadle Hulme South Ward
Party	Candidate	Votes	%	±%
Liberal Democrats	Stuart Bodsworth	1,895	53.1	−1.1
Conservative	David Samuel Lawson	1,362	38.2	+0.2
Labour	Roger Cooper	312	8.7	+1.0
Majority		533	14.9	−1.3
Turnout		3569	31.8	−5.0
Liberal Democrats hold		Swing		

=== Davenport Ward ===
Davenport Ward
Party	Candidate	Votes	%	±%
Labour	Martin Miller	1,212	48.1	+2.2
Conservative	Keith Labrey	853	33.9	−6.7
Liberal Democrats	John Malcolm White	454	18.0	+8.9
Majority		359	14.3	+9.0
Turnout		2,519	27.8	−8.0
Labour hold		Swing		

=== Edgeley Ward ===
Edgeley Ward
Party	Candidate	Votes	%	±%
Labour	Philip Harding	1,437	58.7	−13.4
Liberal Democrats	Alisdair Macdonald Gould	389	15.9	+4.1
BNP	Richard Chadfield	318	13.0	+13.0
Conservative	Beryl Charlesworth	210	8.6	−3.0
Green	Iain Alexander Lindsay-Dunn	96	3.9	−0.5
Majority		1,048	42.8	−17.5
Turnout		2,450	26.5	−0.7
Labour hold		Swing		

=== Great Moor Ward ===
Great Moor Ward
Party	Candidate	Votes	%	±%
Liberal Democrats	Tom Eric Pyle	1,456	53.5	+0.6
Labour	Susan Ball	587	21.6	−0.8
Conservative	Neil Menzies	446	16.4	−3.8
UKIP	Keith Ryan	124	4.6	+4.6
Green	Ken Pease	106	3.9	−0.6
Majority		869	31.9	+1.4
Turnout		2,719	24.8	−3.3
Liberal Democrats hold		Swing		

=== Hazel Grove Ward ===
Hazel Grove Ward
Party	Candidate	Votes	%	±%
Liberal Democrats	Christine Corris	2,193	59.4	+6.1
Conservative	Thomas Anthony Dunstan	1,223	33.1	−5.8
Labour	Terence Morley	275	7.5	−0.3
Majority		970	26.3	+12.0
Turnout		3,691	29.9	−9.8
Liberal Democrats hold		Swing		

=== Heald Green Ward ===
Heald Green Ward
Party	Candidate	Votes	%	±%
Heald Green Ratepayers	Derek Whitehead	2,461	76.8	−1.3
Liberal Democrats	Patricia Carter	299	9.3	+2.2
Conservative	Haley Davenport	245	7.6	−0.5
Labour	Stephen William Moran	199	6.2	−0.5
Majority		2,162	67.5	−2.5
Turnout		3,204	31.7	−3.9
Heald Green Ratepayers hold		Swing		

=== Heaton Mersey Ward ===
Heaton Mersey Ward
Party	Candidate	Votes	%	±%
Conservative	Bryan Malcolm Lees	1,468	38.1	+9.3
Labour	Muhammad Junejo	1,451	37.7	−11.4
Liberal Democrats	Ronald Arthur Axtell	659	17.1	+8.2
Green	Anthony Eric Hardman	271	7.0	−6.2
Majority		17	0.4	N/A
Turnout		3,849	31.9	−6.6
Conservative gain from Labour		Swing		

=== Heaton Moor Ward ===
Heaton Moor Ward
Party	Candidate	Votes	%	±%
Conservative	Anthony O'Neill	1,633	47.9	+2.9
Labour	John Paul Humphries	1,070	31.4	−6.4
Liberal Democrats	Jonathan Rule	357	10.5	+2.0
UKIP	Gerald Price	193	5.7	+1.8
Green	Janet Cuff	158	4.6	+0.3
Majority		563	16.5	+9.3
Turnout		3,411	33.8	−5.0
Conservative hold		Swing		

=== Manor Ward ===
Manor Ward
Party	Candidate	Votes	%	±%
Liberal Democrats	Sue Derbyshire	1,400	53.8	+7.1
Labour	Brigitte Lechner	895	34.4	−5.6
Conservative	Barry Charlesworth	190	7.3	+1.6
Green	Ruth Lindsay-Dunn	115	4.4	+0.1
Majority		505	19.4	+12.7
Turnout		2,600	27.8	−6.1
Liberal Democrats hold		Swing		

=== Marple North Ward ===
Marple North Ward
Party	Candidate	Votes	%	±%
Liberal Democrats	Andrew Bispham	1,962	65.7	+5.0
Conservative	William Morley-Scott	770	25.8	+3.3
Labour	Gwendoline Mary Scott	253	8.5	−1.7
Majority		1,192	39.9	+8.4
Turnout		2,985	32.0	−5.3
Liberal Democrats hold		Swing		

=== Marple South and High Lane Ward ===
Marple South and High Lane Ward
Party	Candidate	Votes	%	±%
Liberal Democrats	Chris Baker	2,100	52.4	+1.9
Conservative	John Leck	1,585	39.6	−2.7
Green	Graham Douglas Reid	175	4.4	+0.9
Labour	Christopher John Shaw	147	3.7	−0.2
Majority		515	12.9	+4.9
Turnout		4,007	41.6	−1.4
Liberal Democrats hold		Swing		

=== Reddish North Ward ===
Reddish North Ward
Party	Candidate	Votes	%	±%
Labour	Peter Scott	1,492	67.1	−2.3
Conservative	Kathleen May Southwell	428	19.3	+1.5
Liberal Democrats	David Matthews	302	13.6	+0.8
Majority		1,064	47.9	−3.8
Turnout		2,222	18.7	−3.3
Labour hold		Swing		

=== Reddish South Ward ===
Reddish South Ward
Party	Candidate	Votes	%	±%
Labour	Joan Kidd	1,461	67.1	−2.6
Conservative	Stephen Burt	392	18.0	+1.4
Liberal Democrats	Patrick Buttle	324	14.9	+1.2
Majority		1,069	49.1	−4.0
Turnout		2,177	20.1	−4.6
Labour hold		Swing		

=== Romiley Ward ===
Romiley Ward
Party	Candidate	Votes	%	±%
Liberal Democrats	Mary Loftus	1,617	57.4	−2.3
Conservative	Glyn Idris Jones	700	24.8	−0.8
Labour	Charles John Hughes	356	12.6	−2.1
Green	Geoffrey Keith Entwistle	144	5.1	+5.1
Majority		917	32.6	+1.4
Turnout		2,817	25.8	−4.6
Liberal Democrats hold		Swing		
