= Brexit vote =

Brexit vote may refer to:

- 2016 United Kingdom European Union membership referendum, a popular referendum which resolved in favour of Brexit
- Meaningful vote, a parliamentary vote required to ratify the Brexit withdrawal agreement
