= Parliamentary votes on Brexit =

UK Parliament vote on Brexit

Parliamentary votes on Brexit, sometimes referred to as "meaningful votes", were the parliamentary votes under the terms of Section 13 of the United Kingdom's European Union (Withdrawal) Act 2018, which requires the government of the United Kingdom to bring forward an amendable parliamentary motion at the end of the Article 50 negotiations between the government and the European Union in order to ratify the Brexit withdrawal agreement.

The wording of the clause (Note: While going through Parliament, the amendment was relabelled with a variety of clause numbers as other amendments were added to or deleted from the Bill, but by the final version of the Bill, which received Royal Assent, it had become Section 13. In the United Kingdom, Acts of Parliament have sections, whereas in a Bill (which is put before Parliament to pass) those sections are called clauses.) was strongly contested by both the House of Commons and the House of Lords, with the Lords proposing an amendment to the bill giving further powers to parliament. When the bill returned to the Commons the Conservative government offered concessions and the Lords' proposed amendment was defeated. The bill was then passed into law on 26 June 2018.

By the end of March 2019, the government had not won any of the meaningful votes. This led to a series of non-binding "indicative votes" on potential options for Brexit, and the delay of the departure date until after the 2019 general election.

== History ==
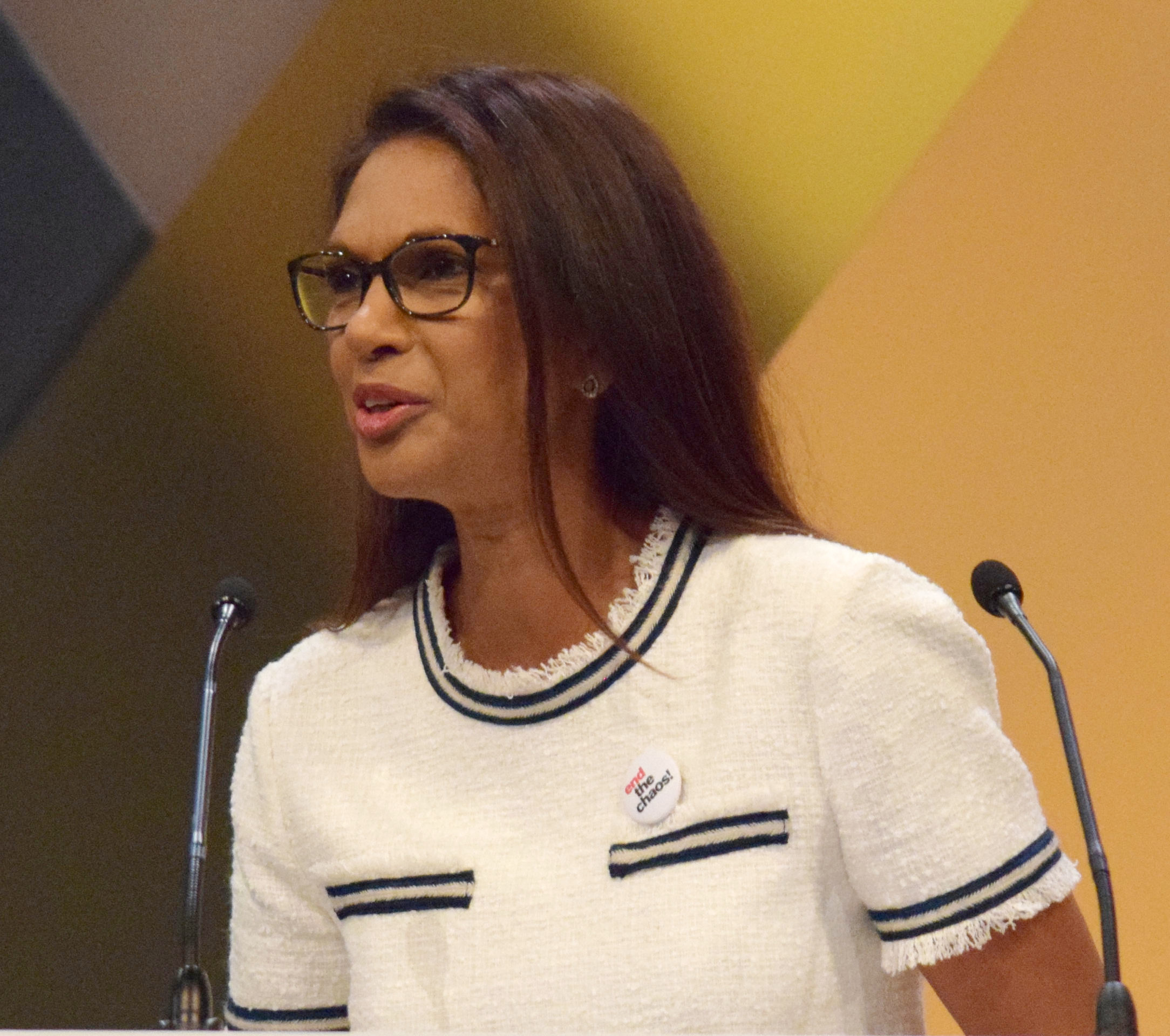
Gina Miller

=== Background ===
Following the UK's decision to leave the European Union, the result of an advisory referendum on 23 June 2016, the UK government invoked Article 50 of the Treaty on the European Union. The UK was thus due to leave the EU at 11 pm on 29 March 2019 UTC.

Gina Miller, a British businesswoman, took the government to court to challenge its authority to invoke Article 50 without reference to Parliament. On 3 November 2016, the High Court of Justice ruled in favour of Miller in the case R (Miller) v Secretary of State for Exiting the European Union.

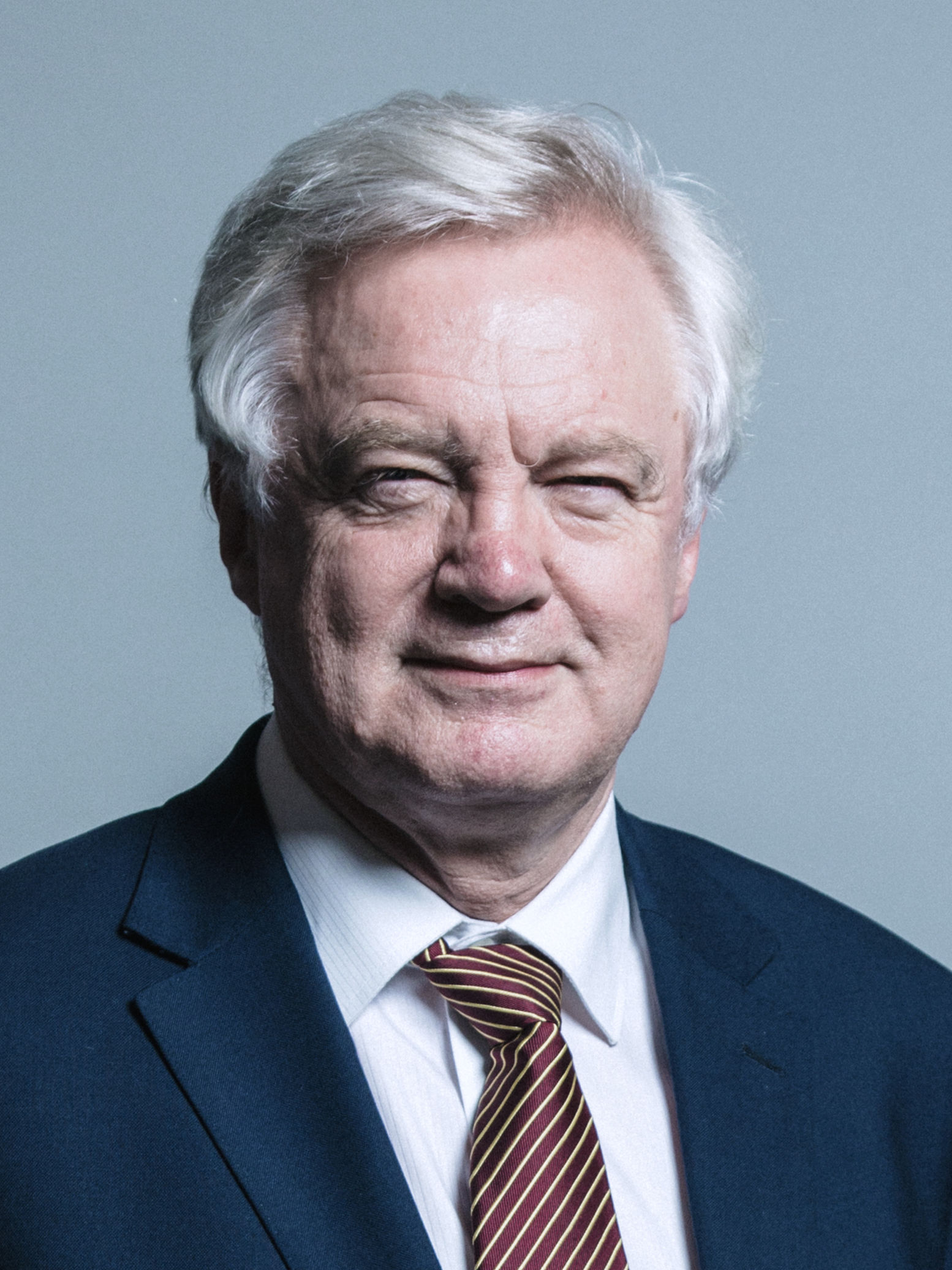
David Davis

In January 2017 the Conservative Prime Minister Theresa May announced, "I can confirm today that the Government will put the final deal that is agreed between the UK and the EU to a vote in both Houses of Parliament, before it comes into force." As a result, on 13 July 2017, David Davis, the Secretary of State for Exiting the European Union, introduced the bill in the Commons, including the following clause 9 statement:

9 Implementing the withdrawal agreement

(1) A Minister of the Crown may by regulations make such provision as the Minister considers appropriate for the purposes of implementing the withdrawal agreement if the Minister considers that such provision should be in force on or before exit day.

As a government bill, this first reading was pro forma, with the first debate taking place on the second reading.

On 18 April 2017 Theresa May announced a snap general election for 8 June 2017, with the aim of strengthening her hand in Brexit negotiations. This resulted in a hung parliament, in which the number of Conservative seats fell from 330 to 317, despite the party winning its highest vote share since 1983, prompting her to broker a confidence and supply deal with the Democratic Unionist Party (DUP) to support a minority government.

In July 2017 David Jones, Minister of State for Exiting the European Union, told the Commons he expected the parliamentary vote on the Brexit deal with the EU to happen "before the European Parliament debates and votes on the final agreement." Asked to clarify what would happen if MPs and members of the House of Lords decide they don't like the deal, Jones said "the vote will be either to accept the deal. Or there will be no deal." At an Exiting the European Union Select Committee meeting in October, Labour MP Seema Malhotra asked Davis, "The vote of our parliament, the UK parliament, could be after March 2019?", (Note: The UK was due to withdraw from the EU on 29 March 2019.) to which Davis replied, "Yes, it could be." This drew criticism from Labour opposition MPs and some Conservative MPs.

=== Alteration of Clause 9 ===
In December 2017 pressure grew on the government to amend clause 9 so that parliament would have approval of the final terms of the withdrawal deal between the UK and the EU prior to 29 March 2019, the date set for the UK's departure from the EU. Conservative MP Dominic Grieve advised the government to amend the clause themselves or he would table his own amendment to the bill. Grieve duly tabled his amendment to the bill (Amendment 7) requiring any Brexit deal to be enacted by statute, rather than implemented by government order.

Clause 9 was then introduced to the house as follows (Grieve's additions, amendment 7, in italics):

9 Implementing the withdrawal agreement

(1) A Minister of the Crown may by regulations make such provision as the Minister considers appropriate for the purposes of implementing the withdrawal agreement if the Minister considers that such provision should be in force on or before exit day, subject to the prior enactment of a statute by Parliament approving the final terms of withdrawal of the United Kingdom from the European Union.
(2) Regulations under this section may make any provision that could be made by an Act of Parliament (including modifying this Act).
(3) But regulations under this section may not—

(a) impose or increase taxation,
(b) make retrospective provision,
(c) create a relevant criminal offence, or
(d) amend, repeal or revoke the Human Rights Act 1998 or any subordinate legislation made under it.

(4) No regulations may be made under this section after exit day.

At the weekend prior to the Commons vote on the amendment, the leaders of the all-party parliamentary group on EU relations signed a statement saying, "Members of all parties have already provided valuable scrutiny to the EU (Withdrawal) bill, and we have forced the government into some concessions. But little of that will matter unless we can have a truly meaningful vote on the withdrawal agreement the government negotiates with the European Union."

On the morning of 13 December 2017 Davis issued a written statement saying, "In the UK, the Government has committed to hold a vote on the final deal in Parliament as soon as possible after the negotiations have concluded. This vote will take the form of a resolution in both Houses of Parliament and will cover both the Withdrawal Agreement and the terms for our future relationship."

External videos
- RT UK news report
- MPs pass amendment giving them 'meaningful' vote on Brexit deal via RT UK on YouTube

Later that day, at Prime Minister's Questions, the Conservative MP Anna Soubry requested that May accept Grieve's amendment, "The Prime Minister says that she wants a meaningful vote on Brexit before we leave the European Union. Even at this last moment, will she be so good as to accept my right hon. and learned Friend’s [Grieve's] amendment 7, in the spirit of unity for everybody here and in the country?" May rejected the idea, saying "We were very clear that we will not commence any statutory instruments until that meaningful vote has taken place, but as currently drafted [Grieve's draft] what the amendment says is that we should not put any of those arrangements and statutory instruments into place until the withdrawal agreement and implementation Bill has reached the statute book. That could be at a very late stage in the proceedings, which could mean we are not able to have the orderly and smooth exit from the European Union that we wish to have."

That evening, Grieve's amendment was passed by 309 votes to 305 votes – a majority of 4, representing a defeat for the government. Twelve Conservative MPs voted against the government: Grieve, Soubry, Heidi Allen, Kenneth Clarke, Jonathan Djanogly, Stephen Hammond, Oliver Heald, Nicky Morgan, Bob Neill, Antoinette Sandbach, John Stevenson and Sarah Wollaston. A month earlier, all but Stevenson were pictured along with fellow Conservative MPs Vicky Ford, Jeremy Lefroy, Paul Masterton and Tom Tugendhat on the front page of the Daily Telegraph describing them as "The Brexit Mutineers".

=== House of Lords Report Stage ===
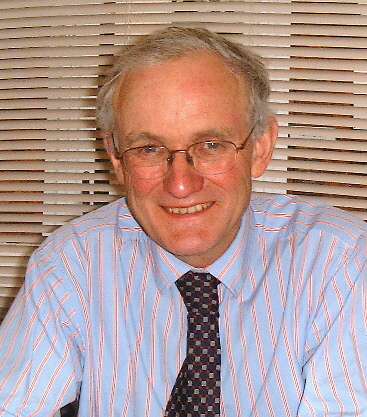
Viscount Hailsham

At the House of Lords Report Stage in April 2018, Viscount Hailsham introduced a new clause as follows:

Before Clause 9, insert the following new Clause—

n Parliamentary approval of the outcome of negotiations with the European Union

(1) Without prejudice to any other statutory provision relating to the withdrawal agreement, Her Majesty’s Government may conclude such an agreement only if a draft has been—

(a) approved by a resolution of the House of Commons, and
(b) subject to the consideration of a motion in the House of Lords.

(2) So far as practicable, a Minister of the Crown must make arrangements for the resolution provided for in subsection (1)(a) to be debated and voted on before the European Parliament has debated and voted on the draft withdrawal agreement.
(3) Her Majesty’s Government may implement a withdrawal agreement only if Parliament has approved the withdrawal agreement and any transitional measures agreed within or alongside it by an Act of Parliament.
(4) Subsection (5) applies in each case that any of the conditions in subsections (6) to (8) is met.
(5) Her Majesty’s Government must follow any direction in relation to the negotiations under Article 50(2) of the Treaty on European Union which has been—

(a) approved by a resolution of the House of Commons, and
(b) subject to the consideration of a motion in the House of Lords.

(6) The condition in this subsection is that the House of Commons has not approved the resolution required under subsection (1)(a) by 30 November 2018.
(7) The condition in this subsection is that the Act of Parliament required under subsection (3) has not received Royal Assent by 31 January 2019.
(8) The condition in this subsection is that no withdrawal agreement has been reached between the United Kingdom and the European Union by 28 February 2019.
(9) In this section, "withdrawal agreement" means an agreement (whether or not ratified) between the United Kingdom and the EU under Article 50(2) of the Treaty on European Union which sets out the arrangements for the United Kingdom’s withdrawal from the EU and the framework for the United Kingdom’s future relationship with the European Union."

The amendment with the new clause was passed by Lords by 335 to 244 – a majority of 91, which represented a further defeat for the government. The new wording would have given MPs the power to stop the UK from leaving the EU without a deal, or to make Theresa May return to negotiations.

=== Commons consideration of the Lords amendment ===
The government rejected the proposal by the Lords that would give the Commons the power to decide the next steps for the government if the withdrawal agreement were to be rejected by parliament.

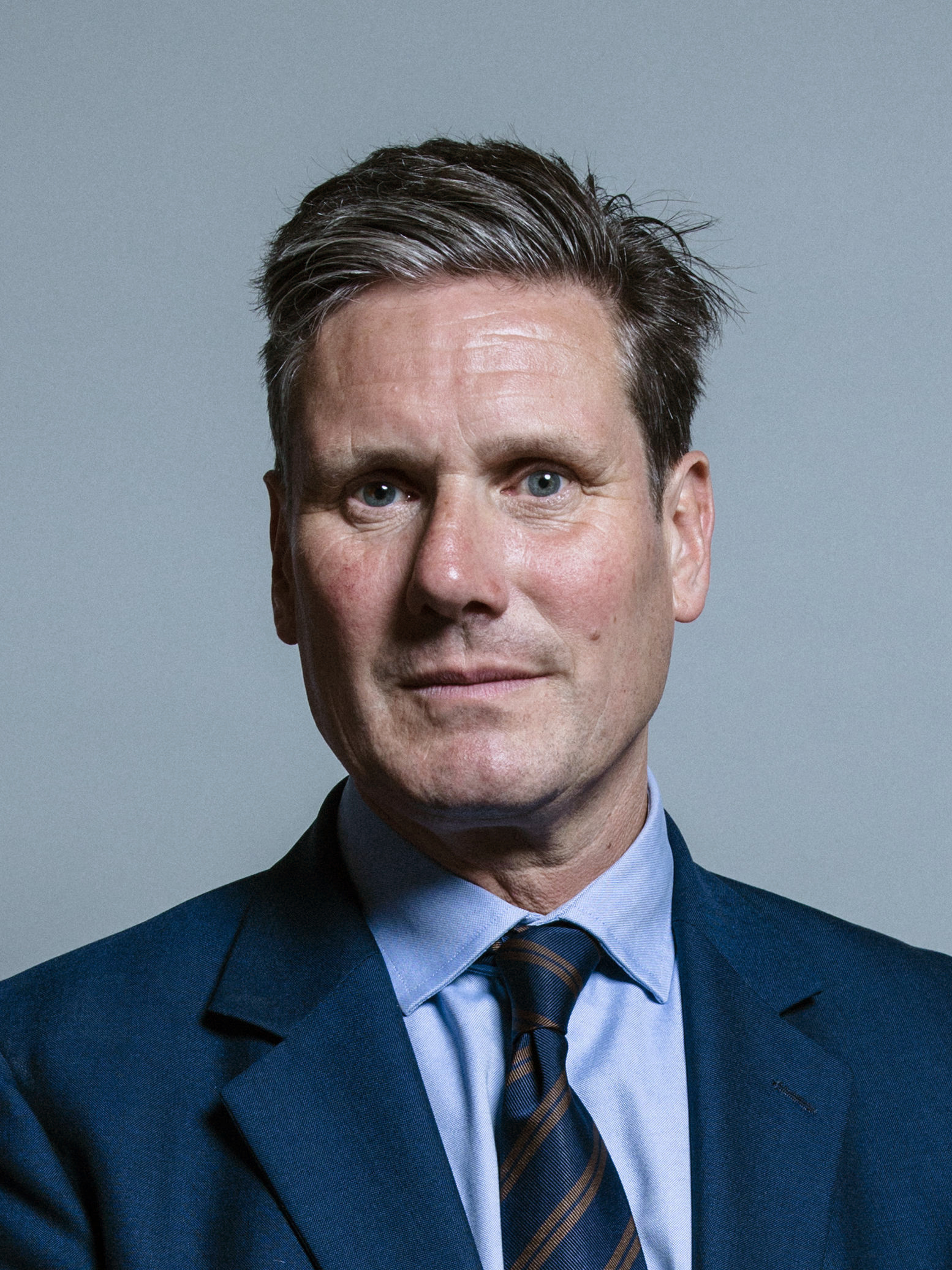
Keir Starmer

Labour MP Keir Starmer urged Conservative MPs who want Britain to remain in the EU to vote with Labour in favour of the Lords amendment when the bill returned to the Commons, and former Labour Prime Minister Gordon Brown suggested that May could be replaced by a new Tory Prime Minister if she lost the vote. The prominent Tory remainer Amber Rudd urged her party's MPs to back the government in the vote.

The process of parliamentary ping-pong then took place between 12 and 20 June 2018.

==== Alternative amendment by Dominic Grieve ====
The night before the bill was due back before the Commons, 11 June 2018, Dominic Grieve tabled a last-minute alternative amendment. The Lords amendment would prevent a 'no deal' scenario, and MPs and Lords could tell May to go back to the negotiating table and get something better, for example. Grieve's amendment also tackled the 'no deal' scenario but it set dates for May to come back to parliament and set out the government's intentions in the event of a 'no deal', and gain parliamentary approval for those plans.

Grieve's amendment:

(5A) Within seven days of a statement under subsection (4) being laid, a Minister of the Crown must move a motion in the House of Commons to seek approval of the Government’s approach.
(5B) In the event of no political agreement having been reached on a withdrawal agreement by the end of 30 November 2018, a Minister of the Crown must move a motion in the House of Commons setting out how the Government intends to proceed and seeking the approval of the House for that course of action.
(5C) If no political agreement has been reached on a withdrawal agreement by the end of 15 February 2019, the Government must bring the matter before both Houses of Parliament within five days and must follow any direction in relation to the negotiations under Article 50(2) of the Treaty of European Union which has been—

(a) approved by a resolution of the House of Commons, and
(b) the subject of a motion which has either been debated in the House of Lords, or upon which the House of Lords has not concluded a debate on the motion before the end of the period of five sitting days beginning with the first sitting day after the day on which the House of Commons passes the resolution mentioned in paragraph (a).

==== Commons rejection of Grieve's amendment ====
On the morning of the vote, 12 June 2018, the government rejected the alternative amendment by Grieve. This set the scene for disagreement during the Commons debate about whether or not parliament should have a say in the event of the UK leaving the EU without a deal. The morning also saw Phillip Lee's surprise resignation as a junior Tory minister saying, "If, in the future, I am to look my children in the eye and honestly say that I did my best for them I cannot, in all good conscience, support how our country’s current exit from the EU looks set to be delivered."

As the debate went on, the government gave assurances to potential Tory rebels that they would address their concerns in a new amendment for the Lords to consider. The concession offered by ministers was believed to include offering a new parliamentary motion if the Brexit deal was voted down by MPs and peers, which would open the door to MPs taking control of the negotiations if ministers failed to strike a deal in Brussels. The concession meant that the government won 324 votes to 298, a majority of 26.

==== Aftermath of the Commons rejection of Grieve's amendment ====
On the BBC's Newsnight, Grieve said that May must honour "assurances" she's given that Parliament will get a bigger say on any final Brexit deal. There was disagreement among Tories over what had been agreed, with Anna Soubry MP saying that, "the PM said yesterday that clause c of Dominic Grieve's amendment would be discussed as part of the new amendment to be tabled in the Lords", and Stephen Hammond MP writing, "Parliament must be able to have its say in a 'no deal' situation and we made this point very strongly today to the Government. The Government has conceded this point and I expect to see a new amendment to cover this situation soon."

A spokesperson for Downing Street claimed that the prime minister had agreed only to ongoing discussions, and Davis's Brexit department issued a statement which read: "We have not, and will not, agree to the House of Commons binding the Government’s hands in the negotiations." Tory MP Andrew Bridgen accused Tory remainers supportive of Grieve's amendment to the Brexit bill of deliberatively attempting to stop the UK leaving the EU completely.

Speaking the day after the vote, in the Commons at Prime Minister's Questions, May said, "We have seen concerns raised about the role of Parliament in relation to the Brexit process. What I agreed yesterday is that, as the Bill goes back to the Lords, we will have further discussions with colleagues over those concerns. This morning, I have agreed with the Brexit Secretary that we will bring forward an amendment in the Lords, and there are a number of things that will guide our approach in doing so... As my right hon. friend the Brexit Secretary made clear in the House yesterday, the Government’s hand in the negotiations cannot be tied by Parliament, but the Government must be accountable to Parliament. Government determines policy, and we then need parliamentary support to be able to implement that policy." Commenting, the BBC's Laura Kuenssberg said "The risk is that appears as double dealing."

==== Government's proposed amendment ====
On the evening of 14 June 2018 the government published its compromise amendment:

(5A) A Minister of the Crown must make arrangements for –

(a) a motion in neutral terms, to the effect that the House of Commons has considered the matter of the statement mentioned in subsection (4), to be moved in that House by a Minister of the Crown within the period of 7 Commons sitting days beginning with the day on which the statement is made, and
(b) a motion for the House of Lords to take note of the statement to be moved in that House by a Minister of the Crown within the period of 7 Lords sitting days beginning with the day on which the statement is made.

(5B) Subsection (5C) applies if the Prime Minister makes a statement before the end of 21 January 2019 that no agreement can be reached in negotiations under Article 50(2) of the Treaty on European Union on the substance of –

(a) the arrangements for the United Kingdom's withdrawal from the EU, and
(b) the framework for the future relationship between the EU and the United Kingdom after withdrawal.

(5C) A Minister of the Crown must, within a period of 14 days beginning with the day on which the statement mentioned in subsection (5B) is made –

(a) make a statement setting out how Her Majesty's Government proposes to proceed, and
(b) make arrangements for –

(i) a motion in neutral terms, to the effect that the House of Commons has considered the statement mentioned in paragraph (a), to be moved in that House by a Minister of the Crown within a period of 7 Commons sitting days beginning with the day on which the statement mentioned in paragraph (a) is made, and
(ii) a motion for the House of Lords to take note of the statement mentioned in paragraph (a) to be moved in that House by a Minister of the Crown within the period of 7 Lords sitting days beginning with the day on which the statement mentioned in paragraph (a) is made.

As of 15 June 2018, rebel Tory MPs were reportedly still unhappy with the amendment as it only allows the Commons "a motion in neutral terms" (5C)(b)(i). Grieve had originally wanted the amendment to say that the government must seek the approval of Parliament for its course of action, and that ministers must be directed by MPs and peers.

==== Re-tabling of Grieve’s amendment ====
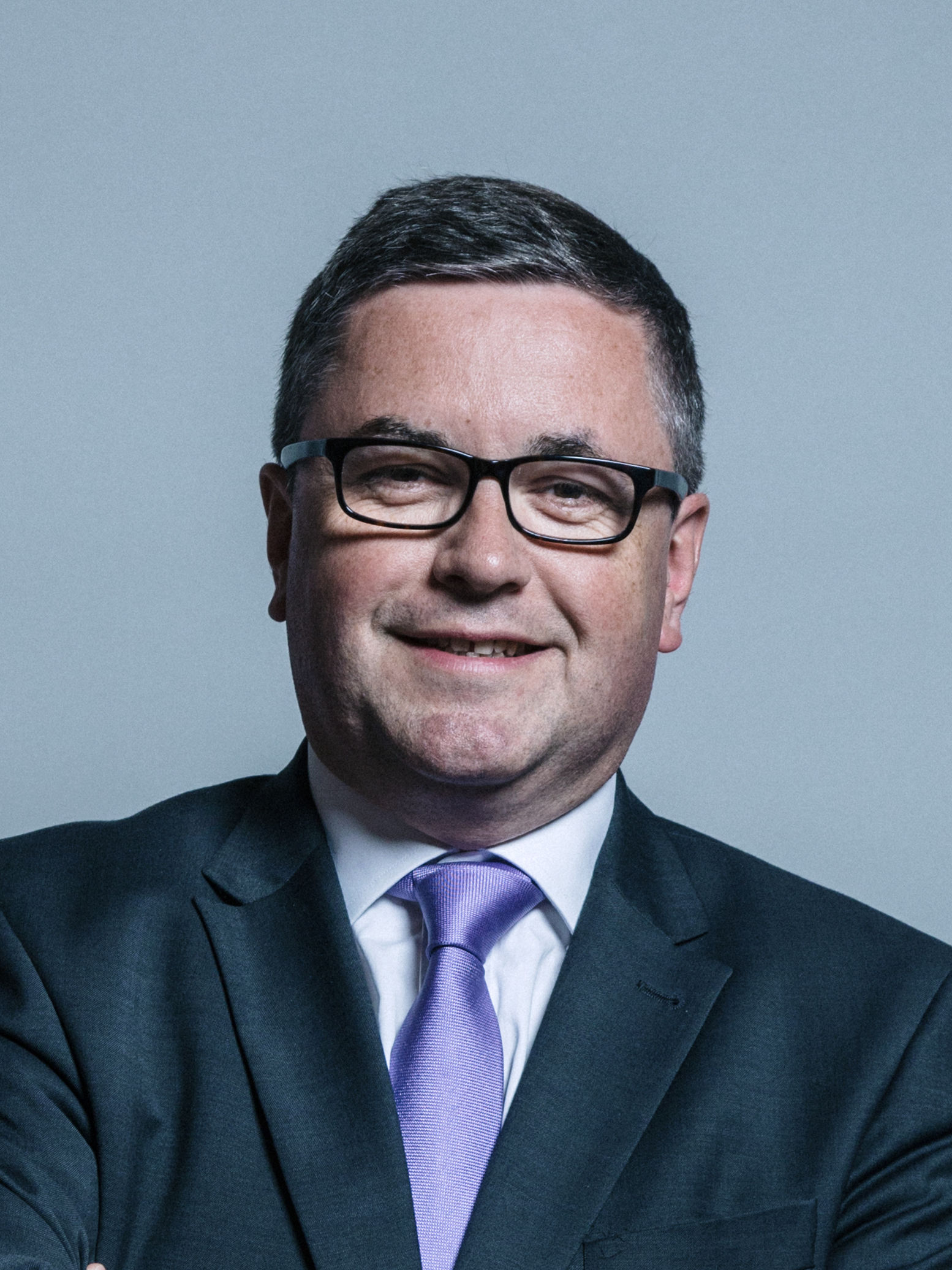
Robert Buckland

On the evening of 14 June 2018 Viscount Hailsham, who proposed the original amendment on the meaningful vote, re-tabled Grieve's amendment under his own name in the Lords in full. Speaking on the Sunday Politics programme, ahead of the amendment returning to the Lords, Grieve said, "The alternative is that we've all got to sign up to a slavery clause now saying, 'Whatever the government does when it comes to January, however potentially catastrophic it might be for my constituents and my country, I'm signing in blood now that I will follow over the edge of the cliff', and that, I can tell you, I am not prepared to do." Speaking on the same programme, the Solicitor General, Conservative MP Robert Buckland, replied, "If you were Michel Barnier and you were looking into the negotiation and looking into the future, it gives him a bit of a trump card to play when he knows that whatever the UK government might be saying to him now, he knows that at the end of it there's a third-party in this relationship, namely parliament, who are going to get involved and trump whatever the UK government say. Now that's not a good place for David Davis to be in. David Davis needs to be able to go out there and have a firm negotiating hand..."

On 18 June Lord Hailsham's amendment was passed by the Lords, a defeat for the government by 354 votes to 235: a majority of 119.

When the bill returned to the Commons on 20 June the government offered further concessions. The concessions meant that the government won by 319 votes to 303: a majority of 16.

Grieve said afterwards: "We’ve managed to reach a compromise without breaking the government – and I think some people don't realise we were getting quite close to that. I completely respect the view of my colleagues who disagree, but if we can compromise we can achieve more."

=== Full text ===
Final full text of section 13 as it appears in the European Union (Withdrawal) Act 2018

13 Parliamentary approval of the outcome of negotiations with the EU

(1) The withdrawal agreement may be ratified only if—

(a) a Minister of the Crown has laid before each House of Parliament—

(i) a statement that political agreement has been reached,

(ii) a copy of the negotiated withdrawal agreement, and

(iii) a copy of the framework for the future relationship,

(b) the negotiated withdrawal agreement and the framework for the future relationship have been approved by a resolution of the House of Commons on a motion moved by a Minister of the Crown,

(c) a motion for the House of Lords to take note of the negotiated withdrawal agreement and the framework for the future relationship has been tabled in the House of Lords by a Minister of the Crown and—

(i) the House of Lords has debated the motion, or

(ii) the House of Lords has not concluded a debate on the motion before the end of the period of five Lords sitting days beginning with the first Lords sitting day after the day on which the House of Commons passes the resolution mentioned in paragraph (b), and

(d) an Act of Parliament has been passed which contains provision for the implementation of the withdrawal agreement.

(2) So far as practicable, a Minister of the Crown must make arrangements for the motion mentioned in subsection (1)(b) to be debated and voted on by the House of Commons before the European Parliament decides whether it consents to the withdrawal agreement being concluded on behalf of the EU in accordance with Article 50(2) of the Treaty on European Union.

(3) Subsection (4) applies if the House of Commons decides not to pass the resolution mentioned in subsection (1)(b).

(4) A Minister of the Crown must, within the period of 21 days beginning with the day on which the House of Commons decides not to pass the resolution, make a statement setting out how Her Majesty's Government proposes to proceed in relation to negotiations for the United Kingdom's withdrawal from the EU under Article 50(2) of the Treaty on European Union.

(5) A statement under subsection (4) must be made in writing and be published in such manner as the Minister making it considers appropriate.

(6) A Minister of the Crown must make arrangements for—

(a) a motion in neutral terms, to the effect that the House of Commons has considered the matter of the statement mentioned in subsection (4), to be moved in that House by a Minister of the Crown within the period of seven Commons sitting days beginning with the day on which the statement is made, and

(b) a motion for the House of Lords to take note of the statement to be moved in that House by a Minister of the Crown within the period of seven Lords sitting days beginning with the day on which the statement is made.

(7) Subsection (8) applies if the Prime Minister makes a statement before the end of 21 January 2019 that no agreement in principle can be reached in negotiations under Article 50(2) of the Treaty on European Union on the substance of—

(a) the arrangements for the United Kingdom's withdrawal from the EU, and

(b) the framework for the future relationship between the EU and the United Kingdom after withdrawal.

(8) A Minister of the Crown must, within the period of 14 days beginning with the day on which the statement mentioned in subsection (7) is made—

(a) make a statement setting out how Her Majesty's Government proposes to proceed, and

(b) make arrangements for—

(i) a motion in neutral terms, to the effect that the House of Commons has considered the matter of the statement mentioned in paragraph (a), to be moved in that House by a Minister of the Crown within the period of seven Commons sitting days beginning with the day on which the statement mentioned in paragraph (a) is made, and

(ii) a motion for the House of Lords to take note of the statement mentioned in paragraph (a) to be moved in that House by a Minister of the Crown within the period of seven Lords sitting days beginning with the day on which the statement mentioned in paragraph (a) is made.

(9) A statement under subsection (7) or (8)(a) must be made in writing and be published in such manner as the Minister making it considers appropriate.

(10) Subsection (11) applies if, at the end of 21 January 2019, there is no agreement in principle in negotiations under Article 50(2) of the Treaty on European Union on the substance of—

(a) the arrangements for the United Kingdom's withdrawal from the EU, and

(b) the framework for the future relationship between the EU and the United Kingdom after withdrawal.

(11) A Minister of the Crown must, within the period of five days beginning with the end of 21 January 2019—

(a) make a statement setting out how Her Majesty's Government proposes to proceed, and

(b) make arrangements for—

(i) a motion in neutral terms, to the effect that the House of Commons has considered the matter of the statement mentioned in paragraph (a), to be moved in that House by a Minister of the Crown within the period of five Commons sitting days beginning with the end of 21 January 2019, and

(ii) a motion for the House of Lords to take note of the statement mentioned in paragraph (a) to be moved in that House by a Minister of the Crown within the period of five Lords sitting days beginning with the end of 21 January 2019.

(12) A statement under subsection (11)(a) must be made in writing and be published in such manner as the Minister making it considers appropriate

(13) For the purposes of this section—

(a) a statement made under subsection (4), (8)(a) or (11)(a) may be combined with a statement made under another of those provisions,

(b) a motion falling within subsection (6)(a), (8)(b)(i) or (11)(b)(i) may be combined into a single motion with another motion falling within another of those provisions, and

(c) a motion falling within subsection (6)(b), (8)(b)(ii) or (11)(b)(ii) may be combined into a single motion with another motion falling within another of those provisions.

(14) This section does not affect the operation of Part 2 of the Constitutional Reform and Governance Act 2010 (ratification of treaties) in relation to the withdrawal agreement.

(15) In subsection (1) "framework for the future relationship" means the document or documents identified, by the statement that political agreement has been reached, as reflecting the agreement in principle on the substance of the framework for the future relationship between the EU and the United Kingdom after withdrawal.

(16) In this section—

"Commons sitting day" means a day on which the House of Commons is sitting (and a day is only a day on which the House of Commons is sitting if the House begins to sit on that day);

"Lords sitting day" means a day on which the House of Lords is sitting (and a day is only a day on which the House of Lords is sitting if the House begins to sit on that day);

"negotiated withdrawal agreement" means the draft of the withdrawal agreement identified by the statement that political agreement has been reached;

"ratified", in relation to the withdrawal agreement, has the same meaning as it does for the purposes of Part 2 of the Constitutional Reform and Governance Act 2010 in relation to a treaty (see section 25 of that Act);

"statement that political agreement has been reached" means a statement made in writing by a Minister of the Crown which—

(a) states that, in the Minister's opinion, an agreement in principle has been reached in negotiations under Article 50(2) of the Treaty on European Union on the substance of—

(i) arrangements for the United Kingdom's withdrawal from the EU, and

(ii) the framework for the future relationship between the EU and the United Kingdom after withdrawal,

(b) identifies a draft of the withdrawal agreement which, in the Minister's opinion, reflects the agreement in principle so far as relating to the arrangements for withdrawal, and

(c) identifies one or more documents which, in the Minister's opinion, reflect the agreement in principle so far as relating to the framework.

=== 'Plan B' amendment ===
At the end of November 2018, May presented the draft agreement on a future relationship with Europe to the Commons after closing a 17-month negotiation with the EU. Consequently, the first use of the meaningful vote was scheduled for 11 December 2018.

If the UK parliament were to vote against the deal then the government would need to present an alternative, a 'Plan B'. As a result, Grieve tabled an amendment to the business motion addressing the procedure in the event parliament votes down the deal. The amendment states (change in italics):

(11) A Minister of the Crown must, within the period of five days beginning with the end of 21 January 2019—

(a) make a statement setting out how Her Majesty's Government proposes to proceed, and

(b) make arrangements for—

(i) a motion in neutral terms, to the effect that the House of Commons has considered the matter of the statement mentioned in paragraph (a), to be moved in that House by a Minister of the Crown within the period of five Commons sitting days beginning with the end of 21 January 2019, and

(ii) a motion for the House of Lords to take note of the statement mentioned in paragraph (a) to be moved in that House by a Minister of the Crown within the period of five Lords sitting days beginning with the end of 21 January 2019.

The provisions of Standing Order No. 24B (Amendments to motions to consider specified matters) shall not apply in respect of any motion tabled by a Minister of the Crown pursuant to any provision of section 13 of the European Union (Withdrawal) Act 2018.

Standing Order No. 24B states: "Where, in the opinion of the Speaker... a motion... is expressed in neutral terms, no amendments to it may be tabled. Grieve’s amendment disapplies this Standing Order to any motion moved under the meaningful vote section of the Act, which would make any motion relating to the withdrawal process amendable by parliament.

The success of Grieve's amendment (passed 321 votes to 299) means MPs can now change that motion, giving them far greater say over the UK's exit from the EU.

==== "Three-day" amendment ====
Section 13 of the 2018 Act provides that:

(1) The withdrawal agreement may be ratified only if—

(b) the negotiated withdrawal agreement and the framework for the future relationship have been approved by a resolution of the House of Commons on a motion moved by a Minister of the Crown.

On 4 December 2018 the government tabled a business motion to set out the timetable for the meaningful vote, as required by S13(1)(b), with the vote scheduled for 11 December 2018.

Business motion setting out timetable for implementation of Section 13(1)(b) of the European Union (Withdrawal) Act 2018

That the following provisions shall have effect. Sitting arrangements

(1) In this Order—

‘European Union withdrawal motion’ means a motion in the name of a Minister of the Crown under section 13(1)(b) of the European Union (Withdrawal) Act 2018; and ‘allotted day’ means a day on which the first Government business is the European Union withdrawal motion.

(2) The allotted days shall be Tuesday 4 December, Wednesday 5 December, Thursday 6 December, Monday 10 December and Tuesday 11 December.
(3) On this day, proceedings on the European Union withdrawal motion may be proceeded with for up to eight hours from the commencement of proceedings on the Business of the House (Section 13(1)(b) of the European Union (Withdrawal) Act 2018) motion.
(4) On the second, third and fourth allotted days, proceedings on the European Union withdrawal motion may be proceeded with for up to eight hours from the commencement of proceedings on the European Union withdrawal motion.

Decisions on any amendments

(5) No amendment to the European Union withdrawal motion may be selected before the final allotted day.
(6) In respect of the European Union withdrawal motion, the Speaker may select up to six amendments of which notice has been given.
(7) If, on the final allotted day, an amendment to the European Union withdrawal motion has been disposed of at or after the moment of interruption, any further amendments selected by the Speaker in accordance with the provisions of paragraph 6 of this Order may be moved, and the questions thereon shall be put forthwith.
(8) Questions under this Order may be put after the moment of interruption; and Standing Order No. 41A (Deferred divisions) shall not apply.

General

(9) No motion to vary or supplement the provisions of this Order shall be made except by a Minister of the Crown; and the question on any such motion shall be put forthwith.
(10) On an allotted day—

(a) no Emergency Debate shall be taken in accordance with Standing Order No. 24;
(b) no dilatory motion shall be made in relation to the proceedings on the European Union withdrawal motion except by a Minister of the Crown; and the question on any such motion shall be put forthwith;
(c) no motion shall be proposed under Standing Order No. 36 (Closure of debate) except by a Minister of the Crown; and
(d) no motion shall be proposed that the question be not now put.

On 9 January 2019 the government revised the timetable in light of the vote on 11 December 2018 being cancelled.

Revised business motion setting out timetable for implementation of Section 13(1)(b) of the European Union (Withdrawal) Act 2018, changes in italics

That the following provisions shall have effect. Sitting arrangements

(1) In this Order—

‘European Union withdrawal motion’ means a motion in the name of a Minister of the Crown under section 13(1)(b) of the European Union (Withdrawal) Act 2018; and ‘allotted day’ means a day on which the first Government business is the European Union withdrawal motion.

(2)

(a) The House shall sit on Friday 11 January.
(b) The allotted days shall be Tuesday 4 December, Wednesday 5 December, Thursday 6 December, Monday 10 December, Wednesday 9 January, Thursday 10 January, Friday 11 January, Monday 14 January and Tuesday 15 January.

(3) On this day and the fifth allotted day, proceedings on the European Union withdrawal motion may be proceeded with for up to eight hours from the commencement of proceedings on a Business of the House (Section 13(1)(b) of the European Union (Withdrawal) Act 2018) motion.
(4) On the second, third, fourth, sixth and eighth allotted days, proceedings on the European Union withdrawal motion may be proceeded with for up to eight hours from the commencement of proceedings on the European Union withdrawal motion.

Decisions on any amendments

(5) No amendment to the European Union withdrawal motion may be selected before the final allotted day.
(6) In respect of the European Union withdrawal motion, the Speaker may select any number of amendments of which notice has been given.
(7) On the final allotted day, the Speaker shall put the questions necessary to dispose of proceedings on the European Union withdrawal motion at 7.00pm; and such questions shall include the questions on any amendments selected by the Speaker in accordance with the provisions of paragraph 6 of this Order which may then be moved.
(8) Questions under this Order may be put after the moment of interruption; and Standing Order No. 41A (Deferred divisions) shall not apply.

General

(9) No motion to vary or supplement the provisions of this Order shall be made except by a Minister of the Crown; and the question on any such motion shall be put forthwith;

(a) Notwithstanding the practice of this House, a Member may be called to speak twice to the Question on the European Union withdrawal motion without the leave of the House.

(10) On an allotted day—

(a) no Emergency Debate shall be taken in accordance with Standing Order No. 24;
(b) no dilatory motion shall be made in relation to the proceedings on the European Union withdrawal motion except by a Minister of the Crown; and the question on any such motion shall be put forthwith;
(c) no motion shall be proposed under Standing Order No. 36 (Closure of debate) except by a Minister of the Crown; and
(d) no motion shall be proposed that the question be not now put.

Grieve was successful in another amendment to the revised timetable (change in italics):

(7) On the final allotted day, the Speaker shall put the questions necessary to dispose of proceedings on the European Union withdrawal motion at 7.00pm; and such questions shall include the questions on any amendments selected by the Speaker in accordance with the provisions of paragraph 6 of this Order which may then be moved. In the event of the motion under Section 13(1)(b) being negatived or amended so as to be negatived, a Minister of the Crown shall table within three sitting days a motion under Section 13, considering the process of exiting the European Union under Article 50.

This meant that when the government lost the delayed meaningful vote on 15 January 2019 it had three sitting days (until 21 January 2019) to produce its 'Plan B'.

== Votes during the 57th Parliament of the United Kingdom (2017–19) ==
=== First "meaningful vote" (15 January 2019) ===
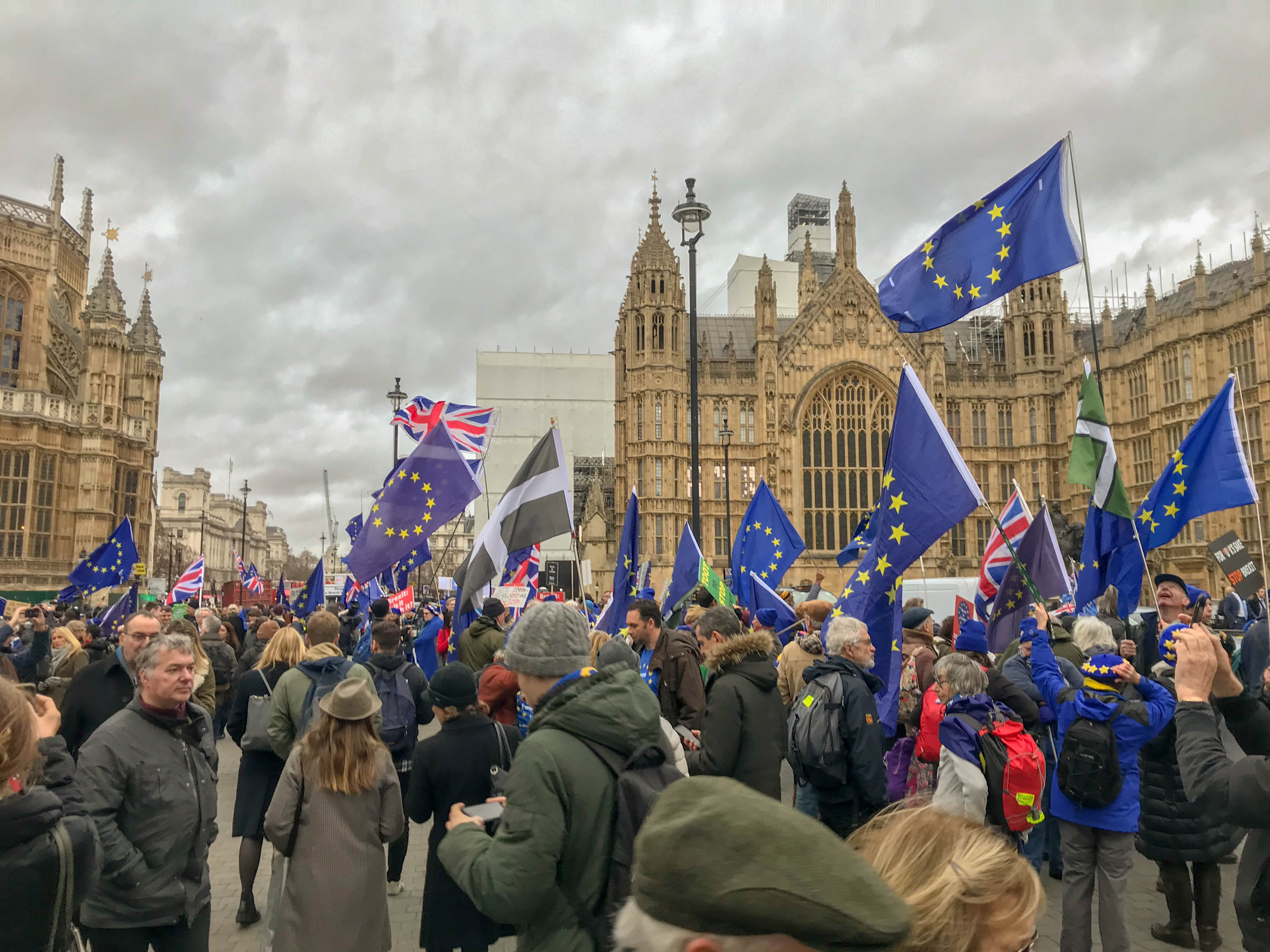
Protesters near the Palace of Westminster, shortly before the first meaningful vote on 15 January 2019.

The meaningful vote took place in the House of Commons on 15 January 2019. The vote was originally scheduled to be held on 11 December 2018 but on 10 December, May postponed it because it became clear the government's Brexit deal would be voted down.

In the absence of any significant changes in the positions of the political parties, as expected, the government was defeated in the 15 January vote by 432 votes to 202. The 230-vote margin of defeat was the worst for any government in modern Parliamentary history. 196 Conservative MPs, 3 Labour MPs and 3 independent MPs supported the deal. Voting against the deal were 118 Conservative MPs, 248 Labour MPs, all 35 SNP MPs, all 11 Liberal Democrat MPs, all 10 DUP MPs, all 4 Plaid Cymru MPs, the sole Green MP, and 5 independent MPs.

The three Labour MPs who voted for the deal were Ian Austin, Kevin Barron, and John Mann. The three independent MPs who voted for the deal were Lady Hermon (elected as an independent), Frank Field (elected as Labour), and Stephen Lloyd (elected as a Liberal Democrat). The five independent MPs who voted against the deal were John Woodcock, Jared O'Mara, Kelvin Hopkins, Ivan Lewis, and Fiona Onasanya, all of whom had been elected as Labour.

Abstaining were one Labour MP (Paul Flynn, absent due to prolonged illness), all seven Sinn Féin MPs, who follow a policy of abstentionism, and eight others: the Speaker John Bercow, the Deputy Speakers Eleanor Laing (Conservative), Lindsay Hoyle (Labour) and Rosie Winterton (Labour); furthermore, the tellers' votes are not taken into account (for the Ayes, Wendy Morton and Iain Stewart, both Conservative, and for the Noes, Vicky Foxcroft and Nick Smith, both Labour).

Full results

Ayes (202)

- Conservative (196)
- Nigel Adams, Selby and Ainsty
- Bim Afolami, Hitchin and Harpenden
- Peter Aldous, Waveney
- Stuart Andrew, Pudsey
- Edward Argar, Charnwood
- Victoria Atkins, Louth and Horncastle
- Kemi Badenoch, Saffron Walden
- Harriett Baldwin, West Worcestershire
- Steve Barclay, North East Cambridgeshire
- Henry Bellingham, North West Norfolk
- Richard Benyon, Newbury
- Paul Beresford, Mole Valley
- Jake Berry, Rossendale and Darwen
- Nick Boles, Grantham and Stamford
- Peter Bottomley, Worthing West
- Andrew Bowie, West Aberdeenshire and Kincardine
- Karen Bradley, Staffordshire Moorlands
- Jack Brereton, Stoke-on-Trent South
- Steve Brine, Winchester
- James Brokenshire, Old Bexley and Sidcup
- Robert Buckland, South Swindon
- Alex Burghart, Brentwood and Ongar
- Alistair Burt, North East Bedfordshire
- Alun Cairns, Vale of Glamorgan
- James Cartlidge, South Suffolk
- Alex Chalk, Cheltenham
- Jo Churchill, Bury St Edmunds
- Colin Clark, Gordon
- Greg Clark, Tunbridge Wells
- Ken Clarke, Rushcliffe
- James Cleverly, Braintree
- Geoffrey Clifton-Brown, The Cotswolds
- Thérèse Coffey, Suffolk Coastal
- Alberto Costa, South Leicestershire
- Geoffrey Cox, Torridge and West Devon
- Stephen Crabb, Preseli Pembrokeshire
- Chris Davies, Brecon and Radnorshire
- David T.C. Davies, Monmouth
- Glyn Davies, Montgomeryshire
- Mims Davies, Eastleigh
- Caroline Dinenage, Gosport
- Jonathan Djanogly, Huntingdon
- Leo Docherty, Aldershot
- Michelle Donelan, Chippenham
- Oliver Dowden, Hertsmere
- Jackie Doyle-Price, Thurrock
- David Duguid, Banff and Buchan
- Alan Duncan, Rutland and Melton
- Philip Dunne, Ludlow
- Michael Ellis, Northampton North
- Tobias Ellwood, Bournemouth East
- George Eustice, Camborne and Redruth
- Mark Field, Cities of London and Westminster
- Vicky Ford, Chelmsford
- Kevin Foster, Torbay
- Liam Fox, North Somerset
- Lucy Frazer, South East Cambridgeshire
- George Freeman, Mid Norfolk
- Mike Freer, Finchley and Golders Green
- Roger Gale, North Thanet
- Mark Garnier, Wyre Forest
- David Gauke, South West Hertfordshire
- Nus Ghani, Wealden
- Nick Gibb, Bognor Regis and Littlehampton
- Cheryl Gillan, Chesham and Amersham
- John Glen, Salisbury
- Robert Goodwill, Scarborough and Whitby
- Michael Gove, Surrey Heath
- Luke Graham, Ochil and South Perthshire
- Richard Graham, Gloucester
- Bill Grant, Ayr, Carrick and Cumnock
- Helen Grant, Maidstone and The Weald
- Chris Grayling, Epsom and Ewell
- Damian Green, Ashford
- Andrew Griffiths, Burton
- Kirstene Hair, Angus
- Luke Hall, Thornbury and Yate
- Philip Hammond, Runnymede and Weybridge
- Stephen Hammond, Wimbledon
- Matt Hancock, West Suffolk
- Richard Harrington, Watford
- Rebecca Harris, Castle Point
- Trudy Harrison, Copeland
- Simon Hart, Carmarthen West and South Pembrokeshire
- Oliver Heald, North East Hertfordshire
- James Heappey, Wells
- Chris Heaton-Harris, Daventry
- Peter Heaton-Jones, North Devon
- Nick Herbert, Arundel and South Downs
- Damian Hinds, East Hampshire
- Simon Hoare, North Dorset
- George Hollingbery, Meon Valley
- Kevin Hollinrake, Thirsk and Malton
- John Howell, Henley
- Nigel Huddleston, Mid Worcestershire
- Jeremy Hunt, South West Surrey
- Nick Hurd, Ruislip, Northwood and Pinner
- Alister Jack, Dumfries and Galloway
- Margot James, Stourbridge
- Sajid Javid, Bromsgrove
- Robert Jenrick, Newark
- Caroline Johnson, Sleaford and North Hykeham
- Andrew Jones, Harrogate and Knaresborough
- Marcus Jones, Nuneaton
- Gillian Keegan, Chichester
- Seema Kennedy, South Ribble
- Stephen Kerr, Stirling
- Julian Knight, Solihull
- Kwasi Kwarteng, Spelthorne
- Mark Lancaster, Milton Keynes North
- Andrea Leadsom, South Northamptonshire
- Jeremy Lefroy, Stafford
- Edward Leigh, Gainsborough
- Oliver Letwin, West Dorset
- Brandon Lewis, Great Yarmouth
- David Lidington, Aylesbury
- Jack Lopresti, Filton and Bradley Stoke
- Rachel Maclean, Redditch
- Alan Mak, Havant
- Kit Malthouse, North West Hampshire
- Paul Masterton, East Renfrewshire
- Theresa May, Maidenhead
- Paul Maynard, Blackpool North and Cleveleys
- Patrick McLoughlin, Derbyshire Dales
- Mark Menzies, Fylde
- Huw Merriman, Bexhill and Battle
- Maria Miller, Basingstoke
- Amanda Milling, Cannock Chase
- Anne Milton, Guildford
- Penny Mordaunt, Portsmouth North
- Nicky Morgan, Loughborough
- David Morris, Morecambe and Lunesdale
- James Morris, Halesowen and Rowley Regis
- David Mundell, Dumfriesshire, Clydesdale and Tweeddale
- Andrew Murrison, South West Wiltshire
- Bob Neill, Bromley and Chislehurst
- Sarah Newton, Truro and Falmouth
- Caroline Nokes, Romsey and Southampton North
- Jesse Norman, Hereford and South Herefordshire
- Neil O'Brien, Harborough
- Guy Opperman, Hexham
- Neil Parish, Tiverton and Honiton
- Mark Pawsey, Rugby
- John Penrose, Weston-super-Mare
- Andrew Percy, Brigg and Goole
- Claire Perry, Devizes
- Chris Philp, Croydon South
- Christopher Pincher, Tamworth
- Dan Poulter, Central Suffolk and North Ipswich
- Rebecca Pow, Taunton Deane
- Victoria Prentis, Banbury
- Mark Prisk, Hertford and Stortford
- Jeremy Quin, Horsham
- Mary Robinson, Cheadle
- Amber Rudd, Hastings and Rye
- David Rutley, Macclesfield
- Antoinette Sandbach, Eddisbury
- Paul Scully, Sutton and Cheam
- Bob Seely, Isle of Wight
- Andrew Selous, South West Bedfordshire
- Alok Sharma, Reading West
- Alec Shelbrooke, Elmet and Rothwell
- Keith Simpson, Broadland
- Chris Skidmore, Kingswood
- Chloe Smith, Norwich North
- Julian Smith, Skipton and Ripon
- Nicholas Soames, Mid Sussex
- Caroline Spelman, Meriden
- Mark Spencer, Sherwood
- Andrew Stephenson, Pendle
- John Stevenson, Carlisle
- Rory Stewart, Penrith and The Border
- Gary Streeter, South West Devon
- Mel Stride, Central Devon
- Graham Stuart, Beverley and Holderness
- Rishi Sunak, Richmond (Yorks)
- Desmond Swayne, New Forest West
- Maggie Throup, Erewash
- Kelly Tolhurst, Rochester and Strood
- Justin Tomlinson, North Swindon
- David Tredinnick, Bosworth
- Liz Truss, South West Norfolk
- Tom Tugendhat, Tonbridge and Malling
- Ed Vaizey, Wantage
- Charles Walker, Broxbourne
- Robin Walker, Worcester
- Ben Wallace, Wyre and Preston North
- David Warburton, Somerton and Frome
- Matt Warman, Boston and Skegness
- Helen Whately, Faversham and Mid Kent
- Heather Wheeler, South Derbyshire
- Craig Whittaker, Calder Valley
- Gavin Williamson, South Staffordshire
- Mike Wood, Dudley South
- Jeremy Wright, Kenilworth and Southam
- Nadhim Zahawi, Stratford-on-Avon
- Independent (3)
- Frank Field, Birkenhead
- Sylvia Hermon, North Down
- Stephen Lloyd, Eastbourne
- Labour (3)
- Ian Austin, Dudley North
- Kevin Barron, Rother Valley
- John Mann, Bassetlaw

Noes (432)

- Conservative (118)
- Adam Afriyie, Windsor
- Lucy Allan, Telford
- Heidi Allen, South Cambridgeshire
- David Amess, Southend West
- Richard Bacon, South Norfolk
- Steve Baker, Wycombe
- John Baron, Basildon and Billericay
- Guto Bebb, Aberconwy
- Bob Blackman, Harrow East
- Crispin Blunt, Reigate
- Peter Bone, Wellingborough
- Ben Bradley, Mansfield
- Graham Brady, Altrincham and Sale West
- Suella Braverman, Fareham
- Andrew Bridgen, North West Leicestershire
- Fiona Bruce, Congleton
- Conor Burns, Bournemouth West
- Bill Cash, Stone
- Maria Caulfield, Lewes
- Rehman Chishti, Gillingham and Rainham
- Christopher Chope, Christchurch
- Simon Clarke, Middlesbrough South and East Cleveland
- Damian Collins, Folkestone and Hythe
- Robert Courts, Witney
- Tracey Crouch, Chatham and Aylesford
- Philip Davies, Shipley
- David Davis, Haltemprice and Howden
- Nadine Dorries, Mid Bedfordshire
- Steve Double, St Austell and Newquay
- Richard Drax, South Dorset
- James Duddridge, Rochford and Southend East
- Iain Duncan Smith, Chingford and Woodford Green
- Charlie Elphicke, Dover
- Nigel Evans, Ribble Valley
- David Evennett, Bexleyheath and Crayford
- Michael Fabricant, Lichfield
- Michael Fallon, Sevenoaks
- Mark Francois, Rayleigh and Wickford
- Marcus Fysh, Yeovil
- Zac Goldsmith, Richmond Park (Surrey)
- James Gray, North Wiltshire
- Chris Green, Bolton West
- Justine Greening, Putney
- Dominic Grieve, Beaconsfield
- Sam Gyimah, East Surrey
- Robert Halfon, Harlow
- Greg Hands, Chelsea and Fulham
- Mark Harper, Forest of Dean
- John Hayes, South Holland and The Deepings
- Gordon Henderson, Sittingbourne and Sheppey
- Philip Hollobone, Kettering
- Adam Holloway, Gravesham
- Eddie Hughes, Walsall North
- Ranil Jayawardena, North East Hampshire
- Bernard Jenkin, Harwich and North Essex
- Andrea Jenkyns, Morley and Outwood
- Boris Johnson, Uxbridge and South Ruislip
- Gareth Johnson, Dartford
- Jo Johnson, Orpington
- David Jones, Clwyd West
- Daniel Kawczynski, Shrewsbury and Atcham
- Greg Knight, East Yorkshire
- John Lamont, Berwickshire, Roxburgh and Selkirk
- Pauline Latham, Mid Derbyshire
- Phillip Lee, Bracknell
- Andrew Lewer, Northampton South
- Julian Lewis, New Forest East
- Ian Liddell-Grainger, Bridgwater and West Somerset
- Julia Lopez, Hornchurch and Upminster
- Jonathan Lord, Woking
- Tim Loughton, East Worthing and Shoreham
- Craig Mackinlay, South Thanet
- Anne Main, St Albans
- Scott Mann, North Cornwall
- Stephen McPartland, Stevenage
- Esther McVey, Tatton
- Johnny Mercer, Plymouth, Moor View
- Stephen Metcalfe, South Basildon and East Thurrock
- Nigel Mills, Amber Valley
- Andrew Mitchell, Sutton Coldfield
- Damien Moore, Southport
- Anne Marie Morris, Newton Abbot
- Sheryll Murray, South East Cornwall
- Matthew Offord, Hendon
- Priti Patel, Witham
- Owen Paterson, North Shropshire
- Mike Penning, Hemel Hempstead
- Mark Pritchard, The Wrekin
- Tom Pursglove, Corby
- Will Quince, Colchester
- Dominic Raab, Esher and Walton
- John Redwood, Wokingham
- Jacob Rees-Mogg, North East Somerset
- Laurence Robertson, Tewkesbury
- Andrew Rosindell, Romford
- Douglas Ross, Moray
- Lee Rowley, North East Derbyshire
- Grant Shapps, Welwyn Hatfield
- Henry Smith, Crawley
- Royston Smith, Southampton Itchen
- Anna Soubry, Broxtowe
- Bob Stewart, Beckenham
- Julian Sturdy, York Outer
- Hugo Swire, East Devon
- Robert Syms, Poole
- Derek Thomas, St Ives
- Ross Thomson, Aberdeen South
- Michael Tomlinson, Mid Dorset and North Poole
- Craig Tracey, North Warwickshire
- Anne-Marie Trevelyan, Berwick-upon-Tweed
- Shailesh Vara, North West Cambridgeshire
- Martin Vickers, Cleethorpes
- Theresa Villiers, Chipping Barnet
- Giles Watling, Clacton
- John Whittingdale , Maldon
- Bill Wiggin, North Herefordshire
- Sarah Wollaston, Totnes
- William Wragg, Hazel Grove
- Democratic Unionist Party (10)
- Gregory Campbell, East Londonderry
- Nigel Dodds, Belfast North
- Jeffrey Donaldson, Lagan Valley
- Paul Girvan, South Antrim
- Emma Little-Pengelly, Belfast South
- Ian Paisley, North Antrim
- Gavin Robinson, Belfast East
- Jim Shannon, Strangford
- David Simpson, Upper Bann
- Sammy Wilson, East Antrim
- Green (1)
- Caroline Lucas, Brighton Pavilion
- Independent (5)
- Kelvin Hopkins, Luton North
- Ivan Lewis, Bury South
- Jared O'Mara, Sheffield Hallam
- Fiona Onasanya, Peterborough
- John Woodcock, Barrow and Furness
- Labour (248)
- Diane Abbott, Hackney North and Stoke Newington
- Debbie Abrahams, Oldham East and Saddleworth
- Rushanara Ali, Bethnal Green and Bow
- Rosena Allin-Khan, Tooting
- Mike Amesbury, Weaver Vale
- Tonia Antoniazzi, Gower
- Jon Ashworth, Leicester South
- Adrian Bailey, West Bromwich West
- Margaret Beckett, Derby South
- Hilary Benn, Leeds Central
- Luciana Berger, Liverpool Riverside
- Clive Betts, Sheffield South East
- Roberta Blackman-Woods, City of Durham
- Paul Blomfield, Sheffield Central
- Tracy Brabin, Batley and Spen
- Ben Bradshaw, Exeter
- Kevin Brennan, Cardiff West
- Lyn Brown, West Ham
- Nick Brown, Newcastle-upon-Tyne East and Wallsend
- Chris Bryant, Rhondda
- Karen Buck, Westminster North
- Richard Burden, Birmingham Northfield
- Richard Burgon, Leeds East
- Dawn Butler, Brent Central
- Liam Byrne, Birmingham Hodge Hill
- Ruth Cadbury, Brentford and Isleworth
- Alan Campbell, Tynemouth
- Ronnie Campbell, Blyth Valley
- Dan Carden, Liverpool Walton
- Sarah Champion, Rotherham
- Jenny Chapman, Darlington
- Bambos Charalambous, Enfield Southgate
- Ann Clwyd, Cynon Valley
- Vernon Coaker, Gedling
- Ann Coffey, Stockport
- Julie Cooper, Burnley
- Rosie Cooper, West Lancashire
- Yvette Cooper, Normanton, Pontefract and Castleford
- Jeremy Corbyn, Islington North
- Neil Coyle, Bermondsey and Old Southwark
- David Crausby, Bolton North East
- Mary Creagh, Wakefield
- Stella Creasy, Walthamstow
- Jon Cruddas, Dagenham and Rainham
- John Cryer, Leyton and Wanstead
- Judith Cummins, Bradford South
- Alex Cunningham, Stockton North
- Jim Cunningham, Coventry South
- Janet Daby, Lewisham East
- Nic Dakin, Scunthorpe
- Wayne David, Caerphilly
- Geraint Davies Swansea West
- Marsha de Cordova, Battersea
- Gloria De Piero, Ashfield
- Thangam Debbonaire, Bristol West
- Emma Dent Coad, Kensington
- Tanmanjeet Singh Dhesi, Slough
- Anneliese Dodds, Oxford East
- Stephen Doughty, Cardiff South and Penarth
- Peter Dowd, Bootle
- David Drew, Stroud
- Jack Dromey, Birmingham Erdington
- Rosie Duffield, Canterbury
- Angela Eagle, Wallasey
- Maria Eagle, Garston and Halewood
- Clive Efford, Eltham
- Julie Elliott, Sunderland Central
- Louise Ellman, Liverpool Riverside
- Chris Elmore, Ogmore
- Bill Esterson, Sefton Central
- Chris Evans, Islwyn
- Paul Farrelly, Newcastle-under-Lyme
- Jim Fitzpatrick Poplar and Limehouse
- Colleen Fletcher, Coventry North East
- Caroline Flint, Don Valley
- Yvonne Fovargue, Makerfield
- James Frith, Bury North
- Gill Furniss, Sheffield Brightside and Hillsborough
- Hugh Gaffney, Coatbridge, Chryston and Bellshill
- Mike Gapes, Ilford South
- Barry Gardiner, Brent North
- Ruth George, High Peak
- Preet Gill, Birmingham Edgbaston
- Mary Glindon, North Tyneside
- Roger Godsiff, Birmingham Hall Green
- Helen Goodman, Bishop Auckland
- Kate Green, Stretford and Urmston
- Lilian Greenwood, Nottingham South
- Margaret Greenwood, Wirral West
- Nia Griffith, Llanelli
- John Grogan, Keighley
- Andrew Gwynne, Denton and Reddish
- Louise Haigh, Sheffield Heeley
- Fabian Hamilton, Leeds North East
- David Hanson, Delyn
- Emma Hardy, Kingston upon Hull West and Hessle
- Harriet Harman, Camberwell and Peckham
- Carolyn Harris, Swansea East
- Helen Hayes, Dulwich and West Norwood
- Sue Hayman, Workington
- John Healey, Wentworth and Dearne
- Mark Hendrick, Preston
- Stephen Hepburn, Jarrow
- Mike Hill, Hartlepool
- Meg Hillier, Hackney South and Shoreditch
- Margaret Hodge, Barking
- Sharon Hodgson, Washington and Sunderland West
- Kate Hoey, Vauxhall
- Kate Hollern, Blackburn
- George Howarth, Knowsley
- Rupa Huq, Ealing Central and Acton
- Imran Hussain, Bradford East
- Dan Jarvis, Barnsley Central
- Diana Johnson, Kingston upon Hull North
- Darren Jones, Bristol North West
- Gerald Jones, Merthyr Tydfil and Rhymney
- Graham Jones, Hyndburn
- Helen Jones, Warrington North
- Kevan Jones, North Durham
- Sarah Jones, Croydon Central
- Susan Elan Jones, Clwyd South
- Mike Kane, Wythenshawe and Sale East
- Barbara Keeley, Worsley and Eccles South
- Liz Kendall, Leicester West
- Afzal Khan, Manchester Gorton
- Gerard Killen, Rutherglen and Hamilton West
- Stephen Kinnock, Aberavon
- Peter Kyle, Hove
- Lesley Laird, Kirkcaldy and Cowdenbeath
- David Lammy, Tottenham
- Ian Lavery, Wansbeck
- Karen Lee, Lincoln
- Chris Leslie, Nottingham East
- Emma Lewell-Buck, South Shields
- Clive Lewis, Norwich South
- Tony Lloyd, Rochdale
- Rebecca Long-Bailey, Salford and Eccles
- Ian Lucas, Wrexham
- Holly Lynch, Halifax
- Justin Madders, Ellesmere Port and Neston
- Khalid Mahmood, Birmingham Perry Barr
- Shabana Mahmood, Birmingham Ladywood
- Seema Malhotra, Feltham and Heston
- Gordon Marsden, Blackpool South
- Sandy Martin, Ipswich
- Rachael Maskell, York Central
- Chris Matheson, City of Chester
- Steve McCabe, Birmingham Selly Oak
- Kerry McCarthy, Bristol East
- Siobhain McDonagh, Mitcham and Morden
- Andy McDonald, Middlesbrough
- John McDonnell, Hayes and Harlington
- Pat McFadden, Wolverhampton South East
- Conor McGinn, St Helens North
- Alison McGovern, Wirral South
- Liz McInnes, Heywood and Middleton
- Catherine McKinnell, Newcastle upon Tyne North
- Jim McMahon, Oldham West and Royton
- Anna McMorrin, Cardiff North
- Ian Mearns, Gateshead
- Ed Miliband, Doncaster North
- Madeleine Moon, Bridgend
- Jessica Morden, Newport East
- Stephen Morgan, Portsmouth South
- Grahame Morris, Easington
- Ian Murray, Edinburgh South
- Lisa Nandy, Wigan
- Alex Norris, Nottingham North
- Melanie Onn, Great Grimsby
- Chi Onwurah, Newcastle upon Tyne Central
- Kate Osamor, Edmonton
- Albert Owen, Ynys Môn
- Stephanie Peacock, Barnsley East
- Teresa Pearce, Erith and Thamesmead
- Matthew Pennycook, Greenwich and Woolwich
- Toby Perkins, Chesterfield
- Jess Phillips, Birmingham Yardley
- Bridget Phillipson, Houghton and Sunderland South
- Laura Pidcock, North West Durham
- Jo Platt, Leigh
- Luke Pollard, Plymouth Sutton and Devonport
- Stephen Pound, Ealing North
- Lucy Powell, Manchester Central
- Yasmin Qureshi, Bolton South East
- Faisal Rashid, Warrington South
- Angela Rayner, Ashton-under-Lyne
- Steve Reed, Croydon North
- Christina Rees, Neath
- Ellie Reeves, Lewisham West and Penge
- Rachel Reeves, Leeds West
- Emma Reynolds, Wolverhampton North East
- Jonathan Reynolds, Stalybridge and Hyde
- Marie Rimmer, St Helens South and Whiston
- Geoffrey Robinson, Coventry North West
- Matt Rodda, Reading East
- Danielle Rowley, Midlothian
- Chris Ruane, Vale of Clwyd
- Lloyd Russell-Moyle, Brighton Kemptown
- Joan Ryan, Enfield North
- Naz Shah, Bradford West
- Virendra Sharma, Ealing Southall
- Barry Sheerman, Huddersfield
- Paula Sherriff, Dewsbury
- Gavin Shuker, Luton South
- Tulip Siddiq, Hampstead and Kilburn
- Dennis Skinner, Bolsover
- Andy Slaughter, Hammersmith
- Ruth Smeeth, Stoke-on-Trent North
- Angela Smith, Penistone and Stocksbridge
- Cat Smith, Lancaster and Fleetwood
- Eleanor Smith, Wolverhampton South West
- Jeff Smith, Manchester Withington
- Laura Smith, Crewe and Nantwich
- Owen Smith, Pontypridd
- Karin Smyth, Bristol South
- Gareth Snell, Stoke-on-Trent Central
- Alex Sobel, Leeds North West
- John Spellar, Birmingham Northfield
- Keir Starmer, Holborn and St Pancras
- Jo Stevens, Cardiff Central
- Wes Streeting, Ilford North
- Graham Stringer, Blackley and Broughton
- Paul Sweeney, Glasgow North East
- Mark Tami, Alyn and Deeside
- Gareth Thomas, Harrow West
- Nick Thomas-Symonds, Torfaen
- Emily Thornberry, Islington South and Finsbury
- Stephen Timms, East Ham
- Jon Trickett, Hemsworth
- Anna Turley, Redcar
- Karl Turner, Kingston upon Hull East
- Derek Twigg, Halton
- Stephen Twigg, Liverpool West Derby
- Liz Twist, Blaydon
- Chuka Umunna, Streatham
- Keith Vaz, Leicester East
- Valerie Vaz, Walsall South
- Thelma Walker, Colne Valley
- Tom Watson, West Bromwich East
- Catherine West, Hornsey and Wood Green
- Matthew Western, Warwick and Leamington
- Alan Whitehead, Southampton Test
- Martin Whitfield East Lothian
- Paul Williams, Stockton South
- Chris Williamson, Derby North
- Phil Wilson, Sedgefield
- Mohammad Yasin, Bedford
- Daniel Zeichner, Cambridge
- Liberal Democrat (11)
- Tom Brake, Carshalton and Wallington
- Vince Cable, Twickenham
- Alistair Carmichael, Orkney and Shetland
- Ed Davey, Kingston and Surbiton
- Tim Farron, Westmorland and Lonsdale
- Wera Hobhouse, Bath
- Christine Jardine, Edinburgh West
- Norman Lamb, North Norfolk
- Layla Moran, Oxford West and Abingdon
- Jamie Stone, Caithness, Sutherland and Easter Ross
- Jo Swinson, East Dunbartonshire
- Plaid Cymru (4)
- Jonathan Edwards, Carmarthen East and Dinefwr
- Ben Lake, Ceredigion
- Liz Saville Roberts, Dwyfor Meirionnydd
- Hywel Williams, Arfon
- Scottish National Party (35)
- Hannah Bardell, Livingston
- Mhairi Black, Paisley and Renfrewshire South
- Ian Blackford, Ross, Skye and Lochaber
- Kirsty Blackman, Aberdeen North
- Deidre Brock, Edinburgh North and Leith
- Alan Brown, Kilmarnock and Loudoun
- Lisa Cameron, East Kilbride, Strathaven and Lesmahagow
- Douglas Chapman, Dunfermline and West Fife
- Joanna Cherry, Edinburgh South West
- Ronnie Cowan, Inverclyde
- Angela Crawley, Lanark and Hamilton East
- Martyn Day, Linlithgow and East Falkirk
- Martin Docherty-Hughes, West Dunbartonshire
- Marion Fellows, Motherwell and Wishaw
- Stephen Gethins, North East Fife
- Patricia Gibson, North Ayrshire and Arran
- Patrick Grady, Glasgow North
- Peter Grant, Glenrothes
- Neil Gray, Airdrie and Shotts
- Drew Hendry, Inverness, Nairn, Badenoch and Strathspey
- Stewart Hosie, Dundee East
- Chris Law, Dundee West
- David Linden, Glasgow East
- Angus MacNeil, Na h-Eileanan an Iar
- John McNally, Falkirk
- Stewart McDonald, Glasgow South
- Stuart McDonald, Cumbernauld, Kilsyth and Kirkintilloch East
- Carol Monaghan, Glasgow North West
- Gavin Newlands, Paisley and Renfrewshire North
- Brendan O'Hara, Argyll and Bute
- Tommy Sheppard, Edinburgh East
- Chris Stephens, Glasgow South West
- Alison Thewliss, Glasgow Central
- Philippa Whitford, Central Ayrshire
- Pete Wishart, Perth and North Perthshire

Abstentions (1)

- Labour (1)
- Paul Flynn, Newport West (due to ill health)

Meaningful vote
Ballot →	15 January 2019 (Note: Figure of 635 is based on 650 MPs minus seven Sinn Féin MPs who follow a policy of abstentionism and eight others: the Speaker John Bercow, the Deputy Speakers (Lindsay Hoyle, Eleanor Laing and Rosie Winterton), who do not vote; and the tellers (in this case, for the Ayes, Wendy Morton and Iain Stewart, and for the Noes, Vicky Foxcroft and Nick Smith), whose votes are not taken into account.)
Yes	202 / 635
No	432 / 635
Abstentions	1 / 635
Sources: Hansard

In the immediate aftermath, Leader of the Opposition Jeremy Corbyn called for a vote of no confidence in the government, which was held on 16 January 2019. The government won the vote by 325 to 306, a majority of 19.

=== Vote on "motion in neutral terms" (29 January 2019) ===
Section 13 of the 2018 Act required that the government put down a motion, in neutral terms, in response to the written statements made by the prime minister on 21 and 24 January, in which she set out her "Plan B". In accordance with Dominic Grieve's "three day amendment" to the parliamentary timetable, this motion was tabled on 21 January (three sitting days after the draft Withdrawal Agreement was rejected by MPs), and it was put to a vote on 29 January 2019. It took the form of a resolution to the effect that the House of Commons had "considered" the Prime Minister's statements. This neutral motion was subject to amendment, and prior to voting on the main motion, the Commons voted on seven amendments, proposed by MPs and selected by the Speaker.

Two amendments were passed. The Brady amendment called on the Government to re-negotiate over the Northern Ireland backstop. It passed by 16 votes, supported by the Conservatives and DUP over other parties in the Commons, but with 7 Labour MPs supporting it and 8 Conservative MPs voting against it. The Spelman-Dromey amendment declared the desire of the Commons to avoid a no-deal Brexit. It passed by 8 votes, supported by all the parties other than the Conservatives and DUP, but with the support of 17 Conservative MPs. An amendment seeking to pave the way for a binding legislation that would prevent no deal, the Cooper-Boles amendment, failed by 23 votes. Three other amendments also failed. The main motion (as amended) was then passed without a division.

Final full text of resolution of the House of Commons on 29 January 2019

Resolved, That this House, in accordance with the provisions of section 13(6)(a) and 13(11)(b)(i) and 13(13)(b) of the European Union (Withdrawal) Act 2018, has considered the Written Statement titled "Statement under Section 13(4) of the European Union (Withdrawal) Act 2018" and made on 21 January 2019, and the Written Statement titled "Statement under Section 13(11)(a) of the European Union (Withdrawal) Act 2018" and made on 24 January 2019, and rejects the United Kingdom leaving the European Union without a Withdrawal Agreement and a Framework for the Future Relationship, and requires the Northern Ireland backstop to be replaced with alternative arrangements to avoid a hard border; supports leaving the European Union with a deal and would therefore support the Withdrawal Agreement subject to this change.

May stated that a further "meaningful vote" would be held "as soon as we possibly can", but that if it did not take place by 13 February then she would present a statement, to be followed by a debate on an amendable motion on 14 February.

=== Vote on amendable motion (14 February 2019) ===
On 12 February 2019, Theresa May made a statement to the House of Commons on the government's progress in securing a withdrawal agreement. This was followed, on 14 February, by a vote on an amendable motion in the following terms: "That this House welcomes the Prime Minister’s statement of 12 February 2019; reiterates its support for the approach to leaving the EU expressed by this House on 29 January 2019 and notes that discussions between the UK and the EU on the Northern Ireland backstop are ongoing."'

All proposed amendments to the motion were defeated. The motion itself was then defeated, by a margin of 303–259, due in part to abstentions by the European Research Group faction of Conservative MPs, who objected that the motion appeared to rule out leaving the EU without a withdrawal agreement.

In her statement on 12 February, the prime minister reiterated her goal of having a second "meaningful vote" on a withdrawal agreement. She indicated that if this was not achieved by 26 February the government would make another statement to the House on the government's progress, and table an amendable motion relating to that statement, which would be put to a vote on 27 February.

=== Vote on amendable motion (27 February 2019) ===
On 27 February 2019, the House of Commons voted on an amendable motion in the following terms: "That this House notes the Prime Minister’s statement on Leaving the European Union of 26 February 2019; and further notes that discussions between the UK and the EU are ongoing."

Two amendments were passed. An amendment to seek a joint UK-EU commitment to citizens' rights was passed without a division. An amendment to specify the timeframe for further meaningful votes in March 2019 was passed by a margin of 502–20. The main motion (as amended) was then passed without a division.

Final full text of resolution of the House of Commons on 27 February 2019

Resolved, That this House notes the Prime Minister’s statement on Leaving the European Union of 26 February 2019; and further notes that discussions between the UK and the EU are ongoing; and requires the Prime Minister to seek at the earliest opportunity a joint UK-EU commitment to adopt part two of the Withdrawal Agreement on Citizens’ Rights and ensure its implementation prior to the UK’s exiting the European Union, whatever the outcome of negotiations on other aspects of the Withdrawal Agreement; and further notes in particular the commitment of the Prime Minister made in this House to hold a second meaningful vote by 12 March and if the House, having rejected leaving with the deal negotiated with the EU, then rejects leaving on 29 March without a withdrawal agreement and future framework, the Government will, on 14 March, bring forward a motion on whether Parliament wants to seek a short limited extension to Article 50, and if the House votes for an extension, seek to agree that extension approved by the House with the EU, and bring forward the necessary legislation to change the exit date commensurate with that extension.

=== Second "meaningful vote" (12 March 2019) ===
The second meaningful vote took place on 12 March 2019. The deal was supported by 235 Conservative MPs, four independent MPs, and Labour MPs Kevin Barron, Caroline Flint and John Mann, and was opposed by the remaining MPs, including all 10 DUP MPs and 75 Conservative MPs. One Conservative MP, Douglas Ross, was unable to vote or exercise his right to a proxy vote due to the birth of his child on the day of the vote.

Full results

Ayes (242)

- Conservative (235)
- Nigel Adams, Selby and Ainsty
- Bim Afolami, Hitchin and Harpenden
- Peter Aldous, Waveney
- David Amess, Southend West
- Stuart Andrew, Pudsey
- Edward Argar, Charnwood
- Victoria Atkins, Louth and Horncastle
- Kemi Badenoch, Saffron Walden
- Harriett Baldwin, West Worcestershire
- Steve Barclay, North East Cambridgeshire
- Henry Bellingham, North West Norfolk
- Richard Benyon, Newbury
- Paul Beresford, Mole Valley
- Jake Berry, Rossendale and Darwen
- Bob Blackman, Harrow East
- Nick Boles, Grantham and Stamford
- Peter Bottomley, Worthing West
- Andrew Bowie, West Aberdeenshire and Kincardine
- Ben Bradley, Mansfield
- Karen Bradley, Staffordshire Moorlands
- Graham Brady, Altrincham and Sale West
- Jack Brereton, Stoke-on-Trent South
- Steve Brine, Winchester
- James Brokenshire, Old Bexley and Sidcup
- Fiona Bruce, Congleton
- Robert Buckland, South Swindon
- Alex Burghart, Brentwood and Ongar
- Alistair Burt, North East Bedfordshire
- Alun Cairns, Vale of Glamorgan
- James Cartlidge, South Suffolk
- Maria Caulfield, Lewes
- Alex Chalk, Cheltenham
- Jo Churchill, Bury St Edmunds
- Colin Clark, Gordon
- Greg Clark, Tunbridge Wells
- Ken Clarke, Rushcliffe
- James Cleverly, Braintree
- Geoffrey Clifton-Brown, The Cotswolds
- Thérèse Coffey, Suffolk Coastal
- Alberto Costa, South Leicestershire
- Geoffrey Cox, Torridge and West Devon
- Stephen Crabb, Preseli Pembrokeshire
- Tracey Crouch, Chatham and Aylesford
- Chris Davies, Brecon and Radnorshire
- David T.C. Davies, Monmouth
- Glyn Davies, Montgomeryshire
- Mims Davies, Eastleigh
- Philip Davies, Shipley
- David Davis, Haltemprice and Howden
- Caroline Dinenage, Gosport
- Jonathan Djanogly, Huntingdon
- Leo Docherty, Aldershot
- Michelle Donelan, Chippenham
- Nadine Dorries, Mid Bedfordshire
- Steve Double, St Austell and Newquay
- Oliver Dowden, Hertsmere
- Jackie Doyle-Price, Thurrock
- David Duguid, Banff and Buchan
- Alan Duncan, Rutland and Melton
- Philip Dunne, Ludlow
- Michael Ellis, Northampton North
- Tobias Ellwood, Bournemouth East
- George Eustice, Camborne and Redruth
- Nigel Evans, Ribble Valley
- David Evennett, Bexleyheath and Crayford
- Mark Field, Cities of London and Westminster
- Vicky Ford, Chelmsford
- Kevin Foster, Torbay
- Liam Fox, North Somerset
- Lucy Frazer, South East Cambridgeshire
- George Freeman, Mid Norfolk
- Mike Freer, Finchley and Golders Green
- Roger Gale, North Thanet
- Mark Garnier, Wyre Forest
- David Gauke, South West Hertfordshire
- Nus Ghani, Wealden
- Nick Gibb, Bognor Regis and Littlehampton
- Cheryl Gillan, Chesham and Amersham
- John Glen, Salisbury
- Zac Goldsmith, Richmond Park (Surrey)
- Robert Goodwill, Scarborough and Whitby
- Michael Gove, Surrey Heath
- Luke Graham, Ochil and South Perthshire
- Richard Graham, Gloucester
- Bill Grant, Ayr, Carrick and Cumnock
- Helen Grant, Maidstone and The Weald
- Chris Grayling, Epsom and Ewell
- Damian Green, Ashford
- Andrew Griffiths, Burton
- Kirstene Hair, Angus
- Robert Halfon, Harlow
- Luke Hall, Thornbury and Yate
- Philip Hammond, Runnymede and Weybridge
- Stephen Hammond, Wimbledon
- Matt Hancock, West Suffolk
- Greg Hands, Chelsea and Fulham
- Richard Harrington, Watford
- Rebecca Harris, Castle Point
- Trudy Harrison, Copeland
- Simon Hart, Carmarthen West and South Pembrokeshire
- John Hayes, South Holland and The Deepings
- Oliver Heald, North East Hertfordshire
- James Heappey, Wells
- Chris Heaton-Harris, Daventry
- Peter Heaton-Jones, North Devon
- Nick Herbert, Arundel and South Downs
- Damian Hinds, East Hampshire
- Simon Hoare, North Dorset
- George Hollingbery, Meon Valley
- Kevin Hollinrake, Thirsk and Malton
- John Howell, Henley
- Nigel Huddleston, Mid Worcestershire
- Jeremy Hunt, South West Surrey
- Nick Hurd, Ruislip, Northwood and Pinner
- Alister Jack, Dumfries and Galloway
- Margot James, Stourbridge
- Sajid Javid, Bromsgrove
- Robert Jenrick, Newark
- Caroline Johnson, Sleaford and North Hykeham
- Andrew Jones, Harrogate and Knaresborough
- Marcus Jones, Nuneaton
- Gillian Keegan, Chichester
- Seema Kennedy, South Ribble
- Stephen Kerr, Stirling
- Greg Knight, East Yorkshire
- Julian Knight, Solihull
- Kwasi Kwarteng, Spelthorne
- John Lamont, Berwickshire, Roxburgh and Selkirk
- Mark Lancaster, Milton Keynes North
- Andrea Leadsom, South Northamptonshire
- Jeremy Lefroy, Stafford
- Edward Leigh, Gainsborough
- Oliver Letwin, West Dorset
- Brandon Lewis, Great Yarmouth
- David Lidington, Aylesbury
- Jack Lopresti, Filton and Bradley Stoke
- Tim Loughton, East Worthing and Shoreham
- Rachel Maclean, Redditch
- Alan Mak, Havant
- Kit Malthouse, North West Hampshire
- Scott Mann, North Cornwall
- Paul Masterton, East Renfrewshire
- Theresa May, Maidenhead
- Paul Maynard, Blackpool North and Cleveleys
- Patrick McLoughlin, Derbyshire Dales
- Stephen McPartland, Stevenage
- Mark Menzies, Fylde
- Johnny Mercer, Plymouth, Moor View
- Huw Merriman, Bexhill and Battle
- Stephen Metcalfe, South Basildon and East Thurrock
- Maria Miller, Basingstoke
- Amanda Milling, Cannock Chase
- Nigel Mills, Amber Valley
- Anne Milton, Guildford
- Andrew Mitchell, Sutton Coldfield
- Damien Moore, Southport
- Penny Mordaunt, Portsmouth North
- Nicky Morgan, Loughborough
- David Morris, Morecambe and Lunesdale
- James Morris, Halesowen and Rowley Regis
- Wendy Morton, Aldridge-Brownhills
- David Mundell, Dumfriesshire, Clydesdale and Tweeddale
- Andrew Murrison, South West Wiltshire
- Bob Neill, Bromley and Chislehurst
- Sarah Newton, Truro and Falmouth
- Caroline Nokes, Romsey and Southampton North
- Jesse Norman, Hereford and South Herefordshire
- Neil O'Brien, Harborough
- Matthew Offord, Hendon
- Guy Opperman, Hexham
- Neil Parish, Tiverton and Honiton
- Mark Pawsey, Rugby
- Mike Penning, Hemel Hempstead
- John Penrose, Weston-super-Mare
- Andrew Percy, Brigg and Goole
- Claire Perry, Devizes
- Chris Philp, Croydon South
- Christopher Pincher, Tamworth
- Dan Poulter, Central Suffolk and North Ipswich
- Rebecca Pow, Taunton Deane
- Victoria Prentis, Banbury
- Mark Prisk, Hertford and Stortford
- Mark Pritchard, The Wrekin
- Jeremy Quin, Horsham
- Will Quince, Colchester
- Mary Robinson, Cheadle
- Amber Rudd, Hastings and Rye
- David Rutley, Macclesfield
- Antoinette Sandbach, Eddisbury
- Paul Scully, Sutton and Cheam
- Bob Seely, Isle of Wight
- Andrew Selous, South West Bedfordshire
- Alok Sharma, Reading West
- Alec Shelbrooke, Elmet and Rothwell
- Keith Simpson, Broadland
- Chris Skidmore, Kingswood
- Chloe Smith, Norwich North
- Julian Smith, Skipton and Ripon
- Nicholas Soames, Mid Sussex
- Caroline Spelman, Meriden
- Mark Spencer, Sherwood
- John Stevenson, Carlisle
- Rory Stewart, Penrith and The Border
- Gary Streeter, South West Devon
- Mel Stride, Central Devon
- Graham Stuart, Beverley and Holderness
- Julian Sturdy, York Outer
- Rishi Sunak, Richmond (Yorks)
- Desmond Swayne, New Forest West
- Hugo Swire, East Devon
- Robert Syms, Poole
- Derek Thomas, St Ives
- Maggie Throup, Erewash
- Kelly Tolhurst, Rochester and Strood
- Justin Tomlinson, North Swindon
- David Tredinnick, Bosworth
- Liz Truss, South West Norfolk
- Tom Tugendhat, Tonbridge and Malling
- Ed Vaizey, Wantage
- Martin Vickers, Cleethorpes
- Charles Walker, Broxbourne
- Robin Walker, Worcester
- Ben Wallace, Wyre and Preston North
- David Warburton, Somerton and Frome
- Matt Warman, Boston and Skegness
- Giles Watling, Clacton
- Helen Whately, Faversham and Mid Kent
- Heather Wheeler, South Derbyshire
- Craig Whittaker, Calder Valley
- Bill Wiggin, North Herefordshire
- Gavin Williamson, South Staffordshire
- Mike Wood, Dudley South
- William Wragg, Hazel Grove
- Jeremy Wright, Kenilworth and Southam
- Nadhim Zahawi, Stratford-on-Avon
- Independent (4)
- Ian Austin, Dudley North
- Frank Field, Birkenhead
- Sylvia Hermon, North Down
- Stephen Lloyd, Eastbourne
- Labour (3)
- Kevin Barron, Rother Valley
- Caroline Flint, Don Valley
- John Mann, Bassetlaw

Noes (391)

- Conservative (75)
- Adam Afriyie, Windsor
- Lucy Allan, Telford
- Richard Bacon, South Norfolk
- Steve Baker, Wycombe
- John Baron, Basildon and Billericay
- Guto Bebb, Aberconwy
- Crispin Blunt, Reigate
- Peter Bone, Wellingborough
- Suella Braverman, Fareham
- Andrew Bridgen, North West Leicestershire
- Conor Burns, Bournemouth West
- Bill Cash, Stone
- Rehman Chishti, Gillingham and Rainham
- Christopher Chope, Christchurch
- Simon Clarke, Middlesbrough South and East Cleveland
- Damian Collins, Folkestone and Hythe
- Robert Courts, Witney
- Richard Drax, South Dorset
- James Duddridge, Rochford and Southend East
- Iain Duncan Smith, Chingford and Woodford Green
- Charlie Elphicke, Dover
- Michael Fabricant, Lichfield
- Michael Fallon, Sevenoaks
- Mark Francois, Rayleigh and Wickford
- Marcus Fysh, Yeovil
- James Gray, North Wiltshire
- Chris Green, Bolton West
- Justine Greening, Putney
- Dominic Grieve, Beaconsfield
- Sam Gyimah, East Surrey
- Mark Harper, Forest of Dean
- Gordon Henderson, Sittingbourne and Sheppey
- Philip Hollobone, Kettering
- Adam Holloway, Gravesham
- Eddie Hughes, Walsall North
- Ranil Jayawardena, North East Hampshire
- Bernard Jenkin, Harwich and North Essex
- Andrea Jenkyns, Morley and Outwood
- Boris Johnson, Uxbridge and South Ruislip
- Gareth Johnson, Dartford
- Jo Johnson, Orpington
- David Jones, Clwyd West
- Daniel Kawczynski, Shrewsbury and Atcham
- Pauline Latham, Mid Derbyshire
- Phillip Lee, Bracknell
- Andrew Lewer, Northampton South
- Julian Lewis, New Forest East
- Ian Liddell-Grainger, Bridgwater and West Somerset
- Julia Lopez, Hornchurch and Upminster
- Jonathan Lord, Woking
- Craig Mackinlay, South Thanet
- Anne Main, St Albans
- Esther McVey, Tatton
- Anne Marie Morris, Newton Abbot
- Sheryll Murray, South East Cornwall
- Priti Patel, Witham
- Owen Paterson, North Shropshire
- Tom Pursglove, Corby
- Dominic Raab, Esher and Walton
- John Redwood, Wokingham
- Jacob Rees-Mogg, North East Somerset
- Laurence Robertson, Tewkesbury
- Andrew Rosindell, Romford
- Lee Rowley, North East Derbyshire
- Grant Shapps, Welwyn Hatfield
- Henry Smith, Crawley
- Royston Smith, Southampton Itchen
- Bob Stewart, Beckenham
- Ross Thomson, Aberdeen South
- Michael Tomlinson, Mid Dorset and North Poole
- Craig Tracey, North Warwickshire
- Anne-Marie Trevelyan, Berwick-upon-Tweed
- Shailesh Vara, North West Cambridgeshire
- Theresa Villiers, Chipping Barnet
- John Whittingdale , Maldon
- Democratic Unionist Party (10)
- Gregory Campbell, East Londonderry
- Nigel Dodds, Belfast North
- Jeffrey Donaldson, Lagan Valley
- Paul Girvan, South Antrim
- Emma Little-Pengelly, Belfast South
- Ian Paisley, North Antrim
- Gavin Robinson, Belfast East
- Jim Shannon, Strangford
- David Simpson, Upper Bann
- Sammy Wilson, East Antrim
- Green (1)
- Caroline Lucas, Brighton Pavilion
- Independent (6)
- Kelvin Hopkins, Luton North
- Ivan Lewis, Bury South
- Jared O'Mara, Sheffield Hallam
- Fiona Onasanya, Peterborough
- Chris Williamson, Derby North
- John Woodcock, Barrow and Furness
- The Independent Group (11)
- Heidi Allen, South Cambridgeshire
- Luciana Berger, Liverpool Riverside
- Ann Coffey, Stockport
- Mike Gapes, Ilford South
- Chris Leslie, Nottingham East
- Joan Ryan, Enfield North
- Gavin Shuker, Luton South
- Angela Smith, Penistone and Stocksbridge
- Anna Soubry, Broxtowe
- Chuka Umunna, Streatham
- Sarah Wollaston, Totnes
- Labour (238)
- Diane Abbott, Hackney North and Stoke Newington
- Debbie Abrahams, Oldham East and Saddleworth
- Rushanara Ali, Bethnal Green and Bow
- Rosena Allin-Khan, Tooting
- Mike Amesbury, Weaver Vale
- Tonia Antoniazzi, Gower
- Jon Ashworth, Leicester South
- Adrian Bailey, West Bromwich West
- Margaret Beckett, Derby South
- Hilary Benn, Leeds Central
- Clive Betts, Sheffield South East
- Roberta Blackman-Woods, City of Durham
- Paul Blomfield, Sheffield Central
- Tracy Brabin, Batley and Spen
- Ben Bradshaw, Exeter
- Kevin Brennan, Cardiff West
- Lyn Brown, West Ham
- Nick Brown, Newcastle-upon-Tyne East and Wallsend
- Chris Bryant, Rhondda
- Karen Buck, Westminster North
- Richard Burden, Birmingham Northfield
- Richard Burgon, Leeds East
- Dawn Butler, Brent Central
- Liam Byrne, Birmingham Hodge Hill
- Ruth Cadbury, Brentford and Isleworth
- Alan Campbell, Tynemouth
- Ronnie Campbell, Blyth Valley
- Dan Carden, Liverpool Walton
- Sarah Champion, Rotherham
- Jenny Chapman, Darlington
- Bambos Charalambous, Enfield Southgate
- Ann Clwyd, Cynon Valley
- Vernon Coaker, Gedling
- Julie Cooper, Burnley
- Rosie Cooper, West Lancashire
- Yvette Cooper, Normanton, Pontefract and Castleford
- Jeremy Corbyn, Islington North
- Neil Coyle, Bermondsey and Old Southwark
- David Crausby, Bolton North East
- Mary Creagh, Wakefield
- Stella Creasy, Walthamstow
- Jon Cruddas, Dagenham and Rainham
- John Cryer, Leyton and Wanstead
- Judith Cummins, Bradford South
- Alex Cunningham, Stockton North
- Jim Cunningham, Coventry South
- Janet Daby, Lewisham East
- Wayne David, Caerphilly
- Geraint Davies Swansea West
- Marsha de Cordova, Battersea
- Gloria De Piero, Ashfield
- Emma Dent Coad, Kensington
- Tanmanjeet Singh Dhesi, Slough
- Anneliese Dodds, Oxford East
- Stephen Doughty, Cardiff South and Penarth
- Peter Dowd, Bootle
- David Drew, Stroud
- Jack Dromey, Birmingham Erdington
- Rosie Duffield, Canterbury
- Angela Eagle, Wallasey
- Maria Eagle, Garston and Halewood
- Clive Efford, Eltham
- Julie Elliott, Sunderland Central
- Louise Ellman, Liverpool Riverside
- Chris Elmore, Ogmore
- Bill Esterson, Sefton Central
- Chris Evans, Islwyn
- Paul Farrelly, Newcastle-under-Lyme
- Jim Fitzpatrick Poplar and Limehouse
- Colleen Fletcher, Coventry North East
- Yvonne Fovargue, Makerfield
- Vicky Foxcroft, Lewisham Deptford
- James Frith, Bury North
- Gill Furniss, Sheffield Brightside and Hillsborough
- Hugh Gaffney, Coatbridge, Chryston and Bellshill
- Barry Gardiner, Brent North
- Ruth George, High Peak
- Preet Gill, Birmingham Edgbaston
- Mary Glindon, North Tyneside
- Roger Godsiff, Birmingham Hall Green
- Helen Goodman, Bishop Auckland
- Kate Green, Stretford and Urmston
- Lilian Greenwood, Nottingham South
- Margaret Greenwood, Wirral West
- Nia Griffith, Llanelli
- John Grogan, Keighley
- Andrew Gwynne, Denton and Reddish
- Louise Haigh, Sheffield Heeley
- Fabian Hamilton, Leeds North East
- David Hanson, Delyn
- Emma Hardy, Kingston upon Hull West and Hessle
- Harriet Harman, Camberwell and Peckham
- Carolyn Harris, Swansea East
- Helen Hayes, Dulwich and West Norwood
- Sue Hayman, Workington
- John Healey, Wentworth and Dearne
- Mark Hendrick, Preston
- Stephen Hepburn, Jarrow
- Mike Hill, Hartlepool
- Meg Hillier, Hackney South and Shoreditch
- Margaret Hodge, Barking
- Sharon Hodgson, Washington and Sunderland West
- Kate Hoey, Vauxhall
- Kate Hollern, Blackburn
- George Howarth, Knowsley
- Rupa Huq, Ealing Central and Acton
- Imran Hussain, Bradford East
- Dan Jarvis, Barnsley Central
- Diana Johnson, Kingston upon Hull North
- Darren Jones, Bristol North West
- Gerald Jones, Merthyr Tydfil and Rhymney
- Graham Jones, Hyndburn
- Helen Jones, Warrington North
- Kevan Jones, North Durham
- Sarah Jones, Croydon Central
- Susan Elan Jones, Clwyd South
- Mike Kane, Wythenshawe and Sale East
- Barbara Keeley, Worsley and Eccles South
- Liz Kendall, Leicester West
- Afzal Khan, Manchester Gorton
- Gerard Killen, Rutherglen and Hamilton West
- Stephen Kinnock, Aberavon
- Peter Kyle, Hove
- Lesley Laird, Kirkcaldy and Cowdenbeath
- David Lammy, Tottenham
- Ian Lavery, Wansbeck
- Karen Lee, Lincoln
- Emma Lewell-Buck, South Shields
- Clive Lewis, Norwich South
- Tony Lloyd, Rochdale
- Rebecca Long-Bailey, Salford and Eccles
- Ian Lucas, Wrexham
- Holly Lynch, Halifax
- Justin Madders, Ellesmere Port and Neston
- Khalid Mahmood, Birmingham Perry Barr
- Shabana Mahmood, Birmingham Ladywood
- Seema Malhotra, Feltham and Heston
- Gordon Marsden, Blackpool South
- Sandy Martin, Ipswich
- Rachael Maskell, York Central
- Chris Matheson, City of Chester
- Steve McCabe, Birmingham Selly Oak
- Kerry McCarthy, Bristol East
- Siobhain McDonagh, Mitcham and Morden
- Andy McDonald, Middlesbrough
- John McDonnell, Hayes and Harlington
- Pat McFadden, Wolverhampton South East
- Conor McGinn, St Helens North
- Alison McGovern, Wirral South
- Liz McInnes, Heywood and Middleton
- Catherine McKinnell, Newcastle upon Tyne North
- Jim McMahon, Oldham West and Royton
- Anna McMorrin, Cardiff North
- Ian Mearns, Gateshead
- Ed Miliband, Doncaster North
- Madeleine Moon, Bridgend
- Jessica Morden, Newport East
- Stephen Morgan, Portsmouth South
- Grahame Morris, Easington
- Ian Murray, Edinburgh South
- Lisa Nandy, Wigan
- Alex Norris, Nottingham North
- Melanie Onn, Great Grimsby
- Chi Onwurah, Newcastle upon Tyne Central
- Kate Osamor, Edmonton
- Albert Owen, Ynys Môn
- Stephanie Peacock, Barnsley East
- Teresa Pearce, Erith and Thamesmead
- Matthew Pennycook, Greenwich and Woolwich
- Toby Perkins, Chesterfield
- Jess Phillips, Birmingham Yardley
- Bridget Phillipson, Houghton and Sunderland South
- Laura Pidcock, North West Durham
- Jo Platt, Leigh
- Luke Pollard, Plymouth Sutton and Devonport
- Stephen Pound, Ealing North
- Lucy Powell, Manchester Central
- Yasmin Qureshi, Bolton South East
- Faisal Rashid, Warrington South
- Angela Rayner, Ashton-under-Lyne
- Steve Reed, Croydon North
- Christina Rees, Neath
- Ellie Reeves, Lewisham West and Penge
- Rachel Reeves, Leeds West
- Emma Reynolds, Wolverhampton North East
- Jonathan Reynolds, Stalybridge and Hyde
- Marie Rimmer, St Helens South and Whiston
- Geoffrey Robinson, Coventry North West
- Matt Rodda, Reading East
- Danielle Rowley, Midlothian
- Chris Ruane, Vale of Clwyd
- Lloyd Russell-Moyle, Brighton Kemptown
- Naz Shah, Bradford West
- Virendra Sharma, Ealing Southall
- Barry Sheerman, Huddersfield
- Paula Sherriff, Dewsbury
- Tulip Siddiq, Hampstead and Kilburn
- Dennis Skinner, Bolsover
- Andy Slaughter, Hammersmith
- Ruth Smeeth, Stoke-on-Trent North
- Cat Smith, Lancaster and Fleetwood
- Eleanor Smith, Wolverhampton South West
- Jeff Smith, Manchester Withington
- Laura Smith, Crewe and Nantwich
- Nick Smith, Blaenau Gwent
- Owen Smith, Pontypridd
- Karin Smyth, Bristol South
- Gareth Snell, Stoke-on-Trent Central
- Alex Sobel, Leeds North West
- John Spellar, Birmingham Northfield
- Keir Starmer, Holborn and St Pancras
- Jo Stevens, Cardiff Central
- Wes Streeting, Ilford North
- Graham Stringer, Blackley and Broughton
- Paul Sweeney, Glasgow North East
- Mark Tami, Alyn and Deeside
- Gareth Thomas, Harrow West
- Nick Thomas-Symonds, Torfaen
- Emily Thornberry, Islington South and Finsbury
- Stephen Timms, East Ham
- Jon Trickett, Hemsworth
- Anna Turley, Redcar
- Karl Turner, Kingston upon Hull East
- Derek Twigg, Halton
- Stephen Twigg, Liverpool West Derby
- Liz Twist, Blaydon
- Keith Vaz, Leicester East
- Valerie Vaz, Walsall South
- Thelma Walker, Colne Valley
- Tom Watson, West Bromwich East
- Catherine West, Hornsey and Wood Green
- Matthew Western, Warwick and Leamington
- Alan Whitehead, Southampton Test
- Martin Whitfield East Lothian
- Paul Williams, Stockton South
- Phil Wilson, Sedgefield
- Mohammad Yasin, Bedford
- Daniel Zeichner, Cambridge
- Liberal Democrat (11)
- Tom Brake, Carshalton and Wallington
- Vince Cable, Twickenham
- Alistair Carmichael, Orkney and Shetland
- Ed Davey, Kingston and Surbiton
- Tim Farron, Westmorland and Lonsdale
- Wera Hobhouse, Bath
- Christine Jardine, Edinburgh West
- Norman Lamb, North Norfolk
- Layla Moran, Oxford West and Abingdon
- Jamie Stone, Caithness, Sutherland and Easter Ross
- Jo Swinson, East Dunbartonshire
- Plaid Cymru (4)
- Jonathan Edwards, Carmarthen East and Dinefwr
- Ben Lake, Ceredigion
- Liz Saville Roberts, Dwyfor Meirionnydd
- Hywel Williams, Arfon
- Scottish National Party (35)
- Hannah Bardell, Livingston
- Mhairi Black, Paisley and Renfrewshire South
- Ian Blackford, Ross, Skye and Lochaber
- Kirsty Blackman, Aberdeen North
- Deidre Brock, Edinburgh North and Leith
- Alan Brown, Kilmarnock and Loudoun
- Lisa Cameron, East Kilbride, Strathaven and Lesmahagow
- Douglas Chapman, Dunfermline and West Fife
- Joanna Cherry, Edinburgh South West
- Ronnie Cowan, Inverclyde
- Angela Crawley, Lanark and Hamilton East
- Martyn Day, Linlithgow and East Falkirk
- Martin Docherty-Hughes, West Dunbartonshire
- Marion Fellows, Motherwell and Wishaw
- Stephen Gethins, North East Fife
- Patricia Gibson, North Ayrshire and Arran
- Patrick Grady, Glasgow North
- Peter Grant, Glenrothes
- Neil Gray, Airdrie and Shotts
- Drew Hendry, Inverness, Nairn, Badenoch and Strathspey
- Stewart Hosie, Dundee East
- Chris Law, Dundee West
- David Linden, Glasgow East
- Angus MacNeil, Na h-Eileanan an Iar
- John McNally, Falkirk
- Stewart McDonald, Glasgow South
- Stuart McDonald, Cumbernauld, Kilsyth and Kirkintilloch East
- Carol Monaghan, Glasgow North West
- Gavin Newlands, Paisley and Renfrewshire North
- Brendan O'Hara, Argyll and Bute
- Tommy Sheppard, Edinburgh East
- Chris Stephens, Glasgow South West
- Alison Thewliss, Glasgow Central
- Philippa Whitford, Central Ayrshire
- Pete Wishart, Perth and North Perthshire

Abstentions (1)

- Conservative (1)
- Douglas Ross, Moray (due to the birth of his child)

Meaningful vote
Ballot →	12 March 2019 (Note: Figure of 634 is based on 650 MPs minus seven Sinn Féin MPs who follow a policy of abstentionism and eight others: the Speaker John Bercow, the Deputy Speakers (Lindsay Hoyle, Eleanor Laing and Rosie Winterton), who do not vote; and the tellers (in this case, for the Ayes, Andrew Stephenson and Iain Stewart, and for the Noes, Thangam Debbonaire and Nic Dakin), whose votes are not taken into account. There was also a vacant seat due to the death of Paul Flynn.)
Yes	242 / 634
No	391 / 634
Abstentions	1 / 634
Sources: Hansard

=== Vote on "no deal" (13 March 2019) ===
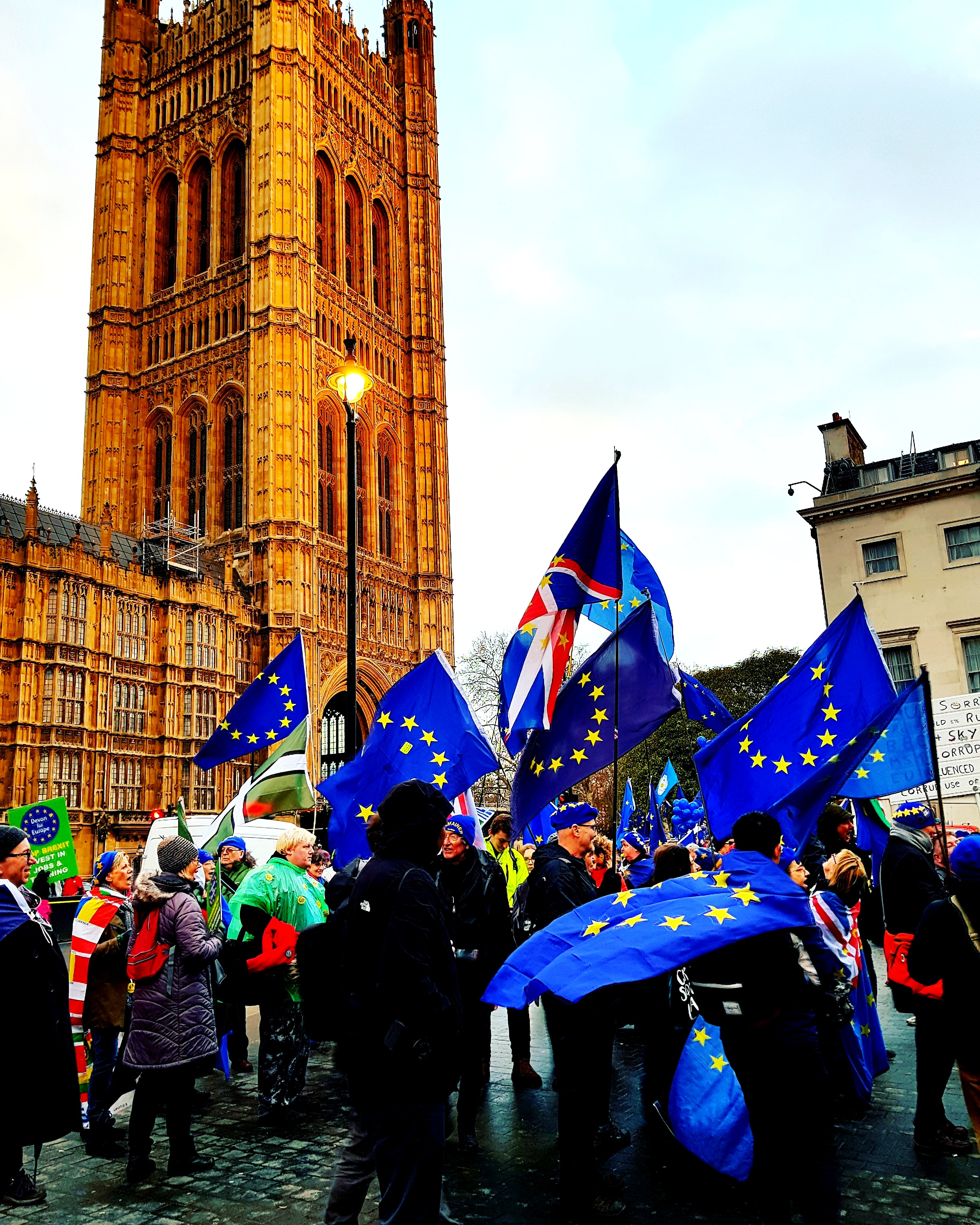
Protesters outside the Palace of Westminster, shortly before the vote on "no deal" on 13 March 2019

Under the terms of the 27 February motion, the defeat of the second meaningful vote means that the Government must promptly bring forward a motion regarding leaving the European Union without a withdrawal agreement. The motion, which blocked a no-deal Brexit, was presented on 13 March. Two amendments to the motion were voted upon: the first, tabled by Caroline Spelman and categorically rejecting no-deal in any circumstances, passed 312–308; the second, the "Malthouse compromise" supporting a so-called "managed no-deal Brexit", failed 164–374.

Spelman Amendment
Ballot →	13 March 2019
Yes	312 / 634
No	308 / 634
Abstentions	14 / 634
Sources: Hansard

Vote on rejecting no deal
Ballot →	13 March 2019
Yes	321 / 634
No	278 / 634
Abstentions	35 / 634
Sources: Hansard

=== Vote on extending Article 50 (14 March 2019) ===
As leaving the European Union without a deal was rejected, then the Government was required to bring to 14 March sitting a motion regarding extending Article 50 past 29 March.

The motion as tabled by the Government states that if the Withdrawal Agreement had not been ratified by 20 March, then the Government would seek an extension of Article 50 to 30 June, the last possible day that Brexit could take place without requiring British participation in May's European elections.

Four amendments were selected for debate alongside the motion:

- Amendment (h) tabled by Sarah Wollaston that removes the 30 June deadline and instructs the government to seek an extension to enable a second referendum was rejected by 85–334.
- Amendment (i) tabled by Hilary Benn that calls for an Article 50 extension and allows backbenchers to set the business of the House on 20 March 2019 was rejected by 312–314.
  - An amendment to the amendment tabled by Lucy Powell, which set the Article 50 extension to 30 June, was rejected by 311–314.
- Amendment (e) tabled by the Labour leadership that removes the 30 June deadline and instructs the government to enable a different approach to negotiations was rejected by 302–318.
- Amendment (j) tabled by Chris Bryant that prevents a third meaningful vote was not moved to a vote.

The main motion was approved by 412–202.

=== Vote on first Letwin amendment and Beckett amendment (25 March 2019) ===
Tabled by Oliver Letwin, the amendment passed 329–302 and required the Commons to hold a series of indicative votes on 27 March. Three ministers resigned from the government to support the amendment: Richard Harrington (business minister), Alistair Burt (foreign office), and Steve Brine (health). The Beckett amendment, tabled by Margaret Beckett, was defeated 314–311. It would have required Parliament to vote favourably for a "no deal" Brexit or request an extension to Article 50 if the government was within seven days of leaving the European Union without a deal. The amended main motion (Letwin but not Beckett) passed 327–300.

=== First round of indicative votes (27 March 2019) ===
As a result of the first Letwin amendment's success, indicative votes on Parliament's preferred Brexit options were held on 27 March. Eight propositions were voted upon, of which all eight failed.

Motion	Proposer	Ayes	Noes	Abs.	Majority
No Deal	John Baron	160	400	74	240
"Common Market 2.0"	Nick Boles	188	283	163	95
EFTA membership & EEA	George Eustice	65	377	192	312
Customs union	Kenneth Clarke	264	272	98	8
Labour's alternative	Jeremy Corbyn	237	307	90	70
Revocation to avoid No Deal	Joanna Cherry	184	293	157	109
Referendum on the Withdrawal Agreement	Margaret Beckett	268	295	71	27
"Managed No Deal"	Marcus Fysh	139	422	73	283

In a departure from Westminster parliamentary convention, all eight votes took place simultaneously, using ballot papers, rather than having MPs walk through lobbies to signify their vote.

=== Third "meaningful vote" (29 March 2019) ===
As parliament had agreed to an extension of Article 50 to 30 June the possibility of a third meaningful vote was raised and the Speaker ruled that "the same proposition or substantially the same proposition" could not be brought back in the same parliamentary session. The Political Declaration was then removed from the ballot in order to make it a different proposition.

The third vote meaningful vote on the Withdrawal Agreement was then able to take place on 29 March 2019. May promised to resign as Prime Minister if the Withdrawal Agreement was passed. In the end, May's deal was voted down again, albeit by a smaller margin than in the previous two votes.

Meaningful vote
Ballot →	29 March 2019
Yes	286 / 634
No	344 / 634
Abstentions/Absent	4 / 634
Sources: Hansard

=== Second round of indicative votes (1 April 2019) ===
Further indicative votes were held on 1 April on propositions chosen by the Speaker.

Motion	Proposer	Ayes	Noes	Abs.	Majority
with a "Customs Union"	Kenneth Clarke	273	276	85	3
with "Common Market 2.0"	Nick Boles	261	282	91	21
hold a "Confirmatory Public Vote"	Peter Kyle and Phil Wilson	280	292	62	12
"Revocation of Article 50 to avoid No Deal"	Joanna Cherry	191	292	151	101

Once again, in a departure from parliamentary convention, rather than having MPs walk through lobbies to indicate their vote choice, all four votes took place simultaneously using ballot papers. In response to his and all other propositions being rejected, Nick Boles resigned from the Conservative party in protest, citing his party's "refusal to compromise".

=== Cooper–Letwin Bill (3 April 2019) ===
Since none of the tabled propositions in the second round of indicative votes could command a majority in the House of Commons, a third round of indicative votes was planned to be held on 3 April. On the day of 3 April 2019, the House of Commons focused instead on debating the "European Union (Withdrawal) (No. 5) Bill". This bill was otherwise known as the Cooper–Letwin Bill, after its chief sponsors Yvette Cooper (Labour) and Oliver Letwin (Conservative). The bill places an obligation on the Government to seek consent for any or no extensions to the date of withdrawal from the EU. To do so, the House of Commons first debated a business of the House motion to allow the Bill to be brought in for debate on that day. There was one proposed amendment to the Business of the House motion, which would have sought to schedule more indicative votes for 8 April 2019; this failed in the first tied vote since 1993.

Further indicative votes
Ballot →	3 April 2019
Yes	310 / 634
No	310 / 634
Abstentions	14 / 634
Sources: Reuters, CommonsVotes

The tie was broken by the Speaker in favour of "No" (in accordance with Speaker Denison's rule), meaning the motion was rejected. The lack of passage of this motion meant that no further indicative votes would be scheduled by the House of Commons to be held on 8 April 2019.

After losing the third vote and the approval of the Cooper–Letwin Bill at the third reading by 313–312, May and her cabinet considered the possibility of bringing the withdrawal agreement back to parliament for a fourth vote. In mid-May, May said that she would bring the withdrawal agreement to the parliament in the first week of June. Due to huge opposition to the new agreement, May postponed the publication from 24 May to 4 June, and subsequently resigned as prime minister.

=== Prorogation of parliament ===
Boris Johnson, elected Conservative Party leader in July, and invited by the Queen to become Prime Minister, announced on 28 August that he had requested the Queen to prorogue Parliament from between 9 September and 12 September until the beginning of a new session on 14 October. On the advice of the (minimally quorate) Privy Council and in accordance with constitutional convention, the Queen granted this request the same day.

=== Benn Bill (4 September 2019) ===
Once Parliament reconvened from summer recess, Labour MP Hilary Benn presented a bill that would rule out a unilateral no-deal Brexit by forcing the Government to reach an Agreement, get parliamentary approval for no-deal Brexit, or, if neither condition is fulfilled by 19 October, then request the European Council for an extension to the Brexit withdrawal date until 31 January 2020.

On 3 September, Oliver Letwin submitted a motion for an emergency debate on this bill, in accordance with Standing Order No. 24. This motion, to allow the debate for the following day, passed, 328 to 301. 21 Conservative MPs voted for the motion and were then removed from the Conservative whip, as Johnson had threatened to do in advance. The 21 MPs were Guto Bebb, Richard Benyon, Steve Brine, Alastair Burt, Greg Clark, Ken Clarke, David Gauke, Justine Greening, Dominic Grieve, Sam Gyimah, Philip Hammond, Stephen Hammond, Richard Harrington, Margot James, Letwin, Anne Milton, Caroline Nokes, Antoinette Sandbach, Nicholas Soames, Rory Stewart and Ed Vaizey. This, combined with Phillip Lee’s defection to the Liberal Democrats earlier that day, gave the Opposition a 43-seat majority over the Government.

Johnson further announced his intention to seek an early general election. Under the Fixed-Term Parliaments Act, a two-thirds majority of the House of Commons is necessary for this motion to pass, but opposition leaders indicated that they would refuse support until after Benn's bill is passed.

On 4 September, the Benn Bill passed second reading by 329 to 300; a 22nd Conservative, Caroline Spelman, voted against the Government position. Later the same day MPs subsequently rejected Johnson's motion to call an October general election, failing to achieve the two-thirds Commons majority needed under the Fixed-term Parliaments Act, in a vote of 298 to 56. Labour MPs abstained from the vote.

On 9 September, the Benn Bill was granted royal assent. On the same day, MPs backed a motion calling for the publication of all government communications relating to no-deal Brexit planning and the suspension of Parliament, voting 311 to 302. A second government motion calling for an early general election failed to achieve the required super-majority, with 293 MPs voting in favour of it. Parliament was then prorogued until 14 October. The prorogation was subsequently overturned on 24 September following legal challenges against the government, and parliament reconvened the following day, with a shorter prorogation then taking place for six days, from 8 to 14 October.

=== Second Letwin amendment (19 October 2019) ===
Following further negotiations between the UK and EU, a revised withdrawal agreement was reached on 17 October. A special Saturday sitting of Parliament was held two days later to debate the new agreement. MPs passed the second Letwin amendment 322 to 306, which withheld Parliament's approval until legislation implementing the deal has been passed, and forced the Government to request the EU for a delay to Brexit until 31 January 2020. The amended motion was then passed by MPs without a vote as the Government effectively accepted defeat. On 21 October the Speaker of the House of Commons John Bercow refused a government request to hold a vote on the Brexit deal, citing their previous decision to withdraw it.

On the evening of 19 October, 10 Downing Street confirmed that Boris Johnson would send a letter to the EU requesting an extension, but would not sign it. EU Council President Donald Tusk subsequently confirmed receipt of the letter, which Johnson had described as "Parliament's letter, not my letter". In addition, Johnson sent a second letter expressing the view that any further delay to Brexit would be a mistake.

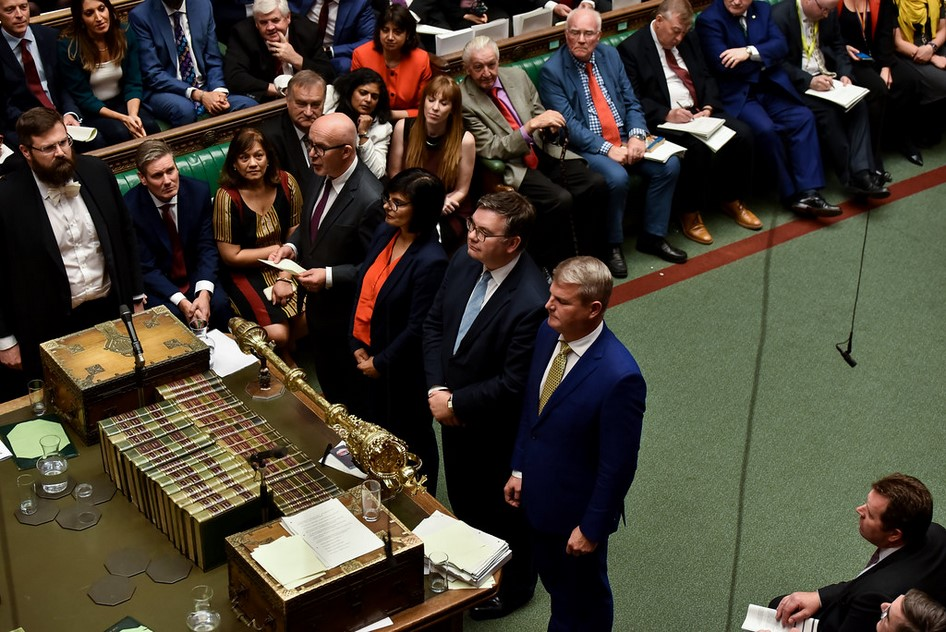
Results of the division announced at 14:50. Tellers: Matt Western, Thangam Debbonaire, Stuart Andrew (on the right) and Iain Stewart (second from right).

Letwin Amendment
Ballot →	19 October 2019
Yes	322 / 634
No	306 / 634
Abstentions	6 / 634
Sources: Reuters, CommonsVotes

=== Withdrawal Agreement debate (22 October 2019) ===
On 21 October, the government published the Withdrawal Agreement Bill and proposed three days of debate for opposition MPs to scrutinise it. The government brought the recently revised EU Withdrawal Bill to the House of Commons for debate on the evening of 22 October 2019. MPs voted to give the Bill a second reading which was passed by 329 votes to 299, and the timetable for debating the Bill, which was defeated by 322 votes to 308. Prior to the votes, Johnson had stated that if his timetable failed to generate the support needed to pass in parliament he would abandon attempts to get the deal approved and would seek a general election. Following the vote Johnson announced that the legislation would be paused while he consulted with other EU leaders.

2nd Reading of Withdrawal Agreement Bill		Approval of a rapid timetable for Brexit bill	
Ballot →	22 October 2019	Ballot →	22 October 2019
Aye	329 / 634	Aye	308 / 634
No	299 / 634	No	322 / 634
Abstentions	6 / 634	Abstentions	4 / 634
Sources: Reuters, CommonsVotes		Sources: Reuters, CommonsVotes	

=== Technical withdrawal amendments (23 October 2019) ===
On 23 October, the House of Commons debated three technical pieces of legislation relating to the UK's withdrawal from the EU. The legislation debate addressed the repeal of certain technical provisions enshrined in UK law regarding the EU. Were the vote to pass for these three acts they would only come into effect if the UK were to ultimately leave the EU. The three items debated dealt with amendments to existing UK law in order to repeal 1) the freedom of movement provisions of the EU 2) regulatory oversight of the UK by third party (EU) countries 3) regulations on financial services codified by the EU. All three amendments went to a division vote, and all three passed the House of Commons vote.

Repeal of Freedom of Movement		Repeal of EU Regulatory Oversight		Repeal of EU Financial Services Regulations	
Ballot →	23 October 2019	Ballot →	23 October 2019	Ballot →	23 October 2019
Aye	315 / 639	Aye	315 / 639	Aye	315 / 639
No	286 / 639	No	287 / 639	No	284 / 639
Abstentions	38 / 639	Abstentions	37 / 639	Abstentions	40 / 639
Sources: CommonsVotes		Sources: CommonsVotes		Sources: CommonsVotes	

== Votes during the 58th Parliament of the United Kingdom (2019–24) ==
=== Withdrawal Agreement Bill debate & second reading (20 December 2019) ===
On 20 December 2019, immediately after the state opening of Parliament following the 2019 United Kingdom general election (in which the Conservative Party secured a large majority of 80 seats), the Government presented another Bill to ratify its draft withdrawal agreement. It also proposed another guillotine motion to curtail debate on the Bill.

2nd Reading of Withdrawal Agreement Bill		Approval of a rapid timetable for Brexit bill	
Ballot →	20 December 2019	Ballot →	20 December 2019
Aye	358 / 634	Aye	353 / 634
No	234 / 634	No	243 / 634
Abstentions	6 / 634	Abstentions	4 / 634
Sources:www.parliament.uk, Hansard		Sources:www.parliament.uk, Hansard	

=== Amendment debate & third reading (9 January 2020) ===
Afterwards, a proposed amendment by Ian Blackford to fail third reading was defeated by 62 ayes to 329 noes, and the reading itself passed by 330–231.

Amendment to Brexit Withdrawal Agreement Bill		3rd Reading of Withdrawal Agreement Bill	
Ballot →	9 January 2020	Ballot →	9 January 2020
Aye	62 / 634	Aye	330 / 634
No	329 / 634	No	231 / 634
Sources:www.parliament.uk, Hansard		Sources:www.parliament.uk, Hansard	
