= Mike Weir (politician) =

British politician (born 1957)

Michael Weir

SNP Chief Whip
- In office 20 May 2015 – 9 June 2017
- Preceded by: Stewart Hosie
- Succeeded by: Patrick Grady

Member of Parliament for Angus
- In office 7 June 2001 – 3 May 2017
- Preceded by: Andrew Welsh
- Succeeded by: Kirstene Hair

Personal details
- Born: 24 March 1957 (age 69) Arbroath, Angus, Scotland
- Party: Scottish National Party
- Relations: Married
- Children: Two daughters
- Education: University of Aberdeen
- Profession: Solicitor

Michael Fraser Weir (born 24 March 1957) is a Scottish National Party (SNP) politician who served as Member of Parliament (MP) for Angus in Scotland from 2001 to 2017 when he lost his seat to the Conservative Party. He served as the SNP Chief Whip in the House of Commons. Weir used to be a councillor and Convenor of the General Purposes Committee of Angus District Council. Prior to his election in 2001, he was a solicitor and Partner for J&DG Shiell in Brechin.

== Background ==
He was born in Arbroath and educated at Arbroath High School and Aberdeen University, from where he graduated LLB in 1979. Whilst at university Weir served as president of the Aberdeen University Scottish Nationalist Association and was a member of the Students Representative Council. He has also served as a member of the national executive of the Young Scottish Nationalists and from 1984 to 1988 he served as a councillor on Angus District Council, where he was convenor of general purposes. He worked as a solicitor in Montrose and Kirkcaldy before settling in Brechin, where he was a partner (latterly senior partner) in the firm of J&DG Shiell. He is married with two daughters.

== House of Commons ==
Weir fought Aberdeen South in the 1987 general election, coming fourth.

He was first elected to Parliament in 2001 and in his first term was the SNP Spokesperson on Trade and Industry and Work and Pensions, as well as being a member of the Scottish Affairs Select Committee (2001–05). In 2005, Weir held the new seat of Angus which had been substantially changed in the boundary changes for that election. Although he went into the election with a notional majority of only 532 he achieved a majority of 1601 over the Conservatives. Since 2005 Mike Weir has been the SNP Westminster Spokesperson on Business and Enterprise (which includes energy) and the Environment. He has been an outspoken opponent of nuclear power and has pursued a relentless campaign on the future of the Post Office network. Mike Weir sat on the Business, Innovation and Skills Select Committee (2005–09) and was a member of the Chairmen's Panel/Panel of Chairs from (2005–10). He served on the Energy and Climate Change Select Committee from 2009 to 2010.

Weir has championed issues relating to energy including calling for "social tariffs" for poorer utility customers and opposing pre-payment meters

As postal affairs spokesperson Weir led SNP opposition to privatisation of the Royal Mail

He raised the issue of local driving test centre closures at Westminster

Mike Weir served as the SNP's Chief Whip in the House of Commons during the 2015-17 Parliament.

Parliament of the United Kingdom
Preceded by Andrew Welsh	Member of Parliament for Angus; 2001–2017	Succeeded by Kirstene Hair
