= Kirstene Hair =

Scottish Conservative politician

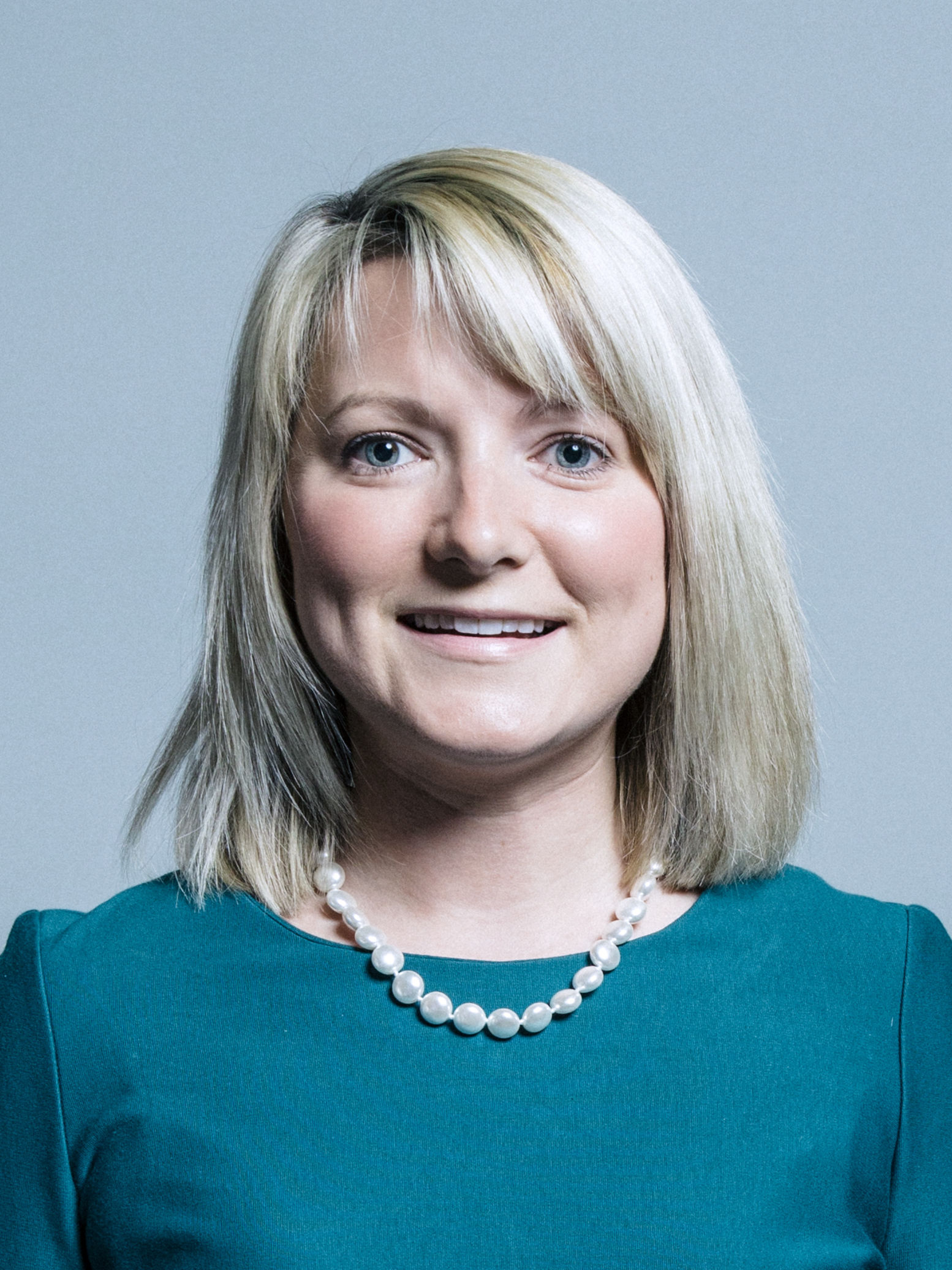
- Official portrait, 2017

Member of Parliament for Angus
- In office 8 June 2017 – 6 November 2019
- Preceded by: Mike Weir
- Succeeded by: Dave Doogan

Personal details
- Born: 12 August 1989 (age 37) Brechin, Angus, Scotland
- Party: Conservative
- Education: University of Aberdeen

Kirstene Janette Hair (born 12 August 1989) is a former Scottish Conservative Party politician. She was the Member of Parliament (MP) for Angus between 2017 and 2019.

== Early life and career ==
Hair was born on 12 August 1989 in Brechin, Angus, Scotland. She grew up in a large farming family based in Mains of Ardovie Farm. Hair has one younger brother and two older sisters. She was educated at Brechin High School where she was the head girl. Hair went on to study politics at the University of Aberdeen.

Hair worked at the Scottish publishing company DC Thomson. She stood as a Scottish Conservative Party candidate for Angus South at the 2016 Scottish Parliament election, and was defeated by incumbent Scottish National Party (SNP) MSP Graeme Dey.

== Parliamentary career ==
Hair was elected to the House of Commons in 2017, overturning a majority of 11,230 to unseat the Scottish National Party (SNP) chief whip, Mike Weir. The constituency had been represented by an SNP MP since its creation in 1997.

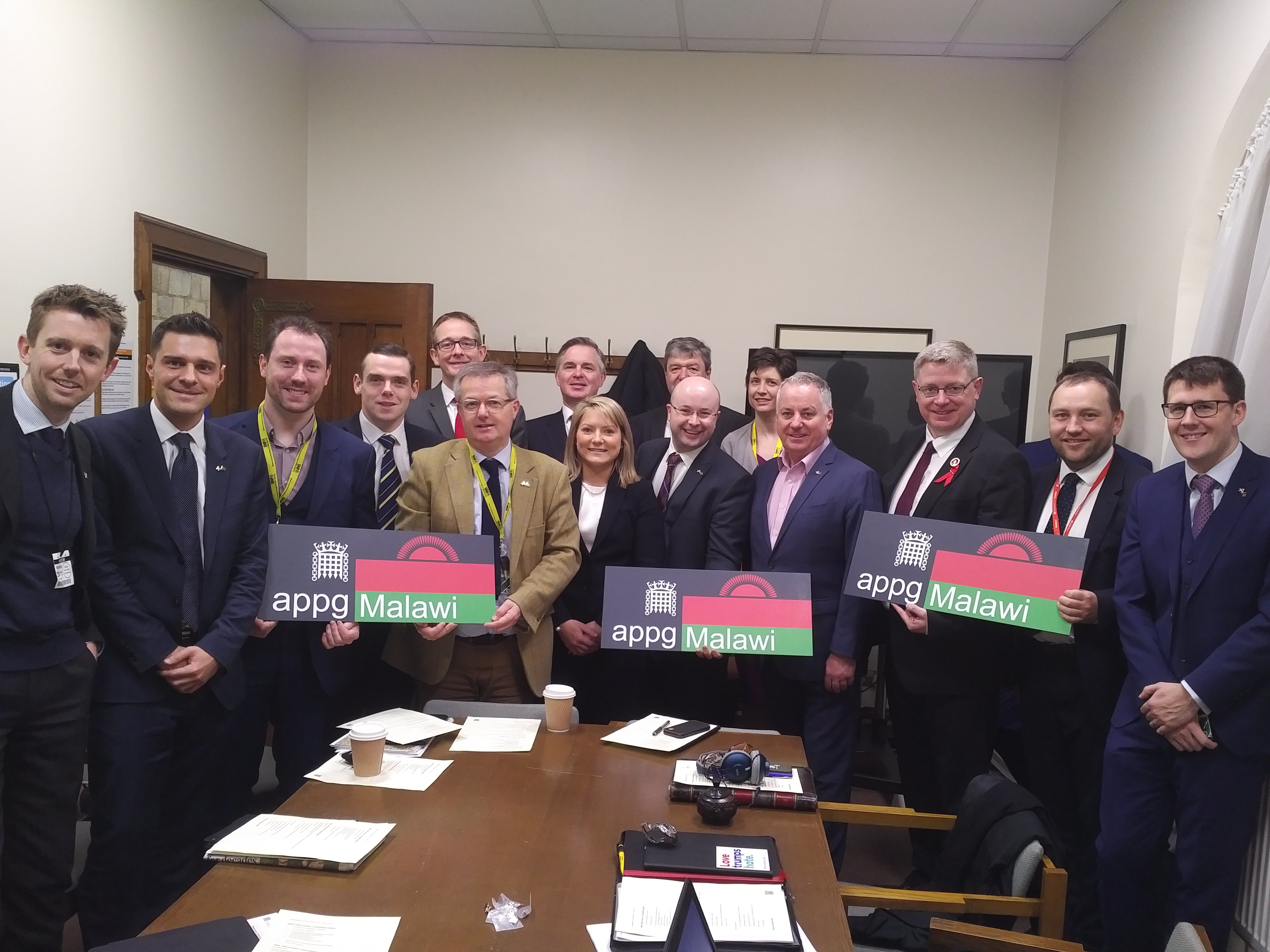
She was the first secretary of the All-Party Parliamentary Group on Malawi

In the UK Parliament, she was a member of the Scottish Affairs Select Committee, Home Affairs Select Committee, and Women and Equalities Committee. She had been a member of the Regulatory Reform Committee since November 2017.

Hair did not vote in the 2016 UK EU Membership referendum. In September 2017, she commented that she chose not to vote at the time as she could not decide on whether to support the UK leaving or remaining within the EU as she felt that there were strong arguments on both sides. She voted for then-Prime Minister Theresa May's Brexit withdrawal agreement in early 2019. In the indicative votes on 27 March, Hair voted against a referendum on a withdrawal agreement, against a customs union with the EU, and against single market membership.

In January 2019, she was appointed as a parliamentary private secretary (PPS) in the Ministry of Justice. In June, Hair became the PPS to David Mundell, Secretary of State for Scotland. In October, she voted for Prime Minister Boris Johnson's Brexit withdrawal agreement. In the December general election, Hair lost her seat to the SNP candidate, Dave Doogan.

In September 2020, she became an advisor to the new leader of the Scottish Conservatives, Douglas Ross. Kirstene Hair now runs Empower Coaching, a firm which encourages organisations and businesses to support women into securing senior roles.

Parliament of the United Kingdom
Preceded by Mike Weir	Member of Parliament for Angus; 2017–2019	Succeeded by Dave Doogan
