= Angus (UK Parliament constituency) =

UK Parliament constituency (1997–2024)

Coordinates: 56.797°N 2.921°W

- Former county constituency for the House of Commons
- Boundary of Angus in Scotland
- Subdivision: Angus
- Major settlements: Arbroath, Brechin, Forfar and Montrose

1997–2024
- Created from: East Angus; North Tayside
- Replaced by: Angus and Perthshire Glens; Arbroath and Broughty Ferry

Angus was a constituency of the House of Commons of the Parliament of the United Kingdom. It elected one Member of Parliament (MP) by the first-past-the-post voting system.

It was created for the 1997 general election, largely replacing East Angus. As a result of boundary changes for the 2005 general election, the boundaries became quite different from those of the Angus Scottish Parliament constituency, which was created in 1999 and abolished in 2011.

The constituency was dominated by farmland, and included the towns of Arbroath, Montrose, Brechin and Forfar.

Following the 2023 periodic review of Westminster constituencies, the seat boundaries were altered, with expansion into northern parts of the Perth and Kinross council, partly offset by the loss of Arbroath and surrounding areas. As a consequence, it was renamed Angus and Perthshire Glens, and first contested at the 2024 general election.

== Boundaries ==
Map of boundaries 2010-2024

1997–2005: The Angus District electoral divisions of Arbroath Central, Arbroath East, Arbroath North and Central Angus, Carnoustie East and Arbroath West, Carnoustie West, Montrose North, and Montrose South; and the City of Dundee District electoral divisions of Monifieth and Sidlaw.

2005–2024: The Angus Council wards of Arbirlot and Hospitalfield, Arbroath North, Brechin North Esk, Brechin South Esk, Brechin West, Brothock, Cliffburn, Forfar Central, Forfar East, Forfar South, Forfar West, Harbour, Hayshead and Lunan, Keptie, Kirriemuir East, Kirriemuir West, Letham and Friockheim, Montrose Central, Montrose Ferryden, Montrose Hillside, Montrose West, and Westfield and Dean.

The constituency covered the Angus council area, minus an area round the Dundee City council area, which was divided between the Dundee East and Dundee West constituencies.

Major towns in the House of Commons constituency were Arbroath, Brechin, Forfar, Kirriemuir, and Montrose.

== Members of Parliament ==
Election	Member	Party
1997	Andrew Welsh	SNP
2001	Mike Weir	SNP
2017	Kirstene Hair	Conservative
2019	Dave Doogan	SNP

== Election results ==
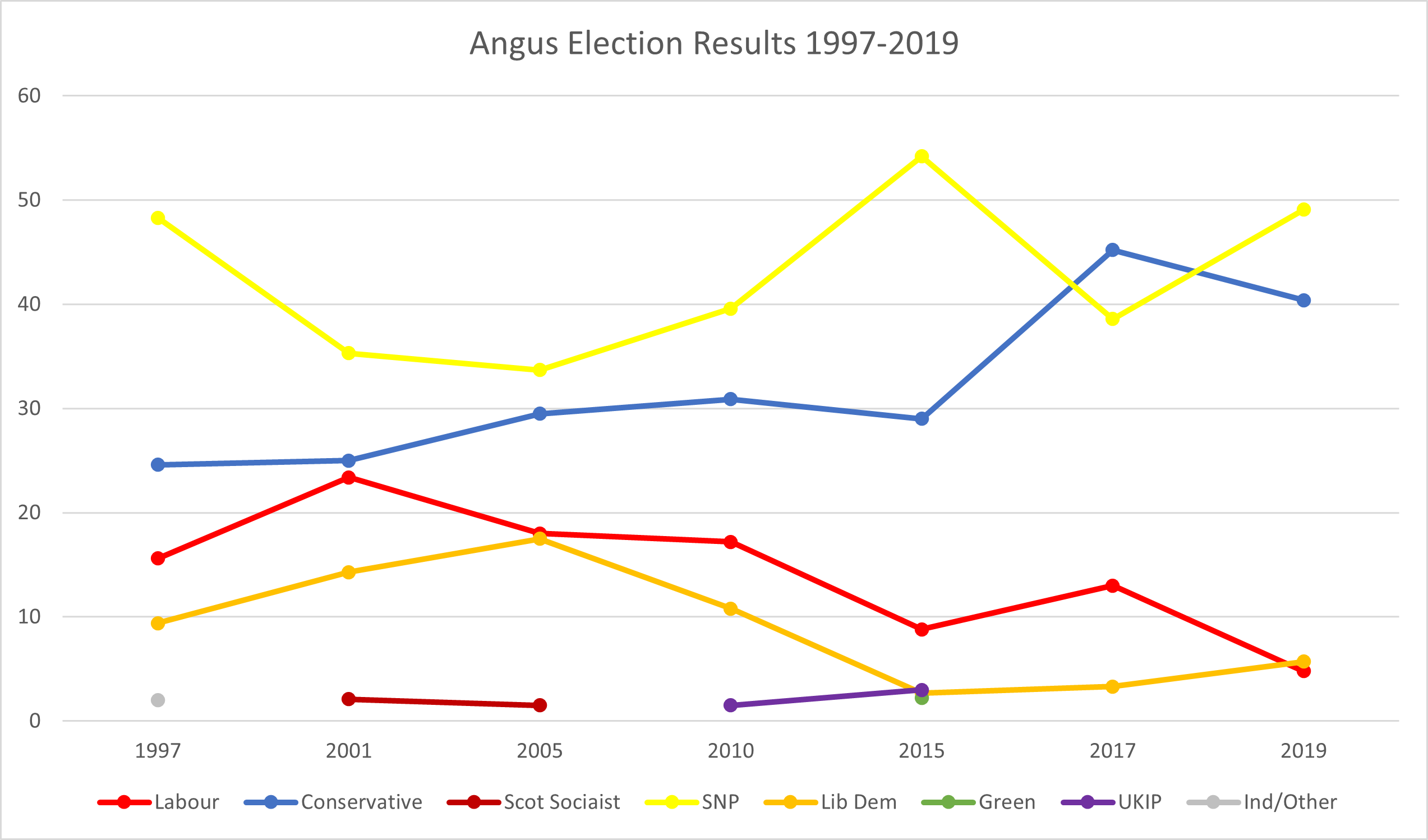

=== Elections in the 2010s ===
General election 2019: Angus
Party	Candidate	Votes	%	±%
SNP	Dave Doogan	21,216	49.1	+10.5
Conservative	Kirstene Hair	17,421	40.4	−4.8
Liberal Democrats	Ben Lawrie	2,482	5.7	+2.4
Labour	Monique Miller	2,051	4.8	−8.2
Majority		3,795	8.7	N/A
Turnout		43,170	67.5	+4.5
SNP gain from Conservative		Swing	+7.7	

General election 2017: Angus
Party	Candidate	Votes	%	±%
Conservative	Kirstene Hair	18,148	45.2	+16.2
SNP	Mike Weir	15,503	38.6	−15.6
Labour	William Campbell	5,233	13.0	+4.2
Liberal Democrats	Clive Sneddon	1,308	3.3	+0.6
Majority		2,645	6.6	N/A
Turnout		40,192	63.0	−4.6
Conservative gain from SNP		Swing	+16.3	

General election 2015: Angus
Party	Candidate	Votes	%	±%
SNP	Mike Weir	24,130	54.2	+14.6
Conservative	Derek Wann	12,900	29.0	−1.9
Labour	Gerard McMahon	3,919	8.8	−8.4
UKIP	Calum Walker	1,355	3.0	+1.5
Liberal Democrats	Sanjay Samani	1,216	2.7	−8.1
Green	David Mumford	965	2.2	New
Majority		11,230	25.2	+16.5
Turnout		44,485	67.6	+7.2
SNP hold		Swing	+8.3	

General election 2010: Angus
Party	Candidate	Votes	%	±%
SNP	Mike Weir	15,020	39.6	+5.9
Conservative	Alberto Costa	11,738	30.9	+1.4
Labour	Kevin Hutchens	6,535	17.2	−0.8
Liberal Democrats	Sanjay Samani	4,090	10.8	−6.7
UKIP	Martin Gray	577	1.5	New
Majority		3,282	8.7	+4.5
Turnout		37,960	60.4	−0.1
SNP hold		Swing	+2.2	

=== Elections in the 2000s ===
General election 2005: Angus
Party	Candidate	Votes	%	±%
SNP	Mike Weir	12,840	33.7	+0.5
Conservative	Sandy Bushby	11,239	29.5	−2.1
Labour	Douglas Bradley	6,850	18.0	−0.3
Liberal Democrats	Scott Rennie	6,660	17.5	+2.7
Scottish Socialist	Alan Manley	556	1.5	−0.4
Majority		1,601	4.2	+1.6
Turnout		38,145	60.5	+6.4
SNP hold		Swing	+1.3	

General election 2001: Angus
Party	Candidate	Votes	%	±%
SNP	Mike Weir	12,347	35.3	−13.0
Conservative	Marcus Booth	8,736	25.0	+0.4
Labour	Ian McFatridge	8,183	23.4	+7.8
Liberal Democrats	Peter Nield	5,015	14.3	+4.9
Scottish Socialist	Bruce Wallace	732	2.1	New
Majority		3,611	10.3	−13.4
Turnout		35,013	59.3	−12.8
SNP hold		Swing	−6.7	

=== Elections in the 1990s ===
General election 1997: Angus
Party	Candidate	Votes	%	±%
SNP	Andrew Welsh	20,792	48.3	
Conservative	Sebastian A.A. Leslie	10,603	24.6	
Labour	Catherine Taylor	6,733	15.6	
Liberal Democrats	Dick B. Speirs	4,065	9.4	
Referendum	Brian A. Taylor	883	2.0	
Majority		10,189	23.7	
Turnout		43,076	72.1	
SNP win (new seat)				
