= List of United Kingdom Conservative MPs (2005–2010) =

This is a list of Conservative Party members of Parliament (MPs) elected to the British House of Commons for the 43rd Parliament of the United Kingdom. This includes MPs elected at the 2005 general election and those subsequently elected in by-elections.

The names in italics are those who did not serve throughout this Parliament and the names with a * next to them are MPs who first entered Parliament in a by-election.

== MPs ==
Member of Parliament	Constituency	In Constituency Since	First Entered Parliament	Notes
Adam Afriyie	Windsor	2005	2005	
Peter Ainsworth	East Surrey	1992	1992	
David Amess	Southend West	1997	1983	
Michael Ancram, 13th Marquess of Lothian, PC, QC	Devizes	1992	1974	
James Arbuthnot	North East Hampshire	1997	1987	
Peter Atkinson	Hexham	1992	1992	
Richard Bacon	South Norfolk	2001	2001	
Tony Baldry	Banbury	1983	1983	
Gregory Barker	Bexhill and Battle	2001	2001	
John Baron	Billericay	2001	2001	
Henry Bellingham	North West Norfolk	2001	1983	
Richard Benyon	Newbury	2005	2005	
John Bercow	Buckingham	1997	1997	Elected Speaker of the House of Commons, 2009
Sir Paul Beresford	Mole Valley	1997	1992	
Brian Binley	Northampton South	2005	2005	
Crispin Blunt	Reigate	1997	1997	
Peter Bone	Wellingborough	2005	2005	
Tim Boswell	Daventry	1987	1987	
Peter Bottomley*	Worthing West	1987	1975	
Graham Brady	Altrincham and Sale West	1997	1997	
Julian Brazier TD	Canterbury	1987	1987	
James Brokenshire	Hornchurch	2005	2005	
Angela Browning	Tiverton and Honiton	1997	1992	
Simon Burns	Chelmsford West	1997	1987	
David Burrowes	Enfield Southgate	2005	2005	
Alistair Burt	North East Bedfordshire	2001	1983	
Sir John Butterfill FRICS	Bournemouth West	1983	1983	
David Cameron	Witney	2001	2001	Party leader
Douglas Carswell	Harwich	2005	2005	
William Cash*	Stone	1997	1984	
Christopher Chope OBE	Christchurch	1997	1983	
James Clappison	Hertsmere	1992	1992	
Greg Clark	Tunbridge Wells	2005	2005	
Kenneth Clarke QC	Rushcliffe	1970	1970	
Geoffrey Clifton-Brown	Cotswold	1997	1992	
Derek Conway TD	Old Bexley and Sidcup	2001	1983	
Sir Patrick Cormack FSA	South Staffordshire	1970	1983	
Geoffrey Cox QC	Torridge and West Devon	2005	2005	
Stephen Crabb	Preseli Pembrokeshire	2005	2005	
David Curry	Skipton and Ripon	1987	1987	
David Davies	Monmouth	2005	2005	
Philip Davies	Shipley	2005	2005	
Quentin Davies	Grantham and Stamford	1997	1987	Defected to Labour Party 26 June 2007
David Davis	Haltemprice and Howden	1997	1987	
Jonathan Djanogly	Huntingdon	2001	2001	
Stephen Dorrell	Charnwood	1997	1979	
Nadine Dorries	Mid Bedfordshire	2005	2005	
James Duddridge	Rochford and Southend East	2005	2005	
Alan Duncan	Rutland and Melton	1992	1992	
Iain Duncan Smith	Chingford and Woodford Green	1992	1997	
Philip Dunne	Ludlow	2005	2005	
Tobias Ellwood	Bournemouth East	2005	2005	
Nigel Evans	Ribble Valley	1992	1992	
David Evennett	Bexleyheath and Crayford	2005	1983	
Michael Fabricant	Lichfield	1997	1992	
Michael Fallon	Sevenoaks	1997	1983	
Mark Field	London and Westminster, Cities of	2001	2001	
Eric Forth*	Bromley and Chislehurst	1983	1997	Died 2006
Liam Fox	Woodspring	1992	1992	
Mark Francois	Rayleigh	2001	2001	
Christopher Fraser	South West Norfolk	2005	1997	
Roger Gale	North Thanet	1983	1983	
Edward Garnier QC	Harborough	1992	1992	
David Gauke	South West Hertfordshire	2005	2005	
Nick Gibb	Bognor Regis and Littlehampton	1997	1997	
Cheryl Gillan	Chesham and Amersham	1992	1992	
Paul Goodman	Wycombe	2001	2001	
Robert Goodwill	Scarborough and Whitby	2005	2005	
Michael Gove	Surrey Heath	2005	2005	
James Gray	North Wiltshire	1997	1997	
Chris Grayling	Epsom and Ewell	2001	2001	
Damian Green	Ashford	1997	1997	
Justine Greening	Putney	2005	2005	
John Greenway	Ryedale	1987	1987	
Dominic Grieve	Beaconsfield	1997	1997	
John Gummer	Suffolk Coastal	1983	1970	
William Hague*	Richmond, North Yorkshire	1989	1989	
Philip Hammond	Runnymede and Weybridge	1997	1997	
Stephen Hammond	Wimbledon	2005	2005	
Greg Hands	Hammersmith and Fulham	2005	2005	
Mark Harper	Forest of Dean	2005	2005	
Sir Alan Haselhurst*	Saffron Walden	1977	1970	Deputy Speaker
John Hayes	South Holland and The Deepings	1997	1997	
Oliver Heald	North East Hertfordshire	1997	1992	
David Heathcoat-Amory	Wells	1983	1983	
Charles Hendry	Wealden	2001	1992	
Nick Herbert	Arundel and South Downs	2005	2005	
Mark Hoban	Fareham	2001	2001	
Douglas Hogg, 3rd Viscount Hailsham QC	Sleaford and North Hykeham	1997	1979	
Philip Hollobone	Kettering	2005	2005	
Adam Holloway	Gravesham	2005	2005	
John Horam	Orpington	1992	1970	
Michael Howard QC	Folkestone and Hythe	1983	1983	
Gerald Howarth	Aldershot	1983	1997	
Jeremy Hunt	South West Surrey	2005	2005	
Nick Hurd	Ruislip-Northwood	2005	2005	
Michael Jack	Fylde	1987	1987	
Stewart Jackson	Peterborough	2005	2005	
Bernard Jenkin	North Essex	1992	1992	
Boris Johnson	Henley	2001	2001	Resigned in 2008 in order to assume the post of Mayor of London.
David Jones	Clwyd West	2005	2005	
Daniel Kawczynski	Shrewsbury and Atcham	2005	2005	
Robert Key	Salisbury	1983	1983	
Julie Kirkbride	Bromsgrove	1997	1997	
Greg Knight	East Yorkshire	2001	1983	
Eleanor Laing	Epping Forest	1997	1997	
Jacqui Lait	Beckenham	1997	1992	
Mark Lancaster	North East Milton Keynes	2005	2005	
Andrew Lansley CBE	South Cambridgeshire	1997	1997	
Edward Leigh	Gainsborough	1983	1983	
Oliver Letwin	West Dorset	1997	1997	
Julian Lewis	New Forest East	1997	1997	
Ian Liddell-Grainger, Baron of Ayton	Bridgwater	2001	2001	
David Lidington	Aylesbury	1992	1992	
Peter Lilley	Hitchin and Harpenden	1997	1983	
Sir Michael Lord	Central Suffolk and North Ipswich	1997	1997	
Tim Loughton	East Worthing and Shoreham	1997	1997	
Peter Luff	Mid Worcestershire	1997	1992	
Andrew MacKay*	Bracknell	1997	1977	
David Maclean*	Penrith and The Border	1983	1983	
Anne Main	St Albans	2005	2005	
Humfrey Malins CBE	Woking	1997	1983	
John Maples	Stratford-on-Avon	1997	1983	
Michael Mates	East Hampshire	1983	1974	
Francis Maude	Horsham	1997	1983	
Theresa May	Maidenhead	1997	1997	
Anne McIntosh	Vale of York	1997	1997	
Patrick McLoughlin*	West Derbyshire	1986	1986	
Patrick Mercer OBE	Newark	2001	2001	
Maria Miller	Basingstoke	2005	2005	
Anne Milton	Guildford	2005	2005	
Andrew Mitchell	Sutton Coldfield	2001	1987	
Malcolm Moss	North East Cambridgeshire	1987	1987	
David Mundell	Dumfriesshire, Clydesdale and Tweeddale	2005	2005	
Andrew Murrison	Westbury	2001	2001	
Bob Neill*	Bromley and Chislehurst	2006	2006	Elected in 2006 by-election
Brooks Newmark	Braintree	2005	2005	
Stephen O'Brien*	Eddisbury	1999	1999	
George Osborne	Tatton	2001	2001	
Richard Ottaway	Croydon South	1992	1983	
James Paice	South East Cambridgeshire	1987	1987	
Owen Paterson	North Shropshire	1997	1997	
Andrew Pelling	Croydon Central	2005	2005	
Mike Penning	Hemel Hempstead	2005	2005	
John Penrose	Weston-Super-Mare	2005	2005	
Eric Pickles	Brentwood and Ongar	1992	1992	
Mark Prisk	Hertford and Stortford	2001	2001	
Mark Pritchard	Wrekin, The	2005	2005	
John Randall	Uxbridge	1997	1997	
John Redwood	Wokingham	1987	1987	
Sir Malcolm Rifkind KCMG QC	Kensington and Chelsea	2005	1974	
Andrew Robathan	Blaby	1992	1992	
Hugh Robertson	Faversham and Mid Kent	2001	2001	
Laurence Robertson	Tewkesbury	1997	1997	
Andrew Rosindell	Romford	2001	2001	
David Ruffley	Bury St Edmunds	1997	1997	
Lee Scott	Ilford North	2005	2005	
Andrew Selous	South West Bedfordshire	2001	2001	
Grant Shapps	Welwyn Hatfield	2005	2005	
Richard Shepherd	Aldridge-Brownhills	1979	1979	
Mark Simmonds	Boston and Skegness	2001	2001	
Keith Simpson	Mid Norfolk	1997	1997	
Nicholas Soames	Mid Sussex	1997	1983	
Caroline Spelman	Meriden	1997	1997	
Sir Michael Spicer	West Worcestershire	1974	1997	
Bob Spink	Castle Point	2001	1992	
Richard Spring	West Suffolk	1997	1992	
Sir John Stanley	Tonbridge and Malling	1974	1974	
Anthony Steen	Totnes	1997	1974	
Gary Streeter	South West Devon	1997	1992	
Graham Stuart	Beverley and Holderness	2005	2005	
Desmond Swayne TD	New Forest West	1997	1997	
Hugo Swire	East Devon	2001	2001	
Robert Syms	Poole	1997	1997	
Sir Peter Tapsell	Louth and Horncastle	1997	1959	
Ian Taylor MBE	Esher and Walton	1997	1987	
Edward Timpson*	Crewe and Nantwich	2008	2008	Elected in 2008 by-election
David Tredinnick	Bosworth	1987	1987	
Andrew Turner	Isle of Wight	2001	2001	
Andrew Tyrie	Chichester	1997	1997	
Edward Vaizey	Wantage	2005	2005	
Shailesh Vara	North West Cambridgeshire	2005	2005	
Sir Paul Viggers	Gosport	1974	1974	
Theresa Villiers	Chipping Barnet	2005	2005	
Charles Walker	Broxbourne	2005	2005	
Ben Wallace	Lancaster and Wyre	2005	2005	
Robert Walter	North Dorset	1997	1997	
Nigel Waterson	Eastbourne	1992	1992	
Angela Watkinson	Upminster	2001	2001	
John Whittingdale OBE	Maldon and East Chelmsford	1997	1992	
Ann Widdecombe	Maidstone and The Weald	1997	1987	
Bill Wiggin	Leominster	2001	2001	
David Willetts	Havant	1992	1992	
David Wilshire	Spelthorne	1987	1987	
Rob Wilson	Reading East	2005	2005	
Lady Ann Winterton	Congleton	1983	1983	
Sir Nicholas Winterton*	Macclesfield	1971	1971	
Jeremy Wright	Rugby and Kenilworth	2005	2005	
Tim Yeo	South Suffolk	1983	1983	
Sir George Young (politician) Bt	North West Hampshire	1997	1974	

== By-elections ==
By-election	Date	Incumbent	Party	Winner	Party	Cause
Bromley and Chislehurst	29 June 2006	Eric Forth	Conservative	Bob Neill	Conservative	Death
Crewe and Nantwich	22 May 2008	Gwyneth Dunwoody	Labour	Edward Timpson	Conservative	Death
Henley	26 June 2008	Boris Johnson	Conservative	John Howell	Conservative	Resignation
Norwich North	30 June 2009	Ian Gibson	Labour	Chloe Smith	Conservative	Resignation

== See also ==
- Results of the 2005 United Kingdom general election
- List of MPs elected in the 2005 United Kingdom general election
- List of United Kingdom Labour MPs 2005-
- List of United Kingdom Labour Co-operative MPs 2005-
- List of United Kingdom Labour and Labour Co-operative MPs 2005-
- List of United Kingdom Liberal Democrat MPs 2005-
- List of MPs for English constituencies 2005-2010
- List of MPs for Scottish constituencies 2005-
- List of MPs for Welsh constituencies 2005-
- List of MPs for Northern Irish constituencies 2005-
- Category:UK MPs 2005-2010
