= List of MPs for constituencies in Wales (2005–2010) =

The following is a list of the forty MPs (members of parliament) who were elected to constituencies of the fifty-fourth parliament of the United Kingdom (UK) within the nation of Wales in 2005 or in subsequent by-elections prior to the dissolution of the 54th Parliament.

(As well as electing MPs to the UK Parliament, Wales has its own National Assembly whose assembly members (AMs) have the power to create secondary legislation.)

== By political affiliation ==
In this version of the list, the MPs are arranged, primarily, in descending alphabetical order of political affiliation, and, secondarily, by rough geographical proximity. Constituency names appear in parentheses following the MPs' common names.

=== Conservatives ===
- David Jones (Clwyd West)
- Stephen Crabb (Preseli Pembrokeshire)
- David Davies (Monmouth)

=== Labour ===
- Albert Owen (Ynys Môn)
- Betty Williams (Conwy)
- Chris Ruane (Vale of Clwyd)
- David Hanson (politician) (Delyn)
- Mark Tami (Alyn and Deeside)
- Ian Lucas (Wrexham)
- Martyn Jones (Clwyd South)
- Nicholas Ainger (Carmarthen West & Pembrokeshire South)
- Nia Griffith (Llanelli)
- Martin Caton (Gower)
- Alan Williams (Swansea West)
- Sian James (Swansea East)
- Peter Hain (Neath)
- Hywel Francis (Aberavon)
- Madeleine Moon (Bridgend)
- Huw Irranca-Davies (Ogmore)
- John Smith (Vale of Glamorgan)
- Chris Bryant (Rhondda)
- Kim Howells (Pontypridd)
- Ann Clwyd (Cynon Valley)
- Dai Havard (Merthyr Tydfil & Rhymney)
- Wayne David (Caerphilly)
- Kevin Brennan (Cardiff West)
- Alun Michael (Cardiff South & Penarth)
- Julie Morgan (Cardiff North)
- Don Touhig (Islwyn)
- Paul Murphy (Torfaen)
- Paul Flynn (Newport West)
- Jessica Morden (Newport East)

=== Liberal Democrats ===
- Lembit Opik (Montgomeryshire)
- Mark Williams (Ceredigion)
- Roger Williams (Brecon & Radnorshire)
- Jenny Willott (Cardiff Central)

=== Plaid Cymru ===
- Hywel Williams (Caernarfon)
- Elfyn Llwyd (Meirionnydd Nant Conwy)
- Adam Price (Carmarthen East & Dinefwr)

=== Independents ===
- Peter Law (Blaenau Gwent), deceased May 2006
- Dai Davies (Blaenau Gwent), elected in a by-election June 2006

== By surname ==
In this version of the list, the Welsh MPs are arranged, primarily, in descending alphabetical order of their surnames, and, secondarily, by descending alphabetical order of their common forenames. Constituency names appear in parentheses following the MPs' names, and political affiliations appear in (square) brackets following that.

| Contents: | A B C D F G H I J L Ll M O P R S T W |

=== A ===
- Nicholas Ainger (Carmarthen West & Pembrokeshire South) [Lab]

=== B ===
- Kevin Brennan (Cardiff West) [Lab]
- Chris Bryant (Rhondda) [Lab]

=== C ===
- Martin Caton (Gower) [Lab]
- Ann Clwyd (Cynon Valley) [Lab]
- Stephen Crabb (Preseli Pembrokeshire) [Con]

=== D ===
- Wayne David (Caerphilly) [Lab]
- Dai Davies (Blaenau Gwent), elected in a by-election June 2006
- David Davies (Monmouth) [Con]

=== F ===
- Paul Flynn (Newport West) [Lab]
- Hywel Francis (Aberavon) [Lab]

=== G ===
- Nia Griffith (Llanelli)

=== H ===
- Peter Hain (Neath) [Lab]
- David Hanson (politician) (Delyn)
- Dai Havard (Merthyr Tydfil & Rhymney) [Lab]
- Kim Howells (Pontypridd)

=== I ===
- Huw Irranca-Davies (Ogmore)

=== J ===
- Sian James (Swansea East)
- David Jones (Clwyd West)
- Martyn Jones (Clwyd South)

=== L ===
- Ian Lucas (Wrexham)
- Peter Law (Blaenau Gwent), deceased May 2006

=== Ll ===
- Elfyn Llwyd (Meirionnydd Nant Conwy)

=== M ===
- Alun Michael (Cardiff South & Penarth) [Lab]
- Madeleine Moon (Bridgend)
- Jessica Morden (Newport East)
- Julie Morgan (Cardiff North) [Lab]
- Paul Murphy (Torfaen)

=== O ===
- Lembit Opik (Montgomeryshire)
- Albert Owen (Ynys Môn)

=== P ===
- Adam Price (Carmarthen East & Dinefwr)

=== R ===
- Chris Ruane (Vale of Clwyd)

=== S ===
- John Smith (Vale of Glamorgan)

=== T ===
- Mark Tami (Alyn and Deeside)
- Don Touhig (Islwyn)

=== W ===
- Alan Williams (Swansea West)
- Betty Williams (Conwy) [Lab]
- Hywel Williams (Caernarfon) [Plaid]
- Mark Williams (Ceredigion)
- Roger Williams (Brecon & Radnorshire)
- Jenny Willott (Cardiff Central)

== See also ==
- List of MPs for Welsh constituencies 2001-2005
- Members of the National Assembly for Wales
- Results of the 2005 United Kingdom general election
- List of MPs elected in the 2005 United Kingdom general election
- List of MPs for English constituencies 2005-2010
- List of MPs for Scottish constituencies 2005-
- List of MPs for Northern Irish constituencies 2005-
- List of United Kingdom Labour MPs 2005-
- List of United Kingdom Labour and Labour Co-operative MPs 2005-
- List of United Kingdom Labour Co-operative MPs 2005-
- List of United Kingdom Conservative MPs 2005-
- List of United Kingdom Liberal Democrat MPs 2005-
- Category:UK MPs 2005-2010
