= List of United Kingdom Labour Co-operative MPs (2005–2010) =

This is a list of Labour Co-operative members of Parliament (MPs) elected to the British House of Commons in the last parliament. The names in italics are the current speaker and deputy speakers and the names with a * next to them are MPs who first entered Parliament in a by-election.

For other Labour Party MPs, see List of United Kingdom Labour MPs 2005-; for a combined list, see List of United Kingdom Labour and Labour Co-operative MPs 2005-.

== MPs ==
Member of Parliament	Constituency	In constituency since	First entered Parliament
Adrian Bailey*	West Bromwich West	2000	2000
Ed Balls	Normanton	2005	2005
Ian Davidson	Glasgow South West	2005	1992
Jim Dobbin	Heywood and Middleton	1997	1997
David Drew	Stroud	1997	1997
Louise Ellman	Liverpool Riverside	1997	1997
Mike Gapes	Ilford South	1992	1992
Linda Gilroy	Plymouth Sutton	1997	1997
Mark Hendrick*	Preston	2000	2000
Meg Hillier	Hackney South and Shoreditch	2005	2005
Phil Hope	Corby	1997	1997
Alan Keen	Feltham and Heston	1992	1992
Mark Lazarowicz	Edinburgh North and Leith	2001	2001
David Lepper	Brighton Pavilion	1997	1997
Andy Love	Edmonton	1997	1997
Thomas McAvoy	Rutherglen and Hamilton West	2005	1987
Sarah McCarthy-Fry	Portsmouth North	2005	2005
John McFall	West Dunbartonshire	2005	1987
Alun Michael	Cardiff South and Penarth	1987	1987
Meg Munn	Sheffield Heeley	2001	2001
Douglas Naysmith	Bristol North West	1997	1997
Ken Purchase	Wolverhampton North East	1992	1992
Andy Reed	Loughborough	1997	1997
Linda Riordan	Halifax	2005	2005
Barry Sheerman	Huddersfield	1983	1979
Angela Smith	Basildon	1997	1997
David Taylor	North West Leicestershire	1997	1997
Gareth Thomas	Harrow West	1997	1997
Don Touhig*	Islwyn	1995	1995

== See also ==
- Results of the 2005 United Kingdom general election
- List of MPs elected in the 2005 United Kingdom general election
- List of United Kingdom Labour MPs 2005-
- List of United Kingdom Labour and Labour Co-operative MPs 2005-
- List of United Kingdom Conservative MPs 2005-
- List of United Kingdom Liberal Democrat MPs 2005-
- List of MPs for Scottish constituencies 2005-
- List of MPs for Northern Irish constituencies 2005-
- List of MPs for Welsh constituencies 2005-
- Category:UK MPs 2005-2010
