= List of United Kingdom Labour and Labour Co-operative MPs (2005–2010) =

This is a list of Labour Party and Labour Co-operative members of Parliament (MPs) elected to the British House of Commons in the 2005 general election. The names in italics are the speaker and deputy speakers and the names with a * next to them are MPs who first entered Parliament in a by-election.

For a list of only Labour Party MPs, see List of United Kingdom Labour MPs 2005-2010; for a list of only Labour Co-operative MPs, see List of United Kingdom Labour Co-operative MPs 2005-2010.

== MPs ==
Member of Parliament	Constituency	In constituency since	First entered Parliament	
Diane Abbott	Hackney North and Stoke Newington	1987	1987	
Nick Ainger	Carmarthen West and South Pembrokeshire	1997	1992	
Bob Ainsworth	Coventry North East	1992	1992	
Douglas Alexander	Paisley and Renfrewshire South	2005	1997	
Graham Allen	Nottingham North	1987	1987	
David Anderson	Blaydon	2005	2005	
Janet Anderson	Rossendale and Darwen	1992	1992	
Hilary Armstrong	North West Durham	1987	1987	
Charlotte Atkins	Staffordshire Moorlands	1997	1997	
Ian Austin	Dudley North	2005	2005	
John Austin	Erith and Thamesmead	1997	1992	
Adrian Bailey*	West Bromwich West	2000	2000	
Vera Baird	Redcar	2001	2001	
Ed Balls	Normanton	2005	2005	
Gordon Banks	Ochil and South Perthshire	2005	2005	
Celia Barlow	Hove	2005	2005	
Kevin Barron	Rother Valley	1983	1983	
John Battle	Leeds West	1987	1987	
Hugh Bayley	York, City of	1992	1992	
Margaret Beckett	Derby South	1983	1974	
Anne Begg	Aberdeen South	1997	1997	
Stuart Bell	Middlesbrough	1983	1983	
Hilary Benn*	Leeds Central	1999	1999	
Joe Benton*	Bootle	1990	1990	
Roger Berry	Kingswood	1992	1992	
Clive Betts	Sheffield Attercliffe	1992	1992	
Liz Blackman	Erewash	1997	1997	
Roberta Blackman-Woods	Durham, City of	2005	2005	
Tony Blair	Sedgefield	1983	1983	Resigned 27 June 2007
Hazel Blears	Salford	1997	1997	
Bob Blizzard	Waveney	1997	1997	
David Blunkett	Sheffield Brightside	1987	1987	
David Borrow	South Ribble	1997	1997	
Ben Bradshaw	Exeter	1997	1997	
Kevin Brennan	Cardiff West	2001	2001	
Gordon Brown	Kirkcaldy and Cowdenbeath	2005	1983	
Lyn Brown	West Ham	2005	2005	
Nick Brown	Newcastle upon Tyne East and Wallsend	1997	1983	
Russell Brown	Dumfries and Galloway	2005	1997	
Des Browne	Kilmarnock and Loudoun	1997	1997	
Chris Bryant	Rhondda	2001	2001	
Karen Buck	Regent's Park and Kensington North	1997	1997	
Richard Burden	Birmingham, Northfield	1992	1992	
Colin Burgon	Elmet	1997	1997	
Andy Burnham	Leigh	2001	2001	
Dawn Butler	Brent South	2005	2005	
Stephen Byers	North Tyneside	1997	1992	
Liam Byrne*	Birmingham, Hodge Hill	2004	2004	
Richard Caborn	Sheffield Central	1983	1983	
David Cairns	Inverclyde	2005	2001	
Alan Campbell	Tynemouth	1997	1997	
Ronnie Campbell	Blyth Valley	1987	1987	
Martin Caton	Gower	1997	1997	
Ian Cawsey	Brigg and Goole	1997	1997	
Colin Challen	Morley and Rothwell	2001	2001	
Ben Chapman	Wirral South	1997	1997	
David Chaytor	Bury North	1997	1997	
Michael Clapham	Barnsley West and Penistone	1992	1992	
Paul Clark	Gillingham	1997	1997	
Katy Clark	North Ayrshire and Arran	2005	2005	
Charles Clarke	Norwich South	1997	1997	
Tom Clarke*	Coatbridge, Chryston and Bellshill	2005	1982	
David Clelland*	Tyne Bridge	1985	1985	
Ann Clwyd*	Cynon Valley	1984	1984	
Vernon Coaker	Gedling	1997	1997	
Ann Coffey	Stockport	1992	1992	
Harry Cohen	Leyton and Wanstead	1997	1983	
Michael Connarty	Linlithgow and East Falkirk	2005	1992	
Frank Cook	Stockton North	1983	1983	
Rosie Cooper	West Lancashire	2005	2005	
Yvette Cooper	Pontefract and Castleford	1997	1997	
Jeremy Corbyn	Islington North	1983	1983	
Jim Cousins	Newcastle upon Tyne Central	1987	1987	
David Crausby	Bolton North East	1997	1997	
Mary Creagh	Wakefield	2005	2005	
Jon Cruddas	Dagenham	2001	2001	
Ann Cryer	Keighley	1997	1997	
John Cummings	Easington	1997	1997	
Jim Cunningham	Coventry South	1997	1992	
Tony Cunningham	Workington	2001	2001	
Claire Curtis-Thomas	Crosby	1997	1997	
Alistair Darling	Edinburgh South West	2005	1987	
Quentin Davies	Grantham and Stamford	1997	1987	Defected from the Conservative Party on 26 June 2007
Wayne David	Caerphilly	2001	2001	
Ian Davidson	Glasgow South West	2005	1992	
Janet Dean	Burton	1997	1997	
John Denham	Southampton Itchen	1992	1992	
Jim Devine*	Livingston	2005	2005	
Parmjit Dhanda	Gloucester	2001	2001	
Andrew Dismore	Hendon	1997	1997	
Jim Dobbin	Heywood and Middleton	1997	1997	
Frank Dobson	Holborn and St Pancras	1983	1983	
Brian Donohoe	Central Ayrshire	2005	1992	
Frank Doran	Aberdeen North	2005	1987	
Jim Dowd	Lewisham West	1992	1992	
David Drew	Stroud	1997	1997	
Gwyneth Dunwoody	Crewe and Nantwich	1983	1966	
Angela Eagle	Wallasey	1992	1992	
Maria Eagle	Liverpool Garston	1997	1997	
Clive Efford	Eltham	1997	1997	
Louise Ellman	Liverpool Riverside	1997	1997	
Natascha Engel	North East Derbyshire	2005	2005	
Jeffrey Ennis*	Barnsley East and Mexborough	1996	1996	
Bill Etherington	Sunderland North	1992	1992	
Paul Farrelly	Newcastle-under-Lyme	2001	2001	
Frank Field	Birkenhead	1979	1979	
Mark Fisher	Stoke-on-Trent Central	1983	1983	
Jim Fitzpatrick	Poplar and Canning Town	1997	1997	
Robert Flello	Stoke-on-Trent South	2005	2005	
Caroline Flint	Don Valley	1997	1997	
Paul Flynn	Newport West	1987	1987	
Barbara Follett	Stevenage	1997	1997	
Michael Foster	Hastings and Rye	1997	1997	
Michael Foster	Worcester	1997	1997	
Hywel Francis	Aberavon	2001	2001	
Mike Gapes	Ilford South	1992	1992	
Barry Gardiner	Brent North	1997	1997	
Bruce George	Walsall South	1974	1974	
Neil Gerrard	Walthamstow	1992	1992	
Ian Gibson	Norwich North	1997	1997	
Linda Gilroy	Plymouth Sutton	1997	1997	
Roger Godsiff	Birmingham, Sparkbrook and Small Heath	1997	1992	
Paul Goggins	Wythenshawe and Sale East	1997	1997	
Helen Goodman	Bishop Auckland	2005	2005	
Nia Griffith	Llanelli	2005	2005	
Nigel Griffiths	Edinburgh South	1987	1987	
John Grogan	Selby	1997	1997	
Andrew Gwynne	Denton and Reddish	2005	2005	
Peter Hain*	Neath	1991	1991	
Mike Hall	Weaver Vale	1997	1997	
Patrick Hall	Bedford	1997	1997	
David Hamilton	Midlothian	2001	2001	
Fabian Hamilton	Leeds North East	1997	1997	
David Hanson	Delyn	1992	1992	
Harriet Harman*	Camberwell and Peckham	1997	1982	
Tom Harris	Glasgow South	2005	2001	
Dai Havard	Merthyr Tydfil and Rhymney	2001	2001	
Sylvia Heal	Halesowen and Rowley Regis	1997	1997	
John Healey	Wentworth	1997	1997	
Doug Henderson	Newcastle upon Tyne North	1987	1987	
Mark Hendrick*	Preston	2000	2000	
Stephen Hepburn	Jarrow	1997	1997	
John Heppell	Nottingham East	1992	1992	
Stephen Hesford	Wirral West	1997	1997	
Patricia Hewitt	Leicester West	1997	1997	
David Heyes	Ashton-under-Lyne	2001	2001	
Keith Hill	Streatham	1992	1992	
Meg Hillier	Hackney South and Shoreditch	2005	2005	
Margaret Hodge*	Barking	1994	1994	
Sharon Hodgson	Gateshead East and Washington West	2005	2005	
Kate Hoey*	Vauxhall	1989	1989	
Jimmy Hood	Lanark and Hamilton East	2005	1987	
Geoff Hoon	Ashfield	1992	1992	
Phil Hope	Corby	1997	1997	
Kelvin Hopkins	Luton North	1997	1997	
George Howarth*	Knowsley North and Sefton East	1997	1986	
Kim Howells*	Pontypridd	1989	1989	
Lindsay Hoyle	Chorley	1997	1997	
Beverley Hughes	Stretford and Urmston	1997	1997	
Joan Humble	Blackpool North and Fleetwood	1997	1997	
John Hutton	Barrow and Furness	1992	1992	
Brian Iddon	Bolton South East	1997	1997	
Eric Illsley	Barnsley Central	1987	1987	
Adam Ingram	East Kilbride, Strathaven and Lesmahagow	1987	1987	
Huw Irranca-Davies*	Ogmore	2002	2002	
Glenda Jackson	Hampstead and Highgate	1992	1992	
Sian James	Swansea East	2005	2005	
Brian Jenkins*	Tamworth	1997	1996	
Alan Johnson	Kingston upon Hull West and Hessle	1997	1997	
Diana Johnson	Kingston upon Hull North	2005	2005	
Helen Jones	Warrington North	1997	1997	
Kevan Jones	North Durham	2001	2001	
Lynne Jones	Birmingham, Selly Oak	1992	1992	
Martyn Jones	Clwyd South	1997	1987	
Tessa Jowell	Dulwich and West Norwood	1997	1992	
Eric Joyce*	Falkirk	2005	2000	
Gerald Kaufman	Manchester Gorton	1983	1970	
Sally Keeble	Northampton North	1997	1997	
Barbara Keeley	Worsley	2005	2005	
Alan Keen	Feltham and Heston	1992	1992	
Ann Keen	Brentford and Isleworth	1997	1997	
Ruth Kelly	Bolton West	1997	1997	
Fraser Kemp	Houghton and Washington East	1997	1997	
Jane Kennedy	Liverpool Wavertree	1997	1992	
Piara Khabra	Ealing Southall	1992	1992	died 19 Jun 2007
Sadiq Khan	Tooting	2005	2005	
David Kidney	Stafford	1997	1997	
Peter Kilfoyle*	Liverpool Walton	1991	1991	
Jim Knight	South Dorset	2001	2001	
Ashok Kumar	Middlesbrough South and East Cleveland	1997	1991	
Stephen Ladyman	South Thanet	1997	1997	
David Lammy*	Tottenham	2000	2000	
Robert Laxton	Derby North	1997	1997	
Mark Lazarowicz	Edinburgh North and Leith	2001	2001	
David Lepper	Brighton Pavilion	1997	1997	
Tom Levitt	High Peak	1997	1997	
Ivan Lewis	Bury South	1997	1997	
Andy Love	Edmonton	1997	1997	
Martin Linton	Battersea	1997	1997	
Tony Lloyd	Manchester Central	1997	1983	
Ian Lucas	Wrexham	2001	2001	
John MacDougall	Glenrothes	2005	2001	
Andrew MacKinlay	Thurrock	1992	1992	
Denis MacShane*	Rotherham	1994	1994	
Fiona Mactaggart	Slough	1997	1997	
Khalid Mahmood	Birmingham, Perry Barr	2001	2001	
Shahid Malik	Dewsbury	2005	2005	
Judy Mallaber	Amber Valley	1997	1997	
John Mann	Bassetlaw	2001	2001	
Rob Marris	Wolverhampton South West	2001	2001	
Michael Martin (Speaker)	Glasgow North East	2005	1979	
Gordon Marsden	Blackpool South	1997	1997	
David Marshall	Glasgow East	2005	1979	
Bob Marshall-Andrews	Medway	1997	1997	
Eric Martlew	Carlisle	1987	1987	
Thomas McAvoy	Rutherglen and Hamilton West	2005	1987	
Stephen McCabe	Birmingham, Hall Green	1997	1997	
Christine McCafferty	Calder Valley	1997	1997	
Kerry McCarthy	Bristol East	2005	2005	
Sarah McCarthy-Fry	Portsmouth North	2005	2005	
Ian McCartney	Makerfield	1987	1987	
Siobhain McDonagh	Mitcham and Morden	1997	1997	
John McDonnell	Hayes and Harlington	1997	1997	
Pat McFadden	Wolverhampton South East	2005	2005	
John McFall	West Dunbartonshire	2005	1987	
James McGovern	Dundee West	2005	2005	
Anne McGuire	Stirling	1997	1997	
Shona McIsaac	Cleethorpes	1997	1997	
Ann McKechin	Glasgow North	2005	2001	
Rosemary McKenna	Cumbernauld, Kilsyth and Kirkintilloch East	2005	1997	
Tony McNulty	Harrow East	1997	1997	
Michael Meacher	Oldham West and Royton	1997	1970	
Alan Meale	Mansfield	1987	1987	
Gillian Merron	Lincoln	1997	1997	
Alun Michael	Cardiff South and Penarth	1987	1987	
Alan Milburn	Darlington	1992	1992	
David Miliband	South Shields	2001	2001	
Ed Miliband	Doncaster North	2005	2005	
Andrew Miller	Ellesmere Port and Neston	1992	1992	
Austin Mitchell*	Great Grimsby	1977	1977	
Anne Moffat	East Lothian	2001	2001	
Laura Moffatt	Crawley	1997	1997	
Chris Mole	Ipswich	2001	2001	
Madeleine Moon	Bridgend	2005	2005	
Margaret Moran	Luton South	1997	1997	
Jessica Morden	Newport East	2005	2005	
Julie Morgan	Cardiff North	1997	1997	
Elliot Morley	Scunthorpe	1997	1987	
Kali Mountford	Colne Valley	1997	1997	
George Mudie	Leeds East	1992	1992	
Chris Mullin	Sunderland South	1987	1987	
Meg Munn	Sheffield Heeley	2001	2001	
Jim Murphy	East Renfrewshire	2005	1997	
Denis Murphy	Wansbeck	1997	1997	
Paul Murphy	Torfaen	1987	1987	
Douglas Naysmith	Bristol North West	1997	1997	
Dan Norris	Wansdyke	1997	1997	
Mike O'Brien	North Warwickshire	1992	1992	
Edward O'Hara*	Knowsley South	1990	1990	
Bill Olner	Nuneaton	1992	1992	
Sandra Osborne	Ayr, Carrick and Cumnock	2005	1997	
Albert Owen	Ynys Môn	2001	2001	
Nick Palmer	Broxtowe	1997	1997	
Ian Pearson*	Dudley South	1997	1994	
James Plaskitt	Warwick and Leamington	1997	1997	
Greg Pope	Hyndburn	1992	1992	
Stephen Pound	Ealing North	1997	1997	
Bridget Prentice	Lewisham East	1992	1992	
Gordon Prentice	Pendle	1992	1992	
John Prescott	Kingston upon Hull East	1970	1970	
Dawn Primarolo	Bristol South	1987	1987	
Gwyn Prosser	Dover	1997	1997	
Ken Purchase	Wolverhampton North East	1992	1992	
James Purnell	Stalybridge and Hyde	2001	2001	
Bill Rammell	Harlow	1997	1997	
Nick Raynsford*	Greenwich and Woolwich	1997	1986	
Andy Reed	Loughborough	1997	1997	
Jamie Reed	Copeland	2005	2005	
John Reid	Airdrie and Shotts	2005	1987	
Linda Riordan	Halifax	2005	2005	
John Robertson*	Glasgow North West	2005	2000	
Geoffrey Robinson*	Coventry North West	1976	1976	
Terry Rooney*	Bradford North	1990	1990	
Frank Roy	Motherwell and Wishaw	1997	1997	
Chris Ruane	Vale of Clwyd	1997	1997	
Joan Ruddock	Lewisham Deptford	1987	1987	
Christine Russell	Chester, City of	1997	1997	
Joan Ryan	Enfield North	1997	1997	
Martin Salter	Reading West	1997	1997	
Mohammad Sarwar	Glasgow Central	2005	1997	
Alison Seabeck	Plymouth Devonport	2005	2005	
Jonathan Shaw	Chatham and Aylesford	1997	1997	
Barry Sheerman	Huddersfield	1983	1979	
James Sheridan	Paisley and Renfrewshire North	2005	2001	
Clare Short	Birmingham Ladywood	1983	1983	
Siôn Simon	Birmingham, Erdington	2001	2001	
Alan Simpson	Nottingham South	1992	1992	
Marsha Singh	Bradford West	1997	1997	
Dennis Skinner	Bolsover	1970	1970	
Andy Slaughter	Ealing, Acton and Shepherd's Bush	2005	2005	
Andrew Smith	Oxford East	1987	1987	
Angela Smith	Basildon	1997	1997	
Angela Smith	Sheffield Hillsborough	2005	2005	
Geraldine Smith	Morecambe and Lunesdale	1997	1997	
Jacqui Smith	Redditch	1997	1997	
John Smith*	Vale of Glamorgan	1997	1989	
Anne Snelgrove	Swindon South	2005	2005	
Peter Soulsby	Leicester South	2005	2005	
Helen Southworth	Warrington South	1997	1997	
John Spellar*	Warley	1982	1997	
Phyllis Starkey	Milton Keynes South West	1997	1997	
Ian Stewart	Eccles	1997	1997	
Howard Stoate	Dartford	1997	1997	
Gavin Strang	Edinburgh East	2005	1970	
Jack Straw	Blackburn	1979	1979	
Graham Stringer	Manchester Blackley	1997	1997	
Gisela Stuart	Birmingham, Edgbaston	1997	1997	
Gerry Sutcliffe*	Bradford South	1994	1994	
Mark Tami	Alyn and Deeside	2001	2001	
Dari Taylor	Stockton South	1997	1997	
David Taylor	North West Leicestershire	1997	1997	
Gareth Thomas	Harrow West	1997	1997	
Emily Thornberry	Islington South and Finsbury	2005	2005	
Stephen Timms*	East Ham	1997	1994	
Paddy Tipping	Sherwood	1992	1992	
Mark Todd	South Derbyshire	1997	1997	
Don Touhig*	Islwyn	1995	1995	
Jon Trickett*	Hemsworth	1996	1996	
Paul Truswell	Pudsey	1997	1997	
Desmond Turner	Brighton Kemptown	1997	1997	
Neil Turner*	Wigan	1999	1999	
Derek Twigg	Halton	1997	1997	
Kitty Ussher	Burnley	2005	2005	
Keith Vaz	Leicester East	1987	1987	
Rudi Vis	Finchley and Golders Green	1997	1997	
Joan Walley	Stoke-on-Trent North	1987	1987	
Lynda Waltho	Stourbridge	2005	2005	
Claire Ward	Watford	1997	1997	
Robert Wareing	Liverpool West Derby	1983	1983	
Tom Watson	West Bromwich East	2001	2001	
David Watts	St Helens North	1997	1997	
Alan Whitehead	Southampton Test	1997	1997	
Malcolm Wicks	Croydon North	1997	1992	
Alan Williams	Swansea West	2005	1964	
Betty Williams	Conwy	1997	1997	
Michael Wills	Swindon North	1997	1997	
David Winnick	Walsall North	1979	1966	
Rosie Winterton	Doncaster Central	1997	1997	
Mike Wood	Batley and Spen	1997	1997	
Shaun Woodward	St Helens South	2001	1997	
Phil Woolas	Oldham East and Saddleworth	1997	1997	
Tony Wright	Cannock Chase	1997	1992	
Tony Wright	Great Yarmouth	1997	1997	
Iain Wright*	Hartlepool	2004	2004	
David Wright	Telford	2001	2001	
Derek Wyatt	Sittingbourne and Sheppey	1997	1997	

== See also ==
- Results of the 2005 United Kingdom general election
- List of MPs elected in the 2005 United Kingdom general election
- List of United Kingdom Labour MPs (2005–2010)
- List of United Kingdom Labour Co-operative MPs (2005–2010)
- List of United Kingdom Conservative MPs (2005–2010)
- List of United Kingdom Liberal Democrat MPs (2005–2010)
- List of MPs for constituencies in Northern Ireland (2005–2010)
- List of MPs for constituencies in Scotland (2005–2010)
- List of MPs for constituencies in Wales (2005–2010)
