= List of United Kingdom Liberal Democrat MPs (2005–2010) =

This is a list of Liberal Democrat members of Parliament (MPs) elected to the British House of Commons for the 54th Parliament of the United Kingdom. This includes 62 MPs elected at the 2005 general election and those subsequently elected in by-elections 1, total 63 Liberal Democrat MPs.

The names in italics are those who did not serve throughout this Parliament, and the names with a * next to them are MPs who first entered Parliament in a by-election.

== MPs ==
Member of Parliament	Constituency	In constituency since	First elected	
Danny Alexander	Inverness, Nairn, Badenoch and Strathspey	2005	2005	
Norman Baker	Lewes	1997	1997	
John Barrett	Edinburgh West	2001	2001	
Alan Beith*	Berwick-upon-Tweed	1973	1973	
Tom Brake	Carshalton and Wallington	1997	1997	
Colin Breed	South East Cornwall	1997	1997	
Annette Brooke	Mid Dorset and North Poole	2001	2001	
Jeremy Browne	Taunton	2005	2005	
Malcolm Bruce	Gordon	1983	1983	
Paul Burstow	Sutton and Cheam	1997	1997	
Lorely Burt	Solihull	2005	2005	
Vincent Cable	Twickenham	1997	1997	
Sir Menzies Campbell	Fife North East	1987	1987	
Alistair Carmichael	Orkney and Shetland	2001	2001	
Nick Clegg	Sheffield Hallam	2005	2005	
Edward Davey	Kingston and Surbiton	1997	1997	
Tim Farron	Westmorland and Lonsdale	2005	2005	
Lynne Featherstone	Hornsey and Wood Green	2005	2005	
Don Foster	Bath	1992	1992	
Andrew George	St Ives	1997	1997	
Sandra Gidley*	Romsey	2000	2000	
Julia Goldsworthy	Falmouth and Camborne	2005	2005	
Mike Hancock	Portsmouth South	1997	1983	
Evan Harris	Oxford West and Abingdon	1997	1997	
Nick Harvey	North Devon	1992	1992	
David Heath	Somerton and Frome	1997	1997	
John Hemming	Birmingham, Yardley	2005	2005	
Paul Holmes	Chesterfield	2001	2001	
Martin Horwood	Cheltenham	2005	2005	
David Howarth	Cambridge	2005	2005	
Simon Hughes*	North Southwark and Bermondsey	1997	1983	
Chris Huhne	Eastleigh	2005	2005	
Mark Hunter	Cheadle	2005	2005	
Paul Keetch	Hereford	1997	1997	
Charles Kennedy	Ross, Skye and Lochaber	2005	1983	
Susan Kramer	Richmond Park	2005	2005	
Norman Lamb	North Norfolk	2001	2001	
David Laws	Yeovil	2001	2001	
John Leech	Manchester Withington	2005	2005	
Michael Moore	Berwickshire, Roxburgh and Selkirk	2005	1997	
Greg Mulholland	Leeds North West	2005	2005	
Mark Oaten	Winchester	1997	1997	
Lembit Öpik	Montgomeryshire	1997	1997	
John Pugh	Southport	2001	2001	
Alan Reid	Argyll and Bute	2001	2001	
Willie Rennie*	Dunfermline and West Fife	2006	2006	Elected in 2006 by-election
Sir Robert Smith, Bt.	West Aberdeenshire and Kincardine	1997	1997	
Dan Rogerson	North Cornwall	2005	2005	
Paul Rowen	Rochdale	2005	2005	
Bob Russell	Colchester	1997	1997	
Adrian Sanders	Torbay	1997	1997	
Andrew Stunell	Hazel Grove	1997	1997	
Jo Swinson	East Dunbartonshire	2005	2005	
Matthew Taylor	Truro and St Austell	1987	1987	
Sarah Teather*	Brent East	2003	2003	
John Thurso	Caithness, Sutherland and Easter Ross	2001	2001	
Steve Webb	Northavon	1997	1997	
Mark Williams	Ceredigion	2005	2005	
Roger Williams	Brecon and Radnorshire	2001	2001	
Stephen Williams	Bristol West	2005	2005	
Phil Willis	Harrogate and Knaresborough	1997	1997	
Jenny Willott	Cardiff Central	2005	2005	
Richard Younger-Ross	Teignbridge	2001	2001	

== By-elections ==
By-election	Date	Incumbent	Party	Winner	Party	Cause
Dunfermline and West Fife	9 February 2006	Rachel Squire	Labour	Willie Rennie	Liberal Democrats	Death (cancer/stroke)

== See also ==
- Results of the 2005 United Kingdom general election
- List of MPs elected in the 2005 United Kingdom general election
- List of United Kingdom Conservative MPs 2005-
- List of United Kingdom Labour MPs 2005-
- List of United Kingdom Labour Co-operative MPs 2005-
- List of United Kingdom Labour and Labour Co-operative MPs 2005-
- List of MPs for English constituencies 2005-2010
- List of MPs for Scottish constituencies 2005-
- List of MPs for Welsh constituencies 2005-
- List of MPs for Northern Irish constituencies 2005-
- Category:UK MPs 2005-2010
