= Results of the 2005 United Kingdom general election =

== Results by parliamentary constituency ==
The results of the 2005 United Kingdom general election, by parliamentary constituency were as follows:

Constituency	Cnty	Rgn	Last elctn	Winning party				Turnout (Note: Excludes spoilt ballots)	Votes													
Constituency	Cnty	Rgn	Last elctn	Party	Votes	Share	Majrty	Turnout	Lab (Note: Excludes Speaker) (Note: Includes Labour Party and allied Co-operative Party)	Con	LD	UKIP	SNP	Grn (Note: Includes Green Party of England and Wales, Scottish Green Party and Green Party in Northern Ireland)	DUP	BNP	PC	SF	UUP	SDLP	Other (Note: Includes all other parties, all independent candidates and the Speaker)	Total
Aberavon	WGM	WLS	Lab	Lab	18,077	60.0%	13,937	59.4%	18,077	3,064	4,140			510			3,545				768	30,104
Aberdeen North	SCT	SCT	Lab (Note: The boundaries for this seat were adjusted as part of the Fifth Periodic Review of Westminster constituencies, which took effect for Scotland at the 2005 General Election)	Lab	15,557	42.5%	6,795	55.7%	15,557	3,456	8,762		8,168								691	36,634
Aberdeen South	SCT	SCT	Lab	Lab	15,272	36.7%	1,348	62.1%	15,272	7,134	13,924		4,120	768							403	41,621
Airdrie and Shotts	SCT	SCT	Lab	Lab	19,568	59.0%	14,084	53.5%	19,568	3,271	3,792		5,484								1,043	33,158
Aldershot	HAM	SE	Con	Con	20,572	42.7%	5,334	61.3%	9,895	20,572	15,238	1,182									1,254	48,141
Aldridge-Brownhills	WMD	WM	Con	Con	18,744	47.4%	5,507	64.0%	13,237	18,744	4,862	1,093				1,620						39,556
Altrincham and Sale West	GTM	NW	Con	Con	20,569	46.4%	7,159	65.9%	13,410	20,569	9,595	736										44,310
Alyn and Deeside	CON	WLS	Lab	Lab	17,331	48.8%	8,378	59.7%	17,331	8,953	6,174	918					1,320				800	35,496
Amber Valley	DBY	EM	Lab	Lab	21,593	45.6%	5,275	62.9%	21,593	16,318	6,225	788				1,243					1,224	47,391
Angus	SCT	SCT	SNP	SNP	12,840	33.7%	1,601	60.5%	6,850	11,239	6,660		12,840								556	38,145
Argyll and Bute	SCT	SCT	LD	LD	15,786	36.5%	5,636	64.2%	9,696	10,150	15,786		6,716								881	43,229
Arundel and South Downs	WSX	SE	Con	Con	24,752	49.8%	11,309	68.5%	8,482	24,752	13,443	2,700									313	49,690
Ashfield	NTT	EM	Lab	Lab	20,433	48.6%	10,213	57.3%	20,433	10,220	5,829										5,569	42,051
Ashford	KEN	SE	Con	Con	26,651	51.6%	13,298	65.0%	13,353	26,651	8,308	1,620		1,753								51,685
Ashton-under-Lyne	GTM	NW	Lab	Lab	21,211	57.4%	13,952	51.3%	21,211	7,259	5,108	768				2,051					570	36,967
Aylesbury	BKM	SE	Con	Con	25,252	49.1%	11,065	62.4%	9,540	25,252	14,187	2,479										51,458
Ayr, Carrick and Cumnock	SCT	SCT	New (Note: There was not previously a seat with this name – it was created as part of the Fifth Periodic Review of Westminster constituencies, which took effect for Scotland at the 2005 General Election)	Lab	20,433	45.4%	9,997	61.3%	20,433	10,436	6,341	365	5,932								1,541	45,048
Banbury	OXF	SE	Con	Con	26,382	46.9%	10,797	64.5%	15,585	26,382	10,076	1,241		1,590							1,335	56,209
Banff and Buchan	SCT	SCT	SNP	SNP	19,044	51.2%	11,837	56.6%	4,476	7,207	4,952	442	19,044								1,095	37,216
Barking	LND	LND	Lab	Lab	13,826	45.2%	8,883	53.1%	13,826	4,943	4,917	803		618		4,916					589	30,612
Barnsley Central	SYK	YTH	Lab	Lab	17,478	61.1%	12,732	47.2%	17,478	3,813	4,746					1,403					1,175	28,615
Barnsley East and Mexborough	SYK	YTH	Lab	Lab	20,779	62.9%	14,125	49.3%	20,779	4,853	6,654										740	33,026
Barnsley West and Penistone	SYK	YTH	Lab	Lab	20,372	55.3%	11,314	55.0%	20,372	9,058	7,422											36,852
Barrow and Furness	CMA	NW	Lab	Lab	17,360	47.6%	6,037	59.0%	17,360	11,323	6,130	758									922	36,493
Basildon	ESS	E	Lab	Lab	18,720	43.4%	3,142	58.4%	18,720	15,578	4,473	1,143		662		2,055					510	43,141
Basingstoke	HAM	SE	Con	Con	19,955	41.5%	4,680	63.0%	15,275	19,955	9,952	1,044		928		821					148	48,123
Bassetlaw	NTT	EM	Lab	Lab	22,847	56.6%	10,837	58.1%	22,847	12,010	5,485											40,342
Bath	AVN	SW	LD	LD	20,101	43.9%	4,638	68.6%	6,773	15,463	20,101	770		2,494							235	45,836
Batley and Spen	WYK	YTH	Lab	Lab	17,974	45.8%	5,788	62.3%	17,974	12,186	5,731			649		2,668						39,208
Battersea	LND	LND	Lab	Lab	16,569	40.4%	163	59.0%	16,569	16,406	6,006	333		1,735								41,049
Beaconsfield	BKM	SE	Con	Con	24,126	55.4%	15,253	63.9%	8,422	24,126	8,873	2,102										43,523
Beckenham	LND	LND	Con	Con	22,183	45.3%	8,401	65.5%	13,782	22,183	10,862	1,301									836	48,964
Bedford	BDF	E	Lab	Lab	17,557	41.7%	3,383	59.6%	17,557	14,174	9,063	995									283	42,072
Belfast East	NIR	NIR	DUP	DUP	15,152	49.1%	5,877	58.3%		434					15,152			1,029	9,275	844	4,097	30,831
Belfast North	NIR	NIR	DUP	DUP	13,935	45.6%	5,188	58.1%							13,935			8,747	2,154	4,950	754	30,540
Belfast South	NIR	NIR	UUP	SDLP	10,339	32.3%	1,235	61.3%							9,104			2,882	7,263	10,339	2,440	32,028
Belfast West	NIR	NIR	SF	SF	24,348	70.5%	19,315	64.5%							3,652			24,348	779	5,033	733	34,545
Berwick-upon-Tweed	NBL	NE	LD	LD	19,052	52.8%	8,632	63.4%	6,618	10,420	19,052											36,090
Berwickshire, Roxburgh and Selkirk	SCT	SCT	New	LD	18,993	41.8%	5,901	63.3%	7,206	13,092	18,993	601	3,885								1,611	45,388
Bethnal Green and Bow	LND	LND	Lab	Resp	15,801	35.9%	823	53.3%	14,978	6,244	4,928			1,950							15,907	44,007
Beverley and Holderness	HUM	YTH	Con	Con	20,435	40.7%	2,581	65.3%	17,854	20,435	9,578	2,336										50,203
Bexhill and Battle	SXE	SE	Con	Con	24,629	52.6%	13,449	67.2%	8,457	24,629	11,180	2,568										46,834
Bexleyheath and Crayford	LND	LND	Lab	Con	19,722	46.3%	4,551	65.5%	15,171	19,722	5,144	1,302				1,245						42,584
Billericay	ESS	E	Con	Con	25,487	52.2%	11,206	61.4%	14,281	25,487	6,471	1,184				1,435						48,858
Birkenhead	MSY	NW	Lab	Lab	18,059	65.0%	12,934	48.7%	18,059	4,602	5,125											27,786
Birmingham Edgbaston	WMD	WM	Lab	Lab	16,465	43.8%	2,349	58.0%	16,465	14,116	5,185	749		1,116								37,631
Birmingham Erdington	WMD	WM	Lab	Lab	16,810	53.0%	9,575	48.9%	16,810	7,235	5,027	746				1,512					416	31,746
Birmingham Hall Green	WMD	WM	Lab	Lab	16,304	47.2%	5,714	60.4%	16,304	10,590	6,682	960										34,536
Birmingham Hodge Hill	WMD	WM	Lab (Note: 2004 Birmingham Hodge Hill by-election)	Lab	13,822	48.6%	5,449	52.7%	13,822	3,768	8,373	680				1,445					329	28,417
Birmingham Ladywood	WMD	WM	Lab	Lab	17,262	51.9%	6,801	46.8%	17,262	3,515	10,461	2,008										33,246
Birmingham Northfield	WMD	WM	Lab	Lab	15,419	49.6%	6,454	56.6%	15,419	8,965	4,171	641				1,278					582	31,056
Birmingham Perry Barr	WMD	WM	Lab	Lab	18,269	47.0%	7,948	55.5%	18,269	6,513	10,321	745									3,063	38,911
Birmingham Selly Oak	WMD	WM	Lab	Lab	19,226	46.1%	8,851	59.5%	19,226	10,375	9,591	967		1,581								41,740
Birmingham Sparkbrook and Small Heath	WMD	WM	Lab	Lab	13,787	36.1%	3,289	51.8%	13,787	3,480	7,727	1,342		855							11,001	38,192
Birmingham Yardley	WMD	WM	Lab	LD	13,648	46.4%	2,672	57.7%	10,976	2,970	13,648	314				1,523						29,431
Bishop Auckland	DUR	NE	Lab	Lab	19,065	50.0%	10,047	56.5%	19,065	8,736	9,018	1,309										38,128
Blaby	LEI	EM	Con	Con	22,487	45.5%	7,873	65.5%	14,614	22,487	9,382	1,201				1,704						49,388
Blackburn	LAN	NW	Lab	Lab	17,562	42.0%	8,009	56.9%	17,562	9,553	8,608	954		783		2,263					2,082	41,805
Blackpool North and Fleetwood	LAN	NW	Lab	Lab	20,620	47.6%	5,062	57.7%	20,620	15,558	5,533	1,579										43,290
Blackpool South	LAN	NW	Lab	Lab	19,375	50.5%	7,922	52.1%	19,375	11,453	5,552	849				1,113						38,342
Blaenau Gwent	GNT	WLS	Lab	Ind	20,505	58.2%	9,121	66.1%	11,384	816	1,511	192					843				20,505	35,251
Blaydon	TWR	NE	Lab	Lab	20,120	51.5%	5,335	62.6%	20,120	3,129	14,785	1,019										39,053
Blyth Valley	NBL	NE	Lab	Lab	19,659	55.0%	8,527	56.2%	19,659	4,982	11,132											35,773
Bognor Regis and Littlehampton	WSX	SE	Con	Con	18,183	44.6%	7,822	62.1%	10,361	18,183	8,927	3,276										40,747
Bolsover	DBY	EM	Lab	Lab	25,217	65.2%	18,437	57.3%	25,217	6,702	6,780											38,699
Bolton North East	GTM	NW	Lab	Lab	16,874	45.7%	4,103	54.8%	16,874	12,771	6,044	640									582	36,911
Bolton South East	GTM	NW	Lab	Lab	18,129	56.9%	11,638	50.0%	18,129	6,491	6,047	840									343	31,850
Bolton West	GTM	NW	Lab	Lab	17,239	42.5%	2,064	63.5%	17,239	15,175	7,241	524									364	40,543
Bootle	MSY	NW	Lab	Lab	19,345	75.5%	16,357	47.7%	19,345	1,580	2,988	1,054									655	25,622
Boston and Skegness	LIN	EM	Con	Con	19,329	46.2%	5,907	58.8%	13,422	19,329	3,649	4,024		420		1,025						41,869
Bosworth	LEI	EM	Con	Con	20,212	42.6%	5,319	66.3%	14,893	20,212	10,528	1,866										47,499
Bournemouth East	DOR	SW	Con	Con	16,925	45.0%	5,244	59.3%	7,191	16,925	11,681	1,802										37,599
Bournemouth West	DOR	SW	Con	Con	14,057	41.4%	4,031	53.3%	7,824	14,057	10,026	2,017										33,924
Bracknell	BRK	SE	Con	Con	25,412	49.7%	12,036	63.4%	13,376	25,412	10,128	1,818									407	51,141
Bradford North	WYK	YTH	Lab	Lab	14,622	42.5%	3,511	53.3%	14,622	5,569	11,111			560		2,061					474	34,397
Bradford South	WYK	YTH	Lab	Lab	17,954	49.0%	9,167	54.2%	17,954	8,787	5,334	552		695		2,862					421	36,605
Bradford West	WYK	YTH	Lab	Lab	14,570	40.1%	3,026	54.0%	14,570	11,544	6,620			1,110		2,525						36,369
Braintree	ESS	E	Lab	Con	23,597	44.5%	3,893	65.9%	19,704	23,597	7,037	1,181		1,308							228	53,055
Brecon and Radnorshire	POW	WLS	LD	LD	17,182	44.8%	3,905	69.5%	5,755	13,277	17,182	723					1,404					38,341
Brent East	LND	LND	LD (Note: 2003 Brent East by-election)	LD	14,764	47.5%	2,712	55.3%	12,052	3,193	14,764			905							154	31,068
Brent North	LND	LND	Lab	Lab	17,420	48.8%	5,641	59.3%	17,420	11,779	5,672										811	35,682
Brent South	LND	LND	Lab	Lab	17,501	58.8%	11,326	52.7%	17,501	4,485	6,175			957							646	29,764
Brentford and Isleworth	LND	LND	Lab	Lab	18,329	39.8%	4,411	52.2%	18,329	13,918	10,477			1,652							1,641	46,017
Brentwood and Ongar	ESS	E	Con	Con	23,609	53.5%	11,612	68.4%	6,579	23,609	11,997	1,805									155	44,145
Bridgend	MGM	WLS	Lab	Lab	16,410	43.3%	6,523	59.2%	16,410	9,887	7,949	491		595			2,527					37,859
Bridgwater	SOM	SW	Con	Con	21,240	44.1%	8,469	63.5%	12,771	21,240	10,940	1,767		1,391								48,109
Brigg and Goole	HUM	YTH	Lab	Lab	19,257	45.2%	2,894	63.2%	19,257	16,363	5,690	1,268										42,578
Brighton Kemptown	SXE	SE	Lab	Lab	15,858	39.9%	2,737	60.2%	15,858	13,121	6,560	758		2,800							622	39,719
Brighton Pavilion	SXE	SE	Lab	Lab	15,427	35.4%	5,030	63.9%	15,427	10,397	7,171	508		9,530							506	43,539
Bristol East	AVN	SW	Lab	Lab	19,152	45.9%	8,621	61.3%	19,152	8,787	10,531	1,132		1,586							532	41,720
Bristol North West	AVN	SW	Lab	Lab	22,192	46.7%	8,962	61.1%	22,192	13,230	9,545	1,132									1,393	47,492
Bristol South	AVN	SW	Lab	Lab	20,778	49.1%	11,142	59.8%	20,778	8,466	9,636	1,321		2,127								42,328
Bristol West	AVN	SW	Lab	LD	21,987	38.3%	5,128	70.5%	16,859	15,429	21,987	439		2,163							519	57,396
Bromley and Chislehurst	LND	LND	Con	Con	23,583	51.1%	13,342	64.9%	10,241	23,583	9,368	1,475		1,470								46,137
Bromsgrove	HWR	WM	Con	Con	24,387	51.0%	10,080	67.6%	14,307	24,387	7,197	1,919										47,810
Broxbourne	HRT	E	Con	Con	21,878	53.8%	11,509	59.7%	10,369	21,878	4,973	1,479				1,929						40,628
Broxtowe	NTT	EM	Lab	Lab	20,457	41.9%	2,296	68.6%	20,457	18,161	7,837	695		896							760	48,806
Buckingham	BKM	SE	Con	Con	27,748	57.4%	18,129	68.7%	9,619	27,748	9,508	1,432										48,307
Burnley	LAN	NW	Lab	Lab	14,999	38.5%	5,778	59.2%	14,999	4,206	9,221	376				4,003					6,178	38,983
Burton	STS	WM	Lab	Lab	19,701	41.1%	1,421	61.0%	19,701	18,280	6,236	913				1,840					912	47,882
Bury North	GTM	NW	Lab	Lab	19,130	43.0%	2,926	61.5%	19,130	16,204	6,514	476				1,790					325	44,439
Bury South	GTM	NW	Lab	Lab	19,741	50.4%	8,912	58.5%	19,741	10,829	6,968	1,059									557	39,154
Bury St Edmunds	SFK	E	Con	Con	24,332	46.2%	9,930	66.1%	14,402	24,332	10,423	1,859		1,603								52,619
Caernarfon	GWN	WLS	PC	PC	12,747	45.5%	5,209	60.4%	7,538	3,483	3,508	723					12,747					27,999
Caerphilly	GNT	WLS	Lab	Lab	22,190	56.6%	15,359	59.3%	22,190	5,711	3,861						6,831				636	39,229
Caithness, Sutherland and Easter Ross	SCT	SCT	LD	LD	13,957	50.5%	8,168	59.1%	5,789	2,835	13,957		3,686								1,396	27,663
Calder Valley	WYK	YTH	Lab	Lab	18,426	38.6%	1,367	67.0%	18,426	17,059	9,027			1,371		1,887						47,770
Camberwell and Peckham	LND	LND	Lab	Lab	18,933	65.3%	13,483	50.8%	18,933	2,841	5,450	350		1,172							245	28,991
Cambridge	CAM	E	Lab	LD	19,152	44.0%	4,339	62.1%	14,813	7,193	19,152	569		1,245							597	43,569
Cannock Chase	STS	WM	Lab	Lab	22,139	51.3%	9,227	57.4%	22,139	12,912	5,934	2,170										43,155
Canterbury	KEN	SE	Con	Con	21,113	44.4%	7,471	66.1%	13,642	21,113	10,059	926		1,521							326	47,587
Cardiff Central	SGM	WLS	Lab	LD	17,991	49.8%	5,593	59.2%	12,398	3,339	17,991	383					1,271				750	36,132
Cardiff North	SGM	WLS	Lab	Lab	17,707	39.0%	1,146	70.4%	17,707	16,561	8,483	534					1,936				139	45,360
Cardiff South and Penarth	SGM	WLS	Lab	Lab	17,447	47.3%	9,237	56.1%	17,447	8,210	7,529	522		729			2,023				452	36,912
Cardiff West	SGM	WLS	Lab	Lab	15,729	45.5%	8,167	57.7%	15,729	7,562		727					4,316				6,227	34,561
Carlisle	CMA	NW	Lab	Lab	17,019	48.1%	5,695	59.5%	17,019	11,324	5,916	792									343	35,394
Carmarthen East and Dinefwr	DFD	WLS	PC	PC	17,561	45.9%	6,718	71.6%	10,843	5,235	3,719	661					17,561				272	38,291
Carmarthen West and South Pembrokeshire	DFD	WLS	Lab	Lab	13,953	36.9%	1,910	67.3%	13,953	12,043	5,399	545					5,582				341	37,863
Carshalton and Wallington	LND	LND	LD	LD	17,357	40.3%	1,068	64.0%	7,396	16,289	17,357	1,111		908								43,061
Castle Point	ESS	E	Con	Con	22,118	48.3%	8,201	65.9%	13,917	22,118	4,719	3,431		1,617								45,802
Central Ayrshire	SCT	SCT	New	Lab	19,905	46.4%	10,423	62.5%	19,905	9,482	6,881	346	4,969								1,288	42,871
Central Suffolk and North Ipswich	SFK	E	Con	Con	22,333	43.9%	7,856	66.7%	14,477	22,333	10,709	1,754		1,593								50,866
Ceredigion	DFD	WLS	PC	LD	13,130	36.5%	219	66.8%	4,337	4,455	13,130			846			12,911				268	35,947
Charnwood	LEI	EM	Con	Con	23,571	46.6%	8,809	66.4%	14,762	23,571	9,057	1,489				1,737						50,616
Chatham and Aylesford	KEN	SE	Lab	Lab	18,387	43.7%	2,332	59.7%	18,387	16,055	5,744	1,226									668	42,080
Cheadle	GTM	NW	LD	LD	23,189	48.9%	4,020	69.6%	4,169	19,169	23,189	489				421						47,437
Cheltenham	GLS	SW	LD	LD	18,122	41.5%	2,303	61.0%	4,988	15,819	18,122	608		908							3,176	43,621
Chesham and Amersham	BKM	SE	Con	Con	25,619	54.4%	13,798	68.0%	6,610	25,619	11,821	1,391		1,656								47,097
Chesterfield	DBY	EM	LD	LD	20,875	47.3%	3,045	59.6%	17,830	3,605	20,875	997									814	44,121
Chichester	WSX	SE	Con	Con	25,302	48.3%	10,860	66.6%	9,632	25,302	14,442	3,025										52,401
Chingford and Woodford Green	LND	LND	Con	Con	20,555	53.2%	10,641	63.0%	9,914	20,555	6,832	1,078									269	38,648
Chipping Barnet	LND	LND	Con	Con	19,744	46.6%	5,960	64.0%	13,784	19,744	6,671	924		1,199							59	42,381
Chorley	LAN	NW	Lab	Lab	25,131	50.7%	7,625	62.9%	25,131	17,506	6,932											49,569
Christchurch	DOR	SW	Con	Con	28,208	54.7%	15,559	69.6%	8,051	28,208	12,649	2,657										51,565
Cities of London and Westminster	LND	LND	Con	Con	17,260	47.3%	8,095	50.7%	9,165	17,260	7,306	399		1,544							813	36,487
City of Chester	CHS	NW	Lab	Lab	17,458	38.9%	915	64.3%	17,458	16,543	9,818	776									308	44,903
City of Durham	DUR	NE	Lab	Lab	20,928	47.2%	3,274	62.1%	20,928	4,179	17,654										1,603	44,364
City of York	NYK	YTH	Lab	Lab	21,836	46.9%	10,472	61.7%	21,836	11,364	10,166	832		2,113							286	46,597
Cleethorpes	HUM	YTH	Lab	Lab	18,889	43.3%	2,642	61.6%	18,889	16,247	6,437	2,016										43,589
Clwyd South	CON	WLS	Lab	Lab	14,808	45.0%	6,348	62.9%	14,808	8,460	5,105	644					3,111				803	32,931
Clwyd West	CON	WLS	Lab	Con	12,909	36.2%	133	64.0%	12,776	12,909	4,723	512					3,874				820	35,614
Coatbridge, Chryston and Bellshill	SCT	SCT	New	Lab	24,725	64.5%	19,519	56.9%	24,725	2,775	4,605		5,206								1,033	38,344
Colchester	ESS	E	LD	LD	21,145	47.1%	6,277	56.8%	8,886	14,868	21,145											44,899
Colne Valley	WYK	YTH	Lab	Lab	17,536	35.8%	1,501	66.0%	17,536	16,035	11,822			1,295		1,430					802	48,920
Congleton	CHS	NW	Con	Con	21,189	45.4%	8,246	64.2%	12,943	21,189	12,550											46,682
Conwy	CON	WLS	Lab	Lab	12,479	37.1%	3,081	62.5%	12,479	9,398	6,723	298		512			3,730				517	33,657
Copeland	CMA	NW	Lab	Lab	17,033	50.5%	6,320	62.3%	17,033	10,713	3,880	735									1,396	33,757
Corby	NTH	EM	Lab	Lab	20,913	43.1%	1,517	65.6%	20,913	19,396	6,184	1,278									756	48,527
Coventry North East	WMD	WM	Lab	Lab	21,178	56.9%	14,222	53.0%	21,178	6,956	6,123	1,064									1,874	37,195
Coventry North West	WMD	WM	Lab	Lab	20,942	48.2%	9,315	59.4%	20,942	11,627	7,932	766				1,556					615	43,438
Coventry South	WMD	WM	Lab	Lab	18,649	45.8%	6,255	59.1%	18,649	12,394	7,228	829									1,585	40,685
Crawley	WSX	SE	Lab	Lab	16,411	39.1%	37	58.4%	16,411	16,374	6,503	935				1,277					473	41,973
Crewe and Nantwich	CHS	NW	Lab	Lab	21,240	48.8%	7,078	60.0%	21,240	14,162	8,083											43,485
Crosby	MSY	NW	Lab	Lab	17,463	48.2%	5,840	66.7%	17,463	11,623	6,298	454									356	36,194
Croydon Central	LND	LND	Lab	Con	19,974	40.8%	75	60.3%	19,899	19,974	6,384	1,066		1,036							598	48,957
Croydon North	LND	LND	Lab	Lab	23,555	53.7%	13,888	52.5%	23,555	9,667	7,590	770		1,248							1,047	43,877
Croydon South	LND	LND	Con	Con	25,320	51.8%	13,528	64.5%	11,792	25,320	10,049	1,054									682	48,897
Cumbernauld, Kilsyth and Kirkintilloch East	SCT	SCT	New	Lab	20,251	51.8%	11,562	60.4%	20,251	2,718	5,817		8,689								1,613	39,088
Cynon Valley	MGM	WLS	Lab	Lab	17,074	64.1%	13,259	59.5%	17,074	2,062	2,991	705					3,815					26,647
Dagenham	LND	LND	Lab	Lab	15,446	50.1%	7,605	51.3%	15,446	7,841	3,106	1,578				2,870						30,841
Darlington	DUR	NE	Lab	Lab	20,643	52.4%	10,404	60.9%	20,643	10,239	7,269	730									507	39,388
Dartford	KEN	SE	Lab	Lab	19,909	42.6%	706	63.2%	19,909	19,203	5,036	1,407									1,224	46,779
Daventry	NTH	EM	Con	Con	31,206	51.6%	14,686	68.1%	16,520	31,206	9,964	1,927									822	60,439
Delyn	CON	WLS	Lab	Lab	15,540	45.7%	6,644	63.7%	15,540	8,896	6,089	533					2,524				422	34,004
Denton and Reddish	GTM	NW	Lab	Lab	20,340	57.4%	13,498	51.9%	20,340	6,842	5,814	1,120				1,326						35,442
Derby North	DBY	EM	Lab	Lab	19,272	44.0%	3,757	64.3%	19,272	15,515	7,209	864									958	43,818
Derby South	DBY	EM	Lab	Lab	19,683	45.4%	5,657	61.6%	19,683	8,211	14,026	845									608	43,373
Devizes	WIL	SW	Con	Con	27,253	48.5%	13,194	65.2%	12,519	27,253	14,059	2,315										56,146
Dewsbury	WYK	YTH	Lab	Lab	15,807	41.0%	4,615	62.0%	15,807	11,192	5,624			593		5,066					313	38,595
Don Valley	SYK	YTH	Lab	Lab	19,418	52.7%	8,598	55.1%	19,418	10,820	6,626											36,864
Doncaster Central	SYK	YTH	Lab	Lab	17,617	51.3%	9,802	52.3%	17,617	6,489	7,815	1,191				1,239						34,351
Doncaster North	SYK	YTH	Lab	Lab	17,531	55.5%	12,656	51.1%	17,531	4,875	3,800	940				1,506					2,926	31,578
Dover	KEN	SE	Lab	Lab	21,680	45.3%	4,941	67.6%	21,680	16,739	7,607	1,252									606	47,884
Dudley North	WMD	WM	Lab	Lab	18,306	44.2%	5,432	60.2%	18,306	12,874	4,257	1,949				4,022						41,408
Dudley South	WMD	WM	Lab	Lab	17,800	45.3%	4,244	60.2%	17,800	13,556	4,808	1,271				1,841						39,276
Dulwich and West Norwood	LND	LND	Lab	Lab	19,059	45.4%	8,807	57.0%	19,059	9,200	10,252	290		2,741							447	41,989
Dumfries and Galloway	SCT	SCT	New	Lab	20,924	41.1%	2,922	68.5%	20,924	18,002	4,259		6,182	745							779	50,891
Dumfriesshire, Clydesdale and Tweeddale	SCT	SCT	New	Con	16,141	36.2%	1,738	67.6%	14,403	16,141	9,046	430	4,075								521	44,616
Dundee East	SCT	SCT	Lab	SNP	14,708	37.2%	383	62.4%	14,325	5,061	4,498	292	14,708								656	39,540
Dundee West	SCT	SCT	Lab	Lab	16,468	44.6%	5,379	56.1%	16,468	3,062	5,323		11,089								994	36,936
Dunfermline and West Fife	SCT	SCT	New	Lab	20,111	47.4%	11,562	59.9%	20,111	4,376	8,549	643	8,026								689	42,394
Ealing North	LND	LND	Lab	Lab	20,956	45.1%	7,059	59.8%	20,956	13,897	9,148	692		1,319							495	46,507
Ealing Southall	LND	LND	Lab	Lab	22,937	48.8%	11,440	56.5%	22,937	10,147	11,497			2,175							289	47,045
Ealing, Acton and Shepherd's Bush	LND	LND	Lab	Lab	16,579	41.8%	5,520	56.2%	16,579	11,059	9,986			1,999								39,623
Easington	DUR	NE	Lab	Lab	22,733	71.4%	18,636	52.1%	22,733	3,400	4,097					1,042					583	31,855
East Antrim	NIR	NIR	UUP	DUP	15,766	49.6%	7,304	54.8%							15,766			828	8,462	1,695	5,016	31,767
East Devon	DEV	SW	Con	Con	23,075	46.9%	7,936	69.4%	7,598	23,075	15,139	3,035									400	49,247
East Dunbartonshire	SCT	SCT	New	LD	19,533	41.8%	4,061	73.1%	15,472	7,708	19,533		2,716	876							419	46,724
East Ham	LND	LND	Lab	Lab	21,326	53.9%	13,155	50.7%	21,326	5,196	4,296										8,751	39,569
East Hampshire	HAM	SE	Con	Con	24,273	45.7%	5,509	66.9%	8,519	24,273	18,764	1,583										53,139
East Kilbride, Strathaven and Lesmahagow	SCT	SCT	New	Lab	23,264	48.7%	14,723	63.5%	23,264	4,776	7,904		8,541	1,575							1,673	47,733
East Londonderry	NIR	NIR	DUP	DUP	15,225	42.9%	7,727	60.7%							15,225			5,709	7,498	6,077	995	35,504
East Lothian	SCT	SCT	Lab	Lab	18,983	41.5%	7,620	64.5%	18,983	7,315	11,363	306	5,995	1,132							682	45,776
East Renfrewshire	SCT	SCT	Lab (Note: The boundaries of this Scottish seat remained unchanged in the Fifth Periodic Review of Westminster constituencies, but it was renamed from Eastwood)	Lab	20,815	43.9%	6,657	72.1%	20,815	14,158	8,659		3,245								528	47,405
East Surrey	SRY	SE	Con	Con	27,659	56.2%	15,921	66.6%	7,288	27,659	11,738	2,158									410	49,253
East Worthing and Shoreham	WSX	SE	Con	Con	19,548	43.9%	8,183	61.6%	11,365	19,548	10,844	2,109									677	44,543
East Yorkshire	HUM	YTH	Con	Con	21,215	45.2%	6,283	61.6%	14,932	21,215	9,075	1,703										46,925
Eastbourne	SXE	SE	Con	Con	21,033	43.5%	1,124	64.8%	5,268	21,033	19,909	1,233		949								48,392
Eastleigh	HAM	SE	LD	LD	19,216	38.6%	568	64.8%	10,238	18,648	19,216	1,669										49,771
Eccles	GTM	NW	Lab	Lab	19,702	56.9%	12,886	50.2%	19,702	6,816	6,429	1,685										34,632
Eddisbury	CHS	NW	Con	Con	21,181	46.4%	6,195	63.2%	14,986	21,181	8,182	1,325										45,674
Edinburgh East	SCT	SCT	New	Lab	15,899	40.0%	6,202	61.3%	15,899	4,093	9,697		6,760	2,266							994	39,709
Edinburgh North and Leith	SCT	SCT	Lab	Lab	14,597	34.2%	2,153	62.7%	14,597	7,969	12,444		4,344	2,482							804	42,640
Edinburgh South	SCT	SCT	Lab	Lab	14,188	33.2%	405	69.9%	14,188	10,291	13,783		2,635	1,387							414	42,698
Edinburgh South West	SCT	SCT	New	Lab	17,476	39.8%	7,242	65.4%	17,476	10,234	9,252	205	4,654	1,520							585	43,926
Edinburgh West	SCT	SCT	LD	LD	22,417	49.5%	13,600	68.9%	8,433	8,817	22,417		4,124	964							510	45,265
Edmonton	LND	LND	Lab	Lab	18,456	53.2%	8,075	58.8%	18,456	10,381	4,162	815		889								34,703
Ellesmere Port and Neston	CHS	NW	Lab	Lab	20,371	48.4%	6,486	61.6%	20,371	13,885	6,607	1,206										42,069
Elmet	WYK	YTH	Lab	Lab	22,260	47.2%	4,528	68.8%	22,260	17,732	5,923					1,231						47,146
Eltham	LND	LND	Lab	Lab	15,381	43.6%	3,276	62.2%	15,381	12,105	5,669	1,024				979					147	35,305
Enfield North	LND	LND	Lab	Lab	18,055	44.3%	1,920	64.0%	18,055	16,135	4,642	750				1,004					163	40,749
Enfield Southgate	LND	LND	Lab	Con	18,830	44.6%	1,747	66.2%	17,083	18,830	4,724	490		1,083								42,210
Epping Forest	ESS	E	Con	Con	23,783	53.0%	14,358	61.6%	9,425	23,783	8,279	1,014				1,728					631	44,860
Epsom and Ewell	SRY	SE	Con	Con	27,146	54.4%	16,447	66.1%	10,265	27,146	10,699	1,769										49,879
Erewash	DBY	EM	Lab	Lab	22,472	44.5%	7,084	64.5%	22,472	15,388	7,073	941				1,319					3,360	50,553
Erith and Thamesmead	LND	LND	Lab	Lab	20,483	54.4%	11,500	52.3%	20,483	8,983	5,088	1,477				1,620						37,651
Esher and Walton	SRY	SE	Con	Con	21,882	45.7%	7,727	62.2%	9,309	21,882	14,155	1,582									950	47,878
Exeter	DEV	SW	Lab	Lab	22,619	41.1%	7,665	64.8%	22,619	14,954	11,340	1,854		1,896							2,405	55,068
Falkirk	SCT	SCT	New	Lab	23,264	50.9%	13,475	59.6%	23,264	4,538	7,321		9,789								838	45,750
Falmouth and Camborne	CUL	SW	Lab	LD	16,747	34.9%	1,886	67.1%	14,861	12,644	16,747	1,820									1,943	48,015
Fareham	HAM	SE	Con	Con	24,151	49.7%	11,702	66.9%	12,449	24,151	10,551	1,425										48,576
Faversham and Mid Kent	KEN	SE	Con	Con	21,690	49.7%	8,720	65.7%	12,970	21,690	7,204	1,152									610	43,626
Feltham and Heston	LND	LND	Lab	Lab	17,741	47.6%	6,820	48.7%	17,741	10,921	6,177	612		815							1,016	37,282
Fermanagh and South Tyrone	NIR	NIR	SF	SF	18,638	38.2%	4,582	73.5%							14,056			18,638	8,869	7,230		48,793
Finchley and Golders Green	LND	LND	Lab	Lab	17,487	40.5%	741	61.7%	17,487	16,746	7,282	453		1,136							110	43,214
Folkestone and Hythe	KEN	SE	Con	Con	26,161	53.9%	11,680	68.4%	6,053	26,161	14,481	619		688							501	48,503
Forest of Dean	GLS	SW	Lab	Con	19,474	40.9%	2,049	70.8%	17,425	19,474	8,185	1,140		991							425	47,640
Foyle	NIR	NIR	SDLP	SDLP	21,119	46.3%	5,957	66.3%							6,557			15,162	1,091	21,119	1,680	45,609
Fylde	LAN	NW	Con	Con	24,287	53.4%	12,459	60.1%	11,828	24,287	7,748										1,647	45,510
Gainsborough	LIN	EM	Con	Con	20,040	43.9%	8,003	64.6%	11,744	20,040	12,037	1,860										45,681
Gateshead East and Washington West	TWR	NE	Lab	Lab	20,997	60.6%	13,407	56.4%	20,997	4,812	7,590	1,269										34,668
Gedling	NTT	EM	Lab	Lab	20,329	46.1%	3,811	63.9%	20,329	16,518	6,070	741									411	44,069
Gillingham	KEN	SE	Lab	Lab	18,621	41.2%	254	62.5%	18,621	18,367	6,734	1,191									254	45,167
Glasgow Central	SCT	SCT	New	Lab	13,518	48.7%	8,531	43.3%	13,518	1,757	4,987		4,148	1,372		371					1,584	27,737
Glasgow East	SCT	SCT	New	Lab	18,775	60.7%	13,507	48.2%	18,775	2,135	3,665		5,268								1,096	30,939
Glasgow North	SCT	SCT	New	Lab	11,001	39.4%	3,338	50.4%	11,001	2,441	7,663		3,614	2,135							1,067	27,921
Glasgow North East	SCT	SCT	New	Spkr	15,153	53.3%	10,134	45.8%					5,019			920					22,479	28,418
Glasgow North West	SCT	SCT	New	Lab	16,748	49.2%	10,093	55.0%	16,748	3,262	6,655		4,676	1,333							1,387	34,061
Glasgow South	SCT	SCT	New	Lab	18,153	47.2%	10,832	55.8%	18,153	4,836	7,321		4,860	1,692							1,569	38,431
Glasgow South West	SCT	SCT	New	Lab	18,653	60.2%	13,896	50.0%	18,653	1,786	3,593		4,757								2,188	30,977
Glenrothes	SCT	SCT	New	Lab	19,395	51.9%	10,664	56.1%	19,395	2,651	4,728	440	8,731								1,421	37,366
Gloucester	GLS	SW	Lab	Lab	23,138	44.7%	4,271	62.8%	23,138	18,867	7,825	1,116		857								51,803
Gordon	SCT	SCT	LD	LD	20,008	45.0%	11,026	61.8%	8,982	7,842	20,008		7,098								508	44,438
Gosport	HAM	SE	Con	Con	19,268	44.8%	5,730	60.5%	13,538	19,268	7,145	1,825		1,258								43,034
Gower	WGM	WLS	Lab	Lab	16,786	42.5%	6,703	65.4%	16,786	10,083	7,291	1,264		1,029			3,089					39,542
Grantham and Stamford	LIN	EM	Con	Con	22,109	46.9%	7,445	63.6%	14,664	22,109	7,838	1,498									1,038	47,147
Gravesham	KEN	SE	Lab	Con	19,739	43.7%	654	65.8%	19,085	19,739	4,851	850									654	45,179
Great Grimsby	HUM	YTH	Lab	Lab	15,512	47.1%	7,654	51.7%	15,512	7,858	6,356	1,239		661		1,338						32,964
Great Yarmouth	NFK	E	Lab	Lab	18,850	45.6%	3,055	60.1%	18,850	15,795	4,585	1,759									389	41,378
Greenwich and Woolwich	LND	LND	Lab	Lab	17,527	49.2%	10,146	56.0%	17,527	7,142	7,381	709		1,579							1,277	35,615
Guildford	SRY	SE	LD	Con	22,595	43.8%	347	68.3%	5,054	22,595	22,248	645		811							278	51,631
Hackney North and Stoke Newington	LND	LND	Lab	Lab	14,268	48.6%	7,427	49.6%	14,268	4,218	6,841			2,907							1,146	29,380
Hackney South and Shoreditch	LND	LND	Lab	Lab	17,048	52.9%	10,204	44.3%	17,048	4,524	6,844			1,779							2,042	32,237
Halesowen and Rowley Regis	WMD	WM	Lab	Lab	19,243	46.6%	4,337	62.9%	19,243	14,906	5,204	1,974										41,327
Halifax	WYK	YTH	Lab	Lab	16,579	41.8%	3,417	61.1%	16,579	13,162	7,100					2,627					191	39,659
Haltemprice and Howden	HUM	YTH	Con	Con	22,792	47.5%	5,116	70.1%	6,104	22,792	17,676	659				798						48,029
Halton	CHS	NW	Lab	Lab	21,460	62.8%	14,606	53.1%	21,460	6,854	5,869											34,183
Hammersmith and Fulham	LND	LND	Lab	Con	22,407	45.4%	5,029	62.4%	17,378	22,407	7,116	493		1,933								49,327
Hampstead and Highgate	LND	LND	Lab	Lab	14,615	38.3%	3,729	55.5%	14,615	10,886	10,293	275		2,013							91	38,173
Harborough	LEI	EM	Con	Con	20,536	42.9%	3,892	64.3%	9,222	20,536	16,644	1,520										47,922
Harlow	ESS	E	Lab	Lab	16,453	41.4%	97	62.6%	16,453	16,356	5,002	981									941	39,733
Harrogate and Knaresborough	NYK	YTH	LD	LD	24,113	56.3%	10,429	65.3%	3,627	13,684	24,113	845				466					123	42,858
Harrow East	LND	LND	Lab	Lab	23,445	46.1%	4,730	60.6%	23,445	18,715	7,747	916										50,823
Harrow West	LND	LND	Lab	Lab	20,298	42.5%	2,028	64.4%	20,298	18,270	8,188	576									427	47,759
Hartlepool	CLV	NE	Lab (Note: 2004 Hartlepool by-election)	Lab	18,251	51.5%	7,478	51.5%	18,251	4,058	10,773	1,256		288							810	35,436
Harwich	ESS	E	Lab	Con	21,235	42.1%	920	62.6%	20,315	21,235	5,913	2,314									631	50,408
Hastings and Rye	SXE	SE	Lab	Lab	18,107	42.1%	2,026	59.1%	18,107	16,081	6,479	1,098		1,032							207	43,004
Havant	HAM	SE	Con	Con	18,370	44.4%	6,508	60.3%	11,862	18,370	8,358	998		1,006		562					195	41,351
Hayes and Harlington	LND	LND	Lab	Lab	19,009	58.7%	10,847	56.4%	19,009	8,162	3,174	552		442		830					220	32,389
Hazel Grove	GTM	NW	LD	LD	19,355	49.5%	7,748	60.8%	6,834	11,607	19,355	1,321										39,117
Hemel Hempstead	HRT	E	Lab	Con	19,000	40.3%	499	64.4%	18,501	19,000	8,089	1,518										47,108
Hemsworth	WYK	YTH	Lab	Lab	21,630	58.8%	13,481	54.6%	21,630	8,149	5,766										1,247	36,792
Hendon	LND	LND	Lab	Lab	18,596	44.4%	2,699	58.2%	18,596	15,897	5,831	637		754							124	41,839
Henley	OXF	SE	Con	Con	24,894	53.5%	12,793	67.9%	6,862	24,894	12,101	1,162		1,518								46,537
Hereford	HWR	WM	LD	LD	20,285	43.3%	962	66.2%	4,800	19,323	20,285	1,030		1,052							404	46,894
Hertford and Stortford	HRT	E	Con	Con	25,074	50.5%	13,097	67.7%	11,977	25,074	9,129	1,026		1,914							572	49,692
Hertsmere	HRT	E	Con	Con	22,665	53.2%	11,093	63.0%	11,572	22,665	7,817										518	42,572
Hexham	NBL	NE	Con	Con	17,605	42.4%	5,020	68.8%	12,585	17,605	10,673										650	41,513
Heywood and Middleton	GTM	NW	Lab	Lab	19,438	49.8%	11,083	54.6%	19,438	8,355	7,261	767				1,855					1,377	39,053
High Peak	DBY	EM	Lab	Lab	19,809	39.6%	735	66.4%	19,809	19,074	10,000	1,106										49,989
Hitchin and Harpenden	HRT	E	Con	Con	23,627	49.9%	11,393	70.5%	10,499	23,627	12,234	828									199	47,387
Holborn and St Pancras	LND	LND	Lab	Lab	14,857	43.2%	4,787	50.3%	14,857	6,482	10,070			2,798							152	34,359
Hornchurch	LND	LND	Lab	Con	16,355	42.8%	480	63.5%	15,875	16,355	2,894	1,033				1,313					699	38,169
Hornsey and Wood Green	LND	LND	Lab	LD	20,512	43.3%	2,395	61.8%	18,117	6,014	20,512	310		2,377								47,330
Horsham	WSX	SE	Con	Con	27,240	50.0%	12,627	68.2%	9,320	27,240	14,613	2,552									770	54,495
Houghton and Washington East	TWR	NE	Lab	Lab	22,310	64.3%	16,065	51.7%	22,310	4,772	6,245					1,367						34,694
Hove	SXE	SE	Lab	Lab	16,786	37.5%	420	64.1%	16,786	16,366	8,002	575		2,575							492	44,796
Huddersfield	WYK	YTH	Lab	Lab	16,341	46.8%	8,351	56.6%	16,341	7,597	7,990			1,651		1,036					325	34,940
Huntingdon	CAM	E	Con	Con	26,646	50.8%	12,847	62.5%	9,821	26,646	13,799	2,152										52,418
Hyndburn	LAN	NW	Lab	Lab	18,136	46.0%	5,587	58.8%	18,136	12,549	5,577	743				2,444						39,449
Ilford North	LND	LND	Lab	Con	18,781	43.7%	1,653	60.8%	17,128	18,781	5,896	902									293	43,000
Ilford South	LND	LND	Lab	Lab	20,856	48.9%	9,228	53.6%	20,856	11,628	8,761	685									763	42,693
Inverclyde	SCT	SCT	New	Lab	18,318	50.7%	11,259	60.9%	18,318	3,692	6,123		7,059								906	36,098
Inverness, Nairn, Badenoch and Strathspey	SCT	SCT	New	LD	17,830	40.3%	4,148	63.6%	13,682	4,579	17,830		5,992	1,065							1,107	44,255
Ipswich	SFK	E	Lab (Note: 2001 Ipswich by-election)	Lab	18,336	43.9%	5,332	60.7%	18,336	13,004	8,464	1,134									840	41,778
Isle of Wight	IOW	SE	Con	Con	32,717	48.9%	12,978	62.0%	11,484	32,717	19,739	2,352									551	66,843
Islington North	LND	LND	Lab	Lab	16,118	51.2%	6,716	53.9%	16,118	3,740	9,402			2,234								31,494
Islington South and Finsbury	LND	LND	Lab	Lab	12,345	39.9%	484	53.6%	12,345	4,594	11,861	470		1,471							220	30,961
Islwyn	GNT	WLS	Lab	Lab	19,687	63.8%	15,740	61.6%	19,687	3,358	3,873						3,947					30,865
Jarrow	TWR	NE	Lab	Lab	20,554	60.5%	13,904	55.0%	20,554	4,807	6,650	1,567									400	33,978
Keighley	WYK	YTH	Lab	Lab	20,720	44.7%	4,852	67.9%	20,720	15,868	5,484					4,240						46,312
Kensington and Chelsea	LND	LND	Con	Con	18,144	57.9%	12,418	50.0%	5,521	18,144	5,726	395		1,342							208	31,336
Kettering	NTH	EM	Lab	Con	25,401	45.6%	3,301	68.0%	22,100	25,401	6,882	1,263										55,646
Kilmarnock and Loudoun	SCT	SCT	Lab	Lab	20,976	47.3%	8,703	60.9%	20,976	5,026	4,945	330	12,273								833	44,383
Kingston and Surbiton	LND	LND	LD	LD	25,397	51.0%	8,966	68.5%	6,553	16,431	25,397	657									712	49,750
Kingston upon Hull East	HUM	YTH	Lab	Lab	17,609	56.8%	11,747	47.4%	17,609	4,038	5,862					1,022					2,491	31,022
Kingston upon Hull North	HUM	YTH	Lab	Lab	15,364	51.9%	7,351	47.3%	15,364	3,822	8,013			858		766					761	29,584
Kingston upon Hull West and Hessle	HUM	YTH	Lab	Lab	15,305	55.0%	9,450	45.2%	15,305	5,769	5,855										889	27,818
Kingswood	AVN	SW	Lab	Lab	26,491	47.0%	7,873	63.7%	26,491	18,618	9,089	1,444									669	56,311
Kirkcaldy and Cowdenbeath	SCT	SCT	New	Lab	24,278	58.1%	18,216	58.4%	24,278	4,308	5,450	516	6,062								1,182	41,796
Knowsley North and Sefton East	MSY	NW	Lab	Lab	23,461	63.3%	16,269	52.6%	23,461	5,064	7,192					872					464	37,053
Knowsley South	MSY	NW	Lab	Lab	24,820	68.1%	17,688	51.5%	24,820	4,492	7,132											36,444
Lagan Valley	NIR	NIR	UUP	DUP	23,289	54.7%	14,117	60.6%							23,289			3,197	9,172	2,598	4,316	42,572
Lanark and Hamilton East	SCT	SCT	New	Lab	20,072	46.0%	11,947	59.1%	20,072	5,576	8,125	437	7,746								1,633	43,589
Lancaster and Wyre	LAN	NW	Lab	Con	22,266	42.8%	4,171	64.5%	18,095	22,266	8,453	969		2,278								52,061
Leeds Central	WYK	YTH	Lab	Lab	17,526	60.0%	11,866	46.4%	17,526	3,865	5,660	494				1,201					440	29,186
Leeds East	WYK	YTH	Lab	Lab	17,799	59.2%	11,578	54.9%	17,799	5,557	6,221										500	30,077
Leeds North East	WYK	YTH	Lab	Lab	18,632	44.9%	5,262	65.5%	18,632	13,370	8,427										1,038	41,467
Leeds North West	WYK	YTH	Lab	LD	16,612	37.2%	1,877	62.4%	14,735	11,510	16,612			1,128							726	44,711
Leeds West	WYK	YTH	Lab	Lab	18,704	55.5%	12,810	53.6%	18,704	4,807	5,894	628		2,519		1,166						33,718
Leicester East	LEI	EM	Lab	Lab	24,015	58.1%	15,876	62.2%	24,015	8,139	7,052										2,100	41,306
Leicester South	LEI	EM	LD (Note: 2004 Leicester South by-election)	Lab	16,688	39.3%	3,717	58.7%	16,688	7,549	12,971			1,379							3,824	42,411
Leicester West	LEI	EM	Lab	Lab	17,184	51.7%	9,070	53.3%	17,184	8,114	5,803			1,571							552	33,224
Leigh	GTM	NW	Lab	Lab	23,097	63.3%	17,272	50.3%	23,097	5,825	4,962										2,600	36,484
Leominster	HWR	WM	Con	Con	25,407	52.1%	13,187	77.3%	7,424	25,407	12,220	1,551		2,191								48,793
Lewes	SXE	SE	LD	LD	24,376	52.4%	8,474	69.4%	4,169	15,902	24,376	1,034		1,071								46,552
Lewisham Deptford	LND	LND	Lab	Lab	16,902	55.6%	11,811	52.1%	16,902	3,773	5,091	518		3,367							742	30,393
Lewisham East	LND	LND	Lab	Lab	14,263	45.8%	6,751	56.3%	14,263	7,512	6,787	697		1,243							625	31,127
Lewisham West	LND	LND	Lab	Lab	16,611	52.0%	9,932	54.7%	16,611	6,396	6,679	773		1,464								31,923
Leyton and Wanstead	LND	LND	Lab	Lab	15,234	45.8%	6,857	55.0%	15,234	7,393	8,377	591		1,522							155	33,272
Lichfield	STS	WM	Con	Con	21,274	48.6%	7,080	66.7%	14,194	21,274	6,804	1,472										43,744
Lincoln	LIN	EM	Lab	Lab	16,724	45.4%	4,614	56.5%	16,724	12,110	6,715	1,308										36,857
Linlithgow and East Falkirk	SCT	SCT	New	Lab	22,121	47.7%	11,202	60.5%	22,121	5,486	7,100		10,919								763	46,389
Liverpool Garston	MSY	NW	Lab	Lab	18,900	54.0%	7,193	54.9%	18,900	3,424	11,707	780									163	34,974
Liverpool Riverside	MSY	NW	Lab	Lab	17,951	57.6%	10,214	41.5%	17,951	2,843	7,737	455		1,707							498	31,191
Liverpool Walton	MSY	NW	Lab	Lab	20,322	72.8%	15,957	45.0%	20,322	1,655	4,365	1,108									480	27,930
Liverpool Wavertree	MSY	NW	Lab	Lab	18,441	52.4%	5,173	50.8%	18,441	2,331	13,268	660									471	35,171
Liverpool West Derby	MSY	NW	Lab	Lab	19,140	62.8%	15,225	47.2%	19,140	2,567	3,915	538									4,304	30,464
Livingston	SCT	SCT	Lab	Lab	22,657	51.1%	13,097	58.1%	22,657	4,499	6,832		9,560								789	44,337
Llanelli	DFD	WLS	Lab	Lab	16,592	46.9%	7,234	63.9%	16,592	4,844	4,550						9,358					35,344
Loughborough	LEI	EM	Lab	Lab	19,098	41.4%	1,996	63.8%	19,098	17,102	8,258	1,094									588	46,140
Louth and Horncastle	LIN	EM	Con	Con	21,744	46.6%	9,896	62.0%	11,848	21,744	9,480	3,611										46,683
Ludlow	SAL	WM	LD	Con	20,979	45.1%	2,027	72.1%	4,974	20,979	18,952	783		852								46,540
Luton North	BDF	E	Lab	Lab	19,062	48.7%	6,487	57.4%	19,062	12,575	6,081	1,255									149	39,122
Luton South	BDF	E	Lab	Lab	16,610	42.7%	5,650	54.1%	16,610	10,960	8,778	957		790							823	38,918
Macclesfield	CHS	NW	Con	Con	22,628	49.6%	9,401	63.1%	13,227	22,628	8,918										848	45,621
Maidenhead	BRK	SE	Con	Con	23,312	50.8%	6,231	71.7%	4,144	23,312	17,081	609				704						45,850
Maidstone and The Weald	KEN	SE	Con	Con	25,670	52.7%	14,856	65.8%	10,814	25,670	10,808	1,463										48,755
Makerfield	GTM	NW	Lab	Lab	22,494	63.2%	18,149	51.5%	22,494	4,345	3,789	962				1,221					2,769	35,580
Maldon and East Chelmsford	ESS	E	Con	Con	23,732	51.5%	12,573	66.3%	11,159	23,732	9,270	1,930										46,091
Manchester Blackley	GTM	NW	Lab	Lab	17,187	62.3%	12,027	45.8%	17,187	3,690	5,160	1,554										27,591
Manchester Central	GTM	NW	Lab	Lab	16,993	58.1%	9,776	42.0%	16,993	2,504	7,217	272		1,292							986	29,264
Manchester Gorton	GTM	NW	Lab	Lab	15,480	53.2%	5,808	45.0%	15,480	2,848	9,672	783									340	29,123
Manchester Withington	GTM	NW	Lab	LD	15,872	42.4%	667	55.3%	15,205	3,919	15,872	424		1,595							442	37,457
Mansfield	NTT	EM	Lab	Lab	18,400	48.1%	11,365	55.4%	18,400	7,035	5,316										7,525	38,276
Medway	KEN	SE	Lab	Lab	17,333	42.2%	213	61.1%	17,333	17,120	5,152	1,488										41,093
Meirionnydd Nant Conwy	CON	WLS	PC	PC	10,597	51.3%	6,614	61.7%	3,983	3,402	2,192	466					10,597					20,640
Meriden	WMD	WM	Con	Con	22,416	48.2%	7,009	60.1%	15,407	22,416	7,113	1,567										46,503
Merthyr Tydfil and Rhymney	GNT	WLS	Lab	Lab	18,129	60.5%	13,934	55.5%	18,129	2,680	4,195	699					2,972				1,301	29,976
Mid Bedfordshire	BDF	E	Con	Con	23,345	46.3%	11,355	68.3%	11,351	23,345	11,990	1,372		1,292							1,070	50,420
Mid Dorset and North Poole	DOR	SW	LD	LD	22,000	48.7%	5,482	68.5%	5,221	16,518	22,000	1,420										45,159
Mid Norfolk	NFK	E	Con	Con	23,564	43.1%	7,560	67.0%	16,004	23,564	12,988	2,178										54,734
Mid Sussex	WSX	SE	Con	Con	23,765	48.0%	5,890	68.6%	6,280	23,765	17,875	1,574										49,494
Mid Ulster	NIR	NIR	SF	SF	21,641	47.6%	10,976	73.2%							10,665			21,641	4,853	7,922	345	45,426
Mid Worcestershire	HWR	WM	Con	Con	24,783	51.5%	13,327	67.3%	11,456	24,783	9,796	2,092										48,127
Middlesbrough	CLV	NE	Lab	Lab	18,562	57.8%	12,567	48.8%	18,562	5,263	5,995	768				819					733	32,140
Middlesbrough South and East Cleveland	CLV	NE	Lab	Lab	21,945	50.2%	8,000	60.8%	21,945	13,945	6,049	658				1,099						43,696
Midlothian	SCT	SCT	Lab	Lab	17,153	45.5%	7,265	62.2%	17,153	3,537	9,888		6,400								726	37,704
Milton Keynes South West	BKM	SE	Lab	Lab	20,862	42.8%	4,010	59.2%	20,862	16,852	7,909	1,750		1,336								48,709
Mitcham and Morden	LND	LND	Lab	Lab	22,489	56.4%	12,560	61.2%	22,489	9,929	5,583			1,395							472	39,868
Mole Valley	SRY	SE	Con	Con	27,060	54.8%	11,997	72.5%	5,310	27,060	15,063	1,475									507	49,415
Monmouth	GNT	WLS	Lab	Con	21,396	46.9%	4,527	73.4%	16,869	21,396	5,852	543					993					45,653
Montgomeryshire	POW	WLS	LD	LD	15,419	51.2%	7,173	64.4%	3,454	8,246	15,419	900					2,078					30,097
Moray	SCT	SCT	SNP	SNP	14,196	36.6%	5,676	58.4%	7,919	8,520	7,460		14,196								698	38,793
Morecambe and Lunesdale	LAN	NW	Lab	Lab	20,331	48.8%	4,768	61.4%	20,331	15,563	5,741											41,635
Morley and Rothwell	WYK	YTH	Lab	Lab	21,919	57.0%	12,090	53.5%	21,919	9,829	5,446	1,248										38,442
Motherwell and Wishaw	SCT	SCT	Lab	Lab	21,327	57.5%	15,222	55.4%	21,327	3,440	4,464		6,105								1,773	37,109
Na h-Eileanan an Iar	SCT	SCT	Lab (Note: The boundaries of this Scottish seat remained unchanged in the Fifth Periodic Review of Westminster constituencies, but it was renamed from Western Isles)	SNP	6,213	44.9%	1,441	64.1%	4,772	610	1,096		6,213								1,145	13,836
Neath	WGM	WLS	Lab	Lab	18,835	52.6%	12,710	62.5%	18,835	4,136	5,112			658			6,125				951	35,817
New Forest East	HAM	SE	Con	Con	21,975	48.6%	6,551	65.9%	5,492	21,975	15,424	2,344										45,235
New Forest West	HAM	SE	Con	Con	26,004	56.4%	17,285	66.5%	7,590	26,004	8,719	1,917		1,837								46,067
Newark	NTT	EM	Con	Con	21,946	48.0%	6,464	63.2%	15,482	21,946	7,276	992										45,696
Newbury	BRK	SE	LD	Con	26,771	49.0%	3,460	72.0%	3,239	26,771	23,311	857									495	54,673
Newcastle upon Tyne Central	TWR	NE	Lab	Lab	16,211	45.1%	3,982	52.5%	16,211	5,749	12,229			1,254							477	35,920
Newcastle upon Tyne East and Wallsend	TWR	NE	Lab	Lab	17,462	55.1%	7,565	50.5%	17,462	3,532	9,897										787	31,678
Newcastle upon Tyne North	TWR	NE	Lab	Lab	19,224	50.0%	7,023	67.6%	19,224	6,022	12,201										997	38,444
Newcastle-under-Lyme	STS	WM	Lab	Lab	18,053	45.4%	8,108	61.6%	18,053	9,945	7,528	1,436		918		1,390					518	39,788
Newport East	GNT	WLS	Lab	Lab	14,389	45.2%	6,838	57.9%	14,389	7,459	7,551	945					1,221				260	31,825
Newport West	GNT	WLS	Lab	Lab	16,021	44.8%	5,458	59.3%	16,021	10,563	6,398	848		540			1,278				84	35,732
Newry and Armagh	NIR	NIR	SDLP	SF	20,965	41.4%	8,195	70.6%							9,311			20,965	7,025	12,770	625	50,696
Normanton	WYK	YTH	Lab	Lab	19,161	51.2%	10,002	57.5%	19,161	9,159	6,357					1,967					780	37,424
North Antrim	NIR	NIR	DUP	DUP	25,156	54.8%	17,965	62.1%							25,156			7,191	6,637	5,585	1,357	45,926
North Ayrshire and Arran	SCT	SCT	New	Lab	19,417	43.9%	11,296	59.9%	19,417	8,121	7,264	382	7,938								1,083	44,205
North Cornwall	CUL	SW	LD	LD	23,842	42.6%	3,076	64.5%	6,636	20,766	23,842	3,063									1,675	55,982
North Devon	DEV	SW	LD	LD	23,840	45.9%	4,972	68.1%	4,656	18,868	23,840	2,740		1,826								51,930
North Dorset	DOR	SW	Con	Con	23,714	44.9%	2,244	71.1%	4,596	23,714	21,470	1,918		1,117								52,815
North Down	NIR	NIR	UUP	UUP	16,268	50.4%	4,944	54.4%		822					11,324			205	16,268	1,009	2,662	32,290
North Durham	DUR	NE	Lab	Lab	23,932	64.1%	16,781	55.3%	23,932	6,258	7,151											37,341
North East Bedfordshire	BDF	E	Con	Con	24,725	49.9%	12,251	68.0%	12,474	24,725	10,320	1,986										49,505
North East Cambridgeshire	CAM	E	Con	Con	24,181	47.5%	8,901	59.8%	15,280	24,181	8,693	2,723										50,877
North East Derbyshire	DBY	EM	Lab	Lab	21,416	49.3%	10,065	61.2%	21,416	11,351	8,812	1,855										43,434
North East Fife	SCT	SCT	LD	LD	20,088	52.1%	12,571	62.1%	4,920	7,517	20,088	533	4,011	1,071							416	38,556
North East Hampshire	HAM	SE	Con	Con	25,407	53.7%	12,549	64.8%	7,630	25,407	12,858	1,392										47,287
North East Hertfordshire	HRT	E	Con	Con	22,402	47.3%	9,138	65.6%	13,264	22,402	10,147	1,561										47,374
North East Milton Keynes	BKM	SE	Lab	Con	19,674	39.3%	1,665	63.6%	18,009	19,674	9,789	1,400		1,090							142	50,104
North Essex	ESS	E	Con	Con	22,811	47.6%	10,903	65.7%	11,908	22,811	9,831	1,691		1,718								47,959
North Norfolk	NFK	E	LD	LD	31,515	53.4%	10,606	73.0%	5,447	20,909	31,515	978									116	58,965
North Shropshire	SAL	WM	Con	Con	23,061	49.6%	11,020	61.4%	12,041	23,061	9,175	2,233										46,510
North Southwark and Bermondsey	LND	LND	LD	LD	17,874	47.1%	5,406	48.2%	12,468	4,752	17,874	791		1,137							937	37,959
North Swindon	WIL	SW	Lab	Lab	19,612	43.7%	2,571	61.0%	19,612	17,041	6,831	998									403	44,885
North Thanet	KEN	SE	Con	Con	21,699	49.6%	7,634	60.1%	14,065	21,699	6,279	1,689										43,732
North Tyneside	TWR	NE	Lab	Lab	22,882	61.9%	15,037	57.2%	22,882	7,845	6,212											36,939
North Warwickshire	WAR	WM	Lab	Lab	22,561	48.1%	7,553	62.2%	22,561	15,008	6,212	1,248				1,910						46,939
North West Cambridgeshire	CAM	E	Con	Con	22,504	45.8%	9,833	61.6%	12,671	22,504	11,232	2,685										49,092
North West Durham	DUR	NE	Lab	Lab	21,312	53.9%	13,443	58.0%	21,312	6,463	7,869										3,865	39,509
North West Hampshire	HAM	SE	Con	Con	26,005	50.7%	13,264	64.3%	10,594	26,005	12,741	1,925										51,265
North West Leicestershire	LEI	EM	Lab	Lab	21,449	45.5%	4,477	66.8%	21,449	16,972	5,682	1,563				1,474						47,140
North West Norfolk	NFK	E	Con	Con	25,471	50.3%	9,180	61.6%	16,291	25,471	7,026	1,861										50,649
North Wiltshire	WIL	SW	Con	Con	26,282	46.9%	5,303	69.3%	6,794	26,282	20,979	1,428									578	56,061
Northampton North	NTH	EM	Lab	Lab	16,905	40.2%	3,960	57.9%	16,905	12,945	10,317	1,050									831	42,048
Northampton South	NTH	EM	Lab	Con	23,818	43.7%	4,419	60.7%	19,399	23,818	8,327	1,032									1,905	54,481
Northavon	AVN	SW	LD	LD	30,872	52.3%	11,033	72.2%	6,277	19,839	30,872	1,032		922							114	59,056
Norwich North	NFK	E	Lab	Lab	21,097	44.9%	5,459	61.1%	21,097	15,638	7,616	1,122		1,252							308	47,033
Norwich South	NFK	E	Lab	Lab	15,904	37.7%	3,653	65.0%	15,904	9,567	12,251	597		3,101							770	42,190
Nottingham East	NTT	EM	Lab	Lab	13,787	45.8%	6,939	49.6%	13,787	6,826	6,848	740		1,517							373	30,091
Nottingham North	NTT	EM	Lab	Lab	17,842	58.7%	12,171	49.1%	17,842	5,671	5,190	1,680										30,383
Nottingham South	NTT	EM	Lab	Lab	16,506	47.4%	7,486	50.6%	16,506	9,020	7,961	1,353										34,840
Nuneaton	WAR	WM	Lab	Lab	19,945	44.0%	2,280	61.7%	19,945	17,665	5,884	1,786										45,280
Ochil and South Perthshire	SCT	SCT	New	Lab	14,645	31.4%	688	66.0%	14,645	10,021	6,218	275	13,957	978							603	46,697
Ogmore	MGM	WLS	Lab (Note: 2002 Ogmore by-election)	Lab	18,295	60.4%	13,703	57.8%	18,295	4,243	4,592						3,148					30,278
Old Bexley and Sidcup	LND	LND	Con	Con	22,191	49.8%	9,920	65.3%	12,271	22,191	6,564	2,015				1,227					304	44,572
Oldham East and Saddleworth	GTM	NW	Lab	Lab	17,968	41.4%	3,590	57.3%	17,968	7,901	14,378	873				2,109					138	43,367
Oldham West and Royton	GTM	NW	Lab	Lab	18,452	49.1%	10,454	53.3%	18,452	7,998	7,519	987				2,606						37,562
Orkney and Shetland	SCT	SCT	LD	LD	9,138	51.5%	6,627	53.7%	2,511	2,357	9,138	424	1,833								1,479	17,742
Orpington	LND	LND	Con	Con	26,718	48.8%	4,947	70.0%	4,914	26,718	21,771	1,331										54,734
Oxford East	OXF	SE	Lab	Lab	15,405	36.9%	963	57.9%	15,405	6,992	14,442	715		1,813							2,423	41,790
Oxford West and Abingdon	OXF	SE	LD	LD	24,336	46.3%	7,683	65.6%	8,725	16,653	24,336	795		2,091								52,600
Paisley and Renfrewshire North	SCT	SCT	New	Lab	18,697	45.7%	11,001	64.8%	18,697	5,566	7,464	372	7,696								1,090	40,885
Paisley and Renfrewshire South	SCT	SCT	New	Lab	19,904	52.6%	13,232	62.9%	19,904	3,188	6,672		6,653								1,443	37,860
Pendle	LAN	NW	Lab	Lab	15,250	37.1%	2,180	63.4%	15,250	13,070	9,528	737				2,547						41,132
Penrith and The Border	CMA	NW	Con	Con	24,046	51.3%	11,904	66.1%	8,958	24,046	12,142	1,187									549	46,882
Perth and North Perthshire	SCT	SCT	New	SNP	15,469	33.7%	1,521	64.8%	8,601	13,948	7,403		15,469								509	45,930
Peterborough	CAM	E	Lab	Con	17,364	42.1%	2,740	61.0%	14,624	17,364	6,876	1,242									1,098	41,204
Plymouth Devonport	DEV	SW	Lab	Lab	18,612	44.3%	8,103	57.6%	18,612	10,509	8,000	3,324									1,568	42,013
Plymouth Sutton	DEV	SW	Lab	Lab	15,497	40.6%	4,109	56.8%	15,497	11,388	8,685	2,392									230	38,192
Pontefract and Castleford	WYK	YTH	Lab	Lab	20,973	63.7%	15,246	53.3%	20,973	5,727	3,942					1,835					470	32,947
Pontypridd	MGM	WLS	Lab	Lab	20,919	52.8%	13,191	61.6%	20,919	5,321	7,728	1,013					4,420				233	39,634
Poole	DOR	SW	Con	Con	17,571	43.4%	5,988	63.1%	9,376	17,571	11,583	1,436				547						40,513
Poplar and Canning Town	LND	LND	Lab	Lab	15,628	40.1%	7,129	47.8%	15,628	8,499	5,420			955							8,508	39,010
Portsmouth North	HAM	SE	Lab	Lab	15,412	40.9%	1,139	60.0%	15,412	14,273	6,684	1,348										37,717
Portsmouth South	HAM	SE	LD	LD	17,047	42.2%	3,362	56.9%	8,714	13,685	17,047	928										40,374
Preseli Pembrokeshire	DFD	WLS	Lab	Con	14,106	36.6%	607	69.5%	13,499	14,106	4,963	498		494			4,752				275	38,587
Preston	LAN	NW	Lab	Lab	17,210	50.5%	9,407	53.8%	17,210	7,803	5,701	1,049									2,318	34,081
Pudsey	WYK	YTH	Lab	Lab	21,261	45.8%	5,870	66.0%	21,261	15,391	8,551	1,241										46,444
Putney	LND	LND	Lab	Con	15,497	42.4%	1,766	59.5%	13,731	15,497	5,965	388		993								36,574
Rayleigh	ESS	E	Con	Con	25,609	55.4%	14,726	64.2%	10,883	25,609	7,406	2,295										46,193
Reading East	BRK	SE	Lab	Con	15,557	35.4%	475	60.3%	15,082	15,557	10,619	849		1,548							257	43,912
Reading West	BRK	SE	Lab	Lab	18,940	44.9%	4,682	61.0%	18,940	14,258	6,663	1,180		921							267	42,229
Redcar	CLV	NE	Lab	Lab	19,968	51.4%	12,116	58.0%	19,968	6,954	7,852	564				985					2,538	38,861
Redditch	HWR	WM	Lab	Lab	18,012	44.7%	2,716	62.8%	18,012	15,296	5,602	1,381										40,291
Regent's Park and Kensington North	LND	LND	Lab	Lab	18,196	44.7%	6,131	51.5%	18,196	12,065	7,569	456		1,985							409	40,680
Reigate	SRY	SE	Con	Con	20,884	49.0%	10,988	64.8%	8,896	20,884	9,896	1,921									1,008	42,605
Rhondda	MGM	WLS	Lab	Lab	21,198	68.1%	16,242	61.7%	21,198	1,730	3,264						4,956					31,148
Ribble Valley	LAN	NW	Con	Con	25,834	51.9%	14,171	65.7%	10,924	25,834	11,663	1,345										49,766
Richmond Park	LND	LND	LD	LD	24,011	46.7%	3,731	73.4%	4,768	20,280	24,011	458		1,379							478	51,374
Richmond Yorks	NYK	YTH	Con	Con	26,722	59.1%	17,807	65.0%	8,915	26,722	7,982			1,581								45,200
Rochdale	GTM	NW	Lab	LD	16,787	41.1%	442	58.4%	16,345	4,270	16,787	499		448		1,773					714	40,836
Rochford and Southend East	ESS	E	Con	Con	17,874	45.3%	5,490	55.4%	12,384	17,874	5,967	1,913		1,328								39,466
Romford	LND	LND	Con	Con	21,560	59.1%	11,589	62.3%	9,971	21,560	3,066	797				1,088						36,482
Romsey	HAM	SE	LD	LD	22,465	44.7%	125	69.7%	4,430	22,340	22,465	1,076										50,311
Ross, Skye and Lochaber	SCT	SCT	New	LD	19,100	58.7%	14,249	64.4%	4,851	3,275	19,100	500	3,119	1,097							596	32,538
Rossendale and Darwen	LAN	NW	Lab	Lab	19,073	42.9%	3,676	61.5%	19,073	15,397	6,670	740		821		1,736						44,437
Rother Valley	SYK	YTH	Lab	Lab	21,871	55.4%	14,224	58.1%	21,871	7,647	6,272	1,685				2,020						39,495
Rotherham	SYK	YTH	Lab	Lab	15,840	52.8%	10,681	55.1%	15,840	4,966	5,159	1,122		905		1,986						29,978
Rugby and Kenilworth	WAR	WM	Lab	Con	23,447	41.2%	1,556	68.4%	21,891	23,447	10,143	911									556	56,948
Ruislip-Northwood	LND	LND	Con	Con	18,939	47.7%	8,910	65.3%	8,323	18,939	10,029	646		892							841	39,670
Runnymede and Weybridge	SRY	SE	Con	Con	22,366	51.4%	12,349	58.7%	10,017	22,366	7,771	1,719		1,180							471	43,524
Rushcliffe	NTT	EM	Con	Con	27,899	49.5%	12,974	70.5%	14,925	27,899	9,813	1,358		1,692							624	56,311
Rutherglen and Hamilton West	SCT	SCT	New	Lab	24,054	55.6%	16,112	58.5%	24,054	3,621	7,942	457	6,023								1,164	43,261
Rutland and Melton	LEI	EM	Con	Con	25,237	51.2%	12,930	65.0%	12,307	25,237	9,153	1,554									1,033	49,284
Ryedale	NYK	YTH	Con	Con	21,251	48.2%	10,469	65.1%	9,148	21,251	10,782	1,522									1,417	44,120
Saffron Walden	ESS	E	Con	Con	27,263	51.4%	13,008	68.3%	8,755	27,263	14,255	1,412									1,335	53,020
Salford	GTM	NW	Lab	Lab	13,007	57.6%	7,945	42.4%	13,007	3,440	5,062	1,091										22,600
Salisbury	WIL	SW	Con	Con	25,961	47.8%	11,142	68.1%	9,457	25,961	14,819	2,290		1,555							240	54,322
Scarborough and Whitby	NYK	YTH	Lab	Con	19,248	41.0%	1,245	71.7%	18,003	19,248	7,495	952		1,214								46,912
Scunthorpe	HUM	YTH	Lab	Lab	17,355	53.1%	8,963	54.3%	17,355	8,392	5,556	1,361										32,664
Sedgefield	DUR	NE	Lab	Lab	24,421	58.9%	18,449	62.2%	24,421	5,972	4,935	646									5,497	41,471
Selby	NYK	YTH	Lab	Lab	22,623	43.1%	467	65.4%	22,623	22,156	7,770											52,549
Sevenoaks	KEN	SE	Con	Con	22,437	51.8%	12,970	58.7%	9,101	22,437	9,467	1,309									984	43,298
Sheffield Attercliffe	SYK	YTH	Lab	Lab	22,250	60.1%	15,967	54.6%	22,250	5,329	6,283	1,680				1,477						37,019
Sheffield Brightside	SYK	YTH	Lab	Lab	16,876	68.5%	13,644	48.5%	16,876	2,205	3,232	779				1,537						24,629
Sheffield Central	SYK	YTH	Lab	Lab	14,950	49.9%	7,055	50.1%	14,950	3,094	7,895	415		1,808		539					1,284	29,985
Sheffield Hallam	SYK	YTH	LD	LD	20,710	51.2%	8,682	62.0%	5,110	12,028	20,710	438		1,331		369					441	40,427
Sheffield Heeley	SYK	YTH	Lab	Lab	18,405	54.0%	11,370	57.1%	18,405	4,987	7,035	775		1,312		1,314					265	34,093
Sheffield Hillsborough	SYK	YTH	Lab	Lab	23,477	54.7%	11,243	56.7%	23,477	3,890	12,234	1,273				2,010						42,884
Sherwood	NTT	EM	Lab	Lab	22,824	48.4%	6,652	62.8%	22,824	16,172	6,384	1,737										47,117
Shipley	WYK	YTH	Lab	Con	18,608	39.0%	422	69.7%	18,186	18,608	7,018			1,665		2,000					189	47,666
Shrewsbury and Atcham	SAL	WM	Lab	Con	18,960	37.7%	1,808	68.7%	17,152	18,960	11,487	1,349		1,138							210	50,296
Sittingbourne and Sheppey	KEN	SE	Lab	Lab	17,051	41.8%	79	53.7%	17,051	16,972	5,183	926									671	40,803
Skipton and Ripon	NYK	YTH	Con	Con	25,100	49.7%	11,620	72.6%	9,393	25,100	13,480	2,274									274	50,521
Sleaford and North Hykeham	LIN	EM	Con	Con	26,855	50.3%	12,705	66.8%	14,150	26,855	9,710	2,682										53,397
Slough	BRK	SE	Lab	Lab	17,517	47.2%	7,851	50.5%	17,517	9,666	5,739	1,415		759							1,999	37,095
Solihull	WMD	WM	Con	LD	20,896	39.9%	279	63.1%	8,058	20,617	20,896	990				1,752						52,313
Somerton and Frome	SOM	SW	LD	LD	23,759	43.9%	812	70.7%	5,865	22,947	23,759	1,047									484	54,102
South Antrim	NIR	NIR	UUP	DUP	14,507	38.2%	3,448	57.0%							14,507			4,407	11,059	4,706	3,278	37,957
South Cambridgeshire	CAM	E	Con	Con	23,676	45.0%	8,001	68.4%	10,189	23,676	15,675	1,556		1,552								52,648
South Derbyshire	DBY	EM	Lab	Lab	24,823	44.5%	4,495	65.6%	24,823	20,328	7,600					1,797					1,272	55,820
South Dorset	DOR	SW	Lab	Lab	20,231	41.6%	1,812	69.4%	20,231	18,419	7,647	1,571									716	48,584
South Down	NIR	NIR	SDLP	SDLP	21,557	44.7%	9,140	65.8%							8,815			12,417	4,775	21,557	613	48,177
South East Cambridgeshire	CAM	E	Con	Con	26,374	47.0%	8,624	65.3%	11,936	26,374	17,750											56,060
South East Cornwall	CUL	SW	LD	LD	24,986	46.7%	6,507	66.2%	6,069	18,479	24,986	2,693									1,228	53,455
South Holland and the Deepings	LIN	EM	Con	Con	27,544	57.1%	15,780	60.6%	11,764	27,544	6,244	1,950									747	48,249
South Norfolk	NFK	E	Con	Con	26,399	44.8%	8,782	68.7%	13,262	26,399	17,617	1,696										58,974
South Ribble	LAN	NW	Lab	Lab	20,428	43.0%	2,184	63.0%	20,428	18,244	7,634	1,205										47,511
South Shields	TWR	NE	Lab	Lab	18,269	60.5%	12,312	50.9%	18,269	5,207	5,957										773	30,206
South Staffordshire	STS	WM	Con	Con	13,343	52.0%	8,847	37.3%	4,496	13,343	3,540	2,675		437							1,144	25,635
South Suffolk	SFK	E	Con	Con	20,471	42.0%	6,606	71.8%	11,917	20,471	13,865	2,454										48,707
South Swindon	WIL	SW	Lab	Lab	17,534	40.3%	1,353	60.2%	17,534	16,181	7,322	955		1,234							246	43,472
South Thanet	KEN	SE	Lab	Lab	16,660	40.4%	664	65.0%	16,660	15,996	5,431	2,079		888							188	41,242
South West Bedfordshire	BDF	E	Con	Con	22,114	48.3%	8,277	61.8%	13,837	22,114	7,723	1,923									217	45,814
South West Devon	DEV	SW	Con	Con	21,906	44.8%	10,141	68.6%	11,545	21,906	11,765	3,669										48,885
South West Hertfordshire	HRT	E	Con	Con	23,494	46.9%	8,473	68.5%	10,466	23,494	15,021	1,107										50,088
South West Norfolk	NFK	E	Con	Con	25,881	46.9%	10,086	62.5%	15,795	25,881	10,207	2,738									506	55,127
South West Surrey	SRY	SE	Con	Con	26,420	50.4%	5,711	71.8%	4,150	26,420	20,709	958									172	52,409
Southampton Itchen	HAM	SE	Lab	Lab	20,871	48.3%	9,302	55.5%	20,871	11,569	9,162	1,623										43,225
Southampton Test	HAM	SE	Lab	Lab	17,845	42.7%	7,018	53.7%	17,845	10,827	10,368	1,261		1,482								41,783
Southend West	ESS	E	Con	Con	18,408	46.2%	8,959	61.9%	9,072	18,408	9,449	1,349									1,552	39,830
Southport	MSY	NW	LD	LD	19,093	46.3%	3,838	61.0%	5,277	15,255	19,093	749									827	41,201
Spelthorne	SRY	SE	Con	Con	21,620	50.5%	9,936	62.8%	11,684	21,620	7,318	1,968									239	42,829
St Albans	HRT	E	Lab	Con	16,953	37.3%	1,361	70.0%	15,592	16,953	11,561	707									649	45,462
St Helens North	MSY	NW	Lab	Lab	22,329	56.9%	13,962	57.8%	22,329	7,410	8,367	1,165										39,271
St Helens South	MSY	NW	Lab	Lab	19,345	54.5%	9,309	53.4%	19,345	4,602	10,036	847									643	35,473
St Ives	CUL	SW	LD	LD	25,577	50.7%	11,609	67.5%	6,583	13,968	25,577	2,551		1,738								50,417
Stafford	STS	WM	Lab	Lab	19,889	43.7%	2,121	64.7%	19,889	17,768	6,390	1,507										45,554
Staffordshire Moorlands	STS	WM	Lab	Lab	18,126	41.0%	2,438	64.0%	18,126	15,688	6,927	3,512										44,253
Stalybridge and Hyde	GTM	NW	Lab	Lab	17,535	49.7%	8,348	53.5%	17,535	9,187	5,532	573		1,088		1,399						35,314
Stevenage	HRT	E	Lab	Lab	18,003	42.9%	3,139	62.7%	18,003	14,864	7,610	1,305									152	41,934
Stirling	SCT	SCT	Lab	Lab	15,729	36.0%	4,767	67.7%	15,729	10,962	9,052	209	5,503	1,302							934	43,691
Stockport	GTM	NW	Lab	Lab	18,069	50.5%	9,163	54.5%	18,069	8,906	7,832	964										35,771
Stockton North	CLV	NE	Lab	Lab	20,012	54.9%	12,437	57.6%	20,012	7,575	6,869	986				986						36,428
Stockton South	CLV	NE	Lab	Lab	21,480	47.8%	6,139	63.0%	21,480	15,341	7,171	931										44,923
Stoke-on-Trent Central	STS	WM	Lab	Lab	14,760	52.9%	9,774	48.4%	14,760	4,823	4,986	914				2,178					246	27,907
Stoke-on-Trent North	STS	WM	Lab	Lab	16,191	52.6%	10,036	52.7%	16,191	6,155	4,561	696				2,132					1,025	30,760
Stoke-on-Trent South	STS	WM	Lab	Lab	17,727	46.9%	8,681	53.6%	17,727	9,046	5,894	1,043				3,305					805	37,820
Stone	STS	WM	Con	Con	22,733	48.3%	9,089	66.9%	13,644	22,733	9,111	1,548										47,036
Stourbridge	WMD	WM	Lab	Lab	17,089	41.0%	407	64.7%	17,089	16,682	6,850	1,087										41,708
Strangford	NIR	NIR	DUP	DUP	20,921	56.5%	13,049	54.0%		1,462					20,921			949	7,872	2,496	3,332	37,032
Stratford-on-Avon	WAR	WM	Con	Con	28,652	49.2%	12,184	68.8%	10,145	28,652	16,468	1,621		1,354								58,240
Streatham	LND	LND	Lab	Lab	18,950	46.7%	7,466	51.3%	18,950	7,238	11,484	396		2,245							302	40,615
Stretford and Urmston	GTM	NW	Lab	Lab	19,417	51.0%	7,851	61.5%	19,417	11,566	5,323	845									950	38,101
Stroud	GLS	SW	Lab	Lab	22,527	39.6%	350	71.3%	22,527	22,177	8,026	1,089		3,056								56,875
Suffolk Coastal	SFK	E	Con	Con	23,415	44.6%	9,685	67.9%	13,730	23,415	11,637	2,020		1,755								52,557
Sunderland North	TWR	NE	Lab	Lab	15,719	54.4%	9,995	47.5%	15,719	5,724	4,277					1,136					2,057	28,913
Sunderland South	TWR	NE	Lab	Lab	17,982	58.6%	11,059	49.3%	17,982	6,923	4,492					1,166					149	30,712
Surrey Heath	SRY	SE	Con	Con	24,642	51.5%	10,845	62.9%	7,989	24,642	13,797	1,430										47,858
Sutton and Cheam	LND	LND	LD	LD	19,768	47.1%	2,846	66.7%	4,954	16,922	19,768										288	41,932
Sutton Coldfield	WMD	WM	Con	Con	24,308	52.5%	12,283	63.5%	12,025	24,308	7,710	2,275										46,318
Swansea East	WGM	WLS	Lab	Lab	17,457	56.6%	11,249	53.6%	17,457	3,103	6,208	674		493		770	2,129					30,834
Swansea West	WGM	WLS	Lab	Lab	13,833	41.8%	4,269	56.7%	13,833	5,285	9,564	609		738			2,150				907	33,086
Tamworth	STS	WM	Lab	Lab	18,801	43.0%	2,569	61.0%	18,801	16,232	6,175	1,212									1,320	43,740
Tatton	CHS	NW	Con	Con	21,447	51.8%	11,731	64.6%	9,716	21,447	9,016	996									239	41,414
Taunton	SOM	SW	Con	LD	25,764	43.3%	573	69.7%	7,132	25,191	25,764	1,441										59,528
Teignbridge	DEV	SW	LD	LD	27,808	45.7%	6,215	68.7%	6,931	21,593	27,808	3,881									685	60,898
Telford	SAL	WM	Lab	Lab	16,506	48.3%	5,406	57.7%	16,506	11,100	4,941	1,659										34,206
Tewkesbury	GLS	SW	Con	Con	22,339	49.1%	9,892	63.2%	9,179	22,339	12,447			1,488								45,453
The Cotswolds	GLS	SW	Con	Con	23,326	49.3%	9,688	66.7%	8,457	23,326	13,638	1,538									392	47,351
The Wrekin	SAL	WM	Lab	Con	18,899	41.9%	942	67.0%	17,957	18,899	6,608	1,590										45,054
Thurrock	ESS	E	Lab	Lab	20,636	47.2%	6,375	54.9%	20,636	14,261	4,770	1,499				2,526						43,692
Tiverton and Honiton	DEV	SW	Con	Con	27,838	47.9%	11,051	69.8%	7,944	27,838	16,787	2,499		1,399							1,701	58,168
Tonbridge and Malling	KEN	SE	Con	Con	24,357	52.9%	13,352	67.3%	11,005	24,357	8,980	1,721										46,063
Tooting	LND	LND	Lab	Lab	17,914	43.1%	5,381	59.0%	17,914	12,533	8,110	424		1,695							892	41,568
Torbay	DEV	SW	LD	LD	19,317	40.8%	2,029	61.9%	6,972	17,288	19,317	3,726										47,303
Torfaen	GNT	WLS	Lab	Lab	20,472	56.9%	14,791	59.3%	20,472	5,681	5,678	1,145					2,242				761	35,979
Torridge and West Devon	DEV	SW	LD	Con	25,013	42.7%	3,236	70.2%	6,001	25,013	21,777	3,790		2,003								58,584
Totnes	DEV	SW	Con	Con	21,112	41.7%	1,947	67.7%	6,185	21,112	19,165	3,914									199	50,575
Tottenham	LND	LND	Lab	Lab	18,343	57.9%	13,034	47.8%	18,343	4,278	5,309			1,457							2,277	31,664
Truro and St Austell	CUL	SW	LD	LD	24,089	46.7%	7,403	64.2%	6,991	16,686	24,089	2,736									1,062	51,564
Tunbridge Wells	KEN	SE	Con	Con	21,083	49.6%	9,988	65.7%	8,736	21,083	11,095	1,568										42,482
Twickenham	LND	LND	LD	LD	26,696	51.6%	9,965	72.3%	5,868	16,731	26,696	766		1,445							181	51,687
Tyne Bridge	TWR	NE	Lab	Lab	16,151	61.2%	10,400	49.3%	16,151	2,962	5,751					1,072					447	26,383
Tynemouth	TWR	NE	Lab	Lab	20,143	47.0%	4,143	66.9%	20,143	16,000	6,716											42,859
Upminster	LND	LND	Con	Con	16,820	48.5%	6,042	63.0%	10,778	16,820	3,128	701		543		1,173					1,533	34,676
Upper Bann	NIR	NIR	UUP	DUP	16,679	37.6%	5,398	61.9%							16,679			9,305	11,281	5,747	1,310	44,322
Uxbridge	LND	LND	Con	Con	16,840	49.0%	6,171	59.4%	10,669	16,840	4,544	553		725		763					284	34,378
Vale of Clwyd	CON	WLS	Lab	Lab	14,875	46.0%	4,669	62.2%	14,875	10,206	3,820	375					2,309				728	32,313
Vale of Glamorgan	SGM	WLS	Lab	Lab	19,481	41.2%	1,808	68.9%	19,481	17,673	6,140	840					2,423				767	47,324
Vale of York	NYK	YTH	Con	Con	26,025	51.7%	13,712	66.3%	12,313	26,025	12,040											50,378
Vauxhall	LND	LND	Lab	Lab	19,744	52.9%	9,977	46.9%	19,744	5,405	9,767	271		1,705							461	37,353
Wakefield	WYK	YTH	Lab	Lab	18,802	43.3%	5,154	59.3%	18,802	13,648	7,063	467		1,297		1,328					776	43,381
Wallasey	MSY	NW	Lab	Lab	20,085	54.8%	9,109	57.5%	20,085	10,976	4,770	840										36,671
Walsall North	WMD	WM	Lab	Lab	15,990	47.8%	6,640	52.8%	15,990	9,350	4,144	1,182				1,992					770	33,428
Walsall South	WMD	WM	Lab	Lab	17,633	49.9%	7,946	58.4%	17,633	9,687	3,240	1,833				1,776					1,146	35,315
Walthamstow	LND	LND	Lab	Lab	17,323	50.3%	7,993	54.6%	17,323	6,254	9,330	810									727	34,444
Wansbeck	NBL	NE	Lab	Lab	20,315	55.2%	10,581	58.4%	20,315	5,515	9,734			1,245								36,809
Wansdyke	SOM	SW	Lab	Lab	20,686	40.6%	1,839	72.4%	20,686	18,847	10,050	1,129									221	50,933
Wantage	OXF	SE	Con	Con	22,354	43.0%	8,017	68.2%	12,464	22,354	14,337	798		1,332							646	51,931
Warley	WMD	WM	Lab	Lab	17,462	54.4%	10,147	57.1%	17,462	7,315	4,277	635				1,761					637	32,087
Warrington North	CHS	NW	Lab	Lab	21,632	53.5%	12,204	55.1%	21,632	9,428	7,699	1,086									573	40,418
Warrington South	CHS	NW	Lab	Lab	18,972	40.5%	3,515	61.8%	18,972	15,457	11,111	804									453	46,797
Warwick and Leamington	WAR	WM	Lab	Lab	22,238	40.6%	266	67.4%	22,238	21,972	8,119	921		1,534								54,784
Watford	HRT	E	Lab	Lab	16,575	33.6%	1,148	64.8%	16,575	14,634	15,427	1,292		1,466								49,394
Waveney	SFK	E	Lab	Lab	22,505	45.3%	5,915	64.4%	22,505	16,590	7,497	1,861		1,200								49,653
Wealden	SXE	SE	Con	Con	28,975	52.1%	15,921	67.7%	9,360	28,975	13,054	2,114		2,150								55,653
Weaver Vale	CHS	NW	Lab	Lab	18,759	47.6%	6,855	57.1%	18,759	11,904	7,723	1,034										39,420
Wellingborough	NTH	EM	Lab	Con	22,674	42.8%	687	66.5%	21,987	22,674	6,147	1,214									983	53,005
Wells	SOM	SW	Con	Con	23,071	43.6%	3,040	68.0%	8,288	23,071	20,031	1,575										52,965
Welwyn Hatfield	HRT	E	Lab	Con	22,172	49.6%	5,946	68.1%	16,226	22,172	6,318											44,716
Wentworth	SYK	YTH	Lab	Lab	21,225	59.6%	15,056	56.0%	21,225	6,169	4,800	1,604				1,798						35,596
West Aberdeenshire and Kincardine	SCT	SCT	LD	LD	19,285	46.3%	7,471	63.5%	5,470	11,814	19,285		4,700								379	41,648
West Bromwich East	WMD	WM	Lab	Lab	19,741	55.6%	11,652	58.6%	19,741	8,089	4,386	607				2,329					360	35,512
West Bromwich West	WMD	WM	Lab	Lab	18,951	54.3%	10,894	52.3%	18,951	8,057	3,583	870				3,456						34,917
West Chelmsford	ESS	E	Con	Con	20,446	42.8%	6,261	61.1%	14,185	20,446	11,197	693		837							442	47,800
West Derbyshire	DBY	EM	Con	Con	24,378	47.7%	10,753	69.2%	13,625	24,378	11,408	1,322									410	51,143
West Dorset	DOR	SW	Con	Con	24,763	46.5%	2,461	76.3%	4,124	24,763	22,302	1,084		952								53,225
West Dunbartonshire	SCT	SCT	New	Lab	21,600	51.9%	12,553	61.3%	21,600	2,679	5,999	354	9,047								1,910	41,589
West Ham	LND	LND	Lab	Lab	15,840	51.2%	9,801	49.8%	15,840	3,618	3,364	409		894							6,841	30,966
West Lancashire	LAN	NW	Lab	Lab	20,746	48.1%	6,084	57.7%	20,746	14,662	6,059	871									817	43,155
West Suffolk	SFK	E	Con	Con	21,682	49.0%	8,909	60.7%	12,773	21,682	7,573	2,177										44,205
West Tyrone	NIR	NIR	SF	SF	16,910	38.9%	5,005	72.7%							7,742			16,910	2,981	3,949	11,905	43,487
West Worcestershire	HWR	WM	Con	Con	20,959	44.5%	2,475	70.3%	4,945	20,959	18,484	1,590		1,099								47,077
Westbury	WIL	SW	Con	Con	24,749	44.5%	5,349	67.5%	9,640	24,749	19,400	1,815										55,604
Westmorland and Lonsdale	CMA	NW	Con	LD	22,569	45.5%	267	71.6%	3,796	22,302	22,569	660									309	49,636
Weston-super-Mare	AVN	SW	LD	Con	19,804	40.3%	2,079	65.5%	9,169	19,804	17,725	1,207				778					412	49,095
Wigan	GTM	NW	Lab	Lab	18,901	55.1%	11,767	53.3%	18,901	7,134	6,051	1,166									1,026	34,278
Wimbledon	LND	LND	Lab	Con	17,886	41.2%	2,301	68.1%	15,585	17,886	7,868	408		1,374							283	43,404
Winchester	HAM	SE	LD	LD	31,225	50.6%	7,476	71.9%	4,782	23,749	31,225	1,321									581	61,658
Windsor	BRK	SE	Con	Con	21,646	49.5%	10,292	65.4%	8,339	21,646	11,354	1,098		1,074							182	43,693
Wirral South	MSY	NW	Lab	Lab	16,892	42.5%	3,724	67.5%	16,892	13,168	8,568	616									460	39,704
Wirral West	MSY	NW	Lab	Lab	17,543	42.5%	1,097	67.5%	17,543	16,446	6,652	429									163	41,233
Witney	OXF	SE	Con	Con	26,571	49.3%	14,156	69.0%	11,845	26,571	12,415	1,356		1,682								53,869
Woking	SRY	SE	Con	Con	21,838	47.4%	6,612	63.4%	7,507	21,838	15,226	1,324									150	46,045
Wokingham	BRK	SE	Con	Con	22,174	48.1%	7,240	67.1%	6,991	22,174	14,934	994				376					603	46,072
Wolverhampton North East	WMD	WM	Lab	Lab	17,948	54.5%	8,156	54.4%	17,948	9,792	3,845	1,371										32,956
Wolverhampton South East	WMD	WM	Lab	Lab	16,790	59.4%	10,495	52.3%	16,790	6,295	3,682	1,484										28,251
Wolverhampton South West	WMD	WM	Lab	Lab	18,489	44.4%	2,879	62.1%	18,489	15,610	5,568	1,029				983						41,679
Woodspring	SOM	SW	Con	Con	21,587	41.8%	6,016	72.0%	11,249	21,587	15,571	1,269		1,309		633						51,618
Worcester	HWR	WM	Lab	Lab	19,421	41.9%	3,144	64.1%	19,421	16,277	7,557	1,113		921		980					119	46,388
Workington	CMA	NW	Lab	Lab	19,554	50.5%	7,895	64.7%	19,554	11,659	5,815	1,328									381	38,737
Worsley	GTM	NW	Lab	Lab	18,859	51.0%	9,368	53.1%	18,859	9,491	6,902	1,694										36,946
Worthing West	WSX	SE	Con	Con	21,383	47.6%	9,379	62.6%	8,630	21,383	12,004	2,374									515	44,906
Wrexham	CON	WLS	Lab	Lab	13,993	46.1%	6,819	63.3%	13,993	6,079	7,174					919	1,744				476	30,385
Wycombe	BKM	SE	Con	Con	20,331	45.8%	7,051	62.2%	13,280	20,331	8,780	1,735									301	44,427
Wyre Forest	HWR	WM	ICHC	ICHC	18,739	39.9%	5,250	64.2%	10,716	13,489		1,074									21,708	46,987
Wythenshawe and Sale East	GTM	NW	Lab	Lab	18,878	52.2%	10,827	50.4%	18,878	8,051	7,766	1,120									369	36,184
Yeovil	SOM	SW	LD	LD	25,658	51.4%	8,562	64.3%	5,256	17,096	25,658	1,903										49,913
Ynys Môn	GWN	WLS	Lab	Lab	12,278	34.6%	1,242	67.5%	12,278	3,915	2,418	367					11,036				5,448	35,462
Total for all constituencies								61.2%	9,554,734	8,780,918	5,977,588	606,370	412,267	284,251	241,856	190,178	174,838	174,530	127,314	125,626	483,854	27,134,234
Total for all constituencies								61.2%	35.2%	32.4%	22.0%	2.2%	1.5%	1.0%	0.9%	0.7%	0.6%	0.6%	0.5%	0.5%	1.9%	100.0%
Total for all constituencies								61.2%	Seats													
Total for all constituencies								61.2%	355	198	62	0	6	0	9	0	3	5	1	3	4	650
Total for all constituencies								61.2%	54.6%	30.5%	9.5%	0.0%	0.9%	0.0%	1.4%	0.0%	0.5%	0.8%	0.2%	0.5%	0.6%	100.0%

== See also ==
- Results of the 2010 United Kingdom general election
- Results of the 2015 United Kingdom general election
- List of political parties in the United Kingdom
- List of United Kingdom by-elections (1979–2010)
