= List of MPs for constituencies in Scotland (2005–2010) =

- Colours on map indicate the party allegiance of each constituency's elected member.

At the 2005 United Kingdom general election, Scottish constituencies elected 59 members of Parliament (MPs) to the House of Commons of the United Kingdom for the Fifty-fourth Parliament of the United Kingdom (2005 to 2010).

== Composition at election ==
Affiliation	Members
Labour Party	41
Liberal Democrats	11
Scottish National Party	6
Conservative Party	1
Total	59

== Composition at dissolution ==
Affiliation	Members
Labour Party	39
Liberal Democrats	12
Scottish National Party	7
Conservative Party	1
Total	59

== List ==
MP	Constituency	Party	Notes
Aberdeen North	Frank Doran	Labour	
Aberdeen South	Anne Begg	Labour	
Airdrie and Shotts	John Reid	Labour	
Angus	Mike Wier	SNP	
Argyll and Bute	Alan Ried	Liberal Democrats	
Ayr, Carrick and Cumnock	Sandra Osborne	Labour	
Banff and Buchan	Alex Salmond	SNP	
Berwickshire, Roxburgh and Selkirk	Michael Moore	Liberal Democrats	
Caithness, Sutherland and Easter Ross	John Thurso	Liberal Democrats	
Central Ayrshire	Brian Donohoe	Labour	
Coatbridge, Chryston and Bellshill	Tom Clarke	Labour	
Cumbernauld, Kilsyth and Kirkintilloch East	Rosemary McKenna	Labour	
Dumfries and Galloway	Russell Brown	Labour	
Dumfriesshire, Clydesdale and Tweeddale	David Mundell	Conservative	
Dundee East	Stewart Hosie	SNP	
Dundee West	Jim McGovern	Labour	
Dunfermline and West Fife	Rachel Squire	Labour	2006 By-election
East Dumbartonshire	Jo Swinson	Liberal Democrats	
East Kilbride, Strathaven and Lesmahagow	Adam Ingram	Labour	
East Lothian	Anne Moffat	Labour	
East Renfrewshire	Jim Murphy	Labour	
Edinburgh East	Gavin Strang	Labour	
Edinburgh North and Leith	Mark Lazarowicz	Labour Co-operative	
Edinburgh South	Nigel Griffiths	Labour	
Edinburgh South West	Alistair Darling	Labour	
Edinburgh West	John Barett	Liberal Democrats	
Falkirk	Eric Joyce	Labour	
Glasgow Central	Mohammed Sarwar	Labour	
Glasgow East	David Marshall	Labour	2008 By-election
Glasgow North	Ann McKechin	Labour	
Glasgow North East	Micheal Martin	Speaker	2009 By-election
Glasgow North West	John Robertson	Labour	
Glasgow South	Tom Harris	Labour	
Glasgow South West	Ian Davidson	Labour	
Glenrothes	John MacDougall	Labour	2008 By-election
Gordon	Malcolm Bruce	Liberal Democrats	
Inverclyde	David Cairns	Labour	
Inverness, Nairn, Badenoch and Strathspey	Danny Alexander	Liberal Democrats	
Kilmarnock and Loudoun	Des Browne	Labour	
Kirkcaldy and Cowdenbeath	Gordon Brown	Labour	Chancellor of the Exchequer (1997–2007), Prime Minister (2007–2010)
Lanark and Hamilton East	Jimmy Hood	Labour	
Linlithgow and East Falkirk	Michael Connarty	Labour	
Livingston	Robin Cook	Labour	2005 By-election
Midlothian	David Hamilton	Labour	
Moray	Angus Robertson	SNP	
Motherwell and Wishaw	Frank Roy	Labour	
Na h-Eileanan an Iar	Angus MacNeil	SNP	
North Ayrshire and Arran	Katy Clark	Labour	
North East Fife	Sir Menzies Campbell	Liberal Democrats	
Ochil and South Perthshire	Gordon Banks	Labour	
Orkney and Shetland	Alistair Carmichael	Liberal Democrats	
Paisley and Renfrewshire North	Jim Sheridan	Labour	
Paisley and Renfrewshire South	Douglas Alexander	Labour	
Perth and North Perthshire	Pete Wishart	SNP	
Ross, Skye and Lochaber	Charles Kennedy	Liberal Democrats	
Rutherglen and Hamilton West	Tommy MacAvoy	Labour Co-operative	
Stirling	Dame Anne McGuire	Labour	
West Aberdeenshire and Kincardine	Sir Robert Smith	Liberal Democrats	
West Dunbartonshire	John McFall	Labour	

== By-elections ==
- 2005 Livingstone By-election, Jim Divine, Labour
- 2006 Dunfermline and West Fife By-election, Willie Rennie, Liberal Democrats
- 2008 Glasgow East By-election, John Mason, SNP
- 2009 Glasgow North East By-election, Willie Bain, Labour

== See also ==
- Lists of MPs for constituencies in Scotland
