= List of Scottish National Party MPs =

This is a list of Scottish National Party MPs. It includes all members of Parliament elected to the House of Commons representing the Scottish National Party since the party's formation. Members of the Scottish Parliament or the European Parliament are not listed as they are separate entities.

Current members of Parliament are listed in bold.

== List of MPs ==
Name	Constituency	Period
Tasmina Ahmed-Sheikh	Ochil and South Perthshire	2015–2017
Richard Arkless	Dumfries and Galloway	2015–2017
Hannah Bardell	Livingston	2015–2024
**Lara Bird**	Arbroath and Broughty Ferry	2026–present
Mhairi Black	Paisley and Renfrewshire South	2015–2024
Ian Blackford	Ross, Skye and Lochaber	2015–2024
**Kirsty Blackman**	Aberdeen North	2015–present
Philip Boswell	Coatbridge, Chryston and Bellshill	2015–2017
Steven Bonnar	Coatbridge, Chryston and Bellshill	2019–2024
Deidre Brock	Edinburgh North and Leith	2015–2024
Alan Brown	Kilmarnock and Loudoun	2015–2024
Amy Callaghan	East Dunbartonshire	2019–2024
Lisa Cameron	East Kilbride, Strathaven and Lesmahagow	2015–2023
Douglas Chapman	Dunfermline and West Fife	2015–2024
Joanna Cherry	Edinburgh South West	2015–2024
Ronnie Cowan	Inverclyde	2015–2024
Douglas Crawford	Perth and East Perthshire	1974–1979
Angela Crawley	Lanark and Hamilton East	2015–2024
Roseanna Cunningham	Perth and Kinross	1995–1997
Roseanna Cunningham	Perth	1997–2001
Martyn Day	Linlithgow and East Falkirk	2015–2024
Martin Docherty-Hughes	West Dunbartonshire	2015–2024
Stuart Donaldson	West Aberdeenshire and Kincardine	2015–2017
**Dave Doogan**	Angus	2019–2024
**Dave Doogan**	Angus and Perthshire Glens	2024–present
Allan Dorans	Ayr, Carrick and Cumnock	2019–2024
Dick Douglas	Dunfermline West	1990–1992 ^{1}
Annabelle Ewing	Perth	2001–2005
Margaret Ewing	East Dunbartonshire	1974–1979 (as Margaret Bain)
Margaret Ewing	Moray	1987–2001
Winnie Ewing	Hamilton	1967–1970
Winnie Ewing	Moray and Nairn	1974–1979
Marion Fellows	Motherwell and Wishaw	2015–2024
Margaret Ferrier	Rutherglen and Hamilton West	2015–2017
Margaret Ferrier	Rutherglen and Hamilton West	2019–2020
Stephen Flynn	Aberdeen South	2019–2026
Stephen Gethins	North East Fife	2015–2019
Stephen Gethins	Arboath and Broughty Ferry	2024–2026
Patricia Gibson	North Ayrshire and Arran	2015–2024
Patrick Grady	Glasgow North	2015–2022, 2022–2024
Peter Grant	Glenrothes	2015–2024
Neil Gray	Airdrie and Shotts	2015–2021
Neale Hanvey	Kirkcaldy and Cowdenbeath	2019, 2020–2021
Douglas Henderson	East Aberdeenshire	1974–1979
Drew Hendry	Inverness, Nairn, Badenoch and Strathspey	2015–2024
Stewart Hosie	Dundee East	2005–2024
George Kerevan	East Lothian	2015–2017
Calum Kerr	Berwickshire, Roxburgh and Selkirk	2015–2017
**Chris Law**	Dundee West	2015–2024
**Chris Law**	Dundee Central	2024–present
**Graham Leadbitter**	Moray West, Nairn and Strathspey	2024–present
David Linden	Glasgow East	2017–2024
**Seamus Logan**	Aberdeenshire North and Moray East	2024–present
Iain MacCormick	Argyll	1974–1979
Margo MacDonald	Glasgow Govan	1973–1974
Kenny MacAskill	East Lothian	2019–2021
Stewart McDonald	Glasgow South	2015–2024
Stuart McDonald	Cumbernauld, Kilsyth and Kirkintilloch East	2015–2024
Callum McCaig	Aberdeen South	2015–2017
Natalie McGarry	Glasgow East	2015
Robert McIntyre	Motherwell	1945
Anne McLaughlin	Glasgow North East	2015–2017
Anne McLaughlin	Glasgow North East	2019–2024
John McNally	Falkirk	2015–2024
Angus MacNeil	Na h-Eileanan an Iar	2005–2023
John Mason	Glasgow East	2008–2010
Carol Monaghan	Glasgow North West	2015–2024
Paul Monaghan	Caithness, Sutherland and Easter Ross	2015–2017
Alasdair Morgan	Galloway and Upper Nithsdale	1997–2001
Roger Mullin	Kirkcaldy and Cowdenbeath	2015–2017
Gavin Newlands	Paisley and Renfrewshire North	2015–2024
John Nicolson	East Dunbartonshire	2015–2017
John Nicolson	Ochil and South Perthshire	2019–2024
**Brendan O'Hara**	Argyll and Bute	2015–2024
**Brendan O'Hara**	Argyll, Bute and South Lochaber	2024–present
Kirsten Oswald	East Renfrewshire	2015–2017
Kirsten Oswald	East Renfrewshire	2019–2024
Steven Paterson	Stirling	2015–2017
Anum Qaisar	Airdrie and Shotts	2021–2024
George Reid	Clackmannan and Eastern Stirlingshire	1974–1979
Angus Robertson	Moray	2001–2017
Alex Salmond	Banff and Buchan	1987–2010
Alex Salmond	Gordon	2015–2017
Tommy Sheppard	Edinburgh East	2015–2024
Jim Sillars	Glasgow Govan	1988–1992
Alyn Smith	Stirling	2019–2024
Christopher Stephens	Glasgow South West	2015–2024
Donald Stewart	Western Isles	1970–1987
John Swinney	North Tayside	1997–2001
Alison Thewliss	Glasgow Central	2015–2024
Michelle Thomson	Edinburgh West	2015
Richard Thomson	Gordon	2019–2024
Owen Thompson	Midlothian	2015–2017
Owen Thompson	Midlothian	2019–2024
George Thompson	Galloway	1974–1979
Hamish Watt	Banffshire	1974–1979
Michael Weir	Angus	2001–2017
Andrew Welsh	South Angus	1974–1979
Andrew Welsh	East Angus	1987–1997
Andrew Welsh	Angus	1997–2001
Eilidh Whiteford	Banff and Buchan	2010–2017
Philippa Whitford	Central Ayrshire	2015–2024
Corri Wilson	Ayr, Carrick and Cumnock	2015–2017
Gordon Wilson	Dundee East	1974–1987
**Pete Wishart**	North Tayside	2001–2005
**Pete Wishart**	Perth and North Perthshire	2005–present

== Graphical representation ==
Constituency	45	1945	67	1970	73	Feb 74	Oct 74	1979	1987	88	90	1992	95	1997	2001	2005	08	2010	2015	15	2017	2019	20	21	23		24	26
No. of SNP MPs	1	0	1	1	2	7	11	2	3	4	5	3	4	6	5	6	7	6	56	54	35	48	47	45	44	43	9	8
Motherwell / Motherwell and Wishaw (1997)	McIntyre																		Fellows									
Hamilton			W. Ewing																									
Western Isles / Na h-Eileanan an Iar				Stewart												MacNeil												
Glasgow Govan					MacDonald					Sillars																		
Dundee East / Arbroath and Broughty Ferry						G. Wilson										Hosie											Gethins	Bird
Banff / Banff and Buchan (1983)						Watt			Salmond									Whiteford									Logan	
Moray and Nairn / Moray (1983)						W. Ewing			M. Ewing						Robertson												Leadbitter	
Aberdeenshire E						Henderson																						
Stirlingshire E & Clackmannan / Ochil & S Perthshire (05)						Reid													Ahmed-Sheikh			Nicolson						
Argyll / Argyll and Bute (1983)						Maccormick													O'Hara									
Angus South / Angus East (1983) / Angus (1997)							Welsh		Welsh						Weir							Doogan						
Perth & E Perthshire / N Tayside (1983) / P & N P'shire (05) / P & Kinross-shire (24)							Crawford							Swinney	Wishart													
East Dunbartonshire							Bain												Nicolson			Callaghan						
Galloway / G and Upper Nithsdale (83) / Dumfries and G (05)							G. Thompson							Morgan					Arkless									
Dunfermline West / Dunfermline and West Fife (2005)											Douglas								Chapman									
Perth and Kinross / Perth (1997)													Cunningham		A. Ewing													
Glasgow E																	Mason		McGarry		Linden							
Inverness, Nairn, Badenoch and Strathspey																			Hendry									
Ross, Skye and Lochaber																			Blackford									
Aberdeen North																			Blackman									
Dundee West																			Law									
Falkirk																			McNally									
Glenrothes																			Grant									
North East Fife																			Gethins									
Airdrie and Shotts																			Gray					Qaisar				
Lanark & Hamilton East																			Crawley									
Cumbernauld, Kilsyth and Kirkintilloch East																			S. C. McDonald									
N Ayrshire & Arran																			Gibson									
Central Ayrshire																			Whitford									
West Dunbartonshire																			Docherty									
East Kilbride, Strathaven & Lesmahagow																			Cameron									
Glasgow NW																			C. Monaghan									
Glasgow South																			S. M. McDonald									
Glasgow Central																			Thewliss									
Glasgow North																			Grady									
Glasgow South West																			Stephens									
Inverclyde																			Cowan									
Kilmarnock and Loudoun																			Brown									
Paisley & Renfrewshire N																			Newlands									
Paisley & Renfrewshire S																			Black									
Edinburgh SW																			Cherry									
Linlithgow & E Falkirk																			Day									
Edinburgh E																			Sheppard									
Edinburgh North and Leith																			Brock									
Livingston																			Bardell									
W Aberdeenshire & Kincardine																			Donaldson									
Caithness, Sutherland and Easter Ross																			P. Monaghan									
Aberdeen South																			McCaig			Flynn						
Gordon																			Salmond			R. Thomson						
Stirling																			Paterson			Smith						
Kirkcaldy and Cowdenbeath																			Mullin			Hanvey						
Ayr, Carrick & Cumnock																			C. Wilson			Dorans						
Coatbridge, Chryston and Bellshill																			Boswell			Bonnar						
East Renfrewshire																			Oswald			Oswald						
Rutherglen & Hamilton W																			Ferrier			Ferrier						
Glasgow NE																			McLaughlin			McLaughlin						
Midlothian																			O. Thompson			O. Thompson						
East Lothian																			Kerevan			MacAskill						
Berwickshire, Roxburgh and Selkirk																			Kerr									
Edinburgh West																			M. Thomson									

== See also ==
- Scottish National Party
- List of MPs for constituencies in Scotland (2005–2010)
- List of MPs for constituencies in Scotland (2010–2015)
- List of MPs for constituencies in Scotland (2015–2017)
- List of MPs for constituencies in Scotland (2017–2019)
- List of MPs for constituencies in Scotland (2019–2024)
- List of MPs for constituencies in Scotland (2024–present)
- List of Scottish National Party MPs (2005–2010)
- List of Scottish National Party MPs (2010–2015)
