= Results of the 2010 United Kingdom general election =

== Results by parliamentary constituency ==
The results of the 2010 United Kingdom general election, by parliamentary constituency were as follows:

Constituency	Cnty	Rgn	Last elctn	Winning party				Turnout (Note: Excludes spoilt ballots)	Votes													
Constituency	Cnty	Rgn	Last elctn	Party	Votes	Share	Majrty	Turnout	Con (Note: Excludes Speaker)	Lab (Note: Includes Labour Party and allied Co-operative Party)	LD	UKIP	BNP	SNP	Grn (Note: Includes Green Party of England and Wales, Scottish Green Party and Green Party in Northern Ireland)	SF	DUP	PC	SDLP	UCU	Other (Note: Includes all other parties, all independent candidates and the Speaker)	Total
Aberavon	WGM	WLS	Lab	Lab	16,073	51.9%	11,039	60.9%	4,411	16,073	5,034	489	1,276					2,198			1,477	30,958
Aberconwy	CON	WLS	(Note: Constituency created in the 2007 boundary review)	Con	10,734	35.8%	3,398	67.2%	10,734	7,336	5,786	632						5,341			137	29,966
Aberdeen North	SCT	SCT	Lab	Lab	16,746	44.4%	8,361	58.2%	4,666	16,746	7,001		635	8,385							268	37,701
Aberdeen South	SCT	SCT	Lab	Lab	15,722	36.5%	3,506	67.2%	8,914	15,722	12,216		529	5,102	413						138	43,034
Airdrie and Shotts	SCT	SCT	Lab	Lab	20,849	58.2%	5,201	57.5%	3,133	20,849	2,898			8,441							528	35,849
Aldershot	HAM	SE	Con	Con	21,203	46.7%	5,586	63.5%	21,203	5,489	15,617	2,041									1,034	45,384
Aldridge-Brownhills	WMD	WM	Con	Con	22,913	59.3%	15,256	65.6%	22,913	7,647	6,833				847						394	38,634
Altrincham and Sale West	GTM	NW	Con	Con	24,176	48.9%	11,595	68.4%	24,176	11,073	12,581	1,563										49,393
Alyn and Deeside	CON	WLS	Lab	Lab	15,804	39.6%	2,919	65.5%	12,885	15,804	7,308	1,009	1,368					1,549				39,923
Amber Valley	DBY	EM	Lab	Con	17,746	38.6%	536	65.5%	17,746	17,210	6,636	906	3,195								265	45,958
Angus	SCT	SCT	SNP	SNP	15,020	39.6%	3,282	60.4%	11,738	6,535	4,090	577		15,020								37,960
Arfon	GWN	WLS		PC	9,383	36.0%	1,455	63.3%	4,416	7,928	3,666	685						9,383				26,078
Argyll and Bute	SCT	SCT	LD	LD	14,292	31.6%	3,341	67.3%	10,861	10,274	14,292			8,563	789						428	45,207
Arundel and South Downs	WSX	SE	Con	Con	32,333	57.8%	16,691	72.9%	32,333	4,835	15,642	3,172										55,982
Ashfield	NTT	EM	Lab	Lab	16,239	33.7%	192	62.3%	10,698	16,239	16,047	933	2,781								1,498	48,196
Ashford	KEN	SE	Con	Con	29,878	54.1%	17,297	67.9%	29,878	9,204	12,581	2,508			1,014							55,185
Ashton-under-Lyne	GTM	NW	Lab	Lab	18,604	48.4%	9,094	56.8%	9,510	18,604	5,703	1,686	2,929									38,432
Aylesbury	BKM	SE	Con	Con	27,736	52.2%	12,618	68.3%	27,736	6,695	15,118	3,613										53,162
Ayr, Carrick and Cumnock	SCT	SCT	Lab	Lab	21,632	47.1%	9,911	62.6%	11,721	21,632	4,264			8,276								45,893
Banbury	OXF	SE	Con	Con	29,703	52.8%	18,227	66.7%	29,703	10,773	11,476	2,806			959						524	56,241
Banff and Buchan	SCT	SCT	SNP	SNP	15,868	41.3%	4,027	59.8%	11,841	5,382	4,365		1,010	15,868								38,466
Barking	LND	LND	Lab	Lab	24,628	54.3%	16,555	61.4%	8,073	24,628	3,719	1,300	6,620		317						686	45,343
Barnsley Central	SYK	YTH	Lab	Lab	17,487	47.3%	11,093	56.5%	6,388	17,487	6,394	1,727	3,307								1,698	37,001
Barnsley East	SYK	YTH		Lab	18,059	47.0%	11,090	56.1%	6,329	18,059	6,969	1,731	3,301								1,997	38,386
Barrow and Furness	CMA	NW	Lab	Lab	21,226	48.1%	5,208	64.0%	16,018	21,226	4,424	841	840		530						245	44,124
Basildon and Billericay	ESS	E		Con	21,922	52.7%	12,338	63.4%	21,922	9,584	6,538	1,591	1,934									41,569
Basingstoke	HAM	SE	Con	Con	25,590	50.5%	13,184	67.1%	25,590	10,327	12,414	2,076									247	50,654
Bassetlaw	NTT	EM	Lab	Lab	25,018	50.5%	8,215	64.8%	16,803	25,018	5,570	1,779									407	49,577
Bath	AVN	SW	LD	LD	26,651	56.6%	11,883	70.6%	14,768	3,251	26,651	890			1,120						406	47,086
Batley and Spen	WYK	YTH	Lab	Lab	21,565	42.2%	4,406	66.6%	17,159	21,565	8,095		3,685		605							51,109
Battersea	LND	LND	Lab	Con	23,103	47.3%	5,977	65.7%	23,103	17,126	7,176	505			559						323	48,792
Beaconsfield	BKM	SE	Con	Con	32,053	61.1%	21,836	70.0%	32,053	6,135	10,271	2,597			768						666	52,490
Beckenham	LND	LND	Con	Con	27,597	57.9%	17,784	72.0%	27,597	6,893	9,813	1,551	1,001		608						223	47,686
Bedford	BDF	E	Lab	Con	17,546	38.9%	1,353	65.8%	17,546	16,193	8,957	1,136	757		393						120	45,102
Belfast East	NIR	NIR	DUP	APNI	12,839	37.2%	1,533	58.4%								817	11,306		365	7,305	14,695	34,488
Belfast North	NIR	NIR	DUP	DUP	14,812	40.0%	2,224	56.5%								12,588	14,812		4,544	2,837	2,212	36,993
Belfast South	NIR	NIR	SDLP	SDLP	14,026	41.0%	5,926	57.4%							1,036		8,100		14,026	5,910	5,114	34,186
Belfast West	NIR	NIR	SF	SF	22,840	71.1%	17,579	54.0%								22,840	2,436		5,261	1,000	596	32,133
Bermondsey and Old Southwark	LND	LND		LD	21,590	48.4%	8,530	57.5%	7,638	13,060	21,590		1,370		718						275	44,651
Berwickshire, Roxburgh and Selkirk	SCT	SCT	LD	LD	22,230	45.4%	5,675	86.6%	16,555	5,003	22,230	595		4,497							134	49,014
Berwick-upon-Tweed	NBL	NE	LD	LD	16,806	43.7%	2,690	52.1%	14,116	5,061	16,806	1,243	1,213									38,439
Bethnal Green and Bow	LND	LND	Resp	Lab	21,784	42.9%	11,574	62.4%	7,071	21,784	10,210		1,405		856						9,402	50,728
Beverley and Holderness	HUM	YTH	Con	Con	25,063	47.1%	12,987	67.1%	25,063	11,224	12,076	1,845	2,080		686						225	53,199
Bexhill and Battle	SXE	SE	Con	Con	28,147	51.6%	12,880	67.4%	28,147	6,524	15,267		1,950								2,699	54,587
Bexleyheath and Crayford	LND	LND	Con	Con	21,794	50.5%	10,344	66.4%	21,794	11,450	5,502	1,557	2,042		371						466	43,182
Birkenhead	MSY	NW	Lab	Lab	22,082	62.5%	15,395	56.3%	6,687	22,082	6,554											35,323
Birmingham Edgbaston	WMD	WM	Lab	Lab	16,894	40.6%	1,274	60.6%	15,620	16,894	6,387	732	1,196		469						273	41,571
Birmingham Erdington	WMD	WM	Lab	Lab	14,869	41.8%	3,277	53.5%	11,592	14,869	5,742	842	1,815								686	35,546
Birmingham Hall Green	WMD	WM	Lab	Lab	16,039	32.9%	4,051	63.6%	7,320	16,039	11,988	950									12,430	48,727
Birmingham Hodge Hill	WMD	WM	Lab	Lab	22,077	52.0%	10,302	56.6%	4,936	22,077	11,775	714	2,333								637	42,472
Birmingham Ladywood	WMD	WM	Lab	Lab	19,950	55.7%	10,105	48.7%	4,277	19,950	9,845	902			859							35,833
Birmingham Northfield	WMD	WM	Lab	Lab	16,841	40.3%	2,782	58.6%	14,059	16,841	6,550	1,363	2,290		406						305	41,814
Birmingham Perry Barr	WMD	WM	Lab	Lab	21,142	50.3%	11,908	59.0%	8,960	21,142	9,234	1,675									1,034	42,045
Birmingham Selly Oak	WMD	WM	Lab	Lab	17,950	38.5%	3,482	62.2%	14,468	17,950	10,371	1,131	1,820		664						159	46,563
Birmingham Yardley	WMD	WM	LD	LD	16,162	39.6%	3,002	56.5%	7,836	13,160	16,162	1,190	2,153								349	40,850
Bishop Auckland	DUR	NE	Lab	Lab	16,023	39.0%	5,218	60.2%	10,805	16,023	9,189	1,119	2,036								1,964	41,136
Blackburn	LAN	NW	Lab	Lab	21,751	47.8%	9,856	62.9%	11,895	21,751	6,918	942	2,158								1,835	45,499
Blackley and Broughton	GTM	NW		Lab	18,563	54.3%	12,303	49.2%	6,260	18,563	4,861	894	2,469								1,157	34,204
Blackpool North and Cleveleys	LAN	NW		Con	16,964	41.8%	2,150	61.5%	16,964	14,814	5,400	1,659	1,556								198	40,591
Blackpool South	LAN	NW	Lab	Lab	14,449	41.1%	1,852	55.8%	12,597	14,449	5,082	1,352	1,482								230	35,192
Blaenau Gwent	GNT	WLS	Ind (Note: 2006 by-election)	Lab	16,974	52.4%	10,135	61.8%	2,265	16,974	3,285	488	1,211					1,333			6,839	32,395
Blaydon	TWR	NE	Lab	Lab	22,297	49.6%	9,117	66.2%	7,159	22,297	13,180		2,277									44,913
Blyth Valley	NBL	NE	Lab	Lab	17,156	44.5%	6,688	61.3%	6,412	17,156	10,488	1,665	1,699								1,146	38,566
Bognor Regis and Littlehampton	WSX	SE	Con	Con	24,087	51.4%	13,063	66.2%	24,087	6,580	11,024	3,036	1,890								235	46,852
Bolsover	DBY	EM	Lab	Lab	21,995	50.0%	11,183	60.5%	10,812	21,995	6,821	1,721	2,640									43,989
Bolton North East	GTM	NW	Lab	Lab	19,870	45.9%	4,084	64.7%	15,786	19,870	5,624	1,815									182	43,277
Bolton South East	GTM	NW	Lab	Lab	18,782	47.4%	8,634	57.0%	10,148	18,782	6,289	1,564	2,012		614						195	39,604
Bolton West	GTM	NW	Lab	Lab	18,327	38.5%	92	66.7%	18,235	18,327	8,177	1,901			545						391	47,576
Bootle	MSY	NW	Lab	Lab	27,426	66.4%	21,181	57.8%	3,678	27,426	6,245	2,514	942								472	41,277
Boston and Skegness	LIN	EM	Con	Con	21,325	49.4%	12,426	64.2%	21,325	8,899	6,371	4,081	2,278								171	43,125
Bosworth	LEI	EM	Con	Con	23,132	42.6%	5,032	70.2%	23,132	8,674	18,100	1,098	2,458								812	54,274
Bournemouth East	DOR	SW	Con	Con	21,320	48.4%	7,728	61.9%	21,320	5,836	13,592	3,027									249	44,024
Bournemouth West	DOR	SW	Con	Con	18,808	45.1%	5,583	58.1%	18,808	6,171	13,225	2,999									456	41,659
Bracknell	BRK	SE	Con	Con	27,327	52.4%	15,704	67.8%	27,327	8,755	11,623	2,297	1,253		821						60	52,136
Bradford East	WYK	YTH		LD	13,637	33.7%	365	62.1%	10,860	13,272	13,637		1,854								834	40,457
Bradford South	WYK	YTH	Lab	Lab	15,682	41.3%	4,622	59.8%	11,060	15,682	6,948	1,339	2,651								315	37,995
Bradford West	WYK	YTH	Lab	Lab	18,401	45.3%	5,763	64.9%	12,638	18,401	4,732	812	1,370		940						1,683	40,576
Braintree	ESS	E	Con	Con	25,901	52.6%	16,121	69.1%	25,901	9,780	9,247	2,477	1,080		718							49,203
Brecon and Radnorshire	POW	WLS	LD	LD	17,929	46.2%	3,747	72.5%	14,182	4,096	17,929	876			341			989			432	38,845
Brent Central	LND	LND		LD	20,026	44.2%	1,345	61.2%	5,067	18,681	20,026				668						881	45,323
Brent North	LND	LND	Lab	Lab	24,514	46.9%	8,028	62.3%	16,486	24,514	8,879	380			725						1,314	52,298
Brentford and Isleworth	LND	LND	Lab	Con	20,022	37.2%	1,958	64.4%	20,022	18,064	12,718	863	704		787						607	53,765
Brentwood and Ongar	ESS	E	Con	Con	28,793	56.9%	16,921	73.0%	28,793	4,992	11,872	2,037	1,447		584						867	50,592
Bridgend	MGM	WLS	Lab	Lab	13,931	36.3%	2,263	65.3%	11,668	13,931	8,658	801	1,020					2,269				38,347
Bridgwater and West Somerset	SOM	SW		Con	24,675	45.3%	9,249	66.3%	24,675	9,332	15,426	2,604	1,282		859						315	54,493
Brigg and Goole	HUM	YTH	Lab	Con	19,680	44.9%	5,127	65.1%	19,680	14,533	6,414	1,749	1,498									43,874
Brighton Kemptown	SXE	SE	Lab	Con	16,217	38.0%	1,328	64.7%	16,217	14,889	7,691	1,384			2,330						194	42,705
Brighton Pavilion	SXE	SE	Lab	Grn	16,238	31.3%	1,252	70.0%	12,275	14,986	7,159	948			16,238						228	51,834
Bristol East	AVN	SW	Lab	Lab	16,471	36.6%	3,722	64.8%	12,749	16,471	10,993	1,510	1,960		803						531	45,017
Bristol North West	AVN	SW	Lab	Con	19,115	38.0%	3,274	68.5%	19,115	13,059	15,841	1,175			511						635	50,336
Bristol South	AVN	SW	Lab	Lab	18,600	38.4%	4,734	61.6%	11,086	18,600	13,866	1,264	1,739		1,216						606	48,377
Bristol West	AVN	SW	LD	LD	26,593	48.0%	11,366	66.9%	10,169	15,227	26,593	655			2,090						613	55,347
Broadland	NFK	E		Con	24,338	46.2%	7,292	72.7%	24,338	7,287	17,046	2,382	871		752							52,676
Bromley and Chislehurst	LND	LND	Con (Note: 2006 by-election)	Con	23,569	53.5%	13,900	67.3%	23,569	7,295	9,669	1,451	1,070		607						376	44,037
Bromsgrove	HWR	WM	Con	Con	22,558	43.7%	11,308	70.7%	22,558	11,250	10,124	2,950	1,923								2,825	51,630
Broxbourne	HRT	E	Con	Con	26,844	58.8%	18,804	64.0%	26,844	8,040	6,107	1,890	2,159								618	45,658
Broxtowe	NTT	EM	Lab	Con	20,585	39.0%	389	73.2%	20,585	20,196	8,907	1,194	1,422		423							52,727
Buckingham	BKM	SE	Con	Spkr	22,860	47.3%	30,553	64.5%				8,401	980								38,954	48,335
Burnley	LAN	NW	Lab	LD	14,932	35.7%	1,818	62.8%	6,950	13,114	14,932	929	3,747								2,173	41,845
Burton	STS	WM	Lab	Con	22,188	44.5%	6,304	66.5%	22,188	15,884	7,891	1,451	2,409									49,823
Bury North	GTM	NW	Lab	Con	18,070	40.2%	2,243	67.3%	18,070	15,827	7,645	1,282	1,825								312	44,961
Bury South	GTM	NW	Lab	Lab	19,508	40.4%	3,292	65.6%	16,216	19,508	8,796	1,017	1,743		493						494	48,267
Bury St Edmunds	SFK	E	Con	Con	27,899	47.5%	12,380	69.3%	27,899	9,776	15,519	3,003			2,521							58,718
Caerphilly	GNT	WLS	Lab	Lab	17,377	44.9%	10,755	62.3%	6,622	17,377	5,688	910	1,635					6,460				38,692
Caithness, Sutherland and Easter Ross	SCT	SCT	LD	LD	11,907	41.4%	4,826	60.9%	3,744	7,081	11,907			5,516							520	28,768
Calder Valley	WYK	YTH	Lab	Con	20,397	39.4%	6,431	67.3%	20,397	13,966	13,037	1,173	1,823		858						526	51,780
Camberwell and Peckham	LND	LND	Lab	Lab	27,619	59.2%	17,187	59.3%	6,080	27,619	10,432				1,361						1,167	46,659
Camborne and Redruth	CUL	SW		Con	15,969	37.6%	66	66.4%	15,969	6,945	15,903	2,152			581						943	42,493
Cambridge	CAM	E	LD	LD	19,621	39.1%	6,792	67.1%	12,829	12,174	19,621	1,195			3,804						507	50,130
Cannock Chase	STS	WM	Lab	Con	18,271	40.1%	3,195	61.1%	18,271	15,076	7,732	1,580	2,168								732	45,559
Canterbury	KEN	SE	Con	Con	22,050	44.8%	6,048	66.4%	22,050	7,940	16,002	1,907			1,137						173	49,209
Cardiff Central	SGM	WLS	LD	LD	14,976	41.4%	4,576	59.1%	7,799	10,400	14,976	765			575			1,246			390	36,151
Cardiff North	SGM	WLS	Lab	Con	17,860	37.5%	194	72.7%	17,860	17,666	8,724	1,130			362			1,588			300	47,630
Cardiff South and Penarth	SGM	WLS	Lab	Lab	17,262	38.9%	4,709	60.2%	12,553	17,262	9,875	1,145			554			1,851			1,129	44,369
Cardiff West	SGM	WLS	Lab	Lab	16,894	41.2%	4,751	65.2%	12,143	16,894	7,186	1,117			750			2,868				40,958
Carlisle	CMA	NW	Lab	Con	16,589	39.3%	853	64.7%	16,589	15,736	6,567	969	1,086		614						639	42,200
Carmarthen East and Dinefwr	DFD	WLS	PC	PC	13,546	35.6%	3,481	72.6%	8,506	10,065	4,609	1,285						13,546				38,011
Carmarthen West and South Pembrokeshire	DFD	WLS	Lab	Con	16,649	41.1%	3,423	69.7%	16,649	13,226	4,890	1,146						4,232			364	40,507
Carshalton and Wallington	LND	LND	LD	LD	22,180	48.3%	5,260	69.0%	16,920	4,015	22,180	1,348	1,100		355							45,918
Castle Point	ESS	E	Con	Con	19,806	44.0%	7,632	66.9%	19,806	6,609	4,232		2,205								12,174	45,026
Central Ayrshire	SCT	SCT	Lab	Lab	20,950	47.7%	12,007	64.2%	8,943	20,950	5,236			8,364							422	43,915
Central Devon	DEV	SW		Con	27,737	51.5%	9,230	75.7%	27,737	3,715	18,507	2,870			1,044							53,873
Central Suffolk and North Ipswich	SFK	E	Con	Con	27,125	50.8%	13,786	70.5%	27,125	8,636	13,339	2,361			1,452						507	53,420
Ceredigion	DFD	WLS	LD	LD	19,139	50.0%	8,324	63.9%	4,421	2,210	19,139	977			696			10,815				38,258
Charnwood	LEI	EM	Con	Con	26,560	49.6%	15,029	71.9%	26,560	10,536	11,531	1,799	3,116									53,542
Chatham and Aylesford	KEN	SE	Lab	Con	20,230	46.2%	6,069	64.5%	20,230	14,161	5,832	1,314	1,365		396						509	43,807
Cheadle	GTM	NW	LD (Note: 2005 by-election)	LD	24,717	47.1%	3,272	73.3%	21,445	4,920	24,717	1,430										52,512
Chelmsford	ESS	E		Con	25,207	46.2%	5,110	70.4%	25,207	5,980	20,097	1,527	899		476						407	54,593
Chelsea and Fulham	LND	LND		Con	24,093	60.5%	16,722	60.2%	24,093	7,371	6,473	478	388		671						382	39,856
Cheltenham	GLS	SW	LD	LD	26,659	50.5%	4,920	66.8%	21,739	2,703	26,659	1,192									493	52,786
Chesham and Amersham	BKM	SE	Con	Con	31,658	60.4%	16,710	74.6%	31,658	2,942	14,948	2,129			767							52,444
Chesterfield	DBY	EM	LD	Lab	17,891	39.0%	549	63.8%	7,214	17,891	17,342	1,432			600						1,360	45,839
Chichester	WSX	SE	Con	Con	31,427	55.3%	15,877	69.6%	31,427	5,937	15,550	3,873										56,787
Chingford and Woodford Green	LND	LND	Con	Con	22,743	52.8%	12,963	66.5%	22,743	9,780	7,242	1,133	1,288		650						270	43,106
Chippenham	WIL	SW		LD	23,970	45.8%	2,471	72.6%	21,500	3,620	23,970	1,783	641		446						425	52,385
Chipping Barnet	LND	LND	Con	Con	24,700	48.8%	11,927	67.4%	24,700	12,773	10,202	1,442			1,021						470	50,608
Chorley	LAN	NW	Lab	Lab	21,515	43.2%	2,593	70.1%	18,922	21,515	6,957	2,021									359	49,774
Christchurch	DOR	SW	Con	Con	27,888	56.4%	15,410	71.8%	27,888	4,849	12,478	4,201										49,416
Cities of London and Westminster	LND	LND	Con	Con	19,264	52.2%	11,076	55.2%	19,264	8,188	7,574	664			778						463	36,931
City of Chester	CHS	NW	Lab	Con	18,995	40.6%	2,583	66.7%	18,995	16,412	8,930	1,225			535						693	46,790
City of Durham	DUR	NE	Lab	Lab	20,496	44.3%	3,067	68.5%	6,146	20,496	17,429	856	1,153								172	46,252
Clacton	ESS	E		Con	22,867	53.0%	12,068	64.2%	22,867	10,799	5,577		1,975		535						1,370	43,123
Cleethorpes	HUM	YTH	Lab	Con	18,939	42.1%	4,298	64.0%	18,939	14,641	8,192	3,194										44,966
Clwyd South	CON	WLS	Lab	Lab	13,311	38.4%	2,834	64.5%	10,477	13,311	5,965	819	1,100					3,009				34,681
Clwyd West	CON	WLS	Con	Con	15,833	41.5%	6,419	65.8%	15,833	9,414	5,801	864						5,864			335	38,111
Coatbridge, Chryston and Bellshill	SCT	SCT	Lab	Lab	27,728	66.6%	20,714	59.4%	3,374	27,728	3,519			7,014								41,635
Colchester	ESS	E	LD	LD	22,151	48.0%	6,982	62.3%	15,169	5,680	22,151	1,350	705		694						390	46,139
Colne Valley	WYK	YTH	Lab	Con	20,440	37.0%	4,837	69.1%	20,440	14,589	15,603	1,163	1,893		867						741	55,296
Congleton	CHS	NW	Con	Con	23,250	45.8%	7,063	70.3%	23,250	8,747	16,187	2,147									449	50,780
Copeland	CMA	NW	Lab	Lab	19,699	46.0%	3,833	67.8%	15,866	19,699	4,365	994	1,474		389							42,787
Corby	NTH	EM	Lab	Con	22,886	42.2%	1,895	69.5%	22,886	20,991	7,834		2,525									54,236
Coventry North East	WMD	WM	Lab	Lab	21,384	49.3%	11,775	59.4%	9,609	21,384	7,210	1,291	1,863								2,026	43,383
Coventry North West	WMD	WM	Lab	Lab	19,936	42.8%	6,288	63.9%	13,648	19,936	8,344	1,295	1,666		497						1,174	46,560
Coventry South	WMD	WM	Lab	Lab	19,197	41.8%	3,845	62.4%	15,352	19,197	8,278	1,767			639						691	45,924
Crawley	WSX	SE	Lab	Con	21,264	44.8%	5,928	65.3%	21,264	15,336	6,844	1,382	1,672		598						408	47,504
Crewe and Nantwich	CHS	NW	Con (Note: 2008 by-election)	Con	23,420	45.8%	6,046	64.1%	23,420	17,374	7,656	1,414	1,043								177	51,084
Croydon Central	LND	LND	Con	Con	19,567	39.4%	2,909	65.1%	19,567	16,688	6,553	997	1,448		581						3,833	49,667
Croydon North	LND	LND	Lab	Lab	28,947	56.0%	16,481	60.6%	12,466	28,947	7,226	891			1,017						1,129	51,676
Croydon South	LND	LND	Con	Con	28,684	50.9%	15,818	69.3%	28,684	11,287	12,866	2,504			981							56,322
Cumbernauld, Kilsyth and Kirkintilloch East	SCT	SCT	Lab	Lab	23,549	57.2%	13,755	64.3%	3,407	23,549	3,924			9,794							476	41,150
Cynon Valley	MGM	WLS	Lab	Lab	15,681	52.5%	9,617	59.0%	3,010	15,681	4,120	1,001						6,064				29,876
Dagenham and Rainham	LND	LND		Lab	17,813	40.3%	2,630	63.4%	15,183	17,813	3,806	1,569	4,952		296						613	44,232
Darlington	DUR	NE	Lab	Lab	16,891	39.4%	3,388	62.9%	13,503	16,891	10,046	1,194	1,262									42,896
Dartford	KEN	SE	Lab	Con	24,428	48.8%	10,628	65.7%	24,428	13,800	7,361	1,842									2,649	50,080
Daventry	NTH	EM	Con	Con	29,252	56.5%	19,188	72.5%	29,252	8,168	10,064	2,333			770						1,187	51,774
Delyn	CON	WLS	Lab	Lab	15,083	40.8%	2,272	69.2%	12,811	15,083	5,747	655	844					1,844				36,984
Denton and Reddish	GTM	NW	Lab	Lab	19,191	51.0%	9,831	56.7%	9,360	19,191	6,727	2,060									297	37,635
Derby North	DBY	EM	Lab	Lab	14,896	33.0%	613	63.1%	14,283	14,896	12,638	829	2,000								434	45,080
Derby South	DBY	EM	Lab	Lab	17,851	43.3%	6,122	58.0%	11,729	17,851	8,430	1,821									1,357	41,188
Derbyshire Dales	DBY	EM		Con	24,378	52.1%	13,866	73.8%	24,378	9,061	10,512	1,779			772						278	46,780
Devizes	WIL	SW	Con	Con	25,519	55.1%	13,005	68.8%	25,519	4,711	12,514	2,076			813						707	46,340
Dewsbury	WYK	YTH	Lab	Con	18,898	35.0%	1,526	68.4%	18,898	17,372	9,150		3,265		849						4,474	54,008
Don Valley	SYK	YTH	Lab	Lab	16,472	37.9%	3,595	59.8%	12,877	16,472	7,422	1,904	2,112								2,633	43,420
Doncaster Central	SYK	YTH	Lab	Lab	16,569	39.7%	6,229	57.2%	10,340	16,569	8,795	1,421	1,762								2,858	41,745
Doncaster North	SYK	YTH	Lab	Lab	19,637	47.3%	10,909	57.9%	8,728	19,637	6,174	1,797	2,818								2,329	41,483
Dover	KEN	SE	Lab	Con	22,174	44.0%	5,274	70.1%	22,174	16,900	7,962	1,747	1,104								498	50,385
Dudley North	WMD	WM	Lab	Lab	14,923	38.7%	649	63.5%	14,274	14,923	4,066	3,267	1,899								173	38,602
Dudley South	WMD	WM	Lab	Con	16,450	43.1%	3,856	63.0%	16,450	12,594	5,989	3,132										38,165
Dulwich and West Norwood	LND	LND	Lab	Lab	22,461	46.6%	9,365	66.2%	10,684	22,461	13,096	707			1,266							48,214
Dumfries and Galloway	SCT	SCT	Lab	Lab	23,950	45.9%	7,449	70.0%	16,501	23,950	4,608	695		6,419								52,173
Dumfriesshire, Clydesdale and Tweeddale	SCT	SCT	Con	Con	17,457	38.0%	4,194	68.9%	17,457	13,263	9,080	637		4,945	510							45,892
Dundee East	SCT	SCT	SNP	SNP	15,350	37.8%	1,821	62.0%	6,177	13,529	4,285	431		15,350	542						254	40,568
Dundee West	SCT	SCT	Lab	Lab	17,994	48.5%	7,278	58.9%	3,461	17,994	4,233			10,716							722	37,126
Dunfermline and West Fife	SCT	SCT	LD (Note: 2006 by-election)	Lab	22,639	46.3%	5,470	66.5%	3,305	22,639	17,169	633		5,201								48,947
Dwyfor Meirionnydd	GWN	WLS		PC	12,814	44.3%	6,367	63.7%	6,447	4,021	3,538	776						12,814			1,310	28,906
Ealing Central and Acton	LND	LND		Con	17,944	38.0%	3,716	67.2%	17,944	14,228	13,041	765			737						485	47,200
Ealing North	LND	LND	Lab	Lab	24,023	50.4%	9,301	65.2%	14,722	24,023	6,283	685	1,045		505						415	47,678
Ealing Southall	LND	LND	Lab (Note: 2007 by-election)	Lab	22,024	51.5%	9,291	63.8%	12,733	22,024	6,383				705						911	42,756
Easington	DUR	NE	Lab	Lab	20,579	58.9%	14,982	54.7%	4,790	20,579	5,597	1,631	2,317									34,914
East Antrim	NIR	NIR	DUP	DUP	13,993	45.9%	6,770	50.7%								2,064	13,993		2,019	7,223	5,203	30,502
East Devon	DEV	SW	Con	Con	25,662	48.3%	9,114	72.6%	25,662	5,721	16,548	4,346			815							53,092
East Dunbartonshire	SCT	SCT	LD	LD	18,551	38.7%	2,184	75.2%	7,431	16,367	18,551	545		5,054								47,948
East Ham	LND	LND	Lab	Lab	35,471	70.4%	27,826	55.6%	7,645	35,471	5,849				586						822	50,373
East Hampshire	HAM	SE	Con	Con	29,137	56.8%	13,497	71.0%	29,137	4,043	15,640	1,477									1,020	51,317
East Kilbride, Strathaven and Lesmahagow	SCT	SCT	Lab	Lab	26,241	51.5%	14,503	66.6%	6,613	26,241	5,052			11,738	1,003						299	50,946
East Londonderry	NIR	NIR	DUP	DUP	12,097	34.6%	5,355	55.3%								6,742	12,097		5,399	6,218	4,494	34,950
East Lothian	SCT	SCT	Lab	Lab	21,919	44.6%	11,530	67.0%	9,661	21,919	8,288	548		7,883	862							49,161
East Renfrewshire	SCT	SCT	Lab	Lab	25,987	50.8%	10,420	77.3%	15,567	25,987	4,720	372		4,535								51,181
East Surrey	SRY	SE	Con	Con	31,007	56.7%	16,874	71.1%	31,007	4,925	14,133	3,770									805	54,640
East Worthing and Shoreham	WSX	SE	Con	Con	23,458	48.5%	11,105	65.4%	23,458	8,087	12,353	2,984			1,126						389	48,397
East Yorkshire	HUM	YTH	Con	Con	24,328	47.5%	13,486	64.0%	24,328	10,401	10,842	2,142	1,865		762						914	51,254
Eastbourne	SXE	SE	Con	LD	24,658	47.3%	3,435	67.0%	21,223	2,497	24,658	1,305	939								1,502	52,124
Eastleigh	HAM	SE	LD	LD	24,966	46.5%	3,864	69.3%	21,102	5,153	24,966	1,933									496	53,650
Eddisbury	CHS	NW	Con	Con	23,472	51.7%	13,255	63.0%	23,472	9,794	10,217	1,931										45,414
Edinburgh East	SCT	SCT	Lab	Lab	17,314	43.4%	9,181	65.4%	4,358	17,314	7,751			8,133	2,035						274	39,865
Edinburgh North and Leith	SCT	SCT	Lab	Lab	17,740	37.5%	1,724	68.4%	7,079	17,740	16,016			4,568	1,062						891	47,356
Edinburgh South	SCT	SCT	Lab	Lab	15,215	34.7%	316	73.8%	9,452	15,215	14,899			3,354	881							43,801
Edinburgh South West	SCT	SCT	Lab	Lab	19,473	42.8%	8,447	68.5%	11,026	19,473	8,194			5,530	872						367	45,462
Edinburgh West	SCT	SCT	LD	LD	16,684	35.9%	3,803	71.3%	10,767	12,881	16,684			6,115								46,447
Edmonton	LND	LND	Lab	Lab	21,665	53.7%	9,613	63.2%	12,052	21,665	4,252	1,036			516						856	40,377
Ellesmere Port and Neston	CHS	NW	Lab	Lab	19,750	44.6%	4,331	66.5%	15,419	19,750	6,663	1,619									782	44,233
Elmet and Rothwell	WYK	YTH		Con	23,778	42.6%	4,521	71.8%	23,778	19,257	9,109	1,593	1,802								250	55,789
Eltham	LND	LND	Lab	Lab	17,416	41.5%	1,663	67.0%	15,753	17,416	5,299	1,011	1,745		419						321	41,964
Enfield North	LND	LND	Lab	Con	18,804	42.3%	1,692	67.1%	18,804	17,112	5,403	938	1,228		489						479	44,453
Enfield Southgate	LND	LND	Con	Con	21,928	49.4%	7,626	69.1%	21,928	14,302	6,124	505			632						861	44,352
Epping Forest	ESS	E	Con	Con	25,148	54.0%	15,131	64.5%	25,148	6,641	10,017	1,852	1,982		659						285	46,584
Epsom and Ewell	SRY	SE	Con	Con	30,868	56.2%	16,134	68.8%	30,868	6,538	14,734	2,549									266	54,955
Erewash	DBY	EM	Lab	Con	18,805	39.5%	2,501	68.4%	18,805	16,304	8,343	855	2,337		534						464	47,642
Erith and Thamesmead	LND	LND	Lab	Lab	19,068	44.9%	5,703	60.8%	13,365	19,068	5,116	1,139	2,184		322						1,282	42,476
Esher and Walton	SRY	SE	Con	Con	32,134	58.9%	17,593	72.4%	32,134	5,829	13,541	1,783									1,256	54,543
Exeter	DEV	SW	Lab	Lab	19,942	38.2%	2,721	67.7%	17,221	19,942	10,581	1,930	673		792						1,108	52,247
Falkirk	SCT	SCT	Lab	Lab	23,207	45.7%	7,843	62.0%	5,698	23,207	5,225	1,283		15,364								50,777
Fareham	HAM	SE	Con	Con	30,037	55.3%	17,092	71.6%	30,037	7,719	12,945	2,235			791						618	54,345
Faversham and Mid Kent	KEN	SE	Con	Con	26,250	56.2%	17,088	67.8%	26,250	7,748	9,162	1,722			890						940	46,712
Feltham and Heston	LND	LND	Lab	Lab	21,174	43.6%	4,658	59.9%	16,516	21,174	6,679	992	1,714		530						931	48,536
Fermanagh and South Tyrone	NIR	NIR	SF	SF	21,304	45.5%	4	68.9%								21,304			3,574		21,925	46,803
Filton and Bradley Stoke	AVN	SW		Con	19,686	40.8%	6,914	70.0%	19,686	12,772	12,197	1,506	1,328		441						371	48,301
Finchley and Golders Green	LND	LND	Lab	Con	21,688	46.0%	5,809	66.7%	21,688	15,879	8,036	817			737							47,157
Folkestone and Hythe	KEN	SE	Con	Con	26,109	49.4%	10,122	67.7%	26,109	5,719	15,987	2,439	1,662		637						247	52,800
Forest of Dean	GLS	SW	Con	Con	22,853	46.9%	11,064	71.3%	22,853	11,789	10,676	2,522			923							48,763
Foyle	NIR	NIR	SDLP	SDLP	16,922	44.7%	4,824	57.5%								12,098	4,489		16,922	1,221	3,159	37,889
Fylde	LAN	NW	Con	Con	22,826	52.2%	13,185	66.3%	22,826	8,624	9,641	1,945			654							43,690
Gainsborough	LIN	EM	Con	Con	24,266	49.3%	10,559	67.5%	24,266	7,701	13,707	2,065	1,512									49,251
Garston and Halewood	MSY	NW		Lab	25,493	59.5%	16,877	60.1%	6,908	25,493	8,616	1,540									268	42,825
Gateshead	TWR	NE		Lab	20,712	54.1%	12,549	57.5%	5,716	20,712	8,163	1,103	1,787		379						397	38,257
Gedling	NTT	EM	Lab	Lab	19,821	41.1%	1,859	68.0%	17,962	19,821	7,350	1,459	1,598									48,190
Gillingham and Rainham	KEN	SE		Con	21,624	46.2%	8,680	66.1%	21,624	12,944	8,484	1,515	1,149		356						714	46,786
Glasgow Central	SCT	SCT	Lab	Lab	15,908	52.0%	10,551	50.9%	2,158	15,908	5,010	246	616	5,357	800						485	30,580
Glasgow East	SCT	SCT	SNP (Note: 2008 by-election)	Lab	19,797	61.6%	11,840	52.0%	1,453	19,797	1,617	209	677	7,957							454	32,164
Glasgow North	SCT	SCT	Lab	Lab	13,181	44.5%	3,898	57.5%	2,089	13,181	9,283		296	3,530	947						287	29,613
Glasgow North East	SCT	SCT	Lab (Note: 2009 by-election)	Lab	20,100	68.3%	15,942	49.1%	1,569	20,100	2,262		798	4,158							522	29,409
Glasgow North West	SCT	SCT	Lab	Lab	19,233	54.1%	13,803	58.3%	3,537	19,233	5,622		699	5,430	882						179	35,582
Glasgow South	SCT	SCT	Lab	Lab	20,736	51.7%	12,658	61.6%	4,592	20,736	4,739		637	8,078	961						351	40,094
Glasgow South West	SCT	SCT	Lab	Lab	19,863	62.5%	14,671	54.6%	2,084	19,863	2,870		841	5,192							931	31,781
Glenrothes	SCT	SCT	Lab (Note: 2008 by-election)	Lab	25,247	62.3%	16,448	59.8%	2,922	25,247	3,108	425		8,799								40,501
Gloucester	GLS	SW	Lab	Con	20,267	39.9%	2,420	64.0%	20,267	17,847	9,767	1,808			511						564	50,764
Gordon	SCT	SCT	LD	LD	17,575	36.0%	6,748	66.4%	9,111	9,811	17,575		699	10,827	752							48,775
Gosport	HAM	SE	Con	Con	24,300	51.8%	14,413	64.5%	24,300	7,944	9,887	1,496	1,004		573						1,735	46,939
Gower	WGM	WLS	Lab	Lab	16,016	38.4%	2,683	67.5%	13,333	16,016	7,947	652	963					2,760				41,671
Grantham and Stamford	LIN	EM	Con	Con	26,552	50.3%	14,826	67.7%	26,552	9,503	11,726	1,604	2,485								929	52,799
Gravesham	KEN	SE	Con	Con	22,956	48.5%	9,312	67.4%	22,956	13,644	6,293	2,265			675						1,470	47,303
Great Grimsby	HUM	YTH	Lab	Lab	10,777	32.7%	714	53.8%	10,063	10,777	7,388	2,043	1,517								1,166	32,954
Great Yarmouth	NFK	E	Lab	Con	18,571	43.1%	4,276	61.2%	18,571	14,295	6,188	2,066	1,421		416						100	43,057
Greenwich and Woolwich	LND	LND	Lab	Lab	20,262	49.2%	10,153	62.9%	10,109	20,262	7,498		1,151		1,054						1,114	41,188
Guildford	SRY	SE	Con	Con	29,618	53.3%	7,782	72.1%	29,618	2,812	21,836	1,021									280	55,567
Hackney North and Stoke Newington	LND	LND	Lab	Lab	25,553	55.0%	14,461	62.9%	6,759	25,553	11,092				2,133						924	46,461
Hackney South and Shoreditch	LND	LND	Lab	Lab	23,888	55.7%	14,288	58.8%	5,800	23,888	9,600	651			1,493						1,426	42,858
Halesowen and Rowley Regis	WMD	WM	Lab	Con	18,115	41.2%	2,023	69.0%	18,115	16,092	6,515	2,824									433	43,979
Halifax	WYK	YTH	Lab	Lab	16,278	37.4%	1,472	61.9%	14,806	16,278	8,335	654	2,760								722	43,555
Haltemprice and Howden	HUM	YTH	Con (Note: 2008 by-election)	Con	24,486	50.2%	11,602	69.4%	24,486	7,630	12,884		1,583		669						1,485	48,737
Halton	CHS	NW	Lab	Lab	23,843	57.7%	15,504	60.0%	8,339	23,843	5,718	1,228	1,563		647							41,338
Hammersmith	LND	LND		Lab	20,810	43.9%	3,549	65.6%	17,261	20,810	7,567	551	432		696						135	47,452
Hampstead and Kilburn	LND	LND		Lab	17,332	32.8%	42	65.7%	17,290	17,332	16,491	408	328		759						214	52,822
Harborough	LEI	EM	Con	Con	26,894	48.9%	9,797	70.5%	26,894	6,981	17,097	1,462	1,715								796	54,945
Harlow	ESS	E	Lab	Con	19,691	44.9%	4,925	64.9%	19,691	14,766	5,990	1,591	1,739								101	43,878
Harrogate and Knaresborough	NYK	YTH	LD	Con	24,305	45.7%	1,039	71.1%	24,305	3,413	23,266	1,056	1,094									53,134
Harrow East	LND	LND	Lab	Con	21,435	44.7%	3,403	68.1%	21,435	18,032	6,850	896			793							48,006
Harrow West	LND	LND	Lab	Lab	20,111	43.6%	3,143	67.3%	16,968	20,111	7,458	954			625							46,116
Hartlepool	NYK	NE	Lab	Lab	16,267	42.5%	5,509	55.5%	10,758	16,267	6,533	2,682	2,002									38,242
Harwich and North Essex	ESS	E		Con	23,001	46.9%	11,447	69.3%	23,001	9,774	11,554	2,527	1,065		909						170	49,000
Hastings and Rye	SXE	SE	Lab	Con	20,468	41.1%	1,993	64.7%	20,468	18,475	7,825	1,397	1,310								339	49,814
Havant	HAM	SE	Con	Con	22,433	51.1%	12,160	63.0%	22,433	7,777	10,273	2,611									809	43,903
Hayes and Harlington	LND	LND	Lab	Lab	23,377	54.8%	10,824	60.7%	12,553	23,377	3,726		1,520		348						1,113	42,637
Hazel Grove	GTM	NW	LD	LD	20,485	48.8%	6,371	67.4%	14,114	5,234	20,485	2,148										41,981
Hemel Hempstead	HRT	E	Con	Con	24,721	50.0%	13,406	68.0%	24,721	10,295	11,315	1,254	1,615								271	49,471
Hemsworth	WYK	YTH	Lab	Lab	20,506	46.8%	9,844	58.0%	10,662	20,506	5,667		3,059								3,946	43,840
Hendon	LND	LND	Lab	Con	19,635	42.3%	106	63.6%	19,635	19,529	5,734	958			518							46,374
Henley	OXF	SE	Con (Note: 2008 by-election)	Con	30,054	56.2%	16,588	73.2%	30,054	5,835	13,466	1,817	1,020		1,328							53,520
Hereford and South Herefordshire	HWR	WM		Con	22,366	46.2%	2,481	67.2%	22,366	3,506	19,885	1,638	986									48,381
Hertford and Stortford	HRT	E	Con	Con	29,810	53.8%	15,437	70.6%	29,810	7,620	14,373	1,716	1,297								561	55,377
Hertsmere	HRT	E	Con	Con	26,476	56.0%	17,605	64.7%	26,476	8,871	8,210	1,712	1,397		604							47,270
Hexham	NBL	NE	Con	Con	18,795	43.2%	5,788	72.0%	18,795	8,253	13,007		1,205								2,223	43,483
Heywood and Middleton	GTM	NW	Lab	Lab	18,499	40.1%	5,971	57.5%	12,528	18,499	10,474	1,215	3,239								170	46,125
High Peak	DBY	EM	Lab	Con	20,587	40.9%	4,677	70.4%	20,587	15,910	10,993	1,690			922						235	50,337
Hitchin and Harpenden	HRT	E	Con	Con	29,869	54.6%	15,271	74.1%	29,869	7,413	14,598	1,663			807						357	54,707
Holborn and St Pancras	LND	LND	Lab	Lab	25,198	46.1%	9,942	63.1%	11,134	25,198	15,256	587	779		1,480						215	54,649
Hornchurch and Upminster	LND	LND		Con	27,469	51.4%	16,371	68.0%	27,469	11,098	7,426	2,848	3,421		542						586	53,390
Hornsey and Wood Green	LND	LND	LD	LD	25,595	46.5%	6,875	69.9%	9,174	18,720	25,595				1,261						292	55,042
Horsham	WSX	SE	Con	Con	29,447	52.7%	11,460	72.0%	29,447	4,189	17,987	2,839			570						809	55,841
Houghton and Sunderland South	TWR	NE		Lab	19,137	50.3%	10,990	55.3%	8,147	19,137	5,292	1,022	1,961								2,462	38,021
Hove	SXE	SE	Lab	Con	18,294	36.7%	1,868	69.5%	18,294	16,426	11,240	1,206			2,568						85	49,819
Huddersfield	WYK	YTH	Lab	Lab	15,725	38.8%	4,472	61.1%	11,253	15,725	10,023		1,563		1,641						319	40,524
Huntingdon	CAM	E	Con	Con	26,516	48.9%	10,819	64.9%	26,516	5,982	15,697	3,258			652						2,161	54,266
Hyndburn	LAN	NW	Lab	Lab	17,531	41.1%	3,090	63.5%	14,441	17,531	5,033	1,481	2,137		463						1,586	42,672
Ilford North	LND	LND	Con	Con	21,506	45.7%	5,404	65.0%	21,506	16,102	5,966	871	1,545		572						456	47,018
Ilford South	LND	LND	Lab	Lab	25,301	49.4%	11,287	59.4%	14,014	25,301	8,679	1,132			1,319						746	51,191
Inverclyde	SCT	SCT	Lab	Lab	20,993	56.0%	14,416	63.4%	4,502	20,993	5,007	433		6,577								37,512
Inverness, Nairn, Badenoch and Strathspey	SCT	SCT	LD	LD	19,172	40.7%	8,765	64.9%	6,278	10,407	19,172	574		8,803	789						1,063	47,086
Ipswich	SFK	E	Lab	Con	18,371	39.1%	2,079	62.0%	18,371	16,292	8,556	1,365	1,270		775						312	46,941
Isle of Wight	IOW	SE	Con	Con	32,810	46.7%	10,527	63.9%	32,810	8,169	22,283	2,435	1,457		931						2,179	70,264
Islington North	LND	LND	Lab	Lab	24,276	54.5%	12,401	65.4%	6,339	24,276	11,875	716			1,348							44,554
Islington South and Finsbury	LND	LND	Lab	Lab	18,407	42.3%	3,569	64.4%	8,449	18,407	14,838	701			710						450	43,555
Islwyn	GNT	WLS	Lab	Lab	17,069	49.2%	12,215	63.2%	4,854	17,069	3,597	930	1,320					4,518			2,396	34,684
Jarrow	TWR	NE	Lab	Lab	20,910	53.9%	12,908	60.3%	8,002	20,910	7,163		2,709									38,784
Keighley	WYK	YTH	Lab	Con	20,003	41.9%	2,940	72.4%	20,003	17,063	7,059	1,470	1,962								135	47,692
Kenilworth and Southam	WAR	WM		Con	25,945	53.6%	12,552	75.2%	25,945	6,949	13,393	1,214			568						362	48,431
Kensington	LND	LND		Con	17,595	50.1%	8,616	53.3%	17,595	8,979	6,872	754			753						197	35,150
Kettering	NTH	EM	Con	Con	23,247	49.1%	9,094	68.8%	23,247	14,153	7,498		1,366								1,064	47,328
Kilmarnock and Loudoun	SCT	SCT	Lab	Lab	24,460	52.5%	12,378	62.8%	6,592	24,460	3,419			12,082								46,553
Kingston and Surbiton	LND	LND	LD	LD	28,428	49.8%	7,560	70.4%	20,868	5,337	28,428	1,450			555						473	57,111
Kingston upon Hull East	HUM	YTH	Lab	Lab	16,387	47.9%	8,597	50.6%	5,667	16,387	7,790	2,745									1,595	34,184
Kingston upon Hull North	HUM	YTH	Lab	Lab	13,044	39.2%	641	52.0%	4,365	13,044	12,403	1,358	1,443		478						200	33,291
Kingston upon Hull West and Hessle	HUM	YTH	Lab	Lab	13,378	42.5%	5,742	55.0%	6,361	13,378	7,636	1,688	1,416								1,026	31,505
Kingswood	AVN	SW	Lab	Con	19,362	40.4%	2,445	72.2%	19,362	16,917	8,072	1,528	1,311		383						333	47,906
Kirkcaldy and Cowdenbeath	SCT	SCT	Lab	Lab	29,559	64.5%	23,009	62.3%	4,258	29,559	4,269	760		6,550							406	45,802
Knowsley	MSY	NW		Lab	31,650	70.9%	25,686	56.1%	4,004	31,650	5,964	1,145	1,895									44,658
Lagan Valley	NIR	NIR	DUP	DUP	18,199	49.8%	10,871	56.0%								1,465	18,199		1,835	7,713	7,328	36,540
Lanark and Hamilton East	SCT	SCT	Lab	Lab	23,258	50.0%	13,478	62.3%	6,981	23,258	5,249	616		9,780							670	46,554
Lancaster and Fleetwood	LAN	NW		Con	15,404	36.1%	333	63.4%	15,404	15,071	8,167	1,020	938		1,888						213	42,701
Leeds Central	WYK	YTH	Lab	Lab	18,434	49.3%	10,645	46.0%	7,541	18,434	7,789		3,066								564	37,394
Leeds East	WYK	YTH	Lab	Lab	19,056	50.4%	10,293	58.4%	8,763	19,056	6,618		2,947								429	37,813
Leeds North East	WYK	YTH	Lab	Lab	20,287	42.7%	4,545	70.0%	15,742	20,287	9,310	842	758								596	47,535
Leeds North West	WYK	YTH	LD	LD	20,653	47.5%	9,103	66.5%	11,550	9,132	20,653	600	766		508						274	43,483
Leeds West	WYK	YTH	Lab	Lab	16,389	42.3%	7,016	57.5%	7,641	16,389	9,373	1,140	2,377		1,832							38,752
Leicester East	LEI	EM	Lab	Lab	25,804	53.8%	14,082	65.8%	11,722	25,804	6,817	725	1,700		733						494	47,995
Leicester South	LEI	EM	Lab	Lab	21,479	45.6%	11,413	61.1%	10,066	21,479	12,671	720	1,418		770							47,124
Leicester West	LEI	EM	Lab	Lab	13,745	38.4%	4,017	55.2%	9,728	13,745	8,107	883	2,158		639						559	35,819
Leigh	GTM	NW	Lab	Lab	21,295	48.0%	12,011	58.4%	9,284	21,295	8,049	1,535	2,724								1,445	44,332
Lewes	SXE	SE	LD	LD	26,048	52.0%	7,647	72.9%	18,401	2,508	26,048	1,728	594		729						80	50,088
Lewisham Deptford	LND	LND	Lab	Lab	22,132	53.7%	12,499	61.5%	5,551	22,132	9,633				2,772						1,132	41,220
Lewisham East	LND	LND	Lab	Lab	17,966	43.1%	6,216	63.3%	9,850	17,966	11,750	771			624						758	41,719
Lewisham West and Penge	LND	LND	Lab	Lab	18,501	41.1%	5,828	65.2%	11,489	18,501	12,673	1,117			931						317	45,028
Leyton and Wanstead	LND	LND	Lab	Lab	17,511	43.6%	6,416	63.2%	8,928	17,511	11,095	1,080	561		562						422	40,159
Lichfield	STS	WM	Con	Con	28,048	54.4%	17,683	71.0%	28,048	10,230	10,365	2,920										51,563
Lincoln	LIN	EM	Lab	Con	17,163	37.5%	1,058	62.2%	17,163	16,105	9,256	1,004	1,367								826	45,721
Linlithgow and East Falkirk	SCT	SCT	Lab	Lab	25,634	49.8%	12,553	63.6%	6,146	25,634	6,589			13,081								51,450
Liverpool Riverside	MSY	NW	Lab	Lab	22,998	59.3%	14,173	52.1%	4,243	22,998	8,825	674	706		1,355							38,801
Liverpool Walton	MSY	NW	Lab	Lab	24,709	72.0%	19,818	54.8%	2,241	24,709	4,891	898	1,104								492	34,335
Liverpool Wavertree	MSY	NW	Lab	Lab	20,132	53.1%	7,167	60.6%	2,830	20,132	12,965	890	150		598						349	37,914
Liverpool West Derby	MSY	NW	Lab	Lab	22,953	64.1%	18,467	56.7%	3,311	22,953	4,486	1,093									3,941	35,784
Livingston	SCT	SCT	Lab (Note: 2005 by-election)	Lab	23,215	48.5%	10,791	63.1%	5,158	23,215	5,316	443	960	12,424							391	47,907
Llanelli	DFD	WLS	Lab	Lab	15,916	42.5%	4,701	67.3%	5,381	15,916	3,902	1,047						11,215				37,461
Loughborough	LEI	EM	Lab	Con	21,971	41.6%	3,744	68.2%	21,971	18,227	9,675	925	2,040									52,838
Louth and Horncastle	LIN	EM	Con	Con	25,065	49.6%	13,871	65.0%	25,065	8,760	11,194	2,183	2,199								1,093	50,494
Ludlow	SAL	WM	Con	Con	25,720	52.8%	9,749	73.1%	25,720	3,272	15,971	2,127	1,016		447						179	48,732
Luton North	BDF	E	Lab	Lab	21,192	49.3%	7,520	65.5%	13,672	21,192	4,784	1,564	1,316		490							43,018
Luton South	BDF	E	Lab	Lab	14,725	34.9%	2,329	64.7%	12,396	14,725	9,567	975	1,299		366						2,888	42,216
Macclesfield	CHS	NW	Con	Con	23,503	47.0%	11,959	66.4%	23,503	10,164	11,544	1,418			840						2,590	50,059
Maidenhead	BRK	SE	Con	Con	31,937	59.5%	16,769	73.7%	31,937	3,795	15,168	1,243	825		482						270	53,720
Maidstone and The Weald	KEN	SE	Con	Con	23,491	48.0%	5,889	68.9%	23,491	4,769	17,602	1,637			655						774	48,928
Makerfield	GTM	NW	Lab	Lab	20,700	47.3%	12,490	59.3%	8,210	20,700	7,082		3,229								4,550	43,771
Maldon	ESS	E		Con	28,661	59.8%	19,407	69.6%	28,661	6,070	9,254	2,446	1,464									47,895
Manchester Central	GTM	NW	Lab	Lab	21,059	52.7%	10,439	44.3%	4,704	21,059	10,620	607	1,636		915						386	39,927
Manchester Gorton	GTM	NW	Lab	Lab	19,211	50.1%	6,703	50.5%	4,224	19,211	12,508				1,048						1,334	38,325
Manchester Withington	GTM	NW	LD	LD	20,110	44.7%	1,894	60.5%	5,005	18,216	20,110	698			798						204	45,031
Mansfield	NTT	EM	Lab	Lab	18,753	38.7%	6,012	60.4%	12,741	18,753	7,469	2,985	2,108								4,339	48,395
Meon Valley	HAM	SE		Con	28,818	56.2%	12,125	72.7%	28,818	3,266	16,693	1,490									971	51,238
Meriden	WMD	WM	Con	Con	26,956	51.7%	16,253	63.4%	26,956	10,703	9,278	1,378	2,511		678						658	52,162
Merthyr Tydfil and Rhymney	GNT	WLS	Lab	Lab	14,007	43.7%	4,056	58.6%	2,412	14,007	9,951	872	1,173					1,621			2,040	32,076
Mid Bedfordshire	BDF	E	Con	Con	28,815	52.5%	15,152	71.9%	28,815	8,108	13,663	2,826			773						712	54,897
Mid Derbyshire	DBY	EM		Con	22,877	48.3%	11,292	71.6%	22,877	11,585	9,711	1,252	1,698								219	47,342
Mid Dorset and North Poole	DOR	SW	LD	LD	21,100	45.1%	269	72.4%	20,831	2,748	21,100	2,109										46,788
Mid Norfolk	NFK	E	Con	Con	25,123	49.5%	13,856	68.4%	25,123	8,857	11,267	2,800	1,261		1,457							50,765
Mid Sussex	WSX	SE	Con	Con	28,329	50.7%	7,312	72.4%	28,329	3,689	20,927	1,423	583		645						259	55,855
Mid Ulster	NIR	NIR	SF	SF	21,239	52.0%	15,263	63.2%								21,239	5,876		5,826	4,509	3,392	40,842
Mid Worcestershire	HWR	WM	Con	Con	27,770	54.5%	15,864	70.6%	27,770	7,613	11,906	3,049			593							50,931
Middlesbrough	NYK	NE	Lab	Lab	15,351	45.9%	8,689	51.4%	6,283	15,351	6,662	1,236	1,954								1,969	33,455
Middlesbrough South and East Cleveland	NYK	NE	Lab	Lab	18,138	39.2%	1,677	63.6%	16,461	18,138	7,340	1,881	1,576								818	46,214
Midlothian	SCT	SCT	Lab	Lab	18,449	47.0%	10,349	63.9%	4,661	18,449	6,711	364		8,100	595						362	39,242
Milton Keynes North	BKM	SE		Con	23,419	43.5%	8,961	65.4%	23,419	14,458	11,894	1,772	1,154		733						458	53,888
Milton Keynes South	BKM	SE		Con	23,034	41.6%	8,576	63.9%	23,034	17,833	9,787	2,074	1,502		774						329	55,333
Mitcham and Morden	LND	LND	Lab	Lab	24,722	56.4%	13,666	66.4%	11,056	24,722	5,202	857	1,386		381						193	43,797
Mole Valley	SRY	SE	Con	Con	31,263	57.5%	15,653	75.1%	31,263	3,804	15,610	2,752			895							54,324
Monmouth	GNT	WLS	Con	Con	22,466	48.3%	10,425	72.1%	22,466	12,041	9,026	1,126			587			1,273				46,519
Montgomeryshire	POW	WLS	LD	Con	13,976	41.3%	1,184	69.4%	13,976	2,407	12,792	1,128						2,802			708	33,813
Moray	SCT	SCT	SNP	SNP	16,273	39.7%	5,590	62.2%	10,683	7,007	5,956	1,085		16,273								41,004
Morecambe and Lunesdale	LAN	NW	Lab	Con	18,035	41.5%	866	62.4%	18,035	17,169	5,791	1,843			598							43,436
Morley and Outwood	WYK	YTH		Lab	18,365	37.6%	1,101	65.2%	17,264	18,365	8,186	1,506	3,535									48,856
Motherwell and Wishaw	SCT	SCT	Lab	Lab	23,910	61.1%	16,806	58.5%	3,660	23,910	3,840			7,104							609	39,123
Na h-Eileanan an Iar	SCT	SCT	SNP	SNP	6,723	45.7%	1,885	67.6%	647	4,838	1,097			6,723							1,412	14,717
Neath	WGM	WLS	Lab	Lab	17,172	46.3%	9,775	64.8%	4,847	17,172	5,535	829	1,342					7,397				37,122
New Forest East	HAM	SE	Con	Con	26,443	52.8%	11,307	68.7%	26,443	4,915	15,136	2,518			1,024							50,036
New Forest West	HAM	SE	Con	Con	27,980	58.8%	16,896	69.6%	27,980	4,666	11,084	2,783			1,059							47,572
Newark	NTT	EM	Con	Con	27,590	53.9%	16,152	71.4%	27,590	11,438	10,246	1,954										51,228
Newbury	BRK	SE	Con	Con	33,057	56.4%	12,248	74.0%	33,057	2,505	20,809	1,475			490						253	58,589
Newcastle upon Tyne Central	TWR	NE	Lab	Lab	15,694	45.9%	7,466	53.0%	6,611	15,694	8,228	754	2,302		568							34,157
Newcastle upon Tyne East	TWR	NE		Lab	17,043	45.0%	4,453	56.4%	6,068	17,043	12,590		1,342		620						177	37,840
Newcastle upon Tyne North	TWR	NE	Lab	Lab	17,950	40.8%	3,414	63.3%	7,966	17,950	14,536	1,285	1,890		319							43,946
Newcastle-under-Lyme	STS	WM	Lab	Lab	16,393	38.0%	1,552	71.4%	14,841	16,393	8,466	3,491										43,191
Newport East	GNT	WLS	Lab	Lab	12,744	37.0%	1,650	63.3%	7,918	12,744	11,094	677	1,168					724			123	34,448
Newport West	GNT	WLS	Lab	Lab	16,389	41.3%	3,544	64.0%	12,845	16,389	6,587	1,144	1,183		450			1,122				39,720
Newry and Armagh	NIR	NIR	SF	SF	18,857	42.0%	8,331	60.4%								18,857	5,764		10,526	8,558	1,201	44,906
Newton Abbot	DEV	SW		Con	20,774	43.0%	523	69.7%	20,774	3,387	20,251	3,088			701						82	48,283
Normanton, Pontefract and Castleford	WYK	YTH		Lab	22,293	48.2%	10,979	56.2%	11,314	22,293	7,585		3,864								1,183	46,239
North Antrim	NIR	NIR	DUP	DUP	19,672	46.4%	10,584	57.8%								5,265	19,672		3,738	4,634	9,088	42,397
North Ayrshire and Arran	SCT	SCT	Lab	Lab	21,860	47.4%	9,895	62.1%	7,212	21,860	4,630			11,965							449	46,116
North Cornwall	CUL	SW	LD	LD	22,512	48.1%	2,981	68.9%	19,531	1,971	22,512	2,300									530	46,844
North Devon	DEV	SW	LD	LD	24,305	47.4%	5,821	68.9%	18,484	2,671	24,305	3,720	614		697						830	51,321
North Dorset	DOR	SW	Con	Con	27,640	51.1%	7,625	73.4%	27,640	2,910	20,015	2,812			546						218	54,141
North Down	NIR	NIR	UUP	Ind	21,181	63.3%	14,364	55.2%							1,043	250			680	6,817	24,691	33,481
North Durham	DUR	NE	Lab	Lab	20,698	50.5%	12,076	58.2%	8,622	20,698	8,617	1,344	1,686									40,967
North East Bedfordshire	BDF	E	Con	Con	30,989	55.8%	18,942	71.2%	30,989	8,957	12,047	2,294	1,265									55,552
North East Cambridgeshire	CAM	E	Con	Con	26,862	51.6%	16,425	71.1%	26,862	9,274	10,437	2,791	1,747								953	52,064
North East Derbyshire	DBY	EM	Lab	Lab	17,948	38.2%	2,445	65.9%	15,503	17,948	10,947	2,636										47,034
North East Fife	SCT	SCT	LD	LD	17,763	44.3%	9,048	63.8%	8,715	6,869	17,763	1,032		5,685								40,064
North East Hampshire	HAM	SE	Con	Con	32,075	60.6%	18,597	73.3%	32,075	5,173	13,478	2,213										52,939
North East Hertfordshire	HRT	E	Con	Con	26,995	53.5%	15,194	69.8%	26,995	8,291	11,801	2,075			875						388	50,425
North East Somerset	AVN	SW		Con	21,130	41.3%	4,914	68.7%	21,130	16,216	11,433	1,754			670							51,203
North Herefordshire	HWR	WM		Con	24,631	51.8%	9,887	71.1%	24,631	3,373	14,744	2,701			1,533						586	47,568
North Norfolk	NFK	E	LD	LD	27,554	55.5%	11,626	73.2%	15,928	2,896	27,554	2,680			508						95	49,661
North Shropshire	SAL	WM	Con	Con	26,692	51.5%	15,828	68.0%	26,692	9,406	10,864	2,432	1,667		808							51,869
North Somerset	AVN	SW		Con	28,549	49.3%	7,862	90.4%	28,549	6,448	20,687	2,257										57,941
North Swindon	WIL	SW	Lab	Con	22,408	44.6%	7,060	64.2%	22,408	15,348	8,668	1,842	1,542		487							50,295
North Thanet	KEN	SE	Con	Con	22,826	52.7%	13,528	63.2%	22,826	9,298	8,400	2,819										43,343
North Tyneside	TWR	NE	Lab	Lab	23,505	50.7%	12,884	59.7%	8,514	23,505	10,621	1,306	1,860								599	46,405
North Warwickshire	WAR	WM	Lab	Con	18,993	40.2%	54	67.4%	18,993	18,939	5,481	1,335	2,106								411	47,265
North West Cambridgeshire	CAM	E	Con	Con	29,425	50.5%	16,677	65.6%	29,425	9,877	12,748	4,826									1,407	58,283
North West Durham	DUR	NE	Lab	Lab	18,539	42.3%	7,612	63.7%	8,766	18,539	10,927	1,259	1,852								2,472	43,815
North West Hampshire	HAM	SE	Con	Con	31,072	58.3%	18,583	69.5%	31,072	6,980	12,489	2,751										53,292
North West Leicestershire	LEI	EM	Lab	Con	23,147	44.6%	7,511	72.9%	23,147	15,636	8,639	1,134	3,396									51,952
North West Norfolk	NFK	E	Con	Con	25,916	54.2%	14,810	65.4%	25,916	6,353	11,106	1,841	1,839		745							47,800
North Wiltshire	WIL	SW	Con	Con	25,114	51.6%	7,483	73.4%	25,114	3,239	17,631	1,908			599						208	48,699
Northampton North	NTH	EM	Lab	Con	13,735	34.1%	1,936	65.1%	13,735	11,799	11,250	1,238	1,316		443						490	40,271
Northampton South	NTH	EM	Con	Con	15,917	40.8%	6,004	61.8%	15,917	9,913	7,579	1,897			363						3,309	38,978
Norwich North	NFK	E	Con (Note: 2009 by-election)	Con	17,280	40.6%	3,901	65.7%	17,280	13,379	7,783	1,878	747		1,245						261	42,573
Norwich South	NFK	E	Lab	LD	13,960	29.4%	310	64.6%	10,902	13,650	13,960	1,145	697		7,095						102	47,551
Nottingham East	NTT	EM	Lab	Lab	15,022	45.4%	6,969	56.4%	7,846	15,022	8,053	1,138			928						125	33,112
Nottingham North	NTT	EM	Lab	Lab	16,646	48.6%	8,138	54.2%	8,508	16,646	5,849	1,338	1,944									34,285
Nottingham South	NTT	EM	Lab	Lab	15,209	37.3%	1,772	60.5%	13,437	15,209	9,406	967	1,140		630							40,789
Nuneaton	WAR	WM	Lab	Con	18,536	41.5%	2,069	65.8%	18,536	16,467	6,846		2,797									44,646
Ochil and South Perthshire	SCT	SCT	Lab	Lab	19,131	37.9%	5,187	67.2%	10,342	19,131	5,754	689		13,944	609							50,469
Ogmore	MGM	WLS	Lab	Lab	18,644	53.8%	13,246	62.4%	5,398	18,644	5,260	780	1,242					3,326				34,650
Old Bexley and Sidcup	LND	LND	Con	Con	24,625	54.1%	15,857	69.2%	24,625	8,768	6,996	1,532	2,132		371						1,068	45,492
Oldham East and Saddleworth	GTM	NW	Lab	Lab	14,186	31.9%	103	61.4%	11,773	14,186	14,083	1,720	2,546								212	44,520
Oldham West and Royton	GTM	NW	Lab	Lab	19,503	45.5%	9,352	59.3%	10,151	19,503	8,193	1,387	3,049								627	42,910
Orkney and Shetland	SCT	SCT	LD	LD	11,989	62.0%	9,982	58.5%	2,032	2,061	11,989	1,222		2,042								19,346
Orpington	LND	LND	Con	Con	29,200	59.7%	17,200	72.2%	29,200	4,400	12,000	1,360	1,241		511						199	48,911
Oxford East	OXF	SE	Lab	Lab	21,938	42.5%	4,581	63.1%	9,727	21,938	17,357	1,202			1,238						189	51,651
Oxford West and Abingdon	OXF	SE	LD	Con	23,906	42.3%	176	65.3%	23,906	5,999	23,730	1,518			1,184						143	56,480
Paisley and Renfrewshire North	SCT	SCT	Lab	Lab	23,613	54.0%	15,280	68.6%	6,381	23,613	4,597			8,333							783	43,707
Paisley and Renfrewshire South	SCT	SCT	Lab	Lab	23,842	59.6%	16,614	65.4%	3,979	23,842	3,812			7,228							1,137	39,998
Pendle	LAN	NW	Lab	Con	17,512	38.9%	3,585	67.8%	17,512	13,927	9,095	1,476	2,894								141	45,045
Penistone and Stocksbridge	SYK	YTH		Lab	17,565	37.8%	3,049	67.9%	14,516	17,565	9,800	1,936	2,207								492	46,516
Penrith and The Border	CMA	NW	Con	Con	24,071	53.4%	11,241	69.9%	24,071	5,834	12,830	1,259	1,093									45,087
Perth and North Perthshire	SCT	SCT	SNP	SNP	19,118	39.6%	4,379	66.9%	14,739	7,923	5,954			19,118							534	48,268
Peterborough	CAM	E	Con	Con	18,133	40.4%	4,861	63.9%	18,133	13,272	8,816	3,007			523						1,176	44,927
Plymouth Moor View	DEV	SW		Lab	15,433	37.2%	1,588	61.0%	13,845	15,433	7,016	3,188	1,438		398						208	41,526
Plymouth Sutton and Devonport	DEV	SW		Con	15,050	34.3%	1,149	60.2%	15,050	13,901	10,829	2,854			904						356	43,894
Pontypridd	MGM	WLS	Lab	Lab	14,220	38.8%	2,785	63.0%	5,932	14,220	11,435	1,229			361			2,673			821	36,671
Poole	DOR	SW	Con	Con	22,532	47.5%	7,541	65.3%	22,532	6,041	14,991	2,507	1,188								177	47,436
Poplar and Limehouse	LND	LND		Lab	18,679	40.0%	6,030	62.3%	12,649	18,679	5,209	565			449						9,149	46,700
Portsmouth North	HAM	SE	Lab	Con	19,533	44.3%	7,289	62.7%	19,533	12,244	8,874	1,812			461						1,194	44,118
Portsmouth South	HAM	SE	LD	LD	18,921	45.9%	5,200	58.7%	13,721	5,640	18,921	876	873		716						517	41,264
Preseli Pembrokeshire	DFD	WLS	Con	Con	16,944	42.8%	4,605	69.0%	16,944	12,339	5,759	906						3,654				39,602
Preston	LAN	NW	Lab	Lab	15,668	48.2%	7,733	53.1%	7,060	15,668	7,935	1,462									380	32,505
Pudsey	WYK	YTH	Lab	Con	18,874	38.5%	1,659	70.9%	18,874	17,215	10,224	1,221	1,549									49,083
Putney	LND	LND	Con	Con	21,223	52.0%	10,053	64.4%	21,223	11,170	6,907	435	459		591							40,785
Rayleigh and Wickford	ESS	E		Con	30,257	57.8%	22,338	69.2%	30,257	7,577	7,919	2,211	2,160								2,219	52,343
Reading East	BRK	SE	Con	Con	21,269	42.6%	7,605	66.7%	21,269	12,729	13,664	1,086			1,069						168	49,985
Reading West	BRK	SE	Lab	Con	20,523	43.2%	6,004	65.9%	20,523	14,519	9,546	1,508			582						852	47,530
Redcar	NYK	NE	Lab	LD	18,955	45.2%	5,214	62.5%	5,790	13,741	18,955	1,875	1,475								127	41,963
Redditch	HWR	WM	Lab	Con	19,138	43.5%	5,821	66.1%	19,138	13,317	7,750	1,497	1,394		393						529	44,018
Reigate	SRY	SE	Con	Con	26,688	53.4%	13,591	69.8%	26,688	5,672	13,097	2,089	1,345		1,087							49,978
Rhondda	MGM	WLS	Lab	Lab	17,183	55.3%	11,553	60.3%	1,993	17,183	3,309	358						5,630			2,599	31,072
Ribble Valley	LAN	NW	Con	Con	26,298	50.3%	14,769	67.2%	26,298	11,529	10,732	3,496									232	52,287
Richmond (Yorks)	NYK	YTH	Con	Con	33,541	62.8%	23,336	66.3%	33,541	8,150	10,205				1,516							53,412
Richmond Park	LND	LND	LD	Con	29,461	49.7%	4,091	76.2%	29,461	2,979	25,370	669			572						217	59,268
Rochdale	GTM	NW	LD	Lab	16,699	36.4%	889	58.1%	8,305	16,699	15,810	1,999									3,094	45,907
Rochester and Strood	KEN	SE		Con	23,604	49.2%	9,953	65.0%	23,604	13,651	7,800				734						2,182	47,971
Rochford and Southend East	ESS	E	Con	Con	19,509	46.9%	11,050	58.3%	19,509	8,459	8,084	2,405	1,856		707						611	41,631
Romford	LND	LND	Con	Con	26,031	56.0%	16,954	65.2%	26,031	9,077	5,572	2,050	2,438		447						866	46,481
Romsey and Southampton North	HAM	SE		Con	24,345	49.7%	4,156	71.8%	24,345	3,116	20,189	1,289										48,939
Ross, Skye and Lochaber	SCT	SCT	LD	LD	18,335	52.6%	13,070	67.2%	4,260	5,265	18,335	659		5,263	777						279	34,838
Rossendale and Darwen	LAN	NW	Lab	Con	19,691	41.8%	4,493	64.4%	19,691	15,198	8,541	1,617									2,081	47,128
Rother Valley	SYK	YTH	Lab	Lab	19,147	40.9%	5,866	64.2%	13,281	19,147	8,111	2,613	3,606									46,758
Rotherham	SYK	YTH	Lab	Lab	16,741	44.6%	10,462	59.0%	6,279	16,741	5,994	2,220	3,906								2,366	37,506
Rugby	WAR	WM		Con	20,901	44.0%	6,000	68.9%	20,901	14,901	9,434	406	1,375		451							47,468
Ruislip, Northwood and Pinner	LND	LND		Con	28,866	57.5%	19,060	70.8%	28,866	9,806	8,345	1,351			740						1,097	50,205
Runnymede and Weybridge	SRY	SE	Con	Con	26,915	55.9%	16,509	66.4%	26,915	6,446	10,406	3,146			696						541	48,150
Rushcliffe	NTT	EM	Con	Con	27,470	51.2%	15,811	73.6%	27,470	11,128	11,659	2,179			1,251							53,687
Rutherglen and Hamilton West	SCT	SCT	Lab	Lab	28,566	60.8%	21,002	61.5%	4,540	28,566	5,636	675		7,564								46,981
Rutland and Melton	LEI	EM	Con	Con	28,228	51.1%	14,000	71.5%	28,228	7,893	14,228	2,526	1,757								588	55,220
Saffron Walden	ESS	E	Con	Con	30,155	55.5%	15,242	71.5%	30,155	5,288	14,913	2,228	1,050		735							54,369
Salford and Eccles	GTM	NW		Lab	16,655	40.1%	5,725	61.5%	8,497	16,655	10,930	1,084	2,632								1,735	41,533
Salisbury	WIL	SW	Con	Con	23,859	49.2%	5,966	66.6%	23,859	3,690	17,893	1,392	765		506						376	48,481
Scarborough and Whitby	NYK	YTH	Con	Con	21,108	42.8%	8,130	70.8%	21,108	12,978	11,093	1,484	1,445		734						440	49,282
Scunthorpe	HUM	YTH	Lab	Lab	14,640	39.5%	2,549	54.7%	12,091	14,640	6,774	1,686	1,447		396							37,034
Sedgefield	DUR	NE	Lab (Note: 2007 by-election)	Lab	18,141	45.1%	8,696	59.5%	9,445	18,141	8,033	1,479	2,075								1,049	40,222
Sefton Central	MSY	NW		Lab	20,307	41.9%	3,862	70.4%	16,445	20,307	9,656	2,055										48,463
Selby and Ainsty	NYK	YTH		Con	25,562	49.4%	12,265	78.9%	25,562	13,297	9,180	1,635	1,377								677	51,728
Sevenoaks	KEN	SE	Con	Con	28,076	56.8%	17,515	73.7%	28,076	6,541	10,561	1,782	1,384								1,064	49,408
Sheffield Brightside and Hillsborough	SYK	YTH		Lab	21,400	55.0%	13,632	54.5%	4,468	21,400	7,768	1,596	3,026								656	38,914
Sheffield Central	SYK	YTH	Lab	Lab	17,138	41.3%	165	61.3%	4,206	17,138	16,973	652	903		1,556						40	41,468
Sheffield Hallam	SYK	YTH	LD	LD	27,324	53.4%	15,284	67.8%	12,040	8,228	27,324	1,195			919						1,429	51,135
Sheffield Heeley	SYK	YTH	Lab	Lab	17,409	42.6%	5,807	51.8%	7,081	17,409	11,602	1,530	2,260		989							40,871
Sheffield South East	SYK	YTH		Lab	20,169	48.7%	10,505	54.6%	7,202	20,169	9,664	1,889	2,345								139	41,408
Sherwood	NTT	EM	Lab	Con	19,211	39.2%	214	63.3%	19,211	18,997	7,283	1,490	1,754								219	48,954
Shipley	WYK	YTH	Con	Con	24,002	48.6%	9,944	58.3%	24,002	14,058	9,890				1,477							49,427
Shrewsbury and Atcham	SAL	WM	Con	Con	23,313	43.9%	7,944	68.5%	23,313	10,915	15,369	1,627	1,168		565						88	53,045
Sittingbourne and Sheppey	KEN	SE	Lab	Con	24,313	50.0%	12,383	62.8%	24,313	11,930	7,943	2,610	1,305								477	48,578
Skipton and Ripon	NYK	YTH	Con	Con	27,685	50.6%	9,950	80.6%	27,685	5,498	17,735	1,909	1,403								494	54,724
Sleaford and North Hykeham	LIN	EM	Con	Con	30,719	51.6%	19,905	73.0%	30,719	10,051	10,814	2,163	1,977								3,806	59,530
Slough	BRK	SE	Lab	Lab	21,884	45.8%	5,523	62.6%	16,361	21,884	6,943	1,517			542						495	47,742
Solihull	WMD	WM	LD	LD	23,635	42.9%	175	72.7%	23,460	4,891	23,635	1,200	1,624								319	55,129
Somerton and Frome	SOM	SW	LD	LD	28,793	47.5%	1,817	84.3%	26,976	2,675	28,793	1,932									236	60,612
South Antrim	NIR	NIR	DUP	DUP	11,536	33.9%	1,183	53.9%								4,729	11,536		2,955	10,353	4,436	34,009
South Basildon and East Thurrock	ESS	E		Con	19,624	43.9%	5,772	62.2%	19,624	13,852	5,977	2,639	2,518								125	44,735
South Cambridgeshire	CAM	E	Con	Con	27,995	47.4%	7,838	74.8%	27,995	6,024	20,157	1,873			1,039						1,968	59,056
South Derbyshire	DBY	EM	Lab	Con	22,935	45.5%	7,128	71.4%	22,935	15,807	8,012	1,206	2,193								266	50,419
South Dorset	DOR	SW	Lab	Con	22,667	45.1%	7,443	68.6%	22,667	15,224	9,557	2,034			595						233	50,310
South Down	NIR	NIR	SDLP	SDLP	20,648	48.5%	8,412	60.2%							901	12,236	3,645		20,648	3,093	2,066	42,589
South East Cambridgeshire	CAM	E	Con	Con	27,629	48.0%	5,946	69.3%	27,629	4,380	21,683	2,138			766						1,006	57,602
South East Cornwall	CUL	SW	LD	Con	22,390	45.1%	3,220	69.5%	22,390	3,507	19,170	3,083			826						641	49,617
South Holland and The Deepings	LIN	EM	Con	Con	29,639	59.1%	21,880	75.0%	29,639	7,024	7,759	3,246	1,796		724							50,188
South Leicestershire	LEI	EM		Con	27,000	49.5%	15,524	71.2%	27,000	11,392	11,476	1,988	2,721									54,577
South Norfolk	NFK	E	Con	Con	27,133	49.3%	10,940	72.2%	27,133	7,252	16,193	2,329	1,086		1,000							54,993
South Northamptonshire	NTH	EM		Con	33,081	55.2%	20,478	73.0%	33,081	10,380	12,603	2,406			685						735	59,890
South Ribble	LAN	NW	Lab	Con	23,396	45.5%	5,554	76.6%	23,396	17,842	7,271	1,895	1,054									51,458
South Shields	TWR	NE	Lab	Lab	18,995	52.0%	11,109	51.8%	7,886	18,995	5,189		2,382		762						1,304	36,518
South Staffordshire	STS	WM	Con	Con	26,834	53.2%	16,590	68.3%	26,834	10,244	8,427	2,753	1,928								254	50,440
South Suffolk	SFK	E	Con	Con	24,550	47.7%	8,689	70.9%	24,550	7,368	15,861	3,637										51,416
South Swindon	WIL	SW	Lab	Con	19,687	41.8%	3,544	64.9%	19,687	16,143	8,305	2,029			619						336	47,119
South Thanet	KEN	SE	Lab	Con	22,043	48.0%	7,617	65.6%	22,043	14,426	6,935	2,529										45,933
South West Bedfordshire	BDF	E	Con	Con	26,815	52.8%	16,649	66.3%	26,815	9,948	10,166	2,142	1,703									50,774
South West Devon	DEV	SW	Con	Con	27,908	56.0%	15,874	70.4%	27,908	6,193	12,034	3,084			641							49,860
South West Hertfordshire	HRT	E	Con	Con	30,773	54.2%	14,920	72.5%	30,773	6,526	15,853	1,450	1,302								846	56,750
South West Norfolk	NFK	E	Con	Con	23,753	48.3%	13,140	66.6%	23,753	9,119	10,613	3,061	1,774		830							49,150
South West Surrey	SRY	SE	Con	Con	33,605	58.7%	16,318	74.8%	33,605	3,419	17,287	1,486	644		690						128	57,259
South West Wiltshire	WIL	SW		Con	25,321	51.7%	10,367	68.4%	25,321	5,613	14,954	2,684									446	49,018
Southampton Itchen	HAM	SE	Lab	Lab	16,326	36.8%	192	63.4%	16,134	16,326	9,256	1,928			600						168	44,412
Southampton Test	HAM	SE	Lab	Lab	17,001	38.5%	2,413	58.7%	14,588	17,001	9,865	1,726			881						126	44,187
Southend West	ESS	E	Con	Con	20,086	46.1%	7,270	58.2%	20,086	5,850	12,816	1,714	1,333		644						1,163	43,606
Southport	MSY	NW	LD	LD	21,707	49.6%	6,024	56.1%	15,683	4,116	21,707	2,251										43,757
Spelthorne	SRY	SE	Con	Con	22,261	47.1%	10,019	70.7%	22,261	7,789	12,242	4,009									1,003	47,304
St Albans	HRT	E	Con	Con	21,533	40.8%	2,305	70.0%	21,533	9,288	19,228	2,028			758							52,835
St Austell and Newquay	CUL	SW		LD	20,189	42.7%	1,312	70.1%	18,877	3,386	20,189	1,757	1,022								2,007	47,238
St Helens North	MSY	NW	Lab	Lab	23,041	51.7%	13,101	59.0%	9,940	23,041	8,992	2,100									483	44,556
St Helens South and Whiston	MSY	NW		Lab	24,364	52.9%	14,122	73.0%	8,209	24,364	10,242	1,226	2,040									46,081
St Ives	CUL	SW	LD	LD	19,619	42.7%	1,719	70.9%	17,900	3,751	19,619	2,560			1,308						783	45,921
Stafford	STS	WM	Lab	Con	22,047	43.9%	5,460	71.1%	22,047	16,587	8,211	1,727	1,103		564							50,239
Staffordshire Moorlands	STS	WM	Lab	Con	19,793	45.2%	6,689	70.5%	19,793	13,104	7,338	3,580										43,815
Stalybridge and Hyde	GTM	NW	Lab	Lab	16,189	39.6%	2,744	59.2%	13,445	16,189	6,965	1,342	2,259		679							40,879
Stevenage	HRT	E	Lab	Con	18,491	41.4%	3,578	64.8%	18,491	14,913	7,432	2,004	1,007								804	44,651
Stirling	SCT	SCT	Lab	Lab	19,558	41.8%	8,304	70.9%	11,254	19,558	6,797	395		8,091	746							46,841
Stockport	GTM	NW	Lab	Lab	16,697	42.7%	6,919	62.2%	9,913	16,697	9,778	862	1,201		677							39,128
Stockton North	NYK	NE	Lab	Lab	16,923	42.8%	6,676	59.2%	10,247	16,923	6,342	1,556	1,724								2,706	39,498
Stockton South	NYK	NE	Lab	Con	19,577	38.9%	332	68.1%	19,577	19,245	7,600	1,471	1,553								838	50,284
Stoke-on-Trent Central	STS	WM	Lab	Lab	12,605	38.8%	5,566	53.2%	6,833	12,605	7,039	1,402	2,502								2,089	32,470
Stoke-on-Trent North	STS	WM	Lab	Lab	17,815	44.3%	8,235	55.8%	9,580	17,815	7,120	2,485	3,196									40,196
Stoke-on-Trent South	STS	WM	Lab	Lab	15,446	38.8%	4,130	58.6%	11,316	15,446	6,323	1,363	3,762								1,642	39,852
Stone	STS	WM	Con	Con	23,890	50.6%	13,292	70.4%	23,890	9,770	10,598	2,481			490							47,229
Stourbridge	WMD	WM	Lab	Con	20,153	42.7%	5,164	67.8%	20,153	14,989	7,733	2,103	1,696		394						166	47,234
Strangford	NIR	NIR	DUP	DUP	14,926	45.9%	5,876	53.7%							562	1,161	14,926		2,164	9,050	4,642	32,505
Stratford-on-Avon	WAR	WM	Con	Con	26,052	51.5%	11,976	72.7%	26,052	4,809	14,706	1,846	1,097		527						1,505	50,542
Streatham	LND	LND	Lab	Lab	20,037	42.8%	3,259	62.8%	8,578	20,037	16,778				861						583	46,837
Stretford and Urmston	GTM	NW	Lab	Lab	21,821	48.6%	8,935	63.3%	12,886	21,821	7,601	1,508			916						178	44,910
Stroud	GLS	SW	Lab	Con	23,679	40.8%	1,299	74.1%	23,679	22,380	8,955	1,301			1,542						116	57,973
Suffolk Coastal	SFK	E	Con	Con	25,475	46.4%	9,128	71.7%	25,475	8,812	16,347	3,156			1,103							54,893
Sunderland Central	TWR	NE		Lab	19,495	45.9%	6,725	57.0%	12,770	19,495	7,191	1,094	1,913									42,463
Surrey Heath	SRY	SE	Con	Con	31,326	57.6%	17,289	69.6%	31,326	5,552	14,037	3,432										54,347
Sutton and Cheam	LND	LND	LD	LD	22,156	45.7%	1,608	72.8%	20,548	3,376	22,156	950	1,014		246						218	48,508
Sutton Coldfield	WMD	WM	Con	Con	27,303	54.0%	17,005	67.9%	27,303	10,298	9,117	1,587	1,749		535							50,589
Swansea East	WGM	WLS	Lab	Lab	16,819	51.5%	10,838	54.6%	4,823	16,819	5,981	839	1,715		318			2,181				32,676
Swansea West	WGM	WLS	Lab	Lab	12,335	34.7%	504	58.0%	7,407	12,335	11,831	716	910		404			1,437			553	35,593
Tamworth	STS	WM	Lab	Con	21,238	45.8%	6,090	64.5%	21,238	15,148	7,516	2,253									235	46,390
Tatton	CHS	NW	Con	Con	24,687	54.6%	14,487	67.8%	24,687	7,803	10,200										2,541	45,231
Taunton Deane	SOM	SW		LD	28,531	49.1%	3,993	70.5%	24,538	2,967	28,531	2,114										58,150
Telford	SAL	WM	Lab	Lab	15,974	38.7%	978	63.5%	14,996	15,974	6,399	2,428	1,513									41,310
Tewkesbury	GLS	SW	Con	Con	25,472	47.2%	6,310	70.4%	25,472	6,253	19,162	2,230			525						319	53,961
The Cotswolds	GLS	SW	Con	Con	29,075	53.0%	12,864	71.5%	29,075	5,886	16,211	2,292			940						428	54,832
The Wrekin	SAL	WM	Con	Con	21,922	47.7%	9,450	70.1%	21,922	12,472	8,019	2,050	1,505									45,968
Thirsk and Malton	NYK	YTH		Con	20,167	52.9%	11,281	49.9%	20,167	5,169	8,886	2,502									1,418	38,142
Thornbury and Yate	AVN	SW		LD	25,032	51.9%	7,116	75.2%	17,916	3,385	25,032	1,709									184	48,226
Thurrock	ESS	E	Lab	Con	16,869	36.8%	92	58.9%	16,869	16,777	4,901	3,390	3,618								266	45,821
Tiverton and Honiton	DEV	SW	Con	Con	27,614	50.3%	9,320	71.5%	27,614	4,907	18,294	3,277			802							54,894
Tonbridge and Malling	KEN	SE	Con	Con	29,723	57.9%	18,178	71.5%	29,723	6,476	11,545	1,911			764						895	51,314
Tooting	LND	LND	Lab	Lab	22,038	43.5%	2,524	68.6%	19,514	22,038	7,509	624			609						361	50,655
Torbay	DEV	SW	LD	LD	23,126	47.0%	4,078	64.5%	19,048	3,231	23,126	2,628	709		468							49,210
Torfaen	GNT	WLS	Lab	Lab	16,847	44.8%	9,306	61.5%	7,541	16,847	6,264	862	1,657		438			2,005			2,026	37,640
Torridge and West Devon	DEV	SW	Con	Con	25,230	45.7%	2,957	71.4%	25,230	2,917	22,273	3,021	766		1,050							55,257
Totnes	DEV	SW	Con	Con	21,940	45.9%	4,927	70.4%	21,940	3,538	17,013	2,890	624		1,181						657	47,843
Tottenham	LND	LND	Lab	Lab	24,128	59.3%	16,931	59.1%	6,064	24,128	7,197	466			980						1,852	40,687
Truro and Falmouth	CUL	SW		Con	20,349	41.7%	435	69.1%	20,349	4,697	19,914	1,911			858						1,039	48,768
Tunbridge Wells	KEN	SE	Con	Con	28,302	56.2%	15,576	68.1%	28,302	5,448	12,726	2,054	704		914						172	50,320
Twickenham	LND	LND	LD	LD	32,483	54.4%	12,140	74.1%	20,343	4,583	32,483	868	654		674						116	59,721
Tynemouth	TWR	NE	Lab	Lab	23,860	45.3%	5,739	69.6%	18,121	23,860	7,845	900	1,404		538							52,668
Upper Bann	NIR	NIR	DUP	DUP	14,000	33.8%	3,361	55.4%								10,237	14,000		5,276	10,639	1,231	41,383
Uxbridge and South Ruislip	LND	LND		Con	21,758	48.3%	11,216	63.3%	21,758	10,542	8,995	1,234	1,396		477						674	45,076
Vale of Clwyd	CON	WLS	Lab	Lab	15,017	42.3%	2,509	63.7%	12,508	15,017	4,472	515	827					2,068			127	35,534
Vale of Glamorgan	SGM	WLS	Lab	Con	20,341	41.8%	4,307	69.3%	20,341	16,034	7,403	1,529			457			2,667			236	48,667
Vauxhall	LND	LND	Lab	Lab	21,498	49.8%	10,651	57.7%	9,301	21,498	10,847				708						837	43,191
Wakefield	WYK	YTH	Lab	Lab	17,454	39.3%	1,613	62.8%	15,841	17,454	7,256		2,581		873						439	44,444
Wallasey	MSY	NW	Lab	Lab	21,578	51.8%	8,507	63.2%	13,071	21,578	5,693	1,205									107	41,654
Walsall North	WMD	WM	Lab	Lab	13,385	37.0%	990	56.5%	12,395	13,385	4,754	1,737	2,930								986	36,187
Walsall South	WMD	WM	Lab	Lab	16,211	39.7%	1,755	63.5%	14,456	16,211	5,880	3,449									886	40,882
Walthamstow	LND	LND	Lab	Lab	21,252	51.8%	9,478	63.4%	5,734	21,252	11,774	823			767						644	40,994
Wansbeck	NBL	NE	Lab	Lab	17,548	45.8%	7,031	61.9%	6,714	17,548	10,517	974	1,418		601						501	38,273
Wantage	OXF	SE	Con	Con	29,284	52.0%	13,547	70.0%	29,284	7,855	15,737	2,421			1,044							56,341
Warley	WMD	WM	Lab	Lab	20,240	52.9%	10,756	61.0%	9,484	20,240	5,929	2,617										38,270
Warrington North	CHS	NW	Lab	Lab	20,135	45.5%	6,771	62.7%	13,364	20,135	9,196										1,516	44,211
Warrington South	CHS	NW	Lab	Con	19,641	35.8%	1,553	69.3%	19,641	18,088	15,094	1,624			427							54,874
Warwick and Leamington	WAR	WM	Lab	Con	20,876	42.6%	3,483	72.3%	20,876	17,363	8,977	926			693						197	49,032
Washington and Sunderland West	TWR	NE		Lab	19,615	52.5%	11,458	54.2%	8,157	19,615	6,382	1,267	1,913									37,334
Watford	HRT	E	Lab	Con	19,291	34.9%	1,425	68.3%	19,291	14,750	17,866	1,199	1,217		885							55,208
Waveney	SFK	E	Lab	Con	20,571	40.2%	769	65.1%	20,571	19,802	6,811	2,684			1,167						106	51,141
Wealden	SXE	SE	Con	Con	31,090	56.6%	17,179	71.8%	31,090	5,266	13,911	3,319			1,383							54,969
Weaver Vale	CHS	NW	Lab	Con	16,953	38.5%	991	65.4%	16,953	15,962	8,196	1,018	1,063		338						460	43,990
Wellingborough	NTH	EM	Con	Con	24,918	48.2%	11,787	67.2%	24,918	13,131	8,848	1,636	1,596		480						1,052	51,661
Wells	SOM	SW	Con	LD	24,560	44.0%	800	70.3%	23,760	4,198	24,560	1,711	1,004		631							55,864
Welwyn Hatfield	HRT	E	Con	Con	27,894	57.0%	17,423	68.0%	27,894	10,471	8,010	1,643			796						158	48,972
Wentworth and Dearne	SYK	YTH		Lab	21,316	50.6%	13,920	58.0%	7,396	21,316	6,787	3,418	3,189									42,106
West Aberdeenshire and Kincardine	SCT	SCT	LD	LD	17,362	38.4%	3,684	68.4%	13,678	6,159	17,362	397	513	7,086								45,195
West Bromwich East	WMD	WM	Lab	Lab	17,657	46.5%	6,696	60.6%	10,961	17,657	4,993	984	2,205								1,150	37,950
West Bromwich West	WMD	WM	Lab	Lab	16,263	45.0%	5,651	55.8%	10,612	16,263	4,336	1,566	3,394									36,171
West Dorset	DOR	SW	Con	Con	27,287	47.6%	3,923	74.6%	27,287	3,815	23,364	2,196			675							57,337
West Dunbartonshire	SCT	SCT	Lab	Lab	25,905	61.3%	17,408	64.0%	3,242	25,905	3,434	683		8,497							505	42,266
West Ham	LND	LND	Lab	Lab	29,422	62.7%	22,534	55.0%	6,888	29,422	5,392	766			645						3,838	46,951
West Lancashire	LAN	NW	Lab	Lab	21,883	45.1%	4,343	65.7%	17,540	21,883	6,573	1,775			485						217	48,473
West Suffolk	SFK	E	Con	Con	24,312	50.6%	13,050	64.7%	24,312	7,089	11,262	3,085	1,428								913	48,089
West Tyrone	NIR	NIR	SF	SF	18,050	48.4%	10,685	61.0%								18,050	7,365		5,212	5,281	1,367	37,275
West Worcestershire	HWR	WM	Con	Con	27,213	50.3%	6,754	74.3%	27,213	3,661	20,459	2,119			641							54,093
Westminster North	LND	LND		Lab	17,377	43.9%	2,126	59.3%	15,251	17,377	5,513	315	334		478						330	39,598
Westmorland and Lonsdale	CMA	NW	LD	LD	30,896	60.0%	12,264	76.9%	18,632	1,158	30,896	801										51,487
Weston-Super-Mare	AVN	SW	Con	Con	23,356	44.3%	2,691	67.2%	23,356	5,772	20,665	1,406	1,098								419	52,716
Wigan	GTM	NW	Lab	Lab	21,404	48.5%	10,487	58.5%	10,917	21,404	6,797	2,516	2,506									44,140
Wimbledon	LND	LND	Con	Con	23,257	49.1%	11,408	72.1%	23,257	10,550	11,849	914			590						235	47,395
Winchester	HAM	SE	LD	Con	27,155	48.5%	3,048	75.8%	27,155	3,051	24,107	1,139									503	55,955
Windsor	BRK	SE	Con	Con	30,172	60.8%	19,054	71.3%	30,172	4,910	11,118	1,612	950		628						198	49,588
Wirral South	MSY	NW	Lab	Lab	16,276	40.8%	531	71.1%	15,745	16,276	6,611	1,274										39,906
Wirral West	MSY	NW	Lab	Con	16,726	42.5%	2,436	71.5%	16,726	14,290	6,630	899									827	39,372
Witham	ESS	E		Con	24,448	52.2%	15,196	69.9%	24,448	8,656	9,252	3,060			1,419							46,835
Witney	OXF	SE	Con	Con	33,973	58.8%	22,740	73.3%	33,973	7,511	11,233	2,001			2,385						666	57,769
Woking	SRY	SE	Con	Con	26,551	50.3%	6,807	71.5%	26,551	4,246	19,744	1,997									248	52,786
Wokingham	BRK	SE	Con	Con	28,754	52.7%	13,492	71.4%	28,754	5,516	15,262	1,664			567						2,765	54,528
Wolverhampton North East	WMD	WM	Lab	Lab	14,448	41.4%	2,484	59.2%	11,964	14,448	4,711	1,138	2,296								337	34,894
Wolverhampton South East	WMD	WM	Lab	Lab	16,505	47.6%	6,593	58.0%	9,912	16,505	5,277	2,675									338	34,707
Wolverhampton South West	WMD	WM	Lab	Con	16,344	40.7%	691	68.2%	16,344	15,653	6,430	1,487									246	40,160
Worcester	HWR	WM	Lab	Con	19,358	39.5%	2,982	67.2%	19,358	16,376	9,525	1,360	1,219		735						401	48,974
Workington	CMA	NW	Lab	Lab	17,865	45.5%	4,575	65.9%	13,290	17,865	5,318	876	1,496								414	39,259
Worsley and Eccles South	GTM	NW		Lab	17,892	42.9%	4,337	57.5%	13,555	17,892	6,883	2,037									1,334	41,701
Worthing West	WSX	SE	Con	Con	25,416	51.7%	11,729	64.7%	25,416	5,800	13,687	2,924			996						300	49,123
Wrexham	CON	WLS	Lab	Lab	12,161	36.9%	3,658	64.8%	8,375	12,161	8,503	774	1,134					2,029				32,976
Wycombe	BKM	SE	Con	Con	23,423	48.6%	9,560	64.9%	23,423	8,326	13,863	2,123									416	48,151
Wyre and Preston North	LAN	NW		Con	26,877	52.4%	15,844	73.1%	26,877	10,932	11,033	2,466										51,308
Wyre Forest	HWR	WM	ICHC	Con	18,793	36.9%	2,643	66.3%	18,793	7,298	6,040	1,498	1,120								16,150	50,899
Wythenshawe and Sale East	GTM	NW	Lab	Lab	17,987	44.1%	7,575	51.0%	10,412	17,987	9,107	1,405	1,572								268	40,751
Yeovil	SOM	SW	LD	LD	31,843	55.7%	13,036	69.4%	18,807	2,991	31,843	2,357	1,162									57,160
Ynys Mon	GWN	WLS	Lab	Lab	11,490	33.4%	2,461	68.8%	7,744	11,490	2,592	1,201						9,029			2,388	34,444
York Central	NYK	YTH		Lab	18,573	40.0%	6,451	60.8%	12,122	18,573	11,694	1,100	1,171		1,669						154	46,483
York Outer	NYK	YTH		Con	22,912	43.0%	3,688	70.2%	22,912	9,108	19,224	1,100	956									53,300
Total for all constituencies								65.1%	10,703,654	8,606,517	6,836,248	919,471	564,321	491,386	285,612	171,942	168,216	165,394	110,970	102,361	561,512	29,687,604
Total for all constituencies								65.1%	36.1%	29.0%	23.0%	3.1%	1.9%	1.7%	1.0%	0.6%	0.6%	0.6%	0.4%	0.3%	1.9%	100.0%
Total for all constituencies								65.1%	Seats													
Total for all constituencies								65.1%	306	258	57	0	0	6	1	5	8	3	3	0	2	650
Total for all constituencies								65.1%	47.1%	39.7%	8.8%	0.0%	0.0%	0.9%	0.2%	0.8%	1.2%	0.5%	0.5%	0.0%	0.5%	100.0%

== See also ==
- Results of the 2017 United Kingdom general election
- Results of the 2015 United Kingdom general election
- List of political parties in the United Kingdom
- List of United Kingdom by-elections (1979–2010)
