= Alister Jack =

Scottish politician (born 1963)

The Right Honourable The Lord Jack of Courance KBE PC DL
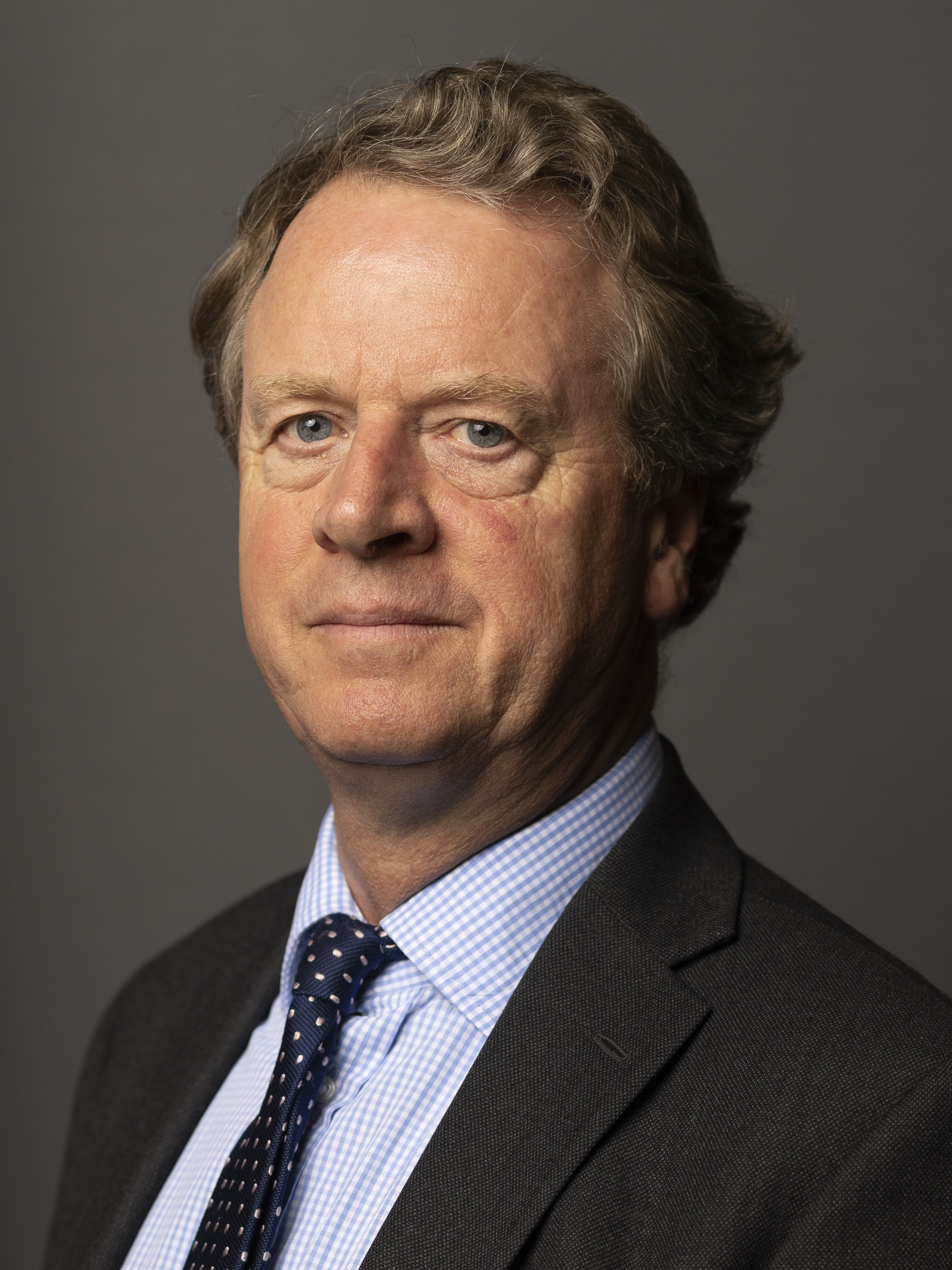
- Official portrait, 2022

Secretary of State for Scotland
- In office 24 July 2019 – 5 July 2024
- Prime Minister: Boris Johnson; Liz Truss; Rishi Sunak
- Preceded by: David Mundell
- Succeeded by: Ian Murray

Lord Commissioner of the Treasury
- In office 23 April 2019 – 24 July 2019
- Prime Minister: Theresa May
- Preceded by: Craig Whittaker
- Succeeded by: Colin Clark

Member of the House of Lords
- Lord Temporal
- Life peerage 9 May 2025

Member of Parliament for Dumfries and Galloway
- In office 8 June 2017 – 30 May 2024
- Preceded by: Richard Arkless
- Succeeded by: John Cooper

Personal details
- Born: Alister William Jack; 7 July 1963 (age 63) Dumfries, Scotland
- Party: Conservative Party
- Spouse: Ann Hodgson (m. 1987)
- Children: 3
- Education: Heriot-Watt University

Alister William Jack, Baron Jack of Courance (born 7 July 1963) is a Scottish businessman and politician who served as Secretary of State for Scotland from 2019 to 2024. A member of the Conservative Party, he served as the Member of Parliament (MP) for Dumfries and Galloway from 2017 to 2024, before being made a life peer in 2025.

== Early life and career ==
Alister Jack was born on 7 July 1963 in Dumfries, Scotland. to David and Jean Jack CVO. His mother Jean was Lord Lieutenant of Dumfries from 2006 to 2016. He was raised in Dalbeattie and Kippford, and was educated at Dalbeattie Primary School, at Crawfordton House – a private prep school near Moniaive, Dumfriesshire – and then at Glenalmond College, an all-boys private boarding school. He then attended Heriot-Watt University.

Jack is a businessman, having founded tent-hire and self-storage companies, the latter building his fortune of £20 million. He currently owns a farm of 1,200 acres (500 hectares) in Courance, near Lockerbie. He formerly chaired the River Annan Fishery Board and Trust, Fisheries Management Scotland and Galloway Woodlands.

== Parliamentary career ==
At the 1997 general election, Jack stood in Tweeddale, Ettrick and Lauderdale, coming third with 22.1% of the vote behind the Liberal Democrat candidate Michael Moore and the Labour candidate.

Jack was elected to Parliament at the snap 2017 general election as MP for Dumfries and Galloway with 43.3% of the vote and a majority of 5,643.

Once in Parliament, Jack was a member of the Treasury Select Committee from 2017-2019.

On 16 February 2018, he signed a letter to Theresa May, making suggestions about the way the United Kingdom should leave the European Union.

Jack was appointed parliamentary private secretary (PPS) to the Leader of the House of Lords on 31 August 2018, a position he held until he was appointed an Assistant Government Whip on 20 February 2019.

On 23 April 2019 he was appointed Lord Commissioner of the Treasury, a role in the Government Whips Office.

=== Secretary of State for Scotland ===
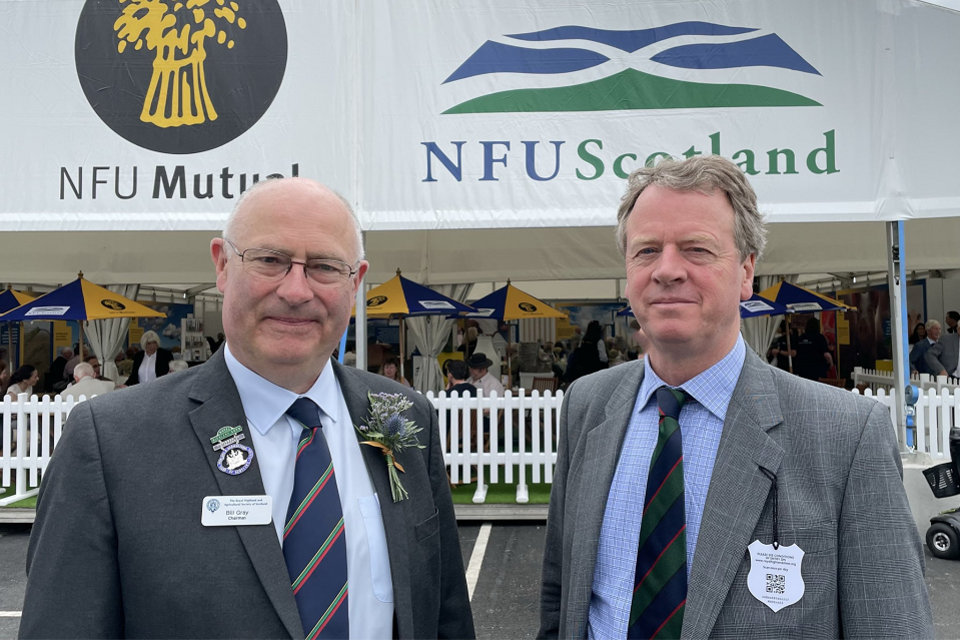
Jack (right) at Royal Highland Show bicentenary celebrations with Bill Gray of the Royal Highland and Agricultural Society of Scotland (left)

Jack was appointed as Secretary of State for Scotland by Boris Johnson on 24 July 2019. Jack was the first MP of the 2017 intake to join the Cabinet.

At the 2019 general election, Jack was re-elected as MP for Dumfries and Galloway with an increased vote share of 44.1% and a decreased majority of 1,805.

He was reappointed to the Truss ministry in September 2022.

On 10 September 2022, Jack attended the Accession Council and Principal Proclamation for His Majesty King Charles III at St James's Palace, London. Jack signed the Official Proclamation and witnessed His Majesty's Oath relating to the security of the Church of Scotland.

On 15 September 2022, as a member of the Royal Company of Archers, Jack and fellow Cabinet Minister Ben Wallace stood vigil at Queen Elizabeth II's coffin.

On 17 January 2023, Jack exercised the Section 35 power granted to him as Secretary of State for Scotland in the 1998 Scotland Act and stopped the Scottish Government's Gender Recognition Reform Bill from proceeding to Royal Assent.

On 17 May 2023, he announced he would stand down at the 2024 general election.

Appearing at the COVID-19 Inquiry in Edinburgh on 1 February 2024, Jack was asked about Nicola Sturgeon's testimony, where she became emotional, that she was able to put aside her views on Scottish independence when making decisions during the pandemic. He dismissed this and responded that he did not believe her. Jack went on to remark that Nicola Sturgeon "could cry from one eye if she wanted to".

=== House of Lords ===
In April 2025, Jack was nominated for a life peerage as part of the 2024 Prime Minister's Resignation Honours. He was created as Baron Jack of Courance, of Courance in the County of Dumfriesshire on 9 May 2025 and took his seat in the House of Lords three days later.

On 27 January 2026, Jack was appointed to the UK Parliament’s Joint Committee on the National Security Strategy.

== Personal life ==
Jack married Ann Hodgson in 1987. They have a son and two daughters.

== Honours ==
Jack was sworn as a member of the Privy Council on 25 July 2019, on his appointment as Secretary of State for Scotland. He is a former deputy lieutenant for the lieutenancy area of Dumfries. On 4 July 2024, Jack was appointed Knight Commander of the Order of the British Empire (KBE) in the 2024 Dissolution Honours for political and public service.

Parliament of the United Kingdom
Preceded by Richard Arkless	Member of Parliament for Dumfries and Galloway; 2017–2024	Succeeded by John Cooper
Political offices
Preceded by David Mundell	Secretary of State for Scotland; 2019–2024	Succeeded by Ian Murray
