= Russell Brown (British politician) =

British politician (born 1951)

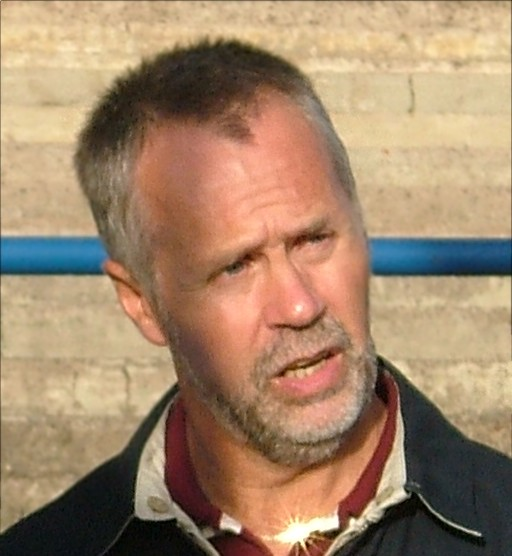
- Brown in 2005

Shadow Minister for Scotland
- In office 7 October 2013 – 8 May 2015
- Leader: Ed Miliband
- Preceded by: Willie Bain
- Succeeded by: Wayne David

Shadow Minister for International Security Strategy
- In office 8 October 2010 – 7 October 2013
- Leader: Ed Miliband
- Preceded by: Position established
- Succeeded by: Yvonne Fovargue

Member of Parliament for Dumfries and Galloway Dumfries (1997–2005)
- In office 1 May 1997 – 30 March 2015
- Preceded by: Hector Monro
- Succeeded by: Richard Arkless

Personal details
- Born: 17 September 1951 (age 74) Annan, Dumfriesshire, Scotland
- Party: Labour
- Spouse: Christine Margaret Calvert

Russell Leslie Brown (born 17 September 1951) is a Scottish Labour Party politician. He is a former Member of Parliament (MP) for Dumfriesshire (1997–2005) and Dumfries and Galloway (2005–2015). He lost his seat at the 2015 general election to Richard Arkless of the Scottish National Party.

== Early years ==
Russell Brown was born in Annan, Scotland, and attended the local Annan Academy. In 1974 he began work as a plant operative at ICI and remained with the company until his election to Westminster.

== Political history ==
He was elected as a branch chairman within the Transport and General Workers Union 1979–1985. In 1986, Brown was elected as a councillor to the Dumfries and Galloway Regional Council, and was the Labour Group Leader 1995–97. Between 1988 and 1996 he also served as a councillor on the Annandale and Eskdale District Council.

He was selected to contest the seemingly safe Conservative and Unionist seat of Dumfries at the 1997 UK General Election. The MP of 33 years, Hector Monro retired and the Conservative and Unionist candidate was Struan Stevenson. The Conservative Party were completely wiped out in Scotland in 1997, and he was elected as the Labour MP for Dumfries with a majority of 9,643 votes. He made his maiden speech in the House of Commons on Monday 7 July 1997.

Russell Brown became a Member of the Scottish Affairs Select committee in 1999, and left the committee after the 2001 general election. He was made a Parliamentary Private Secretary to the Leader of the House of Lords, Gareth Wyn Williams of Mostyn in 2002. When Williams died in 2003, he continued in the same position with his successor Valerie Amos. Brown resigned from the government in 2003 in protest at the proposed military intervention in Iraq, stepping down from his position as parliamentary aide to Lord Williams of Mostyn, leader of the House of Lords. Brown subsequently "voted against saying that the case for war against Iraq has not yet been established" and was absent for the vote to declare war.

In the major redistribution of Scottish seats, his constituency of Dumfries was abolished and the new seat of Dumfries and Galloway was created. At the 2005 general election he faced the sitting Conservative MP for Galloway and Upper Nithsdale Peter Duncan. Brown defeated Duncan, and was elected with a majority of 2,922 votes. Following the general election, he became the PPS to the Secretary of State for Scotland Alistair Darling and his successor Jim Murphy.

At the 2010 general election Russell Brown was again challenged by Peter Duncan, the Conservative MP he defeated five years previously; who is now a councillor on Dumfries and Galloway Council. Despite Labour losing the election nationally, Russell Brown's popularity locally meant he almost tripled his majority to 7,449 votes. In October 2010, Russell Brown was appointed to Labour's front bench as a Shadow Defence Minister. His brief was Shadow Minister for International Security Strategy. He was also a member of the Public Bill Committee for the Defence Reform Act.

Brown lost his seat at the 2015 general election, finishing in third place with 13,982 votes behind the Scottish Conservatives' Finlay Carson with 16,926 votes and the winner: SNP's Richard Arkless with 23,440 votes.

== Personal life ==
He married Christine Margaret Calvert in 1973 and they have two daughters together. He speaks French and German. Brown is a supporter of Queen of the South. He has appeared on television speaking about the club, and tabled an early day motion in the House of Commons congratulating them on their reaching the semi-final of the 2008 Scottish Cup. As of 2023, Brown was the vice-chairman of his hometown football club Annan Athletic.

Parliament of the United Kingdom
Preceded by Hector Monro	Member of Parliament for Dumfries; 1997–2005	Constituency abolished
New constituency	Member of Parliament for Dumfries and Galloway; 2005–2015	Succeeded by Richard Arkless
