= List of Scottish National Party MPs (2010–2015) =

This is a list of Scottish National Party (SNP) members of Parliament (MPs) elected to the House of Commons for the Fifty-Fifth Parliament of the United Kingdom (2010 to 2015).

It includes both MPs elected at the 2010 general election, held on 6 May 2010, and those subsequently elected in by-elections.

== MPs ==
MP	Surname, Firstname	Constituency	First elected	Notes
Stewart Hosie	Hosie, Stewart	Dundee East	2005	
Angus MacNeil	MacNeil, Angus	Na h-Eileanan an Iar (Western Isles)	2005	
Angus Robertson	Robertson, Angus	Moray	2001	
Eilidh Whiteford	Whiteford, Eilidh	Banff and Buchan	2010	
Michael Weir	Weir, Michael	Angus	2001	
Peter Wishart	Wishart, Peter	Perth and North Perthshire	2001	

== See also ==
- Scottish National Party
- Results of the 2010 United Kingdom general election
- List of MPs for Scotland
