= Richard Arkless =

Scottish politician

Member of Parliament for Dumfries and Galloway
- In office 7 May 2015 – 3 May 2017
- Preceded by: Russell Brown
- Succeeded by: Alister Jack

Personal details
- Born: 7 July 1975 (age 51) Stranraer, Scotland, UK
- Party: Scottish National Party
- Relatives: Nick Arkless (brother)
- Education: Glasgow Caledonian University; University of Strathclyde

Richard Lambert Thomas Arkless (born 7 July 1975) is a Scottish National Party politician, who was elected as MP for Dumfries and Galloway at the 2015 UK general election. He lost his seat at the following election in 2017.

== Background and education ==
Arkless was born in Stranraer in 1975. He spent an early part of his childhood living in London. He returned to Stranraer when he was eight years old.

He received a BA in Financial Services from Glasgow Caledonian University and has an LLB from the University of Strathclyde.

== Political career ==
Arkless began to advocate Scottish independence after the 2007 Scottish Parliament election in which the SNP were elected as a minority government for the first time. After a year, he said the SNP were "doing a pretty good job". When the SNP won a majority in the 2011 Scottish Parliament election, he said in a May 2015 interview with The National, "I began to really research the figures – the GDP and tax-take – and I was completely and utterly astonished. I couldn't believe that Scotland had a higher per capita GDP, and much higher per capita tax-take over each of the last thirty-five years. I was flabbergasted and asked myself why I had believed completely the opposite all my life without every trying to make it evidence based."

Standing for the SNP at the 2015 United Kingdom general election, Arkless received 23,440 votes, 41.4% of those cast, winning with a majority of 6,514 votes. He defeated Labour's Russell Brown, who had held the Dumfries and Galloway seat since its creation ten years prior in 2005. His wife Anne worked as his personal assistant. Arkless lost his seat in the UK 2017 general election to Conservative MP Alister Jack. He received 16,701 votes, 32.4% of those cast.

At the 2019 election, Arkless contested the Dumfries and Galloway seat again as the SNP candidate. He received 20,873 of the votes, 40.6% of those cast. He lost out to the Scottish Secretary, Alister Jack for a second time.

== Business career ==
Arkless left his job as a solicitor to run an online business. He returned to his career as a solicitor in 2020 following his departure from politics.

Parliament of the United Kingdom
Preceded by Russell Brown	Member of Parliament for Dumfries and Galloway; 2015–2017	Succeeded by Alister Jack
