= List of Scottish National Party MPs (2005–2010) =

This is a list of Scottish National Party (SNP) members of Parliament (MPs) elected to the House of Commons for the Fifty-Fourth Parliament of the United Kingdom (2005 to 2010).

It includes both MPs elected at the 2005 general election, held on 5 May 2005, and those subsequently elected in by-elections.

The list is sorted by the name of the MP.

== MPs ==
Name	Constituency	First elected	Notes
Stewart Hosie	Dundee East	2005	
Angus MacNeil	Na h-Eileanan an Iar (Western Isles)	2005	
John Mason	Glasgow East	2008	
Angus Robertson	Moray	2001	
Alex Salmond	Banff and Buchan	1987	Party leader
Mike Weir	Angus	2001	
Pete Wishart	Perth and North Perthshire	2001	

== See also ==
- Scottish National Party
- Results of the 2005 United Kingdom general election
- List of MPs for Scotland
- List of MPs for Scottish constituencies 2005–2010
