= Dumfries and Galloway (UK Parliament constituency) =

UK Parliament constituency (since 2005)

Coordinates: 55.069°N 3.608°W

- County constituency for the House of Commons
- Interactive map of boundaries from 2024
- Location within Scotland
- Subdivision: Dumfries and Galloway
- Electorate: 76,863 (March 2020)
- Major settlements: Dumfries, Stranraer

Current constituency
- Created: 2005
- Member of Parliament: John Cooper (Conservative)
- Created from: Galloway and Upper Nithsdale and Dumfries

Dumfries and Galloway is a constituency in Scotland represented in the House of Commons of the UK Parliament by John Cooper of the Scottish Conservatives since the 2024 general election. It was first contested in the 2005 general election, replacing Galloway and Upper Nithsdale and part of Dumfries. Like all British constituencies, it elects one Member of Parliament (MP) by the first-past-the-post system of election. Despite its name, it does not cover the whole of the Dumfries and Galloway council area.

== Boundaries ==
The Dumfries and Galloway constituency was created by the Fifth Review of the Boundary Commission for Scotland, and covers part of the Dumfries and Galloway council area. The rest of the council area is covered by the Dumfriesshire, Clydesdale and Tweeddale constituency, which also covers part of the Scottish Borders council area and part of the South Lanarkshire council area.

2005–2024: Under the Fifth Review, the boundaries were defined in accordance with the ward structure in place on 30 November 2004. Further to reviews of local government ward boundaries which came into effect in 2007 and 2017, but did not affect the parliamentary boundaries, the constituency comprised the following wards or part wards of the Dumfries and Galloway Council: Stranraer and the Rhins, Abbey, Castle Douglas and Crocketford, Dee and Glenkens, Lochar (most), Mid Galloway and Wigtown West, Mid and Upper Nithsdale (small part), Nith (most), and North West Dumfries.

2024–present: Further to the 2023 review of Westminster constituencies which came into effect for the 2024 general election, the constituency was subject to minor boundary changes, with the whole of the Nith ward now included, offset by the loss of a further part of the Lochar ward.

== Constituency profile ==
Located in the southwest of Scotland, this is a large and rural seat with significant farming and forestry sectors, including the Galloway Forest Park. Dumfries is an economic hub for south Scotland and is also Dumfries and Galloway's largest town. The seat also contains many other small towns and villages such as Castle Douglas, Dalbeattie, Auchincairn, Kirkcudbright, Gatehouse of Fleet, Creetown, Glenluce, and Stranraer. Stranraer, which is the area's second-largest town, was formerly a port town where ferries to Northern Ireland departed from, but they have since moved to Cairnryan, six miles north of Stranraer.

== Political history ==
The seat has had a mixed electoral history. In 2005, the Labour Party won the seat and held it again in 2010, but lost the seat to the Scottish National Party (SNP) in 2015. The SNP held the seat from 2015 until 2017 before losing the seat to the Conservative Party in the 2017 general election, who held it in 2019 and 2024.

Dumfries and Galloway's predecessor seats, Galloway and Upper Nithsdale (1983–2005) and Galloway (1918–83), had been represented by Conservative MPs in all but two parliaments since 1931. Galloway and Upper Nithsdale was won by the Scottish National Party in 1997 but became the only Scottish seat to return a Conservative MP at the 2001 general election.

Boundary changes for the 2005 election saw the new seat have a very slim Labour majority over the Conservatives, and the SNP were in close third place. Russell Brown was the Labour candidate, who had been the MP for the neighbouring seat of Dumfriesshire since 1997, and Peter Duncan, the sitting MP for Galloway and Upper Nithsdale, stood as the Conservative candidate. Although the seat was the Conservatives' second target seat across Britain, Labour increased its vote share and Russell Brown was elected as the constituency's MP.

In 2010, Duncan attempted once again to become Dumfries and Galloway's MP. However the election produced a swing against the Conservatives in the seat, and it was held by Labour's Russell Brown with a majority of 7,449 votes. The SNP's share of the vote in the constituency collapsed at the 2005 general election, and remained static in 2010. In 2015, the seat was won by the SNP's Richard Arkless with a 6,514 vote majority. The Conservative share of the vote stayed similar to the 2010 election, whereas Labour polled third, receiving 24.7% of the vote compared to 45.9% in 2010. In 2017, Alister Jack gained the seat for the Conservatives, making him one of a dozen new Scottish Conservative MPs. Jack held the seat in 2019 with a reduced majority despite increasing his vote share.

Jack stood down for the 2024 election and fellow Conservative John Cooper was elected with a further reduced majority of 930 votes (2.1%) over the SNP. Both these parties vote share fell considerably, with Labour coming just a further 1.8% behind in third place, having increased its vote share to 25.7% from 9.2% in 2019, now making the seat a genuine three-way marginal.

== Members of Parliament ==
Election	Member	Party
2005	Russell Brown	Labour
2015	Richard Arkless	SNP
2017	Alister Jack	Conservative
2024	John Cooper	Conservative

== Election results ==
=== Elections in the 2020s ===
2024 general election: Dumfries and Galloway
Party	Candidate	Votes	%	±%
Conservative	John Cooper	13,527	29.6	−14.2
SNP	Tracey Little	12,597	27.5	−13.3
Labour	James Wallace	11,767	25.7	+16.3
Reform	Charles Keal	4,313	9.4	N/A
Liberal Democrats	Iain McDonald	2,092	4.6	−1.4
Green	Laura Moodie	1,249	2.7	N/A
Heritage	David Griffiths	230	0.5	N/A
Majority		930	2.1	−0.9
Turnout		45,775	58.3	−10.0
Registered electors		78,541		
Conservative hold		Swing	−0.5	

=== Elections in the 2010s ===
2019 notional result (Note: Estimate of the 2019 general election result as if the revised boundaries recommended under the 2023 boundary review were in place)
Party	Vote	%
Conservative	22,999	43.8
SNP	21,443	40.8
Labour	4,923	9.4
Liberal Democrats	3,135	6.0
Majority	1,556	3.0
Turnout	52,500	68.3
Electorate	76,863	

2019 general election: Dumfries and Galloway
Party	Candidate	Votes	%	±%
Conservative	Alister Jack	22,678	44.1	+0.8
SNP	Richard Arkless	20,873	40.6	+8.2
Labour	Ted Thompson	4,745	9.2	−11.7
Liberal Democrats	McNabb Laurie	3,133	6.1	+3.7
Majority		1,805	3.5	−7.6
Turnout		51,429	68.7	−0.9
Registered electors		74,580		
Conservative hold		Swing	−3.7	

2017 general election: Dumfries and Galloway
Party	Candidate	Votes	%	±%
Conservative	Alister Jack	22,344	43.3	+13.4
SNP	Richard Arkless	16,701	32.4	−9.0
Labour	Daniel Goodare	10,775	20.9	−3.8
Liberal Democrats	Joan Mitchell	1,241	2.4	+0.7
Independent	Yen Hongmei Jin	538	1.0	N/A
Majority		5,643	10.9	N/A
Turnout		51,644	69.6	−5.6
Registered electors		74,206		
Conservative gain from SNP		Swing	+11.2	

2015 general election: Dumfries and Galloway
Party	Candidate	Votes	%	±%
SNP	Richard Arkless	23,440	41.4	+29.1
Conservative	Finlay Carson	16,926	29.9	−1.7
Labour	Russell Brown	13,982	24.7	−21.2
UKIP	Geoffrey Siddall	1,301	2.3	+1.0
Liberal Democrats	Andrew Metcalf	953	1.7	−7.1
Majority		6,514	11.5	N/A
Turnout		56,602	75.2	+5.2
Registered electors		75,249		
SNP gain from Labour		Swing	+25.2	

2010 general election: Dumfries and Galloway
Party	Candidate	Votes	%	±%
Labour	Russell Brown	23,950	45.9	+4.8
Conservative	Peter Duncan	16,501	31.6	−3.8
SNP	Andrew Wood	6,419	12.3	+0.2
Liberal Democrats	Richard Brodie	4,608	8.8	+0.4
UKIP	Bill Wright	695	1.3	N/A
Majority		7,449	14.3	+8.6
Turnout		52,173	70.0	+1.5
Registered electors		74,584		
Labour hold		Swing	+4.3	

=== Elections in the 2000s ===
2005 general election: Dumfries and Galloway
Party	Candidate	Votes	%	±%
Labour	Russell Brown	20,924	41.1	+8.8
Conservative	Peter Duncan	18,002	35.4	+3.4
SNP	Douglas Henderson	6,182	12.1	−14.0
Liberal Democrats	Keith Legg	4,259	8.4	−1.2
Green	John Schofield	745	1.5	N/A
Scottish Socialist	John Dennis	497	1.0	−0.8
Christian Vote	Mark Smith	282	0.6	N/A
Majority		2,922	5.7	+3.6
Turnout		50,891	69.6	+4.4
Registered electors		73,143		
Labour hold		Swing	+1.8	

2001 notional result
Party	Vote	%
Labour	15,851	32.3
Conservative	14,811	30.2
SNP	12,846	26.2
Liberal Democrats	4,677	9.5
Socialist	879	1.8
Turnout	49,064	65.1
Electorate	75,316	
