= Sonika Nirwal =

British politician (born 1977)

Personal details
- Born: 1976 (age 49–50) England
- Party: Labour
- Education: University of Cambridge

Sonika Nirwal (born 1976) was a senior Ealing Southall constituency Labour politician representing the Greenford Broadway ward. In 2006 she was elected as the leader of the Ealing Labour group, the first Asian women to have done so in British politics, and was widely expected to succeed MP Piara Khabra as the next Labour Member of Parliament for the said constituency.

== Education ==
Nirwal was a student at Dormers Wells Secondary School and went on to graduate from Cambridge University with a BA Honours in Social and Political Sciences.

== Political career ==
Nirwal became popular for her down-to-earth approach to politics and the energy with which she campaigned for local issues. She worked extensively for her ward to enable the regeneration of the town centre, and housing estates, as well to enable greater community safety.

Nirwal has been a principal consultant for the Improvement and Development Agency, where she visits councils across the country to help them improve the services they deliver to local people. She was also a board member for Ealing Hospital, a position she held for three years, and was chair for the hospital trust's quality and diversity committee.

Inspired by the Civil Rights Movement and by people of that movement like Rosa Parks, Nirwal says: "I guess my basic ethic is if you’re not happy about something you should speak up about it, not sit quietly and do nothing."

Although she lost out to being a Labour candidate for Ealing Southall, she still has aims to be a Labour MP. In 2007 she commented that: "Being the first Asian women to ever lead a political group is a great achievement and there is still more I want to achieve. I have bigger aspirations for local schools and local regeneration issues to ensure Ealing is sustainable for the future."

== Political debut and response ==
Sonika's dramatic debut on the Labour party conference platform in 1999 was later heralded as an opportunity for change. She has come to be seen as the best chance to change the face of politics in Ealing Southall, and British politics generally, by contributing to a more representative and Inclusive Democracy. However, it seems that significant work needs to be done to change perceptions in different quarters concerning political leadership. In a 2007 opinion piece on the website of a national British paper, The Guardian, Ashok Viswanathan commented

Before we relish the prospect of lambasting the political parties for their inertia in combating prejudice [associated with the lack of representation in British Politics], let us not forget the prejudice that stifles many of our young also comes from within [ethnic]communities. Pressures to confine their ambitions towards traditional careers prevents growth of talent. And the harsh truth is that those that suffer most are young women.

That is why the efforts of […]Sonika in pursuing political ambitions are to be applauded. [Hers] is a struggle against gender barriers, age barriers and race barriers, and this makes [her] progress in the scheme and [her] ongoing political successes that much more remarkable.

If we are to see more of our young, like […] Sonika, follow in the paths of our great leaders from Nairoji to Jinah and Nehru, then opportunities must open up not just in the corridors of power at Westminster, but on the doorsteps of our communities. We must do more to encourage and inspire our young - especially women - to fulfil their political aspirations, and create a more representative and inclusive democracy.

Nirwal has publicly criticised the "old boys' club" in the Ealing Southall Labour party, claiming that they represent the old guard of Southall who "did not want change."

== Controversy ==
Before the passing of Labour MP Piara Khabra, the local Labour party had agreed to implement an All-Women Shortlist (AWS) at the next general election. Khabra himself had supported a female-only selection and was quoted in the local press as having said "I can assure you the women candidates are far better." However, other, now former members of the local party, did not share the vision of having a more representative parliament and unsuccessfully campaigned against the implementation of the AWS.

Piara Khabra died at Hammersmith Hospital on 19 June 2007, his death triggering a by-election in Ealing Southall. Many commentators were surprised when the Labour Party's National Executive Committee repealed the AWS and gave its backing to two male candidates for the selection process. Of the two candidates, Norwood Green councillor Virendra Sharma received the final nomination to represent the Labour party in Ealing Southall constituency and, having won the by-election, was elected as the new MP on 19 July 2007.

Though there is uncertainty as to why the Labour Party's National Executive Committee repealed the Ealing Southall AWS, commentators of a popular blog on progressive politics have claimed the party had 'bottled it.' It is reported that fellow Labour MPs such as Fiona Mactaggart were furious with the outcome and made their views known with senior members of the party.
