= Jandiali, SBS Nagar =

Jandiali
- Village
- Location in Punjab, India Jandiali (India)
- Coordinates: 31.2011796°N 75.8111385°E
- Country: India
- State: Punjab
- District: Shaheed Bhagat Singh Nagar

Government
  - Type: Panchayat raj
  - Body: Gram panchayat
- Elevation: 251 m (823 ft)

Population (2011)
  - Total: 2,115
- Sex ratio 1115/1000 ♂/♀

Languages
  - Official: Punjabi
- Time zone: UTC+5:30 (IST)
- PIN: 144632
- Telephone code: 01884
- ISO 3166 code: IN-PB
- Post office: Chachoki
- Website: nawanshahr.nic.in

Jandiali is a village in Shaheed Bhagat Singh Nagar district of Punjab State, India. It is located 7.7 kilometres (4.8 mi) away from postal head office Chachoki, 33 kilometres (21 mi) from Nawanshahr, 30 kilometres (19 mi) from district headquarter Shaheed Bhagat Singh Nagar and 123 kilometres (76 mi) from state capital Chandigarh. The village is administrated by Sarpanch an elected representative of the village.

== Demography ==
As of 2011, Jandiali has a total number of 438 houses and population of 2115 of which 1115 include are males while 1000 are females according to the report published by Census India in 2011. The literacy rate of Jandiali is 81.39%, lower than the state average of 75.84%. The population of children under the age of 6 years is 191 which is 9.03% of total population of Jandiali, and child sex ratio is approximately 769 as compared to Punjab state average of 846.

Most of the people are from Schedule Caste which constitutes 62.65% of total population in Jandiali. The town does not have any Schedule Tribe population so far.

As per the report published by Census India in 2011, 778 people were engaged in work activities out of the total population of Jandiali which includes 630 males and 148 females. According to census survey report 2011, 82.26% workers describe their work as main work and 17.74% workers are involved in Marginal activity providing livelihood for less than 6 months.

== Education ==
The village has Punjabi medium, primary school for girls founded in 1958 and a primary school for boys founded in 1936. The schools provide mid-day meal as per Indian Midday Meal Scheme. The school provide free education to children between the ages of 6 and 14 as per Right of Children to Free and Compulsory Education Act. Sikh National college is the nearest colleges and Lovely Professional University is 14.4 kilometres (8.9 mi) away from the village.

== Transport ==
Mandhali railway station is the nearest train station, However, Phagwara Junction train station is 7.6 kilometres (4.7 mi) away from the village. Sahnewal Airport is the nearest domestic airport located 53 kilometres (33 mi) away in Ludhiana and the nearest international airport is located in Chandigarh also Sri Guru Ram Dass Jee International Airport is the second nearest airport which is 124 kilometres (77 mi) away in Amritsar.

== See also ==
- List of villages in India
- Mandali caste
