= List of MPs for constituencies in Northern Ireland (2005–2010) =

- May 5, 2005
- Colours on map indicate the party allegiance of each constituency's MP.

This is a list of members of Parliament (MPs) elected to the House of Commons by constituencies in Northern Ireland for the Fifty-Fourth Parliament of the United Kingdom (2005 to 2010).

It includes both MPs elected at the 2005 general election, held on 5 May 2005, and those subsequently elected in by-elections.

The list is sorted by the name of the MP, and MPs who did not serve throughout the Parliament are italicised. New MPs elected since the general election are noted at the bottom of the page.

Sinn Féin MPs choose not to take up their seats in the House of Commons.

== Composition ==
Affiliation	Members
DUP	9
Sinn Féin	5
SDLP	3
Ulster Unionist	1
Total	18

== MPs ==
MP	Constituency	Party	In constituency since	First elected
Gerry Adams	Belfast West	Sinn Féin	1997	1983
Gregory Campbell	East Londonderry	DUP	2001	2001
Nigel Dodds	Belfast North	DUP	2001	2001
Pat Doherty	West Tyrone	Sinn Féin	2001	2001
Jeffrey Donaldson	Lagan Valley	DUP	1997	1997
Mark Durkan	Foyle	SDLP	2005	2005
Michelle Gildernew	Fermanagh and South Tyrone	Sinn Féin	2001	2001
Sylvia, Lady Hermon	North Down	UUP	2001	2001
William McCrea	South Antrim	DUP	2005	1983
Alasdair McDonnell	Belfast South	SDLP	2005	2005
Eddie McGrady	South Down	SDLP	1987	1987
Martin McGuinness	Mid Ulster	Sinn Féin	1997	1997
Conor Murphy	Newry and Armagh	Sinn Féin	2005	2005
Ian Paisley	North Antrim	DUP	1970	1970
Iris Robinson	Strangford	DUP	2001	2001
Peter Robinson	Belfast East	DUP	1979	1979
David Simpson	Upper Bann	DUP	2005	2005
Sammy Wilson	East Antrim	DUP	2005	2005

== See also ==
- Results of the 2005 United Kingdom general election
- List of MPs elected in the 2005 United Kingdom general election
- List of MPs for English constituencies 2005-2010
- List of MPs for Scottish constituencies 2005–2010
- List of MPs for Welsh constituencies 2005-2010
- List of Democratic Unionist Party MPs 2005-2010
- List of United Kingdom Labour MPs 2005-
- List of United Kingdom Labour and Labour Co-operative MPs 2005-
- List of United Kingdom Labour Co-operative MPs 2005-
- List of United Kingdom Conservative MPs 2005-
- List of United Kingdom Liberal Democrat MPs 2005-
- Category:UK MPs 2005-2010
