= Rauza Mandhali Sharif =

Sufiyana Darbar shrine in Mandhali village, Punjab, India

Roza Sharif Mandhali
- Successor: Umre Shah Qadri
- Founded: 1785
- Founder: Sayed ul Shaikh Hazrat Abdullah Shah Qadri
- Location: Mandhali, Phagwara, Punjab, India

Rauza Sharif Mandhali Darbar is a Sufiyana Darbar shrine located in Mandhali village, nearby Phagwara, Punjab, India.

The Darbar or known as Roza is a Sufi Muslim place of worship. People from different castes and religions come to pay their respects. This Rauza is a Sufi Muslim Dargah. There is an old story that with the miracle of Abdullah Shah Qadri the train started to stop in the village, Kultham. That is why the railway station is called "Baba Abdulla Shah Kadri Railway Station Kultham" to this day. After Abdullah Shah the Roza was looked after by Fateh Shah, Gulami Shah, Ali Ahmed Shah and Baba Nur Shah. There are three melas that are held every year which are led under the guidance of Umre Shah Qadri. There is a urs mela (Death anniversary) of Baba Abdullah Shah Qadri which is held for 5 days which takes place on 29 June to 3 July. There is also a three-day urs Mela (Death anniversary) of Ali Ahmed Shah Qadri which is held on 12 December to 14 December. The third Mela is held at Banga Darbar (Shrine of Gulami Shah, Banga) which is held for three days on 12 September to 14 September. Various singers and qawwals perform during these melas. Many singers such as Kuldeep Manak, Hans Raj Hans, Gurdas Maan, Sardool Sikander, Jazzy B, Lakhwinder Wadali, Balwinder Safri, Nooran Sisters, Buta Mohammad, Sabar Koti, Master Saleem, Masha Ali and Feroz Khan have performed. Many qawwals such as Munawar Ali Shafi Taqi, Hamsar Hayat, Sardar Ali, Shakeel Sabri, Karamat Ali Fakeer, Shaulat Ali Matoi and many more also perform.

== About ==
The Rauza Mandhali Sharif Darbar is a Sufi shrine located in Mandhali village and is also known as the Makkah of Punjab. This pilgrimage site consists of the main tomb belonging to Abdullah Shah Qadri. Hazrat came from Saudi Arabia, settled in Punjab and is now buried in Mandhali Sharif. Ali Ahmed Shah Qadri, Bibi Karma, Bhajan Shah Qadri and Gulam Baqi Bille Shah Qadri are also buried in the complex of the Rauza, along with graves of other sewadars of the Rauza in the complex. Gaddi Nashin:

- Sayed ul Shaykh Hazrat Abdullah Shah Qadri
- Ali Ahmed Shah Qadri
- Bhajan Shah Qadri
- Gulam Baqi Bille Shah Qadri
- Umre Shah Qadri(Present)

Ali Ahmed Shah Qadri was the maternal uncle and guru of Bhajan Shah Qadri. Bhajan Shah Qadri was visited by a westerner who was an author, Hugh Johnston who described as a 'good looking man... wearing an elaborately embroidered, full length black and golden kaftan.' Bhajan Shah Qadri was well known for his long shoulder-length hair and had an enchanting face.

Thursday is the most crowded day to visit this shrine as it is considered a special day within Sufism.

== History ==
During the partition of India (1947), most of the sewadars of the Darbar settled in Pakistan. There is a twin Darbar in Pakistan which also has the name Mandhali Sharif Darbar. Before partition, Kaly Shah and Ali Ahmed looked after the Sangat that attended the Darbar. Kaly Shah settled in Pakistan while Ali Ahmed stayed in Mandhali and continued to look after the Rauza. After Ali Ahmed Shah Qadri's unexpected death, Bhajan Shah Qadri became gaddi nashin of the darbar in 1985.

Umre Shah Qadri is the current gaddi nashin of the Darbar. Lakhwinder Wadali is also a disciple of Sai and attends the Darbar frequently and often does Sewa at the darbar.
