= Avtar Lit =

British businessman (1950–2023)

Avtar Singh Lit (7 April 1950 – 27 June 2023) was a British businessman who was the owner and chairman of Sunrise Radio Group. He was listed by AIM magazine as one of the "20 most powerful Asians in British media" in 2005, and was said to have amassed a big personal fortune. He was declared bankrupt by the High Court in 2014, having lost five companies which went into administration.

== Political ambitions ==
Avtar Lit stood unsuccessfully as an Independent candidate for the Ealing Southall parliamentary constituency in the 2001 General Election, finishing third of nine candidates, with 12.3% of the vote. Sunrise Radio carried extracts from an interview with him in advance of this, contrary to section 90(2)(b) of the Broadcasting Act 1990; the Radio Authority (now Ofcom) fined Sunrise Radio £10,000. Avtar Lit's son, Surinderpal Singh Lit, commonly known as Tony Lit, stood, also unsuccessfully, as a candidate in the 2007 Ealing Southall by-election as the Conservative candidate, also finishing third.

== Controversy ==
In 2011, it was reported in The Guardian that £160,000 donated by Sunrise Radio listeners in support of victims of the 2004 Indian Ocean earthquake and tsunami and 2005 Kashmir earthquake was not spent on the victims as had been intended with the campaign, but "left dormant in a bank account for almost seven years", it being judged by the Charities Commission that although there was "no evidence to suggest that the funds were at risk of misapplication", the account's trustees "did not act appropriately", and had "failed to provide a sufficient satisfactory explanation or provide evidence to give reason for their delay". The money was subsequently given to two registered charities working in the affected areas. Virendra Sharma, Labour MP for Ealing and Southall, demanded that an explanation be provided by the trustees. A spokesman for the Disasters Emergency Committee, whilst supporting the trustees' "good intentions", observed that these were not enough and a "clear plan and procedures to ensure you will be able to spend the money you raise in a timely, effective and transparent fashion" were required in such circumstances.

In 2007, Lit was embroiled in what Joan Ryan, Labour MP and vice-chair, called "breathtaking and naked Tory opportunism" in the course of "David Cameron's personal intervention to overrule local Tories and appoint a candidate"; The Guardian reported that Lit's son, Tony, Cameron's "star candidate" viewed as "a new type of Tory: young, successful, metropolitan" and who, it was hoped, would "deliver a blow to Gordon Brown by winning the contest", attended with his family a farewell dinner for Tony Blair at the cost of £4,800- spending an additional £4,000 in a bid for "a weekend trip to Atlanta, the highlight of which was two seats at a dinner with Hillary Clinton"- despite being announced as the Conservative candidate for the Ealing Southall by-election the next week. The Labour party released photographs of Lit and Blair, and made it known that the £4,000 bid had not been paid, questioning whether this was due to the fact that "the Lits wanted to avoid all this coming out in the run-up to the election".

== Personal life and death ==
Lit was born on 7 April 1950. He lived in Osterley, in a house estimated to be worth £2.5 million- sold in 2022 for £3,650,000- and was a father of 5.

Lit died on 27 June 2023, at the age of 73.
