= Khabra =

Khabra is a surname. Notable people with the surname include:

- Ajay Khabra (born 1995), Canadian soccer player and coach
- Harmanjot Singh Khabra (born 1988), Indian footballer
- Piara Khabra (1921–2007), British–Indian politician
