= Deirdre Costigan =

UK politician

Deirdre Costigan MP
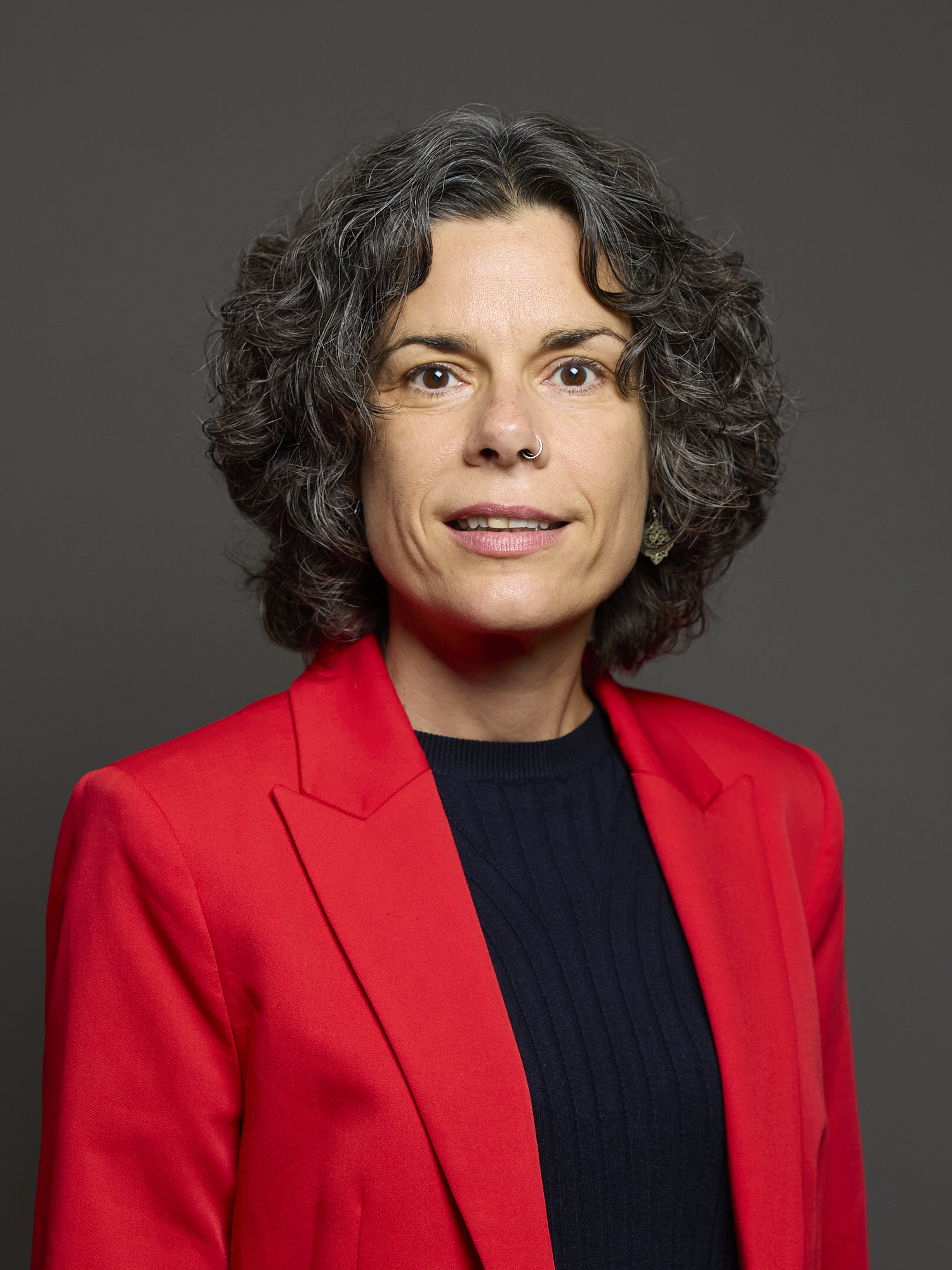
- Official portrait, 2024

Lord Commissioner of the Treasury
- In office 12 May 2026 – 22 July 2026
- Prime Minister: Keir Starmer

Member of Parliament for Ealing Southall
- Incumbent
- Assumed office 4 July 2024
- Preceded by: Virendra Sharma
- Majority: 15,793 (33.7%)

Member of Ealing London Borough Council for Northolt Mandeville
- In office 3 May 2018 – 6 September 2024

Personal details
- Born: Deirdre Theresa Costigan Dublin, Ireland
- Party: Labour

Deirdre Theresa Costigan is an Irish-born British politician and trade unionist, who has been the Labour Party Member of Parliament (MP) for Ealing Southall in the United Kingdom House of Commons since 2024.

== Early career ==
Costigan was born in Dublin, Ireland, and immigrated to London in the 1990s. She was a shop steward for the trade union Unison. Before her election as an MP, she was Unison's national officer for disability equality.

== Political career ==
In 2018, Costigan was elected as a Labour councillor for the Northolt Mandeville ward of Ealing London Borough Council. She was re-elected in 2022. She served as deputy leader of the council for the three years preceding her election in 2024 as an MP.

In the 2024 general election, Costigan was elected the Member of parliament (MP) for Ealing Southall with 23,000 votes (49.1%) and a majority of 15,793 over the second place Conservative candidate. On 18 July 2024, she made her maiden speech during a debate on foreign affairs and defence.

In the September 2025 cabinet reshuffle, Costigan was appointed to the ministerial position of assistant government whip. On 12 May 2026, she was appointed junior lord of the treasury (government whip) following mass resignations from the government.

== Personal life ==
Costigan is lesbian.
