= List of Democratic Unionist Party MPs (2005–2010) =

This is a list of members of Parliament (MPs) elected to the House of Commons for the Democratic Unionist Party (DUP) for the Fifty-Fourth Parliament of the United Kingdom (2005–2010).

It includes both MPs elected at the 2005 general election, held on 5 May 2005, and those subsequently elected in by-elections.

The list is sorted by the name of the MP, and MPs who did not serve throughout the Parliament are italicised. New MPs elected since the general election are noted at the bottom of the page.

== MPs ==
| MP | Constituency | In constituency since | First entered Parliament |
|---|---|---|---|
| Gregory Campbell | East Londonderry | 2001 | 2001 |
| Nigel Dodds | Belfast North | 2001 | 2001 |
| Jeffrey Donaldson | Lagan Valley | 1997 | 1997 |
| William McCrea | South Antrim | 2005 | 1983 |
| Ian Paisley | North Antrim | 1970 | 1970 |
| Iris Robinson | Strangford | 2001 | 2001 |
| Peter Robinson | Belfast East | 1979 | 1979 |
| David Simpson | Upper Bann | 2005 | 2005 |
| Sammy Wilson | East Antrim | 2005 | 2005 |

== See also ==
- Results of the 2005 United Kingdom general election
- List of MPs elected in the 2005 United Kingdom general election
- Category:UK MPs 2005-2010
