= Mandhali =

- Village
- Location in Punjab, India Mandhali (India)
- Coordinates: 31.1928783°N 75.8253407°E
- Country: India
- State: Punjab
- District: Shaheed Bhagat Singh Nagar

Government
  - Type: Panchayat raj
  - Body: Gram panchayat
- Elevation: 251 m (823 ft)

Population (2011)
  - Total: 1,655
- Sex ratio 916/739 ♂/♀

Languages
  - Official: Punjabi
- Time zone: UTC+5:30 (IST)
- PIN: 144501
- Telephone code: 01884
- ISO 3166 code: IN-PB
- Post office: Kultham
- Website: nawanshahr.nic.in

Mandhali or Mandali is a village in Shaheed Bhagat Singh Nagar district of Punjab State, India. It is located 1.7 kilometres (1.1 mi) away from postal head office Kultham, 8 kilometres (5.0 mi) from Phagwara, 28 kilometres (17 mi) from district headquarter Shaheed Bhagat Singh Nagar and 120 kilometres (75 mi) from state capital Chandigarh. The village is administrated by Sarpanch an elected representative of the village.

== Demography ==
As of 2011, Mandhali has a total number of 328 houses and population of 1655 of which 916 include are males while 739 are females according to the report published by Census India in 2011. The literacy rate of Mandhali is 59.93%, lower than the state average of 75.84%. The population of children under the age of 6 years is 170 which is 10.27% of total population of Mandhali, and child sex ratio is approximately 635 as compared to Punjab state average of 846.

Most of the people are from Schedule Caste which constitutes 30.15% of total population in Mandhali. The town does not have any Schedule Tribe population so far.

As per the report published by Census India in 2011, 924 people were engaged in work activities out of the total population of Mandhali which includes 546 males and 378 females. According to census survey report 2011, 62.77% workers describe their work as main work and 37.23% workers are involved in Marginal activity providing livelihood for less than 6 months.

== Education ==
The village has a Punjabi medium, co-ed upper primary with secondary/higher secondary school founded in 1962. The schools provide mid-day meal as per Indian Midday Meal Scheme. The school provide free education to children between the ages of 6 and 14 as per Right of Children to Free and Compulsory Education Act. Sikh National college is the nearest colleges and Lovely Professional University is 17 kilometres (11 mi) away from the village.

== Landmarks and history ==
The village has a mausoleum called Rauza Mandhali Sharif. It has the tomb of Sayed-ul-Shaykh Hazrat Abdullah Shah Qadri which was built by himself. A fair is held at the Rauza in the month of June and July every year which is attended by people of all religions, castes and cultures. The mausoleum also has the tombs of Ali Ahmed Shah Qadri, Bhajan Shah Qadri and Gulam Bille Shah. Umre Shah Qadri is the present head of the shrine.

== Transport ==
Kultham Baba Abdullah Shah railway station is the nearest train station, However, Phagwara Junction train station is 10 kilometres (6.2 mi) away from the village. Sahnewal Airport is the nearest domestic airport located 55 kilometres (34 mi) away in Ludhiana and the nearest international airport is located in Chandigarh also Sri Guru Ram Dass Jee International Airport is the second nearest airport which is 125 kilometres (78 mi) away in Amritsar.

== See also ==
- List of villages in India
- Mandali caste
