= Tony Lit =

British-Indian politician and managing director of Sunrise Radio

Tony Lit MBE is a British-Indian politician and managing director of Sunrise Radio. He was appointed MBE in the 2019 New Year Honours for services to the British-Asian community.

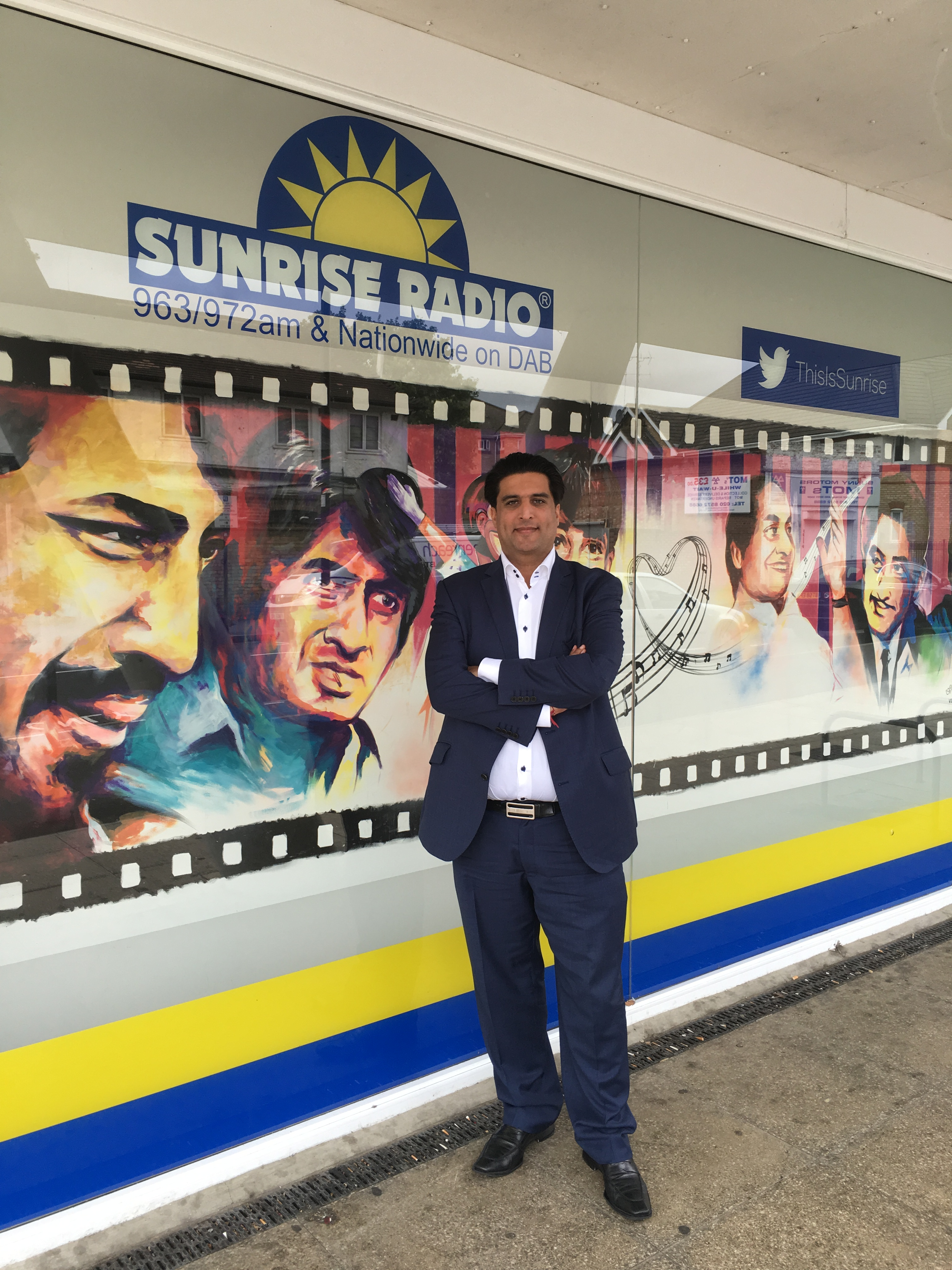
Tony Lit MBE, MD Sunrise Radio

Lit has worked in radio, TV and events. Based at Sunrise Radio Hounslow office he works with Chairman Gurdev Jassi, building on Sunrise Radio's recent success, overseeing strategy and revenue growth.

Lit joined Sunrise Radio from Sony Entertainment TV Asia where he was Vice President Business Head UK & Europe Sony Entertainment Network three Channels. During his time at Sony, Lit was instrumental in the last few years of business success at the network, across sales & channel distribution and expansion of the network of channels distributed via Talk Talk & Virgin in the UK and across many other platforms in Europe.

The inaugural British Asian Media (BAM) Awards saw the media fraternity come together to celebrate and felicitate diversity and campaigns which empower the South Asian media industry. The Media Impact of the Year Award was conferred upon Lit for his contribution to the British Asian media industry in January 2019.

Lit and British prime minister Boris Johnson attended Milton Keynes Gurdwara ahead of Diwali and to celebrate the auspicious 550th Birth Anniversary of Sri Guru Nanak Dev Ji.

Lit addressed at the Drive to Digital 2019 Conference held on 30 October at The British Library Knowledge Centre, giving them a background of Sunrise Radio from launch in 1989 to present day and how digital innovation had allowed him to grow and develop Sunrise Radio nationally.

Lit was officially unveiled as a new Ambassador for CRY on 21 January 2020. Tony first approached CRY following the sudden death of the only son of a family friend from a previously undiagnosed heart condition. He was aged just 17 and was a fit and sporty young man, with his death sending shockwaves throughout his local community and beyond. As a father of 3, Tony was deeply moved by this tragedy and pledged, “whatever support Sunrise Radio and I can give personally, over and above, I shall do so.”

Tony Lit was named the 'Outstanding Sikh Award' winner at the British Sikh Awards 2023.

Asian Standard News recognized Tony Lit as one of the most influential figures in London for the year 2023.

Tony Lit had the opportunity to interview the first British Asian prime minister, Rishi Sunak, at 10 Downing Street for Sunrise Radio.

Tony Lit won Interview of the Year 2025 at the British Asian Media Awards for his exclusive interview with former British prime minister Rishi Sunak at Number 10 Downing Street in May 2024 — marking a first for British Asian Media in securing access to a sitting prime minister.

== Personal life ==
Lit is the son of businessman Avtar Lit, and is a British-Indian Sikh. He and his wife Mandy have three children and live in Ham within Richmond, South-West London.

== Political career ==
Lit was the Conservative Party candidate in the 2007 Ealing Southall by-election, following in the footsteps of his father, who had stood for the seat as an Independent in 2001. Lit Jr. finished third of twelve candidates, with 22.5% of the vote.
