= 2007 Ealing Southall by-election =

UK parliamentary by-election

- 19 July 2007

Constituency of Ealing Southall
- Turnout: 42.9%
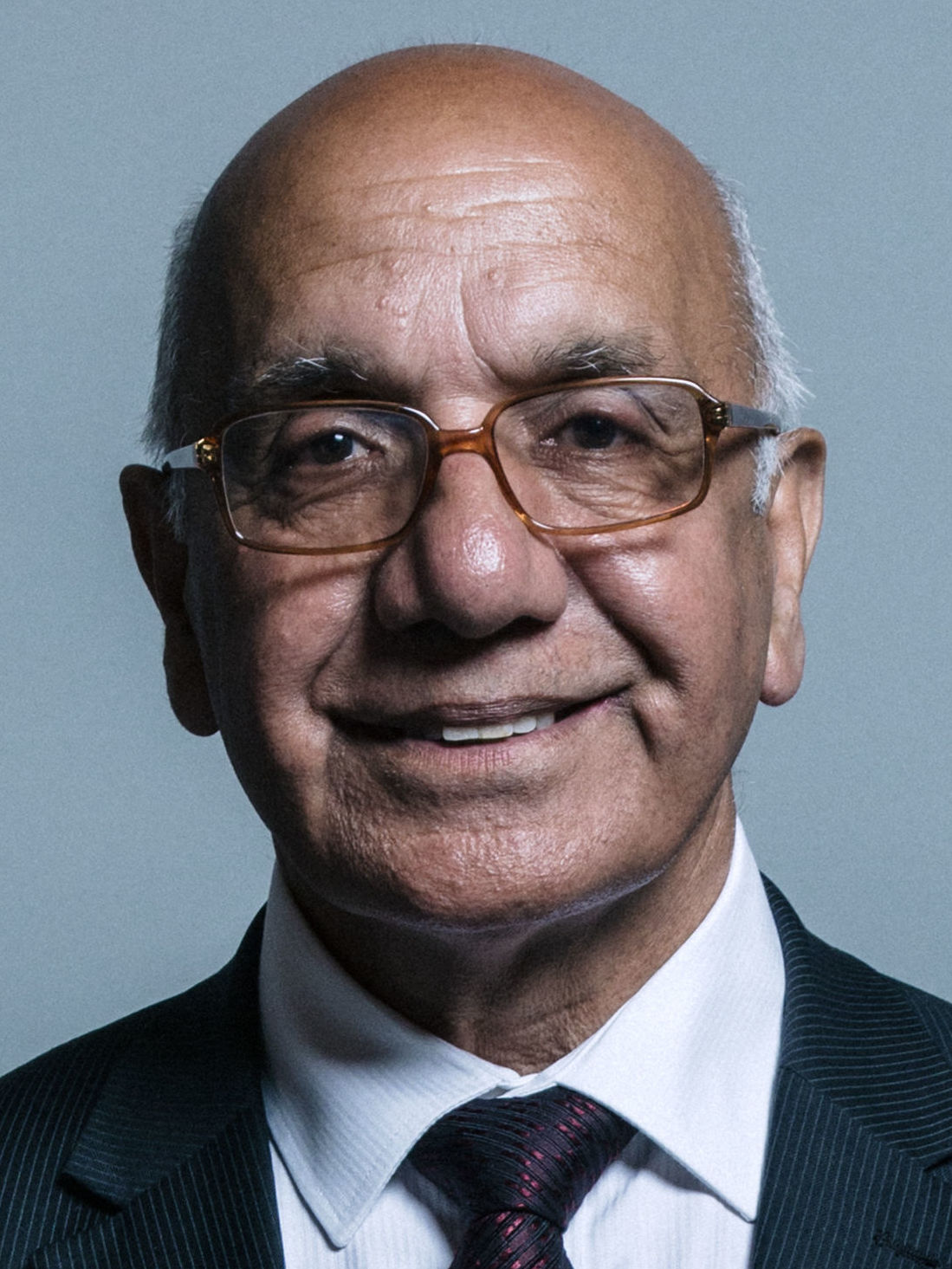

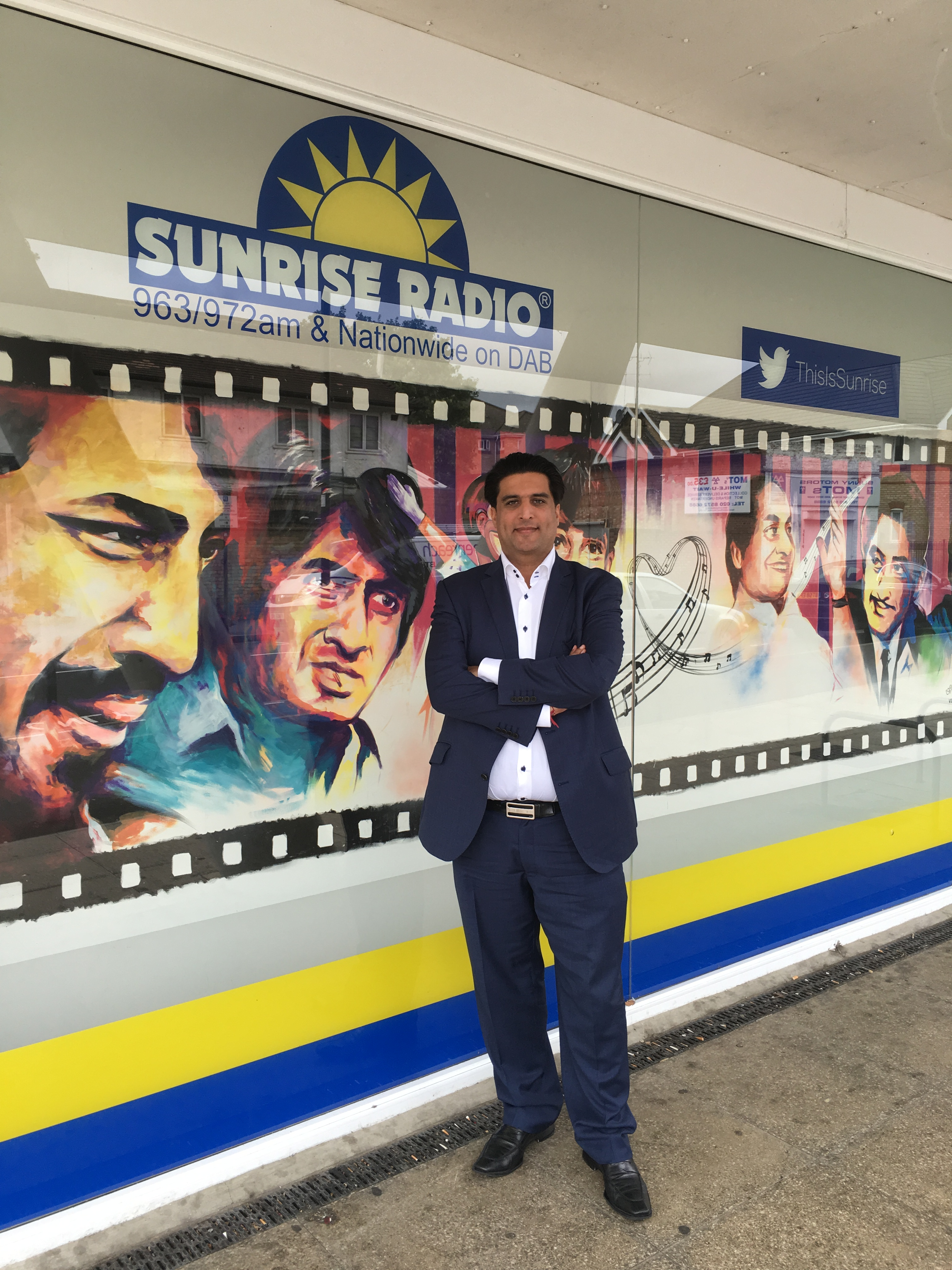
	First party	Second party	Third party
		LD
Candidate	Virendra Sharma	Nigel Bakhai	Tony Lit
Party	Labour	Liberal Democrats	Conservative
Popular vote	15,188	10,118	8,230
Percentage	41.5%	27.7%	22.5%
Swing	▼7.3%	▲3.3%	▲0.9%
MP before election
Piara Khabra
Labour
Elected MP
Virendra Sharma
Labour

A by-election for the United Kingdom parliamentary constituency of Ealing Southall was held on 19 July 2007, triggered by the death of incumbent Labour Party member of Parliament (MP) Piara Khabra. It was won by Virendra Sharma, who held the seat for Labour.

It took place on the same day as the 2007 Sedgefield by-election which was initiated by the resignation of recently-departed Prime Minister Tony Blair; they were the first by-elections to be held during the premiership of the new Prime Minister, Gordon Brown.

== Background and candidates ==
Incumbent Labour MP Piara Khabra died on 19 June 2007; he had served as MP since 1992. The writ to trigger a by-election was moved on 28 June, the day after the Khabra's funeral. Labour had held the seat since its creation in 1983, and the predecessor seat of Southall since it was created before 1945.

Labour selected local councillor Virendra Sharma from a shortlist of two – with Jo Sidhu the other shortlisted candidate. As Khabra had previously announced his intention to stand down at the next UK general election, Labour had already decided on its selection rules and had chosen to have an all-women shortlist for the constituency at the next UK general election, but following Khabra's death, the Labour National Executive Committee decided the by-election selection would not be from an all-women shortlist. Following the selection, five Labour councillors defected to the Conservative Party.

The Liberal Democrats selected Nigel Bakhai as their candidate; he contested the constituency in 2005 and came second. The party fared worse than expected nationally at the 2007 United Kingdom local elections, and several newspapers claimed the Ealing Southall by-election would be a major test of Menzies Campbell's leadership, with a poor result potentially leading to a leadership challenge. The Independent also claimed the party regarded the Ealing Southall election as winnable, and were focussing resources on the seat, in preference to the Sedgefield by-election, to be held the same day.

The Conservative Party selected Surinderpal Singh Lit – commonly known as Tony Lit – as its candidate. He is the former Managing Director of Sunrise Radio and son of Avtar Lit who contested the constituency as an independent candidate in the 2001 election and came third. The deputy chair of the local Conservatives, Brij Mohan Gupta, resigned from the party in protest at Lit's selection and endorsed Quentin Davies' criticisms of David Cameron's policies, joining instead the Liberal Democrats. Newspapers reported that Tony Lit attended a Labour Party fundraising event and Sunrise donated £4,800 to Labour in June 2007, before he switched allegiance to the Conservatives later that month. On the ballot paper, Lit was described as "David Cameron's Conservative" while the Sedgefield candidate was simply "Conservative".

Several other candidates stood. The Respect party selected local teacher Salvinder Dhillon as its candidate; he previously contested the seat as an independent in 2001. The UK Independence Party announced Indian-born Dr K. T. Rajan as its candidate. He had previously stood for the party in various Welsh Assembly seats. The Green Party selected their 2005 candidate, Sarah Edwards.

John Cartwright ran for the Official Monster Raving Loony Party, having stood repeatedly in Croydon Central and also at the 2006 Bromley and Chislehurst by-election. The English Democrats chose Sati Chagger as their candidate. Meanwhile, Yaqub Masih, General Secretary of UK Asian Christian Fellowship and a presenter on Sunrise Radio is stood for the Christian Party. Local GP Gulbash Singh, Director of the Sikh Human Rights Group Jasdev Singh Rai and Kuldeep Singh Grewal all stood as independents.

The BBC report that independent candidates Kuldeep Singh Grewal urged his supporters to vote Labour, while Golbash Singh called on his supporters to vote Conservative, on 19 July. Due to electoral law the two men are not permitted to remove themselves from the ballot paper and still attracted votes.

== Controversy ==
On 18 July 2007, the Metropolitan Police launched an investigation after receiving a complaint in writing from Labour's election agent Ken Clarke. It related to a The Daily Telegraph website blog entry, posted on 17 July, which claimed to show the results of the postal voting ahead of the ballot. The article on the Daily Telegraph website quoted "a source inside the Tory campaign". In response, a spokesman for the Conservative Party said: "Our agent in Ealing Southall hasn't published any such information or spoken to the Daily Telegraph."

The Telegraph Media Group said the blog entry was removed as soon as they were told it could breach electoral law. The Metropolitan Police said the complaint would be "thoroughly investigated" and "appropriate action taken".

The Director of Public Prosecutions has also been asked by Labour to probe claims that the Liberal Democrats misrepresented Labour candidate Virendra Sharma in their election leaflets by listing his age as 72, when at the time of the election he was 60.

== Result ==
2007 Ealing Southall by-election
Party	Candidate	Votes	%	±%
Labour	Virendra Sharma	15,188	41.5	–7.3
Liberal Democrats	Nigel Bakhai	10,118	27.7	+3.3
Conservative	Tony Lit	8,230	22.5	+0.9
Green	Sarah Edwards	1,135	3.1	–1.5
Respect	Salvinder Dhillon	588	1.6	New
UKIP	K. T. Rajan	285	0.8	New
Christian Vote	Yaqub Masih	280	0.8	New
Independent	Jasdev Rai	275	0.8	New
Monster Raving Loony	John Cartwright	188	0.5	New
English Democrat	Sati Chaggar	152	0.4	New
Independent	Gulbash Singh	92	0.3	New
Independent	Kuldeep Grewal	87	0.2	New
Majority		5,070	13.8	–10.5
Turnout		36,618	42.9	–13.3
Registered electors		85,262		
Labour hold		Swing	–5.4	

According to the Elections Office of Ealing Council, the electorate was 85,423 which represented an increase of 1,685 (2%) on the 2005 general election.

== Previous result ==
General election 2005: Ealing Southall
Party	Candidate	Votes	%	±%
Labour	Piara Khabra	22,937	48.8	+1.3
Liberal Democrats	Nigel Bakhai	11,497	24.4	+14.4
Conservative	Mark D.Y. Nicholson	10,147	21.6	+3.3
Green	Sarah J. Edwards	2,175	4.6	+0.1
Workers Revolutionary	Malkiat Bilku	289	0.6	New
Majority		11,440	24.3	–4.9
Turnout		47,045	56.2	–0.6
Registered electors		83,246		
Labour hold		Swing	–6.6	
