= Piara Khabra =

British politician (1921–2007)

Piara Khabra JP
- ਪਿਆਰਾ ਖਾਬੜਾ
- Official portrait, 2005

Member of Parliament for Ealing Southall
- In office 9 April 1992 – 19 June 2007
- Preceded by: Syd Bidwell
- Succeeded by: Virendra Sharma

Personal details
- Born: Piara Singh Khabra; 20 November 1921 Punjab, British India
- Died: 19 June 2007 (aged 85) White City, London, England
- Party: Labour (1972–81; from 1988)
- Other political affiliations: Communist Party of India (1950s); CPGB (1960s); SDP (1981–83)
- Spouses: Name unknown (died 1985) Beulah Marian (m. 1990)
- Children: 1
- Education: Khalsa High School
- Alma mater: Panjab University
- Profession: Social worker; teacher

Military service
- Branch/service: British Indian Army
- Years of service: 1942–1946
- Battles/wars: World War II

Piara Singh Khabra JP (Punjabi: ਪਿਆਰਾ ਸਿੰਘ ਖਾਬੜਾ; 20 November 1921 – 19 June 2007) was a Punjabi-British Labour politician who served as Member of Parliament (MP) for Ealing Southall from 1992 until his death. He was the fifth British Asian, and the first Sikh, to become a British MP.

From the retirement of Sir Edward Heath in 2001 until his death, Khabra was the oldest MP sitting in the House of Commons, and was the last sitting MP to have served in the Commonwealth's forces during the Second World War.

== Background ==
Piara Singh Khabra was born into a Punjabi Sikh farming family of the Khabra clan in the Punjab Province of British India. Khabra gave his year of birth as 1924, but his marriage certificate dated it as 1921.

He joined the Communist Party of India, and became a teacher in an elementary school. He requalified in 1964, becoming an elementary teacher and then a social worker. He also became the President of the Indian Workers' Association, which assisted Indian immigrants to establish themselves and find jobs, and was active in opposition to the far right.

He left the Communist Party of Great Britain (CPGB) in the 1960s, and joined the Labour Party in 1972. He became a justice of the peace in 1977, and was elected as a member of Ealing Council in 1978. He briefly joined the Social Democratic Party (SDP) in 1981, leaving two years later and returning to Labour in 1988.

== Parliamentary career ==
He entered Parliament aged 70 at the 1992 election, the fifth Asian MP and inherited a large majority in the safe Labour seat of Ealing Southall, following Labour's de-selection of the long-serving sitting MP Sydney Bidwell. He claimed to have the largest caseload of immigration and asylum cases of any MP. He maintained good attendance and voting records, but very rarely spoke in Parliament. He said he was proud to speak on the report into the murder of Stephen Lawrence, and on the Race Relations Amendment Act 2000.

Khabra was a strong supporter of people with autism spectrum disorders. He sponsored one of the most successful early day motions on autism in the 2002 Autism Awareness Year; it was supported by 153 parliamentarians of all parties. Khabra backed the work of the Autism Awareness Campaign UK.

How Khabra voted on key issues from 2001 to 2007:

- Voted very strongly for the Iraq War
- Voted very strongly for university tuition fees
- Voted very strongly for Labour's anti-terrorism laws
- Voted very strongly for introducing ID cards
- Voted very strongly for replacing Trident
- Voted very strongly for the hunting ban
- Voted strongly for equal LGBT rights
- Voted strongly for a stricter asylum system
- Voted for more EU integration
- Voted moderately for laws to stop climate change
- Voted moderately for introducing foundation hospitals
- Voted moderately for a smoking ban
- Voted moderately for removing hereditary peers from the House of Lords
- Voted a mixture of for and against greater autonomy for schools
- Voted moderately against a wholly elected House of Lords
- Voted very strongly against an investigation into the Iraq War

== Controversy ==
Khabra was known to have made several controversial statements. In the run-up to the 2001 general election, he suggested that Avtar Lit, chairman of Sunrise Radio and an independent challenger for his seat, should be "sent back to India".

In 2002, Khabra also claimed that the local Somali population was behind a recent crime wave in Southall. Somali activists responded to these criticisms by suggesting that their community was being targeted by some Asians who were attempting to drive them out of the area. Ealing Police also indicated that they did not believe Somali youths were responsible for the string of street robberies in question.

== Retirement and death ==
In late 2006, Khabra announced that he would stand down at the next general election.

Khabra died as a result of liver problems on the night of 19 June 2007 at Hammersmith Hospital in White City within Shepherd's Bush, West London; where he had been being treated for abscesses on the liver since April.

He customarily gave his year of birth as 1924; birth registration was not compulsory in the Indian state of Punjab until 1970 and so no birth certificate exists, but on his marriage certificate his year of birth was recorded as 1921.

He was married twice. His first wife died in 1985 in Canada where she was living with his son, and he remarried in 1990. He was survived by his second wife, Beulah Marian, and his son from his first marriage.

Parliament of the United Kingdom
Preceded by Syd Bidwell	Member of Parliament for Ealing Southall; 1992–2007	Succeeded by Virendra Sharma
Records
Preceded by Sir Edward Heath	Oldest sitting Member of Parliament; 2001–2007	Succeeded by Ian Paisley
