= Ealing Southall =

UK Parliament constituency (since 1983)

Coordinates: 51.505°N 0.354°W

- Borough constituency for the House of Commons
- Interactive map of boundaries from 2024
- Location within Greater London
- County: Greater London
- Electorate: 75,085 (March 2020)
- Major settlements: Southall, Norwood Green, Northfields, Dormers Wells, Hanwell

Current constituency
- Created: 1983
- Member of Parliament: Deirdre Costigan (Labour)
- Seats: One
- Created from: Southall

Ealing Southall is a constituency (Note: A borough constituency (for the purposes of election expenses and type of returning officer)) created in 1983 and represented in the House of Commons of the UK Parliament since 2024 by Deirdre Costigan of the Labour Party. (Note: As with all constituencies, the constituency elects one Member of Parliament (MP) by the first past the post system of election at least every five years.)

== Constituency profile ==
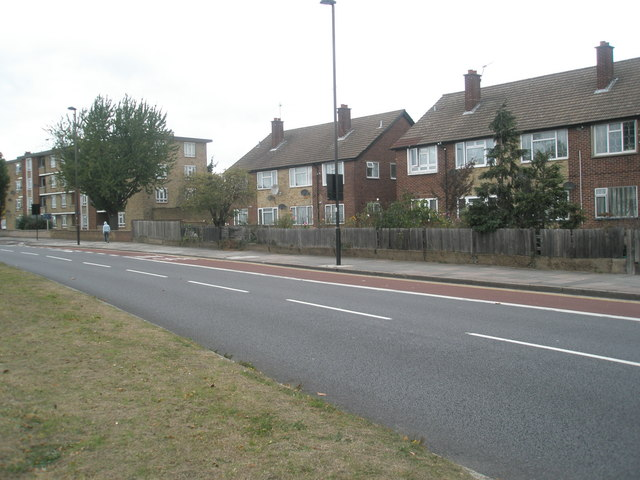
The majority of Ealing Southall's housing is little-embellished low-rise, where private gardens and rooms tend to be smaller than the central part of the London Borough of Ealing

The constituency has relatively good road and rail transport, and numerous small to medium-size green spaces, and has had as many as three tube stations at its eastern extremes of its boundaries.

Southall and Norwood Green, forming the western bulk of the seat, feature a high British Asian proportion of the population since the 1960s. In 1966, 10.6% of the constituency were born in the New Commonwealth. In 1971, 25.4% were non-White. In 1981, 43.7% of the constituency were non-White. The constituency had the highest concentration of those born in India (16.3% of the population) in 1981.

British Indian ethnicity is the largest single ethnic group. British Asians account for 51% of the population, as at the 2011 census, the majority of this minority is of Indian ethnicity (29.6%), with significant Hindu and Muslim populations, with the highest number of Sikh residents in any constituency in Britain at over 20%. The Afro-Caribbean community amounts to 8% according to the latest census statistics. The seat has generally modest incomes and the vast majority of housing is modest terraced, semi-detached or mid-rise 20th century blocks of flats. The east of the seat is formed by Hanwell and West Ealing.

Ealing Southall
- Interactive map of Ealing Southall

Religion (2021)
  - Christian: 28.7%
  - Sikh: 21.1%
  - Muslim: 20.5%
  - No religion: 12.3%
  - Hindu: 11.0%
  - Not answered: 5.0%
  - Other: 0.7%
  - Buddhist: 0.6%
  - Jewish: 0.1%

== Political history ==
The seat has been served by three successive Labour Party MPs since its inception in 1983, with majorities ranging between 13.8% and 49% of the vote; the latter was achieved in 2017, which was not a landslide year for the party. The length of tenure and size of majorities mean that practical analyses consider Ealing Southall a safe seat. The 2015 result made the seat the 25th safest of Labour's 232 seats by percentage of majority. The larger predecessor seat, created in 1945, was held by Labour throughout its existence.

== Boundaries ==
=== Historic ===
1983–1997: The London Borough of Ealing wards of Dormers Wells, Elthorne, Glebe, Mount Pleasant, Northcote, Northfield, Walpole, and Waxlow.

1997–2010: The London Borough of Ealing wards of Dormers Wells, Ealing Common, Elthorne, Glebe, Mount Pleasant, Northcote, Northfield, Walpole, and Waxlow.

2010–2024: The London Borough of Ealing wards of Dormers Wells, Elthorne, Lady Margaret, Northfield, Norwood Green, Southall Broadway, and Southall Green.

For the 2010 general election, the Boundary Commission for England made minor changes. Part of Greenford Broadway ward and tiny parts of Hobbayne ward and Dormers Wells ward were transferred from the constituency of Ealing North to Ealing Southall. Tiny parts of Hobbayne ward and Dormers Wells ward were also transferred to Ealing North. Walpole ward, and parts of Ealing Broadway ward and Ealing Common ward were transferred from the seat into new Ealing Central and Acton.

=== Current ===
Further to the 2023 review of Westminster constituencies, which came into effect for the 2024 general election, the constituency is composed of:

- The London Borough of Ealing wards of Dormers Wells, Hanwell Broadway, Lady Margaret, Northfield, Norwood Green, Southall Broadway, Southall Green, Southall West and Walpole.

The new boundaries reflect the local authority boundary review which came into effect in May 2022. To bring the electorate within the permitted range, Walpole ward was transferred in from Ealing Central and Acton.

The constituency takes in the south western third of the London Borough of Ealing in west London and is traversed by the Great Western Main Line (railway). The other Ealing constituencies are Ealing North, and Ealing Central and Acton.

== Members of Parliament ==
| Election | Member | Party |
|---|---|---|
| 1983 | Syd Bidwell | Labour |
| 1992 | Piara Khabra | Labour |
| 2007 by-election | Virendra Sharma | Labour |
| 2024 | Deirdre Costigan | Labour |

== Elections ==
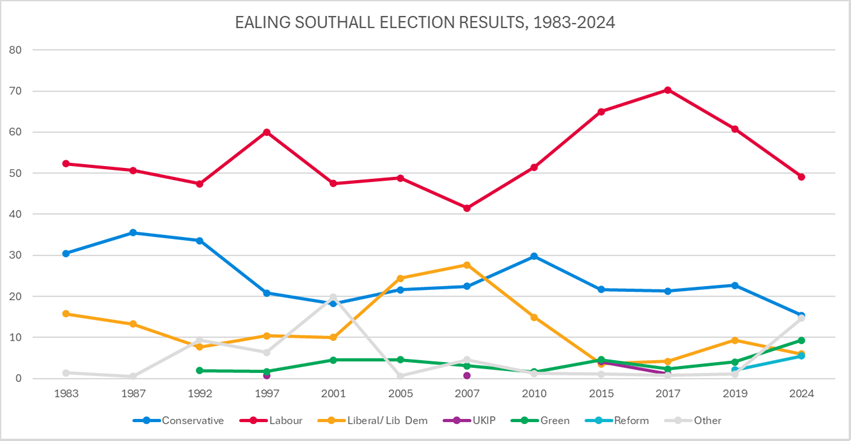
Election results 1983-2024

=== Elections in the 2020s ===
General election 2024: Ealing Southall
| Party | Candidate | Votes | % | ±% |
|---|---|---|---|---|
| Labour | Deirdre Costigan | 23,000 | 49.1 | –10.6 |
| Conservative | Georgie Callé | 7,207 | 15.4 | –8.5 |
| Green | Neil Reynolds | 4,356 | 9.3 | +5.5 |
| Workers Party | Darshan Azad | 4,237 | 9.1 | N/A |
| Liberal Democrats | Tariq Mahmood | 2,832 | 6.0 | –3.8 |
| Reform | Steve Chilcott | 2,585 | 5.5 | +3.6 |
| Independent | Niko Omilana | 740 | 1.6 | N/A |
| Independent | Sangeet Bhail | 557 | 1.2 | N/A |
| Rejoin EU | Peter Ward | 475 | 1.0 | N/A |
| Independent | Joe Bhangu | 319 | 0.7 | N/A |
| Independent | Jaginder Singh | 295 | 0.6 | N/A |
| Independent | Pedro Da Conceicao | 213 | 0.5 | N/A |
| Majority | | 15,793 | 33.7 | −2.1 |
| Turnout | | 46,816 | 59.5 | −8.4 |
| Registered electors | | 78,669 | | |
| Labour hold | | Swing | ▼1.1 | |

=== Elections in the 2010s ===
2019 notional result
| Party | Vote | % |
|---|---|---|
| Labour | 30,469 | 59.7 |
| Conservative | 12,203 | 23.9 |
| Liberal Democrats | 4,995 | 9.8 |
| Green | 1,928 | 3.8 |
| Brexit Party | 946 | 1.9 |
| Others | 457 | 0.9 |
| Turnout | 50,998 | 67.9 |
| Electorate | 75,085 | |

General election 2019: Ealing Southall
| Party | Candidate | Votes | % | ±% |
|---|---|---|---|---|
| Labour | Virendra Sharma | 25,678 | 60.8 | −9.5 |
| Conservative | Tom Bennett | 9,594 | 22.7 | +1.4 |
| Liberal Democrats | Tariq Mahmood | 3,933 | 9.3 | +5.1 |
| Green | Darren Moore | 1,688 | 4.0 | +1.7 |
| Brexit Party | Rosamund Beattie | 867 | 2.1 | N/A |
| CPA | Suzanne Fernandes | 287 | 0.7 | N/A |
| Workers Revolutionary | Hassan Zulkifal | 170 | 0.4 | −0.4 |
| Majority | | 16,084 | 38.1 | −10.9 |
| Turnout | | 42,217 | 65.4 | −3.9 |
| Registered electors | | 64,580 | | |
| Labour hold | | Swing | -5.4 | |

General election 2017: Ealing Southall
| Party | Candidate | Votes | % | ±% |
|---|---|---|---|---|
| Labour | Virendra Sharma | 31,720 | 70.3 | +5.3 |
| Conservative | Fabio Conti | 9,630 | 21.3 | −0.4 |
| Liberal Democrats | Nigel Bakhai | 1,892 | 4.2 | +0.6 |
| Green | Peter Ward | 1,037 | 2.3 | −2.3 |
| UKIP | John Poynton | 504 | 1.1 | −3.0 |
| Workers Revolutionary | Arjinder Thiara | 362 | 0.8 | N/A |
| Majority | | 22,090 | 49.0 | +5.7 |
| Turnout | | 45,145 | 69.3 | +3.2 |
| Registered electors | | 65,188 | | |
| Labour hold | | Swing | +2.8 | |

General election 2015: Ealing Southall
| Party | Candidate | Votes | % | ±% |
|---|---|---|---|---|
| Labour | Virendra Sharma | 28,147 | 65.0 | +13.5 |
| Conservative | James Symes | 9,387 | 21.7 | −8.1 |
| Green | Jas Mahal | 2,007 | 4.6 | +3.0 |
| UKIP | John Poynton | 1,769 | 4.1 | N/A |
| Liberal Democrats | Kavya Kaushik | 1,550 | 3.6 | −11.3 |
| National Liberal | Jagdeesh Singh | 461 | 1.1 | N/A |
| Majority | | 18,760 | 43.3 | +21.6 |
| Turnout | | 43,321 | 66.1 | −4.7 |
| Registered electors | | 65,606 | | |
| Labour hold | | Swing | +10.8 | |

General election 2010: Ealing Southall
| Party | Candidate | Votes | % | ±% |
|---|---|---|---|---|
| Labour | Virendra Sharma | 22,024 | 51.5 | −5.8 |
| Conservative | Gurcharan Singh | 12,733 | 29.8 | +10.8 |
| Liberal Democrats | Nigel Bakhai | 6,383 | 14.9 | −3.3 |
| Green | Suneil Basu | 705 | 1.6 | −3.1 |
| Christian | Mehboob Anil | 503 | 1.2 | N/A |
| Majority | | 9,291 | 21.7 | −2.6 |
| Turnout | | 42,348 | 63.2 | +7.6 |
| Registered electors | | 66,970 | | |
| Labour hold | | Swing | −8.3 | |

=== Elections in the 2000s ===
2007 Ealing Southall by-election
| Party | Candidate | Votes | % | ±% |
|---|---|---|---|---|
| Labour | Virendra Sharma | 15,188 | 41.5 | −7.3 |
| Liberal Democrats | Nigel Bakhai | 10,118 | 27.7 | +3.3 |
| Conservative | Tony Lit | 8,230 | 22.5 | +0.9 |
| Green | Sarah Edwards | 1,135 | 3.1 | −1.5 |
| Respect | Salvinder Dhillon | 588 | 1.6 | N/A |
| UKIP | K. T. Rajan | 285 | 0.8 | N/A |
| Christian Vote | Yaqub Masih | 280 | 0.8 | N/A |
| Independent | Jasdev Rai | 275 | 0.8 | N/A |
| Monster Raving Loony | John Cartwright | 188 | 0.5 | N/A |
| English Democrat | Sati Chaggar | 152 | 0.4 | N/A |
| Independent | Gulbash Singh | 92 | 0.3 | N/A |
| Independent | Kuldeep Grewal | 87 | 0.2 | N/A |
| Majority | | 5,070 | 13.8 | −10.5 |
| Turnout | | 36,618 | 42.9 | −13.3 |
| Registered electors | | 85,262 | | |
| Labour hold | | Swing | −5.4 | |

General election 2005: Ealing Southall
| Party | Candidate | Votes | % | ±% |
|---|---|---|---|---|
| Labour | Piara Khabra | 22,937 | 48.8 | +1.3 |
| Liberal Democrats | Nigel Bakhai | 11,497 | 24.4 | +14.4 |
| Conservative | Mark D.Y. Nicholson | 10,147 | 21.6 | +3.3 |
| Green | Sarah J. Edwards | 2,175 | 4.6 | +0.1 |
| Workers Revolutionary | Malkiat Bilku | 289 | 0.6 | N/A |
| Majority | | 11,440 | 24.4 | −4.8 |
| Turnout | | 47,045 | 56.2 | −0.6 |
| Registered electors | | 83,246 | | |
| Labour hold | | Swing | −6.6 | |

General election 2001: Ealing Southall
| Party | Candidate | Votes | % | ±% |
|---|---|---|---|---|
| Labour | Piara Khabra | 22,239 | 47.5 | −12.5 |
| Conservative | Daniel Kawczynski | 8,556 | 18.3 | −2.5 |
| Independent | Avtar Lit | 5,764 | 12.3 | N/A |
| Liberal Democrats | Baldev Sharma | 4,680 | 10.0 | −0.4 |
| Green | Margaret Cook | 2,119 | 4.5 | +2.8 |
| Independent | Salvinder Singh Dhillon | 1,214 | 2.6 | N/A |
| Independent | Mushtaq Choudhry | 1,166 | 2.5 | N/A |
| Socialist Labour | Harpal Brar | 921 | 2.0 | −1.9 |
| Independent | Mohammed Bhutta | 169 | 0.4 | N/A |
| Majority | | 13,683 | 29.2 | −10.0 |
| Turnout | | 46,828 | 56.9 | −10.9 |
| Registered electors | | 82,373 | | |
| Labour hold | | Swing | -5.0 | |

At the 2001 Election, the Electoral Commissions book "Election 2001" ISBN 978-1-84275-020-9 records the following three candidates with party names rejected for not being recorded on the register of political parties:

- Dhillon – Independent Community Candidate Empowering Change
- Bhutta – Qari
- Lit – Chairman of Sunrise Radio

=== Elections in the 1990s ===
General election 1997: Ealing Southall
| Party | Candidate | Votes | % | ±% |
|---|---|---|---|---|
| Labour | Piara Khabra | 32,791 | 60.0 | +12.6 |
| Conservative | John Penrose | 11,368 | 20.8 | −12.8 |
| Liberal Democrats | Nikki F. Thomson | 5,687 | 10.4 | +2.7 |
| Socialist Labour | Harpal Brar | 2,107 | 3.9 | N/A |
| Green | Nicholas Goodwin | 934 | 1.7 | −0.2 |
| Referendum | Bruce Cherry | 854 | 1.6 | N/A |
| ProLife Alliance | Kinga M. Klepacka | 473 | 0.9 | N/A |
| UKIP | Richard G.C. Mead | 428 | 0.8 | N/A |
| Majority | | 21,423 | 39.2 | +25.4 |
| Turnout | | 54,642 | 66.9 | −8.6 |
| Registered electors | | 81,704 | | |
| Labour hold | | Swing | +12.7 | |

General election 1992: Ealing Southall
| Party | Candidate | Votes | % | ±% |
|---|---|---|---|---|
| Labour | Piara Khabra | 23,476 | 47.4 | −3.3 |
| Conservative | Philip C. Treleaven | 16,610 | 33.6 | −1.9 |
| True Labour | Syd Bidwell | 4,665 | 9.4 | N/A |
| Liberal Democrats | Pash Nandhra | 3,790 | 7.7 | −5.6 |
| Green | Nicholas Goodwin | 964 | 1.9 | N/A |
| Majority | | 6,866 | 13.8 | −1.4 |
| Turnout | | 49,505 | 75.5 | +5.8 |
| Registered electors | | 65,574 | | |
| Labour hold | | Swing | -0.7 | |

=== Elections in the 1980s ===
General election 1987: Ealing Southall
| Party | Candidate | Votes | % | ±% |
|---|---|---|---|---|
| Labour | Syd Bidwell | 26,480 | 50.7 | −1.6 |
| Conservative | Michael Truman | 18,503 | 35.5 | +5.0 |
| Liberal | Monica Howes | 6,947 | 13.3 | −2.5 |
| Workers Revolutionary | Richard Lugg | 256 | 0.5 | N/A |
| Majority | | 7,977 | 15.2 | −6.6 |
| Turnout | | 52,186 | 69.7 | −1.7 |
| Registered electors | | 74,843 | | |
| Labour hold | | Swing | -3.3 | |

General election 1983: Ealing Southall
| Party | Candidate | Votes | % | ±% |
|---|---|---|---|---|
| Labour | Syd Bidwell | 26,664 | 52.3 | −2.1 |
| Conservative | Nigel G.T. Linacre | 15,548 | 30.5 | −2.4 |
| Liberal | Mahmud Nadeen | 8,059 | 15.8 | +8.3 |
| National Front | E. Pendrous | 555 | 1.1 | N/A |
| Independent | S.S. Paul | 150 | 0.3 | N/A |
| Majority | | 11,116 | 21.8 | +0.3 |
| Turnout | | 50,976 | 71.4 | |
| Registered electors | | 71,441 | | |
| Labour win (new seat) | | | | |

== See also ==
- List of parliamentary constituencies in London
- 2007 Ealing Southall by-election
