= Mandali caste =

Community in India

The Mandli are a Rajput community inhabiting the state of Gujarat in India.
