= Virendra Sharma =

British-Indian politician (born 1947)

- वीरेंद्र शर्मा ਵਰਿੰਦਰ ਸ਼ਰਮਾ
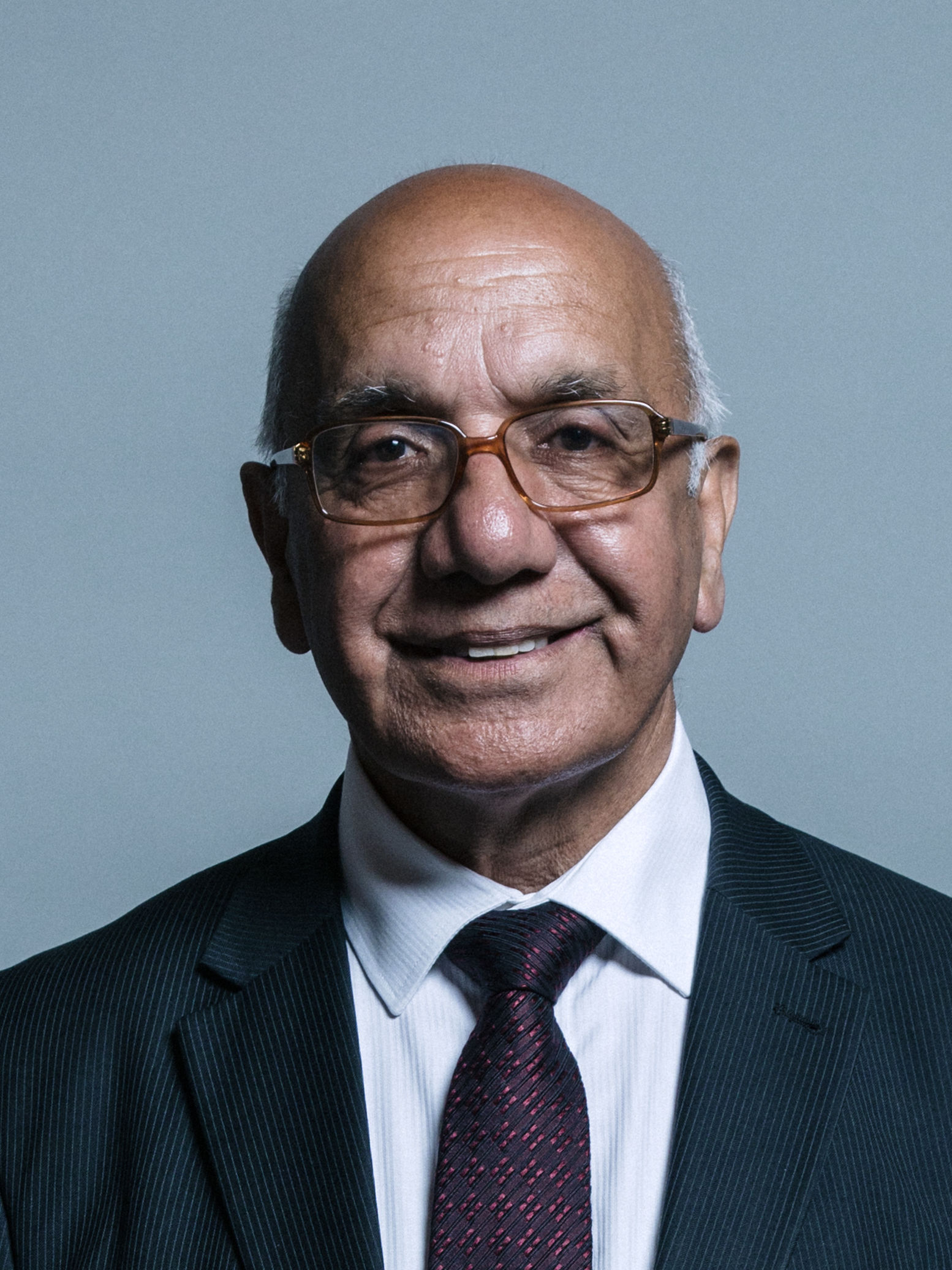

Member of Parliament for Ealing Southall
- In office 19 July 2007 – 30 May 2024
- Preceded by: Piara Khabra
- Succeeded by: Deirdre Costigan

Personal details
- Born: Virendra Kumar Sharma; 5 April 1947 (age 79) Mandhali, Punjab, British India
- Party: Labour
- Spouse: Nirmala Sharma (m. 1968)
- Children: 2
- Education: London School of Economics
- Occupation: Politician
- Website: www.virendrasharma.com

Virendra Kumar Sharma (Hindi: वीरेंद्र कुमार शर्मा, Punjabi: ਵਰਿੰਦਰ ਕੁਮਾਰ ਸ਼ਰਮਾ; born 5 April 1947) is a British-Indian Labour Party politician. He served as the Member of Parliament (MP) for Ealing Southall from 2007 to 2024.

== Early life and career ==
Virendra Sharma was born on 5 April 1947 in Mandhali, Nawanshahr in the Punjab Province of British India into a Punjabi Hindu Brahmin family. He went to university at the London School of Economics on a trade union scholarship.

Sharma came to Hanwell, Ealing, London from India in 1968 and became a bus conductor on the 207 route, later working as a day services manager for people with learning disabilities in Hillingdon. He began his political career by joining the Liberal Party, then switched to Labour. Sharma was Race Equalities Officer to the Labour Party nationally.

He was a councillor in the London Borough of Ealing from 1982 to 2010 and became Mayor.

== Parliamentary career ==
Sharma was elected to Parliament as MP for Ealing Southall at the 2007 Ealing Southall by-election with 41.5% of the vote and a majority of 5,070.

In September 2008, Sharma signed a letter drafted by Keith Vaz on behalf of the disgraced lawyer Shahrokh Mireskandari, for which Vaz was criticised for not declaring his relationship with him. Sharma said that Vaz had not informed him of the relationship and that he would "be more questioning before I sign a letter in future".

In November 2008, Sharma was appointed as Parliamentary private secretary (PPS) to the Minister of State at the Treasury and Home Office, Phil Woolas. Sharma resigned from this post in January 2009 in opposition to the Labour government's proposal to build a third runway at Heathrow Airport.

At the 2010 general election, Sharma was re-elected as MP for Ealing Southall with an increased vote share of 51.5% and an increased majority of 9,291. He supported David Miliband in the 2010 Labour leadership election.

Sharma was again re-elected at the 2015 general election with an increased vote share of 65% and an increased majority of 18,760.

In 2016, in a reversal of his previous stance, Sharma announced that he now supported Heathrow expansion.

At the snap 2017 general election, Sharma was again re-elected with an increased vote share of 70.3% and an increased majority of 22,090.

In July 2017, Sharma voted against the bill on triggering Article 50 in the House of Commons, expressing his concern over Brexit's potential effects on the economy.

In March 2019, Sharma lost a vote of no-confidence at his Constituency Labour Party: the reasons given by opponents were his low attendance at party meetings, slow response to constituents communications and unwillingness to campaign against toxic emissions from the redevelopment of the Old Gasworks site (Southall Waterside). Despite this, he was again re-elected at the 2019 general election, with a decreased vote share of 60.8% and a decreased majority of 16,084.

Sharma is a member of Labour Friends of Israel. He is also vice-chair of the All-Party Parliamentary Group for British-Hindus.

On 27 May 2024, Sharma announced his retirement at the 2024 general election.

== Personal life ==
Sharma is a British-Indian, a British-Punjabi and a British-Hindu. He has been married to Nirmala Sharma since 1968. They have a son and daughter and three grandchildren.

He has been the vice-chair of APPG for British-Hindus. In addition to English, Sharma is fluent in his native Indian languages of Hindi and Punjabi.

In 2023, to celebrate 75 years of India's independence, the British Council's India/UK Together's Season of Culture organised the India UK Achievers Honours in partnership with the National Indian Students and Alumni Union UK (NISAU) to recognise the work of 75 young achievers, 8 outstanding achievers, 3 living legends and one lifetime achiever, who have been educated in the UK. Sharma was given the living legend at the India UK Achievers Honours.

In 2024, Sharma was presented with the Lifetime Achievement Award at the Asian Achievers Awards, honouring his long-standing dedication to public service and community leadership.

Parliament of the United Kingdom
Preceded by Piara Khabra	Member of Parliament for Ealing Southall; 2007–2024	Succeeded by Deirdre Costigan
