= 1987 United Kingdom local elections =

- 7 May 1987

All 36 metropolitan boroughs, all 296 English districts and all 37 Welsh districts

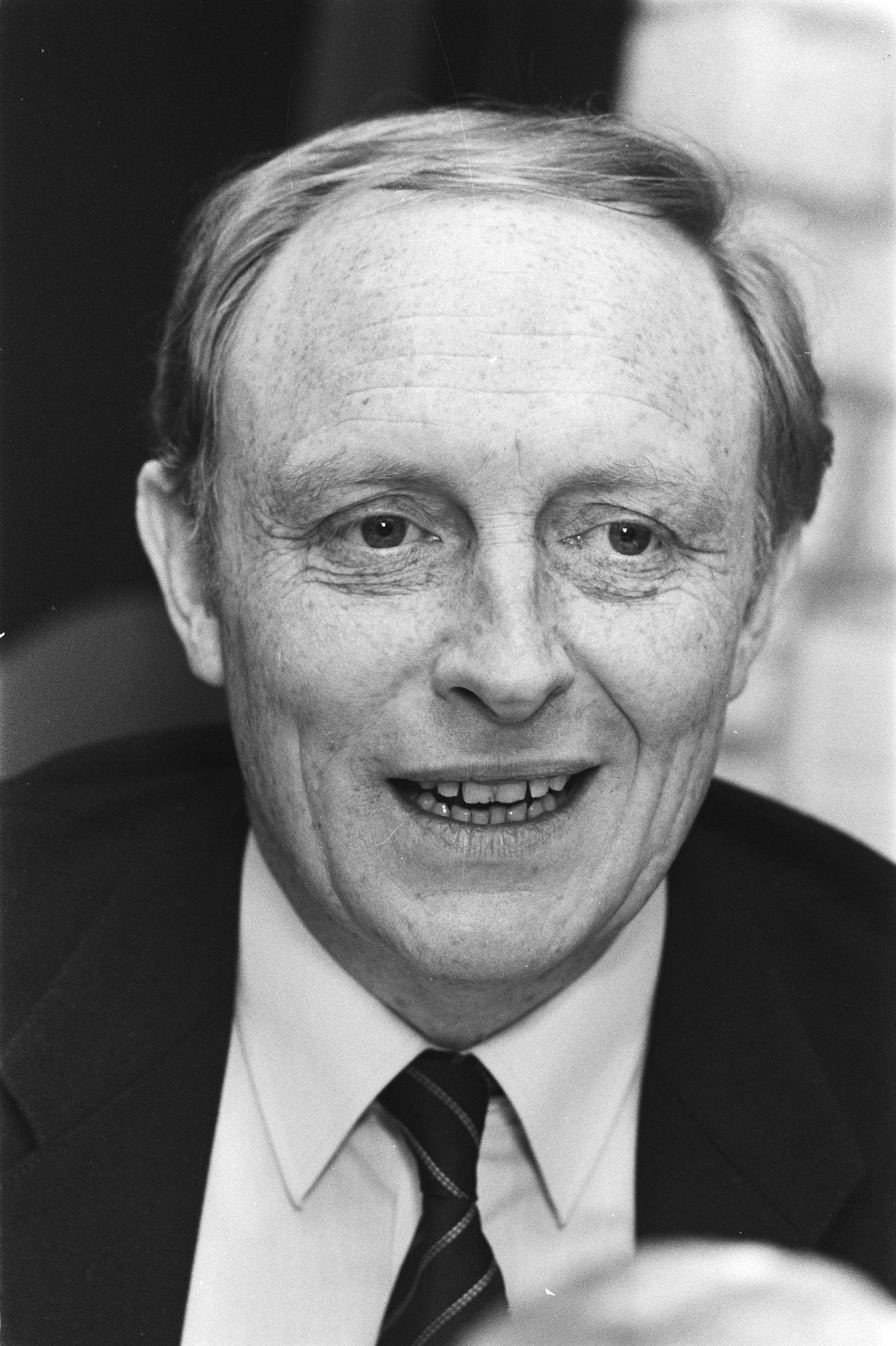

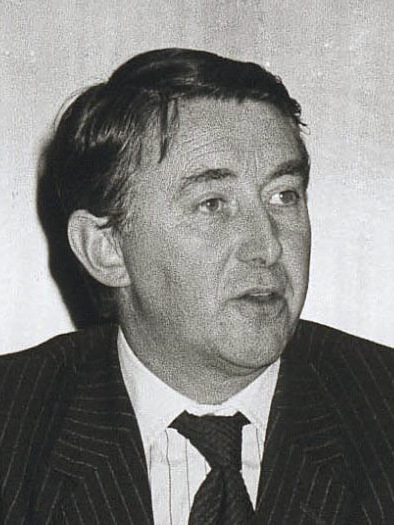

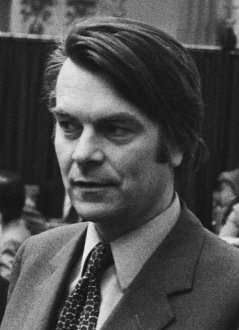
	Majority party	Minority party	Third party
Leader	Margaret Thatcher	Neil Kinnock	David Steel (Lib.); David Owen (SDP)
Party	Conservative	Labour	Alliance
Leader since	11 February 1975	2 October 1983	7 July 1976 / 21 June 1983
Percentage	38%	32%	27%
Councillors +/-	▼75	▼234	▲669

The 1987 United Kingdom local elections were held on Thursday 7 May 1987. It was the first time since 1983 that the Conservatives had enjoyed the largest share of the vote in local council elections.

Soon after the elections, Prime Minister Margaret Thatcher called a general election which resulted in a second successive Conservative landslide, although Labour managed to cut the government's overall majority, while the Alliance endured another disappointing performance and was soon disbanded as the SDP and Liberals agreed on a merger the following year.

The number of councillors was somewhat reduced from the previous year. The Conservatives lost 75 seats, Labour lost 234 and the Liberal-SDP Alliance gained 669.

== England ==
=== Metropolitan boroughs ===
All 36 metropolitan borough councils had one third of their seats up for election.

Council	Previous control	Result	Details
Barnsley	Labour	Labour hold	Details
Birmingham	Labour	Labour hold	Details
Bolton	Labour	Labour hold	Details
Bradford	Labour	Labour hold	Details
Bury	Labour	Labour hold	Details
Calderdale	No overall control	No overall control hold	Details
Coventry	Labour	Labour hold	Details
Doncaster	Labour	Labour hold	Details
Dudley	Labour	Labour hold	Details
Gateshead	Labour	Labour hold	Details
Kirklees	No overall control	No overall control hold	Details
Knowsley	Labour	Labour hold	Details
Leeds	Labour	Labour hold	Details
Liverpool	Labour	Labour hold	Details
Manchester	Labour	Labour hold	Details
Newcastle upon Tyne	Labour	Labour hold	Details
North Tyneside	No overall control	Labour gain	Details
Oldham	Labour	Labour hold	Details
Rochdale	Labour	Labour hold	Details
Rotherham	Labour	Labour hold	Details
Salford	Labour	Labour hold	Details
Sandwell	Labour	Labour hold	Details
Sefton	No overall control	No overall control hold	Details
Sheffield	Labour	Labour hold	Details
Solihull	Conservative	Conservative hold	Details
South Tyneside	Labour	Labour hold	Details
St Helens	Labour	Labour hold	Details
Stockport	No overall control	No overall control hold	Details
Sunderland	Labour	Labour hold	Details
Tameside	Labour	Labour hold	Details
Trafford	No overall control	No overall control hold	Details
Wakefield	Labour	Labour hold	Details
Walsall	No overall control	No overall control hold	Details
Wigan	Labour	Labour hold	Details
Wirral	No overall control	No overall control hold	Details
Wolverhampton	Labour	No overall control gain	Details

=== District councils ===
==== Whole council ====
In 180 districts the whole council was up for election.

Six of those districts - East Devon, Hinckley and Bosworth, Leicester, Mid Sussex, West Dorset and Woodspring - returned to whole councils elections having previously been elected by thirds.

In 5 districts there were new ward boundaries, following further electoral boundary reviews by the Local Government Boundary Commission for England.

Council	Previous control	Result	Details
Allerdale	No overall control	No overall control hold	Details
Alnwick	No overall control	No overall control hold	Details
Arun	Conservative	Conservative hold	Details
Ashfield	Labour	Labour hold	Details
Ashford	Conservative	Conservative hold	Details
Aylesbury Vale	Conservative	Conservative hold	Details
Babergh	No overall control	No overall control hold	Details
Berwick-upon-Tweed	No overall control	No overall control hold	Details
Beverley	Conservative	Conservative hold	Details
Blaby	Conservative	Conservative hold	Details
Blackpool	Conservative	No overall control gain	Details
Blyth Valley	Labour	Alliance gain	Details
Bolsover	Labour	Labour hold	Details
Boothferry	Conservative	No overall control gain	Details
Boston	No overall control	No overall control hold	Details
Bournemouth	Conservative	Conservative hold	Details
Bracknell Forest	Conservative	Conservative hold	Details
Braintree	No overall control	No overall control hold	Details
Breckland	Conservative	Conservative hold	Details
Bridgnorth	Independent	Independent hold	Details
Bromsgrove	Conservative	Conservative hold	Details
Broxtowe	Conservative	Conservative hold	Details
Canterbury	Conservative	Conservative hold	Details
Caradon	Independent	Independent hold	Details
Carrick	No overall control	No overall control hold	Details
Castle Morpeth	No overall control	No overall control hold	Details
Castle Point	Conservative	Conservative hold	Details
Charnwood	Conservative	Conservative hold	Details
Chelmsford ‡	Alliance	Alliance hold	Details
Chesterfield	Labour	Labour hold	Details
Chester-le-Street	Labour	Labour hold	Details
Chichester	Conservative	Conservative hold	Details
Chiltern	Conservative	Conservative hold	Details
Christchurch	Conservative	Conservative hold	Details
Cleethorpes	No overall control	No overall control hold	Details
Copeland	Labour	Labour hold	Details
Corby	Labour	Labour hold	Details
Cotswold	Independent	Independent hold	Details
Dacorum	Conservative	Conservative hold	Details
Darlington	Labour	No overall control gain	Details
Dartford	Conservative	Conservative hold	Details
Derwentside	Labour	Labour hold	Details
Dover	Conservative	Conservative hold	Details
Durham	Labour	Labour hold	Details
Easington	Labour	Labour hold	Details
East Cambridgeshire	Independent	Independent hold	Details
East Devon	Conservative	Conservative hold	Details
East Hampshire	Conservative	Conservative hold	Details
East Hertfordshire	Conservative	Conservative hold	Details
East Lindsey	Independent	Independent hold	Details
East Northamptonshire	Conservative	Conservative hold	Details
East Staffordshire	No overall control	No overall control hold	Details
East Yorkshire	Conservative	Conservative hold	Details
Eden	Independent	Independent hold	Details
Epsom and Ewell	Independent	Independent hold	Details
Erewash	Conservative	Conservative hold	Details
Fenland	Conservative	Conservative hold	Details
Forest Heath	No overall control	Conservative gain	Details
Forest of Dean	No overall control	No overall control hold	Details
Fylde	Conservative	Conservative hold	Details
Gedling	Conservative	Conservative hold	Details
Glanford	Conservative	Conservative hold	Details
Gravesham	Conservative	No overall control gain	Details
Guildford	Conservative	Conservative hold	Details
Hambleton	Independent	No overall control gain	Details
Harborough	Conservative	No overall control gain	Details
High Peak	No overall control	No overall control hold	Details
Hinckley and Bosworth	Conservative	Conservative hold	Details
Holderness	Independent	Independent hold	Details
Horsham	Conservative	Conservative hold	Details
Hove	Conservative	Conservative hold	Details
Kennet	Independent	No overall control gain	Details
Kerrier	No overall control	No overall control hold	Details
Kettering	Conservative	No overall control gain	Details
King's Lynn and West Norfolk	Conservative	Conservative hold	Details
Kingswood ‡	Conservative	Conservative hold	Details
Lancaster	Conservative	No overall control gain	Details
Langbaurgh	Labour	No overall control gain	Details
Leicester	Labour	Labour hold	Details
Lewes	Conservative	Conservative hold	Details
Lichfield	Conservative	Conservative hold	Details
Luton	Conservative	Conservative hold	Details
Maldon	No overall control	No overall control hold	Details
Malvern Hills	Independent	No overall control gain	Details
Mansfield	Labour	Labour hold	Details
Medina	Alliance	Conservative gain	Details
Melton	Conservative	Conservative hold	Details
Mendip	Conservative	No overall control gain	Details
Mid Bedfordshire	Conservative	Conservative hold	Details
Mid Devon	Independent	Independent hold	Details
Mid Suffolk	No overall control	No overall control hold	Details
Mid Sussex	Conservative	Conservative hold	Details
Middlesbrough	Labour	Labour hold	Details
New Forest	Conservative	Conservative hold	Details
Newark and Sherwood	No overall control	No overall control hold	Details
Newbury	Conservative	Conservative hold	Details
North Cornwall	Independent	Independent hold	Details
North Devon	Independent	No overall control gain	Details
North Dorset	Independent	Independent hold	Details
North East Derbyshire	Labour	Labour hold	Details
North Kesteven	Independent	No overall control gain	Details
North Norfolk	Independent	Independent hold	Details
North Shropshire	Independent	Independent hold	Details
North Warwickshire	Labour	Labour hold	Details
North West Leicestershire	No overall control	No overall control hold	Details
North Wiltshire	Conservative	Conservative hold	Details
Northampton	No overall control	Conservative gain	Details
Northavon	Conservative	Conservative hold	Details
Nottingham	Labour	Conservative gain	Details
Oswestry	Independent	No overall control gain	Details
Plymouth	Conservative	Conservative hold	Details
Poole	Conservative	Conservative hold	Details
Restormel	Independent	No overall control gain	Details
Ribble Valley	Conservative	Conservative hold	Details
Richmondshire	Independent	Independent hold	Details
Rochester-upon-Medway	Conservative	Conservative hold	Details
Rother	Conservative	Conservative hold	Details
Rushcliffe	Conservative	Conservative hold	Details
Rutland	Independent	No overall control gain	Details
Ryedale	Independent	No overall control gain	Details
Salisbury	No overall control	Conservative gain	Details
Scarborough	No overall control	No overall control hold	Details
Sedgefield	Labour	Labour hold	Details
Sedgemoor	Conservative	Conservative hold	Details
Selby	Conservative	Conservative hold	Details
Sevenoaks	Conservative	Conservative hold	Details
Shepway	Conservative	No overall control gain	Details
South Bucks	Conservative	Conservative hold	Details
South Derbyshire	Labour	Labour hold	Details
South Hams	No overall control	Conservative gain	Details
South Holland	Independent	No overall control gain	Details
South Kesteven	Conservative	Conservative hold	Details
South Norfolk	Conservative	No overall control gain	Details
South Northamptonshire	Conservative	Conservative hold	Details
South Oxfordshire	Conservative	Conservative hold	Details
South Ribble ‡	Conservative	Conservative hold	Details
South Shropshire	Independent	Independent hold	Details
South Somerset	No overall control	Alliance gain	Details
South Staffordshire	Conservative	Conservative hold	Details
South Wight	Conservative	No overall control gain	Details
Spelthorne	Conservative	Conservative hold	Details
St Edmundsbury	Conservative	Conservative hold	Details
Stafford	No overall control	No overall control hold	Details
Staffordshire Moorlands	No overall control	No overall control hold	Details
Stockton-on-Tees	Labour	Labour hold	Details
Suffolk Coastal	Conservative	Conservative hold	Details
Surrey Heath	Conservative	Conservative hold	Details
Tamworth ‡	Labour	Conservative gain	Details
Taunton Deane ‡	Conservative	Conservative hold	Details
Teesdale	Independent	Independent hold	Details
Teignbridge	No overall control	No overall control hold	Details
Tendring	Conservative	Conservative hold	Details
Test Valley	Conservative	Conservative hold	Details
Tewkesbury	Independent	No overall control gain	Details
Thanet	Independent	No overall control gain	Details
The Wrekin	Labour	Labour hold	Details
Torridge	Independent	Independent hold	Details
Tynedale	No overall control	No overall control hold	Details
Uttlesford	Conservative	Conservative hold	Details
Vale of White Horse	Conservative	Conservative hold	Details
Vale Royal	No overall control	No overall control hold	Details
Wansbeck	Labour	Labour hold	Details
Wansdyke	Conservative	Conservative hold	Details
Warrington	Labour	Labour hold	Details
Warwick	Conservative	Conservative hold	Details
Waverley	Conservative	Conservative hold	Details
Wealden	Conservative	Conservative hold	Details
Wear Valley	Labour	Labour hold	Details
Wellingborough	Conservative	Conservative hold	Details
West Derbyshire	Conservative	Conservative hold	Details
West Devon	Independent	No overall control gain	Details
West Dorset	Independent	No overall control gain	Details
West Somerset	Independent	Independent hold	Details
West Wiltshire	Conservative	Conservative hold	Details
Wimborne	Conservative	Conservative hold	Details
Windsor and Maidenhead	Conservative	Conservative hold	Details
Woodspring	Conservative	Conservative hold	Details
Wychavon	No overall control	Conservative gain	Details
Wycombe	Conservative	Conservative hold	Details
Wyre	Conservative	Conservative hold	Details

‡ New ward boundaries

==== Third of council ====
In 116 districts one third of the council was up for election.

Council	Previous control	Result	Details
Adur	Alliance	Alliance hold	Details
Amber Valley	Labour	No overall control gain	Details
Barrow-in-Furness	Labour	Labour hold	Details
Basildon	Labour	No overall control gain	Details
Basingstoke and Deane	Conservative	Conservative hold	Details
Bassetlaw	Labour	Labour hold	Details
Bath	Conservative	No overall control gain	Details
Blackburn	Labour	No overall control gain	Details
Brentwood	Conservative	Conservative hold	Details
Brighton	No overall control	No overall control hold	Details
Bristol	Labour	Labour hold	Details
Broadland	Conservative	Conservative hold	Details
Broxbourne	Conservative	Conservative hold	Details
Burnley	Labour	Labour hold	Details
Cambridge	Labour	No overall control gain	Details
Cannock Chase	No overall control	Labour gain	Details
Carlisle	Labour	Labour hold	Details
Cheltenham	No overall control	No overall control hold	Details
Cherwell	Conservative	Conservative hold	Details
Chester	No overall control	No overall control hold	Details
Chorley	No overall control	No overall control hold	Details
Colchester	No overall control	No overall control hold	Details
Congleton	No overall control	No overall control hold	Details
Craven	No overall control	No overall control hold	Details
Crawley	Labour	Labour hold	Details
Crewe and Nantwich	No overall control	No overall control hold	Details
Daventry	Conservative	Conservative hold	Details
Derby	Labour	Labour hold	Details
Eastbourne	Alliance	Alliance hold	Details
Eastleigh	No overall control	No overall control hold	Details
Ellesmere Port and Neston	Labour	Labour hold	Details
Elmbridge	No overall control	No overall control hold	Details
Epping Forest	Conservative	Conservative hold	Details
Exeter	No overall control	No overall control hold	Details
Fareham	No overall control	Conservative gain	Details
Gillingham	Conservative	Conservative hold	Details
Gloucester	No overall control	Conservative gain	Details
Gosport	Conservative	Conservative hold	Details
Great Grimsby	Labour	Labour hold	Details
Great Yarmouth	No overall control	No overall control hold	Details
Halton	Labour	Labour hold	Details
Harlow	Labour	Labour hold	Details
Harrogate	Conservative	Conservative hold	Details
Hart	No overall control	No overall control hold	Details
Hartlepool	Labour	Labour hold	Details
Hastings	No overall control	No overall control hold	Details
Havant	Conservative	Conservative hold	Details
Hereford	Alliance	Alliance hold	Details
Hertsmere	Conservative	Conservative hold	Details
Huntingdonshire	Conservative	Conservative hold	Details
Hyndburn	Labour	Labour hold	Details
Ipswich	Labour	Labour hold	Details
Kingston upon Hull	Labour	Labour hold	Details
Leominster	Independent	Independent hold	Details
Lincoln	Labour	Labour hold	Details
Macclesfield	Conservative	Conservative hold	Details
Maidstone	No overall control	No overall control hold	Details
Milton Keynes	No overall control	No overall control hold	Details
Mole Valley	No overall control	No overall control hold	Details
Newcastle-under-Lyme	Labour	Labour hold	Details
North Bedfordshire	No overall control	No overall control hold	Details
North Hertfordshire	Conservative	Conservative hold	Details
Norwich	Labour	Labour hold	Details
Nuneaton and Bedworth	Labour	Labour hold	Details
Oadby and Wigston	Conservative	Conservative hold	Details
Oxford	Labour	Labour hold	Details
Pendle	No overall control	Alliance gain	Details
Penwith	No overall control	No overall control hold	Details
Peterborough	No overall control	No overall control hold	Details
Portsmouth	Conservative	Conservative hold	Details
Preston	Labour	Labour hold	Details
Purbeck	No overall control	No overall control hold	Details
Reading	No overall control	Labour gain	Details
Redditch	Labour	Labour hold	Details
Reigate and Banstead	Conservative	Conservative hold	Details
Rochford	Conservative	Conservative hold	Details
Rossendale	Labour	Labour hold	Details
Rugby	No overall control	Conservative gain	Details
Runnymede	Conservative	Conservative hold	Details
Rushmoor	Conservative	Conservative hold	Details
Scunthorpe	Labour	Labour hold	Details
Shrewsbury and Atcham	No overall control	No overall control hold	Details
Slough	Labour	Labour hold	Details
South Bedfordshire	Conservative	Conservative hold	Details
South Cambridgeshire	Independent	Independent hold	Details
South Herefordshire	Independent	Independent hold	Details
South Lakeland	No overall control	No overall control hold	Details
Southampton	Labour	No overall control gain	Details
Southend-on-Sea	Conservative	No overall control gain	Details
St Albans	No overall control	No overall control hold	Details
Stevenage	Labour	Labour hold	Details
Stoke-on-Trent	Labour	Labour hold	Details
Stratford-on-Avon	Conservative	Conservative hold	Details
Stroud	No overall control	No overall control hold	Details
Swale	No overall control	No overall control hold	Details
Tandridge	Conservative	Conservative hold	Details
Thamesdown	Labour	Labour hold	Details
Three Rivers	No overall control	Alliance gain	Details
Thurrock	Labour	Labour hold	Details
Tonbridge and Malling	Conservative	Conservative hold	Details
Torbay	Conservative	Conservative hold	Details
Tunbridge Wells	Conservative	Conservative hold	Details
Watford	Labour	Labour hold	Details
Waveney	No overall control	No overall control hold	Details
Welwyn Hatfield	Labour	Labour hold	Details
West Lancashire	No overall control	Conservative gain	Details
West Lindsey	No overall control	Alliance gain	Details
West Oxfordshire	No overall control	Conservative gain	Details
Weymouth and Portland	No overall control	No overall control hold	Details
Winchester	Conservative	No overall control gain	Details
Woking	No overall control	No overall control hold	Details
Wokingham	Conservative	Conservative hold	Details
Worcester	Labour	Labour hold	Details
Worthing	Conservative	Conservative hold	Details
Wyre Forest	No overall control	No overall control hold	Details
York	Labour	Labour hold	Details

== Wales ==
=== District councils ===
Council	Previous control	Result	Details
Aberconwy	No overall control	No overall control hold	Details
Alyn and Deeside	No overall control	Labour gain	Details
Anglesey - Ynys Môn	Independent	Independent hold	Details
Arfon	No overall control	No overall control hold	Details
Blaenau Gwent	Labour	Labour hold	Details
Brecknock	Independent	Independent hold	Details
Cardiff	Conservative	No overall control gain	Details
Carmarthen	Independent	Independent hold	Details
Ceredigion	Independent	Independent hold	Details
Colwyn	No overall control	No overall control hold	Details
Cynon Valley	Labour	Labour hold	Details
Delyn	No overall control	No overall control hold	Details
Dinefwr	Labour	Labour hold	Details
Dwyfor	Independent	Independent hold	Details
Glyndŵr	Independent	Independent hold	Details
Islwyn	Labour	Labour hold	Details
Llanelli	Labour	Labour hold	Details
Lliw Valley	Labour	Labour hold	Details
Meirionnydd	Independent	Independent hold	Details
Merthyr Tydfil	Labour	Labour hold	Details
Monmouth	Conservative	Conservative hold	Details
Montgomeryshire	Independent	Independent hold	Details
Neath	Labour	Labour hold	Details
Newport	Labour	Labour hold	Details
Ogwr	No overall control	Labour gain	Details
Port Talbot	Labour	Labour hold	Details
Preseli Pembrokeshire	Independent	Independent hold	Details
Radnor	Independent	Independent hold	Details
Rhondda	Labour	Labour hold	Details
Rhuddlan	Independent	Independent hold	Details
Rhymney Valley	Labour	Labour hold	Details
South Pembrokeshire	Independent	Independent hold	Details
Swansea	Labour	Labour hold	Details
Taff-Ely	Labour	Labour hold	Details
Torfaen	Labour	Labour hold	Details
Vale of Glamorgan	Conservative	Conservative hold	Details
Wrexham Maelor	No overall control	Labour gain	Details
