= 1987 Wyre Borough Council election =

Election

- 7 May 1987

All 55 seats to Wyre Borough Council 28 seats needed for a majority

	First party	Second party	Third party
Party	Conservative	Labour	Liberal/SDP Alliance
Last election	46	8	2
Seats won	43	8	4
Seat change	▼3	=	▲2
Leader before election
Conservative
Leader after election
Conservative

The 1987 Wyre Borough Council election took place on 7 May 1987. This election was held on the same day as the 1987 United Kingdom local elections.

The Conservative Party held overall control of the council.

== Election result ==
1987 Wyre Borough Council
Party	Candidates	Seats	Gains	Losses	Net gain/loss	Seats %	Votes %	Votes	+/−
Conservative		43	2	5	▼3				
Labour		8	2	2	=				
Liberal/SDP Alliance		4	2	0	▲2				

== Ward Results ==
=== Bailey ===
Bailey (3 seats)
Party	Candidate	Votes	%	±%
Labour	Vink A.	734	38.5	
Labour	Davies B.	616		
Conservative	Mellor I.	611	32.0	
Labour	Alexander D.	604		
Liberal/SDP Alliance	Scrivener D.	562	29.5	
Liberal/SDP Alliance	Brooks C.	491		
Turnout		3,618	45.1	
Labour hold				
Labour hold				
Conservative gain from Labour				

=== Bourne ===
Bourne (3 seats)
Party	Candidate	Votes	%	±%
Conservative	Croft T.	1,204	45.4	
Conservative	McGrandle N. Ms.	1,042		
Conservative	Lawrenson R.	980		
Labour	Stone P.	884	33.3	
Labour	Fisher I.	712		
Labour	Traynor J.	710		
Liberal/SDP Alliance	Clegg M. Ms.	564	21.3	
Turnout		5,096	46.7	
Conservative gain from Labour				
Conservative hold				
Conservative hold				

=== Breck ===
Breck (2 seats)
Party	Candidate	Votes	%	±%
Conservative	Roper G.	793	56.6	
Conservative	Taylor H.	779		
Labour	Fail J.	397	28.3	
Labour	Irish G.	347		
Green	Brown A.	211	15.1	
Turnout		2,527	50.4	
Conservative hold				
Conservative hold				

=== Brock ===
Brock (1 seat)
Party	Candidate	Votes	%	±%
Conservative	Fox A.	510	86.1	
Liberal/SDP Alliance	Hooson H. Ms.	82	13.9	
Turnout		592	46.0	
Conservative hold				

=== Calder ===
Calder (1 seat)
Party	Candidate	Votes	%	±%
Conservative	Ibison T.	401	62.8	
Liberal/SDP Alliance	Sloman S. Ms.	157	24.6	
Labour	Jenkins C.	63	9.9	
Green	Clark P. Ms.	18	2.8	
Turnout		639	54.5	
Conservative hold				

=== Carleton ===
Carleton (2 seats)
Party	Candidate	Votes	%	±%
Conservative	Ward J.	1,131	51.3	
Conservative	Macgregor S.	1,104		
Liberal/SDP Alliance	Storey M. Ms.	654	29.7	
Labour	Pacey E. Ms.	420	19.0	
Labour	Smith P.	343		
Turnout		3,652	52.6	
Conservative hold				
Conservative hold				

=== Catterall ===
Catterall (1 seat)
Party	Candidate	Votes	%	±%
Liberal/SDP Alliance	Sharples D.	724	88.1	
Labour	Thompson K.	98	11.9	
Turnout		822	57.1	
Liberal/SDP Alliance gain from Conservative				

=== Cleveleys Park ===
Cleveleys Park (3 seats)
Party	Candidate	Votes	%	±%
Conservative	Berry C.	912	42.2	
Conservative	Bootle J.	861		
Conservative	Liddle A.	770		
Liberal/SDP Alliance	Cohen I. Ms.	678	31.3	
Labour	Horsley J.	573	26.5	
Turnout		3,794	44.6	
Conservative hold				
Conservative hold				
Conservative hold				

=== Duchy ===
Duchy (1 seat)
Party	Candidate	Votes	%	±%
Liberal/SDP Alliance	Simpson I.	579	60.5	
Conservative	Smith P.	330	34.5	
Labour	Warrilow E. Ms.	48	5.0	
Turnout		957	62.0	
Liberal/SDP Alliance hold				

=== Garstang ===
Garstang (2 seats)
Party	Candidate	Votes	%	±%
Liberal/SDP Alliance	Cornthwaite A.	901	47.0	
Liberal/SDP Alliance	Sharrock R.	883		
Conservative	Moreland F.	848	44.3	
Conservative	Lang R.	740		
Labour	Brooke H. Ms.	166	8.7	
Turnout		3,538	59.6	
Liberal/SDP Alliance hold				
Liberal/SDP Alliance gain from Conservative				

=== Great Eccleston ===
Great Eccleston (1 seat)
Party	Candidate	Votes	%	±%
Conservative	Hunter P.	588	55.3	
Liberal/SDP Alliance	Le Noury C. Ms.	476	44.7	
Turnout		1,064	50.0	
Conservative hold				

=== Hambleton ===
Hambleton (2 seats)
Party	Candidate	Votes	%	±%
Conservative	Williamson R.	1,067	78.6	
Conservative	Pimbley T.	949		
Labour	Barnes J.	290	21.4	
Turnout		2,306	37.6	
Conservative hold				
Conservative hold				

=== Hardhorn ===
Hardhorn (2 seats)
Party	Candidate	Votes	%	±%
Conservative	Stebbing C.	1,042	58.8	
Conservative	Foulkes A.	937		
Ind. Conservative	Bennett K.	509	28.7	
Labour	Hacking I.	221	12.5	
Labour	Norwood G.	184		
Turnout		2,893	55.5	
Conservative hold				
Conservative hold				

=== High Cross ===
High Cross (2 seats)
Party	Candidate	Votes	%	±%
Conservative	Anderson L. Ms.	1,013	76.6	
Conservative	Catlow P. Ms.	992		
Labour	Hogston S. Ms.	309	23.4	
Labour	Marson L.	306		
Turnout		2,620	49.5	
Conservative hold				
Conservative hold				

=== Jubilee ===
Jubilee (2 seats)
Party	Candidate	Votes	%	±%
Conservative	Townend F.	792	42.2	
Residents	Dowden S. Ms.	581	31.0	
Conservative	Marshall E.	550		
Liberal/SDP Alliance	Meller G.	252	13.4	
Labour	Roylance A.	250	13.3	
Liberal/SDP Alliance	Timmins D. Ms.	246		
Turnout		2,671	47.2	
Conservative hold				
Residents gain from Conservative				

=== Mount ===
Mount (2 seats)
Party	Candidate	Votes	%	±%
Labour	Jackson B.	772	51.3	
Labour	Stables-Jackson J.	693		
Conservative	Agnew P.	468	31.1	
Conservative	Dickinson K. Ms.	463		
Liberal/SDP Alliance	Ashton E. Ms.	266	17.7	
Liberal/SDP Alliance	Hooley D.	239		
Turnout		2,901	51.5	
Labour gain from Conservative				
Labour gain from Conservative				

=== Norcross ===
Norcross (2 seats)
Party	Candidate	Votes	%	±%
Conservative	Jordin L. Ms.	919	49.6	
Conservative	Jolley L.	872		
Liberal/SDP Alliance	Blower D.	484	26.1	
Labour	Owen J.	450	24.3	
Turnout		2,725	48.3	
Conservative hold				
Conservative hold				

=== Park ===
Park (3 seats)
Party	Candidate	Votes	%	±%
Labour	Allen R.	806	44.5	
Labour	Leadbetter S.	773		
Labour	Horrocks G.	716		
Conservative	Howard T.	551	30.4	
Liberal/SDP Alliance	Price C.	453	25.0	
Turnout		3,299	43.2	
Labour hold				
Labour hold				
Labour hold				

=== Pharos ===
Pharos (2 seats)
Party	Candidate	Votes	%	±%
Labour	Barlow M. Ms.	722	50.2	
Conservative	Briggs M. Ms.	715	49.8	
Labour	Pilling J.	669		
Conservative	Cartwright M. Ms.	640		
Turnout		2,746	50.5	
Labour hold				
Conservative hold				

=== Pilling ===
Pilling (1 seat)
Party	Candidate	Votes	%	±%
Conservative	Watson R.	Unopposed		
Turnout		0	0.0	
Conservative hold				

=== Preesall ===
Preesall (3 seats)
Party	Candidate	Votes	%	±%
Conservative	Mutch J. Ms.	1,334	71.2	
Conservative	Raby P.	1,199		
Conservative	Brook P.	1,121		
Labour	Wardley M.	540	28.8	
Labour	Higginson K.	532		
Turnout		4,726	46.0	
Conservative hold				
Conservative hold				
Conservative hold				

=== Rossall ===
Rossall (3 seats)
Party	Candidate	Votes	%	±%
Conservative	King H.	1,110	58.3	
Conservative	Oldfield M. Ms.	1,081		
Conservative	Smith E.	1,048		
Liberal/SDP Alliance	Brandes D.	409	21.5	
Liberal/SDP Alliance	Angel A.	387		
Labour	Crane S.	384	20.2	
Labour	Fisher C.	347		
Labour	Stirzaker D.	327		
Turnout		4,093	45.9	
Conservative hold				
Conservative hold				
Conservative hold				

=== Staina ===
Staina (3 seats)
Party	Candidate	Votes	%	±%
Conservative	Forsyth W.	1,325	57.2	
Conservative	Powell M.	1,320		
Conservative	Ashworth C.	1,310		
Liberal/SDP Alliance	Macneill S.	565	24.4	
Labour	Lord S.	428	18.5	
Turnout		4,948	48.3	
Conservative hold				
Conservative hold				
Conservative hold				

=== Tithebarn ===
Tithebarn (2 seats)
Party	Candidate	Votes	%	±%
Conservative	Hawley P.	766	47.5	
Conservative	Baker D.	751		
Liberal/SDP Alliance	Glennon F.	539	33.4	
Labour	Myers H.	308	19.1	
Labour	Pacey P.	302		
Turnout		2,666	52.6	
Conservative hold				
Conservative hold				

=== Victoria ===
Victoria (3 seats)
Party	Candidate	Votes	%	±%
Conservative	Grime J.	1,055	69.2	
Conservative	Preston S. Ms.	1,050		
Conservative	Powell G.	1,015		
Labour	Rimmer E.	469	30.8	
Turnout		3,589	43.8	
Conservative hold				
Conservative hold				
Conservative hold				

=== Warren ===
Warren (3 seats)
Party	Candidate	Votes	%	±%
Conservative	Formstone H.	919	47.6	
Conservative	Marr L.	908		
Conservative	Vincent A.	900		
Labour	Harrison J.	628	32.5	
Labour	Chantler J.	579		
Labour	Walker H.	565		
Liberal/SDP Alliance	Blower W. Ms.	385	19.9	
Turnout		4,284	50.4	
Conservative hold				
Conservative hold				
Conservative hold				

=== Wyresdale ===
Wyresdale (1 seat)
Party	Candidate	Votes	%	±%
Conservative	Hardman J.	534	57.8	
Liberal/SDP Alliance	Graddon J.	341	36.9	
Labour	Gillatt J.	49	5.3	
Turnout		924	66.4	
Conservative hold				
