= 1987 Colchester Borough Council election =

1987 UK local government election

- 5 May 1987

20 out of 60 seats to Colchester Borough Council 31 seats needed for a majority
- Registered: 94,639
- Turnout: 45.7% (▲4.1%)
	First party	Second party	Third party
Party	Conservative	Alliance	Labour
Last election	28 seats, 33.3%	16 seats, 36.0%	12 seats, 26.9%
Seats won	9	9	1
Seats after	24	23	9
Seat change	▼4	▲6	▼2
Popular vote	17,188	15,907	8,834
Percentage	39.7%	36.8%	20.4%
Swing	▲6.4%	▲0.8%	▼6.5%
	Fourth party	Fifth party
Party	Residents	Independent
Last election	3 seats, 2.7%	1 seat, 1.1%
Seats won	1	0
Seats after	3	1
Seat change	Steady	Steady
Popular vote	1,242	79
Percentage	2.9%	0.2%
Swing	▲0.2%	▼0.9%
- Winner of each seat at the 1987 Colchester Borough Council election.

The 1987 Colchester Borough Council election took place on 5 May 1987 to elect members of Colchester Borough Council in Essex, England. This was on the same day as other local elections across the United Kingdom.

== Summary ==
=== Election result ===
1987 Colchester Borough Council election
Party	This election				Full council			This election		
Party	Candidates	Seats	Net	Seats %	Other	Total	Total %	Votes	Votes %	+/−
Conservative	20	9	▼4	45.0	15	24	40.0	17,188	39.7	+6.4
Alliance	19	9	▲6	45.0	14	23	36.7	15,907	36.8	+0.8
Labour	20	1	▼2	5.0	8	9	16.7	8,834	20.4	–6.5
Residents	1	1	Steady	0.0	2	3	5.0	1,242	2.9	+0.2
Independent	1	0	Steady	0.0	1	1	1.7	79	0.2	–0.9

== Ward results ==
=== Berechurch ===
Berechurch
Party	Candidate	Votes	%	±%
Alliance	H. Davis	1,342	45.0	+1.4
Labour	R. McQuitty	1,003	33.6	−5.8
Conservative	E. Parsons	640	21.4	+4.4
Majority		339	11.4	+7.2
Turnout		2,985	49.4	+2.4
Registered electors		6,046		
Alliance gain from Labour		Swing	▲3.6	

=== Castle ===
Castle
Party	Candidate	Votes	%	±%
Alliance	Chris Hall	1,309	43.8	+12.2
Conservative	E. Humphreys*	1,037	34.7	+6.1
Labour	S. Philpin	641	21.5	−18.3
Majority		272	9.1	N/A
Turnout		2,987	59.3	+6.1
Registered electors		5,039		
Alliance gain from Conservative		Swing	▲3.1	

=== Copford & Eight Ash Green ===
Copford & Eight Ash Green
Party	Candidate	Votes	%	±%
Conservative	C. Dymond*	722	64.6	−4.0
Alliance	B. Trusler	276	24.7	+8.9
Labour	S. Dick	120	10.7	−4.9
Majority		446	39.9	−12.9
Turnout		1,118	49.9	−0.5
Registered electors		2,242		
Conservative hold		Swing	▼6.5	

=== Great & Little Horksley ===
Great & Little Horksley
Party	Candidate	Votes	%	±%
Conservative	A. Allan	540	59.5	−8.8
Alliance	T. Hubbard	246	27.2	+4.3
Labour	Lucy Wood	122	13.4	+4.6
Majority		294	32.3	−20.5
Turnout		908	50.3	−0.1
Registered electors		1,804		
Conservative hold		Swing	▲6.6	

=== Great Tey ===
Great Tey
Party	Candidate	Votes	%	±%
Conservative	R. Browning*	598	64.6	−11.4
Alliance	G. Ambridge	254	27.5	+15.8
Labour	P. Doncaster	73	7.9	−4.4
Majority		344	37.1	−26.6
Turnout		925	53.3	+8.5
Registered electors		1,735		
Conservative hold		Swing	▼13.6	

=== Harbour ===
Harbour
Party	Candidate	Votes	%	±%
Alliance	E. Fowler	994	36.4	+1.8
Labour	B. Wilding	939	34.4	−9.6
Conservative	Mike Coyne	719	26.3	+6.4
Independent	D. Smith	79	2.9	N/A
Majority		55	2.0	N/A
Turnout		2,731	48.4	+3.2
Registered electors		5,637		
Alliance hold		Swing	▲5.7	

=== Lexden ===
Lexden
Party	Candidate	Votes	%	±%
Alliance	Ian Trusler*	1,324	52.3	−1.4
Conservative	Sonia Lewis	1,086	42.9	+2.3
Labour	J. Crawford	121	4.8	−0.9
Majority		238	9.4	−3.7
Turnout		2,531	58.9	+5.3
Registered electors		4,296		
Alliance hold		Swing	▼1.9	

=== Mile End ===
Mile End
Party	Candidate	Votes	%	±%
Conservative	D. Fulford*	942	51.9	+3.8
Alliance	W. Reid	617	34.0	+3.0
Labour	A. Hayden-Case	255	14.1	−6.8
Majority		325	17.9	+0.8
Turnout		1,814	44.9	+3.2
Registered electors		4,044		
Conservative hold		Swing	▲0.4	

=== New Town ===
New Town
Party	Candidate	Votes	%	±%
Alliance	J. Coleman*	1,090	55.2	−5.2
Labour	Sandra Benedetti	529	26.8	+2.1
Conservative	J. Clarke	355	18.0	+3.2
Majority		561	28.4	−7.3
Turnout		1,974	40.7	+1.4
Registered electors		4,856		
Alliance hold		Swing	▼3.7	

=== Prettygate ===
Prettygate
Party	Candidate	Votes	%	±%
Alliance	R. Yates	1,371	46.7	−8.3
Conservative	R. Stevenson	1,221	41.6	+10.1
Labour	G. Thompson	341	11.6	−1.8
Majority		150	5.1	−18.4
Turnout		2,933	58.0	+6.3
Registered electors		5,059		
Alliance gain from Conservative		Swing	▼9.2	

=== Pyefleet ===
Pyefleet
Party	Candidate	Votes	%	±%
Conservative	A. Parsonson	605	73.7	+7.4
Alliance	P. Mills	139	16.9	−5.5
Labour	J. Brice	77	9.4	−2.0
Majority		466	56.8	+12.9
Turnout		821	58.6	−5.8
Registered electors		1,401		
Conservative hold		Swing	▲6.5	

=== Shrub End ===
Shrub End
Party	Candidate	Votes	%	±%
Alliance	K. Starling	1,316	58.3	+1.0
Labour	Frank Wilkin*	526	23.3	−9.1
Conservative	A. Stevenson	415	18.4	+8.1
Majority		790	35.0	+10.1
Turnout		2,257	36.4	−0.4
Registered electors		6,196		
Alliance gain from Labour		Swing	▲5.1	

=== St. Andrew's ===
St. Andrew's
Party	Candidate	Votes	%	±%
Labour	J. Bayles	1,176	44.5	−14.9
Conservative	E. Winney	737	27.9	+5.9
Alliance	P. Smith	729	27.6	+9.0
Majority		439	16.6	−20.8
Turnout		2,642	29.9	+4.5
Registered electors		8,835		
Labour hold		Swing	▼10.4	

=== St. Anne's ===
St. Anne's
Party	Candidate	Votes	%	±%
Alliance	E. Crunden	997	40.2	+0.8
Conservative	H. Pawsey*	864	34.9	+6.0
Labour	Chris Pearson	618	24.9	−6.8
Majority		133	5.3	−2.4
Turnout		2,479	50.6	+4.3
Registered electors		4,903		
Alliance gain from Conservative		Swing	▼2.6	

=== St. John's ===
St. John's
Party	Candidate	Votes	%	±%
Alliance	John Baker	1,190	47.5	+2.0
Conservative	B. West*	1,116	44.5	+1.1
Labour	K. Hindle	200	8.0	−3.1
Majority		74	3.0	+0.9
Turnout		2,506	49.8	+3.5
Registered electors		5,034		
Alliance gain from Conservative		Swing	▲0.5	

=== St. Mary's ===
St. Mary's
Party	Candidate	Votes	%	±%
Conservative	R. Spendlove*	1,253	51.2	+3.6
Alliance	C. Curtis	801	32.7	+2.9
Labour	R. Turp	392	16.0	−6.7
Majority		452	18.5	+0.7
Turnout		2,446	49.6	+9.4
Registered electors		4,927		
Conservative hold		Swing	▲0.4	

=== Stanway ===
Stanway
Party	Candidate	Votes	%	±%
Conservative	J. Orpen-Smellie*	1,087	46.9	+6.0
Alliance	Colin Sykes	962	41.5	−2.5
Labour	N. Bullen	268	11.6	−3.5
Majority		125	5.4	N/A
Turnout		2,317	43.7	+3.0
Registered electors		5,305		
Conservative hold		Swing	▲4.3	

=== Tiptree ===
Tiptree
Party	Candidate	Votes	%	±%
Residents	J. Webb*	1,242	65.4	+4.9
Conservative	P. Bowdidge	456	24.0	−1.7
Labour	D. Chappell	202	10.6	−3.2
Majority		786	41.4	+6.6
Turnout		1,900	31.4	+0.9
Registered electors		6,044		
Residents hold		Swing	▲3.3	

=== West Mersea ===
West Mersea
Party	Candidate	Votes	%	±%
Conservative	J. Williams*	1,512	64.6	+2.6
Alliance	A. Stevens	685	29.3	−0.4
Labour	L. Shelley	142	6.1	−2.2
Majority		827	35.3	+3.0
Turnout		2,339	45.0	+7.6
Registered electors		5,193		
Conservative hold		Swing	▲1.5	

=== Wivenhoe ===
Wivenhoe
Party	Candidate	Votes	%	±%
Conservative	M. Last*	1,283	48.7	+11.0
Labour	Robert Newman	1,089	41.3	−1.1
Alliance	L. Footring	265	10.0	−9.9
Majority		194	7.4	N/A
Turnout		2,637	43.6	+2.7
Registered electors		6,043		
Conservative hold		Swing	▲6.1	
