= 1987 Worthing Borough Council election =

1987 English local election

- 7 May 1987

12 out of 36 seats to Worthing Borough Council 19 seats needed for a majority

	First party	Second party
Party	Conservative	Alliance
Last election	22 seats, 47.1%	14 seats, 42.6%
Seats won	10	2
Seats after	24	12
Seat change	▲2	▼2
Popular vote	18,924	12,271
Percentage	56.1%	36.3%
Swing	▲9.0%	▼6.3%
Council control before election
Conservative
Council control after election
Conservative

The 1987 Worthing Borough Council election took place on 7 May 1987 to elect members of Worthing Borough Council in West Sussex, England. This was on the same day as other local elections.

== Summary ==
=== Election result ===
1987 Worthing Borough Council election
Party	This election				Full council			This election		
Party	Candidates	Seats	Net	Seats %	Other	Total	Total %	Votes	Votes %	+/−
Conservative	{{{candidates}}}	10	▲2	83.3	14	24	66.7	18,924	56.1	+9.0
Alliance	{{{candidates}}}	2	▼2	16.7	10	12	33.3	12,271	36.3	–6.3
Labour	{{{candidates}}}	0	Steady	0.0	0	0	0.0	2,566	7.6	–2.7

== Ward results ==
=== Broadwater ===
Broadwater
Party	Candidate	Votes	%	±%
Alliance	A. Clare*	1,660	62.6	+4.4
Conservative	S. Wilton	832	31.4	–1.7
Labour	B. Croft	159	6.0	–2.6
Majority		828	31.2	+6.1
Turnout		2,651	40.6	+2.9
Registered electors		6,526		
Alliance hold		Swing	▲3.1	

=== Castle ===
Castle
Party	Candidate	Votes	%	±%
Conservative	R. Orridge	1,269	49.4	+12.9
Alliance	J. Horgan*	1,084	42.2	–6.1
Labour	J. Hammond	217	8.4	–6.9
Majority		185	7.2	N/A
Turnout		2,570	40.6	+7.2
Registered electors		6,337		
Conservative gain from Alliance		Swing	▲9.5	

=== Central ===
Central
Party	Candidate	Votes	%	±%
Conservative	R. Price	949	45.3	+6.4
Alliance	W. Wharton	919	43.9	–6.3
Labour	J. Dean	226	10.8	–0.1
Majority		30	1.4	N/A
Turnout		2,094	36.8	+4.4
Registered electors		5,699		
Conservative gain from Alliance		Swing	▲6.4	

=== Durrington ===
Durrington
Party	Candidate	Votes	%	±%
Conservative	J. Cotton*	1,495	48.2	+12.3
Alliance	M. Stephens	1,382	44.5	–11.7
Labour	J. Dean	226	7.3	–4.8
Majority		113	3.7	N/A
Turnout		3,103	47.6	+6.6
Registered electors		6,466		
Conservative hold		Swing	▲12.0	

=== Gaisford ===
Gaisford
Party	Candidate	Votes	%	±%
Alliance	P. Bennett*	1,333	47.4	–2.7
Conservative	R. Goodhind	1,287	45.8	+7.5
Labour	J. Hurcombe	193	6.9	–4.7
Majority		46	1.6	–10.2
Turnout		2,813	44.1	+7.4
Registered electors		6,388		
Alliance hold		Swing	▼5.1	

=== Goring ===
Goring
Party	Candidate	Votes	%	±%
Conservative	B. Lynn*	2,379	66.6	+8.8
Alliance	M. Clayden	1,053	29.5	–6.8
Labour	E. Shannon	140	3.9	–2.1
Majority		1,326	37.1	+15.6
Turnout		3,572	51.9	+10.2
Registered electors		6,890		
Conservative hold		Swing	▲7.8	

=== Heene ===
Heene
Party	Candidate	Votes	%	±%
Conservative	H. Piggott*	1,835	67.9	+5.3
Alliance	S. Kift	690	25.5	–3.7
Labour	S. Deen	179	6.6	–1.6
Majority		1,145	42.3	+8.9
Turnout		2,704	41.3	+4.2
Registered electors		6,548		
Conservative hold		Swing	▲4.5	

=== Marine ===
Marine
Party	Candidate	Votes	%	±%
Conservative	D. Hill*	2,054	71.1	+12.1
Alliance	R. Selley	654	22.6	–11.5
Labour	H. King	181	6.3	–0.6
Majority		1,400	48.5	+23.7
Turnout		2,889	45.8	+4.5
Registered electors		6,325		
Conservative hold		Swing	▲11.8	

=== Offington ===
Offington
Party	Candidate	Votes	%	±%
Conservative	C. Scott*	1,951	67.1	+5.9
Alliance	E. Mardell	822	28.3	–4.5
Labour	B. Wright	133	4.6	–1.4
Majority		1,129	38.9	+10.5
Turnout		2,906	46.3	+9.2
Registered electors		6,280		
Conservative hold		Swing	▲5.2	

=== Salvington ===
Salvington
Party	Candidate	Votes	%	±%
Conservative	H. Braden*	1,997	66.6	+8.3
Alliance	D. Nash	817	27.2	–6.6
Labour	Y. Griffiths	185	6.2	–1.7
Majority		1,180	39.3	+14.8
Turnout		2,999	43.8	+3.1
Registered electors		6,698		
Conservative hold		Swing	▲7.5	

=== Selden ===
Selden
Party	Candidate	Votes	%	±%
Conservative	B. Kemp	1,323	52.2	+9.3
Alliance	C. Hellstrom	715	28.2	–5.5
Labour	B. Frost	498	19.6	–3.8
Majority		608	24.0	+14.8
Turnout		2,536	40.3	+3.3
Registered electors		6,298		
Conservative hold		Swing	▲7.4	

=== Tarring ===
Tarring
Party	Candidate	Votes	%	±%
Conservative	H. Yates*	1,553	53.1	+9.3
Alliance	M. Allen	1,142	39.1	–6.0
Labour	S. Peaty	229	7.8	–3.3
Majority		411	14.1	N/A
Turnout		2,924	44.9	+6.6
Registered electors		6,526		
Conservative hold		Swing	▲7.7	
