= 1987 Luton Borough Council election =

Local election in England

- 7 May 1987

All 48 seats to Luton Borough Council 25 seats needed for a majority

	First party	Second party	Third party
Party	Conservative	Labour	Alliance
Seats won	32	13	3
Seat change	▲7	▼4	▼3
Popular vote	73,298	51,891	34,121
Percentage	45.7%	32.4%	21.3%
Swing	▲6.5%	▼5.5%	▼1.1%
Control before election
Conservative
Control after election
Conservative

The 1987 Luton Borough Council election took place on 7 May 1987 to elect members of Luton Borough Council in Bedfordshire, England. This was on the same day as other local elections.

== Summary ==
=== Election result ===
1987 Luton Borough Council election
Party	Candidates	Seats	Gains	Losses	Net gain/loss	Seats %	Votes %	Votes	+/−
Conservative	48	32	7	0	▲7	66.7	45.7	73,298	+6.5
Labour	48	13	0	4	▼4	27.1	32.4	51,891	–5.5
Alliance	48	3	0	3	▼3	6.3	21.3	34,121	–1.1
Independent Labour	1	0	0	0	Steady	0.0	0.5	777	N/A
Independent	1	0	0	0	Steady	0.0	0.2	258	–0.1

== Ward results ==
Incumbent councillors standing for re-election are marked with an asterisk (*). Changes in seats do not take into account by-elections or defections.

=== Biscot ===
Biscot (3 seats)
Party	Candidate	Votes	%	±%
Labour	R. Davis*	1,499	46.6	+2.7
Labour	M. Guha*	1,404	43.7	+2.5
Labour	D. Stewart*	1,336	41.6	+0.5
Conservative	M. Hussain	1,314	40.9	+9.6
Conservative	S. Rizvi	1,182	36.8	+7.1
Conservative	M. Rathor	1,151	35.8	+8.5
Alliance	P. McKenna	400	12.4	+1.7
Alliance	D. Jarrett	347	10.8	+2.4
Alliance	V. Williams	345	10.7	+2.9
Turnout		~3,213	46.7	–6.7
Registered electors		6,881		
Labour hold				
Labour hold				
Labour hold				

=== Bramingham ===
Bramingham (3 seats)
Party	Candidate	Votes	%	±%
Conservative	P. Glenister*	1,939	55.4	+9.3
Conservative	R. Dean	1,865	53.3	+9.2
Conservative	F. Lester*	1,858	53.1	+10.7
Labour	R. Furness*	800	22.9	–19.9
Alliance	D. Owens	757	21.6	+10.4
Labour	N. Rana	729	20.8	–21.1
Labour	S. Deb Gupta	720	20.6	–19.4
Alliance	J. Greener	713	20.4	+9.6
Alliance	H. Siederer	604	17.3	+7.0
Turnout		~3,498	47.5	–0.7
Registered electors		7,365		
Conservative hold				
Conservative gain from Labour				
Conservative hold				

=== Challney ===
Challney (3 seats)
Party	Candidate	Votes	%	±%
Conservative	B. Dodd*	1,869	52.1	+3.6
Conservative	M. McCarroll*	1,815	50.6	+3.2
Conservative	R. Samuels	1,656	46.2	–0.6
Labour	R. Cartwright	1,170	32.6	–0.9
Labour	L. Collier	1,142	31.9	+0.4
Labour	S. Roden	1,077	30.0	+2.9
Alliance	M. Gearty	546	15.2	–2.8
Alliance	T. Ruffett	517	14.4	–1.7
Alliance	J. Singh	380	10.6	–4.7
Turnout		~3,585	45.5	+0.5
Registered electors		7,879		
Conservative hold				
Conservative hold				
Conservative hold				

=== Crawley ===
Crawley (3 seats)
Party	Candidate	Votes	%	±%
Alliance	D. Franks*	1,633	41.0	–8.7
Alliance	P. Chapman*	1,544	38.8	–6.9
Alliance	L. Patterson	1,474	37.0	–8.6
Conservative	R. Robinson	1,369	34.4	+9.1
Conservative	D. Dallinger	1,345	33.8	+8.7
Conservative	M. Uddin	1,152	28.9	+8.4
Labour	J. Adams	981	24.6	–0.4
Labour	C. Kightley	959	24.1	–0.3
Labour	R. Lacey	932	23.4	+0.4
Turnout		~3,980	49.2	–1.5
Registered electors		8,089		
Alliance hold				
Alliance hold				
Alliance hold				

=== Dallow ===
Dallow (3 seats)
Party	Candidate	Votes	%	±%
Labour	M. Ashraf	1,373	50.9	–7.4
Labour	R. Sills*	1,293	48.0	–7.3
Labour	D. Taylor	1,284	47.6	–6.4
Conservative	R. Cartwright	942	34.9	+15.0
Conservative	A. Rashid	851	31.6	+11.7
Conservative	S. Choudhury	849	31.5	+12.3
Alliance	J. Stephens	379	14.1	–7.7
Alliance	J. Doble	354	13.1	–8.5
Alliance	P. Cowell	348	12.9	–6.7
Turnout		~2,696	39.0	–5.0
Registered electors		6,914		
Labour hold				
Labour hold				
Labour hold				

=== Farley ===
Farley (3 seats)
Party	Candidate	Votes	%	±%
Labour	L. McCowan*	1,721	57.0	–0.6
Labour	W. McKenzie*	1,673	55.4	–2.1
Labour	D. Fuller*	1,660	55.0	–0.4
Conservative	D. Parker	866	28.7	+5.3
Conservative	K. Stokes	836	27.7	+4.4
Conservative	T. Stokes	808	26.8	+4.9
Alliance	P. Duffy	432	14.3	+0.4
Alliance	D. Chapman	426	14.1	+0.7
Alliance	B. Murray	414	13.7	+2.4
Turnout		~3,020	42.0	–3.6
Registered electors		7,190		
Labour hold				
Labour hold				
Labour hold				

=== High Town ===
High Town (3 seats)
Party	Candidate	Votes	%	±%
Conservative	L. Coppard	1,233	39.0	+3.5
Labour	J. Fensome*	1,196	37.9	+1.5
Conservative	S. Everard	1,182	37.4	+2.3
Conservative	C. Field	1,166	36.9	+2.0
Labour	H. Magill	1,097	34.7	+2.3
Labour	L. Randall	1,026	32.5	+1.0
Alliance	T. Keens	729	23.1	–5.0
Alliance	L. Cowell	673	21.3	–3.0
Alliance	M. Doble	601	19.0	–2.7
Turnout		~3,159	46.8	+1.1
Registered electors		6,750		
Conservative hold				
Labour hold				
Conservative hold				

=== Icknield ===
Icknield (3 seats)
Party	Candidate	Votes	%	±%
Conservative	V. Dunington*	2,970	69.6	+2.0
Conservative	A. Flint	2,827	66.2	–1.4
Conservative	D. Johnston*	2,785	65.3	–0.1
Labour	L. Hughes	664	15.6	–5.4
Alliance	R. Henderson	630	14.8	+3.4
Labour	R. Lucas	627	14.7	–4.6
Labour	J. Robson	609	14.3	–4.9
Alliance	G. Jacobi	557	13.1	+1.9
Alliance	M. Large	544	12.7	+1.6
Turnout		~4,268	51.0	+0.6
Registered electors		8,368		
Conservative hold				
Conservative hold				
Conservative hold				

=== Leagrave ===
Leagrave (3 seats)
Party	Candidate	Votes	%	±%
Conservative	M. Garrett*	1,632	49.0	+3.5
Conservative	J. Goldsmith*	1,478	44.3	+4.9
Conservative	M. Punter*	1,423	42.7	+4.5
Labour	A. Roden	1,154	34.6	–3.5
Labour	H. Simmons	1,146	34.4	–2.6
Labour	M. Yasin	990	29.7	–5.9
Alliance	B. Doward	548	16.4	+0.1
Alliance	J. Gilmour	546	16.4	+0.4
Alliance	M. Doward	535	16.0	+2.2
Turnout		~3,334	43.3	+1.6
Registered electors		7,699		
Conservative hold				
Conservative hold				
Conservative hold				

=== Lewsey ===
Lewsey (3 seats)
Party	Candidate	Votes	%	±%
Labour	J. Hamill*	1,316	35.5	–13.5
Labour	L. Brown	1,307	35.2	–12.5
Labour	T. Shaw	1,292	34.8	–5.6
Conservative	J. Pattinson	1,119	30.2	+7.5
Conservative	C. Sangster	1,117	30.1	+7.6
Conservative	S. Tucker	1,052	28.3	+5.8
Independent Labour	D. Kennedy	777	20.9	N/A
Alliance	D. Larkman	501	13.5	–11.7
Alliance	D. De-Groot	478	12.9	–12.3
Alliance	C. Mead	460	12.4	–10.7
Turnout		~3,711	43.0	+2.6
Registered electors		8,631		
Labour hold				
Labour hold				
Labour hold				

=== Limbury ===
Limbury (3 seats)
Party	Candidate	Votes	%	±%
Conservative	C. Brown	1,753	46.9	+2.9
Conservative	E. Gough	1,744	46.7	+2.9
Conservative	J. Man	1,631	43.6	+2.2
Labour	A. Cook	1,043	27.9	–7.7
Labour	D. Kilby	1,010	27.0	–6.2
Labour	M. Qureshi	831	22.2	–8.5
Alliance	G. Brown	684	18.3	–2.1
Alliance	B. King	628	16.8	–2.2
Alliance	M. Neufville	521	13.9	–4.4
Independent	J. Hayden	258	6.9	N/A
Turnout		~3,737	49.9	+4.4
Registered electors		7,489		
Conservative hold				
Conservative hold				
Conservative hold				

=== Putteridge ===
Putteridge (3 seats)
Party	Candidate	Votes	%	±%
Conservative	M. Harris	2,130	47.4	+11.8
Conservative	D. Curd	2,042	45.5	+12.2
Conservative	D. Morley	2,026	45.1	+12.1
Alliance	R. Davies*	1,689	37.6	–2.1
Alliance	D. Woodroffe*	1,514	33.7	–0.1
Alliance	K. Onslow	1,465	32.6	+0.2
Labour	K. Bruckdorfer	675	15.0	–9.7
Labour	B. Chambers	667	14.8	–9.5
Labour	R. Johl	605	13.5	–10.3
Turnout		~4,493	51.1	–1.8
Registered electors		8,792		
Conservative gain from Alliance				
Conservative hold				
Conservative gain from Alliance				

=== Saints ===
Saints (3 seats)
Party	Candidate	Votes	%	±%
Conservative	M. Goldsmith	1,725	47.0	–0.2
Conservative	A. Shackleton	1,711	46.6	+0.4
Conservative	P. Welsey*	1,684	45.9	+2.0
Labour	M. Heathcote	1,343	36.6	–0.9
Labour	P. Broadhead	1,283	35.0	–1.7
Labour	R. Robertson	1,264	34.4	–1.8
Alliance	T. Kenneally	602	16.4	+1.2
Alliance	G. James	594	16.2	+1.8
Alliance	S. Kenneally	575	15.7	+1.7
Turnout		~3,670	48.5	+1.7
Registered electors		7,566		
Conservative hold				
Conservative hold				
Conservative hold				

=== South ===
South (3 seats)
Party	Candidate	Votes	%	±%
Conservative	A. Bush*	1,363	45.2	–4.6
Conservative	L. Benson*	1,332	44.1	–4.0
Conservative	G. Boote*	1,310	43.4	–4.4
Labour	C. Rumbold	923	30.6	–2.0
Labour	M. Russell	876	29.0	–2.5
Labour	H. Samms	810	26.8	–4.4
Alliance	C. Kennedy	735	24.3	+10.8
Alliance	T. Hayden	731	24.2	+10.7
Alliance	J. Felmingham	728	24.1	+11.6
Turnout		~3,019	41.1	+1.9
Registered electors		7,345		
Conservative hold				
Conservative hold				
Conservative hold				

=== Stopsley ===
Stopsley (3 seats)
Party	Candidate	Votes	%	±%
Conservative	G. Dillingham*	1,725	45.0	+5.7
Conservative	J. Wright	1,559	40.7	+3.4
Conservative	P. Locke	1,532	40.0	+3.5
Alliance	J. Davies*	1,286	33.5	–4.3
Alliance	M. Dolling	1,150	30.0	–2.7
Alliance	W. Cole	1,084	28.3	–2.9
Labour	P. Blanking	826	21.5	–1.4
Labour	D. McKenzie	789	20.6	–1.7
Labour	W. Pratt	769	20.1	–1.7
Turnout		~3,834	54.2	+1.2
Registered electors		7,074		
Conservative hold				
Conservative gain from Alliance				
Conservative hold				

=== Sundon Park ===
Sundon Park (3 seats)
Party	Candidate	Votes	%	±%
Conservative	K. Childs	1,494	42.1	+10.9
Conservative	K. Scott	1,493	42.1	+11.2
Conservative	M. Smith	1,393	39.3	+9.0
Labour	E. Haldane*	1,364	38.5	–11.2
Labour	W. Griffin	1,327	37.4	–9.7
Labour	S. Knight	1,309	36.9	–8.9
Alliance	D. Hinkley	689	19.4	+0.4
Alliance	M. Robinson	532	15.0	–2.0
Alliance	D. Scrivener	502	14.2	–2.3
Turnout		~3,547	44.8	–0.6
Registered electors		7,918		
Conservative gain from Labour				
Conservative gain from Labour				
Conservative gain from Labour				
