= 1987 Leicester City Council election =

1987 English local election

The 1987 Leicester City Council election took place on 7 May 1987 to elect members of Leicester City Council in England. This was on the same day as other local elections.

From this election, the council moved from staggered council elections back to all-out elections.

== Summary ==
1987 Leicester City Council election
Party	Seats	Gains	Losses	Net gain/loss	Seats %	Votes %	Votes	+/−
Labour	34			▼5	60.7	42.7	84,720	–0.7
Conservative	16			Steady	28.6	38.2	75,851	+4.1
Alliance	6			▲5	10.7	18.7	36,991	–2.7
Green	0			Steady	0.0	0.3	585	–0.7
Independent	0			Steady	0.0	0.1	123	N/A
BNP	0			Steady	0.0	<0.1	61	N/A
