= 1987 North Bedfordshire Borough Council election =

North Bedfordshire Borough Council election

The 1987 North Bedfordshire Borough Council election took place on 7 May 1987 to elect members of North Bedfordshire Borough Council in England. This was on the same day as other local elections.

== Summary ==
=== Election result ===
1987 North Bedfordshire Borough Council election
Party	This election			Full council			This election		
Party	Seats	Net	Seats %	Other	Total	Total %	Votes	Votes %	+/−
Conservative	13	▲3	75.0	13	26	49.1	18,919	47.4	+13.6
Alliance	2	▼1	12.5	12	14	26.4	9,821	24.6	–8.3
Labour	2	▼2	12.5	10	12	22.6	11,032	27.6	–5.6
Independent	0	Steady	0.0	1	1	1.9	104	0.3	N/A
Communist	0	Steady	0.0	0	0	0.0	37	0.1	±0.0

== Ward results ==
=== Brickhill ===
Brickhill
Party	Candidate	Votes	%	±%
Conservative	M. Humphrys	1,753	50.8	−2.7
Alliance	J. Struthers	1,314	38.0	+6.0
Labour	H. Mitchell	387	11.2	−3.3
Turnout		3,454	56.6	
Conservative hold		Swing		

=== Bromham ===
Bromham
Party	Candidate	Votes	%	±%
Conservative	S. Herring	1,655	70.1	+3.7
Alliance	E. Edwards	559	23.7	−16.1
Labour	A. Albone	148	6.3	−10.0
Turnout		2,362	60.8	
Conservative hold		Swing		

=== Castle ===
Castle
Party	Candidate	Votes	%	±%
Conservative	M. Dewar*	1,319	50.2	+5.3
Labour	S. Billingham	911	34.7	+5.0
Alliance	W. Wright	399	15.2	−10.2
Turnout		2,629	59.3	
Conservative hold		Swing		

=== Cauldwell ===
Cauldwell
Party	Candidate	Votes	%	±%
Labour	W. Astle*	1,328	53.8	−8.6
Conservative	R. Pal	845	34.2	+13.6
Alliance	K. Jones	259	10.5	−4.4
Communist	P. Waite	37	1.5	−0.6
Turnout		2,469	44.0	
Labour hold		Swing		

=== Clapham ===
Clapham
Party	Candidate	Votes	%	±%
Conservative	F. Sparrow	681	44.3	+16.7
Alliance	D. Wickens	617	40.1	−5.3
Labour	J. Cartlidge	239	15.5	−11.5
Turnout		1,537	51.5	
Conservative gain from Alliance		Swing		

=== De Parys ===
De Parys
Party	Candidate	Votes	%	±%
Conservative	J. Barley*	1,458	49.2	−6.5
Alliance	P. Dixon	1,172	39.5	+11.7
Labour	B. Jones	335	11.3	−5.2
Turnout		2,965	53.7	
Conservative hold		Swing		

=== Goldington ===
Goldington
Party	Candidate	Votes	%	±%
Alliance	S. Gillard	1,245	44.5	−2.9
Labour	F. Garrick	820	29.3	−2.0
Conservative	V. Fulford	732	26.2	+5.0
Turnout		2,797	51.1	
Alliance hold		Swing		

=== Great Barford ===
Great Barford
Party	Candidate	Votes	%	±%
Conservative	D. Fordham*	750	76.8	+15.8
Labour	E. Grugeon	149	15.3	+8.9
Alliance	B. Gibbons	77	7.9	−24.7
Turnout		976	51.2	
Conservative hold		Swing		

=== Harpur ===
Harpur
Party	Candidate	Votes	%	±%
Conservative	B. Dillingham*	1,310	49.5	−10.5
Labour	C. Atkins	1,127	42.6	+14.1
Alliance	P. Chybalski	211	8.0	−3.4
Turnout		2,648	50.4	
Conservative hold		Swing		

=== Kempston East ===
Kempston East
Party	Candidate	Votes	%	±%
Conservative	N. Attenborough*	1,786	54.4	+6.5
Labour	O. Wesley	1,097	33.4	−6.4
Alliance	D. Johnson	399	12.2	+4.1
Turnout		3,282	48.7	
Conservative hold		Swing		

=== Kempston Rural ===
Kempston Rural (1)
Party	Candidate	Votes	%	±%
Conservative	D. Tucker	837	71.6	+4.2
Alliance	S. Sawford	173	14.8	−2.3
Labour	M. Sargeant	159	13.6	−1.9
Turnout		1,169	55.6	
Conservative hold		Swing		

=== Kempston West ===
Kempston West
Party	Candidate	Votes	%	±%
Conservative	E. Joy	1,453	55.7	+13.5
Labour	A. Beardmore	860	33.0	−7.4
Alliance	M. Dimmock	295	11.3	−6.2
Turnout		2,608	47.2	
Conservative hold		Swing		

=== Kingsbrook ===
Kingsbrook
Party	Candidate	Votes	%	±%
Alliance	M. Nesbitt	1,152	43.9	+10.2
Labour	A. Tester	965	36.8	−9.0
Conservative	M. Mactoom	507	19.3	−1.3
Turnout		2,624	48.1	
Alliance gain from Labour		Swing		

=== Putnoe ===
Putnoe
Party	Candidate	Votes	%	±%
Conservative	J. Moore	1,661	51.9	+8.0
Alliance	J. Lennon	1,289	40.3	−7.6
Labour	G. Wilson	248	7.8	−0.4
Turnout		3,198	56.6	
Conservative gain from Alliance		Swing		

=== Queen's Park ===
Queen's Park
Party	Candidate	Votes	%	±%
Labour	M. George*	1,352	63.2	+3.8
Conservative	M. Williams	560	26.2	−4.4
Alliance	T. Kirby	227	10.6	+3.8
Turnout		2,139	40.9	
Labour hold		Swing		

=== Sharnbrook ===
Sharnbrook
Party	Candidate	Votes	%	±%
Conservative	R. Pearson*	739	65.4	+0.9
Alliance	A. Nicholson	279	24.7	−2.5
Labour	R. Tysoe	112	9.9	+1.6
Turnout		1,130	55.7	
Conservative hold		Swing		

=== Wootton ===
Wootton
Party	Candidate	Votes	%	±%
Conservative	R. Hyde	873	45.3	+9.2
Labour	B. Keens*	795	41.3	+26.1
Alliance	A. Travis	154	8.0	+2.3
Independent	P. Quirk	104	5.4	−17.7
Turnout		1,926	54.6	
Conservative gain from Independent		Swing		

Labour had previously gained the Independent seat in a by-election.
