= 1987 Hertsmere Borough Council election =

Local election in England

- 7 May 1987

14 out of 39 seats to Hertsmere Borough Council 20 seats needed for a majority
- Registered: 43,038
- Turnout: 49.6% (▲1.1%)

| | First party | Second party | Third party |
|---|---|---|---|
| Party | Conservative | Labour | Alliance |
| Seats won | 5 | 7 | 2 |
| Seats after | 22 | 12 | 5 |
| Seat change | Steady | Steady | Steady |
| Popular vote | 9,135 | 6,306 | 5,896 |
| Percentage | 42.8% | 29.6% | 27.6% |
| Swing | ▼3.3% | ▲8.4% | ▼5.1% |
- Winner of each seat at the 1987 Hertsmere Borough Council election. Wards in white were not contested.
Control before election
Conservative
Control after election
Conservative

The 1987 Hertsmere Borough Council election took place on 7 May 1987 to elect members of Hertsmere Borough Council in Hertfordshire, England. This was on the same day as other local elections.

== Summary ==
=== Election result ===
1987 Hertsmere Borough Council election
| Party | This election | | | | Full council | | | This election | | |
| Party | Candidates | Seats | Net | Seats % | Other | Total | Total % | Votes | Votes % | +/− |
|---|---|---|---|---|---|---|---|---|---|---|
| Conservative | {{{candidates}}} | 5 | Steady | 35.7 | 17 | 22 | 56.4 | 9,135 | 42.8 | –3.3 |
| Labour | {{{candidates}}} | 7 | Steady | 50.0 | 5 | 12 | 30.8 | 6,306 | 29.6 | +8.4 |
| Alliance | {{{candidates}}} | 2 | Steady | 14.3 | 3 | 5 | 12.8 | 5,896 | 27.6 | –5.1 |

== Ward results ==
Incumbent councillors standing for re-election are marked with an asterisk (*). Changes in seats do not take into account by-elections or defections.

=== Aldenham East ===
Aldenham East
| Party | Candidate | Votes | % | ±% |
|---|---|---|---|---|
| Conservative | T. Gilligan* | 1,306 | 67.8 | +5.1 |
| Alliance | D. Prater | 511 | 26.5 | –1.0 |
| Labour | R. Page | 108 | 5.6 | –4.2 |
| Majority | | 795 | 41.3 | +6.1 |
| Turnout | | 1,925 | 54.9 | –0.4 |
| Registered electors | | 3,506 | | |
| Conservative hold | | Swing | ▲3.1 | |

=== Aldenham West ===
Aldenham West
| Party | Candidate | Votes | % | ±% |
|---|---|---|---|---|
| Conservative | G. Nunn* | 1,030 | 53.1 | –0.6 |
| Alliance | C. Treves-Brown | 524 | 27.0 | +5.8 |
| Labour | A. Page | 384 | 19.8 | –5.3 |
| Majority | | 506 | 26.1 | –2.5 |
| Turnout | | 1,938 | 54.5 | +8.6 |
| Registered electors | | 3,556 | | |
| Conservative hold | | Swing | ▼3.2 | |

=== Brookmeadow ===
Brookmeadow (2 seats due to by-election)
| Party | Candidate | Votes | % | ±% |
|---|---|---|---|---|
| Labour | D. Button* | 723 | 59.4 | –15.5 |
| Labour | A. Whitby | 677 | 55.6 | –19.3 |
| Conservative | N. Gorman | 292 | 24.0 | +9.0 |
| Alliance | J. Reefe | 203 | 16.7 | +6.3 |
| Conservative | R. Calcutt | 201 | 16.5 | +1.6 |
| Alliance | B. Swindon | 174 | 14.3 | +4.0 |
| Turnout | | ~1,220 | 41.4 | –2.6 |
| Registered electors | | 2,942 | | |
| Labour hold | | | | |
| Labour hold | | | | |

=== Campions ===
Campions
| Party | Candidate | Votes | % | ±% |
|---|---|---|---|---|
| Labour | J. Nolan* | 517 | 62.9 | –2.5 |
| Conservative | A. Begg | 158 | 19.2 | +2.0 |
| Alliance | J. Stevens | 147 | 17.9 | +0.5 |
| Majority | | 359 | 43.7 | –4.5 |
| Turnout | | 822 | 43.4 | –3.0 |
| Registered electors | | 1,894 | | |
| Labour hold | | Swing | ▼2.3 | |

=== Cowley ===
Cowley
| Party | Candidate | Votes | % | ±% |
|---|---|---|---|---|
| Labour | A. Rosier* | 708 | 50.1 | –23.6 |
| Conservative | J. Gunther | 432 | 30.6 | +4.3 |
| Alliance | A. Jacobs | 273 | 19.3 | N/A |
| Majority | | 276 | 19.5 | –27.9 |
| Turnout | | 1,413 | 34.6 | +7.5 |
| Registered electors | | 4,084 | | |
| Labour hold | | Swing | ▼14.0 | |

=== Elstree ===
Elstree
| Party | Candidate | Votes | % | ±% |
|---|---|---|---|---|
| Conservative | R. Keating* | 1,175 | 66.6 | +9.0 |
| Alliance | M. Kirsh | 335 | 19.0 | –6.7 |
| Labour | J. Cartledge | 254 | 14.4 | –2.3 |
| Majority | | 840 | 47.6 | +15.7 |
| Turnout | | 1,764 | 43.7 | –2.3 |
| Registered electors | | 4,037 | | |
| Conservative hold | | Swing | ▲7.9 | |

=== Hillside ===
Hillside
| Party | Candidate | Votes | % | ±% |
|---|---|---|---|---|
| Labour | P. Rose* | 703 | 45.7 | –9.0 |
| Conservative | H. Stevens | 587 | 38.2 | +5.6 |
| Alliance | A. Kirsh | 247 | 16.1 | +3.4 |
| Majority | | 116 | 7.5 | –14.6 |
| Turnout | | 1,537 | 45.0 | +10.5 |
| Registered electors | | 3,416 | | |
| Labour hold | | Swing | ▼7.3 | |

=== Kenilworth ===
Kenilworth
| Party | Candidate | Votes | % | ±% |
|---|---|---|---|---|
| Labour | F. Ward* | 663 | 49.6 | –9.1 |
| Conservative | J. Marks | 407 | 30.5 | +9.0 |
| Alliance | J. Sayers | 266 | 19.9 | ±0.0 |
| Majority | | 256 | 19.2 | –18.1 |
| Turnout | | 1,336 | 44.7 | –2.5 |
| Registered electors | | 2,989 | | |
| Labour hold | | Swing | ▼9.0 | |

=== Lyndhurst ===
Lyndhurst
| Party | Candidate | Votes | % | ±% |
|---|---|---|---|---|
| Labour | H. Caylor | 681 | 40.2 | –7.8 |
| Conservative | A. Rosansky | 557 | 32.9 | –7.9 |
| Alliance | L. Reefe | 454 | 26.8 | +15.6 |
| Majority | | 124 | 7.3 | –0.1 |
| Turnout | | 1,692 | 51.7 | +9.9 |
| Registered electors | | 3,273 | | |
| Labour hold | | Swing | ▲0.1 | |

=== Mill ===
Mill
| Party | Candidate | Votes | % | ±% |
|---|---|---|---|---|
| Alliance | M. Colne* | 1,467 | 72.4 | +14.6 |
| Conservative | J. Stainton | 388 | 19.2 | –7.6 |
| Labour | M. Taylor | 170 | 8.4 | –7.1 |
| Majority | | 1,079 | 53.3 | +22.2 |
| Turnout | | 2,025 | 58.0 | +8.8 |
| Registered electors | | 3,491 | | |
| Alliance hold | | Swing | ▲11.1 | |

=== Potters Bar East ===
Potters Bar East
| Party | Candidate | Votes | % | ±% |
|---|---|---|---|---|
| Conservative | B. Watson* | 1,360 | 61.8 | +10.2 |
| Alliance | D. Martin | 510 | 23.2 | –1.3 |
| Labour | P. Bradbury | 332 | 15.1 | –8.8 |
| Majority | | 850 | 38.6 | +11.5 |
| Turnout | | 2,202 | 45.4 | +2.1 |
| Registered electors | | 4,850 | | |
| Conservative hold | | Swing | ▲5.8 | |

=== Potters Bar West ===
Potters Bar West
| Party | Candidate | Votes | % | ±% |
|---|---|---|---|---|
| Conservative | E. Muddle* | 956 | 63.6 | +4.9 |
| Alliance | J. Hurd | 546 | 36.4 | +12.4 |
| Majority | | 410 | 27.3 | –7.4 |
| Turnout | | 1,502 | 43.8 | +7.2 |
| Registered electors | | 3,429 | | |
| Conservative hold | | Swing | ▼3.8 | |

=== Shenley ===
Shenley
| Party | Candidate | Votes | % | ±% |
|---|---|---|---|---|
| Labour | W. Hogan | 386 | 42.4 | –5.0 |
| Conservative | P. Banton | 286 | 31.4 | –0.8 |
| Alliance | A. Mallach | 239 | 26.2 | +5.8 |
| Majority | | 100 | 11.0 | –4.2 |
| Turnout | | 911 | 58.0 | +5.2 |
| Registered electors | | 1,571 | | |
| Labour hold | | Swing | ▼2.1 | |
