= 1987 St Albans City and District Council election =

1987 English local election

The 1987 St Albans City and District Council election took place on 7 May 1987 to elect members of St Albans City and District Council in England. This was on the same day as other local elections.

== Summary ==
1987 St Albans City and District Council election
Party	This election			Full council			This election		
Party	Seats	Net	Seats %	Other	Total	Total %	Votes	Votes %	+/−
Conservative	12	▲2	63.2	13	25	43.9	23,347	44.8	+7.3
Alliance	5	▼1	26.3	19	24	42.1	20,713	39.7	+0.3
Labour	2	▼1	10.5	5	7	12.3	7,591	14.6	–4.6
Independent	0	Steady	0.0	1	1	1.8	115	0.2	–1.9
Green	0	Steady	0.0	0	0	0.0	346	0.7	+0.1

== Ward results ==
=== Ashley ===
Ashley
Party	Candidate	Votes	%	±%
Alliance	S. Skipp	1,384	53.1	+4.6
Conservative	S. Capper	842	32.3	+2.0
Labour	C. Leet	379	14.5	–6.7
Majority		542	20.8	+2.6
Turnout		2,605	52.2	+3.2
Registered electors		4,994		
Alliance hold		Swing	▲1.3	

=== Batchwood ===
Batchwood
Party	Candidate	Votes	%	±%
Labour	P. Hiscott*	1,053	37.1	–1.0
Alliance	N. Frosick	982	34.6	–2.9
Conservative	A. Wells-Baker	710	25.0	+0.5
Green	A. James	95	3.3	N/A
Majority		71	2.5	N/A
Turnout		2,840	58.2	+9.2
Registered electors		4,882		
Labour hold		Swing	▲1.0	

=== Clarence ===
Clarence
Party	Candidate	Votes	%	±%
Alliance	J. Whale	1,180	43.6	–4.3
Conservative	M. Hicks	1,139	42.1	+6.3
Labour	S. Seelig	387	14.3	–2.0
Majority		41	1.5	–10.6
Turnout		2,706	61.5	+9.5
Registered electors		4,400		
Alliance gain from Conservative		Swing	▼5.3	

=== Cunningham ===
Cunningham
Party	Candidate	Votes	%	±%
Alliance	D. Hammerson	1,157	47.3	+0.4
Conservative	C. Ellis	915	37.4	+4.4
Labour	T. Jones	375	15.3	–4.8
Majority		242	9.9	–4.1
Turnout		2,447	51.2	+4.2
Registered electors		4,777		
Alliance hold		Swing	▼2.0	

=== Harpenden East ===
Harpenden East
Party	Candidate	Votes	%	±%
Conservative	M. Morrell	1,610	50.6	+8.9
Alliance	L. Johnstone	1,299	40.8	–3.3
Labour	D. Crew	275	8.6	–1.2
Majority		311	9.8	N/A
Turnout		3,184	62.4	+5.4
Registered electors		5,100		
Conservative hold		Swing	▲6.1	

No Green candidate as previous (4.4%).

=== Harpenden North ===
Harpenden North
Party	Candidate	Votes	%	±%
Conservative	C. Curl*	1,721	54.3	+7.3
Alliance	D. Wright	1,194	37.7	+1.4
Labour	B. Saffery	252	8.0	–2.8
Majority		527	16.6	+5.9
Turnout		3,167	53.7	+2.7
Registered electors		5,896		
Conservative hold		Swing	▲3.0	

No Green candidate as previous (5.9%).

=== Harpenden South ===
Harpenden South
Party	Candidate	Votes	%	±%
Conservative	G. Beedie	1,718	62.7	+6.0
Alliance	B. Webb	853	31.1	–3.5
Labour	J. Bailey	170	6.2	–2.5
Majority		865	31.6	+9.4
Turnout		2,741	53.4	+4.4
Registered electors		5,132		
Conservative hold		Swing	▲4.8	

=== Harpenden West ===
Harpenden West
Party	Candidate	Votes	%	±%
Conservative	D. Coe	1,696	60.4	+5.6
Alliance	D. Groom	958	34.1	–2.7
Labour	J. O'Brien	156	5.6	–2.8
Majority		738	26.3	+8.3
Turnout		2,810	53.5	+2.5
Registered electors		5,257		
Conservative hold		Swing	▲4.2	

=== London Colney ===
London Colney
Party	Candidate	Votes	%	±%
Conservative	K. Hoplin	1,003	40.5	+11.9
Labour	E. Gordon	996	40.2	–1.7
Alliance	T. Stainton	478	19.3	N/A
Majority		7	0.3	N/A
Turnout		2,477	44.4	+1.4
Registered electors		5,573		
Conservative gain from Labour		Swing	▲6.8	

No Independent Labour (22.8%) or Independent (6.6%) candidates as previous.

=== Marshallwick North ===
Marshallwick North
Party	Candidate	Votes	%	±%
Conservative	A. Hill	1,387	47.5	+6.9
Alliance	B. Gibson	1,302	44.6	–4.9
Labour	J. McPheat	228	7.8	–2.1
Majority		85	2.9	N/A
Turnout		2,917	57.5	+4.5
Registered electors		5,070		
Conservative hold		Swing	▲5.9	

=== Marshallwick South ===
Marshallwick South
Party	Candidate	Votes	%	±%
Conservative	O. Jennings*	1,574	48.3	+4.1
Alliance	S. Ward	1,377	42.2	–2.2
Labour	D. Allan	311	9.5	–1.9
Majority		197	6.0	N/A
Turnout		3,262	62.4	+6.4
Registered electors		5,225		
Conservative hold		Swing	▲3.2	

=== Park Street ===
Park Street
Party	Candidate	Votes	%	±%
Alliance	M. Cummins*	999	48.4	–3.5
Conservative	B. McArdie	863	41.9	+9.6
Labour	P. Robinson	200	9.7	–6.1
Majority		136	6.6	–13.1
Turnout		2,062	47.4	+5.4
Registered electors		4,350		
Alliance hold		Swing	▼6.6	

=== Redbourn ===
Redbourn
Party	Candidate	Votes	%	±%
Conservative	B. Chapman	1,270	50.3	+3.4
Alliance	P. Schofield	970	38.4	+5.0
Labour	G. Harris	286	11.3	–8.4
Majority		300	11.9	–1.6
Turnout		2,526	56.1	+5.1
Registered electors		4,501		
Conservative hold		Swing	▼0.8	

=== Sandridge ===
Sandridge
Party	Candidate	Votes	%	±%
Conservative	C. Whiteside	991	53.3	+19.9
Alliance	C. Oxley	590	31.7	N/A
Independent	C. Bracey	115	6.2	N/A
Labour	E. Adams	108	5.8	–1.5
Green	E. Field	56	3.0	N/A
Majority		401	21.6	N/A
Turnout		1,860	51.4	–2.9
Registered electors		3,622		
Conservative gain from Independent		Swing	N/A	

No Independent candidate as previous (59.4%).

=== Sopwell ===
Sopwell
Party	Candidate	Votes	%	±%
Labour	J. Gipps	1,041	40.1	–8.0
Alliance	M. Saunders	990	38.2	+7.9
Conservative	T. Wakerley	483	18.6	–3.1
Green	D. Southgate	79	3.0	N/A
Majority		51	2.0	–15.8
Turnout		2,593	54.0	+3.0
Registered electors		4,802		
Labour hold		Swing	▼8.0	

=== St. Peters ===
St. Peters
Party	Candidate	Votes	%	±%
Alliance	J. Gunner	1,136	45.4	–1.0
Conservative	T. Deamer	736	29.4	+4.9
Labour	G. Powell	628	25.1	–4.1
Majority		400	16.0	–1.2
Turnout		2,500	55.2	+5.2
Registered electors		4,528		
Alliance hold		Swing	▼3.0	

=== St. Stephens ===
St. Stephens
Party	Candidate	Votes	%	±%
Conservative	A. Nowell*	1,632	49.3	+14.2
Alliance	M. Moore	1,347	40.7	+14.6
Labour	M. Morcom	334	10.1	–0.8
Majority		285	8.6	+1.4
Turnout		3,313	57.9	+3.9
Registered electors		5,717		
Conservative hold		Swing	▼0.2	

No Independent candidate as previous (27.9%).

=== Verulam ===
Verulam
Party	Candidate	Votes	%	±%
Conservative	K. Davies*	1,757	54.1	+5.0
Alliance	C. White	1,282	39.5	+0.8
Labour	J. Bellchambers	208	6.4	–4.4
Majority		475	14.6	+4.2
Turnout		3,247	62.1	+7.1
Registered electors		5,226		
Conservative hold		Swing	▲2.1	

No Independent candidate as previous (1.3%).

=== Wheathampstead ===
Wheathampstead
Party	Candidate	Votes	%	±%
Conservative	F. Summerlin	1,300	45.5	+5.2
Alliance	I. Gledhill	1,235	43.3	–8.7
Labour	K. Spooner	204	7.1	–0.6
Green	J. Bishop	116	4.1	N/A
Majority		65	2.3	N/A
Turnout		2,855	58.6	+4.6
Registered electors		4,869		
Conservative hold		Swing	▲7.0	
