= 1987 Dacorum Borough Council election =

1987 UK local government election

1987 Dacourm Borough Council election
- 7 May 1987

All 58 seats to Dacorum Borough Council 30 seats needed for a majority

	First party	Second party
Party	Conservative	Alliance
Seats won	40	10
Seat change	▲4	▲7
Popular vote	52,183	38,249
Percentage	43.7%	32.0%
Swing	▲2.6%	▲8.6%
	Third party	Fourth party
Party	Labour	Independent
Seats won	8	0
Seat change	▼9	▼2
Popular vote	29,077	did not stand
Percentage	24.3%	did not stand
Swing	▼8.7%	▼2.2%
- Winner of each seat at the 1987 Dacorum Borough Council election.
Control before election
Conservative
Control after election
Conservative

The 1987 Dacorum Borough Council election took place on 7 May 1987 to elect members of Dacorum Borough Council in Hertfordshire, England. This was on the same day as other local elections.

== Summary ==
=== Election result ===
1987 Dacorum Borough Council election
Party	Candidates	Seats	Gains	Losses	Net gain/loss	Seats %	Votes %	Votes	+/−
Conservative	58	40	4	0	▲4	69.0	43.7	52,183	+2.6
Alliance	57	10	7	0	▲7	17.2	32.0	38,249	+8.6
Labour	58	8	0	9	▼9	13.8	24.3	29,077	–8.7
Independent	0	0	0	2	▼2	0.0	N/A	0	–2.2

== Ward results ==
Incumbent councillors standing for re-election are marked with an asterisk (*). Changes in seats do not take into account by-elections or defections.

=== Adeyfield East ===
Adeyfield East (2 seats)
Party	Candidate	Votes	%	±%
Conservative	A. Britton	864	39.7	+5.4
Conservative	L. Pursey	804	37.0	+4.6
Labour	G. Scribbens*	642	29.5	–12.3
Alliance	D. Coburn	640	29.4	+12.2
Labour	I. Laidlaw-Jackson*	627	28.8	–12.2
Alliance	M. Wentworth	594	27.3	N/A
Turnout		~2,174	56.2	+7.0
Registered electors		3,869		
Conservative gain from Labour				
Conservative gain from Labour				

=== Adeyfield West ===
Adeyfield West (3 seats)
Party	Candidate	Votes	%	±%
Labour	L. Taber*	1,029	40.7	–10.3
Labour	L. Breslin*	964	38.1	–7.3
Labour	M. Young*	908	35.9	–8.9
Conservative	P. Beale	764	30.2	+2.1
Conservative	C. Cribbens	758	30.0	+2.2
Conservative	S. Parker	740	29.3	+1.6
Alliance	C. Robinson	678	26.8	+5.1
Alliance	R. Duckworth	668	26.4	+5.1
Alliance	P. Tottman	652	25.8	N/A
Turnout		~2,527	57.8	+5.3
Registered electors		4,372		
Labour hold				
Labour hold				
Labour hold				

=== Aldbury & Wigginton ===
Aldbury & Wigginton
Party	Candidate	Votes	%	±%
Conservative	A. Whitehead*	639	62.8	–13.0
Alliance	R. Hollinghurst	277	27.2	N/A
Labour	R. Lovelace	102	10.0	–14.2
Majority		362	35.6	–16.0
Turnout		1,018	54.7	+6.9
Registered electors		1,859		
Conservative hold				

=== Ashridge ===
Ashridge (2 seats)
Party	Candidate	Votes	%	±%
Conservative	F. Seely*	1,078	67.3	+4.3
Conservative	J. Massey*	1,040	64.9	+2.1
Alliance	J. Lucey	345	21.5	–0.6
Alliance	J. Davis	332	20.7	–1.0
Labour	T. Mothersole	146	9.1	+1.1
Labour	K. Short	140	8.7	+1.3
Turnout		~1,602	58.4	–0.1
Registered electors		2,744		
Conservative hold				
Conservative hold				

=== Bennetts End ===
Bennetts End (3 seats)
Party	Candidate	Votes	%	±%
Labour	L. Morris*	962	43.0	–7.5
Labour	R. Haverson*	961	43.0	–2.7
Labour	A. Maclaughlin	931	41.6	–3.8
Conservative	K. Bennetts	687	30.7	+5.8
Conservative	J. Stanton	651	29.1	+4.8
Conservative	R. Stanton	646	28.9	+5.0
Alliance	G. Allen	480	21.5	+0.5
Alliance	J. Blackman	472	21.1	+0.5
Alliance	C. Edwards	449	20.1	–0.5
Turnout		~2,237	50.6	–1.2
Registered electors		4,420		
Labour hold				
Labour hold				
Labour hold				

=== Berkhamsted Central ===
Berkhamsted Central (2 seats)
Party	Candidate	Votes	%	±%
Conservative	O. Dunbavand	1,050	55.9	–1.0
Conservative	K. Coleman*	1,020	54.3	–2.2
Alliance	V. Earl	648	34.5	+5.6
Alliance	A. Horton	533	28.4	+0.3
Labour	A. Whitaker	199	10.6	+1.5
Labour	G. Bellamy	183	9.7	+2.1
Turnout		~1,878	50.0	–1.8
Registered electors		3,756		
Conservative hold				
Conservative hold				

=== Berkhamsted East ===
Berkhamsted East (3 seats)
Party	Candidate	Votes	%	±%
Conservative	W. Lees*	1,159	49.8	–0.9
Conservative	R. Peake*	1,083	46.5	–2.4
Conservative	P. Ginger	1,011	43.4	–2.1
Alliance	C. Olney	757	32.5	+9.7
Alliance	I. McCalla	690	29.6	+8.3
Alliance	G. Stevens	679	29.2	+9.0
Labour	D. Freeman	364	15.6	–3.5
Labour	H. Richardson	359	15.4	–3.2
Labour	D. Moss	337	14.5	–3.0
Turnout		~2,328	48.7	+0.8
Registered electors		4,780		
Conservative hold				
Conservative hold				
Conservative hold				

=== Berkhamsted West ===
Berkhamsted West (2 seats)
Party	Candidate	Votes	%	±%
Conservative	J. Carter*	871	49.8	+2.4
Conservative	F. Harran	854	48.8	+1.5
Alliance	R. Winter	581	33.2	+12.0
Labour	S. Bayliss	533	30.5	+6.5
Labour	R. Houlton	403	23.0	–0.4
Turnout		~1,749	51.9	–2.1
Registered electors		3,369		
Conservative hold				
Conservative hold				

=== Bovingdon & Flaunden ===
Bovingdon & Flaunden (2 seats)
Party	Candidate	Votes	%	±%
Conservative	P. Mayo*	1,053	54.5	+3.2
Conservative	A. Janes*	953	49.3	–1.2
Alliance	M. West	707	36.6	+16.2
Alliance	J. Bell	688	35.6	N/A
Labour	B. Attard	197	10.2	±0.0
Labour	R. Pearce	170	8.8	–1.2
Turnout		~1,931	54.3	–1.2
Registered electors		3,557		
Conservative hold				
Conservative hold				

=== Boxmoor ===
Boxmoor (3 seats)
Party	Candidate	Votes	%	±%
Conservative	J. Buteux*	1,297	45.5	–7.1
Conservative	A. Barling*	1,253	43.9	–8.7
Conservative	J. Marshall	1,237	43.4	–7.1
Alliance	M. Snoxall	906	31.8	+9.8
Alliance	S. Bowles	857	30.0	+8.9
Alliance	S. Frost	831	29.1	N/A
Labour	W. Pledger	579	20.3	–2.4
Labour	J. Coleman	559	19.6	–3.0
Labour	R. Pope	544	19.1	–1.0
Turnout		~2,852	57.7	–0.6
Registered electors		4,943		
Conservative hold				
Conservative hold				
Conservative hold				

=== Central ===
Central (2 seats)
Party	Candidate	Votes	%	±%
Conservative	C. Appleby*	878	42.1	–4.8
Conservative	A. Williams	847	40.6	–4.4
Alliance	A. Winter	805	38.6	+17.7
Alliance	W. Lear	744	35.6	+16.5
Labour	M. Coxage	453	21.7	–4.3
Labour	E. Clatter	447	21.4	–4.2
Turnout		~1,827	55.5	+7.3
Registered electors		3,291		
Conservative hold				
Conservative hold				

=== Chaulden ===
Chaulden
Party	Candidate	Votes	%	±%
Labour	P. Doran*	588	48.4	–2.9
Conservative	G. Hanson	392	32.3	+3.3
Alliance	D. Rance	235	19.3	–0.4
Majority		196	16.1	–6.2
Turnout		1,215	60.0	–0.2
Registered electors		2,024		
Labour hold		Swing	▼3.1	

=== Chipperfield ===
Chipperfield (1 seat)
Party	Candidate	Votes	%	±%
Conservative	J. Nichols*	464	54.5	–26.1
Alliance	L. Garratt	206	24.2	N/A
Labour	S. Cox	181	21.3	+1.9
Majority		258	30.3	–30.9
Turnout		851	61.0	+8.8
Registered electors		1,396		
Conservative hold				

=== Crabtree ===
Crabtree (3 seats)
Party	Candidate	Votes	%	±%
Conservative	J. Byfield*	1,144	40.0	–3.0
Conservative	T. Eastman*	1,107	38.7	–4.2
Conservative	M. Griffiths	1,083	37.9	–3.4
Labour	G. Cook	848	29.7	–2.0
Labour	S. Harrison	804	28.1	–2.5
Alliance	C. Sivers	802	28.1	+6.7
Alliance	L. Hepworth	797	27.9	+8.4
Labour	P. Ryan	796	27.9	–2.7
Alliance	R. Willson	776	27.2	+8.6
Turnout		~2,858	57.0	+5.1
Registered electors		5,014		
Conservative hold				
Conservative hold				
Conservative hold				

=== Cupid Green ===
Cupid Green (2 seats)
Party	Candidate	Votes	%	±%
Conservative	M. Griffiths	1,032	45.7	–5.7
Conservative	D. Samuels*	957	42.4	–4.2
Alliance	P. Gaddes	741	32.8	+13.5
Alliance	J. Payne	704	31.2	+13.7
Labour	R. Lawley	409	18.1	–9.1
Labour	R. Payne	389	17.2	–8.7
Turnout		~2,256	46.3	+4.3
Registered electors		4,873		
Conservative hold				
Conservative hold				

=== Flamstead & Markyate ===
Flamstead & Markyate (2 seats)
Party	Candidate	Votes	%	±%
Conservative	J. Taunton*	969	60.1	–2.7
Conservative	R. Kent*	927	57.5	–3.0
Labour	R. Macdonald	364	22.6	+7.3
Labour	R. Macdonald	333	20.7	+7.4
Alliance	J. Green	248	15.4	–7.4
Alliance	S. Wilson	235	14.6	N/A
Turnout		~1,611	48.7	+2.8
Registered electors		3,308		
Conservative hold				
Conservative hold				

=== Gadebridge ===
Gadebridge (2 seats)
Party	Candidate	Votes	%	±%
Alliance	T. Boreham	957	44.2	+6.7
Alliance	P. Brooks	859	39.7	+9.9
Labour	G. Mitchell	727	33.6	–8.8
Labour	P. Hinson	646	29.9	–8.3
Conservative	B. Griffiths	505	23.3	+5.3
Conservative	J. Mole	459	21.2	+3.6
Turnout		~2,164	60.1	+6.3
Registered electors		3,600		
Alliance gain from Labour				
Alliance gain from Labour				

=== Grove Hill ===
Grove Hill (3 seats)
Party	Candidate	Votes	%	±%
Alliance	N. Hollinghurst*	1,123	43.7	+7.5
Alliance	J. Blackman*	1,104	42.9	+10.4
Alliance	J. Gaddes	1,043	40.5	+9.0
Conservative	S. Byfield	746	29.0	–1.7
Conservative	K. Williams	736	28.6	–0.5
Conservative	J. Rajotte	692	26.9	–2.1
Labour	A. Fisher	636	24.7	–3.9
Labour	T. Smith	577	22.4	–4.4
Labour	N. Tavener	566	22.0	–4.5
Turnout		~2,572	45.0	–5.1
Registered electors		5,716		
Alliance hold				
Alliance hold				
Alliance hold				

=== Highfield ===
Highfield (3 seats)
Party	Candidate	Votes	%	±%
Alliance	G. Lawrence	956	40.8	+20.1
Labour	P. Doyle*	848	36.2	–15.7
Alliance	M. Ward	817	34.9	+14.7
Alliance	A. King	814	34.7	+15.3
Labour	M. Fitt	672	28.7	–17.5
Labour	M. O'Shea*	653	27.9	–16.4
Conservative	E. Davisson	572	24.4	+0.9
Conservative	C. Gough	555	23.7	+1.9
Conservative	N. Halsey	521	22.2	+0.5
Turnout		~2,343	54.6	+6.6
Registered electors		4,292		
Alliance gain from Labour				
Labour hold				
Alliance gain from Labour				

=== Kings Langley ===
Kings Langley (2 seats)
Party	Candidate	Votes	%	±%
Conservative	J. Greene	1,100	51.6	–19.0
Conservative	D. Walker	1,031	48.4	–14.2
Alliance	R. Kelly	729	34.2	N/A
Alliance	M. Matthews	729	34.2	N/A
Labour	A. Gale	304	14.3	–13.1
Labour	P. Guest	296	13.9	–8.2
Turnout		~2,131	59.0	+12.1
Registered electors		3,674		
Conservative hold				
Conservative hold				

=== Leverstock Green ===
Leverstock Green (3 seats)
Party	Candidate	Votes	%	±%
Conservative	H. Bassadone*	1,525	51.0	–4.3
Conservative	J. Hanson*	1,428	47.8	–7.2
Conservative	C. Cadman	1,396	46.7	–5.7
Alliance	C. Baker	939	31.4	+8.3
Alliance	J. Johnson	919	30.8	N/A
Alliance	A. Cawkwell	889	29.8	N/A
Labour	R. Garland	499	16.7	–8.6
Labour	E. Cushion	491	16.4	–8.5
Labour	V. Whitlock	478	16.0	–7.6
Turnout		~2,987	55.2	+2.0
Registered electors		5,412		
Conservative hold				
Conservative hold				
Conservative hold				

=== Nash Mills ===
Nash Mills
Party	Candidate	Votes	%	±%
Conservative	H. Korman	519	47.6	+4.1
Labour	R. Taylor	391	35.8	–10.5
Alliance	V. Dawson	181	16.6	+6.4
Majority		128	11.8	N/A
Turnout		1,091	64.2	+7.3
Registered electors		1,700		
Conservative gain from Labour		Swing	▲7.3	

=== Northchurch ===
Northchurch
Party	Candidate	Votes	%	±%
Conservative	G. Scott*	694	70.5	+6.8
Alliance	B. Patterson	214	21.7	–4.7
Labour	H. Bellion	76	7.7	–2.2
Majority		480	48.8	+11.5
Turnout		984	49.9	+2.6
Registered electors		1,987		
Conservative hold				

=== South ===
South
Party	Candidate	Votes	%	±%
Conservative	P. Benton*	919	58.9	+3.9
Alliance	L. Roe	442	28.3	+1.0
Labour	V. Carrington	200	12.8	–4.9
Majority		477	30.6	+2.9
Turnout		1,561	52.1	+1.8
Registered electors		3,000		
Conservative hold				

=== Tring Central ===
Tring Central (2 seats)
Party	Candidate	Votes	%	±%
Conservative	H. Valentine	1,034	46.3	+8.4
Conservative	K. Fenner	997	44.7	+10.0
Alliance	E. Williams	859	38.5	+11.8
Alliance	E. Glasser	824	36.9	N/A
Labour	S. Allcock	327	14.7	–6.4
Labour	C. Cohen	281	12.6	–8.1
Turnout		~2,231	53.9	+4.5
Registered electors		4,140		
Conservative gain from Independent				
Conservative hold				

=== Tring East ===
Tring East
Party	Candidate	Votes	%	±%
Conservative	J. Jamieson	717	60.6	–6.6
Alliance	M. Mitchell	399	33.7	+8.3
Labour	P. Carter	68	5.7	–1.7
Majority		318	26.9	–14.9
Turnout		1,184	66.8	+15.1
Registered electors		1,773		
Conservative hold		Swing	▼7.5	

=== Tring West ===
Tring West (2 seats)
Party	Candidate	Votes	%	±%
Conservative	D. Townsend*	1,239	57.8	–1.5
Conservative	M. Arnold	1,076	50.2	+15.1
Alliance	M. Campbell	609	28.4	+6.1
Alliance	B. Joyce	498	23.2	N/A
Labour	J. Dymond	359	16.7	–2.0
Labour	G. Lynch	287	13.4	–3.0
Turnout		~2,143	58.5	+11.1
Registered electors		3,664		
Conservative hold				
Conservative gain from Independent				

=== Warners End ===
Warners End (3 seats)
Party	Candidate	Votes	%	±%
Alliance	J. Sweetingham	884	34.6	+11.9
Alliance	E. Willis	875	34.3	+12.1
Alliance	A. Kelly	829	32.5	+10.7
Conservative	E. Thornton	826	32.3	+7.2
Conservative	L. Hughes	815	31.9	+7.7
Conservative	K. Reid	769	30.1	+6.3
Labour	S. Blofeld	769	30.1	–17.2
Labour	A. Dennison	749	29.3	–15.5
Labour	D. Jones	726	28.4	–15.1
Turnout		~2,553	57.9	+8.3
Registered electors		4,410		
Alliance gain from Labour				
Alliance gain from Labour				
Alliance gain from Labour				
