= 1987 Rochford District Council election =

1987 English local election

- 7 May 1987

12 out of 40 seats to Rochford District Council 21 seats needed for a majority

	First party	Second party
Party	Conservative	Alliance
Seats won	8	3
Seats after	23	10
Seat change	Steady	▼1
Popular vote	7,709	6,799
Percentage	45.5%	40.2%
Swing	▲6.3%	▲3.2%
	Third party	Fourth party
Party	Labour	Independent
Seats won	1	0
Seats after	6	1
Seat change	▲1	Steady
Popular vote	2,120	300
Percentage	12.5%	1.8%
Swing	▼8.0%	▼1.2%
Council control before election
Conservative
Council control after election
Conservative

The 1987 Rochford District Council election took place on 7 May 1987 to elect members of Rochford District Council in Essex, England. This was on the same day as other local elections.

== Summary ==
=== Election result ===
1987 Rochford District Council election
Party	This election			Full council			This election		
Party	Seats	Net	Seats %	Other	Total	Total %	Votes	Votes %	+/−
Conservative	8	Steady	66.7	15	23	57.5	7,709	45.5	+6.3
Alliance	3	▼1	25.0	7	10	25.0	6,799	40.2	+3.2
Labour	1	▲1	8.3	5	6	15.0	2,120	12.5	–8.0
Independent	0	Steady	0.0	1	1	2.5	300	1.8	–1.2

== Ward results ==
Incumbent councillors standing for re-election are marked with an asterisk (*). Changes in seats do not take into account by-elections or defections.

=== Ashingdon ===
Ashingdon
Party	Candidate	Votes	%	±%
Alliance	B. Crick*	694	56.0	+10.1
Conservative	J. Nicholls	442	35.6	–18.5
Labour	J. Ellis	104	8.4	N/A
Majority		252	20.3	N/A
Turnout		1,240	52.1	+10.0
Registered electors		2,381		
Alliance hold		Swing	▲14.3	

=== Barling & Sutton ===
Barling & Sutton
Party	Candidate	Votes	%	±%
Conservative	R. Allen	369	52.9	+2.4
Alliance	K. Nokes	234	33.6	–15.9
Labour	C. Coyte	94	13.5	N/A
Majority		135	19.4	+18.4
Turnout		697	55.0	+5.7
Registered electors		1,268		
Conservative hold		Swing	▲9.2	

=== Canewdon ===
Canewdon
Party	Candidate	Votes	%	±%
Conservative	D. Wood*	424	43.2	–24.6
Alliance	T. Powell	371	37.8	N/A
Independent	E. Gladstone	134	13.7	N/A
Labour	J. Christie	52	5.3	–26.9
Majority		53	5.4	–30.2
Turnout		981	58.3	+15.8
Registered electors		1,682		
Conservative hold				

=== Foulness & Great Wakering East ===
Foulness & Great Wakering East
Party	Candidate	Votes	%	±%
Conservative	R. Pearson*	544	61.9	+2.3
Alliance	S. Finch	169	19.2	N/A
Labour	S. Bull	166	18.9	N/A
Majority		375	42.7	+23.5
Turnout		879	51.0	+5.3
Registered electors		1,722		
Conservative hold				

=== Grange & Rawreth ===
Grange & Rawreth
Party	Candidate	Votes	%	±%
Alliance	P. Godsell	874	43.9	–1.0
Conservative	N. Hill	671	33.7	+2.3
Labour	R. McCamley	444	22.3	–1.4
Majority		203	10.2	–3.3
Turnout		1,989	44.1	+8.9
Registered electors		4,507		
Alliance gain from Conservative		Swing	▼1.7	

=== Great Wakering Central ===
Great Wakering Central
Party	Candidate	Votes	%	±%
Labour	D. Stow	388	49.4	N/A
Conservative	E. Easlea	304	38.7	–8.3
Alliance	J. Alabaster	93	11.8	–41.2
Majority		84	10.7	N/A
Turnout		785	58.8	+11.9
Registered electors		1,335		
Labour gain from Alliance				

=== Hawkwell East ===
Hawkwell East
Party	Candidate	Votes	%	±%
Conservative	A. Harvey*	1,218	53.7	+5.2
Alliance	H. Glynn	806	35.6	+7.5
Labour	S. Leftley	243	10.7	–12.7
Majority		412	18.2	–2.2
Turnout		2,267	42.8	+9.8
Registered electors		5,298		
Conservative hold		Swing	▼1.2	

=== Hawkwell West ===
Hawkwell West
Party	Candidate	Votes	%	±%
Conservative	J. Fawell*	711	50.7	+0.7
Alliance	J. Haslam	537	38.3	+8.3
Labour	G. Plackett	153	10.9	–9.1
Majority		174	12.4	–7.6
Turnout		1,401	44.8	+10.2
Registered electors		3,125		
Conservative hold		Swing	▼3.8	

=== Lodge ===
Lodge
Party	Candidate	Votes	%	±%
Conservative	P. Cooke*	1,124	48.7	+8.2
Alliance	S. Jarvis	1,010	43.7	–5.4
Labour	J. Stracey	175	7.6	–2.8
Majority		114	4.9	N/A
Turnout		2,309	48.6	+8.5
Registered electors		4,752		
Conservative hold		Swing	▲6.8	

=== Trinity ===
Trinity
Party	Candidate	Votes	%	±%
Alliance	D. Helson*	863	56.7	–14.9
Conservative	D. Fowler	573	37.6	+9.2
Labour	V. Arnold	87	5.7	N/A
Majority		290	19.0	–24.3
Turnout		1,523	51.6	+6.0
Registered electors		2,951		
Alliance hold		Swing	▼12.1	

=== Wheatley ===
Wheatley
Party	Candidate	Votes	%	±%
Conservative	P. Webster	650	49.4	+1.5
Alliance	T. Dean*	574	43.6	+0.7
Labour	S. Cox	93	7.1	–2.2
Majority		76	5.8	+0.8
Turnout		1,317	52.8	+7.3
Registered electors		2,496		
Conservative gain from Alliance		Swing	▲0.4	

=== Whitehouse ===
Whitehouse
Party	Candidate	Votes	%	±%
Conservative	J. Gibson*	679	44.1	+3.3
Alliance	N. Harris	574	37.3	–21.9
Independent	J. Bolton	166	10.8	N/A
Labour	J. Foley	121	7.9	N/A
Majority		105	6.8	
Turnout		1,540	56.9	+10.6
Registered electors		2,705		
Conservative hold		Swing	▲12.6	
