= 1987 Waveney District Council election =

1987 English local government election

- 7 May 1987

All 48 seats to Waveney District Council 25 seats needed for a majority

	First party	Second party
Party	Conservative	Labour
Seats won	8	7
Seats after	22	21
Seat change	▼1	Steady
Popular vote	12,991	10,607
Percentage	38.4%	31.3%
Swing	▲4.6%	▼6.0%
	Third party	Fourth party
Party	Alliance	Independent
Seats won	1	0
Seats after	4	1
Seat change	▲1	Steady
Popular vote	9,831	410
Percentage	29.1%	1.2%
Swing	▲3.8%	▼1.7%
- Winner of each seat at the 1987 Waveney District Council election.
Control before election
No overall control
Control after election
No overall control

The 1987 Waveney District Council election took place on 7 May 1987 to elect members of Waveney District Council in Suffolk, England. This was on the same day as other local elections.

== Summary ==
=== Election result ===
1987 Waveney District Council election
Party	This election			Full council			This election		
Party	Seats	Net	Seats %	Other	Total	Total %	Votes	Votes %	+/−
Conservative	8	▼1	50.0	14	22	45.8	12,991	38.4	+4.6
Labour	7	Steady	43.8	14	21	43.8	10,607	31.3	–6.0
Alliance	1	▲1	6.3	3	4	8.3	9,831	29.1	+3.8
Independent	0	Steady	0.0	1	1	2.1	410	1.2	–1.7

== Ward results ==
Incumbent councillors standing for re-election are marked with an asterisk (*). Changes in seats do not take into account by-elections or defections.

=== Beccles Town ===
Beccles Town
Party	Candidate	Votes	%	±%
Alliance	E. Crisp	1,242	46.8	
Conservative	C. Dow	910	34.3	
Labour	M. Rodgers	501	18.9	
Majority		332	12.5	
Turnout		2,653	49.0	
Registered electors		5,505		
Alliance gain from Conservative				

=== Beccles Worlingham ===
Beccles Worlingham
Party	Candidate	Votes	%	±%
Conservative	H. Durie	552	37.0	
Labour	C. Adam	510	34.2	
Alliance	G. West	429	28.8	
Majority		42	2.8	
Turnout		1,491	41.4	
Registered electors		3,625		
Conservative hold				

=== Blything ===
Blything
Party	Candidate	Votes	%	±%
Conservative	K. Currie*	431	42.5	
Independent	E. Woodard	410	40.4	
Alliance	J. Winyard	174	17.1	
Majority		21	2.1	
Turnout		1,015	59.5	
Registered electors		1,707		
Conservative hold				

=== Bungay ===
Bungay
Party	Candidate	Votes	%	±%
Conservative	J. Palin*	841	45.2	
Alliance	D. O'Neill	595	32.0	
Labour	R. Richards	426	22.9	
Majority		246	13.2	
Turnout		1,862	53.8	
Registered electors		3,583		
Conservative hold				

=== Carlton ===
Carlton
Party	Candidate	Votes	%	±%
Conservative	N. Brighouse	1,362	47.0	
Alliance	C. Shade	968	33.4	
Labour	T. Kelly	567	19.6	
Majority		394	13.6	
Turnout		2,897	47.5	
Registered electors		6,099		
Conservative hold				

=== Gunton ===
Gunton
Party	Candidate	Votes	%	±%
Conservative	L. Wright	1,251	46.5	
Alliance	A. Martin	917	34.1	
Labour	J. Spottiswoode	523	19.4	
Majority		334	12.4	
Turnout		2,691	51.0	
Registered electors		5,283		
Conservative hold				

=== Halesworth ===
Halesworth
Party	Candidate	Votes	%	±%
Conservative	R. Niblett*	755	44.4	
Labour	H. Holzer	685	40.3	
Alliance	C. Roberts	259	15.2	
Majority		70	4.1	
Turnout		1,699	50.2	
Registered electors		3,421		
Conservative hold				

=== Harbour ===
Harbour
Party	Candidate	Votes	%	±%
Labour	J. Ellerby	788	54.2	
Alliance	A. Shepherd	666	45.8	
Majority		122	8.4	
Turnout		1,454	35.9	
Registered electors		4,058		
Labour hold				

=== Kirkley ===
Kirkley
Party	Candidate	Votes	%	±%
Labour	T. Carter*	900	38.7	
Alliance	J. Van Pelt	893	38.4	
Conservative	L. Jeffery	532	22.9	
Majority		7	0.3	
Turnout		2,325	52.6	
Registered electors		4,422		
Labour hold				

=== Lothingland ===
Lothingland
Party	Candidate	Votes	%	±%
Conservative	A. Brown	992	48.3	
Labour	R. Jack	638	31.1	
Alliance	A. Moles	424	20.6	
Majority		354	17.2	
Turnout		2,054	48.6	
Registered electors		4,227		
Conservative hold				

=== Normanston ===
Normanston
Party	Candidate	Votes	%	±%
Labour	P. Hunt*	937	48.2	
Alliance	V. Caseley	525	27.0	
Conservative	H. Wallace	481	24.8	
Majority		412	21.2	
Turnout		1,943	41.9	
Registered electors		4,645		
Labour hold				

=== Oulton Broad ===
Oulton Broad
Party	Candidate	Votes	%	±%
Conservative	M. Barnard	1,220	51.2	
Labour	M. Ramsay	671	28.2	
Alliance	D. Tregloyne	490	20.6	
Majority		549	23.1	
Turnout		2,381	45.6	
Registered electors		5,233		
Conservative hold				

=== Pakefield ===
Pakefield
Party	Candidate	Votes	%	±%
Labour	Robert Blizzard	1,235	42.0	
Conservative	M. Reader	1,234	42.0	
Alliance	M. Cambridge	472	16.0	
Majority		1	0.0	
Turnout		2,941	51.0	
Registered electors		5,766		
Labour hold				

=== Southwold ===
Southwold
Party	Candidate	Votes	%	±%
Conservative	S. Simpson	1,392	59.7	
Alliance	R. Winyard	938	40.3	
Majority		454	19.5	
Turnout		2,330	46.2	
Registered electors		5,059		
Conservative hold				

=== St. Margarets ===
St. Margarets
Party	Candidate	Votes	%	±%
Labour	L. Owen	1,064	47.4	
Conservative	S. Rudd	642	28.6	
Alliance	W. Robertson	540	24.0	
Majority		422	18.8	
Turnout		2,246	41.6	
Registered electors		5,405		
Labour hold				

=== Whitton ===
Whitton
Party	Candidate	Votes	%	±%
Labour	T. Chipperfield*	1,162	62.6	
Conservative	W. Easton	396	21.3	
Alliance	C. Thomas	299	16.1	
Majority		766	41.2	
Turnout		1,857	41.9	
Registered electors		4,437		
Labour hold				

== By-elections ==
=== St. Margarets ===
St. Margarets by-election: 7 May 1987
Party	Candidate	Votes	%	±%
Conservative		1,460	50.8	
Labour		761	26.5	
Independent		652	22.7	
Majority		699	24.3	
Turnout		2,873	47.0	
Registered electors		6,113		
Conservative hold		Swing		
