= 1987 Welwyn Hatfield District Council election =

Welwyn Hatfield District Council election

- 7 May 1987

14 out of 43 seats to Welwyn Hatfield District Council 22 seats needed for a majority
- Turnout: ~40,035, 54.2%

	First party	Second party	Third party
Party	Labour	Conservative	Alliance
Last election	24 seats, 37.8%	19 seats, 36.0%	2 seats, 26.2%
Seats before	24	17	2
Seats after	23	18	2
Seat change	▼1	▲1	Steady
Popular vote	12,511	16,501	8,463
Percentage	33.4%	44.0%	22.6%
Swing	▼4.4	▲8.0	▼3.6

The 1987 Welwyn Hatfield District Council election took place on 7 May 1987 to elect members of Welwyn Hatfield District Council in England. This was on the same day as other local elections. A third of the seats were up for contest; one from each ward, plus an additional seat in Welwyn South to fill a casual vacancy. The Conservatives managed to gain a seat from Labour, although their share of the vote was not enough to seriously threat Labour's majority on the council.

== Summary ==
=== Election result ===
1987 Welwyn Hatfield District Council election
Party	This election			Full council			This election		
Party	Seats	Net	Seats %	Other	Total	Total %	Votes	Votes %	+/−
Labour	6	▼1	42.9	17	23	53.5	12,511	33.4	–4.4
Conservative	7	▲1	50.0	11	18	41.9	16,501	44.0	+8.0
Alliance	1	Steady	7.1	1	2	4.7	8,463	22.6	–3.6
