= 1987 Wolverhampton Metropolitan Borough Council election =

1987 UK local government election

The 1987 Council elections held in Wolverhampton on Thursday 7 May 1987 were one third, and 20 of the 60 seats were up for election.

During the 1987 election the Conservatives gained the Bilston North, Graiseley, Wednesfield North and Wednesfield South seats from Labour whilst the SDP–Liberal Alliance gained Heath Town, East Park and Spring Vale wards from Labour.

Prior to the election the constitution of the Council was:

- Labour 37
- Conservative 19
- Alliance 4

Following the election the constitution of the Council was:

- Labour 30
- Conservative 23
- Alliance 7

== Ward results ==
Bilston East
Party	Candidate	Votes	%	±%
Labour	J Geraghty	1421		
Conservative	R Green	804		
Alliance	Mrs A Whitehouse	558		
Independent	J Davies	301		
Majority		617		

Bilston North
Party	Candidate	Votes	%	±%
Conservative	Mrs C Mills	1977		
Labour	N Dougherty	1680		
Alliance	Mrs C Moores	792		
Majority		297		

Blakenhall
Party	Candidate	Votes	%	±%
Labour	R Reynolds	2246		
Conservative	P Lewis	1663		
Alliance	T Whitehouse	597		
Majority		583		

Bushbury
Party	Candidate	Votes	%	±%
Conservative	P Turley	2471		
Labour	T Barratt	1110		
Alliance	I Jenkins	945		
Majority		1361		

East Park
Party	Candidate	Votes	%	±%
Alliance	J Steatham	2078		
Labour	A Steventon	1313		
Conservative	Mrs B Mellor	670		
Majority		765		

Ettingshall
Party	Candidate	Votes	%	±%
Labour	P Richards	1654		
Conservative	Mrs J Shore	940		
Alliance	P McGloin	673		
Majority		714		

Fallings Park
Party	Candidate	Votes	%	±%
Conservative	B Findlay	2314		
Labour	J Ball	1274		
Alliance	Mrs A Langley	845		
Majority		1040		

Graiseley
Party	Candidate	Votes	%	±%
Conservative	J Mellor	2412		
Labour	Mrs M Chevannes	2096		
Alliance	Mrs I Nightingale	651		
Majority		316		

Heath Town
Party	Candidate	Votes	%	±%
Alliance	C Hallmark	1495		
Labour	B Dass	1339		
Conservative	Mrs M Hoare	721		
Majority		156		

Low Hill
Party	Candidate	Votes	%	±%
Labour	C Laws	1650		
Conservative	K Gliwitzki	1145		
Alliance	J Thompson	658		
Majority		505		

Merry Hill
Party	Candidate	Votes	%	±%
Conservative	R Hart	3134		
Alliance	J White	1065		
Labour	P Walker	874		
Majority		2069		

Oxley
Party	Candidate	Votes	%	±%
Conservative	N Patten	2018		
Labour	D McKittrick	1359		
Alliance	T Perkins	995		
Majority		659		

Park
Party	Candidate	Votes	%	±%
Conservative	Mrs M Hodson	3274		
Labour	R Thompson	1304		
Alliance	G Ellam	712		
Majority		1970		

Penn
Party	Candidate	Votes	%	±%
Conservative	Mrs P Bradley	3609		
Alliance	R Jones	1125		
Labour	F Docherty	597		
Majority		2484		

St Peter's
Party	Candidate	Votes	%	±%
Labour	R Lawrence	2776		
Conservative	R Ward	970		
Alliance	B Lewis	662		
Majority		1806		

Spring Vale
Party	Candidate	Votes	%	±%
Alliance	Mrs K Morgan	2458		
Labour	A Garner	1486		
Conservative	Mrs J Lenoir	896		
Majority		972		

Tettenhall Regis
Party	Candidate	Votes	%	±%
Conservative	J Davis	2579		
Alliance	J Wernick	2200		
Labour	L Turner	494		
Majority		379		

Tettenhall Wightwick
Party	Candidate	Votes	%	±%
Conservative	J Inglis	3436		
Alliance	Mrs C Jones-Williams	1114		
Majority		2322		

Wednesfield North
Party	Candidate	Votes	%	±%
Conservative	G Jones	2316		
Labour	J Woodward	1391		
Alliance	C Hodgkins	999		
Majority		925		

Wednesfield South
Party	Candidate	Votes	%	±%
Conservative	Mrs R Ball	1945		
Labour	R Harding	1491		
Alliance	Mrs J Lamb	890		
Majority		454		
