= 1987 Broxbourne Borough Council election =

1987 UK local government election

The Broxbourne Council election, 1987 was held to elect council members of the Broxbourne Borough Council, the local government authority of the borough of Broxbourne, Hertfordshire, England.

== Composition of expiring seats before election ==
Ward	Party	Incumbent Elected	Incumbent	Standing again?
Broxbourne	Conservative	1983	Joyce Ball	Yes
Bury Green	Conservative	1983	Michael Hanson	Yes
Cheshunt Central	Conservative	1985	Graham Brewster	Yes
Cheshunt North	Conservative	1983	Doris Moody	Yes
Flamstead End	Conservative	1983	James Swannell	Yes
Goffs Oak	Conservative	1983	Christina Rooke	Yes
Hoddesdon North	Conservative	1983	Gerald Walker	Yes (Note: Gerald Walker stood in Rye Park Ward in 1987.)
Hoddesdon Town	SDP-Liberal Alliance	1983	Robert Chilton	No
Rosedale	SDP-Liberal Alliance	1985	David Lefley	Yes
Rye Park	Conservative	1983	Edwin Luther	Yes (Note: Edwin Luther stood in Hoddesdon North Ward in 1987.)
Theobalds	Conservative	1983	Roy Chaplow	Yes
Waltham Cross North	Conservative	1983	David Willis	Yes
Waltham Cross South	Labour	1983	Daisy Cunningham	No
Wormley & Turnford	Conservative	1984	Beryle Poole	Yes

== Election results ==
Broxbourne local election result 1987
Party	Seats	Gains	Losses	Net gain/loss	Seats %	Votes %	Votes	+/−
Conservative	14	2	0	+2	93.33	58.22	15,963	
Labour	1	0	0	0	6.67	19.39	5,316	
Alliance	0	0	2	-2	0.00	22.39	6,141	

== Results summary ==
An election was held in 14 wards on 7 May 1987.

15 seats were contested (2 seats in Cheshunt Central Ward)

The Conservative Party made two gains at the expense of the SDP – Liberal Alliance with wins in Hoddesdon Town Ward and Rosedale Ward.

The political balance of the council following this election was:

- Conservative 34 seats
- Labour 6 seats
- SDP-Liberal Alliance 2 Seats

== Ward results ==
Broxbourne Ward Result 7 May 1987
Party	Candidate	Votes	%	±%
Conservative	Joyce Ball	1,609	66.24	
Alliance	Keith Smith	680	28.00	
Labour	Andrew White	140	5.76	
Majority		929		
Turnout		2,429	43.40	
Conservative hold		Swing		

Bury Green Ward Result 7 May 1987
Party	Candidate	Votes	%	±%
Conservative	Michael Hanson	1,387	51.93	
Labour	Paul Spychal	812	30.40	
Alliance	Kenneth King	472	17.67	
Majority		575		
Turnout		2,671	46.60	
Conservative hold		Swing		

Cheshunt Central Ward Result 7 May 1987
Party	Candidate	Votes	%	±%
Conservative	Graham Brewster	1,030	32.08	
Conservative	Milan Milovanovic	960	29.89	
Alliance	Peter Huse	407	12.68	
Alliance	Carolyn Arney	405	12.61	
Labour	Mark Bryant	220	6.85	
Labour	Joan Saggs	189	5.89	
Turnout		3,211	47.90	
Conservative hold		Swing		
Conservative hold		Swing		

Cheshunt North Ward Result 7 May 1987
Party	Candidate	Votes	%	±%
Conservative	Doris Moody	1,151	56.34	
Labour	Peter Alford	483	23.64	
Alliance	Martin Hills	409	20.02	
Majority		668		
Turnout		2,043	41.60	
Conservative hold		Swing		

Flamstead End Ward Result 7 May 1987
Party	Candidate	Votes	%	±%
Conservative	James Swannell	1,345	64.92	
Alliance	Terrence Glenister	453	21.86	
Labour	Gary Starkes	274	13.22	
Majority		892		
Turnout		2,072	43.40	
Conservative hold		Swing		

Goffs Oak Ward Result 7 May 1987
Party	Candidate	Votes	%	±%
Conservative	Christina Rooke	1,072	70.30	
Alliance	Trevor Griffiths	364	23.86	
Labour	Stephen Kingsmill	89	5.84	
Majority		708		
Turnout		1,525	44.10	
Conservative hold		Swing		

Hoddesdon North Ward Result 7 May 1987
Party	Candidate	Votes	%	±%
Conservative	Edwin Luther	1,444	65.16	
Alliance	Patricia Waughray	554	25.00	
Labour	Jill Garrett	218	9.84	
Majority		890		
Turnout		2,216	44.80	
Conservative hold		Swing		

Hoddesdon Town Ward Result 7 May 1987
Party	Candidate	Votes	%	±%
Conservative	Moyra O'Neill	1,139	53.98	
Alliance	Malcolm Aitken	712	33.75	
Labour	David May	259	12.27	
Majority		427		
Turnout		2,110	44.40	
Conservative gain from Alliance		Swing		

Rosedale Ward Result 7 May 1987
Party	Candidate	Votes	%	±%
Conservative	Paul Havis	553	50.27	
Alliance	David Lefley	341	31.00	
Labour	John Atkins	206	18.73	
Majority		213		
Turnout		1,100	42.30	
Conservative gain from Alliance		Swing		

Rye Park Ward Result 7 May 1987
Party	Candidate	Votes	%	±%
Conservative	Gerald Walker	993	47.88	
Labour	Neil Harvey	753	36.31	
Alliance	Michael Sherman	328	15.81	
Majority		240		
Turnout		2,074	44.30	
Conservative hold		Swing		

Theobalds Ward Result 7 May 1987
Party	Candidate	Votes	%	±%
Conservative	Roy Chaplow	967	58.61	
Alliance	John Doolan	360	21.82	
Labour	John Brown	323	19.57	
Majority		607		
Turnout		1,650	39.50	
Conservative hold		Swing		

Waltham Cross North Result 7 May 1987
Party	Candidate	Votes	%	±%
Conservative	David Willis	805	59.28	
Labour	Lester Hickling	278	20.47	
Alliance	Anthony Stokes	275	20.25	
Majority		527		
Turnout		1,358	42.20	
Conservative hold		Swing		

Waltham Cross South Ward Result 7 May 1987
Party	Candidate	Votes	%	±%
Labour	David Adams	567	38.49	
Conservative	George Clark	546	37.07	
Alliance	Walter Riley	360	24.44	
Majority		21		
Turnout		1,473	37.80	
Labour hold		Swing		

Wormley / Turnford Ward Result 7 May 1987
Party	Candidate	Votes	%	±%
Conservative	Beryl Poole	962	64.39	
Alliance	Lesley Dines	296	19.81	
Labour	Roy Wareham	236	15.80	
Majority		666		
Turnout		1,494	32.10	
Conservative hold		Swing		
