= 1987 South Kesteven District Council election =

1987 UK local government election

District council elections were held in South Kesteven in 1987.

== Results by ward ==
=== Deeping St James Ward ===
Deeping St. James Election May 1987 - Three seats
Party	Candidate	Votes	%	±%
Alliance	Kenneth Mercer Joynson	1,219		
Alliance	Jeremy Haywood	1,179		
Alliance	Edith Hewitt Wing	1,065		
Conservative	Raymond J. Isaacs	830		
Conservative	Joan M. Wilson	770		
Conservative	Harry K. Braid	759		

=== Market and West Deeping Ward ===
Market and West Deeping May 1987 - Three seats
Party	Candidate	Votes	%	±%
Alliance	Reginald L. Ducker	1,009		
Alliance	Hazel R Perry	949		
Alliance	Ray John Auger	911		
Conservative	Victor Herbert Bulmer Jones	568		
Conservative	Mitchell Hay	536		
Conservative	Terence Yates	495		
