= 1987 Cheltenham Borough Council election =

Cheltenham Borough Council election

The 1987 Cheltenham Council election took place on 7 May 1987 to elect members of Cheltenham Borough Council in Gloucestershire, England. One third of the council was up for election. The Conservatives made gains and became the largest party, but the council stayed in no overall control.

After the election, the composition of the council was:

- Conservative 15
- SDP–Liberal Alliance 14
- Labour 2
- Residents Associations 2

== Election result ==
Cheltenham local election result 1987
Party	Seats	Gains	Losses	Net gain/loss	Seats %	Votes %	Votes	+/−
Conservative	9	4	0	+4	81.8	44.2	14,968	+8.8
Alliance	2	1	3	-2	18.2	38.6	13,074	-1.8
Labour	0	0	0	-	0.0	11.5	3,903	-4.8
Residents	0	0	2	-2	0.0	5.7	1,913	+1.1

== Ward results ==
All Saints
Party	Candidate	Votes	%	±%
Conservative	Daphne Pennell	1,533	47.8	+7.1
Alliance	Andrew McKinlay	1,310	40.8	−6.7
Labour	Diana Hale	364	11.4	−4.1
Majority		223	7.0	
Turnout		3,207	46.99	
Conservative hold		Swing		

Charlton Kings
Party	Candidate	Votes	%	±%
Conservative	Jennifer Moreton	1,402	37.0	+11.9
Alliance	Rosemary Daffurn	1,314	34.7	−0.8
Residents	Walter Robinson	913	24.1	−15.3
Labour	Paul Booth	159	4.2	N/A
Majority		88	2.3	
Turnout		3,788	59.07	
Conservative gain from Residents		Swing		

College
Party	Candidate	Votes	%	±%
Conservative	Brian Chaplin	2,341	56.0	+5.0
Alliance	Garth Barnes	1,649	39.4	−3.0
Labour	Philip Jump	192	4.6	−1.9
Majority		692	16.6	
Turnout		4,182	59.59	
Conservative hold		Swing		

Hatherley
Party	Candidate	Votes	%	±%
Conservative	Jacqueline Thorp	1,637	49.3	+8.7
Alliance	Richard Pride	1,414	42.6	−11.8
Labour	Andrew Palmer	268	8.1	−3.9
Majority		223	6.7	
Turnout		3,319	50.33	
Conservative gain from Alliance		Swing		

Hesters Way
Party	Candidate	Votes	%	±%
Alliance	David Banyard	1,389	49.2	+13.2
Residents	Richard Sturdy*	1,000	35.4	N/A
Labour	Clive Harriss	434	15.4	−17.7
Majority		389	13.8	
Turnout		2,823	39.49	
Alliance gain from Residents		Swing		

Lansdown
Party	Candidate	Votes	%	±%
Conservative	Stephen Wickham	1,575	59.0	+3.1
Alliance	Roger Jones	834	31.2	−1.0
Labour	Linda Stapleton	260	9.7	−2.2
Majority		741	27.8	
Turnout		2,669	44.15	
Conservative hold		Swing		

Park
Party	Candidate	Votes	%	±%
Conservative	Charles Irving	1,972	59.7	+2.3
Alliance	Joyce Norman	1,179	35.7	+0.9
Labour	Maria Bottomley	150	4.5	−3.3
Majority		793	24.0	
Turnout		3,301	58.21	
Conservative hold		Swing		

Pittville
Party	Candidate	Votes	%	±%
Conservative	Charles Raymond	1,210	39.5	+5.7
Labour	Jonquil Naish	1,000	32.6	−8.3
Alliance	Alan Wadley	856	27.9	+2.6
Majority		210	6.9	
Turnout		3,066	49.44	
Conservative hold		Swing		

St Mark's
Party	Candidate	Votes	%	±%
Alliance	Brian Cassin*	1,270	54.8	+1.8
Conservative	Graham Daniel	682	29.4	+10.6
Labour	Sandra Thomas	367	15.8	−12.4
Majority		588	25.4	
Turnout		2,319	40.11	
Alliance hold		Swing		

St Paul's
Party	Candidate	Votes	%	±%
Conservative	Dudley Aldridge	1,282	48.4	+6.4
Alliance	Andrew Fayter	1,103	41.7	−3.9
Labour	Graham Mace	263	9.9	−2.5
Majority		179	6.7	
Turnout		2,648	46.06	
Conservative gain from Alliance		Swing		

St Peter's
Party	Candidate	Votes	%	±%
Conservative	Roy Marchant*	1,330	52.5	+19.2
Alliance	Philip Hart	756	29.9	−12.3
Labour	Phillip Chappell	446	17.6	−6.9
Majority		574	22.6	
Turnout		2,532	43.20	
Conservative hold		Swing		
