= 1987 Gloucester City Council election =

UK local election

The 1987 Gloucester City Council election took place on 3 May 1987 to elect members of Gloucester City Council in England.

== Results ==
Gloucester City Council election, 1987
| Party | Seats | Gains | Losses | Net gain/loss | Seats % | Votes % | Votes | +/− |
|---|---|---|---|---|---|---|---|---|
| Conservative | 17 | | | | 51.5 | | | |
| Labour | 10 | | | | 30.3 | | | |
| Alliance | 5 | | | | 15.2 | | | |
| Other | 1 | | | | 3.0 | | | |

== Ward results ==
=== Barnwood ===
Barnwood 1987
| Party | Candidate | Votes | % | ±% |
|---|---|---|---|---|
| Conservative | D.* Hartshorne | 2,662 | 56.4 | |
| Labour | A. Masters | 1,469 | 31.1 | |
| Alliance | J. Cole | 590 | 12.5 | |
| Turnout | | 4,721 | 53.7 | |
| Conservative hold | | Swing | | |

=== Barton ===
Barton 1987
| Party | Candidate | Votes | % | ±% |
|---|---|---|---|---|
| Conservative | C. Stevenson | 1,142 | 45.8 | |
| Labour | D.* Cosstick | 1,102 | 44.2 | |
| Alliance | L. Young | 248 | 10.0 | |
| Turnout | | 2,492 | 42.9 | |
| Conservative hold | | Swing | | |

=== Eastgate ===
Eastgate 1987
| Party | Candidate | Votes | % | ±% |
|---|---|---|---|---|
| Labour | A.* Ayland | 1,175 | 46.7 | |
| Conservative | J. Neary | 990 | 39.4 | |
| Alliance | J. Green | 349 | 13.9 | |
| Turnout | | 2,514 | 43.7 | |
| Labour hold | | Swing | | |

=== Hucclecote ===
Hucclecote
| Party | Candidate | Votes | % | ±% |
|---|---|---|---|---|
| Conservative | T.* Wathen | 1,845 | 51.4 | |
| Alliance | S. O'Connor | 1,270 | 35.4 | |
| Labour | M. Harriott | 474 | 13.2 | |
| Turnout | | 3,586 | 56.5 | |
| Conservative win (new seat) | | | | |

=== Kingsholm ===
Kingsholm 1987
| Party | Candidate | Votes | % | ±% |
|---|---|---|---|---|
| Conservative | E.* Ede | 1,762 | 47.3 | |
| Alliance | Ms. M. Gould | 1,470 | 39.5 | |
| Labour | M. Williams | 491 | 13.2 | |
| Turnout | | 3.723 | 58.8 | |
| Conservative hold | | Swing | | |

=== Linden ===
Linden 1987
| Party | Candidate | Votes | % | ±% |
|---|---|---|---|---|
| Conservative | G. Parrott | 1,333 | 47.4 | |
| Labour | D. James | 977 | 34.8 | |
| Alliance | A. Gribble | 500 | 17.8 | |
| Turnout | | 2,810 | 49.5 | |
| Conservative win (new seat) | | | | |

=== Longlevens ===
Longlevens 1987
| Party | Candidate | Votes | % | ±% |
|---|---|---|---|---|
| Conservative | N.* Partridge | 1,983 | 56.9 | |
| Labour | B. Richards | 839 | 24.1 | |
| Alliance | J. Goodwin | 662 | 19.0 | |
| Turnout | | 3,484 | 54.4 | |
| Conservative hold | | Swing | | |

=== Matson ===
Matson 1987
| Party | Candidate | Votes | % | ±% |
|---|---|---|---|---|
| Labour | K.* Stephens | 1,151 | 44.0 | |
| Conservative | L. Trigg | 1,117 | 42.7 | |
| Alliance | W. Cunningham-Smith | 349 | 13.3 | |
| Turnout | | 2,617 | 41.6 | |
| Labour hold | | Swing | | |

=== Podsmead ===
Podsmead 1987
| Party | Candidate | Votes | % | ±% |
|---|---|---|---|---|
| Alliance | Ms. E. Drinan | 1,366 | 43.4 | |
| Conservative | Ms. E. Orr | 1,109 | 35.3 | |
| Labour | M. McGinn | 670 | 21.3 | |
| Turnout | | 3,145 | 53.1 | |
| Alliance hold | | Swing | | |

=== Tuffley ===
Tuffley 1987
| Party | Candidate | Votes | % | ±% |
|---|---|---|---|---|
| Conservative | H. Blagden | 1,676 | 47.7 | |
| Labour | A. Meredith | 1,287 | 36.6 | |
| Alliance | D. Harris | 549 | 15.6 | |
| Turnout | | 3,512 | 56.4 | |
| Conservative gain from Labour | | Swing | | |

=== Westgate ===
Westgate 1987
| Party | Candidate | Votes | % | ±% |
|---|---|---|---|---|
| Conservative | L. Journeaux | 1,126 | 43.0 | |
| Alliance | P. Aplin | 1,085 | 41.5 | |
| Labour | R. Harriott | 405 | 15.5 | |
| Turnout | | 2616 | 50.0 | |
| Conservative hold | | Swing | | |
