= 1987 Guildford Borough Council election =

1987 UK local government election

The fifth full elections for Guildford Borough Council took place on 1 May 1987. The Conservatives retained control of the council winning 30 of the 45 seats on the council. This represented one net loss for the Conservatives, relative to the 1983 council elections. Labour retained its 6 councillors. The SDP-Liberal Alliance won 9 seats, a net gain of two seats on the 1983 council elections. No independents were elected to the council, one had been elected in 1983.

Three wards partly or wholly changed hands in the 1987 council elections relative to the 1983 council elections. The SDP-Liberal Alliance gained one councillor from the Conservatives in Stoughton and gained a further councillor from the Conservatives in Normandy.

The Conservatives gained one councillor in Tillingbourne from an independent.

In 1982, the Local Government Boundary Commission recommended the transfer of the southern part of Send parish to West Clandon parish. This measure was implemented by Statutory Instrument 1984 No 411 known as the Guildford Parishes Order, which adjusted the ward boundaries at the same time. That Order also produced a number of minor changes to other Guildford parish boundaries the most significant of which, other than the Send-Clandon boundary change, was the transfer of the easterly part of Shalford parish to St Martha's parish in Tillingbourne ward.

== Results by ward ==
Ash (top 3 candidates elected)
Party	Candidate	Votes	%	±%
Conservative	John Ades	1699		
Conservative	Rosemary Hall	1524		
Conservative	Michael Cole	1518		
Alliance	Alan Hillier	1459		
Alliance	George Dowdell	1318		
Alliance	Angela Pink	1228		
Labour	Kevin Jenkinson	281		
Labour	Peter Green	279		
Labour	Geoffery Smith	276		
Majority		59		
Conservative hold		Swing		
Conservative hold		Swing		
Conservative hold		Swing		

Ash Vale (top 2 candidates elected)
Party	Candidate	Votes	%	±%
Conservative	Joan Golding	1166		
Conservative	Kary Lloyd-Jones	1114		
Alliance	Janet Dallison	981		
Alliance	George Walsh	980		
Labour	Brian Mountain	175		
Labour	Bryan Rogers	133		
Majority		133		
Conservative hold		Swing		
Conservative hold		Swing		

Christchurch (top 2 candidates elected)
Party	Candidate	Votes	%	±%
Conservative	Andrew Hodges	1444		
Conservative	Rodger Marjoribanks	1384		
Alliance	Gordon Hall	531		
Alliance	Kate Mercer	529		
Labour	Peter Waterhouse	88		
Labour	Mary Wu	81		
Majority		853		
Conservative hold		Swing		
Conservative hold		Swing		

Clandon & Horsley (top 3 candidates elected)
Party	Candidate	Votes	%	±%
Conservative	Jennifer Powell	2474		
Conservative	Douglas May	2453		
Conservative	Gillian Drakeford	2349		
Alliance	Peter Webb	789		
Alliance	Alan Ridler	750		
Alliance	Roland Boissevain	701		
Labour	Meriel Beynon	190		
Labour	Joan Haimes	176		
Labour	Keith Parfitt	140		
Majority		1560		
Conservative hold		Swing		
Conservative hold		Swing		
Conservative hold		Swing		

Effingham (only 1 candidate elected)
Party	Candidate	Votes	%	±%
Conservative	Antony Page	673		
Alliance	Frank Oxford	205		
Labour	John Rowley	55		
Majority		468		
Conservative hold		Swing		

Friary & St. Nicolas (top 3 candidates elected)
Party	Candidate	Votes	%	±%
Alliance	Richard Marks	1788		
Alliance	Robert Blundell	1773		
Alliance	Jay Mercer	1645		
Conservative	Leonard Boxall	972		
Conservative	Philip Hooper	957		
Conservative	Lewis Short	933		
Labour	Sheila Barbour	311		
Labour	Angela Gunning	305		
Labour	Brenda Ecclestone	301		
Majority		673		
Alliance hold		Swing		
Alliance hold		Swing		
Alliance hold		Swing		

Holy Trinity (top 2 candidates elected)
Party	Candidate	Votes	%	±%
Conservative	Elizabeth Cobbett	1196		
Conservative	Tony Allenby	1147		
Alliance	Gordon Bridger	1079		
Alliance	Graham Maynard	965		
Labour	Martin Ecclestone	115		
Labour	Diane O'Keefe	112		
Majority		68		
Conservative hold		Swing		
Conservative hold		Swing		

Lovelace (only 1 candidate elected)
Party	Candidate	Votes	%	±%
Conservative	Jon Catten	521		
Alliance	John Hartley	426		
Labour	June Shepperd	65		
Majority		95		
Conservative hold		Swing		

Merrow & Burpham (top 3 candidates elected)
Party	Candidate	Votes	%	±%
Conservative	Paul Johnson	2409		
Conservative	Timothy Hargrave	2379		
Conservative	Jennifer Jordan	2345		
Alliance	Paul Green	1535		
Alliance	Margaret Fricker	1504		
Alliance	Julie Schoefield	1433		
Labour	Michael Hornsby-Smith	437		
Labour	Malcolm Hill	413		
Labour	Margaret Rogers	367		
Majority		810		
Conservative hold		Swing		
Conservative hold		Swing		
Conservative hold		Swing		

Normandy (only 1 candidate elected)
Party	Candidate	Votes	%	±%
Alliance	Wendy Gardiner	630		
Conservative	John Lockyer-Nibbs	618		
Labour	Phelim Brady	59		
Majority		12		
Alliance gain from Conservative		Swing		

Onslow (top 3 candidates elected)
Party	Candidate	Votes	%	±%
Alliance	Lynda Strudwick	1356		
Alliance	Tony Philips	1295		
Conservative	Bernard Parke	1151		
Alliance	Braith Harris	1113		
Conservative	Kenneth Johns	954		
Conservative	Mary Johns	896		
Labour	Carmel Rodgers	410		
Labour	Joseph Bullock	385		
Labour	Florence Flynn	377		
Majority		38		
Alliance hold		Swing		
Alliance hold		Swing		
Conservative hold		Swing		

Pilgrims (top 2 candidates elected)
Party	Candidate	Votes	%	±%
Conservative	Derek Pinks	1031		
Conservative	Malcolm Williamson	1006		
Alliance	Nicolette Clark	373		
Alliance	Evelyn Mellor	341		
Labour	Estelle Margereson	104		
Labour	Richard Rogers	95		
Majority		633		
Conservative hold		Swing		
Conservative hold		Swing		

Pirbright (only 1 candidate elected)
Party	Candidate	Votes	%	±%
Conservative	Catherine Cobley	520		
Alliance	Mary Laker	362		
Labour	Cecilia Brindle	21		
Majority		158		
Conservative hold		Swing		

Send (top 2 candidates elected)
Party	Candidate	Votes	%	±%
Conservative	Keith Taylor	910		
Conservative	Geoffrey Smith	888		
Alliance	Gloria Henson	499		
Alliance	Anne Lambe	483		
Labour	Alan Barnes	110		
Labour	Barbara Dinnage	87		
Majority		389		
Conservative hold		Swing		
Conservative hold		Swing		

Shalford (only 1 candidate elected)
Party	Candidate	Votes	%	±%
Conservative	Sarah Stewart	922		
Alliance	Leonard Grugeon	712		
Majority		210		
Conservative hold		Swing		

Stoke (top 3 candidates elected)
Party	Candidate	Votes	%	±%
Labour	Bill Bellerby	2039		
Labour	Sallie Thornberry	1471		
Labour	Heather Tipton	1320		
Conservative	Robert Gregory	555		
Conservative	Paul Fleming	476		
Conservative	Amelia Harris	470		
Alliance	David Hopkins	359		
Alliance	Brian Johnston	317		
Alliance	John Hutt	289		
Majority		765		
Labour hold		Swing		
Labour hold		Swing		
Labour hold		Swing		

Stoughton (top 3 candidates elected)
Party	Candidate	Votes	%	±%
Alliance	Christopher Fox	1552		
Alliance	Sue Fox	1401		
Alliance	Jayne Holder	1386		
Conservative	Ralph Jordan	1086		
Conservative	Shelia Knight	943		
Conservative	Rosemary Safford	901		
Labour	Michael Belford	373		
Labour	Michael Gunn	366		
Labour	William Saunders	352		
Majority		300		
Alliance hold		Swing		
Alliance hold		Swing		
Alliance gain from Conservative		Swing		

Tillingbourne (top 2 candidates elected)
Party	Candidate	Votes	%	±%
Conservative	Barbara Pattman	1498		
Conservative	Nicholas Brougham	1295		
Labour	Prosper Dowden	516		
Majority		779		
Conservative hold		Swing		
Conservative gain from Independent		Swing		

Tongham (only 1 candidate elected)
Party	Candidate	Votes	%	±%
Conservative	Percy Davies	316		
Alliance	Gilbert Molkenthin	237		
Labour	Elizabeth Bullock	64		
Majority		79		
Conservative hold		Swing		

Westborough (top 3 candidates elected)
Party	Candidate	Votes	%	±%
Labour	Doreen Bellerby	1491		
Labour	Jack Patrick	1344		
Labour	John Woodhatch	1202		
Alliance	Peter Anderson	586		
Alliance	Norman Needham	580		
Conservative	Michael Fisher	565		
Conservative	Anthony Horne	562		
Alliance	Helen Beckett	538		
Majority		616		
Labour hold		Swing		
Labour hold		Swing		
Labour hold		Swing		

Worplesdon (top 3 candidates elected)
Party	Candidate	Votes	%	±%
Conservative	Clare Griffin	1862		
Conservative	Shirley Lloyd	1730		
Conservative	Roy Price	1723		
Alliance	Arthur Crocker	1562		
Alliance	Margaret Scott	1557		
Alliance	Trevor Stables	1327		
Independent	Bill Williams	606		
Labour	Jeffrey Brindle	162		
Labour	Harold Richards	128		
Labour	Thomas Walder	127		
Majority		161		
Conservative hold		Swing		
Conservative hold		Swing		
Conservative hold		Swing		
