= Dacorum Borough Council elections =

Local government elections in Hertfordshire, England

Dacorum Borough Council in Hertfordshire, England is elected every four years. Since the last boundary changes in 2007, 51 councillors have been elected from 25 wards.

== Council elections ==
Composition of the council
Year	Conservative	Labour	Liberal Democrats (Note: Includes totals for the predecessors of the Liberal Democrats, the Liberal Party and SDP (both of which participated in the Alliance).)	Independents & Others	Council control after election
Local government reorganisation; council established (62 seats)
1973	25	33	0	4	Labour
1976	38	21	0	3	Conservative
New ward boundaries (58 seats)
1979	32	23	0	3	Conservative
1983	36	17	3	2	Conservative
1987	40	8	10	0	Conservative
1991	38	16	4	0	Conservative
1995	19	33	4	2	Labour
New ward boundaries (52 seats)
1999	26	17	6	0	Conservative
2003	32	14	6	0	Conservative
New ward boundaries (51 seats)
2007	44	2	5	0	Conservative
2011	43	2	6	0	Conservative
2015	46	2	3	0	Conservative
2019	31	0	19	1	Conservative
2023	18	3	28	2	Liberal Democrats

- 1973 Dacorum District Council election
- 1976 Dacorum District Council election
- 1979 Dacorum District Council election (New ward boundaries)
- 1983 Dacorum District Council election
- 1987 Dacorum Borough Council election (Borough boundary changes took place but the number of seats remained the same)
- 1991 Dacorum Borough Council election (Borough boundary changes took place but the number of seats remained the same)
- 1995 Dacorum Borough Council election
- 1999 Dacorum Borough Council election (New ward boundaries reduced the number of seats by 6)
- 2003 Dacorum Borough Council election
- 2007 Dacorum Borough Council election (New ward boundaries reduced the number of seats by 1)
- 2011 Dacorum Borough Council election
- 2015 Dacorum Borough Council election
- 2019 Dacorum Borough Council election
- 2023 Dacorum Borough Council election

== Results maps ==
1979 results map

1983 results map

1987 results map

1991 results map

1995 results map

1999 results map

2003 results map

2007 results map

2011 results map

2015 results map

2019 results map

2023 results map

== By-election results ==
=== 1995–1999 ===
Leverstock Green By-Election 3 July 1997
Party	Candidate	Votes	%	±%
Conservative		1,338	69.4	+26.6
Labour		496	25.7	−19.0
Liberal Democrats		93	4.8	−7.7
Majority		842	43.7	
Turnout		1,927	36.0	
Conservative gain from Labour		Swing		

=== 1999–2003 ===
Highfield St Paul By-Election 3 June 1999 (3)
Party	Candidate	Votes	%	±%
Labour		845		
Labour		802		
Labour		743		
Liberal Democrats		415		
Liberal Democrats		372		
Liberal Democrats		322		
Conservative		302		
Conservative		289		
Conservative		277		
Turnout		4,367	29.0	
Labour hold		Swing		
Labour hold		Swing		

Berkhamsted West By-Election 16 November 2000 (2)
Party	Candidate	Votes	%	±%
Conservative	Carol Green	699		
Conservative	Ian Reay	695		
Liberal Democrats	Garrick Stevens	559		
Liberal Democrats	Peter Such	521		
Labour	Bertram Bannister	89		
Labour	Beryl Milne	88		
Turnout		2,651	32.6	
Conservative gain from Liberal Democrats		Swing		
Conservative gain from Liberal Democrats		Swing		

Bovingdon, Flaunden & Chipperfield By-Election 7 June 2001
Party	Candidate	Votes	%	±%
Conservative	Susan Bradnock & Richard Roberts	2,264 & 1,931	56.8	−5.7
Liberal Democrats	David Griffiths & Carol Richardson	896 & 755	22.5	+2.5
Labour	Beryl Milnes & Alan Oliver	827 & 769	20.7	+3.3
Majority		1,368	34.3	
Turnout		3,987		
Conservative hold		Swing		

Woodall Farm By-Election 21 November 2002
Party	Candidate	Votes	%	±%
Labour	Alan Olive	424	40.8	−6.8
Conservative	Stephen Mark Holmes	398	38.3	−14.1
Liberal Democrats	Michael John Bethune	204	19.6	+19.6
UKIP	Barry Newton	13	1.3	+1.3
Majority		26	2.5	
Turnout		1,039	23.0	
Labour gain from Conservative		Swing		

=== 2003–2007 ===
Bennetts End By-Election 1 April 2004
Party	Candidate	Votes	%	±%
Labour	Paul Gronert	770	52.7	−5.7
Conservative	Kevin Minier	516	35.3	+9.6
Liberal Democrats	Janet Dashwood	176	12.0	−4.0
Majority		254	17.4	
Turnout		1,462	34.0	
Labour hold		Swing		

Adeyfield East By-Election 9 June 2005
Party	Candidate	Votes	%	±%
Labour	Jane Hogg	624	43.2	+6.5
Conservative	Frances Ryan	618	42.8	−3.8
Liberal Democrats	Doreen Coburn	201	13.9	+0.0
Majority		6	0.4	
Turnout		1,443	33.4	
Labour gain from Conservative		Swing		

Chaulden & Shrubhill By-Election 20 October 2005
Party	Candidate	Votes	%	±%
Conservative	Fiona Guest	552	46.8	+10.2
Labour	Susan White	514	43.6	−1.0
Liberal Democrats	Stuart Watkin	113	9.6	−9.2
Majority		38	3.2	
Turnout		1,179	30.5	
Conservative gain from Labour		Swing		

Nash Mills By-Election 20 October 2005
Party	Candidate	Votes	%	±%
Conservative	Lucy Foster	382	54.3	+9.0
Labour	Mark Quinn	276	39.2	−4.0
Liberal Democrats	Gerald Coulter	45	6.4	−5.1
Majority		106	15.1	
Turnout		703	33.5	
Conservative hold		Swing		

Highfield St Pauls By-Election 10 November 2005
Party	Candidate	Votes	%	±%
Liberal Democrats	Brenda Link	835	52.8	+19.0
Labour	Stephen Fisher	498	31.5	−15.0
Conservative	Kevin Minier	249	15.7	−3.9
Majority		337	21.3	
Turnout		1,582	30.1	
Liberal Democrats gain from Labour		Swing		

Warners End By-Election 16 March 2006
Party	Candidate	Votes	%	±%
Labour	Margaret Coxage	570	39.3	−3.9
Conservative	John Whitman	457	31.5	−12.2
Liberal Democrats	Stephen Wilson	250	17.2	+4.1
National Front	Simon Deacon	106	7.3	+7.3
Green	Paul Harris	42	2.9	+2.9
UKIP	Barry Newton	26	1.8	+1.8
Majority		113	7.8	
Turnout		1,451	40.2	
Labour gain from Conservative		Swing		

=== 2007–2011 ===
Adeyfield West By-Election 11 March 2010
Party	Candidate	Votes	%	±%
Conservative	Dan Wood	486	32.8	−8.6
Labour	Sue White	429	29.0	−13.3
Liberal Democrats	Steve Wilson	362	24.5	+8.1
BNP	Janet Price	203	13.7	+13.7
Majority		57	3.8	
Turnout		1,480	35.8	
Conservative hold		Swing		

Aldbury and Wigginton By-Election 27 August 2010
Party	Candidate	Votes	%	±%
Liberal Democrats	Rosemarie Hollinghurst	593	64.7	+29
Conservative	Paul Richardson	305	33.1	−24
Labour	Thomas Arden Wright	18	1.9	−4
Majority		288	31	
Turnout		916	47	
Liberal Democrats hold		Swing	26%	

=== 2011–2015 ===
Woodhall Farm By-Election 21 June 2012
Party	Candidate	Votes	%	±%
Conservative	Rosie Sutton	566	49.0	
Labour	Paul Eastwood	406	35.1	
Liberal Democrats	Nitesh Dave	70	6.1	
English Democrat	Simon Deacon	47	4.1	
UKIP	Howard Koch	43	3.7	
Green	Paul De Hoest	24	2.1	
Majority		160	13.8	
Turnout		1159	27.24	
Conservative hold		Swing		

Vacancy caused by resignation of Conservative incumbent Stephen Holmes.

Adeyfield West By-Election 21 March 2013
Party	Candidate	Votes	%	±%
Liberal Democrats	Ron TINDALL	363	32.6	+18.1
Labour	Mike MOORE	278	25.0	−17.5
Conservative	Barry NEWTON	229	20.6	−22.5
UKIP	Noel SWINFORD	193	17.3	+17.3
English Democrat	Simon DEACON	51	4.6	+4.6
Majority		85		
Turnout		4174	26.68	
Liberal Democrats gain from Labour		Swing		

Vacancy caused by resignation of Labour incumbent. Percentage changes are since May 2011

=== 2015–2019 ===
Adyfield West By-Election 29 September 2016
Party	Candidate	Votes	%	±%
Liberal Democrats	Adrian England	520		
Conservative	Tony Gallagher	233		
Labour	Gary Michael Cook	166		
UKIP	Rachel Catherine Biggs	115		
Green	Angela May Lynch	17		
Majority		287		
Turnout		1051	24.6	
Liberal Democrats gain from Conservative		Swing		

Northchurch By-Election 8 March 2018
Party	Candidate	Votes	%	±%
Liberal Democrats	Lara Pringle	545		
Conservative	Rob McCarthy	260		
Labour	Harry Hawden	97		
Green	Joe Pitts	19		
Majority		285		
Turnout		921	40.5	
Liberal Democrats gain from Conservative		Swing		

=== 2019–2023 ===
Leverstock Green By-Election 6 May 2021
Party	Candidate	Votes	%	±%
Conservative	Neil Harden	1,459	60.5	+12.8
Labour	Ijlal Malik	470	19.5	−0.8
Liberal Democrats	Anna Wellings Purvis	298	12.4	−3.5
Green	Sherief Hassan	185	7.7	−8.4
Majority		989	41.0	
Turnout		2,412		
Conservative hold		Swing		

Tring Central By-Election 6 May 2021
Party	Candidate	Votes	%	±%
Liberal Democrats	Sheron Wilkie	925	55.3	+14.5
Conservative	Joseph Vardon-Hynard	438	26.2	+0.4
Green	Joe Stopps	172	10.3	−7.5
Labour	Jim Lawler	137	8.2	+0.7
Majority		487	29.1	
Turnout		1,672		
Liberal Democrats hold		Swing		

Berkhamsted West By-Election 3 February 2022
Party	Candidate	Votes	%	±%
Liberal Democrats	Anne Foster	924	64.1	+13.9
Conservative	Gary Moore	318	22.1	−5.6
Green	Kevin Fielding	130	9.0	−5.9
Labour	Peter Scott	69	4.8	−2.5
Majority		606	42.1	
Turnout		1,441		
Liberal Democrats hold		Swing		

Boxmoor By-Election 3 February 2022
Party	Candidate	Votes	%	±%
Liberal Democrats	Simy Dhyani	1,319	60.5	+18.3
Conservative	Brandon Geary	599	27.5	−4.3
Labour	Cameron Brady-Turner	171	7.8	−6.2
Green	Sherief Hassan	92	4.2	−7.8
Majority		720	33.0	
Turnout		2,181		
Liberal Democrats hold		Swing		

=== 2023–2027 ===
Tring West and Rural By-Election 15 February 2024
Party	Candidate	Votes	%	±%
Liberal Democrats	Caroline Smith-Wright	899	62.7	
Conservative	Mike Hicks	303	21.1	
Green	Joe Stopps	122	8.5	
Labour	James Lawler	109	7.6	
Majority		596	41.6	
Turnout		1,433		
Liberal Democrats hold		Swing		

Bennetts End By-Election 21 November 2024
Party	Candidate	Votes	%	±%
Labour	Lin Greenfield	318	37.1	
Conservative	Mike Hicks	313	36.5	
Green	Andrew Lambert	102	11.9	
Reform	Christopher Morris	92	10.7	
Liberal Democrats	Lloyd Harris	32	3.7	
Majority		5	0.6	
Turnout		857		
Labour gain from Independent		Swing		

Hemel Hempstead Town By-Election 21 November 2024
Party	Candidate	Votes	%	±%
Conservative	Neil Harden	347	43.7	
Liberal Democrats	Aatish Pattni	174	21.9	
Labour	Mohamed Fawzi	147	18.5	
Reform	Silvi Sutherland	79	9.9	
Green	Christine Talbot	47	5.9	
Majority		173	21.8	
Turnout		794		
Conservative gain from Liberal Democrats		Swing		

Berkhamsted West By-Election 24 July 2025
Party	Candidate	Votes	%	±%
Liberal Democrats	Will Jankowski	643	56.4	
Conservative	Ben Rolfe	357	31.3	
Green	Rose Sheridan	99	8.7	
Labour	Jim Lawler	41	3.6	
Majority		286	25.1	
Turnout		1,140		
Liberal Democrats hold		Swing		

Apsley and Corner Hall By-Election 11 June 2026
Party	Candidate	Votes	%	±%
Liberal Democrats	Hugo Hardy	742	32.9	
Reform	Andrew Garnett	552	24.5	
Conservative	Hubert Wilson	404	17.9	
Independent	Eric Johnson	213	9.5	
Green	Connor Manship	181	8.0	
Labour	Bailey Hewitt	161	7.1	
Majority		190	8.4	
Turnout		2,253		
Liberal Democrats hold		Swing		
