= 1973 Dacorum District Council election =

1973 English local election

- 10 May 1973

All 62 seats to Dacorum District Council 32 seats needed for a majority

	First party	Second party	Third party
Party	Labour	Conservative	Independent
Seats won	33	25	4
Popular vote	53,449	48,434	5,035
Percentage	47.2%	42.8%	4.4%
Control after election
Labour

The 1973 Dacorum District Council election took place on 10 May 1973 to elect members of Dacorum District Council in Hertfordshire, England. This was on the same day as other local elections.

This was the inaugural election to the council following its formation by the Local Government Act 1972.

== Summary ==
=== Election result ===
1973 Dacorum District Council election
Party	Candidates	Seats	Gains	Losses	Net gain/loss	Seats %	Votes %	Votes	+/−
Labour	59	33	N/A	N/A	N/A	53.2	47.2	53,449	N/A
Conservative	58	25	N/A	N/A	N/A	40.3	42.8	48,434	N/A
Independent	8	4	N/A	N/A	N/A	6.5	4.4	5,035	N/A
Liberal	8	0	N/A	N/A	N/A	0.0	4.6	5,185	N/A
Communist	8	0	N/A	N/A	N/A	0.0	1.0	1,093	N/A

== Ward results ==
=== Bovingdon & Flaunden ===
Bovingdon & Flaunden (2 seats)
Party	Candidate	Votes	%
Independent	N. Douthwaite-Hodges	491	36.3
Conservative	R. Lown	447	33.1
Labour	D. Phillips	413	30.6
Labour	T. Latton	374	27.7
Independent	A. Pritchard	153	11.3
Turnout		~1,351	51.4
Registered electors		2,629	
Independent win (new seat)			
Conservative win (new seat)			

=== Chipperfield ===
Chipperfield
Party	Candidate	Votes	%
Conservative	P. Vincent	305	77.4
Labour	G. Pooley	89	22.6
Majority		216	54.8
Turnout		394	31.3
Registered electors		1,259	
Conservative win (new seat)			

=== Kings Langley ===
Kings Langley (2 seats)
Party	Candidate	Votes	%
Conservative	A. Old	840	54.9
Conservative	W. Driver	770	50.3
Labour	D. Moss	691	45.1
Labour	D. Oliver	667	43.6
Turnout		~1,531	44.0
Registered electors		3,480	
Conservative win (new seat)			
Conservative win (new seat)			

=== No. 1 (Hemel Hempstead: Central) ===
No. 1 (Hemel Hempstead: Central) (3 seats)
Party	Candidate	Votes	%
Conservative	M. King	722	43.1
Conservative	C. Fowler	714	42.7
Conservative	A. Toms	685	40.9
Liberal	J. Betteridge	457	27.3
Labour	R. Bailey	451	26.9
Labour	I. Gibson	426	25.4
Communist	J. Sell	43	2.6
Turnout		~1,674	46.1
Registered electors		3,631	
Conservative win (new seat)			
Conservative win (new seat)			
Conservative win (new seat)			

=== No. 2 (Hemel Hempstead: Northeast) ===
No. 2 (Hemel Hempstead: Northeast) (7 seats)
Party	Candidate	Votes	%
Labour	V. Stanley	1,519	61.9
Labour	F. Lacey	1,516	61.8
Labour	O. Taylor	1,468	59.8
Labour	J. Coulter	1,451	58.0
Labour	M. Young	1,423	57.9
Labour	P. Ryan	1,422	57.9
Labour	S. Aldis	1,399	57.0
Conservative	B. Cooper	758	30.9
Conservative	H. Corlett	709	28.9
Conservative	B. Langdon-Pratt	698	28.4
Conservative	J. Ratcliffe	695	28.3
Conservative	G. Crichton-Smith	694	28.3
Conservative	M. Cosgrave	692	28.2
Conservative	M. Hanson	683	27.8
Communist	J. Blackburn	175	7.1
Turnout		~2,454	25.8
Registered electors		9,512	
Labour win (new seat)			
Labour win (new seat)			
Labour win (new seat)			
Labour win (new seat)			
Labour win (new seat)			
Labour win (new seat)			
Labour win (new seat)			

=== No. 3 (Hemel Hempstead: Adeyfield) ===
No. 3 (Hemel Hempstead: Adeyfield) (4 seats)
Party	Candidate	Votes	%
Labour	L. Taber	1,096	67.3
Labour	M. Kalaher	1,077	66.1
Labour	G. Scribens	1,067	65.5
Labour	J. Lucas	1,045	64.1
Conservative	L. Oldrey	426	25.5
Conservative	D. Webb	401	24.6
Conservative	G. Ehrlich	382	23.4
Conservative	D. Everall	379	23.3
Communist	A. Blackbuck	107	6.6
Turnout		~1,629	29.5
Registered electors		5,523	
Labour win (new seat)			
Labour win (new seat)			
Labour win (new seat)			
Labour win (new seat)			

=== No. 4 (Hemel Hempstead: Southeast) ===
No. 4 (Hemel Hempstead: Southeast) (6 seats)
Party	Candidate	Votes	%
Labour	C. De Peyer	1,617	56.0
Labour	P. Doyle	1,611	55.8
Labour	P. Fyrth	1,572	54.4
Labour	D. Fane	1,570	54.4
Labour	F. McDonnell	1,547	53.6
Labour	A. Monk	1,541	53.4
Conservative	D. Everall	1,085	37.6
Conservative	J. Johnson	1,068	37.0
Conservative	B. Luck	1,057	36.6
Conservative	J. Ehrlich	1,051	36.4
Conservative	D. Townsend	1,049	36.3
Conservative	P. Williamson	1,033	35.8
Communist	V. Belcher	183	6.3
Turnout		~2,888	35.2
Registered electors		8,205	
Labour win (new seat)			
Labour win (new seat)			
Labour win (new seat)			
Labour win (new seat)			
Labour win (new seat)			
Labour win (new seat)			

=== No. 5 (Hemel Hempstead: Apsley & Abbots Langley) ===
No. 5 (Hemel Hempstead: Apsley & Abbots Langley) (5 seats)
Party	Candidate	Votes	%
Labour	B. Fyrth	1,237	41.7
Labour	A. Hornsby	1,214	41.0
Labour	G. Mitchell	1,205	40.7
Labour	L. Field	1,189	40.1
Conservative	C. Barling	1,144	38.6
Labour	R. Mitchell	1,128	38.1
Conservative	G. Ashby	1,126	38.0
Conservative	C. Appleby	1,120	37.8
Conservative	C. Brody	1,085	36.6
Conservative	B. Rigby	1,056	35.6
Independent	O. Collingwood	348	11.7
Communist	M. Belcher	237	8.0
Turnout		~2,964	40.4
Registered electors		7,337	
Labour win (new seat)			
Labour win (new seat)			
Labour win (new seat)			
Labour win (new seat)			
Conservative win (new seat)			

=== No. 7 (Hemel Hempstead: Boxmoor) ===
No. 7 (Hemel Hempstead: Boxmoor) (4 seats)
Party	Candidate	Votes	%
Labour	D. Holdsworth	1,423	42.2
Labour	J. Johnson	1,412	41.9
Labour	B. Oakley	1,373	40.7
Labour	D. Brown	1,353	40.2
Conservative	B. Isbister	1,197	35.5
Conservative	J. Buteux	1,150	34.1
Conservative	R. Denmead	1,101	32.7
Conservative	B. Waters	1,053	31.3
Liberal	N. Brown	566	16.8
Communist	D. Leigh	184	5.5
Turnout		~3,370	54.4
Registered electors		6,194	
Labour win (new seat)			
Labour win (new seat)			
Labour win (new seat)			
Labour win (new seat)			

=== No. 8 (Hemel Hempstead: Warners End) ===
No. 8 (Hemel Hempstead: Warners End) (4 seats)
Party	Candidate	Votes	%
Labour	J. Hooper	1,129	64.7
Labour	J. Geraghty	1,072	61.4
Labour	R. Power	1,032	59.1
Labour	J. Gale	1,003	57.5
Conservative	S. Elkins	508	29.1
Conservative	V. Peake	507	29.0
Conservative	M. Campbell	477	27.3
Conservative	J. Cheese	464	26.6
Communist	R. Deering	108	6.2
Turnout		~1,746	34.0
Registered electors		5,134	
Labour win (new seat)			
Labour win (new seat)			
Labour win (new seat)			
Labour win (new seat)			

=== No. 9 (Hemel Hempstead: Gadebridge) ===
No. 9 (Hemel Hempstead: Gadebridge) (2 seats)
Party	Candidate	Votes	%
Labour	I. Taylor	754	75.4
Labour	R. Parsons	737	73.7
Conservative	B. Gandy	188	18.8
Conservative	M. Ball	179	17.9
Communist	L. Leigh	56	5.6
Turnout		~999	27.8
Registered electors		3,595	
Labour win (new seat)			
Labour win (new seat)			

=== No. 10 (Berkhamsted: North Church) ===
No. 10 (Berkhamsted: North Church) (3 seats)
Party	Candidate	Votes	%
Conservative	J. Calnan	1,052	56.8
Labour	D. Hart	801	43.2
Labour	S. Bayliss	725	39.1
Labour	R. O'Reilly	677	36.5
Turnout		~1,853	47.9
Registered electors		3,869	
Conservative win (new seat)			
Labour win (new seat)			
Labour win (new seat)			

=== No. 11 (Berkhamsted: Castle & Sunnyside) ===
No. 11 (Berkhamsted: Castle & Sunnyside) (5 seats)
Party	Candidate	Votes	%
Conservative	J. Harrowell	1,872	51.1
Conservative	R. Peake	1,683	45.9
Conservative	I. Miller	1,678	45.8
Conservative	J. Bandy	1,653	45.1
Conservative	B. Thomas	1,593	43.4
Liberal	I. Scott	938	25.6
Liberal	R. Ford	890	24.3
Labour	A. Scott	860	23.5
Labour	T. May	783	21.4
Labour	B. May	763	20.8
Labour	W. Davies	706	19.3
Labour	T. Richardson	661	18.0
Turnout		~3,667	49.5
Registered electors		7,408	
Conservative win (new seat)			
Conservative win (new seat)			
Conservative win (new seat)			
Conservative win (new seat)			
Conservative win (new seat)			

=== No. 12 (Tring) ===
No. 12 (Tring) (5 seats)
Party	Candidate	Votes	%
Independent	R. Halling	1,662	35.8
Independent	G. McAndrew	1,421	30.6
Conservative	J. Collings	1,372	29.5
Conservative	E. Binks	1,261	27.2
Conservative	H. Valentine	1,215	26.2
Conservative	R. Young	1,161	25.0
Conservative	B. York	1,125	24.2
Liberal	G. Fish	931	20.0
Liberal	E. Shepherd	884	19.0
Labour	A. Wheeler	679	14.6
Labour	P. Aldis	621	13.4
Labour	G. Kerr	548	11.8
Turnout		~4,644	72.1
Registered electors		6,441	
Independent win (new seat)			
Independent win (new seat)			
Conservative win (new seat)			
Conservative win (new seat)			
Conservative win (new seat)			

=== No. 13 (Aldbury & Tring Rural) ===
No. 13 (Aldbury & Tring Rural)
Party	Candidate	Votes	%
Conservative	G. Walters	352	50.8
Labour	R. Kerr	341	49.2
Majority		11	1.6
Turnout		693	53.6
Registered electors		1,293	
Conservative win (new seat)			

=== No. 14 (North Church) ===
No. 14 (North Church)
Party	Candidate	Votes	%
Conservative	J. Bird	242	77.3
Labour	M. Trainin	71	22.7
Majority		171	54.6
Turnout		313	34.1
Registered electors		917	
Conservative win (new seat)			

=== No. 15 (Wigginton) ===
No. 15 (Wigginton)
Party	Candidate	Votes	%
Conservative	B. Baker	216	55.7
Independent	H. Crocker	130	33.5
Labour	G. Howell-Thomas	42	10.8
Majority		86	22.2
Turnout		346	40.8
Registered electors		950	
Conservative win (new seat)			

=== No. 16 (Little Gaddesden & Nettledon) ===
No. 16 (Little Gaddesden & Nettledon)
Party	Candidate	Votes	%
Conservative	S. Whaley	517	50.5
Independent	P. Draper	382	37.3
Labour	P. Day	125	12.2
Majority		135	13.2
Turnout		1,024	56.1
Registered electors		1,824	
Conservative win (new seat)			

=== No. 20 (Markyate) ===
No. 20 (Markyate)
Party	Candidate	Votes	%
Conservative	T. Jones	441	60.7
Labour	D. Martin	285	39.3
Majority		156	21.5
Turnout		726	37.7
Registered electors		1,925	
Conservative win (new seat)			

=== No. 21 (Flamstead) ===
No. 21 (Flamstead)
Party	Candidate	Votes	%
Independent	W. Davies	448	93.1
Labour	R. Parfitt	33	6.9
Majority		415	86.3
Turnout		481	48.0
Registered electors		1,003	
Independent win (new seat)			

=== No. 22 (Great Gaddesden) ===
No. 22 (Great Gaddesden)
Party	Candidate	Votes	%
Conservative	C. Thomas	342	86.8
Labour	J. Mercer	52	13.2
Majority		290	73.6
Turnout		394	40.9
Registered electors		964	
Conservative win (new seat)			

=== South ===
South (2 seats)
Party	Candidate	Votes	%
Conservative	P. Benton	494	52.2
Conservative	D. Taylor	467	49.4
Liberal	M. Bell	265	28.0
Liberal	G. Lawrence	254	26.9
Labour	C. Thomas	186	19.7
Labour	R. Quinn	177	18.7
Turnout		~946	41.1
Registered electors		2,301	
Conservative win (new seat)			
Conservative win (new seat)			
