= 2011 Dacorum Borough Council election =

2011 UK local government election

- 5 May 2011

All 51 seats to Dacorum Borough Council 26 seats needed for a majority

	First party	Second party	Third party
Leader	Andrew Williams	Denise Rance	Keith White
Party	Conservative	Liberal Democrats	Labour
Seats won	43	6	2
Seat change	▼1	▲1	Steady
Popular vote	52,929	17,637	24,969
Percentage	53.9%	18.0%	25.4%
Swing	▼0.8%	▼2.3%	▲5.3%
- Winner of each seat at the 2011 Dacorum Borough Council election.
Control before election
Conservative
Control after election
Conservative

The 2011 Dacorum Borough Council election took place on 5 May 2011 to elect members of Dacorum Borough Council in Hertfordshire, England. This was on the same day as other local elections.

== Summary ==
=== Election result ===
2011 Dacorum Borough Council election
Party	Candidates	Seats	Gains	Losses	Net gain/loss	Seats %	Votes %	Votes	+/−
Conservative	51	43	1	2	▼1	84.3	53.9	52,929	–0.8
Liberal Democrats	51	6	1	0	▲1	11.8	18.0	17,637	–2.3
Labour	51	2	1	1	Steady	3.9	25.4	24,969	+5.3
Green	8	0	0	0	Steady	0.0	1.9	1,911	–1.1
Independent	2	0	0	0	Steady	0.0	0.5	497	–0.8
English Democrat	1	0	0	0	Steady	0.0	0.2	195	N/A

== Ward results ==
Incumbent councillors standing for re-election are marked with an asterisk (*). Changes in seats do not take into account by-elections or defections.

=== Adeyfield East ===
Adeyfield East (2 seats)
Party	Candidate	Votes	%	±%
Conservative	Alan Lawson*	778	52.7	–4.3
Conservative	William Wyatt-Lowe*	744	50.4	–4.2
Labour	Gary Cook	467	31.6	+1.8
Labour	Anne-Lise Johnsen	395	26.7	–0.1
Liberal Democrats	Sylvia Fry	128	8.7	–2.6
Liberal Democrats	Diane Wilson	109	7.4	–2.6
Green	Stephen Horsfall	103	7.0	N/A
Turnout		~1,481	37.2	+1.4
Registered electors		3,981		
Conservative hold				
Conservative hold				

=== Adeyfield West ===
Adeyfield West (2 seats)
Party	Candidate	Votes	%	±%
Conservative	Dan Wood	619	39.7	–0.1
Labour	Keith White*	611	39.2	–1.5
Conservative	Martin Crowhurst	594	38.1	+0.3
Labour	Susan White	592	37.9	–1.4
Liberal Democrats	Mark Rutherford	209	13.4	–2.3
Liberal Democrats	Steve Wilson	204	13.1	–0.9
Turnout		~1,541	37.5	+6.4
Registered electors		4,109		
Conservative hold				
Labour hold				

=== Aldbury & Wigginton ===
Aldbury & Wigginton
Party	Candidate	Votes	%	±%
Liberal Democrats	Rosemarie Hollinghurst	581	52.7	+16.0
Conservative	Stan Mills	444	40.3	–16.7
Labour	Tony Shaw	77	7.0	+0.6
Majority		137	12.4	N/A
Turnout		1,102	58.0	+13.2
Registered electors		1,901		
Liberal Democrats gain from Conservative		Swing	▲16.4	

=== Apsley & Corner Hall ===
Apsley & Corner Hall (3 seats)
Party	Candidate	Votes	%	±%
Conservative	Brian Ayling*	1,276	56.1	–7.1
Conservative	Michael Clark*	1,071	47.1	–10.1
Conservative	Colin Peter*	1,013	44.5	–12.5
Labour	Norman Jones	664	29.2	+9.9
Labour	James Hood	622	27.3	+9.7
Labour	Gillian Redman	611	26.8	+9.9
Liberal Democrats	Nicole Daly	290	12.7	–0.9
Liberal Democrats	Ron Tindall	290	12.7	+0.4
Liberal Democrats	Stuart Watkin	246	10.8	–0.4
Turnout		~2,276	35.5	+4.2
Registered electors		6,411		
Conservative hold				
Conservative hold				
Conservative hold				

=== Ashridge ===
Ashridge
Party	Candidate	Votes	%	±%
Conservative	Nick Tiley*	905	76.1	+1.3
Labour	James Seddon	150	12.6	+4.8
Liberal Democrats	Paul Elley	134	11.3	–6.1
Majority		755	63.5	+6.1
Turnout		1,189	55.8	+5.8
Registered electors		2,151		
Conservative hold		Swing	▼1.8	

=== Bennetts End ===
Bennetts End (2 seats)
Party	Candidate	Votes	%	±%
Conservative	Suqlain Mahmood*	701	39.9	–5.9
Conservative	Joann Wixted	639	36.4	–5.3
Labour	Michelle Lancaster*	593	33.8	–0.4
Labour	Tom Wright	515	29.3	–4.0
Liberal Democrats	Lynda Roe	210	12.0	–1.2
Liberal Democrats	Clare Adams	204	11.6	+0.5
English Democrat	Simon Deacon	195	11.1	N/A
Turnout		~1,759	38.7	+3.0
Registered electors		4,544		
Conservative hold				
Conservative hold				

=== Berkhamsted Castle ===
Berkhamsted Castle (2 seats)
Party	Candidate	Votes	%	±%
Conservative	David Collins	1,251	53.0	–3.4
Conservative	Fiona Macdonald	1,213	51.4	–0.5
Liberal Democrats	Ian Gent	795	33.7	–5.1
Liberal Democrats	Sally Symington	595	25.2	–11.9
Labour	Helen Leach	344	14.6	+8.4
Labour	Alan Olive	312	13.2	+7.6
Turnout		~2,365	50.9	+10.5
Registered electors		4,648		
Conservative hold				
Conservative hold				

=== Berkhamsted East ===
Berkhamsted East (2 seats)
Party	Candidate	Votes	%	±%
Conservative	Julie Laws*	996	45.5	+3.2
Conservative	Stephen Bateman	902	41.2	+0.3
Liberal Democrats	Garrick Stevens	678	31.0	–5.8
Liberal Democrats	John Lythgoe	597	27.3	–8.0
Labour	Ray Jones	326	14.9	+10.6
Independent	Norman Cutting	322	14.7	–5.3
Labour	Ellen Robson	304	13.9	+9.6
Turnout		~2,187	48.1	+9.4
Registered electors		4,548		
Conservative hold				
Conservative hold				

=== Berkhamsted West ===
Berkhamsted West (2 seats)
Party	Candidate	Votes	%	±%
Conservative	Carol Green*	1,149	52.1	–0.2
Conservative	Ian Reay*	1,138	51.6	+0.7
Liberal Democrats	Geraldine Corry	528	24.0	–13.6
Liberal Democrats	Hugo Hardy	407	18.5	–18.2
Labour	Peter Norman	379	17.2	+7.9
Labour	Sylvia Shaw	300	13.6	+6.2
Green	Paul de Hoest	274	12.4	N/A
Turnout		~2,209	48.3	+9.3
Registered electors		4,573		
Conservative hold				
Conservative hold				

=== Bovingdon, Flaunden & Chipperfield ===
Bovingdon, Flaunden & Chipperfield (3 seats)
Party	Candidate	Votes	%	±%
Conservative	Gill Chapman*	2,148	69.9	+1.8
Conservative	Jack Organ	1,959	63.8	–3.4
Conservative	Gbola Adeleke*	1,825	59.4	+2.4
Labour	Sharon Greene	438	14.3	+5.3
Labour	Beryl Milnes	435	14.2	+5.6
Labour	Richard Milnes	403	13.1	+6.3
Green	Martin Humphrey	362	11.8	+0.8
Liberal Democrats	Laura Carter-Brown	293	9.5	–5.6
Liberal Democrats	Martin Rance	247	8.0	–1.9
Liberal Democrats	Beth Townsend	230	7.5	–2.0
Turnout		~3,072	47.4	+7.2
Registered electors		6,482		
Conservative hold				
Conservative hold				
Conservative hold				

=== Boxmoor ===
Boxmoor (3 seats)
Party	Candidate	Votes	%	±%
Conservative	Neil Harden*	1,659	54.1	–3.6
Conservative	Janice Marshall*	1,625	53.0	–3.1
Conservative	Andrew Williams*	1,483	48.4	–2.9
Labour	Julia Coleman	809	26.4	+6.0
Labour	Ian Laidlaw-Dickson	733	23.9	+7.0
Labour	Helen Heenan	694	22.6	+6.3
Liberal Democrats	Malcolm Appleford	497	16.2	+0.4
Liberal Democrats	Alan Waugh	272	8.9	–5.8
Liberal Democrats	Robert Irving	265	8.6	–5.1
Green	Alan Johnson	265	8.6	–0.4
Green	Hazel Johnson	253	8.3	–0.2
Turnout		~3,063	48.3	+6.6
Registered electors		6,338		
Conservative hold				
Conservative hold				
Conservative hold				

=== Chaulden & Warners End ===
Chaulden & Warners End (3 seats)
Party	Candidate	Votes	%	±%
Conservative	Fiona Guest*	1,407	45.5	+8.7
Conservative	Graeme Elliott	1,342	43.4	+8.3
Conservative	John Whitman*	1,332	43.1	+8.2
Labour	Margaret Coxage	1,166	37.7	+3.4
Labour	Michael Bromberg	1,060	34.3	+3.4
Labour	Ron Coxage	1,060	34.3	+5.0
Green	Jane Cousins	372	12.0	–0.2
Liberal Democrats	Jenny Simmons	287	9.3	–1.2
Liberal Democrats	Colin Roe	221	7.2	–2.4
Liberal Democrats	Rachael Rance	193	6.2	–3.4
Turnout		~3,090	45.2	+5.7
Registered electors		6,834		
Conservative hold				
Conservative hold				
Conservative hold				

=== Gadebridge ===
Gadebridge (2 seats)
Party	Candidate	Votes	%	±%
Labour	Maureen Flint	828	44.6	+6.0
Conservative	Roger Taylor*	705	38.0	–7.6
Labour	Lara Parker	671	36.2	+4.5
Conservative	Jai Restall*	600	32.4	–8.2
Independent	Mick Young	175	9.4	N/A
Liberal Democrats	Jean Blackman	124	6.7	–5.1
Green	Paul Harris	107	5.8	–3.3
Liberal Democrats	Geoff Lawrence	91	4.9	–4.2
Turnout		~1,856	44.7	+10.4
Registered electors		4,153		
Labour gain from Conservative				
Conservative hold				

=== Grovehill ===
Grovehill (3 seats)
Party	Candidate	Votes	%	±%
Conservative	Alexander Bhinder*	1,042	50.0	–0.6
Conservative	Terence Douris*	939	45.1	–2.6
Conservative	Ann Ryan	928	44.6	–2.5
Labour	Anne Fisher	747	35.9	+3.7
Labour	Rose Harrison	620	29.8	+2.6
Labour	Rosa Gilbert	589	28.3	+2.0
Green	Paul Sandford	175	8.4	N/A
Liberal Democrats	Peter Ogundipe	157	7.5	–4.6
Liberal Democrats	Alex Bell	146	7.0	–1.2
Liberal Democrats	Tom Potter	144	6.9	–0.9
Turnout		~2,082	36.5	+3.9
Registered electors		5,703		
Conservative hold				
Conservative hold				
Conservative hold				

=== Hemel Hempstead Town ===
Hemel Hempstead Town (2 seats)
Party	Candidate	Votes	%	±%
Conservative	Graham Adshead	573	40.3	+4.2
Conservative	Anthony McKay	550	38.7	+6.0
Labour	Stefan Fisher	534	37.6	+0.7
Labour	Michael Moore*	520	36.6	+1.2
Liberal Democrats	Chris Angell	242	17.0	+0.3
Liberal Democrats	William Allen	214	15.1	–1.4
Turnout		~1,421	34.9	+5.5
Registered electors		4,071		
Conservative gain from Labour				
Conservative hold				

=== Highfield ===
Highfield (2 seats)
Party	Candidate	Votes	%	±%
Liberal Democrats	Brenda Link*	711	41.9	–6.1
Liberal Democrats	Lloyd Harris*	589	34.7	–4.5
Labour	Antony Briers	562	33.1	–0.8
Labour	Linda Rolph	464	27.4	–4.4
Conservative	Barry Newton	406	23.9	+4.9
Conservative	Goverdhan Silwal	309	18.2	+2.8
Turnout		~1,698	40.4	+2.1
Registered electors		4,202		
Liberal Democrats hold				
Liberal Democrats hold				

=== Kings Langley ===
Kings Langley (2 seats)
Party	Candidate	Votes	%	±%
Conservative	Alan Anderson*	1,213	62.7	+2.3
Conservative	Bob McLean*	1,089	56.3	+1.1
Labour	Gerry Angiolini	489	25.3	+3.6
Labour	Derek Collins	371	19.2	+1.4
Liberal Democrats	Ian Senior	279	14.4	+3.6
Liberal Democrats	Angela Tindall	194	10.0	±0.0
Turnout		~1,936	48.7	+4.7
Registered electors		3,975		
Conservative hold				
Conservative hold				

=== Leverstock Green ===
Leverstock Green (3 seats)
Party	Candidate	Votes	%	±%
Conservative	Hazel Bassadone*	1,790	61.3	–3.7
Conservative	Graham Sutton*	1,596	54.7	–6.3
Conservative	Margaret Griffiths*	1,568	53.7	–6.6
Labour	Jean Langdon	743	25.5	+7.0
Labour	Pia Larsen	659	22.6	+4.7
Labour	Lee Whitehill	648	22.2	+4.9
Liberal Democrats	Sheila Daly	387	13.3	+1.7
Liberal Democrats	Margaret Waugh	220	7.5	–3.3
Liberal Democrats	Margaret Colquhoun	214	7.3	–2.1
Turnout		~2,918	42.7	+5.7
Registered electors		6,834		
Conservative hold				
Conservative hold				
Conservative hold				

=== Nash Mills ===
Nash Mills
Party	Candidate	Votes	%	±%
Conservative	Geoffrey Doole	609	65.6	+0.8
Labour	Bernard Gronert	220	23.7	+0.6
Liberal Democrats	Barry Batchelor	99	10.7	–1.4
Majority		389	41.9	+0.2
Turnout		928	43.7	+5.9
Registered electors		2,147		
Conservative hold		Swing	▲0.1	

=== Northchurch ===
Northchurch
Party	Candidate	Votes	%	±%
Conservative	Alan Fantham*	731	68.6	–1.4
Liberal Democrats	Malcolm Rogers	190	17.8	–4.9
Labour	Barbara Gronert	144	13.5	+6.1
Majority		541	50.8	+3.5
Turnout		1,065	48.7	+7.5
Registered electors		2,215		
Conservative hold		Swing	▲1.8	

=== Tring Central ===
Tring Central (2 seats)
Party	Candidate	Votes	%	±%
Liberal Democrats	Nicholas Hollinghurst*	966	51.5	+2.5
Liberal Democrats	Denise Rance*	898	47.9	+0.6
Conservative	Stephen Hearn	764	40.7	+1.4
Conservative	Kerr Hill	581	31.0	–7.8
Labour	Dominic Hook	186	9.9	+5.4
Labour	Mary Khamis	159	8.5	+4.2
Turnout		~1,877	46.8	+5.3
Registered electors		4,012		
Liberal Democrats hold				
Liberal Democrats hold				

=== Tring East ===
Tring East
Party	Candidate	Votes	%	±%
Conservative	Penny Hearn*	685	52.5	–10.8
Liberal Democrats	Roxanne Ransley	525	40.2	+6.7
Labour	Lorraine Winslade	96	7.4	+4.2
Majority		160	12.3	–17.5
Turnout		1,306	59.7	+12.0
Registered electors		2,200		
Conservative hold		Swing	▼8.8	

=== Tring West & Rural ===
Tring West & Rural (2 seats)
Party	Candidate	Votes	%	±%
Liberal Democrats	Christopher Townsend*	1,017	46.2	+0.4
Conservative	Olive Conway	940	42.7	–4.3
Liberal Democrats	Stewart Tolley	890	40.4	–4.7
Conservative	Paul Richardson	851	38.7	–5.6
Labour	Emma Reed	219	10.0	+5.2
Labour	Frank Burgess	211	9.6	+5.1
Turnout		~2,200	53.2	+5.4
Registered electors		4,134		
Liberal Democrats hold				
Conservative hold				

=== Watling ===
Watling (2 seats)
Party	Candidate	Votes	%	±%
Conservative	Herbert Chapman*	1,217	65.1	–8.1
Conservative	David Lloyd*	1,158	62.0	–9.6
Labour	Gillian Edwards	312	16.7	+5.5
Liberal Democrats	John Vaites	262	14.0	+3.8
Labour	Tim Lyle	230	12.3	+2.1
Liberal Democrats	Bhadri Podichetty	112	6.0	–3.4
Turnout		~1,870	44.5	+8.3
Registered electors		4,203		
Conservative hold				
Conservative hold				

=== Woodhall Farm ===
Woodhall Farm (2 seats)
Party	Candidate	Votes	%	±%
Conservative	Stephen Holmes*	961	62.2	–3.7
Conservative	Colette Wyatt-Lowe*	912	59.0	–1.6
Labour	Alan Dickson	365	23.6	+6.1
Labour	Mick Maloney	322	20.8	+4.2
Liberal Democrats	Nitesh Dave	145	9.4	±0.0
Liberal Democrats	Gloria Crellin	111	7.2	–1.2
Turnout		~1,546	36.8	+7.6
Registered electors		4,202		
Conservative hold				
Conservative hold				
