= 1991 Dacorum Borough Council election =

1991 UK local government election

- 2 May 1991

All 58 seats to Dacorum Borough Council 30 seats needed for a majority

	First party	Second party	Third party
Party	Conservative	Labour	Liberal Democrats
Seats won	38	16	4
Seat change	▼2	▲8	▼6
Popular vote	45,306	32,504	22,001
Percentage	44.3%	31.8%	21.5%
Swing	▲0.6%	▲7.5%	▼10.5%
- Winner of each seat at the 1991 Dacorum Borough Council election.
Control before election
Conservative
Control after election
Conservative

The 1991 Dacorum Borough Council election took place on 2 May 1991 to elect members of Dacorum Borough Council in Hertfordshire, England. This was on the same day as other local elections.

== Summary ==
=== Election result ===
1991 Dacorum Borough Council election
Party	Candidates	Seats	Gains	Losses	Net gain/loss	Seats %	Votes %	Votes	+/−
Conservative	58	38	0	2	▼2	65.5	44.3	45,306	+0.6
Labour	58	16	8	0	▲8	27.6	31.8	32,504	+7.5
Liberal Democrats	52	4	2	8	▼6	6.9	21.5	22,001	–10.5
Green	7	0	0	0	Steady	0.0	1.4	1,442	N/A
Independent	4	0	0	0	Steady	0.0	1.1	1,080	N/A
National Front	1	0	0	0	Steady	0.0	<0.1	18	N/A

== Ward results ==
Incumbent councillors standing for re-election are marked with an asterisk (*). Changes in seats do not take into account by-elections or defections.

=== Adeyfield East ===
Adeyfield East (2 seats)
Party	Candidate	Votes	%	±%
Conservative	M. Griffiths	862	47.4	+7.7
Conservative	K. Reid	816	44.8	+7.8
Labour	C. Cohen	675	37.1	+7.6
Labour	M. Pesch	671	36.9	+8.1
Liberal Democrats	J. Hayward	250	13.7	–15.7
Liberal Democrats	V. Sleight	234	12.9	–14.4
Turnout		~1,820	47.4	–8.8
Registered electors		3,839		
Conservative hold				
Conservative hold				

=== Adeyfield West ===
Adeyfield West (3 seats)
Party	Candidate	Votes	%	±%
Labour	M. Young*	1,079	54.5	+13.8
Labour	L. Taber*	1,045	52.8	+14.7
Labour	R. Haverson	1,034	52.3	+16.4
Conservative	M. Davies	534	27.0	–3.2
Conservative	H. Scott	525	26.5	–3.5
Conservative	M. Mitchell	499	25.2	–4.1
Liberal Democrats	E. Bennett	311	15.7	–11.1
Liberal Democrats	J. Blackman	298	15.1	–11.3
Liberal Democrats	C. Swatton	274	13.9	–11.9
Turnout		~1,978	47.2	–10.6
Registered electors		4,191		
Labour hold				
Labour hold				
Labour hold				

=== Aldbury & Wigginton ===
Aldbury & Wigginton
Party	Candidate	Votes	%	±%
Conservative	A. Whitehead*	513	58.6	–4.2
Liberal Democrats	R. Hollinghurst	240	27.4	+0.2
Labour	S. Jackson	122	13.9	+3.9
Majority		273	31.2	–4.4
Turnout		875	52.0	–2.7
Registered electors		1,723		
Conservative hold		Swing	▼2.2	

=== Ashridge ===
Ashridge (2 seats)
Party	Candidate	Votes	%	±%
Conservative	F. Seely*	976	69.1	+1.8
Conservative	B. Gregory	894	63.3	–1.6
Liberal Democrats	M. James	278	19.7	–1.8
Labour	C. Cushion	268	19.0	+9.9
Labour	P. Harris	200	14.2	+5.4
Turnout		~1,413	52.0	–6.4
Registered electors		2,718		
Conservative hold				
Conservative hold				

=== Bennetts End ===
Bennetts End (3 seats)
Party	Candidate	Votes	%	±%
Labour	S. Harrison	1,097	55.7	+12.7
Labour	D. Jones	1,092	55.5	+12.5
Labour	A. Maclaughlin*	1,057	53.7	+12.1
Conservative	J. Stanton	543	27.6	–3.1
Conservative	A. Craigen	525	26.7	–2.4
Conservative	R. Stanton	516	26.2	–2.7
Liberal Democrats	C. Roe	259	13.2	–8.3
Liberal Democrats	J. Bethune	256	13.0	–8.1
Liberal Democrats	M. Rance	243	12.3	–7.8
Turnout		~1,969	45.6	–5.0
Registered electors		4,317		
Labour hold				
Labour hold				
Labour hold				

=== Berkhamsted Central ===
Berkhamsted Central (2 seats)
Party	Candidate	Votes	%	±%
Conservative	J. Dunbavand*	940	54.1	–1.8
Conservative	K. Coleman*	932	53.7	–0.6
Liberal Democrats	F. Earl	483	27.8	–6.7
Liberal Democrats	V. Earl	461	26.6	–1.8
Green	J. Hannaway	232	13.4	N/A
Labour	G. Bellamy	209	12.0	+1.4
Labour	B. Reiss	125	7.2	–2.5
Turnout		~1,736	46.0	–4.0
Registered electors		3,774		
Conservative hold				
Conservative hold				

=== Berkhamsted East ===
Berkhamsted East (3 seats)
Party	Candidate	Votes	%	±%
Conservative	P. Ginger*	1,052	49.0	–0.8
Conservative	C. Green	932	43.4	–3.1
Conservative	D. Roberts	928	43.2	–0.2
Liberal Democrats	C. Olney	506	23.5	–9.0
Labour	D. Freeman	486	22.6	+7.0
Liberal Democrats	A. Horton	427	19.9	–9.7
Liberal Democrats	R. Winter	426	19.8	–9.4
Labour	C. Morrish	387	18.0	+2.6
Labour	D. Eaude	373	17.4	+2.9
Independent	S. Taylor	206	9.6	N/A
Independent	W. Carlile-Stitson	183	8.5	N/A
Green	D. Tookey	167	7.8	N/A
Turnout		~2,149	45.2	–3.5
Registered electors		4,754		
Conservative hold				
Conservative hold				
Conservative hold				

=== Berkhamsted West ===
Berkhamsted West (2 seats)
Party	Candidate	Votes	%	±%
Liberal Democrats	S. Sharpe	918	52.6	+19.4
Liberal Democrats	E. Patterson	781	44.8	N/A
Conservative	I. Brown	557	31.9	–17.9
Conservative	M. Rix	522	29.9	–18.9
Labour	M. Gilbert	208	11.9	–18.6
Labour	M. Hall	178	10.2	–12.8
Green	D. Woollacott	128	7.3	N/A
Turnout		~1,745	54.3	+2.4
Registered electors		3,214		
Liberal Democrats gain from Conservative				
Liberal Democrats gain from Conservative				

=== Bovingdon & Flaunden ===
Bovingdon & Flaunden (2 seats)
Party	Candidate	Votes	%	±%
Conservative	R. McLellan	1,050	65.9	+11.4
Conservative	A. Janes*	980	61.5	+12.2
Labour	C. Cooke	474	29.8	+19.6
Labour	K. Underwood	440	27.6	+18.8
Turnout		~1,593	42.8	–11.5
Registered electors		3,721		
Conservative hold				
Conservative hold				

=== Boxmoor ===
Boxmoor (3 seats)
Party	Candidate	Votes	%	±%
Conservative	J. Buteux*	1,179	47.8	+2.3
Conservative	J. Marshall*	1,090	44.2	+0.3
Conservative	G. Richardson	1,075	43.6	+0.2
Labour	E. Marshall	716	29.0	+8.7
Labour	R. Hutchison	669	27.1	+7.5
Labour	K. Greene	658	26.7	+7.6
Liberal Democrats	C. Richardson	571	23.1	–8.7
Liberal Democrats	P. Gregory	535	21.7	–8.3
Liberal Democrats	F. Campbell	484	19.6	–9.5
Turnout		~2,467	51.2	–6.5
Registered electors		4,819		
Conservative hold				
Conservative hold				
Conservative hold				

=== Central ===
Central (2 seats)
Party	Candidate	Votes	%	±%
Conservative	A. Williams*	755	43.0	+0.9
Conservative	C. Appleby*	740	42.1	+1.5
Liberal Democrats	A. Winter	659	37.5	–1.1
Liberal Democrats	C. Robins	600	34.1	–1.5
Labour	F. Burgess	330	18.8	–2.9
Labour	H. Seeligh	292	16.6	–4.8
Turnout		~1,758	45.8	–9.7
Registered electors		3,838		
Conservative hold				
Conservative hold				

=== Chaulden ===
Chaulden
Party	Candidate	Votes	%	±%
Labour	A. Dennison	685	53.5	+5.1
Conservative	C. Horne	433	33.8	+1.5
Liberal Democrats	D. Izzett	145	11.3	–8.0
National Front	J. McAuley	18	1.4	N/A
Majority		252	19.7	+3.6
Turnout		1,281	55.9	–4.1
Registered electors		2,298		
Labour hold		Swing	▲1.8	

=== Chipperfield ===
Chipperfield
Party	Candidate	Votes	%	±%
Conservative	J. Nichols*	497	74.5	+20.0
Labour	M. Tearle	170	25.5	+4.2
Majority		327	49.0	+18.7
Turnout		667	51.9	–9.1
Registered electors		1,290		
Conservative hold		Swing	▲7.9	

=== Crabtree ===
Crabtree (3 seats)
Party	Candidate	Votes	%	±%
Conservative	S. Byfield*	1,017	44.2	+4.2
Conservative	M. Griffiths*	1,011	43.9	+5.2
Conservative	T. Eastman*	963	41.8	+3.9
Labour	G. Cook	907	39.4	+9.7
Labour	Y. Leadbeater	893	38.8	+10.7
Labour	N. Singam	743	32.3	+4.4
Liberal Democrats	S. Wilson	318	13.8	–14.3
Liberal Democrats	M. Thompson	274	11.9	–16.0
Turnout		~2,303	46.4	–10.6
Registered electors		4,964		
Conservative hold				
Conservative hold				
Conservative hold				

=== Cupid Green ===
Cupid Green (2 seats)
Party	Candidate	Votes	%	±%
Conservative	M. Griffiths*	945	52.0	+6.3
Conservative	D. Samuels*	921	50.7	+8.3
Labour	R. Briggs	493	27.1	+9.0
Labour	J. Bradbury	473	26.0	+8.8
Liberal Democrats	S. Roberts	308	16.9	–15.9
Liberal Democrats	S. Frost	282	15.5	–15.7
Turnout		~1,818	38.5	–7.8
Registered electors		4,722		
Conservative hold				
Conservative hold				

=== Flamstead & Markyate ===
Flamstead & Markyate (2 seats)
Party	Candidate	Votes	%	±%
Conservative	J. Taunton*	849	55.0	–5.1
Conservative	N. Macgregor	815	52.8	–4.7
Labour	P. Silcock	292	18.9	–3.7
Labour	G. Hare	279	18.1	–2.6
Independent	R. Kent*	278	18.0	N/A
Liberal Democrats	J. Richardson	220	14.3	–1.1
Liberal Democrats	P. Willis	199	12.9	–1.7
Turnout		~1,543	47.3	–1.4
Registered electors		3,263		
Conservative hold				
Conservative hold				

=== Gadebridge ===
Gadebridge (2 seats)
Party	Candidate	Votes	%	±%
Labour	M. Flint	923	56.0	+22.4
Labour	W. Sapsford	779	47.3	+17.4
Independent	T. Boreham*	413	25.1	N/A
Conservative	J. Partridge	398	24.1	+0.8
Conservative	J. Reid	389	23.6	+2.4
Liberal Democrats	K. Hughes	207	12.6	–31.6
Turnout		~1,648	47.0	–13.1
Registered electors		3,507		
Labour gain from Liberal Democrats				
Labour gain from Liberal Democrats				

=== Grove Hill ===
Grove Hill (3 seats)
Party	Candidate	Votes	%	±%
Labour	A. Fisher	765	36.2	+11.5
Labour	B. Breslin	730	34.6	+12.2
Labour	P. Hinson	695	32.9	+10.9
Conservative	D. Fell	637	30.2	+1.2
Liberal Democrats	J. Blackman*	636	30.1	–13.6
Conservative	J. Manning	632	29.9	+1.3
Conservative	P. Stanyon	608	28.8	+1.9
Liberal Democrats	A. Gillings	567	26.9	–16.0
Liberal Democrats	G. Edwards	544	25.8	–14.7
Turnout		~2,111	37.6	–7.4
Registered electors		5,615		
Labour gain from Liberal Democrats				
Labour gain from Liberal Democrats				
Labour gain from Liberal Democrats				

=== Highfield ===
Highfield (3 seats)
Party	Candidate	Votes	%	±%
Labour	P. Doyle*	959	46.8	+10.6
Labour	P. Camp	786	38.3	+9.6
Liberal Democrats	G. Lawrence*	726	35.4	–5.4
Labour	M. Presland	676	33.0	+5.1
Liberal Democrats	A. King	613	29.9	–5.0
Liberal Democrats	J. Penny	568	27.7	–7.0
Conservative	G. Hanson	430	21.0	–3.4
Conservative	D. Stevenson	349	17.0	–6.7
Conservative	D. Stevenson	322	15.7	–6.5
Turnout		~2,051	45.9	–8.7
Registered electors		4,469		
Labour hold				
Labour gain from Liberal Democrats				
Liberal Democrats hold				

=== Kings Langley ===
Kings Langley (2 seats)
Party	Candidate	Votes	%	±%
Conservative	J. Greene*	964	53.4	+1.8
Conservative	D. Walker*	901	49.9	+1.5
Labour	P. Gale	545	30.2	+15.9
Labour	D. Lane	444	24.6	+10.7
Liberal Democrats	I. Senior	321	17.8	–16.4
Liberal Democrats	R. Kelly	284	15.7	–18.5
Turnout		~1,805	48.9	–10.1
Registered electors		3,691		
Conservative hold				
Conservative hold				

=== Leverstock Green ===
Leverstock Green (3 seats)
Party	Candidate	Votes	%	±%
Conservative	H. Bassadone*	1,405	55.0	+4.0
Conservative	C. Cadman*	1,320	51.7	+3.9
Conservative	J. Hanson*	1,300	50.9	+4.2
Labour	R. Hebborn	703	27.5	+10.8
Labour	R. Hebborn	690	27.0	+10.6
Labour	B. Rubin	617	24.2	+8.2
Liberal Democrats	R. Cottrell	434	17.0	–14.4
Liberal Democrats	S. Watkin	417	16.3	–14.5
Liberal Democrats	M. Rogers	375	14.7	–15.1
Turnout		~2,554	48.9	–6.3
Registered electors		5,223		
Conservative hold				
Conservative hold				
Conservative hold				

=== Nash Mills ===
Nash Mills
Party	Candidate	Votes	%	±%
Conservative	H. Korman*	517	54.0	+6.4
Labour	C. Bullen	308	32.2	–3.6
Liberal Democrats	R. Willson	132	13.8	–2.8
Majority		209	21.8	+10.0
Turnout		957	58.1	–6.1
Registered electors		1,653		
Conservative hold		Swing	▲5.0	

=== Northchurch ===
Northchurch
Party	Candidate	Votes	%	±%
Conservative	J. Peel	578	58.7	–11.8
Liberal Democrats	K. Patterson	211	21.4	–0.3
Labour	S. Tupper	120	12.2	+4.5
Green	S. Duffield	75	7.6	N/A
Majority		367	37.3	–11.5
Turnout		984	48.4	–1.5
Registered electors		2,088		
Conservative hold		Swing	▼5.8	

=== South ===
South
Party	Candidate	Votes	%	±%
Conservative	P. Beale	871	61.4	+2.5
Labour	D. Leathwood	282	19.9	+7.1
Liberal Democrats	L. Roe	265	18.7	–9.6
Majority		589	41.5	+10.9
Turnout		1,418	47.8	–4.3
Registered electors		2,967		
Conservative hold		Swing	▼2.3	

=== Tring Central ===
Tring Central (2 seats)
Party	Candidate	Votes	%	±%
Conservative	P. Noel	844	42.8	–3.5
Conservative	M. Jackson	733	37.1	–7.6
Liberal Democrats	B. Batchelor	709	35.9	–2.6
Liberal Democrats	D. Rance	557	28.2	–8.7
Green	D. Metcalfe	403	20.4	N/A
Labour	M. Fountain	259	13.1	–1.6
Labour	L. Maple	222	11.2	–1.4
Turnout		~1,974	48.7	–5.2
Registered electors		4,053		
Conservative hold				
Conservative hold				

=== Tring East ===
Tring East
Party	Candidate	Votes	%	±%
Conservative	J. Jameson*	650	66.1	+5.5
Liberal Democrats	N. Hollinghurst	198	20.1	–13.6
Labour	P. Carter	72	7.3	+1.6
Green	C. Kruger	63	6.4	N/A
Majority		452	46.0	+19.1
Turnout		983	58.8	–8.0
Registered electors		1,703		
Conservative hold		Swing	▲9.6	

=== Tring West ===
Tring West (2 seats)
Party	Candidate	Votes	%	±%
Conservative	D. Townsend*	992	52.4	–5.4
Conservative	M. Arnold*	982	51.9	+1.7
Green	P. Metcalfe	374	19.8	N/A
Labour	R. Dickenson	358	18.9	+2.2
Liberal Democrats	E. Williams	335	17.7	–10.7
Labour	R. Lovelace	308	18.9	+2.2
Liberal Democrats	J. Davis	265	14.0	–9.2
Turnout		~1,892	51.9	–6.6
Registered electors		3,645		
Conservative hold				
Conservative hold				

=== Warners End ===
Warners End (3 seats)
Party	Candidate	Votes	%	±%
Liberal Democrats	J. Sweetingham*	837	33.4	–1.2
Labour	J. Coleman	834	33.3	+3.2
Labour	M. Coxage	818	32.7	+3.4
Liberal Democrats	E. Willis*	794	31.7	–2.6
Labour	I. Laidlaw-Dickson	791	31.6	+3.2
Liberal Democrats	B. Phillips	766	30.6	–1.9
Conservative	A. Kelly*	742	29.6	–2.7
Conservative	M. Luck	694	27.7	–4.2
Conservative	G. Odell	662	26.4	–3.7
Turnout		~2,503	54.0	–3.9
Registered electors		4,636		
Liberal Democrats hold				
Labour gain from Liberal Democrats				
Labour gain from Liberal Democrats				
