= 2015 Dacorum Borough Council election =

2015 UK local government election

- 7 May 2015

All 51 seats to Dacorum Borough Council 26 seats needed for a majority

| | First party | Second party | Third party |
|---|---|---|---|
| Party | Conservative | Liberal Democrats | Labour |
| Seats won | 46 | 3 | 2 |
| Seat change | ▲3 | ▼3 | Steady |
| Popular vote | 75,674 | 21,195 | 23,447 |
| Percentage | 53.8% | 15.1% | 16.7% |
| Swing | ▼0.1% | ▼2.9% | ▼8.7% |
- Winner of each seat at the 2015 Dacorum Borough Council election.
Control before election
Conservative
Control after election
Conservative

The 2015 Dacorum Borough Council election took place on 7 May 2015 to elect members of Dacorum Borough Council in Hertfordshire, England. This was on the same day as the 2015 general election and other local elections.

== Summary ==
=== Election result ===
2015 Dacorum Borough Council election
| Party | Candidates | Seats | Gains | Losses | Net gain/loss | Seats % | Votes % | Votes | +/− |
|---|---|---|---|---|---|---|---|---|---|
| Conservative | 51 | 46 | 4 | 1 | ▲3 | 90.2 | 53.8 | 75,674 | –0.1 |
| Liberal Democrats | 43 | 3 | 1 | 4 | ▼3 | 5.9 | 15.1 | 21,195 | –2.9 |
| Labour | 35 | 2 | 2 | 2 | Steady | 3.9 | 16.7 | 23,447 | –8.7 |
| UKIP | 16 | 0 | 0 | 0 | Steady | 0.0 | 7.8 | 11,004 | N/A |
| Green | 21 | 0 | 0 | 0 | Steady | 0.0 | 6.5 | 9,158 | +4.6 |
| Independent | 2 | 0 | 0 | 0 | Steady | 0.0 | 0.2 | 276 | –0.3 |

== Ward results ==
Incumbent councillors standing for re-election are marked with an asterisk (*). Changes in seats do not take into account by-elections or defections.

=== Adeyfield East ===
Adeyfield East (2 seats)
| Party | Candidate | Votes | % | ±% |
|---|---|---|---|---|
| Conservative | Graham Adshead | 1,037 | 42.0 | –10.7 |
| Conservative | William Wyatt-Lowe* | 1,021 | 41.4 | –9.0 |
| Labour | Michael Moore | 649 | 26.3 | –5.3 |
| UKIP | Noel Swinford | 569 | 23.1 | N/A |
| Labour | Peter Scott | 407 | 16.5 | –10.2 |
| Green | Sam Deering | 186 | 7.5 | +0.5 |
| Liberal Democrats | Adrian England | 152 | 6.2 | –2.5 |
| Liberal Democrats | Joe Toovey | 101 | 4.1 | –3.3 |
| Turnout | | 2,467 | 61.8 | +24.6 |
| Registered electors | | 3,991 | | |
| Conservative hold | | | | |
| Conservative hold | | | | |

=== Adeyfield West ===
Adeyfield West (2 seats)
| Party | Candidate | Votes | % | ±% |
|---|---|---|---|---|
| Conservative | Sharon Adshead | 763 | 28.9 | –10.8 |
| Liberal Democrats | Ron Tindall | 715 | 27.1 | +13.7 |
| Conservative | Tony Gallagher | 706 | 26.8 | –11.3 |
| UKIP | Martyn Adams | 672 | 25.5 | N/A |
| Liberal Democrats | Stephen Wilson | 463 | 17.6 | +4.5 |
| Labour | Zahoor Iqbal | 450 | 17.1 | –22.1 |
| Turnout | | 2,637 | 62.1 | +24.6 |
| Registered electors | | 4,245 | | |
| Conservative hold | | | | |
| Liberal Democrats gain from Labour | | | | |

=== Aldbury & Wigginton ===
Aldbury & Wigginton
| Party | Candidate | Votes | % | ±% |
|---|---|---|---|---|
| Conservative | Stan Mills | 642 | 43.8 | +3.5 |
| Liberal Democrats | Rosemarie Hollinghurst* | 596 | 40.7 | –12.0 |
| Green | Charlotte Pardy | 129 | 8.8 | N/A |
| Labour | Timothy Perkins | 98 | 6.7 | –0.3 |
| Majority | | 46 | 3.1 | N/A |
| Turnout | | 1,465 | 76.3 | +18.3 |
| Registered electors | | 1,919 | | |
| Conservative gain from Liberal Democrats | | Swing | ▲7.8 | |

=== Ashridge ===
Ashridge
| Party | Candidate | Votes | % | ±% |
|---|---|---|---|---|
| Conservative | Terry Douris | 1,281 | 73.6 | –2.5 |
| Labour | Samira Hotobah-During | 201 | 11.5 | –1.1 |
| Liberal Democrats | Margaret Colquhoun | 148 | 8.5 | –2.8 |
| Green | Terri Bailey | 111 | 6.4 | N/A |
| Majority | | 1,080 | 62.1 | –1.4 |
| Turnout | | 1,741 | 79.3 | +23.5 |
| Registered electors | | 2,195 | | |
| Conservative hold | | Swing | ▼0.7 | |

=== Apsley & Corner Hall ===
Apsley & Corner Hall (3 seats)
| Party | Candidate | Votes | % | ±% |
|---|---|---|---|---|
| Conservative | Colin Peter* | 1,685 | 35.3 | –20.8 |
| Conservative | Tina Howard | 1,637 | 34.3 | –12.8 |
| Conservative | Michael Clark* | 1,518 | 31.8 | –12.7 |
| Labour | Matthew Carter | 1,084 | 22.7 | –6.5 |
| Labour | Norman Jones | 1,047 | 21.9 | –5.4 |
| UKIP | John Eardley | 1,001 | 21.0 | N/A |
| Green | Tom Hart-Shea | 739 | 15.5 | N/A |
| Liberal Democrats | David Bird | 671 | 14.0 | +1.3 |
| Turnout | | 4,776 | 71.9 | +36.4 |
| Registered electors | | 6,638 | | |
| Conservative hold | | | | |
| Conservative hold | | | | |
| Conservative hold | | | | |

=== Bennetts End ===
Bennetts End (2 seats)
| Party | Candidate | Votes | % | ±% |
|---|---|---|---|---|
| Conservative | John Birnie | 1,193 | 38.9 | –1.0 |
| Conservative | Suqlain Mahmood* | 1,014 | 33.1 | –3.3 |
| Labour | Mohammad Malik | 889 | 29.0 | –4.8 |
| Labour | Mandy Tattershall | 824 | 26.9 | –2.4 |
| UKIP | Alan Goodman | 701 | 22.9 | N/A |
| Green | Sofiya Ahmed | 281 | 9.2 | N/A |
| Liberal Democrats | Lynda Roe | 229 | 7.5 | –4.5 |
| Independent | Nigel Nutkins | 141 | 4.6 | N/A |
| Turnout | | 3,065 | 66.3 | +27.7 |
| Registered electors | | 4,625 | | |
| Conservative hold | | | | |
| Conservative hold | | | | |

=== Berkhamsted Castle ===
Berkhamsted Castle (2 seats)
| Party | Candidate | Votes | % | ±% |
|---|---|---|---|---|
| Conservative | David Collins* | 1,933 | 53.7 | +0.7 |
| Conservative | Tom Ritchie | 1,682 | 46.7 | –4.7 |
| Liberal Democrats | Freda Earl | 1,154 | 32.1 | –1.6 |
| Green | Paul Gregory De Hoest | 819 | 22.8 | N/A |
| Liberal Democrats | Andrew Horton | 652 | 18.1 | –7.1 |
| Turnout | | 3,599 | 76.0 | +25.1 |
| Registered electors | | 4,733 | | |
| Conservative hold | | | | |
| Conservative hold | | | | |

=== Berkhamsted East ===
Berkhamsted East (2 seats)
| Party | Candidate | Votes | % | ±% |
|---|---|---|---|---|
| Conservative | Elaine Collins | 1,482 | 43.7 | –1.8 |
| Conservative | Stephen Bateman* | 1,438 | 42.4 | +1.2 |
| Liberal Democrats | Garrick Stevens | 1,008 | 29.7 | –1.3 |
| Labour | Gwendoline Scott | 655 | 19.3 | +4.4 |
| Liberal Democrats | Gordon Yearwood | 655 | 19.3 | –8.0 |
| Green | Paul Harris | 517 | 15.2 | N/A |
| Labour | Dominic Hook | 465 | 13.7 | –0.2 |
| Turnout | | 3,392 | 73.5 | +25.4 |
| Registered electors | | 4,612 | | |
| Conservative hold | | | | |
| Conservative hold | | | | |

=== Berkhamsted West ===
Berkhamsted West (2 seats)
| Party | Candidate | Votes | % | ±% |
|---|---|---|---|---|
| Conservative | Julian Ashbourn | 1,697 | 51.6 | –0.6 |
| Conservative | Peter Matthews | 1,591 | 48.3 | –3.3 |
| Liberal Democrats | Geraldine Corry | 616 | 18.7 | –5.3 |
| Labour | Peter Jones | 554 | 16.8 | –0.4 |
| Liberal Democrats | Peter Holditch | 507 | 15.4 | –3.1 |
| Green | Mary Hardinge | 442 | 13.4 | +1.0 |
| Labour | Alexander Matthews | 419 | 12.7 | –0.9 |
| Turnout | | 3,294 | 71.9 | +23.6 |
| Registered electors | | 4,584 | | |
| Conservative hold | | | | |
| Conservative hold | | | | |

=== Bovingdon, Flaunden & Chipperfield ===
Bovingdon, Flaunden & Chipperfield (3 seats)
| Party | Candidate | Votes | % | ±% |
|---|---|---|---|---|
| Conservative | Adam Barnes | 3,090 | 64.2 | –5.7 |
| Conservative | Stewart Riddick | 2,827 | 58.8 | –5.0 |
| Conservative | Gbola Adeleke* | 2,772 | 57.6 | –1.8 |
| Green | Wiebke Carr | 933 | 19.4 | +7.6 |
| Labour | Beryl Milnes | 714 | 14.8 | +0.5 |
| Labour | Richard Milnes | 650 | 13.5 | –0.7 |
| Liberal Democrats | Gloria Crellin | 520 | 10.8 | +1.3 |
| Liberal Democrats | Paul Elley | 400 | 8.3 | +0.3 |
| Liberal Democrats | Malcolm Rogers | 344 | 7.2 | –0.3 |
| Turnout | | 4,810 | 72.8 | +25.4 |
| Registered electors | | 6,610 | | |
| Conservative hold | | | | |
| Conservative hold | | | | |
| Conservative hold | | | | |

=== Boxmoor ===
Boxmoor (3 seats)
| Party | Candidate | Votes | % | ±% |
|---|---|---|---|---|
| Conservative | Janice Marshall* | 2,355 | 47.9 | –6.2 |
| Conservative | Neil Harden* | 2,032 | 41.4 | –11.6 |
| Conservative | Andrew Williams* | 1,876 | 38.2 | –10.2 |
| UKIP | Vic Cole | 1,200 | 24.4 | N/A |
| Labour | Ian Laidlaw-Dickson | 1,035 | 21.1 | –5.3 |
| Liberal Democrats | John Allen | 849 | 17.3 | +1.1 |
| Green | Sherief Mamoun Hassan | 831 | 16.9 | +8.3 |
| Labour | Julia Coleman | 778 | 15.8 | –8.1 |
| Liberal Democrats | Christopher Angell | 601 | 12.2 | +3.3 |
| UKIP | Christopher Wright | 522 | 10.6 | N/A |
| Turnout | | 4,913 | 71.8 | +23.5 |
| Registered electors | | 6,848 | | |
| Conservative hold | | | | |
| Conservative hold | | | | |
| Conservative hold | | | | |

=== Chauldon & Warners End ===
Chauldon & Warners End (3 seats)
| Party | Candidate | Votes | % | ±% |
|---|---|---|---|---|
| Conservative | Fiona Guest* | 2,002 | 43.0 | –2.5 |
| Conservative | John Whitman* | 1,921 | 41.2 | –2.2 |
| Conservative | Graeme Elliot | 1,863 | 40.0 | –3.1 |
| Labour | Margaret Coxage | 1,191 | 25.6 | –12.1 |
| UKIP | Anne-Marie Bacon | 1,079 | 23.2 | N/A |
| Labour | Ron Coxage | 1,066 | 22.9 | –11.4 |
| Labour | Michael Bromberg | 1,025 | 22.0 | –12.3 |
| Green | Jane Cousins | 507 | 10.9 | –1.1 |
| Liberal Democrats | Jennifer Simmons | 367 | 7.9 | 1.4 |
| Liberal Democrats | Diane Wilson | 317 | 6.8 | –0.4 |
| Liberal Democrats | Beth Townsend | 178 | 3.8 | –2.4 |
| Turnout | | 4,658 | 67.6 | +22.4 |
| Registered electors | | 6,888 | | |
| Conservative hold | | | | |
| Conservative hold | | | | |
| Conservative hold | | | | |

=== Gadebridge ===
Gadebridge (2 seats)
| Party | Candidate | Votes | % | ±% |
|---|---|---|---|---|
| Conservative | Roger Taylor* | 1,120 | 41.1 | +3.1 |
| Conservative | Isy Imarni | 921 | 33.8 | +1.4 |
| Labour | Vanessa Mitchell | 702 | 25.8 | –18.8 |
| Labour | Angela Terry | 635 | 23.3 | –12.9 |
| UKIP | James Froggatt | 595 | 21.8 | N/A |
| Green | Suzanne Watts | 226 | 8.3 | +2.5 |
| Liberal Democrats | Stuart Watkin | 137 | 5.0 | –1.7 |
| Independent | Brian Hall | 125 | 4.6 | N/A |
| Liberal Democrats | Frances Turan | 86 | 3.2 | –1.7 |
| Turnout | | 2,724 | 66.0 | +21.3 |
| Registered electors | | 4,130 | | |
| Conservative hold | | | | |
| Conservative gain from Labour | | | | |

=== Grovehill ===
Grovehill (3 seats)
| Party | Candidate | Votes | % | ±% |
|---|---|---|---|---|
| Conservative | Julie Banks | 1,535 | 44.6 | –5.4 |
| Conservative | Alex Bhinder | 1,424 | 41.4 | –3.7 |
| Conservative | Goverdhan Silwal | 1,142 | 33.2 | –11.4 |
| UKIP | Karen Hall | 996 | 29.0 | N/A |
| Labour | Dawn Green | 860 | 25.0 | –10.9 |
| Labour | Jean Langdon | 782 | 22.7 | –7.1 |
| Green | Paul Sandford | 417 | 12.1 | +3.7 |
| Liberal Democrats | Geoff Lawrence | 293 | 8.5 | +1.0 |
| Liberal Democrats | Martin Rance | 168 | 4.9 | –2.1 |
| Turnout | | 3,440 | 60.4 | +23.9 |
| Registered electors | | 5,696 | | |
| Conservative hold | | | | |
| Conservative hold | | | | |
| Conservative hold | | | | |

=== Hemel Hempstead Town ===
Hemel Hempstead Town (2 seats)
| Party | Candidate | Votes | % | ±% |
|---|---|---|---|---|
| Conservative | Christina Brown | 998 | 40.2 | –0.1 |
| Labour | Anne Fisher | 790 | 31.8 | –5.8 |
| Conservative | Sanjay Jamuar | 746 | 30.0 | –8.7 |
| Labour | Stefan Fisher | 696 | 28.0 | –8.6 |
| UKIP | Howard Koch | 442 | 17.8 | N/A |
| Liberal Democrats | Angela Tindall | 287 | 11.6 | –5.4 |
| Liberal Democrats | Rob Irving | 239 | 9.6 | –5.5 |
| Turnout | | 2,484 | 58.2 | +23.3 |
| Registered electors | | 4,270 | | |
| Conservative hold | | | | |
| Labour gain from Conservative | | | | |

=== Highfield ===
Highfield (2 seats)
| Party | Candidate | Votes | % | ±% |
|---|---|---|---|---|
| Labour | Tony Fethney | 706 | 28.4 | –4.7 |
| Liberal Democrats | Brenda Link* | 684 | 27.5 | –14.4 |
| UKIP | Elena Naidoo | 632 | 25.4 | N/A |
| Conservative | Adam Wyatt-Lowe | 568 | 22.8 | –1.1 |
| Conservative | Christopher Griffiths | 561 | 22.6 | +4.4 |
| Liberal Democrats | Stuart Pope | 448 | 18.0 | –26.7 |
| Green | Ky Wilkinson | 230 | 9.3 | N/A |
| Turnout | | 2,486 | 59.8 | =19.2 |
| Registered electors | | 4,161 | | |
| Labour gain from Liberal Democrats | | | | |
| Liberal Democrats hold | | | | |

=== Kings Langley ===
Kings Langley (2 seats)
| Party | Candidate | Votes | % | ±% |
|---|---|---|---|---|
| Conservative | Alan Anderson* | 1,713 | 56.7 | –6.0 |
| Conservative | Robert McLean* | 1,438 | 47.6 | –8.7 |
| Labour | Gerald Angiolini | 782 | 25.9 | +0.6 |
| Green | Victoria Bate | 573 | 18.9 | N/A |
| Liberal Democrats | Ian Senior | 471 | 15.6 | +1.2 |
| Turnout | | 3,023 | 73.1 | +24.4 |
| Registered electors | | 4,137 | | |
| Conservative hold | | | | |
| Conservative hold | | | | |

=== Leverstock Green ===
Leverstock Green (3 seats)
| Party | Candidate | Votes | % | ±% |
|---|---|---|---|---|
| Conservative | Hazel Bassadone* | 2,493 | 52.0 | –9.3 |
| Conservative | Graham Sutton* | 2,052 | 42.8 | –11.9 |
| Conservative | Margaret Griffiths* | 1,865 | 38.9 | –14.8 |
| Labour | Lee Whitehall | 1,230 | 25.6 | +0.1 |
| UKIP | Rachel Catherine Biggs | 1,095 | 22.8 | N/A |
| Green | Angela May Lynch | 777 | 16.2 | N/A |
| Liberal Democrats | Sheila Daly | 740 | 15.4 | +2.1 |
| Turnout | | 4,797 | 68.1 | +25.4 |
| Registered electors | | 7,045 | | |
| Conservative hold | | | | |
| Conservative hold | | | | |
| Conservative hold | | | | |

=== Nash Mills ===
Nash Mills
| Party | Candidate | Votes | % | ±% |
|---|---|---|---|---|
| Conservative | Jan Maddern | 846 | 51.3 | –14.3 |
| Labour | Bernard Gronert | 385 | 23.3 | –0.4 |
| UKIP | Gillian Adams | 242 | 14.7 | N/A |
| Liberal Democrats | Alan Waugh | 92 | 5.6 | –5.1 |
| Green | Gail Gregory | 85 | 5.2 | N/A |
| Majority | | 461 | 28.0 | –13.9 |
| Turnout | | 1,650 | 67.2 | +23.5 |
| Registered electors | | 2,456 | | |
| Conservative hold | | Swing | ▼7.0 | |

=== Northchurch ===
Northchurch
| Party | Candidate | Votes | % | ±% |
|---|---|---|---|---|
| Conservative | Alan Fantham* | 980 | 60.3 | –8.3 |
| Liberal Democrats | Mark Somervail | 305 | 18.8 | +1.0 |
| Labour | Jody Whitehill | 199 | 12.2 | –1.3 |
| Green | Ian Bell | 141 | 8.7 | N/A |
| Majority | | 675 | 41.5 | –9.3 |
| Turnout | | 1,625 | 73.7 | +25.0 |
| Registered electors | | 2,205 | | |
| Conservative hold | | Swing | ▼4.7 | |

=== Tring Central ===
Tring Central (2 seats)
| Party | Candidate | Votes | % | ±% |
|---|---|---|---|---|
| Conservative | Stephen Hearn | 1,344 | 47.3 | +6.6 |
| Liberal Democrats | Roxanne Ransley | 1,083 | 38.1 | –13.4 |
| Conservative | Phil Hills | 1,071 | 37.7 | +6.7 |
| Liberal Democrats | John Bowden | 1,033 | 36.4 | –11.5 |
| Green | Kevin Fielding | 444 | 15.6 | N/A |
| Turnout | | 2,839 | 71.0 | +24.2 |
| Registered electors | | 3,998 | | |
| Conservative gain from Liberal Democrats | | | | |
| Liberal Democrats hold | | | | |

=== Tring East ===
Tring East
| Party | Candidate | Votes | % | ±% |
|---|---|---|---|---|
| Conservative | Penny Hearn* | 904 | 53.2 | +0.7 |
| Liberal Democrats | Denise Rance | 604 | 35.6 | –4.6 |
| UKIP | Mark Anderson | 191 | 11.2 | N/A |
| Majority | | 300 | 17.6 | +5.3 |
| Turnout | | 1,699 | 77.4 | +17.7 |
| Registered electors | | 2,196 | | |
| Conservative hold | | Swing | ▲2.7 | |

=== Tring West & Rural ===
Tring West & Rural (2 seats)
| Party | Candidate | Votes | % | ±% |
|---|---|---|---|---|
| Conservative | Olive Conway* | 1,244 | 39.6 | –3.1 |
| Conservative | Mike Hicks | 1,162 | 37.0 | –1.8 |
| Liberal Democrats | Nicholas Hollinghurst | 1,076 | 34.2 | –12.0 |
| Liberal Democrats | Christopher Townsend* | 859 | 27.3 | –13.1 |
| UKIP | Amy Anderson | 419 | 13.3 | N/A |
| Green | Roger Oliver | 400 | 12.7 | N/A |
| Labour | Emma Reed | 313 | 10.0 | ±0.0 |
| Labour | Sylvia Shaw | 209 | 6.7 | –3.0 |
| Turnout | | 3,145 | 75.4 | +22.2 |
| Registered electors | | 4,172 | | |
| Conservative hold | | | | |
| Conservative gain from Liberal Democrats | | | | |

=== Watling ===
Watling (2 seats)
| Party | Candidate | Votes | % | ±% |
|---|---|---|---|---|
| Conservative | Herbert Chapman* | 1,910 | 62.3 | –2.8 |
| Conservative | Jane Timmis | 1,713 | 55.9 | –6.1 |
| Labour | Gillian Edwards | 570 | 18.6 | +1.9 |
| Labour | Sandra Palmer | 387 | 12.6 | +0.3 |
| Liberal Democrats | Helen Irving | 301 | 9.8 | –4.2 |
| Liberal Democrats | Margaret Waugh | 216 | 7.0 | +1.0 |
| Turnout | | 3,065 | 71.0 | +26.5 |
| Registered electors | | 4,317 | | |
| Conservative hold | | | | |
| Conservative hold | | | | |

=== Woodhall Farm ===
Woodhall Farm (2 seats)
| Party | Candidate | Votes | % | ±% |
|---|---|---|---|---|
| Conservative | Colette Wyatt-Lowe* | 1,457 | 54.9 | –7.3 |
| Conservative | Rosie Sutton | 1,409 | 53.1 | –5.9 |
| UKIP | Steven Jones | 648 | 24.4 | N/A |
| Liberal Democrats | Arno Andreasen | 489 | 18.4 | +9.0 |
| Green | Bernard Hurley | 370 | 14.0 | N/A |
| Liberal Democrats | Lloyd Harris | 341 | 12.9 | +5.7 |
| Turnout | | 2,653 | 62.8 | +26.0 |
| Registered electors | | 4,227 | | |
| Conservative hold | | | | |
| Conservative hold | | | | |
