= 1976 Dacorum District Council election =

1976 English local election

- 6 May 1976

All 62 seats to Dacorum District Council 32 seats needed for a majority

	First party	Second party	Third party
Party	Conservative	Labour	Independent
Seats won	38	21	3
Seat change	▲13	▼12	▼1
Popular vote	84,532	60,646	4,212
Percentage	52.6%	37.8%	2.6%
Swing	▲9.8%	▼9.4%	▼1.8%
Control before election
Labour
Control after election
Conservative

The 1976 Dacorum District Council election took place on 6 May 1976 to elect members of Dacorum District Council in Hertfordshire, England. This was on the same day as other local elections.

== Summary ==
=== Election result ===
1976 Dacorum District Council election
Party	Candidates	Seats	Gains	Losses	Net gain/loss	Seats %	Votes %	Votes	+/−
Conservative	62	38	14	1	▲13	61.3	52.6	84,532	+9.8
Labour	56	21	0	12	▼12	33.9	37.8	60,646	–9.4
Independent	5	3	1	2	▼1	4.8	2.6	4,212	–1.8
Liberal	22	0	0	0	Steady	0.0	6.1	9,765	+1.5
Communist	6	0	0	0	Steady	0.0	0.4	644	–0.6
National Front	3	0	0	0	Steady	0.0	0.3	427	N/A
Independent Liberal	1	0	0	0	Steady	0.0	0.2	335	N/A

== Ward results ==
Incumbent councillors standing for re-election are marked with an asterisk (*). Changes in seats do not take into account by-elections or defections.

=== Bovingdon & Flaunden ===
Bovingdon & Flaunden (2 seats)
Party	Candidate	Votes	%	±%
Conservative	R. Lown*	841	55.0	+21.9
Conservative	P. Mayo	820	53.7	N/A
Independent	W. Symons	369	24.1	N/A
Labour	T. Latton	318	20.8	–9.8
Labour	M. Smith	279	18.3	–9.4
Turnout		~1,528	58.6	+7.2
Registered electors		2,608		
Conservative hold				
Conservative gain from Independent				

=== Chipperfield ===
Chipperfield
Party	Candidate	Votes	%	±%
Conservative	J. Nichols	419	47.2	–30.2
Liberal	I. Senior	416	46.9	N/A
Labour	D. Moss	52	5.9	–16.7
Majority		3	0.3	–54.5
Turnout		887	71.2	+39.9
Registered electors		1,245		
Conservative hold				

=== Kings Langley ===
Kings Langley (2 seats)
Party	Candidate	Votes	%	±%
Conservative	W. Driver*	1,255	70.5	+15.6
Conservative	A. Scott	1,199	67.4	+17.1
Labour	H. Leather	525	29.5	–15.6
Labour	S. Kahn	484	27.2	–16.4
Turnout		~1,779	51.7	+7.7
Registered electors		3,441		
Conservative hold				
Conservative hold				

=== No. 1 (Hemel Hempstead: Central) ===
No. 1 (Hemel Hempstead: Central) (3 seats)
Party	Candidate	Votes	%	±%
Conservative	C. Appleby	1,008	68.1	+25.0
Conservative	C. Fowler*	998	67.4	+24.7
Conservative	A. Toms*	981	66.3	+25.4
Labour	I. Gibson	391	26.4	–0.5
Labour	M. Kalaher	360	24.3	–1.1
Labour	K. Lewis	358	24.2	N/A
Communist	J. Belcher	80	5.4	+2.8
Turnout		~1,481	40.5	–5.6
Registered electors		3,656		
Conservative hold				
Conservative hold				
Conservative hold				

=== No. 2 (Hemel Hempstead: Northeast) ===
No. 2 (Hemel Hempstead: Northeast) (7 seats)
Party	Candidate	Votes	%	±%
Labour	A. Hooper	1,993	45.2	–16.7
Labour	J. Annison	1,986	45.0	–16.8
Labour	P. Doyle	1,963	44.5	–15.3
Labour	O. Taylor*	1,930	43.8	–15.3
Labour	L. Field	1,902	43.1	–14.8
Labour	R. Beresford	1,901	43.1	–14.8
Labour	P. Palfrey	1,877	42.6	–14.4
Conservative	E. Cooper	1,810	41.0	+10.1
Conservative	C. Abbott	1,789	40.6	+11.7
Conservative	G. Clennell	1,771	40.1	+11.7
Conservative	M. Cosgrave	1,738	39.4	+11.1
Conservative	G. Hanson	1,731	39.2	+10.9
Conservative	E. Feltham	1,721	39.0	+10.8
Conservative	J. Wood	1,719	39.0	+11.2
Liberal	G. Lawrence	612	13.9	N/A
Liberal	A. Allen	568	12.9	N/A
Liberal	J. Blackman	559	12.7	N/A
Liberal	R. Coles	532	12.1	N/A
Liberal	W. Stuart	485	11.0	N/A
Liberal	K. Williams	476	10.8	N/A
Liberal	A. Smith	471	10.7	N/A
Turnout		~4,411	40.4	+14.6
Registered electors		10,919		
Labour hold				
Labour hold				
Labour hold				
Labour hold				
Labour hold				
Labour hold				
Labour hold				

=== No. 3 (Hemel Hempstead: Adeyfield) ===
No. 3 (Hemel Hempstead: Adeyfield) (4 seats)
Party	Candidate	Votes	%	±%
Labour	L. Taber*	1,381	48.8	–18.5
Labour	G. Scribens*	1,350	47.7	–18.4
Labour	G. Keegan	1,345	47.5	–18.0
Labour	H. Coffman	1,293	45.7	–18.4
Conservative	D. Harrington	1,007	35.6	+10.1
Conservative	W. Evans	1,006	35.5	+10.9
Conservative	L. Oldrey	1,005	35.5	+12.1
Conservative	H. Marwood	934	33.0	+9.7
Liberal	L. Hanson	333	11.8	N/A
Liberal	G. White	246	8.7	N/A
Communist	J. Marshall	109	3.9	–2.7
Turnout		~2,830	51.8	+22.3
Registered electors		5,463		
Labour hold				
Labour hold				
Labour hold				
Labour hold				

=== No. 4 (Hemel Hempstead: Southeast) ===
No. 4 (Hemel Hempstead: Southeast) (6 seats)
Party	Candidate	Votes	%	±%
Conservative	J. Price	2,179	51.6	+14.0
Conservative	P. Courtnage	2,130	50.5	+13.5
Conservative	K. Coleman	2,101	49.8	+13.2
Conservative	H. Bassadone	2,098	49.7	+13.3
Conservative	J. Phillips	2,080	49.3	+12.9
Conservative	R. Foord-Kelcey	2,040	48.3	+12.5
Labour	C. De Peyer*	1,878	44.5	–11.5
Labour	J. Lucas	1,861	44.1	–11.7
Labour	J. Lucas	1,861	44.1	–10.3
Labour	R. Ryan	1,698	40.2	–14.2
Labour	M. Trainin	1,687	40.0	–13.6
Labour	W. Price	1,686	40.0	–13.4
Communist	A. Wigmore	165	3.9	N/A
Turnout		~4,219	48.7	+13.5
Registered electors		8,664		
Conservative gain from Labour				
Conservative gain from Labour				
Conservative gain from Labour				
Conservative gain from Labour				
Conservative gain from Labour				
Conservative gain from Labour				

=== No. 5 (Hemel Hempstead: Apsley & Abbots Langley) ===
No. 5 (Hemel Hempstead: Apsley & Abbots Langley) (5 seats)
Party	Candidate	Votes	%	±%
Labour	S. Davison	1,730	43.3	+1.6
Labour	J. Dorchester	1,653	41.3	+0.3
Labour	F. McDonnell	1,608	40.2	–0.5
Labour	A. Maclaughlin	1,605	40.1	±0.0
Conservative	C. Barling	1,583	39.6	+1.0
Labour	D. Southall	1,540	38.5	+0.4
Conservative	T. Eastman	1,535	38.4	+0.4
Conservative	G. Badley	1,525	38.1	+0.3
Conservative	B. Langdon-Pratt	1,509	37.7	+1.1
Conservative	B. Gandy	1,496	37.4	+1.8
Liberal	M. Crofts	464	11.6	N/A
Liberal	C. Kennard	419	10.5	N/A
Liberal	B. Rigby	408	10.2	N/A
Liberal	S. Palmer	379	9.5	N/A
National Front	P. Cull	164	4.1	N/A
National Front	J. Griggs	143	3.6	N/A
National Front	A. Piears	120	3.0	N/A
Communist	B. Rubin	58	1.5	–6.5
Turnout		~3,999	55.4	+15.0
Registered electors		7,218		
Labour hold				
Labour hold				
Labour hold				
Labour hold				
Conservative hold				

=== No. 7 (Hemel Hempstead: Boxmoor) ===
No. 7 (Hemel Hempstead: Boxmoor) (4 seats)
Party	Candidate	Votes	%	±%
Conservative	M. King	1,775	51.7	+16.2
Conservative	J. Buteux	1,754	51.1	+17.0
Conservative	A. Barling	1,741	50.7	+18.0
Conservative	B. Luck	1,677	48.9	+17.6
Labour	D. Brown*	1,512	44.1	+1.9
Labour	D. Holdsworth*	1,439	41.9	±0.0
Labour	J. Johnson*	1,408	41.0	+0.3
Labour	I. Laidlaw-Dickson	1,273	37.1	–3.1
Communist	E. Leigh	145	4.2	–1.3
Turnout		~3,432	54.5	+0.1
Registered electors		6,298		
Conservative gain from Labour				
Conservative gain from Labour				
Conservative gain from Labour				
Conservative gain from Labour				

=== No. 8 (Hemel Hempstead: Warners End) ===
No. 8 (Hemel Hempstead: Warners End) (4 seats)
Party	Candidate	Votes	%	±%
Labour	J. Geraghty*	1,232	46.9	–17.8
Labour	G. Mitchell	1,191	45.3	–16.1
Labour	C. Harris	1,132	43.1	–16.0
Labour	M. Young	1,112	42.3	–15.2
Conservative	A. Priestley	1,053	40.1	+11.0
Conservative	J. Fagan	1,052	40.0	+11.0
Conservative	E. Bird	1,042	39.6	+12.3
Conservative	A. Ehrlich	1,034	39.3	+12.7
Liberal	W. Whalley	257	9.8	N/A
Liberal	J. Freeman	255	9.7	N/A
Communist	M. Belcher	87	3.3	–2.9
Turnout		~2,629	51.1	+17.1
Registered electors		5,145		
Labour hold				
Labour hold				
Labour hold				
Labour hold				

=== No. 9 (Hemel Hempstead: Gadebridge) ===
No. 9 (Hemel Hempstead: Gadebridge) (2 seats)
Party	Candidate	Votes	%	±%
Labour	J. Wood	1,030	59.6	–15.8
Labour	R. Mitchell	1,000	57.9	–15.8
Conservative	G. Ehrlich	496	28.7	+9.9
Conservative	R. Needham	487	28.2	+10.3
Liberal	D. Fryatt	203	11.8	N/A
Liberal	C. Lockwood	170	9.8	N/A
Turnout		~1,727	47.8	+20.0
Registered electors		3,614		
Labour hold				
Labour hold				

=== No. 10 (Berkhamsted: North Church) ===
No. 10 (Berkhamsted: North Church) (3 seats)
Party	Candidate	Votes	%	±%
Conservative	J. Calnan*	1,546	66.0	+9.2
Conservative	J. Scott	1,223	52.2	N/A
Conservative	E. Warrington	1,104	47.2	N/A
Labour	S. Bayliss*	797	34.0	–9.2
Labour	D. Hart*	781	33.4	–5.7
Labour	D. Cox	645	27.5	–9.0
Turnout		~2,341	60.5	+12.6
Registered electors		3,870		
Conservative hold				
Conservative gain from Labour				
Conservative gain from Labour				

=== No. 11 (Berkhamsted: Castle & Sunnyside) ===
No. 11 (Berkhamsted: Castle & Sunnyside) (5 seats)
Party	Candidate	Votes	%	±%
Conservative	J. Brandy*	2,564	75.1	+24.0
Conservative	R. Peake*	2,470	72.4	+26.5
Conservative	G. Jones	2,386	69.9	+24.1
Conservative	A. Thomas	2,378	69.7	+24.6
Conservative	A. Webster	2,356	69.0	+25.6
Labour	A. Bayliss	851	24.9	+1.4
Labour	B. May	803	23.5	+2.1
Labour	J. Roberts	741	21.7	+0.9
Labour	I. Denvir	648	19.0	–0.3
Labour	R. O'Reilly	550	16.1	–1.9
Turnout		~3,414	45.8	–3.7
Registered electors		7,454		
Conservative hold				
Conservative hold				
Conservative hold				
Conservative hold				
Conservative hold				

=== No. 12 (Tring) ===
No. 12 (Tring) (5 seats)
Party	Candidate	Votes	%	±%
Independent	R. Halling*	1,748	33.8	–2.0
Conservative	D. Townsend	1,747	33.7	+4.2
Conservative	R. Young	1,613	31.1	+3.9
Conservative	H. Valentine*	1,587	30.6	+4.4
Conservative	J. Collings*	1,547	29.9	+4.9
Independent	G. McAndrew*	1,423	27.5	–3.1
Conservative	D. Woodcock	1,263	24.4	+0.2
Liberal	R. Oliver	844	16.3	–3.7
Labour	D. Fane	838	16.2	+1.6
Liberal	P. Taylor	799	15.4	–3.6
Liberal	P. Elley	694	13.4	N/A
Turnout		~5,178	80.8	+8.7
Registered electors		6,409		
Independent hold				
Conservative gain from Independent				
Conservative hold				
Conservative hold				
Conservative hold				

=== No. 13 (Aldbury & Tring Rural) ===
No. 13 (Aldbury & Tring Rural)
Party	Candidate	Votes	%	±%
Conservative	G. Walters	428	55.3	+4.5
Liberal	E. Glasser	175	22.6	N/A
Labour	P. Aldis	171	22.1	–27.1
Majority		253	32.7	+31.1
Turnout		774	55.8	+2.2
Registered electors		1,387		
Conservative hold				

=== No. 14 (North Church) ===
No. 14 (North Church)
Party	Candidate	Votes	%	±%
Conservative	J. Bird*	367	86.6	+9.3
Labour	J. Rickard	57	13.4	–9.3
Majority		310	73.1	+18.6
Turnout		424	44.9	+10.8
Registered electors		945		
Conservative hold		Swing	▲9.3	

=== No. 15 (Wigginton) ===
No. 15 (Wigginton)
Party	Candidate	Votes	%	±%
Independent	E. Ross	276	53.3	N/A
Conservative	B. Baker*	242	46.7	–9.0
Majority		34	6.6	N/A
Turnout		518	51.0	+10.2
Registered electors		1,016		
Independent gain from Conservative				

=== No. 16 (Little Gaddesden & Nettleden) ===
No. 16 (Little Gaddesden & Nettleden)
Party	Candidate	Votes	%	±%
Conservative	S. Whaley*	702	62.2	+11.7
Independent Liberal	J. Stobbs	335	29.7	N/A
Labour	D. Davison	92	8.1	–4.1
Majority		367	32.5	+19.3
Turnout		1,129	61.9	+5.8
Registered electors		1,825		
Conservative hold				

=== No. 20 (Markyate) ===
No. 20 (Markyate)
Party	Candidate	Votes	%	±%
Conservative	W. Terry	582	70.9	+10.2
Labour	D. Martin	239	29.1	–10.2
Majority		343	41.8	+20.3
Turnout		821	44.5	+6.8
Registered electors		1,844		
Conservative hold		Swing	▲10.2	

=== No. 21 (Flamstead) ===
No. 21 (Flamstead)
Party	Candidate	Votes	%	±%
Independent	W. Davies*	396	63.7	–29.4
Conservative	F. Philpott	226	36.3	N/A
Majority		170	27.3	–59.0
Turnout		622	60.1	+12.1
Registered electors		1,035		
Independent hold				

=== No. 22 (Great Gaddesden) ===
No. 22 (Great Gaddesden)
Party	Candidate	Votes	%	±%
Conservative	F. De Butts	396	87.2	+0.4
Labour	J. De Peyer	58	12.8	–0.4
Majority		338	74.4	+0.8
Turnout		454	55.6	+14.7
Registered electors		816		
Conservative hold		Swing	▲0.4	

=== South ===
South (2 seats)
Party	Candidate	Votes	%	±%
Conservative	P. Benton*	853	74.1	+21.9
Conservative	W. Robinson	813	70.7	+21.3
Labour	M. Craig	298	25.9	+6.2
Labour	J. Kelly	253	22.0	+3.3
Turnout		~1,151	49.7	+8.6
Registered electors		2,315		
Conservative hold				
Conservative hold				
