= 1983 Dacorum District Council election =

1983 UK local government election

- 5 May 1983

All 58 seats to Dacorum District Council 30 seats needed for a majority

	First party	Second party
Party	Conservative	Labour
Seats won	36	17
Seat change	▲4	▼6
Popular vote	39,060	31,356
Percentage	41.1%	33.0%
Swing	▼7.0%	▼8.2%
	Third party	Fourth party
Party	Alliance	Independent
Seats won	3	2
Seat change	▲3	▼1
Popular vote	22,297	2,056
Percentage	23.4%	2.2%
Swing	▲18.1%	▼1.4%
- Winner of each seat at the 1983 Dacorum District Council election.
Control before election
Conservative
Control after election
Conservative

The 1983 Dacorum District Council election took place on 5 May 1983 to elect members of Dacorum District Council in Hertfordshire, England. This was on the same day as other local elections.

== Summary ==
=== Election result ===
1983 Dacorum District Council election
Party	Candidates	Seats	Gains	Losses	Net gain/loss	Seats %	Votes %	Votes	+/−
Conservative	58	36	4	0	▲4	62.1	41.1	39,060	–7.0
Labour	58	17	0	6	▼6	29.3	33.0	31,356	–8.2
Alliance	45	3	3	0	▲3	5.2	23.4	22,297	+18.1
Independent	3	2	0	1	▼1	3.4	2.2	2,056	–1.4
Communist	1	0	0	0	Steady	0.0	0.2	188	+0.1
Ecology	1	0	0	0	Steady	0.0	0.2	160	N/A

== Ward results ==
Incumbent councillors standing for re-election are marked with an asterisk (*). Changes in seats do not take into account by-elections or defections.

=== Adeyfield East ===
Adeyfield East (2 seats)
Party	Candidate	Votes	%	±%
Labour	G. Scribbens*	807	41.8	–3.0
Labour	I. Laidlaw-Dickson*	790	41.0	–3.1
Conservative	T. Robinson	661	34.3	–6.3
Conservative	C. Cadman	625	32.4	–4.5
Alliance	J. Blackman	332	17.2	+5.4
Turnout		~1,929	49.2	–39.6
Registered electors		3,920		
Labour hold				
Labour hold				

=== Adeyfield West ===
Adeyfield West (3 seats)
Party	Candidate	Votes	%	±%
Labour	L. Taber*	1,221	51.0	–7.7
Labour	B. Breslin	1,087	45.4	–11.3
Labour	M. Young*	1,074	44.8	–10.9
Conservative	G. Payne	673	28.1	–9.4
Conservative	T. Bowers	666	27.8	–8.4
Conservative	J. Lill	664	27.7	–8.1
Alliance	N. Hawkes	521	21.7	N/A
Alliance	S. Fryer	510	21.3	N/A
Turnout		~2,396	52.5	–28.2
Registered electors		4,563		
Labour hold				
Labour hold				
Labour hold				

=== Aldbury & Wigginton ===
Aldbury & Wigginton
Party	Candidate	Votes	%	±%
Conservative	A. Whitehead	634	75.8	+48.6
Labour	J. Cranfield	202	24.2	N/A
Majority		432	51.6	N/A
Turnout		836	47.8	–36.8
Registered electors		1,747		
Conservative gain from Independent				

=== Ashridge ===
Ashridge (2 seats)
Party	Candidate	Votes	%	±%
Conservative	F. Seely	1,003	63.0	+0.7
Conservative	J. Massey	999	62.8	+2.5
Alliance	G. Davies	352	22.1	+0.5
Alliance	G. Evans	345	21.7	+7.5
Labour	V. Mincer	127	8.0	–8.1
Labour	M. Pesch	117	7.4	–7.4
Turnout		~1,592	58.5	–32.1
Registered electors		2,721		
Conservative hold				
Conservative hold				

=== Bennetts End ===
Bennetts End (3 seats)
Party	Candidate	Votes	%	±%
Labour	J. Lucas	1,162	50.5	–1.6
Labour	L. Morris	1,051	45.7	–2.5
Labour	R. Haverson	1,045	45.4	–1.1
Conservative	F. Foster	573	24.9	–3.7
Conservative	C. Gatehouse	559	24.3	–3.4
Conservative	S. Parker	551	23.9	–2.1
Alliance	K. Moon	484	21.0	N/A
Alliance	H. Inward	474	20.6	N/A
Alliance	A. Cawkell	473	20.6	N/A
Turnout		~2,301	51.8	–43.0
Registered electors		4,442		
Labour hold				
Labour hold				
Labour hold				

=== Berkhamsted Central ===
Berkhamsted Central (2 seats)
Party	Candidate	Votes	%	±%
Conservative	K. Coleman	1,064	56.9	–2.6
Conservative	B. Everall	1,057	56.5	–2.6
Alliance	I. Scott	540	28.9	+6.8
Alliance	I. McCalla	525	28.1	N/A
Labour	D. Moss	170	9.1	–9.4
Labour	V. Whitlock	142	7.6	–10.8
Turnout		~1,870	51.8	–43.4
Registered electors		3,610		
Conservative hold				
Conservative hold				

=== Berkhamsted East ===
Berkhamsted East (3 seats)
Party	Candidate	Votes	%	±%
Conservative	W. Lees	1,176	50.7	+6.0
Conservative	G. Jones	1,133	48.9	+4.3
Conservative	R. Peake*	1,054	45.5	+8.1
Alliance	W. Carlile-Stitson	528	22.8	N/A
Alliance	G. Stevens	494	21.3	N/A
Alliance	M. Brison	468	20.2	N/A
Labour	B. May	442	19.1	–9.0
Labour	J. Roberts	430	18.6	–9.0
Labour	H. Richardson	405	17.5	–7.9
Turnout		~2,317	47.9	–48.8
Registered electors		4,838		
Conservative hold				
Conservative hold				
Conservative hold				

=== Berkhamsted West ===
Berkhamsted West (2 seats)
Party	Candidate	Votes	%	±%
Conservative	J. Carter	885	47.4	+3.8
Conservative	V. Milrath*	883	47.3	+6.1
Labour	C. Morrish	447	24.0	–14.4
Labour	R. Houlton	437	23.4	+0.2
Alliance	N. Travis	416	22.3	+4.3
Alliance	M. Singleton	395	21.2	N/A
Turnout		~1,865	54.0	–44.0
Registered electors		3,454		
Conservative hold				
Conservative hold				

=== Bovingdon & Flaunden ===
Bovingdon & Flaunden (2 seats)
Party	Candidate	Votes	%	±%
Conservative	P. Mayo*	965	51.3	–1.7
Conservative	A. Janes*	951	50.5	+0.8
Alliance	J. Bell	384	20.4	+9.0
Independent	W. Symons	342	18.2	–1.6
Labour	C. Keep	192	10.2	–5.6
Labour	R. Simpson	189	10.0	–5.6
Turnout		~1,881	55.5	–41.9
Registered electors		3,390		
Conservative hold				
Conservative hold				

=== Boxmoor ===
Boxmoor (3 seats)
Party	Candidate	Votes	%	±%
Conservative	A. Barling*	1,532	52.6	+2.2
Conservative	M. King*	1,531	52.6	+5.2
Conservative	J. Buteux*	1,470	50.5	+4.1
Labour	F. Ryan	660	22.7	–8.5
Labour	I. Raeburn	657	22.6	–8.2
Alliance	J. Horton	641	22.0	+11.6
Alliance	M. Coxage	615	21.1	N/A
Labour	K. Cushion	586	20.1	–10.5
Communist	D. Leigh	188	6.5	N/A
Turnout		~2,910	58.3	–35.9
Registered electors		4,992		
Conservative hold				
Conservative hold				
Conservative hold				

=== Central ===
Central (2 seats)
Party	Candidate	Votes	%	±%
Conservative	A. Toms*	823	46.9	–2.3
Conservative	C. Appleby*	789	45.0	+0.7
Labour	F. Wood	456	26.0	–11.8
Labour	D. Harding	450	25.6	–10.8
Alliance	D. Lewis	366	20.9	+7.9
Alliance	J. Lear	335	19.1	N/A
Turnout		~1,755	48.2	–37.4
Registered electors		3,641		
Conservative hold				
Conservative hold				

=== Chaulden ===
Chaulden
Party	Candidate	Votes	%	±%
Labour	D. Brown*	647	51.3	–5.8
Conservative	J. Marshall	366	29.0	–4.5
Alliance	W. Killen	248	19.7	+12.5
Majority		281	22.3	–1.3
Turnout		1,261	60.2	–24.4
Registered electors		2,130		
Labour hold				

=== Chipperfield ===
Chipperfield
Party	Candidate	Votes	%	±%
Conservative	J. Nichols*	557	80.6	+2.7
Labour	J. Coleman	134	19.4	–2.7
Majority		423	61.2	+5.4
Turnout		691	52.2	–34.6
Registered electors		1,372		
Conservative hold				

=== Crabtree ===
Crabtree (3 seats)
Party	Candidate	Votes	%	±%
Conservative	C. Barling*	1,103	43.0	+2.2
Conservative	J. Byfield	1,100	42.9	+2.9
Conservative	T. Eastman	1,059	41.3	+1.9
Labour	S. Harrison	812	31.7	–9.0
Labour	P. Ryan	784	30.6	–6.7
Labour	J. Smith	784	30.6	–6.7
Alliance	C. Sivers	548	21.4	+2.9
Alliance	C. Roe	501	19.5	N/A
Alliance	R. Willson	477	18.6	N/A
Turnout		~2,565	51.9	–36.0
Registered electors		4,942		
Conservative hold				
Conservative gain from Labour				
Conservative hold				

=== Cupid Green ===
Cupid Green (2 seats)
Party	Candidate	Votes	%	±%
Conservative	O. Collingwood*	880	51.4	+7.2
Conservative	D. Samuels	798	46.6	+7.6
Labour	C. Dart	466	27.2	–14.4
Labour	R. Payne	443	25.9	–12.0
Alliance	G. Masters	330	19.3	+5.1
Alliance	J. Payne	300	17.5	N/A
Turnout		~1,713	42.0	–40.6
Registered electors		4,079		
Conservative hold				
Conservative gain from Labour				

=== Flamstead & Markyate ===
Flamstead & Markyate (2 seats)
Party	Candidate	Votes	%	±%
Conservative	J. Taunton*	933	62.8	–8.6
Conservative	R. Kent	899	60.5	–9.2
Alliance	J. Davies	339	22.8	N/A
Labour	J. Seymour	228	15.3	–13.3
Labour	H. Mincer	198	13.3	–13.9
Turnout		~1,486	45.9	–34.1
Registered electors		3,238		
Conservative hold				
Conservative hold				

=== Gadebridge ===
Gadebridge (2 seats)
Party	Candidate	Votes	%	±%
Labour	J. Wood*	845	42.4	–15.2
Labour	A. Mitchell	760	38.2	–15.9
Alliance	T. Boreham	747	37.5	+26.1
Alliance	K. Murphy	593	29.8	N/A
Conservative	M. White	359	18.0	–11.4
Conservative	T. Marwood	351	17.6	N/A
Turnout		~1,992	53.8	–19.8
Registered electors		3,702		
Labour hold				
Labour hold				

=== Grove Hill ===
Grove Hill (3 seats)
Party	Candidate	Votes	%	±%
Alliance	N. Hollinghurst	1,022	36.2	+15.9
Alliance	G. Buxton-Hoare	917	32.5	N/A
Alliance	J. Blackman	889	31.5	N/A
Conservative	C. Lill	865	30.7	–4.3
Conservative	J. Stanton	822	29.1	–5.1
Conservative	R. Stanton	817	29.0	–0.6
Labour	P. Hinson	807	28.6	–18.7
Labour	L. Leavey	755	26.8	–18.4
Labour	T. Smith	749	26.5	–18.6
Turnout		~2,822	50.1	–23.1
Registered electors		5,632		
Alliance gain from Labour				
Alliance gain from Labour				
Alliance gain from Labour				

=== Highfield ===
Highfield (3 seats)
Party	Candidate	Votes	%	±%
Labour	P. Doyle*	1,105	51.9	+2.5
Labour	P. Palfrey*	984	46.2	–0.6
Labour	M. O'Shea	944	44.3	+7.0
Conservative	G. Hanson	500	23.5	–6.0
Conservative	J. Rimmer	465	21.8	–1.1
Conservative	D. Harrington	463	21.7	–0.9
Alliance	J. Day	441	20.7	–0.5
Alliance	W. Lear	430	20.2	N/A
Alliance	F. Corcoran	413	19.4	N/A
Turnout		~2,130	48.0	–45.2
Registered electors		4,438		
Labour hold				
Labour hold				
Labour hold				

=== Kings Langley ===
Kings Langley (2 seats)
Party	Candidate	Votes	%	±%
Conservative	D. Barker*	1,212	70.6	+2.5
Conservative	W. Driver*	1,074	62.6	+1.3
Labour	R. Cox	470	27.4	–4.5
Labour	I. Bell	380	22.1	–9.1
Turnout		~1,717	46.9	–38.0
Registered electors		3,660		
Conservative hold				
Conservative hold				

=== Leverstock Green ===
Leverstock Green (3 seats)
Party	Candidate	Votes	%	±%
Conservative	H. Bassadone*	1,642	55.3	–6.3
Conservative	P. Courtnage*	1,633	55.0	–5.9
Conservative	J. Hanson	1,556	52.4	–7.9
Labour	R. Garland	753	25.3	–13.2
Labour	J. Lewis	740	24.9	–12.5
Labour	B. Reading	701	23.6	–10.5
Alliance	E. Baker	686	23.1	N/A
Turnout		~2,971	53.2	–28.6
Registered electors		5,584		
Conservative hold				
Conservative hold				
Conservative hold				

=== Nash Mills ===
Nash Mills
Party	Candidate	Votes	%	±%
Labour	D. Jones	419	46.3	–5.8
Conservative	D. Eversfield	393	43.5	+4.6
Alliance	S. Pratt	92	10.2	+1.3
Majority		26	2.8	–10.4
Turnout		904	56.9	–26.8
Registered electors		1,652		
Labour hold		Swing	▼5.2	

=== Northchurch ===
Northchurch
Party	Candidate	Votes	%	±%
Conservative	G. Scott*	507	63.7	–5.1
Alliance	E. Patterson	210	26.4	–4.8
Labour	E. Cushion	79	9.9	N/A
Majority		297	37.3	–0.4
Turnout		796	47.3	–35.5
Registered electors		1,717		
Conservative hold				

=== South ===
South
Party	Candidate	Votes	%	±%
Conservative	P. Benton*	703	55.0	–12.8
Alliance	L. Roe	349	27.3	+21.6
Labour	G. Haslock	227	17.7	–8.8
Majority		354	27.7	–13.5
Turnout		1,279	50.3	–36.2
Registered electors		2,601		
Conservative hold		Swing	▼17.2	

=== Tring Central ===
Tring Central (2 seats)
Party	Candidate	Votes	%	±%
Independent	R. Halling*	955	52.0	–12.8
Conservative	T. Amsden	696	37.9	–0.2
Conservative	B. Northcott	638	34.7	+14.2
Alliance	P. Elley	490	26.7	+13.2
Labour	T. Wolanski	387	21.1	–3.9
Labour	S. Allcock	381	20.7	+1.8
Turnout		~1,838	49.4	–27.3
Registered electors		3,720		
Independent hold				
Conservative hold				

=== Tring East ===
Tring East (1 seat)
Party	Candidate	Votes	%	±%
Conservative	R. Neale	601	67.2	–15.0
Alliance	E. Williams	227	25.4	N/A
Labour	D. Eaude	66	7.4	–10.4
Majority		374	41.8	–12.7
Turnout		894	51.7	–36.1
Registered electors		1,734		
Conservative hold				

=== Tring West ===
Tring West (2 seats)
Party	Candidate	Votes	%	±%
Conservative	D. Townsend*	1,008	59.3	+7.4
Independent	R. Tucker*	759	44.7	–2.5
Conservative	P. Ginger	597	35.1	–11.4
Alliance	D. Smith	378	22.3	+4.6
Labour	J. Dymond	317	18.7	–0.5
Labour	G. Lynch	279	16.4	–1.3
Ecology	R. Oliver	160	9.4	N/A
Turnout		~1,699	47.4	–34.5
Registered electors		3,584		
Conservative hold				
Independent hold				

=== Warners End ===
Warners End (3 seats)
Party	Candidate	Votes	%	±%
Labour	P. Willoughby	1,199	47.3	–5.7
Labour	R. McDonald	1,135	44.8	–5.4
Labour	J. Smart	1,101	43.5	–5.4
Conservative	J. Mitchell	636	25.1	–8.6
Conservative	S. Fry	612	24.2	–5.8
Conservative	P. Newton	603	23.8	–5.3
Alliance	R. Bowers	575	22.7	+9.5
Alliance	J. Redding	562	22.2	N/A
Alliance	T. Watts	551	21.8	N/A
Turnout		~2,553	49.6	–40.0
Registered electors		5,106		
Labour hold				
Labour hold				
Labour hold				
