= 1979 Dacorum District Council election =

1979 English local government election

- 3 May 1979

All 58 seats to Dacorum District Council 30 seats needed for a majority

| | First party | Second party | Third party |
|---|---|---|---|
| Party | Conservative | Labour | Independent |
| Seats won | 32 | 23 | 3 |
| Seat change | ▼6 | ▲2 | Steady |
| Popular vote | 79,031 | 67,717 | 5,996 |
| Percentage | 48.1% | 41.2% | 3.6% |
| Swing | ▼4.5% | ▲3.4% | ▲1.0% |
- Winner of each seat at the 1979 Dacorum Borough Council election.
Control before election
Conservative
Control after election
Conservative

The 1979 Dacorum District Council election took place on 3 May 1979 to elect members of Dacorum District Council in Hertfordshire, England. This was on the same day as the 1979 general election and other local elections.

The whole council was up for election on new ward boundaries, decreasing the overall number of seats from 62 to 58.

== Summary ==
=== Election result ===
1979 Dacorum District Council election
| Party | Candidates | Seats | Gains | Losses | Net gain/loss | Seats % | Votes % | Votes | +/− |
|---|---|---|---|---|---|---|---|---|---|
| Conservative | 57 | 32 | 0 | 0 | ▼6 | 55.2 | 48.1 | 79,031 | –4.5 |
| Labour | 56 | 23 | 0 | 0 | ▲2 | 39.7 | 41.2 | 67,717 | +3.4 |
| Independent | 6 | 3 | 0 | 0 | Steady | 0.0 | 3.6 | 5,996 | +1.0 |
| Liberal | 20 | 0 | 0 | 0 | Steady | 0.0 | 5.3 | 8,693 | –0.8 |
| Ind. Conservative | 2 | 0 | 0 | 0 | Steady | 0.0 | 1.0 | 1,576 | N/A |
| Independent Labour | 1 | 0 | 0 | 0 | Steady | 0.0 | 0.4 | 731 | N/A |
| National Front | 5 | 0 | 0 | 0 | Steady | 0.0 | 0.3 | 469 | ±0.0 |
| Communist | 2 | 0 | 0 | 0 | Steady | 0.0 | 0.1 | 125 | –0.3 |

== Ward results ==
Incumbent councillors standing for re-election are marked with an asterisk (*). Changes in seats do not take into account by-elections or defections.

=== Adeyfield East ===
Adeyfield East (2 seats)
| Party | Candidate | Votes | % |
|---|---|---|---|
| Labour | I. Laidlaw-Dickson | 1,459 | 44.8 |
| Labour | G. Scribens* | 1,438 | 44.1 |
| Conservative | D. Harrington | 1,324 | 40.6 |
| Conservative | G. White | 1,201 | 36.9 |
| Liberal | J. Blackman | 385 | 11.8 |
| National Front | G. Robertson | 91 | 2.8 |
| National Front | T. Walters | 75 | 2.3 |
| Turnout | | ~3,259 | 88.8 |
| Registered electors | | 3,670 | |
| Labour win (new seat) | | | |
| Labour win (new seat) | | | |

=== Adeyfield West ===
Adeyfield West (3 seats)
| Party | Candidate | Votes | % |
|---|---|---|---|
| Labour | L. Taber* | 2,141 | 58.7 |
| Labour | J. Botfield | 2,070 | 56.7 |
| Labour | M. Young* | 2,031 | 55.7 |
| Conservative | J. Hanson | 1,367 | 37.5 |
| Conservative | J. Giddins | 1,322 | 36.2 |
| Conservative | D. Eversfield | 1,307 | 35.8 |
| National Front | W. Griggs | 141 | 3.9 |
| National Front | S. Price | 119 | 3.3 |
| Turnout | | ~3,649 | 80.7 |
| Registered electors | | 4,522 | |
| Labour win (new seat) | | | |
| Labour win (new seat) | | | |
| Labour win (new seat) | | | |

=== Aldbury & Wigginton ===
Aldbury & Wigginton
| Party | Candidate | Votes | % |
|---|---|---|---|
| Independent | E. Ross* | 997 | 72.8 |
| Conservative | G. Walters* | 373 | 27.2 |
| Majority | | 624 | 45.5 |
| Turnout | | 1,370 | 84.6 |
| Registered electors | | 1,619 | |
| Independent win (new seat) | | | |

=== Ashridge ===
Ashridge (2 seats)
| Party | Candidate | Votes | % |
|---|---|---|---|
| Conservative | F. De Butts* | 1,601 | 62.3 |
| Conservative | J. Scott* | 1,551 | 60.3 |
| Liberal | J. Stobbs | 556 | 21.6 |
| Labour | J. Lucas | 414 | 16.1 |
| Labour | I. Berkovitch | 381 | 14.8 |
| Liberal | G. Davies | 366 | 14.2 |
| Turnout | | ~2,570 | 90.6 |
| Registered electors | | 2,837 | |
| Conservative win (new seat) | | | |
| Conservative win (new seat) | | | |

=== Bennetts End ===
Bennetts End (3 seats)
| Party | Candidate | Votes | % |
|---|---|---|---|
| Labour | C. Cushion | 2,198 | 52.1 |
| Labour | J. Dorchester* | 2,034 | 48.2 |
| Labour | K. Fletcher | 1,961 | 46.5 |
| Conservative | T. Eastman | 1,207 | 28.6 |
| Conservative | S. Fewery | 1,171 | 27.7 |
| Conservative | F. Foster | 1,098 | 26.0 |
| Independent Labour | C. De Peyer | 731 | 17.3 |
| Communist | L. Leigh | 85 | 2.0 |
| Turnout | | ~4,220 | 94.8 |
| Registered electors | | 4,452 | |
| Labour win (new seat) | | | |
| Labour win (new seat) | | | |
| Labour win (new seat) | | | |

=== Berkhamsted Central ===
Berkhamsted Central (2 seats)
| Party | Candidate | Votes | % |
|---|---|---|---|
| Conservative | K. Coleman* | 1,828 | 59.5 |
| Conservative | A. Thomas* | 1,816 | 59.1 |
| Liberal | I. McCalla | 678 | 22.1 |
| Labour | K. Beddall | 567 | 18.5 |
| Labour | G. Thomas | 565 | 18.4 |
| Turnout | | ~3,073 | 95.2 |
| Registered electors | | 3,228 | |
| Conservative win (new seat) | | | |
| Conservative win (new seat) | | | |

=== Berkhamsted East ===
Berkhamsted East (3 seats)
| Party | Candidate | Votes | % |
|---|---|---|---|
| Conservative | P. Adams | 1,871 | 44.7 |
| Conservative | A. Medcalf | 1,868 | 44.6 |
| Conservative | R. Peake* | 1,567 | 37.4 |
| Labour | J. Roberts | 1,177 | 28.1 |
| Labour | B. May | 1,157 | 27.6 |
| Ind. Conservative | J. Bandy* | 1,138 | 27.2 |
| Labour | C. Morrish | 1,063 | 25.4 |
| Turnout | | ~4,188 | 96.7 |
| Registered electors | | 4,331 | |
| Conservative win (new seat) | | | |
| Conservative win (new seat) | | | |
| Conservative win (new seat) | | | |

=== Berkhamsted West ===
Berkhamsted West (2 seats)
| Party | Candidate | Votes | % |
|---|---|---|---|
| Conservative | E. Warrington | 1,387 | 43.6 |
| Conservative | V. Milrath | 1,313 | 41.2 |
| Labour | S. Bayliss | 1,223 | 38.4 |
| Labour | B. Hing | 739 | 23.2 |
| Liberal | E. Patterson | 574 | 18.0 |
| Turnout | | ~3,183 | 98.0 |
| Registered electors | | 3,248 | |
| Conservative win (new seat) | | | |
| Conservative win (new seat) | | | |

=== Bovingdon & Flaunden ===
Bovingdon & Flaunden (2 seats)
| Party | Candidate | Votes | % | ±% |
|---|---|---|---|---|
| Conservative | P. Mayo* | 1,544 | 53.0 | –2.0 |
| Conservative | A. Janes | 1,447 | 49.7 | –4.0 |
| Independent | W. Symons | 578 | 19.8 | –4.3 |
| Labour | B. Farrer | 459 | 15.8 | –5.0 |
| Labour | J. Gaber | 454 | 15.6 | –2.7 |
| Liberal | M. Maynard | 332 | 11.4 | N/A |
| Turnout | | ~2,914 | 97.4 | +38.8 |
| Registered electors | | 2,992 | | |
| Conservative hold | | | | |
| Conservative hold | | | | |

=== Boxmoor ===
Boxmoor (3 seats)
| Party | Candidate | Votes | % |
|---|---|---|---|
| Conservative | M. King* | 2,161 | 50.4 |
| Conservative | A. Barling* | 2,030 | 47.4 |
| Conservative | J. Buteux* | 1,986 | 46.4 |
| Labour | M. Crosby | 1,337 | 31.2 |
| Labour | P. Ingold | 1,319 | 30.8 |
| Labour | J. Smith | 1,313 | 30.6 |
| Liberal | L. Roe | 447 | 10.4 |
| Independent | C. Tonkin | 337 | 7.9 |
| Turnout | | ~4,284 | 94.2 |
| Registered electors | | 4,548 | |
| Conservative win (new seat) | | | |
| Conservative win (new seat) | | | |
| Conservative win (new seat) | | | |

=== Central ===
Central (2 seats)
| Party | Candidate | Votes | % |
|---|---|---|---|
| Conservative | C. Fowler* | 1,403 | 49.2 |
| Conservative | A. Toms* | 1,264 | 44.3 |
| Labour | D. Harding | 1,078 | 37.8 |
| Labour | J. Seymour | 1,038 | 36.4 |
| Liberal | J. Dover | 372 | 13.0 |
| Turnout | | ~2,854 | 85.6 |
| Registered electors | | 3,334 | |
| Conservative win (new seat) | | | |
| Conservative win (new seat) | | | |

=== Chaulden ===
Chaulden
| Party | Candidate | Votes | % |
|---|---|---|---|
| Labour | D. Brown | 1,051 | 57.1 |
| Conservative | J. Price | 617 | 33.5 |
| Liberal | J. Adams | 133 | 7.2 |
| Communist | J. Pearce | 40 | 2.2 |
| Majority | | 434 | 23.6 |
| Turnout | | 1,841 | 84.6 |
| Registered electors | | 2,175 | |
| Labour win (new seat) | | | |

=== Chipperfield ===
Chipperfield
| Party | Candidate | Votes | % |
|---|---|---|---|
| Conservative | J. Nichols* | 881 | 77.9 |
| Labour | J. Kelly | 250 | 22.1 |
| Majority | | 631 | 55.8 |
| Turnout | | 1,131 | 86.8 |
| Registered electors | | 1,303 | |
| Conservative hold | | | |

=== Crabtree ===
Crabtree (3 seats)
| Party | Candidate | Votes | % |
|---|---|---|---|
| Conservative | C. Barling* | 1,728 | 40.8 |
| Labour | C. Haslock | 1,723 | 40.7 |
| Conservative | C. Appleby* | 1,695 | 40.0 |
| Conservative | B. Luck | 1,671 | 39.4 |
| Labour | A. Maclaughlin | 1,581 | 37.3 |
| Labour | P. Ryan | 1,581 | 37.3 |
| Liberal | C. Sivers | 786 | 18.5 |
| Turnout | | ~4,238 | 87.9 |
| Registered electors | | 4,821 | |
| Conservative win (new seat) | | | |
| Labour win (new seat) | | | |
| Conservative win (new seat) | | | |

=== Cupid Green ===
Cupid Green (2 seats)
| Party | Candidate | Votes | % |
|---|---|---|---|
| Conservative | O. Collingwood | 1,179 | 44.2 |
| Labour | S. Crosby | 1,110 | 41.6 |
| Conservative | G. Hanson | 1,041 | 39.0 |
| Labour | R. Stepto | 1,011 | 37.9 |
| Liberal | R. Coles | 379 | 14.2 |
| Turnout | | ~2,669 | 82.6 |
| Registered electors | | 3,231 | |
| Conservative win (new seat) | | | |
| Labour win (new seat) | | | |

=== Flamstead & Markyate ===
Flamstead & Markyate (2 seats)
| Party | Candidate | Votes | % |
|---|---|---|---|
| Conservative | J. Taunton | 1,641 | 71.4 |
| Conservative | W. Terry* | 1,601 | 69.7 |
| Labour | F. Taylor | 656 | 28.6 |
| Labour | A. Hooper | 625 | 27.2 |
| Turnout | | ~2,297 | 80.0 |
| Registered electors | | 2,871 | |
| Conservative win (new seat) | | | |
| Conservative win (new seat) | | | |

=== Gadebridge ===
Gadebridge (2 seats)
| Party | Candidate | Votes | % |
|---|---|---|---|
| Labour | J. Wood* | 1,513 | 57.6 |
| Labour | R. Mitchell* | 1,422 | 54.1 |
| Conservative | G. Payne | 773 | 29.4 |
| Liberal | P. Harris | 300 | 11.4 |
| National Front | J. McAuley | 43 | 1.6 |
| Turnout | | ~2,628 | 73.6 |
| Registered electors | | 3,571 | |
| Labour win (new seat) | | | |
| Labour win (new seat) | | | |

=== Grove Hill ===
Grove Hill (3 seats)
| Party | Candidate | Votes | % |
|---|---|---|---|
| Labour | C. Maxwell | 1,442 | 47.3 |
| Labour | A. Buckland | 1,377 | 45.2 |
| Labour | L. Morris | 1,374 | 45.1 |
| Independent | W. Faupel | 1,320 | 43.3 |
| Conservative | G. Clennell | 1,066 | 35.0 |
| Conservative | A. Smith | 1,041 | 34.2 |
| Conservative | K. Bishop | 901 | 29.6 |
| Liberal | J. Blackman | 620 | 20.3 |
| Turnout | | ~3,047 | 73.2 |
| Registered electors | | 4,161 | |
| Labour win (new seat) | | | |
| Labour win (new seat) | | | |
| Labour win (new seat) | | | |

=== Highfield ===
Highfield (3 seats)
| Party | Candidate | Votes | % |
|---|---|---|---|
| Labour | P. Doyle* | 1,949 | 49.4 |
| Labour | J. Annison* | 1,848 | 46.8 |
| Labour | P. Palfrey* | 1,473 | 37.3 |
| Conservative | E. Cooper | 1,162 | 29.5 |
| Conservative | N. Halsey | 904 | 22.9 |
| Conservative | P. Smith | 892 | 22.6 |
| Liberal | G. Lawrence | 835 | 21.2 |
| Turnout | | ~3,945 | 93.2 |
| Registered electors | | 4,233 | |
| Labour win (new seat) | | | |
| Labour win (new seat) | | | |
| Labour win (new seat) | | | |

=== Kings Langley ===
Kings Langley (2 seats)
| Party | Candidate | Votes | % | ±% |
|---|---|---|---|---|
| Conservative | D. Barker | 2,024 | 68.1 | –2.4 |
| Conservative | W. Driver* | 1,822 | 61.3 | –6.1 |
| Labour | R. Cox | 949 | 31.9 | +2.4 |
| Labour | D. Moss | 928 | 31.2 | +4.0 |
| Turnout | | ~2,972 | 84.9 | +33.2 |
| Registered electors | | 3,501 | | |
| Conservative hold | | | | |
| Conservative hold | | | | |

=== Leverstock Green ===
Leverstock Green (3 seats)
| Party | Candidate | Votes | % |
|---|---|---|---|
| Conservative | P. Cash | 2,663 | 61.6 |
| Conservative | H. Bassadone* | 2,632 | 60.9 |
| Conservative | P. Courtnage* | 2,606 | 60.3 |
| Labour | W. Holdsworth | 1,663 | 38.5 |
| Labour | A. Fethney | 1,618 | 37.4 |
| Labour | F. Temple | 1,574 | 34.1 |
| Turnout | | ~4,324 | 81.8 |
| Registered electors | | 5,286 | |
| Conservative win (new seat) | | | |
| Conservative win (new seat) | | | |
| Conservative win (new seat) | | | |

=== Nash Mills ===
Nash Mills
| Party | Candidate | Votes | % |
|---|---|---|---|
| Labour | S. Davison* | 684 | 52.1 |
| Conservative | J. Byfield | 511 | 38.9 |
| Liberal | R. Wilson | 117 | 8.9 |
| Majority | | 173 | 13.2 |
| Turnout | | 1,312 | 83.7 |
| Registered electors | | 1,567 | |
| Labour win (new seat) | | | |

=== Northchurch ===
Northchurch
| Party | Candidate | Votes | % |
|---|---|---|---|
| Conservative | G. Scott | 868 | 68.8 |
| Liberal | I. Scott | 393 | 31.2 |
| Majority | | 475 | 37.7 |
| Turnout | | 1,261 | 82.8 |
| Registered electors | | 1,523 | |
| Conservative win (new seat) | | | |

=== South ===
South
| Party | Candidate | Votes | % |
|---|---|---|---|
| Conservative | P. Benton* | 1,382 | 67.8 |
| Labour | R. Linsley | 541 | 26.5 |
| Liberal | C. Roe | 116 | 5.7 |
| Majority | | 841 | 41.2 |
| Turnout | | 2,039 | 86.5 |
| Registered electors | | 2,357 | |
| Conservative win (new boundaries) | | | |

=== Tring Central ===
Tring Central (2 seats)
| Party | Candidate | Votes | % |
|---|---|---|---|
| Independent | R. Halling* | 1,473 | 64.8 |
| Conservative | R. Young* | 867 | 38.1 |
| Labour | P. Aldis | 569 | 25.0 |
| Conservative | P. Garnham | 466 | 20.5 |
| Ind. Conservative | G. McAndrew | 438 | 19.3 |
| Labour | D. Eaude | 429 | 18.9 |
| Liberal | P. Elley | 306 | 13.5 |
| Turnout | | ~2,274 | 76.7 |
| Registered electors | | 2,963 | |
| Independent win (new seat) | | | |
| Conservative win (new seat) | | | |

=== Tring East ===
Tring East
| Party | Candidate | Votes | % |
|---|---|---|---|
| Conservative | J. Collings* | 1,084 | 82.2 |
| Labour | J. Dymond | 235 | 17.8 |
| Majority | | 849 | 64.4 |
| Turnout | | 1,319 | 87.8 |
| Registered electors | | 1,503 | |
| Conservative win (new seat) | | | |

=== Tring West ===
Tring West (2 seats)
| Party | Candidate | Votes | % |
|---|---|---|---|
| Conservative | D. Townsend* | 1,419 | 51.9 |
| Independent | R. Tucker | 1,291 | 47.2 |
| Conservative | R. Cole | 1,272 | 46.5 |
| Labour | J. De Peyer | 525 | 19.2 |
| Labour | R. Holledge | 483 | 17.7 |
| Liberal | D. Badrick | 483 | 17.7 |
| Turnout | | ~2,737 | 81.9 |
| Registered electors | | 3,342 | |
| Conservative win (new seat) | | | |
| Independent win (new seat) | | | |

=== Warners End ===
Warners End (3 seats)
| Party | Candidate | Votes | % |
|---|---|---|---|
| Labour | J. Geraghty* | 2,063 | 53.0 |
| Labour | G. Mitchell* | 1,953 | 50.2 |
| Labour | R. Glatter | 1,901 | 48.9 |
| Conservative | J. Nairn | 1,312 | 33.7 |
| Conservative | R. Foord-Kelcey | 1,169 | 30.0 |
| Conservative | A. Webster | 1,134 | 29.1 |
| Liberal | W. Whalley | 515 | 13.2 |
| Turnout | | ~3,890 | 89.6 |
| Registered electors | | 4,342 | |
| Labour win (new seat) | | | |
| Labour win (new seat) | | | |
| Labour win (new seat) | | | |
