= 2007 Dacorum Borough Council election =

2007 UK local government election

- 3 May 2007

All 51 seats to Dacorum Borough Council 26 seats needed for a majority

	First party	Second party	Third party
Party	Conservative	Liberal Democrats	Labour
Seats won	44	5	2
Seat change	▲12	▼1	▼12
Popular vote	46,092	17,136	16,928
Percentage	54.7%	20.3%	20.1%
Swing	▲10.3%	▼4.1%	▼9.3%
- Winner of each seat at the 2007 Dacorum Borough Council election.
Control before election
Conservative
Control after election
Conservative

The 2007 Dacorum Borough Council election took place on 3 May 2007 to elect members of Dacorum Borough Council in Hertfordshire, England. This was on the same day as other local elections.

The whole council was up for election with boundary changes since the last election reducing the number of seats by 1 to 51.

The Conservative Party remained in overall control of the council after winning 44 of the 51 seats, partly attributing the "surprising" scale of the victory to national events, while the Liberal Democrats lost 2 seats but were pleased to become the official opposition.

== Summary ==
=== Election result ===
2007 Dacorum Borough Council election
Party	Candidates	Seats	Gains	Losses	Net gain/loss	Seats %	Votes %	Votes	+/−
Conservative	51	44	12	0	▲12	86.3	54.7	46,092	+10.3
Liberal Democrats	51	5	0	4	▼1	9.8	20.3	17,136	–4.1
Labour	51	2	0	8	▼12	3.9	20.1	16,928	–9.3
Green	13	0	0	0	Steady	0.0	3.0	2,516	+1.8
Independent	3	0	0	0	Steady	0.0	1.3	1,083	+0.8
National Front	2	0	0	0	Steady	0.0	0.6	541	N/A

== Ward results ==
Incumbent councillors standing for re-election are marked with an asterisk (*). Changes in seats do not take into account by-elections or defections.

=== Adeyfield East ===
Adeyfield East (2 seats)
Party	Candidate	Votes	%	±%
Conservative	Allan Lawson	785	56.8	+10.7
Conservative	William Wyatt-Lowe	752	54.4	+9.5
Labour	Dawn Barnes	410	29.7	–6.6
Labour	Helen Leach	370	26.8	–9.0
Liberal Democrats	Doreen Coburn	155	11.2	–5.3
Liberal Democrats	Christine Hardy	138	10.0	–3.5
Turnout		~1,382	35.8	+4.0
Registered electors		3,859		
Conservative hold				
Conservative hold				

=== Adeyfield West ===
Adeyfield West (2 seats)
Party	Candidate	Votes	%	±%
Labour	Keith White*	518	41.1	–9.8
Conservative	Keith Reid	508	40.3	+16.8
Labour	Susan White	502	39.8	–9.3
Conservative	Angela Ashdown	481	38.2	+15.8
Liberal Democrats	Sylvia Fry	200	15.9	+2.3
Liberal Democrats	Geoffrey Lawrence	178	14.1	+0.7
Turnout		~1,260	31.1	+3.7
Registered electors		4,051		
Labour hold				
Conservative gain from Labour				

=== Aldbury & Wigginton ===
Aldbury & Wigginton
Party	Candidate	Votes	%	±%
Conservative	Mike Edwards	475	57.0	+8.2
Liberal Democrats	Michael James	306	36.7	+9.8
Labour	Tony Shaw	53	6.4	–2.9
Majority		169	20.3	–1.6
Turnout		834	44.8	+8.7
Registered electors		1,862		
Conservative hold		Swing	▼0.8	

=== Apsley & Corner Hall ===
Apsley & Corner Hall (3 seats)
Party	Candidate	Votes	%
Conservative	Brian Ayling*	1,201	63.2
Conservative	Colin Peter*	1,087	57.2
Conservative	Michael Clark*	1,084	57.0
Labour	Hazel Mackie	367	19.3
Labour	Beryl Milnes	335	17.6
Labour	Michael Sheehan	321	16.9
Liberal Democrats	Ashley Burton	258	13.6
Liberal Democrats	Margaret Waugh	234	12.3
Liberal Democrats	Ian Senior	212	11.2
Green	Jeffrey Fanstone	206	10.8
Turnout		~1,901	31.3
Registered electors		6,075	
Conservative win (new seat)			
Conservative win (new seat)			
Conservative win (new seat)			

=== Ashridge ===
Ashridge
Party	Candidate	Votes	%	±%
Conservative	Nicholas Tiley*	791	74.8	+17.6
Liberal Democrats	Robert Irving	184	17.4	+8.8
Labour	Sharon Greene	83	7.8	+0.8
Majority		607	57.4	+27.4
Turnout		1,058	50.0	+5.9
Registered electors		2,126		
Conservative hold		Swing	▲4.4	

=== Bennetts End ===
Bennetts End (2 seats)
Party	Candidate	Votes	%	±%
Conservative	Michelle Lancaster	721	45.8	+20.4
Conservative	Suqlain Mahmood	655	41.6	+20.2
Labour	Gary Cook*	537	34.1	–23.6
Labour	Bernard Gronert	525	33.3	–22.9
Liberal Democrats	Nicole Daly	206	13.1	–2.7
Liberal Democrats	Alan Waugh	175	11.1	–3.3
Green	Malcolm Waterton	128	8.1	N/A
Turnout		~1,575	35.7	+9.5
Registered electors		4,413		
Conservative gain from Labour				
Conservative gain from Labour				

=== Berkhamsted Castle ===
Berkhamsted Castle (2 seats)
Party	Candidate	Votes	%	±%
Conservative	Andrew Fairburn*	1,049	56.3	+15.5
Conservative	Jonathan Mole	965	51.8	+12.6
Liberal Democrats	Elizabeth Patterson*	721	38.7	–5.4
Liberal Democrats	Victor Earl*	690	37.1	–6.7
Labour	James Mackie	113	6.1	–0.8
Labour	Alan Olive	104	5.6	–0.9
Turnout		~1,862	40.4	+6.0
Registered electors		4,609		
Conservative gain from Liberal Democrats				
Conservative gain from Liberal Democrats				

=== Berkhamsted East ===
Berkhamsted East (2 seats)
Party	Candidate	Votes	%	±%
Conservative	Julie Laws	722	42.3	+4.7
Conservative	Stephen Bateman	698	40.9	+9.1
Liberal Democrats	Philip Gibbs*	627	36.8	–12.2
Liberal Democrats	John Lythgoe*	603	35.3	–13.0
Independent	Norman Cutting	341	20.0	N/A
Green	Anne Duvall	152	8.9	N/A
Labour	Sylvia Shaw	74	4.3	–9.4
Labour	Mary Khamis	73	4.3	–8.9
Turnout		~1,706	38.7	+6.6
Registered electors		4,407		
Conservative gain from Liberal Democrats				
Conservative gain from Liberal Democrats				

=== Berkhamsted West ===
Berkhamsted West (2 seats)
Party	Candidate	Votes	%	±%
Conservative	Carol Green*	860	52.7	+5.0
Conservative	Ian Reay*	837	51.3	+5.0
Liberal Democrats	Geraldine Corry	615	37.7	–4.3
Liberal Democrats	Garrick Stevens	601	36.8	–2.2
Labour	Peter Norman	154	9.4	–1.9
Labour	Natasha Littlechild	123	7.5	–2.8
Turnout		~1,631	39.0	+2.6
Registered electors		4,183		
Conservative hold				
Conservative hold				

=== Bovingdon, Flaunden & Chipperfield ===
Bovingdon, Flaunden & Chipperfield (3 seats)
Party	Candidate	Votes	%	±%
Conservative	Richard Roberts*	1,734	68.1	+11.6
Conservative	Gill Chapman	1,711	67.2	+12.0
Conservative	Gbola Adeleke*	1,450	57.0	+6.8
Independent	Sharon Sims	417	16.4	N/A
Liberal Democrats	David Griffiths	385	15.1	–16.1
Green	Martin Humphrew	280	11.0	+3.5
Liberal Democrats	Rick Martin	252	9.9	–16.5
Liberal Democrats	Barry Batchelor	243	9.5	–15.7
Labour	Richard Milnes	230	9.0	–2.9
Labour	Stephanie Barnes	218	8.6	–3.0
Labour	Scott Stimpson	174	6.8	–4.2
Turnout		~2,546	40.2	+7.2
Registered electors		6,333		
Conservative hold				
Conservative hold				
Conservative hold				

=== Boxmoor ===
Boxmoor (3 seats)
Party	Candidate	Votes	%	±%
Conservative	Janice Marshall*	1,470	57.8	+8.8
Conservative	Neil Harden*	1,430	56.2	+10.5
Conservative	Andrew Williams*	1,306	51.3	N/A
Labour	Julia Coleman	520	20.4	–14.5
Labour	Helen Heenan	429	16.9	–14.8
Labour	Tim Lyle	416	16.4	N/A
Liberal Democrats	Jennifer Simmons	402	15.8	±0.0
Liberal Democrats	Stuart Watkin	375	14.7	+3.5
Liberal Democrats	Ronald Tindall	352	13.8	N/A
Green	Alan Johnson	231	9.1	+2.0
Green	Hazel Johnson	216	8.5	N/A
Turnout		~2,544	41.7	–1.8
Registered electors		6,100		
Conservative hold				
Conservative hold				
Conservative win (new seat)				

=== Chaulden & Warners End ===
Chaulden & Warners End (3 seats)
Party	Candidate	Votes	%
Conservative	Fiona Guest	981	36.8
Conservative	John Whitman	935	35.1
Conservative	Janice Speaight*	931	34.9
Labour	Margaret Coxage	915	34.3
Labour	Ronald Coxage*	824	30.9
Labour	Anne-Lisa Johnsen*	781	29.3
Green	Jane Cousins	327	12.3
National Front	Bernard Franklin	327	12.3
Independent	Julie James	325	12.2
Liberal Democrats	Stephen Wilson	280	10.5
Liberal Democrats	Neil Kennedy	257	9.6
Liberal Democrats	Lynda Roe	256	9.6
Turnout		~2,665	39.5
Registered electors		6,748	
Conservative win (new seat)			
Conservative win (new seat)			
Conservative win (new seat)			

=== Gadebridge ===
Gadebridge (2 seats)
Party	Candidate	Votes	%	±%
Conservative	Roger Taylor	623	45.6	+19.5
Conservative	Jai Restall	554	40.5	+15.5
Labour	Maureen Flint*	527	38.6	–19.3
Labour	Stefan Fisher	434	31.7	–19.0
Liberal Democrats	Andrew Michie	161	11.8	–0.1
Liberal Democrats	Margaret Colquhoun	124	9.1	–2.1
Green	Paul Harris	124	9.1	+0.9
Turnout		~1,367	34.3	+6.5
Registered electors		3,984		
Conservative gain from Labour				
Conservative gain from Labour				

=== Grovehill ===
Grovehill (3 seats)
Party	Candidate	Votes	%	±%
Conservative	Ann Ryan	956	50.6	+13.9
Conservative	Alexander Bhinder	901	47.7	+13.3
Conservative	Terence Douris	889	47.1	+12.9
Labour	An Fisher*	609	32.2	–17.2
Labour	Michael Maloney*	514	27.2	–18.4
Labour	Richard Walsh*	497	26.3	–18.2
Liberal Democrats	John Blackman	229	12.1	–1.2
National Front	Simon Deacon	214	11.3	N/A
Liberal Democrats	Christopher Fryd	154	8.2	–4.8
Liberal Democrats	Martin Rance	147	7.8	–4.2
Turnout		~1,889	32.6	+8.5
Registered electors		5,793		
Conservative gain from Labour				
Conservative gain from Labour				
Conservative gain from Labour				

=== Hemel Hempstead Town ===
Hemel Hempstead Town (2 seats)
Party	Candidate	Votes	%
Labour	Michael Moore	404	36.9
Conservative	Robert Wright	396	36.1
Labour	Ellen Halden	388	35.4
Conservative	Adam Wyatt-Lowe	358	32.7
Liberal Democrats	Christopher Angell	183	16.7
Liberal Democrats	Jean Blackman	181	16.5
Green	Paul Sandford	112	10.2
Turnout		~1,096	29.4
Registered electors		3,728	
Labour win (new seat)			
Conservative win (new seat)			

=== Highfield ===
Highfield (2 seats)
Party	Candidate	Votes	%
Liberal Democrats	Brenda Link	739	48.0
Liberal Democrats	Lloyd Harris	604	39.2
Labour	Elio Gomez*	522	33.9
Labour	Bert Bannister*	488	31.7
Conservative	Kevin Minier	293	19.0
Conservative	Miriam Wiedman-Smith	237	15.4
Turnout		~1,539	38.3
Registered electors		4,018	
Liberal Democrats win (new seat)			
Liberal Democrats win (new seat)			

=== Kings Langley ===
Kings Langley (2 seats)
Party	Candidate	Votes	%	±%
Conservative	Alan Anderson*	1,048	60.4	+10.3
Conservative	Bob McLean	958	55.2	+10.5
Labour	Gerald Angiolini	376	21.7	–17.2
Labour	Eira Mills	309	17.8	–13.9
Green	Jenna Selby	254	14.6	N/A
Liberal Democrats	Michael Morton	187	10.8	–3.4
Liberal Democrats	Gerald Coulter	173	10.0	–2.8
Turnout		~1,734	44.0	+0.2
Registered electors		3,942		
Conservative hold				
Conservative hold				

=== Leverstock Green ===
Leverstock Green (3 seats)
Party	Candidate	Votes	%	±%
Conservative	Hazel Bassadone*	1,624	65.0	+6.0
Conservative	Margaret Griffiths*	1,523	61.0	+5.2
Conservative	Graham Sutton*	1,506	60.3	+5.8
Labour	Douglas Jones	463	18.5	–6.6
Labour	Alan Dickson	448	17.9	–6.6
Labour	Jean Langdon	432	17.3	–5.6
Liberal Democrats	Thomas Potter	290	11.6	–4.9
Liberal Democrats	Sheila Daly	271	10.8	–3.4
Liberal Democrats	Adam Roe	234	9.4	–3.8
Green	Gillian Storey	192	7.7	N/A
Turnout		~2,498	37.0	+3.1
Registered electors		6,751		
Conservative hold				
Conservative hold				
Conservative hold				

=== Nash Mills ===
Nash Mills
Party	Candidate	Votes	%	±%
Conservative	Lucy Foster	511	64.8	+19.5
Labour	Norman Jones	182	23.1	–20.1
Liberal Democrats	Colin Roe	95	12.1	+0.6
Majority		329	41.7	+39.6
Turnout		788	37.8	+0.9
Registered electors		2,095		
Conservative hold		Swing	▲19.8	

=== Northchurch ===
Northchurch
Party	Candidate	Votes	%	±%
Conservative	Alan Fantham*	627	70.0	+12.7
Liberal Democrats	Julian Critcher	203	22.7	–12.4
Labour	Doreen Hills	66	7.4	–0.1
Majority		424	47.3	+25.1
Turnout		896	41.2	+7.9
Registered electors		2,185		
Conservative hold		Swing	▲12.6	

=== Tring Central ===
Tring Central (2 seats)
Party	Candidate	Votes	%	±%
Liberal Democrats	Nicholas Hollingshurst*	824	49.0	–4.9
Liberal Democrats	Denise Rance*	793	47.2	–5.0
Conservative	John Bowden	661	39.3	+0.8
Conservative	Stan Mills*	651	38.8	+5.4
Green	Colin Kruger	156	9.3	N/A
Labour	Douglas Drury	76	4.5	–4.1
Labour	Fran Howat	72	4.3	–3.2
Turnout		~1,680	41.5	+4.4
Registered electors		4,047		
Liberal Democrats hold				
Liberal Democrats hold				

=== Tring East ===
Tring East
Party	Candidate	Votes	%	±%
Conservative	Penelope Hearn	660	63.3	+7.0
Liberal Democrats	Rosemarie Hollinghurst	349	33.5	+3.2
Labour	Philip Gonzalez	33	3.2	–6.1
Majority		311	29.8	+3.8
Turnout		1,042	47.7	+11.9
Registered electors		2,189		
Conservative hold		Swing	▲1.9	

=== Tring West & Rural ===
Tring West & Rural (2 seats)
Party	Candidate	Votes	%
Conservative	Derek Townsend*	919	47.0
Liberal Democrats	Christopher Townsend	895	45.8
Liberal Democrats	John Allan	883	45.2
Conservative	Olive Conway*	866	44.3
Labour	Jan Kalaher	93	4.8
Labour	Frank Burgess	88	4.5
Turnout		~1,955	47.8
Registered electors		4,090	
Conservative win (new seat)			
Liberal Democrats win (new seat)			

=== Watling ===
Watling (2 seats)
Party	Candidate	Votes	%	±%
Conservative	Herbert Chapman*	1,093	73.2	+2.5
Conservative	David Lloyd	1,068	71.5	+1.7
Labour	Joseph Wales	167	11.2	–3.5
Liberal Democrats	Lesley Murray	153	10.2	–1.6
Labour	Kit Wales	152	10.2	–2.6
Liberal Democrats	Angela Thurstan	141	9.4	–1.0
Turnout		~1,494	36.2	+6.1
Registered electors		4,128		
Conservative hold				
Conservative hold				

=== Woodhall Farm ===
Woodhall Farm (2 seats)
Party	Candidate	Votes	%
Conservative	Stephen Holmes*	808	65.9
Conservative	Colette Wyatt-Lowe*	743	60.6
Labour	Sally Anderson	215	17.5
Labour	Barbara Gronert	204	16.6
Green	Helen Batchelor	138	11.2
Liberal Democrats	Daniel Bonnett	115	9.4
Liberal Democrats	Paul Elley	103	8.4
Turnout		~1,227	29.2
Registered electors		4,203	
Conservative win (new seat)			
Conservative win (new seat)			
