= 1995 Dacorum Borough Council election =

1995 UK local government election

- 4 May 1995

All 58 seats to Dacorum Borough Council 30 seats needed for a majority

	First party	Second party
Party	Labour	Conservative
Seats won	33	19
Seat change	▲17	▼19
Popular vote	43,774	29,483
Percentage	46.7%	31.5%
Swing	▲14.9%	▼12.8%
	Third party	Fourth party
Party	Liberal Democrats	Independent
Seats won	4	2
Seat change	Steady	▲2
Popular vote	17,858	1,428
Percentage	19.1%	1.5%
Swing	▼2.4%	▲0.4%
- Winner of each seat at the 1995 Dacorum Borough Council election.
Control before election
Conservative
Control after election
Labour

The 1995 Dacorum Borough Council election took place on 4 May 1995 to elect members of Dacorum Borough Council in Hertfordshire, England. This was on the same day as other local elections.

== Summary ==
=== Election result ===
1995 Dacorum Borough Council election
Party	Candidates	Seats	Gains	Losses	Net gain/loss	Seats %	Votes %	Votes	+/−
Labour	58	33	17	0	▲17	56.9	46.7	43,774	+14.9
Conservative	58	19	0	19	▼19	32.8	31.5	29,483	–12.8
Liberal Democrats	54	4	2	2	Steady	6.9	19.1	17,858	–2.4
Independent	2	2	2	0	▲2	3.4	1.5	1,428	+0.4
Green	2	0	0	0	Steady	0.0	0.7	610	–0.7
Ind. Conservative	1	0	0	0	Steady	0.0	0.3	252	N/A
Independent Labour	1	0	0	0	Steady	0.0	0.2	150	N/A
National Front	2	0	0	0	Steady	0.0	0.1	50	+0.1
Natural Law	1	0	0	0	Steady	0.0	0.1	50	N/A

== Ward results ==
Incumbent councillors standing for re-election are marked with an asterisk (*). Changes in seats do not take into account by-elections or defections.

=== Adeyfield East ===
Adeyfield East (2 seats)
Party	Candidate	Votes	%	±%
Labour	B. Breslin*	1,067	56.8	+19.7
Labour	M. Pesch	999	53.1	+16.2
Conservative	M. Griffiths*	617	32.8	–14.6
Conservative	T. Eastman	613	32.6	–12.2
Liberal Democrats	H. Elsom	143	7.6	–6.1
Liberal Democrats	S. Weston	139	7.4	–5.5
Turnout		~1,880	48.6	+1.2
Registered electors		3,869		
Labour gain from Conservative				
Labour gain from Conservative				

=== Adeyfield West ===
Adeyfield West (3 seats)
Party	Candidate	Votes	%	±%
Labour	L. Taber*	1,182	68.5	+14.0
Labour	R. Haverson*	1,118	64.8	+12.0
Labour	M. Singam	1,019	59.1	+6.8
Conservative	H. Scott	338	19.6	–7.4
Conservative	G. Samuels	330	19.1	–7.4
Conservative	C. Rigal	315	18.3	–6.9
Liberal Democrats	J. Blackman	188	10.9	–4.8
Liberal Democrats	J. Dover	148	8.6	–6.5
Liberal Democrats	M. Bethune	147	8.5	–5.4
Turnout		~1,725	41.0	–6.2
Registered electors		4,208		
Labour hold				
Labour hold				
Labour hold				

=== Aldbury & Wigginton ===
Aldbury & Wigginton
Party	Candidate	Votes	%	±%
Conservative	A. Whitehead*	331	47.4	–11.2
Labour	R. Johnson	220	31.5	+17.6
Liberal Democrats	G. Ransley	147	21.1	–6.3
Majority		111	15.9	–15.3
Turnout		698	39.0	–13.0
Registered electors		1,824		
Conservative hold		Swing	▼14.4	

=== Ashridge ===
Ashridge (2 seats)
Party	Candidate	Votes	%	±%
Conservative	F. Seely*	768	60.9	–8.2
Conservative	B. Gregory*	740	58.7	–4.6
Labour	P. Harris	270	21.4	+2.4
Labour	R. Hutchison	242	19.2	+5.0
Liberal Democrats	I. Dobbs	177	14.0	–5.7
Liberal Democrats	P. Worth	168	13.2	N/A
Turnout		~1,261	45.0	–7.0
Registered electors		2,802		
Conservative hold				
Conservative hold				

=== Bennetts End ===
Bennetts End (3 seats)
Party	Candidate	Votes	%	±%
Labour	G. Cook	1,186	69.6	+13.9
Labour	S. Harrison*	1,162	68.2	+12.7
Labour	A. Maclaughlin*	1,124	65.9	+12.2
Conservative	A. Craigen	330	19.4	–8.2
Conservative	D. Fell	326	19.1	–7.6
Conservative	S. Todd	303	17.8	–8.4
Liberal Democrats	C. Roe	137	8.0	–5.2
Liberal Democrats	S. Wilson	133	7.8	–5.2
Liberal Democrats	A. Khan	131	7.7	–4.6
Turnout		~1,705	40.9	–4.7
Registered electors		4,170		
Labour hold				
Labour hold				
Labour hold				

=== Berkhamsted Central ===
Berkhamsted Central (2 seats)
Party	Candidate	Votes	%	±%
Conservative	J. Dunbavand*	704	36.2	–17.9
Conservative	K. Coleman*	701	36.1	–17.6
Liberal Democrats	B. Patterson	658	33.9	+6.1
Liberal Democrats	G. Corry	585	30.1	+3.5
Labour	J. Egan	520	26.8	+14.8
Labour	C. Wareham	446	23.0	+15.8
Turnout		~1,943	47.0	+1.0
Registered electors		4,135		
Conservative hold				
Conservative hold				

=== Berkhamsted East ===
Berkhamsted East (3 seats)
Party	Candidate	Votes	%	±%
Independent	N. Cutting	731	33.4	N/A
Liberal Democrats	J. Lythgoe	610	27.9	+4.4
Conservative	P. Ginger*	600	27.4	–21.6
Conservative	J. Ford-Smith	597	27.3	–16.1
Labour	D. Freeman	586	26.8	+4.2
Liberal Democrats	G. Stevens	577	26.4	+6.5
Liberal Democrats	M. Martin	546	24.9	+5.1
Conservative	I. Reay	541	24.7	–18.5
Labour	K. Bayliss	541	24.7	+6.7
Labour	S. Taylor	480	21.9	+4.5
Independent Labour	W. Carlile-Stitson	150	6.9	–1.6
Turnout		~2,189	47.0	+1.8
Registered electors		4,657		
Independent gain from Conservative				
Liberal Democrats gain from Conservative				
Conservative hold				

=== Berkhamsted West ===
Berkhamsted West (2 seats)
Party	Candidate	Votes	%	±%
Liberal Democrats	S. Sharpe*	741	47.5	–5.1
Liberal Democrats	J. Brooks	713	45.7	+0.9
Labour	J. Gilbert	398	25.5	+13.6
Labour	P. Donnelly	377	24.2	+14.0
Conservative	H. Rost	341	21.9	–10.0
Conservative	C. Whittick	322	20.6	–9.3
Turnout		~1,560	47.0	–7.3
Registered electors		3,320		
Liberal Democrats hold				
Liberal Democrats hold				

=== Bovingdon & Flaunden ===
Bovingdon & Flaunden (2 seats)
Party	Candidate	Votes	%	±%
Conservative	A. Janes*	675	43.4	–22.5
Conservative	R. McLellan*	623	40.0	–21.5
Labour	M. Beer	457	29.4	–0.4
Labour	B. May	378	24.3	–3.3
Liberal Democrats	I. Galbraith	324	20.8	N/A
Liberal Democrats	D. Griffiths	303	19.5	N/A
Turnout		~1,556	41.4	–1.4
Registered electors		3,761		
Conservative hold				
Conservative hold				

=== Boxmoor ===
Boxmoor (3 seats)
Party	Candidate	Votes	%	±%
Labour	M. Hutchison	961	41.4	+12.4
Labour	A. Johnsen	937	40.4	+13.3
Labour	W. Killen	933	40.2	+13.5
Conservative	J. Buteux*	917	39.5	–8.3
Conservative	J. Marshall*	917	39.5	–4.7
Conservative	E. Buteux	863	37.2	–6.4
Liberal Democrats	J. Richardson	383	16.5	–6.6
Liberal Democrats	C. Robins	383	16.5	–5.2
Liberal Democrats	R. Pexton	340	14.7	–4.9
Natural Law	D. Harding	50	2.2	N/A
Turnout		~2,319	47.0	–4.2
Registered electors		4,934		
Labour gain from Conservative				
Labour gain from Conservative				
Labour gain from Conservative				

=== Central ===
Central (2 seats)
Party	Candidate	Votes	%	±%
Conservative	A. Williams*	649	42.4	–0.6
Conservative	C. Appleby*	607	39.7	–2.4
Labour	K. Greene	537	35.1	+16.3
Labour	H. Seelig	532	34.8	+18.2
Liberal Democrats	A. Winter	306	20.0	–17.5
Liberal Democrats	D. Podesta	281	18.4	–15.7
Turnout		~1,529	38.0	–7.6
Registered electors		4,024		
Conservative hold				
Conservative hold				

=== Chaulden ===
Chaulden
Party	Candidate	Votes	%	±%
Labour	A. Dennison*	796	72.6	+19.1
Conservative	C. Peter	196	17.9	–15.9
Liberal Democrats	W. Hulks	84	7.7	–3.6
National Front	J. McAuley	21	1.9	+0.5
Majority		600	54.7	+35.0
Turnout		1,097	50.7	–5.2
Registered electors		2,186		
Labour hold		Swing	▲17.5	

=== Chipperfield ===
Chipperfield
Party	Candidate	Votes	%	±%
Conservative	J. Nichols*	389	66.3	–8.2
Labour	S. Lister	198	33.7	+8.2
Majority		191	32.6	–16.4
Turnout		587	44.0	–7.9
Registered electors		1,366		
Conservative hold		Swing	▼8.2	

=== Crabtree ===
Crabtree (3 seats)
Party	Candidate	Votes	%	±%
Labour	D. Bennett	1,252	62.4	+23.0
Labour	M. Quinn	1,190	59.3	+20.5
Labour	K. White	1,166	58.1	+25.8
Conservative	B. Griffiths*	481	24.0	–20.2
Conservative	S. Healy	473	23.6	–20.3
Conservative	R. Stanton	471	23.5	–18.3
Liberal Democrats	S. Hastings	236	11.8	–2.0
Liberal Democrats	L. Roe	220	11.0	–0.9
Liberal Democrats	M. Thompson	207	10.3	N/A
National Front	R. Croucher	29	1.4	N/A
Turnout		~2,008	40.0	–6.4
Registered electors		5,021		
Labour gain from Conservative				
Labour gain from Conservative				
Labour gain from Conservative				

=== Cupid Green ===
Cupid Green (2 seats)
Party	Candidate	Votes	%	±%
Labour	B. Fisher*	719	51.1	+24.0
Labour	M. Young*	634	45.1	+19.1
Conservative	A. Gallagher	436	31.0	–21.0
Conservative	M. Griffiths	429	30.5	–20.2
Liberal Democrats	W. Savage	211	15.0	–1.9
Liberal Democrats	J. Blackman	203	14.4	–1.1
Turnout		~1,406	30.0	–8.5
Registered electors		4,685		
Labour gain from Conservative				
Labour gain from Conservative				

=== Flamstead & Markyate ===
Flamstead & Markyate (2 seats)
Party	Candidate	Votes	%	±%
Conservative	H. Chapman	688	54.6	–0.4
Conservative	J. Taunton*	685	54.4	+1.6
Labour	M. El-Rayes	348	27.6	+8.7
Labour	D. Moss	332	26.3	+8.2
Liberal Democrats	J. Davies	141	11.2	–3.1
Liberal Democrats	R. Kelly	116	9.2	–3.7
Turnout		~1,260	38.0	–9.3
Registered electors		3,316		
Conservative hold				
Conservative hold				

=== Gadebridge ===
Gadebridge (2 seats)
Party	Candidate	Votes	%	±%
Labour	M. Flint*	1,182	79.0	+23.0
Labour	M. Presland	1,073	71.7	+24.4
Conservative	H. Watson	266	17.8	–6.3
Conservative	A. Williams	260	17.4	–6.2
Turnout		~1,497	41.9	–5.1
Registered electors		3,573		
Labour hold				
Labour hold				

=== Grove Hill ===
Grove Hill (3 seats)
Party	Candidate	Votes	%	±%
Labour	A. Fisher*	1,228	66.4	+30.2
Labour	P. Hinson*	1,169	63.2	+28.6
Labour	M. Maloney	1,064	57.5	+24.6
Conservative	A. Fairburn	330	17.8	–12.4
Conservative	K. Reid	306	16.5	–13.4
Conservative	S. Sullivan	274	14.8	–14.0
Liberal Democrats	S. Chateris	223	12.1	–18.0
Liberal Democrats	A. Waugh	191	10.3	–16.6
Liberal Democrats	M. Rance	167	9.0	–16.8
Green	P. Craddock	113	6.1	N/A
Turnout		~1,850	33.0	–4.6
Registered electors		5,605		
Labour hold				
Labour hold				
Labour hold				

=== Highfield ===
Highfield (3 seats)
Party	Candidate	Votes	%	±%
Labour	M. Ewing	927	49.2	+2.4
Labour	T. Ewing	926	49.2	+10.9
Labour	D. Clarke	920	48.9	+15.9
Liberal Democrats	G. Lawrence*	765	40.6	+5.2
Liberal Democrats	G. Hanson	747	39.7	+9.8
Liberal Democrats	R. Cottrell	746	39.6	+11.9
Conservative	A. Lindley	148	7.9	–13.1
Conservative	M. Jameson	143	7.6	–9.4
Conservative	G. Reid	125	6.6	–9.1
Turnout		~1,883	41.0	–4.9
Registered electors		4,592		
Labour hold				
Labour hold				
Labour gain from Liberal Democrats				

=== Kings Langley ===
Kings Langley (2 seats)
Party	Candidate	Votes	%	±%
Labour	A. Gale	964	50.4	+20.2
Labour	P. Caulfield	846	44.2	+19.6
Conservative	K. Andrew	547	28.6	–24.8
Conservative	R. Hill	444	23.2	–26.7
Liberal Democrats	I. Senior	335	17.5	–0.3
Liberal Democrats	M. Morton	324	16.9	+1.2
Ind. Conservative	M. Sharp	252	13.2	N/A
Turnout		~1,912	50.0	+1.1
Registered electors		3,824		
Labour gain from Conservative				
Labour gain from Conservative				

=== Leverstock Green ===
Leverstock Green (3 seats)
Party	Candidate	Votes	%	±%
Labour	C. Letanka	1,042	43.2	+15.7
Labour	B. Rubin	1,030	42.7	+15.7
Conservative	H. Bassadone*	997	41.4	–13.6
Labour	R. Hebborn	938	38.9	+14.7
Conservative	J. Hanson*	909	37.7	–14.0
Conservative	C. Cadman*	907	37.6	–13.3
Liberal Democrats	S. Daly	291	12.1	–4.9
Liberal Democrats	R. Charteris	232	9.6	–6.7
Liberal Democrats	K. Hastings	210	8.7	–6.0
Turnout		~2,411	45.4	–3.5
Registered electors		5,310		
Labour gain from Conservative				
Labour gain from Conservative				
Conservative hold				

=== Nash Mills ===
Nash Mills
Party	Candidate	Votes	%	±%
Labour	H. Thomson	396	47.3	+15.1
Conservative	H. Korman*	386	46.1	–7.9
Liberal Democrats	R. Willson	55	6.6	–7.2
Majority		10	1.2	N/A
Turnout		837	55.0	–3.1
Registered electors		1,584		
Labour gain from Conservative		Swing	▲11.5	

=== Northchurch ===
Northchurch
Party	Candidate	Votes	%	±%
Conservative	D. Moore*	378	41.3	–17.4
Liberal Democrats	I. McCalla	282	30.8	+9.4
Labour	S. Tupper	256	27.9	+15.7
Majority		96	10.5	–26.8
Turnout		916	45.0	–3.4
Registered electors		2,084		
Conservative hold		Swing	▼13.4	

=== South ===
South
Party	Candidate	Votes	%	±%
Conservative	P. Beale*	609	53.3	–8.1
Labour	V. Leathwood	372	32.5	+12.6
Liberal Democrats	M. Hawgood	162	14.2	–4.5
Majority		237	20.8	–20.7
Turnout		1,143	39.6	–8.2
Registered electors		2,937		
Conservative hold		Swing	▼10.4	

=== Tring Central ===
Tring Central (2 seats)
Party	Candidate	Votes	%	±%
Independent	R. Halling	697	36.7	N/A
Liberal Democrats	D. Rance	578	30.5	–5.4
Conservative	P. Noel*	571	30.1	–12.7
Conservative	M. Jackson*	550	29.0	–8.1
Liberal Democrats	B. Fox	436	23.0	–5.2
Labour	P. Aldis	369	19.5	+6.4
Labour	M. Fountain	353	18.6	+7.4
Turnout		~1,897	45.0	–3.7
Registered electors		4,215		
Independent gain from Conservative				
Liberal Democrats gain from Conservative				

=== Tring East ===
Tring East
Party	Candidate	Votes	%	±%
Conservative	J. Jameson*	534	60.0	–6.1
Liberal Democrats	N. Hollinghurst	190	21.3	+1.2
Labour	P. Carter	166	18.7	+11.4
Majority		344	38.7	–7.3
Turnout		890	52.0	–6.8
Registered electors		1,753		
Conservative hold		Swing	▼3.7	

=== Tring West ===
Tring West (2 seats)
Party	Candidate	Votes	%	±%
Conservative	D. Townsend*	736	38.2	–14.2
Conservative	S. Mills	725	37.6	–14.3
Labour	R. Dickenson	544	28.2	+9.3
Green	D. Metcalfe	497	25.8	+6.0
Labour	R. Lovelace	471	24.4	+8.1
Liberal Democrats	C. Fryd	451	23.4	+5.7
Turnout		~1,929	51.0	–0.9
Registered electors		3,782		
Conservative hold				
Conservative hold				

=== Warners End ===
Warners End (3 seats)
Party	Candidate	Votes	%	±%
Labour	M. Coxage*	1,170	54.2	+20.9
Labour	J. Coleman*	1,151	53.3	+20.6
Labour	R. Moss	910	42.1	+10.5
Liberal Democrats	J. Sweetingham*	633	29.3	–4.1
Liberal Democrats	K. Carrington	521	24.1	–7.6
Liberal Democrats	C. Richardson	493	22.8	–7.8
Conservative	J. Gittins	392	18.1	–11.5
Conservative	J. Framp	329	15.2	–12.5
Conservative	H. Verkade	301	13.9	–12.5
Turnout		~2,160	44.6	–9.4
Registered electors		4,842		
Labour hold				
Labour hold				
Labour gain from Liberal Democrats				
