= The Forum, Hemel Hempstead =

Commercial building in Hemel Hempstead, England

The Forum
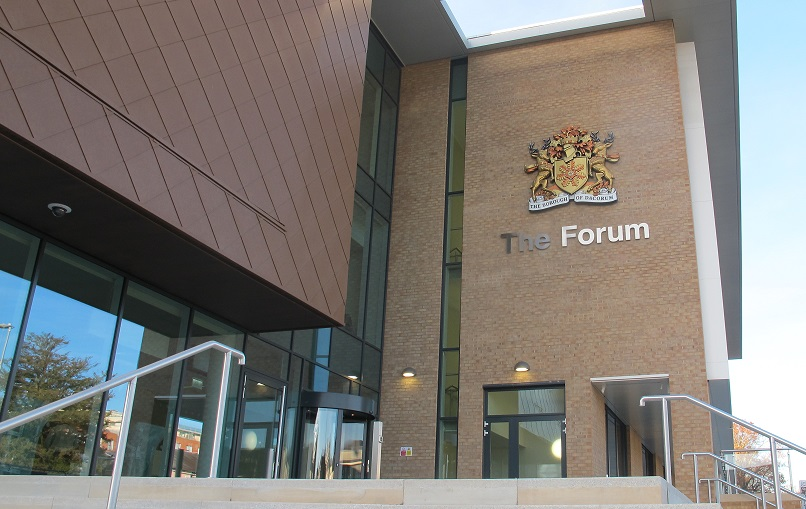
- The Forum

- Shown in Hertfordshire
- 51.7541°N 0.4731°W
- Location: Marlowes, Hemel Hempstead

History
- Built: 2017

Site notes
- Architect: Aukett Swanke
- Architectural style: Modernist style

The Forum is a municipal building in Marlowes, Hemel Hempstead, Hertfordshire, England. The building accommodates the meeting place and offices of Dacorum Borough Council as well as the local library.

== History ==
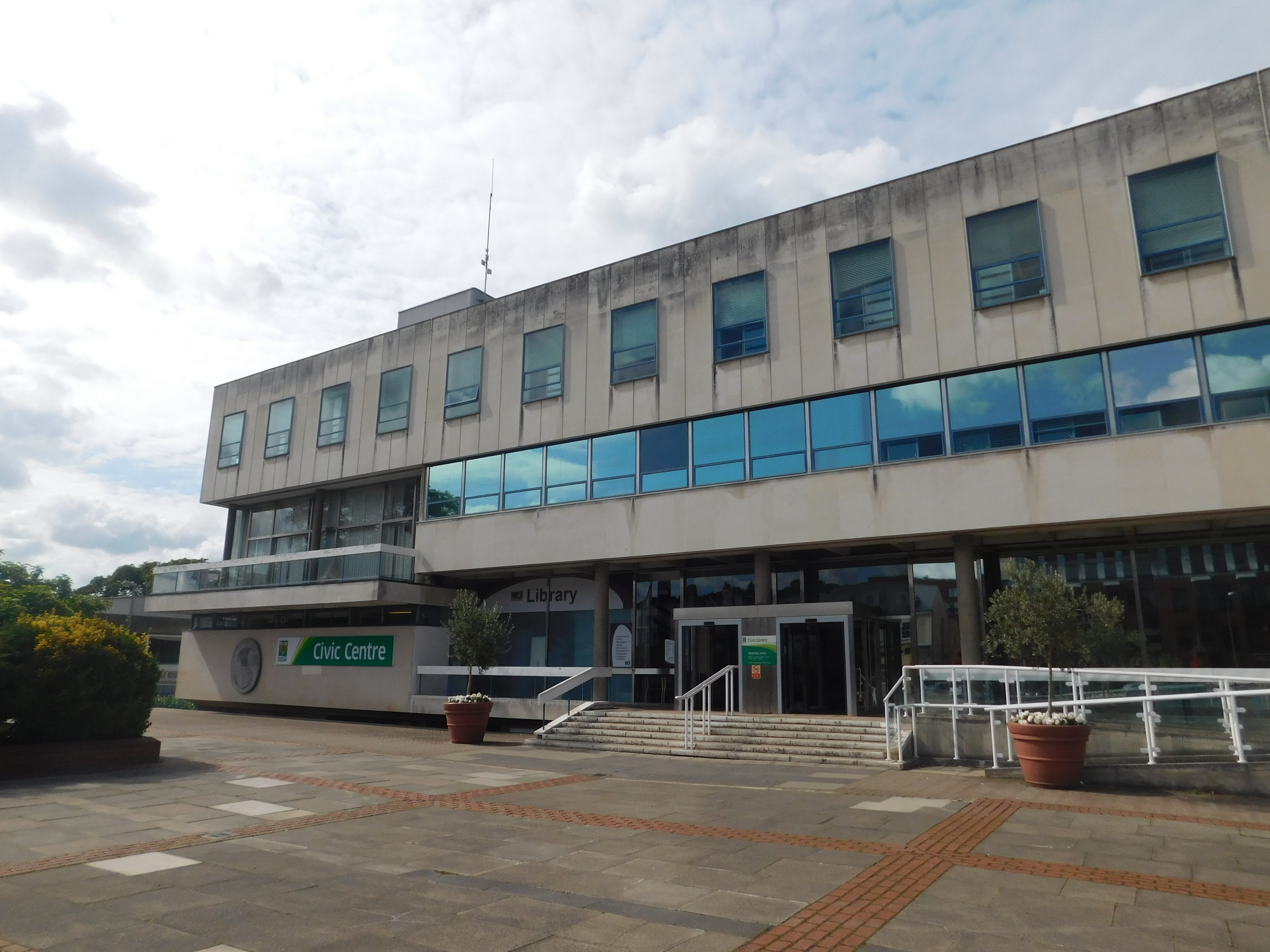
The old Hemel Hempstead Civic Centre, now demolished

The first significant municipal building in Hemel Hempstead was the Old Town Hall which was completed in 1851. The town hall continued to serve as the headquarters of the local municipal borough council for much of the 20th century but ceased to be the local seat of government after a new civic centre, designed by Clifford Culpin and Partners, was erected in Marlowes and completed in 1966. The civic centre became the home of Dacorum Borough Council when it was formed in 1974.

By 2015, the civic centre was in a dilapidated condition and, after being advised that it would cost £5 million to refurbish the old building, the borough council decided to commission a new structure. The site chosen by civic leaders was a vacant area on the corner of Coombe Street and Marlowes, to the south of the old civic centre. It had been occupied by an events venue known as The Pavilion which had also been designed by Clifford Culpin and Partners and completed in 1966. After it ceased to be financially viable as an events venue, the Pavilion closed in June 2002 and was demolished shortly afterwards.

The new building was designed by Aukett Swanke in the Modernist style, built by R. G. Carter Construction in dark red brick at a cost of £15 million and was officially opened by the leader of the council, Councillor Andrew Williams, on 16 January 2017. The design involved an asymmetric main frontage of six bays facing onto Marlowes. The left-hand bay, which was recessed, featured a short flight of steps leading up to a glass entrance with dark red cladding spanning the first and second floors and with prominent overhanging eaves. The borough coat of arms was erected on the wall to the right of the entrance. Internally, the principal areas were the council chamber and offices on the first floor, and a space for the new library, which had previously been based in Coombe Street, on the ground floor.

The old civic centre was demolished in summer 2019, and a new housing development known as "The Gade", involving a series of apartment blocks, was subsequently erected on that site.
