= 2019 Dacorum Borough Council election =

2019 English local election

- 2 May 2019

All 51 seats to Dacorum Borough Council 26 seats needed for a majority
- Turnout: 34.5%

	First party	Second party
Party	Conservative	Liberal Democrats
Last election	46 seats, 53.8%	3 seats, 15.1%
Seats before	46	3
Seats won	31	19
Seat change	▼15	▲16
Popular vote	33,773	25,048
Percentage	42.6%	31.6%
Swing	▼11.2%	▲16.5%
	Third party	Fourth party
Party	Independent	Labour
Last election	0 seats, 0.2%	2 seats, 16.7%
Seats before	0	2
Seats won	1	0
Seat change	▲1	▼2
Popular vote	600	12,252
Percentage	0.8%	15.5%
Swing	▲0.6%	▼1.2%
- Ward results of the 2019 Dacorum Borough Council election.
Control before election
Andrew Williams
Conservative
Control after election
Andrew Williams
Conservative

The 2019 Dacorum Borough Council election took place on 2 May 2019 to elect members of the Dacorum Borough Council in Hertfordshire, England. It was held on the same day as other local elections.

== Summary ==
=== Election result ===
2019 Dacorum Borough Council election
Party	Candidates	Seats	Gains	Losses	Net gain/loss	Seats %	Votes %	Votes	+/−
Conservative	51	31	1	16	▼15	60.8	42.6	33,773	–11.2
Liberal Democrats	51	19	16	0	▲16	37.3	31.6	25,048	+16.5
Independent	1	1	1	0	▲1	2.0	0.8	600	+0.6
Labour	42	0	0	2	▼2	0.0	15.5	12,252	–1.2
Green	20	0	0	0	Steady	0.0	8.0	6,297	+1.5
UKIP	6	0	0	0	Steady	0.0	1.5	1,220	–6.3

== Ward results ==
Incumbent councillors standing for re-election are marked with an asterisk (*). Changes in seats do not take into account by-elections or defections.

=== Adeyfield East ===
Adeyfield East (2 seats)
Party	Candidate	Votes	%	±%
Conservative	John Birnie*	594	47.6	+5.6
Conservative	Andrew Williams*	569	45.6	+4.2
Labour	Gary Cook	299	24.0	–2.3
Labour	Helen Heenan	284	22.8	+6.3
UKIP	Noel Swinford	200	16.0	–7.1
Green	Samuel Deering	159	12.7	+5.2
Liberal Democrats	Anna Purvis	102	8.2	+2.0
Liberal Democrats	Joan Robinson	95	7.6	+3.5
Turnout		1,248	30.0	–31.8
Rejected ballots		11	0.9	
Registered electors		4,112		
Conservative hold				
Conservative hold				

=== Adeyfield West ===
Adeyfield West (2 seats)
Party	Candidate	Votes	%	±%
Liberal Democrats	Adrian England	752	61.1	+34.0
Liberal Democrats	Ron Tindall*	705	57.3	+39.7
Conservative	Tony Gallagher	247	20.1	–8.8
Conservative	Adam Wyatt-Lowe	208	16.9	–9.9
Labour	Stephen Rees	189	15.4	–1.7
Labour	Ray York	179	14.5	N/A
Turnout		1,231	29.0	–32.7
Rejected ballots		29	2.4	
Registered electors		4,186		
Liberal Democrats gain from Conservative				
Liberal Democrats hold				

=== Aldbury & Wigginton ===
Aldbury & Wigginton
Party	Candidate	Votes	%	±%
Liberal Democrats	Phil McDowell	522	63.1	+22.4
Conservative	Stan Mills*	305	36.9	–6.9
Majority		217	26.2	N/A
Turnout		847	44.0	–32.3
Rejected ballots		20	2.4	
Registered electors		1,909		
Liberal Democrats gain from Conservative		Swing	▲14.7	

=== Apsley & Corner Hall ===
Apsley & Corner Hall (3 seats)
Party	Candidate	Votes	%	±%
Conservative	Colin Peter*	840	43.2	+7.9
Conservative	Suqlain Mahmood*	747	38.4	+4.1
Conservative	Babita Sinha	734	37.7	+5.9
Labour	Emily Jacques	519	26.7	+4.0
Labour	Jody Whitehill	497	25.5	+3.6
Liberal Democrats	David Bird	482	24.8	+10.8
Labour	Sandy Palmer	465	23.9	N/A
Liberal Democrats	Emma Macey	447	23.0	N/A
Liberal Democrats	Fran Parkins	440	22.6	N/A
Turnout		1,946	28.0	–43.9
Rejected ballots		48	2.5	
Registered electors		7,004		
Conservative hold				
Conservative hold				
Conservative hold				

=== Ashridge ===
Ashridge
Party	Candidate	Votes	%	±%
Conservative	Terry Douris*	671	69.4	–4.2
Liberal Democrats	Dina Westenholz-Smith	228	23.6	+15.1
Labour	Jennifer O'Leary	68	7.0	–4.5
Majority		443	45.8	–16.3
Turnout		979	46.0	–33.3
Rejected ballots		12	1.2	
Registered electors		2,122		
Conservative hold		Swing	▼9.7	

=== Bennetts End ===
Bennetts End (2 seats)
Party	Candidate	Votes	%	±%
Conservative	Sobaan Mahmood	538	36.1	–2.8
Conservative	Mark Rogers	529	35.5	+2.4
Labour	Amanda Tattershall	485	32.6	+3.6
Labour	Ijlal Malik	479	32.2	+5.3
Liberal Democrats	Sarah Bell	248	16.7	+9.2
Green	David Lillywhite	238	16.0	+6.8
Liberal Democrats	Chris Lloyd-Staples	192	12.9	N/A
Turnout		1,489	33.0	–33.3
Rejected ballots		14	0.9	
Registered electors		4,547		
Conservative hold				
Conservative hold				

=== Berkhamsted Castle ===
Berkhamsted Castle (2 seats)
Party	Candidate	Votes	%	±%
Liberal Democrats	Rick Freedman	1,078	52.0	+19.9
Liberal Democrats	Stephen Claughton	1,004	48.4	+30.3
Conservative	Sue Beardshaw	640	30.8	–22.9
Conservative	David Collins*	613	29.5	–17.2
Green	Paul de Hoest	399	19.2	–3.6
Labour	Gill Spooner	151	7.3	N/A
Labour	James Spooner	90	4.3	N/A
Turnout		2,075	45.0	–31.0
Rejected ballots		28	1.3	
Registered electors		4,648		
Liberal Democrats gain from Conservative				
Liberal Democrats gain from Conservative				

=== Berkhamsted East ===
Berkhamsted East (2 seats)
Party	Candidate	Votes	%	±%
Liberal Democrats	Garrick Stevens	1,139	59.6	+29.9
Liberal Democrats	Nigel Taylor	824	43.1	+23.8
Conservative	Tracy Porter	515	26.9	–16.8
Green	Rebecca MacKenzie	469	24.5	+9.3
Conservative	David Ward	395	20.7	–21.7
Labour	Sian Cusack	231	12.1	–7.2
Turnout		1,910	41.0	–32.5
Rejected ballots		21	1.1	
Registered electors		4,672		
Liberal Democrats gain from Conservative				
Liberal Democrats gain from Conservative				

=== Berkhamsted West ===
Berkhamsted West (2 seats)
Party	Candidate	Votes	%	±%
Liberal Democrats	Sally Symington	966	53.6	+34.9
Liberal Democrats	Nicky Woolner	871	48.4	+33.0
Conservative	Anthony Armytage	533	29.6	–22.0
Conservative	Peter Matthews*	482	26.8	–21.5
Green	Mary Hardinge	286	15.9	+2.5
Labour	Patrick Emery	140	7.8	–9.0
Labour	Steve Burdekin	121	6.7	–6.0
Turnout		1,801	38.0	–33.9
Rejected ballots		33	1.8	
Registered electors		4,726		
Liberal Democrats gain from Conservative				
Liberal Democrats gain from Conservative				

=== Bovingdon, Flaunden & Chipperfield ===
Bovingdon, Flaunden & Chipperfield (3 seats)
Party	Candidate	Votes	%	±%
Conservative	Graham Barrett	1,311	61.1	–3.1
Conservative	Stewart Riddick*	1,196	55.8	–3.0
Conservative	Gbola Adeleke*	1,075	50.1	–7.5
Green	Wiebke Carr	671	31.3	+11.9
Liberal Democrats	Denise Rance	445	20.7	+9.9
Liberal Democrats	Beth Townsend	415	19.4	+11.0
Liberal Democrats	Malcolm Rogers	365	17.0	+9.8
Labour	Gerard Wilkinson	238	11.1	–3.7
Turnout		2,145	33.0	–39.8
Rejected ballots		33	1.5	
Registered electors		6,566		
Conservative hold				
Conservative hold				
Conservative hold				

=== Boxmoor ===
Boxmoor (3 seats)
Party	Candidate	Votes	%	±%
Liberal Democrats	William Allen	1,287	44.8	+27.5
Liberal Democrats	Claire Hobson	1,232	42.9	+30.7
Liberal Democrats	Liz Uttley	1,117	38.9	N/A
Conservative	Janice Marshall*	968	33.7	–14.2
Conservative	Neil Harden*	898	31.3	–10.2
Conservative	William Wyatt-Lowe	848	29.5	–8.7
Labour	Cameron Brady-Turner	427	14.9	–6.2
Green	Sherief Hassan	367	12.8	–4.1
Labour	Barbara Pesch	326	11.4	–4.5
Green	Bernard Hurley	281	9.8	N/A
Labour	Michael Pesch	260	9.1	N/A
Green	Robert Theophile	255	8.9	N/A
Turnout		2,874	42.0	–29.6
Rejected ballots		30	1.0	
Registered electors		6,809		
Liberal Democrats gain from Conservative				
Liberal Democrats gain from Conservative				
Liberal Democrats gain from Conservative				

=== Chaulden & Warners End ===
Chaulden & Warners End (3 seats)
Party	Candidate	Votes	%	±%
Conservative	Fiona Guest*	1,168	51.7	+8.8
Conservative	Nigel Durrant	1,071	47.5	+6.3
Conservative	Graeme Elliot*	1,060	47.0	+7.0
Labour	Jean Langdon	516	22.9	–2.7
Labour	Clive Mills	469	20.8	–2.1
Labour	Rachael Frost	413	18.3	–3.7
Liberal Democrats	Diane Wilson	405	17.9	+10.0
Green	Sam Buckton	358	15.9	+5.0
Liberal Democrats	Claire Nicholls	280	12.4	+5.6
Liberal Democrats	Gill Broadbent	276	12.2	+8.4
Turnout		2,257	34.0	–33.6
Rejected ballots		42	1.9	
Registered electors		6,735		
Conservative hold				
Conservative hold				
Conservative hold				

=== Gadebridge ===
Gadebridge (2 seats)
Party	Candidate	Votes	%	±%
Conservative	Isy Imarni*	482	42.6	+1.5
Conservative	Pearl Oguchi	463	40.9	+7.1
Labour	Lee Whitehill	290	25.6	–0.2
Labour	Zahoor Iqbal	268	23.7	+0.4
Green	Suzanne Watts	198	17.5	+9.2
Liberal Democrats	Chris Angell	186	16.4	+11.4
Liberal Democrats	Lynda Roe	180	15.9	+12.7
Turnout		1,132	27.0	–39.0
Rejected ballots		19	1.7	
Registered electors		4,142		
Conservative hold				
Conservative hold				

=== Grovehill ===
Grovehill (3 seats)
Party	Candidate	Votes	%	±%
Conservative	Julie Banks	851	51.1	+6.5
Conservative	Alex Bhinder*	846	50.8	+9.4
Conservative	Goverdhan Silwal	724	43.5	+10.3
Labour	Pat Dartnell	332	20.0	–5.0
Labour	Vicky Martin	325	19.5	–3.2
UKIP	Karen Hall	266	16.0	–13.0
Labour	Helen Whitworth	263	15.8	N/A
Green	Paul Sandford	241	14.5	+2.4
UKIP	Silvi Sutherland	238	14.3	N/A
Liberal Democrats	Margaret Colquhoun	153	9.2	+0.7
Liberal Democrats	Steve Thornhill	141	8.5	+3.6
Liberal Democrats	Angela Thurstan	139	8.4	N/A
Turnout		1,664	29.0	–31.4
Rejected ballots		5	0.3	
Registered electors		5,647		
Conservative hold				
Conservative hold				
Conservative hold				

=== Hemel Hempstead Town ===
Hemel Hempstead Town (2 seats)
Party	Candidate	Votes	%	±%
Conservative	Frances Arslan	364	28.1	–12.1
Conservative	Rob Beauchamp	356	27.5	–2.5
Labour	Anne Fisher*	349	26.9	–4.9
Liberal Democrats	Joe Toovey	345	26.6	+15.0
Labour	Samidha Garg	314	24.2	–3.8
Liberal Democrats	Steve Wilson	306	23.6	+14.0
Green	Joe Pitts-Cunningham	193	14.9	N/A
UKIP	Michelle Smith	177	13.7	–4.1
Turnout		1,296	28.0	–30.2
Rejected ballots		8	0.6	
Registered electors		4,566		
Conservative hold				
Conservative gain from Labour				

=== Highfield ===
Highfield (2 seats)
Party	Candidate	Votes	%	±%
Liberal Democrats	Brenda Link*	541	42.0	+14.5
Liberal Democrats	Sammy Barry	504	39.2	+21.2
Labour	Luke Jordan	337	26.2	–2.2
Labour	Vanessa Mitchell	311	24.2	N/A
Conservative	Louise Douris	230	17.9	–4.9
UKIP	James Froggatt	194	15.1	–10.3
Conservative	Charlotte Palmer	185	14.4	–8.2
Turnout		1,285	32.0	–27.8
Rejected ballots		7	0.5	
Registered electors		4,059		
Liberal Democrats hold				
Liberal Democrats gain from Labour				

=== Kings Langley ===
Kings Langley (2 seats)
Party	Candidate	Votes	%	±%
Conservative	Alan Anderson*	745	52.5	–4.2
Conservative	Alan Johnson	738	52.0	+4.4
Green	Ashley Lawrence	394	27.8	+8.9
Liberal Democrats	Ian Senior	285	20.1	+4.5
Liberal Democrats	Faith Thornhill	166	11.7	N/A
Labour	John Collisson	140	9.9	–16.0
Labour	Dominic Hook	131	9.2	N/A
Turnout		1,419	35.0	–38.1
Rejected ballots		14	1.0	
Registered electors		4,032		
Conservative hold				
Conservative hold				

=== Leverstock Green ===
Leverstock Green (3 seats)
Party	Candidate	Votes	%	±%
Conservative	Hazel Bassadone*	1,211	54.6	+2.6
Conservative	Margaret Griffiths*	1,133	51.1	+8.3
Conservative	Graham Sutton*	1,092	49.2	+10.3
Labour	Ann Lang	514	23.2	–2.4
Labour	Emma Reed	435	19.6	N/A
Green	Mark Rutherford	409	18.4	+2.2
Liberal Democrats	Eileen Heylin	404	18.2	+2.8
Labour	Michael Sheehan	374	16.9	N/A
Liberal Democrats	Mike Heylin	335	15.1	N/A
Liberal Democrats	Abigail Waymont	245	11.0	N/A
Turnout		2,219	31.0	–37.1
Rejected ballots		18	0.8	
Registered electors		7,141		
Conservative hold				
Conservative hold				
Conservative hold				

=== Nash Mills ===
Nash Mills
Party	Candidate	Votes	%	±%
Independent	Jan Maddern*	600	63.8	N/A
Conservative	Rene De Silva	156	16.6	–34.7
Liberal Democrats	Alex Bell	95	10.1	+4.5
Labour	Bernard Gronert	86	9.1	–14.1
Majority		444	47.2	N/A
Turnout		941	34.0	–33.2
Rejected ballots		1	0.1	
Registered electors		2,808		
Independent gain from Conservative				

=== Northchurch ===
Northchurch
Party	Candidate	Votes	%	±%
Liberal Democrats	Lara Pringle	623	65.9	+47.1
Conservative	Tina Howard	220	23.3	–37.0
Green	Malcolm Cathcart	61	6.5	–2.2
Labour	Gwendoline Scott	41	4.3	–7.9
Majority		403	42.6	N/A
Turnout		953	42.0	–31.7
Rejected ballots		8	0.8	
Registered electors		2,252		
Liberal Democrats gain from Conservative		Swing	▲42.1	

=== Tring Central ===
Tring Central (2 seats)
Party	Candidate	Votes	%	±%
Liberal Democrats	Roxanne Ransley*	730	50.2	+12.1
Liberal Democrats	John Bowden	570	39.2	+2.8
Conservative	Stephen Hearn	461	31.7	–15.6
Conservative	Phil Hills	350	24.1	–13.6
Green	Mary Hodgskiss	319	22.0	+6.4
UKIP	Mark Anderson	145	10.0	N/A
Labour	Geraint Cooksley	135	9.3	N/A
Turnout		1,452	37.0	–34.0
Rejected ballots		9	0.6	
Registered electors		3,962		
Liberal Democrats hold				
Liberal Democrats gain from Conservative				

=== Tring East ===
Tring East
Party	Candidate	Votes	%	±%
Conservative	Penny Hearn*	484	47.0	–6.2
Liberal Democrats	Paul Elley	375	36.4	+0.8
Green	Joe Stopps	161	15.6	N/A
Majority		109	10.6	–7.0
Turnout		1,030	44.0	–33.4
Rejected ballots		10	1.0	
Registered electors		2,334		
Conservative hold		Swing	▼3.5	

=== Tring West & Rural ===
Tring West & Rural (2 seats)
Party	Candidate	Votes	%	±%
Liberal Democrats	Nick Hollinghurst	899	50.5	+16.3
Liberal Democrats	Christopher Townsend	824	46.3	+19.0
Conservative	Olive Conway*	528	29.6	–10.0
Conservative	Mike Hicks*	507	28.5	–8.5
Green	Roger Oliver	438	24.6	+11.9
Labour	Peter Scott	171	9.6	–0.4
Turnout		1,781	42.0	–33.4
Rejected ballots		9	0.5	
Registered electors		4,235		
Liberal Democrats gain from Conservative				
Liberal Democrats gain from Conservative				

=== Watling ===
Watling (2 seats)
Party	Candidate	Votes	%	±%
Conservative	Herbert Chapman*	726	52.0	–10.3
Conservative	Jane Timmis*	720	51.6	–4.3
Liberal Democrats	Erica Hodges	449	32.2	+22.4
Green	Emily Spry	400	28.7	N/A
Liberal Democrats	Lloyd Harris	195	14.0	+7.0
Turnout		1,395	31.0	–40.0
Rejected ballots		24	1.7	
Registered electors		4,437		
Conservative hold				
Conservative hold				

=== Woodhall Farm ===
Woodhall Farm (2 seats)
Party	Candidate	Votes	%	±%
Conservative	Rosie Sutton*	739	55.3	+0.5
Conservative	Colette Wyatt-Lowe*	707	52.9	–0.1
Labour	Jennifer Dickson	318	23.8	N/A
Labour	Paul Bryant	272	20.4	N/A
Liberal Democrats	David Egerton	230	17.2	–1.2
Liberal Democrats	Robert Short	211	15.8	+2.9
Turnout		1,335	29.0	–33.8
Rejected ballots		31	2.3	
Registered electors		4,590		
Conservative hold				
Conservative hold				

== Changes 2019–2023 ==
=== By-elections ===
==== Leverstock Green ====
The by-election was triggered by the death of Conservative councillor Graham Sutton, who had represented the ward since 2003 and served as Portfolio Holder for Planning and Infrastructure.

Leverstock Green: 6 May 2021
Party	Candidate	Votes	%	±%
Conservative	Neil Harden	1,459	60.5	+10.9
Labour	Ijlal Malik	470	19.5	−3.9
Liberal Democrats	Anna Wellings Purvis	298	12.4	−6.0
Green	Sherief Hassan	185	7.7	−10.9
Majority		989	41.0	
Turnout		2,412		
Conservative hold		Swing	▲6.8	

==== Tring Central ====
The by-election was triggered by the death of former councillor John Bowden, announced to the council on 15 July 2020.

Tring Central: 6 May 2021
Party	Candidate	Votes	%	±%
Liberal Democrats	Sheron Wilkie	925	55.3	+15.8
Conservative	Joseph Vardon-Hynard	438	26.2	−5.7
Green	Joe Stopps	172	10.3	−11.8
Labour	Jim Lawler	137	8.2	−1.1
Majority		487	29.1	
Turnout		1,672		
Liberal Democrats hold		Swing	▲7.1	

==== Boxmoor ====
The by-election was triggered by the resignation of Liberal Democrat councillor Liz Uttley, who left her role at the start of November 2021.

Boxmoor: 3 February 2022
Party	Candidate	Votes	%	±%
Liberal Democrats	Simi Dhyani	1,319	60.5	+21.2
Conservative	Brandon Geary	599	27.5	−6.5
Labour	Cameron Brady-Turner	171	7.8	−7.2
Green	Sherief Hassan	92	4.2	−8.7
Majority		720	33.0	
Turnout		2,181	32.0	−10.0
Registered electors		6,809		
Rejected ballots		5	0.2	
Liberal Democrats hold		Swing		

==== Berkhamsted West ====
The by-election was triggered by the resignation of Liberal Democrat councillor Nicky Woolner, who left her role at the start of November 2021.

Berkhamsted West: 3 February 2022
Party	Candidate	Votes	%	±%
Liberal Democrats	Anne Foster	924	64.1	+14.8
Conservative	Gary Moore	318	22.1	−8.0
Green	Kevin Fielding	130	9.0	−7.2
Labour	Peter Scott	69	4.8	−3.1
Majority		606	42.0	
Turnout		1,441	31.2	−6.8
Registered electors		4,649		
Rejected ballots		7	0.5	
Liberal Democrats hold		Swing		
