= 2003 Dacorum Borough Council election =

2003 UK local government election

- 1 May 2003

All 52 seats to Dacorum Borough Council 27 seats needed for a majority
- Turnout: 32.9%

	First party	Second party	Third party
Party	Conservative	Labour	Liberal Democrats
Seats won	32	14	6
Seat change	▲6	▼6	Steady
Popular vote	30,218	19,978	16,610
Percentage	44.4%	29.4%	24.4%
Swing	▲0.2%	▼8.3%	▲9.6%
- Winner of each seat at the 2003 Dacorum Borough Council election.
Control before election
No overall control
Control after election
Conservative

The 2003 Dacorum Borough Council election took place on 1 May 2003 to elect member to Dacorum Borough Council in Hertfordshire, England. This was on the same day as other local elections.

The whole council was up for election and the Conservatives gained overall control after previously relying on the mayor's casting vote for control. Overall turnout was 32.9%.

== Summary ==
=== Election result ===
2003 Dacorum Borough Council election
Party	Candidates	Seats	Gains	Losses	Net gain/loss	Seats %	Votes %	Votes	+/−
Conservative	52	32	8	2	▲6	61.5	44.4	30,218	+0.2
Labour	51	14	0	6	▼6	26.9	29.4	19,978	–8.3
Liberal Democrats	52	6	2	2	Steady	11.5	24.4	16,610	+9.6
Green	7	0	0	0	Steady	0.0	1.2	796	+0.4
Independent	2	0	0	0	Steady	0.0	0.5	359	–2.0
UKIP	1	0	0	0	Steady	0.0	0.1	66	N/A

== Ward results ==
Incumbent councillors standing for re-election are marked with an asterisk (*). Changes in seats do not take into account by-elections or defections.

=== Adeyfield East ===
Adeyfield East (2 seats)
Party	Candidate	Votes	%	±%
Conservative	Neil Harden	633	46.1	+2.2
Conservative	Stella Kyriazis	617	44.9	+5.7
Labour	Raymond Haverson*	499	36.3	–18.2
Labour	Michael Pesch*	491	35.8	–18.3
Liberal Democrats	Jean Blackman	226	16.5	N/A
Liberal Democrats	Christine Hardy	185	13.5	N/A
Turnout		~1,373	31.8	+0.2
Registered electors		4,317		
Conservative gain from Labour				
Conservative gain from Labour				

=== Adeyfield West ===
Adeyfield West (2 seats)
Party	Candidate	Votes	%	±%
Labour	Keith White*	574	50.9	–0.5
Labour	Elam Singam*	554	49.1	–2.2
Conservative	Keith Reid	265	23.5	–10.9
Conservative	Belinda Williams	253	22.4	–11.6
Liberal Democrats	Geoffrey Lawrence	153	13.6	N/A
Liberal Democrats	Sylvia Fry	151	13.4	N/A
Turnout		~1,128	27.4	–3.4
Registered electors		3,693		
Labour hold				
Labour hold				

=== Aldbury & Wigginton ===
Aldbury & Wigginton
Party	Candidate	Votes	%	±%
Conservative	Caroline Craufurd	327	48.8	–10.7
Liberal Democrats	Michael James	180	26.9	+5.2
Independent	Anthony MacLaughlin*	101	15.1	N/A
Labour	Sheraton Shaw	62	9.3	–9.5
Majority		147	21.9	–15.9
Turnout		670	36.1	+1.4
Registered electors		1,858		
Conservative hold		Swing	▼8.0	

=== Apsley ===
Apsley
Party	Candidate	Votes	%	±%
Conservative	Brian Ayling	423	54.9	–11.9
Labour	Frank Burgess	172	22.3	–10.9
Liberal Democrats	Ian Stanley	109	14.2	N/A
UKIP	Barry Newton	66	8.6	N/A
Majority		251	32.6	–1.0
Turnout		770	30.4	–7.4
Registered electors		2,532		
Conservative hold		Swing	▼0.5	

=== Ashridge ===
Ashridge
Party	Candidate	Votes	%	±%
Conservative	Nicholas Tiley	542	57.2	–21.1
Independent	Gerald Brooker	258	27.2	N/A
Liberal Democrats	Leslie Batchelor	82	8.6	N/A
Labour	Mark Ewing*	66	7.0	–14.7
Majority		284	30.0	–26.6
Turnout		948	44.1	–3.4
Registered electors		2,152		
Conservative hold				

=== Bennetts End ===
Bennetts End (2 seats)
Party	Candidate	Votes	%	±%
Labour	Gary Cook*	651	57.7	–6.0
Labour	Paul Eastwood*	634	56.2	–4.9
Conservative	Robert Fisher	286	25.4	–0.4
Conservative	Riaz Farooqi	242	21.5	–4.1
Liberal Democrats	Colin Roe	178	15.8	+5.4
Liberal Democrats	Stephen Wilson	162	14.4	+6.0
Turnout		~1,128	26.2	–5.1
Registered electors		4,305		
Labour hold				
Labour hold				

=== Berkhamsted Castle ===
Berkhamsted Castle (2 seats)
Party	Candidate	Votes	%	±%
Liberal Democrats	Betty Patterson	706	44.1	+12.6
Liberal Democrats	Victor Earl	702	43.8	+13.1
Conservative	Kenneth Coleman*	653	40.8	+4.6
Conservative	Peter Ginger*	628	39.2	+5.2
Green	Marion Baker	147	9.2	N/A
Labour	Ray Jones	111	6.9	–3.9
Labour	Sharon Greene	104	6.5	–4.3
Turnout		~1,601	34.4	–2.1
Registered electors		4,652		
Liberal Democrats gain from Conservative				
Liberal Democrats gain from Conservative				

=== Berkhamsted East ===
Berkhamsted East (2 seats)
Party	Candidate	Votes	%	±%
Liberal Democrats	Philip Gibbs*	642	49.0	+8.9
Liberal Democrats	John Lythgoe*	632	48.3	+9.4
Conservative	Norman Cutting	492	37.6	+5.9
Conservative	Jennifer Habib	416	31.8	+1.4
Labour	Bryan Jones	179	13.7	–4.6
Labour	Peter Norman	173	13.2	–2.0
Turnout		~1,309	32.1	–5.4
Registered electors		4,081		
Liberal Democrats hold				
Liberal Democrats hold				

=== Berkhamsted West ===
Berkhamsted West (2 seats)
Party	Candidate	Votes	%	±%
Conservative	Carol Green*	712	47.7	+7.7
Conservative	Ian Reay*	691	46.3	+6.7
Liberal Democrats	Geraldine Corry	627	42.0	–0.3
Liberal Democrats	Luc Briand	582	39.0	–1.7
Labour	Neil Shacklock	169	11.3	–2.9
Labour	Dick Dennison	154	10.3	–2.4
Turnout		~1,493	36.4	+2.1
Registered electors		4,103		
Conservative gain from Liberal Democrats				
Conservative gain from Liberal Democrats				

=== Bovingdon, Flaunden & Chipperfield ===
Bovingdon, Flaunden & Chipperfield (3 seats)
Party	Candidate	Votes	%	±%
Conservative	Susan Bradnock*	1,181	56.5	–3.8
Conservative	Richard Roberts*	1,154	55.2	–3.4
Conservative	Gbola Adeleke	1,050	50.2	–7.9
Liberal Democrats	David Griffiths	652	31.2	+9.6
Liberal Democrats	Carol Richardson	551	26.4	+7.2
Liberal Democrats	Erik Vischer	527	25.2	+9.4
Labour	Doreen Hills	249	11.9	–5.2
Labour	Martin Smith	242	11.6	–5.0
Labour	Richard Milnes	231	11.0	–4.9
Green	Martin Humphrey	157	7.5	N/A
Turnout		~2,091	33.0	–0.8
Registered electors		6,337		
Conservative hold				
Conservative hold				
Conservative hold				

=== Boxmoor ===
Boxmoor (2 seats)
Party	Candidate	Votes	%	±%
Conservative	Janice Marshall*	921	49.0	–2.3
Conservative	Andrew Fairburn*	858	45.7	–2.3
Labour	Susan White	655	34.9	–12.6
Labour	Beryl Milnes	596	31.7	–14.9
Liberal Democrats	Lucy Grayson	297	15.8	N/A
Liberal Democrats	Robert Irving	210	11.2	N/A
Green	Alan Johnson	133	7.1	N/A
Turnout		~1,878	43.5	–1.7
Registered electors		4,318		
Conservative hold				
Conservative hold				

=== Chaulden & Shrubhill ===
Chaulden & Shrubhill (2 seats)
Party	Candidate	Votes	%	±%
Labour	Anne-Lise Johnsen*	540	42.6	–14.6
Labour	Rick Widger*	527	41.6	–13.4
Conservative	Hugh Scott	443	35.0	+6.1
Conservative	Christopher Cadman	420	33.1	+4.5
Liberal Democrats	Matthew Webb	227	17.9	N/A
Liberal Democrats	Wendy Savage	226	17.8	N/A
Turnout		~1,267	32.9	–4.9
Registered electors		3,852		
Labour hold				
Labour hold				

=== Corner Hall ===
Corner Hall (2 seats)
Party	Candidate	Votes	%	±%
Conservative	Colin Peter	534	43.7	+9.9
Conservative	Michael Clark	515	42.2	+9.2
Labour	Donald Bennett*	469	38.5	–13.1
Labour	Frances Howat*	450	37.0	–9.4
Liberal Democrats	John Blackman	207	17.0	+6.8
Liberal Democrats	Margaret Waugh	180	14.7	+5.8
Turnout		~1,220	28.2	–3.4
Registered electors		4,327		
Conservative gain from Labour				
Conservative gain from Labour				

=== Gadebridge ===
Gadebridge (2 seats)
Party	Candidate	Votes	%	±%
Labour	Maureen Flint*	625	57.9	–0.1
Labour	Ron Coxage*	547	50.7	+0.3
Conservative	Roger Montgomerie	282	26.1	+5.0
Conservative	Doris Shaw	270	25.0	+4.1
Liberal Democrats	Alison Batchelor	129	11.9	N/A
Liberal Democrats	Margaret Colquhoun	121	11.2	N/A
Green	Paul Harris	89	8.2	N/A
Turnout		~1,080	27.8	–6.6
Registered electors		3,887		
Labour hold				
Labour hold				

=== Grove Hill ===
Grove Hill (3 seats)
Party	Candidate	Votes	%	±%
Labour	Anne Fisher*	681	49.4	–9.7
Labour	Michael Maloney*	628	45.6	–9.2
Labour	Richard Walsh*	613	44.5	–8.0
Conservative	Roger Andrews	506	36.7	+11.2
Conservative	Ronald Brown	474	34.4	+9.3
Conservative	Frances Ryan	472	34.2	+9.2
Liberal Democrats	Janet Dashwood	183	13.3	±0.0
Liberal Democrats	Alan Waugh	179	13.0	+1.5
Liberal Democrats	Steven Weston	165	12.0	+0.7
Turnout		~1,379	24.1	+2.1
Registered electors		5,723		
Labour hold				
Labour hold				
Labour hold				

=== Hemel Hempstead Central ===
Hemel Hempstead Central (2 seats)
Party	Candidate	Votes	%	±%
Conservative	Catherine Appleby*	530	41.0	–5.7
Conservative	Andrew Williams*	502	38.9	–7.2
Labour	Martin Rogers	444	34.4	–4.8
Labour	Bernard Gronert	443	34.3	–4.3
Liberal Democrats	David Angell	246	19.0	+8.4
Liberal Democrats	Ashley Burton	195	15.1	+5.9
Green	Hazel Johnson	99	7.7	N/A
Turnout		~1,292	34.2	+1.4
Registered electors		3,779		
Conservative hold				
Conservative hold				

=== Highfield & St. Pauls ===
Highfield & St. Pauls (3 seats)
Party	Candidate	Votes	%	±%
Labour	John Dobie*	666	44.4	–11.2
Labour	Bert Bannister	663	44.2	–8.5
Labour	El Gomez	639	42.6	–5.7
Liberal Democrats	Brenda Link	484	32.3	+4.9
Liberal Democrats	Ryan Cullen	476	31.8	+7.2
Liberal Democrats	Lesley Murray	427	28.5	+7.2
Conservative	Kevin Minier	281	18.7	–1.2
Conservative	Linda Holmes	278	18.5	–0.5
Conservative	Miriam Wiedman-Smith	253	16.9	–1.3
Turnout		~1,501	28.9	–0.1
Registered electors		5,194		
Labour hold				
Labour hold				
Labour hold				

=== Kings Langley ===
Kings Langley (2 seats)
Party	Candidate	Votes	%	±%
Conservative	Alan Anderson*	849	50.1	+5.3
Conservative	Alexander McGregor*	758	44.7	+4.0
Labour	Elizabeth Rafferty	659	38.9	+0.9
Labour	Maureen Sedlacek	538	31.7	–5.2
Liberal Democrats	Michael Morton	241	14.2	–1.0
Liberal Democrats	Gerald Coulter	217	12.8	–1.8
Turnout		~1,697	43.8	–0.4
Registered electors		3,875		
Conservative hold				
Conservative hold				

=== Leverstock Green ===
Leverstock Green (3 seats)
Party	Candidate	Votes	%	±%
Conservative	Hazel Bassadone*	1,085	59.0	+2.1
Conservative	Margaret Griffiths*	1,027	55.8	+1.1
Conservative	Graham Sutton	1,002	54.5	+1.5
Labour	Chris Twydell	461	25.1	–9.9
Labour	James Hopkins	451	24.5	–8.0
Labour	Hans Seelig	422	22.9	–8.9
Liberal Democrats	Sheila Daly	303	16.5	+9.2
Liberal Democrats	Stuart Watkin	261	14.2	+7.4
Liberal Democrats	Lynda Roe	243	13.2	+7.7
Turnout		~1,840	33.9	–8.7
Registered electors		5,427		
Conservative hold				
Conservative hold				
Conservative hold				

=== Nash Mills ===
Nash Mills
Party	Candidate	Votes	%	±%
Conservative	David Smedley*	351	45.3	–2.9
Labour	Mark Quinn	335	43.2	–0.2
Liberal Democrats	Roger Willson	89	11.5	+3.0
Majority		16	2.1	–2.7
Turnout		775	36.9	+0.7
Registered electors		2,105		
Conservative hold		Swing	▼1.4	

=== Northchurch ===
Northchurch
Party	Candidate	Votes	%	±%
Conservative	Alan Fantham	403	57.3	–10.6
Liberal Democrats	Garrick Stevens	247	35.1	+16.8
Labour	Richard Hebborn	53	7.5	–6.3
Majority		156	22.2	–27.4
Turnout		703	33.3	–4.4
Registered electors		2,122		
Conservative hold		Swing	▼13.7	

=== Tring Central ===
Tring Central (2 seats)
Party	Candidate	Votes	%	±%
Liberal Democrats	Denise Rance*	745	53.9	+10.4
Liberal Democrats	Nicholas Hollinghurst*	721	52.2	+12.6
Conservative	Penelope Hearn	532	38.5	+2.4
Conservative	Ronald Lanning	462	33.4	–1.3
Labour	Roger Oliver	119	8.6	–7.7
Labour	Barbara Gronert	104	7.5	–7.1
Turnout		~1,382	37.1	–1.4
Registered electors		3,726		
Liberal Democrats hold				
Liberal Democrats hold				

=== Tring East ===
Tring East
Party	Candidate	Votes	%	±%
Conservative	Olive Conway	418	56.3	
Liberal Democrats	Rosemarie Hollinghurst	225	30.3	
Labour	Susan Aldis	69	9.3	
Green	Colin Kruger	30	4.0	
Majority		193	26.0	
Turnout		742	35.8	
Registered electors		2,092		
Conservative hold		Swing		

=== Tring West ===
Tring West (2 seats)
Party	Candidate	Votes	%	±%
Conservative	Derek Townsend*	747	47.3	+1.3
Conservative	Stanley Mills*	716	45.4	+1.0
Liberal Democrats	Barry Batchelor	704	44.7	+14.4
Liberal Democrats	Lloyd Harris	591	37.5	+10.7
Green	Paul Sandford	141	8.9	–6.6
Labour	Daniel Carroll	139	8.8	–6.1
Turnout		~1,580	38.7	–2.3
Registered electors		4,084		
Conservative hold				
Conservative hold				

=== Warners End ===
Warners End (2 seats)
Party	Candidate	Votes	%	±%
Conservative	Janice Speaight	538	42.7	+3.9
Conservative	Robert Gillespie	535	42.5	+6.5
Labour	Margaret Coxage*	532	42.3	–9.4
Labour	Rebecca Dickenson*	472	37.5	–9.2
Liberal Democrats	Ann Fryd	162	12.9	N/A
Liberal Democrats	Martin Rance	155	12.3	N/A
Turnout		~1,262	34.3	–5.7
Registered electors		3,678		
Conservative gain from Labour				
Conservative gain from Labour				

=== Watling ===
Watling (2 seats)
Party	Candidate	Votes	%	±%
Conservative	Herbert Chapman*	873	70.7	+1.9
Conservative	Julian Taunton*	862	69.8	+1.0
Labour	Gillian Edwards	182	14.7	–10.9
Labour	Eddie Dillon	158	12.8	–8.3
Liberal Democrats	Garfield Jones	146	11.8	N/A
Liberal Democrats	Paul Elley	128	10.4	N/A
Turnout		~1,233	30.1	+0.7
Registered electors		4,095		
Conservative hold				
Conservative hold				

=== Woodhall ===
Woodhall (2 seats)
Party	Candidate	Votes	%	±%
Conservative	Stephen Holmes	522	46.4	–1.7
Conservative	Colette Wyatt-Lowe	436	38.8	–5.3
Labour	Alan Olive*	394	35.1	–8.5
Labour	Stephen Fisher	389	34.6	–7.7
Liberal Democrats	Michael Bethune	215	19.1	N/A
Liberal Democrats	David Hardingham	164	14.6	N/A
Turnout		~1,124	26.5	+3.6
Registered electors		4,242		
Conservative hold				
Conservative hold				
