= Woodhall Farm =

Area of Hemel Hempstead, Hertfordshire, England

Coordinates: 51.7526°N 0.4692°W

- Location within Hertfordshire
- OS grid reference: TL 056 071
- District: Dacorum
- Shire county: Hertfordshire
- Region: East
- Country: England
- Sovereign state: United Kingdom
- Post town: HEMEL HEMPSTEAD
- Postcode district: HP2
- Dialling code: 01442
- Police: Hertfordshire
- Fire: Hertfordshire
- Ambulance: East of England
- UK Parliament: Hemel Hempstead

Woodhall Farm is a neighbourhood on the northern side of Hemel Hempstead in the county of Hertfordshire. It was built on the former Brocks Fireworks site. Its location on the edge of Hemel Hempstead means it has open fields to its north and east with the landscaped High Wood forming an integral green barrier and recreational space.

== Development ==
Situated on the northern edge of Hemel Hempstead towards Redbourn, Woodhall Farm was built in the mid to late 1970s on the former Brock's Fireworks site with a mix of private and housing association stock. The builder was Fairview Estates and it has property ranging from 4 bedroom detached houses down to one bedroom low -rise flats. The area has a shopping centre with a Sainsbury's Supermarket, Newsagents, Fish & Chip shop and Post & Packing shop and a Chemist shop. It also has two infant and middle schools and a doctors surgery serving the local area. At the 2011 census the area was included in the Apsley and Corner Hall Ward of Dacorum Council.

Woodhall Farm is home to approximately 5,661 people, and in keeping with the new towns' (see New towns in the United Kingdom) ethos, Woodhall was built with an emphasis to provide a neighbourhood shopping complex to serve the local community.

The neighbourhood returns two councillors to Dacorum Borough Council.

There are two primary schools servicing the area; Holtsmere End JMI and Brockswood Primary School.

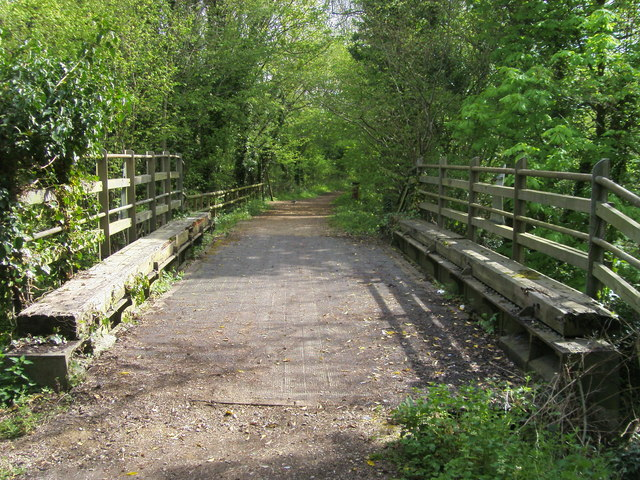
The Nickey line just south of Warners End is now used for recreation and a long distance traffic free exercise route.

The now closed Nickey Line railway is now redeveloped as a cycle path and linear green space and runs close to its southern border.

Some of the residents of Woodhall Farm were affected by the Buncefield Oil Depot explosion in 2005, causing structural and superficial damage to many of the local houses and buildings.
