= Dacorum Pavilion =

Coordinates: 51.7540°N 0.4729°W

The Dacorum Pavilion was a theatre and performance venue in Hemel Hempstead in Hertfordshire. The Pavilion closed in June 2002. The site is occupied by The Forum, which houses council offices and a library.

Acts to have performed at the Pavilion included David Bowie, Electric Light Orchestra, Eric Clapton, Elton John, Genesis, Rod Stewart and the Faces, Status Quo, Joy Division, Speedvark and U2. It was designed by the British modernist architect Clifford Culpin.

The cost of constructing the Pavilion was estimated at £341,500 in 1964.

Photographs of the pavilion by Henk Snoek are in the collection of the British Architectural Library.

The local activist group AViD (Arts Venue In Dacorum) are campaigning for the return of an arts venue in Hemel Hempstead.
