= 2023 Dacorum Borough Council election =

2023 English local election

- 4 May 2023

All 51 seats to Dacorum Borough Council 26 seats needed for a majority
- Turnout: 29.8%

	First party	Second party
Leader	Ron Tindall	Andrew Williams
Party	Liberal Democrats	Conservative
Last election	19 seats, 31.7%	31 seats, 42.8%
Seats before	19	31
Seats won	28	18
Seat change	▲9	▼13
Popular vote	33,077	27,174
Percentage	42.3%	34.8%
Swing	▲10.6%	▼8.0%
	Third party	Fourth party
Party	Labour	Independent
Last election	0 seats, 15.5%	1 seat, 0.8%
Seats before	0	1
Seats won	3	2
Seat change	▲3	▲1
Popular vote	13,943	1,061
Percentage	17.8%	1.4%
Swing	▲2.3%	▲0.6%
- Winner of each seat at the 2023 Dacorum Borough Council election
Leader before election
Andrew Williams
Conservative
Leader after election
Ron Tindall
Liberal Democrats

The 2023 Dacorum Borough Council election took place on 4 May 2023 to elect members of Dacorum Borough Council in Hertfordshire, England. This was the same day as other local elections. The election resulted in the Liberal Democrats gaining control of the council from the Conservatives

At the subsequent annual council meeting on 17 May 2023 the Liberal Democrat leader Ron Tindall was appointed leader of the council, replacing Conservative leader Andrew Williams who had held the post since 1999.

== Summary ==
=== Election result ===
2023 Dacorum Borough Council election
Party	Candidates	Seats	Gains	Losses	Net gain/loss	Seats %	Votes %	Votes	+/−
Liberal Democrats	51	28	9	0	▲9	54.9	42.0	32,870	+10.4
Conservative	50	18	0	13	▼13	35.3	34.7	27,174	–7.9
Labour	50	3	3	0	▲3	5.9	17.8	13,943	+2.3
Green	19	0	0	0	Steady	0.0	3.6	2,832	–4.4
Independent	2	2	1	0	▲1	3.9	1.4	1,061	+0.6
Reform	4	0	0	0	Steady	0.0	0.5	367	N/A

== Ward results ==
The Statement of Persons Nominated, which details the candidates standing in each ward, was released by Dacorum Borough Council following the close of nominations on 5 April 2023. The results for each ward were as follows: Incumbent councillors standing for re-election are marked with an asterisk (*).

=== Adeyfield East ===
Adeyfield East (2 seats)
Party	Candidate	Votes	%	±%
Conservative	Andrew Williams*	434	41.0	–7.9
Labour	Barbara Pesch	423	39.9	+15.3
Conservative	William Wyatt-Lowe	417	39.4	–7.4
Labour	David Taylor	400	37.8	+14.4
Liberal Democrats	Faith Thornhill	190	17.9	+9.5
Liberal Democrats	Steve Thornhill	161	15.2	+7.4
Turnout		1,059	22.1	–7.9
Registered electors		4,785		
Conservative hold				
Labour gain from Conservative				

=== Adeyfield West ===
Adeyfield West (2 seats)
Party	Candidate	Votes	%	±%
Liberal Democrats	Adrian England*	654	59.1	–2.0
Liberal Democrats	Ron Tindall*	612	55.3	–2.0
Labour	Gary Cook	220	19.9	+4.5
Conservative	Adam Wyatt-Lowe	206	18.6	–1.5
Labour	Helen Heenan	187	16.9	+2.4
Conservative	Bolane Ibrahim	186	16.8	–0.1
Turnout		1,106	22.7	–6.7
Registered electors		4,870		
Liberal Democrats hold				
Liberal Democrats hold				

=== Aldbury & Wigginton ===
Aldbury & Wigginton
Party	Candidate	Votes	%	±%
Liberal Democrats	Paul Reynolds	471	57.3	–5.8
Conservative	Paul Richardson	307	37.3	+0.4
Labour	Deborah Charlton	44	5.4	N/A
Majority		164	20.0	–6.2
Turnout		822	43.6	–0.4
Registered electors		1,886		
Liberal Democrats hold		Swing	▼3.1	

=== Apsley & Corner Hall ===
Apsley & Corner Hall (3 seats)
Party	Candidate	Votes	%	±%
Liberal Democrats	David Deacon	1,053	48.0	+23.2
Liberal Democrats	Toni Cox	990	45.1	+22.1
Liberal Democrats	Carrie Link	978	44.5	+21.9
Conservative	Brian Collier	711	32.4	–10.8
Conservative	Charlotte Palmer	647	29.5	–8.9
Conservative	Babita Sinha*	589	26.8	–10.9
Labour	Samidha Garg	404	18.4	–8.3
Labour	Daniel Worker	375	17.1	–8.4
Labour	Shanmugam Jagatharan	367	16.7	–7.2
Turnout		~2,196	29.8	+1.8
Registered electors		7,368		
Liberal Democrats gain from Conservative				
Liberal Democrats gain from Conservative				
Liberal Democrats gain from Conservative				

=== Ashridge ===
Ashridge
Party	Candidate	Votes	%	±%
Conservative	Terry Douris*	643	67.6	–1.9
Liberal Democrats	Susan Jordan	239	25.1	+1.5
Labour	Jody Whitehill	70	7.4	+0.4
Majority		404	42.5	–3.4
Turnout		951	45.5	–0.5
Registered electors		2,091		
Conservative hold		Swing	▼1.7	

=== Bennetts End ===
Bennetts End (2 seats)
Party	Candidate	Votes	%	±%
Labour	Pete Hannell	500	41.1	+8.5
Independent	John Birnie*	483	39.7	N/A
Labour	Lin Greenfield	391	32.1	–0.1
Conservative	Mark Rogers*	359	29.5	–6.6
Conservative	Muhammad Khan	313	25.7	–9.8
Green	Andy Lambert	166	13.6	–2.4
Liberal Democrats	Philip Lovell	129	10.6	–6.1
Liberal Democrats	Lynda Roe	124	10.2	–2.7
Turnout		~1,217	26.9	–6.1
Registered electors		4,523		
Labour gain from Conservative				
Independent gain from Conservative				

=== Berkhamsted Castle ===
Berkhamsted Castle (2 seats)
Party	Candidate	Votes	%	±%
Liberal Democrats	Ian Bristow	1,287	75.8	+23.8
Liberal Democrats	Rick Freedman*	1,205	71.0	+22.6
Conservative	Sue Beardshaw	477	28.1	–2.7
Conservative	Anthony Armytage	460	27.1	–2.4
Green	Leslie Tate	189	11.1	–8.1
Labour	Kae Meeks	155	9.1	+1.8
Labour	Kevin Dunford	112	6.6	+2.3
Reform	Lesley Taylor	57	3.4	N/A
Turnout		~1,698	37.5	–7.5
Registered electors		4,527		
Liberal Democrats hold				
Liberal Democrats hold				

=== Berkhamsted East ===
Berkhamsted East (2 seats)
Party	Candidate	Votes	%	±%
Liberal Democrats	Garrick Stevens*	1,300	77.3	+17.7
Liberal Democrats	Nigel Taylor*	1,065	63.3	+20.2
Conservative	Ian Reay	415	24.7	–2.2
Green	Kevin Fielding	298	17.7	–6.8
Conservative	Rene De Silva	290	17.2	–3.5
Labour	Michael Bromberg	218	13.0	+0.9
Labour	Jay Gladdy	161	9.6	N/A
Turnout		~1,682	36.0	–5.0
Registered electors		4,673		
Liberal Democrats hold				
Liberal Democrats hold				

=== Berkhamsted West ===
Berkhamsted West (2 seats)
Party	Candidate	Votes	%	±%
Liberal Democrats	Sally Symington*	1,155	80.1	+26.5
Liberal Democrats	Robert Stewart	987	68.4	+20.0
Conservative	Carol Green	451	31.3	+1.7
Labour	Rebecca Mackenzie	192	13.3	+5.5
Green	Bernard Hurley	179	12.4	–3.5
Labour	Christopher Roberts	112	7.8	+1.1
Turnout		~1,442	31.1	–6.9
Registered electors		4,636		
Liberal Democrats hold				
Liberal Democrats hold				

=== Bovingdon, Flaunden & Chipperfield ===
Bovingdon, Flaunden & Chipperfield (3 seats)
Party	Candidate	Votes	%	±%
Conservative	Stewart Riddick*	1,116	57.7	–3.4
Conservative	Gbola Adeleke*	1,070	55.3	–0.4
Conservative	Philip Walker	1,026	53.1	+3.0
Liberal Democrats	Sarah Bell	630	32.6	+11.9
Green	Wiebke Carr	493	25.5	–5.8
Liberal Democrats	Adam Hawkswood	462	23.9	+4.5
Labour	Michael Buttleman	420	21.7	+10.6
Liberal Democrats	Nick Hollinghurst*	400	20.7	+3.7
Labour	Antony Fitzgerald	331	17.1	N/A
Labour	James Wignall	291	15.1	N/A
Turnout		~1,933	28.8	–4.2
Registered electors		6,711		
Conservative hold				
Conservative hold				
Conservative hold				

=== Boxmoor ===
Boxmoor (3 seats)
Party	Candidate	Votes	%	±%
Liberal Democrats	William Allen*	1,668	77.2	+32.4
Liberal Democrats	Claire Hobson*	1,563	72.4	+29.5
Liberal Democrats	Simy Dhyani*	1,451	67.2	+28.3
Conservative	Peter Allen	620	28.7	–5.0
Conservative	Grace Froggatt	551	25.5	–5.8
Conservative	Carole Levene	498	23.1	–6.4
Labour	Andrew Suzmeyan	273	12.6	–2.3
Labour	Lee Whitehill	262	12.1	+0.7
Labour	Helen Terry	252	11.7	+2.6
Turnout		~2,160	31.4	–9.6
Registered electors		6,879		
Liberal Democrats hold				
Liberal Democrats hold				
Liberal Democrats hold				

=== Chaulden & Warners End ===
Chaulden & Warners End (3 seats)
Party	Candidate	Votes	%	±%
Conservative	Fiona Guest*	923	51.8	+0.1
Conservative	Graeme Elliot*	835	46.8	–0.7
Conservative	Nigel Durrant*	828	46.4	–0.6
Labour	Kit Wales	602	33.8	+10.9
Labour	Anne Harradine	594	33.3	+12.5
Liberal Democrats	Diane Wilson	527	29.6	+11.7
Liberal Democrats	Allison McKenzie	516	28.9	+16.5
Liberal Democrats	Neil Kennedy	387	21.7	+9.5
Reform	Michael Potts	158	8.9	N/A
Turnout		~1,783	26.7	–7.3
Registered electors		6,679		
Conservative hold				
Conservative hold				
Conservative hold				

=== Gadebridge ===
Gadebridge (2 seats)
Party	Candidate	Votes	%	±%
Labour	Angela Mitchell	451	43.5	+17.9
Conservative	Heather Pound	421	40.6	–2.0
Conservative	Mark Bignell	405	39.1	–1.8
Labour	Gary Ruff	370	35.7	+12.0
Green	Christine Ridley	163	15.7	–1.8
Liberal Democrats	Sarah Owen	141	13.6	–2.8
Liberal Democrats	Christopher Angell	132	12.7	–3.2
Green	Suzanne Watts	125	12.1	–1.8
Turnout		~1,036	25.9	–1.1
Registered electors		3,996		
Labour gain from Conservative				
Conservative hold				

=== Grovehill ===
Grovehill (3 seats)
Party	Candidate	Votes	%	±%
Conservative	Julie Banks*	708	55.1	+4.0
Conservative	Alex Bhinder*	689	53.6	+2.8
Conservative	Goverdhan Silwal*	606	47.2	+3.7
Labour	Jennifer Dickson	498	38.8	+18.8
Labour	Stephen Fisher	446	34.7	+15.2
Labour	Pat Dartnell	413	32.1	+16.3
Liberal Democrats	Emma Macey	246	19.1	+9.9
Liberal Democrats	Nicholas Keay	175	13.6	+5.1
Liberal Democrats	Robert Short	148	11.5	+3.1
Reform	Noel Willcox	91	7.1	N/A
Turnout		~1,285	23.0	–6.0
Registered electors		5,586		
Conservative hold				
Conservative hold				
Conservative hold				

=== Hemel Hempstead Town ===
Hemel Hempstead Town (2 seats)
Party	Candidate	Votes	%	±%
Liberal Democrats	Sadie Hobson	621	52.1	+25.5
Liberal Democrats	Victoria Santamaria	555	46.5	+22.9
Labour	Malik Ijlal	358	30.0	+3.1
Conservative	Rob Beauchamp*	351	29.4	+1.3
Labour	Janet Ventiroso	337	28.3	+4.0
Conservative	Mike Pound	307	25.7	–1.8
Turnout		~1,193	23.4	–4.6
Registered electors		5,097		
Liberal Democrats gain from Conservative				
Liberal Democrats gain from Conservative				

=== Highfield ===
Highfield (2 seats)
Party	Candidate	Votes	%	±%
Liberal Democrats	Brenda Link*	464	56.0	+14.1
Liberal Democrats	Sammy Barry-Mears*	450	54.3	+15.2
Labour	Vanessa Mitchell	228	27.5	+1.4
Conservative	Chris Griffiths	213	25.7	+7.9
Labour	Raymond York	207	25.0	+0.8
Conservative	Bindu Gupta	168	20.3	+5.9
Turnout		~827	20.5	–9.5
Registered electors		4,035		
Liberal Democrats hold				
Liberal Democrats hold				

=== Kings Langley ===
Kings Langley (2 seats)
Party	Candidate	Votes	%	±%
Conservative	Alan Johnson*	673	59.2	+6.7
Conservative	Alan Anderson*	646	56.8	+4.8
Green	Ashley Lawrence	308	27.1	–0.7
Labour	Julia Coleman	270	23.7	+13.8
Liberal Democrats	Frances Parkins	201	17.7	–2.4
Labour	Dominic Hook	185	16.3	+7.1
Liberal Democrats	Holli Pandit	184	16.2	+4.5
Turnout		~1,137	28.1	–6.9
Registered electors		4,045		
Conservative hold				
Conservative hold				

=== Leverstock Green ===
Leverstock Green (3 seats)
Party	Candidate	Votes	%	±%
Liberal Democrats	Robin Bromham	1,098	50.7	+32.6
Liberal Democrats	Jonathan Gale	1,060	48.9	+34.0
Liberal Democrats	Catherine McArevey	966	44.6	+33.7
Conservative	Margaret Griffiths*	937	43.3	–11.2
Conservative	Rosie Sutton*	928	42.8	–8.2
Conservative	Neil Harden*	883	40.8	–8.3
Labour	Stephen Alexander	349	16.1	–7.1
Labour	Ian Laidlaw-Dickson	320	14.8	–4.8
Labour	Mandi Tattershall	305	14.1	–2.8
Green	Paul De Hoest	158	7.3	–11.1
Turnout		~2,161	30.8	–0.2
Registered electors		7,014		
Liberal Democrats gain from Conservative				
Liberal Democrats gain from Conservative				
Liberal Democrats gain from Conservative				

=== Nash Mills ===
Nash Mills
Party	Candidate	Votes	%	±%
Independent	Jan Maddern*	578	65.7	+1.7
Conservative	Sanjay Jamuar	149	16.9	+0.3
Labour	Jane Gibbons	107	12.2	+3.0
Liberal Democrats	Alexander Bell	46	5.2	–4.9
Majority		429	48.8	+1.4
Turnout		880	28.4	–5.6
Registered electors		2,704		
Independent hold		Swing	▲0.7	

=== Northchurch ===
Northchurch
Party	Candidate	Votes	%	±%
Liberal Democrats	Lara Pringle*	707	70.2	+4.3
Conservative	Jackie Jones	214	21.3	–2.0
Green	Rose Sheridan	47	4.7	–1.8
Labour	Steve Ritchie	39	3.9	–0.4
Majority		493	48.9	+6.3
Turnout		1,007	43.1	+1.1
Registered electors		2,336		
Liberal Democrats hold		Swing	▲3.2	

=== Tring Central ===
Tring Central (2 seats)
Party	Candidate	Votes	%	±%
Liberal Democrats	Sheron Wilkie*	902	69.1	+18.9
Liberal Democrats	Carole Weston	780	59.7	+20.5
Conservative	Keith Baker	317	24.3	–7.4
Conservative	Phil Hills	305	23.4	–0.7
Labour	Jim Lawler	153	11.7	+2.4
Green	Roger Oliver	140	10.7	–11.3
Green	Mark Rutherford	130	10.0	N/A
Labour	Jacob Ellett	115	8.8	N/A
Turnout		~1,306	33.8	–3.2
Registered electors		3,864		
Liberal Democrats hold				
Liberal Democrats hold				

=== Tring East ===
Tring East
Party	Candidate	Votes	%	±%
Liberal Democrats	Michela Capozzi	580	51.0	+14.2
Conservative	Penny Hearn*	435	38.2	–9.3
Labour	Jack Curham	63	5.5	N/A
Green	William Burgar	60	5.3	–10.5
Majority		145	12.8	N/A
Turnout		1,139	49.5	+5.5
Registered electors		2,300		
Liberal Democrats gain from Conservative		Swing	▲11.8	

=== Tring West & Rural ===
Tring West & Rural (2 seats)
Party	Candidate	Votes	%	±%
Liberal Democrats	Brian Patterson	1,035	63.4	+13.0
Liberal Democrats	John Mottershead	844	51.7	+5.4
Conservative	Mike Hicks	501	30.7	+1.1
Conservative	Justin Charlton-Jones	462	28.3	–0.2
Green	Joe Stopps	376	23.0	–1.5
Labour	Colin Phillips	164	10.0	+0.5
Labour	Mark Rutherford	153	9.4	N/A
Turnout		~1,631	36.3	–5.7
Registered electors		4,491		
Liberal Democrats hold				
Liberal Democrats hold				

=== Watling ===
Watling (2 seats)
Party	Candidate	Votes	%	±%
Conservative	Jane Timmis*	686	54.9	+2.8
Conservative	Edward Barradell	608	48.7	–3.0
Liberal Democrats	Timothy Symington	489	39.1	+6.9
Liberal Democrats	Lloyd Harris	478	38.2	+24.2
Labour	Emma Reed	253	20.2	N/A
Labour	Alan Olive	216	17.3	N/A
Turnout		~1,251	28.7	–2.3
Registered electors		4,356		
Conservative hold				
Conservative hold				

=== Woodhall Farm ===
Woodhall Farm (2 seats)
Party	Candidate	Votes	%	±%
Conservative	Colette Wyatt-Lowe*	614	57.8	+2.5
Conservative	Belinda Williams	576	54.2	+1.3
Labour	Alan Dickson	299	28.1	+4.3
Labour	Amanda Pollard	288	27.1	+6.7
Liberal Democrats	David Egerton	201	18.9	+1.7
Liberal Democrats	Deborah Curtis-England	163	15.3	–0.5
Reform	Saba Poursaeedi	61	5.7	N/A
Turnout		~1,063	23.1	–5.9
Registered electors		4,602		
Conservative hold				
Conservative hold				

== Changes 2023–2027 ==
=== Affiliation changes ===
- Goverdhan Silwal, elected as a Conservative, left the party to sit as an independent in March 2024, before joining Labour in June 2024.
- Bennetts End councillor John Birnie died on 24 August 2024, thus leaving the seat vacant.
- On 25 September 2024, Claire Hobson announced that she and seven other female councillors: Sammy Barry-Mears, Michela Capozzi, Toni Cox, Lara Pringle, Victoria Santamaria, Carole Weston, and Sheron Wilkie, would be resigning from the local Liberal Democrat group after accusing council leader Adrian England and former council leader Ron Tindall of "failing to deal with allegations of bullying and harassment, including sexual harassment." The Liberal Democrats subsequently lost their majority on the council.

=== By-elections ===
==== Tring West & Rural ====
The by-election was triggered by the resignation of Liberal Democrat councillor John Mottershead, who stood down due to ill health.

Tring West and Rural by-election, 15 February 2024
Party	Candidate	Votes	%	±%
Liberal Democrats	Caroline Smith-Wright	899	62.7	+12.9
Conservative	Mike Hicks	303	21.1	−3.0
Green	Joe Stopps	122	8.5	−9.6
Labour	Jim Lawler	109	7.6	−0.3
Majority		596	41.6	+15.9
Turnout		1,433	27.2	
Registered electors		5,291		
Rejected ballots		5	0.3	
Liberal Democrats hold		Swing	▲7.9	

==== Bennetts End ====
The by-election was triggered by the death of Conservative councillor John Birnie on 24 August 2024.

Bennetts End by-election: 21 November 2024
Party	Candidate	Votes	%	±%
Labour	Lin Greenfield	318	37.1	+6.6
Conservative	Margaret Griffiths	313	36.5	+14.6
Green	Andrew Lambert	102	11.9	+1.8
Reform	Christopher Morris	92	10.7	N/A
Liberal Democrats	Lloyd Harris	32	3.7	–4.2
Majority		5	0.6	N/A
Turnout		858	18.6	–8.3
Registered electors		4,614		
Rejected ballots		1	0.1	
Labour gain from Independent		Swing	▼4.0	

==== Hemel Hempstead Town ====
The by-election was triggered by the resignation of Liberal Democrat councillor Sadie Hobson in September 2024, who had been first elected in May 2023.

Hemel Hempstead Town by-election: 21 November 2024
Party	Candidate	Votes	%	±%
Conservative	Neil Harden	347	43.7	+17.3
Liberal Democrats	Aatish Pattni	174	21.9	–24.8
Labour	Mohamed Fawzi	147	18.5	–8.4
Reform	Silvi Sutherland	79	9.9	N/A
Green	Christine Talbot	47	5.9	N/A
Majority		173	21.8	N/A
Turnout		795	15.0	–8.4
Registered electors		5,301		
Rejected ballots		1	0.1	
Conservative gain from Liberal Democrats		Swing	▲21.1	

==== Berkhamsted West ====
The by-election was triggered by the death of Liberal Democrat councillor Robert Stewart.

Berkhamsted West by-election: 24 July 2025
Party	Candidate	Votes	%	±%
Liberal Democrats	Will Jankowski	643	56.4	–2.0
Conservative	Ben Rolfe	357	31.3	+8.5
Green	Rose Sheridan	99	8.7	–0.4
Labour	Jim Lawler	41	3.6	–6.1
Majority		286	25.1	N/A
Turnout		1,156	24.5	–6.6
Registered electors		4,725		
Rejected ballots		13	1.1	
Liberal Democrats hold		Swing	▼5.3	

==== Apsley & Corner Hall ====
The by-election was triggered by the resignation of councillor Toni Cox, who had left the Liberal Democrat group in 2024 to sit as an independent and formally resigned her seat in April 2026.

Apsley & Corner Hall by-election, 11 June 2026
Party	Candidate	Votes	%	±%
Liberal Democrats	Hugo James Hardy	742	32.9	–15.1
Reform	Andrew Garnett	552	24.5	+24.5
Conservative	Hubert Harvey Wilson	404	17.9	–14.5
Independent	Eric Johnson	213	9.4	+9.4
Green	Connor Manship	181	8.0	+8.0
Labour	Bailey Hewitt	161	7.1	–11.3
Majority		190	8.4	N/A
Turnout		2,255	30.8	+1.0
Registered electors		7,326		
Rejected ballots		1	0.0	
Liberal Democrats hold				

==== Tring Central ====
Tring Central by-election: 10 December 2026
Party	Candidate	Votes	%	±%
Conservative	Julia Raven			
Reform	Jeanette Rowley			
Green	Rose Sheridan			
Liberal Democrats	Christopher Townsend			
Majority				
Turnout				
		Swing		
