= Old Town Hall, Hemel Hempstead =

Municipal building in Hemel Hempstead, Hertfordshire, England

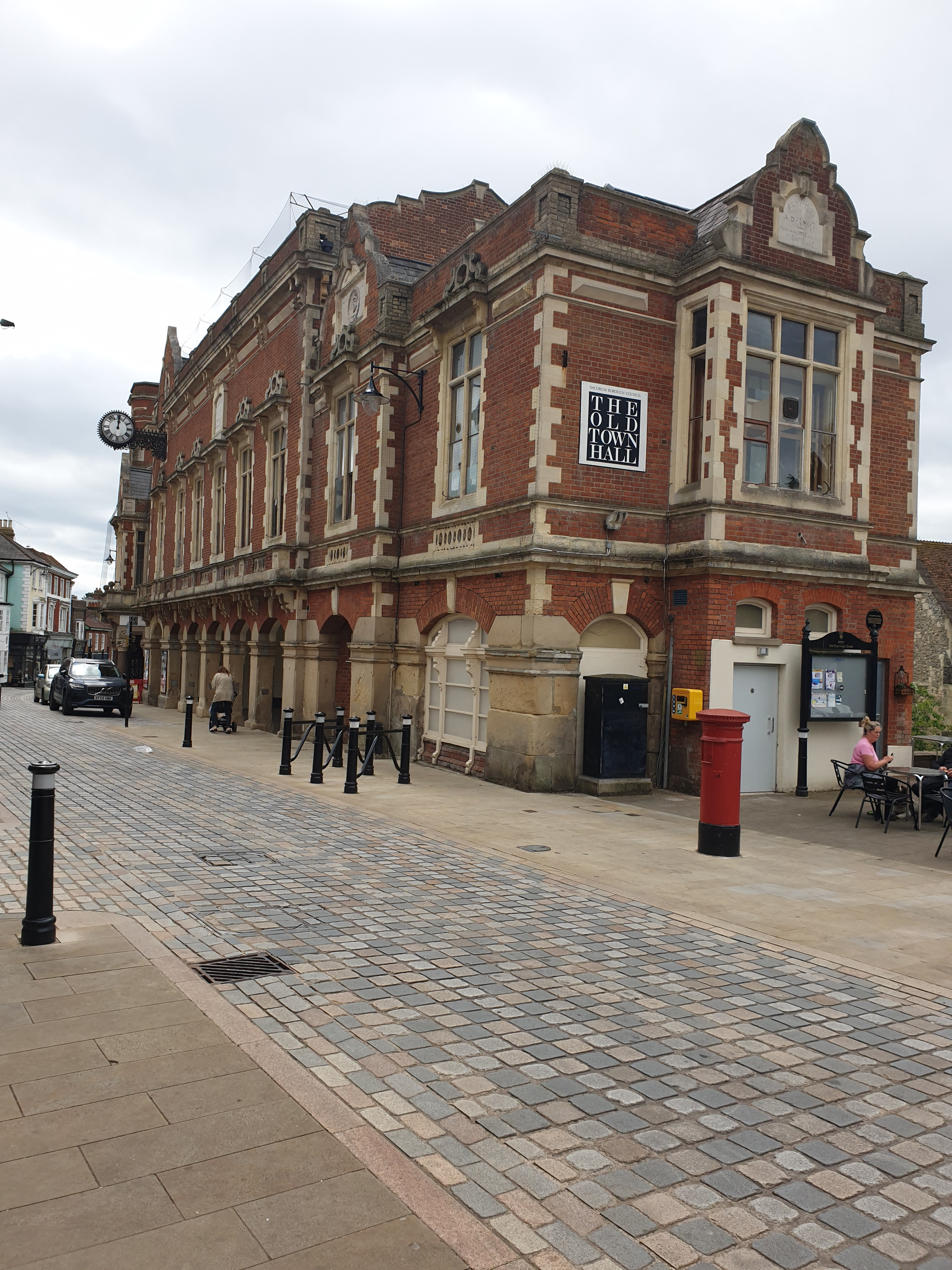
- Old Town Hall, Hemel Hempstead

- Shown in Hertfordshire
- 51.7591°N 0.4721°W
- Location: High Street, Hemel Hempstead

History
- Built: 1851

Site notes
- Architect: George Low
- Architectural style: Jacobean style

Listed Building – Grade II
- Official name: Town Hall
- Designated: 17 February 1977
- Reference no.: 1342196

The Old Town Hall is a municipal building in the High Street, Hemel Hempstead, Hertfordshire, England. The town hall, which was the meeting place of Hemel Hempstead Borough Council, is a Grade II listed building.

== History ==
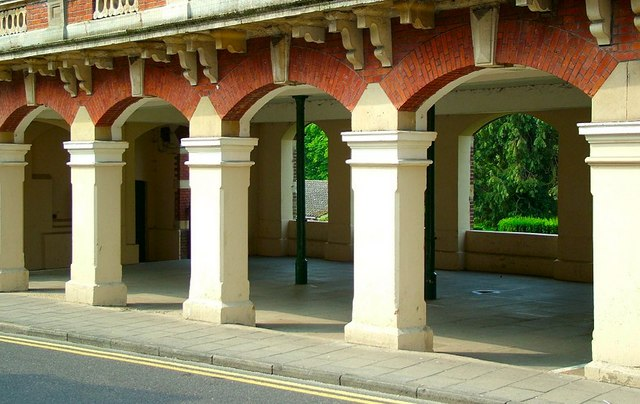
Detail of the arcading on the ground floor of the corn exchange

A market place was established in the old town under a charter awarded by Henry VIII in 1539. By the early 19th century the market hall took the form of a long range of corn lofts, which stood on pillars, so that markets could be held underneath. A courtroom was established at the north end and a town hall was erected at the centre of the structure in 1825.

After the market hall became dilapidated, civic leaders decided to demolish the old building in sections: the central and north sections of the old structure were demolished in 1851. The new building (the central section of the current structure) was designed by George Low in the Jacobean style, built with red brick and stone dressings and completed later that year. The design involved a symmetrical main frontage with five bays facing onto the High Street; the middle bay featured a portico with Corinthian order columns supporting a balcony and a bay window on the first floor with a gable above.

The new building was extended to the north along the High Street, with arcading on the ground floor, to create a corn exchange in 1861. The remaining (southern) section of the old structure was demolished and the new building was extended to the south along the High Street, with a four-stage tower which included an octagonal upper stage, to create municipal offices in 1868.

Following the acquisition of part of the St Mary's Churchyard, the market place was extended in 1888. This was recorded by a stone plaque on the front of the building, which stated "Bailiwick of Hemel Hempstead: this market place was formed and these buildings erected by the Bailiff and the Town Improvement Committee AD 1888."

After population growth, in part associated with the opening of Boxmoor Railway Station on the London and Birmingham Railway in 1837 and of Hemel Hempsted railway station on the Nickey line in 1877, the area became a municipal borough, with the town hall as its headquarters, in 1898. The town hall continued to serve as the headquarters of the local municipal borough council for much of the 20th century but ceased to be the local seat of government after a new civic centre, designed by Clifford Culpin and Partners, was completed in 1966. (Note: The civic centre subsequently became the home of Dacorum Borough Council when it was formed in 1974.) Instead the town hall was used for theatre performances from 1978 and was refurbished for use as an arts centre in 1986.
