= Dacorum =

Local government district in England

Coordinates: 51°46′N 00°32′W

Dacorum Borough of Dacorum
- Borough & Non-metropolitan district
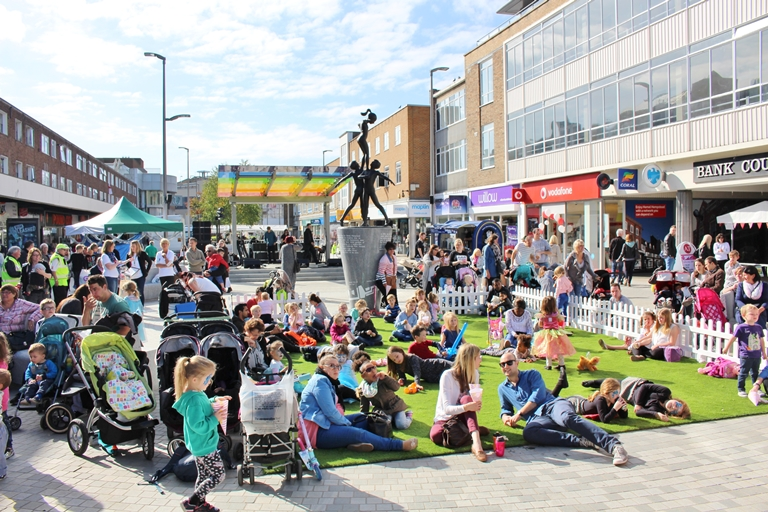
- Hemel Hempstead town centre

- Coat of arms

- Dacorum shown within Hertfordshire
- Sovereign state: United Kingdom
- Constituent country: England
- Region: East of England
- Administrative county: Hertfordshire
- Founded: 1 April 1974
- Admin. HQ: Hemel Hempstead

Government
  - Type: Non-metropolitan district
  - Body: Dacorum Borough Council
  - Leadership: Leader & Cabinet
  - MPs: David Taylor (L); Victoria Collins (LD); Gagan Mohindra (C)

Area
  - Total: 82 sq mi (212 km^{2})
  - Rank: 141st

Population (2025)
  - Total: 162,316
  - Rank: Ranked 136th
  - Density: 1,980/sq mi (766/km^{2})

Ethnicity (2021)
  - Ethnic groups: List: 86.8% White; 5.8% Asian; 3.4% Mixed; 2.8% Black; 1.2% other

Religion (2021)
  - Religion: List: 46.4% Christianity; 41.1% no religion; 9.4% other; 3.1% Islam
- Time zone: UTC+0 (Greenwich Mean Time)
  - Summer (DST): UTC+1 (British Summer Time)
- Postcode: HP
- ONS code: 26UC (ONS); E07000096 (GSS)

Dacorum is a local government district with borough status in Hertfordshire, England. The council is based in Hemel Hempstead. The borough also includes the towns of Berkhamsted and Tring and surrounding villages. The borough had a population of 155,081 in 2021. Dacorum was created in 1974 and is named after the medieval "hundred" (a type of county division) of Dacorum, which had covered a similar area. The borough of Dacorum is the westernmost of Hertfordshire's ten districts. It borders St Albans, Three Rivers, Buckinghamshire and Central Bedfordshire.

== History ==
Dacorum was one of the hundreds of Hertfordshire. In the Domesday Book of 1086 the area was recorded as two separate hundreds: Danais (meaning "of the Danes") and Tring. The name Danais relates to a period in Saxon times when the area formed part of the Danelaw, which covered much of what is now eastern England, although the duration and extent of Danish presence in Hertfordshire remain uncertain and continue to be debated by historians.

By about 1200 the two hundreds had merged into a single hundred, which from 1196 onward was increasingly recorded in Latin as Dacorum ("of the Dacians"). After the mid-13th century, Dacorum completely replaced the older names. The substitution of Danais with Dacorum reflects a broader medieval usage in which the Latin name Dacia, originally denoting an ancient territory of south-east Europe centred on modern Romania, came to be applied to Denmark and later to Scandinavia as a whole. This geographical confusion was influenced by Jordanes' account that the Goths, who had settled in Dacia in south-east Europe during the Migration Period, had originally come from Scandinavia.

From the seventeenth century onwards, hundreds gradually declined in importance as administrative divisions, with their functions passing to other bodies such as the county courts. The final administrative functions of hundreds were extinguished in 1886.

The modern local government district of Dacorum was created on 1 April 1974 under the Local Government Act 1972, covering the whole area of five former districts and parts of another two, which were all abolished at the same time:

- Berkhamsted Rural District
- Berkhamsted Urban District
- Hemel Hempstead Municipal Borough
- Hemel Hempstead Rural District
- St Albans Rural District (part within designated area of Hemel Hempstead New Town only)
- Tring Urban District
- Watford Rural District (part within designated area of Hemel Hempstead New Town only)

The new district was named Dacorum after the medieval hundred, which had covered a similar area.

The district was granted borough status in 1984, allowing the chair of the council to take the title of mayor. Hemel Hempstead had maintained charter trustees from 1974 to 1984. The amalgamation of the former local authorities was symbolised in the seven oak leaves which surround a Tudor rose on the Dacorum coat of arms, issued in 1992.

Under current local government reorganisation plans, all district councils in Hertfordshire, as well as the county council, will be abolished in 2028, with the district becoming part of a new West Hertfordshire unitary authority.

== Governance ==
Dacorum Borough Council

Type
- Type: Non-metropolitan district council

Leadership
- Mayor: Garrick Stevens, Liberal Democrats since 13 May 2026
- Leader: Sally Symington, Liberal Democrats since 2 April 2025
- Chief Executive (interim): Darren Welsh since March 2025

Structure
- Seats: 51 Councillors
- Political groups: Administration (19) Liberal Democrats (19) Other parties (32) Independent (10) Labour (4) Conservative (18)

Elections
- Voting system: Plurality voting system
- Last election: 4 May 2023
- Next election: 6 May 2027

Meeting place
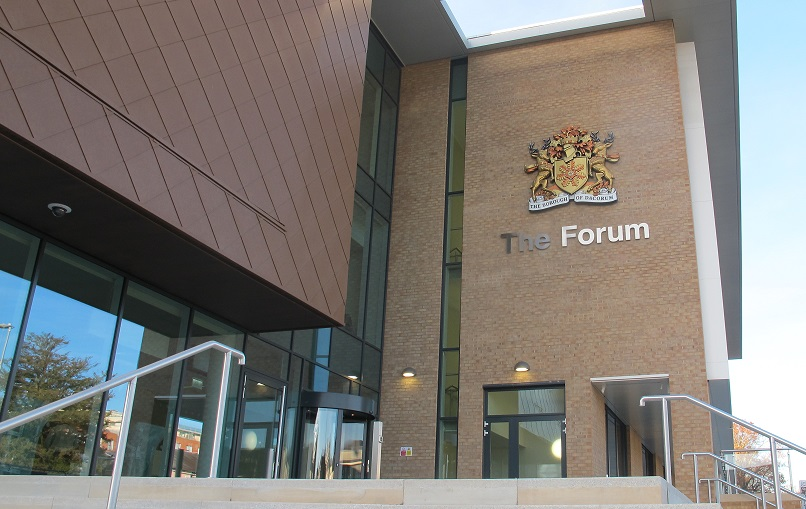
- The Forum, Marlowes, Hemel Hempstead, HP1 1DN

Website
- www.dacorum.gov.uk

Hertfordshire has a two-tier structure of local government, with the ten district councils (including Dacorum Borough Council) providing district-level services, and Hertfordshire County Council providing county-level services. Most of Dacorum is also covered by civil parishes, which form a third tier of local government in their areas.

=== Political control ===
The Liberal Democrats won a majority of the seats on the council at the 2023 election. Following changes of allegiance, the party lost its majority in September 2024. Since then, the party has formed a minority administration. Prior to 2023 the Conservatives had held a majority of the seats since 2003.

The first election to the council was held in 1973, initially operating as a shadow authority alongside the outgoing authorities until the new arrangements came into effect on 1 April 1974. Political control of the council since 1974 has been as follows:

Party in control	Years
Labour	1974–1976
Conservative	1976–1995
Labour	1995–1999
No overall control	1999–2003
Conservative	2003–2023
Liberal Democrats	2023–2024
No overall control	2024–present

=== Leadership ===
The role of mayor is largely ceremonial in Dacorum. Political leadership is instead provided by the leader of the council. The leaders since 1991 have been:

Councillor	Party	From	To
Julian Taunton	Conservative	1991	1995
Julia Coleman	Labour	1995	1999
Andrew Williams	Conservative	1999	May 2023
Ron Tindall	Liberal Democrats	17 May 2023	15 May 2024
Adrian England	Liberal Democrats	15 May 2024	Feb 2025
Sally Symington	Liberal Democrats	2 Apr 2025	

=== Composition ===
Following the 2023 election and subsequent by-elections and changes of allegiance up to July 2026, the composition of the council was:

Party	Seats
Liberal Democrats	19
Independent	10
Labour	4
Conservative	18
Total	51

The next elections are scheduled for 2027, but may be affected by the upcoming structural changes to local government in England.

=== Premises ===
The council is based at The Forum on Marlowes in Hemel Hempstead. From the council's creation in 1974 until 2017, the council was based at Dacorum Civic Centre, also on Marlowes in Hemel Hempstead. That building had previously been called Hemel Hempstead Town Hall, having been built for Hemel Hempstead Borough Council in 1966 to replace the Old Town Hall on High Street. On 16 January 2017 the council opened its new headquarters at The Forum, on the corner of Marlowes and Combe Street, immediately south of the Civic Centre, which was demolished shortly afterwards.

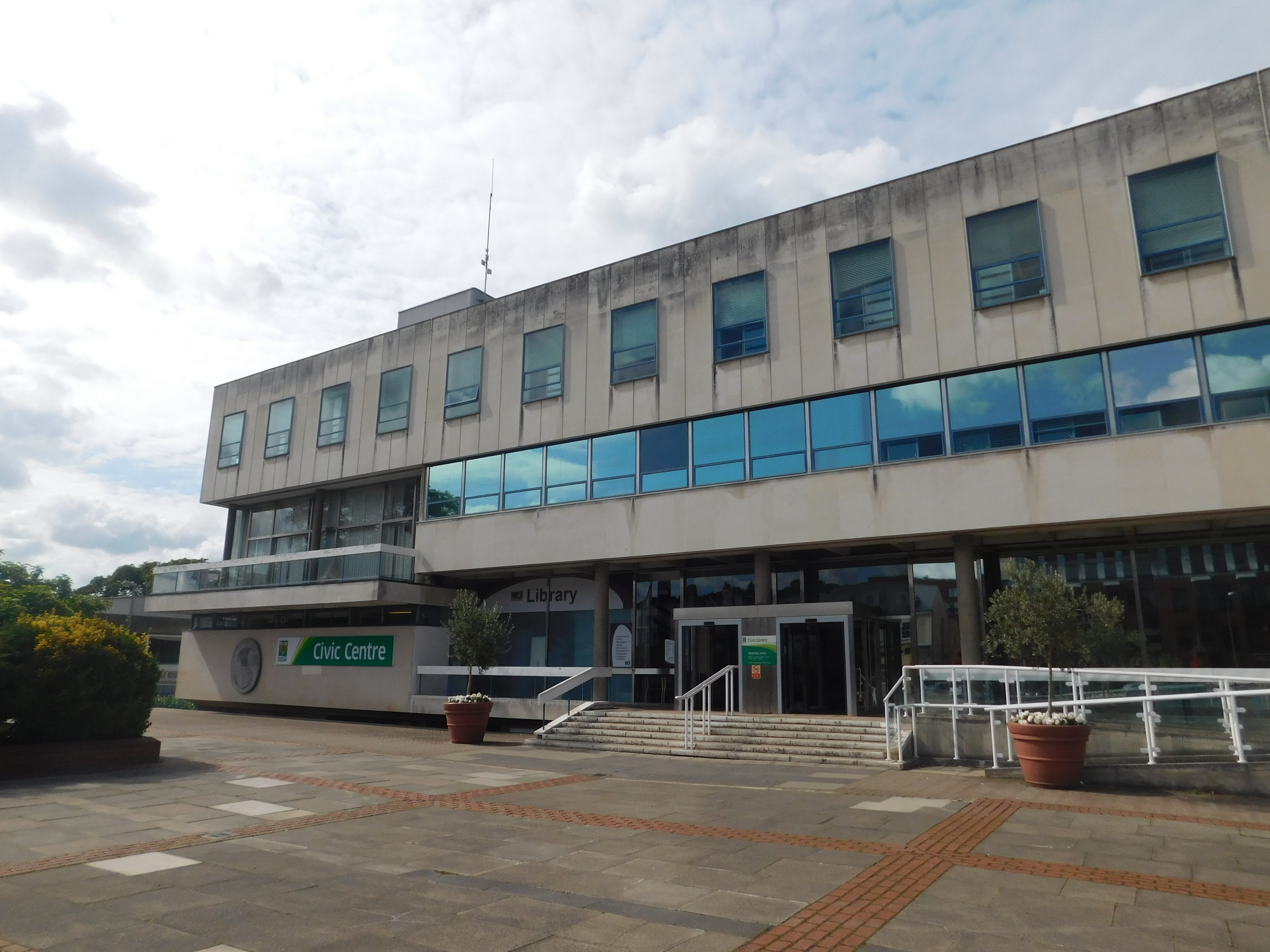
Civic Centre, Marlowes, Hemel Hempstead: Council's headquarters 1974–2017, since demolished

== Elections ==
Since the last boundary changes in 2007 the council has comprised 51 councillors, representing 25 wards, with each ward electing one, two or three councillors. The whole council is elected together every four years.

=== Wards ===
The borough's wards are:

- Adeyfield East
- Adeyfield West
- Aldbury and Wigginton
- Apsley and Corner Hall
- Ashridge
- Bennetts End
- Berkhamsted Castle
- Berkhamsted East
- Berkhamsted West
- Bovingdon, Flaunden and Chipperfield
- Boxmoor
- Chaulden and Warners End
- Gadebridge
- Grovehill
- Hemel Hempstead Town
- Highfield
- Kings Langley
- Leverstock Green
- Nash Mills
- Northchurch
- Tring Central
- Tring East
- Tring West and Rural
- Watling
- Woodhall Farm

== Parishes ==
Hemel Hempstead is an unparished area. The rest of the borough is divided into 16 civil parishes, with Berkhamsted and Tring parish councils taking the style "town council". The civil parishes are:

- Aldbury
- Berkhamsted
- Bovingdon
- Chipperfield
- Flamstead
- Flaunden
- Great Gaddesden
- Kings Langley
- Little Gaddesden
- Markyate
- Nash Mills
- Nettleden with Potten End
- Northchurch
- Tring
- Tring Rural
- Wigginton

== Arms ==
Coat of arms of Dacorum
Notes Granted 21 January 1992. Crest A sprig of seven oak leaves Proper and acorns Or inflected to the sinister out of a mural crown Or. Escutcheon Or seven oak leaves stalks inward Vert radiating from a Tudor rose Proper. Supporters Two stags in trian aspect Proper attired and unguled Or gorged with a wreath Or and Gules ribbons flowing outward depending therefrom a bezant charged with oak leaves and a Tudor rose as in the Arms standing on a compartment Vert strewn with sprigs of oak leaves Proper and acorns Or.

== Media ==
In terms of television, Dacorum is served by BBC London and ITV London with television signals received from the Crystal Palace transmitter and the Hemel Hempstead relay transmitter. However, Tring receives regional overlaps of both Sandy Heath (BBC East/ITV Anglia) and Oxford (BBC South/ITV Meridian) transmitters.

Radio stations for the area are:

- BBC Three Counties Radio
- Heart Hertfordshire
- Greatest Hits Radio Bucks, Beds and Herts (covering Tring)
- Mix 92.6
- Community-based radio stations: Radio Dacorum and Tring Radio

Local newspapers are Hemel Hempstead Gazette and St Albans Observer.

== Town twinning ==
- The Borough of Dacorum is twinned with:
  - Neu-Isenburg, Germany

Two of the civil parishes in the borough also maintain their own separate twinning arrangements:

- Berkhamsted Town Council is twinned with:
  - Beaune (France)
- Kings Langley Parish Council with:
  - (The Gambia) Bakau (Gambia).

== Proposed Abolition ==
local government restructuring in Hertfordshire

Map of Dacorum among Hertfordshire's 10 districts and boroughs since 1974

The proposed West Hertfordshire unitary authority from 2028 if the plans had gone ahead

In July 2026, it was announced that Dacorum Borough Council would be abolished and replaced by a new unitary authority, West Hertfordshire. The new authority would have been formed by merging Dacorum with the neighbouring City of St Albans as part of local government restructuring in England. Hertfordshire County Council and the other nine constituent district and borough councils in the county would have also ceased to exist, replaced by four single-tier authorities. Elections to the new "shadow" authorities would haven taken place in May 2027, before officially taking over on 1 April 2028.

In September 2026, the restructuring proposals for Hertfordshire were halted by the government and placed under review. In October 2026, plans to create it were withdrawn. The decision was threatened with judicial review by Hertfordshire County Council.

== See also ==
- Primary schools in Dacorum
