= 1984 Stockport Metropolitan Borough Council election =

Local election in Stockport

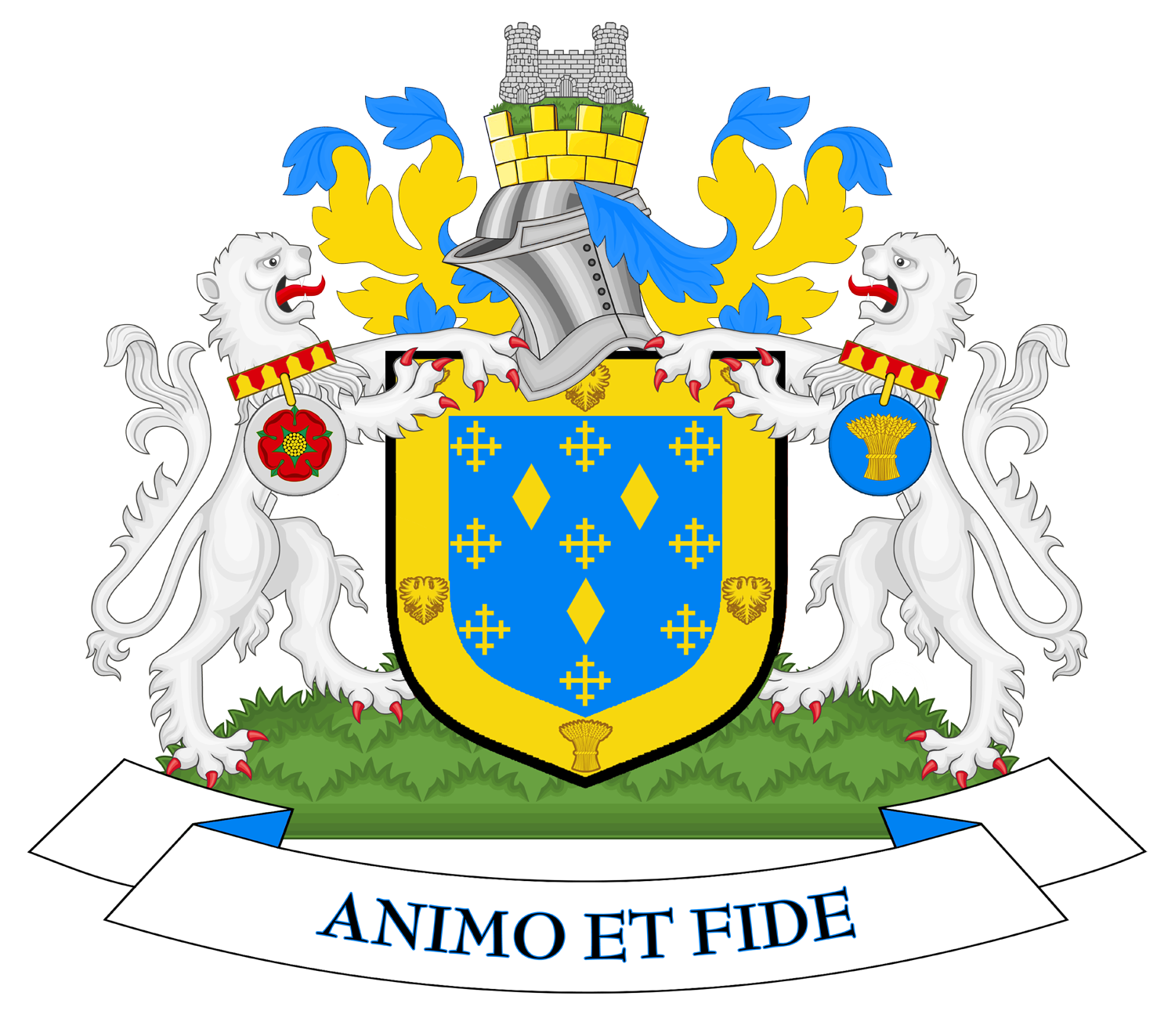
← 1983	3 May 1984	1986 →

21 of 63 seats to Stockport Metropolitan Borough Council 32 seats needed for a majority
	First party	Second party	Third party
Leader	John Lloyd	Alan Mobbs	Brian Leah
Party	Conservative	Labour	Alliance
Leader's seat	Heaton Moor	South Reddish	Cheadle Hulme South
Last election	8 seats, 39.3%	6 seats, 24.5%	7 seats, 32.5%
Seats before	30	18	12
Seats won	9	6	5
Seats after	28	17	15
Seat change	▼2	▼1	▲3
Popular vote	40,430	27,469	33,983
Percentage	38.5%	26.1%	32.3%
Swing	▼0.8%	▲1.6%	▼0.2%
	Fourth party
Leader	Ron Stenson
Party	Heald Green Ratepayers
Leader's seat	Heald Green
Last election	1 seat, 2.8%
Seats before	3
Seats won	1
Seats after	3
Seat change	Steady
Popular vote	3,112
Percentage	3.0%
Swing	▲0.2%
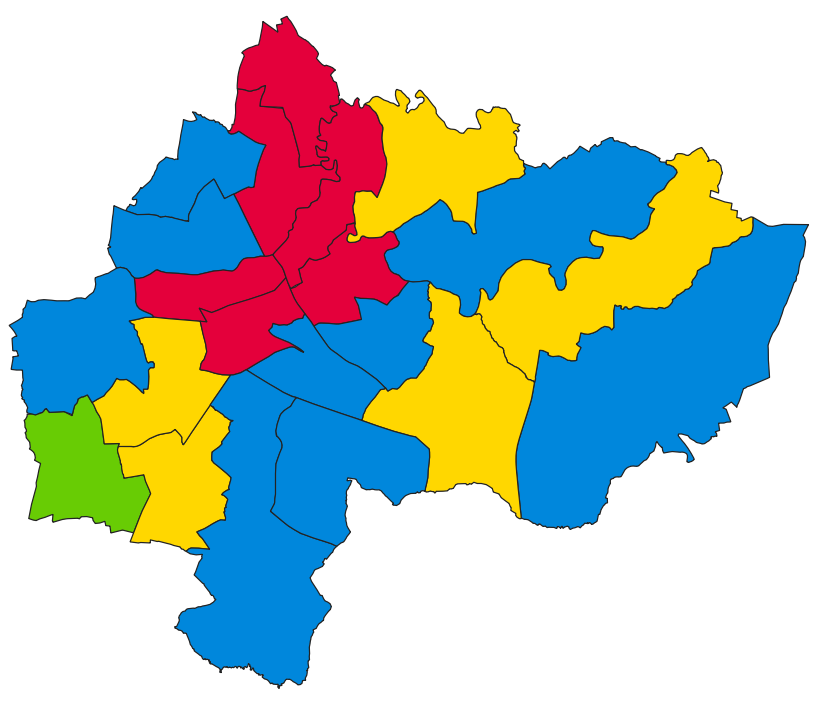
- Map of results of 1984 election
Leader of the Council before election
John Lloyd
Conservative
Leader of the Council after election
No leader
No overall control

Elections to Stockport Council were held on Thursday, 3 May 1984. One third of the council was up for election, with each successful candidate to serve a four-year term of office, expiring in 1988. The council remained under no overall control.

== Election result ==
Party	Votes		Seats			Full Council	
Conservative Party	40,430 (38.5%)	▼0.8	9 (42.8%)	9 / 21	▼2	28 (44.4%)	28 / 63
Labour Party	27,469 (26.1%)	▲1.6	6 (28.6%)	6 / 21	▼1	17 (27.0%)	17 / 63
Alliance	33,983 (32.3%)	▼0.2	5 (23.8%)	5 / 21	▲3	15 (23.8%)	15 / 63
Heald Green Ratepayers	3,112 (3.0%)	▲0.2	1 (4.8%)	1 / 21	Steady	3 (4.8%)	3 / 63
Communist	114 (0.1%)	▲0.1	0 (0.0%)	0 / 21	Steady	0 (0.0%)	0 / 63

↓
17	15	3	28

== Ward results ==
=== Bredbury ===
Bredbury
Party	Candidate	Votes	%	±%
Liberal	J. Humphries	2,658	48.3	−1.1
Labour	W. Prince*	1,454	26.4	+5.1
Conservative	A. M. Treharne	1,387	25.2	−3.4
Majority		1,204	21.9	+1.1
Turnout		5,499	50.9	−7.0
Liberal gain from Labour		Swing		

=== Brinnington ===
Brinnington
Party	Candidate	Votes	%	±%
Labour	M. Rowles*	2,847	75.9	+1.3
SDP	E. Howell	789	21.0	+10.4
Communist	D. Powell	114	3.0	N/A
Majority		2,058	54.9	−4.9
Turnout		3,750	43.6	−1.1
Labour hold		Swing		

=== Cale Green ===
Cale Green
Party	Candidate	Votes	%	±%
Labour	K. Bagnall*	2,204	56.2	+6.2
Conservative	A. Hibbitts	1,009	25.7	−3.7
SDP	P. Beatty	710	18.1	+0.1
Majority		1,195	30.5	+9.9
Turnout		3,923	42.0	−0.5
Labour hold		Swing		

=== Cheadle ===
Cheadle
Party	Candidate	Votes	%	±%
Conservative	L. Livesley	2,613	62.6	+2.2
Liberal	R. Graves	1,231	29.5	−3.2
Labour	R. Seddon	327	7.8	+0.9
Majority		1,382	33.1	+5.4
Turnout		4,171	42.5	−8.7
Conservative hold		Swing		

=== Cheadle Hulme North ===
Cheadle Hulme North
Party	Candidate	Votes	%	±%
Liberal	P. Porgess*	2,780	54.4	+0.2
Conservative	P. M. M. Thornber	1,782	34.9	−0.1
Labour	K. Parker	551	10.8	+0.9
Majority		998	19.5	+0.3
Turnout		5,113	45.2	−4.8
Liberal hold		Swing		

=== Cheadle Hulme South ===
Cheadle Hulme South
Party	Candidate	Votes	%	±%
Liberal	J. Hughes	3,074	48.5	+1.2
Conservative	W. Allen*	2,899	45.7	−1.5
Labour	R. Brown	368	5.8	+0.3
Majority		175	2.8	+2.7
Turnout		6,341	56.8	−2.2
Liberal gain from Conservative		Swing		

=== Davenport ===
Davenport
Party	Candidate	Votes	%	±%
Conservative	H. Dodd*	2,100	48.4	+0.2
Labour	I. Jackson	1,308	30.2	+1.6
SDP	S. M. Comer	916	21.2	+0.2
Majority		792	18.2	−1.6
Turnout		4,324	46.4	−2.2
Conservative hold		Swing		

=== East Bramhall ===
East Bramhall
Party	Candidate	Votes	%	±%
Conservative	D. Havers	3,387	53.4	+3.8
Liberal	J. C. Hart	2,657	41.9	−4.7
Labour	R. Fox	299	4.7	+0.9
Majority		730	11.5	+8.5
Turnout		6,343	50.6	−5.7
Conservative hold		Swing		

=== Edgeley ===
Edgeley
Party	Candidate	Votes	%	±%
Labour	M. A. Coffey	2,407	42.9	−2.4
Liberal	F. Davenport*	2,381	42.4	+1.1
Conservative	M. B. Brooks	822	14.7	−4.1
Majority		26	0.5	
Turnout		5,610	54.3	+4.4
Labour gain from Liberal		Swing		

=== Great Moor ===
Great Moor
Party	Candidate	Votes	%	±%
Conservative	P. Gamblin	2,230	40.2	−2.1
Labour	R. Heys*	1,719	31.0	−2.6
SDP	T. E. Pyle	1,592	28.7	+5.6
Majority		511	9.2	+0.5
Turnout		5,541	50.8	0
Conservative gain from Labour		Swing		

=== Hazel Grove ===
Hazel Grove
Party	Candidate	Votes	%	±%
Liberal	D. Seal	2,834	45.8	−6.8
Conservative	W. Lomas	2,753	44.5	+4.6
Labour	P. Wharton	606	9.8	+2.3
Majority		81	1.3	−11.4
Turnout		6,193	51.0	−4.5
Liberal gain from Conservative		Swing		

=== Heald Green ===
Heald Green
Party	Candidate	Votes	%	±%
Heald Green Ratepayers	R. Stenson*	3,112	71.3	+4.7
Conservative	K. A. Edis	633	14.5	−4.0
Labour	M. G. Lawley	391	9.0	+0.6
Liberal	I. Kirk	317	5.2	−1.3
Majority		2,479	56.8	+8.8
Turnout		4,364	42.1	−4.0
Heald Green Ratepayers hold		Swing		

=== Heaton Mersey ===
Heaton Mersey
Party	Candidate	Votes	%	±%
Conservative	E. Foulkes*	2,796	52.4	−0.7
Labour	J. McMullen	1,789	33.6	+2.9
SDP	S. Oldham	747	14.0	−0.5
Majority		1,007	18.9	−3.5
Turnout		5,332	48.1	−4.0
Conservative hold		Swing		

=== Heaton Moor ===
Heaton Moor
Party	Candidate	Votes	%	±%
Conservative	J. Lloyd*	2,575	59.6	+1.0
Labour	H. Nance	1,107	25.6	+5.9
Liberal	P. Kelly	642	14.8	−4.5
Majority		1,468	34.0	−4.9
Turnout		4,324	44.3	−3.4
Conservative hold		Swing		

=== Manor ===
Manor
Party	Candidate	Votes	%	±%
Labour	T. McGee	2,074	49.3	+6.8
Conservative	J. Hendry	1,521	36.2	+0.4
SDP	S. C. Rimmer	608	14.5	−5.4
Majority		553	13.2	+6.5
Turnout		4,203	44.2	−3.9
Labour hold		Swing		

=== North Marple ===
North Marple
Party	Candidate	Votes	%	±%
Liberal	J. Roberts	2,107	46.3	−3.0
Conservative	M. Taylor*	2,054	45.1	+3.2
Labour	R. Peachy	392	8.6	−0.2
Majority		53	1.2	−6.2
Turnout		4,553	51.3	−5.8
Liberal gain from Conservative		Swing		

=== North Reddish ===
North Reddish
Party	Candidate	Votes	%	±%
Labour	A. Flood*	3,041	62.1	+8.6
Conservative	M. Harris	1,313	26.8	−1.2
SDP	D. J. Whittle	546	11.1	−7.4
Majority		1,728	35.3	+9.8
Turnout		4,900	42.6	−5.2
Labour hold		Swing		

=== Romiley ===
Romiley
Party	Candidate	Votes	%	±%
Conservative	H. Whitehead*	2,468	42.8	+2.8
Liberal	C. Napier	2,228	38.6	+0.9
Labour	W. Greaves	1,071	18.6	−3.7
Majority		240	4.2	+1.9
Turnout		5,767	50.1	−1.0
Conservative hold		Swing		

=== South Marple ===
South Marple
Party	Candidate	Votes	%	±%
Conservative	C. Mason*	2,685	51.0	+6.4
Liberal	A. Ashworth	2,269	43.1	−4.8
Labour	N. Eadie	310	5.9	−0.3
Majority		416	7.9	
Turnout		5,264	53.4	−2.6
Conservative hold		Swing		

=== South Reddish ===
South Reddish
Party	Candidate	Votes	%	±%
Labour	A. Bradbury*	2,772	65.4	+9.0
SDP	E. Harding	1,467	34.6	+20.6
Majority		1,305	30.8	+3.0
Turnout		4,239	38.9	−5.7
Labour hold		Swing		

=== West Bramhall ===
West Bramhall
Party	Candidate	Votes	%	±%
Conservative	D. West	3,403	64.6	−3.0
SDP	P. C. O. Vittoz	1,430	27.2	+2.8
Labour	D. Harris	432	8.2	+1.6
Majority		1,973	37.4	−5.8
Turnout		5,265	44.4	−5.6
Conservative hold		Swing		
