= 1987 Stockport Metropolitan Borough Council election =

Local election in Stockport

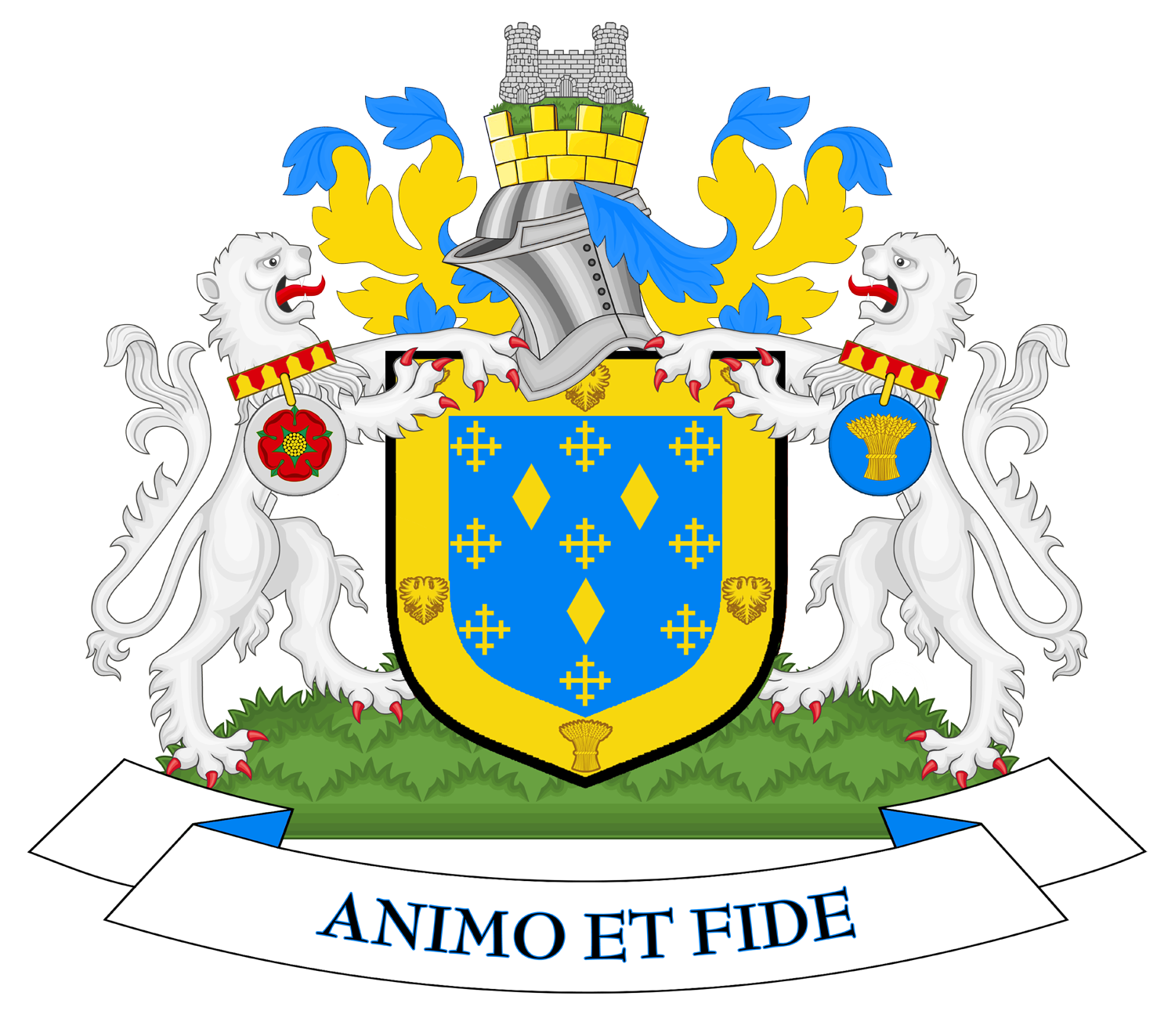
← 1986	7 May 1987	1988 →

21 of 63 seats to Stockport Metropolitan Borough Council 32 seats needed for a majority
	First party	Second party	Third party
Leader	John Needham	John Ashworth	Alan Mobbs
Party	Conservative	Alliance	Labour
Leader's seat	Cheadle	Edgeley	South Reddish
Last election	7 seats, 31.6%	7 seats, 37.0%	6 seats, 26.8%
Seats before	24	18	17
Seats won	6	10	4
Seats after	22	22	15
Seat change	▼2	▲4	▼2
Popular vote	45,021	43,708	24,484
Percentage	38.3%	37.1%	20.8%
Swing	▲6.7%	▲0.1%	▼6.0%
	Fourth party	Fifth party
Leader	Ron Stenson	Arthur Bradbury
Party	Heald Green Ratepayers	Independent Labour
Leader's seat	Heald Green	South Reddish
Last election	1 seat, 2.8%	0 seats, 0.0%
Seats before	3	1
Seats won	1	0
Seats after	3	1
Seat change	Steady	Steady
Popular vote	3,556	0
Percentage	3.0%	0.0%
Swing	▲0.2%	N/A
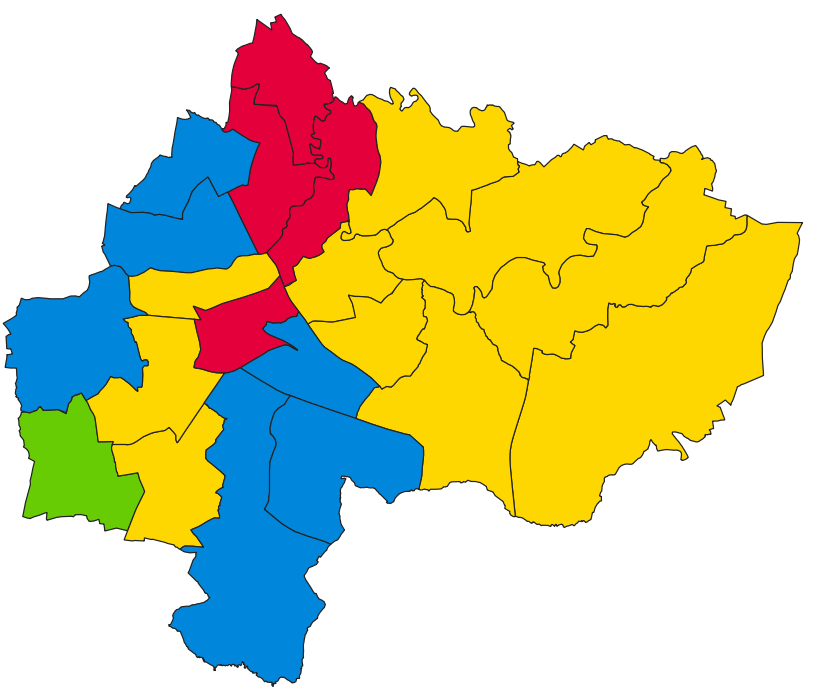
- Map of results of 1987 election
Leader of the Council before election
No leader
No overall control
Leader of the Council after election
No leader
No overall control

Elections to Stockport Council were held on Thursday, 7 May 1987. One third of the council was up for election, with each successful candidate to serve a four-year term of office, expiring in 1991. The council remained under no overall control.

== Election result ==
Party	Votes		Seats			Full Council	
Conservative Party	45,021 (38.3%)	▲6.7	6 (28.6%)	6 / 21	▼2	22 (34.9%)	22 / 63
Alliance	43,708 (37.1%)	▲0.1	10 (47.6%)	10 / 21	▲4	22 (34.9%)	22 / 63
Labour Party	24,484 (20.8%)	▼6.0	4 (19.0%)	4 / 21	▼2	15 (23.8%)	15 / 63
Heald Green Ratepayers	3,556 (3.0%)	▲0.2	1 (4.8%)	1 / 21	Steady	3 (4.8%)	3 / 63
Independent Labour	0 (0.0%)	Steady	0 (0.0%)	0 / 21	Steady	1 (1.6%)	1 / 63
Green Party	884 (0.8%)	▼0.9	0 (0.0%)	0 / 21	Steady	0 (0.0%)	0 / 63

↓
1	15	22	3	22

== Ward results ==
=== Bredbury ===
Bredbury
Party	Candidate	Votes	%	±%
Liberal	G. Stafford	3,005	52.9	−4.6
Conservative	S. Frost	1,567	27.6	+8.1
Labour	J. Woodrow	1,109	19.5	−3.6
Majority		1,438	25.3	−9.1
Turnout		5,681	50.7	+9.2
Liberal hold		Swing		

=== Brinnington ===
Brinnington
Party	Candidate	Votes	%	±%
Labour	C. MacAlister*	2,546	73.8	−8.9
SDP	H. Griffiths	479	13.9	−3.4
Conservative	A. Leeke	425	12.3	N/A
Majority		2,067	59.9	−5.7
Turnout		3,450	40.8	+3.1
Labour hold		Swing		

=== Cale Green ===
Cale Green
Party	Candidate	Votes	%	±%
Labour	B. Bradbury*	1,723	40.1	−13.7
SDP	A. Shaw	1,704	39.7	+12.7
Conservative	L. Jones	865	20.2	+2.8
Majority		19	0.4	−26.4
Turnout		4,292	45.9	+4.7
Labour hold		Swing		

=== Cheadle ===
Cheadle
Party	Candidate	Votes	%	±%
Conservative	I. Roberts	2,856	52.9	+1.0
Liberal	J. Wolfe	2,212	40.9	+3.5
Labour	A. Kellett	335	6.2	−1.5
Majority		644	12.0	−2.5
Turnout		5,403	54.2	+10.3
Conservative hold		Swing		

=== Cheadle Hulme North ===
Cheadle Hulme North
Party	Candidate	Votes	%	±%
Liberal	J. Pantall*	3,122	52.1	−0.9
Conservative	V. Brooks	2,222	37.1	+5.2
Labour	D. Bennett	589	9.8	−4.1
Green	I. Boyd	62	1.0	−0.2
Majority		900	15.0	−6.1
Turnout		5,995	50.7	+9.4
Liberal hold		Swing		

=== Cheadle Hulme South ===
Cheadle Hulme South
Party	Candidate	Votes	%	±%
Liberal	F. Ridley	3,555	54.1	−6.0
Conservative	S. Furnival	2,636	40.1	+8.0
Labour	I. Hamilton	289	4.4	−1.5
Green	I. McFadden	88	1.3	−0.5
Majority		919	14.0	−14.0
Turnout		6,568	57.7	+4.6
Liberal hold		Swing		

=== Davenport ===
Davenport
Party	Candidate	Votes	%	±%
Conservative	B. Haley*	2,259	45.9	+7.3
Labour	M. Jones	1,504	30.5	−5.1
SDP	J. Grimshaw	1,031	20.9	−1.3
Green	C. Wharf	130	2.6	−1.0
Majority		755	15.4	+12.4
Turnout		4,924	52.0	+8.1
Conservative hold		Swing		

=== East Bramhall ===
East Bramhall
Party	Candidate	Votes	%	±%
Conservative	K. Holt*	4,320	59.6	+7.8
SDP	J. Pruce	2,552	35.2	−5.6
Labour	W. Greaves	372	5.1	−2.2
Majority		1,768	24.4	+13.4
Turnout		7,244	55.7	+8.9
Conservative hold		Swing		

=== Edgeley ===
Edgeley
Party	Candidate	Votes	%	±%
Liberal	F. Davenport	3,336	59.6	+9.8
Labour	W. Prince	1,584	28.3	−11.3
Conservative	S. Speakman	624	11.1	+2.1
Green	S. Filmore	55	1.0	−0.5
Majority		1,752	31.3	+21.1
Turnout		5,599	55.3	−0.4
Liberal gain from Labour		Swing		

=== Great Moor ===
Great Moor
Party	Candidate	Votes	%	±%
SDP	T. E. Pyle	2,554	41.8	+9.1
Conservative	K. Ashworth*	1,805	29.6	−1.0
Labour	W. Barrett	1,708	28.0	−7.4
Green	S. Boyd	37	0.6	−0.7
Majority		749	12.2	
Turnout		6,104	55.1	+5.8
SDP gain from Conservative		Swing		

=== Hazel Grove ===
Hazel Grove
Party	Candidate	Votes	%	±%
Liberal	D. Robinson*	3,340	47.2	+3.8
Conservative	T. Dunstan	3,095	43.7	−0.3
Labour	M. Wallis	553	7.8	−2.6
Green	S. Ledger	93	1.3	−0.9
Majority		245	3.5	
Turnout		7,081	57.3	+10.4
Liberal hold		Swing		

=== Heald Green ===
Heald Green
Party	Candidate	Votes	%	±%
Heald Green Ratepayers	N. Fields*	3,556	70.2	+3.0
Conservative	K. A. Edis	812	16.0	+1.8
Labour	J. Becker	357	7.0	−3.2
Liberal	I. Kirk	340	6.7	−0.4
Majority		2,744	54.2	+1.2
Turnout		5,065	47.7	+8.0
Heald Green Ratepayers hold		Swing		

=== Heaton Mersey ===
Heaton Mersey
Party	Candidate	Votes	%	±%
Conservative	V. Burgon*	3,367	53.5	+8.3
Labour	S. Bailey	1,613	25.6	−7.0
SDP	S. Oldham	1,318	20.9	+0.6
Majority		1,754	27.9	+15.3
Turnout		6,298	54.0	+5.8
Conservative hold		Swing		

=== Heaton Moor ===
Heaton Moor
Party	Candidate	Votes	%	±%
Conservative	W. Crook*	2,955	59.1	+8.8
SDP	I. Lomas	987	19.7	−1.4
Labour	H. Nance	964	19.3	−6.8
Green	F. Chapman	98	2.0	−0.4
Majority		1,968	39.3	+15.1
Turnout		5,004	50.2	+6.7
Conservative hold		Swing		

=== Manor ===
Manor
Party	Candidate	Votes	%	±%
Liberal	A. Corris	2,590	49.3	+16.8
Labour	W. McCann*	1,669	31.8	−11.9
Conservative	K. Coups	948	18.0	−3.6
Green	G. Johnson	47	0.9	−1.3
Majority		921	17.5	
Turnout		5,254	54.0	+10.4
Liberal gain from Labour		Swing		

=== North Marple ===
North Marple
Party	Candidate	Votes	%	±%
Liberal	B. Harrison*	2,608	49.3	−0.7
Conservative	M. Taylor	2,129	40.2	+2.9
Labour	T. Lodge	468	8.8	−1.6
Green	J. Armstrong	88	1.7	−0.7
Majority		479	9.1	−3.6
Turnout		5,293	57.8	+6.6
Liberal hold		Swing		

=== North Reddish ===
North Reddish
Party	Candidate	Votes	%	±%
Labour	P. Scott	3,209	63.2	−7.1
Conservative	J. Camblin	1,865	36.8	N/A
Majority		1,344	26.4	−18.2
Turnout		5,074	43.2	+6.5
Labour hold		Swing		

=== Romiley ===
Romiley
Party	Candidate	Votes	%	±%
SDP	J. Ingham	2,811	45.4	+4.2
Conservative	B. Sadowski	2,446	39.5	+2.4
Labour	J. Nelson	941	15.2	−6.4
Majority		365	5.9	+1.8
Turnout		6,198	53.3	+7.1
SDP gain from Conservative		Swing		

=== South Marple ===
South Marple
Party	Candidate	Votes	%	±%
Liberal	E. Kime*	3,082	51.3	+1.6
Conservative	H. Coase	2,522	42.0	+0.4
Labour	S. Humphries	290	4.8	−1.4
Green	N. Watson	117	1.9	−0.6
Majority		560	9.3	+1.2
Turnout		6,011	59.6	+8.2
Liberal hold		Swing		

=== South Reddish ===
South Reddish
Party	Candidate	Votes	%	±%
Labour	S. Broadhurst	2,341	48.8	−16.9
Conservative	R. Camblin	1,528	31.9	N/A
SDP	A. McClean	856	17.9	−11.7
Green	M. Ledger	69	1.4	−3.3
Majority		813	16.9	−19.3
Turnout		4,794	43.9	+7.1
Labour hold		Swing		

=== West Bramhall ===
West Bramhall
Party	Candidate	Votes	%	±%
Conservative	J. Green*	3,775	59.7	+1.1
Liberal	M. Walker	2,226	35.2	+3.4
Labour	F. Cooper	320	5.1	−2.7
Majority		1,549	24.5	−2.3
Turnout		6,321	52.4	+8.8
Conservative hold		Swing		
