= 1986 Stockport Metropolitan Borough Council election =

Local election in Stockport

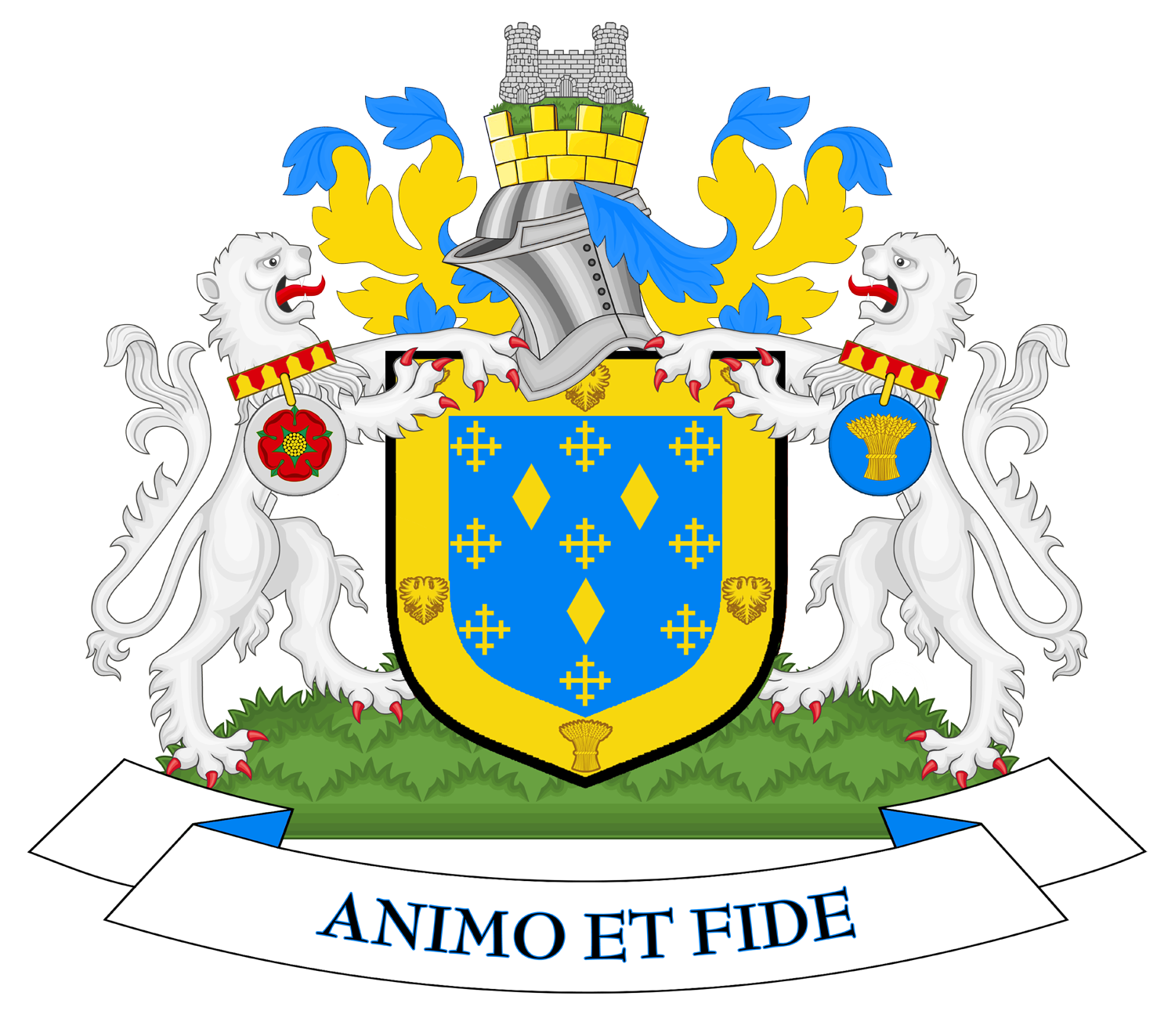
← 1984	8 May 1986	1987 →

21 of 63 seats to Stockport Metropolitan Borough Council 32 seats needed for a majority
	First party	Second party	Third party
Leader	John Lloyd	John Ashworth	Alan Mobbs
Party	Conservative	Alliance	Labour
Leader's seat	Heaton Moor	Edgeley	South Reddish
Last election	9 seats, 38.5%	5 seats, 32.3%	6 seats, 26.1%
Seats before	28	15	15
Seats won	7	7	6
Seats after	24	18	16
Seat change	▼4	▲3	▲1
Popular vote	32,052	37,476	27,186
Percentage	31.6%	37.0%	26.8%
Swing	▼6.9%	▲4.7%	▲0.7%
	Fourth party	Fifth party
Leader	Ron Stenson	Arthur Bradbury
Party	Heald Green Ratepayers	Independent Labour
Leader's seat	Heald Green	South Reddish
Last election	1 seat, 3.0%	did not contest
Seats before	3	2
Seats won	1	0
Seats after	3	2
Seat change	Steady	Steady
Popular vote	2,834	0
Percentage	2.8%	0.0%
Swing	▼0.2%	N/A
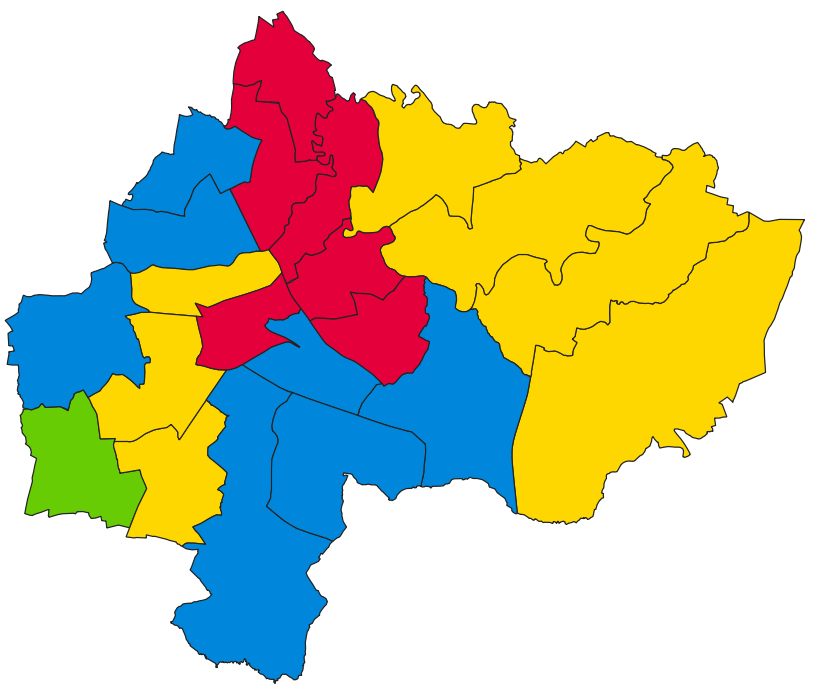
- Map of results of 1986 election
Leader of the Council before election
No leader
No overall control
Leader of the Council after election
No leader
No overall control

Elections to Stockport Council were held on Thursday, 8 May 1986. One third of the council was up for election, with each successful candidate to serve a four-year term of office, expiring in 1990. The council remained under no overall control.

== Election result ==
Party	Votes		Seats			Full Council	
Conservative Party	32,052 (31.6%)	▼6.9	7 (33.3%)	7 / 21	▼4	24 (38.1%)	24 / 63
Alliance	37,476 (37.0%)	▲4.7	7 (33.3%)	7 / 21	▲3	18 (28.6%)	18 / 63
Labour Party	27,186 (26.8%)	▲0.7	6 (28.6%)	6 / 21	▲1	16 (25.4%)	16 / 63
Heald Green Ratepayers	2,834 (2.8%)	▼0.2	1 (4.8%)	1 / 21	Steady	3 (4.8%)	3 / 63
Independent Labour	0 (0.0%)	N/A	0 (0.0%)	0 / 21	Steady	2 (3.2%)	2 / 63
Green Party	1,764 (1.7%)	N/A	0 (0.0%)	0 / 21	N/A	0 (0.0%)	0 / 63
Revolutionary Communist	59 (0.1%)	N/A	0 (0.0%)	0 / 21	N/A	0 (0.0%)	0 / 63

↓
2	16	18	3	24

== Ward results ==
=== Bredbury ===
Bredbury
Party	Candidate	Votes	%	±%
Liberal	D. Humphries*	2,672	57.5	+9.2
Labour	J. Woodrow	1,072	23.1	−3.3
Conservative	T. Stones	906	19.5	−5.7
Majority		1,600	34.4	+12.5
Turnout		4,650	41.5	−9.4
Liberal hold		Swing		

=== Brinnington ===
Brinnington
Party	Candidate	Votes	%	±%
Labour	E. Gallacher	2,635	82.7	+6.8
SDP	H. Griffiths	550	17.3	−3.7
Majority		2,085	65.6	+10.7
Turnout		3,185	37.7	−5.9
Labour hold		Swing		

=== Cale Green ===
Cale Green
Party	Candidate	Votes	%	±%
Labour	R. Boyd*	2,073	53.8	−2.4
SDP	A. Shaw	1,041	27.0	+8.9
Conservative	L. Jones	672	17.4	−8.3
Green	S. Jackson	69	1.8	N/A
Majority		1,032	26.8	−3.7
Turnout		3,855	41.2	−0.8
Labour hold		Swing		

=== Cheadle ===
Cheadle
Party	Candidate	Votes	%	±%
Conservative	J. Needham*	2,270	51.9	−10.7
Liberal	J. Wolfe	1,635	37.4	+7.9
Labour	C. Goodrich	382	8.7	+0.9
Green	I. Boyd	86	2.0	N/A
Majority		635	14.5	−18.6
Turnout		4,373	43.9	+1.4
Conservative hold		Swing		

=== Cheadle Hulme North ===
Cheadle Hulme North
Party	Candidate	Votes	%	±%
Liberal	K. Anstis*	2,589	53.0	−1.4
Conservative	V. Brooks	1,556	31.9	−3.0
Labour	S. Bennett	678	13.9	+3.1
Green	D. Dick	58	1.2	N/A
Majority		1,033	21.1	+1.6
Turnout		4,881	41.3	−3.9
Liberal hold		Swing		

=== Cheadle Hulme South ===
Cheadle Hulme South
Party	Candidate	Votes	%	±%
Liberal	B. Leah*	3,627	60.1	+11.6
Conservative	E. Minshull	1,939	32.1	−13.6
Labour	R. Brown	359	5.9	+0.1
Green	J. Armstrong	110	1.8	N/A
Majority		1,688	28.0	+25.2
Turnout		6,035	53.1	−3.7
Liberal hold		Swing		

=== Davenport ===
Davenport
Party	Candidate	Votes	%	±%
Conservative	B. Downs	1,603	38.6	−9.8
Labour	D. Harris	1,480	35.6	+5.4
SDP	J. Grimshaw	922	22.2	+1.0
Green	C. Wharf	150	3.6	N/A
Majority		123	3.0	−15.2
Turnout		4,155	43.9	−2.5
Conservative hold		Swing		

=== East Bramhall ===
East Bramhall
Party	Candidate	Votes	%	±%
Conservative	A. Doherty*	3,158	51.8	−1.6
Liberal	G. Livesey	2,489	40.8	−1.1
Labour	W. Greaves	447	7.3	+2.6
Majority		669	11.0	−0.5
Turnout		6,049	46.8	−3.8
Conservative hold		Swing		

=== Edgeley ===
Edgeley
Party	Candidate	Votes	%	±%
Liberal	J. Ashworth*	2,813	49.8	+7.4
Labour	P. Scott	2,235	39.6	−3.3
Conservative	G. Coales	508	9.0	−5.7
Green	S. Filmore	87	1.5	N/A
Majority		578	10.2	
Turnout		5,643	55.7	+1.4
Liberal hold		Swing		

=== Great Moor ===
Great Moor
Party	Candidate	Votes	%	±%
Labour	P. Wharton	1,931	35.4	+4.4
SDP	T. E. Pyle	1,782	32.7	+4.0
Conservative	I. Roberts*	1,670	30.6	−9.6
Green	K. Darwin	73	1.3	N/A
Majority		149	2.7	
Turnout		5,456	49.3	−1.5
Labour gain from Conservative		Swing		

=== Hazel Grove ===
Hazel Grove
Party	Candidate	Votes	%	±%
Conservative	A. Law*	2,548	44.0	−0.5
Liberal	C. Beaver	2,510	43.4	−2.4
Labour	K. Stapleford	601	10.4	+0.6
Green	S. Ledger	129	2.2	N/A
Majority		38	0.6	
Turnout		5,788	46.9	−4.1
Conservative hold		Swing		

=== Heald Green ===
Heald Green
Party	Candidate	Votes	%	±%
Heald Green Ratepayers	P. Burns*	2,834	67.2	−4.1
Conservative	K. A. Edis	597	14.2	−0.3
Labour	K. Parker	431	10.2	+1.2
Liberal	F. Ridley	301	7.1	+1.9
Green	E. Hawthorne	55	1.3	N/A
Majority		2,237	53.0	−3.8
Turnout		4,218	39.7	−2.4
Heald Green Ratepayers hold		Swing		

=== Heaton Mersey ===
Heaton Mersey
Party	Candidate	Votes	%	±%
Conservative	P. Whitney*	2,540	45.2	−7.2
Labour	S. Broadhurst	1,830	32.6	−1.0
SDP	S. Oldham	1,141	20.3	+6.3
Green	G. Leatherbarrow	107	1.9	N/A
Majority		710	12.6	−6.3
Turnout		5,618	48.2	+0.1
Conservative hold		Swing		

=== Heaton Moor ===
Heaton Moor
Party	Candidate	Votes	%	±%
Conservative	J. A. MacCarron*	2,183	50.3	−9.3
Labour	H. Nance	1,134	26.1	+0.5
SDP	D. Owen	917	21.1	+6.3
Green	F. Chapman	104	2.4	N/A
Majority		1,049	24.2	−9.8
Turnout		4,338	43.5	−0.8
Conservative hold		Swing		

=== Manor ===
Manor
Party	Candidate	Votes	%	±%
Labour	I. Jackson	1,852	43.7	−5.6
Liberal	A. Corris	1,378	32.5	+18.0
Conservative	K. Coups	917	21.6	−14.6
Green	G. Johnson	95	2.2	N/A
Majority		474	11.2	−2.0
Turnout		4,242	43.6	−0.6
Labour hold		Swing		

=== North Marple ===
North Marple
Party	Candidate	Votes	%	±%
Liberal	D. Bradley	2,343	50.0	+3.4
Conservative	B. Sharkey	1,747	37.3	−7.8
Labour	M. Jones	486	10.4	+1.8
Green	R. Bamforth	113	2.4	N/A
Majority		596	12.7	+11.5
Turnout		4,689	51.2	−0.1
Liberal gain from Conservative		Swing		

=== North Reddish ===
North Reddish
Party	Candidate	Votes	%	±%
Labour	P. Halliday*	3,031	70.3	+8.2
SDP	P. O'Connell	1,106	25.7	+14.6
Green	D. Raikes	114	2.6	N/A
Revolutionary Communist	K. Lavin	59	1.4	N/A
Majority		1,925	44.6	+9.3
Turnout		4,310	36.7	−5.9
Labour hold		Swing		

=== Romiley ===
Romiley
Party	Candidate	Votes	%	±%
Liberal	E. Wilson	2,216	41.2	+2.6
Conservative	P. Gilleney*	1,996	37.1	−5.7
Labour	J. Nelson	1,161	21.6	+3.0
Majority		220	4.1	
Turnout		5,373	46.2	−3.9
Liberal gain from Conservative		Swing		

=== South Marple ===
South Marple
Party	Candidate	Votes	%	±%
Liberal	M. Jackson	2,577	49.7	+6.6
Conservative	S. Windle	2,158	41.6	−9.4
Labour	G. B. Slack	320	6.2	+0.3
Green	N. Watson	128	2.5	N/A
Majority		419	8.1	
Turnout		5,183	51.4	−2.0
Liberal gain from Conservative		Swing		

=== South Reddish ===
South Reddish
Party	Candidate	Votes	%	±%
Labour	A. Mobbs*	2,635	65.7	+0.3
SDP	A. McClean	1,185	29.6	−5.0
Green	M. Ledger	190	4.7	N/A
Majority		1,450	36.2	+5.4
Turnout		4,010	36.8	−2.1
Labour hold		Swing		

=== West Bramhall ===
West Bramhall
Party	Candidate	Votes	%	±%
Conservative	J. B. Leck*	3,084	58.6	−6.0
SDP	P. C. O. Vittoz	1,673	31.8	+4.6
Labour	B. Farebrother	413	7.8	−0.4
Green	N. Bamber	96	1.8	N/A
Majority		1,411	26.8	−10.6
Turnout		5,266	43.6	−0.8
Conservative hold		Swing		
