= 1980 Stockport Metropolitan Borough Council election =

Local election in Stockport

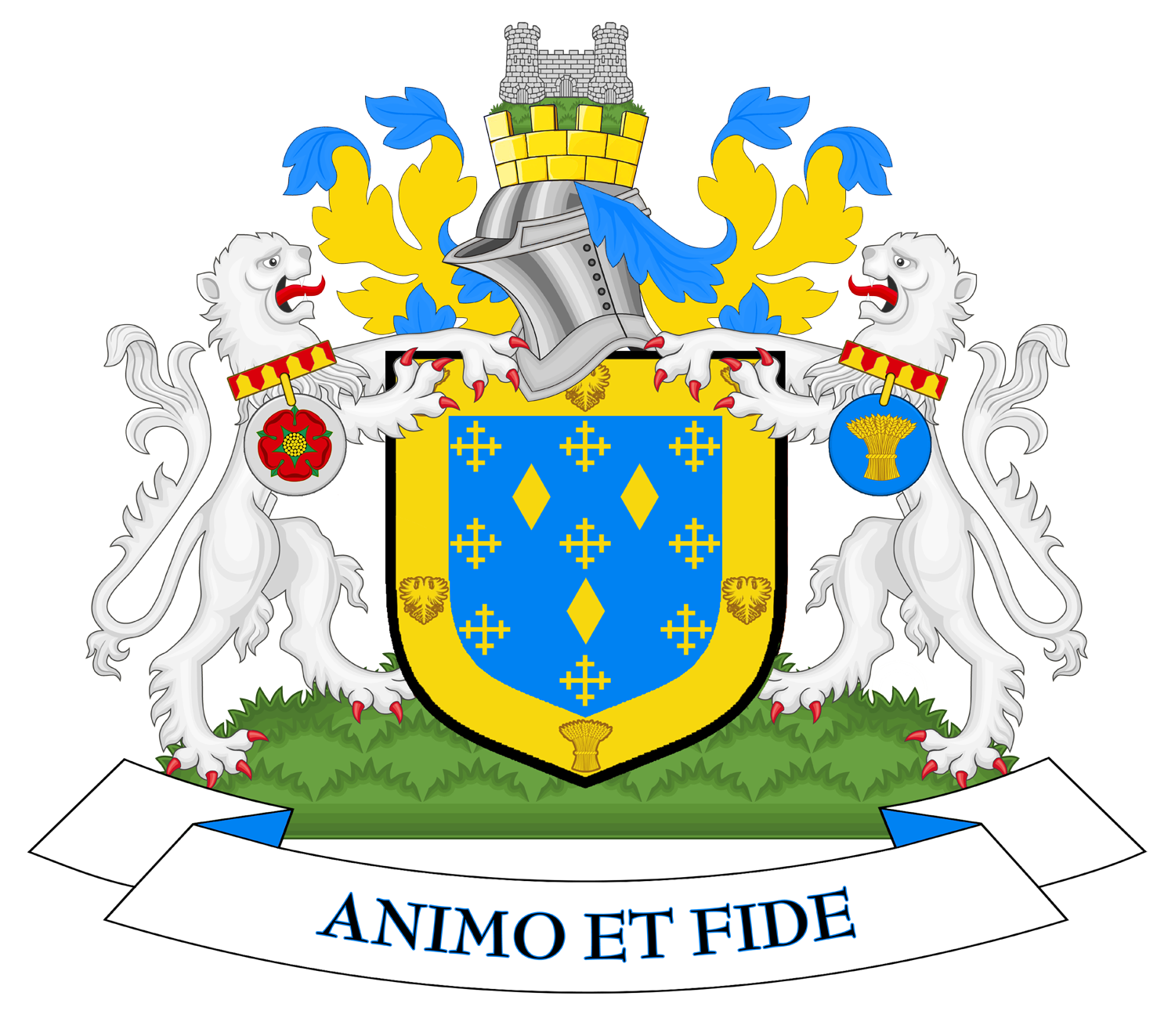
← 1979	1 May 1980	1982 →

23 of 63 seats to Stockport Metropolitan Borough Council 32 seats needed for a majority
	First party	Second party	Third party
Leader	John Lloyd	Bernard Bradbury	Brian Leah
Party	Conservative	Labour	Liberal
Leader's seat	Heaton Moor	Reddish North	Cheadle Hulme South
Last election	11 seats, 45.3%	6 seats, 26.6%	2 seats, 24.6%
Seats before	35	16	6
Seats won	11	10	1
Seats after	33	22	5
Seat change	▼2	▲6	▼1
Popular vote	43,134	36,593	24,477
Percentage	39.9%	33.9%	22.7%
Swing	▼5.4%	▲7.3%	▼1.9%
	Fourth party
Leader	Robert Crook
Party	Heald Green Ratepayers
Leader's seat	Heald Green
Last election	1 seat, 3.0%
Seats before	3
Seats won	1
Seats after	3
Seat change	Steady
Popular vote	2,843
Percentage	2.6%
Swing	▼0.4%
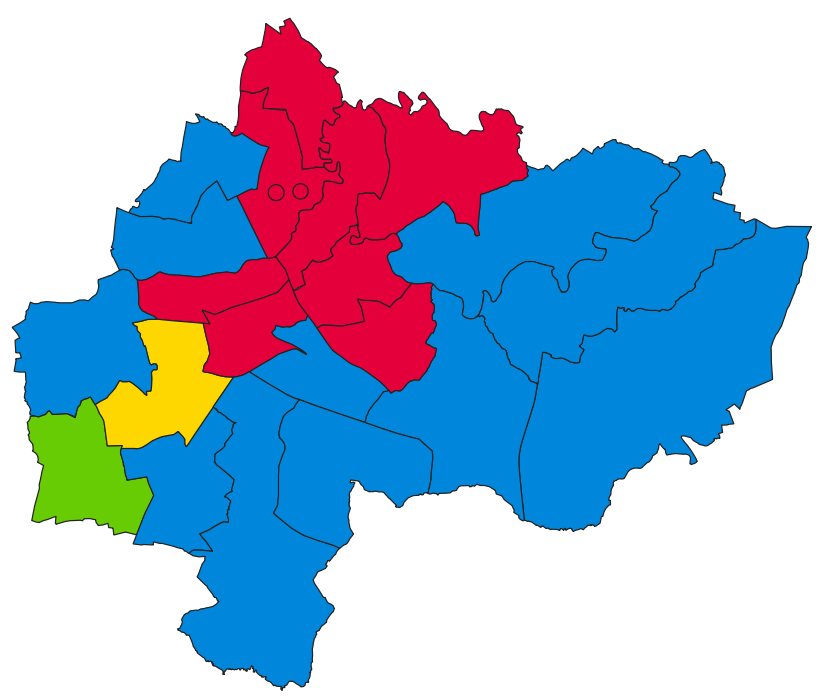
- Map of results of 1980 election
Leader of the Council before election
John Lloyd
Conservative
Leader of the Council after election
John Lloyd
Conservative

Elections to Stockport Council were held on Thursday, 1 May 1980. One third of the council was up for election, with each successful candidate to serve a four-year term of office, expiring in 1984. The Conservative Party retained overall control of the council.

== Election result ==
Party	Votes		Seats			Full Council	
Conservative Party	43,134 (39.9%)	▼5.4	11 (47.8%)	11 / 23	▼2	33 (52.4%)	33 / 63
Labour Party	36,593 (33.9%)	▲7.3	10 (43.5%)	10 / 23	▲6	22 (34.9%)	22 / 63
Liberal Party	24,477 (22.7%)	▼1.9	1 (4.3%)	1 / 23	▼1	5 (7.9%)	5 / 63
Heald Green Ratepayers	2,843 (2.6%)	▼0.4	1 (4.3%)	1 / 23	Steady	3 (4.8%)	3 / 63
Residents	366 (0.3%)	▲0.1	0 (0.0%)	0 / 23	Steady	0 (0.0%)	0 / 63
Independent Liberal	343 (0.3%)	N/A	0 (0.0%)	0 / 23	N/A	0 (0.0%)	0 / 63
Independent	199 (0.2%)	Steady	0 (0.0%)	0 / 23	Steady	0 (0.0%)	0 / 63
Communist	60 (0.1%)	▼0.1	0 (0.0%)	0 / 23	Steady	0 (0.0%)	0 / 63

↓
22	5	3	33

== Ward results ==
=== Bredbury ===
Bredbury
Party	Candidate	Votes	%	±%
Labour	W. Prince	1,848	34.9	
Conservative	R. Walker*	1,810	34.1	
Liberal	D. Humphries	1,643	31.0	
Majority		38	0.8	
Turnout		5,301	50.4	
Labour gain from Conservative		Swing		

=== Brinnington ===
Brinnington
Party	Candidate	Votes	%	±%
Labour	M. Rowles	3,008	82.8	
Conservative	F. Field	418	11.5	
Liberal	E. Fantom	206	5.7	
Majority		2,590	71.3	
Turnout		3,632	40.0	
Labour hold		Swing		

=== Cale Green ===
Cale Green
Party	Candidate	Votes	%	±%
Labour	K. Bagnall	2,175	58.5	
Conservative	F. Field	1,109	29.8	
Liberal	V. Corner	350	9.4	
Independent	K. Walker	86	2.3	
Majority		1,066	28.7	
Turnout		3,720	39.8	
Labour hold		Swing		

=== Cheadle ===
Cheadle
Party	Candidate	Votes	%	±%
Conservative	R. Manning	2,825	67.5	
Liberal	M. Christian	913	21.8	
Labour	R. Brown	445	10.6	
Majority		1,912	45.7	
Turnout		4,183	43.5	
Conservative gain from Liberal		Swing		

=== Cheadle Hulme North ===
Cheadle Hulme North
Party	Candidate	Votes	%	±%
Liberal	P. Porgess*	2,551	47.5	
Conservative	B. Thompson*	2,135	39.8	
Labour	D. McMillan	681	12.7	
Majority		416	7.7	
Turnout		5,367	49.0	
Liberal gain from Conservative		Swing		

=== Cheadle Hulme South ===
Cheadle Hulme South
Party	Candidate	Votes	%	±%
Conservative	W. Allen*	2,872	50.3	
Liberal	B. Rees	2,414	42.3	
Labour	R. Perry	423	7.4	
Majority		458	8.0	
Turnout		5,709	53.0	
Conservative hold		Swing		

=== Davenport ===
Davenport
Party	Candidate	Votes	%	±%
Conservative	H. Dodd*	1,849	47.6	
Labour	P. Scott	1,578	40.6	
Liberal	D. Muskett	457	11.8	
Majority		271	7.0	
Turnout		3,884	42.6	
Conservative hold		Swing		

=== East Bramhall ===
East Bramhall
Party	Candidate	Votes	%	±%
Conservative	D. Havers*	3,105	56.4	
Liberal	J. Hart	1,707	31.0	
Residents	T. Purves	366	6.6	
Labour	J. Roy	332	6.0	
Majority		1,398	25.4	
Turnout		5,510	47.4	
Conservative hold		Swing		

=== Edgeley ===
Edgeley
Party	Candidate	Votes	%	±%
Labour	P. Davison	2,407	49.6	
Liberal	J. Ashworth	1,533	31.6	
Conservative	H. Blackmore	804	16.6	
Independent	W. Statham	113	2.3	
Majority		874	18.0	
Turnout		4,857	46.3	
Labour gain from Liberal		Swing		

=== Great Moor ===
Great Moor
Party	Candidate	Votes	%	±%
Labour	R. Heys	2,202	45.2	
Conservative	C. Toman	2,117	43.5	
Liberal	R. Quayle	553	11.4	
Majority		85	1.7	
Turnout		4,872	44.8	
Labour gain from Conservative		Swing		

=== Hazel Grove ===
Hazel Grove
Party	Candidate	Votes	%	±%
Conservative	B. Miller*	2,273	44.8	
Liberal	D. Robinson	1,811	35.7	
Labour	E. Hoad	985	19.4	
Majority		462	9.1	
Turnout		5,069	44.7	
Conservative hold		Swing		

=== Heald Green ===
Heald Green
Party	Candidate	Votes	%	±%
Heald Green Ratepayers	R. Stenson*	2,843	63.0	
Conservative	A. Roney	876	19.4	
Labour	M. Lawley	400	8.9	
Liberal	A. Welch	395	8.8	
Majority		1,967	43.6	
Turnout		4,514	43.5	
Heald Green Ratepayers hold		Swing		

=== Heaton Mersey ===
Heaton Mersey
Party	Candidate	Votes	%	±%
Conservative	E. Foulkes*	2,482	50.3	
Labour	J. McMullen	1,913	38.8	
Liberal	S. Langrish	537	10.9	
Majority		569	11.5	
Turnout		4,932	44.9	
Conservative hold		Swing		

=== Heaton Moor ===
Heaton Moor
Party	Candidate	Votes	%	±%
Conservative	J. Lloyd*	2,414	58.7	
Labour	D. Solomon	1,169	28.4	
Liberal	M. Robinson	531	12.9	
Majority		1,245	30.3	
Turnout		4,114	41.9	
Conservative hold		Swing		

=== Manor ===
Manor
Party	Candidate	Votes	%	±%
Labour	R. Fox*	2,272	58.7	
Conservative	E. Howard	1,188	30.7	
Liberal	A. Madeley	410	10.6	
Majority		1,084	28.0	
Turnout		3,870	42.3	
Labour hold		Swing		

=== North Marple ===
North Marple
Party	Candidate	Votes	%	±%
Conservative	M. Taylor*	2,028	49.6	
Liberal	G. Gribble	1,362	33.3	
Labour	M. Stevens	696	17.0	
Majority		666	16.3	
Turnout		4,086	47.7	
Conservative hold		Swing		

=== North Reddish ===
North Reddish
Party	Candidate	Votes	%	±%
Labour	A. Flood	3,686	69.8	
Conservative	K. Chapman	1,239	23.5	
Liberal	A. Hayward	297	5.6	
Communist	N. Bourne	60	1.1	
Majority		2,447	46.3	
Turnout		5,282	45.6	
Labour hold		Swing		

=== Romiley ===
Romiley
Party	Candidate	Votes	%	±%
Conservative	H. Whitehead*	2,292	45.8	
Labour	R. Boyd	1,406	28.1	
Liberal	J. Facer-Smith	1,306	26.1	
Majority		886	17.7	
Turnout		5,004	44.2	
Conservative hold		Swing		

=== South Marple ===
South Marple
Party	Candidate	Votes	%	±%
Conservative	C. Mason*	2,499	56.1	
Liberal	D. Brailsford	1,338	30.0	
Labour	T. Jackson	619	13.9	
Majority		1,161	26.1	
Turnout		4,456	47.0	
Conservative hold		Swing		

=== South Reddish ===
South Reddish
Party	Candidate	Votes	%	±%
Labour	A. Bradbury	2,716	56.1	
Labour	P. Bray	2,714	56.1	
Labour	A. Mobbs	2,535	52.4	
Conservative	J. Harris	1,174	24.3	
Conservative	M. Litchfield	1,144	23.6	
Conservative	B. Francis	1,056	21.8	
Liberal	D. Bruce	1,005	20.8	
Liberal	A. Hyde	924	19.1	
Liberal	G. Fenton	922	19.0	
Independent Liberal	J. D. Hunt	343	7.1	
Majority		1,361	28.1	
Turnout		4,840	44.5	
Labour win (new seat)				
Labour win (new seat)				
Labour win (new seat)				

=== West Bramhall ===
West Bramhall
Party	Candidate	Votes	%	±%
Conservative	A. McGregor*	3,425	66.9	
Liberal	W. Littlehales	1,312	25.6	
Labour	L. Lawrence	383	7.5	
Majority		2,212	41.3	
Turnout		5,021	44.3	
Conservative hold		Swing		
