= 1983 Stockport Metropolitan Borough Council election =

Local election in Stockport

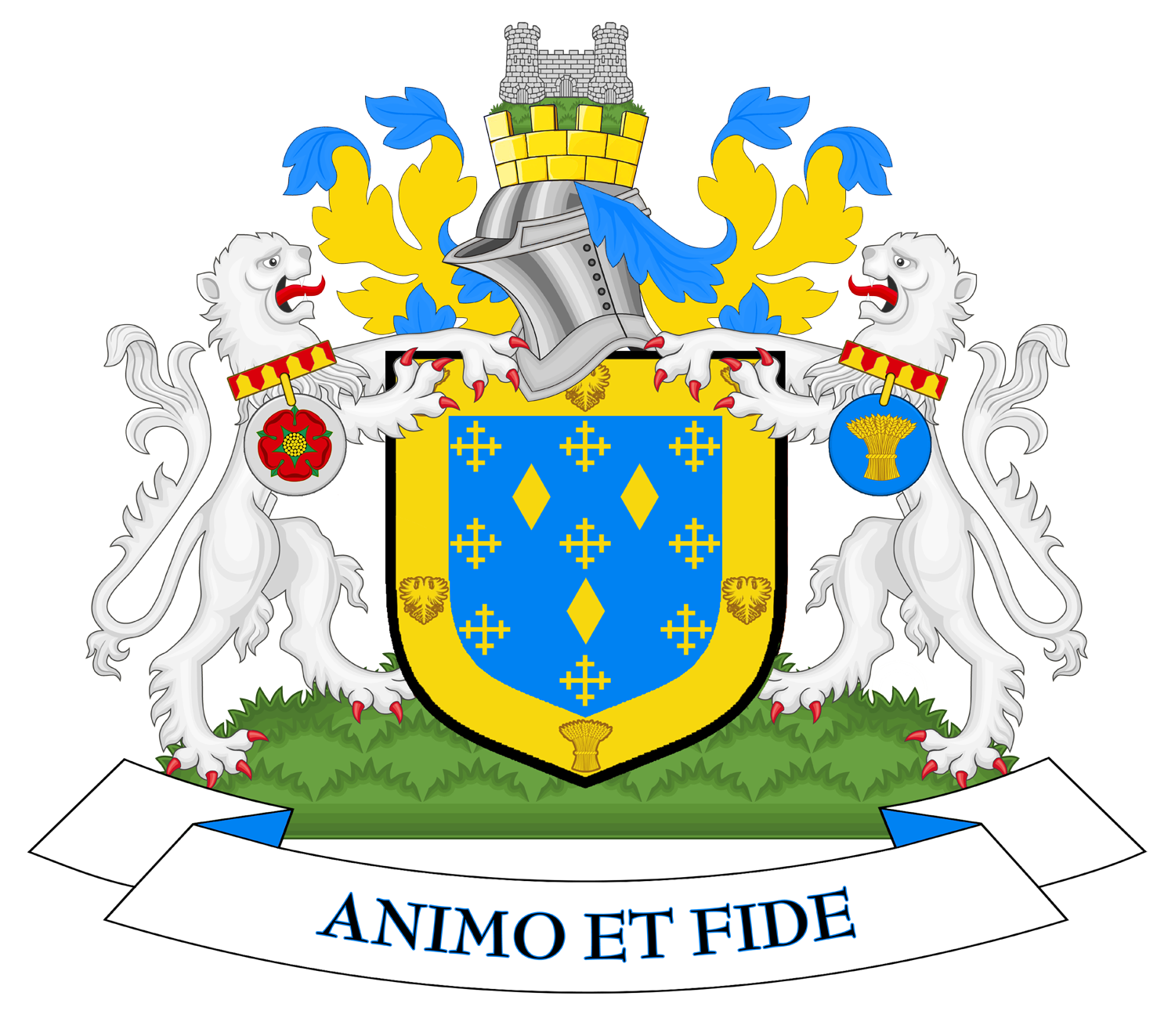
← 1982	5 May 1983	1984 →

22 of 63 seats to Stockport Metropolitan Borough Council 32 seats needed for a majority
	First party	Second party	Third party
Leader	John Lloyd	Harold Peters	Brian Leah
Party	Conservative	Labour	Alliance
Leader's seat	Heaton Moor	Edgeley (defeated)	Cheadle Hulme South
Last election	11 seats, 40.6%	5 seats, 20.8%	4 seats, 34.8%
Seats before	32	20	8
Seats won	8	6	7
Seats after	30	18	12
Seat change	▼2	▼2	▲4
Popular vote	46,635	29,063	38,551
Percentage	39.3%	24.5%	32.5%
Swing	▼1.3%	▲3.7%	▼2.3%
	Fourth party
Leader	Ron Stenson
Party	Heald Green Ratepayers
Leader's seat	Heald Green
Last election	1 seat, 3.0%
Seats before	3
Seats won	1
Seats after	3
Seat change	Steady
Popular vote	3,265
Percentage	2.8%
Swing	▼0.2%
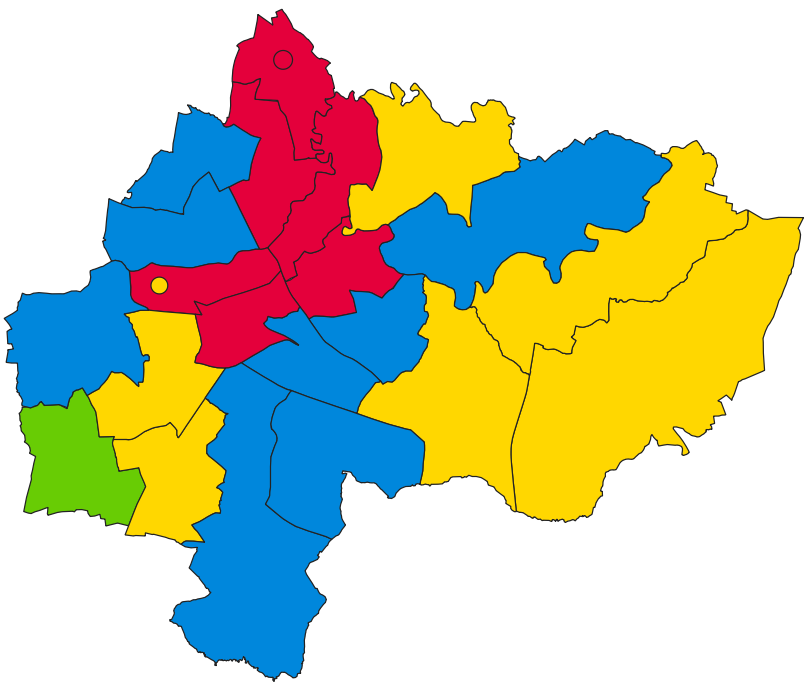
- Map of results of 1983 election
Leader of the Council before election
John Lloyd
Conservative
Leader of the Council after election
John Lloyd
Conservative

Elections to Stockport Council were held on Thursday, 5 May 1983. One third of the council was up for election, with each successful candidate to serve a four-year term of office, expiring in 1987. The Conservative Party lost overall control of the council, to no overall control.

== Election result ==
Party	Votes		Seats			Full Council	
Conservative Party	46,635 (39.3%)	▼1.3	8 (36.4%)	8 / 22	▼2	30 (47.6%)	30 / 63
Labour Party	29,063 (24.5%)	▲3.7	6 (27.3%)	6 / 22	▼2	18 (28.6%)	18 / 63
Alliance	38,551 (32.5%)	▼2.3	7 (31.8%)	7 / 22	▲4	12 (19.0%)	12 / 63
Heald Green Ratepayers	3,265 (2.8%)	▼0.2	1 (4.5%)	1 / 22	Steady	3 (4.8%)	3 / 63
Ecology	880 (0.7%)	▲0.2	0 (0.0%)	0 / 22	Steady	0 (0.0%)	0 / 63
Independent	105 (0.1%)	N/A	0 (0.0%)	0 / 22	N/A	0 (0.0%)	0 / 63
Communist	39 (0.0%)	Steady	0 (0.0%)	0 / 22	Steady	0 (0.0%)	0 / 63
Independent Liberal	39 (0.0%)	▼0.2	0 (0.0%)	0 / 22	Steady	0 (0.0%)	0 / 63

↓
18	12	3	30

== Ward results ==
=== Bredbury ===
Bredbury
Party	Candidate	Votes	%	±%
Liberal	A. M. Vos	3,101	49.4	−3.2
Conservative	A. M. Treharne	1,794	28.6	+2.0
Labour	R. A. Peachey	1,336	21.3	+0.5
Ecology	J. E. Vaughan	48	0.8	N/A
Majority		1,307	20.8	−5.2
Turnout		6,279	57.9	+9.9
Liberal gain from Conservative		Swing		

=== Brinnington ===
Brinnington
Party	Candidate	Votes	%	±%
Labour	C. D. MacAlister*	2,939	74.6	+9.2
Conservative	J. Davidson	585	14.8	+0.7
SDP	M. C. Torevell	418	10.6	−9.9
Majority		2,354	59.8	+14.9
Turnout		3,942	44.7	+7.4
Labour hold		Swing		

=== Cale Green ===
Cale Green
Party	Candidate	Votes	%	±%
Labour	P. J. Towey	1,998	50.0	+5.8
Conservative	E. E. Meredith	1,174	29.4	+1.2
SDP	E. Harding	718	18.0	−8.3
Ecology	M. F. Ledger	106	2.6	+1.2
Majority		824	20.6	+4.6
Turnout		3,996	42.5	+1.9
Labour hold		Swing		

=== Cheadle ===
Cheadle
Party	Candidate	Votes	%	±%
Conservative	L. Singer*	3,052	60.4	+2.2
Liberal	I. M. Kirk	1,652	32.7	−3.2
Labour	K. Parker	348	6.9	+1.0
Majority		1,400	27.7	+5.4
Turnout		5,052	51.2	+3.4
Conservative hold		Swing		

=== Cheadle Hulme North ===
Cheadle Hulme North
Party	Candidate	Votes	%	±%
Liberal	J. Pantall*	3,053	54.2	−2.3
Conservative	P. M. M. Thornber	1,970	35.0	+0.9
Labour	A. H. Olsen	560	9.9	+0.4
Ecology	G. Leatherbarrow	49	0.9	N/A
Majority		1,083	19.2	−3.2
Turnout		5,632	50.0	+3.8
Liberal hold		Swing		

=== Cheadle Hulme South ===
Cheadle Hulme South
Party	Candidate	Votes	%	±%
Liberal	D. M. Bruce*	3,109	47.3	−6.2
Conservative	L. Hall	3,099	47.2	+6.1
Labour	L. E. Lawrence	361	5.5	0
Majority		10	0.1	−12.3
Turnout		6,569	59.0	+3.2
Liberal hold		Swing		

=== Davenport ===
Davenport
Party	Candidate	Votes	%	±%
Conservative	B. Haley*	2,202	48.4	+2.0
Labour	M. I. Banks	1,304	28.6	+4.0
SDP	S. M. Comer	954	21.0	−6.0
Ecology	R. E. Bamforth	92	2.0	0
Majority		898	19.8	+0.4
Turnout		4,552	48.6	+1.8
Conservative hold		Swing		

=== East Bramhall ===
East Bramhall
Party	Candidate	Votes	%	±%
Conservative	K. Holt	3,491	49.6	−7.8
Liberal	J. C. Hart	3,277	46.6	+8.5
Labour	J. McMullen	267	3.8	−0.7
Majority		214	3.0	−16.3
Turnout		7,035	56.3	+5.4
Conservative gain from Liberal		Swing		

=== Edgeley ===
Edgeley (2 vacancies)
Party	Candidate	Votes	%	±%
Labour	A. Endsor*	2,332	45.3	+10.1
Liberal	F. Davenport	2,125	41.3	−6.8
Labour	H. Peters*	1,967	38.2	+3.0
SDP	P. C. W. Beatty	1,765	34.3	−13.8
Conservative	M. B. Brooks	969	18.8	+3.3
Conservative	B. J. Rendell	925	18.0	+2.5
Independent	W. Statham	105	2.0	N/A
Ecology	I. A. Boyd	83	1.6	N/A
Independent Liberal	J. D. Hunt	39	0.8	N/A
Majority		158	3.1	−9.8
Turnout		5,145	49.9	+9.6
Labour hold		Swing		
Liberal gain from Labour		Swing		

=== Great Moor ===
Great Moor
Party	Candidate	Votes	%	±%
Conservative	K. Ashworth	2,365	42.3	+0.8
Labour	P. J. Wharton	1,877	33.6	+7.1
SDP	T. E. Pyle	1,294	23.1	−7.7
Ecology	V. Hindle	54	1.0	−0.2
Majority		488	8.7	−2.0
Turnout		5,590	50.8	+7.6
Conservative gain from Labour		Swing		

=== Hazel Grove ===
Hazel Grove
Party	Candidate	Votes	%	±%
Liberal	D. G. Robinson	3,545	52.6	+6.8
Conservative	D. W. West*	2,690	39.9	−6.8
Labour	T. P. McGee	499	7.5	0
Majority		855	12.7	
Turnout		6,734	55.5	+6.4
Liberal gain from Conservative		Swing		

=== Heald Green ===
Heald Green
Party	Candidate	Votes	%	±%
Heald Green Ratepayers	N. Fields*	3,265	66.6	+4.4
Conservative	K. A. Edis	910	18.5	+0.1
Labour	M. G. Lawley	414	8.4	+1.3
Liberal	A. Welch	317	6.5	−5.4
Majority		2,355	48.0	+4.2
Turnout		4,906	46.1	−1.4
Heald Green Ratepayers hold		Swing		

=== Heaton Mersey ===
Heaton Mersey
Party	Candidate	Votes	%	±%
Conservative	V. Burgon*	3,099	53.1	+0.9
Labour	M. A. Coffey	1,794	30.7	+7.2
SDP	M. Robinson	849	14.5	−8.3
Ecology	E. V. Hawthorn	56	1.0	−0.5
Communist	D. Powell	39	0.7	N/A
Majority		1,305	22.4	−6.3
Turnout		5,837	52.1	+3.6
Conservative hold		Swing		

=== Heaton Moor ===
Heaton Moor
Party	Candidate	Votes	%	±%
Conservative	W. M. Crook*	2,729	58.6	+1.0
Labour	F. Town	918	19.7	+5.0
Liberal	J. Langrish	899	19.3	−8.3
Ecology	F. K. Chapman	111	2.4	N/A
Majority		1,811	38.9	+8.9
Turnout		4,657	47.7	+3.4
Conservative hold		Swing		

=== Manor ===
Manor
Party	Candidate	Votes	%	±%
Labour	W. McCann	1,908	42.5	+3.6
Conservative	J. Hendry	1,608	35.8	+5.1
SDP	S. C. Rimmer	894	19.9	−9.5
Ecology	G. Johnson	76	1.7	+0.4
Majority		300	6.7	−1.8
Turnout		4,486	48.1	+5.8
Labour hold		Swing		

=== North Marple ===
North Marple
Party	Candidate	Votes	%	±%
Liberal	B. J. Warwick	2,505	49.3	+8.3
Conservative	D. J. Headridge*	2,130	41.9	−6.0
Labour	A. J. Howard	448	8.8	−2.4
Majority		375	7.4	
Turnout		5,083	57.1	+2.6
Liberal gain from Conservative		Swing		

=== North Reddish ===
North Reddish
Party	Candidate	Votes	%	±%
Labour	B. Bradbury*	2,951	53.5	+1.1
Conservative	L. A. Corcoran	1,547	28.0	+3.3
SDP	D. J. Whittle	1,020	18.5	−3.6
Majority		1,404	25.5	−2.2
Turnout		5,518	47.8	+2.8
Labour hold		Swing		

=== Romiley ===
Romiley
Party	Candidate	Votes	%	±%
Conservative	J. G. Howe*	2,364	40.0	−7.4
Liberal	J. Facer-Smith	2,228	37.7	+8.8
Labour	J. A. Hughes	1,317	22.3	−1.4
Majority		136	2.3	−16.2
Turnout		5,909	51.1	+5.0
Conservative hold		Swing		

=== South Marple ===
South Marple
Party	Candidate	Votes	%	±%
Liberal	E. Kime	2,685	47.9	+7.4
Conservative	A. W. Finnie*	2,501	44.6	−7.0
Labour	H. J. Abrams	349	6.2	−0.1
Ecology	M. L. Nicholls	74	1.3	−0.3
Majority		184	3.3	
Turnout		5,609	56.0	+3.3
Liberal gain from Conservative		Swing		

=== South Reddish ===
South Reddish
Party	Candidate	Votes	%	±%
Labour	J. Mobbs	2,780	56.4	+7.5
Conservative	B. Francis	1,407	28.6	+0.5
SDP	W. Gaskell	691	14.0	−6.8
Ecology	S. A. Ledger	47	1.0	+0.1
Majority		1,373	27.8	+11.0
Turnout		4,925	44.6	+6.3
Labour hold		Swing		

=== West Bramhall ===
West Bramhall
Party	Candidate	Votes	%	±%
Conservative	J. M. Green	4,024	67.6	+4.8
SDP	P. C. O. Vittoz	1,452	24.4	−5.6
Labour	D. Harris	396	6.6	+2.7
Ecology	N. G. Bamber	84	1.4	+0.1
Majority		2,572	43.2	+12.4
Turnout		5,956	50.0	−1.0
Conservative hold		Swing		
