= 1982 Stockport Metropolitan Borough Council election =

Local election in Stockport

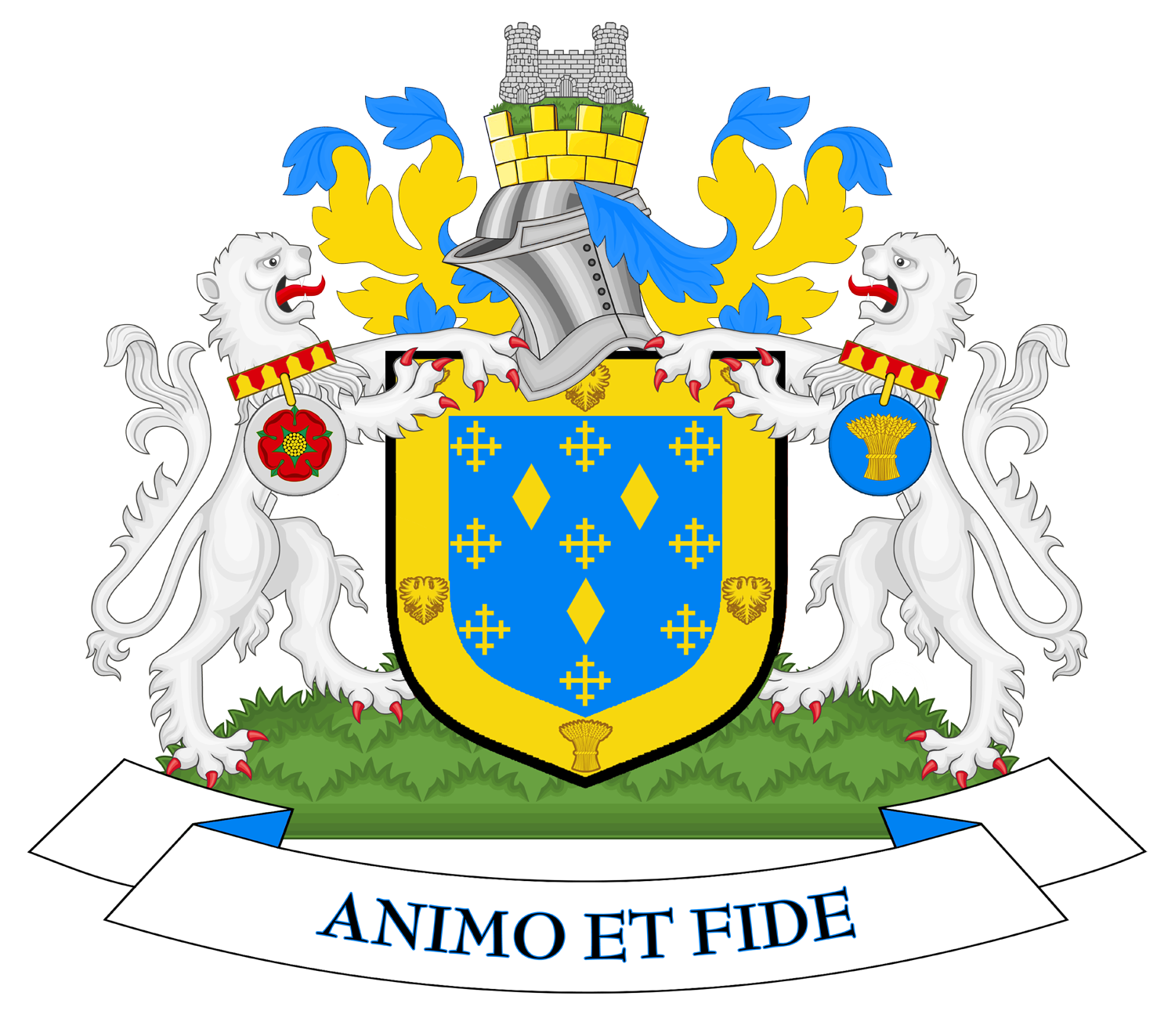
← 1980	6 May 1982	1983 →

21 of 63 seats to Stockport Metropolitan Borough Council 32 seats needed for a majority
	First party	Second party	Third party
Leader	John Lloyd	Bernard Bradbury	Brian Leah
Party	Conservative	Labour	Alliance
Leader's seat	Heaton Moor	Reddish North	Cheadle Hulme South
Last election	11 seats, 39.9%	10 seats, 33.9%	1 seats, 22.7%
Seats before	32	22	6
Seats won	11	5	4
Seats after	32	20	8
Seat change	Steady	▼2	▲2
Popular vote	42,274	21,660	36,200
Percentage	40.6%	20.8%	34.8%
Swing	▲0.7%	▼13.1%	▲12.1%
	Fourth party
Leader	Ron Stenson
Party	Heald Green Ratepayers
Leader's seat	Heald Green
Last election	1 seat, 2.6%
Seats before	3
Seats won	1
Seats after	3
Seat change	Steady
Popular vote	3,133
Percentage	3.0%
Swing	▲0.4%
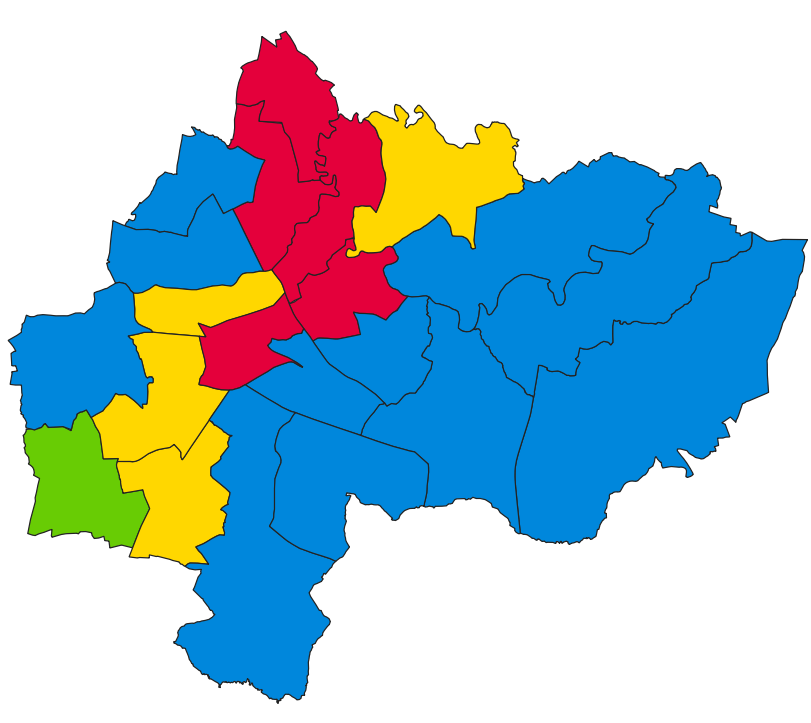
- Map of results of 1982 election
Leader of the Council before election
John Lloyd
Conservative
Leader of the Council after election
John Lloyd
Conservative

Elections to Stockport Council were held on Thursday, 6 May 1982. One third of the council was up for election, with each successful candidate to serve a four-year term of office, expiring in 1986. The Conservative Party retained overall control of the council.

== Election result ==
Party	Votes		Seats			Full Council	
Conservative Party	42,274 (40.6%)	▲0.7	11 (52.4%)	11 / 21	Steady	32 (50.8%)	32 / 63
Labour Party	21,660 (20.8%)	▼13.1	5 (23.8%)	5 / 21	▼2	20 (31.7%)	20 / 63
Alliance	36,200 (34.8%)	▲12.1	4 (19.0%)	4 / 21	▲2	8 (12.7%)	8 / 63
Heald Green Ratepayers	3,133 (3.0%)	▲0.4	1 (4.8%)	1 / 21	Steady	3 (4.8%)	3 / 63
Ecology	555 (0.5%)	N/A	0 (0.0%)	0 / 21	N/A	0 (0.0%)	0 / 63
Independent Liberal	219 (0.2%)	▼0.1	0 (0.0%)	0 / 21	Steady	0 (0.0%)	0 / 63
Workers Revolutionary	59 (0.1%)	N/A	0 (0.0%)	0 / 21	N/A	0 (0.0%)	0 / 63
Communist	44 (0.0%)	▼0.1	0 (0.0%)	0 / 21	Steady	0 (0.0%)	0 / 63

↓
20	8	3	32

== Ward results ==
=== Bredbury ===
Bredbury
Party	Candidate	Votes	%	±%
Liberal	D. Humphries	2,733	52.6	+21.6
Conservative	A. Treharne	1,385	26.6	−7.5
Labour	R. Peachey	1,080	20.8	−14.1
Majority		1,348	26.0	
Turnout		5,198	48.0	−2.4
Liberal gain from Conservative		Swing		

=== Brinnington ===
Brinnington
Party	Candidate	Votes	%	±%
Labour	K. Ford*	2,189	65.4	−17.4
SDP	M. Torevell	688	20.5	+14.8
Conservative	F. Field	472	14.1	+2.6
Majority		1,501	44.9	−26.4
Turnout		3,349	37.3	−2.7
Labour hold		Swing		

=== Cale Green ===
Cale Green
Party	Candidate	Votes	%	±%
Labour	R. Boyd	1,695	44.2	−14.3
Conservative	J. Hendry	1,082	28.2	−1.6
SDP	H. Gaskell	1,008	26.3	+16.9
Ecology	J. Wrightman	54	1.4	N/A
Majority		613	16.0	−12.7
Turnout		3,839	40.6	+0.8
Labour hold		Swing		

=== Cheadle ===
Cheadle
Party	Candidate	Votes	%	±%
Conservative	J. Needham	2,730	58.2	−9.3
Liberal	I. Kirk	1,686	35.9	+14.1
Labour	A. Kellett	276	5.9	−4.7
Majority		1,044	22.3	−23.4
Turnout		4,692	47.8	+4.3
Conservative hold		Swing		

=== Cheadle Hulme North ===
Cheadle Hulme North
Party	Candidate	Votes	%	±%
Liberal	K. Anstis*	2,910	56.5	+9.0
Conservative	J. Walsh	1,754	34.1	−5.7
Labour	N. Stoddard	487	9.5	−3.2
Majority		1,156	22.4	+14.7
Turnout		5,151	46.2	−2.8
Liberal hold		Swing		

=== Cheadle Hulme South ===
Cheadle Hulme South
Party	Candidate	Votes	%	±%
Liberal	B. Leah*	3,289	53.5	+11.2
Conservative	T. Radcliffe	2,525	41.1	−9.2
Labour	R. Brown	336	5.5	−1.9
Majority		764	12.4	
Turnout		6,150	55.8	+2.8
Liberal hold		Swing		

=== Davenport ===
Davenport
Party	Candidate	Votes	%	±%
Conservative	G. Lowe*	2,042	46.4	−1.2
SDP	V. Dawson	1,187	27.0	+15.2
Labour	E. Hoad	1,085	24.6	−16.0
Ecology	R. Bamforth	89	2.0	N/A
Majority		855	19.4	+12.4
Turnout		4,403	46.8	+4.2
Conservative hold		Swing		

=== East Bramhall ===
East Bramhall
Party	Candidate	Votes	%	±%
Conservative	A. Doherty*	3,549	57.4	+1.0
Liberal	F. Ridley	2,357	38.1	+7.1
Labour	G. Scott	276	4.5	−1.5
Majority		1,192	19.3	−6.1
Turnout		6,182	50.9	+3.5
Conservative hold		Swing		

=== Edgeley ===
Edgeley
Party	Candidate	Votes	%	±%
Liberal	J. Ashworth	2,419	48.1	+16.5
Labour	J. McMullen	1,772	35.2	−14.4
Conservative	W. Thomson	780	15.5	−1.1
Workers Revolutionary	J. Downs	59	1.2	N/A
Majority		647	12.9	−5.1
Turnout		5,030	40.3	+2.0
Liberal gain from Labour		Swing		

=== Great Moor ===
Great Moor
Party	Candidate	Votes	%	±%
Conservative	I. Roberts	1,986	41.5	−2.0
SDP	J. Begg	1,472	30.8	+19.4
Labour	J. Mobbs	1,268	26.5	−18.7
Ecology	G. Leatherbarrow	58	1.2	N/A
Majority		514	10.7	
Turnout		4,784	43.2	−1.6
Conservative gain from Labour		Swing		

=== Hazel Grove ===
Hazel Grove
Party	Candidate	Votes	%	±%
Conservative	A. Law*	2,759	46.7	+1.9
Liberal	D. Robinson	2,706	45.8	+10.1
Labour	B. Hughes	440	7.5	−11.9
Majority		53	0.9	−8.2
Turnout		5,905	49.1	+4.4
Conservative hold		Swing		

=== Heald Green ===
Heald Green
Party	Candidate	Votes	%	±%
Heald Green Ratepayers	P. Burns	3,133	62.2	−0.8
Conservative	L. Clark	926	18.4	−1.0
SDP	S. Comer	598	11.9	+3.1
Labour	M. Lawley	359	7.1	−1.8
Ecology	S. Lasker	20	0.4	N/A
Majority		2,207	43.8	+0.2
Turnout		5,036	47.5	+4.0
Heald Green Ratepayers hold		Swing		

=== Heaton Mersey ===
Heaton Mersey
Party	Candidate	Votes	%	±%
Conservative	P. Whitney*	2,834	52.2	+1.9
Labour	M. Banks	1,277	23.5	−15.3
SDP	P. Vittoz	1,237	22.8	+11.9
Ecology	F. Chapman	84	1.5	N/A
Majority		1,557	28.7	+17.2
Turnout		5,432	48.5	+3.6
Conservative hold		Swing		

=== Heaton Moor ===
Heaton Moor
Party	Candidate	Votes	%	±%
Conservative	J. A. MacCarron*	2,526	57.6	−1.1
Liberal	J. Langrish	1,211	27.6	+14.7
Labour	D. Solomon	646	14.7	−13.7
Majority		1,315	30.0	−0.3
Turnout		4,383	44.3	+2.4
Conservative hold		Swing		

=== Manor ===
Manor
Party	Candidate	Votes	%	±%
Labour	E. Gallacher*	1,495	38.9	−19.8
Conservative	H. Armstrong	1,168	30.7	−0.3
SDP	S. Rimmer	1,131	29.4	+18.8
Ecology	E. Ashton	50	1.3	N/A
Majority		327	8.5	−19.5
Turnout		3,844	42.3	−1.1
Labour hold		Swing		

=== North Marple ===
North Marple
Party	Candidate	Votes	%	±%
Conservative	J. Childerstone	2,304	47.9	−1.7
Liberal	B. Warwick	1,972	41.0	+7.7
Labour	A. Howard	539	11.2	−5.8
Majority		332	6.9	−9.4
Turnout		4,815	54.5	+6.8
Conservative hold		Swing		

=== North Reddish ===
North Reddish
Party	Candidate	Votes	%	±%
Labour	P. Halliday*	2,717	52.4	−17.4
Conservative	P. Gamblin	1,279	24.7	+1.2
SDP	T. Pyle	1,145	22.1	+16.5
Communist	N. Bourne	44	0.8	−0.3
Majority		1,438	27.7	−18.6
Turnout		5,185	45.0	−0.6
Labour hold		Swing		

=== Romiley ===
Romiley
Party	Candidate	Votes	%	±%
Conservative	P. Gilleney*	2,531	47.4	+1.6
SDP	B. Ravenscroft	1,546	28.9	+2.8
Labour	J. Hughes	1,266	23.7	−4.4
Majority		985	18.5	+0.8
Turnout		5,343	46.1	+1.9
Conservative hold		Swing		

=== South Marple ===
South Marple
Party	Candidate	Votes	%	±%
Conservative	J. Cooke*	2,670	51.6	−4.5
Liberal	D. Brailsford	2,097	40.5	+10.5
Labour	W. Town	325	6.3	−7.6
Ecology	M. Nicholls	83	1.6	N/A
Majority		573	11.1	−15.0
Turnout		5,175	52.7	+5.7
Conservative hold		Swing		

=== South Reddish ===
South Reddish
Party	Candidate	Votes	%	±%
Labour	A. Mobbs*	1,897	44.9	−11.2
Conservative	B. Francis	1,188	28.1	+3.8
Liberal	I. Files	880	20.8	0
Independent Liberal	J. D. Hunt	219	5.2	−1.9
Ecology	S. Ledger	40	0.9	N/A
Majority		709	16.8	−11.3
Turnout		4,224	38.3	−6.2
Labour hold		Swing		

=== West Bramhall ===
West Bramhall
Party	Candidate	Votes	%	±%
Conservative	J. B. Leck*	3,784	62.8	−4.1
SDP	T. Davies	1,928	32.0	+6.4
Labour	I. Hamilton	235	3.9	−3.6
Ecology	N. Bamber	77	1.3	N/A
Majority		1,856	30.8	−10.5
Turnout		6,024	51.0	+6.7
Conservative hold		Swing		
