= Reddish South (ward, 2004–2022) =

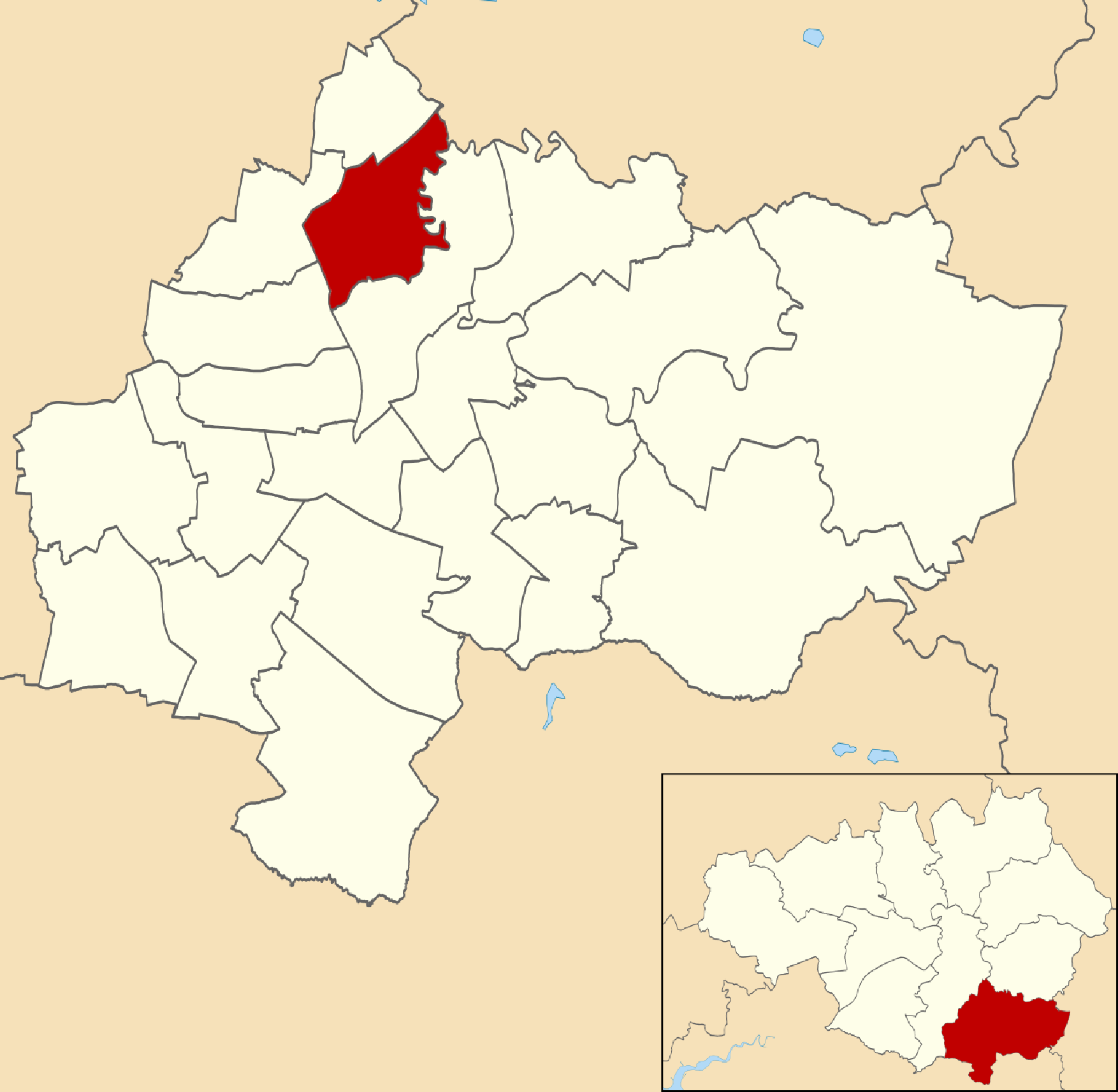
- Reddish South within Stockport
- Population: 10,336 (2010)
- Country: England
- Sovereign state: United Kingdom
- UK Parliament: Denton and Reddish
- Councillors: Janet Mobbs (Labour); Gary Lawson (Green); Liz Crix (Green)

Reddish South was an electoral ward in the Metropolitan Borough of Stockport. It elected three councillors to Stockport Metropolitan Borough Council using the first past the post electoral method, electing one councillor every year without election on the fourth.

It covered the southern part of Reddish, including parts of Heaton Norris and Heaton Chapel. Together with Reddish North it formed part of the Denton and Reddish Parliamentary Constituency.

== Councillors ==
Reddish South electoral ward is represented in Westminster by Andrew Gwynne MP for Denton and Reddish.

The ward was represented on Stockport Council by three councillors: Liz Crix (Green), Janet Mobbs (Lab), and Gary Lawson (Green).

Election	Councillor	Councillor	Councillor
2004	Tom Grundy (Lab)	Walter Brett (Lab)	Joan Kidd (Lab)
2006	Tom Grundy (Lab)	Walter Brett (Lab)	Joan Kidd (Lab)
2007	Tom Grundy (Lab)	Walter Brett (Lab)	Joan Kidd (Lab)
2008	Tom Grundy (Lab)	Walter Brett (Lab)	Andrew Verdeille (Lab)
2010	Tom Grundy (Lab)	Walter Brett (Lab)	Andrew Verdeille (Lab)
2011	Tom Grundy (Lab)	Walter Brett (Lab)	Andrew Verdeille (Lab)
2012	Tom Grundy (Lab)	Walter Brett (Lab)	Andrew Verdeille (Lab)
2014	Tom Grundy (Lab)	Walter Brett (Lab)	Andrew Verdeille (Lab)
2015	Tom Grundy (Lab)	Walter Brett (Lab)	Andrew Verdeille (Lab)
2016	Tom Grundy (Lab)	Walter Brett (Lab)	Yvonne Guariento (Lab)
2018	Jude Wells (Lab)	Walter Brett (Lab)	Yvonne Guariento (Lab)
2019	Jude Wells (Lab)	Janet Mobbs (Lab)	Yvonne Guariento (Lab)
2021	Jude Wells (Lab)	Janet Mobbs (Lab)	Gary Lawson (Grn)
2022	Liz Crix (Grn)	Janet Mobbs (Lab)	Gary Lawson (Grn)

indicates seat up for re-election.

== Elections in the 2010s ==
=== May 2022 ===
2022
Party	Candidate	Votes	%	±%
Green	Liz Crix	1,916	50	
Labour	Holly McCormack	1,538	40	
Conservative	Hassan Sajjad	287	8	
Liberal Democrats	Mark Anthony Jones	60	2	
Majority		378		
Turnout		3,801		
Green gain from Labour		Swing		

=== May 2021 ===
2021
Party	Candidate	Votes	%	±%
Green	Gary Lawson	2,010	48	
Labour	Yvonne Guariento	1,453	35	
Conservative	Rita Jones	450	11	
Independent	Daniel Zieba	210	5	
Liberal Democrats	Alex Orndal	60	1	
Majority		557		
Turnout		4,183	40	
Green gain from Labour		Swing		

=== May 2019 ===
2019
Party	Candidate	Votes	%	±%
Labour	Janet Mobbs	1,379	47	−17%
Green	Gary Lawson	558	19	+13%
Conservative	Sue Carroll	363	12	−7%
UKIP	Joshua Seddon	341	12	+7%
Liberal Democrats	Alex Orndal	267	9	+3%
Majority		821		
Turnout		2,908	28	
Labour hold		Swing		

=== May 2018 ===
2018
Party	Candidate	Votes	%	±%
Labour	Jude Wells	1,916	64	
Conservative	David Dowse	578	19	
Green	Gary Lawson	176	6	
Liberal Democrats	Gemma-Jane Bowker	169	6	
UKIP	Joshua Seddon	147	5	
Majority		1,338		
Turnout		2,986	29	
Labour hold		Swing		

=== May 2016 ===
2016
Party	Candidate	Votes	%	±%
Labour	Yvonne Guariento	1,836	58	
UKIP	Ann Moore	445	14	
Conservative	Alexander Fenton	442	14	
Green	Gary Lawson	223	7	
Liberal Democrats	Brian Hendley	189	6	
Majority		1,391		
Turnout		3,177	31	
Labour hold		Swing		

=== May 2015 ===
2015
Party	Candidate	Votes	%	±%
Labour	Walter Brett	3,499	54	
Conservative	Ciaran Kilheeney	1,308	20	
UKIP	Julie Warburton	887	14	
Green	Jess Northey	451	7	
Liberal Democrats	John Reid	331	5	
Majority		2,191		
Turnout		6,476	62	
Labour hold		Swing		

=== May 2014 ===
2014
Party	Candidate	Votes	%	±%
Labour	Tom Grundy	1,948	60%	−10.22%
Conservative	Alex Fenton	561	17%	+3.50%
Green	Jess Northey	322	10%	N/A
BNP	Ged Williams	271	8%	+1.35%
Liberal Democrats	Louise Shaw	169	5%	−4.63%
Majority		1,387	43%	−13.72
Turnout		3,271		
Labour hold		Swing		

=== May 2012 ===
2012
Party	Candidate	Votes	%	±%
Labour	Andy Verdeille	2,028	70.22	+20.74
Conservative	Anthony Hannay	390	13.50	−19.33
Liberal Democrats	Norman Beverley	278	9.63	−8.06
BNP	Ged Williams	192	6.65	N/A
Majority		1,638	56.72	
Turnout		2,905	27.83	
Labour hold		Swing		

=== May 2011 ===
2011
Party	Candidate	Votes	%	±%
Labour	Walter Brett	2,347	65.0	
Conservative	Stephen Burt	640	17.7	
Liberal Democrats	Norman Beverley	421	11.7	
BNP	Shelia Spink	177	4.9	
Majority		1,707		
Turnout		3,608	34.40	
Labour hold		Swing		
